= 2020 UK Open =

2020 Ladbrokes UK Open

Tournament information
- Dates: 6–8 March 2020
- Venue: Butlin's Minehead
- Location: Minehead, England
- Organisation(s): Professional Darts Corporation (PDC)
- Format: Legs; Final – best of 21
- Prize fund: £450,000
- Winner's share: £100,000
- Nine-dart finish: Jonny Clayton; Michael van Gerwen
- High checkout: 170; Dimitri Van den Bergh; Michael van Gerwen

Champion(s)
- (Netherlands) Michael van Gerwen

The 2020 Ladbrokes UK Open was a darts tournament staged by the Professional Darts Corporation. It was the eighteenth year of the tournament where players compete in a single elimination tournament to be crowned champion. The tournament was held for the seventh time at the Butlin's Resort in Minehead, England, from 6 to 8 March 2020, and has the nickname, "the FA Cup of darts" as a random draw is staged after each round following the conclusion of the third round until the final.

Nathan Aspinall was the defending champion after defeating Rob Cross 11–5 in the 2019 final. However, he lost 10–8 to Michael van Gerwen in the fourth round.

Michael van Gerwen won the UK Open for the third time, and the first time since 2016 after beating Gerwyn Price 11–9 in the final. It was Van Gerwen's first title since he won the 2019 Players Championship Finals, where he beat the same opponent, by the same scoreline, at the same venue.

It was the first edition of the UK Open to have more than one nine-darter hit. Jonny Clayton hit a nine-darter on Stage Two during his sixth-round match with Chris Dobey, before Michael van Gerwen did the same against Daryl Gurney in the semi-finals.

== Prize money ==
The prize fund remained at £450,000.

Stage (no. of players)		Prize money (Total: £450,000)
Winner	(1)	£100,000
Runner-up	(1)	£40,000
Semi-finalists	(2)	£20,000
Quarter-finalists	(4)	£12,500
Last 16 (sixth round)	(8)	£7,500
Last 32 (fifth round)	(16)	£4,000
Last 64 (fourth round)	(32)	£2,000
Last 96 (third round)	(32)	£1,000
Last 128 (second round)	(32)	n/a
Last 160 (first round)	(32)	n/a

== Format ==
There is a slight change in format for this year, with the 16 Challenge Tour qualifiers becoming 8, with 8 spaces for the Development Tour now available.

The 160 participants will enter the competition incrementally, with 64 players entering in the first round, with match winners joining the 32 players entering in the second and third rounds to leave the last 64 in the fourth round.

- No players are seeded.
- A random draw is held for each of the following rounds following the conclusion of the third round.
- All matches in the first, second and third rounds will be played over best of 11 legs.
- All matches in the fourth, fifth and sixth rounds and quarter-finals will be played over best of 19 legs.
- All matches in the semi-finals and final will be played over best of 21 legs.
- Eight boards will be used for matches in the first, second, third and fourth rounds.
- Four boards will be used for matches in the fifth round.
- Two boards will be used for matches in the sixth round.
- One board will be used for all the matches in the quarter-finals, semi-finals and final.

== Qualifiers ==
=== Number 1–32 of the PDC Order of Merit (receiving byes into fourth round) ===
1. (Netherlands) Michael van Gerwen
2. (Scotland) Peter Wright
3. (Wales) Gerwyn Price
4. (England) Rob Cross
5. (England) Michael Smith
6. (Scotland) Gary Anderson
7. (Northern Ireland) Daryl Gurney
8. (England) Nathan Aspinall
9. (England) James Wade
10. (England) Dave Chisnall
11. (England) Ian White
12. (Austria) Mensur Suljović
13. (England) Adrian Lewis
14. (Australia) Simon Whitlock
15. (England) Joe Cullen
16. (England) Stephen Bunting
17. (Wales) Jonny Clayton
18. (Poland) Krzysztof Ratajski
19. (England) Chris Dobey
20. (England) Glen Durrant
21. (Netherlands) Jeffrey de Zwaan
22. (England) Mervyn King
23. (Netherlands) Jermaine Wattimena
24. (Germany) ~~Max Hopp~~ (Note: Max Hopp withdrew from the tournament on the morning of the first day. It means one player will receive a bye to the fifth round.)
25. (England) Steve Beaton
26. (England) Darren Webster
27. (Netherlands) Danny Noppert
28. (England) Ricky Evans
29. (Belgium) Dimitri Van den Bergh
30. (England) Keegan Brown
31. (Scotland) John Henderson
32. (Northern Ireland) Brendan Dolan

=== Number 33–64 of the PDC Order of Merit (receiving byes into third round) ===
33. (England) Steve West
34. (Netherlands) Vincent van der Voort
35. (England) Luke Humphries
36. (Belgium) Kim Huybrechts
37. (Republic of Ireland) William O'Connor
38. (Germany) Gabriel Clemens
39. (England) James Wilson
40. (Republic of Ireland) Steve Lennon
41. (England) Ryan Searle
42. (Australia) Kyle Anderson
43. (England) Ryan Joyce
44. (England) Josh Payne
45. (England) Jamie Hughes
46. (Spain) Cristo Reyes
47. (England) Ross Smith
48. (Netherlands) Ron Meulenkamp
49. (Netherlands) Jelle Klaasen
50. (Lithuania) Darius Labanauskas
51. (Germany) Martin Schindler
52. (Netherlands) Benito van de Pas
53. (England) Richard North
54. (Northern Ireland) Mickey Mansell
55. (England) Justin Pipe
56. (Netherlands) Jan Dekker
57. (South Africa) Devon Petersen
58. (Wales) Jamie Lewis
59. (England) Luke Woodhouse
60. (Portugal) José de Sousa
61. (Scotland) Robert Thornton
62. (Spain) Toni Alcinas
63. (England) Matthew Edgar
64. (England) Simon Stevenson

=== Number 65–96 of the PDC Order of Merit (receiving byes into second round) ===
65. (England) Harry Ward
66. (England) Ted Evetts
67. (England) Mark McGeeney
68. (England) Andy Boulton
69. (Latvia) Madars Razma
70. (Austria) Rowby-John Rodriguez
71. (Netherlands) Geert Nentjes
72. (England) Scott Baker
73. (England) Joe Murnan
74. (Finland) Marko Kantele
75. (Northern Ireland) Gavin Carlin
76. (England) Conan Whitehead
77. (England) Kirk Shepherd
78. (Netherlands) Maik Kuivenhoven
79. (Germany) Christian Bunse
80. (England) Matt Clark
81. (England) Adrian Gray
82. (England) Reece Robinson
83. (England) David Pallett
84. (Netherlands) Niels Zonneveld
85. (Netherlands) Vincent van der Meer
86. (England) Carl Wilkinson
87. (Netherlands) Yordi Meeuwisse
88. (Greece) John Michael
89. (Canada) Jeff Smith
90. (Wales) Barrie Bates
91. (Wales) Jonathan Worsley
92. (England) Nathan Derry
93. (Netherlands) Mike van Duivenbode
94. (Netherlands) Dirk van Duijvenbode
95. (England) Jason Lowe
96. (Wales) Nick Kenny

=== Number 97–128 of the PDC Order of Merit (starting in first round) ===
97. (England) Scott Waites
98. (England) Alan Tabern
99. (Netherlands) Wesley Harms
100. (Czech Republic) Karel Sedláček
101. (England) Adam Hunt
102. (England) Wayne Jones
103. (England) Steve Brown
104. (Hong Kong) Kai Fan Leung
105. (Belgium) Mike De Decker
106. (England) Peter Jacques
107. (Sweden) Daniel Larsson
108. (England) Gary Blades
109. (Netherlands) Martijn Kleermaker
110. (Croatia) ~~Boris Krčmar~~ (Note: Boris Krčmar withdrew from the tournament prior to the draw. He was replaced by Ben Cheeseman, the highest ranked player on the 2019 Development Tour Order of Merit not yet qualified.)
111. (Austria) Harald Leitinger
112. (Spain) Jesús Noguera
113. (England) Andy Hamilton
114. (England) Lisa Ashton
115. (Scotland) Ryan Murray
116. (Australia) Damon Heta
117. (Australia) Darren Penhall
118. (Scotland) William Borland
119. (England) Ryan Meikle
120. (England) Michael Barnard
121. (Netherlands) Derk Telnekes
122. (Republic of Ireland) Ciaran Teehan
123. (England) Martin Atkins
124. (England) Aaron Beeney
125. (England) Bradley Brooks
126. (England) Callan Rydz
127. (Poland) Krzysztof Kciuk
128. (Germany) Steffen Siepmann

=== PDC Challenge Tour qualifiers (starting in first round) ===
The top 8 ranked players from the 2019 Challenge Tour Order of Merit who didn't have a Tour Card for the 2020 season qualified for the first round.

1. (Scotland) Cameron Menzies
2. (England) Stephen Burton
3. (Russia) Boris Koltsov
4. (England) Andy Jenkins
5. (New Zealand) Cody Harris
6. (Netherlands) Berry van Peer
7. (Northern Ireland) Kyle McKinstry
8. (England) Patrick Lynskey

=== PDC Development Tour qualifiers (starting in first round) ===
The top 8 ranked players from the 2019 Development Tour Order of Merit who didn't have a Tour Card for the 2020 season qualified for the first round.

1. (Republic of Ireland) Shane McGuirk
2. (Northern Ireland) Nathan Rafferty
3. (Republic of Ireland) Keane Barry
4. (Scotland) Greg Ritchie
5. (Scotland) Andrew Davidson
6. (Netherlands) Kevin Doets
7. (Netherlands) Owen Roelofs
8. (Netherlands) Danny van Trijp
9. (England) Ben Cheeseman

=== Rileys amateur qualifiers (starting in first round) ===
16 amateur players will qualify from 16 Rileys Sports Bar qualifiers held across the UK between 25 January and 22 February.

- (England) Jason Heaver – London Victoria
- (Scotland) Jamie Clark – Aberdeen
- (England) Adam Huckvale – Chester
- (England) Kelvin Self – Norwich
- (England) Fallon Sherrock – Wolverhampton
- (England) Scott Taylor – Chorlton
- (England) Adam Smith-Neale – Coventry
- (Northern Ireland) Kevin Burness – Nottingham
- (Wales) Lewy Williams – Sheffield
- (England) Rhys Hayden – South Benfleet
- (Wales) Robert Owen — Wolverhampton 2
- (Scotland) Darren Beveridge — Greenock
- (England) James Richardson — Harlow
- (Wales) Justin Smith — Liverpool
- (England) Alfie Thompson — Norwich 2
- (England) Jason Askew — London Victoria 2

== Draw ==
=== Friday 6 March ===
==== First round (best of eleven legs) ====
Player	Score	Player	Player	Score	Player
(Belgium) Mike De Decker 91.13	6 – 2	(England) Lisa Ashton 84.07	(Australia) Damon Heta 92.69	4 – 6	(England) Scott Waites 100.60
(Northern Ireland) Kyle McKinstry (CT) 92.57	6 – 1	(England) Fallon Sherrock (Q) 87.71	(New Zealand) Cody Harris (CT) 87.40	6 – 5	(England) Scott Taylor (Q) 89.89
(Hong Kong) Kai Fan Leung 100.77	6 – 3	(England) Kelvin Self (Q) 87.38	(England) Adam Hunt 87.55	0 – 6	(Czech Republic) Karel Sedláček 94.93
(Republic of Ireland) Keane Barry (DT) 81.89	2 – 6	(England) Alan Tabern 85.94	(England) Andy Hamilton 85.73	6 – 3	(England) Patrick Lynskey (CT) 81.46
(Germany) Steffen Siepmann 89.07	6 – 4	(Poland) Krzysztof Kciuk 94.01	(England) Peter Jacques 88.41	6 – 4	(Republic of Ireland) Ciaran Teehan 90.49
(England) Michael Barnard 86.26	5 – 6	(England) Steve Brown 90.58	(Sweden) Daniel Larsson 84.91	6 – 5	(England) Ryan Meikle 84.29
(England) Jason Askew (Q) 88.31	6 – 4	(Scotland) Greg Ritchie (DT) 80.87	(England) Jason Heaver (Q) 96.97	6 – 0	(Spain) Jesús Noguera 80.97
(England) Adam Smith-Neale (Q)	6 – 4	(England) Ben Cheeseman (DT)	(Scotland) Darren Beveridge (Q) 87.21	3 – 6	(Northern Ireland) Nathan Rafferty (DT) 92.89
(England) Adam Huckvale (Q) 68.58	1 – 6	(England) Stephen Burton (CT) 79.51	(England) Rhys Hayden (Q) 90.87	6 – 5	(Scotland) Jamie Clark (Q) 89.34
(Scotland) Cameron Menzies (CT) 95.96	5 – 6	(England) Bradley Brooks 95.63	(Northern Ireland) Kevin Burness (Q) 75.91	1 – 6	(Austria) Harald Leitinger 86.65
(England) Aaron Beeney 76.53	3 – 6	(Netherlands) Wesley Harms 86.04	(Russia) Boris Koltsov (CT) 85.99	4 – 6	(Netherlands) Danny van Trijp (DT) 85.98
(Scotland) Andrew Davidson (DT) 73.53	2 – 6	(Scotland) William Borland 86.05	(Wales) Lewis Williams (Q) 93.42	6– 5	(Wales) Robert Owen (Q) 94.03
(England) Martin Atkins 91.05	6 – 5	(Scotland) Ryan Murray 93.90	(Republic of Ireland) Shane McGuirk (DT) 85.70	5 – 6	(England) Callan Rydz 88.16
(England) Wayne Jones 92.15	6 – 1	(England) Gary Blades 79.54	(Netherlands) Berry van Peer (CT) 77.13	6 – 3	(Netherlands) Owen Roelofs (DT) 77.06
(Wales) Justin Smith (Q) 88.10	6 – 3	(England) Andy Jenkins (CT) 84.28	(Netherlands) Derk Telnekes 91.66	6 – 3	(Netherlands) Martijn Kleermaker 90.81
(England) James Richardson (Q) 89.38	6 – 4	(Australia) Darren Penhall 88.25	(Netherlands) Kevin Doets (DT) 89.65	6 – 1	(England) Alfie Thompson (Q) 80.36

==== Second round (best of eleven legs) ====
Player	Score	Player	Player	Score	Player
(England) Scott Baker 87.82	5 – 6	(England) Mark McGeeney 99.33	(Canada) Jeff Smith 97.94	5 – 6	(Greece) John Michael 94.88
(England) David Pallett 80.80	3 – 6	(Netherlands) Kevin Doets (DT) 88.51	(England) Jason Heaver (Q) 80.01	4 – 6	(Northern Ireland) Kyle McKinstry (CT) 87.67
(Finland) Marko Kantele 89.10	0 – 6	(Netherlands) Dirk van Duijvenbode 94.93	(England) Scott Waites 100.26	6 – 1	(Netherlands) Geert Nentjes 93.88
(Sweden) Daniel Larsson 90.96	5 – 6	(Belgium) Mike De Decker 88.80	(England) Bradley Brooks 90.49	6 – 3	(Wales) Nick Kenny 77.93
(England) Harry Ward 90.70	6 – 5	(Northern Ireland) Gavin Carlin 90.83	(England) Kirk Shepherd 77.95	2 – 6	(Hong Kong) Kai Fan Leung 89.01
(Czech Republic) Karel Sedláček 87.51	6 – 2	(Wales) Barrie Bates 82.43	(England) Rhys Hayden (Q) 87.27	6 – 4	(England) James Richardson (Q) 87.15
(England) Andy Boulton 87.15	6 – 2	(England) Reece Robinson 81.42	(England) Nathan Derry 85.43	3 – 6	(Netherlands) Maik Kuivenhoven 95.35
(Wales) Justin Smith (Q) 95.11	5 – 6	(Netherlands) Wesley Harms 88.67	(Netherlands) Derk Telnekes 83.76	3 – 6	(Latvia) Madars Razma 89.22
(Wales) Jonathan Worsley 83.39	6 – 4	(England) Matt Clark 79.33	(England) Carl Wilkinson 87.02	2 – 6	(Germany) Steffen Siepmann 91.81
(England) Ted Evetts 82.80	6 – 1	(Netherlands) Berry van Peer (CT) 80.46	(England) Steve Brown 98.63	3 – 6	(England) Alan Tabern 97.29
(New Zealand) Cody Harris (CT) 88.49	1 – 6	(England) Jason Lowe 91.35	(England) Martin Atkins 89.70	6 – 2	(Germany) Christian Bunse 86.21
(Netherlands) Mike van Duivenbode 84.67	1 – 6	(Northern Ireland) Nathan Rafferty (DT) 94.01	(Netherlands) Niels Zonneveld 95.50	6 – 4	(England) Andy Hamilton 97.49
(Austria) Rowby-John Rodriguez 91.60	5 – 6	(England) Jason Askew (Q) 91.18	(England) Peter Jacques 86.57	3 – 6	(Netherlands) Yordi Meeuwisse 91.40
(Wales) Lewy Williams (Q) 97.47	6 – 3	(England) Adrian Gray 94.05	(Austria) Harald Leitinger 84.98	3 – 6	(England) Joe Murnan 94.45
(England) Stephen Burton (CT) 81.09	6 – 4	(Netherlands) Vincent van der Meer 85.34	(England) Wayne Jones 89.30	3 – 6	(England) Conan Whitehead 92.67
(Netherlands) Danny van Trijp (DT) 94.23	0 – 6	(Scotland) William Borland 98.02	(England) Adam Smith-Neale (Q) 85.71	3 – 6	(England) Callan Rydz 85.07

==== Third round (best of eleven legs) ====
Player	Score	Player	Player	Score	Player
(England) Luke Humphries 98.79	6 – 5	(Australia) Kyle Anderson 92.24	(Belgium) Kim Huybrechts 83.93	6 – 1	(Scotland) Robert Thornton 75.90
(England) Josh Payne 89.98	6 – 4	(England) Luke Woodhouse 86.49	(England) Ryan Searle 94.29	6 – 5	(Spain) Cristo Reyes 88.46
(Republic of Ireland) William O'Connor 99.85	6 – 2	(Netherlands) Jan Dekker 92.43	(Netherlands) Vincent van der Voort 85.63	6 – 4	(Greece) John Michael 84.22
(Scotland) William Borland 94.01	6 – 5	(Belgium) Mike De Decker 91.73	(Netherlands) Ron Meulenkamp 92.26	4 – 6	(England) Richard North 92.62
(England) Conan Whitehead 92.92	2 – 6	(England) Steve West 94.88	(South Africa) Devon Petersen 92.50	4 – 6	(England) Bradley Brooks 86.59
(Netherlands) Wesley Harms 93.18	5 – 6	(England) Martin Atkins 89.23	(England) Stephen Burton (CT) 85.73	2 – 6	(Northern Ireland) Kyle McKinstry (CT) 88.94
(Wales) Jamie Lewis 94.01	6 – 5	(England) Ross Smith 95.57	(England) Ted Evetts 86.83	4 – 6	(England) James Wilson 91.04
(Republic of Ireland) Steve Lennon 98.89	4 – 6	(England) Alan Tabern 100.32	(Northern Ireland) Mickey Mansell 80.86	2 – 6	(Netherlands) Niels Zonneveld 90.98
(England) Justin Pipe 96.37	6 – 3	(Hong Kong) Kai Fan Leung 86.18	(England) Ryan Joyce 99.30	6 – 2	(Netherlands) Yordi Meeuwisse 86.03
(Portugal) José de Sousa 90.29	4 – 6	(Wales) Lewy Williams (Q) 91.11	(Northern Ireland) Nathan Rafferty (DT) 88.70	2 – 6	(England) Jamie Hughes 96.30
(Netherlands) Maik Kuivenhoven 96.64	3 – 6	(Germany) Gabriel Clemens 97.81	(Lithuania) Darius Labanauskas 89.80	3 – 6	(Netherlands) Dirk van Duijvenbode 92.89
(England) Rhys Hayden (Q) 85.90	6 – 2	(Spain) Toni Alcinas 82.69	(England) Matthew Edgar 84.19	6 – 3	(England) Callan Rydz 81.41
(Germany) Martin Schindler 84.60	6 – 4	(Netherlands) Benito van de Pas 85.55	(England) Mark McGeeney 91.59	4 – 6	(England) Andy Boulton 94.13
(Wales) Jonathan Worsley 91.77	3 – 6	(England) Jason Lowe 99.50	(Latvia) Madars Razma 87.83	2 – 6	(England) Scott Waites 91.34
(Netherlands) Jelle Klaasen 94.15	6 – 4	(England) Jason Askew (Q) 86.89	(England) Harry Ward 88.60	6 – 3	(Germany) Steffen Siepmann 80.92
(Netherlands) Kevin Doets (DT) 90.40	5 – 6	(England) Simon Stevenson 98.96	(Czech Republic) Karel Sedláček 82.97	3 – 6	(England) Joe Murnan 91.27

==== Fourth round (best of nineteen legs) ====
Player	Score	Player	Player	Score	Player
(Wales) Gerwyn Price 104.23	10 – 3	(Netherlands) Danny Noppert 92.34	(England) Glen Durrant 96.14	8 – 10	(Scotland) Peter Wright 102.30
(Netherlands) Michael van Gerwen 105.48	10 – 8	(England) Nathan Aspinall 97.69	(Scotland) Gary Anderson 99.38	10 – 7	(England) Steve Beaton 91.06
(England) Rhys Hayden (Q) 84.80	5 – 10	(Belgium) Dimitri Van den Bergh 91.75	(England) Dave Chisnall 92.99	8 – 10	(Republic of Ireland) William O'Connor 96.05
(Netherlands) Vincent van der Voort 89.30	9 – 10	(England) Stephen Bunting 90.59	(Poland) Krzysztof Ratajski 105.29	9 – 10	(England) Chris Dobey 105.06
(England) Harry Ward 90.42	6 – 10	(England) Ian White 99.29	(Austria) Mensur Suljović 92.61	10 – 4	(Wales) Jamie Lewis 88.03
(England) Ryan Joyce 95.29	9 – 10	(Germany) Gabriel Clemens 99.48	(England) Michael Smith 96.80	10 – 4	(England) James Wilson 87.10
(Belgium) Kim Huybrechts 96.16	10 – 8	(England) Ryan Searle 95.92	(England) Richard North 90.89	6 – 10	(England) Alan Tabern 92.45
(Netherlands) Dirk van Duijvenbode 95.30	10 – 9	(Netherlands) Jermaine Wattimena 91.53	(Netherlands) Jeffrey de Zwaan 96.47	7 – 10	(Australia) Simon Whitlock 97.11
(Northern Ireland) Kyle McKinstry (CT) 91.97	10 – 8	(England) Bradley Brooks 88.82	(England) Rob Cross 91.64	10 – 7	(Netherlands) Niels Zonneveld 85.60
(England) Joe Cullen 93.15	10 – 7	(England) Mervyn King 84.38	(England) Adrian Lewis 94.91	4 – 10	(England) Jason Lowe 99.82
(Scotland) William Borland 83.46	5 – 10	(Netherlands) Jelle Klaasen 92.81	(England) Joe Murnan 88.05	4 – 10	(England) Ricky Evans 92.66
(England) Simon Stevenson 85.43	10 – 9	(England) Darren Webster 90.52	(Wales) Jonny Clayton 103.58	10 – 7	(England) Scott Waites 94.04
(England) Luke Humphries 91.04	8 – 10	(England) Andy Boulton 89.16	(Wales) Lewy Williams (Q) 84.25	9 – 10	(England) Steve West 84.52
(England) Matthew Edgar 85.27	10 – 5	(England) Josh Payne 85.66	(England) James Wade 90.92	10 – 5	(Scotland) John Henderson 90.93
(England) Keegan Brown 98.19	9 – 10	(Northern Ireland) Daryl Gurney 98.60	(England) Justin Pipe 83.27	2 – 10	(Germany) Martin Schindler 103.21
(Northern Ireland) Brendan Dolan 95.26	9 – 10	(England) Jamie Hughes 100.50	(England) Martin Atkins	w/o	Bye

=== Saturday 7 March ===
==== Fifth round (best of nineteen legs) ====
Player	Score	Player	Player	Score	Player
(Australia) Simon Whitlock 92.57	5 – 10	(England) Chris Dobey 98.45	(England) Jason Lowe 95.15	9 – 10	(Netherlands) Michael van Gerwen 95.63
(Scotland) Peter Wright 101.49	10 – 6	(England) Ian White 98.52	(England) Rob Cross 93.73	10 – 9	(England) Michael Smith 98.87
(Northern Ireland) Daryl Gurney 94.86	10 – 9	(Republic of Ireland) William O'Connor 91.22	(Wales) Gerwyn Price 98.60	10 – 3	(England) Ricky Evans 89.92
(England) James Wade 95.88	10 – 1	(Belgium) Kim Huybrechts 88.55	(Scotland) Gary Anderson 91.29	10 – 5	(England) Simon Stevenson 88.38
(England) Joe Cullen 93.12	4 – 10	(Wales) Jonny Clayton 101.60	(Netherlands) Dirk van Duijvenbode 95.58	7 – 10	(Austria) Mensur Suljović 91.67
(England) Stephen Bunting 102.31	10 – 2	(England) Alan Tabern 94.22	(England) Matthew Edgar 81.49	4 – 10	(Belgium) Dimitri Van den Bergh 92.01
(England) Jamie Hughes 91.48	10 – 7	(England) Martin Atkins 88.99	(Netherlands) Jelle Klaasen 97.41	10 – 1	(England) Steve West 88.43
(Northern Ireland) Kyle McKinstry (CT) 97.98	10 – 5	(Germany) Martin Schindler 90.82	(England) Andy Boulton 90.76	6 – 10	(Germany) Gabriel Clemens 99.47

==== Sixth round (best of nineteen legs) ====
Player	Score	Player	Player	Score	Player
(Wales) Gerwyn Price 102.87	10 – 9	(Germany) Gabriel Clemens 97.33	(England) James Wade 92.49	4 – 10	(Netherlands) Michael van Gerwen 109.85
(Netherlands) Jelle Klaasen 93.01	10 – 9	(Scotland) Gary Anderson 94.06	(Scotland) Peter Wright 101.78	6 – 10	(Northern Ireland) Daryl Gurney 99.33
(England) Chris Dobey 95.55	8 – 10	(Wales) Jonny Clayton 99.23	(England) Jamie Hughes 90.70	10 – 5	(Austria) Mensur Suljović 91.43
(Belgium) Dimitri Van den Bergh 94.11	10 – 8	(Northern Ireland) Kyle McKinstry (CT) 89.67	(England) Rob Cross 94.46	10 – 8	(England) Stephen Bunting 91.20

=== Sunday 8 March ===
==== Quarter-finals (best of nineteen legs) ====
Player	Score	Player
(Belgium) Dimitri Van den Bergh 102.38	5 – 10	(Wales) Gerwyn Price 102.29
(Netherlands) Michael van Gerwen 110.81	10 – 4	(England) Rob Cross 95.12
(Northern Ireland) Daryl Gurney 95.26	10 – 9	(Netherlands) Jelle Klaasen 94.62
(England) Jamie Hughes 90.57	9 – 10	(Wales) Jonny Clayton 91.38

==== Semi-finals and Final ====
Semi-finals (best of 21 legs)
(Wales) Gerwyn Price 102.39	11
(Wales) Jonny Clayton 90.64	4
(Netherlands) Michael van Gerwen 110.32	11
(Northern Ireland) Daryl Gurney 96.76	3

Final (best of 21 legs)
(Wales) Gerwyn Price 99.16	9
(Netherlands) Michael van Gerwen 101.42	11
