= 2019 German Darts Championship =

Tournament information
- Dates: 29–31 March 2019
- Venue: Halle 39
- Location: Hildesheim
- Country: Germany
- Organisation(s): PDC
- Format: Legs
- Prize fund: £140,000
- Winner's share: £25,000
- Nine-dart finish: (England) James Wade
- High checkout: 167 (England) Ricky Evans (Northern Ireland) Daryl Gurney

Champion(s)
- (Northern Ireland) Daryl Gurney

The 2019 German Darts Championship was the second of thirteen PDC European Tour events on the 2019 PDC Pro Tour. The tournament took place at Halle 39, Hildesheim, Germany, from 29–31 March 2019. It featured a field of 48 players and £140,000 in prize money, with £25,000 going to the winner.

Michael van Gerwen was the defending champion after defeating James Wilson 8–6 in the final of the 2018 tournament, but he was defeated 6–4 in the second round by Keegan Brown.

Daryl Gurney won his first European Tour title, by defeating Ricky Evans 8–6 in the final.

James Wade hit the second nine-dart finish of the 2019 European Tour season in his third round defeat to Darren Webster.

== Prize money ==
This is how the prize money is divided:

Stage (num. of players)		Prize money
Winner	(1)	£25,000
Runner-up	(1)	£10,000
Semi-finalists	(2)	£6,500
Quarter-finalists	(4)	£5,000
Third round losers	(8)	£3,000
Second round losers	(16)	£2,000*
First round losers	(16)	£1,000
Total	£140,000	

- Seeded players who lose in the second round do not receive this prize money on any Orders of Merit.

== Qualification and format ==
The top 16 entrants from the PDC ProTour Order of Merit on 12 February will automatically qualify for the event and will be seeded in the second round.

The remaining 32 places will go to players from six qualifying events – 18 from the UK Tour Card Holder Qualifier (held on 22 February), six from the European Tour Card Holder Qualifier (held on 22 February), two from the West & South European Associate Member Qualifier (held on 28 March), four from the Host Nation Qualifier (held on 28 March), one from the Nordic & Baltic Qualifier (held on 5 October 2018) and one from the East European Associate Member Qualifier (held on 19 January).

From 2019, the Host Nation, Nordic & Baltic and East European Qualifiers will only be available to non-tour card holders. Any tour card holders from the applicable regions will have to play the main European Qualifier. The only exceptions being that the Nordic & Baltic qualifiers for the first 3 European Tour events took place in late 2018, before the new ruling was announced.

Michael Smith, who was set to be the 8th seed, withdrew prior to the tournament draw. All seeds below him moved up a place, with James Wilson becoming sixteenth seed, and an extra place being made available in the host nation qualifier.

The following players will take part in the tournament:

Top 16

1. (Netherlands) Michael van Gerwen (second round)
2. (England) Ian White (third round)
3. (Scotland) Peter Wright (quarter-finals)
4. (England) James Wade (third round)
5. (Austria) Mensur Suljović (second round)
6. (England) Adrian Lewis (semi-finals)
7. (England) Rob Cross (third round)
8. (Wales) Gerwyn Price (quarter-finals)
9. (Wales) Jonny Clayton (third round)
10. (Northern Ireland) Daryl Gurney (champion)
11. (England) Joe Cullen (third round)
12. (England) Dave Chisnall (second round)
13. (England) Darren Webster (quarter-finals)
14. (Netherlands) Jermaine Wattimena (third round)
15. (England) Stephen Bunting (quarter-finals)
16. (England) James Wilson (third round)

UK Qualifier
- (England) Mervyn King (third round)
- (England) Martin Atkins (Leeds) (first round)
- (England) Ricky Evans (runner-up)
- (England) Steve Beaton (first round)
- (England) Dave Prins (first round)
- (England) Luke Humphries (second round)
- (England) Andrew Gilding (second round)
- (England) Jamie Hughes (second round)
- (England) Josh Payne (first round)
- (Northern Ireland) Mickey Mansell (first round)
- (England) Mark Dudbridge (second round)
- (England) Scott Taylor (first round)
- (England) Simon Stevenson (second round)
- (England) Nathan Aspinall (second round)
- (England) Andy Boulton (second round)
- (Scotland) Robert Thornton (first round)
- (England) Keegan Brown (semi-finals)

European Qualifier
- (Poland) Tytus Kanik (first round)
- (Netherlands) Mario Robbe (second round)
- (Belgium) Dimitri Van den Bergh (second round)
- (Netherlands) Ron Meulenkamp (second round)
- (Germany) Gabriel Clemens (first round)
- (Latvia) Madars Razma (first round)

West/South European Qualifier
- (Brazil) Diogo Portela (first round)
- (Belgium) Mike De Decker (first round)

Host Nation Qualifier
- (Germany) Kevin Knopf (second round)
- (Germany) Mike Holz (first round)
- (Germany) Maik Langendorf (first round)
- (Germany) Steffen Siepmann (second round)
- (Germany) Jyhan Artut (first round)

Nordic & Baltic Qualifier
- (Finland) Kim Viljanen (first round)

East European Qualifier
- (Russia) Boris Koltsov (second round)

== Draw ==
First round (best of 11 legs); 29 March
(England) Keegan Brown 91.29	6
(Latvia) Madars Razma 88.27	5
(Germany) Maik Langendorf 78.41	3
(Netherlands) Mario Robbe 84.36	6
(England) Mark Dudbridge 89.15	6
(Germany) Gabriel Clemens 85.05	4
(England) Dave Prins 88.33	2
(England) Simon Stevenson 96.29	6
(England) Ricky Evans 88.65	6
(Scotland) Robert Thornton 93.10	4
(Brazil) Diogo Portela 82.96	4
(England) Mervyn King 88.12	6
(Germany) Jyhan Artut 75.10	0
(Russia) Boris Koltsov 96.97	6
(England) Martin Atkins 90.95	2
(England) Luke Humphries 100.71	6
(Poland) Tytus Kanik 93.18	4
(England) Jamie Hughes 99.08	6
(England) Steve Beaton 89.88	4
(Belgium) Dimitri Van den Bergh 92.40	6
(Netherlands) Ron Meulenkamp 85.43	6
(Finland) Kim Viljanen 90.19	4
(England) Josh Payne 88.08	4
(England) Andy Boulton 98.14	6
(Germany) Kevin Knopf 72.75	6
(England) Scott Taylor 76.11	4
(Germany) Mike Holz 93.03	1
(England) Nathan Aspinall 104.54	6
(Belgium) Mike De Decker 92.55	3
(England) Andrew Gilding 98.02	6
(Germany) Steffen Siepmann 90.07	6
(Northern Ireland) Mickey Mansell 81.92	2

Second round (best of 11 legs); 30 March
1	(Netherlands) Michael van Gerwen 108.10	4
(England) Keegan Brown 104.12	6
16	(England) James Wilson 87.69	6
(Netherlands) Mario Robbe 85.47	5
8	(Wales) Gerwyn Price 95.55	6
(England) Mark Dudbridge 88.07	2
9	(Wales) Jonny Clayton 97.24	6
(England) Simon Stevenson 90.10	2
5	(Austria) Mensur Suljović 91.99	4
(England) Ricky Evans 96.43	6
12	(England) Dave Chisnall 94.04	3
(England) Mervyn King 95.51	6
4	(England) James Wade 91.76	6
(Russia) Boris Koltsov 89.36	1
13	(England) Darren Webster 91.42	6
(England) Luke Humphries 95.24	5
2	(England) Ian White 104.79	6
(England) Jamie Hughes 107.21	5
15	(England) Stephen Bunting 95.56	6
(Belgium) Dimitri Van den Bergh 96.38	5
7	(England) Rob Cross 99.96	6
(Netherlands) Ron Meulenkamp 97.66	4
10	(Northern Ireland) Daryl Gurney 98.46	6
(England) Andy Boulton 97.28	1
6	(England) Adrian Lewis 87.39	6
(Germany) Kevin Knopf 78.36	3
11	(England) Joe Cullen 101.49	6
(England) Nathan Aspinall 101.25	4
3	(Scotland) Peter Wright 96.46	6
(England) Andrew Gilding 87.65	3
14	(Netherlands) Jermaine Wattimena 90.71	6
(Germany) Steffen Siepmann 79.35	1

Third round (best of 11 legs); 31 March
(England) Brown 99.10	6
16	(England) Wilson 85.67	0
8	(Wales) Price 102.56	6
9	(Wales) Clayton 97.65	1
(England) Evans 101.68	6
(England) King 97.52	4
4	(England) Wade 105.64	5
13	(England) Webster 101.68	6
2	(England) White 96.48	4
15	(England) Bunting 92.90	6
7	(England) Cross 92.90	2
10	(Northern Ireland) Gurney 94.97	6
6	(England) Lewis 109.97	6
11	(England) Cullen 89.75	2
3	(Scotland) Wright 96.44	6
14	(Netherlands) Wattimena 100.33	3

Quarter-finals (best of 11 legs); 31 March
(England) Brown 94.88	6
8	(Wales) Price 93.70	5
(England) Evans 100.41	6
13	(England) Webster 94.20	5
15	(England) Bunting 91.33	5
10	(Northern Ireland) Gurney 89.87	6
6	(England) Lewis 99.00	6
3	(Scotland) Wright 98.59	2

Semi-finals (best of 13 legs); 31 March
(England) Brown 91.63	3
(England) Evans 98.63	7
10	(Northern Ireland) Gurney 100.31	7
6	(England) Lewis 100.34	5

Final (best of 15 legs); 31 March
(England) Evans 97.19	6
10	(Northern Ireland) Gurney 98.32	8
