= 2019 UK Open =

2019 Ladbrokes UK Open

Tournament information
- Dates: 1–3 March 2019
- Venue: Butlin's Minehead
- Location: Minehead, England
- Organisation(s): Professional Darts Corporation (PDC)
- Format: Legs; Final – best of 21
- Prize fund: £450,000
- Winner's share: £100,000
- High checkout: 170; Nathan Aspinall (x2); Ryan Searle; Mensur Suljović

Champion(s)
- (England) Nathan Aspinall

The 2019 Ladbrokes UK Open was a darts tournament staged by the Professional Darts Corporation. It was the seventeenth year of the tournament where players compete in a single elimination tournament to be crowned champion. The tournament was being held for the sixth time at the Butlin's Resort in Minehead, England, from 1 to 3 March 2019, and has the nickname, "the FA Cup of darts" as a random draw is staged after each round following the conclusion of the third round until the final.

Gary Anderson was the defending champion after defeating Corey Cadby 11–7 in the 2018 final. He was making his first public appearance since having to withdraw from both the 2019 Masters and the 2019 Premier League due to a persistent back injury, whilst Cadby was absent from this year’s competition due to visa problems. However, Anderson lost 8–10 in the fourth round to Steve Beaton.

Nathan Aspinall won his first PDC major televised title, beating Rob Cross 11–5 in the final and hitting 170 checkout to win the match.

== Prize money ==
The prize fund increased from last year's edition to £450,000.

Stage (no. of players)		Prize money (Total: £450,000)
Winner	(1)	£100,000
Runner-up	(1)	£40,000
Semi-finalists	(2)	£20,000
Quarter-finalists	(4)	£12,500
Last 16 (sixth round)	(8)	£7,500
Last 32 (fifth round)	(16)	£4,000
Last 64 (fourth round)	(32)	£2,000
Last 96 (third round)	(32)	£1,000
Last 128 (second round)	(32)	n/a
Last 160 (first round)	(31)	n/a

== Change ==
In a significant change of format, the tournament has increased from 128 to 160 participants. Also, the ProTour UK Open Qualifiers have been scrapped in favour of a new system. All 128 PDC Tour Card holders automatically qualify, along with the Top 16 from the 2018 PDC Challenge Tour, plus 16 qualifiers from the Riley's Qualifiers taking place in early 2019. Due to Corey Cadby‘s withdrawal from the competition the field is reduced to 159 players who will now compete in this year’s tournament.

=== Format ===
The 159 participants will enter the competition incrementally, with 63 players entering in the first round, with match winners joining the 32 players entering in the second and third rounds to leave the last 64 in the fourth round.

- No players are seeded.
- A random draw is held for each of the following rounds following the conclusion of the third round.
- All matches in the first, second and third rounds will be played over best of 11 legs.
- All matches in the fourth, fifth, sixth rounds and quarter-finals will be played over best of 19 legs.
- All matches in the semi-finals and final will be played over best of 21 legs.
- Eight boards will be used for matches in the first, second, third and fourth rounds.
- Four boards will be used for matches in the fifth round.
- Two boards will be used for matches in the sixth round.
- One board will be used for all the matches in the quarter-finals, semi-finals and final.

== Qualifiers ==
=== Number 1–32 of the PDC Order of Merit (receiving byes into fourth round) ===
1. (Netherlands) Michael van Gerwen
2. (England) Rob Cross
3. (Scotland) Peter Wright
4. (Scotland) Gary Anderson
5. (Northern Ireland) Daryl Gurney
6. (England) Michael Smith
7. (Wales) Gerwyn Price
8. (Austria) Mensur Suljović
9. (England) James Wade
10. (Australia) Simon Whitlock
11. (England) Dave Chisnall
12. (England) Ian White
13. (England) Darren Webster
14. (England) Joe Cullen
15. (Wales) Jonny Clayton
16. (England) Adrian Lewis
17. (England) Stephen Bunting
18. (England) Mervyn King
19. (Scotland) John Henderson
20. (England) Steve West
21. (Australia) Kyle Anderson
22. (England) Steve Beaton
23. (Belgium) Kim Huybrechts
24. (Netherlands) Jermaine Wattimena
25. (England) James Wilson
26. (Wales) Jamie Lewis
27. (England) Alan Norris
28. (Netherlands) Jelle Klaasen
29. (Netherlands) Raymond van Barneveld
30. (Germany) Max Hopp
31. (Netherlands) Benito van de Pas
32. (Spain) Cristo Reyes

=== Number 33–64 of the PDC Order of Merit (receiving byes into third round) ===
33. (Belgium) Dimitri Van den Bergh
34. (England) Nathan Aspinall
35. (England) Chris Dobey
36. (Republic of Ireland) Steve Lennon
37. (Netherlands) Vincent van der Voort
38. (England) Keegan Brown
39. (England) Richard North
40. (Scotland) Robert Thornton
41. (Northern Ireland) Brendan Dolan
42. (England) Justin Pipe
43. (Netherlands) Jeffrey de Zwaan
44. (Netherlands) Danny Noppert
45. (Netherlands) Jan Dekker
46. (Republic of Ireland) William O'Connor
47. (England) Ricky Evans
48. (Germany) Martin Schindler
49. (Spain) Toni Alcinas
50. (England) Ryan Searle
51. (England) Ryan Joyce
52. (Netherlands) Ron Meulenkamp
53. (Poland) Krzysztof Ratajski
54. (England) Josh Payne
55. (England) James Richardson
56. (England) Luke Humphries
57. (Wales) Mark Webster
58. (Netherlands) Christian Kist
59. (Germany) Gabriel Clemens
60. (South Africa) Devon Petersen
61. (Austria) Zoran Lerchbacher
62. (Belgium) Ronny Huybrechts
63. (Northern Ireland) Mickey Mansell
64. (Australia) ~~Corey Cadby~~ (Note: Corey Cadby withdrew from the tournament prior to the draw. All players below him moved up one place, with a bye being added to the first round)
65. (England) Alan Tabern

=== Number 65–96 of the PDC Order of Merit (receiving byes into second round) ===
66. (England) Ross Smith
67. (England) Matthew Edgar
68. (England) Simon Stevenson
69. (Wales) Robert Owen
70. (England) Wayne Jones
71. (Germany) Robert Marijanović
72. (England) Adam Hunt
73. (Northern Ireland) Kevin Burness
74. (England) Glen Durrant
75. (England) Luke Woodhouse
76. (England) Ryan Meikle
77. (Netherlands) Dirk van Duijvenbode
78. (Poland) Tytus Kanik
79. (England) Arron Monk
80. (England) Bradley Brooks
81. (England) Peter Hudson
82. (Belgium) Davy Van Baelen
83. (Canada) Dawson Murschell
84. (Netherlands) Vincent Kamphuis
85. (Netherlands) Mario Robbe
86. (Spain) José Justicia
87. (England) Mark Wilson
88. (England) Ryan Harrington
89. (England) Mark Dudbridge
90. (England) George Killington
91. (England) Scott Baker
92. (England) Gary Eastwood
93. (Scotland) John Goldie
94. (England) Tony Newell
95. (Northern Ireland) Gavin Carlin
96. (England) Harry Ward
97. (England) Andy Boulton

=== Number 97–128 of the PDC Order of Merit (starting in first round) ===
98. (England) Eddie Dootson
99. (England) Terry Temple
100. (Lithuania) Darius Labanauskas
101. (England) Ted Evetts
102. (England) Carl Wilkinson
103. (England) Jamie Hughes
104. (Wales) Jonathan Worsley
105. (Portugal) José de Sousa
106. (England) Mark McGeeney
107. (Austria) Rowby-John Rodriguez
108. (Wales) Barrie Bates
109. (England) David Pallett
110. (Greece) John Michael
111. (England) Kirk Shepherd
112. (Netherlands) Maik Kuivenhoven
113. (England) Nathan Derry
114. (England) Adrian Gray
115. (England) Conan Whitehead
116. (Netherlands) Geert Nentjes
117. (Latvia) Madars Razma
118. (England) Matt Clark
119. (Netherlands) Yordi Meeuwisse
120. (England) Joe Murnan
121. (England) Reece Robinson
122. (Netherlands) Vincent van der Meer
123. (Germany) Christian Bunse
124. (Scotland) Jamie Bain
125. (Finland) Marko Kantele
126. (Netherlands) Niels Zonneveld
127. (England) Michael Barnard
128. (Netherlands) Mike van Duivenbode

=== PDC Challenge Tour qualifiers (starting in first round) ===
The top 16 ranked players from the 2018 Challenge Tour Order of Merit who didn't have a Tour Card for the 2019 season qualified for the first round.

1. (New Zealand) Cody Harris
2. (Scotland) Cameron Menzies
3. (England) Martin Atkins (Wigan)
4. (Sweden) Dennis Nilsson
5. (England) David Evans
6. (England) Simon Preston
7. (England) Adam Huckvale
8. (Austria) Michael Rasztovits
9. (Republic of Ireland) Jason Cullen
10. (Brazil) Diogo Portela
11. (England) Jarred Cole
12. (England) Mark Frost
13. (England) Matthew Dennant
14. (Scotland) Darren Beveridge
15. (Wales) John Davey
16. (England) Lee Budgen

=== Rileys amateur qualifiers (starting in first round) ===
16 amateur players will qualify from 16 Riley's Sports Bar qualifiers held across the UK between 26 January and 24 February.

- (England) Michael Burgoine
- (England) Shaun Fox
- (England) Lee Harris
- (England) Scott Taylor
- (England) Wes Newton
- (Scotland) Mark Barilli
- (England) Kevin Thoburn
- (Wales) Lloyd Browning
- (England) Ian McFarlane
- (England) Andy Jenkins
- (England) Chris Lacey
- (England) Rob Collins
- (England) Barry Lynn
- (England) Daniel Day
- (England) Callan Rydz
- (Belgium) Brian Raman

== Draw ==
=== Friday 1 March ===
==== First round (best of eleven legs) ====
Player	Score	Player	Player	Score	Player
(England) Mark McGeeney 97.92	6 – 3	(England) David Pallett 91.40	(England) Wes Newton (Q) 86.56	4 – 6	(Scotland) Cameron Menzies (CT) 86.15
(England) Barry Lynn (Q) 75.48	4 – 6	(Austria) Michael Rasztovits (CT) 80.74	(England) Jamie Hughes 97.89	6 – 3	(England) Callan Rydz (Q) 90.94
(Sweden) Dennis Nilsson (CT) 83.13	2 – 6	(Latvia) Madars Razma 97.76	(Netherlands) Mike van Duivenbode 85.92	2 – 6	(England) Ted Evetts 95.76
(England) Scott Taylor (Q) 99.41	6 – 4	(Lithuania) Darius Labanauskas 95.98	(England) Conan Whitehead 95.40	6 – 3	(England) Michael Burgoine (Q) 88.38
(England) Shaun Fox (Q) 74.50	1 – 6	(England) Andy Jenkins (Q) 92.87	(England) Joe Murnan 85.22	6 – 3	(England) Mark Frost (CT) 78.95
(Brazil) Diogo Portela (CT) 87.71	6 – 4	(Wales) Barrie Bates 83.40	(England) Adam Huckvale (CT) 88.87	6 – 3	(Scotland) Mark Barilli (Q) 85.43
(Netherlands) Geert Nentjes 90.28	6 – 5	(England) David Evans (CT) 88.94	(New Zealand) Cody Harris (CT) 92.69	6 – 5	(Wales) John Davey (CT) 84.67
(England) Kirk Shepherd 88.95	6 – 2	(Wales) Jonathan Worsley 86.06	(Portugal) José de Sousa 84.56	6 – 4	(Belgium) Brian Raman (Q) 84.44
(England) Nathan Derry 93.00	6 – 4	(England) Lee Budgen (CT) 86.64	(Netherlands) Vincent van der Meer 87.36	6 – 1	(England) Eddie Dootson 76.72
(England) Matt Clark 90.11	6 – 3	(Netherlands) Niels Zonneveld 83.72	(England) Jarred Cole (CT) 82.62	6 – 4	(England) Michael Barnard 75.94
(Republic of Ireland) Jason Cullen (CT) 84.74	3 – 6	(England) Reece Robinson 88.27	(Germany) Christian Bunse 83.22	4 – 6	(Greece) John Michael 90.85
(England) Martin Atkins (CT) 82.65	3 – 6	(Scotland) Jamie Bain 89.01	(Finland) Marko Kantele 93.45	6 – 2	(England) Chris Lacey (Q) 81.05
(Wales) Lloyd Browning (Q) 76.08	6 – 5	(England) Lee Harris (Q) 78.77	(England) Kevin Thoburn (Q) 83.26	6 – 5	(England) Matthew Dennant (CT) 85.87
(England) Adrian Gray 81.14	6 – 1	(England) Ian McFarlane (Q) 76.41	(England) Daniel Day (Q) 81.48	1 – 6	(Netherlands) Maik Kuivenhoven 94.24
(England) Carl Wilkinson 85.31	4 – 6	(Netherlands) Yordi Meeuwisse 83.62	(England) Terry Temple 78.29	5 – 6	(England) Simon Preston (CT) 78.79
(England) Rob Collins (Q) 83.82	6 – 1	(Austria) Rowby-John Rodriguez 77.05	(Scotland) Darren Beveridge (CT)	w/o	Bye

==== Second round (best of eleven legs) ====
Player	Score	Player	Player	Score	Player
(Canada) Dawson Murschell 79.40	3 – 6	(England) Ross Smith 89.73	(England) Glen Durrant 98.60	6 – 1	(Netherlands) Maik Kuivenhoven 87.33
(Brazil) Diogo Portela (CT) 101.03	1 – 6	(England) Jamie Hughes 107.72	(England) Scott Taylor (Q) 87.44	6 – 3	(Northern Ireland) Kevin Burness 78.00
(England) Wayne Jones 83.54	2 – 6	(Netherlands) Vincent Kamphuis 86.09	(New Zealand) Cody Harris (CT) 86.02	2 – 6	(England) Adam Hunt 94.43
(England) Simon Preston (CT) 84.66	3 – 6	(England) Arron Monk 95.65	(England) Kirk Shepherd 99.80	6 – 4	(England) Bradley Brooks 97.91
(England) Mark Wilson 82.04	4 – 6	(England) Mark Dudbridge 83.54	(Latvia) Madars Razma 84.72	6 – 3	(England) Mark McGeeney 85.14
(England) Ted Evetts 92.57	3 – 6	(England) George Killington 91.88	(England) Rob Collins (Q) 85.08	3 – 6	(England) Andy Boulton 89.35
(England) Matthew Edgar 90.41	6 – 4	(England) Gary Eastwood 84.54	(England) Harry Ward 90.71	6 – 3	(Wales) Lloyd Browning (Q) 81.72
(Scotland) Cameron Menzies (CT)	t/o	(Scotland) Jamie Bain	(England) Nathan Derry 91.15	6 – 4	(Netherlands) Vincent van der Meer 92.31
(Germany) Robert Marijanović 90.70	3 – 6	(Belgium) Davy Van Baelen 89.92	(England) Andy Jenkins (Q) 89.43	5 – 6	(Netherlands) Mario Robbe 84.67
(England) Simon Stevenson 88.07	6 – 2	(England) Adrian Gray 78.22	(Northern Ireland) Gavin Carlin 92.68	6 – 2	(Greece) John Michael 89.05
(England) Scott Baker 90.89	6 – 2	(England) Ryan Harrington 88.54	(England) Tony Newell 81.56	4 – 6	(England) Adam Huckvale (CT) 84.98
(Poland) Tytus Kanik 80.25	0 – 6	(Netherlands) Yordi Meeuwisse 92.97	(Austria) Michael Rasztovits (CT) 83.90	6 – 5	(England) Conan Whitehead 81.91
(England) Peter Hudson 84.60	6 – 3	(Scotland) John Goldie 82.03	(Netherlands) Geert Nentjes 93.15	6 – 3	(England) Jarred Cole (CT) 82.11
(Wales) Robert Owen 92.44	6 – 4	(Finland) Marko Kantele 86.79	(England) Joe Murnan 85.64	6 – 4	(England) Ryan Meikle 84.74
(Scotland) Darren Beveridge (CT) 94.34	2 – 6	(England) Luke Woodhouse 96.31	(England) Reece Robinson 89.03	6 – 1	(Portugal) José de Sousa 89.84
(Spain) José Justicia 98.14	6 – 2	(England) Kevin Thoburn (Q) 83.62	(Netherlands) Dirk van Duijvenbode 87.38	6 – 3	(England) Matt Clark 81.81

==== Third round (best of eleven legs) ====
Player	Score	Player	Player	Score	Player
(England) Luke Humphries 99.34	6 – 1	(Netherlands) Vincent van der Voort 87.95	(Spain) Toni Alcinas 86.39	3 – 6	(England) Nathan Aspinall 97.40
(England) Ricky Evans 81.49	6 – 4	(Spain) José Justicia 77.42	(Belgium) Dimitri Van den Bergh 101.33	6 – 0	(England) Kirk Shepherd 86.66
(Northern Ireland) Mickey Mansell 91.41	6 – 1	(Netherlands) Danny Noppert 84.30	(England) James Richardson 77.72	0 – 6	(Republic of Ireland) Steve Lennon 92.02
(England) Scott Baker 85.44	4 – 6	(Poland) Krzysztof Ratajski 88.64	(South Africa) Devon Petersen 81.09	2 – 6	(England) Jamie Hughes 90.83
(Germany) Gabriel Clemens 93.50	6 – 2	(Austria) Zoran Lerchbacher 85.54	(England) Luke Woodhouse 95.17	6 – 4	(England) Chris Dobey 87.66
(England) Simon Stevenson 97.65	6 – 3	(Wales) Mark Webster 91.72	(Northern Ireland) Gavin Carlin 89.17	6 – 2	(England) Glen Durrant 85.11
(England) Richard North 89.83	6 – 5	(Belgium) Ronny Huybrechts 85.17	(England) Ryan Joyce 90.97	6 – 3	(Wales) Robert Owen 87.46
(Scotland) Jamie Bain 81.82	3 – 6	(England) Josh Payne 87.40	(England) Reece Robinson 76.44	6 – 4	(Netherlands) Dirk van Duijvenbode 83.63
(England) Mark Dudbridge 79.60	5 – 6	(Republic of Ireland) William O'Connor 86.27	(Netherlands) Mario Robbe 84.34	2 – 6	(Netherlands) Jeffrey de Zwaan 93.94
(England) Andy Boulton 84.33	4 – 6	(Netherlands) Christian Kist 85.04	(Netherlands) Vincent Kamphuis 91.82	3 – 6	(England) Scott Taylor (Q) 99.20
(England) Matthew Edgar 87.02	3 – 6	(England) Ryan Searle 91.86	(England) Harry Ward 96.52	4 – 6	(Netherlands) Jan Dekker 97.99
(England) Arron Monk 94.35	6 – 5	(Scotland) Robert Thornton 88.09	(England) George Killington 81.81	4 – 6	(Latvia) Madars Razma 80.57
(Belgium) Davy Van Baelen 94.21	4 – 6	(Germany) Martin Schindler 94.97	(England) Adam Huckvale (CT) 78.74	2 – 6	(Northern Ireland) Brendan Dolan 88.09
(England) Nathan Derry 91.40	5 – 6	(England) Keegan Brown 94.25	(Netherlands) Yordi Meeuwisse 87.80	3 – 6	(England) Ross Smith 90.46
(Netherlands) Ron Meulenkamp 91.08	5 – 6	(England) Adam Hunt 88.48	(Netherlands) Geert Nentjes 94.93	6 – 0	(England) Justin Pipe 86.14
(England) Joe Murnan 83.86	6 – 4	(England) Alan Tabern 85.70	(Austria) Michael Rasztovits (CT) 90.08	2 – 6	(England) Peter Hudson 91.41

==== Fourth round (best of nineteen legs) ====
Player	Score	Player	Player	Score	Player
(Netherlands) Jelle Klaasen 83.76	4 – 10	(Latvia) Madars Razma 86.77	(England) James Wilson 84.33	1 – 10	(England) James Wade 100.45
(England) Stephen Bunting 90.76	6 – 10	(Republic of Ireland) Steve Lennon 92.31	(Netherlands) Geert Nentjes 89.74	3 – 10	(Germany) Max Hopp 102.58
(England) Peter Hudson 90.48	3 – 10	(Belgium) Kim Huybrechts 94.11	(Germany) Martin Schindler 84.55	10 – 7	(England) Adam Hunt 87.54
(Netherlands) Raymond van Barneveld 94.00	7 – 10	(England) Simon Stevenson 96.53	(Netherlands) Jeffrey de Zwaan 80.74	2 – 10	(Netherlands) Jermaine Wattimena 88.66
(Netherlands) Benito van de Pas 86.60	3 – 10	(Germany) Gabriel Clemens 94.82	(England) Luke Woodhouse 96.13	10 – 7	(Northern Ireland) Gavin Carlin 96.49
(England) Joe Murnan 93.22	4 – 10	(Poland) Krzysztof Ratajski 99.44	(England) Ricky Evans 84.95	5 – 10	(Belgium) Dimitri Van den Bergh 90.64
(Netherlands) Jan Dekker 88.32	3 – 10	(Australia) Simon Whitlock 94.27	(Republic of Ireland) William O'Connor 89.03	4 – 10	(England) Keegan Brown 95.14
(England) Nathan Aspinall 93.70	10 – 9	(Netherlands) Christian Kist 94.57	(England) Jamie Hughes 101.28	10 – 5	(England) Ian White 100.38
(Austria) Mensur Suljović 101.28	10 – 8	(Scotland) Peter Wright 106.04	(Northern Ireland) Daryl Gurney 80.50	10 – 1	(England) Reece Robinson 71.78
(Scotland) John Henderson 88.35	5 – 10	(England) Michael Smith 95.93	(England) Josh Payne 96.96	10 – 2	(Australia) Kyle Anderson 91.34
(Wales) Jonny Clayton 88.69	10 – 3	(England) Arron Monk 90.03	(Netherlands) Michael van Gerwen 96.73	6 – 10	(England) Mervyn King 95.96
(Northern Ireland) Mickey Mansell 89.55	10 – 9	(England) Scott Taylor (Q) 80.59	(England) Steve Beaton 98.63	10 – 8	(Scotland) Gary Anderson 99.92
(England) Joe Cullen 94.76	6 – 10	(Wales) Gerwyn Price 96.16	(Spain) Cristo Reyes 86.28	10 – 2	(England) Ryan Joyce 86.27
(England) Alan Norris 79.68	5 – 10	(England) Ross Smith 86.20	(Northern Ireland) Brendan Dolan 88.67	4 – 10	(England) Richard North 92.82
(England) Dave Chisnall 98.42	10 – 8	(England) Luke Humphries 96.53	(England) Ryan Searle 97.39	4 – 10	(England) Steve West 97.25
(England) Adrian Lewis 95.36	9 – 10	(Wales) Jamie Lewis 96.18	(England) Rob Cross 99.12	10 – 4	(England) Darren Webster 96.12

=== Saturday 2 March ===
==== Fifth round (best of nineteen legs) ====
Player	Score	Player	Player	Score	Player
(England) Steve Beaton 96.62	10 – 8	(England) Keegan Brown 92.90	(Wales) Jonny Clayton 93.66	7 – 10	(Poland) Krzysztof Ratajski 99.33
(Northern Ireland) Daryl Gurney 97.52	9 – 10	(England) Michael Smith 98.30	(England) James Wade 91.98	10 – 7	(Germany) Max Hopp 95.72
(England) Nathan Aspinall 97.83	10 – 2	(Latvia) Madars Razma 92.06	(Wales) Gerwyn Price 101.84	10 – 7	(England) Jamie Hughes 97.70
(Australia) Simon Whitlock 88.30	10 – 8	(Germany) Gabriel Clemens 87.82	(Belgium) Kim Huybrechts 84.24	6 – 10	(England) Simon Stevenson 90.43
(Netherlands) Jermaine Wattimena 93.66	10 – 8	(England) Luke Woodhouse 91.85	(Republic of Ireland) Steve Lennon 98.69	10 – 8	(Northern Ireland) Mickey Mansell 91.73
(Wales) Jamie Lewis 88.33	7 – 10	(England) Josh Payne 98.55	(Austria) Mensur Suljović 97.55	9 – 10	(Belgium) Dimitri Van den Bergh 97.37
(England) Dave Chisnall 96.07	10 – 5	(Germany) Martin Schindler 90.78	(England) Rob Cross 97.09	10 – 5	(England) Mervyn King 93.84
(England) Steve West 91.48	5 – 10	(England) Ross Smith 95.87	(Spain) Cristo Reyes 84.02	10 – 7	(England) Richard North 83.04

==== Sixth round (best of nineteen legs) ====
Player	Score	Player
(England) Rob Cross 93.52	10 – 6	(Spain) Cristo Reyes 83.80
(Poland) Krzysztof Ratajski 95.02	3 – 10	(Wales) Gerwyn Price 104.57
(England) Steve Beaton 85.96	10 – 8	(Belgium) Dimitri Van den Bergh 85.11
(England) Michael Smith 101.56	10 – 3	(Netherlands) Jermaine Wattimena 85.60
(England) Dave Chisnall 90.13	9 – 10	(England) Simon Stevenson 90.73
(England) James Wade 91.51	7 – 10	(England) Ross Smith 96.68
(Australia) Simon Whitlock 92.52	7 – 10	(England) Josh Payne 91.57
(England) Nathan Aspinall 90.54	10 – 8	(Republic of Ireland) Steve Lennon 92.24

=== Sunday 3 March ===
==== Quarter-finals (best of nineteen legs) ====
Player	Score	Player
(England) Rob Cross 95.03	10 – 7	(England) Josh Payne 97.34
(England) Michael Smith 100.97	10 – 1	(England) Steve Beaton 93.15
(England) Simon Stevenson 93.69	5 – 10	(Wales) Gerwyn Price 100.21
(England) Nathan Aspinall 96.33	10 – 6	(England) Ross Smith 91.98

==== Semi-finals and final ====
Semi-finals (best of 21 legs)
(Wales) Gerwyn Price 95.37	9
(England) Nathan Aspinall 94.31	11
(England) Rob Cross 94.23	11
(England) Michael Smith 95.51	7

Final (best of 21 legs)
(England) Nathan Aspinall 88.72	11
(England) Rob Cross 84.79	5
