= 2015 PDC World Youth Championship =

2015 PDC Unicorn World Youth Championship

Tournament information
- Dates: 19 October 2015; 29 November 2015 (final)
- Venue: Butlins Minehead Resort
- Location: Minehead
- Country: England
- Organisation(s): PDC
- Format: Legs first to 6
- Prize fund: £50,000
- Winner's share: £10,000

Champion(s)
- (Germany) Max Hopp

The 2015 PDC Unicorn World Youth Championship was the fifth edition of the PDC World Youth Championship, a tournament organised by the Professional Darts Corporation for darts players aged between 16 and 23.

The knockout stages, from the last 64 to the semi-finals, were held in Wigan on 19 October 2015. The final took place on 29 November 2015, preceding the final of the 2015 Players Championship Finals, which was broadcast live on ITV4.

Keegan Brown was the defending champion but he was eliminated in the first round by Rowby-John Rodriguez in a rematch of the 2014 final.

The championship final was contested between Max Hopp and Nathan Aspinall at the Butlins Minehead Resortin Minehead, with Hopp securing a 6-5 victory.

== Prize money ==
Position (no. of players)		Prize money (Total: £50,000)
Winner	(1)	£10,000
Runner-up	(1)	£5,000
Semi-finalists	(2)	£2,500
Quarter-finalists	(4)	£1,500
Third round	(8)	£1,000
Second round	(16)	£500
First round	(32)	£250

== Qualification ==
The tournament featured 64 players. The top 51 players in the PDC Development Tour Order of Merit automatically qualified for the tournament, with the top eight players being seeded. They were joined by 13 international qualifiers.

The participants are:

1-51

1. (Belgium) Dimitri van den Bergh
2. (England) Josh Payne
3. (Scotland) Bradley Kirk
4. (Belgium) Mike De Decker
5. (Wales) Dean Reynolds
6. (Netherlands) Benito van de Pas
7. (England) Nathan Aspinall
8. (Netherlands) Berry van Peer
9. (Wales) Nick Kenny
10. (England) Shaun Griffiths
11. (England) Adam Hunt
12. (England) Aden Kirk
13. (Austria) Rowby-John Rodriguez
14. (England) Sam Hewson
15. (England) Aaron Dyer
16. (England) Keegan Brown
17. (Netherlands) Mike Zuydwijk
18. (England) James Hubbard
19. (England) Reece Robinson
20. (Wales) Jamie Lewis
21. (Netherlands) Sven Groen
22. (England) Ted Evetts
23. (Netherlands) John de Kruijf
24. (Netherlands) Jeffrey de Zwaan
25. (Germany) Max Hopp
26. (England) Harry Ward
27. (England) Chris Quantock
28. (Netherlands) Dirk van Duijvenbode
29. (Wales) Kurt Parry
30. (Austria) Roxy-James Rodriguez
31. (England) George Killington
32. (England) Sam Head
33. (England) Matthew Dicken
34. (England) Lewis Venes
35. (England) Jack Tweddell
36. (England) Josh McCarthy
37. (England) Joshua Richardson
38. (Netherlands) Ryan de Vreede
39. (England) Adam Smith-Neale
40. (England) James Thompson
41. (England) Jake Jones
42. (England) Tommy Lishman
43. (Wales) Rhys Griffin
44. (England) Jordan Matthews
45. (England) Scott Dale
46. (Netherlands) Wouter Vaes
47. (England) Scott Taylor
48. (Netherlands) Jimmy Hendriks
49. (England) Ryan Meikle
50. (England) Nicholas Day
51. (Republic of Ireland) Steve Lennon

International qualifiers

- (United States) Andrew Briere
- (India) Piyush Chauhan
- (Germany) Kai Gotthardt
- (Austria) Fredi Gselmann
- (Australia) Robbie King
- (Germany) Thomas Luksch
- (Canada) Dawson Murschell
- (Belgium) Kenny Neyens
- (Republic of Ireland) James O'Toole
- (India) Sarthak Patel
- (Republic of Ireland) Stephen Rosney
- (Australia) Jamie Rundle
- (Netherlands) Kevin de Vries
- (Australia) Adam Leek

Celtic qualifiers

- (Isle of Man) Callum Brew

== Draw ==
=== Preliminary round ===
- (Isle of Man) Callum Brew 5 – 6 Andrew Briere (United States)
- (Australia) Adam Leek 4 – 6 Nick Kenny (Wales)

=== Last 64 ===
First round (best of 11 legs); 19 October
1	(Belgium) Dimitri van den Bergh	4
(Wales) Nick Kenny	6
(England) Tommy Lishman	4
(Netherlands) Jeffrey de Zwaan	6
(Netherlands) Wouter Vaes	6
(England) Jake Jones	4
(England) Joshua Richardson	6
(United States) Andrew Briere	1
8	(Netherlands) Berry van Peer	6
(England) Aaron Dyer	3
(Germany) Max Hopp	6
(Republic of Ireland) Stephen Rosney	1
(England) Jordan Matthews	2
(Belgium) Kenny Neyens	6
(England) Ryan Meikle	0
(Wales) Jamie Lewis	6
5	(Wales) Dean Reynolds	6
(Australia) Robbie King	3
(India) Piyush Chauhan	1
(England) James Hubbard	6
(England) Shaun Griffiths	6
(England) Nicholas Day	1
(England) Chris Quantock	6
(England) Adam Smith-Neale	2
4	(Belgium) Mike De Decker	6
(Canada) Dawson Murschell	2
(Netherlands) Sven Groen	4
(England) Sam Hewson	6
(England) Scott Taylor	6
(Austria) Fredi Gselmann	3
(England) Ted Evetts	6
(England) Harry Ward	4
2	(England) Josh Payne	6
(Netherlands) Mike Zuydwijk	5
(England) Keegan Brown	4
(Austria) Rowby-John Rodriguez	6
(England) Aden Kirk	6
(England) Lewis Venes	3
(England) Jack Tweddell	6
(Australia) Jamie Rundle	0
7	(England) Nathan Aspinall	6
(England) James Thompson	4
(England) Sam Head	6
(Netherlands) Dirk van Duijvenbode	2
(Netherlands) John de Kruijf	2
(England) Scott Dale	6
(Wales) Kurt Parry	6
(Republic of Ireland) Steve Lennon	5
6	(Netherlands) Benito van de Pas	6
(Wales) Rhys Griffin	0
(Netherlands) Ryan de Vreede	3
(England) Matthew Dicken	6
(Austria) Roxy-James Rodriguez	6
(Germany) Kai Gotthardt	2
(England) George Killington	1
(Netherlands) Kevin de Vries	6
3	(Scotland) Bradley Kirk	6
(England) Josh McCarthy	1
(England) Adam Hunt	6
(Republic of Ireland) James O'Toole	0
(England) Reece Robinson	3
(Netherlands) Jimmy Hendriks	6
(India) Sarthak Patel	2
(Germany) Thomas Luksch	6

Second round (best of 11 legs); 19 October
(Wales) Nick Kenny	3
(Netherlands) Jeffrey de Zwaan	6
(Netherlands) Wouter Vaes	6
(England) Joshua Richardson	4
8	(Netherlands) Berry van Peer	1
(Germany) Max Hopp	6
(Belgium) Kenny Neyens	6
(Wales) Jamie Lewis	4
5	(Wales) Dean Reynolds	6
(England) James Hubbard	2
(England) Shaun Griffiths	6
(England) Chris Quantock	3
4	(Belgium) Mike De Decker	1
(England) Sam Hewson	6
(England) Scott Taylor	6
(England) Ted Evetts	5
2	(England) Josh Payne	6
(Austria) Rowby-John Rodriguez	3
(England) Aden Kirk	4
(England) Jack Tweddell	6
7	(England) Nathan Aspinall	6
(England) Sam Head	5
(England) Scott Dale	6
(Wales) Kurt Parry	1
6	(Netherlands) Benito van de Pas	6
(England) Matthew Dicken	2
(Austria) Roxy-James Rodriguez	6
(Netherlands) Kevin de Vries	0
3	(Scotland) Bradley Kirk	6
(England) Adam Hunt	2
(Netherlands) Jimmy Hendriks	6
(Germany) Thomas Luksch	3

Third round (best of 11 legs); 19 October
(Netherlands) Jeffrey de Zwaan	6
(Netherlands) Wouter Vaes	4
(Germany) Max Hopp	6
(Belgium) Kenny Neyens	3
5	(Wales) Dean Reynolds	6
(England) Shaun Griffiths	4
(England) Sam Hewson	5
(England) Scott Taylor	6
2	(England) Josh Payne	6
(England) Jack Tweddell	2
7	(England) Nathan Aspinall	6
(England) Scott Dale	5
6	(Netherlands) Benito van de Pas	3
(Austria) Roxy-James Rodriguez	6
3	(Scotland) Bradley Kirk	6
(Netherlands) Jimmy Hendriks	1

Quarter-finals (best of 11 legs); 19 October
(Netherlands) Jeffrey de Zwaan	4
(Germany) Max Hopp	6
5	(Wales) Dean Reynolds	6
(England) Scott Taylor	5
2	(England) Josh Payne	4
7	(England) Nathan Aspinall	6
(Austria) Roxy-James Rodriguez	6
3	(Scotland) Bradley Kirk	3

Semi-finals (best of 11 legs); 19 October
(Germany) Max Hopp	6
5	(Wales) Dean Reynolds	5
7	(England) Nathan Aspinall	6
(Austria) Roxy-James Rodriguez	3

Final (best of 11 legs); 29 November
(Germany) Max Hopp	6
7	(England) Nathan Aspinall	5
