= 2018 Players Championship Finals =

2018 Ladbrokes Players Championship Finals

Tournament information
- Dates: 23–25 November 2018
- Venue: Butlin's Minehead
- Location: Minehead, England
- Organisation(s): Professional Darts Corporation (PDC)
- Format: Legs
- Prize fund: £460,000
- Winner's share: £100,000
- High checkout: 170 Daryl Gurney

Champion(s)
- Daryl Gurney (NIR)

The 2018 Ladbrokes Players Championship Finals was the eleventh edition of the PDC darts tournament, which saw the top 64 players from the 22 Players Championship events of 2018 taking part. The tournament took place from 23 to 25 November 2018 at Butlin's Resort in Minehead.

Daryl Gurney won his 2nd major PDC title by defeating defending champion Michael van Gerwen 11–9, bringing an end to his 22-match winning streak in the competition.

== Prize money ==
The 2018 Players Championship Finals had a total prize fund of £460,000, the same as 2017. The following is the breakdown of the fund:

Position (no. of players)		Prize money (Total: £460,000)
Winner	(1)	£100,000
Runner-Up	(1)	£40,000
Semi-finalists	(2)	£23,000
Quarter-finalists	(4)	£12,500
Last 16 (Third round)	(8)	£8,000
Last 32 (Second round)	(16)	£5,000
Last 64 (First round)	(32)	£2,500

== Qualification ==
The top 64 players from the Players Championships Order of Merit, which is solely based on prize money won in the twenty-two Players Championships events during the season, qualified for the tournament:

On 20 November, Mensur Suljović withdrew from the tournament citing family reasons. Under the rules of the tournament, the next highest qualifier took his place, which happened to be Benito van de Pas, with no draw adjustments being made.

Click on the seed number of a player to go to their draw section.

=== Top 64 in the Players Championship Order of Merit ===
1. (England) Ian White (Second round)
2. (Scotland) Gary Anderson (Semi-finals)
3. (Netherlands) Michael van Gerwen (Runner-up)
4. (Scotland) Peter Wright (Third round)
5. (England) Adrian Lewis (Second round)
6. (England) Rob Cross (First round)
7. (England) Michael Smith (Second round)
8. (England) James Wade (Third round)
9. (England) Dave Chisnall (Second round)
10. (Netherlands) Jeffrey de Zwaan (Second round)
11. (England) James Wilson (Second round)
12. (Netherlands) Danny Noppert (Semi-finals)
13. (England) Stephen Bunting (Quarter-finals)
14. (Netherlands) Jermaine Wattimena (First round)
15. (England) Steve Beaton (Second round)
16. (Northern Ireland) Daryl Gurney (Winner)
17. (England) Josh Payne (First round)
18. (Scotland) John Henderson (First round)
19. (England) Darren Webster (Second round)
20. (Northern Ireland) Mickey Mansell (First round)
21. (England) Mervyn King (Second round)
22. (Germany) Gabriel Clemens (Third round)
23. (England) Ricky Evans (Third round)
24. (England) Chris Dobey (Quarter-finals)
25. (England) Nathan Aspinall (Second round)
26. (Wales) Jonny Clayton (Quarter-finals)
27. (England) Ryan Joyce (First round)
28. (Poland) Krzysztof Ratajski (Third round)
29. (Germany) Max Hopp (Second round)
30. (England) Keegan Brown (Second round)
31. (Australia) Simon Whitlock (Second round)
32. (Northern Ireland) Brendan Dolan (Third round)
33. (England) Michael Barnard (First round)
34. (Australia) Kyle Anderson (First round)
35. ~~(Austria) Mensur Suljović (Withdrew)~~
36. (England) Steve West (First round)
37. (Wales) Gerwyn Price (First round)
38. (Republic of Ireland) Steve Lennon (Quarter-finals)
39. (Wales) Mark Webster (First round)
40. (Germany) Martin Schindler (First round)
41. (Netherlands) Ron Meulenkamp (First round)
42. (Netherlands) Jan Dekker (First round)
43. (England) Andrew Gilding (First round)
44. (England) Simon Stevenson (First round)
45. (Latvia) Madars Razma (Second round)
46. (Netherlands) Jeffrey de Graaf (First round)
47. (England) Joe Cullen (Third round)
48. (England) Ryan Searle (Second round)
49. (Scotland) Robert Thornton (First round)
50. (Belgium) Kim Huybrechts (First round)
51. (England) Stephen Burton (Third round)
52. (England) Richard North (First round)
53. (Austria) Rowby-John Rodriguez (First round)
54. (Belgium) Dimitri Van den Bergh (First round)
55. (Netherlands) Jelle Klaasen (First round)
56. (Wales) Jamie Lewis (First round)
57. (England) Ross Smith (First round)
58. (Netherlands) Vincent van der Voort (First round)
59. (Spain) Cristo Reyes (Second round)
60. (England) Adam Hunt (First round)
61. (Spain) Toni Alcinas (First round)
62. (England) Matthew Edgar (First round)
63. (England) Alan Tabern (First round)
64. (England) Scott Taylor (First round)
65. (Netherlands) Benito van de Pas (Alternate, First round)

== Draw ==
There was no draw held, all players were put in a fixed bracket by their seeding positions.

=== Finals ===
Quarter-finals (best of 19 legs); 25 November
16	(Northern Ireland) Daryl Gurney 103.91	10
24	(England) Chris Dobey 94.43	2
12	(Netherlands) Danny Noppert 95.06	10
13	(England) Stephen Bunting 100.18	7
2	(Scotland) Gary Anderson 110.02	10
26	(Wales) Jonny Clayton 95.14	4
38	(Republic of Ireland) Steve Lennon 94.92	3
3	(Netherlands) Michael van Gerwen 101.09	10

Semi-finals (best of 21 legs); 25 November
16	(Northern Ireland) Daryl Gurney 98.15	11
12	(Netherlands) Danny Noppert 94.10	3
2	(Scotland) Gary Anderson 103.03	9
3	(Netherlands) Michael van Gerwen 102.62	11

Final (best of 21 legs); 25 November
16	(Northern Ireland) Daryl Gurney 95.61	11
3	(Netherlands) Michael van Gerwen 100.20	9

=== Top half ===
==== Section 1 ====
First round (best of 11 legs); 23 November
1	(England) Ian White 111.12	6
64	(England) Scott Taylor 92.91	2
32	(Northern Ireland) Brendan Dolan 92.12	6
33	(England) Michael Barnard 93.42	4
16	(Northern Ireland) Daryl Gurney 86.63	6
49	(Scotland) Robert Thornton 82.70	3
17	(England) Josh Payne 89.67	2
48	(England) Ryan Searle 93.23	6
8	(England) James Wade 94.52	6
57	(England) Ross Smith 89.74	4
25	(England) Nathan Aspinall 96.93	6
40	(Germany) Martin Schindler 85.31	1
9	(England) Dave Chisnall 97.33	6
56	(Wales) Jamie Lewis 93.94	4
24	(England) Chris Dobey 93.98	6
41	(Netherlands) Ron Meulenkamp 90.18	3

Second round (best of 11 legs); 24 November
1	(England) Ian White 85.59	3
32	(Northern Ireland) Brendan Dolan 86.51	6
16	(Northern Ireland) Daryl Gurney 96.92	6
48	(England) Ryan Searle 93.63	5
8	(England) James Wade 98.57	6
25	(England) Nathan Aspinall 96.02	4
9	(England) Dave Chisnall 92.82	3
24	(England) Chris Dobey 93.59	6

Third round (best of 19 legs); 24 November
32	(Northern Ireland) Brendan Dolan 94.39	6
16	(Northern Ireland) Daryl Gurney 101.79	10
8	(England) James Wade 89.00	9
24	(England) Chris Dobey 87.34	10

Quarter-finals (best of 19 legs); 25 November
16	(Northern Ireland) Daryl Gurney 103.91	10
24	(England) Chris Dobey 94.43	2

==== Section 2 ====
First round (best of 11 legs); 23 November
5	(England) Adrian Lewis 95.47	6
60	(England) Adam Hunt 83.85	2
28	(Poland) Krzysztof Ratajski 105.38	6
37	(Wales) Gerwyn Price 105.79	5
12	(Netherlands) Danny Noppert 93.39	6
53	(Austria) Rowby-John Rodriguez 83.61	3
21	(England) Mervyn King 78.20	6
44	(England) Simon Stevenson 77.31	4
4	(Scotland) Peter Wright 89.70	6
61	(Spain) Toni Alcinas 86.72	2
29	(Germany) Max Hopp 98.44	6
36	(England) Steve West 94.21	4
13	(England) Stephen Bunting 94.08	6
52	(England) Richard North 88.03	5
20	(Northern Ireland) Mickey Mansell 88.35	4
45	(Latvia) Madars Razma 89.23	6

Second round (best of 11 legs); 24 November
5	(England) Adrian Lewis 92.74	3
28	(Poland) Krzysztof Ratajski 93.62	6
12	(Netherlands) Danny Noppert 91.84	6
21	(England) Mervyn King 91.67	5
4	(Scotland) Peter Wright 93.73	6
29	(Germany) Max Hopp 90.08	2
13	(England) Stephen Bunting 84.00	6
45	(Latvia) Madars Razma 82.59	4

Third round (best of 19 legs); 24 November
28	(Poland) Krzysztof Ratajski 92.80	4
12	(Netherlands) Danny Noppert 92.33	10
4	(Scotland) Peter Wright 98.35	9
13	(England) Stephen Bunting 98.25	10

Quarter-finals (best of 19 legs); 25 November
12	(Netherlands) Danny Noppert 95.06	10
13	(England) Stephen Bunting 100.18	7

=== Bottom half ===
==== Section 3 ====
First round (best of 11 legs); 23 November
2	(Scotland) Gary Anderson 107.95	6
63	(England) Alan Tabern 82.99	2
31	(Australia) Simon Whitlock 92.55	6
34	(Australia) Kyle Anderson 91.37	4
15	(England) Steve Beaton 91.70	6
50	(Belgium) Kim Huybrechts 91.85	5
18	(Scotland) John Henderson 97.78	5
47	(England) Joe Cullen 93.87	6
7	(England) Michael Smith 98.02	6
58	(Netherlands) Vincent van der Voort 84.28	0
26	(Wales) Jonny Clayton 95.24	6
39	(Wales) Mark Webster 93.09	3
10	(Netherlands) Jeffrey de Zwaan 94.72	6
55	(Netherlands) Jelle Klaasen 84.72	4
23	(England) Ricky Evans 88.00	6
42	(Netherlands) Jan Dekker 81.35	3

Second round (best of 11 legs); 24 November
2	(Scotland) Gary Anderson 105.53	6
31	(Australia) Simon Whitlock 97.40	1
15	(England) Steve Beaton 94.98	4
47	(England) Joe Cullen 95.70	6
7	(England) Michael Smith 93.92	5
26	(Wales) Jonny Clayton 85.35	6
10	(Netherlands) Jeffrey de Zwaan 96.75	2
23	(England) Ricky Evans 98.34	6

Third round (best of 19 legs); 24 November
2	(Scotland) Gary Anderson 100.58	10
47	(England) Joe Cullen 91.78	2
26	(Wales) Jonny Clayton 89.62	10
23	(England) Ricky Evans 90.08	5

Quarter-finals (best of 19 legs); 25 November
2	(Scotland) Gary Anderson 110.02	10
26	(Wales) Jonny Clayton 95.14	4

==== Section 4 ====
First round (best of 11 legs); 23 November
6	(England) Rob Cross 93.72	1
59	(Spain) Cristo Reyes 96.98	6
27	(England) Ryan Joyce 91.08	2
38	(Republic of Ireland) Steve Lennon 97.11	6
11	(England) James Wilson 94.05	6
54	(Belgium) Dimitri Van den Bergh 93.31	2
22	(Germany) Gabriel Clemens 90.97	6
43	(England) Andrew Gilding 81.02	3
3	(Netherlands) Michael van Gerwen 102.78	6
62	(England) Matthew Edgar 90.44	1
30	(England) Keegan Brown 89.25	6
Alt/65	(Netherlands) Benito van de Pas 79.69	3
14	(Netherlands) Jermaine Wattimena 88.05	5
51	(England) Stephen Burton 95.65	6
19	(England) Darren Webster 90.49	6
46	(Netherlands) Jeffrey de Graaf 85.91	3

Second round (best of 11 legs); 24 November
59	(Spain) Cristo Reyes 81.19	5
38	(Republic of Ireland) Steve Lennon 79.34	6
11	(England) James Wilson 91.61	5
22	(Germany) Gabriel Clemens 99.34	6
3	(Netherlands) Michael van Gerwen 106.00	6
30	(England) Keegan Brown 89.34	1
51	(England) Stephen Burton 96.64	6
19	(England) Darren Webster 93.93	3

Third round (best of 19 legs); 24 November
38	(Republic of Ireland) Steve Lennon 92.35	10
22	(Germany) Gabriel Clemens 90.44	7
3	(Netherlands) Michael van Gerwen 104.06	10
51	(England) Stephen Burton 93.65	4

Quarter-finals (best of 19 legs); 25 November
38	(Republic of Ireland) Steve Lennon 94.92	3
3	(Netherlands) Michael van Gerwen 101.09	10
