= 2016 Players Championship Finals =

2016 Cash Converters Players Championship Finals

Tournament information
- Dates: 25–27 November 2016
- Venue: Butlin's Minehead
- Location: Minehead, England
- Organisation(s): Professional Darts Corporation (PDC)
- Format: Legs
- Prize fund: £400,000
- Winner's share: £75,000
- Nine-dart finish: Alan Norris
- High checkout: 170 Kim Huybrechts

Champion(s)
- (Netherlands) Michael van Gerwen

The 2016 Cash Converters Players Championship Finals was the ninth edition of the PDC darts tournament, the Players Championship Finals, which saw the top 64 players from the 20 Players Championship events of 2016 taking part, doubling the number of participants. The tournament took place at Butlin's Minehead in Minehead, England, between 25 and 27 November 2016.

Sixteen time world champion Phil Taylor was a notable absence at the tournament after failing to qualify, having played only three out of the 20 tournaments during the year.

Michael van Gerwen was the defending champion by beating Adrian Lewis 11–6 in the previous year's final, and van Gerwen would retain his Players Championship title, beating Dave Chisnall 11–3 in the final.

Alan Norris hit a nine-dart finish in his first-round match against Michael Smith, which was the first time it had ever happened in the tournament's history.

== Prize money ==
The 2016 Players Championship Finals will have a total prize fund of £400,000, a £100,000 increase since the previous staging of the tournament. The following is the breakdown of the fund:

| Position (no. of players) | | Prize money (Total: £400,000) |
|---|---|---|
| Winner | (1) | £75,000 |
| Runner-Up | (1) | £35,000 |
| Semi-finalists | (2) | £20,000 |
| Quarter-finalists | (4) | £11,500 |
| Last 16 (third round) | (8) | £7,500 |
| Last 32 (second round) | (16) | £5,000 |
| Last 64 (first round) | (32) | £2,000 |
| Nine-dart finish | (1) | £35,000 |

== Qualification ==
The 2016 tournament will see a change in terms of qualification. The top 64 players from the Players Championships Order of Merit, which is solely based on prize money won in the twenty Players Championships events during the season, will qualify for the tournament.

These are the qualifiers after the 20 events: On 21 November, it was announced that the #23 seed Kyle Anderson was forced to withdraw, owing to problems with his visa, so all the players below him moved up one ranking place, with Andy Hamilton moving into the #64 slot.

=== Top 64 in the Players Championship Order of Merit ===
1. (Netherlands) Michael van Gerwen (winner)
2. (Netherlands) Benito van de Pas (first round)
3. (England) Ian White (second round)
4. (Australia) Simon Whitlock (second round)
5. (Wales) Gerwyn Price (first round)
6. (England) Dave Chisnall (runner-up)
7. (Scotland) Peter Wright (semi-finals)
8. (Austria) Mensur Suljović (first round)
9. (England) Joe Cullen (third round)
10. (England) Stephen Bunting (first round)
11. (England) James Wilson (first round)
12. (England) Steve West (first round)
13. (England) Chris Dobey (first round)
14. (England) Steve Beaton (first round)
15. (Belgium) Kim Huybrechts (quarter-finals)
16. (England) Josh Payne (third round)
17. (Spain) Cristo Reyes (first round)
18. (Northern Ireland) Daryl Gurney (second round)
19. (England) Robbie Green (quarter-finals)
20. (England) Alan Norris (third round)
21. (England) Justin Pipe (third round)
22. (Netherlands) Jelle Klaasen (third round)
23. (Scotland) Gary Anderson (second round)
24. (Belgium) Ronny Huybrechts (first round)
25. (England) Adrian Lewis (second round)
26. (England) James Wade (second round)
27. (England) Jamie Caven (first round)
28. (Netherlands) Christian Kist (quarter-finals)
29. (England) Darren Webster (semi-finals)
30. (Wales) Mark Webster (first round)
31. (England) Joe Murnan (first round)
32. (Netherlands) Vincent van der Voort (second round)
33. (England) Andrew Gilding (first round)
34. (Netherlands) Jermaine Wattimena (second round)
35. (England) Terry Jenkins (third round)
36. (Wales) Jonny Clayton (first round)
37. (England) Ricky Evans (first round)
38. (Wales) Jamie Lewis (second round)
39. (England) Mervyn King (first round)
40. (Scotland) Robert Thornton (first round)
41. (Austria) Rowby-John Rodriguez (second round)
42. (Scotland) John Henderson (first round)
43. (England) Simon Stevenson (first round)
44. (England) Andy Jenkins (first round)
45. (England) Michael Smith (first round)
46. (South Africa) Devon Petersen (first round)
47. (England) Ronnie Baxter (first round)
48. (Netherlands) Berry van Peer (second round)
49. (England) Mark Walsh (first round)
50. (Northern Ireland) Mickey Mansell (first round)
51. (Netherlands) Jeffrey de Graaf (second round)
52. (Republic of Ireland) Mick McGowan (second round)
53. (Netherlands) Jan Dekker (second round)
54. (Netherlands) Vincent Kamphuis (second round)
55. (Netherlands) Ron Meulenkamp (third round)
56. (England) Steve Brown (first round)
57. (Netherlands) Raymond van Barneveld (quarter-finals)
58. (England) Jason Wilson (first round)
59. (England) Kevin Painter (first round)
60. (Belgium) Dimitri Van den Bergh (second round)
61. (England) Matthew Edgar (first round)
62. (England) Keegan Brown (first round)
63. (Northern Ireland) Brendan Dolan (third round)
64. (England) Andy Hamilton (first round)

== Draw ==
There was no draw held, but all players were put in a fixed bracket by their seeding positions.

=== Finals ===
Quarter-finals (best of 19 legs); 27 November
1 | (Netherlands) Michael van Gerwen 108.03 | 10
57 | (Netherlands) Raymond van Barneveld 103.00 | 5
28 | (Netherlands) Christian Kist 91.17 | 6
29 | (England) Darren Webster 91.30 | 10
15 | (Belgium) Kim Huybrechts 100.10 | 9
7 | (Scotland) Peter Wright 97.37 | 10
6 | (England) Dave Chisnall 93.17 | 10
19 | (England) Robbie Green 85.67 | 5

Semi-finals (best of 21 legs); 27 November
1 | (Netherlands) Michael van Gerwen 94.59 | 11
29 | (England) Darren Webster 89.45 | 8
7 | (Scotland) Peter Wright 98.06 | 8
6 | (England) Dave Chisnall 100.58 | 11

Final (best of 21 legs); 27 November
1 | (Netherlands) Michael van Gerwen 108.34 | 11
6 | (England) Dave Chisnall 99.24 | 3

=== Top half ===
==== Section 1 ====
First round (best of 11 legs); 25 November
1 | (Netherlands) Michael van Gerwen 95.08 | 6
64 | (England) Andy Hamilton 92.20 | 1
32 | (Netherlands) Vincent van der Voort 95.53 | 6
33 | (England) Andrew Gilding 87.81 | 5
16 | (England) Josh Payne 89.90 | 6
49 | (England) Mark Walsh 80.88 | 5
17 | (Spain) Cristo Reyes 87.31 | 5
48 | (Netherlands) Berry van Peer 81.42 | 6
8 | (Austria) Mensur Suljović 102.79 | 4
57 | (Netherlands) Raymond van Barneveld 107.40 | 6
25 | (England) Adrian Lewis 85.71 | 6
40 | (Scotland) Robert Thornton 81.59 | 3
9 | (England) Joe Cullen 84.05 | 6
56 | (England) Steve Brown 74.46 | 1
24 | (Belgium) Ronny Huybrechts 84.62 | 4
41 | (Austria) Rowby-John Rodriguez 80.93 | 6

Second round (best of 11 legs); 26 November
1 | (Netherlands) Michael van Gerwen 102.15 | 6
32 | (Netherlands) Vincent van der Voort 100.74 | 1
16 | (England) Josh Payne 85.07 | 6
48 | (Netherlands) Berry van Peer 88.47 | 4
57 | (Netherlands) Raymond van Barneveld 101.96 | 6
25 | (England) Adrian Lewis 101.22 | 4
9 | (England) Joe Cullen 101.33 | 6
41 | (Austria) Rowby-John Rodriguez 89.97 | 0

Third round (best of 19 legs); 26 November
1 | (Netherlands) Michael van Gerwen 105.69 | 10
16 | (England) Josh Payne 99.79 | 2
57 | (Netherlands) Raymond van Barneveld 87.84 | 10
9 | (England) Joe Cullen 71.13 | 2

Quarter-finals (best of 19 legs); 27 November
1 | (Netherlands) Michael van Gerwen 108.03 | 10
57 | (Netherlands) Raymond van Barneveld 103.00 | 5

==== Section 2 ====
First round (best of 11 legs); 25 November
5 | (Wales) Gerwyn Price 88.01 | 5
60 | (Belgium) Dimitri Van den Bergh 91.99 | 6
28 | (Netherlands) Christian Kist 94.11 | 6
37 | (England) Ricky Evans 94.48 | 4
12 | (England) Steve West 85.68 | 3
53 | (Netherlands) Jan Dekker 89.32 | 6
21 | (England) Justin Pipe 84.64 | 6
44 | (England) Andy Jenkins 83.21 | 3
4 | (Australia) Simon Whitlock 95.20 | 6
61 | (England) Matthew Edgar 89.20 | 3
29 | (England) Darren Webster 92.82 | 6
36 | (Wales) Jonny Clayton 92.46 | 3
13 | (England) Chris Dobey 95.04 | 3
52 | (Republic of Ireland) Mick McGowan 90.02 | 6
20 | (England) Alan Norris 106.24 | 6
45 | (England) Michael Smith 88.73 | 4

Second round (best of 11 legs); 26 November
60 | (Belgium) Dimitri Van den Bergh 85.68 | 2
28 | (Netherlands) Christian Kist 91.44 | 6
53 | (Netherlands) Jan Dekker 80.54 | 1
21 | (England) Justin Pipe 86.34 | 6
4 | (Australia) Simon Whitlock 92.56 | 3
29 | (England) Darren Webster 95.40 | 6
52 | (Republic of Ireland) Mick McGowan 87.73 | 3
20 | (England) Alan Norris 91.89 | 6

Third round (best of 19 legs); 26 November
28 | (Netherlands) Christian Kist 94.97 | 10
21 | (England) Justin Pipe 89.34 | 6
29 | (England) Darren Webster 90.08 | 10
20 | (England) Alan Norris 85.47 | 5

Quarter-finals (best of 19 legs); 27 November
28 | (Netherlands) Christian Kist 91.17 | 6
29 | (England) Darren Webster 91.30 | 10

=== Bottom half ===
==== Section 3 ====
First round (best of 11 legs); 25 November
2 | (Netherlands) Benito van de Pas 85.19 | 5
63 | (Northern Ireland) Brendan Dolan 92.47 | 6
31 | (England) Joe Murnan 78.50 | 0
34 | (Netherlands) Jermaine Wattimena 93.94 | 6
15 | (Belgium) Kim Huybrechts 91.27 | 6
50 | (Northern Ireland) Mickey Mansell 83.03 | 3
18 | (Northern Ireland) Daryl Gurney 89.63 | 6
47 | (England) Ronnie Baxter 91.69 | 3
7 | (Scotland) Peter Wright 94.17 | 6
58 | (England) Jason Wilson 83.34 | 3
26 | (England) James Wade 92.59 | 6
39 | (England) Mervyn King 90.36 | 4
10 | (England) Stephen Bunting 88.62 | 4
55 | (Netherlands) Ron Meulenkamp 93.08 | 6
23 | (Scotland) Gary Anderson 94.22 | 6
42 | (Scotland) John Henderson 90.60 | 3

Second round (best of 11 legs); 26 November
63 | (Northern Ireland) Brendan Dolan 85.05 | 6
34 | (Netherlands) Jermaine Wattimena 83.72 | 5
15 | (Belgium) Kim Huybrechts 108.10 | 6
18 | (Northern Ireland) Daryl Gurney 105.85 | 1
7 | (Scotland) Peter Wright 104.61 | 6
26 | (England) James Wade 94.02 | 2
55 | (Netherlands) Ron Meulenkamp 93.34 | 6
23 | (Scotland) Gary Anderson 101.61 | 5

Third round (best of 19 legs); 26 November
63 | (Northern Ireland) Brendan Dolan 88.18 | 4
15 | (Belgium) Kim Huybrechts 100.72 | 10
7 | (Scotland) Peter Wright 100.75 | 10
55 | (Netherlands) Ron Meulenkamp 84.67 | 3

Quarter-finals (best of 19 legs); 27 November
15 | (Belgium) Kim Huybrechts 100.10 | 9
7 | (Scotland) Peter Wright 97.37 | 10

==== Section 4 ====
First round (best of 11 legs); 25 November
6 | (England) Dave Chisnall 96.08 | 6
59 | (England) Kevin Painter 93.26 | 4
27 | (England) Jamie Caven 95.62 | 4
38 | (Wales) Jamie Lewis 90.80 | 6
11 | (England) James Wilson 90.92 | 2
54 | (Netherlands) Vincent Kamphuis 93.51 | 6
22 | (Netherlands) Jelle Klaasen 96.20 | 6
43 | (England) Simon Stevenson 95.96 | 4
3 | (England) Ian White 82.93 | 6
62 | (England) Keegan Brown 85.76 | 5
30 | (Wales) Mark Webster 92.55 | 3
35 | (England) Terry Jenkins 92.33 | 6
14 | (England) Steve Beaton 94.91 | 4
51 | (Netherlands) Jeffrey de Graaf 88.65 | 6
19 | (England) Robbie Green 93.33 | 6
46 | (South Africa) Devon Petersen 91.25 | 3

Second round (best of 11 legs); 26 November
6 | (England) Dave Chisnall 96.65 | 6
38 | (Wales) Jamie Lewis 95.96 | 4
54 | (Netherlands) Vincent Kamphuis 88.89 | 2
22 | (Netherlands) Jelle Klaasen 96.39 | 6
3 | (England) Ian White 85.85 | 5
35 | (England) Terry Jenkins 88.58 | 6
51 | (Netherlands) Jeffrey de Graaf 101.22 | 1
19 | (England) Robbie Green 105.79 | 6

Third round (best of 19 legs); 26 November
6 | (England) Dave Chisnall 94.84 | 10
22 | (Netherlands) Jelle Klaasen 91.67 | 9
35 | (England) Terry Jenkins 89.60 | 7
19 | (England) Robbie Green 96.89 | 10

Quarter-finals (best of 19 legs); 27 November
6 | (England) Dave Chisnall 93.17 | 10
19 | (England) Robbie Green 85.67 | 5
