= Ron Meulenkamp =

Dutch darts player (born 1988)

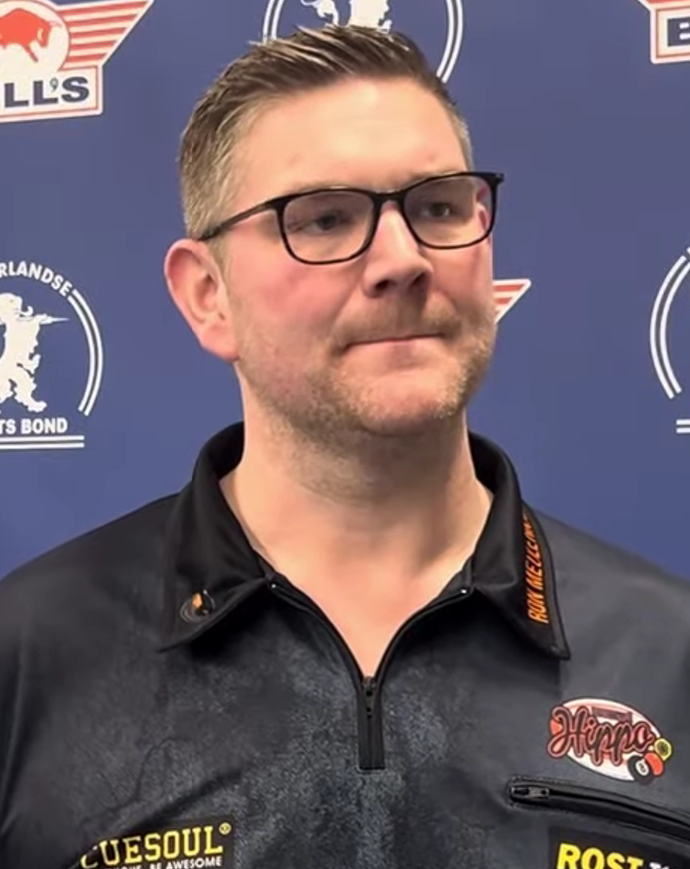
- Meulenkamp in 2026

Personal information
- Full name: Ronnie Meulenkamp
- Nickname: "The Bomb"
- Born: 5 November 1988 (age 37) Netherlands
- Home town: Almere, Netherlands

Sport
- Sport: Darts
- Playing since: 2002
- Darts: 23g One80 Signature
- Laterality: Left-handed
- Walk-on music: "Boom! Shake the Room" by DJ Jazzy Jeff & The Fresh Prince

Organisation (see split in darts)
- BDO: 2006–2014
- PDC: 2014–
- Current world ranking: (PDC) 215 ▼2 (18 October 2026)

WDF major events – best performances
- World Championship: Last 32: 2012, 2014
- World Masters: Last 32: 2013
- Finder Masters: Last 24 Group: 2009
- Dutch Open: Last 16: 2026

PDC premier events – best performances
- World Championship: Last 64: 2015, 2017, 2019, 2020, 2021, 2022
- World Grand Prix: Last 16: 2018
- UK Open: Last 32: 2017, 2018, 2021, 2022
- PC Finals: Last 16: 2016

Other tournament wins
- Years
| French Open | 2006 |
| Ouderkerk Open | 2011 |
| PDC Challenge Tour (x2) | 2014, 2023 |

Ronnie Meulenkamp (born 5 November 1988) is a Dutch darts player who competes in Professional Darts Corporation (PDC) events.

== Career ==
Meulenkamp was runner-up in both the 2011 Isle of Man Open and England Open. He was also a semi-finalist in the 2011 Mariflex Open, a quarter-finalist in the 2011 German Open and Belgium Open. He also enjoyed quarter-final spots in the 2010 Winmau World Masters and 2010 Zuiderduin Masters and reached the Last 16 in the 2011 BDO British Open and BDO International Open.

Meulenkamp attempted to acquire a PDC tour card at Q School in January 2014, but failed to finish in the top four on any given day or in the top 24 on the Order of Merit. However, for competing in the event he secured PDPA Associate Member Status which gave him entry to the UK Open and European Tour Qualifiers as well as the Challenge Tour. He failed to qualify for the UK Open, but in March won the second Challenge Tour event by edging out Alan Tabern 5–4. Meulenkamp reached the last 16 of a PDC Pro Tour event for the first time at the fourth Players Championship where he lost 6–5 to Ian White and went one better later in the year at the final event when he was eliminated in the quarter-finals 6–3 by James Wade.

As the second-highest non-qualified European player on the Pro Tour Order of Merit, Meulenkamp played in his first PDC World Championship in 2015. He faced Mark Webster with finishing proving to be the weakness in both players' games as they missed 64 darts at doubles between them. Meulenkamp had a checkout percentage of 19% and was beaten 3–1 in sets. He lost in the final of the Apatin Open to Boris Krčmar.

After winning two games during the first three days of 2016 Q School, Meulenkamp won five games on the final day to reach the final round where he lost 5–2 to Yordi Meeuwisse. However, he had done just enough to win a two-year tour card by claiming the final place through the Q School Order of Merit. At the Austrian Darts Open he progressed to the third round of a European Tour event for the first time by beating Jeffrey de Graaf and Simon Whitlock both 6–3, but lost 6–4 to Michael Smith. A pair of last 16 finishes in Players Championship events saw him qualify for the Finals. In the first round, he defeated Stephen Bunting 6–4, before knocking out world champion Gary Anderson in a last leg decider. He would lose to Peter Wright 10–3 in the third round.

Meulenkamp earned the final European Order of Merit spot to play in the 2017 World Championship. In the opening round he missed one dart to take the first set against Mensur Suljović and lost 3–0.

== World Championships results ==
=== BDO ===
- 2012: First round (lost to Gary Stone 0–3)
- 2014: First round (lost to Gary Robson 2–3)

=== PDC ===
- 2015: First round (lost to Mark Webster 1–3)
- 2017: First round (lost to Mensur Suljović 0–3)
- 2019: Second round (lost to Michael Smith 1–3)
- 2020: Second round (lost to Chris Dobey 2–3)
- 2021: Second round (lost to Vincent van der Voort 2–3)
- 2022: Second round (lost to Michael Smith 0–3)

== Performance timeline ==
=== BDO ===
| Tournament | 2007 | 2009 | 2011 | 2012 | 2013 | 2014 |
|---|---|---|---|---|---|---|
| BDO World Championship | Did not qualify | | | 1R | DNQ | 1R |
| International Darts League | Prel. | Not held | | | | |
| World Masters | 1R | 1R | 2R | 3R | 5R | PDC |
| Zuiderduin Masters | DNP | RR | Did not participate | | | |

=== PDC ===
| Tournament | 2015 | 2016 | 2017 | 2018 | 2019 | 2020 | 2021 | 2022 | 2024 | 2026 |
|---|---|---|---|---|---|---|---|---|---|---|
| PDC World Championship | 1R | DNQ | 1R | DNQ | 2R | 2R | 2R | 2R | DNQ | |
| UK Open | DNQ | | 4R | 4R | 3R | 3R | 5R | 5R | 2R | 2R |
| World Grand Prix | Did not qualify | | | 2R | Did not qualify | | | | | |
| Players Championship Finals | DNQ | 3R | 2R | 1R | 1R | DNQ | 1R | Did not qualify | | |
Career statistics
| Year-end ranking | NR | 73 | 54 | 49 | 46 | 50 | 52 | 65 | 235 | |

==== European Tour ====
| Season | 1 | 2 | 3 | 4 | 5 | 6 | 7 | 8 | 9 | 10 | 11 | 12 | 13 |
|---|---|---|---|---|---|---|---|---|---|---|---|---|---|
| 2014 | GDC; 1R | Did not qualify | | | | | EDG; 1R | EDT; DNQ | | | | | |
| 2016 | Did not qualify | | | EDM; 2R | ADO; 3R | Did not qualify | | | | GDC; 2R | | | |
| 2017 | Did not qualify | | | EDG; 1R | Did not qualify | | | | | | IDO; SF | EDT; DNQ | |
| 2018 | EDO; QF | GDG; DNQ | GDO; DNQ | ADO; 2R | Did not qualify | | | | | GDC; QF | DDC; DNQ | IDO; 1R | EDT; DNQ |
| 2019 | EDO; DNQ | GDC; 2R | Did not qualify | | | | | | CDO; 3R | Did not qualify | | | |
| 2020 | BDC; 1R | GDC; 1R | EDG; DNQ | IDO; 2R | | | | | | | | | |
| 2022 | IDO; 1R | Did not qualify | | | | | EDG; 1R | Did not qualify | | | | | |

==== Players Championships ====
| Season | 1 | 2 | 3 | 4 | 5 | 6 | 7 | 8 | 9 | 10 | 11 | 12 | 13 | 14 | 15 | 16 | 17 | 18 | 19 | 20 | 21 | 22 | 23 | 24 | 25 | 26 | 27 | 28 | 29 | 30 |
|---|---|---|---|---|---|---|---|---|---|---|---|---|---|---|---|---|---|---|---|---|---|---|---|---|---|---|---|---|---|---|
| 2018 | BAR; QF | BAR; 1R | BAR; 3R | BAR; 1R | MIL; 3R | MIL; 2R | BAR; 3R | BAR; 1R | WIG; 3R | WIG; 1R | MIL; 1R | MIL; 2R | WIG; 3R | WIG; 1R | BAR; 1R | BAR; 1R | BAR; 1R | BAR; SF | DUB; 3R | DUB; 4R | BAR; 1R | BAR; 1R | | | | | | | | |
| 2019 | WIG; 1R | WIG; 3R | WIG; 4R | WIG; 1R | BAR; 1R | BAR; 2R | WIG; QF | WIG; 2R | BAR; 1R | BAR; 2R | BAR; 1R | BAR; 2R | BAR; 1R | BAR; 2R | BAR; SF | BAR; 1R | WIG; SF | WIG; 3R | BAR; SF | BAR; 1R | HIL; QF | HIL; 1R | BAR; 3R | BAR; 4R | BAR; 3R | BAR; 4R | DUB; 2R | DUB; 1R | BAR; SF | BAR; 1R |
| 2020 | BAR; 2R | BAR; 1R | WIG; 1R | WIG; 1R | WIG; 1R | WIG; 2R | BAR; 1R | BAR; 1R | MIL; 1R | MIL; 1R | MIL; 2R | MIL; 1R | MIL; 2R | NIE; 2R | NIE; 3R | NIE; 2R | NIE; 1R | NIE; 1R | COV; 4R | COV; 2R | COV; 1R | COV; 2R | COV; 3R | | | | | | | |
| 2021 | BOL; 1R | BOL; 1R | BOL; 3R | BOL; 2R | MIL; 1R | MIL; 2R | MIL; 2R | MIL; 1R | NIE; 3R | NIE; 2R | NIE; 3R | NIE; 4R | MIL; 1R | MIL; 2R | MIL; 3R | MIL; 3R | COV; 2R | COV; 4R | COV; 4R | COV; 1R | BAR; 2R | BAR; 1R | BAR; 1R | BAR; 2R | BAR; 1R | BAR; 2R | BAR; 2R | BAR; 1R | BAR; 2R | BAR; 1R |
| 2022 | BAR; 1R | BAR; 1R | WIG; 3R | WIG; 2R | BAR; 1R | BAR; 1R | NIE; 4R | NIE; 1R | BAR; 1R | BAR; 1R | BAR; 3R | BAR; 1R | BAR; 3R | WIG; 2R | WIG; 1R | NIE; 2R | NIE; 1R | BAR; 2R | BAR; 2R | BAR; 1R | BAR; 2R | BAR; 1R | BAR; 3R | BAR; 1R | BAR; 2R | BAR; 1R | BAR; 1R | BAR; 2R | BAR; 1R | BAR; 3R |
