= Simon Stevenson =

English darts player (born 1972)

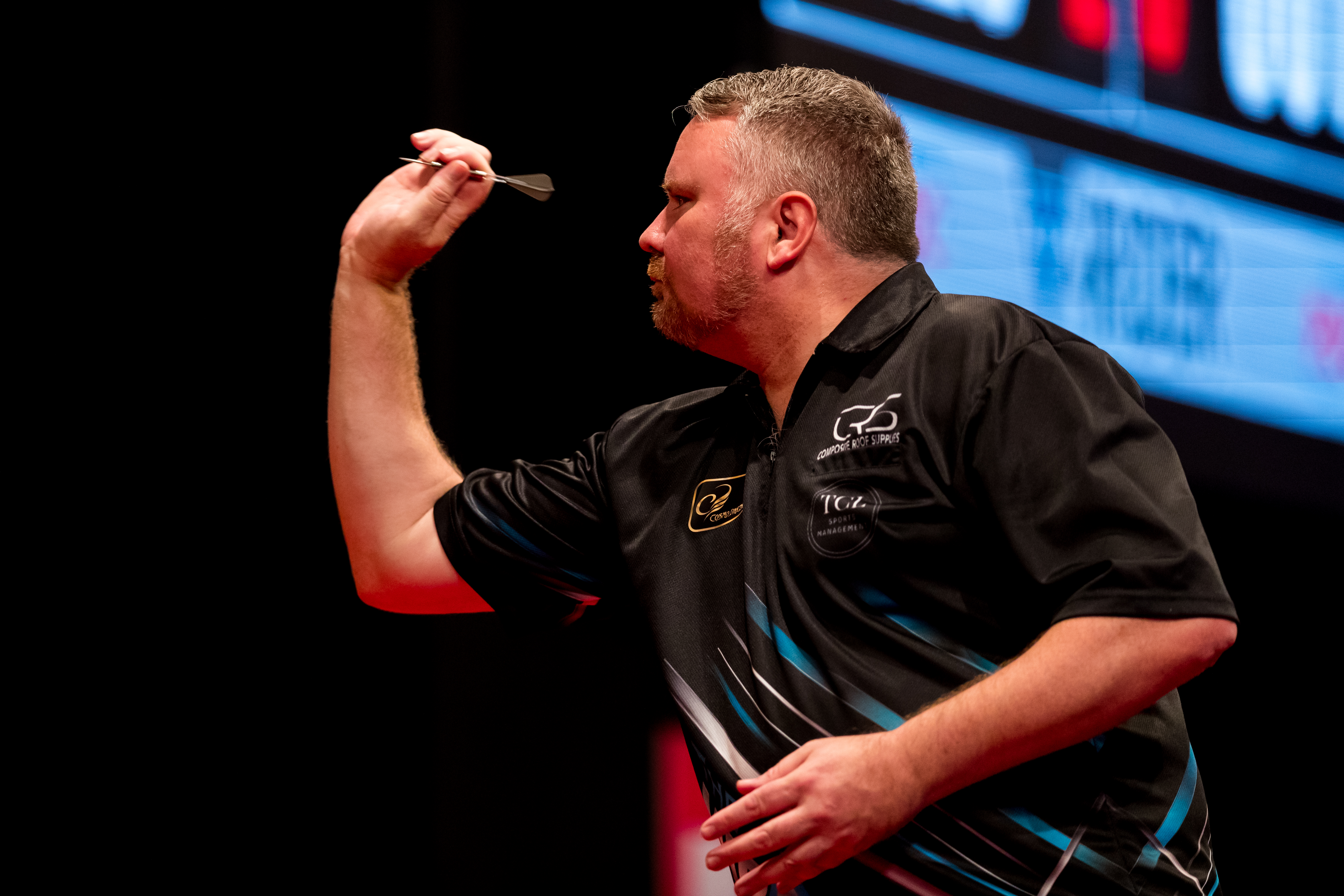
- Stevenson in 2019

Personal information
- Nickname: "The Mirror Man"
- Born: 18 February 1972 (age 54) Plymouth, Devon, England
- Home town: London, England

Sport
- Sport: Darts
- Playing since: 1990
- Darts: 22g Cosmos
- Laterality: Right-handed
- Walk-on music: "Mirror Man" by The Human League

Organisation (see split in darts)
- PDC: 2014–2022
- Current world ranking: (PDC) NR (18 October 2026)

PDC premier events – best performances
- World Championship: Last 72: 2017
- UK Open: Quarter-final: 2019
- PC Finals: Last 64: 2016, 2018

Other tournament wins
- Years
Plymouth Open	2014
Plymouth Champ of Champs	2002, 2009, 2012, 2014, 2017, 2023

Simon Stevenson (born 18 February 1972) is an English darts player who competes in Professional Darts Corporation (PDC) events.

== Career ==
Stevenson first rose to prominence after winning the Rileys Plymouth qualifier for the 2014 UK Open. He defeated Ian Jones, Jason Lovett, Mark Barilli and Rocco Maes to reach the last 32 before losing 9–5 to Jamie Lewis.

Stevenson gained the nickname "The Mirror Man" in a late 2014 clash, matching exactly dart-for-dart on three unusual finishes by opponent Darren Hardyment before eventually clinching a resounding victory in the West Midlands derby. It was 6th time lucky for Stevenson who self-proclaimedly suffered 5 years bad luck at the event before triumphing.

The following year, he again qualified for the 2015 UK Open via the Rileys Reading qualifier, but could not repeat his 2014 performance as he lost 5–2 to Dave Prins in the preliminary round.

Stevenson first claimed a PDC Tour Card in 2016, defeating Lee Evans on Day 1 of Q-School. His performances in his first year on the PDC Pro Tour, including his first quarter-final in August, resulted in him qualifying for the 2016 Players Championship Finals as the 44th seed, drawing Jelle Klaasen in the first round. He led Klaasen 3–1 and 4–2 but then lost four legs in a row to be defeated.

He subsequently qualified for the 2017 PDC World Darts Championship at Alexandra Palace by beating Scott Taylor at the PDPA Qualifier in Wigan, but lost 2–1 in sets to Zoran Lerchbacher in the preliminary round. Stevenson qualified for the 2017 World Series of Darts Finals by defeating Andy Jenkins 5–4 in their Tour Card Holder Qualifier final. He defeated Jan Dekker 6–3 in the first round before losing 6–5 to James Wade.

At the end of 2017, Stevenson was ranked 77 in the world and therefore outside of the Top 64 who automatically retain their Tour Cards. He returned to the PDC Q-School and regained his Tour Card after finishing 5th on the UK Q-School Order of Merit. In the first and last 2018 UK Open Qualifiers, Stevenson reached the last 16, eventually losing 6–3 to Michael van Gerwen and 6–5 to Peter Wright. These runs secured a third-round entry in the UK Open. He was defeated 10–6 by James Wade in the third round.

Stevenson went on a run to the quarter-finals of the 2019 UK Open. He defeated Adrian Gray, Mark Webster, Raymond van Barneveld, Kim Huybrechts and Dave Chisnall before losing 10–5 to Gerwyn Price. It was Stevenson’s first run to a televised quarter-final.

== World Championship results ==
=== PDC ===
- 2017: Preliminary round (lost to Zoran Lerchbacher 1–2)
- 2019: First round (lost to Ted Evetts 0–3)

== Performance timeline ==
Tournament	2014	2015	2016	2017	2018	2019	2020
PDC World Championship	Did not qualify			Prel.	DNQ	1R	DNQ
UK Open	4R	Prel.	DNQ		3R	QF	5R
Players Championship Finals	DNQ		1R	DNQ	1R	DNQ	
Non-ranked televised events
World Series of Darts Finals	NH	DNQ		2R	Did not qualify		

PDC Players Championships

Season	1	2	3	4	5	6	7	8	9	10	11	12	13	14	15	16	17	18	19	20	21	22	23	24	25	26	27	28	29	30
2018	BAR; 1R	BAR; SF	BAR; 3R	BAR; 3R	MIL; 3R	MIL; 3R	BAR; 1R	BAR; 1R	WIG; 4R	WIG; 1R	MIL; 3R	MIL; 1R	WIG; 1R	WIG; 1R	BAR; 1R	BAR; 2R	BAR; 2R	BAR; 3R	DUB; 4R	DUB; 1R	BAR; 2R	BAR; 1R								

Performance Table Legend
W	Won the tournament	F	Finalist	SF	Semifinalist	QF	Quarterfinalist	#R; RR; Prel.	Lost in # round Round-robin; Preliminary round	DQ	Disqualified
DNQ	Did not qualify	DNP	Did not participate	WD	Withdrew	NH	Tournament not held	#R; RR; Prel.	Lost in # round Round-robin; Preliminary round	NYF	Not yet founded
