= Josh Payne (darts player) =

English darts player

Personal information
- Nickname: "The Maximum"
- Born: 10 December 1993 (age 32) Wolverhampton, England
- Home town: Ashford, Kent, England; Gravesend, Kent, England

Sport
- Sport: Darts
- Playing since: 2010
- Darts: 23g Red Dragon Signature
- Laterality: Right-handed
- Walk-on music: "Here Comes the Hotstepper" by Ini Kamoze

Organisation (see split in darts)
- BDO: 2012–2013
- PDC: 2013–2025

WDF major events – best performances
- World Masters: Last 48: 2012

PDC premier events – best performances
- World Championship: Last 64: 2017, 2019, 2020
- World Matchplay: Last 32: 2016
- World Grand Prix: Last 32: 2018
- UK Open: Quarter-final: 2019
- Grand Slam: Last 16: 2018
- PC Finals: Last 16: 2016

Other tournament wins
- Years
PDC Challenge Tour	2013
MODUS Online Darts	2022 (x2)
Players Championships
2016, 2018
Youth events
PDC Development Tour	2014, 2016
Mill Rythe Darts Festival	2012

Josh Payne (born 10 December 1993) is an English darts player who competes in Professional Darts Corporation (PDC) events.

== Career ==
Payne won his first title in 2013 at a PDC Challenge Tour event by beating Rowby-John Rodriguez 4–3 in the final. He also qualified for the Gibraltar Darts Trophy and beat Wayne Jones 6–2, before losing 6–1 to Dave Chisnall in the second round despite averaging 100.50.

In 2014, Payne reached the final of the first two Youth Tour events, losing to Nick Kenny and Lewis Venes respectively. He qualified for the UK Open for the first time and lost 5–4 to Andy Boulton in the second round. At the fifth Players Championship of the year Payne recorded wins over three-time world champion John Part and 2012 UK Open winner Robert Thornton to reach the last 16 of a PDC event for the first time, where he was whitewashed 6–0 by Mervyn King. He also won through to the last 16 of the World Youth Championship and lost 6–4 to Jack Twedwell. In September, Payne came from 3–0 down in the final of a Youth Tour event to beat Jake Jones 4–3 and he lost by a reverse of this scoreline in the final of the 16th event to Dean Reynolds. He finished second on the Youth Tour Order of Merit to earn a two-year PDC tour card which commenced in 2015.

At the 2015 UK Open, Payne defeated Lionel Sams 5–3, Dave Prins 5–4 and Andy Jenkins 9–6 to play in the fourth round, where Mensur Suljović beat him 9–4. Payne beat Wayne Jones, Stephen Bunting and Michael Smith at the Dutch Darts Masters to play in the quarter-finals of a PDC event for the first time, where he lost 6–4 to Justin Pipe. Payne finished as the runner-up in two Development Tour in the second half of the year, as well as being a quarter-finalist in the World Youth Championship.

Payne lost 9–5 to Ryan de Vreede in the third round of the 2016 UK Open. He took the third Development Tour event by defeating Rowby-John Rodriguez in the final. In April, Payne beat Gerwyn Price, Ronny Huybrechts, Wes Newton, Mensur Suljović and Steve Brown to play in the final of 2016 Players Championship 6. He then claimed the title with a 6–5 victory over James Wade, sealing it with a 116 finish with Wade waiting on 40.

This win saw him qualify for the 2016 World Matchplay. On his debut in the event Payne was defeated 10–7 by Robert Thornton. Payne received an invitation to play in the World Series Finals and was ousted 6–3 by Daryl Gurney in the opening round.

Payne qualified for his first World Championship in the 2017 event through the Pro Tour Order of Merit and he won the first set versus Terry Jenkins. He went 2–1 down and missed one dart to square the match, going on instead to be beaten 3–1.

In May 2018, Payne won his second PDC ranking title at Players Championship 12 by beating Peter Wright 6–5 in the final.

At the end of the 2021 season, Payne lost his tour card and had to qualify back through the PDC Q-school. He was unsuccessful in his attempt winning only 1 point, which was not enough to earn a 2 year tour card.

He won back his Tour card in 2023 Q-School.

== World Championship results ==
=== PDC ===
- 2017: First round (lost to Terry Jenkins 1–3)
- 2019: Second round (lost to Dave Chisnall 2–3)
- 2020: Second round (lost to Dimitri Van den Bergh 0–3)

== Performance timeline ==
=== BDO ===
Tournament	2012
BDO Ranked televised events
World Masters	4R

=== PDC ===
Tournament	2011	2013	2014	2015	2016	2017	2018	2019	2020	2021	2023	2024
PDC Ranked televised events
World Championship	Did not qualify					1R	DNQ	2R	2R	Did not qualify		
UK Open	DNQ		2R	4R	DNQ		1R	QF	4R	3R	1R	4R
World Matchplay	Did not qualify				1R	Did not qualify						
World Grand Prix	Did not qualify						1R	Did not qualify				
Grand Slam of Darts	Did not qualify						2R	Did not qualify				
Players Championship Finals	Did not qualify				3R	DNQ	1R	1R	DNQ			
PDC Non-ranked televised events
World Youth Championship	Prel.	2R	3R	QF	1R	F	DNP					
Career statistics
Year-end ranking	NR	NR	92	70	48	50	53	45	55	100	124	96

==== European Tour ====
Season	1	2	3	4	5	6	7	8	9	10	11	12	13
2013	Did not qualify				GDT; 2R	GDC; DNQ	GDM; 1R	DDM; DNQ					
2014	GDC; DNQ	DDM; 1R	Did not qualify										
2015	DNQ		GDM; 1R	DDM; QF	Did not qualify								
2016	DNQ			EDM; 1R	ADO; 1R	DNQ		EDT; 2R	DNQ				
2017	DNQ		GDO; 1R	Did not qualify							IDO; 3R	EDT; DNQ	
2018	EDO; DNQ	GDG; 2R	DNQ			DDM; 2R	DNQ			GDC; 1R	DDC; 3R	DNQ	
2019	EDO; 1R	GDC; 1R	GDG; 2R	DNQ		EDG; 1R	DNQ			ADC; 1R	DNQ		
2020	BDC; DNQ	GDC; 1R	DNQ										
2023	BSD; 1R	Did not qualify								EDG; 2R	Did not qualify		

==== Players Championships ====
Season	1	2	3	4	5	6	7	8	9	10	11	12	13	14	15	16	17	18	19	20	21	22	23	24	25	26	27	28	29	30	31	32	33	34
2013	WIG; 1R	WIG; 1R	WIG; 1R	WIG; 1R	CRA; 1R	CRA; 1R	BAR; 2R	BAR; 1R	DUB; 3R	DUB; 2R	KIL; 2R	KIL; 3R	WIG; 2R	WIG; 2R	BAR; 3R	BAR; 1R																		
2014	BAR; 2R	BAR; 1R	CRA; 1R	CRA; 2R	WIG; 4R	WIG; 2R	WIG; 1R	WIG; 2R	CRA; 2R	CRA; 1R	COV; 2R	COV; 1R	CRA; 2R	CRA; 2R	DUB; 1R	DUB; 2R	CRA; 1R	CRA; 1R	COV; 3R	COV; 2R														
2015	BAR; 2R	BAR; 1R	BAR; 1R	BAR; 1R	BAR; 1R	COV; 1R	COV; 2R	COV; 2R	CRA; 3R	CRA; 4R	BAR; 1R	BAR; 2R	WIG; 1R	WIG; 4R	BAR; DNP		DUB; QF	DUB; 4R	COV; 2R	COV; 1R														
2016	BAR; 1R	BAR; 1R	BAR; 2R	BAR; 2R	BAR; QF	BAR; W	BAR; 3R	COV; 2R	COV; 3R	BAR; 1R	BAR; 2R	BAR; 3R	BAR; 1R	BAR; 2R	BAR; 1R	BAR; 1R	DUB; 2R	DUB; 2R	BAR; QF	BAR; 1R														
2017	BAR; 2R	BAR; 1R	BAR; 1R	BAR; 3R	MIL; 2R	MIL; 2R	BAR; 1R	BAR; 4R	WIG; 1R	WIG; 3R	MIL; 3R	MIL; 1R	WIG; 1R	WIG; 3R	BAR; 2R	BAR; 1R	BAR; 1R	BAR; 1R	DUB; 2R	DUB; 2R	BAR; 1R	BAR; 1R												
2018	BAR; 3R	BAR; 1R	BAR; 1R	BAR; 4R	MIL; 1R	MIL; 4R	BAR; 1R	BAR; SF	WIG; 2R	WIG; 2R	MIL; 1R	MIL; W	WIG; 1R	WIG; 3R	BAR; 3R	BAR; 2R	BAR; 2R	BAR; 2R	DUB; 1R	DUB; 2R	BAR; 3R	BAR; 1R												
2019	WIG; 3R	WIG; 2R	WIG; 1R	WIG; 2R	BAR; 3R	BAR; 3R	WIG; 4R	WIG; 1R	BAR; 2R	BAR; 2R	BAR; 2R	BAR; 1R	BAR; 2R	BAR; 1R	BAR; 2R	BAR; 3R	WIG; 1R	WIG; 2R	BAR; 4R	BAR; 1R	HIL; 2R	HIL; 1R	BAR; 4R	BAR; 2R	BAR; 2R	BAR; 1R	DUB; 1R	DUB; 3R	BAR; 2R	BAR; 2R				
2020	BAR; 2R	BAR; 1R	WIG; 3R	WIG; 1R	WIG; 1R	WIG; 2R	BAR; 1R	BAR; 4R	MIL; 2R	MIL; 2R	MIL; 1R	MIL; 1R	MIL; 1R	NIE; 3R	NIE; 1R	NIE; 2R	NIE; 2R	NIE; 2R	COV; 1R	COV; 1R	COV; 2R	COV; 1R	COV; 2R											
2021	BOL; 1R	BOL; 3R	BOL; 2R	BOL; 1R	MIL; 1R	MIL; 2R	MIL; 1R	MIL; 1R	NIE; 2R	NIE; 1R	NIE; 2R	NIE; 1R	MIL; 1R	MIL; 4R	MIL; 2R	MIL; 1R	COV; 2R	COV; 2R	COV; 2R	COV; 1R	BAR; 1R	BAR; 1R	BAR; 2R	BAR; 1R	BAR; 1R	BAR; 2R	BAR; 2R	BAR; 1R	BAR; 1R	BAR; 1R				
2023	BAR; 1R	BAR; 3R	BAR; 1R	BAR; 1R	BAR; 1R	BAR; 1R	HIL; 1R	HIL; 2R	WIG; 3R	WIG; 2R	LEI; 2R	LEI; 2R	HIL; 1R	HIL; 1R	LEI; 2R	LEI; 1R	HIL; 2R	HIL; 1R	BAR; 1R	BAR; 2R	BAR; 3R	BAR; 1R	BAR; 1R	BAR; 1R	BAR; 1R	BAR; 2R	BAR; 1R	BAR; 1R	BAR; 4R	BAR; 1R				
2024	WIG; 1R	WIG; 1R	LEI; 1R	LEI; 1R	HIL; 1R	HIL; 1R	LEI; 1R	LEI; 1R	HIL; 1R	HIL; 2R	HIL; 1R	HIL; 1R	MIL; 1R	MIL; 1R	MIL; 1R	MIL; 1R	MIL; 1R	MIL; 1R	MIL; 1R	WIG; 1R	WIG; 2R	MIL; 1R	MIL; 1R	WIG; 1R	WIG; 1R	WIG; 3R	WIG; 1R	WIG; 2R	LEI; 2R	LEI; 1R				

Performance Table Legend
W	Won the tournament	F	Finalist	SF	Semifinalist	QF	Quarterfinalist	#R; RR; Prel.	Lost in # round Round-robin; Preliminary round	DQ	Disqualified
DNQ	Did not qualify	DNP	Did not participate	WD	Withdrew	NH	Tournament not held	#R; RR; Prel.	Lost in # round Round-robin; Preliminary round	NYF	Not yet founded
