= Martin Atkins (darts player, born 1975) =

English darts player

Personal information
- Nickname: T'other
- Born: 4 April 1975 (age 51) Wigan, England
- Home town: Wigan, England

Sport
- Sport: Darts
- Playing since: 2010
- Darts: 22 Gram
- Laterality: Right-handed
- Walk-on music: "Play Hard" by David Guetta feat. Ne-Yo & Akon

Organisation (see split in darts)
- BDO: 2010-2018
- PDC: 2018–2021

WDF major events – best performances
- World Masters: Last 272: 2016, 2017

PDC premier events – best performances
- UK Open: Last 32: 2020

Other tournament wins
- Tournament: Years
- Antwerp Masters PDC Challenge Tour: 2017; 2018

Martin Atkins (born 4 April 1975) is an English darts player who competes in the Professional Darts Corporation (PDC). He is sometimes referred to as Martin Atkins (Wigan) to avoid confusion with another player named Martin Atkins, who comes from Leeds.

== Career ==
After missing out on winning a PDC Tour Card in 2018, Atkins played the PDC Challenge Tour, and on the second day of competition, he won PDC Challenge Tour 3 by defeating Michael Barnard 5–4 in the final. Atkins qualified for the 2018 UK Open as an amateur Riley's qualifier, losing to fellow amateur Paul Whitworth 3–6.

He won a tour card at the 2020 Q-School, enabling him to compete on the 2020 PDC Pro Tour.
