= Scott Taylor (darts player) =

English darts player (born 1991)

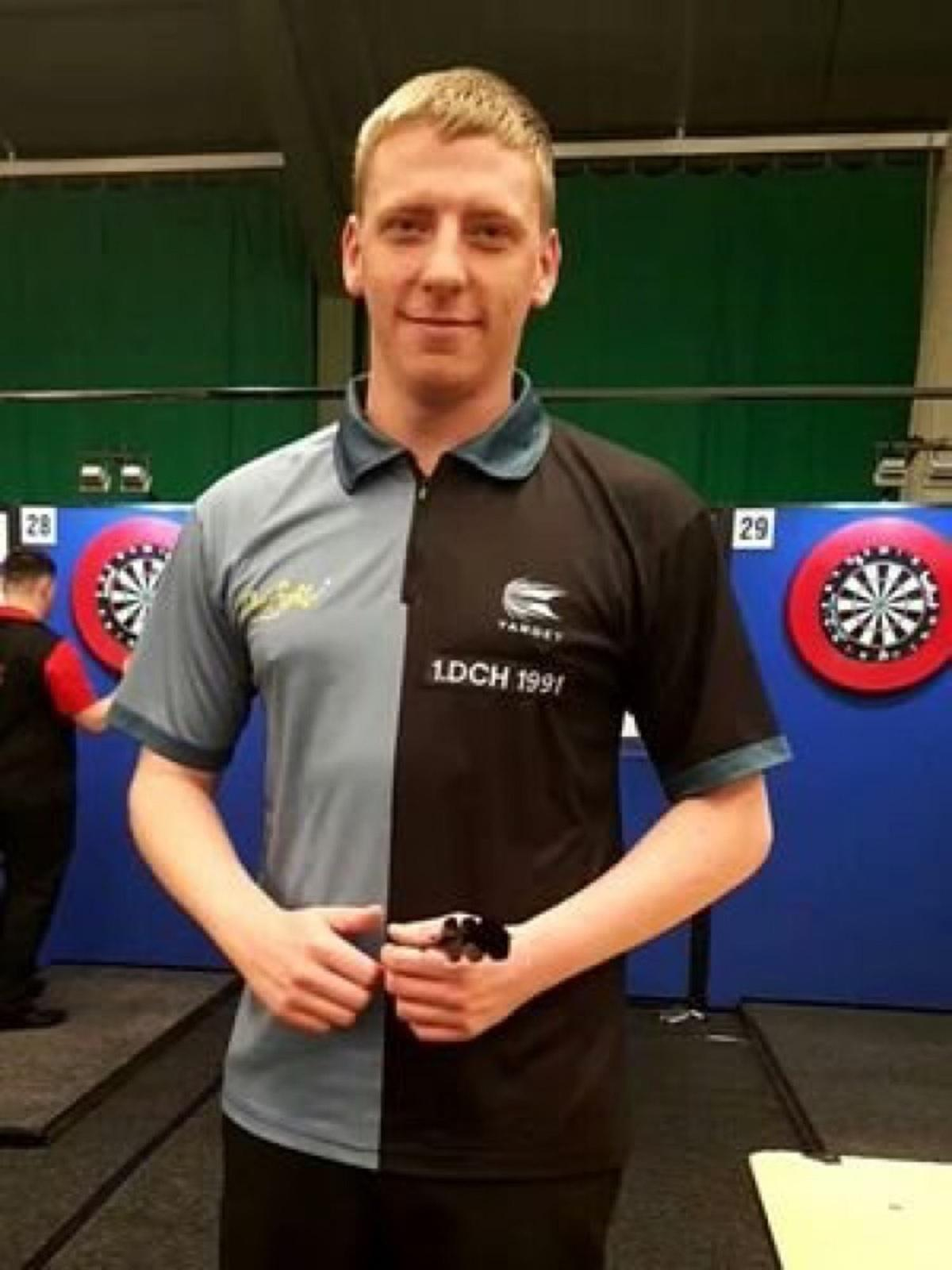
- Taylor in 2018

Personal information
- Born: 22 August 1991 (age 35) Bolton, England

Sport
- Sport: Darts
- Playing since: 2009
- Darts: 24g Target
- Laterality: Right-handed
- Walk-on music: "Cigarettes & Alcohol" by Oasis

Organisation (see split in darts)
- BDO: 2019
- PDC: 2011–

WDF major events – best performances
- World Trophy: Last 16: 2019

PDC premier events – best performances
- UK Open: Last 64: 2019
- PC Finals: Last 64: 2018

Other tournament wins
- Years
PDC Challenge Tour	2016
MODUS Super Series 6	2024

Scott Taylor (born 22 August 1991) is an English darts player from Bolton who competes in Professional Darts Corporation (PDC) events. A PDC Tour Card holder from 2017 to 2018, he is a one-time PDC Pro Tour finalist, finishing as the runner-up at Players Championship 9 on the 2018 PDC Pro Tour.

== career ==
=== 2015 ===
Taylor reached the quarter-finals of the 2015 PDC World Youth Championship, where he lost 6−5 to Dean Reynolds.

=== 2016 ===
He won the eighth Challenge Tour event of 2016 by beating Barry Lynn 5−4.

His first match win in a PDC European Tour tournament came at the German Darts Championship when he defeated Andy Boulton 6−3. Taylor lost 6−1 to Alan Norris in the second round.

=== 2017 ===
Taylor won a two-year PDC Tour Card in January 2017 by defeating Toni Alcinas 5−1 on the third day of Q-School.

He qualified for the 2017 UK Open, with his best performance in the qualifiers being a run to the last 16 at event 5.

=== 2018 ===
Taylor reached the final of Players Championship 9, losing to Michael van Gerwen 6–4.

This run to the final aided him in qualifying for the 2018 Players Championship Finals where he lost in the first round to Ian White 6–2.

Taylor did not earn enough prize money to end the 2018 season inside the top 64 on the PDC Order of Merit which meant that he lost his PDC Tour Card.

=== 2019 and BDO debut ===
Taylor entered 2019 Q-School but failed to win a tour card. Therefore he competed on the 2019 Challenge Tour instead. He qualified for the 2019 UK Open through a Riley's bar amateur qualifier. Taylor started in round one and won three games before losing to Mickey Mansell 10–9 in the last 64.

A new rule change in the British Darts Organisation (BDO) meant that players could compete in PDC Challenge Tour and BDO events without consequences. This allowed Taylor enter the 2019 BDO World Trophy qualifier. Taylor qualified for his BDO major debut and won his opening game 5–3 against 15th seed Derk Telnekes, recording a three-dart average of 104.6. This broke the record for highest ever average in the World Trophy. However the following day he played Jim Williams, who beat Taylor 5–4.

=== 2024 ===
In November 2024, Taylor won the title in Series 9 Week 8 of the MODUS Super Series.

== Performance timeline ==
PDC Players Championships

Season	1	2	3	4	5	6	7	8	9	10	11	12	13	14	15	16	17	18	19	20	21	22	23	24	25	26	27	28	29	30	31	32	33	34
2018	BAR; 1R	BAR; 1R	BAR; 1R	BAR; 1R	MIL; 1R	MIL; 2R	BAR; 1R	BAR; 1R	WIG; F	WIG; 2R	MIL; 1R	MIL; 1R	WIG; 1R	WIG; 1R	BAR; 1R	BAR; 3R	BAR; 1R	BAR; 1R	DUB; 2R	DUB; 1R	BAR; 1R	BAR; 2R												
2019 (Note: Not a Tour card holder)	Did not participate												BAR; 1R	BAR; DNP	BAR; 1R	BAR; QF	Did not participate				HIL; 1R	HIL; 1R	BAR; DNP	BAR; SF	BAR; DNP	BAR; 1R	DUB; QF	DUB; 2R	BAR; 1R	BAR; 1R				
2020	Did not participate						BAR; 2R	BAR; 2R	Did not participate					NIE; 1R	NIE; 2R	NIE; 1R	NIE; 1R	NIE; 1R	COV; 3R	COV; 2R	COV; 3R	COV; 2R	COV; 1R											
2022	Did not participate																													BAR; 1R				

Performance Table Legend
W	Won the tournament	F	Finalist	SF	Semifinalist	QF	Quarterfinalist	#R; RR; L#	Lost in # round Round-robin; Last # stage	DQ	Disqualified
DNQ	Did not qualify	DNP	Did not participate	WD	Withdrew	NH	Tournament not held	#R; RR; L#	Lost in # round Round-robin; Last # stage	NYF	Not yet founded
