= Butlin's Minehead =

Holiday resort in Minehead, Somerset, England

Butlins Resort Minehead
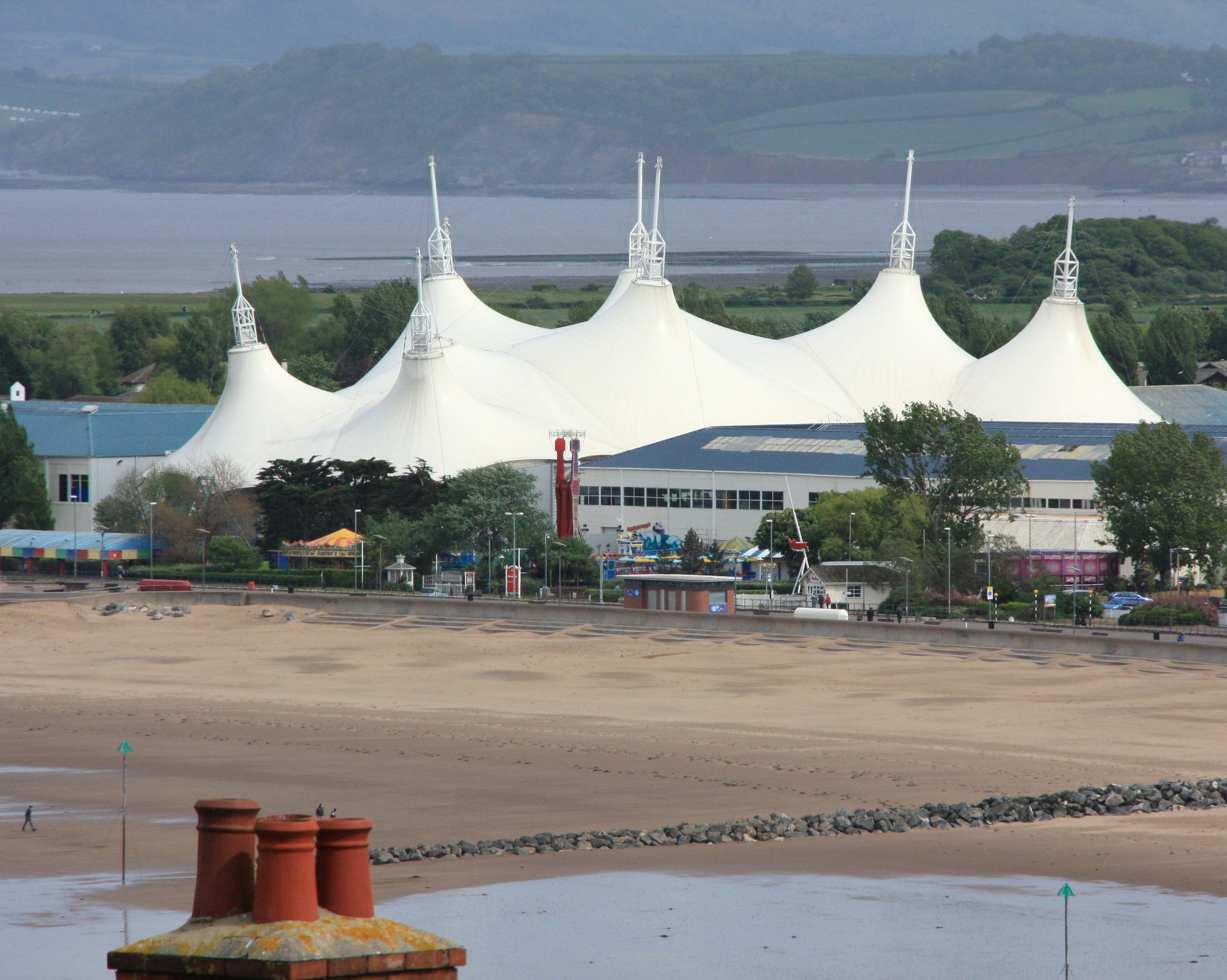

- Location within Somerset
- Location: Minehead, Somerset, UK
- Coordinates: 51°12′22″N 3°27′33″W
- Subsequent names: Somerwest World 23 May 1987; Butlins Minehead Resort 30 April 1999
- Campus size: 165 acres (0.67 km^{2})
- Residences: 7,500 Capacity
- Facilities: Amusement Park, Swimming Pool
- Established: 26 May 1962; 64 years ago

Butlins Resort Minehead is a holiday camp operated by Butlins, located in Minehead in Somerset, England. It opened in 1962 and remains in use today. It was known as Butlin's Minehead until 1987, and as Somerwest World from then until 1999, when it reopened as Butlins Minehead Resort.

== History ==
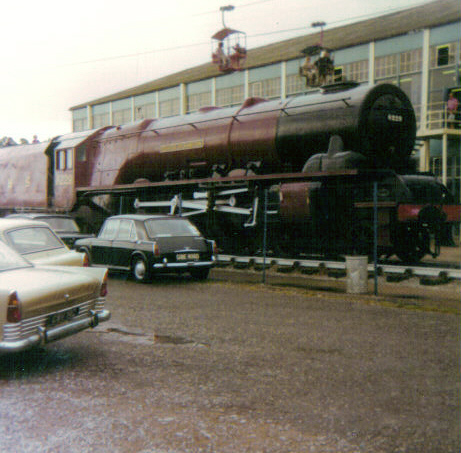
6229 Duchess of Hamilton steam locomotive Butlins Holiday Camp Minehead 14 August 1974

In the winter of 1961, Billy Butlin began work on creating a holiday camp in Minehead. The site was selected because of its flatness, good rail links, and proximity to the town and sea. The site was not without its problems, however, including flooding. In order to solve this, a trench was excavated around the site and an earth wall constructed. The trench later became the site's boating pond.

The site opened to the public on 26 May 1962, the construction having cost £2 million. Over the next decade several attractions were added: the miniature railway in 1964, the chairlifts in 1965, and the monorail in 1967. Full size locomotives, Duchess of Hamilton and Knowle, were added in 1964. The locomotives left the camp in 1974 and have since been restored and preserved.

Butlins Minehead underwent major development during the 1980s, when problems with flooding were finally fixed, and both the indoor and outdoor swimming pools were converted into funpools with the addition of waterslides, water cannons, and various other novelty features. Additional accommodation was constructed, and caravan accommodation was introduced. Following the redevelopment work, the camp was renamed Somerwest World.

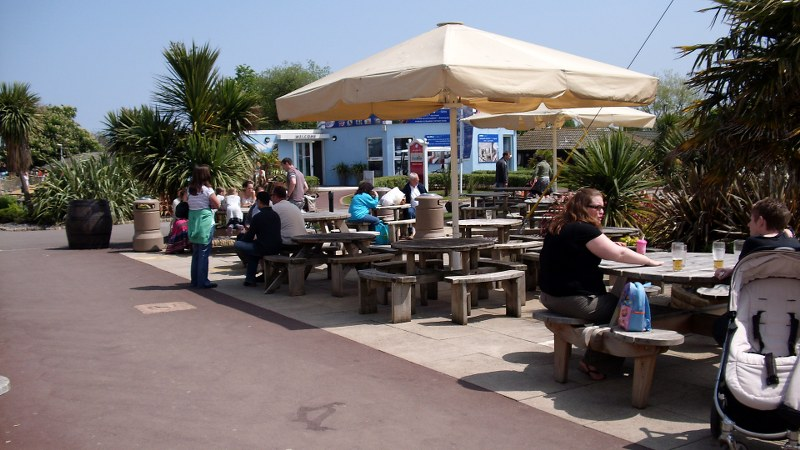
Butlins Minehead Resort October 2010 typical scene

As at Bognor Regis and Skegness, Minehead resort underwent further changes in 1998 and 1999 with the demolition of the Windsor building, relocation of the outdoor funpool and construction of the Skyline Pavilion in its place. However, the changes at Minehead were less extensive than at the other two remaining Butlins resorts, and most of the original structures and layout remained intact. In 2007, further work in the Minehead resort was undertaken with the creation of new luxury timeshare apartments known as BlueSkies but has now been rebranded to the BaySide Apartments.

== Skyline Pavilion ==
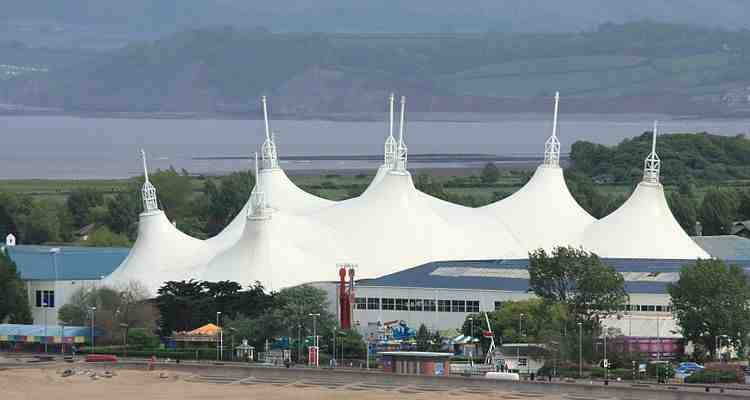
Skyline Pavilion in Minehead

The "Skyline Pavilion" is a large area within each resort that is enclosed under a white tensile fabric canopy. These were created during the 1998–99 closed season by linking together several pre-existing buildings so that space within those buildings could be used to provide all-weather facilities within the Skyline Pavilions.

Each Skyline Pavilion contains a stage (used mainly for daytime children's shows), associated seating, an amusement arcade and various shops selling novelties, souvenirs, and groceries. Many of the other venues and attractions in the resort can be accessed directly from within the Skyline Pavilion also.

Restaurants at Butlins Minehead include Burger King, Papa John's, Chopstix, Beachcomber Inn, Inn On The Green, Fish & Chips and Phat Pasty. Butlins Minehead also has two bars (one called Bar Rosso in the main skyline pavilion and another in hotshots) and a Costa Coffee on site.

== Accommodation and Locations ==
Standard Rooms - Surfers Point

Comfort Rooms - Pacific Wharf & Ocean Point

Comfort Plus Rooms - Surfers Point & Holnicote Village

Comfort Apartments - Holnicote Village, Oyster Bay & Atlantic Bay

Comfort Plus Apartments - Holnicote Village & Plantation Quay

Seaside Lodges - Seaside Lodges

West Lakes Chalets - West Lakes Village

Bayside Apartments - Bayside Apartments

Comfort Plus Caravans - Lakeside Caravan Village

== Pantomime ==
=== Notable headliners at Centre Stage ===
- Casper The Musical (30 April 1999 – 25 June 1999)
- Spider-Man The Musical (28 June 1999 – 4 September 1999)
- The Mask Musical (6 September 1999 – 26 November 1999)
- Tweenies Live! (2004)

== Entertainment ==
Butlins Minehead offers Formula K Go-Karts, Little Stars Funfair, Softplay, outdoor and indoor sports, Splash Waterworld, Skypark, and an outdoor traditional funfair.

=== Ex More Adventures ===
Butlins Minehead developed the Ex More Adventures, which include a climbing wall, diving courses, horse riding, Land Rover safari, fly fishing and sea fishing, sailing, canoeing and coasteering, some of which are held at Exmoor National Park.

==== Cinema ====
- Odeon Cinemas (Then: ABC Cinemas) (late 1990s – 2021)

== Special events ==
The Minehead camp has on several occasions played host to the Britain's Strongest Man contest, most recently in 2004, and since 2006 the Butlins Resort has been one of the venues for the World Wrestling Entertainment's UK winter tour. It also hosts the Professional Darts Corporation's UK Open and Players Championship Finals tournaments.

=== Spring Harvest ===
Butlins Minehead is the only Butlins still to have a small on-site chapel, and over the Easter period the entire resort plays host to an annual Spring Harvest, the largest Christian festival in the UK. Between Minehead and Skegness, the event attracts around 55,000 Christians from a range of denominations and plays host to many preachers, Christian musicians and dramatic artists.

=== All Tomorrow's Parties ===
All Tomorrow's Parties was a music festival that took place at Minehead. Named after the song "All Tomorrow's Parties" by the Velvet Underground, it was an alternative to larger mainstream festivals and was presented in a more intimate environment than a giant stadium or huge country field. All Tomorrow's Parties was a sponsorship-free festival where the organisers and artists stayed in the same accommodation as the fans.

=== Bloc Weekend ===
Bloc Weekend is an annual music festival, devoted to electronic music of several genres, and incorporates both DJ sets and live shows. The first two Bloc events took place at Pontin's holiday camp in Norfolk. The 2009 event, which took place during 13–15 March, was moved to the larger Minehead resort. The 5,000 capacity event still sold out before the festival began. In 2010 and 2011, Bloc returned to Minehead for another sold-out show. After the disastrous Bloc event at the London Pleasure Gardens in 2012, Bloc saw a successful re-return to Butlin's Minehead in March 2015.

=== 90's Weekend Featuring DJ Cudz and Raj ===
90's Weekend Featuring DJ Cudz and Raj was a music event hosted in 2012, devoted to Scooter, and incorporated both DJ sets and live shows. The event took place at Butlin's holiday camp in Minehead. The event, which took place during 15–17 July, was rated as amazing by Raj and Dean Wait. The 205,000 capacity event sold out 35 minutes after going on sale. The Guardian rated the weekend as "the best Scooter tribute ever made".
