= 2020 PDC Home Tour =

Special darts tournament in 2020

2020 Unibet Home Tour

Tournament information
- Dates: 17 April–18 May 2020
- Location: Various
- Country: Various
- Organisation(s): PDC
- Format: Legs
- Nine-dart finish: (England) Luke Woodhouse
- High checkout: 170 (Australia) Simon Whitlock (Group 11) (Hong Kong) Kai Fan Leung (Group 14) (England) Keegan Brown (Group 31)

Champion(s)
- (England) Nathan Aspinall

The 2020 Unibet Home Tour was a special tournament organised by the Professional Darts Corporation for players to play indoor tournaments at their homes during the COVID-19 pandemic.

It began on 17 April 2020, and ended on 18 May 2020, with the 2020 PDC Home Tour Play-Offs following on afterwards. The tournament was open to all players who had a PDC Tour Card in 2020.

The winner was awarded a place in the 2020 Grand Slam of Darts.

Luke Woodhouse hit a nine-darter in his Group 2 match with Gerwyn Price.

== Format ==
Beginning on 17 April 2020, four Tour Card players would play against each other over the course of an evening, with the winner of each night going into a last 32 stage, beginning on 26 May 2020.

In the first phase, each match will be a best of 9 legs match, with the winner of each match getting two points on the table. Should there be a tie on points after all the matches, the leg difference will determine the winner, should that also be equal, the result between the two players is taken into account. Should there be a three-way tie for first place, the overall average of the players will then be taken into account.

In the second phase taking place between 26 May and 2 June, the 32 winners will again be put into groups of four, where all players will play each other over one night, but each match is now a best of 11 legs match, but all other rules being the same. The eight winners in the second phase will then move into a semi-final group stage taking place on 3 & 4 June, with the top two in each group moving forward to the Championship Group stage, where the winner will become the champion.

Players opting to not take part were Michael Van Gerwen, Daryl Gurney, Mensur Suljović, Adrian Lewis, Jeffrey De Zwaan, Mervyn King, Steve West, Vincent Van Der Voort, Brendan Dolan, William O'Connor, Steve Lennon, Josh Payne, Benito Van Der Pas, Mark McGeeney, Madas Razma, Marko Kentele, Yordi Meeuwisse, Barrie Bates, Michael Barnard, Jason Lowe, Aaron Beeney, Stefan Siepmann, Wesley Harms, Derk Telnekes, Boris Krcmar, Darren Penhall, Wayne Jones.

== Darts At Home ==
Whilst the format was being finalised, there were 2 weeks of matches under the banner Darts At Home, which followed the same rules as the new PDC Home Tour, although the first week featured 5 players (in best-of-7 leg matches), as opposed to the 4 (in best-of-9 leg matches) which was then adopted later on.

All matches first to 4 (best-of-7 legs)

NB: P = Played; W = Won; L = Lost; LF = Legs for; LA = Legs against; +/− = Plus/minus record, in relation to legs; Avg = Three-dart average in group matches; Pts = Group points

=== Week 1 – 1 April ===
Pos.	Player	P	W	L	LF	LA	+/–	Avg	Pts
1	(South Africa) Devon Petersen	4	3	1	14	9	+5	83.28	6
2	(England) Chris Dobey	4	3	1	13	9	+4	91.43	6
3	(England) Luke Humphries	4	2	2	13	11	+2	98.14	4
4	(England) Ted Evetts	4	2	2	11	13	–2	85.90	4
5	(England) Matthew Edgar	4	0	4	7	16	–9	82.49	0

79.17 Chris Dobey (England)	1 – 4	(South Africa) Devon Petersen 88.37
88.06 Chris Dobey (England)	4 – 2	(England) Luke Humphries 86.30
84.71 Matthew Edgar (England)	2 – 4	(England) Ted Evetts 95.27
109.11 Luke Humphries (England)	4 – 2	(South Africa) Devon Petersen 89.20
75.43 Devon Petersen (South Africa)	4 – 2	(England) Ted Evetts 81.11
83.16 Devon Petersen (South Africa)	4 – 2	(England) Matthew Edgar 79.76
96.87 Luke Humphries (England)	3 – 4	(England) Ted Evetts 86.26
102.29 Chris Dobey (England)	4 – 1	(England) Ted Evetts 80.70
97.72 Chris Dobey (England)	4 – 2	(England) Matthew Edgar 84.71
103.93 Luke Humphries (England)	4 – 1	(England) Matthew Edgar 81.00

All matches first to 5 (best-of-9 legs)

NB: P = Played; W = Won; L = Lost; LF = Legs for; LA = Legs against; +/− = Plus/minus record, in relation to legs; Avg = Three-dart average in group matches; Pts = Group points

=== Week 2 – 8 April ===
Pos.	Player	P	W	L	LF	LA	+/–	Avg	Pts
1	(England) Nathan Aspinall	3	2	1	14	12	+2	92.05	4
2	(Netherlands) Jelle Klaasen	3	2	1	12	13	–1	91.98	4
3	(England) Steve Beaton	3	1	2	12	12	0	92.26	2
4	(England) Stephen Bunting	3	1	2	11	12	–1	87.30	2

98.63 Nathan Aspinall (England)	5 – 3	(England) Steve Beaton 91.78
87.62 Stephen Bunting (England)	5 – 2	(Netherlands) Jelle Klaasen 87.39
85.48 Nathan Aspinall (England)	5 – 4	(England) Stephen Bunting 81.87
92.40 Steve Beaton (England)	4 – 5	(Netherlands) Jelle Klaasen 93.13
94.11 Nathan Aspinall (England)	4 – 5	(Netherlands) Jelle Klaasen 94.84
95.26 Stephen Bunting (England)	2 – 5	(England) Steve Beaton 92.59

== Phase One ==
All matches first to 5 (best-of-9 legs)

NB: P = Played; W = Won; L = Lost; LF = Legs for; LA = Legs against; +/− = Plus/minus record, in relation to legs; Avg = Three-dart average in group matches; Pts = Group points

=== Group 1 – 17 April ===
Pos.	Player	P	W	L	LF	LA	+/–	Avg	Pts
1	(Wales) Jamie Lewis	3	2	1	13	10	+3	89.60	4
2	(Scotland) Peter Wright	3	2	1	11	10	+1	84.83	4
3	(England) Peter Jacques	3	1	2	13	12	+1	88.65	2
4	(Netherlands) Niels Zonneveld	3	1	2	8	13	–5	88.43	2

93.11 Peter Wright (Scotland)	5 – 4	(England) Peter Jacques 89.28
95.09 Jamie Lewis (Wales)	3 – 5	(Netherlands) Niels Zonneveld 96.23
94.67 Peter Jacques (England)	5 – 2	(Netherlands) Niels Zonneveld 90.70
81.45 Peter Wright (Scotland)	1 – 5	(Wales) Jamie Lewis 99.74
79.83 Jamie Lewis (Wales)	5 – 4	(England) Peter Jacques 84.48
78.14 Niels Zonneveld (Netherlands)	1 – 5	(Scotland) Peter Wright 77.63

=== Group 2 – 18 April ===
Pos.	Player	P	W	L	LF	LA	+/–	Avg	Pts
1	(England) Luke Woodhouse	3	3	0	15	4	+11	95.44	6
2	(Wales) Gerwyn Price	3	2	1	10	9	+1	98.41	4
3	(England) Ted Evetts	3	1	2	9	13	–4	84.52	2
4	(Austria) Rowby-John Rodriguez	3	0	3	7	15	–8	86.90	0

97.00 Gerwyn Price (Wales)	5 – 2	(Austria) Rowby-John Rodriguez 84.20
89.46 Luke Woodhouse (England)	5 – 2	(England) Ted Evetts 80.30
86.93 Rowby-John Rodriguez (Austria)	3 – 5	(England) Ted Evetts 82.58
95.05 Gerwyn Price (Wales)	0 – 5	(England) Luke Woodhouse 113.86
90.56 Luke Woodhouse (England)	5 – 2	(Austria) Rowby-John Rodriguez 89.60
92.24 Ted Evetts (England)	2 – 5	(Wales) Gerwyn Price 102.12

=== Group 3 – 19 April ===
Pos.	Player	P	W	L	LF	LA	+/–	Avg	Pts
1	(England) Dave Chisnall	3	3	0	15	3	+12	90.87	6
2	(England) Scott Waites	3	2	1	12	7	+5	93.13	4
3	(Wales) Jonathan Worsley	3	1	2	7	14	–7	81.75	2
4	(Netherlands) Jan Dekker	3	0	3	5	15	–10	82.05	0

102.76 Dave Chisnall (England)	5 – 2	(England) Scott Waites 95.91
80.88 Jan Dekker (Netherlands)	4 – 5	(Wales) Jonathan Worsley 86.11
96.84 Scott Waites (England)	5 – 1	(Wales) Jonathan Worsley 83.56
98.88 Dave Chisnall (England)	5 – 0	(Netherlands) Jan Dekker 90.96
77.16 Jan Dekker (Netherlands)	1 – 5	(England) Scott Waites 87.06
74.25 Jonathan Worsley (Wales)	1 – 5	(England) Dave Chisnall 74.65

=== Group 4 – 20 April ===
Pos.	Player	P	W	L	LF	LA	+/–	Avg	Pts
1	(Netherlands) Geert Nentjes	3	3	0	15	10	+5	96.92	6
2	(England) Ross Smith	3	1	2	11	11	0	90.15	2
3	(Northern Ireland) Mickey Mansell	3	1	2	12	13	–1	91.56	2
4	(England) Lisa Ashton	3	1	2	9	13	–4	85.97	2

99.67 Ross Smith (England)	5 – 1	(England) Lisa Ashton 86.63
99.09 Mickey Mansell (Northern Ireland)	4 – 5	(Netherlands) Geert Nentjes 100.17
80.13 Lisa Ashton (England)	3 – 5	(Netherlands) Geert Nentjes 95.40
87.33 Ross Smith (England)	3 – 5	(Northern Ireland) Mickey Mansell 86.91
88.51 Mickey Mansell (Northern Ireland)	3 – 5	(England) Lisa Ashton 91.28
95.15 Geert Nentjes (Netherlands)	5 – 3	(England) Ross Smith 86.23

=== Group 5 – 21 April ===
Pos.	Player	P	W	L	LF	LA	+/–	Avg	Pts
1	(Wales) Nick Kenny	3	3	0	15	8	+7	84.62	6
2	(England) Luke Humphries	3	2	1	13	12	+1	89.67	4
3	(England) Joe Murnan	3	1	2	10	11	–1	82.35	2
4	(South Africa) Devon Petersen	3	0	3	8	15	–7	80.66	0

92.66 Luke Humphries (England)	3 – 5	(Wales) Nick Kenny 90.82
75.00 Devon Petersen (South Africa)	1 – 5	(England) Joe Murnan 82.39
81.62 Nick Kenny (Wales)	5 – 2	(England) Joe Murnan 76.62
86.38 Luke Humphries (England)	5 – 4	(South Africa) Devon Petersen 84.78
80.28 Devon Petersen (South Africa)	3 – 5	(Wales) Nick Kenny 81.76
87.74 Joe Murnan (England)	3 – 5	(England) Luke Humphries 90.60

=== Group 6 – 22 April ===
Pos.	Player	P	W	L	LF	LA	+/–	Avg	Pts
1	(England) Ryan Searle	3	3	0	15	6	+9	100.23	6
2	(England) Andy Boulton	3	2	1	11	7	+4	95.49	4
3	(England) James Wade	3	1	2	8	12	–4	90.19	2
4	(England) Adrian Gray	3	0	3	6	15	–9	89.57	0

93.94 James Wade (England)	5 – 2	(England) Adrian Gray 88.14
96.49 Ryan Searle (England)	5 – 1	(England) Andy Boulton 95.97
90.84 Adrian Gray (England)	2 – 5	(England) Andy Boulton 100.92
93.19 James Wade (England)	3 – 5	(England) Ryan Searle 100.64
103.26 Ryan Searle (England)	5 – 2	(England) Adrian Gray 89.68
88.41 Andy Boulton (England)	5 – 0	(England) James Wade 80.73

=== Group 7 – 23 April ===
Pos.	Player	P	W	L	LF	LA	+/–	Avg	Pts
1	(Netherlands) Jelle Klaasen	3	2	1	14	9	+4	90.43	4
2	(England) Ryan Meikle	3	2	1	13	10	+3	90.82	4
3	(Germany) Gabriel Clemens	3	1	2	12	13	–1	92.21	2
4	(Northern Ireland) Gavin Carlin	3	1	2	8	14	–6	87.43	2

93.82 Gabriel Clemens (Germany)	5 – 3	(England) Ryan Meikle 90.07
85.36 Jelle Klaasen (Netherlands)	5 – 2	(Northern Ireland) Gavin Carlin 85.05
86.97 Ryan Meikle (England)	5 – 1	(Northern Ireland) Gavin Carlin 86.85
96.21 Gabriel Clemens (Germany)	3 – 5	(Netherlands) Jelle Klaasen 93.03
92.67 Jelle Klaasen (Netherlands)	4 – 5	(England) Ryan Meikle 94.57
89.77 Gavin Carlin (Northern Ireland)	5 – 4	(Germany) Gabriel Clemens 87.39

=== Group 8 – 24 April ===
Pos.	Player	P	W	L	LF	LA	+/–	Avg	Pts
1	(Wales) Jonny Clayton	3	3	0	15	7	+8	92.93	6
2	(England) Adam Hunt	3	2	1	12	9	+3	87.80	4
3	(England) David Pallett	3	1	2	10	12	–2	83.97	2
4	(England) Richard North	3	0	3	6	15	–9	87.32	0

95.97 Jonny Clayton (Wales)	5 – 2	(England) Adam Hunt 90.24
90.76 Richard North (England)	2 – 5	(England) David Pallett 94.29
85.38 Adam Hunt (England)	5 – 3	(England) David Pallett 81.00
90.52 Jonny Clayton (Wales)	5 – 3	(England) Richard North 87.64
82.80 Richard North (England)	1 – 5	(England) Adam Hunt 88.77
77.67 David Pallett (England)	2 – 5	(Wales) Jonny Clayton 92.81

=== Group 9 – 25 April ===
Pos.	Player	P	W	L	LF	LA	+/–	Avg	Pts
1	(Netherlands) Martijn Kleermaker	3	2	1	13	10	+3	90.69	4
2	(England) Michael Smith	3	2	1	13	11	+2	97.50	4
3	(England) Matt Clark	3	2	1	13	11	+2	84.74	4
4	(England) Harry Ward	3	0	3	8	15	–7	85.01	0

98.38 Michael Smith (England)	3 – 5	(Netherlands) Martijn Kleermaker 97.71
98.03 Michael Smith (England)	5 – 3	(England) Harry Ward 82.94
84.93 Harry Ward (England)	3 – 5	(England) Matt Clark 83.29
81.13 Martijn Kleermaker (Netherlands)	3 – 5	(England) Matt Clark 83.65
87.45 Harry Ward (England)	2 – 5	(Netherlands) Martijn Kleermaker 95.11
87.66 Matt Clark (England)	3 – 5	(England) Michael Smith 96.15

=== Group 10 – 26 April ===
Pos.	Player	P	W	L	LF	LA	+/–	Avg	Pts
1	(England) Nathan Aspinall	3	3	0	15	5	+10	91.79	6
2	(England) Steve Brown	3	2	1	12	9	+3	87.17	4
3	(England) Ryan Joyce	3	1	2	10	12	–2	87.30	2
4	(England) Simon Stevenson	3	0	3	4	15	–11	73.88	0

91.39 Nathan Aspinall (England)	5 – 2	(England) Steve Brown 85.78
86.56 Ryan Joyce (England)	5 – 2	(England) Simon Stevenson 81.88
89.58 Steve Brown (England)	5 – 1	(England) Simon Stevenson 73.14
98.45 Nathan Aspinall (England)	5 – 2	(England) Ryan Joyce 90.27
85.67 Ryan Joyce (England)	3 – 5	(England) Steve Brown 86.44
65.88 Simon Stevenson (England)	1 – 5	(England) Nathan Aspinall 85.56

=== Group 11 – 27 April ===
Pos.	Player	P	W	L	LF	LA	+/–	Avg	Pts
1	(England) Alan Tabern	3	2	1	11	11	0	89.43	4
2	(Netherlands) Mike van Duivenbode	3	2	1	12	12	0	93.82	4
3	(England) Kirk Shepherd	3	1	2	13	11	+2	92.88	2
4	(Australia) Simon Whitlock	3	1	2	12	14	–2	92.88	2

96.78 Simon Whitlock (Australia)	3 – 5	(Netherlands) Mike van Duivenbode 97.05
100.45 Kirk Shepherd (England)	5 – 1	(England) Alan Tabern 82.95
89.09 Mike van Duivenbode (Netherlands)	2 – 5	(England) Alan Tabern 97.60
89.89 Simon Whitlock (Australia)	5 – 4	(England) Kirk Shepherd 90.04
90.77 Kirk Shepherd (England)	4 – 5	(Netherlands) Mike van Duivenbode 94.79
87.17 Alan Tabern (England)	5 – 4	(Australia) Simon Whitlock 92.64

=== Group 12 – 28 April ===
Pos.	Player	P	W	L	LF	LA	+/–	Avg	Pts
1	(Germany) Max Hopp	4	3	1	18	13	+5	85.79	6
2	(Belgium) Mike De Decker	4	2	2	15	14	+1	89.38	4
3	(England) Conan Whitehead	4	1	3	11	17	–6	82.64	2

Keegan Brown was also due to play in Group 12, but suffered Internet issues and had to be eliminated. It meant the result from the only game he played, a 5–3 defeat to Conan Whitehead, was voided, with the group becoming a three-man round robin, each player playing each other twice.

89.80 Max Hopp (Germany)	3 – 5	(Belgium) Mike De Decker 94.61
~~92.59~~ ~~Keegan Brown~~ (England)	~~3 – 5~~	(England) ~~Conan Whitehead~~ ~~97.36~~
87.53 Mike De Decker (Belgium)	2 – 5	(England) Conan Whitehead 87.58
81.32 Conan Whitehead (England)	3 – 5	(Germany) Max Hopp 81.86
85.98 Mike De Decker (Belgium)	3 – 5	(Germany) Max Hopp 90.35
81.95 Max Hopp (Germany)	5 – 2	(England) Conan Whitehead 83.63
77.60 Conan Whitehead (England)	1 – 5	(Belgium) Mike De Decker 89.33

=== Group 13 – 29 April ===
Pos.	Player	P	W	L	LF	LA	+/–	Avg	Pts
1	(England) Carl Wilkinson	3	3	0	15	5	+10	94.61	6
2	(England) Steve Beaton	3	1	2	8	11	–3	86.11	2
3	(England) Callan Rydz	3	1	2	9	12	–3	85.16	2
4	(England) Matthew Edgar	3	1	2	7	11	–4	90.22	2

82.68 Steve Beaton (England)	5 – 1	(England) Callan Rydz 71.63
90.72 Matthew Edgar (England)	0 – 5	(England) Carl Wilkinson 101.55
88.32 Callan Rydz (England)	3 – 5	(England) Carl Wilkinson 96.12
88.13 Steve Beaton (England)	1 – 5	(England) Matthew Edgar 92.37
87.95 Matthew Edgar (England)	2 – 5	(England) Callan Rydz 94.71
88.37 Carl Wilkinson (England)	5 – 2	(England) Steve Beaton 87.88

=== Group 14 – 30 April ===
Pos.	Player	P	W	L	LF	LA	+/–	Avg	Pts
1	(England) Chris Dobey	3	2	1	14	8	+6	97.80	4
2	(Netherlands) Ron Meulenkamp	3	2	1	11	10	+1	94.54	4
3	(Republic of Ireland) Ciarán Teehan	3	1	2	8	11	–3	89.74	2
4	(Hong Kong) Kai Fan Leung	3	1	2	10	14	–4	91.62	2

93.71 Chris Dobey (England)	5 – 2	(Republic of Ireland) Ciarán Teehan 89.51
93.60 Ron Meulenkamp (Netherlands)	5 – 4	(Hong Kong) Kai Fan Leung 91.23
91.41 Ciarán Teehan (Republic of Ireland)	5 – 1	(Hong Kong) Kai Fan Leung 85.04
97.09 Chris Dobey (England)	5 – 1	(Netherlands) Ron Meulenkamp 89.35
100.93 Ron Meulenkamp (Netherlands)	5 – 1	(Republic of Ireland) Ciarán Teehan 88.07
96.97 Kai Fan Leung (Hong Kong)	5 – 4	(England) Chris Dobey 101.65

=== Group 15 – 1 May ===
Pos.	Player	P	W	L	LF	LA	+/–	Avg	Pts
1	(England) Darren Webster	3	3	0	15	9	+6	88.43	6
2	(England) Bradley Brooks	3	1	2	12	11	+1	87.02	2
3	(England) Andy Hamilton	3	1	2	12	13	–1	89.28	2
4	(England) Scott Baker	3	1	2	8	14	–6	90.50	2

82.40 Darren Webster (England)	5 – 4	(England) Bradley Brooks 80.30
88.85 Scott Baker (England)	5 – 4	(England) Andy Hamilton 86.65
93.80 Bradley Brooks (England)	3 – 5	(England) Andy Hamilton 92.59
90.54 Darren Webster (England)	5 – 2	(England) Scott Baker 90.20
93.46 Scott Baker (England)	1 – 5	(England) Bradley Brooks 90.03
89.22 Andy Hamilton (England)	3 – 5	(England) Darren Webster 94.51

=== Group 16 – 2 May ===
Pos.	Player	P	W	L	LF	LA	+/–	Avg	Pts
1	(Canada) Jeff Smith	3	2	1	14	10	+4	90.11	4
2	(England) Martin Atkins	3	2	1	12	11	+1	91.31	4
3	(England) Ricky Evans	3	1	2	11	13	–2	91.24	2
4	(Germany) Christian Bunse	3	1	2	9	12	–3	82.79	2

90.40 Ricky Evans (England)	2 – 5	(England) Martin Atkins 90.57
85.29 Christian Bunse (Germany)	1 – 5	(Canada) Jeff Smith 94.80
89.53 Martin Atkins (England)	5 – 4	(Canada) Jeff Smith 91.40
92.26 Ricky Evans (England)	5 – 3	(Germany) Christian Bunse 75.77
88.69 Christian Bunse (Germany)	5 – 2	(England) Martin Atkins 94.40
85.85 Jeff Smith (Canada)	5 – 4	(England) Ricky Evans 91.01

=== Group 17 – 3 May ===
Pos.	Player	P	W	L	LF	LA	+/–	Avg	Pts
1	(Australia) Damon Heta	3	2	1	13	8	+5	85.95	4
2	(Scotland) John Henderson	3	2	1	13	10	+3	87.67	4
3	(Poland) Krzysztof Kciuk	3	2	1	14	11	+3	83.20	4
4	(England) Gary Blades	3	0	3	4	15	–11	77.86	0

87.46 John Henderson (Scotland)	5 – 4	(Poland) Krzysztof Kciuk 80.58
96.35 Damon Heta (Australia)	5 – 0	(England) Gary Blades 74.96
80.19 Krzysztof Kciuk (Poland)	5 – 3	(England) Gary Blades 79.54
88.05 John Henderson (Scotland)	3 – 5	(Australia) Damon Heta 84.23
81.50 Damon Heta (Australia)	3 – 5	(Poland) Krzysztof Kciuk 89.32
77.61 Gary Blades (England)	1 – 5	(Scotland) John Henderson 87.50

=== Group 18 – 4 May ===
Pos.	Player	P	W	L	LF	LA	+/–	Avg	Pts
1	(England) Stephen Bunting	3	3	0	15	6	+9	97.06	6
2	(Belgium) Kim Huybrechts	3	2	1	11	9	+3	92.45	4
3	(Austria) Harald Leitinger	3	1	2	10	10	0	92.02	2
4	(England) Nathan Derry	3	0	3	3	15	–12	76.66	0

100.72 Stephen Bunting (England)	5 – 4	(Austria) Harald Leitinger 91.14
87.84 Kim Huybrechts (Belgium)	5 – 2	(England) Nathan Derry 79.04
91.65 Harald Leitinger (Austria)	5 – 0	(England) Nathan Derry 81.52
98.17 Stephen Bunting (England)	5 – 1	(Belgium) Kim Huybrechts 89.55
101.79 Kim Huybrechts (Belgium)	5 – 1	(Austria) Harald Leitinger 93.66
70.21 Nathan Derry (England)	1 – 5	(England) Stephen Bunting 91.36

=== Group 19 – 5 May ===
Pos.	Player	P	W	L	LF	LA	+/–	Avg	Pts
1	(England) Glen Durrant	3	3	0	15	7	+8	99.85	6
2	(England) Justin Pipe	3	2	1	13	8	+5	90.80	4
3	(Netherlands) Maik Kuivenhoven	3	1	2	9	11	–2	90.83	2
4	(Netherlands) Vincent van der Meer	3	0	3	4	15	–11	81.27	0

101.79 Glen Durrant (England)	5 – 1	(Netherlands) Vincent van der Meer 85.93
91.05 Justin Pipe (England)	5 – 1	(Netherlands) Maik Kuivenhoven 87.50
82.29 Vincent van der Meer (Netherlands)	1 – 5	(Netherlands) Maik Kuivenhoven 87.84
98.22 Glen Durrant (England)	5 – 3	(England) Justin Pipe 96.23
85.18 Justin Pipe (England)	5 – 2	(Netherlands) Vincent van der Meer 76.91
96.13 Maik Kuivenhoven (Netherlands)	3 – 5	(England) Glen Durrant 100.13

=== Group 20 – 6 May ===
Pos.	Player	P	W	L	LF	LA	+/–	Avg	Pts
1	(Scotland) Ryan Murray	3	2	1	14	9	+5	89.61	4
2	(England) Joe Cullen	3	2	1	14	12	+2	91.89	4
3	(Greece) John Michael	3	1	2	11	12	–1	91.12	2
4	(Netherlands) Jermaine Wattimena	3	1	2	8	14	–6	88.31	2

Jeffrey de Zwaan was due to play in Group 20, but suffered a shoulder injury and was therefore replaced by Jermaine Wattimena.

89.98 Joe Cullen (England)	5 – 4	(Scotland) Ryan Murray 86.37
91.97 Jermaine Wattimena (Netherlands)	2 – 5	(Greece) John Michael 95.18
88.59 Ryan Murray (Scotland)	5 – 3	(Greece) John Michael 87.46
89.52 Joe Cullen (England)	4 – 5	(Netherlands) Jermaine Wattimena 86.61
86.63 Jermaine Wattimena (Netherlands)	1 – 5	(Scotland) Ryan Murray 95.93
91.29 John Michael (Greece)	3 – 5	(England) Joe Cullen 96.88

=== Group 21 – 7 May ===
Pos.	Player	P	W	L	LF	LA	+/–	Avg	Pts
1	(England) Rob Cross	3	3	0	15	10	+5	82.08	6
2	(Belgium) Dimitri Van den Bergh	3	1	2	12	11	+1	95.32	2
3	(Czech Republic) Karel Sedláček	3	1	2	10	10	0	87.47	2
4	(Scotland) William Borland	3	1	2	7	13	–6	88.03	2

Derk Telnekes was due to play in Group 21, but had to withdraw for family reasons, and was replaced by Karel Sedláček.

79.29 Rob Cross (England)	5 – 2	(Scotland) William Borland 77.41
97.70 Dimitri Van den Bergh (Belgium)	5 – 1	(Czech Republic) Karel Sedláček 85.72
82.54 William Borland (Scotland)	0 – 5	(Czech Republic) Karel Sedláček 93.94
81.42 Rob Cross (England)	5 – 4	(Belgium) Dimitri Van den Bergh 91.17
98.86 Dimitri Van den Bergh (Belgium)	3 – 5	(Scotland) William Borland 103.80
85.00 Karel Sedláček (Czech Republic)	4 – 5	(England) Rob Cross 85.17

=== Group 22 – 8 May ===
Pos.	Player	P	W	L	LF	LA	+/–	Avg	Pts
1	(Spain) Jesús Noguera	3	2	1	12	10	+2	82.16	4
2	(Netherlands) Danny Noppert	3	2	1	12	11	+1	85.15	4
3	(England) Ian White	3	1	2	12	12	0	85.91	2
4	(England) James Wilson	3	1	2	11	14	–3	86.18	2

87.11 Ian White (England)	3 – 5	(Spain) Jesús Noguera 83.18
91.53 Danny Noppert (Netherlands)	5 – 4	(England) James Wilson 92.98
84.93 Jesús Noguera (Spain)	5 – 2	(England) James Wilson 79.87
81.21 Ian White (England)	5 – 2	(Netherlands) Danny Noppert 79.78
83.36 Danny Noppert (Netherlands)	5 – 2	(Spain) Jesús Noguera 78.25
84.99 James Wilson (England)	5 – 4	(England) Ian White 89.03

=== Group 23 – 9 May ===
Pos.	Player	P	W	L	LF	LA	+/–	Avg	Pts
1	(Sweden) Daniel Larsson	3	3	0	15	4	+11	87.58	6
2	(Netherlands) Dirk van Duijvenbode	3	1	2	10	11	–1	85.80	2
3	(Germany) Martin Schindler	3	1	2	6	10	–4	85.58	2
4	(Australia) Kyle Anderson	3	1	2	7	13	–6	76.74	2

80.23 Kyle Anderson (Australia)	2 – 5	(Sweden) Daniel Larsson 83.04
80.90 Martin Schindler (Germany)	1 – 5	(Netherlands) Dirk van Duijvenbode 93.92
84.05 Daniel Larsson (Sweden)	5 – 2	(Netherlands) Dirk van Duijvenbode 89.42
71.68 Kyle Anderson (Australia)	0 – 5	(Germany) Martin Schindler 89.46
87.08 Martin Schindler (Germany)	0 – 5	(Sweden) Daniel Larsson 100.20
78.00 Dirk van Duijvenbode (Netherlands)	3 – 5	(Australia) Kyle Anderson 76.78

=== Group 24 – 10 May ===
Pos.	Player	P	W	L	LF	LA	+/–	Avg	Pts
1	(England) Jamie Hughes	3	3	0	15	8	+7	91.65	6
2	(Poland) Krzysztof Ratajski	3	2	1	12	11	+1	89.24	4
3	(Lithuania) Darius Labanauskas	3	1	2	10	10	0	86.79	2
4	(Spain) Toni Alcinas	3	0	3	7	15	–8	89.43	0

91.75 Krzysztof Ratajski (Poland)	5 – 3	(Spain) Toni Alcinas 90.20
90.79 Krzysztof Ratajski (Poland)	2 – 5	(England) Jamie Hughes 96.58
87.91 Jamie Hughes (England)	5 – 2	(Lithuania) Darius Labanauskas 81.87
91.16 Toni Alcinas (Spain)	0 – 5	(Lithuania) Darius Labanauskas 96.35
91.17 Jamie Hughes (England)	5 – 4	(Spain) Toni Alcinas 87.81
85.40 Darius Labanauskas (Lithuania)	3 – 5	(Poland) Krzysztof Ratajski 85.82

=== Group 25 – 11 May ===
Pos.	Player	P	W	L	LF	LA	+/–	Avg	Pts
1	(Portugal) José de Sousa	3	3	0	15	1	+14	104.80	6
2	(England) Keegan Brown	3	2	1	10	11	–1	91.04	4
3	(England) Reece Robinson	3	1	2	10	12	–2	97.88	2
4	(Scotland) Robert Thornton	3	0	3	4	15	–11	88.84	0

89.10 Keegan Brown (England)	5 – 4	(England) Reece Robinson 92.44
110.51 José de Sousa (Portugal)	5 – 0	(Scotland) Robert Thornton 77.41
110.80 Reece Robinson (England)	5 – 2	(Scotland) Robert Thornton 104.69
84.88 Keegan Brown (England)	0 – 5	(Portugal) José de Sousa 97.60
106.79 José de Sousa (Portugal)	5 – 1	(England) Reece Robinson 92.67
82.88 Robert Thornton (Scotland)	2 – 5	(England) Keegan Brown 98.05

=== Group 26 – 12 May ===
Pos.	Player	P	W	L	LF	LA	+/–	Avg	Pts
1	(Belgium) Mike De Decker	3	2	1	13	8	+5	92.82	4
2	(England) Steve Brown	3	2	1	12	7	+5	89.84	4
3	(England) Martin Atkins	3	2	1	12	12	+0	95.40	4
4	(England) Conan Whitehead	3	0	3	5	15	–10	82.34	0

82.89 Conan Whitehead (England)	0 – 5	(England) Steve Brown 91.65
97.33 Mike De Decker (Belgium)	3 – 5	(England) Martin Atkins 102.00
93.78 Steve Brown (England)	5 – 2	(England) Martin Atkins 94.60
77.00 Conan Whitehead (England)	1 – 5	(Belgium) Mike De Decker 87.09
93.84 Mike De Decker (Belgium)	5 – 2	(England) Steve Brown 84.42
90.79 Martin Atkins (England)	5 – 4	(England) Conan Whitehead 85.91

=== Group 27 – 13 May ===
Pos.	Player	P	W	L	LF	LA	+/–	Avg	Pts
1	(England) Scott Waites	3	3	0	15	5	+10	95.83	6
2	(England) Ross Smith	3	2	1	12	10	+2	96.15	4
3	(Netherlands) Ron Meulenkamp	3	1	2	6	14	–8	91.10	2
4	(England) Steve Beaton	3	0	3	11	15	–4	90.17	0

92.50 Steve Beaton (England)	3 – 5	(England) Scott Waites 97.41
99.71 Ross Smith (England)	5 – 1	(Netherlands) Ron Meulenkamp 89.23
90.54 Scott Waites (England)	5 – 0	(Netherlands) Ron Meulenkamp 93.28
86.67 Steve Beaton (England)	4 – 5	(England) Ross Smith 91.98
98.97 Ross Smith (England)	2 – 5	(England) Scott Waites 98.61
91.08 Ron Meulenkamp (Netherlands)	5 – 4	(England) Steve Beaton 92.18

=== Group 28 – 14 May ===
Pos.	Player	P	W	L	LF	LA	+/–	Avg	Pts
1	(England) Luke Humphries	3	3	0	15	9	+6	101.83	6
2	(England) Michael Smith	3	2	1	12	7	+5	93.76	4
3	(England) Andy Boulton	3	1	2	11	14	–3	97.11	2
4	(Netherlands) Mike van Duivenbode	3	0	3	7	15	–8	96.67	0

97.60 Michael Smith (England)	5 – 0	(Netherlands) Mike van Duivenbode 93.44
100.88 Luke Humphries (England)	5 – 4	(England) Andy Boulton 98.02
97.14 Mike van Duivenbode (Netherlands)	4 – 5	(England) Andy Boulton 103.49
97.09 Michael Smith (England)	2 – 5	(England) Luke Humphries 108.55
97.85 Luke Humphries (England)	5 – 3	(Netherlands) Mike van Duivenbode 98.25
88.98 Andy Boulton (England)	2 – 5	(England) Michael Smith 88.46

=== Group 29 – 15 May ===
Pos.	Player	P	W	L	LF	LA	+/–	Avg	Pts
1	(Spain) Cristo Reyes	3	3	0	15	10	+5	94.96	6
2	(Scotland) John Henderson	3	2	1	14	9	+5	99.08	4
3	(Netherlands) Danny Noppert	3	1	2	11	12	–1	93.39	2
4	(England) Ryan Meikle	3	0	3	6	15	–9	87.05	0

90.76 Danny Noppert (Netherlands)	5 – 2	(England) Ryan Meikle 85.08
93.95 John Henderson (Scotland)	4 – 5	(Spain) Cristo Reyes 91.20
82.50 Ryan Meikle (England)	4 – 5	(Spain) Cristo Reyes 95.24
96.97 Danny Noppert (Netherlands)	4 – 5	(Scotland) John Henderson 101.58
104.38 John Henderson (Scotland)	5 – 0	(England) Ryan Meikle 99.86
99.41 Cristo Reyes (Spain)	5 – 2	(Netherlands) Danny Noppert 91.83

=== Group 30 – 16 May ===
Pos.	Player	P	W	L	LF	LA	+/–	Avg	Pts
1	(Scotland) Gary Anderson	3	3	0	15	4	+11	91.81	6
2	(Belgium) Kim Huybrechts	3	2	1	12	10	+2	91.28	4
3	(Belgium) Dimitri Van den Bergh	3	1	2	8	10	–2	89.24	2
4	(Netherlands) Dirk van Duijvenbode	3	0	3	4	15	–11	90.41	0

89.69 Gary Anderson (Scotland)	5 – 1	(Netherlands) Dirk van Duijvenbode 91.03
88.16 Dimitri Van den Bergh (Belgium)	2 – 5	(Belgium) Kim Huybrechts 96.70
92.14 Dirk van Duijvenbode (Netherlands)	3 – 5	(Belgium) Kim Huybrechts 90.10
92.66 Gary Anderson (Scotland)	5 – 1	(Belgium) Dimitri Van den Bergh 83.72
97.60 Dimitri Van den Bergh (Belgium)	5 – 0	(Netherlands) Dirk van Duijvenbode 86.58
87.23 Kim Huybrechts (Belgium)	2 – 5	(Scotland) Gary Anderson 92.92

=== Group 31 – 17 May ===
Pos.	Player	P	W	L	LF	LA	+/–	Avg	Pts
1	(England) Joe Cullen	3	3	0	15	5	+10	106.65	6
2	(England) Keegan Brown	3	2	1	12	10	+2	96.27	4
3	(Wales) Gerwyn Price	3	1	2	12	13	–1	94.76	2
4	(England) Bradley Brooks	3	0	3	4	15	–11	83.78	0

97.40 Gerwyn Price (Wales)	5 – 3	(England) Bradley Brooks 84.57
106.17 Joe Cullen (England)	5 – 2	(England) Keegan Brown 96.65
84.75 Bradley Brooks (England)	1 – 5	(England) Keegan Brown 101.31
103.28 Gerwyn Price (Wales)	3 – 5	(England) Joe Cullen 107.64
105.85 Joe Cullen (England)	5 – 0	(England) Bradley Brooks 81.09
92.91 Keegan Brown (England)	5 – 4	(Wales) Gerwyn Price 86.31

=== Group 32 – 18 May ===
Pos.	Player	P	W	L	LF	LA	+/–	Avg	Pts
1	(Scotland) Peter Wright	3	2	1	14	11	+3	96.07	4
2	(England) Adam Hunt	3	2	1	12	12	0	93.37	4
3	(Poland) Krzysztof Ratajski	3	1	2	13	10	+3	97.35	2
4	(England) Justin Pipe	3	1	2	8	14	–6	92.10	2

101.27 Peter Wright (Scotland)	5 – 2	(England) Adam Hunt 88.70
95.13 Krzysztof Ratajski (Poland)	5 – 0	(England) Justin Pipe 89.42
95.36 Adam Hunt (England)	5 – 3	(England) Justin Pipe 94.97
97.22 Peter Wright (Scotland)	5 – 4	(Poland) Krzysztof Ratajski 98.98
97.19 Krzysztof Ratajski (Poland)	4 – 5	(England) Adam Hunt 95.04
91.09 Justin Pipe (England)	5 – 4	(Scotland) Peter Wright 90.81

== Play-Off Phase ==
In the play-offs phase taking place between 26 May and 2 June, the 32 winners will again be put into groups of four, where all players will play each other over one night, but each match is now a best of 11 legs match, but all other rules being the same. The eight winners in the second phase will then move into a semi-final group stage taking place on 3 & 4 June, with the top two in each group moving forward to the Championship Group stage, where the winner will become the champion.
