= 2020 PDC Home Tour Play-Offs =

Special darts tournament in 2020

2020 Low6 Home Tour Play-Offs

Tournament information
- Dates: 26 May–5 June 2020
- Location: Various
- Country: Various
- Organisation(s): PDC
- Format: Legs
- High checkout: 170 (England) Joe Cullen (Last 8, Group 2)

Champion(s)
- (England) Nathan Aspinall

The 2020 Low6 Home Tour Play-Offs was a special tournament organised by the Professional Darts Corporation for players to play indoor tournaments at their homes during the COVID-19 pandemic.

It began on 17 April 2020 with the 2020 PDC Home Tour, with the Play-Offs commencing on 26 May 2020, and ended on 5 June 2020. The tournament was open to all players who had a PDC Tour Card in 2020.

The winner was Nathan Aspinall, who won the final Championship Group, finishing ahead of Gary Anderson, Jonny Clayton and Jelle Klaasen. Therefore, Aspinall earned a place in the 2020 Grand Slam of Darts.

== Format ==
In the play-offs phase taking place between 26 May and 2 June, the 32 winners were again put into groups of four, where all players played each other over one night, but each match was now a best of 11 legs match, but all other rules were the same. The eight winners in the second phase then moved into a semi-final group stage taking place on 3 and 4 June, with the top two in each group moving forward to the Championship Group stage, where the winner was to become the champion.

Each match was a best of 11 legs match, with the winner of each match getting two points on the table. In case of a tie on points after all the matches, the leg difference determined the winner. If that was also equal, the result between the two players was taken into account. In case of a three-way tie for first place, the overall average of the players was to be taken into account.

== Play-Off Groups ==
All matches first to 6 (best-of-11 legs)

NB: P = Played; W = Won; L = Lost; LF = Legs for; LA = Legs against; +/− = Plus/minus record, in relation to legs; Avg = Three-dart average in group matches; Pts = Group points

=== Play-Off Qualifiers ===
All 32 2020 PDC Home Tour winners were put into a pool based on their PDC Order of Merit ranking. The groups they were put in were pre-determined by their PDC Order of Merit ranking.

Pool A	Pool B	Pool C	Pool D
(Scotland) Peter Wright (2) (England) Rob Cross (4) (England) Nathan Aspinall (7) (Scotland) Gary Anderson (9) (England) Dave Chisnall (11) (Wales) Jonny Clayton (15) (England) Joe Cullen (16) (England) Stephen Bunting (17)	(England) Glen Durrant (19) (England) Chris Dobey (20) (Germany) Max Hopp (24) (England) Darren Webster (27) (England) Luke Humphries (34) (England) Jamie Hughes (41) (England) Ryan Searle (42) (Spain) Cristo Reyes (46)	(Netherlands) Jelle Klaasen (48) (England) Luke Woodhouse (57) (Portugal) José de Sousa (59) (Wales) Jamie Lewis (60) (Netherlands) Geert Nentjes (71) (England) Carl Wilkinson (89) (Canada) Jeff Smith (92) (England) Alan Tabern (97)	(Belgium) Mike De Decker (100) (Netherlands) Martijn Kleermaker (101) (England) Scott Waites (102) (Australia) Damon Heta (106) (Wales) Nick Kenny (109) (Spain) Jesús Noguera (127) (Sweden) Daniel Larsson (130) (Scotland) Ryan Murray (135)

=== Group 1 – 26 May ===
Pos.	Player	P	W	L	LF	LA	+/–	Avg	Pts
1	(Netherlands) Jelle Klaasen (17)	3	2	1	17	11	+6	87.48	4
2	(Spain) Cristo Reyes (16)	3	2	1	17	14	+3	91.45	4
3	(Scotland) Peter Wright (1)	3	2	1	13	13	0	84.06	4
4	(Scotland) Ryan Murray (32)	3	0	3	9	18	–9	81.42	0

88.21 Peter Wright (Scotland)	6 – 2	(Scotland) Ryan Murray 87.72
92.96 Cristo Reyes (Spain)	6 – 5	(Netherlands) Jelle Klaasen 91.28
76.34 Ryan Murray (Scotland)	4 – 6	(Netherlands) Jelle Klaasen 81.99
83.06 Peter Wright (Scotland)	6 – 5	(Spain) Cristo Reyes 89.35
92.18 Cristo Reyes (Spain)	6 – 3	(Scotland) Ryan Murray 81.90
90.39 Jelle Klaasen (Netherlands)	6 – 1	(Scotland) Peter Wright 80.71

=== Group 2 – 27 May ===
Pos.	Player	P	W	L	LF	LA	+/–	Avg	Pts
1	(Belgium) Mike De Decker (25)	3	2	1	17	15	+2	93.91	4
2	(England) Stephen Bunting (8)	3	2	1	14	14	0	97.50	4
3	(England) Alan Tabern (24)	3	1	2	14	14	0	95.95	2
4	(England) Glen Durrant (9)	3	1	2	13	15	–2	98.33	2

101.28 Stephen Bunting (England)	6 – 5	(Belgium) Mike De Decker 90.48
104.20 Glen Durrant (England)	6 – 3	(England) Alan Tabern 97.88
98.48 Mike De Decker (Belgium)	6 – 5	(England) Alan Tabern 95.80
101.05 Stephen Bunting (England)	6 – 3	(England) Glen Durrant 98.46
93.38 Glen Durrant (England)	4 – 6	(Belgium) Mike De Decker 92.90
94.30 Alan Tabern (England)	6 – 2	(England) Stephen Bunting 89.00

=== Group 3 – 28 May ===
Pos.	Player	P	W	L	LF	LA	+/–	Avg	Pts
1	(Scotland) Gary Anderson (4)	3	3	0	18	6	+12	97.40	6
2	(England) Luke Humphries (13)	3	2	1	13	9	+4	99.05	4
3	(Wales) Jamie Lewis (20)	3	1	2	11	16	–5	90.11	2
4	(Wales) Nick Kenny (29)	3	0	3	7	18	–11	87.11	0

87.26 Gary Anderson (Scotland)	6 – 2	(Wales) Nick Kenny 83.34
100.73 Luke Humphries (England)	6 – 2	(Wales) Jamie Lewis 93.13
87.32 Nick Kenny (Wales)	4 – 6	(Wales) Jamie Lewis 91.41
110.12 Gary Anderson (Scotland)	6 – 1	(England) Luke Humphries 101.97
94.60 Luke Humphries (England)	6 – 1	(Wales) Nick Kenny 91.84
86.16 Jamie Lewis (Wales)	3 – 6	(Scotland) Gary Anderson 98.65

=== Group 4 – 29 May ===
Pos.	Player	P	W	L	LF	LA	+/–	Avg	Pts
1	(England) Dave Chisnall (5)	3	2	1	17	11	+6	94.16	4
2	(Netherlands) Geert Nentjes (21)	3	2	1	15	16	–1	87.89	4
3	(England) Darren Webster (12)	3	1	2	13	14	–1	92.90	2
4	(Australia) Damon Heta (28)	3	1	2	13	17	–4	90.44	2

94.76 Dave Chisnall (England)	5 – 6	(Australia) Damon Heta 94.52
93.38 Darren Webster (England)	5 – 6	(Netherlands) Geert Nentjes 89.77
94.53 Damon Heta (Australia)	5 – 6	(Netherlands) Geert Nentjes 85.34
94.99 Dave Chisnall (England)	6 – 2	(England) Darren Webster 94.99
90.41 Darren Webster (England)	6 – 2	(Australia) Damon Heta 79.79
88.75 Geert Nentjes (Netherlands)	3 – 6	(England) Dave Chisnall 92.64

=== Group 5 – 30 May ===
Pos.	Player	P	W	L	LF	LA	+/–	Avg	Pts
1	(England) Rob Cross (2)	3	2	1	17	13	+4	83.17	4
2	(England) Ryan Searle (15)	3	2	1	16	14	+2	91.97	4
3	(England) Luke Woodhouse (18)	3	1	2	15	17	–2	84.55	2
4	(Sweden) Daniel Larsson (31)	3	1	2	13	17	–4	87.48	2

91.49 Rob Cross (England)	6 – 3	(Sweden) Daniel Larsson 92.26
98.79 Ryan Searle (England)	6 – 4	(England) Luke Woodhouse 88.93
85.18 Daniel Larsson (Sweden)	6 – 5	(England) Luke Woodhouse 84.73
93.84 Rob Cross (England)	6 – 4	(England) Ryan Searle 88.79
88.86 Ryan Searle (England)	6 – 4	(Sweden) Daniel Larsson 86.30
81.30 Luke Woodhouse (England)	6 – 5	(England) Rob Cross 70.26

=== Group 6 – 31 May ===
Pos.	Player	P	W	L	LF	LA	+/–	Avg	Pts
1	(England) Joe Cullen (7)	3	3	0	18	12	+6	94.87	6
2	(Canada) Jeff Smith (23)	3	2	1	16	12	+4	96.97	4
3	(England) Chris Dobey (10)	3	1	2	12	15	–3	95.10	2
4	(Netherlands) Martijn Kleermaker (26)	3	0	3	11	18	–7	92.00	0

95.27 Joe Cullen (England)	6 – 3	(Netherlands) Martijn Kleermaker 93.09
94.46 Chris Dobey (England)	1 – 6	(Canada) Jeff Smith 100.09
89.69 Martijn Kleermaker (Netherlands)	5 – 6	(Canada) Jeff Smith 97.24
96.85 Joe Cullen (England)	6 – 5	(England) Chris Dobey 93.50
97.44 Chris Dobey (England)	6 – 3	(Netherlands) Martijn Kleermaker 93.77
94.51 Jeff Smith (Canada)	4 – 6	(England) Joe Cullen 92.36

=== Group 7 – 1 June ===
Pos.	Player	P	W	L	LF	LA	+/–	Avg	Pts
1	(England) Nathan Aspinall (3)	3	3	0	18	10	+8	89.26	6
2	(Portugal) José de Sousa (19)	3	2	1	16	11	+5	95.72	4
3	(England) Jamie Hughes (14)	3	1	2	9	16	–7	89.32	2
4	(Spain) Jesús Noguera (30)	3	0	3	12	18	–6	90.71	0

91.24 Nathan Aspinall (England)	6 – 4	(Spain) Jesús Noguera 94.63
92.76 Jamie Hughes (England)	1 – 6	(Portugal) José de Sousa 103.45
85.17 Jesús Noguera (Spain)	4 – 6	(Portugal) José de Sousa 95.80
86.64 Nathan Aspinall (England)	6 – 2	(England) Jamie Hughes 84.81
91.04 Jamie Hughes (England)	6 – 4	(Spain) Jesús Noguera 92.40
90.66 José de Sousa (Portugal)	4 – 6	(England) Nathan Aspinall 89.69

=== Group 8 – 2 June ===
Pos.	Player	P	W	L	LF	LA	+/–	Avg	Pts
1	(Wales) Jonny Clayton (6)	3	3	0	18	8	+10	99.09	6
2	(England) Scott Waites (27)	3	2	1	15	7	+8	91.99	4
3	(Germany) Max Hopp (11)	3	1	2	10	15	–5	86.26	2
4	(England) Carl Wilkinson (22)	3	0	3	5	18	–13	80.18	0

103.86 Jonny Clayton (Wales)	6 – 3	(England) Scott Waites 99.55
83.90 Max Hopp (Germany)	6 – 3	(England) Carl Wilkinson 84.81
86.71 Scott Waites (England)	6 – 0	(England) Carl Wilkinson 73.41
101.95 Jonny Clayton (Wales)	6 – 3	(Germany) Max Hopp 93.78
81.72 Max Hopp (Germany)	1 – 6	(England) Scott Waites 89.00
79.91 Carl Wilkinson (England)	2 – 6	(Wales) Jonny Clayton 91.91

== Semi-final groups ==
The semi-final groups consisted of the eight winners from the Last 32 stages, with the winners of Groups 1–4 in semi-final Group 1 and the winners of Groups 5–8 in semi-final Group 2.

All matches first to 6 (best-of-11 legs)

NB: P = Played; W = Won; L = Lost; LF = Legs for; LA = Legs against; +/− = Plus/minus record, in relation to legs; Avg = Three-dart average in group matches; Pts = Group points

=== Group 1 – 3 June ===
Pos.	Player	P	W	L	LF	LA	+/–	Avg	Pts
1	(Scotland) Gary Anderson (4)	3	3	0	18	10	+8	94.73	6
2	(Netherlands) Jelle Klaasen (17)	3	2	1	14	11	+3	87.59	4
3	(England) Dave Chisnall (5)	3	1	2	11	17	–6	90.01	2
4	(Belgium) Mike De Decker (25)	3	0	3	13	18	–5	87.10	0

93.43Gary Anderson (Scotland)	6 – 5	(Belgium) Mike De Decker 92.76
86.40 Dave Chisnall (England)	2 – 6	(Netherlands) Jelle Klaasen 86.47
80.05 Mike De Decker (Belgium)	3 – 6	(Netherlands) Jelle Klaasen 88.48
98.14 Gary Anderson (Scotland)	6 – 3	(England) Dave Chisnall 89.31
93.29 Dave Chisnall (England)	6 – 5	(Belgium) Mike De Decker 87.84
87.71 Jelle Klaasen (Netherlands)	2 – 6	(Scotland) Gary Anderson 92.76

=== Group 2 – 4 June ===
Pos.	Player	P	W	L	LF	LA	+/–	Avg	Pts
1	(Wales) Jonny Clayton (6)	3	2	1	17	12	+5	95.42	4
2	(England) Nathan Aspinall (3)	3	2	1	17	16	+1	102.72	4
3	(England) Joe Cullen (7)	3	1	2	16	16	0	93.61	2
4	(England) Rob Cross (2)	3	1	2	11	17	–6	97.86	2

91.55 Rob Cross (England)	4 – 6	(England) Joe Cullen 99.33
106.70 Nathan Aspinall (England)	6 – 5	(Wales) Jonny Clayton 100.24
89.68 Joe Cullen (England)	5 – 6	(Wales) Jonny Clayton 90.50
107.53 Rob Cross (England)	6 – 5	(England) Nathan Aspinall 104.82
97.30 Nathan Aspinall (England)	6 – 5	(England) Joe Cullen 92.54
97.01 Jonny Clayton (Wales)	6 – 1	(England) Rob Cross 92.75

== Championship Group – 5 June ==
The Championship Group consisted of the top 2 players from the 2 semi-final groups.

All matches first to 6 (best-of-11 legs)

NB: P = Played; W = Won; L = Lost; LF = Legs for; LA = Legs against; +/− = Plus/minus record, in relation to legs; Avg = Three-dart average in group matches; Pts = Group points

Pos.	Player	P	W	L	LF	LA	+/–	Avg	Pts
Winner	(England) Nathan Aspinall (3)	3	3	0	18	12	+6	98.67	6
Runner-up	(Scotland) Gary Anderson (4)	3	2	1	17	11	+6	101.51	4
3	(Wales) Jonny Clayton (6)	3	1	2	12	14	–2	97.71	2
4	(Netherlands) Jelle Klaasen (17)	3	0	3	8	18	−10	86.47	0

97.04 Nathan Aspinall (England)	6 – 3	(Netherlands) Jelle Klaasen 83.66
109.19 Gary Anderson (Scotland)	6 – 2	(Wales) Jonny Clayton 96.91
88.68 Jelle Klaasen (Netherlands)	2 – 6	(Wales) Jonny Clayton 96.73
106.37 Nathan Aspinall (England)	6 – 5	(Scotland) Gary Anderson 101.15
95.98 Gary Anderson (Scotland)	6 – 3	(Netherlands) Jelle Klaasen 87.29
99.15 Jonny Clayton (Wales)	4 – 6	(England) Nathan Aspinall 92.61
