= List of players with a 2019 PDC Tour Card =

A Tour Card is needed to compete in Professional Darts Corporation ProTour tournaments.

In total 128 players are granted Tour Cards, which enables them to participate in all Players Championships and European Tour Qualifiers.

Most Tour Cards are valid for 2 years. The top 64 in the PDC Order of Merit all received Tour Cards automatically, and those who won a two-year card in 2018 still had a valid card for 2019. The top 2 of the 2018 Challenge Tour and Development Tour also won cards. 30 remaining places will be played out at the 2019 Q-Schools, with the four days of competition giving two Cards a day from the UK Q-School and one a day from the European Q-School; with the remaining players being ranked and the top players also receiving Cards. All players who will win a card at either Q-School have their Order of Merit ranking reset to zero.

== Players ==
No.	Country	Player	Prize money	Qualified through
1	Netherlands	Michael van Gerwen	£1,603,500	Top 64 of Order of Merit
2	England	Rob Cross	£785,750	Top 64 of Order of Merit
3	Scotland	Peter Wright	£677,500	Top 64 of Order of Merit
4	Scotland	Gary Anderson	£580,000	Top 64 of Order of Merit
5	Northern Ireland	Daryl Gurney	£539,250	Top 64 of Order of Merit
6	England	Michael Smith	£505,500	Top 64 of Order of Merit
7	Wales	Gerwyn Price	£404,750	Top 64 of Order of Merit
8	Austria	Mensur Suljović	£389,750	Top 64 of Order of Merit
9	Australia	Simon Whitlock	£350,750	Top 64 of Order of Merit
10	England	James Wade	£341,000	Top 64 of Order of Merit
11	England	Ian White	£281,750	Top 64 of Order of Merit
12	England	Dave Chisnall	£279,750	Top 64 of Order of Merit
13	England	Darren Webster	£254,750	Top 64 of Order of Merit
14	England	Adrian Lewis	£242,750	Top 64 of Order of Merit
15	England	Joe Cullen	£242,000	Top 64 of Order of Merit
16	Wales	Jonny Clayton	£232,750	Top 64 of Order of Merit
17	England	Stephen Bunting	£207,250	Top 64 of Order of Merit
18	England	Mervyn King	£202,250	Top 64 of Order of Merit
19	England	Steve West	£191,750	Top 64 of Order of Merit
20	Scotland	John Henderson	£189,750	Top 64 of Order of Merit
21	England	Steve Beaton	£188,250	Top 64 of Order of Merit
22	Belgium	Kim Huybrechts	£184,000	Top 64 of Order of Merit
23	Australia	Kyle Anderson	£181,250	Top 64 of Order of Merit
24	England	Alan Norris	£170,250	Top 64 of Order of Merit
25	England	James Wilson	£165,500	Top 64 of Order of Merit
26	Wales	Jamie Lewis	£163,750	Top 64 of Order of Merit
27	Netherlands	Jelle Klaasen	£163,250	Top 64 of Order of Merit
28	Netherlands	Raymond van Barneveld	£160,750	Top 64 of Order of Merit
29	Netherlands	Jermaine Wattimena	£156,000	Top 64 of Order of Merit
30	Netherlands	Benito van de Pas	£150,750	Top 64 of Order of Merit
31	Spain	Cristo Reyes	£147,500	Top 64 of Order of Merit
32	Germany	Max Hopp	£144,750	Top 64 of Order of Merit
33	Belgium	Dimitri Van den Bergh	£133,250	Top 64 of Order of Merit
34	England	Nathan Aspinall	£133,000	Top 64 of Order of Merit
35	England	Chris Dobey	£133,000	Top 64 of Order of Merit
36	Netherlands	Vincent van der Voort	£129,000	Top 64 of Order of Merit
37	England	Keegan Brown	£128,250	Top 64 of Order of Merit
38	Ireland	Steve Lennon	£128,000	Top 64 of Order of Merit
39	England	Richard North	£123,500	Top 64 of Order of Merit
40	Northern Ireland	Brendan Dolan	£118,750	Top 64 of Order of Merit
41	Scotland	Robert Thornton	£117,500	Top 64 of Order of Merit
42	England	Justin Pipe	£109,000	Top 64 of Order of Merit
43	Netherlands	Jan Dekker	£104,750	Top 64 of Order of Merit
44	Netherlands	Jeffrey de Zwaan	£102,000	Top 64 of Order of Merit
45	Ireland	William O'Connor	£99,500	Top 64 of Order of Merit
46	Netherlands	Danny Noppert	£97,000	Top 64 of Order of Merit
47	Germany	Martin Schindler	£95,000	Top 64 of Order of Merit
48	Spain	Toni Alcinas	£90,000	Top 64 of Order of Merit
49	England	Ricky Evans	£89,250	Top 64 of Order of Merit
50	England	Ryan Searle	£87,000	Top 64 of Order of Merit
51	England	Ryan Joyce	£82,750	Top 64 of Order of Merit
52	Netherlands	Ron Meulenkamp	£82,500	Top 64 of Order of Merit
53	Poland	Krzysztof Ratajski	£78,000	Top 64 of Order of Merit
54	England	Josh Payne	£77,750	Top 64 of Order of Merit
55	England	James Richardson	£74,250	Top 64 of Order of Merit
56	Wales	Mark Webster	£72,250	Top 64 of Order of Merit
57	England	Luke Humphries	£71,750	Top 64 of Order of Merit
58	Netherlands	Christian Kist	£71,000	Top 64 of Order of Merit
59	Belgium	Ronny Huybrechts	£63,750	Top 64 of Order of Merit
60	South Africa	Devon Petersen	£63,000	Top 64 of Order of Merit
61	Austria	Zoran Lerchbacher	£61,000	Top 64 of Order of Merit
62	Germany	Gabriel Clemens	£55,750	Top 64 of Order of Merit
63	Northern Ireland	Mickey Mansell	£55,500	Top 64 of Order of Merit
64	Australia	Corey Cadby	£54,500	Top 64 of Order of Merit
65	England	Alan Tabern	£36,500	2018 Q-School
66	England	Ross Smith	£36,250	2018 Q-School
67	England	Simon Stevenson	£32,250	2018 Q-School
68	England	Matthew Edgar	£31,750	2018 Q-School
69	Wales	Robert Owen	£30,750	2018 Q-School
70	England	Wayne Jones	£26,250	2017 Challenge Tour
71	Germany	Robert Marijanović	£25,250	2018 Q-School
72	England	Adam Hunt	£23,000	2017 Development Tour
73	Northern Ireland	Kevin Burness	£18,500	2018 Q-School
74	England	Luke Woodhouse	£14,250	2018 Q-School
75	England	Ryan Meikle	£14,000	2018 Q-School
76	Netherlands	Dirk van Duijvenbode	£12,250	2018 Q-School
77	Poland	Tytus Kanik	£10,000	2018 Q-School
78	England	Peter Hudson	£9,500	2018 Q-School
79	Canada	Dawson Murschell	£9,000	2018 Q-School
80	England	Arron Monk	£8,500	2018 Q-School
81	England	Bradley Brooks	£8,250	2018 Q-School
82	England	Mark Wilson	£7,500	2018 Q-School
83	Belgium	Davy Van Baelen	£7,500	2018 Q-School
84	Spain	Jose Justicia	£7,000	2018 Q-School
85	England	Ryan Harrington	£6,750	2018 Q-School
86	Netherlands	Vincent Kamphuis	£6,500	2018 Q-School
87	England	George Killington	£5,750	2018 Q-School
88	Netherlands	Mario Robbe	£5,750	2018 Q-School
89	England	Tony Newell	£4,750	2018 Q-School
90	England	Gary Eastwood	£4,000	2018 Q-School
91	Scotland	John Goldie	£3,750	2018 Q-School
92	England	Mark Dudbridge	£3,250	2017 Challenge Tour
93	England	Terry Temple	£3,000	2018 Q-School
94	England	Eddie Dootson	£1,250	2018 Q-School
95	England	Michael Barnard	£0	2018 Challenge Tour
96	England	Ted Evetts	£0	2018 Challenge Tour
97	Netherlands	Geert Nentjes	£0	2018 Development Tour
98	Austria	Rowby-John Rodriguez	£0	2018 Development Tour
99	Netherlands	Niels Zonneveld	£0	2019 Q-School
100	Netherlands	Mike van Duivenbode	£0	2019 Q-School
101	Germany	Christian Bunse	£0	2019 Q-School
102	Lithuania	Darius Labanauskas	£0	2019 Q-School
103	Latvia	Madars Razma	£0	2019 Q-School
104	Finland	Marko Kantele	£0	2019 Q-School
105	Netherlands	Yordi Meeuwisse	£0	2019 Q-School
106	Netherlands	Vincent van der Meer	£0	2019 Q-School
107	Greece	John Michael	£0	2019 Q-School
108	Portugal	José de Sousa	£0	2019 Q-School
109	Netherlands	Maik Kuivenhoven	£0	2019 Q-School
110	England	Jamie Hughes	£0	2019 Q-School
111	England	Harry Ward	£0	2019 Q-School
112	England	Scott Baker	£0	2019 Q-School
113	England	Mark McGeeney	£0	2019 Q-School
114	England	Reece Robinson	£0	2019 Q-School
115	England	Matt Clark	£0	2019 Q-School
116	England	Kirk Shepherd	£0	2019 Q-School
117	England	Nathan Derry	£0	2019 Q-School
118	Wales	Jonathan Worsley	£0	2019 Q-School
119	England	Carl Wilkinson	£0	2019 Q-School
120	England	Glen Durrant	£0	2019 Q-School
121	Northern Ireland	Gavin Carlin	£0	2019 Q-School
122	England	Joe Murnan	£0	2019 Q-School
123	England	Adrian Gray	£0	2019 Q-School
124	England	Andy Boulton	£0	2019 Q-School
125	Scotland	Jamie Bain	£0	2019 Q-School
126	England	David Pallett	£0	2019 Q-School
127	England	Conan Whitehead	£0	2019 Q-School
128	Wales	Barrie Bates	£0	2019 Q-School

== Tour Cards per Nations ==
Nr.	Natiom	Number of players	Difference to prior Year
1.	England	61	−3
2.	Netherlands	20	+3
3.	Wales	7	±0
4.	Scotland	6	−1
5.	Germany	5	+1
5.	Northern Ireland	5	+1
7.	Belgium	4	±0
8.	Australia	3	−1
8.	Austria	3	−1
8.	Spain	3	±0
11.	Ireland	2	−1
11.	Poland	2	+1
13.	Finland	1	+1
13.	Greece	1	+1
13.	Canada	1	−2
13.	Latvia	1	±0
13.	Lithuania	1	+1
13.	Portugal	1	+1
13.	South Africa	1	±0
	19 Nations	128	

== See also ==
- List of darts players
- List of darts players who have switched organisation
