= List of players with a 2020 PDC Tour Card =

A 2020 Tour Card is needed to compete in Professional Darts Corporation ProTour tournaments.

In total 128 players are granted Tour Cards, which enables them to participate in all Players Championships and European Tour Qualifiers.

Most Tour Cards are valid for 2 years. The top 64 in the PDC Order of Merit all receive Tour Cards automatically, and those who won a two-year card in 2019 still had a valid card for 2020. The top 2 of the 2019 Challenge Tour and Development Tour also won cards. The remaining places were awarded at the 2020 Q-Schools, with four days of competition awarding two Tour Cards per day from the UK Q-School and one a day from the European Q-School; with the remaining players being ranked and the top players also receiving Tour Cards. All players who won a card at either Q-School had their Order of Merit ranking reset to zero.

Raymond van Barneveld retired after the 2020 PDC World Darts Championship, and Corey Cadby also resigned his card which allowed Toni Alcinas and Simon Stevenson to move into the top 64 and retain their Tour Cards. Jamie Bain resigned his Tour Card after the 2020 PDC World Darts Championship, as he couldn't commit to the full schedule, which opened a space in Q-School as Bain was outside the Top 64.

== Players ==
| No. | Country | Player | Prize money | Qualified through |
|---|---|---|---|---|
| 1 | Netherlands | Michael van Gerwen | £1,606,750 | Top 64 of Order of Merit |
| 2 | Scotland | Peter Wright | £944,500 | Top 64 of Order of Merit |
| 3 | Wales | Gerwyn Price | £762,250 | Top 64 of Order of Merit |
| 4 | England | Rob Cross | £596,750 | Top 64 of Order of Merit |
| 5 | England | Michael Smith | £570,000 | Top 64 of Order of Merit |
| 6 | Scotland | Gary Anderson | £531,500 | Top 64 of Order of Merit |
| 7 | Northern Ireland | Daryl Gurney | £469,750 | Top 64 of Order of Merit |
| 8 | England | Nathan Aspinall | £450,250 | Top 64 of Order of Merit |
| 9 | England | James Wade | £446,750 | Top 64 of Order of Merit |
| 10 | England | Dave Chisnall | £403,750 | Top 64 of Order of Merit |
| 11 | England | Ian White | £397,000 | Top 64 of Order of Merit |
| 12 | Austria | Mensur Suljović | £352,500 | Top 64 of Order of Merit |
| 13 | England | Adrian Lewis | £294,000 | Top 64 of Order of Merit |
| 14 | Australia | Simon Whitlock | £280,750 | Top 64 of Order of Merit |
| 15 | England | Joe Cullen | £257,500 | Top 64 of Order of Merit |
| 16 | Wales | Jonny Clayton | £254,750 | Top 64 of Order of Merit |
| 17 | England | Stephen Bunting | £251,500 | Top 64 of Order of Merit |
| 18 | Poland | Krzysztof Ratajski | £245,250 | Top 64 of Order of Merit |
| 19 | England | Chris Dobey | £239,500 | Top 64 of Order of Merit |
| 20 | Netherlands | Jeffrey de Zwaan | £236,250 | Top 64 of Order of Merit |
| 21 | England | Mervyn King | £231,000 | Top 64 of Order of Merit |
| 22 | England | Glen Durrant | £226,500 | Top 64 of Order of Merit |
| 23 | Netherlands | Jermaine Wattimena | £224,000 | Top 64 of Order of Merit |
| 24 | Germany | Max Hopp | £220,000 | Top 64 of Order of Merit |
| 25 | England | Darren Webster | £207,250 | Top 64 of Order of Merit |
| 26 | England | Steve Beaton | £206,250 | Top 64 of Order of Merit |
| 27 | Netherlands | Danny Noppert | £197,500 | Top 64 of Order of Merit |
| 28 | England | Ricky Evans | £194,000 | Top 64 of Order of Merit |
| 29 | Belgium | Dimitri Van den Bergh | £184,250 | Top 64 of Order of Merit |
| 30 | England | Keegan Brown | £174,250 | Top 64 of Order of Merit |
| 31 | Scotland | John Henderson | £172,250 | Top 64 of Order of Merit |
| 32 | England | Steve West | £160,750 | Top 64 of Order of Merit |
| 33 | Netherlands | Vincent van der Voort | £151,250 | Top 64 of Order of Merit |
| 34 | Northern Ireland | Brendan Dolan | £151,250 | Top 64 of Order of Merit |
| 35 | England | Luke Humphries | £150,000 | Top 64 of Order of Merit |
| 36 | Belgium | Kim Huybrechts | £149,250 | Top 64 of Order of Merit |
| 37 | Ireland | William O'Connor | £136,000 | Top 64 of Order of Merit |
| 38 | England | James Wilson | £136,000 | Top 64 of Order of Merit |
| 39 | Germany | Gabriel Clemens | £128,000 | Top 64 of Order of Merit |
| 40 | Australia | Kyle Anderson | £123,750 | Top 64 of Order of Merit |
| 41 | Ireland | Steve Lennon | £123,750 | Top 64 of Order of Merit |
| 42 | England | Ryan Joyce | £118,750 | Top 64 of Order of Merit |
| 43 | England | Josh Payne | £117,000 | Top 64 of Order of Merit |
| 44 | England | Ryan Searle | £113,500 | Top 64 of Order of Merit |
| 45 | Spain | Cristo Reyes | £112,000 | Top 64 of Order of Merit |
| 46 | Netherlands | Ron Meulenkamp | £107,250 | Top 64 of Order of Merit |
| 47 | England | Jamie Hughes | £103,750 | Top 64 of Order of Merit |
| 48 | England | Ross Smith | £103,000 | Top 64 of Order of Merit |
| 49 | Netherlands | Jelle Klaasen | £101,750 | Top 64 of Order of Merit |
| 50 | Germany | Martin Schindler | £82,000 | Top 64 of Order of Merit |
| 51 | Lithuania | Darius Labanauskas | £77,500 | Top 64 of Order of Merit |
| 52 | England | Richard North | £77,000 | Top 64 of Order of Merit |
| 53 | Netherlands | Benito van de Pas | £76,250 | Top 64 of Order of Merit |
| 54 | England | Justin Pipe | £75,500 | Top 64 of Order of Merit |
| 55 | Netherlands | Jan Dekker | £73,000 | Top 64 of Order of Merit |
| 56 | Wales | Jamie Lewis | £72,250 | Top 64 of Order of Merit |
| 57 | Northern Ireland | Mickey Mansell | £70,750 | Top 64 of Order of Merit |
| 58 | England | Luke Woodhouse | £67,500 | Top 64 of Order of Merit |
| 59 | South Africa | Devon Petersen | £65,750 | Top 64 of Order of Merit |
| 60 | Scotland | Robert Thornton | £64,750 | Top 64 of Order of Merit |
| 61 | Portugal | José de Sousa | £63,750 | Top 64 of Order of Merit |
| 62 | England | Matthew Edgar | £60,000 | Top 64 of Order of Merit |
| 63 | Spain | Toni Alcinas | £59,000 | Top 64 of Order of Merit |
| 64 | England | Simon Stevenson | £56,250 | Top 64 of Order of Merit |
| 65 | England | Harry Ward | £49,250 | 2019 Q-School |
| 66 | England | Mark McGeeney | £39,500 | 2019 Q-School |
| 67 | England | Andy Boulton | £35,750 | 2019 Q-School |
| 68 | England | Ted Evetts | £30,500 | 2018 Challenge Tour |
| 69 | Latvia | Madars Razma | £26,500 | 2019 Q-School |
| 70 | Austria | Rowby-John Rodriguez | £26,000 | 2018 Development Tour |
| 71 | Netherlands | Geert Nentjes | £18,500 | 2018 Development Tour |
| 72 | England | Scott Baker | £17,000 | 2019 Q-School |
| 73 | Northern Ireland | Gavin Carlin | £16,250 | 2019 Q-School |
| 74 | Finland | Marko Kantele | £16,000 | 2019 Q-School |
| 75 | England | Joe Murnan | £15,000 | 2019 Q-School |
| 76 | England | Conan Whitehead | £13,000 | 2019 Q-School |
| 77 | England | Kirk Shepherd | £13,000 | 2019 Q-School |
| 78 | England | Reece Robinson | £11,000 | 2019 Q-School |
| 79 | England | Matt Clark | £10,000 | 2019 Q-School |
| 80 | Germany | Christian Bunse | £10,000 | 2019 Q-School |
| 81 | England | Adrian Gray | £10,000 | 2019 Q-School |
| 82 | England | David Pallett | £9,500 | 2019 Q-School |
| 83 | Netherlands | Yordi Meeuwisse | £9,000 | 2019 Q-School |
| 84 | England | Carl Wilkinson | £9,000 | 2019 Q-School |
| 85 | Netherlands | Vincent van der Meer | £8,500 | 2019 Q-School |
| 86 | Netherlands | Maik Kuivenhoven | £7,500 | 2019 Q-School |
| 87 | Netherlands | Niels Zonneveld | £7,000 | 2019 Q-School |
| 88 | Greece | John Michael | £7,000 | 2019 Q-School |
| 89 | England | Nathan Derry | £7,000 | 2019 Q-School |
| 90 | Wales | Barrie Bates | £6,500 | 2019 Q-School |
| 91 | Wales | Jonathan Worsley | £6,500 | 2019 Q-School |
| 92 | Netherlands | Mike van Duivenbode | £5,000 | 2019 Q-School |
| 93 | England | Michael Barnard | £1,000 | 2018 Challenge Tour |
| 94 | England | Callan Rydz | £0 | 2019 Challenge Tour |
| 95 | Spain | Jesús Noguera | £0 | 2019 Challenge Tour |
| 96 | England | Ryan Meikle | £0 | 2019 Development Tour |
| 97 | Ireland | Ciarán Teehan | £0 | 2019 Development Tour |
| 98 | Austria | Harald Leitinger | £0 | 2020 Q-School |
| 99 | England | Jason Lowe | £0 | 2020 Q-School |
| 100 | England | Gary Blades | £0 | 2020 Q-School |
| 101 | Belgium | Mike De Decker | £0 | 2020 Q-School |
| 102 | Hong Kong | Kai Fan Leung | £0 | 2020 Q-School |
| 103 | England | Bradley Brooks | £0 | 2020 Q-School |
| 104 | Czech Republic | Karel Sedláček | £0 | 2020 Q-School |
| 105 | Canada | Jeff Smith | £0 | 2020 Q-School |
| 106 | England | Aaron Beeney | £0 | 2020 Q-School |
| 107 | Germany | Steffen Siepmann | £0 | 2020 Q-School |
| 108 | Wales | Nick Kenny | £0 | 2020 Q-School |
| 109 | England | Scott Waites | £0 | 2020 Q-School |
| 110 | Netherlands | Dirk van Duijvenbode | £0 | 2020 Q-School |
| 111 | Netherlands | Wesley Harms | £0 | 2020 Q-School |
| 112 | Netherlands | Derk Telnekes | £0 | 2020 Q-School |
| 113 | Netherlands | Martijn Kleermaker | £0 | 2020 Q-School |
| 114 | Sweden | Daniel Larsson | £0 | 2020 Q-School |
| 115 | Croatia | Boris Krčmar | £0 | 2020 Q-School |
| 116 | Poland | Krzysztof Kciuk | £0 | 2020 Q-School |
| 117 | Scotland | Ryan Murray | £0 | 2020 Q-School |
| 118 | England | Adam Hunt | £0 | 2020 Q-School |
| 119 | England | Peter Jacques | £0 | 2020 Q-School |
| 120 | Australia | Damon Heta | £0 | 2020 Q-School |
| 121 | England | Andy Hamilton | £0 | 2020 Q-School |
| 122 | England | Alan Tabern | £0 | 2020 Q-School |
| 123 | Scotland | William Borland | £0 | 2020 Q-School |
| 124 | England | Martin Atkins | £0 | 2020 Q-School |
| 125 | England | Wayne Jones | £0 | 2020 Q-School |
| 126 | England | Steve Brown | £0 | 2020 Q-School |
| 127 | England | Darren Penhall | £0 | 2020 Q-School |
| 128 | England | Lisa Ashton | £0 | 2020 Q-School |

== Tour Cards per Nations ==
| Nr. | Nation | Number of Players | Difference to prior Year |
|---|---|---|---|
| 1. | England | 60 | −1 |
| 2. | Netherlands | 19 | −1 |
| 3. | Scotland | 6 | ±0 |
| 3. | Wales | 6 | −1 |
| 5. | Germany | 5 | ±0 |
| 6. | Northern Ireland | 4 | −1 |
| 7. | Australia | 3 | ±0 |
| 7. | Belgium | 3 | −1 |
| 7. | Ireland | 3 | +1 |
| 7. | Austria | 3 | ±0 |
| 7. | Spain | 3 | ±0 |
| 12. | Poland | 2 | ±0 |
| 13. | Finland | 1 | ±0 |
| 13. | Greece | 1 | ±0 |
| 13. | Hong Kong | 1 | +1 |
| 13. | Canada | 1 | ±0 |
| 13. | Croatia | 1 | +1 |
| 13. | Latvia | 1 | ±0 |
| 13. | Lithuania | 1 | ±0 |
| 13. | Portugal | 1 | ±0 |
| 13. | Sweden | 1 | +1 |
| 13. | South Africa | 1 | ±0 |
| 13. | Czech Republic | 1 | +1 |
| | 23 Nations | 128 | |

== See also ==
- List of darts players
- List of darts players who have switched organisation
