= Carl Wilkinson =

Carl Wilkinson may refer to:

- Carl Wilkinson (darts player), English darts player
- Carl Wilkinson (speedway rider), English speedway rider
