= 2019 Gibraltar Darts Trophy =

Tournament information
- Dates: 27–29 September 2019
- Venue: Victoria Stadium
- Location: Gibraltar
- Country: Gibraltar
- Organisation(s): PDC
- Format: Legs
- Prize fund: £140,000
- Winner's share: £25,000
- Nine-dart finish: (England) Dave Chisnall
- High checkout: 164 (England) Nathan Aspinall

Champion(s)
- (Poland) Krzysztof Ratajski

The 2019 Gibraltar Darts Trophy is the thirteenth of thirteen PDC European Tour events on the 2019 PDC Pro Tour. The tournament is taking place at the Victoria Stadium, Gibraltar, from 27 to 29 September 2019. It features a field of 48 players and £140,000 in prize money, with £25,000 going to the winner.

Michael van Gerwen was the defending champion after defeating Adrian Lewis 8–3 in the previous year's final, but he lost in the third round 6–3 to Nathan Aspinall.

Dave Chisnall hit his first European Tour nine-dart finish in his quarter-final against James Wade, which was the fifth European Tour nine-darter of 2019, equalling the record set in the inaugural year in 2012.

Krzysztof Ratajski won his sixth PDC title, and his first on the European Tour, with an 8–2 win against Chisnall in the final.

== Prize money ==
This is how the prize money is divided:

Stage (num. of players)		Prize money
Winner	(1)	£25,000
Runner-up	(1)	£10,000
Semi-finalists	(2)	£6,500
Quarter-finalists	(4)	£5,000
Third round losers	(8)	£3,000
Second round losers	(16)	£2,000*
First round losers	(16)	£1,000
Total	£140,000	

- Seeded players who lose in the second round do not receive this prize money on any Orders of Merit.

== Qualification and format ==
The top 16 entrants from the PDC ProTour Order of Merit on 10 September will automatically qualify for the event and will be seeded in the second round.

The remaining 32 places will go to players from six qualifying events – 18 from the UK Tour Card Holder Qualifier (held on 20 September), six from the European Tour Card Holder Qualifier (held on 20 September), two from the West & South European Associate Member Qualifier (held on 12 September), four from the Host Nation Qualifier (held on 26 September), one from the Nordic & Baltic Qualifier (held on 24 August), and one from the East European Qualifier (held on 25 August).

From 2019, the Host Nation, Nordic & Baltic and East European Qualifiers will only be available to non-Tour Card holders. Any Tour Card holders from the applicable regions will have to play the main European Qualifier.

The following players will take part in the tournament:

Top 16

1. (Netherlands) Michael van Gerwen (third round)
2. (England) Ian White (quarter-finals)
3. (Wales) Gerwyn Price (quarter-finals)
4. (England) Dave Chisnall (runner-up)
5. (England) James Wade (quarter-finals)
6. (Northern Ireland) Daryl Gurney (semi-finals)
7. (Poland) Krzysztof Ratajski (champion)
8. (Scotland) Peter Wright (quarter-finals)
9. (Austria) Mensur Suljović (third round)
10. (England) Joe Cullen (third round)
11. (England) Glen Durrant (third round)
12. (Wales) Jonny Clayton (second round)
13. (Netherlands) Jermaine Wattimena (third round)
14. (England) Rob Cross (third round)
15. (England) Michael Smith (third round)
16. (England) Nathan Aspinall (semi-finals)

UK Qualifier
- (England) Jamie Hughes (first round)
- (England) Ritchie Edhouse (second round)
- (England) Steve Beaton (second round)
- (England) Chris Dobey (second round)
- (England) Carl Wilkinson (second round)
- (England) Keegan Brown (first round)
- (England) Matt Clark (first round)
- (England) Paul Rowley (second round)
- (England) Tony Newell (first round)
- (Republic of Ireland) William O'Connor (first round)
- (England) Justin Pipe (first round)
- (England) Darren Webster (first round)
- (England) Ryan Joyce (second round)
- (England) Scott Taylor (first round)
- (England) Ryan Meikle (first round)
- (Scotland) Robert Thornton (first round)
- (England) Kirk Shepherd (first round)
- (England) Steve West (first round)

European Qualifier
- (Netherlands) Jeffrey de Zwaan (second round)
- (Netherlands) Danny Noppert (second round)
- (Belgium) Kim Huybrechts (third round)
- (Lithuania) Darius Labanauskas (first round)
- (Belgium) Dimitri Van den Bergh (second round)
- (Portugal) José de Sousa (second round)

West/South European Qualifier
- (Germany) Michael Rosenauer (second round)
- (Netherlands) Wessel Nijman (second round)

Host Nation Qualifier
- (Gibraltar) David Francis (second round)
- (Gibraltar) Antony Lopez (first round)
- (Gibraltar) Dyson Parody (second round)
- (Gibraltar) Justin Hewitt (first round)

Nordic & Baltic Qualifier
- (Norway) Cor Dekker (first round)

East European Qualifier
- (Poland) Krzysztof Kciuk (second round)

== Draw ==
First round (best of 11 legs); 27 September
(Lithuania) Darius Labanauskas 94.45	2
(Portugal) José de Sousa 103.65	6
(England) Ryan Joyce 100.77	6
(England) Matt Clark 95.51	3
(Norway) Cor Dekker 91.28	5
(Gibraltar) Dyson Parody 88.66	6
(Netherlands) Wessel Nijman 88.89	6
(England) Darren Webster 87.61	5
(England) Ryan Meikle 94.04	5
(England) Paul Rowley 92.17	6
(England) Justin Pipe 93.99	3
(Belgium) Kim Huybrechts 96.72	6
(Netherlands) Jeffrey de Zwaan 96.35	6
(England) Steve West 86.12	3
(Belgium) Dimitri Van den Bergh 93.09	6
(England) Scott Taylor 93.26	3
(Gibraltar) Antony Lopez 71.82	4
(Germany) Michael Rosenauer 76.84	6
(England) Keegan Brown 93.46	5
(Netherlands) Danny Noppert 93.19	6
(England) Steve Beaton 89.69	6
(England) Tony Newell 84.26	5
(England) Ritchie Edhouse 87.99	6
(England) Jamie Hughes 84.30	3
(England) Carl Wilkinson 76.38	6
(Gibraltar) Justin Hewitt 76.01	3
(Republic of Ireland) William O'Connor 85.80	4
(England) Chris Dobey 85.19	6
(Scotland) Robert Thornton 72.32	4
(Gibraltar) David Francis 72.64	6
(Poland) Krzysztof Kciuk 84.25	6
(England) Kirk Shepherd 75.68	3

Second round (best of 11 legs); 28 September
1	(Netherlands) Michael van Gerwen 103.51	6
(Portugal) José de Sousa 94.39	3
16	(England) Nathan Aspinall 108.14	6
(England) Ryan Joyce 100.79	4
8	(Scotland) Peter Wright 100.70	6
(Gibraltar) Dyson Parody 82.22	1
9	(Austria) Mensur Suljović 98.32	6
(Netherlands) Wessel Nijman 90.09	1
5	(England) James Wade 95.70	6
(England) Paul Rowley 93.28	2
12	(Wales) Jonny Clayton 95.20	3
(Belgium) Kim Huybrechts 93.07	6
4	(England) Dave Chisnall 103.41	6
(Netherlands) Jeffrey de Zwaan 94.80	5
13	(Netherlands) Jermaine Wattimena 94.72	6
(Belgium) Dimitri Van den Bergh 90.49	2
2	(England) Ian White 88.90	6
(Germany) Michael Rosenauer 82.94	1
15	(England) Michael Smith 85.81	6
(Netherlands) Danny Noppert 83.00	1
7	(Poland) Krzysztof Ratajski 90.53	6
(England) Steve Beaton 88.05	3
10	(England) Joe Cullen 98.46	6
(England) Ritchie Edhouse 88.51	3
6	(Northern Ireland) Daryl Gurney 97.18	6
(England) Carl Wilkinson 89.73	4
11	(England) Glen Durrant 104.09	6
(England) Chris Dobey 94.17	4
3	(Wales) Gerwyn Price 98.02	6
(Gibraltar) David Francis 76.63	0
14	(England) Rob Cross 87.14	6
(Poland) Krzysztof Kciuk 78.14	3

Third round (best of 11 legs); 29 September
1	(Netherlands) van Gerwen 101.83	3
16	(England) Aspinall 95.39	6
8	(Scotland) Wright 97.69	6
9	(Austria) Suljović 96.02	3
5	(England) Wade 102.72	6
(Belgium) Huybrechts 101.19	3
4	(England) Chisnall 101.44	6
13	(Netherlands) Wattimena 92.54	4
2	(England) White 101.35	6
15	(England) Smith 93.82	4
7	(Poland) Ratajski 93.17	6
10	(England) Cullen 85.92	3
6	(Northern Ireland) Gurney 100.78	6
11	(England) Durrant 99.64	1
3	(Wales) Price 102.97	6
14	(England) Cross 97.62	5

Quarter-finals (best of 11 legs); 29 September
16	(England) Aspinall 96.21	6
8	(Scotland) Wright 94.98	3
5	(England) Wade 94.56	4
4	(England) Chisnall 106.10	6
2	(England) White 92.51	3
7	(Poland) Ratajski 91.43	6
6	(Northern Ireland) Gurney 84.73	6
3	(Wales) Price 92.46	3

Semi-finals (best of 13 legs); 29 September
16	(England) Aspinall 98.28	6
4	(England) Chisnall 97.07	7
7	(Poland) Ratajski 109.51	7
6	(Northern Ireland) Gurney 99.30	3

Final (best of 15 legs); 29 September
4	(England) Chisnall 99.96	2
7	(Poland) Ratajski 102.85	8
