= 2020 Grand Slam of Darts =

2020 BoyleSports Grand Slam of Darts

Tournament information
- Dates: 16–24 November 2020
- Venue: Coventry Arena
- Location: Coventry, England
- Organisation(s): Professional Darts Corporation (PDC)
- Format: Legs
- Prize fund: £550,000
- Winner's share: £125,000
- High checkout: 164 Joe Cullen

Champion(s)
- José de Sousa (POR)

The 2020 BoyleSports Grand Slam of Darts was the fourteenth staging of the Grand Slam of Darts, organised by the Professional Darts Corporation. The event took place, behind closed doors, from 16 to 24 November 2020 at the Coventry Arena, Coventry.

The tournament's two-time defending champion was Gerwyn Price, who successfully defended his 2018 title by defeating Peter Wright 16–6 in 2019. Price's title defence came to an end when, after surviving a match dart from Ryan Joyce to progress through the group stage, he eventually lost 10–8 to Nathan Aspinall in the last 16. José de Sousa became the first Portuguese darts player to win a televised title by beating James Wade 16–12 in the final; he also became the first debutant since the tournament's inception to win the title, as well as the first to win the title, without finishing top in the group phase.

Dimitri Van den Bergh broke the record for the highest individual average for this tournament when he beat Ricky Evans 5–1 in the group stage, averaging 114.85, beating Phil Taylor's previous record of 114.65 set in the 2014 tournament. Additionally, Simon Whitlock broke Adrian Lewis' record of hitting the most 180s in a Grand Slam match by scoring 20 maximums in his quarter-final victory over Michael van Gerwen.

== Prize money ==
The prize fund for the Grand Slam was the same as 2019, with the winner getting £125,000.

| Position (num. of players) | | Prize money (Total: £550,000) |
|---|---|---|
| Winner | (1) | £125,000 |
| Runner-up | (1) | £65,000 |
| Semi-finalists | (2) | £40,000 |
| Quarter-finalists | (4) | £20,000 |
| Last 16 | (8) | £10,000 |
| Third in group | (8) | £7,500 |
| Fourth in group | (8) | £4,000 |
| Group winner bonus | (8) | £3,500 |

== Qualifying ==
The qualification criteria were changed from 2019, with the number of entrants from the British Darts Organisation being reduced from eight to two, with a corresponding increase in PDC players. The winner of the 2020 PDC Home Tour was invited, as were the top players from the PDC's Summer, Autumn and Winter Series events and the winner of the new women's qualifier. The Champions League of Darts was not held in 2020 due to the COVID-19 pandemic.

The qualifiers are:

=== PDC Qualifying Tournaments ===
PDC Main Tournaments
| Tournament | Year | Position | Player | Qualifiers |
|---|---|---|---|---|
| PDC World Darts Championship | 2020 | Winner | (Scotland) Peter Wright | (Scotland) Peter Wright (Wales) Gerwyn Price (England) Glen Durrant (Belgium) Dimitri Van den Bergh (England) Luke Humphries (Netherlands) Michael van Gerwen (Wales) Jonny Clayton (England) Nathan Aspinall (England) James Wade (Australia) Damon Heta (Netherlands) Jermaine Wattimena (England) Lisa Ashton (Scotland) Gary Anderson (Netherlands) Dirk van Duijvenbode (Czech Republic) Adam Gawlas (England) Michael Smith (England) Rob Cross |
| Grand Slam of Darts | 2019 | Winner | (Wales) Gerwyn Price | (Scotland) Peter Wright (Wales) Gerwyn Price (England) Glen Durrant (Belgium) Dimitri Van den Bergh (England) Luke Humphries (Netherlands) Michael van Gerwen (Wales) Jonny Clayton (England) Nathan Aspinall (England) James Wade (Australia) Damon Heta (Netherlands) Jermaine Wattimena (England) Lisa Ashton (Scotland) Gary Anderson (Netherlands) Dirk van Duijvenbode (Czech Republic) Adam Gawlas (England) Michael Smith (England) Rob Cross |
| Premier League Darts | 2020 | Winner | (England) Glen Durrant | (Scotland) Peter Wright (Wales) Gerwyn Price (England) Glen Durrant (Belgium) Dimitri Van den Bergh (England) Luke Humphries (Netherlands) Michael van Gerwen (Wales) Jonny Clayton (England) Nathan Aspinall (England) James Wade (Australia) Damon Heta (Netherlands) Jermaine Wattimena (England) Lisa Ashton (Scotland) Gary Anderson (Netherlands) Dirk van Duijvenbode (Czech Republic) Adam Gawlas (England) Michael Smith (England) Rob Cross |
| World Matchplay | 2020 | Winner | (Belgium) Dimitri Van den Bergh | (Scotland) Peter Wright (Wales) Gerwyn Price (England) Glen Durrant (Belgium) Dimitri Van den Bergh (England) Luke Humphries (Netherlands) Michael van Gerwen (Wales) Jonny Clayton (England) Nathan Aspinall (England) James Wade (Australia) Damon Heta (Netherlands) Jermaine Wattimena (England) Lisa Ashton (Scotland) Gary Anderson (Netherlands) Dirk van Duijvenbode (Czech Republic) Adam Gawlas (England) Michael Smith (England) Rob Cross |
| World Grand Prix | 2020 | Winner | (Wales) Gerwyn Price | (Scotland) Peter Wright (Wales) Gerwyn Price (England) Glen Durrant (Belgium) Dimitri Van den Bergh (England) Luke Humphries (Netherlands) Michael van Gerwen (Wales) Jonny Clayton (England) Nathan Aspinall (England) James Wade (Australia) Damon Heta (Netherlands) Jermaine Wattimena (England) Lisa Ashton (Scotland) Gary Anderson (Netherlands) Dirk van Duijvenbode (Czech Republic) Adam Gawlas (England) Michael Smith (England) Rob Cross |
| PDC World Youth Championship | 2019 | Winner | (England) Luke Humphries | (Scotland) Peter Wright (Wales) Gerwyn Price (England) Glen Durrant (Belgium) Dimitri Van den Bergh (England) Luke Humphries (Netherlands) Michael van Gerwen (Wales) Jonny Clayton (England) Nathan Aspinall (England) James Wade (Australia) Damon Heta (Netherlands) Jermaine Wattimena (England) Lisa Ashton (Scotland) Gary Anderson (Netherlands) Dirk van Duijvenbode (Czech Republic) Adam Gawlas (England) Michael Smith (England) Rob Cross |
| Masters | 2020 | Winner | (Scotland) Peter Wright | (Scotland) Peter Wright (Wales) Gerwyn Price (England) Glen Durrant (Belgium) Dimitri Van den Bergh (England) Luke Humphries (Netherlands) Michael van Gerwen (Wales) Jonny Clayton (England) Nathan Aspinall (England) James Wade (Australia) Damon Heta (Netherlands) Jermaine Wattimena (England) Lisa Ashton (Scotland) Gary Anderson (Netherlands) Dirk van Duijvenbode (Czech Republic) Adam Gawlas (England) Michael Smith (England) Rob Cross |
| UK Open | 2020 | Winner | (Netherlands) Michael van Gerwen | (Scotland) Peter Wright (Wales) Gerwyn Price (England) Glen Durrant (Belgium) Dimitri Van den Bergh (England) Luke Humphries (Netherlands) Michael van Gerwen (Wales) Jonny Clayton (England) Nathan Aspinall (England) James Wade (Australia) Damon Heta (Netherlands) Jermaine Wattimena (England) Lisa Ashton (Scotland) Gary Anderson (Netherlands) Dirk van Duijvenbode (Czech Republic) Adam Gawlas (England) Michael Smith (England) Rob Cross |
| European Championship | 2020 | Winner | (Scotland) Peter Wright | (Scotland) Peter Wright (Wales) Gerwyn Price (England) Glen Durrant (Belgium) Dimitri Van den Bergh (England) Luke Humphries (Netherlands) Michael van Gerwen (Wales) Jonny Clayton (England) Nathan Aspinall (England) James Wade (Australia) Damon Heta (Netherlands) Jermaine Wattimena (England) Lisa Ashton (Scotland) Gary Anderson (Netherlands) Dirk van Duijvenbode (Czech Republic) Adam Gawlas (England) Michael Smith (England) Rob Cross |
| Players Championship Finals | 2019 | Winner | (Netherlands) Michael van Gerwen | (Scotland) Peter Wright (Wales) Gerwyn Price (England) Glen Durrant (Belgium) Dimitri Van den Bergh (England) Luke Humphries (Netherlands) Michael van Gerwen (Wales) Jonny Clayton (England) Nathan Aspinall (England) James Wade (Australia) Damon Heta (Netherlands) Jermaine Wattimena (England) Lisa Ashton (Scotland) Gary Anderson (Netherlands) Dirk van Duijvenbode (Czech Republic) Adam Gawlas (England) Michael Smith (England) Rob Cross |
| World Series of Darts Finals | 2020 | Winner | (Wales) Gerwyn Price | (Scotland) Peter Wright (Wales) Gerwyn Price (England) Glen Durrant (Belgium) Dimitri Van den Bergh (England) Luke Humphries (Netherlands) Michael van Gerwen (Wales) Jonny Clayton (England) Nathan Aspinall (England) James Wade (Australia) Damon Heta (Netherlands) Jermaine Wattimena (England) Lisa Ashton (Scotland) Gary Anderson (Netherlands) Dirk van Duijvenbode (Czech Republic) Adam Gawlas (England) Michael Smith (England) Rob Cross |
| PDC World Cup of Darts | 2020 | Winners | (Wales) Gerwyn Price (Wales) Jonny Clayton | (Scotland) Peter Wright (Wales) Gerwyn Price (England) Glen Durrant (Belgium) Dimitri Van den Bergh (England) Luke Humphries (Netherlands) Michael van Gerwen (Wales) Jonny Clayton (England) Nathan Aspinall (England) James Wade (Australia) Damon Heta (Netherlands) Jermaine Wattimena (England) Lisa Ashton (Scotland) Gary Anderson (Netherlands) Dirk van Duijvenbode (Czech Republic) Adam Gawlas (England) Michael Smith (England) Rob Cross |
| PDC Home Tour | 2020 | Winner | (England) Nathan Aspinall | (Scotland) Peter Wright (Wales) Gerwyn Price (England) Glen Durrant (Belgium) Dimitri Van den Bergh (England) Luke Humphries (Netherlands) Michael van Gerwen (Wales) Jonny Clayton (England) Nathan Aspinall (England) James Wade (Australia) Damon Heta (Netherlands) Jermaine Wattimena (England) Lisa Ashton (Scotland) Gary Anderson (Netherlands) Dirk van Duijvenbode (Czech Republic) Adam Gawlas (England) Michael Smith (England) Rob Cross |
| PDC Summer Series | 2020 | Highest-placed (Note: The qualifiers for the Summer, Autumn and Winter Series were the highest-ranked five day Order of Merit, not already qualified at that time.) | (England) James Wade | (Scotland) Peter Wright (Wales) Gerwyn Price (England) Glen Durrant (Belgium) Dimitri Van den Bergh (England) Luke Humphries (Netherlands) Michael van Gerwen (Wales) Jonny Clayton (England) Nathan Aspinall (England) James Wade (Australia) Damon Heta (Netherlands) Jermaine Wattimena (England) Lisa Ashton (Scotland) Gary Anderson (Netherlands) Dirk van Duijvenbode (Czech Republic) Adam Gawlas (England) Michael Smith (England) Rob Cross |
| PDC Autumn Series | 2020 | Highest-placed | (Australia) Damon Heta | (Scotland) Peter Wright (Wales) Gerwyn Price (England) Glen Durrant (Belgium) Dimitri Van den Bergh (England) Luke Humphries (Netherlands) Michael van Gerwen (Wales) Jonny Clayton (England) Nathan Aspinall (England) James Wade (Australia) Damon Heta (Netherlands) Jermaine Wattimena (England) Lisa Ashton (Scotland) Gary Anderson (Netherlands) Dirk van Duijvenbode (Czech Republic) Adam Gawlas (England) Michael Smith (England) Rob Cross |
| PDC Winter Series | 2020 | Highest-placed | (Netherlands) Jermaine Wattimena | (Scotland) Peter Wright (Wales) Gerwyn Price (England) Glen Durrant (Belgium) Dimitri Van den Bergh (England) Luke Humphries (Netherlands) Michael van Gerwen (Wales) Jonny Clayton (England) Nathan Aspinall (England) James Wade (Australia) Damon Heta (Netherlands) Jermaine Wattimena (England) Lisa Ashton (Scotland) Gary Anderson (Netherlands) Dirk van Duijvenbode (Czech Republic) Adam Gawlas (England) Michael Smith (England) Rob Cross |
| PDC Women's Qualifier | 2020 | Winner | (England) Lisa Ashton | (Scotland) Peter Wright (Wales) Gerwyn Price (England) Glen Durrant (Belgium) Dimitri Van den Bergh (England) Luke Humphries (Netherlands) Michael van Gerwen (Wales) Jonny Clayton (England) Nathan Aspinall (England) James Wade (Australia) Damon Heta (Netherlands) Jermaine Wattimena (England) Lisa Ashton (Scotland) Gary Anderson (Netherlands) Dirk van Duijvenbode (Czech Republic) Adam Gawlas (England) Michael Smith (England) Rob Cross |
| PDC World Darts Championship | 2020 | Runner-up | (Netherlands) Michael van Gerwen | (Scotland) Peter Wright (Wales) Gerwyn Price (England) Glen Durrant (Belgium) Dimitri Van den Bergh (England) Luke Humphries (Netherlands) Michael van Gerwen (Wales) Jonny Clayton (England) Nathan Aspinall (England) James Wade (Australia) Damon Heta (Netherlands) Jermaine Wattimena (England) Lisa Ashton (Scotland) Gary Anderson (Netherlands) Dirk van Duijvenbode (Czech Republic) Adam Gawlas (England) Michael Smith (England) Rob Cross |
| Grand Slam of Darts | 2019 | Runner-up | (Scotland) Peter Wright | (Scotland) Peter Wright (Wales) Gerwyn Price (England) Glen Durrant (Belgium) Dimitri Van den Bergh (England) Luke Humphries (Netherlands) Michael van Gerwen (Wales) Jonny Clayton (England) Nathan Aspinall (England) James Wade (Australia) Damon Heta (Netherlands) Jermaine Wattimena (England) Lisa Ashton (Scotland) Gary Anderson (Netherlands) Dirk van Duijvenbode (Czech Republic) Adam Gawlas (England) Michael Smith (England) Rob Cross |
| Premier League Darts | 2020 | Runner-up | (England) Nathan Aspinall | (Scotland) Peter Wright (Wales) Gerwyn Price (England) Glen Durrant (Belgium) Dimitri Van den Bergh (England) Luke Humphries (Netherlands) Michael van Gerwen (Wales) Jonny Clayton (England) Nathan Aspinall (England) James Wade (Australia) Damon Heta (Netherlands) Jermaine Wattimena (England) Lisa Ashton (Scotland) Gary Anderson (Netherlands) Dirk van Duijvenbode (Czech Republic) Adam Gawlas (England) Michael Smith (England) Rob Cross |
| World Matchplay | 2020 | Runner-up | (Scotland) Gary Anderson | (Scotland) Peter Wright (Wales) Gerwyn Price (England) Glen Durrant (Belgium) Dimitri Van den Bergh (England) Luke Humphries (Netherlands) Michael van Gerwen (Wales) Jonny Clayton (England) Nathan Aspinall (England) James Wade (Australia) Damon Heta (Netherlands) Jermaine Wattimena (England) Lisa Ashton (Scotland) Gary Anderson (Netherlands) Dirk van Duijvenbode (Czech Republic) Adam Gawlas (England) Michael Smith (England) Rob Cross |
| World Grand Prix | 2020 | Runner-up | (Netherlands) Dirk van Duijvenbode | (Scotland) Peter Wright (Wales) Gerwyn Price (England) Glen Durrant (Belgium) Dimitri Van den Bergh (England) Luke Humphries (Netherlands) Michael van Gerwen (Wales) Jonny Clayton (England) Nathan Aspinall (England) James Wade (Australia) Damon Heta (Netherlands) Jermaine Wattimena (England) Lisa Ashton (Scotland) Gary Anderson (Netherlands) Dirk van Duijvenbode (Czech Republic) Adam Gawlas (England) Michael Smith (England) Rob Cross |
| PDC World Youth Championship | 2019 | Runner-up | (Czech Republic) Adam Gawlas | (Scotland) Peter Wright (Wales) Gerwyn Price (England) Glen Durrant (Belgium) Dimitri Van den Bergh (England) Luke Humphries (Netherlands) Michael van Gerwen (Wales) Jonny Clayton (England) Nathan Aspinall (England) James Wade (Australia) Damon Heta (Netherlands) Jermaine Wattimena (England) Lisa Ashton (Scotland) Gary Anderson (Netherlands) Dirk van Duijvenbode (Czech Republic) Adam Gawlas (England) Michael Smith (England) Rob Cross |
| Masters | 2020 | Runner-up | (England) Michael Smith | (Scotland) Peter Wright (Wales) Gerwyn Price (England) Glen Durrant (Belgium) Dimitri Van den Bergh (England) Luke Humphries (Netherlands) Michael van Gerwen (Wales) Jonny Clayton (England) Nathan Aspinall (England) James Wade (Australia) Damon Heta (Netherlands) Jermaine Wattimena (England) Lisa Ashton (Scotland) Gary Anderson (Netherlands) Dirk van Duijvenbode (Czech Republic) Adam Gawlas (England) Michael Smith (England) Rob Cross |
| UK Open | 2020 | Runner-up | (Wales) Gerwyn Price | (Scotland) Peter Wright (Wales) Gerwyn Price (England) Glen Durrant (Belgium) Dimitri Van den Bergh (England) Luke Humphries (Netherlands) Michael van Gerwen (Wales) Jonny Clayton (England) Nathan Aspinall (England) James Wade (Australia) Damon Heta (Netherlands) Jermaine Wattimena (England) Lisa Ashton (Scotland) Gary Anderson (Netherlands) Dirk van Duijvenbode (Czech Republic) Adam Gawlas (England) Michael Smith (England) Rob Cross |
| European Championship | 2020 | Runner-up | (England) James Wade | (Scotland) Peter Wright (Wales) Gerwyn Price (England) Glen Durrant (Belgium) Dimitri Van den Bergh (England) Luke Humphries (Netherlands) Michael van Gerwen (Wales) Jonny Clayton (England) Nathan Aspinall (England) James Wade (Australia) Damon Heta (Netherlands) Jermaine Wattimena (England) Lisa Ashton (Scotland) Gary Anderson (Netherlands) Dirk van Duijvenbode (Czech Republic) Adam Gawlas (England) Michael Smith (England) Rob Cross |
| Players Championship Finals | 2019 | Runner-up | (Wales) Gerwyn Price | (Scotland) Peter Wright (Wales) Gerwyn Price (England) Glen Durrant (Belgium) Dimitri Van den Bergh (England) Luke Humphries (Netherlands) Michael van Gerwen (Wales) Jonny Clayton (England) Nathan Aspinall (England) James Wade (Australia) Damon Heta (Netherlands) Jermaine Wattimena (England) Lisa Ashton (Scotland) Gary Anderson (Netherlands) Dirk van Duijvenbode (Czech Republic) Adam Gawlas (England) Michael Smith (England) Rob Cross |
| World Series of Darts Finals | 2020 | Runner-up | (England) Rob Cross | (Scotland) Peter Wright (Wales) Gerwyn Price (England) Glen Durrant (Belgium) Dimitri Van den Bergh (England) Luke Humphries (Netherlands) Michael van Gerwen (Wales) Jonny Clayton (England) Nathan Aspinall (England) James Wade (Australia) Damon Heta (Netherlands) Jermaine Wattimena (England) Lisa Ashton (Scotland) Gary Anderson (Netherlands) Dirk van Duijvenbode (Czech Republic) Adam Gawlas (England) Michael Smith (England) Rob Cross |
| PDC World Cup of Darts | 2020 | Runners-Up | (England) Michael Smith (England) Rob Cross | (Scotland) Peter Wright (Wales) Gerwyn Price (England) Glen Durrant (Belgium) Dimitri Van den Bergh (England) Luke Humphries (Netherlands) Michael van Gerwen (Wales) Jonny Clayton (England) Nathan Aspinall (England) James Wade (Australia) Damon Heta (Netherlands) Jermaine Wattimena (England) Lisa Ashton (Scotland) Gary Anderson (Netherlands) Dirk van Duijvenbode (Czech Republic) Adam Gawlas (England) Michael Smith (England) Rob Cross |
| Note: Players in italics had already qualified for the tournament. | | | | (Scotland) Peter Wright (Wales) Gerwyn Price (England) Glen Durrant (Belgium) Dimitri Van den Bergh (England) Luke Humphries (Netherlands) Michael van Gerwen (Wales) Jonny Clayton (England) Nathan Aspinall (England) James Wade (Australia) Damon Heta (Netherlands) Jermaine Wattimena (England) Lisa Ashton (Scotland) Gary Anderson (Netherlands) Dirk van Duijvenbode (Czech Republic) Adam Gawlas (England) Michael Smith (England) Rob Cross |

At most twenty-two players could have qualified through this method, where the position in the list depicts the priority of the qualification.

Since the list of qualifiers from the main tournaments produced fewer than twenty-two players, the field of twenty-two players was filled from the reserve lists. The first list consisted of the winners from 2020 European Tour events, in which the winners were ordered by Order of Merit position order at the cut-off date.

PDC European Tour
| Tournament | Event | Position | Player | Qualifiers |
|---|---|---|---|---|
2020 European Tour
| 2020 European Tour | Belgian Darts Championship | Winner | (Wales) Gerwyn Price | (England) Joe Cullen (South Africa) Devon Petersen (Portugal) José de Sousa |
| 2020 European Tour | German Darts Championship | Winner | (South Africa) Devon Petersen | (England) Joe Cullen (South Africa) Devon Petersen (Portugal) José de Sousa |
| 2020 European Tour | European Darts Grand Prix | Winner | (Portugal) José de Sousa | (England) Joe Cullen (South Africa) Devon Petersen (Portugal) José de Sousa |
| 2020 European Tour | International Darts Open | Winner | (England) Joe Cullen | (England) Joe Cullen (South Africa) Devon Petersen (Portugal) José de Sousa |
| Note: Players in italics had already qualified for the tournament. | | | | (England) Joe Cullen (South Africa) Devon Petersen (Portugal) José de Sousa |

Since there were still less than twenty-two qualified players after the winners of European Tour events were added, the winners of 2020 Players Championships events were added, in Order of Merit order.

PDC Pro Tour
| Tournament | Event | Position | Player | Qualifiers |
|---|---|---|---|---|
2020 PDC Pro Tour
| 2020 PDC Pro Tour | Players Championship 1 | Winner | (Scotland) Gary Anderson | (England) Ian White (England) Ryan Searle |
| 2020 PDC Pro Tour | Players Championship 2 | Winner | (England) Nathan Aspinall | (England) Ian White (England) Ryan Searle |
| 2020 PDC Pro Tour | Players Championship 3 | Winner | (England) Ryan Searle | (England) Ian White (England) Ryan Searle |
| 2020 PDC Pro Tour | Players Championship 4 | Winner | (Poland) Krzysztof Ratajski (Note: Ratajski qualified via the Grand Slam qualifier before the conclusion of the Players Championship events.) | (England) Ian White (England) Ryan Searle |
| 2020 PDC Pro Tour | Players Championship 5 | Winner | (Scotland) Peter Wright | (England) Ian White (England) Ryan Searle |
| 2020 PDC Pro Tour | Players Championship 6 | Winner | (Wales) Gerwyn Price | (England) Ian White (England) Ryan Searle |
| 2020 PDC Pro Tour | Players Championship 7 | Winner | (England) Nathan Aspinall | (England) Ian White (England) Ryan Searle |
| 2020 PDC Pro Tour | Players Championship 8 | Winner | (England) Ian White | (England) Ian White (England) Ryan Searle |
| 2020 PDC Pro Tour | Players Championship 9 | Winner | (Netherlands) Michael van Gerwen | (England) Ian White (England) Ryan Searle |
| 2020 PDC Pro Tour | Players Championship 10 | Winner | (England) Ryan Joyce (Note: Joyce qualified via the Grand Slam qualifier before the conclusion of the Players Championship events.) | (England) Ian White (England) Ryan Searle |
| 2020 PDC Pro Tour | Players Championship 11 | Winner | (Netherlands) Michael van Gerwen | (England) Ian White (England) Ryan Searle |
| 2020 PDC Pro Tour | Players Championship 12 | Winner | (England) James Wade | (England) Ian White (England) Ryan Searle |
| 2020 PDC Pro Tour | Players Championship 13 | Winner | (Scotland) Peter Wright | (England) Ian White (England) Ryan Searle |
| 2020 PDC Pro Tour | Players Championship 14 | Winner | (Scotland) Peter Wright | (England) Ian White (England) Ryan Searle |
| 2020 PDC Pro Tour | Players Championship 15 | Winner | (Australia) Damon Heta | (England) Ian White (England) Ryan Searle |
| 2020 PDC Pro Tour | Players Championship 16 | Winner | (Netherlands) Michael van Gerwen | (England) Ian White (England) Ryan Searle |
| 2020 PDC Pro Tour | Players Championship 17 | Winner | (Wales) Gerwyn Price | (England) Ian White (England) Ryan Searle |
| 2020 PDC Pro Tour | Players Championship 18 | Winner | (Wales) Gerwyn Price | (England) Ian White (England) Ryan Searle |
| 2020 PDC Pro Tour | Players Championship 19 | Winner | (England) Michael Smith | (England) Ian White (England) Ryan Searle |
| 2020 PDC Pro Tour | Players Championship 20 | Winner | (England) Michael Smith | (England) Ian White (England) Ryan Searle |
| 2020 PDC Pro Tour | Players Championship 21 | Winner | (Wales) Gerwyn Price | (England) Ian White (England) Ryan Searle |
| 2020 PDC Pro Tour | Players Championship 22 | Winner | (Scotland) Peter Wright | (England) Ian White (England) Ryan Searle |
| 2020 PDC Pro Tour | Players Championship 23 | Winner | (England) Joe Cullen | (England) Ian White (England) Ryan Searle |
| Note: Players in italics had already qualified for the tournament. | | | | (England) Ian White (England) Ryan Searle |

=== PDC Qualifying Event ===
A further eight places in the Grand Slam of Darts were filled by qualifiers from a PDC qualifier on 9 November. These are the qualifiers:

- (England) Ricky Evans
- (England) Adam Hunt
- (Poland) Krzysztof Ratajski
- (England) Ryan Joyce
- (England) Dave Chisnall
- (Australia) Simon Whitlock
- (England) Justin Pipe
- (Germany) Gabriel Clemens

=== BDO Invitees ===
The two BDO world champions were invited.

| Tournament | Year | Position | Player |
|---|---|---|---|
| BDO World Darts Championship | 2020 | Men's Winner | (Wales) Wayne Warren |
| BDO World Darts Championship | 2020 | Women's Winner | (Japan) Mikuru Suzuki |

== Pools ==
| Pool A | Pool B | Pool C | Pool D |
| (PDC Seeded Players) | (PDC Qualifiers & BDO Representatives) | | |
|---|---|---|---|
| (Netherlands) Michael van Gerwen (1) (Scotland) Peter Wright (2) (Wales) Gerwyn Price (3) (England) Michael Smith (4) (England) Rob Cross (5) (England) Nathan Aspinall (6) (England) James Wade (7) (Scotland) Gary Anderson (8) | (England) Dave Chisnall (Belgium) Dimitri Van den Bergh (England) Ian White (England) Glen Durrant (Poland) Krzysztof Ratajski (Wales) Jonny Clayton (England) Joe Cullen (Australia) Simon Whitlock | (Netherlands) Jermaine Wattimena (England) Ricky Evans (Germany) Gabriel Clemens (South Africa) Devon Petersen (Portugal) José de Sousa (England) Luke Humphries (England) Ryan Joyce (England) Ryan Searle | (Netherlands) Dirk van Duijvenbode (England) Justin Pipe (Australia) Damon Heta (England) Adam Hunt (England) Lisa Ashton (Czech Republic) Adam Gawlas (Wales) Wayne Warren (BDO) (Japan) Mikuru Suzuki (BDO) |

== Draw ==
=== Group stage ===
All group matches are best of nine legs
After three games, the top two in each group qualify for the knock-out stage

NB: P = Played; W = Won; L = Lost; LF = Legs for; LA = Legs against; +/− = Plus/minus record, in relation to legs; Pts = Points; Status = Qualified to knockout stage

==== Group A ====
| Pos. | Player | P | W | L | LF | LA | +/− | Pts | Status |
|---|---|---|---|---|---|---|---|---|---|
| 1 | (Netherlands) Michael van Gerwen (1) | 3 | 3 | 0 | 15 | 4 | +11 | 6 | Q |
| 2 | (England) Adam Hunt (Q) | 3 | 1 | 2 | 9 | 12 | −3 | 2 | Q |
| 3 | (Germany) Gabriel Clemens (Q) | 3 | 1 | 2 | 8 | 12 | −4 | 2 | Eliminated |
| 4 | (England) Joe Cullen | 3 | 1 | 2 | 10 | 14 | −4 | 2 | Eliminated |

16 November

| 99.28 Joe Cullen (England) | 2 – 5 | (Germany) Gabriel Clemens 99.91 |
| 105.85 Michael van Gerwen (Netherlands) | 5 – 0 | (England) Adam Hunt 88.14 |

17 November

| 95.01 Joe Cullen (England) | 5 – 4 | (England) Adam Hunt 91.72 |
| 103.60 Michael van Gerwen (Netherlands) | 5 – 1 | (Germany) Gabriel Clemens 92.86 |

19 November

| 91.83 Gabriel Clemens (Germany) | 2 – 5 | (England) Adam Hunt 95.09 |
| 92.80 Michael van Gerwen (Netherlands) | 5 – 3 | (England) Joe Cullen 91.73 |

==== Group B ====
| Pos. | Player | P | W | L | LF | LA | +/− | Pts | Status |
|---|---|---|---|---|---|---|---|---|---|
| 1 | (Australia) Simon Whitlock (Q) | 3 | 3 | 0 | 15 | 8 | +7 | 6 | Q |
| 2 | (Scotland) Gary Anderson (8) | 3 | 2 | 1 | 11 | 11 | 0 | 4 | Q |
| 3 | (England) Ryan Searle | 3 | 1 | 2 | 11 | 14 | −3 | 2 | Eliminated |
| 4 | (Czech Republic) Adam Gawlas | 3 | 0 | 3 | 11 | 15 | −4 | 0 | Eliminated |

16 November

| 93.77 Simon Whitlock (Australia) | 5 – 3 | (England) Ryan Searle 96.18 |
| 83.59 Gary Anderson (Scotland) | 5 – 3 | (Czech Republic) Adam Gawlas 88.31 |

17 November

| 99.67 Ryan Searle (England) | 5 – 4 | (Czech Republic) Adam Gawlas 95.16 |
| 90.50 Gary Anderson (Scotland) | 1 – 5 | (Australia) Simon Whitlock 94.77 |

18 November

| 96.09 Simon Whitlock (Australia) | 5 – 4 | (Czech Republic) Adam Gawlas 90.11 |
| 99.85 Gary Anderson (Scotland) | 5 – 3 | (England) Ryan Searle 102.06 |

==== Group C ====
| Pos. | Player | P | W | L | LF | LA | +/− | Pts | Status |
|---|---|---|---|---|---|---|---|---|---|
| 1 | (England) Michael Smith (4) | 3 | 3 | 0 | 15 | 5 | +10 | 6 | Q |
| 2 | (Portugal) José de Sousa | 3 | 2 | 1 | 12 | 10 | +2 | 4 | Q |
| 3 | (Poland) Krzysztof Ratajski (Q) | 3 | 1 | 2 | 11 | 14 | –3 | 2 | Eliminated |
| 4 | (England) Lisa Ashton | 3 | 0 | 3 | 6 | 15 | −9 | 0 | Eliminated |

16 November

| 94.76 Krzysztof Ratajski (Poland) | 4 – 5 | (Portugal) José de Sousa 99.69 |
| 102.51 Michael Smith (England) | 5 – 1 | (England) Lisa Ashton 87.98 |

17 November

| 104.18 Krzysztof Ratajski (Poland) | 5 – 4 | (England) Lisa Ashton 87.02 |
| 102.50 Michael Smith (England) | 5 – 2 | (Portugal) José de Sousa 99.10 |

19 November

| 100.03 José de Sousa (Portugal) | 5 – 1 | (England) Lisa Ashton 83.83 |
| 106.93 Michael Smith (England) | 5 – 2 | (Poland) Krzysztof Ratajski 94.37 |

==== Group D ====
| Pos. | Player | P | W | L | LF | LA | +/− | Pts | Status |
|---|---|---|---|---|---|---|---|---|---|
| 1 | (England) Dave Chisnall (Q) | 3 | 3 | 0 | 15 | 8 | +7 | 6 | Q |
| 2 | (England) Rob Cross (5) | 3 | 2 | 1 | 12 | 8 | +4 | 4 | Q |
| 3 | (England) Luke Humphries | 3 | 1 | 2 | 11 | 14 | −3 | 2 | Eliminated |
| 4 | (England) Justin Pipe (Q) | 3 | 0 | 3 | 7 | 15 | −8 | 0 | Eliminated |

16 November

| 94.61 Rob Cross (England) | 5 – 1 | (England) Justin Pipe 84.81 |
| 91.96 Dave Chisnall (England) | 5 – 4 | (England) Luke Humphries 97.65 |

17 November

| 87.09 Luke Humphries (England) | 5 – 4 | (England) Justin Pipe 91.51 |
| 87.78 Rob Cross (England) | 2 – 5 | (England) Dave Chisnall 96.31 |

18 November

| 85.78 Dave Chisnall (England) | 5 – 2 | (England) Justin Pipe 88.87 |
| 100.42 Rob Cross (England) | 5 – 2 | (England) Luke Humphries 102.57 |

==== Group E ====
| Pos. | Player | P | W | L | LF | LA | +/− | Pts | Status |
|---|---|---|---|---|---|---|---|---|---|
| 1 | (South Africa) Devon Petersen | 3 | 3 | 0 | 15 | 6 | +9 | 6 | Q |
| 2 | (England) Ian White | 3 | 1 | 2 | 10 | 11 | −1 | 2 | Q |
| 3 | (Scotland) Peter Wright (2) | 3 | 1 | 2 | 11 | 13 | –2 | 2 | Eliminated |
| 4 | (Netherlands) Dirk van Duijvenbode | 3 | 1 | 2 | 8 | 14 | −6 | 2 | Eliminated |

16 November

| 90.07 Peter Wright (Scotland) | 4 – 5 | (Netherlands) Dirk van Duijvenbode 92.72 |
| 88.05 Ian White (England) | 2 – 5 | (South Africa) Devon Petersen 99.55 |

17 November

| 106.80 Peter Wright (Scotland) | 5 – 3 | (England) Ian White 100.72 |
| 93.26 Devon Petersen (South Africa) | 5 – 2 | (Netherlands) Dirk van Duijvenbode 98.08 |

19 November

| 108.04 Ian White (England) | 5 – 1 | (Netherlands) Dirk van Duijvenbode 98.64 |
| 83.12 Peter Wright (Scotland) | 2 – 5 | (South Africa) Devon Petersen 88.25 |

==== Group F ====
| Pos. | Player | P | W | L | LF | LA | +/− | Pts | Status |
|---|---|---|---|---|---|---|---|---|---|
| 1 | (England) James Wade (7) | 3 | 3 | 0 | 15 | 7 | +8 | 6 | Q |
| 2 | (Australia) Damon Heta | 3 | 2 | 1 | 12 | 10 | +2 | 4 | Q |
| 3 | (Netherlands) Jermaine Wattimena | 3 | 1 | 2 | 12 | 11 | +1 | 2 | Eliminated |
| 4 | (England) Glen Durrant | 3 | 0 | 3 | 4 | 15 | −11 | 0 | Eliminated |

16 November

| 102.44 James Wade (England) | 5 – 2 | (Australia) Damon Heta 94.91 |
| 78.96 Glen Durrant (England) | 1 – 5 | (Netherlands) Jermaine Wattimena 91.04 |

17 November

| 89.76 Glen Durrant (England) | 1 – 5 | (Australia) Damon Heta 94.40 |
| 94.07 James Wade (England) | 5 – 3 | (Netherlands) Jermaine Wattimena 93.58 |

18 November

| 95.34 James Wade (England) | 5 – 2 | (England) Glen Durrant 87.95 |
| 86.14 Jermaine Wattimena (Netherlands) | 4 – 5 | (Australia) Damon Heta 86.14 |

==== Group G ====
| Pos. | Player | P | W | L | LF | LA | +/− | Pts | Status |
|---|---|---|---|---|---|---|---|---|---|
| 1 | (Wales) Gerwyn Price (3) | 3 | 3 | 0 | 15 | 11 | +4 | 6 | Q |
| 2 | (Wales) Jonny Clayton | 3 | 2 | 1 | 13 | 9 | +4 | 4 | Q |
| 3 | (England) Ryan Joyce (Q) | 3 | 1 | 2 | 13 | 11 | +2 | 2 | Eliminated |
| 4 | (Japan) Mikuru Suzuki (BDO) | 3 | 0 | 3 | 5 | 15 | −10 | 0 | Eliminated |

16 November

| 94.15 Jonny Clayton (Wales) | 5 – 4 | (England) Ryan Joyce 97.06 |
| 88.08 Gerwyn Price (Wales) | 5 – 4 | (Japan) Mikuru Suzuki 87.27 |

17 November

| 91.96 Ryan Joyce (England) | 5 – 1 | (Japan) Mikuru Suzuki 80.02 |
| 89.65 Gerwyn Price (Wales) | 5 – 3 | (Wales) Jonny Clayton 88.06 |

19 November

| 90.54 Jonny Clayton (Wales) | 5 – 0 | (Japan) Mikuru Suzuki 79.00 |
| 106.32 Gerwyn Price (Wales) | 5 – 4 | (England) Ryan Joyce 97.25 |

==== Group H ====
| Pos. | Player | P | W | L | LF | LA | +/− | Pts | Status |
|---|---|---|---|---|---|---|---|---|---|
| 1 | (Belgium) Dimitri Van den Bergh | 3 | 3 | 0 | 15 | 3 | +12 | 6 | Q |
| 2 | (England) Nathan Aspinall (6) | 3 | 2 | 1 | 11 | 6 | +5 | 4 | Q |
| 3 | (England) Ricky Evans (Q) | 3 | 1 | 2 | 7 | 13 | −6 | 2 | Eliminated |
| 4 | (Wales) Wayne Warren (BDO) | 3 | 0 | 3 | 4 | 15 | −11 | 0 | Eliminated |

16 November

| 96.35 Nathan Aspinall (England) | 5 – 0 | (Wales) Wayne Warren 70.08 |
| 114.85 Dimitri Van den Bergh (Belgium) | 5 – 1 | (England) Ricky Evans 95.80 |

17 November

| 87.51 Ricky Evans (England) | 5 – 3 | (Wales) Wayne Warren 88.70 |
| 94.40 Nathan Aspinall (England) | 1 – 5 | (Belgium) Dimitri Van den Bergh 101.03 |

18 November

| 104.33 Dimitri Van den Bergh (Belgium) | 5 – 1 | (Wales) Wayne Warren 78.82 |
| 93.28 Nathan Aspinall (England) | 5 – 1 | (England) Ricky Evans 90.35 |

=== Knockout stage ===
Second round (best of 19 legs); 20–21 November
A1 | (Netherlands) Michael van Gerwen (1) 101.81 | 10
B2 | (Scotland) Gary Anderson (8) 96.98 | 2
B1 | (Australia) Simon Whitlock (Q) 87.05 | 10
A2 | (England) Adam Hunt (Q) 86.68 | 6
C1 | (England) Michael Smith (4) 97.46 | 10
D2 | (England) Rob Cross (5) 95.18 | 9
D1 | (England) Dave Chisnall (Q) 91.28 | 7
C2 | (Portugal) José de Sousa 95.37 | 10
E1 | (South Africa) Devon Petersen 94.25 | 7
F2 | (Australia) Damon Heta 93.75 | 10
F1 | (England) James Wade (7) 98.18 | 10
E2 | (England) Ian White 99.44 | 4
G1 | (Wales) Gerwyn Price (3) 90.73 | 8
H2 | (England) Nathan Aspinall (6) 96.86 | 10
H1 | (Belgium) Dimitri Van den Bergh 103.61 | 10
G2 | (Wales) Jonny Clayton 88.53 | 3

Quarter-finals (best of 31 legs); 22 November
A1 | (Netherlands) Michael van Gerwen (1) 100.32 | 15
B1 | (Australia) Simon Whitlock (Q) 95.97 | 16
C1 | (England) Michael Smith (4) 95.74 | 14
C2 | (Portugal) José de Sousa 98.52 | 16
F2 | (Australia) Damon Heta 98.26 | 13
F1 | (England) James Wade (7) 101.66 | 16
H2 | (England) Nathan Aspinall (6) 94.92 | 15
H1 | (Belgium) Dimitri Van den Bergh 97.80 | 16

Semi-finals (best of 31 legs); 23 November
B1 | (Australia) Simon Whitlock (Q) 97.92 | 12
C2 | (Portugal) José de Sousa 97.53 | 16
F1 | (England) James Wade (7) 98.61 | 16
H1 | (Belgium) Dimitri Van den Bergh 96.87 | 15

Final (best of 31 legs); 24 November
C2 | (Portugal) José de Sousa 99.95 | 16
F1 | (England) James Wade (7) 94.26 | 12
