= 2020 International Darts Open =

2020 edition of International Darts Open

Tournament information
- Dates: 23–25 October 2020
- Venue: SACHSENarena
- Location: Riesa, Germany
- Organisation(s): Professional Darts Corporation (PDC)
- Format: Legs
- Prize fund: £140,000
- Winner's share: £25,000
- High checkout: 170; Tytus Kanik; James Wade; Franz Rötzsch

Champion(s)
- Joe Cullen

The 2020 International Darts Open was the fourth and final PDC European Tour event on the 2020 PDC Pro Tour. The tournament took place at the SACHSENarena, Riesa, Germany from 23–25 October 2020. It featured a field of 48 players and £140,000 in prize money, with £25,000 going to the winner.

Gerwyn Price was the defending champion after defeating Rob Cross 8–6 in the final of the 2019 tournament. However, he was beaten 6–5 by Ross Smith in the second round.

Joe Cullen won his second European Tour title and fourth PDC title in all by defeating Michael van Gerwen 8–5 in the final, which also secured his place as the number 1 seed for the European Championship. It was the same scoreline against the same player as at his first ET title in Mannheim.

The tournament was postponed from its original date in early 2020 due to the COVID-19 pandemic in Germany.

== Prize money ==
This is how the prize money is divided, with the prize money being unchanged from the 2019 European Tour:

Stage (num. of players)		Prize money
Winner	(1)	£25,000
Runner-up	(1)	£10,000
Semi-finalists	(2)	£6,500
Quarter-finalists	(4)	£5,000
Third round losers	(8)	£3,000
Second round losers	(16)	£2,000*
First round losers	(16)	£1,000*
Total	£140,000	

- Seeded players who lose in the second round and Host Nation invitees who lose in the first round do not receive this prize money on any Orders of Merit.

== Qualification and format ==
The top 16 entrants from the PDC ProTour Order of Merit on 4 February automatically qualified for the event and were seeded in the second round.

The remaining 32 places went to players from four qualifying events and to two invitees – 23 from the Tour Card Holder Qualifier (held on 14 February), two from the Associate Member Qualifier (held on 15 October), three from the Host Nation Qualifier (held on 22 October), one from the Nordic & Baltic Associate Member Qualifier (held on 12 October 2019), and one from the East European Associate Member Qualifier (held on 8 February).

The two highest ranked German players on the ProTour Order of Merit as of the 14 February cut-off date also qualified.

Kyle Anderson, Peter Wright, Dirk van Duijvenbode and Ryan Murray withdrew, while Niels Zonneveld and Glen Durrant pulled out because of contracting COVID-19. All six players were replaced by Host Nation Qualifiers, while José de Sousa and Stephen Bunting were promoted to seeds.

The following players took part in the tournament:

Top 16

1. (Netherlands) Michael van Gerwen (runner-up)
2. (Wales) Gerwyn Price (second round)
3. (England) Ian White (second round)
4. (Poland) Krzysztof Ratajski (quarter-finals)
5. (Austria) Mensur Suljović (semi-finals)
6. (Northern Ireland) Daryl Gurney (second round)
7. (England) Dave Chisnall (third round)
8. (England) James Wade (quarter-finals)
9. (England) Nathan Aspinall (third round)
10. (England) Joe Cullen (champion)
11. (England) Adrian Lewis (second round)
12. (England) Jamie Hughes (third round)
13. (England) Rob Cross (second round)
14. (England) Michael Smith (semi-finals)
15. (Portugal) José de Sousa (second round)
16. (England) Stephen Bunting (second round)

Tour Card Qualifier
- (Hong Kong) Kai Fan Leung (first round)
- (Wales) Jamie Lewis (first round)
- (England) Andy Hamilton (third round)
- (England) Jason Lowe (second round)
- (Spain) Jesús Noguera (third round)
- (Latvia) Madars Razma (second round)
- (Netherlands) Jelle Klaasen (first round)
- (Germany) Martin Schindler (second round)
- (Netherlands) Maik Kuivenhoven (first round)
- (Netherlands) Ron Meulenkamp (second round)
- (Netherlands) Danny Noppert (quarter-finals)
- (England) Ross Smith (quarter-finals)
- (Northern Ireland) Brendan Dolan (first round)
- (Netherlands) Benito van de Pas (first round)
- (Netherlands) Martijn Kleermaker (second round)
- (England) Steve West (second round)
- (Spain) Toni Alcinas (first round)
- (England) Scott Baker (third round)

Associate Member Qualifier
- (England) Scott Marsh (first round)
- (Belgium) Mario Vandenbogaerde (first round)

Highest Ranked Germans
- (Germany) Gabriel Clemens (second round)
- (Germany) Max Hopp (third round)

Host Nation Qualifier
- (Germany) Robert Marijanović (second round)
- (Germany) Simeon Heinz (first round)
- (Germany) Michael Unterbuchner (first round)
- (Germany) Philipp Hagemann (first round)
- (Germany) Franz Rötzsch (third round)
- (Germany) Sebastian Pohl (first round)
- (Germany) Michael Rosenauer (first round)
- (Germany) Arsen Ballaj (first round)

Nordic & Baltic Qualifier
- (Sweden) Andreas Harrysson (second round)

East European Qualifier
- (Poland) Tytus Kanik (first round)

== Draw ==
First round (best of 11 legs); 23 October
(Latvia) Madars Razma 84.26	6
(Hong Kong) Kai Fan Leung 83.91	4
(Germany) Simeon Heinz 79.83	2
(England) Andy Hamilton 83.82	6
(Netherlands) Benito van de Pas 80.33	3
(Sweden) Andreas Harrysson 79.65	6
(England) Scott Marsh 94.22	5
(England) Jason Lowe 97.70	6
(Netherlands) Martijn Kleermaker 85.34	6
(Germany) Arsen Ballaj 83.35	5
(Germany) Franz Rötzsch 93.40	6
(Northern Ireland) Brendan Dolan 89.40	4
(Germany) Gabriel Clemens 99.58	6
(Germany) Philipp Hagemann 83.20	1
(England) Steve West 94.53	6
(Spain) Toni Alcinas 93.78	3
(Belgium) Mario Vandenbogaerde 92.48	1
(England) Ross Smith 112.86	6
(Germany) Max Hopp 93.92	6
(Netherlands) Jelle Klaasen 87.50	1
(Germany) Michael Rosenauer 78.88	2
(Netherlands) Ron Meulenkamp 82.98	6
(Wales) Jamie Lewis 57.72	0
(Germany) Robert Marijanović 99.10	6
(Netherlands) Maik Kuivenhoven 82.30	0
(Spain) Jesús Noguera 90.18	6
(Poland) Tytus Kanik 86.05	1
(Germany) Martin Schindler 90.78	6
(England) Scott Baker 94.38	6
(Germany) Michael Unterbuchner 83.06	4
(Netherlands) Danny Noppert 89.20	6
(Germany) Sebastian Pohl 77.16	1

Second round (best of 11 legs); 24 October
1	(Netherlands) Michael van Gerwen 89.98	6
(Latvia) Madars Razma 86.40	4
16	(England) Stephen Bunting 87.79	5
(England) Andy Hamilton 88.34	6
8	(England) James Wade 90.22	6
(Sweden) Andreas Harrysson 77.52	3
9	(England) Nathan Aspinall 92.34	6
(England) Jason Lowe 95.47	5
4	(Poland) Krzysztof Ratajski 99.16	6
(Netherlands) Martijn Kleermaker 93.39	4
13	(England) Rob Cross 94.54	3
(Germany) Franz Rötzsch 103.02	6
5	(Austria) Mensur Suljović 103.80	6
(Germany) Gabriel Clemens 94.86	5
12	(England) Jamie Hughes 84.51	6
(England) Steve West 87.57	4
2	(Wales) Gerwyn Price 92.96	5
(England) Ross Smith 96.75	6
15	(Portugal) José de Sousa 94.84	3
(Germany) Max Hopp 98.75	6
7	(England) Dave Chisnall 104.43	6
(Netherlands) Ron Meulenkamp 93.73	3
10	(England) Joe Cullen 101.27	6
(Germany) Robert Marijanović 87.15	1
3	(England) Ian White 92.76	3
(Spain) Jesús Noguera 93.00	6
14	(England) Michael Smith 96.20	6
(Germany) Martin Schindler 90.13	2
6	(Northern Ireland) Daryl Gurney 91.75	3
(England) Scott Baker 89.98	6
11	(England) Adrian Lewis 93.10	3
(Netherlands) Danny Noppert 103.39	6

Third round (best of 11 legs); 25 October
1	(Netherlands) van Gerwen 88.23	6
(England) Hamilton 81.00	5
8	(England) Wade 97.02	6
9	(England) Aspinall 91.14	2
4	(Poland) Ratajski 102.45	6
(Germany) Rötzsch 96.80	5
5	(Austria) Suljović 97.57	6
12	(England) Hughes 90.57	2
(England) R. Smith 94.18	6
(Germany) Hopp 95.79	4
7	(England) Chisnall 82.42	1
10	(England) Cullen 89.24	6
(Spain) Noguera 93.50	1
14	(England) M. Smith 94.45	6
(England) Baker 78.27	2
(Netherlands) Noppert 92.60	6

Quarter-finals (best of 11 legs); 25 October
1	(Netherlands) van Gerwen 102.18	6
8	(England) Wade 99.79	3
4	(Poland) Ratajski 102.29	5
5	(Austria) Suljović 99.63	6
(England) R. Smith 100.00	4
10	(England) Cullen 99.02	6
14	(England) M. Smith 98.55	6
(Netherlands) Noppert 93.12	1

Semi-finals (best of 13 legs); 25 October
1	(Netherlands) van Gerwen 88.91	7
5	(Austria) Suljović 92.01	6
10	(England) Cullen 96.14	7
14	(England) M. Smith 89.96	3

Final (best of 15 legs); 25 October
1	(Netherlands) van Gerwen 91.37	5
10	(England) Cullen 97.19	8
