= Jesús Noguera =

Spanish darts player

Personal information
- Full name: Jesús Noguera Perea
- Nickname: "Yuso"
- Born: 3 May 1990 (age 36) Orihuela, Spain
- Home town: Orihuela, Spain

Sport
- Sport: Darts
- Playing since: 2012
- Darts: Dynasty 21g
- Laterality: Right-handed
- Walk-on music: "Look at Me Now" by Jessy

Organisation (see split in darts)
- BDO: 2019
- PDC: 2012– (Tour Card: 2020–2021)

WDF major events – best performances
- World Masters: Last 128: 2019

PDC premier events – best performances
- UK Open: Last 128: 2021

Other tournament wins
- Years
PDC Challenge Tour	2019 (x2)

Jesús Noguera Perea (born 3 May 1990) is a Spanish professional darts player who competes in Professional Darts Corporation (PDC) events. He has won two PDC Challenge Tour titles, both in 2019. He has also represented Spain at the PDC World Cup of Darts on three occasions.

== Career ==
Noguera reached the final of the Southern Europe Qualifier for the 2018 PDC World Darts Championship, but lost 6–5 to compatriot Toni Alcinas. He missed out on World Championship qualification again the next year, losing to José de Sousa in the final of the South & West Europe Qualifier for the 2019 edition.

In 2019, Noguera saw success on the PDC Challenge Tour. He won his first title in the seventh event, defeating Mark Walsh 5–1 in the final with a three-dart average of over 100. He won a second title at event 15, once again averaging over 100 in a 5–2 win over Kyle McKinstry. At the end of the year, Noguera finished second on the Challenge Tour Order of Merit behind Callan Rydz, earning a PDC Tour Card for the next two years.

In 2020, Noguera took part in the PDC Home Tour from his friend's house in Orihuela. On 8 May, he played in a group featuring Danny Noppert, Jamie Hughes and world number 10 Ian White. Noguera – ranked 127 in the world at the time – achieved wins over White and Wilson to surprisingly top the group. This qualified him for the Home Tour Play-Offs, where he finished bottom of group seven.

Noguera also made his debut on the PDC European Tour in 2020, reaching the last 16 of the 2020 International Darts Open. He whitewashed Maik Kuivenhoven 6–0 in the first round before a 6–3 win over Ian White. He was eliminated by Michael Smith who beat him 6–1.

Noguera represented Spain for the first time at the 2020 World Cup of Darts after stepping in as a replacement for Cristo Reyes. He partnered Toni Alcinas and the pair won their opening match against Italy. They lost 2–0 to the Netherlands in the second round. He represented Spain again the next year, now partnering José Justicia, but the duo lost in a deciding leg to South Africa in the first round.

Noguera lost his Tour Card at the end of 2021 and failed to regain it at 2022 Q-School. He returned to the World Cup of Darts at the 2024 event, partnering José Justicia for a second time. The pair finished bottom of their group after a 4–0 loss to Sweden and a surprise defeat against Gibraltar.

== Performance timeline ==
Tournament	2019	2020	2021	2022	2023	2024	2025
PDC Ranked televised events
UK Open	DNP	1R	2R	DNP			
PDC Non-ranked televised events
World Cup of Darts	DNP	2R	1R	DNP		RR	
WDF Ranked televised events
World Masters	2R	DNP					
Career statistics
Year-end ranking (PDC)	199	122	105	-	-	-	

PDC European Tour

Season	1	2	3	4
2020	BDC; DNQ	GDC; DNQ	EDG; DNQ	IDO; 3R
2021	HDT; DNQ	GDT; DNQ		

Performance Table Legend
W	Won the tournament	F	Finalist	SF	Semifinalist	QF	Quarterfinalist	#R; RR; L#	Lost in # round Round-robin; Last # stage	DQ	Disqualified
DNQ	Did not qualify	DNP	Did not participate	WD	Withdrew	NH	Tournament not held	#R; RR; L#	Lost in # round Round-robin; Last # stage	NYF	Not yet founded
