= Mike van Duivenbode =

Dutch darts player

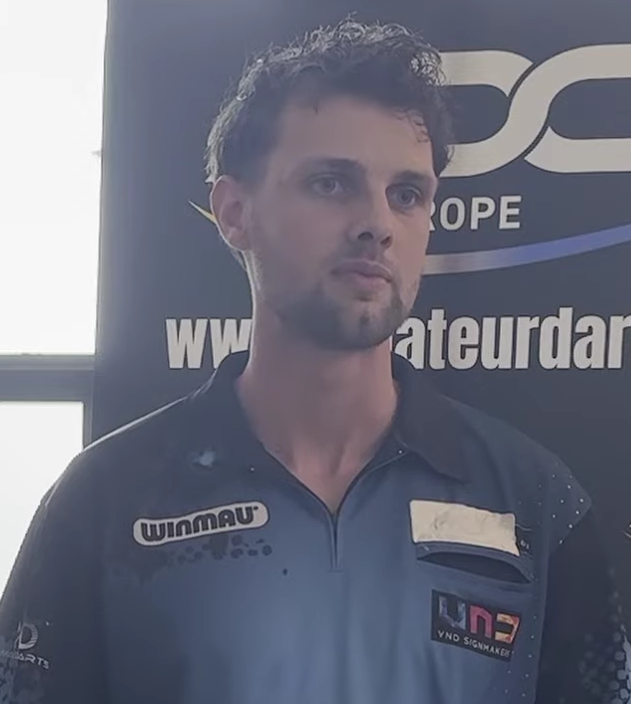
- van Duivenbode in 2024

Personal information
- Nickname: "The Pigeon"
- Born: 4 January 1999 (age 27) Dordrecht, Netherlands

Sport
- Sport: Darts
- Playing since: 2012
- Darts: 24g Winmau Stratos
- Laterality: Right-handed
- Walk-on music: "Narcotic" by Liquido

Organisation (see split in darts)
- BDO: 2014-2016
- PDC: 2016–

WDF major events – best performances
- Dutch Open: Last 16: 2024, 2026

PDC premier events – best performances
- UK Open: Last 128: 2020

Other tournament wins
- Years
2017 (x2)

Mike van Duivenbode (born 4 January 1999) is a Dutch professional darts player who competes in Professional Darts Corporation (PDC) and World Darts Federation (WDF) events.

== Career ==
In 2017 he won two Development Tour events, in which he beat Dimitri Van den Bergh 5–3 and Adam Hunt 5–0 in the respective finals.

He won a PDC Tour Card at the second day of the 2019 European Q-School by beating Madars Razma 5–4 in the final, which coincidentally came on his 20th birthday.
