= Scott Baker (darts player) =

English darts player (born 1986)

Personal information
- Nickname: The Mod
- Born: 31 March 1986 (age 40) West Bromwich, West Midlands, England
- Home town: Tipton, West Midlands, England

Sport
- Sport: Darts
- Playing since: 2011
- Darts: 15g
- Laterality: Right-handed
- Walk-on music: "My Generation" by The Who

Organisation (see split in darts)
- BDO: 2016–2019
- PDC: 2019–present (Tour Card 2019–2020)

WDF major events – best performances
- World Championship: Last 16: 2019
- World Masters: Last 32: 2018
- World Trophy: Quarter-final: 2018

PDC premier events – best performances
- UK Open: Last 96: 2019
- PC Finals: Last 64: 2019

Other tournament wins
- Tournament: Years
- German Masters Lincolnshire Open Welsh Masters Wolverhampton Classic: 2018; 2017; 2017; 2018

Scott Baker (born 31 March 1986) is an English darts player who competes in Professional Darts Corporation (PDC) events.

== Career ==
In 2017, Baker won the Lincolnshire Open and Welsh Masters. He qualified for the 2018 BDO World Darts Championship as the 23rd ranked player in the BDO, but he lost 3–2 to Andy Baetens in the first round. The following year, he also qualified for the tournament and won his first game 3–0 against Ross Montgomery, before a stunning comeback against reigning champion Glen Durrant fell just short in the second round.

Baker opted to enter PDC UK Q-School in January 2019 with the BDO restrictions having been lifted. Following a run to the last 16 on the first day, Baker beat Danny Lauby Jr. 5–1 in the final on day two to seal a two-year PDC Tour Card.

== World Championship results ==
=== BDO World Championship ===
- 2018: 1st Round (lost to Andy Baetens 2–3)
- 2019: 2nd Round (lost to Glen Durrant 3–4)

== Performance timeline ==
=== BDO ===
Tournament	2016	2017	2018	2019
BDO Ranked televised events
World Championship	Did not qualify		1R	2R
World Trophy	Did not qualify		QF	PDC
World Masters	L144	L80	L32	PDC

=== PDC ===
Tournament	2019	2020	2025
PDC Ranked televised events
UK Open	3R	2R	1R
Players Championship Finals	1R	DNQ	

==== Players Championships ====
Season	1	2	3	4	5	6	7	8	9	10	11	12	13	14	15	16	17	18	19	20	21	22	23	24	25	26	27	28	29	30
2019	WIG; SF	WIG; 1R	WIG; 1R	WIG; 3R	BAR; 3R	BAR; 2R	WIG; 3R	WIG; 1R	BAR; SF	BAR; 1R	BAR; 1R	BAR; 1R	BAR; 1R	BAR; 3R	BAR; 1R	BAR; 1R	WIG; 1R	WIG; 2R	BAR; 1R	BAR; 1R	HIL; 1R	HIL; 1R	BAR; 2R	BAR; 1R	BAR; 1R	BAR; 2R	DUB; 2R	DUB; 1R	BAR; 1R	BAR; 1R
2020	BAR; 1R	BAR; 1R	WIG; 3R	WIG; 1R	WIG; 2R	WIG; 1R	BAR; 1R	BAR; 2R	MIL; 1R	MIL; 1R	MIL; 2R	MIL; 2R	MIL; QF	NIE; 1R	NIE; 2R	NIE; 1R	NIE; 1R	NIE; 4R	COV; 1R	COV; 1R	COV; 1R	COV; 1R	COV; 1R							

Performance Table Legend
W	Won the tournament	F	Finalist	SF	Semifinalist	QF	Quarterfinalist	#R; RR; L#	Lost in # round Round-robin; Last # stage	DQ	Disqualified
DNQ	Did not qualify	DNP	Did not participate	WD	Withdrew	NH	Tournament not held	#R; RR; L#	Lost in # round Round-robin; Last # stage	NYF	Not yet founded
