= Carl Wilkinson (darts player) =

English darts player

Personal information
- Nickname: The Sword
- Born: 9 May 1984 (age 42) Bradford, England
- Home town: Barnsley, South Yorkshire, England

Sport
- Sport: Darts
- Playing since: 2004
- Darts: 23 Gram One80
- Laterality: Right-handed
- Walk-on music: "Boom, Boom, Boom, Boom!!" by Vengaboys

Organisation (see split in darts)
- PDC: 2017– (Tour Card 2019–2020)
- WDF: 2022–
- Current world ranking: (WDF) NR (17 August 2026)

WDF major events – best performances
- World Championship: Last 16: 2024
- World Masters: Last 64: 2024

PDC premier events – best performances
- UK Open: Last 96: 2018

Other tournament wins
- Years
Polish Open	2018
British Open	2024
Isle of Man Open	2024

Carl Wilkinson (born 9 May 1984) is an English professional darts player who plays in Professional Darts Corporation (PDC) and World Darts Federation (WDF) events.

He attended UK Q-School in 2019, where he won a two-year Tour Card after finishing 2nd on the Order of Merit rankings.

== Career ==
=== 2019 ===
Wilkinson made his PDC European Tour debut at the 2019 Gibraltar Darts Trophy. He defeated Home Nation Qualifier Justin Hewitt 6–3 before losing to 6th seed Daryl Gurney 6–4 in the second round.

=== 2020 ===
Wilkinson won Group 13 at the 2020 PDC Home Tour, with a 5–3 win over Matthew Edgar, a 5–1 win against Callan Rydz, and a 5–2 victory in his final group game against Steve Beaton.

=== 2023 ===
Wilkison was the runner-up at the 2023 British Classic. In the opening four rounds Wilkinson achieved 3 whitewash victories, with averages of 81.24 in victory against Tom Callaghan, 92.49 in defeating Andrew Brindon, 92.04 in a 4–1 win over Andrew Broll, and 87.13 in a 4–0 win against Dean Fitch before he defeated Jelle Klaasen 4–1 in the last 32, with Wilkinson averaging 91.44 to Klaasen’s 92.76. In the last 16 he defeated Thomas Gregory 4–2, Wilkinson then defeated Harry Lane 4–2, averaging 89.69, to reach the semi-finals. Wilkinson defeated Paul Mitchell 4–1 before being whitewashed by Luke Littler 5–0 in the final. Littler averaged 105.85 to Wilkinson’s 85.04.

=== 2024 ===
Wilkinson won the 2024 Isle of Man Open, defeating Deian Roberts 5–2 in the final.

Wilkinson also won the 2024 British Open. He defeated Karl Corcoran 4–2 in the last 32, then Lewis Pride 4–3, in a deciding leg, Andy Harland 4–1, and Henry Coates 4–2 to reach the final. In the final he won 5–2 against Jim McEwan, Wilkinson averaged 94.89.

He was the runner-up at the 2024 Welsh Classic, losing to Cliff Prior 5–2 in the final.

He reached the last 64 of the 2024 World Masters, winning all 4 of his games in Group AU, then defeating Tom Smith 5–2, before losing to Andreas Harrysson, who averaged 99.12, 5–4 in a deciding leg.

Wilkinson qualified for the 2024 WDF World Darts Championship at the Lakeside Country Club virtue of being ranked 17th on their World Championship rankings race. He was drawn to play Jacob Taylor in the first round, who he whitewashed 2–0 in sets. The vandalism of his Wikipedia article was mentioned in the commentary during the game, with the commentators attributing the edits to Scott Waites.
