= PDC Awards Dinner =

English awards ceremony for darts players

- Sponsored by: Professional Darts Corporation
- Venue: The Dorchester
- Country: England
- First award: January 9, 2007

Highlights
- Most awards: Michael van Gerwen (19)

The PDC Awards Dinner is an awards ceremony organised by the Professional Darts Corporation. It is held at the Dorchester Hotel in London. It has been held annually since 2007. Each January, the PDC has awarded players for outstanding performance in the previous season including player of the year awards, recognizing nine-dart finishes, and inducting members to the PDC Hall of Fame.

== Awards ==
=== Player of the Year ===
PDC Player of the Year is the most prestigious award presented at the annual Awards Dinner. Eight different players have received the award, with Phil Taylor and Michael van Gerwen both getting the honour a record six times.

Awards	Name	Years won
6	Phil Taylor	2006; 2008; 2009; 2010; 2011; 2012
6	Michael van Gerwen	2013; 2015 (Note: Gary Anderson and Michael van Gerwen were named joint player of the year for 2015.); 2016; 2017; 2018; 2019
2	Gary Anderson	2014; 2015
2	Luke Littler	2024; 2025
1	James Wade	2007
1	Gerwyn Price	2020
1	Peter Wright	2021
1	Michael Smith	2022
1	Luke Humphries	2023

=== Young Player of the Year ===
The PDC Winmau Young Player of the Year award is bestowed upon a young player who has shown success on the circuit that year. Although there is no strict age cutoff for the award, honorees have historically been 25 years of age or under.

Awards	Name	Years won
3	Luke Littler	2023; 2024; 2025
2	James Wade	2006; 2008
2	Michael van Gerwen	2011; 2012
2	Michael Smith	2013; 2015
1	Kirk Shepherd	2007
1	Adrian Lewis	2009
1	Arron Monk	2010
1	Keegan Brown	2014
1	Benito van de Pas	2016
1	Dimitri Van den Bergh	2017
1	Max Hopp	2018
1	Luke Humphries	2019
1	Callan Rydz	2020
1	Rusty-Jake Rodriguez	2021
1	Josh Rock	2022

=== PDPA Players' Player of the Year ===
The second most prestigious award of the Awards Dinner, the PDPA Players' Player of the Year is voted on by fellow PDPA members (PDC tour card holders) each year. Michael van Gerwen has won the award a record three times.

Awards	Name	Years won
3	Michael van Gerwen	2012; 2015; 2016
2	Phil Taylor	2008; 2009
2	Peter Wright	2013; 2019
2	Michael Smith	2018; 2022
1	Dennis Priestley	2006
1	James Wade	2007
1	Simon Whitlock	2010
1	Justin Pipe	2011
1	Gary Anderson	2014
1	Rob Cross	2017
1	Gerwyn Price	2020
1	Jonny Clayton	2021
1	Luke Humphries	2023
1	Luke Littler	2024
1	Gian van Veen	2025

=== Fans' Player of the Year ===
The PDC Village Hotels Fans' Player of the Year has been awarded each year of the Awards Dinner to the player receiving the most votes via online poll. Phil Taylor has won the award a record five times, with consecutive seasons 2007–2011.

Awards	Name	Years won
5	Phil Taylor	2007; 2008; 2009; 2010; 2011
3	Michael van Gerwen	2012; 2013; 2016
3	Gary Anderson	2014; 2015; 2018
2	Luke Littler	2024; 2025
1	Raymond van Barneveld	2006
1	Rob Cross	2017
1	Peter Wright	2019
1	Gerwyn Price	2020
1	Jonny Clayton	2021
1	Michael Smith	2022
1	Luke Humphries	2023

=== Best Newcomer ===
The PDC Vanquis Best Newcomer has been awarded in most editions of the Awards Dinner, with the award going to a player with an outstanding debut year in the PDC. It was not awarded in 2014 or 2017, where it was replaced by the Most Improved Player award.

Name	Year
Raymond van Barneveld	2006
Mervyn King	2007
Robert Thornton	2008
Simon Whitlock	2009
Mark Hylton	2010
Dave Chisnall	2011
Dean Winstanley	2012
Stephen Bunting	2014
Alan Norris	2015
Rob Cross	2017
Luke Humphries	2018
Glen Durrant	2019
Damon Heta	2020
Alan Soutar	2021
Josh Rock	2022
Gian van Veen	2023
Luke Littler	2024
Niko Springer	2025

=== Best ProTour Player ===
A variation of Best ProTour Player has been awarded to a player with outstanding performance on the PDC Pro Tour each year since the inception of the PDC Awards Dinner in 2007. The award was presented as "Best Floor Player" in 2007 and 2008, and has been awarded as "Pro Tour Player of the Year" or "Best Pro Tour Player" since 2009. Michael van Gerwen has been presented the award a record five times, coinciding with his winning of a record 91 Pro Tour titles.

Awards	Name	Years won
5	Michael van Gerwen	2013; 2015; 2016; 2018; 2019
3	Dave Chisnall	2012; 2023; 2024
3	Gerwyn Price	2020; 2021; 2025
2	Phil Taylor	2008; 2009
2	Gary Anderson	2011; 2014
1	Barrie Bates	2006
1	Raymond van Barneveld	2007
1	Simon Whitlock	2010
1	Peter Wright	2017
1	Luke Humphries	2022

=== Televised Performance of the Year ===
Televised Performance of the Year is awarded to a player who has won a televised match (or entire tournament in the 2016 case) that makes for a great performance. Only James Wade and Adrian Lewis have received the award twice. Notably, Michael van Gerwen has never won the award, but has been on the losing end of six different matches that did.

Year	Player (avg)	Score	Opponent (avg)	Tournament	Stage	Date	Ref.
2006	Roland Scholten (104.13)	11 – 3	Raymond van Barneveld (91.79)	Premier League	Semi-final	29 May 2006	
2007	Kevin McDine (105.79)	10 – 7	James Wade (102.55)	Grand Slam	Second round	21 November 2007	
2008	James Wade (102.73)	17 – 5	Wayne Mardle (88.92)	World Matchplay	Semi-final	25 July 2008	
2009	Mervyn King (89.86)	10 – 6	Phil Taylor (95.78)	Premier League	Semi-final	25 May 2009	
2010	Adrian Lewis (99.40)	7 – 5^{S}	Gary Anderson (99.41)	World Championship	Final	3 January 2011	
2011	Adrian Lewis (95.55)	6 – 5^{S}	James Wade (94.19)	World Championship	Semi-final	1 January 2012	
2012	Raymond van Barneveld (95.79)	16 – 14	Michael van Gerwen (98.55)	Grand Slam	Final	18 November 2012	
2013	Simon Whitlock (96.33)	10 – 9	Jamie Caven (95.31)	European Championship	Quarter-final	7 July 2013	
2014	James Wade (91.39)	11 – 10	Mervyn King (92.15)	Masters	Final	2 November 2014	
2015	Robert Thornton (90.79)	5 – 4^{S}	Michael van Gerwen (96.79)	World Grand Prix	Final	10 October 2015	
2016	Phil Taylor (103.16)^{T}	52 – 19^{T}	Various	Champions League	Tournament	24–25 September 2016	
2017	Rob Cross (100.97)	6 – 5^{S}	Michael van Gerwen (102.44)	World Championship	Semi-final	30 December 2017	
2018	Daryl Gurney (95.61)	11 – 9	Michael van Gerwen (100.20)	Players Championship Finals	Final	25 November 2018	
2019	Peter Wright (102.79)	7 – 3^{S}	Michael van Gerwen (102.88)	World Championship	Final	1 January 2020	
2020	Dave Chisnall (107.34)	5 – 0^{S}	Michael van Gerwen (98.29)	World Championship	Quarter-final	1 January 2021	
2021	Michael Smith (99.84)	4 – 3^{S}	Jonny Clayton (102.48)	World Championship	Fourth round	29 December 2021	
2022	Ross Smith (101.32)	11 – 8	Michael Smith (100.47)	European Championship	Final	30 October 2022	
2023	Luke Littler (106.05	6 – 2^{S}	Rob Cross (102.77)	World Championship	Semi-final	2 January 2024	
2024	Mike De Decker (92.06)	6 – 4^{S}	Luke Humphries (90.56)	World Grand Prix	Final	13 October 2024	

^{S}Scores for the World Championship and World Grand Prix are in sets (best of 5 legs), all other scores are straight legs.
^{T}Total tournament average and leg record is given for Phil Taylor's performance in the 2016 Champions League.

=== PDC Nine-Dart Club ===
The PDC awards gold pins to players that threw televised nine-darters over the year, and silver pins to those that threw non-televised nine-darters. There have been 343 total nine-darters thrown by 167 different players in PDC events. 53 of the PDC nine-darters were televised, with an additional 39 that have been thrown on streamed boards of the Pro Tour that are not included in the televised lists. Michael van Gerwen holds the record for PDC nine-darters, with 24 perfect games in PDC tournaments. A record 47 nine-darters were during the 2019 season, though only one of them was televised. James Wade has been on the receiving end of a record 11 nine-darters, notably including the first double-start perfect game by Brendan Dolan at the World Grand Prix, and two perfect games in one match by Phil Taylor in the 2010 Premier League.

=== Most Improved Player ===
The Most Improved Player is a defunct award that was only awarded at the 2014 and 2017 Awards Dinners, where it took the place of Best Newcomer. UK Open semi-finalist Peter Wright was named 2013 Most Improved Player, and European Championship runner up Mensur Suljović was named the 2016 Most Improved Player.

== PDC Hall of Fame ==
In 2005, the PDC introduced a Hall of Fame to recognise individuals with noteworthy contributions to darts. The first two inductees were Eric Bristow and John Lowe, great rivals throughout the eighties and early nineties – at least one of these two players managed to reach the World Championship Final each year for the first 14 incarnations of the World Professional Darts Championship, from 1978 to 1991, with three being played against each other. As of 2007, Hall of Fame inductees are now announced at the PDC Awards Dinner. The inductees comprise players, officials, administrators, commentators, and presenters that have contributed to the sport of darts and the success of the PDC.

Name	Year	Contribution to darts
Eric Bristow	2005	5 time World Darts Champion
John Lowe	2005	3 time World Darts Champion
Freddie Williams	2006	PDC referee
Phil Jones	2007	PDC Master of Ceremonies
John Raby	2007	Founder of JR Darts
Sid Waddell	2008	PDC and Sky Sports commentator
Dave Lanning	2008	PDC and Sky Sports commentator
Dennis Priestley	2009	Twice World Champion including inaugural WDC World Championship
Dick Allix	2010	Player Manager
Tommy Cox	2010	Player manager and PDC tournament director
Phil Taylor	2011	16 time World Champion
Bruce Spendley	2013	PDC referee
John Gwynne	2014	PDC and Sky Sports commentator
John Part	2017	3 time World Champion
Dave Clark	2018	PDC and Sky Sports presenter
Rod Harrington	2019	2 time World Matchplay Champion
Barry Hearn	2021	PDC Chairman
Russ Bray	2024	PDC Referee
George Noble	2025	PDC Referee
John McDonald	2025	Master of Ceromonies

== 2024 ==
The 2024 PDC Awards were announced on 31 January 2024 to commemorate PDC players for their performance in the 2023 season. No ceremony took place, with all the awards being announced on the PDC's social media channels.

PDC Player of the Year
Luke Humphries; Michael van Gerwen; Gerwyn Price; Nathan Aspinall
PDPA Players' Player of the Year	Village Fans' Player of the Year
Luke Humphries; Luke Littler (second); Michael van Gerwen (third)	Luke Humphries; Gerwyn Price (second); Nathan Aspinall (third)
PDC Moneybarn Best Newcomer	ProTour Player of the Year
Gian van Veen; Luke Littler; Richard Veenstra; Niels Zonneveld	Dave Chisnall; Luke Humphries; Gerwyn Price; Damon Heta
Toyo Tires Televised Performance of the Year	PDC Winmau Young Player of the Year
Luke Littler - 2024 PDC World Darts Championship semi-final v Rob Cross; Luke Humphries – 2024 PDC World Darts Championship final v Luke Littler; Michael van Gerwen – 2023 Premier League Darts final v Gerwyn Price; Nathan Aspinall – World Matchplay final v Jonny Clayton	Luke Littler; Josh Rock; Gian van Veen; Keane Barry

== 2023 ==
The 2023 PDC Awards were announced on 31 January 2023 to commemorate PDC players for their performance in the 2022 season. No ceremony took place, with all the awards being announced on the PDC's social media channels.

PDC Player of the Year
Michael Smith; Michael van Gerwen; Gerwyn Price; Joe Cullen
PDPA Players' Player of the Year	Selco Fans' Player of the Year
Michael Smith; Josh Rock (second); Michael van Gerwen (third)	Michael Smith; Michael van Gerwen (second); Gerwyn Price (third)
PDC Best Newcomer	ProTour Player of the Year
Josh Rock; Rowby-John Rodriguez; Scott Williams; Jim Williams	Luke Humphries; Michael van Gerwen; Damon Heta; Rob Cross
Toyo Tires Televised Performance of the Year	PDC Winmau Young Player of the Year
Ross Smith – European Championship final v Michael Smith; Gerwyn Price – Premier League Night 3 (Belfast) semi-final v Michael van Gerwen; Michael Smith – World Championship final v Michael van Gerwen; Michael van Gerwen – World Matchplay final v Gerwyn Price	Josh Rock; Nathan Rafferty; Keane Barry; Sebastian Białecki

== 2022 ==
The 2022 PDC Awards were announced on 27 January 2022 to commemorate PDC players for their performance in the 2021 season. No ceremony took place, with all the awards being announced on the PDC's social media channels.

PDC Player of the Year	PDC Unicorn Young Player of the Year
Peter Wright; Jonny Clayton; Gerwyn Price; James Wade	Rusty-Jake Rodriguez; Bradley Brooks; Ted Evetts; Keane Barry
PDPA Players' Player of the Year	Selco Fans' Player of the Year
Jonny Clayton; Peter Wright (second); Gerwyn Price & Callan Rydz (joint-third)	Jonny Clayton; Peter Wright (second); Dimitri Van den Bergh (third)
PDC Best Newcomer	ProTour Player of the Year
Alan Soutar; Florian Hempel; Keane Barry; Scott Mitchell	Gerwyn Price; José de Sousa; Michael Smith; Peter Wright
Toyo Tires Televised Performance of the Year	PDC Nine-Dart Club
Michael Smith – World Championship fourth round v Jonny Clayton; Jonny Clayton – Masters quarter-final v James Wade; Peter Wright – World Matchplay semi-final v Michael van Gerwen; Michael van Gerwen – European Championship quarter-final v Gerwyn Price	Gold Pins (televised): Jonny Clayton, José de Sousa, Sebastian Białecki, Jitse van der Wal, William Borland, Darius Labanauskas, Gerwyn Price Silver Pins (non-televised): José Marquês, Shane McGuirk, Martin Schindler, Michael Smith, Adrian Lewis, Mensur Suljović, Luke Woodhouse, Ritchie Edhouse, Wayne Jones, Mickey Mansell (x2), Nathan Aspinall (x2), Stephen Bunting, José de Sousa, Krzysztof Ratajski, Niels Zonneveld, Jim McEwan, Geert Nentjes, Ian White, Christian Kist, Danny Noppert, Martin Atkins, Dimitri Van den Bergh, Kim Huybrechts, Gabriel Clemens (x2), Ron Meulenkamp (x2), Ryan Harrington, Callan Rydz, Madars Razma (x2), Scott Waites, Steve West

== 2021 ==
The 2021 PDC Awards Ceremony was held on 25 January 2021 to commemorate PDC players for their performance in the 2020 season. The ceremony was notably held online due to the COVID-19 pandemic.

PDC Player of the Year	PDC Young Player of the Year
Gerwyn Price; Peter Wright; Michael van Gerwen; José de Sousa	Callan Rydz; Ryan Meikle; Bradley Brooks; Keane Barry
PDPA Players' Player of the Year	PDC Fans' Player of the Year
Gerwyn Price; José de Sousa (second); Dirk van Duijvenbode & Dimitri Van den Bergh (joint-third)	Gerwyn Price; Dirk van Duijvenbode (second); Dimitri Van den Bergh (third)
PDC Best Newcomer	ProTour Player of the Year
Damon Heta; Jason Lowe; Callan Rydz; Martijn Kleermaker	Gerwyn Price
Televised Performance of the Year	PDC Nine-Dart Club
Dave Chisnall – World Championship quarter-final v Michael van Gerwen; Peter Wright – Premier League (Exeter) v Nathan Aspinall; Michael van Gerwen – UK Open semi-final v Daryl Gurney; Simon Whitlock – World Grand Prix quarter-finals v Michael van Gerwen; José de Sousa – Grand Slam final v James Wade	Gold Pins (televised): Michael Smith, Jonny Clayton, Michael van Gerwen, Peter Wright, José de Sousa, James Wade Silver Pins (non-televised): Andy Jenkins, Mickey Mansell, Mike van Duivenbode, Keegan Brown, Scott Baker, Nathan Aspinall, Steve West, Mensur Suljović, Danny Noppert, Steve Lennon, Michael van Gerwen, Luke Woodhouse, Rob Cross, Darren Webster, Carl Wilkinson, James Wade, Devon Petersen, Moreno Blom, Robbie Ellis, Daniel Larsson, Andy Hamilton, Rowby-John Rodriguez, Nick Kenny
PDC Hall of Fame Inductee
Barry Hearn (PDC Chairman)

== 2020 ==
The 2020 PDC Awards Dinner was held on 30 January 2020 to commemorate PDC players for their performance in the 2019 season.

PDC Player of the Year	PDC Young Player of the Year
Michael van Gerwen; Peter Wright; Gerwyn Price; Rob Cross	Luke Humphries; Ted Evetts; Jeffrey de Zwaan; Max Hopp
PDPA Players' Player of the Year	PDC Fans' Player of the Year
Peter Wright; Gerwyn Price & Nathan Aspinall (joint runner-up)	Peter Wright; Gerwyn Price (runner-up)
PDC Best Newcomer	Best ProTour Player
Glen Durrant; Jamie Hughes; Darius Labanauskas; José de Sousa	Michael van Gerwen; Ian White; Gerwyn Price; Peter Wright
Televised Performance of the Year	PDC Nine-Dart Club
Peter Wright – World Championship final v Michael van Gerwen; Gerwyn Price – Grand Slam final v Peter Wright; Michael van Gerwen – World Grand Prix final v Dave Chisnall; Glen Durrant – World Matchplay last 16 v Michael van Gerwen	Gold Pins (televised): Michael van Gerwen Silver Pins (non-televised): Dave Chisnall (x3), Geert Nentjes (x3), Michael van Gerwen (x3), Gerwyn Price (x2), Ritchie Edhouse (x2), Ted Evetts (x2), Peter Jacques, Chris Dobey, Ricky Evans, Scott Baker, Danny Noppert, Brian Raman, James Wade, Mark McGeeney, Harry Ward, Callan Rydz, Steve Beaton, Geert De Vos, Michael Rasztovits, Robert Thornton, Madars Razma, Lourence Ilagan, Dimitri Van den Bergh, Andy Jenkins, Kyle Anderson, Boris Koltsov, Simon Preston, John Henderson, Matt Clark, José de Sousa, Jeffrey de Zwaan, Rob Cross, Ian White, Cody Harris, Mensur Suljović, James Beeton, Keane Barry

== 2019 ==
The 2019 PDC Awards Dinner was held on 21 January 2019 to commemorate PDC players for their performance in the 2018 season.

PDC Player of the Year	PDC Young Player of the Year
Michael van Gerwen; Gary Anderson; Michael Smith; James Wade	Max Hopp; Jeffrey de Zwaan; Luke Humphries; Dimitri Van den Bergh
PDPA Players' Player of the Year	PDC Fans' Player of the Year
Michael Smith; Michael van Gerwen (runner-up)	Gary Anderson; Michael van Gerwen (runner-up)
PDC Best Newcomer	Best ProTour Player
Luke Humphries; Gabriel Clemens; Ryan Joyce; Danny Noppert	Michael van Gerwen; Rob Cross; Ian White; Peter Wright
Televised Performance of the Year	PDC Nine-Dart Club
Daryl Gurney – Players Championship Finals final v Michael van Gerwen; Gary Anderson – World Matchplay quarter-final v Joe Cullen; Luke Humphries – World Championship fourth round v Rob Cross; Michael Smith – World Championship semi-final v Nathan Aspinall; Michael van Gerwen – Premier League final v Michael Smith	Gold Pins (televised): Gary Anderson, Dimitri Van den Bergh Silver Pins (non-televised): Robbie Green, Ian White, Michael van Gerwen (x3), Peter Jacques, John Goldie, Cameron Menzies, Jamie Lewis, Noel Malicdem, Steve Hine, Stephen Bunting, Nathan Aspinall, Dawson Murschell, Dennis Nilsson, Lee Turle, Simon Preston, Adrian Lewis, Vincent van der Voort, James Wade, Krzysztof Ratajski, Rowby-John Rodriguez, George Killington, Peter Hudson, Andrew Gilding, Jimmy Hendriks, Eddie Lovely
PDC Hall of Fame Inductee
Rod Harrington (PDC Director and two-time World Matchplay champion)

== 2018 ==
The 2018 PDC Awards Dinner was held on 22 January 2018 to commemorate PDC players for their performance in the 2017 season. Newly crowned World Champion Rob Cross received four awards to commemorate his outstanding debut season on the PDC tour, but was unable to edge out world number one Michael van Gerwen, who scooped seven premier titles over the season to win a third consecutive Player of the Year award.

PDC Player of the Year	PDC Young Player of the Year
Michael van Gerwen; Rob Cross; Daryl Gurney; Peter Wright	Dimitri Van den Bergh; Ted Evetts; Steve Lennon; Martin Schindler
PDPA Players' Player of the Year	PDC Fans' Player of the Year
Rob Cross	Rob Cross
PDC Best Newcomer	Best ProTour Player
Rob Cross; Luke Humphries; Steve Lennon; Richard North	Peter Wright; Rob Cross; Michael Smith; Michael van Gerwen
Televised Performance of the Year	PDC Nine-Dart Club
Rob Cross – World Championship semi-final v Michael van Gerwen; Phil Taylor – World Matchplay final v Peter Wright; Michael van Gerwen – World Championship second round v James Wilson; Peter Wright – Premier League (Exeter) v Adrian Lewis	Gold Pins (televised): Adrian Lewis, Kyle Anderson Silver Pins (non-televised): Robert Allenstein, Kyle Anderson, Steve Beaton, Dave Chisnall, Joe Cullen, Mike De Decker, Mark Dudbridge, Ted Evetts, Rob Hewson, Kim Huybrechts, Ronny Huybrechts, Christian Kist, Adrian Lewis, Jamie Lewis, Mickey Mansell, Ryan Meikle, Kenny Neyens, Mensur Suljovic, Michael van Gerwen, Darren Webster, Ricky Williams, Peter Wright
PDC Hall of Fame Inductee
Dave Clark (television presenter for Sky Sports)

== 2017 ==
The 2017 PDC Awards Dinner was held on 4 January 2017 to commemorate PDC players for their performance in the 2016 season. Michael van Gerwen reigned in four awards after capping off a 25 title season with his second World Championship victory.

PDC Player of the Year	PDC Young Player of the Year
Michael van Gerwen; Gary Anderson; Phil Taylor; Peter Wright	Benito van de Pas; Corey Cadby; Josh Payne; Chris Dobey
PDPA Players' Player of the Year	PDC Fans' Player of the Year
Michael van Gerwen	Michael van Gerwen
Most Improved Player	Best ProTour Player
Mensur Suljovic; Joe Cullen; James Wilson; Chris Dobey	Michael van Gerwen
Televised Performance of the Year	PDC Nine-Dart Club
Phil Taylor – Champions League of Darts; Michael van Gerwen – Premier League (Aberdeen) v Michael Smith; Peter Wright – Grand Slam of Darts quarter-finals v Phil Taylor; Michael van Gerwen – World Championship	Gold Pins (televised): Michael Van Gerwen, Adrian Lewis, Alan Norris Silver Pins (non-televised): Ross Smith, Jamie Caven, Mark Dudbridge, Richie Corner, Michael van Gerwen Stuart Kellett, Adrian Lewis, Alan Norris, Dave Chisnall, Devon Petersen, James Richardson, Jeffrey de Zwaan, Steve Brown, Daniel Cole, Rob Cross, Richard Baillie, Jeffrey de Graaf, Yordi Meeuwisse, Simon Whitlock
PDC Hall of Fame Inductee
John Part (three time World Champion, most successful North American darts player)

== 2016 ==
The 2016 PDC Awards Dinner was held on 21 January 2016 to commemorate PDC players for their performance in the 2015 season.

PDC Player of the Year	PDC Young Player of the Year
Michael van Gerwen & Gary Anderson; Phil Taylor; Adrian Lewis	Michael Smith; Benito van de Pas; Jamie Lewis; Max Hopp
PDPA Players' Player of the Year	PDC Fans' Player of the Year
Michael van Gerwen	Gary Anderson
PDC Best Newcomer	Best ProTour Player
Alan Norris; Dimitri Van den Bergh; Andy Boulton; Jeffrey de Zwaan	Michael van Gerwen
Televised Performance of the Year	PDC Nine-Dart Club
Robert Thornton – World Grand Prix final v Michael van Gerwen; James Wade – World Matchplay semi-final v Phil Taylor; Michael van Gerwen – European Championship final v Gary Anderson; Gary Anderson – World Championship semi-final v Jelle Klaasen	Gold Pins (televised): Phil Taylor, Dave Chisnall, Gary Anderson Silver Pins (non-televised): Alan Norris (x2), Dyson Parody, Andrew Gilding, Simon Whitlock, Ian White (x2), Kyle Anderson, Nathan Derry, Jeffrey de Zwaan, Cristo Reyes (x2), Darren Johnson, Benito van de Pas, Matt Dicken, Dirk van Duijvenbode, Devon Petersen, James Wade, Peter Wright, Max Hopp, Magnus Caris, Simon Preston, Kim Huybrechts, Jamie Lewis, Michael van Gerwen, Phil Taylor

== 2015 ==
The 2015 PDC Awards Dinner was held on 22 January 2015 to commemorate PDC players for their performance in the 2014 season. Newly crowned World Champion Gary Anderson became just the second player (after Phil Taylor) to sweep the four senior categories PDC, PDPA, Fans’, and Pro Tour Players of the year. James Wade secured the Televised Performance of the Year with his stunning comeback from 9–2 down to win the Masters final 11–10 over Mervyn King.

PDC Player of the Year	PDC Young Player of the Year
Gary Anderson; Phil Taylor; Michael van Gerwen; James Wade	Keegan Brown; Michael Smith; Benito van de Pas; Rowby-John Rodriguez
PDPA Players' Player of the Year	PDC Fans' Player of the Year
Gary Anderson	Gary Anderson
PDC Best Newcomer	ProTour Player of the Year
Stephen Bunting; Benito van de Pas; Christian Kist; Kyle Anderson	Gary Anderson
Televised Performance of the Year	PDC Nine-Dart Club
James Wade – Masters final v Mervyn King; Michael van Gerwen – European Championship semi-final v Raymond van Barneveld; Phil Taylor – World Matchplay semi-final v Gary Anderson; Kim Huybrechts – Grand Slam quarter-final v Michael van Gerwen	Gold Pins (televised): Phil Taylor, James Wade, Robert Thornton, Michael van Gerwen, Kim Huybrechts, Adrian Lewis Silver Pins (non-televised): Terry Jenkins, Dave Ladley, Dave Chisnall, David Pallett, Phil Taylor (x2), Adrian Lewis, Michael van Gerwen, Johnny Haines, Matt Dicken, Darryl Fitton, Gary Stone

== 2014 ==
The 2014 PDC Awards Dinner was held on 20 January 2014 to commemorate PDC players for their performance in the 2013 season.

PDC Player of the Year	PDC Young Player of the Year
Michael van Gerwen; Phil Taylor; Adrian Lewis; Dave Chisnall	Michael Smith; Jamie Lewis; Ross Smith; Arron Monk
PDPA Players' Player of the Year	PDC Fans' Player of the Year
Peter Wright	Michael van Gerwen
Most Improved Player	ProTour Player of the Year
Peter Wright; Ronny Huybrechts; Jamie Lewis; Ricky Evans	Michael van Gerwen
Televised Performance of the Year	PDC Nine-Dart Club
Simon Whitlock – European Championship quarter-final v Jamie Caven; Phil Taylor – World Matchplay final v Adrian Lewis; Phil Taylor & Adrian Lewis – Grand Slam semi-final; James Wade – World Championship second round v Andy Smith	Gold Pins (televised): Wes Newton, Phil Taylor, Mervyn King, Michael van Gerwen, Kim Huybrechts, Terry Jenkins, Kyle Anderson Silver Pins (non-televised): Charl Pietersen, Andy Parsons, Kevin McDine, Robert Thornton, Kevin Thomas, Gary Anderson, Andy Hamilton, Kurt Parry, Michael Smith, Prakash Jiwa, Adam Hunt, Joey Palfreyman, Steve Brown, Ross Smith, Gaz Cousins, Wes Newton, Jamie Robinson
PDC Hall of Fame Inductee
John Gwynne (Sky Sports commentator and darts journalist)

== 2013 ==
The 2013 PDC Awards Dinner was held on 2 January 2013 to commemorate PDC players for their performance in the 2012 season.

PDC Player of the Year	PDC Young Player of the Year	PDPA Players' Player of the Year
Phil Taylor	Michael van Gerwen	Michael van Gerwen
PDC Fans' Player of the Year	Best Newcomer	ProTour Player of the Year
Michael van Gerwen	Dean Winstanley	Dave Chisnall
Televised Performance of the Year
Raymond van Barneveld – Grand Slam of Darts final v Michael van Gerwen
PDC Nine-Dart Club
Gold Pins (televised): Phil Taylor, Simon Whitlock, Gary Anderson, Michael van Gerwen, Wes Newton, Dean Winstanley Silver Pins (non-televised): Ian White, Michael van Gerwen, Steve Farmer, Richie Burnett, Raymond van Barneveld, Simon Whitlock, Michael Smith, Kim Huybrechts, Colin Lloyd, Mark Webster, Wes Newton, Connie Finnan
PDC Hall of Fame Inductee
Bruce Spendley (PDC referee)

== 2012 ==
The 2012 PDC Awards Dinner was held on 3 January 2012 to commemorate PDC players for their performance in the 2011 season. For the fourth year running, Phil Taylor picked up the titles of Player of the Year, and Fans' Player of the year, having won five majors during 2011. Justin Pipe was named PDPA Players' Player of the Year, and Gary Anderson picked up the and Pro Tour Player of the Year title, having each won three and seven Pro Tour titles respectively. Adrian Lewis' five straight set comeback from 5–1 down to overcome James Wade in the World Championship semi-final earned the reigning world champion his second consecutive Televised Performance of the Year title. The 2012 Awards Dinner would also mark the first in a long line of awards for Michael van Gerwen, who this year picked up the Young Player of the Year award.

PDC Player of the Year	PDC Young Player of the Year	PDPA Players' Player of the Year
Phil Taylor	Michael van Gerwen	Justin Pipe
PDC Fans' Player of the Year	Best Newcomer	ProTour Player of the Year
Phil Taylor	Dave Chisnall	Gary Anderson
Televised Performance of the Year
Adrian Lewis – World Championship semi-final v James Wade
PDC Nine-Dart Club
Gold Pins (televised): John Part, Adrian Lewis, Brendan Dolan, Simon Whitlock, Phil Taylor Silver Pins (non-televised): Dave Chisnall, John Henderson, Michael Smith, Wayne Atwood, Dennis Priestley, Simon Whitlock, Justin Pipe, Phil Taylor, Raymond van Barneveld, Wes Newton, Mark Webster

== 2011 ==
The 2011 PDC Awards Dinner was held on 4 January 2011 to commemorate PDC players for their performance in the 2010 season.

PDC Player of the Year	PDC Young Player of the Year	PDPA Players' Player of the Year
Phil Taylor	Arron Monk	Simon Whitlock
PDC Fans' Player of the Year	Best Newcomer	ProTour Player of the Year
Phil Taylor	Mark Hylton	Simon Whitlock
Televised Performance of the Year
Adrian Lewis – World Championship final v Gary Anderson
PDC Nine-Dart Club
Gold Pins (televised): Raymond van Barneveld (x2), Phil Taylor (x2), Mervyn King, Adrian Lewis Silver Pins (non-televised): Matt Clark, Andy Hamilton (x2), Co Stompé, Simon Whitlock, Colin Lloyd, Jamie Caven, Mark Dudbridge
PDC Hall of Fame Inductee
Phil Taylor (16 times World Champion)

== 2010 ==
The 2010 PDC Awards Dinner was held on 5 January 2010 to commemorate PDC players for their performance in the 2009 season. For the second consecutive year, Phil Taylor picked up four senior awards after he won seven major titles, 12 Pro Tour events, and capped his season with his 15th World Championship title.

PDC Player of the Year	PDC Young Player of the Year	PDPA Players' Player of the Year
Phil Taylor	Adrian Lewis	Phil Taylor
PDC Fans' Player of the Year	Best Newcomer	Best ProTour Player
Phil Taylor	Simon Whitlock	Phil Taylor
Televised Performance of the Year
Mervyn King – Premier League semi-final v Phil Taylor
PDC Nine-Dart Club
Gold Pins (televised): Phil Taylor, Jelle Klaasen, Mervyn King, Raymond van Barneveld Silver Pins (non-televised): Mark Walsh, Mervyn King, Raymond van Barneveld, Vincent van der Voort, Gary Anderson, Colin Monk, Andy Smith, Larry Butler, Wes Newton, Adrian Lewis
PDC Hall of Fame Inductees
Dick Allix & Tommy Cox

== 2009 ==
The 2009 PDC Awards Dinner was held on 7 January 2009 to commemorate PDC players for their performance in the 2008 season.

PDC Player of the Year	PDC Young Player of the Year	PDPA Players' Player of the Year
Phil Taylor	James Wade	Phil Taylor
PDC Fans' Player of the Year	Best Newcomer	Best ProTour Player
Phil Taylor	Robert Thornton	Phil Taylor
Televised Performance of the Year
James Wade – World Matchplay semi-final v Wayne Mardle
PDC Nine-Dart Club
Gold Pins (televised): Phil Taylor, Adrian Lewis, James Wade, Raymond van Barneveld Silver Pins (non-televised): Colin Lloyd, Phil Taylor, Dave Askew, Colin Osborne, Ronnie Baxter, John MaGowan, Jelle Klaasen
PDC Hall of Fame Inductees
Dennis Priestley (first WDC World Champion)

== 2008 ==
The second annual PDC Awards Dinner was held on 9 January 2008 to commemorate PDC players for their performance in the 2007 season. James Wade picked up the top two awards after following his victories in the World Matchplay and World Grand Prix. The dinner was present to drama with the PDC receiving complaints about the conduct of Jason Clark, who was being inducted into the PDC Nine-Dart Club after hitting a nine-dart finish at the 2007 German Darts Championship. The darts regulation authority was asked to investigate, and Clark received a suspension followed by a one year ban and £500 fine.

PDC Player of the Year	PDC Young Player of the Year
James Wade; Raymond van Barneveld; Phil Taylor; John Part	Kirk Shepherd; Kevin McDine; Adrian Gray; Adrian Lewis
PDPA Players' Player of the Year	PDC Fans' Player of the Year
James Wade	Phil Taylor
PDC Best Newcomer	Best Floor Player
Mervyn King; Vincent van der Voort; Tony Eccles; Michael van Gerwen	Raymond van Barneveld; James Wade; Phil Taylor; Wayne Mardle
Televised Performance of the Year	PDC Nine-Dart Club
Kevin McDine – Grand Slam of darts second round v James Wade; James Wade – World Matchplay semi-final v Adrian Lewis; Wayne Mardle – World Championship quarter-final v Phil Taylor; Phil Taylor – Premier League v Raymond van Barneveld	Televised: Phil Taylor Non-televised: Gary Barnett, Jason Clark, Raymond van Barneveld
PDC Hall of Fame Inductees
Sid Waddell & Dave Lanning

== 2007 ==
The inaugural PDC Awards Dinner was held on 9 January 2007 to commemorate PDC players for their performance in the 2006 season. The top two awards went to Phil Taylor and Dennis Priestley, who shared twelve PDC World Titles between the pair, and had met in five world finals. Taylor edged out recently crowned world champion and 2006 UK Open winner Raymond van Barneveld with victories in five televised tournaments and a slew of high averages. Van Barneveld did come out with more hardware however, picking up the Fan's Player of the Year and Best Newcomer awards in addition to a gold pin for a televised nine-darter in the Premier League.

PDC Player of the Year	PDC Young Player of the Year
Phil Taylor; Raymond van Barneveld; Dennis Priestley; Terry Jenkins	James Wade; Adrian Lewis; Rico Vonck; Erwin Extercatte
PDPA Players' Player of the Year	PDC Fans' Player of the Year
Dennis Priestley	Raymond van Barneveld
PDC Best Newcomer	Best Floor Player
Raymond van Barneveld; John Kuczynski; Alan Tabern; Colin Osborne	Barrie Bates; Dennis Priestley; Mick McGowan; Colin Lloyd
Televised Performance of the Year	PDC Nine-Dart Club
Roland Scholten – Premier League semi-final v Raymond van Barneveld; Raymond van Barneveld – World Championship second round v Colin Lloyd; Adrian Lewis – World Series of Darts semi-final v Dennis Priestley; James Wade – World Matchplay semi-final v Roland Scholten	Gold Pins (televised): Phil Taylor, Raymond van Barneveld Silver Pins (non-televised): James Wade, Colin Osborne, Alan Tabern, Colin Lloyd, Roland Scholten, Yves Cottenge, Chris Mason, Wayne Mardle, Lionel Sams, Alan Warriner-Little, Paul Williams, Steve Beaton, Shayne Burgess, Graeme Stoddart, Ronnie Baxter
PDC Hall of Fame Inductees
Phil Jones & John Raby
