= 2021 PDC Calendar =

List of darts tournaments

This is a list of the 2021 Professional Darts Corporation calendar of events with player progression documented from the quarterfinals stage where applicable.

The list includes European tour events, Players Championships events, World Series of Darts events and PDC majors. It includes some regional tours, such as the ones in North American, Asian and Oceanic regions, but does not include World Darts Federation (WDF) events.

== January ==
Date	Tournament	Champions	Runners-up	Semi-finalists	Quarter-finalists
29–31 January	2021 Masters (England) Milton Keynes	(Wales) Jonny Clayton	(England) Mervyn King	(Wales) Gerwyn Price (Scotland) Peter Wright	(England) Adrian Lewis (England) Nathan Aspinall (England) Dave Chisnall (England) James Wade

== February ==
Date	Tournament	Champions	Runners-up	Semi-finalists	Quarter-finalists
8–17 February	2021 European Q-School (Germany) Niedernhausen	Does not apply.			
8–17 February	2021 UK Q-School (England) Milton Keynes	Does not apply.			
25 February	2021 PDC Players Championship 1 (England) Bolton	(England) Joe Cullen	(Wales) Jonny Clayton	(England) Nathan Aspinall (Wales) Jonathan Worsley	(England) Rob Cross (Germany) Gabriel Clemens (England) James Wade (England) Michael Smith
26 February	2021 PDC Players Championship 2 (England) Bolton	(England) Callan Rydz	(Wales) Jonny Clayton	(England) Nathan Aspinall (Netherlands) Vincent van der Voort	(Greece) John Michael (England) Ian White (England) Steve Beaton (Austria) Mensur Suljović
27 February	2021 EADC Tour 1 (Russia) Moscow	(Russia) Dmitriy Gorbunov	(Russia) Evgeniy Izotov	(Russia) Timofey Samoshkin (Russia) Vitaly Khokhryakov	(Russia) Dmitry Zhavoronkov (Russia) Maxim Aldoshin (Russia) Vadim Burykim (Russia) Evgeniy Demidenko
27 February	2021 EADC Tour 2 (Russia) Moscow	(Russia) Dmitriy Gorbunov	(Russia) Evgeniy Izotov	(Russia) Vitaly Khokhryakov (Russia) Maxim Aldoshin	(Russia) Anton Kolesov (Russia) Timofey Samoshkin (Russia) Pavel Shvetsov (Russia) Roman Obukhov
27 February	2021 PDC Players Championship 3 (England) Bolton	(Netherlands) Raymond van Barneveld	(England) Joe Cullen	(Netherlands) Danny Noppert (England) Ian White	(Poland) Krzysztof Ratajski (Wales) Jonny Clayton (Scotland) Alan Soutar (England) Glen Durrant
28 February	2021 EADC Tour 3 (Russia) Moscow	(Russia) Aleksei Kadochnikov	(Russia) Roman Obukhov	(Russia) Maxim Aldoshin (Russia) Vitaly Khokhryakov	(Russia) Anton Kolesov (Russia) Evgeniy Izotov (Russia) Dmitriy Gorbunov (Russia) Timofey Samoshkin
28 February	2021 PDC Players Championship 4 (England) Bolton	(Wales) Jonny Clayton	(Australia) Damon Heta	(Germany) Gabriel Clemens (Netherlands) Michael van Gerwen	(Northern Ireland) Daryl Gurney (England) Michael Smith (Latvia) Madars Razma (Netherlands) Dirk van Duijvenbode

== March ==
Date	Tournament	Champions	Runners-up	Semi-finalists	Quarter-finalists
5–7 March	2021 UK Open (England) Milton Keynes	(England) James Wade	(England) Luke Humphries	(Wales) Gerwyn Price (Netherlands) Michael van Gerwen	(Australia) Simon Whitlock (South Africa) Devon Petersen (England) Dave Chisnall (Poland) Krzysztof Ratajski
16 March	2021 PDC Players Championship 5 (England) Milton Keynes	(Northern Ireland) Brendan Dolan	(England) Michael Smith	(England) Joe Cullen (Scotland) Alan Soutar	(England) Ryan Joyce (England) Scott Mitchell (England) Ryan Searle (Netherlands) Dirk van Duijvenbode
17 March	2021 PDC Players Championship 6 (England) Milton Keynes	(Wales) Gerwyn Price	(England) Luke Humphries	(Northern Ireland) Brendan Dolan (England) Jamie Hughes	(England) James Wade (England) Michael Smith (Netherlands) Niels Zonneveld (Netherlands) Dirk van Duijvenbode
18 March	2021 PDC Players Championship 7 (England) Milton Keynes	(Wales) Jonny Clayton	(England) James Wade	(Germany) Gabriel Clemens (England) Jason Heaver	(Lithuania) Darius Labanauskas (England) Chas Barstow (Portugal) José de Sousa (Netherlands) Vincent van der Voort
19 March	2021 PDC Players Championship 8 (England) Milton Keynes	(Scotland) Peter Wright	(Wales) Gerwyn Price	(England) Joe Cullen (Northern Ireland) Brendan Dolan	(Poland) Krzysztof Ratajski (Republic of Ireland) Steve Lennon (Germany) Martin Schindler (England) Jason Lowe

== April ==
Date	Tournament	Champions	Runners-up	Semi-finalists	Quarter-finalists
5 April	2021 Premier League Darts, Night 1 (England) Milton Keynes	Does not apply.			
6 April	2021 Premier League Darts, Night 2 (England) Milton Keynes	Does not apply.			
7 April	2021 Premier League Darts, Night 3 (England) Milton Keynes	Does not apply.			
8 April	2021 Premier League Darts, Night 4 (England) Milton Keynes	Does not apply.			
9 April	2021 Premier League Darts, Night 5 (England) Milton Keynes	Does not apply.			
19 April	2021 Premier League Darts, Night 6 (England) Milton Keynes	Does not apply.			
20 April	2021 Premier League Darts, Night 7 (England) Milton Keynes	Does not apply.			
21 April	2021 Premier League Darts, Night 8 (England) Milton Keynes	Does not apply.			
22 April	2021 Premier League Darts, Night 9 (England) Milton Keynes	Does not apply.			
24 April	2021 EADC Tour 4 (Russia) Moscow	(Russia) Evgeniy Izotov	(Russia) Aleksei Kadochnikov	(Russia) Vitaly Khokhryakov (Russia) Evgeniy Demidenko	(Russia) Dmitriy Gorbunov (Russia) Timofey Samoshkin (Russia) Maxim Aldoshin (Russia) Roman Obukhov
24 April	2021 EADC Tour 5 (Russia) Moscow	(Russia) Dmitriy Gorbunov	(Russia) Vitaly Khokhryakov	(Russia) Evgeniy Zhukov (Russia) Roman Obukhov	(Russia) Evgeniy Demidenko (Russia) Aleksei Kadochnikov (Russia) Dmitry Zhavoronkov (Russia) Igor Shirokiy
24 April	2021 PDC Players Championship 9 (Germany) Niedernhausen	(Portugal) José de Sousa	(England) Luke Humphries	(Belgium) Dimitri Van den Bergh (Poland) Krzysztof Kciuk	(England) Jamie Hughes (England) Jason Lowe (Northern Ireland) Brendan Dolan (England) Alan Tabern
25 April	2021 EADC Tour 6 (Russia) Moscow	(Russia) Dmitriy Gorbunov	(Russia) Evgeniy Izotov	(Russia) Aleksei Kadochnikov (Russia) Artyom Klyuev	(Russia) Evgeniy Demidenko (Russia) Roman Obukhov (Russia) Vitaly Khokhryakov (Russia) Maxim Aldoshin
25 April	2021 PDC Players Championship 10 (Germany) Niedernhausen	(England) Michael Smith	(England) Ross Smith	(Netherlands) Berry van Peer (England) Aaron Beeney	(Portugal) José de Sousa (Republic of Ireland) Steve Lennon (Netherlands) Raymond van Barneveld (Germany) Martin Schindler
26 April	2021 PDC Players Championship 11 (Germany) Niedernhausen	(Netherlands) Dirk van Duijvenbode	(Netherlands) Martijn Kleermaker	(Scotland) Andy Boulton (Northern Ireland) Brendan Dolan	(Australia) Damon Heta (England) Scott Mitchell (England) Rob Cross (England) Ritchie Edhouse
27 April	2021 PDC Players Championship 12 (Germany) Niedernhausen	(Belgium) Dimitri Van den Bergh	(Netherlands) Dirk van Duijvenbode	(Netherlands) Danny Noppert (Scotland) Robert Thornton	(Northern Ireland) Daryl Gurney (England) Scott Mitchell (England) Michael Smith (Australia) Simon Whitlock

== May ==
Date	Tournament	Champions	Runners-up	Semi-finalists	Quarter-finalists
5 May	2021 Premier League Darts, Night 10 (England) Milton Keynes	Does not apply.			
6 May	2021 Premier League Darts, Night 11 (England) Milton Keynes	Does not apply.			
7 May	2021 Premier League Darts, Night 12 (England) Milton Keynes	Does not apply.			
24 May	2021 Premier League Darts, Night 13 (England) Milton Keynes	Does not apply.			
25 May	2021 Premier League Darts, Night 14 (England) Milton Keynes	Does not apply.			
26 May	2021 Premier League Darts, Night 15 (England) Milton Keynes	Does not apply.			
27 May	2021 Premier League Darts, Night 16 (England) Milton Keynes	Does not apply.			
28 May	2021 Premier League Play-Offs (England) Milton Keynes	(Wales) Jonny Clayton	(Portugal) José de Sousa	(Netherlands) Michael van Gerwen (England) Nathan Aspinall	Does not apply.

== June ==
Date	Tournament	Champions	Runners-up	Semi-finalists	Quarter-finalists
14 June	2021 PDC Players Championship 13 (England) Milton Keynes	(England) Joe Cullen	(Wales) Gerwyn Price	(Netherlands) Michael van Gerwen (Wales) Jonny Clayton	(England) James Wade (Netherlands) Martijn Kleermaker (Netherlands) Dirk van Duijvenbode (Scotland) Gary Anderson
15 June	2021 PDC Players Championship 14 (England) Milton Keynes	(Portugal) José de Sousa	(Netherlands) Michael van Gerwen	(Scotland) Gary Anderson (Germany) Gabriel Clemens	(England) Joe Cullen (England) Ted Evetts (Belgium) Dimitri Van den Bergh (England) Ritchie Edhouse
16 June	2021 PDC Players Championship 15 (England) Milton Keynes	(Portugal) José de Sousa	(England) Ryan Searle	(England) Stephen Bunting (England) Rob Cross	(Croatia) Boris Krčmar (England) Adrian Lewis (Wales) Jonny Clayton (Scotland) Peter Wright
17 June	2021 PDC Players Championship 16 (England) Milton Keynes	(Scotland) Peter Wright	(England) Luke Humphries	(England) Callan Rydz (Netherlands) Dirk van Duijvenbode	(England) Adrian Lewis (England) Rob Cross (England) Steve Beaton (Wales) Gerwyn Price

== July ==
Date	Tournament	Champions	Runners-up	Semi-finalists	Quarter-finalists
2 July	2021 PDC European Challenge Tour 1 (Germany) Niedernhausen	(Canada) Matt Campbell	(Netherlands) Gino Vos	(Netherlands) Chris Landman (Belgium) Kenny Neyens	(Sweden) Johan Engström (Germany) Ricardo Pietreczko (Netherlands) Jimmy Hendriks (Belgium) Patrick Bulen
2 July	2021 PDC European Challenge Tour 2 (Germany) Niedernhausen	(Netherlands) Kevin Doets	(Netherlands) Christian Kist	(Germany) Steven Noster (Germany) Lukas Wenig	(Netherlands) Wesley Plaisier (Germany) Franz Rötzsch (Spain) Toni Alcinas (Netherlands) Luc Peters
3 July	2021 PDC European Challenge Tour 3 (Germany) Niedernhausen	(Austria) Rowby-John Rodriguez	(Spain) Toni Alcinas	(Belgium) Kevin Blomme (Netherlands) Richard Veenstra	(Germany) Ricardo Pietreczko (Belgium) François Schweyen (Netherlands) Danny van Trijp (Netherlands) Luc Peters
3 July	2021 PDC European Challenge Tour 4 (Germany) Niedernhausen	(Germany) Steven Noster	(Netherlands) Richard Veenstra	(Netherlands) Davy Proosten (Germany) René Eidams	(Germany) Niko Springer (United States) Gary Mawson (Belgium) Kenny Neyens (Croatia) Pero Ljubić
4 July	2021 PDC European Challenge Tour 5 (Germany) Niedernhausen	(Canada) Matt Campbell	(Netherlands) Jitse van der Wal	(Austria) Rowby-John Rodriguez (Germany) Lukas Wenig	(Netherlands) Maikel Verberk (Netherlands) Chris Landman (Belgium) Mario Vandenbogaerde (Austria) Rusty-Jake Rodriguez
4 July	2021 PDC European Challenge Tour 6 (Germany) Niedernhausen	(Belgium) Kenny Neyens	(Germany) Lukas Wenig	(Belgium) Mario Vandenbogaerde (Belgium) Ronny Huybrechts	(Canada) Matt Campbell (Netherlands) Damian Mol (Germany) Ricardo Pietreczko (Netherlands) Luc Peters
5 July	2021 European Tour 1 – European Associate Member Qualifier (Germany) Niedernhausen	Does not apply.			
5 July	2021 PDC Players Championship 17 (England) Coventry	(England) Stephen Bunting	(Belgium) Dimitri Van den Bergh	(Wales) Gerwyn Price (Portugal) José de Sousa	(Netherlands) Raymond van Barneveld (Netherlands) Michael van Gerwen (England) Mervyn King (Northern Ireland) Brendan Dolan
5 July	2021 European Tour 2 – European Associate Member Qualifier (Germany) Niedernhausen	Does not apply.			
5 July	2021 European Tour 3 – European Associate Member Qualifier (Germany) Niedernhausen	Does not apply.			
6 July	2021 PDC Players Championship 18 (England) Coventry	(England) Chris Dobey	(Portugal) José de Sousa	(England) Ryan Searle (Netherlands) Maik Kuivenhoven	(England) Mervyn King (Croatia) Boris Krčmar (England) Stephen Bunting (England) Scott Mitchell
7 July	2021 PDC Players Championship 19 (England) Coventry	(England) Ross Smith	(Northern Ireland) Brendan Dolan	(England) Ryan Joyce (Belgium) Dimitri Van den Bergh	(England) Keegan Brown (Scotland) Gary Anderson (England) Nathan Aspinall (England) Michael Smith
8 July	2021 PDC Players Championship 20 (England) Coventry	(Scotland) Peter Wright	(Netherlands) Michael van Gerwen	(Portugal) José de Sousa (England) James Wade	(England) Chas Barstow (England) Michael Smith (Wales) Gerwyn Price (Netherlands) Danny Noppert
9 July	2021 European Tour 1 – Tour Card Qualifier (England) Coventry	Does not apply.			
9 July	2021 European Tour 2 – Tour Card Qualifier (England) Coventry	Does not apply.			
9 July	2021 European Tour 3 – Tour Card Qualifier (England) Coventry	Does not apply.			
9 July	2021 CDC USA Tour 1 (United States) Tampa	(United States) Danny Lauby	(United States) Leonard Gates	(United States) Darin Young (United States) Chuck Puleo	(United States) Alex Reyes (United States) Jake Womack (United States) Chris White (United States) Chris Lim
10 July	2021 CDC USA Tour 2 (United States) Tampa	(United States) Danny Lauby	(United States) Gary Mawson	(United States) Chris Lim (United States) Chuck Puleo	(United States) Alex Spellman (United States) Leonard Gates (United States) Bruce Robbins (United States) Nick Linberg
11 July	2021 CDC USA Tour 3 (United States) Tampa	(United States) Leonard Gates	(United States) Danny Lauby	(United States) Jeff Springer (United States) Nick Linberg	(United States) Alex Spellman (United States) Gary Mawson (United States) Chris White (United States) Joe Beecroft
17–25 July	2021 World Matchplay (England) Blackpool	(Scotland) Peter Wright	(Belgium) Dimitri Van den Bergh	(Poland) Krzysztof Ratajski (Netherlands) Michael van Gerwen	(Wales) Gerwyn Price (England) Callan Rydz (England) Michael Smith (England) Nathan Aspinall

== August ==
Date	Tournament	Champions	Runners-up	Semi-finalists	Quarter-finalists
2 August	2021 PDC Players Championship 21 (England) Barnsley	(Wales) Gerwyn Price	(Australia) Damon Heta	(England) Ian White (Poland) Krzysztof Ratajski	(Wales) Lewy Williams (England) Callan Rydz (England) Ritchie Edhouse (England) Rob Cross
3 August	2021 PDC Players Championship 22 (England) Barnsley	(England) Ryan Searle	(Scotland) Peter Wright	(Belgium) Dimitri Van den Bergh (England) Martin Lukeman	(Netherlands) Vincent van der Voort (Germany) Martin Schindler (Republic of Ireland) Keane Barry (England) Luke Woodhouse
4 August	2021 PDC Players Championship 23 (England) Barnsley	(Scotland) Peter Wright	(Wales) Jonny Clayton	(England) Jamie Hughes (England) James Wade	(Northern Ireland) Daryl Gurney (Germany) Martin Schindler (England) Luke Humphries (England) Ryan Searle
6 August	2021 PDC UK Challenge Tour 1 (England) Milton Keynes	(Scotland) Darren Beveridge	(Wales) Martin Thomas	(England) Conan Whitehead (England) Connor Scutt	(England) Nick Fullwell (England) Keelan Kay (England) Matthew Dennant (England) Richard North
6 August	2021 PDC UK Challenge Tour 2 (England) Milton Keynes	(Wales) Jim Williams	(England) Adam Smith-Neale	(England) Carl Beattie (Northern Ireland) Nathan Rafferty	(England) James Richardson (Northern Ireland) Kevin Burness (England) Tony Newell (Scotland) Darren Beveridge
7 August	2021 PDC UK Challenge Tour 3 (England) Milton Keynes	(Scotland) Jim McEwan	(Wales) Jim Williams	(England) Colin Osborne (England) Chas Barstow	(England) Reece Robinson (England) Carl Wilkinson (England) Ryan Harrington (Wales) Richie Burnett
7 August	2021 PDC UK Challenge Tour 4 (England) Milton Keynes	(England) Adam Smith-Neale	(Northern Ireland) Gavin Carlin	(Scotland) Robert Thornton (England) Ryan Furness	(Scotland) Shaun McDonald (England) Keelan Kay (Wales) Jim Williams (England) Carl Wilkinson
8 August	2021 PDC UK Challenge Tour 5 (England) Milton Keynes	(Scotland) Shaun McDonald	(Scotland) Nathan Girvan	(England) Kyle Richardson (Northern Ireland) Kevin Burness	(England) Robert Collins (England) Colin Osborne (England) Kevin Garcia (England) Carl Beattie
8 August	2021 PDC UK Challenge Tour 6 (England) Milton Keynes	(Scotland) Jamie Clark	(England) Ryan Palmer	(Northern Ireland) Gavin Carlin (England) Lewis Pride	(England) Robbie Ellis (England) Jamie Robinson (England) John Bowles (Wales) Jim Williams
9 August	2021 European Tour 1 – UK Associate Member Qualifier (England) Milton Keynes	Does not apply.			
9 August	2021 European Tour 2 – UK Associate Member Qualifier (England) Milton Keynes	Does not apply.			
13 August	2021 CDC Canada Tour 1 (Canada) Moncton	(Canada) David Cameron	(Canada) Jacob Taylor	(Canada) Cory Tkach (Canada) Dave Richardson	(Canada) John Norman Jnr (Canada) Jeff Smith (Canada) Matt Campbell (Canada) Kiley Edmunds
14 August	2021 CDC Canada Tour 2 (Canada) Moncton	(Canada) Matt Campbell	(Canada) Jeff Smith	(Canada) Jacob Taylor (Canada) Shawn Brenneman	(Canada) Jim Long (Canada) Dave Richardson (Canada) David Cameron (Canada) Kiley Edmunds
15 August	2021 CDC Canada Tour 3 (Canada) Moncton	(Canada) Jeff Smith	(Canada) John Norman Jnr	(Canada) Jacob Taylor (Canada) Jim Long	(Canada) Ben Garner (Canada) Dave Richardson (Canada) David Cameron (Canada) Darryl Christie
19 August	2021 PDC Nordic & Baltic Tour 1 (Iceland) Reykjavík	(Sweden) Daniel Larsson	(Finland) Marko Kantele	(Latvia) Madars Razma (Lithuania) Darius Labanauskas	(Denmark) Ivan Springborg (Sweden) Johan Engström (Sweden) Dennis Nilsson (Denmark) Andreas Toft Jørgensen
20 August	2021 PDC European Development Tour 1 (Germany) Niedernhausen	(Netherlands) Jurjen van der Velde	(Netherlands) Bradly Roes	(Netherlands) Gian van Veen (Netherlands) Mark Tabak	(Netherlands) Maikel Verberk (Netherlands) Mike van Duivenbode (Netherlands) Damian Mol (Germany) Joshua Hermann
20 August	2021 PDC UK Development Tour 1 (England) Milton Keynes	(England) Reece Colley	(England) Dom Taylor	(England) Cameron Anderson (England) Joshua Richardson	(Republic of Ireland) Jordan Boyce (Gibraltar) Justin Hewitt (Wales) Rory Jolly (England) Bradley Brooks
20 August	2021 PDC Nordic & Baltic Tour 2 (Iceland) Reykjavík	(Latvia) Madars Razma	(Sweden) Daniel Larsson	(Sweden) Johan Engström (Finland) Marko Kantele	(Denmark) Ivan Springborg (Lithuania) Darius Labanauskas (Denmark) Bent Lambertsen (Sweden) Dennis Nilsson
20 August	2021 PDC European Development Tour 2 (Germany) Niedernhausen	(Austria) Rusty-Jake Rodriguez	(Netherlands) Jeroen Mioch	(Germany) Niko Springer (Netherlands) Maikel Verberk	(Netherlands) Youri Brouwer (Netherlands) Joost Geurts (Czech Republic) Tomáš Houdek (Poland) Sebastian Białecki
20 August	2021 PDC UK Development Tour 2 (England) Milton Keynes	(England) Keelan Kay	(England) Dom Taylor	(England) Fred Box (Wales) Liam Meek	(Scotland) Leighton Calder (England) Bradley Coltman (Republic of Ireland) Conor Heneghan (Northern Ireland) Nathan Rafferty
20 August	2021 PDC Nordic & Baltic Tour 3 (Iceland) Reykjavík	(Denmark) Andreas Toft Jørgensen	(Lithuania) Darius Labanauskas	(Denmark) Ivan Springborg (Latvia) Madars Razma	(Latvia) Nauris Gleglu (Sweden) Johan Engström (Finland) Marko Kantele (Sweden) Dennis Nilsson
21 August	2021 PDC European Development Tour 3 (Germany) Niedernhausen	(Netherlands) Kevin Doets	(Netherlands) Mike van Duivenbode	(Netherlands) Bradly Roes (Netherlands) Jurjen van der Velde	(Germany) Tobias Scheifl (Netherlands) Youri Brouwer (Netherlands) Maikel Verberk (Netherlands) Niels Zonneveld
21 August	2021 PDC UK Development Tour 3 (England) Milton Keynes	(England) Dom Taylor	(England) Jack Male	(Scotland) Nathan Grivan (Wales) Liam Meek	(England) Alex Jacques (England) Harry Jackson (England) Lewis Gurney (Gibraltar) Craig Galliano
21 August	2021 PDC Nordic & Baltic Tour 4 (Iceland) Reykjavík	(Finland) Marko Kantele	(Denmark) Niels Heinsøe	(Sweden) Dennis Nilson (Sweden) Johan Engström	(Sweden) Daniel Larsson (Lithuania) Darius Labanauskas (Latvia) Madars Razma (Denmark) Ivan Springborg
21 August	2021 PDC European Development Tour 4 (Germany) Niedernhausen	(Netherlands) Niels Zonneveld	(Netherlands) Geert Nentjes	(Netherlands) Gillian Koehoorn (Germany) Nico Kurz	(Austria) Rusty-Jake Rodriguez (Netherlands) Joost Geurts (Netherlands) Mike van Duivenbode (Czech Republic) Adam Gawlas
21 August	2021 PDC UK Development Tour 4 (England) Milton Keynes	(Wales) Liam Meek	(England) Dom Taylor	(England) Keelan Kay (Wales) Lewy Williams	(England) Jarred Cole (England) Cameron Anderson (Gibraltar) Craig Galliano (Scotland) Nathan Girvan
21 August	2021 PDC Nordic & Baltic Tour 5 (Iceland) Reykjavík	(Latvia) Madars Razma	(Sweden) Daniel Larsson	(Finland) Marko Kantele (Denmark) Andreas Toft Jørgensen	(Sweden) Dennis Nilsson (Denmark) Niels Heinsøe (Sweden) Johan Engström (Denmark) Henrik Primdal
22 August	2021 PDC European Development Tour 5 (Germany) Niedernhausen	(Austria) Rusty-Jake Rodriguez	(Netherlands) Niels Zonneveld	(Netherlands) Gillian Koehoorn (Netherlands) Mike van Duivenbode	(Germany) Kevin Luhr (Czech Republic) Tomáš Houdek (Netherlands) Geert Nentjes (Germany) Tobias Scheifl
22 August	2021 PDC UK Development Tour 5 (England) Milton Keynes	(Northern Ireland) Nathan Rafferty	(England) Daniel Perry	(England) Cameron Anderson (Wales) Justin Smith	(England) Alex Jacques (England) Bradley Brooks (Republic of Ireland) Adam Dee (England) Jarred Cole
22 August	2021 PDC European Development Tour 6 (Germany) Niedernhausen	(Austria) Rusty-Jake Rodriguez	(Germany) Niko Springer	(Netherlands) Jurjen van der Velde (Netherlands) Kevin Doets	(Netherlands) Geert Nentjes (Netherlands) Gian van Veen (Poland) Sebastian Białecki (Netherlands) Jeroen Mioch
22 August	2021 PDC UK Development Tour 6 (England) Milton Keynes	(England) Bradley Brooks	(England) Ted Evetts	(Republic of Ireland) Conor Heneghan (Republic of Ireland) Keane Barry	(England) Keelan Kay (Wales) Rhys Griffin (England) Reece Colley (England) Oliver King
22 August	2021 Nordic Darts Masters – Nordic & Baltic Qualifier (Iceland) Reykjavík	Does not apply.			

== September ==
Date	Tournament	Champions	Runners-up	Semi-finalists	Quarter-finalists
3 September	2021 PDC European Challenge Tour 7 (Germany) Niedernhausen	(Spain) José Justicia	(Germany) Niko Springer	(Netherlands) Damian Mol (Netherlands) Davy Proosten	(Austria) Rowby-John Rodriguez (Netherlands) Jeremy van der Winkel (Germany) Franz Rötzsch (Netherlands) Gian van Veen
3 September	2021 PDC UK Challenge Tour 7 (England) Milton Keynes	(Wales) Martin Thomas	(Scotland) Shaun McDonald	(England) Steve Hine (England) Reece Robinson	(Scotland) Jamie Clark (England) Lloyd Pennell (Scotland) Robert Thornton (Wales) Justin Smith
3–5 September	2021 Hungarian Darts Trophy (Hungary) Budapest	(Wales) Gerwyn Price	(England) Michael Smith	(England) Luke Humphries (Portugal) José de Sousa	(England) Joe Cullen (Northern Ireland) Brendan Dolan (Czech Republic) Adam Gawlas (Scotland) Peter Wright
3 September	2021 PDC European Challenge Tour 8 (Germany) Niedernhausen	(Spain) Toni Alcinas	(Netherlands) Jimmy Hendriks	(Austria) Rowby-John Rodriguez (Belgium) Kenny Neyens	(Netherlands) Marvin van Velzen (Netherlands) Wesley Plaisier (Belgium) Mario Vandenbogaerde (Netherlands) Arjan Konterman
3 September	2021 PDC UK Challenge Tour 8 (England) Milton Keynes	(England) Matthew Dennant	(Scotland) Darren Beveridge	(Wales) Richie Burnett (England) Keelan Kay	(Northern Ireland) Nathan Rafferty (Scotland) Jason Hogg (England) David Wawrzewski (England) Adam Huckvale
4 September	2021 PDC European Challenge Tour 9 (Germany) Niedernhausen	(Germany) Steven Noster	(Netherlands) Jimmy Hendriks	(Spain) José Justicia (Belgium) Brian Raman	(Germany) Ricardo Pietreczko (Netherlands) Chris Landman (Austria) Michael Rasztovits (Belgium) Kevin Blomme
4 September	2021 PDC UK Challenge Tour 9 (England) Milton Keynes	(England) Reece Robinson	(United States) Danny Lauby	(England) Connor Scutt (Scotland) Cameron Menzies	(England) David Pallett (Republic of Ireland) Niall Culleton (Scotland) Neil MacDougall (Wales) Richie Burnett
4 September	2021 PDC European Challenge Tour 10 (Germany) Niedernhausen	(Poland) Sebastian Białecki	(Netherlands) Kevin Doets	(Austria) Michael Rasztovits (France) Thibaut Tricole	(Netherlands) Christian Kist (Spain) José Justicia (Austria) Rowby-John Rodriguez (Germany) Lukas Wenig
4 September	2021 PDC UK Challenge Tour 10 (England) Milton Keynes	(Northern Ireland) Nathan Rafferty	(England) Robert Rickwood	(England) Connor Scutt (England) Adam Mould	(England) Stu Wilson (England) Arron Monk (England) Robert Collins (England) Jarred Cole
5 September	2021 PDC European Challenge Tour 11 (Germany) Niedernhausen	(Canada) Matt Campbell	(Netherlands) Wesley Plaiser	(Netherlands) Danny van Trijp (Germany) Marcel Gerdon	(Netherlands) Martijn Dragt (Netherlands) Kevin Doets (Germany) Ricardo Pietreczko (Netherlands) Luc Peters
5 September	2021 PDC UK Challenge Tour 11 (England) Milton Keynes	(England) James Richardson	(Scotland) Jason Hogg	(Wales) Martin Thomas (England) Kevin Garcia	(England) Robert Collins (Scotland) Cameron Menzies (Wales) Justin Smith (England) Keelan Kay
5 September	2021 PDC European Challenge Tour 12 (Germany) Niedernhausen	(Netherlands) Luc Peters	(Belgium) Kevin Blomme	(Switzerland) Thomas Junghans (Netherlands) Christian Kist	(Netherlands) Kevin Doets (Netherlands) Jimmy Hendriks (Austria) Michael Rasztovits (France) Thibaut Tricole
5 September	2021 PDC UK Challenge Tour 12 (England) Milton Keynes	(Scotland) Cameron Menzies	(Wales) Derek Coulson	(Wales) Richie Burnett (England) Nick Fulwell	(England) Carl Wilkinson (Scotland) Jim McEwan (England) Scott Taylor (Republic of Ireland) John O'Shea
9–12 September	2021 PDC World Cup of Darts (Germany) Jena	(Scotland) Wright/Henderson	(Austria) Suljović/Rodriguez	(England) Wade/Chisnall (Wales) Price/Clayton	(Germany) Clemens/Hopp (Northern Ireland) Gurney/Dolan (Australia) Whitlock/Heta (Netherlands) van Gerwen/van Duijvenbode
17–18 September	2021 Nordic Darts Masters (Denmark) Copenhagen	(Netherlands) Michael van Gerwen	(England) Fallon Sherrock	(Belgium) Dimitri Van den Bergh (Wales) Jonny Clayton	(Wales) Gerwyn Price (Scotland) Gary Anderson (Scotland) Peter Wright (Latvia) Madars Razma
17 September	2021 CDC USA Tour 4 (United States) Philadelphia	(United States) Adam Sevada	(United States) Stephen Phillips	(United States) Gary Mawson (Republic of Ireland) Gary French	(United States) Jules van Dongen (United States) Bruce Robbins (United States) Larry Butler (United States) Robbie Phillips
18 September	2021 CDC USA Tour 5 (United States) Philadelphia	(United States) Seth Steffano	(United States) Jules van Dongen	(United States) Leonard Gates (United States) Chuck Puleo	(United States) Jeremiah Millar (United States) Gary Mawson (United States) Alex Spellman (United States) Danny Baggish
19 September	2021 CDC USA Tour 6 (United States) Philadelphia	(United States) Kevin Luke	(United States) Jules van Dongen	(United States) Jeremiah Millar (United States) Chuck Puleo	(United States) Joey Lynaugh (United States) Danny Baggish (United States) Danny Lauby (United States) Leonard Gates
24–26 September	2021 Gibraltar Darts Trophy Gibraltar	(Wales) Gerwyn Price	(Austria) Mensur Suljović	(England) Nathan Aspinall (Australia) Simon Whitlock	(England) James Wade (Netherlands) Michael van Gerwen (Poland) Krzysztof Ratajski (Northern Ireland) Brendan Dolan
25 September	2021 PDC Women's Series 1 (England) Milton Keynes	(England) Lisa Ashton	(Wales) Rhian O'Sullivan	(England) Roz Bulmer (Russia) Anastasia Dobromyslova	(England) Deta Hedman (Japan) Mikuru Suzuki (England) Kirsty Hutchinson (England) Lorraine Winstanley
25 September	2021 PDC Women's Series 2 (England) Milton Keynes	(England) Fallon Sherrock	(Australia) Corrine Hammond	(England) Deta Hedman (England) Joanne Locke	(Scotland) Lorraine Hyde (Northern Ireland) Denise Cassidy (England) Roz Bulmer (England) Lisa Ashton
25 September	2021 PDC Women's Series 3 (England) Milton Keynes	(England) Fallon Sherrock	(England) Deta Hedman	(England) Joanne Locke (Russia) Anastasia Dobromyslova	(Japan) Mikuru Suzuki (Sweden) Vicky Pruim (England) Laura Turner (Australia) Corrine Hammond
26 September	2021 PDC Women's Series 4 (England) Milton Keynes	(England) Lisa Ashton	(England) Fallon Sherrock	(England) Trina Gulliver (England) Deta Hedman	(Wales) Tracey Davies (England) Louise Pearson (England) Laura Turner (Wales) Rhian O'Sullivan
26 September	2021 PDC Women's Series 5 (England) Milton Keynes	(England) Lisa Ashton	(England) Fallon Sherrock	(Scotland) Lorraine Hyde (Russia) Anastasia Dobromyslova	(England) Kirsty Hutchinson (England) Amanda Harwood (England) Deta Hedman (England) Roz Bulmer
26 September	2021 PDC Women's Series 6 (England) Milton Keynes	(England) Fallon Sherrock	(England) Lisa Ashton	(Japan) Mikuru Suzuki (England) Laura Turner	(England) Jo Clements (England) Kirsty Hutchinson (Russia) Anastasia Dobromyslova (Wales) Rhian O'Sullivan

== October ==
Date	Tournament	Champions	Runners-up	Semi-finalists	Quarter-finalists
3–9 October	2021 World Grand Prix (England) Leicester	(Wales) Jonny Clayton	(Wales) Gerwyn Price	(England) Stephen Bunting (Netherlands) Danny Noppert	(England) Dave Chisnall (England) Ryan Searle (Poland) Krzysztof Ratajski (England) Ian White
14–17 October	2021 European Championship (Austria) Salzburg	Rob Cross	Michael van Gerwen	Nathan Aspinall; Joe Cullen	Gerwyn Price; Danny Noppert; Mensur Suljović; José de Sousa
18 October	2021 World Series of Darts Finals Tour Card Qualifier (England) Barnsley	Does not apply.			
19 October	2021 PDC Players Championship 24 (England) Barnsley	(Belgium) Dimitri Van den Bergh	(England) Adrian Lewis	(Belgium) Kim Huybrechts (England) Dave Chisnall	(Northern Ireland) Mickey Mansell (England) Rob Cross (Poland) Krzysztof Ratajski (England) Ryan Searle
20 October	2021 PDC Players Championship 25 (England) Barnsley	(England) Callan Rydz	(Germany) Gabriel Clemens	(England) Chris Dobey (Netherlands) Dirk van Duijvenbode	(England) Steve Brown (England) Ryan Meikle (England) Mervyn King (Netherlands) Maik Kuivenhoven
21 October	2021 PDC Players Championship 26 (England) Barnsley	(England) Rob Cross	(England) Ryan Searle	(Latvia) Madars Razma (England) Nathan Aspinall	(England) Luke Woodhouse (Netherlands) Vincent van der Voort (Netherlands) Dirk van Duijvenbode (England) Michael Smith
22 October	2021 PDC Players Championship 27 (England) Barnsley	(England) Michael Smith	(England) Ross Smith	(England) Rob Cross (Germany) Florian Hempel	(Australia) Damon Heta (Northern Ireland) Brendan Dolan (England) Nathan Aspinall (Belgium) Kim Huybrechts
22 October	2021 CDC Canada Tour 4 (Canada) Cambridge	(Canada) John Norman Jnr	(Canada) Matt Campbell	(Canada) Kiley Edmunds (Canada) Jacob Taylor	(Canada) David Cameron (Canada) Dave Richardson (Canada) Jim Long (Canada) Justin Fawcett
23 October	2021 PDC Women's Series 7 (England) Barnsley	(England) Fallon Sherrock	(Japan) Mikuru Suzuki	(England) Lorraine Winstanley (Australia) Corrine Hammond	(Northern Ireland) Denise Cassidy (England) Lisa Ashton (Republic of Ireland) Katie Sheldon (England) Trina Gulliver
23 October	2021 PDC Women's Series 8 (England) Barnsley	(England) Lisa Ashton	(England) Fallon Sherrock	(England) Tracy North (England) Joanne Locke	(Northern Ireland) Denise Cassidy (Australia) Corrine Hammond (Japan) Mikuru Suzuki (England) Deta Hedman
23 October	2021 PDC Women's Series 9 (England) Barnsley	(England) Fallon Sherrock	(England) Lisa Ashton	(England) Deta Hedman (Republic of Ireland) Katie Sheldon	(England) Donna-Maria Rainsley (Russia) Anastasia Dobromyslova (Northern Ireland) Denise Cassidy (England) Trina Gulliver
23 October	2021 CDC Canada Tour 5 (Canada) Cambridge	(Canada) John Norman Jnr	(Canada) Ross Snook	(Canada) Dave Richardson (Canada) Shaun Narain	(Canada) Jacob Taylor (Canada) Keith Way (Canada) David Cameron (Canada) Kiley Edmunds
24 October	2021 PDC Women's Series 10 (England) Barnsley	(England) Lisa Ashton	(Russia) Anastasia Dobromyslova	(Wales) Rhian O'Sullivan (England) Trina Gulliver	(England) Fallon Sherrock (England) Tracy North (Australia) Corrine Hammond (England) Rachel Brooks
24 October	2021 PDC Women's Series 11 (England) Barnsley	(England) Fallon Sherrock	(England) Deta Hedman	(England) Trina Gulliver (England) Rachel Brooks	(Wales) Chris Savvery (England) Lisa Ashton (England) Lorraine Winstanley (Russia) Anastasia Dobromyslova
24 October	2021 PDC Women's Series 12 (England) Barnsley	(Japan) Mikuru Suzuki	(England) Lisa Ashton	(Australia) Corrine Hammond (England) Lorraine Winstanley	(Republic of Ireland) Robyn Byrne (England) Margaret Sutton (Northern Ireland) Denise Cassidy (England) Joanne Locke
24 October	2021 CDC Canada Tour 6 (Canada) Cambridge	(Canada) Jacob Taylor	(Canada) Matt Campbell	(Canada) Dave Richardson (Canada) Kiley Edmunds	(Canada) Oliver Jones (Canada) John Norman Jnr (Canada) Jason Roker (Canada) Shaun Narain
29 October	2021 PDC UK Development Tour 7 (England) Barnsley	(England) Ted Evetts	(Northern Ireland) Nathan Rafferty	(Republic of Ireland) Keane Barry (England) Ben West	(England) Christopher Blyth (Wales) Connor Hopkins (England) Jarred Cole (England) Bradley Brooks
29 October	2021 PDC UK Development Tour 8 (England) Barnsley	(England) Bradley Brooks	(England) Jarred Cole	(England) Jacob Gwynne (Wales) Liam Meek	(Wales) Justin Smith (England) Bradley Coltman (England) Jack Dickinson (England) Lewis Gurney
29–31 October	2021 World Series of Darts Finals (Netherlands) Amsterdam	(Wales) Jonny Clayton	(Belgium) Dimitri Van den Bergh	(Netherlands) Michael van Gerwen (Poland) Krzysztof Ratajski	(England) Mervyn King (Wales) Gerwyn Price (Netherlands) Niels Zonneveld (Belgium) Kim Huybrechts
30 October	2021 PDC UK Development Tour 9 (England) Barnsley	(England) Keelan Kay	(Republic of Ireland) Killian Heffernan	(Republic of Ireland) Ciarán Teehan (Republic of Ireland) Conor Heneghan	(England) Connor Arberry (Republic of Ireland) Keane Barry (England) Owen Maiden (Wales) Cavan Phillips
30 October	2021 PDC UK Development Tour 10 (England) Barnsley	(England) Reece Colley	(England) Lewis Pride	(Wales) Cavan Phillips (Northern Ireland) Nathan Rafferty	(Wales) Justin Smith (England) Nathan Potter (England) Bradley Brooks (England) Jarred Cole
31 October	2021 PDC UK Development Tour 11 (England) Barnsley	(Northern Ireland) Nathan Rafferty	(England) Ted Evetts	(Wales) Llew Bevan (England) Bradley Brooks	(England) Owen Maiden (Wales) Liam Meek (England) Tyler Radlett (England) Charlie Manby
31 October	2021 PDC UK Development Tour 12 (England) Barnsley	(England) Bradley Brooks	(England) Keelan Kay	(England) Jimmy Bristow (England) Joshua Richardson	(Republic of Ireland) Ciarán Teehan (England) Dom Taylor (England) Ben West (Republic of Ireland) Jordan Boyce

== November ==
Date	Tournament	Champions	Runners-up	Semi-finalists	Quarter-finalists
2 November	2021 PDC Players Championship 28 (England) Barnsley	(England) Chris Dobey	(England) Ryan Searle	(England) Dave Chisnall (England) Rob Cross	(Germany) Gabriel Clemens (Netherlands) Michael van Gerwen (Portugal) José de Sousa (Scotland) Alan Soutar
3 November	2021 PDC Players Championship 29 (England) Barnsley	(Netherlands) Michael van Gerwen	(England) Nathan Aspinall	(Australia) Damon Heta (Republic of Ireland) William O'Connor	(Netherlands) Jelle Klaasen (Poland) Krzysztof Ratajski (England) Ryan Searle (Belgium) Kim Huybrechts
4 November	2021 PDC Players Championship 30 (England) Barnsley	(Poland) Krzysztof Ratajski	(England) Joe Cullen	(Netherlands) Michael van Gerwen (Lithuania) Darius Labanauskas	(England) Matthew Edgar (Netherlands) Danny Noppert (England) James Wade (Wales) Jonny Clayton
5 November	2021 Grand Slam of Darts Tour Card Qualifier (England) Barnsley	Does not apply.			
5 November	2021 PDC European Development Tour 7 (Germany) Niedernhausen	(Austria) Rusty-Jake Rodriguez	(Germany) Fabian Schmutzler	(Netherlands) Joey de Jong (Netherlands) Geert Nentjes	(Czech Republic) Roman Benecký (Netherlands) Keanu van Velzen (Poland) Sebastian Białecki (Netherlands) Mike van Duivenbode
5 November	2021 PDC European Development Tour 8 (Germany) Niedernhausen	(Poland) Sebastian Białecki	(Netherlands) Geert Nentjes	(Czech Republic) Roman Benecký (Austria) Rusty-Jake Rodriguez	(Czech Republic) Tomáš Houdek (Netherlands) Owen Roelofs (Netherlands) Maikel Verberk (Czech Republic) Adam Gawlas
6 November	2021 PDC European Development Tour 9 (Germany) Niedernhausen	(Austria) Rusty-Jake Rodriguez	(Germany) Niko Springer	(Germany) Fabian Schmutzler (Czech Republic) Roman Benecký	(Poland) Sebastian Białecki (Netherlands) Lars Fransen (Czech Republic) Adam Gawlas (Netherlands) Owen Roelofs
6 November	2021 PDC European Development Tour 10 (Germany) Niedernhausen	(Germany) Fabian Schmutzler	(Germany) Marcel Gerdon	(Austria) Rusty-Jake Rodriguez (Luxembourg) Alex Flohr	(Czech Republic) Roman Benecký (Germany) Niko Springer (Netherlands) Lars Plaisier (Netherlands) Geert Nentjes
7 November	2021 PDC European Development Tour 11 (Germany) Niedernhausen	(Germany) Fabian Schmutzler	(Czech Republic) Adam Gawlas	(Netherlands) Owen Roelofs (Czech Republic) Tomáš Houdek	(Germany) Simon Schreier (Netherlands) Geert Nentjes (Netherlands) Gijsbert van Malsen (Netherlands) Damian Mol
7 November	2021 PDC European Development Tour 12 (Germany) Niedernhausen	(Germany) Nico Kurz	(Germany) Dominik Grüllich	(Germany) Fabian Schmutzler (Netherlands) Maikel Verberk	(Netherlands) Jurjen van der Velde (Poland) Sebastian Białecki (Germany) Kevin Luhr (Austria) Rusty-Jake Rodriguez
13–21 November	2021 Grand Slam of Darts (England) Wolverhampton	(Wales) Gerwyn Price	(Scotland) Peter Wright	(England) James Wade (England) Michael Smith	(Wales) Jonny Clayton (England) Rob Cross (England) Fallon Sherrock (Netherlands) Michael van Gerwen
26–28 November	2021 Players Championship Finals (England) Minehead	(Scotland) Peter Wright	(England) Ryan Searle	(Northern Ireland) Brendan Dolan (Wales) Jonny Clayton	(Portugal) José de Sousa (Northern Ireland) Daryl Gurney (Netherlands) Michael van Gerwen (Netherlands) Vincent van der Voort
28 November	2021 PDC World Youth Championship (England) Minehead	(England) Ted Evetts	(Northern Ireland) Nathan Rafferty	(Netherlands) Geert Nentjes (Netherlands) Kevin Doets	(Czech Republic) Adam Gawlas (Republic of Ireland) Keane Barry (Austria) Rusty-Jake Rodriguez (England) Keelan Kay
29 November	2022 World Darts Championship Tour Card Qualifier (England) Barnsley	Does not apply.			

== December ==
Date	Tournament	Champions	Runners-up	Semi-finalists	Quarter-finalists
15 December–3 January	2022 PDC World Darts Championship (England) London	(Scotland) Peter Wright	(England) Michael Smith	(England) James Wade (Scotland) Gary Anderson	(Wales) Gerwyn Price (England) Mervyn King (England) Callan Rydz (England) Luke Humphries

== See also ==
- List of players with a 2021 PDC Tour Card
- 2021 PDC Pro Tour
