= Willard Bruguier =

American darts player (born 1981)

Personal information
- Full name: Willard Bruguier III
- Nickname: "Willie J"
- Born: December 4, 1981 (age 44) Indianapolis, Indiana, U.S.
- Home town: Wagner, South Dakota, U.S.

Sport
- Sport: Darts
- Playing since: 2001
- Darts: 23g One80
- Laterality: Right-handed
- Walk-on music: "Boulevard of Broken Dreams" by Green Day

Organisation (see split in darts)
- PDC: 2016–2018

WDF major events – best performances
- World Masters: Last 144: 2016

PDC premier events – best performances
- World Championship: Last 72: 2018

Other tournament wins
- Years
North American Darts Championship	2017

Willard Bruguier III (/ˈbruːjʌr/ born December 4, 1981) is an American former professional darts player from South Dakota who has played in the Professional Darts Corporation (PDC) events.

== Career ==
A police officer by profession, Bruguier entered the 2017 US Darts Masters qualifiers and won the 2nd qualifier to claim a place in the North American Championship. After defeating DJ Sayre in the quarter-final and Dawson Murschell in the semi-finals, he defeated the veteran Dave Richardson in a last leg decider to book his place in the 2018 PDC World Darts Championship, where he lost to Cody Harris of New Zealand in the preliminary round.

== World Championship results ==
=== PDC ===
- 2018: Preliminary round (lost to Cody Harris 1–2) (sets)

== Performance timeline ==
PDC

Tournament	2018
PDC World Championship	PR
