= 2018 US Darts Masters =

2018 William Hill US Darts Masters

Tournament information
- Dates: 6–7 July 2018
- Venue: Mandalay Bay
- Location: Las Vegas
- Country: United States
- Organisation(s): PDC
- Format: Legs
- Prize fund: £60,000
- Winner's share: £20,000
- High checkout: 164 (Scotland) Gary Anderson

Champion(s)
- (Scotland) Gary Anderson

The 2018 William Hill US Darts Masters was the second staging of the tournament by the Professional Darts Corporation. It was the second event in the 2018 World Series of Darts. The tournament featured 16 players (8 PDC representatives and 8 North American representatives) and was held at the Mandalay Bay in Las Vegas on 6–7 July 2018.

Michael van Gerwen was the defending champion after defeating Daryl Gurney 8–6 in the 2017 final. However, he lost 8–3 in the quarter-finals to James Wade.

Gary Anderson won his sixth World Series title after beating Rob Cross 8–4 in the final.

== Prize money ==
The total prize fund was £60,000.

Position (no. of players)		Prize money (Total: £60,000)
Winner	(1)	£20,000
Runner-up	(1)	£10,000
Semi-finalists	(2)	£5,000
Quarter-finalists	(4)	£2,500
First round	(8)	£1,250

== Qualifiers ==
The eight PDC representatives are:

1. (Scotland) Peter Wright (semi-finals)
2. (Scotland) Gary Anderson (winner)
3. (Netherlands) Michael van Gerwen (quarter-finals)
4. (England) Rob Cross (runner-up)
5. (Northern Ireland) Daryl Gurney (quarter-finals)
6. (England) Michael Smith (quarter-finals)
7. (England) James Wade (semi-finals)
8. (Wales) Gerwyn Price (first round)

The North American qualifier winners were:

- (United States) DJ Sayre (first round)
- (Canada) John Norman Jnr (first round)
- (Canada) Jeff Smith (first round)
- (United States) Dan Lauby Jr (first round)

The top 4 North American Order of Merit qualifiers were:

- (United States) Joe Huffman (first round)
- (Canada) David Cameron (first round)
- (Canada) Dawson Murschell (quarter-finals)
- (Canada) Ross Snook (first round)

== Bracket ==
First round (best of 11 legs); 6 July
1	(Scotland) Peter Wright 89.52	6
(United States) Joseph Huffman 87.08	4
(Northern Ireland) Daryl Gurney 98.37	6
(Canada) John Norman Jnr 93.41	2
4	(England) Rob Cross 105.73	6
(Canada) Ross Snook 85.19	1
(England) Michael Smith 91.25	6
(Canada) David Cameron 82.34	1
2	(Scotland) Gary Anderson 112.63	6
(United States) DJ Sayre 85.45	1
(Wales) Gerwyn Price 87.44	2
(Canada) Dawson Murschell 84.94	6
3	(Netherlands) Michael van Gerwen 101.33	6
(Canada) Jeff Smith 87.46	0
(England) James Wade 92.51	6
(United States) Dan Lauby Jr 90.63	5

Quarter-finals (best of 15 legs); 7 July
1	(Scotland) Peter Wright 88.08	8
(Northern Ireland) Daryl Gurney 85.10	6
4	(England) Rob Cross 100.91	8
(England) Michael Smith 99.17	6
2	(Scotland) Gary Anderson 97.52	8
(Canada) Dawson Murschell 82.45	5
3	(Netherlands) Michael van Gerwen 104.54	3
(England) James Wade 102.45	8

Semi-finals (best of 15 legs); 7 July
1	(Scotland) Peter Wright 94.46	3
4	(England) Rob Cross 95.13	8
2	(Scotland) Gary Anderson 100.33	8
(England) James Wade 101.04	7

Final (best of 15 legs); 7 July
4	(England) Rob Cross 97.22	4
2	(Scotland) Gary Anderson 102.56	8
