= 2017 US Darts Masters =

2017 partypoker US Darts Masters

Tournament information
- Dates: 14–15 July 2017
- Venue: Tropicana Las Vegas
- Location: Las Vegas
- Country: United States
- Organisation(s): PDC
- Format: Legs; Final – best of 15 legs
- Prize fund: £60,000
- Winner's share: £20,000
- High checkout: 156 (Scotland) Peter Wright

Champion(s)
- (Netherlands) Michael van Gerwen

The 2017 partypoker US Darts Masters was the inaugural staging of the tournament by the Professional Darts Corporation, as a third entry in the 2017 World Series of Darts. The tournament featured eight North American players who faced eight PDC players, which was held at the Tropicana Las Vegas in Las Vegas, United States from 14–15 July 2017.

Michael van Gerwen became the champion, defeating Daryl Gurney 8–6 in the final to win his first title in Vegas.

== Prize money ==
This is how the prize money is divided:

Position (no. of players)		Prize money (Total: £60,000)
Winner	(1)	£20,000
Runner-up	(1)	£10,000
Semi-finalists	(2)	£5,000
Quarter-finalists	(4)	£2,500
First round	(8)	£1,250

== Qualifiers ==
Adrian Lewis and Phil Taylor were both originally scheduled to take part but both withdrew. Lewis was replaced by Gerwyn Price, whilst Taylor was replaced by World Number six James Wade.

The eight invited PDC players, seeded according to the World Series Order of Merit, were:

1. (Netherlands) Michael van Gerwen (winner)
2. (Scotland) Gary Anderson (semi-finals)
3. (Scotland) Peter Wright (quarter-finals)
4. (England) James Wade (first round)
5. (Netherlands) Raymond van Barneveld (quarter-finals)
6. (Wales) Gerwyn Price (semi-finals)
7. (Northern Ireland) Daryl Gurney (runner-up)
8. (Germany) Max Hopp (first round)

The North American qualifier winners were:

- (United States) Chris White (first round)
- (United States) Willard Bruguier (first round)
- (Canada) Dave Richardson (quarter-finals)
- (Canada) David Cameron (first round)

The top 4 North American Order of Merit qualifiers were:

- (Canada) Jayson Barlow (first round)
- (United States) DJ Sayre (first round)
- (Canada) Shawn Brenneman (first round)
- (Canada) Dawson Murschell (quarter-finals)

== Draw ==
First round (best of 11 legs); 14 July
1	(Netherlands) Michael van Gerwen 104.86	6
(United States) Chris White 91.22	0
(Germany) Max Hopp 89.67	3
(Canada) Dave Richardson 92.01	6
4	(England) James Wade 86.72	5
(Canada) Dawson Murschell 81.27	6
(Wales) Gerwyn Price 85.04	6
(United States) Willard Bruguier 80.07	4
2	(Scotland) Gary Anderson 102.48	6
(Canada) Jayson Barlow 78.72	0
(Netherlands) Raymond van Barneveld 88.80	6
(Canada) David Cameron 85.64	3
3	(Scotland) Peter Wright 86.51	6
(Canada) Shawn Brenneman 85.92	3
(Northern Ireland) Daryl Gurney 98.58	6
(United States) DJ Sayre 83.20	2

Quarter-finals (best of 15 legs); 15 July
1	(Netherlands) Michael van Gerwen 95.70	8
(Canada) Dave Richardson 85.94	1
(Canada) Dawson Murschell 90.56	4
(Wales) Gerwyn Price 92.30	8
2	(Scotland) Gary Anderson 99.32	8
(Netherlands) Raymond van Barneveld 98.84	4
3	(Scotland) Peter Wright 97.28	7
(Northern Ireland) Daryl Gurney 97.81	8

Semi-finals (best of 15 legs); 15 July
1	(Netherlands) Michael van Gerwen 101.04	8
(Wales) Gerwyn Price 88.58	0
2	(Scotland) Gary Anderson 103.81	4
(Northern Ireland) Daryl Gurney 101.89	8

Final (best of 15 legs); 15 July
1	(Netherlands) Michael van Gerwen 101.35	8
(Northern Ireland) Daryl Gurney 96.08	6
