= John Gwynne (commentator) =

British darts commentator (1945–2022)

- Born: Richard John Gwynne; 23 April 1945; High Ercall, Shropshire, England
- Died: 9 July 2022 (aged 77); Manchester, England
- Occupations: Sports commentator, reporter
- Spouse: Margaret
- Children: Andrew Gwynne

Richard John Gwynne (23 April 1945 – 9 July 2022) was an English sports commentator. He was best known for his darts commentary, and worked at Sky Sports for twenty years.

== Early life ==
Gwynne was born in High Ercall, Shropshire in 1945 and moved to Manchester in 1957. He attended Chorlton Grammar School. Upon leaving, he went into teaching, and taught English and was Deputy Housemaster (Fisher) at Moston Brook High School in Manchester.

== Broadcasting career ==
Gwynne was a commentator for the PDC darts tournaments which air on Sky Sports. He commentated on the first ever PDC World Championship in 1994, and the 2016 World Championship was his last tournament for Sky Sports.

Gwynne's first media job was covering speedway at Belle Vue in Manchester for Piccadilly Radio in 1980. He moved onto local north-west football. Premium-rate telephone information services such as ClubCall which gained popularity during the late 1980s and Gwynne worked for a cricket equivalent, "Cricket Call" covering Lancashire County Cricket Club between 1988 and 1991. Alongside darts entrepreneur Dick Allix, they set up a similar darts phoneline service in 1989 called The Darts Line, for which Gwynne provided darts news and tournament updates. Gwynne had commentated on some darts tournaments for regional ITV programmes with Dave Lanning, and when the darts split occurred in 1993, Sky Sports took up coverage of WDC (later to become the PDC) tournaments, choosing Lanning and Gwynne to be the event commentators.

Gwynne was a regular match reporter for over 20 years on Sky's Gillette Soccer Saturday and was the reporter when Manchester City won the league title on the last day of the 2011–12 season. From April 2014, he was also providing expert analysis on William Hill's online betting service and "in-play" Radio service.

In 2014, he was inducted into the PDC Hall of Fame. Later in 2014, Gwynne began commentating on Eurosport for BDO darts tournaments, such as the Six Nations Cup, Winmau World Masters and the BDO World Championship. In the years that followed, he made occasional commentary appearances on Sky Sports during the early rounds of the PDC World Championship and worked on Talksport's radio commentary of the event in 2017/18.

His final ever commentary came in the inaugural World Senior Darts Championships in 2022 when he called the Robert Thornton v Martin Adams Final on February 6. He died 5 months later.

== Other work ==
Gwynne initially worked as a school teacher in Manchester until 1987. He was also an after-dinner speaker and toastmaster. Gwynne was master of ceremonies at arts exhibitions and ran local darts tournaments in the Manchester area. From the start of the 2019 season, he was the announcer for Lancashire County Cricket Club.

In September 2020, in conjunction with David Mitchell and with a foreword by Jeff Stelling, Gwynne published a memoir of his football memories, Soccer Satisfied.

== Personal life and death ==
Gwynne's wife, Margaret, predeceased him. His son is politician Andrew Gwynne.

A lifelong fan of Manchester City F.C., Gwynne died from cancer at his home in Manchester, surrounded by family, on 9 July 2022. He was 77.
