= 2020 PDC Calendar =

2020 calendar of the Professional Darts Corporation

This is a list of the 2020 Professional Darts Corporation calendar of events with player progression documented from the quarterfinals stage where applicable.

The list includes European tour events, Players Championships events, World Series of Darts events and PDC majors. It includes some regional tours, such as the ones in North American, Asian and Oceanic regions, but does not include British Darts Organisation (BDO) or World Darts Federation (WDF) events.

== January ==
Date	Tournament	Champions	Runners-up	Semi-finalists	Quarter-finalists
16–19 January	2020 European Q-School (Germany) Hildesheim	Does not apply.			
16–19 January	2020 UK Q-School (England) Wigan	Does not apply.			
25 January	2020 PDC Challenge Tour 1 (England) Wigan	(England) Robert Collins	(England) Adam Huckvale	(Scotland) Ryan Hogarth (England) Justin Hood	(Northern Ireland) Kyle McKinstry (Netherlands) Maikel Verberk (Netherlands) Danny van Trijp (England) Paul Phillips
25 January	2020 PDC Challenge Tour 2 (England) Wigan	(England) Scott Mitchell	(England) Andrew Gilding	(England) Eddie Lovely (Scotland) Darren Beveridge	(Netherlands) Danny van Klompenburg (Scotland) Cameron Menzies (Sweden) Johan Engström (England) Stu Wilson
26 January	2020 PDC Challenge Tour 3 (England) Wigan	(England) Matthew Dennant	(Northern Ireland) Nathan Rafferty	(Australia) Gordon Mathers (England) James Hubbard	(England) Paul Williams (Scotland) Cameron Menzies (Russia) Boris Koltsov (England) Graham Usher
26 January	2020 PDC Challenge Tour 4 (England) Wigan	(Netherlands) Jitse van der Wal	(Netherlands) Arjan Konterman	(England) Scott Taylor (England) Daniel Ayres	(New Zealand) Cody Harris (Poland) Tytus Kanik (England) James Hubbard (Belgium) Brian Raman
31 January	2020 DPA Tour 1 (Australia) Barrack Heights	(Australia) Gordon Mathers	(Australia) Kyle Anderson	(Australia) Clayton Collins (Australia) Brody Klinge	(Australia) Liam McLennan (Australia) Mick Lacey (Australia) Jamie Rundle (Australia) Lucas Cameron
31 January–2 February	2020 Masters (England) Milton Keynes	(Scotland) Peter Wright	(England) Michael Smith	(England) Nathan Aspinall (Scotland) Gary Anderson	(Wales) Jonny Clayton (England) Adrian Lewis (England) Dave Chisnall (Wales) Gerwyn Price

== February ==
Date	Tournament	Champions	Runners-up	Semi-finalists	Quarter-finalists
1 February	2020 DPA Tour 2 (Australia) Barrack Heights	(Australia) Robbie King	(Australia) Jamie Rundle	(Australia) Liam McLennan (Australia) James Bailey	(Australia) Raymond O'Donnell (New Zealand) Haupai Puha (Australia) Dean Dixon (Australia) Brendon McCausland
2 February	2020 DPA Tour 3 (Australia) Barrack Heights	(Australia) Kyle Anderson	(Australia) Mal Cuming	(Australia) Liam McLennan (New Zealand) Ben Robb	(New Zealand) Haupai Puha (Australia) Tim Pusey (Australia) Robbie King (Australia) Steve Fitzpatrick
6 February	2020 Premier League Darts, Night 1 (Scotland) Aberdeen	Does not apply.			
7 February	2020 European Tour 1 – Eastern Europe Qualifier (Hungary) Budapest	Does not apply.			
8 February	2020 European Tour 2 – Eastern Europe Qualifier (Hungary) Budapest	Does not apply.			
8 February	2020 PDC Players Championship 1 (England) Barnsley	(Scotland) Gary Anderson	(Canada) Jeff Smith	(Northern Ireland) Brendan Dolan (England) Adrian Lewis	(Scotland) Peter Wright (Netherlands) Maik Kuivenhoven (England) Steve Beaton (England) Joe Cullen
8 February	2020 European Tour 3 – Eastern Europe Qualifier (Hungary) Budapest	Does not apply.			
9 February	2020 European Tour 4 – Eastern Europe Qualifier (Hungary) Budapest	Does not apply.			
9 February	2020 PDC Players Championship 2 (England) Barnsley	(England) Nathan Aspinall	(Wales) Gerwyn Price	(Germany) Gabriel Clemens (Netherlands) Dirk van Duijvenbode	(England) Jamie Hughes (Scotland) Peter Wright (England) Ross Smith (Northern Ireland) Mickey Mansell
9 February	2020 European Tour 5 – Eastern Europe Qualifier (Hungary) Budapest	Does not apply.			
13 February	2020 Premier League Darts, Night 2 (England) Nottingham	Does not apply.			
14 February	2020 European Tour 1 – Tour Card Qualifier (England) Wigan	Does not apply.			
14 February	2020 European Tour 2 – Tour Card Qualifier (England) Wigan	Does not apply.			
15 February	2020 PDC Players Championship 3 (England) Wigan	(England) Ryan Searle	(Netherlands) Michael van Gerwen	(Scotland) Peter Wright (Netherlands) Jeffrey de Zwaan	(England) Chris Dobey (England) Joe Cullen (Netherlands) Danny Noppert (England) Glen Durrant
16 February	2020 PDC Players Championship 4 (England) Wigan	(Poland) Krzysztof Ratajski	(England) Ian White	(Scotland) Peter Wright (Netherlands) Danny Noppert	(Netherlands) Michael van Gerwen (Germany) Gabriel Clemens (Austria) Mensur Suljović (Netherlands) Maik Kuivenhoven
20 February	2020 Premier League Darts, Night 3 (Wales) Cardiff	Does not apply.			
22 February	2020 EADC Tour 1 Moscow, Russia	(Russia) Boris Koltsov	(Russia) Aleksei Kadochnikov	(Belarus) Andrey Pontus (Russia) Aleksander Shevel	(Russia) Dmitry Zhavoronkov (Russia) Maxim Aldoshin (Russia) Dmitry Lushankov (Russia) Maxim Belov
22 February	2020 EADC Tour 2 Moscow, Russia	(Russia) Aleksei Kadochnikov	(Russia) Boris Koltsov	(Belarus) Andrey Pontus (Russia) Roman Obhukov	(Russia) Evgenii Izotov (Russia) Artem Klyuev (Russia) Burykin Vadim (Russia) Vitaliy Hohryakov
22 February	2020 PDC Players Championship 5 (England) Wigan	(Scotland) Peter Wright	(Wales) Gerwyn Price	(South Africa) Devon Petersen (Republic of Ireland) Steve Lennon	(England) Rob Cross (England) Glen Durrant (Germany) Gabriel Clemens (Republic of Ireland) William O'Connor
23 February	2020 EADC Tour 3 Moscow, Russia	(Russia) Boris Koltsov	(Russia) Evgenii Izotov	(Belarus) Andrey Pontus (Russia) Roman Obhukov	(Russia) Sergei Smirnov (Russia) Maxim Aldoshin (Russia) Vitaliy Hohryakov (Russia) Maxim Belov
23 February	2020 PDC Players Championship 6 (England) Wigan	(Wales) Gerwyn Price	(Netherlands) Michael van Gerwen	(Poland) Krzysztof Ratajski (England) Stephen Bunting	(England) James Wade (Scotland) Peter Wright (England) Ian White (England) Steve Beaton
27 February	2020 European Tour 4 – Nordic & Baltic Qualifier (Finland) Vääksy	Does not apply.			
27 February	2020 European Tour 1 – Host Nation Qualifier (Belgium) Hasselt	Does not apply.			
27 February	2020 European Tour 1 – Associate Member Qualifier (Belgium) Hasselt	Does not apply.			
27 February	2020 Premier League Darts, Night 4 (Republic of Ireland) Dublin	Does not apply.			
28 February	2020 European Tour 5 – Nordic & Baltic Qualifier (Finland) Vääksy	Does not apply.			
28 February–1 March	2020 Belgian Darts Championship (Belgium) Hasselt	(Wales) Gerwyn Price	(England) Michael Smith	(Scotland) Peter Wright (Netherlands) Dirk van Duijvenbode	(England) Mervyn King (Poland) Krzysztof Ratajski (England) Nathan Aspinall (Austria) Mensur Suljović
28 February	2020 European Tour 6 – Nordic & Baltic Qualifier (Finland) Vääksy	Does not apply.			
29 February	2020 PDC Nordic & Baltic Tour 1 (Finland) Vääksy	(Finland) Kim Viljanen	(Lithuania) Darius Labanauskas	(Sweden) Johan Engström (Finland) Marko Kantele	(Latvia) Madars Razma (Finland) Pasi Hyttinen (Finland) Raino Hasu (Sweden) Daniel Larsson
29 February	2020 PDC Development Tour 1 (Germany) Hildesheim	(Netherlands) Berry van Peer	(Germany) Martin Schindler	(England) Ted Evetts (England) Dom Taylor	(Netherlands) Damian Mol (Belgium) Brian Raman (Germany) Nico Kurz (Netherlands) Kevin Doets
29 February	2020 European Tour 7 – Nordic & Baltic Qualifier (Finland) Vääksy	Does not apply.			
29 February	2020 PDC Development Tour 2 (Germany) Hildesheim	(England) Ryan Meikle	(Netherlands) Niels Zonneveld	(Belgium) Brian Raman (England) Dom Taylor	(Wales) Lewy Williams (England) Keelan Kay (England) Bradley Brooks (Austria) Rusty-Jake Rodriguez

== March ==
Date	Tournament	Champions	Runners-up	Semi-finalists	Quarter-finalists
1 March	2020 PDC Development Tour 3 (Germany) Hildesheim	(England) Ryan Meikle	(Germany) Nico Kurz	(Netherlands) Jamai van den Herik (Poland) Sebastian Białecki	(England) Bradley Brooks (England) Joshua Richardson (Netherlands) Justin van Tergouw (Netherlands) Niels Zonneveld
1 March	2020 PDC Development Tour 4 (Germany) Hildesheim	(Netherlands) Wessel Nijman	(Germany) Martin Schindler	(England) Dom Taylor (Austria) Rusty-Jake Rodriguez	(Germany) Kevin Troppmann (England) Joe Davis (England) Jaikob Selby-Rivas (Netherlands) Bertus Herks
1 March	2020 PDC Nordic & Baltic Tour 2 (Finland) Vääksy	(Sweden) Daniel Larsson	(Finland) Kim Viljanen	(Sweden) Ricky Nauman (Lithuania) Darius Labanauskas	(Sweden) Oskar Lukasiak (Finland) Ville Petäjämäki (Finland) Asko Niskala (Finland) Marko Kantele
5 March	2020 Premier League Darts, Night 5 (England) Exeter	Does not apply.			
6 March	2020 DPA Tour 4 (Australia) Brisbane	(Australia) Mal Cuming	(Australia) Jamie Rundle	(Australia) Gordon Mathers (Australia) James Bailey	(Australia) Mick Lean (Australia) Rhys Mathewson (Australia) Raymond Smith (Australia) Brody Klinge
6–8 March	2020 UK Open (England) Minehead	(Netherlands) Michael van Gerwen	(Wales) Gerwyn Price	(Wales) Jonny Clayton (Northern Ireland) Daryl Gurney	(Belgium) Dimitri Van den Bergh (England) Rob Cross (Netherlands) Jelle Klaasen (England) Jamie Hughes
7 March	2020 DPA Tour 5 (Australia) Brisbane	(New Zealand) Ben Robb	(New Zealand) Haupai Puha	(Australia) Brandon Weening (Australia) Brody Klinge	(Australia) Jamie Rundle (Australia) Tim Pusey (Australia) Steve Fitzpatrick (Australia) Rhys Mathewson
8 March	2020 DPA Tour 6 (Australia) Brisbane	(Australia) Steve Fitzpatrick	(Australia) Gordon Mathers	(Australia) Brendon McCausland (Australia) James Bailey	(Australia) Glen Jones (Australia) Tim Pusey (Australia) Mal Cuming (Australia) Mick Lacey
12 March	2020 Premier League Darts, Night 6 (England) Liverpool	Does not apply.			
13 March	2020 European Tour 3 – Tour Card Qualifier (England) Wigan	Does not apply.			
13 March	2020 European Tour 4 – Tour Card Qualifier (England) Wigan	Does not apply.			
14 March	2020 PDC Players Championship 7 (England) Wigan	(England) Nathan Aspinall	(Northern Ireland) Brendan Dolan	(Netherlands) Danny Noppert (England) James Wade	(Netherlands) Michael van Gerwen (Poland) Krzysztof Ratajski (England) Ian White (Netherlands) Derk Telnekes
15 March	2020 PDC Players Championship 8 (England) Barnsley	(England) Ian White	(England) James Wade	(Netherlands) Derk Telnekes (Belgium) Kim Huybrechts	(England) Luke Woodhouse (England) Keegan Brown (England) Dave Chisnall (England) Michael Smith

== June ==
Date	Tournament	Champion	Runner-up	Third	Fourth
26 May– 5 June	PDC Home Tour (England)	(England) Nathan Aspinall	(Scotland) Gary Anderson	(Wales) Jonny Clayton	(Netherlands) Jelle Klaasen

== July ==
Date	Tournament	Champions	Runners-up	Semi-finalists	Quarter-finalists
8 July	2020 PDC Players Championship 9 (England) Milton Keynes	(Netherlands) Michael van Gerwen	(Scotland) Peter Wright	(Germany) Gabriel Clemens (Poland) Krzysztof Ratajski	(Netherlands) Danny Noppert (Austria) Mensur Suljović (England) Glen Durrant (England) Dave Chisnall
9 July	2020 PDC Players Championship 10 (England) Milton Keynes	(England) Ryan Joyce	(England) Dave Chisnall	(Scotland) Gary Anderson (England) Nathan Aspinall	(England) Glen Durrant (Wales) Jonny Clayton (Scotland) Peter Wright (Netherlands) Martijn Kleermaker
10 July	2020 PDC Players Championship 11 (England) Milton Keynes	(Netherlands) Michael van Gerwen	(Portugal) José de Sousa	(Northern Ireland) Daryl Gurney (Canada) Jeff Smith	(England) Stephen Bunting (England) Ian White (Scotland) Peter Wright (England) Chris Dobey
11 July	2020 PDC Players Championship 12 (England) Milton Keynes	(England) James Wade	(England) Rob Cross	(Austria) Mensur Suljović (England) Ian White	(England) Jamie Hughes (Northern Ireland) Daryl Gurney (England) Michael Smith (Poland) Krzysztof Ratajski
12 July	2020 PDC Players Championship 13 (England) Milton Keynes	(Scotland) Peter Wright	(Wales) Gerwyn Price	(South Africa) Devon Petersen (England) Wayne Jones	(England) James Wade (Scotland) John Henderson (England) Nathan Aspinall (England) Scott Baker
18–26 July	2020 World Matchplay (England) Milton Keynes	(Belgium) Dimitri Van den Bergh	(Scotland) Gary Anderson	(England) Michael Smith (England) Glen Durrant	(Australia) Simon Whitlock (Poland) Krzysztof Ratajski (Netherlands) Vincent van der Voort (England) Adrian Lewis

== August ==
Date	Tournament	Champions	Runners-up	Semi-finalists	Quarter-finalists
25 August	2020 Premier League Darts, Night 7 (England) Milton Keynes	Does not apply.			
26 August	2020 Premier League Darts, Night 8 (England) Milton Keynes	Does not apply.			
27 August	2020 Premier League Darts, Night 9 (England) Milton Keynes	Does not apply.			
28 August	2020 Premier League Darts, Night 10 (England) Milton Keynes	Does not apply.			
29 August	2020 Premier League Darts, Night 11 (England) Milton Keynes	Does not apply.			
30 August	2020 Premier League Darts, Night 12 (England) Milton Keynes	Does not apply.			

== September ==
Date	Tournament	Champions	Runners-up	Semi-finalists	Quarter-finalists
2 September	2020 Premier League Darts, Night 13 (England) Milton Keynes	Does not apply.			
3 September	2020 Premier League Darts, Night 14 (England) Milton Keynes	Does not apply.			
4 September	2020 Premier League Darts, Night 15 (England) Milton Keynes	Does not apply.			
5 September	2020 Premier League Darts, Night 16 (England) Milton Keynes	Does not apply.			
11 September	2020 World Series Finals – Tour Card Holder Qualifier (Germany) Niedernhausen	Does not apply.			
12 September	2020 PDC Players Championship 14 (Germany) Niedernhausen	(Scotland) Peter Wright	(Latvia) Madars Razma	(South Africa) Devon Petersen (Netherlands) Michael van Gerwen	(Spain) Jesús Noguera (Netherlands) Jelle Klaasen (England) Glen Durrant (Poland) Krzysztof Ratajski
13 September	2020 PDC Players Championship 15 (Germany) Niedernhausen	(Australia) Damon Heta	(England) Joe Cullen	(England) Nathan Aspinall (England) Stephen Bunting	(Wales) Gerwyn Price (England) Ian White (Australia) Simon Whitlock (Germany) Martin Schindler
14 September	2020 PDC Players Championship 16 (Germany) Niedernhausen	(Netherlands) Michael van Gerwen	(Austria) Mensur Suljović	(England) Ian White (Wales) Nick Kenny	(England) Luke Humphries (Netherlands) Danny Noppert (England) Ross Smith (Australia) Damon Heta
15 September	2020 PDC Players Championship 17 (Germany) Niedernhausen	(Wales) Gerwyn Price	(South Africa) Devon Petersen	(England) Joe Cullen (England) Ryan Searle	(Netherlands) Derk Telnekes (England) Nathan Aspinall (Austria) Mensur Suljović (England) Ross Smith
16 September	2020 PDC Players Championship 18 (Germany) Niedernhausen	(Wales) Gerwyn Price	(Poland) Krzysztof Ratajski	(Portugal) José de Sousa (Northern Ireland) Brendan Dolan	(England) James Wade (Netherlands) Michael van Gerwen (England) Matt Clark (Australia) Simon Whitlock
18–20 September	2020 World Series of Darts Finals (Austria) Salzburg	(Wales) Gerwyn Price	(England) Rob Cross	(England) James Wade (Scotland) Peter Wright	(England) Glen Durrant (England) Michael Smith (Northern Ireland) Daryl Gurney (England) Nathan Aspinall
24 September	2020 European Tour 2 – Host Nation Qualifier; Hildesheim, Germany	Does not apply.			
24 September	2020 European Tour 2 – Associate Member Qualifier; Hildesheim, Germany	Does not apply.			
25 September	2020 PDC Development Tour 5 (England) Barnsley	(Netherlands) Kevin Doets	(Republic of Ireland) Keane Barry	(Czech Republic) Adam Gawlas (Wales) Rhys Griffin	(Netherlands) Owen Roelofs (England) Lewis Pride (Netherlands) Henk Snijder (England) Jarred Cole
25 September	2020 PDC Development Tour 6 (England) Barnsley	(Netherlands) Damian Mol	(England) Keelan Kay	(England) Ryan Meikle (Poland) Sebastian Białecki	(England) Ted Evetts (England) Lewis Gurney (Italy) Marcus Brambati (Wales) Lewy Williams
25–27 September	2020 German Darts Championship (Germany) Hildesheim	(South Africa) Devon Petersen	(Wales) Jonny Clayton	(England) Mervyn King (Netherlands) Danny Noppert	(England) James Wade (England) Dave Chisnall (Northern Ireland) Daryl Gurney (Poland) Krzysztof Ratajski
26 September	2020 PDC Development Tour 7 (England) Barnsley	(England) Ted Evetts	(England) Joe Davis	(Netherlands) Berry van Peer (Netherlands) Damian Mol	(Hong Kong) Lok Yin Lee (Netherlands) Owen Roelofs (Northern Ireland) Nathan Rafferty (Wales) Justin Smith
26 September	2020 PDC Development Tour 8 (England) Barnsley	(Republic of Ireland) Keane Barry	(England) Ryan Meikle	(Netherlands) Berry van Peer (Wales) Rhys Griffin	(Netherlands) Niels Zonneveld (England) Jarred Cole (England) Callan Rydz (Germany) Ole Holtkamp
27 September	2020 PDC Development Tour 9 (England) Barnsley	(Republic of Ireland) Keane Barry	(England) Ryan Meikle	(Netherlands) Berry van Peer (Netherlands) Damian Mol	(Wales) Mikey Rees (Netherlands) Geert Nentjes (England) Lewis Pride (England) Harry Ward
27 September	2020 PDC Development Tour 10 (England) Barnsley	(England) Callan Rydz	(Hong Kong) Lok Yin Lee	(Netherlands) Owen Roelofs (Netherlands) Berry van Peer	(Republic of Ireland) Keane Barry (England) Thomas Lovely (Netherlands) Danny van Trijp (England) Joe Davis

== October ==
Date	Tournament	Champions	Runners-up	Semi-finalists	Quarter-finalists
6–12 October	2020 World Grand Prix (England) Coventry	(Wales) Gerwyn Price	(Netherlands) Dirk van Duijvenbode	(Australia) Simon Whitlock (England) Dave Chisnall	(Netherlands) Michael van Gerwen (Scotland) Gary Anderson (England) Joe Cullen (Netherlands) Jeffrey de Zwaan
9 October	2020 PDC Challenge Tour 5 (England) Barnsley	(Republic of Ireland) Keane Barry	(Netherlands) Maikel Verberk	(England) Matthew Dennant (England) Nick Fullwell	(England) Fallon Sherrock (England) Chris Quantock (England) Kevin Painter (England) Brett Claydon
9 October	2020 PDC Challenge Tour 6 (England) Barnsley	(England) David Evans	(Wales) Richie Burnett	(Scotland) Darren Beveridge (Wales) Kevin Lane	(England) Andrew Gilding (England) Colin Osborne (England) Scott Marsh (Netherlands) Maikel Verberk
10 October	2020 PDC Challenge Tour 7 (England) Barnsley	(Wales) Jim Williams	(Wales) Lewy Williams	(England) Mark Walsh (England) Scott Mitchell	(England) Chris Quantock (Scotland) Jamie Clark (England) Lewis Pride (England) Tony Newell
10 October	2020 PDC Challenge Tour 8 (England) Barnsley	(England) David Evans	(England) Chas Barstow	(England) Christopher Bent (Northern Ireland) Nathan Rafferty	(Republic of Ireland) Keane Barry (England) Matthew Dennant (England) Adrian Devine (Austria) Rusty-Jake Rodriguez
11 October	2020 PDC Challenge Tour 9 (England) Barnsley	(England) Ritchie Edhouse	(England) Scott Taylor	(England) Jarred Cole (Republic of Ireland) Keane Barry	(England) Stephen Gallimore (Netherlands) Maikel Verberk (Netherlands) Owen Roelofs (England) Ryan Harrington
11 October	2020 PDC Challenge Tour 10 (England) Barnsley	(Netherlands) Kevin Doets	(England) Ritchie Edhouse	(England) Dave Parletti (England) James Richardson	(England) Thomas Lovely (England) Chris Quantock (Scotland) Darren Beveridge (Austria) Rusty-Jake Rodriguez
15 October	2020 Premier League Play-Offs (England) Coventry	(England) Glen Durrant	(England) Nathan Aspinall	(Scotland) Gary Anderson (Scotland) Peter Wright	Does not apply.
15 October	2020 European Tour 3 – Host Nation Qualifier (Germany) Sindelfingen	Does not apply.			
15 October	2020 European Tour 3 – Associate Member Qualifier (Germany) Sindelfingen	Does not apply.			
15 October	2020 European Tour 4 – Associate Member Qualifier (Germany) Sindelfingen	Does not apply.			
16–18 October	2020 European Darts Grand Prix (Germany) Sindelfingen	(Portugal) José de Sousa	(Netherlands) Michael van Gerwen	(Austria) Mensur Suljović (England) Ian White	(England) Nathan Aspinall (England) Rob Cross (Lithuania) Darius Labanauskas (Netherlands) Maik Kuivenhoven
17 October	2020 PDC Women's Series 1 (England) Barnsley	(England) Lisa Ashton	(England) Fallon Sherrock	(England) Jo Locke (England) Deta Hedman	(England) Louise Pearson (England) Beau Greaves (Australia) Corrine Hammond (England) Felicia Blay
17 October	2020 PDC Women's Series 2 (England) Barnsley	(England) Deta Hedman	(Netherlands) Aileen de Graaf	(England) Lorraine Winstanley (England) Fallon Sherrock	(Wales) Tracey Davies (Wales) Annmarie Potts (Sweden) Vicky Pruim (England) Donna Gleed
18 October	2020 PDC Women's Series 3 (England) Barnsley	(England) Lisa Ashton	(England) Deta Hedman	(England) Tracy North (Australia) Corrine Hammond	(England) Fallon Sherrock (Netherlands) Aileen de Graaf (England) Jo Clements (Sweden) Vicky Pruim
18 October	2020 PDC Women's Series 4 (England) Barnsley	(England) Fallon Sherrock	(Australia) Corrine Hammond	(England) Lisa Ashton (England) Laura Turner	(England) Deta Hedman (England) Eleanor Cairns (England) Lorraine Winstanley (England) Maria O'Brien
22 October	2020 European Tour 4 – Host Nation Qualifier (Germany) Riesa	Does not apply.			
23–25 October	2020 International Darts Open (Germany) Riesa	(England) Joe Cullen	(Netherlands) Michael van Gerwen	(Austria) Mensur Suljović (England) Michael Smith	(England) James Wade (Poland) Krzysztof Ratajski (England) Ross Smith (Netherlands) Danny Noppert
29 October–1 November	2020 European Championship (Germany) Oberhausen	(Scotland) Peter Wright	(England) James Wade	(South Africa) Devon Petersen (Wales) Jonny Clayton	(Republic of Ireland) William O'Connor (England) Ian White (England) Steve West (Netherlands) Dirk van Duijvenbode

== November ==
Date	Tournament	Champions	Runners-up	Semi-finalists	Quarter-finalists
6–8 November	2020 PDC World Cup of Darts (Austria) Salzburg	(Wales) Price/Clayton	(England) M. Smith/Cross	(Belgium) Van den Bergh/Huybrechts (Germany) Clemens/Hopp	(Austria) Suljović/Rodriguez (Canada) J. Smith/Campbell (Australia) Whitlock/Heta (Netherlands) van Gerwen/Noppert
9 November	2020 Grand Slam of Darts – Tour Card Holder Qualifier (England) Coventry	Does not apply.			
10 November	2020 PDC Players Championship 19 (England) Coventry	(England) Michael Smith	(Netherlands) Jermaine Wattimena	(Northern Ireland) Brendan Dolan (Portugal) José de Sousa	(Netherlands) Vincent van der Voort (Australia) Damon Heta (Scotland) Peter Wright (England) Conan Whitehead
11 November	2020 PDC Players Championship 20 (England) Coventry	(England) Michael Smith	(Portugal) José de Sousa	(Netherlands) Vincent van der Voort (England) Joe Cullen	(Germany) Gabriel Clemens (Lithuania) Darius Labanauskas (Northern Ireland) Brendan Dolan (Netherlands) Jeffrey de Zwaan
12 November	2020 PDC Players Championship 21 (England) Coventry	(Wales) Gerwyn Price	(Australia) Damon Heta	(Republic of Ireland) William O'Connor (England) Callan Rydz	(England) Stephen Bunting (England) Ryan Searle (England) Ian White (Poland) Krzysztof Kciuk
13 November	2020 PDC Players Championship 22 (England) Coventry	(Scotland) Peter Wright	(Portugal) José de Sousa	(England) Adrian Lewis (England) Joe Cullen	(Scotland) Ryan Murray (Wales) Jonny Clayton (Netherlands) Jermaine Wattimena (Australia) Damon Heta
14 November	2020 PDC Players Championship 23 (England) Coventry	(England) Joe Cullen	(Poland) Krzysztof Ratajski	(Belgium) Kim Huybrechts (England) Andy Boulton	(England) Adrian Lewis (England) Ryan Joyce (Scotland) Peter Wright (Northern Ireland) Daryl Gurney
16–24 November	2020 Grand Slam of Darts (England) Coventry	(Portugal) José de Sousa	(England) James Wade	(Australia) Simon Whitlock (Belgium) Dimitri Van den Bergh	(Netherlands) Michael van Gerwen (England) Michael Smith (Australia) Damon Heta (England) Nathan Aspinall
27–29 November	2020 Players Championship Finals (England) Coventry	(Netherlands) Michael van Gerwen	(England) Mervyn King	(Scotland) Peter Wright (Wales) Gerwyn Price	(England) Michael Smith (Australia) Damon Heta (England) Joe Cullen (Netherlands) Dirk van Duijvenbode
30 November	2021 PDC World Darts Championship – Tour Card Holder Qualifier (England) Coventry	Does not apply.			

== December ==
Date	Tournament	Champions	Runners-up	Semi-finalists	Quarter-finalists
15 December–3 January	2021 PDC World Darts Championship (England) London	(Wales) Gerwyn Price	(Scotland) Gary Anderson	(England) Dave Chisnall (England) Stephen Bunting	(Netherlands) Michael van Gerwen (Netherlands) Dirk van Duijvenbode (Poland) Krzysztof Ratajski (Northern Ireland) Daryl Gurney

== See also ==
- List of players with a 2020 PDC Tour Card
- 2020 PDC Pro Tour
