= Chris White (darts player) =

American darts player

Personal information
- Nickname: "The Great White Shark"
- Born: November 28, 1971 (age 54) Bowmanville, Ontario, Canada
- Home town: Clayton, California, U.S.

Sport
- Sport: Darts
- Playing since: 1991
- Darts: 20g Shot Darts Signature
- Laterality: Right-handed
- Walk-on music: "The Pretender" by Foo Fighters

Organisation (see split in darts)
- BDO: 2001–2002
- PDC: 2004–2022

WDF major events – best performances
- World Masters: Last 128: 2002

PDC premier events – best performances
- Desert Classic: Last 32: 2009

Other tournament wins
- Years
ADO Buckeye Open	2016
ADO Music City Classic	2018
ADO Feather Falls Casino July Classic	2013
ADO Gold Coast Shootout	2015
ADO Oregon Open	2014
ADO Queen Mary Classic	2011, 2012, 2015
ADO San Diego Memorial	2015
ADO Sands Regency Open	2014
ADO Tahoe-Biltmore Open	2018
ADO Wild West Shootout	2015
ADO Yuba City Summer Classic	2016
ADO Yuba-Sutter Summer Classic	2014
Camellia Classic	2006, 2013, 2016, 2018
Las Vegas Open	2007
MLD Battle of the Bay	2010
North American Pro Tour Sacramento	2013

Chris White (born November 28, 1971) is an American former professional darts player who has played in Professional Darts Corporation (PDC) tournaments.

== Career ==
White made his debut on the 2009 Las Vegas Desert Classic, losing to Andy Hamilton 6–1. He then appeared at the 2017 US Darts Masters losing 6–0 to Michael van Gerwen.

White quit the PDC in December 2022.
