= List of players with a 2021 PDC Tour Card =

A 2021 Tour Card is needed to compete in Professional Darts Corporation ProTour tournaments.

In total 128 players are granted Tour Cards, which enables them to participate in all Players Championships and European Tour Qualifiers.

Most Tour Cards are valid for 2 years. The top 64 in the PDC Order of Merit all receive Tour Cards automatically, and those who won a two-year card in 2020 still had a valid card for 2021. The top 2 of the 2019 Challenge Tour and Development Tour also won cards. The remaining places will be awarded at the 2021 Q-Schools, with the final four days of competition awarding one Tour Card per day from the UK Q-School and the European Q-School; with the remaining players being ranked and the top players also receiving Tour Cards. All players who won a card at either Q-School had their Order of Merit ranking reset to zero.

Harry Ward and Kyle Anderson resigned their cards after the 2021 PDC World Darts Championship, which allowed Mark McGeeney and Maik Kuivenhoven to move into the top 64 and retain their Tour Cards.

Andy Boulton also switched his allegiance from England to Scotland on residency grounds.

| No. | Country | Player | Prize money | Qualified through |
|---|---|---|---|---|
| 1 | Wales | Gerwyn Price | £1,317,500 | Top 64 of Order of Merit |
| 2 | Netherlands | Michael van Gerwen | £1,044,750 | Top 64 of Order of Merit |
| 3 | Scotland | Peter Wright | £1,021,500 | Top 64 of Order of Merit |
| 4 | England | Rob Cross | £516,000 | Top 64 of Order of Merit |
| 5 | England | Nathan Aspinall | £457,750 | Top 64 of Order of Merit |
| 6 | England | Dave Chisnall | £440,750 | Top 64 of Order of Merit |
| 7 | England | James Wade | £432,500 | Top 64 of Order of Merit |
| 8 | Scotland | Gary Anderson | £421,250 | Top 64 of Order of Merit |
| 9 | England | Michael Smith | £416,750 | Top 64 of Order of Merit |
| 10 | Belgium | Dimitri Van den Bergh | £387,750 | Top 64 of Order of Merit |
| 11 | Northern Ireland | Daryl Gurney | £358,500 | Top 64 of Order of Merit |
| 12 | England | Ian White | £385,500 | Top 64 of Order of Merit |
| 13 | England | Glen Durrant | £357,750 | Top 64 of Order of Merit |
| 14 | Poland | Krzysztof Ratajski | £324,500 | Top 64 of Order of Merit |
| 15 | Portugal | José de Sousa | £314,250 | Top 64 of Order of Merit |
| 16 | England | Joe Cullen | £291,500 | Top 64 of Order of Merit |
| 17 | England | Stephen Bunting | £277,500 | Top 64 of Order of Merit |
| 18 | Wales | Jonny Clayton | £263,000 | Top 64 of Order of Merit |
| 19 | Australia | Simon Whitlock | £262,000 | Top 64 of Order of Merit |
| 20 | England | Mervyn King | £258,250 | Top 64 of Order of Merit |
| 21 | Austria | Mensur Suljović | £257,250 | Top 64 of Order of Merit |
| 22 | Netherlands | Jeffrey de Zwaan | £211,000 | Top 64 of Order of Merit |
| 23 | England | Chris Dobey | £209,000 | Top 64 of Order of Merit |
| 24 | England | Adrian Lewis | £208,750 | Top 64 of Order of Merit |
| 25 | Netherlands | Danny Noppert | £207,250 | Top 64 of Order of Merit |
| 26 | Netherlands | Jermaine Wattimena | £205,000 | Top 64 of Order of Merit |
| 27 | England | Jamie Hughes | £188,750 | Top 64 of Order of Merit |
| 28 | Netherlands | Vincent van der Voort | £188,000 | Top 64 of Order of Merit |
| 29 | Germany | Gabriel Clemens | £185,000 | Top 64 of Order of Merit |
| 30 | England | Ricky Evans | £181,000 | Top 64 of Order of Merit |
| 31 | South Africa | Devon Petersen | £170,750 | Top 64 of Order of Merit |
| 32 | Netherlands | Dirk van Duijvenbode | £168,000 | Top 64 of Order of Merit |
| 33 | England | Steve Beaton | £153,250 | Top 64 of Order of Merit |
| 34 | Northern Ireland | Brendan Dolan | £143,250 | Top 64 of Order of Merit |
| 35 | England | Keegan Brown | £142,250 | Top 64 of Order of Merit |
| 36 | Ireland | William O'Connor | £139,000 | Top 64 of Order of Merit |
| 37 | England | Ryan Searle | £134,000 | Top 64 of Order of Merit |
| 38 | Belgium | Kim Huybrechts | £133,750 | Top 64 of Order of Merit |
| 39 | Germany | Max Hopp | £123,750 | Top 64 of Order of Merit |
| 40 | Scotland | John Henderson | £123,500 | Top 64 of Order of Merit |
| 41 | England | Ross Smith | £121,000 | Top 64 of Order of Merit |
| 42 | England | Luke Humphries | £117,500 | Top 64 of Order of Merit |
| 43 | Lithuania | Darius Labanauskas | £116,250 | Top 64 of Order of Merit |
| 44 | England | Ryan Joyce | £103,750 | Top 64 of Order of Merit |
| 45 | England | Steve West | £99,250 | Top 64 of Order of Merit |
| 46 | England | Darren Webster | £96,000 | Top 64 of Order of Merit |
| 47 | Ireland | Steve Lennon | £85,000 | Top 64 of Order of Merit |
| 48 | England | Luke Woodhouse | £84,000 | Top 64 of Order of Merit |
| 49 | England | Justin Pipe | £80,250 | Top 64 of Order of Merit |
| 50 | Netherlands | Ron Meulenkamp | £79,000 | Top 64 of Order of Merit |
| 51 | Scotland | Andy Boulton | £72,750 | Top 64 of Order of Merit |
| 52 | Australia | Damon Heta | £72,750 | Top 64 of Order of Merit |
| 53 | Latvia | Madars Razma | £68,500 | Top 64 of Order of Merit |
| 54 | Northern Ireland | Mickey Mansell | £65,000 | Top 64 of Order of Merit |
| 55 | England | Josh Payne | £63,000 | Top 64 of Order of Merit |
| 56 | Netherlands | Jelle Klaasen | £61,000 | Top 64 of Order of Merit |
| 57 | England | Matthew Edgar | £54,750 | Top 64 of Order of Merit |
| 58 | England | Adam Hunt | £51,500 | Top 64 of Order of Merit |
| 59 | Spain | Cristo Reyes | £49,000 | Top 64 of Order of Merit |
| 60 | England | Ted Evetts | £48,500 | Top 64 of Order of Merit |
| 61 | England | Jason Lowe | £48,000 | Top 64 of Order of Merit |
| 62 | England | James Wilson | £44,750 | Top 64 of Order of Merit |
| 63 | England | Mark McGeeney | £44,000 | Top 64 of Order of Merit |
| 64 | Netherlands | Maik Kuivenhoven | £41,000 | Top 64 of Order of Merit |
| 65 | England | Callan Rydz | £38,000 | 2019 Challenge Tour |
| 66 | Netherlands | Martijn Kleermaker | £33,250 | 2020 Q-School |
| 67 | England | Scott Waites | £33,000 | 2020 Q-School |
| 68 | Scotland | Ryan Murray | £32,750 | 2020 Q-School |
| 69 | Canada | Jeff Smith | £32,500 | 2020 Q-School |
| 70 | England | Wayne Jones | £30,500 | 2020 Q-School |
| 71 | Czech Republic | Karel Sedláček | £28,000 | 2020 Q-School |
| 72 | Netherlands | Derk Telnekes | £25,500 | 2020 Q-School |
| 73 | England | Andy Hamilton | £24,000 | 2020 Q-School |
| 74 | Wales | Nick Kenny | £23,000 | 2020 Q-School |
| 75 | Belgium | Mike De Decker | £23,000 | 2020 Q-School |
| 76 | Croatia | Boris Krčmar | £20,000 | 2020 Q-School |
| 77 | England | Ryan Meikle | £19,000 | 2019 Development Tour |
| 78 | England | Lisa Ashton | £18,500 | 2020 Q-School |
| 79 | England | Bradley Brooks | £15,500 | 2020 Q-School |
| 80 | Scotland | William Borland | £14,500 | 2020 Q-School |
| 81 | Sweden | Daniel Larsson | £12,000 | 2020 Q-School |
| 82 | Ireland | Ciarán Teehan | £12,000 | 2019 Development Tour |
| 83 | Hong Kong | Kai Fan Leung | £11,000 | 2020 Q-School |
| 84 | England | Alan Tabern | £11,000 | 2020 Q-School |
| 85 | Spain | Jesús Noguera | £9,750 | 2019 Challenge Tour |
| 86 | England | Steve Brown | £8,000 | 2020 Q-School |
| 87 | Poland | Krzysztof Kciuk | £7,250 | 2020 Q-School |
| 88 | England | Martin Atkins | £7,000 | 2020 Q-School |
| 89 | England | Peter Jacques | £6,500 | 2020 Q-School |
| 90 | England | Gary Blades | £5,000 | 2020 Q-School |
| 91 | Germany | Steffen Siepmann | £4,000 | 2020 Q-School |
| 92 | England | Darren Penhall | £4,000 | 2020 Q-School |
| 93 | Netherlands | Wesley Harms | £4,000 | 2020 Q-School |
| 94 | Austria | Harald Leitinger | £3,500 | 2020 Q-School |
| 95 | England | Aaron Beeney | £2,000 | 2020 Q-School |
| 96 | England | David Evans | £0 | 2020 Challenge Tour |
| 97 | England | Ritchie Edhouse | £0 | 2020 Challenge Tour |
| 98 | Ireland | Keane Barry | £0 | 2020 Development Tour |
| 99 | Netherlands | Berry van Peer | £0 | 2020 Development Tour |
| 100 | Belgium | Geert De Vos | £0 | 2021 Q-School |
| 101 | England | Kirk Shepherd | £0 | 2021 Q-School |
| 102 | Netherlands | Geert Nentjes | £0 | 2021 Q-School |
| 103 | England | Jason Heaver | £0 | 2021 Q-School |
| 104 | Germany | Florian Hempel | £0 | 2021 Q-School |
| 105 | England | Jake Jones | £0 | 2021 Q-School |
| 106 | Russia | Boris Koltsov | £0 | 2021 Q-School |
| 107 | England | Scott Mitchell | £0 | 2021 Q-School |
| 108 | Netherlands | Niels Zonneveld | £0 | 2021 Q-School |
| 109 | Germany | Martin Schindler | £0 | 2021 Q-School |
| 110 | Netherlands | Raymond van Barneveld | £0 | 2021 Q-School |
| 111 | Austria | Zoran Lerchbacher | £0 | 2021 Q-School |
| 112 | Czech Republic | Adam Gawlas | £0 | 2021 Q-School |
| 113 | Germany | Michael Unterbuchner | £0 | 2021 Q-School |
| 114 | Greece | John Michael | £0 | 2021 Q-School |
| 115 | Germany | Robert Marijanović | £0 | 2021 Q-School |
| 116 | England | Jack Main | £0 | 2021 Q-School |
| 117 | England | Andrew Gilding | £0 | 2021 Q-School |
| 118 | England | Martin Lukeman | £0 | 2021 Q-School |
| 119 | Wales | Lewy Williams | £0 | 2021 Q-School |
| 120 | England | Eddie Lovely | £0 | 2021 Q-School |
| 121 | Scotland | Alan Soutar | £0 | 2021 Q-School |
| 122 | England | Joe Murnan | £0 | 2021 Q-School |
| 125 | Australia | Gordon Mathers | £0 | 2021 Q-School |
| 124 | England | Peter Hudson | £0 | 2021 Q-School |
| 125 | Wales | Jonathan Worsley | £0 | 2021 Q-School |
| 126 | England | Brett Claydon | £0 | 2021 Q-School |
| 127 | England | John Brown | £0 | 2021 Q-School |
| 128 | United States | Danny Baggish | £0 | 2021 Q-School |

== Tour Cards per Nationes ==
| Nr. | Nation | Number of players | Differencd to prior Year |
|---|---|---|---|
| 1. | England | 59 | −1 |
| 2. | Netherlands | 16 | −3 |
| 3. | Germany | 7 | +2 |
| 3. | Scotland | 7 | +1 |
| 5. | Wales | 5 | −1 |
| 6. | Belgium | 4 | +1 |
| 6. | Ireland | 4 | +1 |
| 8. | Australia | 3 | ±0 |
| 8. | Northern Ireland | 3 | −1 |
| 8. | Austria | 3 | ±0 |
| 11. | Poland | 2 | ±0 |
| 11. | Spain | 2 | −1 |
| 11. | Czech Republic | 2 | +1 |
| 14. | Greece | 1 | ±0 |
| 14. | Hong Kong | 1 | ±0 |
| 14. | Canada | 1 | ±0 |
| 14. | Croatia | 1 | ±0 |
| 14. | Latvia | 1 | ±0 |
| 14. | Lithuania | 1 | ±0 |
| 14. | Portugal | 1 | ±0 |
| 14. | Russia | 1 | +1 |
| 14. | Sweden | 1 | ±0 |
| 14. | South Africa | 1 | ±0 |
| 14. | United States | 1 | +1 |
| | 24 Nations | 128 | |

== See also ==
- List of darts players
- List of darts players who have switched organisation
