= DJ Sayre =

American darts player

Personal information
- Full name: Dennis Sayre Junior
- Nickname: "DJ"
- Born: August 20, 1986 (age 40) Chillicothe, Ohio, U.S.
- Home town: Chillicothe, Ohio, U.S.

Sport
- Sport: Darts
- Playing since: 2009
- Darts: 20g
- Laterality: Right-handed
- Walk-on music: "Go D.J." by Lil Wayne

Organisation (see split in darts)
- PDC: 2009–2018

Other tournament wins
- Years
ADO Buckeye Open	2018
ADO Central Virginia Dart Classic	2013
ADO Great Lakes Dart Challenge	2012
ADO Indianapolis St. Pats Open	2010
ADO Shoot For The Moon	2015
ADO Youngstown Frank Perrico Memorial Charity Open	2015
Cleveland Darts Extraveganza	2010

Dennis "DJ" Sayre (born Dennis Sayre Jr.; August 20, 1986) is an American former professional darts player who played in Professional Darts Corporation (PDC) events.

Sayre made his World Series of Darts debut at the 2017 US Darts Masters, where he lost to Daryl Gurney of Northern Ireland, and he played in the 2018 US Darts Masters, where he lost to Gary Anderson of Scotland.
