= Dawson Murschell =

Canadian darts player

Personal information
- Nickname: "Awesome Dawson"
- Born: 23 November 1995 (age 30) Medicine Hat, Alberta, Canada
- Home town: Medicine Hat, Alberta, Canada

Sport
- Sport: Darts
- Playing since: 2008
- Darts: 22g Winmau Darts Signature
- Laterality: Right-handed
- Walk-on music: "September" by Earth, Wind and Fire

Organisation (see split in darts)
- BDO: 2011–2016
- PDC: 2017–2020

WDF major events – best performances
- World Masters: Last 80: 2015

PDC premier events – best performances
- UK Open: Last 128: 2019

Other tournament wins
- Years
Greater Vancouver Open	2015
Klondike Open	2023
Quebec Open	2015, 2016

Dawson Murschell (born 23 November 1995) is a Canadian former professional darts player who played in Professional Darts Corporation (PDC) events from 2017 to 2019.

== Career ==
Murschell first appeared in a televised darts tournament in 2017, when he took part in the North American Championship, defeating David Cameron, before losing to eventual winner, Willard Bruguier. By qualifying for that tournament, he also qualified for the 2017 US Darts Masters in Las Vegas, where he was drawn against James Wade in the first round. After surviving six match darts from "The Machine", Murschell hit double top to win and set up a quarter-final with Gerwyn Price, which he would go on to lose 8–4.

Murschell continued to make appearances in the PDC youth tour before 2018 Q school where he secured his card on the final day for 2018/19.

He reached the semi-finals in the North American Championship again in the 2018 edition. In the 2018 US Darts Masters, he beat Gerwyn Price 6–2. However, Murschell again lost in the quarter-finals 8–5 to Gary Anderson.

His performances on the pro tour were enough for him to be ranked as Canada's number 2, which allowed him to team-up with John Part at the 2018 PDC World Cup of Darts. The pair won their first-round game by beating Italy 5–1, but lost 2–0 in the second round to Japan.

Dawson's quarter-final run in Vegas secured his spot at the World Series of Darts Finals in Austria, although he wasn't able to compete due to falling ill, and had to pull out of the event.

At the 2019 PDC World Cup of Darts, captaining the Canadian team with Jim Long, he made it to the quarter-final stage, defeating Italy 5–3 in the first round, sensationally beating Australia 2–0 in the second round, and losing to Netherlands 2–1, despite winning 4–2 over 3-times world champion Michael van Gerwen in his individual match.

Following the expiration of his PDC pro tour card, in late November 2019 Murschell announced his intention to move home to Canada to focus on his education. Murschell confirmed that he would not be attending the PDC Q-School in January 2020 in an attempt to win back his tour card; but would instead combine his studies with playing on the North American Championship Darts Circuit.

His last darts event was qualification for the 2020 world championship.

He will appear at Modus Super Series in 2026.
