= Dave Richardson (darts player) =

Canadian darts player

Personal information
- Nickname: "Davey Boy"
- Born: 24 April 1979 (age 47) Paisley, Scotland
- Home town: Owen Sound, Ontario, Canada

Sport
- Sport: Darts
- Playing since: 1999
- Darts: 22 gram Harrows
- Laterality: Right-handed
- Walk-on music: "Lose Yourself" by Eminem

Organisation (see split in darts)
- PDC: 2008–

PDC premier events – best performances
- World Championship: Last 64: 2015

Other tournament wins
- Years
PDC North American Qualifying Event	2014

Dave Richardson (born 24 April 1979) is a Scottish-born Canadian professional darts player.

== Career ==
Richardson qualified for the 2015 PDC World Darts Championship after winning the North American Qualifier by beating Shaun Narain 3–1 in the final. He played against former runner-up Andy Hamilton in the first round and lost 3–2, having led 2–1 before Hamilton won the final two sets.

== World Championship results ==
=== PDC ===
- 2015: First round (lost to Andy Hamilton 2–3) (sets)
