= 2020 PDC Home Tour 3 =

Special darts tournament in 2020

2020 Home Tour Event 3

Tournament information
- Dates: 26 October – 11 December 2020
- Location: Various
- Country: Various
- Organisation(s): PDC
- Format: Legs
- Nine-dart finish: (Sweden) Daniel Larsson (Phase 1, Group 2)
- High checkout: 170 (England) Ryan Meikle (Phase 1, Group 5) (2x) (England) Michael Smith (Phase 1, Group 13) (Belgium) Kim Huybrechts (Phase 1, Group 15) (England) Luke Humphries (Championship Group)

Champion(s)
- (Australia) Damon Heta

The 2020 Home Tour Event 3 was the third tournament of the Home Tour Series organised by the Professional Darts Corporation for players to play indoor tournaments at their homes during the COVID-19 pandemic.

It began on 26 October 2020 and concluded on 11 December 2020. 45 various players competed during the Home Tour 3 tournament, including Home Tour 2 winner Luke Humphries, Top-32 players like Michael Smith, Krzysztof Ratajski, Simon Whitlock, Chris Dobey, Stephen Bunting and Steve Beaton.

Australian's Damon Heta was crown the 2020 Home Tour 3 champion, beating Chris Dobey of England 4–2 in the final, averaging just under 109. Heta also won the highly-competitive final Championship Group with five wins.

Daniel Larsson hit a nine-darter, the second of the Home Series, in his Group 2 match with Krzysztof Kciuk.

== Format ==
During Phase One, beginning on 26 October 2020, seven Tour Card players would play against each other over the course of a day, forming a round-robin format. Each player will participate in three groups, resulting in 18 groups. The results of all 18 groups will form the combined league table.

The championship group will contain the top seven players of the league table.

In all phases, each match will be a best of 7 legs match, with the winner of each match getting two points on the table. Should there be a tie on points after all the matches, the leg difference will determine positions, should that also be equal, the result between the two players is taken into account, following separated by legs won. Is there still no difference, the overall average of the players will then be taken into account.

== Phase One ==
All matches first to 4 (best-of-7 legs)

NB: P = Played; W = Won; L = Lost; LF = Legs for; LA = Legs against; +/− = Plus/minus Record, in relation to legs; Avg = Three-Dart average in group matches; Pts = Group Points

=== Group 1 – 26 October ===
Pos.	Player	P	W	L	LF	LA	+/–	Avg	Pts
1	(England) Andy Boulton	6	5	1	22	9	+13	92.63	10
2	(England) James Wilson	6	4	2	20	12	+8	90.46	8
3	(Scotland) William Borland	6	4	2	19	14	+5	89.78	8
4	(England) Luke Humphries	6	4	2	20	15	+5	94.42	8
5	(Wales) Barrie Bates	6	2	4	10	22	–12	79.65	4
6	(England) Adam Hunt	6	1	5	13	21	–8	93.77	2
7	(Wales) Jonathan Worsley	6	1	5	12	23	–11	76.67	2

86.97 Luke Humphries (England)	4 – 2	(Wales) Barrie Bates 91.90
86.97 James Wilson (England)	2 – 4	(England) Andy Boulton 97.26
76.13 Jonathan Worsley (Wales)	4 – 3	(Scotland) William Borland 79.91
93.16 Adam Hunt (England)	0 – 4	(England) Luke Humphries 103.66
72.59 Barrie Bates (Wales)	4 – 3	(Wales) Jonathan Worsley 74.11
94.29 William Borland (Scotland)	4 – 2	(England) James Wilson 92.90
96.93 Andy Boulton (England)	4 – 2	(England) Adam Hunt 89.12
77.13 Jonathan Worsley (Wales)	3 – 4	(England) Luke Humphries 86.88
88.41 James Wilson (England)	4 – 0	(Wales) Barrie Bates 75.23
95.43 Andy Boulton (England)	4 – 0	(Scotland) William Borland 91.65
106.37 Adam Hunt (England)	4 – 1	(Wales) Jonathan Worsley 81.14
96.58 Luke Humphries (England)	2 – 4	(England) James Wilson 90.64
71.32 Barrie Bates (Wales)	0 – 4	(England) Andy Boulton 87.13
86.75 William Borland (Scotland)	4 – 2	(England) Adam Hunt 94.19
89.73 James Wilson (England)	4 – 0	(Wales) Jonathan Worsley 70.68
94.00 Andy Boulton (England)	2 – 4	(England) Luke Humphries 97.96
89.73 William Borland (Scotland)	4 – 0	(Wales) Barrie Bates 73.82
85.62 Adam Hunt (England)	2 – 4	(England) James Wilson 94.12
80.76 Jonathan Worsley (Wales)	1 – 4	(England) Andy Boulton 85.01
94.64 Luke Humphries (England)	2 – 4	(Scotland) William Borland 96.33
93.03 Barrie Bates (Wales)	4 – 3	(England) Adam Hunt 94.15

=== Group 2 – 27 October ===
Pos.	Player	P	W	L	LF	LA	+/–	Avg	Pts
1	(England) Chris Dobey	6	5	1	23	11	+12	98.85	10
2	(Finland) Marko Kantele	6	5	1	21	11	+10	85.78	10
3	(Poland) Krzysztof Kciuk	6	4	2	19	17	+2	84.91	8
4	(Sweden) Daniel Larsson	6	3	3	17	15	+2	89.27	6
5	(England) David Pallett	6	3	3	20	21	–1	85.52	6
6	(England) Lisa Ashton	6	1	5	13	21	–8	83.23	2
7	(England) Ryan Meikle	6	0	6	7	24	–17	84.75	0

74.55 Marko Kantele (Finland)	1 – 4	(Sweden) Daniel Larsson 80.97
88.58 David Pallett (England)	4 – 3	(England) Ryan Meikle 83.82
84.62 Lisa Ashton (England)	3 – 4	(Poland) Krzysztof Kciuk 81.44
90.53 Chris Dobey (England)	3 – 4	(Finland) Marko Kantele 86.46
80.75 Daniel Larsson (Sweden)	4 – 2	(England) Lisa Ashton 79.35
84.43 Krzysztof Kciuk (Poland)	4 – 3	(England) David Pallett 82.72
100.59 Ryan Meikle (England)	2 – 4	(England) Chris Dobey 101.00
82.02 Lisa Ashton (England)	1 – 4	(Finland) Marko Kantele 84.21
89.97 David Pallett (England)	4 – 3	(Sweden) Daniel Larsson 96.65
79.21 Ryan Meikle (England)	1 – 4	(Poland) Krzysztof Kciuk 85.34
93.94 Chris Dobey (England)	4 – 0	(England) Lisa Ashton 85.05
89.37 Marko Kantele (Finland)	4 – 2	(England) David Pallett 84.22
92.49 Daniel Larsson (Sweden)	4 – 0	(England) Ryan Meikle 82.86
86.00 Krzysztof Kciuk (Poland)	2 – 4	(England) Chris Dobey 99.35
79.81 David Pallett (England)	4 – 3	(England) Lisa Ashton 87.27
81.65 Ryan Meikle (England)	0 – 4	(Finland) Marko Kantele 95.43
92.84 Krzysztof Kciuk (Poland)	4 – 2	(Sweden) Daniel Larsson 89.66
98.97 Chris Dobey (England)	4 – 3	(England) David Pallett 87.84
81.07 Lisa Ashton (England)	4 – 1	(England) Ryan Meikle 80.38
84.64 Marko Kantele (Finland)	4 – 1	(Poland) Krzysztof Kciuk 79.43
95.12 Daniel Larsson (Sweden)	0 – 4	(England) Chris Dobey 109.31

=== Group 3 – 28 October ===
Pos.	Player	P	W	L	LF	LA	+/–	Avg	Pts
1	(England) Steve Beaton	6	5	1	23	13	+10	94.71	10
2	(Northern Ireland) Mickey Mansell	6	5	1	23	15	+8	87.51	10
3	(England) Gary Blades	6	3	3	18	17	+1	83.87	6
4	(England) Joe Murnan	6	3	3	17	21	–4	81.32	6
5	(England) Alan Tabern	6	2	4	16	17	–1	90.33	4
6	(England) Richard North	6	2	4	16	21	–5	84.08	4
7	(England) Nathan Derry	6	1	5	13	22	–9	75.47	2

71.11 Nathan Derry (England)	1 – 4	(England) Gary Blades 68.64
86.58 Alan Tabern (England)	2 – 4	(Northern Ireland) Mickey Mansell 84.27
83.39 Steve Beaton (England)	3 – 4	(England) Richard North 92.03
71.85 Joe Murnan (England)	2 – 4	(England) Nathan Derry 72.17
90.30 Gary Blades (England)	1 – 4	(England) Steve Beaton 97.39
80.56 Richard North (England)	0 – 4	(England) Alan Tabern 105.47
86.37 Mickey Mansell (Northern Ireland)	4 – 1	(England) Joe Murnan 82.77
80.67 Steve Beaton (England)	4 – 2	(England) Nathan Derry 79.06
84.06 Alan Tabern (England)	2 – 4	(England) Gary Blades 82.06
96.00 Mickey Mansell (Northern Ireland)	4 – 3	(England) Richard North 88.47
87.25 Joe Murnan (England)	2 – 4	(England) Steve Beaton 95.33
86.00 Nathan Derry (England)	1 – 4	(England) Alan Tabern 90.04
84.34 Gary Blades (England)	2 – 4	(Northern Ireland) Mickey Mansell 86.91
77.87 Richard North (England)	3 – 4	(England) Joe Murnan 87.00
94.10 Alan Tabern (England)	1 – 4	(England) Steve Beaton 117.92
80.57 Mickey Mansell (Northern Ireland)	4 – 3	(England) Nathan Derry 71.13
88.02 Richard North (England)	2 – 4	(England) Gary Blades 93.61
77.46 Joe Murnan (England)	4 – 3	(England) Alan Tabern 81.73
93.55 Steve Beaton (England)	4 – 3	(Northern Ireland) Mickey Mansell 90.96
73.36 Nathan Derry (England)	2 – 4	(England) Richard North 77.53
84.27 Gary Blades (England)	3 – 4	(England) Joe Murnan 81.57

=== Group 4 – 2 November ===
Pos.	Player	P	W	L	LF	LA	+/–	Avg	Pts
1	(Australia) Simon Whitlock	6	6	0	24	10	+14	93.49	12
2	(England) James Wilson	6	3	3	18	12	+6	93.21	6
3	(Hong Kong) Kai Fan Leung	6	3	3	19	18	+1	91.54	6
4	(England) Richard North	6	3	3	14	16	–2	86.41	6
5	(Germany) Martin Schindler	6	3	3	16	18	–2	88.07	6
6	(England) Kirk Shepherd	6	2	4	14	22	–8	91.03	4
7	(Poland) Krzysztof Kciuk	6	1	5	14	23	–9	83.32	2

94.53 Kai Fan Leung (Hong Kong)	3 – 4	(Poland) Krzysztof Kciuk 81.87
89.28 Simon Whitlock (Australia)	4 – 2	(Germany) Martin Schindler 85.59
90.38 Kirk Shepherd (England)	0 – 4	(England) Richard North 95.43
89.21 James Wilson (England)	2 – 4	(Hong Kong) Kai Fan Leung 94.86
83.17 Krzysztof Kciuk (Poland)	3 – 4	(England) Kirk Shepherd 86.59
74.29 Richard North (England)	3 – 4	(Australia) Simon Whitlock 89.64
83.30 Martin Schindler (Germany)	0 – 4	(England) James Wilson 95.43
87.53 Kirk Shepherd (England)	3 – 4	(Hong Kong) Kai Fan Leung 89.52
90.42 Simon Whitlock (Australia)	4 – 3	(Poland) Krzysztof Kciuk 86.95
85.21 Martin Schindler (Germany)	2 – 4	(England) Richard North 90.19
94.56 James Wilson (England)	3 – 4	(England) Kirk Shepherd 99.34
96.41 Kai Fan Leung (Hong Kong)	2 – 4	(Australia) Simon Whitlock 92.41
78.73 Krzysztof Kciuk (Poland)	2 – 4	(Germany) Martin Schindler 91.98
78.13 Richard North (England)	0 – 4	(England) James Wilson 84.68
99.80 Simon Whitlock (Australia)	4 – 1	(England) Kirk Shepherd 92.21
90.96 Martin Schindler (Germany)	4 – 2	(Hong Kong) Kai Fan Leung 85.63
90.38 Richard North (England)	4 – 2	(Poland) Krzysztof Kciuk 85.07
101.44 James Wilson (England)	1 – 4	(Australia) Simon Whitlock 99.38
90.13 Kirk Shepherd (England)	2 – 4	(Germany) Martin Schindler 91.40
88.30 Kai Fan Leung (Hong Kong)	4 – 1	(England) Richard North 90.04
84.15 Krzysztof Kciuk (Poland)	0 – 4	(England) James Wilson 93.94

=== Group 5 – 3 November ===
Pos.	Player	P	W	L	LF	LA	+/–	Avg	Pts
1	(Poland) Krzysztof Ratajski	5	5	0	20	5	+15	96.05	10
2	(Netherlands) Martijn Kleermaker	5	3	2	16	16	0	91.10	6
3	(England) Ryan Meikle	5	3	2	15	16	–1	90.16	6
4	(Wales) Jonathan Worsley	5	2	3	13	18	–5	81.17	4
5	(Netherlands) Ron Meulenkamp	5	1	4	15	17	–2	93.34	2
6	(England) Stephen Bunting	5	1	4	11	18	–7	88.33	2
7	(England) Nathan Derry (withdrew)	4	0	4	7	16	–9	77.18	0

82.74 Jonathan Worsley (Wales)	2 – 4	(England) Ryan Meikle 94.78
93.25 Krzysztof Ratajski (Poland)	4 – 3	(England) Nathan Derry 81.31
86.90 Ron Meulenkamp (Netherlands)	2 – 4	(Netherlands) Martijn Kleermaker 93.95
88.17 Stephen Bunting (England)	4 – 2	(Wales) Jonathan Worsley 80.00
94.84 Ryan Meikle (England)	4 – 3	(Netherlands) Ron Meulenkamp 100.11
95.07 Martijn Kleermaker (Netherlands)	1 – 4	(Poland) Krzysztof Ratajski 97.29
76.53 Nathan Derry (England)	2 – 4	(England) Stephen Bunting 88.34
94.01 Ron Meulenkamp (Netherlands)	3 – 4	(Wales) Jonathan Worsley 89.58
111.33 Krzysztof Ratajski (Poland)	4 – 0	(England) Ryan Meikle 77.18
87.04 Nathan Derry (England)	1 – 4	(Netherlands) Martijn Kleermaker 95.65
91.19 Stephen Bunting (England)	1 – 4	(Netherlands) Ron Meulenkamp 96.04
67.15 Jonathan Worsley (Wales)	1 – 4	(Poland) Krzysztof Ratajski 92.70
86.97 Ryan Meikle (England)	4 – 1	(England) Nathan Derry 63.84
87.23 Martijn Kleermaker (Netherlands)	4 – 3	(England) Stephen Bunting 87.03
94.24 Krzysztof Ratajski (Poland)	4 – 3	(Netherlands) Ron Meulenkamp 89.65
Nathan Derry (England)	cancelled	(Wales) Jonathan Worsley
101.87 Martijn Kleermaker (Netherlands)	4 – 3	(England) Ryan Meikle 102.23
76.70 Stephen Bunting (England)	0 – 4	(Poland) Krzysztof Ratajski 84.68
Ron Meulenkamp (Netherlands)	cancelled	(England) Nathan Derry
86.38 Jonathan Worsley (Wales)	4 – 3	(Netherlands) Martijn Kleermaker 77.37
81.75 Ryan Meikle (England)	4 – 3	(England) Stephen Bunting 98.56

Nathan Derry had to withdraw after 4 games played. The results of the 4 games involving Derry did not count towards the tables.

=== Group 6 – 4 November ===
Pos.	Player	P	W	L	LF	LA	+/–	Avg	Pts
1	(England) Chris Dobey	6	5	1	22	11	+11	89.96	10
2	(England) Carl Wilkinson	6	5	1	23	14	+9	94.06	10
3	(England) Andy Hamilton	6	4	2	21	12	+9	95.32	8
4	(England) Peter Jacques	6	3	3	18	18	0	87.74	6
5	(England) Gary Blades	6	2	4	13	18	–5	87.43	4
6	(Netherlands) Geert Nentjes	6	1	5	13	21	–8	81.67	2
7	(Wales) Barrie Bates	6	1	5	7	23	–16	72.92	2

90.19 Carl Wilkinson (England)	4 – 2	(England) Peter Jacques 89.87
95.67 Chris Dobey (England)	4 – 3	(England) Andy Hamilton 90.57
89.73 Gary Blades (England)	4 – 0	(Wales) Barrie Bates 78.10
80.49 Geert Nentjes (Netherlands)	2 – 4	(England) Carl Wilkinson 90.44
82.34 Peter Jacques (England)	2 – 4	(England) Gary Blades 81.03
68.17 Barrie Bates (Wales)	1 – 4	(England) Chris Dobey 84.03
89.10 Andy Hamilton (England)	4 – 1	(Netherlands) Geert Nentjes 85.22
93.43 Gary Blades (England)	3 – 4	(England) Carl Wilkinson 94.81
78.03 Chris Dobey (England)	4 – 2	(England) Peter Jacques 83.02
103.66 Andy Hamilton (England)	4 – 0	(Wales) Barrie Bates 68.72
79.48 Geert Nentjes (Netherlands)	4 – 1	(England) Gary Blades 78.94
104.38 Carl Wilkinson (England)	4 – 2	(England) Chris Dobey 88.37
89.52 Peter Jacques (England)	4 – 2	(England) Andy Hamilton 90.15
78.66 Barrie Bates (Wales)	4 – 3	(Netherlands) Geert Nentjes 84.44
98.25 Chris Dobey (England)	4 – 1	(England) Gary Blades 85.46
94.79 Andy Hamilton (England)	4 – 3	(England) Carl Wilkinson 99.28
69.65 Barrie Bates (Wales)	1 – 4	(England) Peter Jacques 93.00
75.85 Geert Nentjes (Netherlands)	0 – 4	(England) Chris Dobey 95.43
96.00 Gary Blades (England)	0 – 4	(England) Andy Hamilton 103.66
85.28 Carl Wilkinson (England)	4 – 1	(Wales) Barrie Bates 74.21
88.66 Peter Jacques (England)	4 – 3	(Netherlands) Geert Nentjes 84.51

=== Group 7 – 5 November ===
Pos.	Player	P	W	L	LF	LA	+/–	Avg	Pts
1	(England) Alan Tabern	6	5	1	21	9	+12	96.21	10
2	(England) Andy Boulton	6	5	1	21	14	+7	98.65	10
3	(Netherlands) Martijn Kleermaker	6	3	3	20	15	+5	91.72	6
4	(England) Ross Smith	6	3	3	16	14	+2	91.71	6
5	(England) Steve West	6	3	3	16	20	–4	91.27	6
6	(Germany) Martin Schindler	6	1	5	10	21	–11	87.45	2
7	(England) David Pallett	6	1	5	11	22	–11	80.48	2

76.24 David Pallett (England)	2 – 4	(Netherlands) Martijn Kleermaker 81.39
81.53 Steve West (England)	0 – 4	(England) Andy Boulton 98.56
87.13 Alan Tabern (England)	4 – 0	(Germany) Martin Schindler 79.55
91.06 Ross Smith (England)	4 – 1	(England) David Pallett 87.50
97.93 Martijn Kleermaker (Netherlands)	2 – 4	(England) Alan Tabern 96.80
93.40 Martin Schindler (Germany)	2 – 4	(England) Steve West 93.40
107.17 Andy Boulton (England)	4 – 1	(England) Ross Smith 98.03
105.47 Alan Tabern (England)	4 – 0	(England) David Pallett 73.11
100.08 Steve West (England)	4 – 3	(Netherlands) Martijn Kleermaker 97.29
101.34 Andy Boulton (England)	4 – 3	(Germany) Martin Schindler 92.36
99.29 Ross Smith (England)	4 – 1	(England) Alan Tabern 91.75
95.01 David Pallett (England)	4 – 2	(England) Steve West 91.81
87.20 Martijn Kleermaker (Netherlands)	3 – 4	(England) Andy Boulton 95.60
84.30 Martin Schindler (Germany)	0 – 4	(England) Ross Smith 95.43
90.16 Steve West (England)	2 – 4	(England) Alan Tabern 93.51
89.66 Andy Boulton (England)	4 – 3	(England) David Pallett 80.95
96.46 Martin Schindler (Germany)	1 – 4	(Netherlands) Martijn Kleermaker 99.40
87.19 Ross Smith (England)	3 – 4	(England) Steve West 90.64
102.57 Alan Tabern (England)	4 – 1	(England) Andy Boulton 99.55
70.07 David Pallett (England)	1 – 4	(Germany) Martin Schindler 78.60
87.13 Martijn Kleermaker (Netherlands)	4 – 0	(England) Ross Smith 79.27

=== Group 8 – 23 November ===
Pos.	Player	P	W	L	LF	LA	+/–	Avg	Pts
1	(Belgium) Kim Huybrechts	6	5	1	21	10	+11	90.04	10
2	(England) Steve Brown	6	4	2	19	15	+4	88.06	8
3	(England) Steve Beaton	6	4	2	19	16	+3	85.03	8
4	(England) Carl Wilkinson	6	3	3	19	18	+1	87.38	6
5	(Scotland) William Borland	6	3	3	17	18	–1	85.88	6
6	(Scotland) John Henderson	6	1	5	13	21	–8	87.06	2
7	(Austria) Harald Leitinger	6	1	5	12	22	–10	84.77	2

90.84 William Borland (Scotland)	4 – 2	(England) Carl Wilkinson 85.13
89.73 Kim Huybrechts (Belgium)	4 – 0	(Scotland) John Henderson 77.05
90.03 Harald Leitinger (Austria)	3 – 4	(England) Steve Beaton 88.96
85.50 Steve Brown (England)	2 – 4	(Scotland) William Borland 93.86
95.73 Carl Wilkinson (England)	4 – 1	(Austria) Harald Leitinger 84.76
77.14 Steve Beaton (England)	1 – 4	(Belgium) Kim Huybrechts 79.63
84.98 John Henderson (Scotland)	2 – 4	(England) Steve Brown 85.02
86.11 Harald Leitinger (Austria)	2 – 4	(Scotland) William Borland 90.35
92.52 Kim Huybrechts (Belgium)	4 – 2	(England) Carl Wilkinson 83.74
101.11 John Henderson (Scotland)	2 – 4	(England) Steve Beaton 101.12
82.17 Steve Brown (England)	4 – 1	(Austria) Harald Leitinger 80.49
84.88 William Borland (Scotland)	2 – 4	(Belgium) Kim Huybrechts 90.28
90.06 Carl Wilkinson (England)	4 – 3	(Scotland) John Henderson 86.24
73.38 Steve Beaton (England)	4 – 1	(England) Steve Brown 74.49
92.23 Kim Huybrechts (Belgium)	4 – 1	(Austria) Harald Leitinger 82.65
90.94 John Henderson (Scotland)	4 – 1	(Scotland) William Borland 84.50
80.74 Steve Beaton (England)	2 – 4	(England) Carl Wilkinson 82.57
105.51 Steve Brown (England)	4 – 1	(Belgium) Kim Huybrechts 95.87
84.57 Harald Leitinger (Austria)	4 – 2	(Scotland) John Henderson 82.05
70.84 William Borland (Scotland)	2 – 4	(England) Steve Beaton 88.84
87.06 Carl Wilkinson (England)	3 – 4	(England) Steve Brown 95.69

=== Group 9 – 24 November ===
Pos.	Player	P	W	L	LF	LA	+/–	Avg	Pts
1	(England) Stephen Bunting	6	5	1	21	13	+8	94.74	10
2	(Hong Kong) Kai Fan Leung	6	4	2	20	18	+2	87.09	8
3	(Sweden) Daniel Larsson	6	3	3	20	18	+2	85.43	6
4	(England) Ross Smith	6	3	3	16	18	–2	91.33	6
5	(Republic of Ireland) Ciarán Teehan	6	2	4	18	20	–2	85.08	4
6	(England) Andy Hamilton	6	2	4	16	20	–4	88.89	4
7	(Northern Ireland) Mickey Mansell	6	2	4	17	21	–4	89.57	4

82.54 Kai Fan Leung (Hong Kong)	4 – 2	(Republic of Ireland) Ciarán Teehan 75.11
96.27 Daniel Larsson (Sweden)	4 – 1	(England) Stephen Bunting 93.74
93.17 Mickey Mansell (Northern Ireland)	2 – 4	(England) Ross Smith 96.44
82.10 Andy Hamilton (England)	3 – 4	(Hong Kong) Kai Fan Leung 85.37
88.00 Ciarán Teehan (Republic of Ireland)	2 – 4	(Northern Ireland) Mickey Mansell 98.60
82.09 Ross Smith (England)	2 – 4	(Sweden) Daniel Larsson 83.66
94.37 Stephen Bunting (England)	4 – 1	(England) Andy Hamilton 83.49
84.34 Mickey Mansell (Northern Ireland)	3 – 4	(Hong Kong) Kai Fan Leung 87.76
78.81 Daniel Larsson (Sweden)	3 – 4	(Republic of Ireland) Ciarán Teehan 82.00
104.04 Stephen Bunting (England)	4 – 1	(England) Ross Smith 97.31
91.27 Andy Hamilton (England)	4 – 3	(Northern Ireland) Mickey Mansell 88.39
84.51 Kai Fan Leung (Hong Kong)	4 – 2	(Sweden) Daniel Larsson 78.24
87.08 Ciarán Teehan (Republic of Ireland)	3 – 4	(England) Stephen Bunting 87.14
97.90 Ross Smith (England)	1 – 4	(England) Andy Hamilton 106.29
94.79 Daniel Larsson (Sweden)	3 – 4	(Northern Ireland) Mickey Mansell 87.32
100.80 Stephen Bunting (England)	4 – 3	(Hong Kong) Kai Fan Leung 97.70
84.39 Ross Smith (England)	4 – 3	(Republic of Ireland) Ciarán Teehan 90.98
85.14 Andy Hamilton (England)	3 – 4	(Sweden) Daniel Larsson 80.82
85.61 Mickey Mansell (Northern Ireland)	1 – 4	(England) Stephen Bunting 88.32
84.65 Kai Fan Leung (Hong Kong)	1 – 4	(England) Ross Smith 89.82
87.28 Ciarán Teehan (Republic of Ireland)	4 – 1	(England) Andy Hamilton 85.06

=== Group 10 – 25 November ===
Pos.	Player	P	W	L	LF	LA	+/–	Avg	Pts
1	(England) Steve West	6	5	1	21	10	+11	89.68	10
2	(England) Joe Murnan	6	4	2	19	14	+5	89.71	8
3	(Netherlands) Ron Meulenkamp	6	3	3	19	18	+1	93.79	6
4	(England) Peter Jacques	6	3	3	16	18	–2	86.96	6
5	(England) Steve Brown	6	3	3	16	19	–3	86.76	6
6	(Finland) Marko Kantele	6	2	4	16	19	–3	83.65	4
7	(England) Kirk Shepherd	6	1	5	13	22	–9	86.09	2

85.96 Steve Brown (England)	4 – 3	(England) Joe Murnan 89.97
94.25 Kirk Shepherd (England)	3 – 4	(England) Peter Jacques 94.24
86.03 Steve West (England)	4 – 1	(Finland) Marko Kantele 79.83
97.92 Ron Meulenkamp (Netherlands)	4 – 3	(England) Steve Brown 96.59
96.44 Joe Murnan (England)	4 – 1	(England) Steve West 86.91
84.41 Marko Kantele (Finland)	2 – 4	(England) Kirk Shepherd 96.33
94.26 Peter Jacques (England)	4 – 3	(Netherlands) Ron Meulenkamp 97.62
91.09 Steve West (England)	4 – 0	(England) Steve Brown 84.91
81.46 Kirk Shepherd (England)	2 – 4	(England) Joe Murnan 91.40
81.36 Peter Jacques (England)	2 – 4	(Finland) Marko Kantele 83.79
91.13 Ron Meulenkamp (Netherlands)	3 – 4	(England) Steve West 92.43
82.28 Steve Brown (England)	4 – 3	(England) Kirk Shepherd 89.53
77.95 Joe Murnan (England)	0 – 4	(England) Peter Jacques 87.13
77.54 Marko Kantele (Finland)	3 – 4	(Netherlands) Ron Meulenkamp 90.42
86.06 Kirk Shepherd (England)	1 – 4	(England) Steve West 93.85
81.82 Peter Jacques (England)	1 – 4	(England) Steve Brown 93.91
90.63 Marko Kantele (Finland)	2 – 4	(England) Joe Murnan 91.39
95.43 Ron Meulenkamp (Netherlands)	4 – 0	(England) Kirk Shepherd 68.90
87.74 Steve West (England)	4 – 1	(England) Peter Jacques 82.95
76.91 Steve Brown (England)	1 – 4	(Finland) Marko Kantele 85.69
91.13 Joe Murnan (England)	4 – 1	(Netherlands) Ron Meulenkamp 90.19

=== Group 11 – 1 December ===
Pos.	Player	P	W	L	LF	LA	+/–	Avg	Pts
1	(England) Michael Smith	6	5	1	22	12	+10	97.30	10
2	(England) Luke Humphries	6	4	2	22	12	+10	97.23	8
3	(England) Ross Smith	6	3	3	15	14	+1	89.30	6
4	(England) Steve Beaton	6	3	3	15	17	–2	91.45	6
5	(England) Conan Whitehead	6	3	3	17	19	–2	83.05	6
6	(England) Ryan Searle	6	2	4	13	20	–7	89.08	4
7	(England) Ryan Meikle	6	1	5	10	20	–10	83.88	2

88.75 Ross Smith (England)	4 – 1	(England) Ryan Searle 79.61
92.49 Ryan Meikle (England)	4 – 0	(England) Conan Whitehead 76.91
80.05 Steve Beaton (England)	0 – 4	(England) Luke Humphries 95.43
96.12 Michael Smith (England)	4 – 1	(England) Ross Smith 79.52
80.11 Ryan Searle (England)	1 – 4	(England) Steve Beaton 89.63
100.69 Luke Humphries (England)	4 – 2	(England) Ryan Meikle 85.87
79.86 Conan Whitehead (England)	3 – 4	(England) Michael Smith 89.92
92.52 Steve Beaton (England)	1 – 4	(England) Ross Smith 112.08
74.93 Ryan Meikle (England)	1 – 4	(England) Ryan Searle 96.19
86.60 Conan Whitehead (England)	4 – 3	(England) Luke Humphries 91.92
108.70 Michael Smith (England)	4 – 2	(England) Steve Beaton 101.53
95.43 Ross Smith (England)	4 – 0	(England) Ryan Meikle 72.25
83.44 Ryan Searle (England)	2 – 4	(England) Conan Whitehead 85.74
98.36 Luke Humphries (England)	4 – 2	(England) Michael Smith 90.97
90.06 Ryan Meikle (England)	2 – 4	(England) Steve Beaton 94.61
77.63 Conan Whitehead (England)	4 – 2	(England) Ross Smith 80.80
101.53 Luke Humphries (England)	3 – 4	(England) Ryan Searle 100.44
94.37 Michael Smith (England)	4 – 1	(England) Ryan Meikle 87.70
90.33 Steve Beaton (England)	4 – 2	(England) Conan Whitehead 91.53
79.20 Ross Smith (England)	0 – 4	(England) Luke Humphries 95.43
94.67 Ryan Searle (England)	1 – 4	(England) Michael Smith 103.71

=== Group 12 – 2 December ===
Pos.	Player	P	W	L	LF	LA	+/–	Avg	Pts
1	(England) Andy Boulton	6	6	0	24	6	+18	96.38	12
2	(Netherlands) Ron Meulenkamp	6	5	1	23	12	+11	91.58	10
3	(England) Peter Jacques	6	4	2	19	15	+4	87.48	8
4	(England) Andy Hamilton	6	2	4	15	21	–6	85.81	4
5	(Wales) Barrie Bates	6	2	4	9	19	–10	73.40	4
6	(England) David Pallett	6	1	5	13	20	–7	83.65	2
7	(England) Richard North	6	1	5	13	23	–10	83.42	2

90.91 Barrie Bates (Wales)	4 – 1	(England) Richard North 86.00
92.49 Ron Meulenkamp (Netherlands)	4 – 0	(England) David Pallett 85.86
93.94 Andy Boulton (England)	4 – 0	(England) Andy Hamilton 83.76
84.72 Peter Jacques (England)	4 – 1	(Wales) Barrie Bates 74.55
86.68 Richard North (England)	2 – 4	(England) Andy Boulton 89.31
90.66 Andy Hamilton (England)	3 – 4	(Netherlands) Ron Meulenkamp 95.13
82.49 David Pallett (England)	3 – 4	(England) Peter Jacques 87.73
101.90 Andy Boulton (England)	4 – 0	(Wales) Barrie Bates 71.89
79.70 Ron Meulenkamp (Netherlands)	4 – 2	(England) Richard North 81.14
85.34 David Pallett (England)	2 – 4	(England) Andy Hamilton 94.89
89.58 Peter Jacques (England)	0 – 4	(England) Andy Boulton 101.90
61.95 Barrie Bates (Wales)	0 – 4	(Netherlands) Ron Meulenkamp 93.94
81.80 Richard North (England)	4 – 3	(England) David Pallett 82.19
79.72 Andy Hamilton (England)	2 – 4	(England) Peter Jacques 82.92
91.94 Ron Meulenkamp (Netherlands)	3 – 4	(England) Andy Boulton 94.85
82.36 David Pallett (England)	4 – 0	(Wales) Barrie Bates 60.67
86.68 Andy Hamilton (England)	4 – 3	(England) Richard North 86.42
93.58 Peter Jacques (England)	3 – 4	(Netherlands) Ron Meulenkamp 96.26
– Andy Boulton (England)	4 – 1	(England) David Pallett –
80.43 Barrie Bates (Wales)	4 – 2	(England) Andy Hamilton 79.13
78.45 Richard North (England)	1 – 4	(England) Peter Jacques 86.33

=== Group 13 – 3 December ===
Pos.	Player	P	W	L	LF	LA	+/–	Avg	Pts
1	(England) Ryan Searle	6	5	1	22	10	+12	98.17	10
2	(Poland) Krzysztof Ratajski	6	4	2	21	13	+8	96.99	8
3	(England) Michael Smith	6	3	3	18	15	+3	94.61	6
4	(England) Joe Murnan	6	3	3	14	16	–2	90.98	6
5	(Republic of Ireland) Ciarán Teehan	6	3	3	14	20	–6	88.79	6
6	(Australia) Simon Whitlock	6	2	4	12	19	–7	89.58	4
7	(Netherlands) Geert Nentjes	6	1	5	12	20	–8	86.50	2

80.85 Ciarán Teehan (Republic of Ireland)	0 – 4	(Poland) Krzysztof Ratajski 96.97
78.32 Geert Nentjes (Netherlands)	1 – 4	(England) Michael Smith 82.66
81.80 Joe Murnan (England)	0 – 4	(England) Ryan Searle 100.20
90.87 Simon Whitlock (Australia)	4 – 1	(Republic of Ireland) Ciarán Teehan 76.60
97.58 Krzysztof Ratajski (Poland)	4 – 2	(England) Joe Murnan 91.72
83.50 Ryan Searle (England)	4 – 0	(Netherlands) Geert Nentjes 79.18
91.59 Michael Smith (England)	2 – 4	(Australia) Simon Whitlock 113.12
107.87 Joe Murnan (England)	4 – 1	(Republic of Ireland) Ciarán Teehan 100.38
85.65 Geert Nentjes (Netherlands)	2 – 4	(Poland) Krzysztof Ratajski 94.55
95.54 Michael Smith (England)	1 – 4	(England) Ryan Searle 109.69
87.88 Simon Whitlock (Australia)	1 – 4	(England) Joe Murnan 90.15
89.06 Ciarán Teehan (Republic of Ireland)	4 – 3	(Netherlands) Geert Nentjes 83.11
101.89 Krzysztof Ratajski (Poland)	2 – 4	(England) Michael Smith 108.37
103.10 Ryan Searle (England)	4 – 2	(Australia) Simon Whitlock 90.94
90.86 Geert Nentjes (Netherlands)	2 – 4	(England) Joe Murnan 97.55
95.58 Michael Smith (England)	3 – 4	(Republic of Ireland) Ciarán Teehan 90.84
96.20 Ryan Searle (England)	4 – 3	(Poland) Krzysztof Ratajski 94.53
77.61 Simon Whitlock (Australia)	0 – 4	(Netherlands) Geert Nentjes 101.90
76.80 Joe Murnan (England)	0 – 4	(England) Michael Smith 93.94
95.02 Ciarán Teehan (Republic of Ireland)	4 – 2	(England) Ryan Searle 96.33
96.43 Krzysztof Ratajski (Poland)	4 – 1	(Australia) Simon Whitlock 77.07

=== Group 14 – 4 December ===
Pos.	Player	P	W	L	LF	LA	+/–	Avg	Pts
1	(England) Michael Smith	6	6	0	24	6	+18	95.42	12
2	(England) Chris Dobey	6	5	1	20	9	+11	96.52	10
3	(England) Alan Tabern	6	4	2	21	15	+6	92.22	8
4	(Netherlands) Martijn Kleermaker	6	3	3	13	16	–3	87.00	6
5	(Finland) Marko Kantele	6	2	4	16	20	–4	85.55	4
6	(England) Adam Hunt	6	1	5	13	22	–9	84.57	2
7	(Austria) Harald Leitinger	6	0	6	5	24	–19	82.08	0

92.54 Alan Tabern (England)	4 – 3	(England) Adam Hunt 91.08
88.84 Martijn Kleermaker (Netherlands)	0 – 4	(England) Chris Dobey 105.47
92.61 Marko Kantele (Finland)	2 – 4	(England) Michael Smith 94.53
78.82 Harald Leitinger (Austria)	0 – 4	(England) Alan Tabern 107.36
82.24 Adam Hunt (England)	3 – 4	(Finland) Marko Kantele 85.34
92.49 Michael Smith (England)	4 – 0	(Netherlands) Martijn Kleermaker 84.10
96.59 Chris Dobey (England)	4 – 1	(Austria) Harald Leitinger 92.29
77.84 Marko Kantele (Finland)	3 – 4	(England) Alan Tabern 92.26
90.64 Martijn Kleermaker (Netherlands)	4 – 2	(England) Adam Hunt 87.97
85.50 Chris Dobey (England)	0 – 4	(England) Michael Smith 93.94
77.44 Harald Leitinger (Austria)	1 – 4	(Finland) Marko Kantele 85.06
77.91 Alan Tabern (England)	4 – 1	(Netherlands) Martijn Kleermaker 71.25
80.28 Adam Hunt (England)	0 – 4	(England) Chris Dobey 101.90
111.18 Michael Smith (England)	4 – 1	(Austria) Harald Leitinger 90.25
96.07 Martijn Kleermaker (Netherlands)	4 – 2	(Finland) Marko Kantele 90.46
93.70 Chris Dobey (England)	4 – 3	(England) Alan Tabern 94.59
85.87 Michael Smith (England)	4 – 1	(England) Adam Hunt 74.82
71.80 Harald Leitinger (Austria)	0 – 4	(Netherlands) Martijn Kleermaker 91.09
81.96 Marko Kantele (Finland)	1 – 4	(England) Chris Dobey 95.96
88.65 Alan Tabern (England)	2 – 4	(England) Michael Smith 94.52
91.03 Adam Hunt (England)	4 – 2	(Austria) Harald Leitinger 81.88

=== Group 15 – 7 December ===
Pos.	Player	P	W	L	LF	LA	+/–	Avg	Pts
1	(Australia) Damon Heta	6	6	0	24	7	+17	101.97	12
2	(England) James Wilson	6	4	2	20	16	+4	89.29	8
3	(Belgium) Kim Huybrechts	6	4	2	19	17	+2	87.11	8
4	(England) Carl Wilkinson	6	3	3	18	16	+2	90.57	6
5	(Germany) Martin Schindler	6	3	3	19	19	0	95.10	6
6	(Hong Kong) Kai Fan Leung	6	1	5	13	21	–8	87.97	2
7	(Scotland) William Borland	6	0	6	7	24	–17	81.77	0

94.20 Martin Schindler (Germany)	4 – 1	(Hong Kong) Kai Fan Leung 92.63
88.67 Kim Huybrechts (Belgium)	2 – 4	(England) James Wilson 82.19
88.41 Carl Wilkinson (England)	4 – 0	(Scotland) William Borland 80.95
99.72 Damon Heta (Australia)	4 – 1	(Germany) Martin Schindler 88.33
79.15 Kai Fan Leung (Hong Kong)	3 – 4	(England) Carl Wilkinson 89.14
63.04 William Borland (Scotland)	0 – 4	(Belgium) Kim Huybrechts 74.22
92.92 James Wilson (England)	3 – 4	(Australia) Damon Heta 97.44
90.35 Carl Wilkinson (England)	3 – 4	(Germany) Martin Schindler 100.60
88.51 Kim Huybrechts (Belgium)	4 – 3	(Hong Kong) Kai Fan Leung 93.11
87.90 James Wilson (England)	4 – 2	(Scotland) William Borland 82.70
113.43 Damon Heta (Australia)	4 – 0	(England) Carl Wilkinson 96.71
93.14 Martin Schindler (Germany)	3 – 4	(Belgium) Kim Huybrechts 92.01
90.16 Kai Fan Leung (Hong Kong)	1 – 4	(England) James Wilson 96.97
94.21 William Borland (Scotland)	1 – 4	(Australia) Damon Heta 105.17
87.80 Kim Huybrechts (Belgium)	4 – 3	(England) Carl Wilkinson 86.78
95.08 James Wilson (England)	4 – 3	(Germany) Martin Schindler 95.81
82.44 William Borland (Scotland)	1 – 4	(Hong Kong) Kai Fan Leung 90.15
96.26 Damon Heta (Australia)	4 – 1	(Belgium) Kim Huybrechts 91.45
92.04 Carl Wilkinson (England)	4 – 1	(England) James Wilson 80.68
98.52 Martin Schindler (Germany)	4 – 3	(Scotland) William Borland 87.26
82.64 Kai Fan Leung (Hong Kong)	1 – 4	(Australia) Damon Heta 99.80

=== Group 16 – 8 December ===
Pos.	Player	P	W	L	LF	LA	+/–	Avg	Pts
1	(England) Steve West	6	5	1	21	8	+13	95.79	10
2	(Northern Ireland) Mickey Mansell	6	5	1	22	13	+9	82.70	10
3	(Scotland) John Henderson	6	4	2	19	13	+6	89.92	8
4	(England) Stephen Bunting	6	3	3	17	15	+2	94.38	6
5	(Australia) Damon Heta	6	2	4	12	20	–8	89.25	4
6	(Austria) Harald Leitinger	6	1	5	12	23	–11	88.12	2
7	(Sweden) Daniel Larsson	6	1	5	11	22	–11	85.17	2

79.55 Daniel Larsson (Sweden)	1 – 4	(Northern Ireland) Mickey Mansell 84.10
91.09 Stephen Bunting (England)	4 – 0	(Australia) Damon Heta 92.81
103.66 Steve West (England)	4 – 0	(Austria) Harald Leitinger 96.16
77.13 John Henderson (Scotland)	2 – 4	(Sweden) Daniel Larsson 88.36
78.85 Mickey Mansell (Northern Ireland)	4 – 1	(England) Steve West 86.60
87.21 Harald Leitinger (Austria)	3 – 4	(England) Stephen Bunting 89.71
92.21 Damon Heta (Australia)	2 – 4	(Scotland) John Henderson 94.85
87.15 Steve West (England)	4 – 1	(Sweden) Daniel Larsson 89.84
89.35 Stephen Bunting (England)	3 – 4	(Northern Ireland) Mickey Mansell 83.04
96.99 Damon Heta (Australia)	4 – 2	(Austria) Harald Leitinger 87.23
86.00 John Henderson (Scotland)	1 – 4	(England) Steve West 102.00
87.88 Daniel Larsson (Sweden)	0 – 4	(England) Stephen Bunting 107.36
86.69 Mickey Mansell (Northern Ireland)	4 – 1	(Australia) Damon Heta 84.00
87.79 Harald Leitinger (Austria)	0 – 4	(Scotland) John Henderson 98.56
101.06 Stephen Bunting (England)	1 – 4	(England) Steve West 111.04
84.64 Damon Heta (Australia)	4 – 2	(Sweden) Daniel Larsson 85.69
88.00 Harald Leitinger (Austria)	3 – 4	(Northern Ireland) Mickey Mansell 86.94
96.28 John Henderson (Scotland)	4 – 1	(England) Stephen Bunting 87.72
84.30 Steve West (England)	4 – 1	(Australia) Damon Heta 84.84
79.69 Daniel Larsson (Sweden)	3 – 4	(Austria) Harald Leitinger 82.31
76.57 Mickey Mansell (Northern Ireland)	2 – 4	(Scotland) John Henderson 86.71

=== Group 17 – 9 December ===
Pos.	Player	P	W	L	LF	LA	+/–	Avg	Pts
1	(England) Luke Humphries	6	4	2	20	16	+4	94.73	8
2	(Poland) Krzysztof Kciuk	6	4	2	20	18	+2	92.50	8
3	(Belgium) Kim Huybrechts	6	3	3	19	16	+3	96.35	6
4	(Poland) Krzysztof Ratajski	6	3	3	18	17	+1	96.61	6
5	(England) Ritchie Edhouse	6	3	3	15	17	–2	87.37	6
6	(England) Ryan Searle	6	3	3	17	19	–2	90.79	6
7	(Wales) Jonathan Worsley	6	1	5	15	21	–6	88.03	2

104.56 Krzysztof Ratajski (Poland)	3 – 4	(Poland) Krzysztof Kciuk 101.55
84.90 Ritchie Edhouse (England)	1 – 4	(Belgium) Kim Huybrechts 92.59
90.74 Jonathan Worsley (Wales)	4 – 1	(England) Ryan Searle 84.07
93.99 Luke Humphries (England)	1 – 4	(Poland) Krzysztof Ratajski 96.62
92.74 Krzysztof Kciuk (Poland)	4 – 3	(Wales) Jonathan Worsley 97.63
89.45 Ryan Searle (England)	2 – 4	(England) Ritchie Edhouse 83.25
96.79 Kim Huybrechts (Belgium)	2 – 4	(England) Luke Humphries 97.40
96.42 Jonathan Worsley (Wales)	3 – 4	(Poland) Krzysztof Ratajski 91.91
84.94 Ritchie Edhouse (England)	4 – 2	(Poland) Krzysztof Kciuk 87.82
93.05 Kim Huybrechts (Belgium)	3 – 4	(England) Ryan Searle 89.71
82.75 Luke Humphries (England)	4 – 3	(Wales) Jonathan Worsley 81.16
101.24 Krzysztof Ratajski (Poland)	4 – 1	(England) Ritchie Edhouse 89.17
83.76 Krzysztof Kciuk (Poland)	4 – 2	(Belgium) Kim Huybrechts 89.81
98.91 Ryan Searle (England)	4 – 3	(England) Luke Humphries 96.19
90.85 Ritchie Edhouse (England)	4 – 1	(Wales) Jonathan Worsley 82.31
103.63 Kim Huybrechts (Belgium)	4 – 2	(Poland) Krzysztof Ratajski 95.12
85.31 Ryan Searle (England)	2 – 4	(Poland) Krzysztof Kciuk 96.14
97.57 Luke Humphries (England)	4 – 1	(England) Ritchie Edhouse 91.11
79.89 Jonathan Worsley (Wales)	1 – 4	(Belgium) Kim Huybrechts 102.21
90.21 Krzysztof Ratajski (Poland)	1 – 4	(England) Ryan Searle 97.30
92.97 Krzysztof Kciuk (Poland)	2 – 4	(England) Luke Humphries 100.48

Jonathan Worsley (Wales)	cancelled	(England) Ritchie Edhouse
90.23 Luke Humphries (England)	2 – 4	(England) Ryan Searle 92.45

Final two games are an addition to the schedule, further to two matches not played in Group 5. These fixtures do not count towards the Group 17 or Overall League Tables.

=== Group 18 – 10 December ===
Pos.	Player	P	W	L	LF	LA	+/–	Avg	Pts
1	(Scotland) John Henderson	6	5	1	23	15	+8	93.00	10
2	(Australia) Damon Heta	6	4	2	22	14	+8	99.69	8
3	(Republic of Ireland) Ciarán Teehan	6	3	3	18	15	+3	91.66	6
4	(England) Kirk Shepherd	6	3	3	16	16	0	87.91	6
5	(Australia) Simon Whitlock	6	3	3	16	18	–2	93.69	6
6	(Netherlands) Geert Nentjes	6	2	4	15	19	–4	87.53	4
7	(England) Gary Blades	6	1	5	9	22	–13	79.16	2

78.65 Gary Blades (England)	4 – 2	(Netherlands) Geert Nentjes 78.42
95.46 John Henderson (Scotland)	4 – 2	(Republic of Ireland) Ciarán Teehan 77.53
99.33 Damon Heta (Australia)	4 – 2	(England) Kirk Shepherd 84.17
96.43 Simon Whitlock (Australia)	4 – 2	(England) Gary Blades 85.48
90.72 Geert Nentjes (Netherlands)	2 – 4	(Australia) Damon Heta 96.40
82.44 Kirk Shepherd (England)	1 – 4	(Scotland) John Henderson 89.44
93.20 Ciarán Teehan (Republic of Ireland)	4 – 1	(Australia) Simon Whitlock 89.70
92.49 Damon Heta (Australia)	4 – 0	(England) Gary Blades 71.43
92.10 John Henderson (Scotland)	3 – 4	(Netherlands) Geert Nentjes 94.34
100.59 Ciarán Teehan (Republic of Ireland)	2 – 4	(England) Kirk Shepherd 106.94
103.88 Simon Whitlock (Australia)	4 – 3	(Australia) Damon Heta 100.53
81.66 Gary Blades (England)	2 – 4	(Scotland) John Henderson 90.96
92.88 Geert Nentjes (Netherlands)	1 – 4	(Republic of Ireland) Ciarán Teehan 100.12
80.80 Kirk Shepherd (England)	1 – 4	(Australia) Simon Whitlock 100.12
96.57 John Henderson (Scotland)	4 – 3	(Australia) Damon Heta 105.87
85.80 Ciarán Teehan (Republic of Ireland)	4 – 1	(England) Gary Blades 78.90
79.18 Kirk Shepherd (England)	4 – 2	(Netherlands) Geert Nentjes 80.39
85.35 Simon Whitlock (Australia)	3 – 4	(Scotland) John Henderson 93.48
103.50 Damon Heta (Australia)	4 – 2	(Republic of Ireland) Ciarán Teehan 92.71
78.81 Gary Blades (England)	0 – 4	(England) Kirk Shepherd 93.94
88.41 Geert Nentjes (Netherlands)	4 – 0	(Australia) Simon Whitlock 86.68

== League table ==
NB: P = Games played; W = Won; L = Lost; LF = Legs for; LA = Legs against; +/− = Plus/minus Record, in relation to legs; Avg = Three-Dart average in group matches; Pts = Group Points

All results from the 18 groups of Phase One are combined into the League table. The top 7 players qualify for the Championship group.

Should there be a tie on points after all the matches, the leg difference will determine positions, should that also be equal, the result between the two players is taken into account, following separated by legs won. Is there still no difference, the overall average of the players will then be taken into account.

Pos.	Groups	Player	P	W	L	LF	LA	+/−	Avg	Pts	Qualification
1	1; 7; 12	(England) Andy Boulton	18	16	2	67	29	+38	95.89	32	Q
2	2; 6; 14	(England) Chris Dobey	18	15	3	65	31	+34	95.11	30	Q
3	11; 13; 14	(England) Michael Smith	18	14	4	64	33	+31	95.78	28	Q
4	7; 10; 16	(England) Steve West	18	13	5	58	38	+20	92.25	26	Q
5	5; 13; 17	(Poland) Krzysztof Ratajski	17	12	5	59	35	+24	96.58	24	Q
6	1; 11; 17	(England) Luke Humphries	18	12	6	62	43	+19	95.46	24	Q
7	15; 16; 18	(Australia) Damon Heta	18	12	6	58	41	+17	96.97	24	Q
8	8; 15; 17	(Belgium) Kim Huybrechts	18	12	6	59	43	+16	91.17	24	Eliminated
9	3; 9; 16	(Northern Ireland) Mickey Mansell	18	12	6	62	49	+13	86.59	24	Eliminated
10	3; 8; 11	(England) Steve Beaton	18	12	6	57	46	+11	90.40	24	Eliminated
11	1; 4; 15	(England) James Wilson	18	11	7	58	40	+18	90.99	22	Eliminated
12	3; 7; 14	(England) Alan Tabern	18	11	7	58	41	+17	92.92	22	Eliminated
13	6; 8; 15	(England) Carl Wilkinson	18	11	7	60	48	+12	90.67	22	Eliminated
14	4; 13; 18	(Australia) Simon Whitlock	18	11	7	52	47	+5	92.26	22	Eliminated
15	8; 16; 18	(Scotland) John Henderson	18	10	8	55	49	+6	89.99	20	Eliminated
16	11; 13; 17	(England) Ryan Searle	18	10	8	52	49	+3	92.68	20	Eliminated
17	6; 10; 12	(England) Peter Jacques	18	10	8	53	51	+2	87.39	20	Eliminated
18	3; 10; 13	(England) Joe Murnan	18	10	8	50	51	–1	87.34	20	Eliminated
19	5; 10; 12	(Netherlands) Ron Meulenkamp	17	9	8	57	47	+10	92.91	18	Eliminated
20	2; 10; 14	(Finland) Marko Kantele	18	9	9	53	50	+3	85.00	18	Eliminated
21	5; 9; 16	(England) Stephen Bunting	17	9	8	49	46	+3	92.54	18	Eliminated
22	5; 7; 14	(Netherlands) Martijn Kleermaker	17	9	8	49	47	+2	89.85	18	Eliminated
23	7; 9; 11	(England) Ross Smith	18	9	9	47	46	+1	90.78	18	Eliminated
24	2; 4; 17	(Poland) Krzysztof Kciuk	18	9	9	53	58	–5	86.91	18	Eliminated
25	6; 9; 12	(England) Andy Hamilton	18	8	10	52	53	–1	90.01	16	Eliminated
26	4; 9; 15	(Hong Kong) Kai Fan Leung	18	8	10	52	57	–5	88.87	16	Eliminated
27	9; 13; 18	(Republic of Ireland) Ciarán Teehan	18	8	10	50	55	–5	88.51	16	Eliminated
28	8; 10	(England) Steve Brown	12	7	5	35	34	+1	87.41	14	Eliminated
29	2; 9; 16	(Sweden) Daniel Larsson	18	7	11	48	55	–7	86.62	14	Eliminated
30	4; 7; 15	(Germany) Martin Schindler	18	7	11	45	58	–13	90.21	14	Eliminated
31	1; 8; 15	(Scotland) William Borland	18	7	11	43	56	–13	85.81	14	Eliminated
32	3; 4; 12	(England) Richard North	18	6	12	43	60	–17	84.64	12	Eliminated
33	4; 10; 18	(England) Kirk Shepherd	18	6	12	43	60	–17	88.34	12	Eliminated
34	3; 6; 18	(England) Gary Blades	18	6	12	40	57	–17	83.49	12	Eliminated
35	2; 7; 12	(England) David Pallett	18	5	13	44	63	–19	83.22	10	Eliminated
36	1; 6; 12	(Wales) Barrie Bates	18	5	13	26	64	–38	75.33	10	Eliminated
37	6; 13; 18	(Netherlands) Geert Nentjes	18	4	14	40	60	–20	85.24	8	Eliminated
38	1; 5; 17	(Wales) Jonathan Worsley	17	4	13	40	62	–22	82.14	8	Eliminated
39	2; 5; 11	(England) Ryan Meikle	17	4	13	32	60	–28	86.27	8	Eliminated
40	11	(England) Conan Whitehead	6	3	3	17	19	–2	83.05	6	Eliminated
41	17	(England) Ritchie Edhouse	6	3	3	15	17	–2	87.37	6	Eliminated
42	1; 14	(England) Adam Hunt	12	2	10	26	43	–17	89.47	4	Eliminated
43	8; 14; 16	(Austria) Harald Leitinger	18	2	16	29	69	–40	84.99	4	Eliminated
44	2	(England) Lisa Ashton	6	1	5	13	21	–8	83.23	2	Eliminated
45	3; 5	(England) Nathan Derry	6	1	5	13	22	–9	75.47	2	Eliminated

== Championship Group (11 December) ==
All matches first to 4 (best-of-7 legs)

NB: P = Played; W = Won; L = Lost; LF = Legs for; LA = Legs against; +/− = Plus/minus Record, in relation to legs; Avg = Three-Dart average in group matches; Pts = Group Points

The top two players of the Championship Group qualified for the Championship Final to decide the Home Tour III Winner.

=== Standings ===
Pos.	Player	P	W	L	LF	LA	+/–	Avg	Pts
1	(Australia) Damon Heta	6	5	1	21	12	+9	100.44	10
2	(England) Chris Dobey	6	4	2	21	14	+7	93.60	8
3	(England) Andy Boulton	6	4	2	17	13	+4	94.92	8
4	(Poland) Krzysztof Ratajski	6	3	3	19	18	+1	97.08	6
5	(England) Luke Humphries	6	3	3	15	20	–5	95.84	6
6	(England) Michael Smith	6	2	4	17	17	0	98.53	4
7	(England) Steve West	6	0	6	8	24	−16	86.41	0

93.88 Krzysztof Ratajski (Poland)	4 – 3	(England) Chris Dobey 94.25
79.98 Steve West (England)	3 – 4	(England) Luke Humphries 93.55
86.43 Damon Heta (Australia)	1 – 4	(England) Andy Boulton 100.81
97.55 Michael Smith (England)	2 – 4	(Poland) Krzysztof Ratajski 98.36
92.85 Chris Dobey (England)	2 – 4	(Australia) Damon Heta 100.95
105.47 Andy Boulton (England)	4 – 0	(England) Steve West 86.37
99.86 Luke Humphries (England)	4 – 3	(England) Michael Smith 90.31
107.83 Damon Heta (Australia)	4 – 3	(Poland) Krzysztof Ratajski 105.30
90.71 Steve West (England)	2 – 4	(England) Chris Dobey 89.01
91.38 Luke Humphries (England)	2 – 4	(England) Andy Boulton 95.30
93.97 Michael Smith (England)	1 – 4	(Australia) Damon Heta 100.40
95.69 Krzysztof Ratajski (Poland)	4 – 1	(England) Steve West 91.01
– Chris Dobey (England)	4 – 1	(England) Luke Humphries –
81.96 Andy Boulton (England)	1 – 4	(England) Michael Smith 98.88
89.17 Steve West (England)	2 – 4	(Australia) Damon Heta 93.57
97.02 Luke Humphries (England)	4 – 2	(Poland) Krzysztof Ratajski 93.89
95.53 Andy Boulton (England)	0 – 4	(England) Chris Dobey 101.90
113.43 Michael Smith (England)	4 – 0	(England) Steve West 81.24
113.43 Damon Heta (Australia)	4 – 0	(England) Luke Humphries 97.38
95.34 Krzysztof Ratajski (Poland)	2 – 4	(England) Andy Boulton 90.44
90.00 Chris Dobey (England)	4 – 3	(England) Michael Smith 97.04

=== Championship Group Final ===
	Final (Best of 7 Legs)	
108.80 Damon Heta (Australia)	4 – 2	(England) Chris Dobey 97.33
