= 2020 PDC Home Tour 2 =

Special darts tournament in 2020

2020 Home Tour Event 2

Tournament information
- Dates: 31 August–20 October 2020
- Location: Various
- Country: Various
- Organisation(s): PDC
- Format: Legs
- High checkout: 170 (Belgium) Mike De Decker (Phase 1, Group 1) (England) Alan Tabern (Phase 1, Group 2) (England) Chris Dobey (2x) (Phase 1, Group 9) (Phase 3, Group 2) (Netherlands) Jermaine Wattimena (Phase 2, Group 1) (Germany) Gabriel Clemens (Phase 2, Group 2) (England) Ross Smith (Phase 2, Group 4) (Wales) Nick Kenny (Phase 3, Group 2) (Wales) Jonny Clayton (Phase 3, Group 3)

Champion(s)
- (England) Luke Humphries

The 2020 Home Tour Event 2 was the second staging of the Home Tour tournament organised by the Professional Darts Corporation for players to play indoor tournaments at their homes during the COVID-19 pandemic.

It began on 31 August 2020 and concluded on 20 October 2020. The tournament was open to the 70 lowest-ranked PDC Tour Card holders who entered, although the tournament also featured Top-32 players like Krzysztof Ratajski, Chris Dobey, Jonny Clayton, Stephen Bunting, Jermaine Wattimena, Jeffrey de Zwaan, Steve Beaton and Ricky Evans.

Future World Champion and the future world number one Luke Humphries won his first professional title in winning the 2020 Home Tour Event 2, as he won the final Championship Group. In a high-class and tight affair he won ahead of Jonny Clayton on leg-difference, with five wins each. Damon Heta, who hit an 118.96 average during the Championship Group matches, the highest in both PDC Home Tours, finished third in the Championship Group.

== Format ==
Beginning on 31 August 2020, seven Tour Card players would play against each other over the course of a day, with the top three from each day and the five best fourth-best players going into a last 35 stage, beginning on 30 September 2020.

In the second phase, the 35 players will again be put into groups of seven, where all players will play each other over one day. The top four in each group and the best fifth-placed player in the second phase will then move into a semi-final group stage taking place from 12 to 14 October, with the top two in each group and the best third-placed player moving forward to the Championship Group stage on 20 October, where the winner will become the champion.

In all phases, each match will be a best of 9 legs match, with the winner of each match getting two points on the table. Should there be a tie on points after all the matches, the leg difference will determine positions, should that also be equal, the result between the two players is taken into account. Should there be a three-way tie or more, the overall average of the players will then be taken into account.

== Phase One ==
All matches first to 5 (best-of-9 legs)

NB: P = Played; W = Won; L = Lost; LF = Legs for; LA = Legs against; +/− = Plus/minus record, in relation to legs; Avg = Three-dart average in group matches; Pts = Group points

=== Group 1 – 31 August ===
Pos.	Player	P	W	L	LF	LA	+/–	Avg	Pts
1	(Belgium) Mike De Decker	6	5	1	27	15	+12	89.99	10
2	(England) Andy Boulton	6	4	2	26	17	+9	89.96	8
3	(England) Joe Murnan	6	4	2	24	18	+6	86.82	8
4	(Netherlands) Geert Nentjes	6	3	3	24	22	+2	86.64	6
5	(England) Adrian Gray	6	2	4	20	24	–4	81.32	4
6	(England) Conan Whitehead	6	2	4	16	25	–9	83.43	4
7	(England) David Pallett	6	1	5	12	28	–16	78.29	2

84.55 Mike De Decker (Belgium)	5 – 4	(Netherlands) Geert Nentjes 80.21
78.60 Conan Whitehead (England)	5 – 2	(England) Joe Murnan 74.02
78.61 Adrian Gray (England)	2 – 5	(England) Andy Boulton 88.38
74.12 David Pallett (England)	1 – 5	(Belgium) Mike De Decker 89.34
84.87 Geert Nentjes (Netherlands)	3 – 5	(England) Adrian Gray 81.00
90.66 Andy Boulton (England)	5 – 2	(England) Conan Whitehead 82.79
83.50 Joe Murnan (England)	5 – 0	(England) David Pallett 74.64
80.37 Adrian Gray (England)	3 – 5	(Belgium) Mike De Decker 90.53
89.14 Conan Whitehead (England)	1 – 5	(Netherlands) Geert Nentjes 94.61
93.77 Joe Murnan (England)	5 – 4	(England) Andy Boulton 89.76
76.95 David Pallett (England)	1 – 5	(England) Adrian Gray 85.29
91.65 Mike De Decker (Belgium)	5 – 0	(England) Conan Whitehead 90.04
84.80 Geert Nentjes (Netherlands)	5 – 2	(England) Joe Murnan 83.15
91.26 Andy Boulton (England)	5 – 1	(England) David Pallett 80.77
86.62 Conan Whitehead (England)	5 – 3	(England) Adrian Gray 85.76
100.34 Joe Murnan (England)	5 – 2	(Belgium) Mike De Decker 93.22
90.82 Andy Boulton (England)	5 – 2	(Netherlands) Geert Nentjes 91.38
80.21 David Pallett (England)	5 – 3	(England) Conan Whitehead 73.12
76.90 Adrian Gray (England)	2 – 5	(England) Joe Murnan 86.15
90.62 Mike De Decker (Belgium)	5 – 2	(England) Andy Boulton 84.06
83.94 Geert Nentjes (Netherlands)	5 – 4	(England) David Pallett 83.04

=== Group 2 – 1 September ===
Pos.	Player	P	W	L	LF	LA	+/–	Avg	Pts
1	(Wales) Jamie Lewis	6	6	0	30	14	+16	95.26	12
2	(England) Adam Hunt	6	4	2	22	18	+4	89.40	8
3	(England) Alan Tabern	6	3	3	25	16	+9	93.81	6
4	(England) Matthew Edgar	6	3	3	22	22	0	87.23	6
5	(England) Gary Blades	6	3	3	18	23	–5	82.31	6
6	(England) Carl Wilkinson	6	1	5	19	25	–6	89.12	2
7	(Wales) Barrie Bates	6	1	5	10	28	–18	84.98	2

84.27 Jamie Lewis (Wales)	5 – 2	(England) Gary Blades 75.55
86.70 Adam Hunt (England)	5 – 4	(England) Carl Wilkinson 81.79
86.38 Matthew Edgar (England)	3 – 5	(Wales) Barrie Bates 89.01
90.73 Alan Tabern (England)	4 – 5	(Wales) Jamie Lewis 93.45
79.55 Gary Blades (England)	5 – 2	(England) Matthew Edgar 81.08
79.96 Barrie Bates (Wales)	1 – 5	(England) Adam Hunt 87.90
84.86 Carl Wilkinson (England)	1 – 5	(England) Alan Tabern 89.91
96.75 Matthew Edgar (England)	2 – 5	(Wales) Jamie Lewis 97.05
94.29 Adam Hunt (England)	5 – 1	(England) Gary Blades 80.64
102.95 Carl Wilkinson (England)	5 – 0	(Wales) Barrie Bates 80.74
89.64 Alan Tabern (England)	4 – 5	(England) Matthew Edgar 88.23
97.84 Jamie Lewis (Wales)	5 – 1	(England) Adam Hunt 88.81
83.06 Gary Blades (England)	5 – 4	(England) Carl Wilkinson 85.29
94.83 Barrie Bates (Wales)	0 – 5	(England) Alan Tabern 107.36
84.76 Adam Hunt (England)	1 – 5	(England) Matthew Edgar 83.43
98.10 Carl Wilkinson (England)	3 – 5	(Wales) Jamie Lewis 94.62
81.15 Barrie Bates (Wales)	2 – 5	(England) Gary Blades 88.82
87.59 Alan Tabern (England)	2 – 5	(England) Adam Hunt 93.91
87.51 Matthew Edgar (England)	5 – 2	(England) Carl Wilkinson 81.72
104.35 Jamie Lewis (Wales)	5 – 2	(Wales) Barrie Bates 84.16
86.21 Gary Blades (England)	0 – 5	(England) Alan Tabern 97.60

=== Group 3 – 2 September ===
Pos.	Player	P	W	L	LF	LA	+/–	Avg	Pts
1	(Northern Ireland) Mickey Mansell	6	6	0	30	5	+25	91.32	12
2	(England) Kirk Shepherd	6	5	1	26	18	+8	85.05	10
3	(England) Steve Brown	6	4	2	24	18	+6	84.65	8
4	(England) Lisa Ashton	6	3	3	22	22	0	81.56	6
5	(Netherlands) Martijn Kleermaker	6	2	4	20	26	−6	82.48	4
6	(Poland) Krzysztof Kciuk	6	1	5	17	29	–12	73.90	2
7	(England) Nathan Derry	6	0	6	9	30	–21	78.60	0

77.13 Martijn Kleermaker (Netherlands)	5 – 4	(Poland) Krzysztof Kciuk 82.13
83.50 Mickey Mansell (Northern Ireland)	5 – 0	(England) Nathan Derry 72.43
74.68 Lisa Ashton (England)	1 – 5	(England) Steve Brown 80.16
89.31 Kirk Shepherd (England)	5 – 2	(Netherlands) Martijn Kleermaker 85.82
74.39 Krzysztof Kciuk (Poland)	3 – 5	(England) Lisa Ashton 75.27
91.07 Steve Brown (England)	1 – 5	(Northern Ireland) Mickey Mansell 103.41
79.30 Nathan Derry (England)	2 – 5	(England) Kirk Shepherd 84.63
77.33 Lisa Ashton (England)	5 – 4	(Netherlands) Martijn Kleermaker 83.52
88.12 Mickey Mansell (Northern Ireland)	5 – 1	(Poland) Krzysztof Kciuk 82.70
82.12 Nathan Derry (England)	1 – 5	(England) Steve Brown 87.26
88.73 Kirk Shepherd (England)	5 – 4	(England) Lisa Ashton 86.25
80.26 Martijn Kleermaker (Netherlands)	0 – 5	(Northern Ireland) Mickey Mansell 90.54
70.10 Krzysztof Kciuk (Poland)	5 – 4	(England) Nathan Derry 78.88
82.94 Steve Brown (England)	3 – 5	(England) Kirk Shepherd 80.42
94.37 Mickey Mansell (Northern Ireland)	5 – 2	(England) Lisa Ashton 86.35
74.33 Nathan Derry (England)	2 – 5	(Netherlands) Martijn Kleermaker 86.04
80.57 Steve Brown (England)	5 – 2	(Poland) Krzysztof Kciuk 66.94
85.78 Kirk Shepherd (England)	1 – 5	(Northern Ireland) Mickey Mansell 87.98
89.46 Lisa Ashton (England)	5 – 0	(England) Nathan Derry 84.56
82.13 Martijn Kleermaker (Netherlands)	4 – 5	(England) Steve Brown 85.92
67.16 Krzysztof Kciuk (Poland)	2 – 5	(England) Kirk Shepherd 81.45

=== Group 4 – 7 September ===
Pos.	Player	P	W	L	LF	LA	+/–	Avg	Pts
1	(England) James Wilson	6	5	1	27	19	+8	86.47	10
2	(England) Andy Hamilton	6	4	2	24	16	+8	92.43	8
3	(England) Bradley Brooks	6	4	2	24	20	+4	89.60	8
4	(England) Ted Evetts	6	3	3	22	20	+2	81.09	6
5	(England) Jamie Hughes	6	3	3	19	21	–2	86.64	6
6	(Scotland) William Borland	6	2	4	21	22	–1	84.78	4
7	(Austria) Harald Leitinger	6	0	6	11	30	–19	79.87	0

93.39 William Borland (Scotland)	5 – 1	(Austria) Harald Leitinger 93.00
83.32 Bradley Brooks (England)	5 – 3	(England) Jamie Hughes 86.22
101.55 Andy Hamilton (England)	5 – 0	(England) Ted Evetts 85.33
87.04 James Wilson (England)	5 – 4	(Scotland) William Borland 92.09
86.31 Harald Leitinger (Austria)	3 – 5	(England) Andy Hamilton 93.83
90.25 Ted Evetts (England)	4 – 5	(England) Bradley Brooks 90.02
75.88 Jamie Hughes (England)	1 – 5	(England) James Wilson 85.77
83.00 Andy Hamilton (England)	1 – 5	(Scotland) William Borland 94.39
100.20 Bradley Brooks (England)	5 – 0	(Austria) Harald Leitinger 81.00
77.45 Jamie Hughes (England)	0 – 5	(England) Ted Evetts 88.41
85.15 James Wilson (England)	2 – 5	(England) Andy Hamilton 92.36
80.78 William Borland (Scotland)	3 – 5	(England) Bradley Brooks 82.40
74.09 Harald Leitinger (Austria)	2 – 5	(England) Jamie Hughes 87.36
78.02 Ted Evetts (England)	3 – 5	(England) James Wilson 82.07
91.94 Bradley Brooks (England)	1 – 5	(England) Andy Hamilton 94.14
91.90 Jamie Hughes (England)	5 – 1	(Scotland) William Borland 73.52
70.16 Ted Evetts (England)	5 – 2	(Austria) Harald Leitinger 65.31
93.48 James Wilson (England)	5 – 3	(England) Bradley Brooks 89.72
89.72 Andy Hamilton (England)	3 – 5	(England) Jamie Hughes 101.01
74.52 William Borland (Scotland)	3 – 5	(England) Ted Evetts 74.38
79.52 Harald Leitinger (Austria)	3 – 5	(England) James Wilson 85.32

=== Group 5 – 8 September ===
Pos.	Player	P	W	L	LF	LA	+/–	Avg	Pts
1	(Finland) Marko Kantele	6	5	1	27	16	+11	87.03	10
2	(Sweden) Daniel Larsson	6	4	2	24	16	+8	91.57	8
3	(Australia) Damon Heta	6	4	2	25	19	+6	96.55	8
4	(South Africa) Devon Petersen	6	3	3	23	17	+6	90.81	6
5	(Hong Kong) Kai Fan Leung	6	3	3	25	22	+3	91.93	6
6	(England) Ryan Joyce	6	1	5	13	29	–16	84.98	2
7	(Greece) John Michael	6	1	5	11	29	–18	87.57	2

93.39 Damon Heta (Australia)	5 – 3	(Sweden) Daniel Larsson 77.10
80.27 John Michael (Greece)	3 – 5	(Finland) Marko Kantele 80.96
95.85 Kai Fan Leung (Hong Kong)	5 – 3	(South Africa) Devon Petersen 93.43
94.58 Ryan Joyce (England)	5 – 4	(Australia) Damon Heta 98.70
93.92 Daniel Larsson (Sweden)	5 – 4	(Hong Kong) Kai Fan Leung 95.79
93.94 Devon Petersen (South Africa)	5 – 0	(Greece) John Michael 90.96
95.07 Marko Kantele (Finland)	5 – 2	(England) Ryan Joyce 83.49
87.74 Kai Fan Leung (Hong Kong)	2 – 5	(Australia) Damon Heta 96.76
84.64 John Michael (Greece)	0 – 5	(Sweden) Daniel Larsson 101.55
86.65 Marko Kantele (Finland)	5 – 1	(South Africa) Devon Petersen 85.04
83.49 Ryan Joyce (England)	1 – 5	(Hong Kong) Kai Fan Leung 98.87
105.85 Damon Heta (Australia)	5 – 0	(Greece) John Michael 91.78
94.68 Daniel Larsson (Sweden)	5 – 2	(Finland) Marko Kantele 80.83
81.40 Devon Petersen (South Africa)	5 – 1	(England) Ryan Joyce 74.25
88.10 John Michael (Greece)	3 – 5	(Hong Kong) Kai Fan Leung 90.63
93.69 Marko Kantele (Finland)	5 – 1	(Australia) Damon Heta 85.29
87.03 Devon Petersen (South Africa)	5 – 1	(Sweden) Daniel Larsson 80.63
81.89 Ryan Joyce (England)	4 – 5	(Greece) John Michael 89.64
82.68 Kai Fan Leung (Hong Kong)	4 – 5	(Finland) Marko Kantele 84.96
99.31 Damon Heta (Australia)	5 – 4	(South Africa) Devon Petersen 104.02
101.55 Daniel Larsson (Sweden)	5 – 0	(England) Ryan Joyce 92.17

=== Group 6 – 9 September ===
Pos.	Player	P	W	L	LF	LA	+/–	Avg	Pts
1	(England) Ryan Meikle	6	6	0	30	15	+15	89.86	12
2	(England) Ross Smith	6	5	1	28	12	+16	92.65	10
3	(Germany) Gabriel Clemens	6	3	3	21	18	+3	83.84	6
4	(England) Luke Woodhouse	6	3	3	22	21	+1	86.32	6
5	(Netherlands) Ron Meulenkamp	6	3	3	19	20	–1	91.84	6
6	(Netherlands) Vincent van der Meer	6	1	5	12	26	–14	81.60	2
7	(Republic of Ireland) William O'Connor	6	0	6	10	30	–20	85.21	0

78.65 Vincent van der Meer (Netherlands)	1 – 5	(Germany) Gabriel Clemens 85.60
97.31 Ron Meulenkamp (Netherlands)	5 – 2	(Republic of Ireland) William O'Connor 88.51
88.98 Ross Smith (England)	5 – 1	(England) Luke Woodhouse 87.43
84.71 Ryan Meikle (England)	5 – 2	(Netherlands) Vincent van der Meer 82.96
82.76 Gabriel Clemens (Germany)	1 – 5	(England) Ross Smith 88.69
89.42 Luke Woodhouse (England)	2 – 5	(Netherlands) Ron Meulenkamp 91.90
91.93 William O'Connor (Republic of Ireland)	3 – 5	(England) Ryan Meikle 94.84
94.94 Ross Smith (England)	5 – 2	(Netherlands) Vincent van der Meer 85.03
82.83 Ron Meulenkamp (Netherlands)	1 – 5	(Germany) Gabriel Clemens 86.41
85.61 William O'Connor (Republic of Ireland)	2 – 5	(England) Luke Woodhouse 88.38
97.24 Ryan Meikle (England)	5 – 3	(England) Ross Smith 97.07
82.71 Vincent van der Meer (Netherlands)	1 – 5	(Netherlands) Ron Meulenkamp 96.45
89.22 Gabriel Clemens (Germany)	5 – 1	(Republic of Ireland) William O'Connor 85.61
85.50 Luke Woodhouse (England)	4 – 5	(England) Ryan Meikle 86.48
92.16 Ron Meulenkamp (Netherlands)	2 – 5	(England) Ross Smith 91.31
80.31 William O'Connor (Republic of Ireland)	1 – 5	(Netherlands) Vincent van der Meer 83.26
81.20 Luke Woodhouse (England)	5 – 3	(Germany) Gabriel Clemens 82.31
90.06 Ryan Meikle (England)	5 – 1	(Netherlands) Ron Meulenkamp 90.41
94.91 Ross Smith (England)	5 – 1	(Republic of Ireland) William O'Connor 79.30
76.97 Vincent van der Meer (Netherlands)	1 – 5	(England) Luke Woodhouse 85.99
76.74 Gabriel Clemens (Germany)	2 – 5	(England) Ryan Meikle 85.81

=== Group 7 – 21 September ===
Pos.	Player	P	W	L	LF	LA	+/–	Avg	Pts
1	(Wales) Jonny Clayton	6	4	2	26	16	+10	95.40	8
2	(Netherlands) Jermaine Wattimena	6	4	2	27	18	+9	93.77	8
3	(Netherlands) Jeffrey de Zwaan	6	4	2	25	17	+8	88.86	8
4	(Netherlands) Ron Meulenkamp	6	4	2	25	19	+6	91.70	8
5	(Wales) Nick Kenny	6	3	3	20	20	0	87.05	6
6	(England) Stephen Bunting	6	1	5	13	28	–15	90.29	2
7	(Scotland) William Borland	6	1	5	11	29	–18	84.36	2

82.45 Jeffrey de Zwaan (Netherlands)	2 – 5	(Netherlands) Ron Meulenkamp 80.80
100.20 Jermaine Wattimena (Netherlands)	5 – 0	(England) Stephen Bunting 90.46
83.54 Nick Kenny (Wales)	2 – 5	(Wales) Jonny Clayton 89.02
81.39 William Borland (Scotland)	0 – 5	(Netherlands) Jeffrey de Zwaan 88.41
89.66 Ron Meulenkamp (Netherlands)	5 – 2	(Wales) Nick Kenny 86.45
89.59 Jonny Clayton (Wales)	3 – 5	(Netherlands) Jermaine Wattimena 93.77
97.25 Stephen Bunting (England)	4 – 5	(Scotland) William Borland 90.75
80.44 Nick Kenny (Wales)	1 – 5	(Netherlands) Jeffrey de Zwaan 89.43
101.97 Jermaine Wattimena (Netherlands)	5 – 2	(Netherlands) Ron Meulenkamp 99.03
86.04 Stephen Bunting (England)	0 – 5	(Wales) Jonny Clayton 92.78
77.00 William Borland (Scotland)	0 – 5	(Wales) Nick Kenny 92.78
93.16 Jeffrey de Zwaan (Netherlands)	5 – 4	(Netherlands) Jermaine Wattimena 92.06
87.50 Ron Meulenkamp (Netherlands)	3 – 5	(England) Stephen Bunting 92.30
104.16 Jonny Clayton (Wales)	5 – 1	(Scotland) William Borland 93.07
87.68 Jermaine Wattimena (Netherlands)	3 – 5	(Wales) Nick Kenny 93.85
85.19 Stephen Bunting (England)	2 – 5	(Netherlands) Jeffrey de Zwaan 85.73
99.14 Jonny Clayton (Wales)	3 – 5	(Netherlands) Ron Meulenkamp 107.56
81.23 William Borland (Scotland)	3 – 5	(Netherlands) Jermaine Wattimena 86.93
85.23 Nick Kenny (Wales)	5 – 2	(England) Stephen Bunting 90.47
96.00 Jeffrey de Zwaan (Netherlands)	3 – 5	(Wales) Jonny Clayton 97.72
85.65 Ron Meulenkamp (Netherlands)	5 – 2	(Scotland) William Borland 82.73

=== Group 8 – 22 September ===
Pos.	Player	P	W	L	LF	LA	+/–	Avg	Pts
1	(England) Luke Humphries	6	6	0	30	8	+22	99.21	12
2	(Hong Kong) Kai Fan Leung	6	5	1	26	16	+10	89.59	10
3	(Germany) Martin Schindler	6	4	2	26	23	+3	89.31	8
4	(England) Jamie Hughes	6	2	4	19	21	–2	85.60	4
5	(England) Gary Blades	6	2	4	15	23	–8	78.76	4
6	(England) Adrian Gray	6	1	5	15	26	–11	79.61	2
7	(England) Lisa Ashton	6	1	5	13	27	–14	80.06	2

79.67 Martin Schindler (Germany)	5 – 4	(England) Gary Blades 71.25
78.14 Jamie Hughes (England)	1 – 5	(England) Adrian Gray 84.62
86.43 Lisa Ashton (England)	0 – 5	(England) Luke Humphries 104.38
86.80 Kai Fan Leung (Hong Kong)	5 – 3	(Germany) Martin Schindler 81.84
85.42 Gary Blades (England)	5 – 2	(England) Lisa Ashton 80.69
95.42 Luke Humphries (England)	5 – 3	(England) Jamie Hughes 84.30
82.73 Adrian Gray (England)	2 – 5	(Hong Kong) Kai Fan Leung 93.55
82.32 Lisa Ashton (England)	4 – 5	(Germany) Martin Schindler 90.51
82.94 Jamie Hughes (England)	5 – 1	(England) Gary Blades 74.80
82.22 Adrian Gray (England)	1 – 5	(England) Luke Humphries 90.81
79.50 Kai Fan Leung (Hong Kong)	5 – 2	(England) Lisa Ashton 75.92
95.17 Martin Schindler (Germany)	5 – 1	(England) Jamie Hughes 83.41
80.41 Gary Blades (England)	5 – 1	(England) Adrian Gray 67.72
107.49 Luke Humphries (England)	5 – 1	(Hong Kong) Kai Fan Leung 97.59
95.13 Jamie Hughes (England)	5 – 0	(England) Lisa Ashton 71.58
83.12 Adrian Gray (England)	4 – 5	(Germany) Martin Schindler 88.00
96.35 Luke Humphries (England)	5 – 0	(England) Gary Blades 83.58
86.13 Kai Fan Leung (Hong Kong)	5 – 4	(England) Jamie Hughes 89.70
83.43 Lisa Ashton (England)	5 – 2	(England) Adrian Gray 77.24
100.66 Martin Schindler (Germany)	3 – 5	(England) Luke Humphries 100.78
77.11 Gary Blades (England)	0 – 5	(Hong Kong) Kai Fan Leung 93.94

=== Group 9 – 23 September ===
Pos.	Player	P	W	L	LF	LA	+/–	Avg	Pts
1	(Wales) Nick Kenny	6	6	0	30	14	+16	91.81	12
2	(England) Chris Dobey	6	4	2	24	15	+9	97.61	8
3	(Wales) Barrie Bates	6	3	3	20	21	–1	84.65	6
4	(England) Ricky Evans	6	3	3	20	24	–4	85.88	6
5	(England) Callan Rydz	6	2	4	21	25	–4	82.39	4
6	(England) Conan Whitehead	6	2	4	19	25	–6	84.82	4
7	(Poland) Krzysztof Kciuk	6	1	5	18	28	–10	84.10	2

75.02 Krzysztof Kciuk (Poland)	3 – 5	(England) Ricky Evans 84.67
80.80 Conan Whitehead (England)	2 – 5	(Wales) Barrie Bates 85.70
81.47 Nick Kenny (Wales)	5 – 4	(England) Callan Rydz 84.39
97.69 Chris Dobey (England)	5 – 2	(Poland) Krzysztof Kciuk 89.64
80.47 Ricky Evans (England)	1 – 5	(Wales) Nick Kenny 85.57
83.08 Callan Rydz (England)	5 – 3	(England) Conan Whitehead 74.04
76.50 Barrie Bates (Wales)	0 – 5	(England) Chris Dobey 96.35
89.84 Nick Kenny (Wales)	5 – 3	(Poland) Krzysztof Kciuk 88.66
87.59 Conan Whitehead (England)	5 – 2	(England) Ricky Evans 86.12
84.33 Barrie Bates (Wales)	5 – 2	(England) Callan Rydz 83.07
99.46 Chris Dobey (England)	1 – 5	(Wales) Nick Kenny 105.15
83.91 Krzysztof Kciuk (Poland)	3 – 5	(England) Conan Whitehead 85.12
88.54 Ricky Evans (England)	2 - 5	(Wales) Barrie Bates 91.64
82.94 Callan Rydz (England)	2 – 5	(England) Chris Dobey 87.84
91.57 Conan Whitehead (England)	3 – 5	(Wales) Nick Kenny 91.79
86.23 Barrie Bates (Wales)	3 – 5	(Poland) Krzysztof Kciuk 91.09
80.87 Callan Rydz (England)	3 – 5	(England) Ricky Evans 84.85
104.37 Chris Dobey (England)	5 – 1	(England) Conan Whitehead 89.82
97.02 Nick Kenny (Wales)	5 – 2	(Wales) Barrie Bates 83.51
76.30 Krzysztof Kciuk (Poland)	2 – 5	(England) Callan Rydz 79.98
91.02 Ricky Evans (England)	5 – 3	(England) Chris Dobey 99.94

=== Group 10 – 24 September ===
Pos.	Player	P	W	L	LF	LA	+/–	Avg	Pts
1	(Poland) Krzysztof Ratajski	6	5	1	29	12	+17	95.55	10
2	(Belgium) Kim Huybrechts	6	5	1	28	16	+12	88.05	10
3	(England) Stephen Bunting	6	3	3	25	20	+5	92.81	6
4	(England) Carl Wilkinson	6	3	3	24	21	+3	89.02	6
5	(Greece) John Michael	6	3	3	20	23	–3	88.96	6
6	(England) Matthew Edgar	6	1	5	13	29	–16	85.54	2
7	(England) Steve Beaton	6	1	5	8	26	–18	82.46	2

97.20 Kim Huybrechts (Belgium)	5 – 1	(Greece) John Michael 81.80
94.21 Krzysztof Ratajski (Poland)	5 – 2	(England) Carl Wilkinson 87.86
89.57 Stephen Bunting (England)	5 – 1	(England) Steve Beaton 77.24
80.67 Matthew Edgar (England)	2 – 5	(Belgium) Kim Huybrechts 85.72
94.17 John Michael (Greece)	5 – 4	(England) Stephen Bunting 90.09
80.41 Steve Beaton (England)	0 – 5	(Poland) Krzysztof Ratajski 93.94
82.33 Carl Wilkinson (England)	4 – 5	(England) Matthew Edgar 86.73
95.80 Stephen Bunting (England)	5 – 3	(Belgium) Kim Huybrechts 89.64
99.00 Krzysztof Ratajski (Poland)	5 – 1	(Greece) John Michael 97.26
88.41 Carl Wilkinson (England)	5 – 0	(England) Steve Beaton 81.00
84.80 Matthew Edgar (England)	1 – 5	(England) Stephen Bunting 93.00
87.81 Kim Huybrechts (Belgium)	5 – 4	(Poland) Krzysztof Ratajski 86.53
83.36 John Michael (Greece)	3 – 5	(England) Carl Wilkinson 88.15
87.60 Steve Beaton (England)	5 – 1	(England) Matthew Edgar 81.65
101.86 Krzysztof Ratajski (Poland)	5 – 3	(England) Stephen Bunting 98.06
88.04 Carl Wilkinson (England)	3 – 5	(Belgium) Kim Huybrechts 85.97
87.43 Steve Beaton (England)	1 – 5	(Greece) John Michael 88.92
90.07 Matthew Edgar (England)	1 – 5	(Poland) Krzysztof Ratajski 97.78
90.33 Stephen Bunting (England)	3 – 5	(England) Carl Wilkinson 99.33
81.96 Kim Huybrechts (Belgium)	5 – 1	(England) Steve Beaton 81.08
88.26 John Michael (Greece)	5 – 3	(England) Matthew Edgar 89.30

=== Ranking of fourth-placed players ===
Pos.	Group	Player	P	W	L	LF	LA	+/−	Avg	Pts	Qualification
1	7	(Netherlands) Ron Meulenkamp	6	4	2	25	19	+6	91.70	8	Advance to Phase Two
2	5	(South Africa) Devon Petersen	6	3	3	23	17	+6	90.81	6	Advance to Phase Two
3	10	(England) Carl Wilkinson	6	3	3	24	21	+3	89.02	6	Advance to Phase Two
4	1	(Netherlands) Geert Nentjes	6	3	3	24	22	+2	86.64	6	Advance to Phase Two
5	4	(England) Ted Evetts	6	3	3	22	20	+2	81.09	6	Advance to Phase Two
6	6	(England) Luke Woodhouse	6	3	3	22	21	+1	86.32	6	Advance as alternates
7	2	(England) Matthew Edgar	6	3	3	22	22	0	87.23	6	Advance as alternates
8	3	(England) Lisa Ashton	6	3	3	22	22	0	81.56	6	Eliminated
9	9	(England) Ricky Evans	6	3	3	20	24	–4	85.88	6	Eliminated
10	8	(England) Jamie Hughes	6	2	4	19	21	–2	85.60	4	Eliminated

== Phase Two ==
All matches first to 5 (best-of-9 legs)

NB: P = Played; W = Won; L = Lost; LF = Legs for; LA = Legs against; +/− = Plus/minus record, in relation to legs; Avg = Three-dart average in group matches; Pts = Group points

Jamie Lewis and Devon Petersen have withdrawn, therefore Luke Woodhouse and Matthew Edgar qualified as the next best-performing fourth placed players in Phase One. Andy Hamilton withdrew due to a hand injury and was replaced by Alan Tabern.

=== Qualified players ===
Group Winners

- (Northern Ireland) Mickey Mansell
- (England) Luke Humphries
- ~~(Wales) Jamie Lewis~~
- (Wales) Nick Kenny
- (England) Ryan Meikle
- (Poland) Krzysztof Ratajski
- (Belgium) Mike De Decker
- (Finland) Marko Kantele
- (England) James Wilson
- (Wales) Jonny Clayton

Group Runner-ups

- (England) Ross Smith
- (Belgium) Kim Huybrechts
- (Hong Kong) Kai Fan Leung
- (England) Kirk Shepherd
- (England) Chris Dobey
- (Netherlands) Jermaine Wattimena
- (England) Andy Boulton
- ~~(England) Andy Hamilton~~
- (Sweden) Daniel Larsson
- (England) Adam Hunt

Group Third

- (Netherlands) Jeffrey de Zwaan
- (Australia) Damon Heta
- (England) Joe Murnan
- (England) Steve Brown
- (England) Bradley Brooks
- (Germany) Martin Schindler
- (England) Alan Tabern
- (England) Stephen Bunting
- (Germany) Gabriel Clemens
- (Wales) Barrie Bates

Best Fourth

- (Netherlands) Ron Meulenkamp
- (South Africa) ~~Devon Petersen~~
- (England) Carl Wilkinson
- (Netherlands) Geert Nentjes
- (England) Ted Evetts
- (England) Luke Woodhouse
- (England) Matthew Edgar

=== Group 1 – 29 September ===
Pos.	Player	P	W	L	LF	LA	+/–	Avg	Pts
1	(Wales) Jonny Clayton	6	5	1	29	16	+13	102.25	10
2	(Netherlands) Jermaine Wattimena	6	5	1	27	17	+10	97.41	10
3	(England) Chris Dobey	6	5	1	26	18	+8	95.58	10
4	(Belgium) Kim Huybrechts	6	3	3	23	21	+2	94.68	6
5	(England) Alan Tabern	6	2	4	22	22	0	94.15	4
6	(England) Stephen Bunting	6	1	5	12	28	–16	88.50	2
7	(Sweden) Daniel Larsson	6	0	6	13	30	–17	90.90	0

94.19 Jermaine Wattimena (Netherlands)	5 – 4	(Sweden) Daniel Larsson95.02
90.84 Kim Huybrechts (Belgium)	3 – 5	(England) Chris Dobey 99.16
97.39 Stephen Bunting (England)	3 – 5	(Wales) Jonny Clayton 94.34
95.02 Alan Tabern (England)	2 – 5	(Netherlands) Jermaine Wattimena 100.74
81.57 Daniel Larsson (Sweden)	3 – 5	(England) Stephen Bunting 83.87
101.43 Jonny Clayton (Wales)	5 – 2	(Belgium) Kim Huybrechts 99.49
97.63 Chris Dobey (England)	5 – 4	(England) Alan Tabern 89.24
92.69 Stephen Bunting (England)	2 – 5	(Netherlands) Jermaine Wattimena 99.18
92.14 Kim Huybrechts (Belgium)	5 – 2	(Sweden) Daniel Larsson 87.54
96.52 Chris Dobey (England)	5 – 4	(Wales) Jonny Clayton 101.93
94.52 Alan Tabern (England)	5 – 1	(England) Stephen Bunting 80.77
87.50 Jermaine Wattimena (Netherlands)	5 – 3	(Belgium) Kim Huybrechts 92.65
91.46 Daniel Larsson (Sweden)	1 – 5	(England) Chris Dobey 95.69
96.20 Jonny Clayton (Wales)	5 – 2	(England) Alan Tabern 92.65
92.78 Kim Huybrechts (Belgium)	5 – 0	(England) Stephen Bunting 88.96
93.76 Chris Dobey (England)	1 – 5	(Netherlands) Jermaine Wattimena 98.22
108.19 Jonny Clayton (Wales)	5 – 2	(Sweden) Daniel Larsson94.43
96.16 Alan Tabern (England)	4 – 5	(Belgium) Kim Huybrechts 100.20
87.30 Stephen Bunting (England)	1 – 5	(England) Chris Dobey 90.74
104.63 Jermaine Wattimena (Netherlands)	2 – 5	(Wales) Jonny Clayton 111.40
95.39 Daniel Larsson (Sweden)	1 – 5	(England) Alan Tabern 97.28

=== Group 2 – 30 September ===
Pos.	Player	P	W	L	LF	LA	+/–	Avg	Pts
1	(Poland) Krzysztof Ratajski	6	5	1	29	19	+10	96.87	10
2	(England) Bradley Brooks	6	4	2	26	21	+5	86.59	8
3	(Hong Kong) Kai Fan Leung	6	4	2	23	20	+3	93.06	8
4	(Germany) Gabriel Clemens	6	3	3	18	22	–4	87.42	6
5	(Northern Ireland) Mickey Mansell	6	2	4	20	23	–3	90.45	4
6	(England) Ted Evetts	6	2	4	21	25	–4	86.48	4
7	(Germany) Martin Schindler	6	1	5	19	26	–7	90.97	2

101.15 Krzysztof Ratajski (Poland)	5 – 2	(Hong Kong) Kai Fan Leung 92.70
78.14 Mickey Mansell (Northern Ireland)	2 – 5	(Germany) Gabriel Clemens 80.04
83.43 Martin Schindler (Germany)	4 – 5	(England) Bradley Brooks 81.06
84.10 Ted Evetts (England)	4 – 5	(Poland) Krzysztof Ratajski 88.19
96.58 Kai Fan Leung (Hong Kong)	5 – 2	(Germany) Martin Schindler 99.28
95.78 Bradley Brooks (England)	5 – 3	(Northern Ireland) Mickey Mansell 90.49
92.34 Gabriel Clemens (Germany)	5 – 3	(England) Ted Evetts 89.20
101.06 Martin Schindler (Germany)	4 – 5	(Poland) Krzysztof Ratajski 100.01
109.24 Mickey Mansell (Northern Ireland)	5 – 1	(Hong Kong) Kai Fan Leung 99.00
83.26 Gabriel Clemens (Germany)	0 – 5	(England) Bradley Brooks 89.46
75.17 Ted Evetts (England)	1 – 5	(Germany) Martin Schindler 86.60
98.38 Krzysztof Ratajski (Poland)	5 – 4	(Northern Ireland) Mickey Mansell 94.60
92.57 Kai Fan Leung (Hong Kong)	5 – 3	(Germany) Gabriel Clemens 89.72
90.49 Bradley Brooks (England)	4 – 5	(England) Ted Evetts 93.51
91.24 Mickey Mansell (Northern Ireland)	5 – 2	(Germany) Martin Schindler 89.83
84.58 Gabriel Clemens (Germany)	0 – 5	(Poland) Krzysztof Ratajski 100.20
77.39 Bradley Brooks (England)	2 – 5	(Hong Kong) Kai Fan Leung 84.38
87.88 Ted Evetts (England)	5 – 1	(Northern Ireland) Mickey Mansell 79.00
85.64 Martin Schindler (Germany)	2 – 5	(Germany) Gabriel Clemens 94.57
93.26 Krzysztof Ratajski (Poland)	4 – 5	(England) Bradley Brooks 85.37
93.12 Kai Fan Leung (Hong Kong)	5 – 3	(England) Ted Evetts 89.04

=== Group 3 – 5 October ===
Pos.	Player	P	W	L	LF	LA	+/–	Avg	Pts
1	(England) Carl Wilkinson	6	5	1	29	16	+13	86.92	10
2	(England) Kirk Shepherd	6	4	2	24	20	+4	88.30	8
3	(England) James Wilson	6	4	2	25	21	+4	92.26	8
4	(Wales) Nick Kenny	6	3	3	23	25	–2	87.34	6
5	(Netherlands) Jeffrey de Zwaan	6	2	4	23	23	0	87.30	4
6	(England) Adam Hunt	6	2	4	21	23	–2	92.61	4
7	(Netherlands) Geert Nentjes	6	1	5	10	27	–17	84.86	2

90.54 Jeffrey de Zwaan (Netherlands)	5 – 0	(Netherlands) Geert Nentjes74.62
85.65 Carl Wilkinson (England)	5 – 2	(England) James Wilson 86.05
91.74 Kirk Shepherd (England)	5 – 2	(Wales) Nick Kenny 85.20
100.57 Adam Hunt (England)	3 – 5	(Netherlands) Jeffrey de Zwaan 89.12
83.85 Geert Nentjes (Netherlands)	1 – 5	(England) Kirk Shepherd 86.25
81.81 Nick Kenny (Wales)	5 – 4	(England) Carl Wilkinson 82.03
86.62 James Wilson (England)	5 – 2	(England) Adam Hunt 82.50
90.96 Kirk Shepherd (England)	5 – 4	(Netherlands) Jeffrey de Zwaan 93.18
93.39 Carl Wilkinson (England)	5 – 2	(Netherlands) Geert Nentjes92.16
92.66 James Wilson (England)	5 – 4	(Wales) Nick Kenny 92.40
98.01 Adam Hunt (England)	5 – 2	(England) Kirk Shepherd 82.41
82.77 Jeffrey de Zwaan (Netherlands)	1 – 5	(England) Carl Wilkinson 89.91
83.79 Geert Nentjes (Netherlands)	1 – 5	(England) James Wilson 96.67
93.44 Nick Kenny (Wales)	5 – 2	(England) Adam Hunt 91.83
82.78 Carl Wilkinson (England)	5 – 2	(England) Kirk Shepherd 78.28
93.34 James Wilson (England)	5 – 4	(Netherlands) Jeffrey de Zwaan 87.22
86.49 Nick Kenny (Wales)	2 – 5	(Netherlands) Geert Nentjes 90.55
89.19 Adam Hunt (England)	4 – 5	(England) Carl Wilkinson 87.74
100.17 Kirk Shepherd (England)	5 – 3	(England) James Wilson 98.19
80.46 Jeffrey de Zwaan (Netherlands)	4 – 5	(Wales) Nick Kenny 84.72
84.16 Geert Nentjes (Netherlands)	1 – 5	(England) Adam Hunt 93.57

=== Group 4 – 6 October ===
Pos.	Player	P	W	L	LF	LA	+/–	Avg	Pts
1	(England) Luke Humphries	6	5	1	29	14	+15	98.68	10
2	(England) Ross Smith	6	5	1	28	17	+11	95.70	10
3	(England) Joe Murnan	6	4	2	23	20	+3	87.19	8
4	(Australia) Damon Heta	6	3	3	24	21	+3	97.82	6
5	(England) Luke Woodhouse	6	3	3	23	21	+2	94.44	6
6	(Belgium) Mike De Decker	6	1	5	15	28	–13	91.02	2
7	(Wales) Barrie Bates	6	0	6	9	30	–21	82.47	0

97.69 Mike De Decker (Belgium)	5 – 3	(Wales) Barrie Bates85.01
83.26 Ross Smith (England)	3 – 5	(England) Joe Murnan 84.64
93.63 Luke Humphries (England)	5 – 2	(England) Luke Woodhouse 94.10
93.87 Damon Heta (Australia)	5 – 3	(Belgium) Mike De Decker 90.99
79.54 Barrie Bates (Wales)	0 – 5	(England) Luke Humphries 97.60
97.57 Luke Woodhouse (England)	2 – 5	(England) Ross Smith 101.28
81.80 Joe Murnan (England)	1 – 5	(Australia) Damon Heta 89.15
105.16 Luke Humphries (England)	5 – 2	(Belgium) Mike De Decker 96.79
101.47 Ross Smith (England)	5 – 2	(Wales) Barrie Bates91.06
95.53 Joe Murnan (England)	5 – 4	(England) Luke Woodhouse 96.09
97.26 Damon Heta (Australia)	3 – 5	(England) Luke Humphries 99.42
83.48 Mike De Decker (Belgium)	1 – 5	(England) Ross Smith 98.07
75.63 Barrie Bates (Wales)	1 – 5	(England) Joe Murnan 80.25
95.11 Luke Woodhouse (England)	5 – 3	(Australia) Damon Heta 103.73
98.18 Ross Smith (England)	5 – 4	(England) Luke Humphries 102.85
91.73 Joe Murnan (England)	5 – 2	(Belgium) Mike De Decker 90.47
89.22 Luke Woodhouse (England)	5 – 1	(Wales) Barrie Bates79.41
95.56 Damon Heta (Australia)	3 – 5	(England) Ross Smith 91.94
93.43 Luke Humphries (England)	5 – 2	(England) Joe Murnan 89.17
86.67 Mike De Decker (Belgium)	2 – 5	(England) Luke Woodhouse 94.53
84.19 Barrie Bates (Wales)	2 – 5	(Australia) Damon Heta 107.35

=== Group 5 – 7 October ===
Pos.	Player	P	W	L	LF	LA	+/–	Avg	Pts
1	(England) Andy Boulton	6	6	0	30	19	+11	95.06	12
2	(Netherlands) Ron Meulenkamp	6	4	2	25	16	+9	94.48	8
3	(England) Ryan Meikle	6	3	3	25	19	+6	90.46	6
4	(Finland) Marko Kantele	6	3	3	21	23	–2	87.77	6
5	(England) Alan Tabern	6	3	3	21	23	–2	89.57	6
6	(England) Matthew Edgar	6	2	4	20	25	–5	83.59	4
7	(England) Steve Brown	6	0	6	13	30	–17	81.49	0

103.99 Ron Meulenkamp (Netherlands)	5 – 1	(Finland) Marko Kantele 90.04
87.06 Alan Tabern (England)	5 – 4	(England) Ryan Meikle 85.34
93.89 Andy Boulton (England)	5 – 4	(England) Steve Brown 84.43
81.81 Matthew Edgar (England)	0 – 5	(Netherlands) Ron Meulenkamp 93.94
84.99 Marko Kantele (Finland)	3 – 5	(England) Andy Boulton 90.02
78.13 Steve Brown (England)	1 – 5	(England) Alan Tabern 90.48
78.77 Ryan Meikle (England)	2 – 5	(England) Matthew Edgar 80.40
94.10 Andy Boulton (England)	5 – 4	(Netherlands) Ron Meulenkamp 93.70
88.59 Alan Tabern (England)	2 – 5	(Finland) Marko Kantele 97.00
86.60 Ryan Meikle (England)	5 – 1	(England) Steve Brown77.09
85.25 Matthew Edgar (England)	3 – 5	(England) Andy Boulton 92.02
90.35 Ron Meulenkamp (Netherlands)	5 – 3	(England) Alan Tabern 91.29
83.17 Marko Kantele (Finland)	2 – 5	(England) Ryan Meikle 91.55
83.71 Steve Brown (England)	3 – 5	(England) Matthew Edgar 88.82
94.77 Alan Tabern (England)	1 – 5	(England) Andy Boulton 98.59
106.50 Ryan Meikle (England)	5 – 1	(Netherlands) Ron Meulenkamp 93.00
80.54 Steve Brown (England)	2 – 5	(Finland) Marko Kantele 88.50
85.49 Matthew Edgar (England)	3 – 5	(England) Alan Tabern 85.22
101.72 Andy Boulton (England)	5 – 4	(England) Ryan Meikle 93.98
91.89 Ron Meulenkamp (Netherlands)	5 – 2	(England) Steve Brown 85.06
82.91 Marko Kantele (Finland)	5 – 4	(England) Matthew Edgar 79.76

=== Ranking of fifth-placed players ===
Pos.	Group	Player	P	W	L	LF	LA	+/−	Avg	Pts	Qualification
1	4	(England) Luke Woodhouse	6	3	3	23	21	+2	94.44	6	Advance to Phase Three
2	5	(England) Alan Tabern	6	3	3	21	23	–2	87.77	6	Eliminated
3	1	(England) Alan Tabern	6	2	4	22	22	0	94.15	4	Eliminated
4	3	(Netherlands) Jeffrey de Zwaan	6	2	4	23	23	0	87.30	4	Eliminated
4	2	(Northern Ireland) Michael Mansell	6	2	4	20	23	–3	90.45	4	Eliminated

== Phase Three ==
All matches first to 5 (best-of-9 legs)

NB: P = Played; W = Won; L = Lost; LF = Legs for; LA = Legs against; +/− = Plus/minus record, in relation to legs; Avg = Three-dart average in group matches; Pts = Group points

=== Qualified players ===
Group Winners

- (England) Andy Boulton
- (England) Luke Humphries
- (Wales) Jonny Clayton
- (England) Carl Wilkinson
- (Poland) Krzysztof Ratajski

Group Runner-ups

- (England) Ross Smith
- (Netherlands) Jermaine Wattimena
- (Netherlands) Ron Meulenkamp
- (England) Bradley Brooks
- (England) Kirk Shepherd

Group Third

- (England) Chris Dobey
- (England) James Wilson
- (Hong Kong) Kai Fan Leung
- (England) Joe Murnan
- (England) Ryan Meikle

Group Fourth

- (Australia) Damon Heta
- (Belgium) Kim Huybrechts
- (Finland) Marko Kantele
- (Wales) Nick Kenny
- (Germany) Gabriel Clemens

Best Fifth

- (England) Luke Woodhouse

=== Group 1 – 12 October ===
Pos.	Player	P	W	L	LF	LA	+/–	Avg	Pts
1	(Australia) Damon Heta	6	5	1	27	15	+12	94.78	10
2	(Hong Kong) Kai Fan Leung	6	4	2	25	14	+11	94.90	8
3	(Netherlands) Ron Meulenkamp	6	4	2	23	18	+5	86.76	8
4	(England) James Wilson	6	3	3	21	21	0	88.15	6
5	(England) Carl Wilkinson	6	2	4	16	23	–7	83.86	4
6	(England) Andy Boulton	6	2	4	18	28	–10	90.02	4
7	(England) Luke Woodhouse	6	1	5	16	27	–11	89.42	2

89.32 Luke Woodhouse (England)	0 – 5	(Hong Kong) Kai Fan Leung 97.60
86.78 Ron Meulenkamp (Netherlands)	3 – 5	(England) James Wilson 94.19
89.38 Andy Boulton (England)	3 – 5	(England) Carl Wilkinson 84.81
97.29 Damon Heta (Australia)	5 – 4	(England) Luke Woodhouse 97.45
94.25 Kai Fan Leung (Hong Kong)	4 – 5	(England) Andy Boulton 94.28
78.58 Carl Wilkinson (England)	1 – 5	(Netherlands) Ron Meulenkamp 88.81
78.97 James Wilson (England)	1 – 5	(Australia) Damon Heta 92.84
92.80 Andy Boulton (England)	5 – 4	(England) Luke Woodhouse 94.26
81.50 Ron Meulenkamp (Netherlands)	0 – 5	(Hong Kong) Kai Fan Leung 100.20
85.75 James Wilson (England)	5 – 2	(England) Carl Wilkinson 83.12
89.92 Damon Heta (Australia)	5 – 2	(England) Andy Boulton 89.17
85.26 Luke Woodhouse (England)	3 – 5	(Netherlands) Ron Meulenkamp 88.32
97.93 Kai Fan Leung (Hong Kong)	5 – 3	(England) James Wilson 93.15
89.07 Carl Wilkinson (England)	2 – 5	(Australia) Damon Heta 94.81
78.40 Ron Meulenkamp (Netherlands)	5 – 2	(England) Andy Boulton 81.99
83.46 James Wilson (England)	2 – 5	(England) Luke Woodhouse 86.09
73.61 Carl Wilkinson (England)	1 – 5	(Hong Kong) Kai Fan Leung 88.99
95.85 Damon Heta (Australia)	2 – 5	(Netherlands) Ron Meulenkamp 96.76
92.51 Andy Boulton (England)	1 – 5	(England) James Wilson 93.38
84.15 Luke Woodhouse (England)	0 – 5	(England) Carl Wilkinson 93.94
90.43 Kai Fan Leung (Hong Kong)	1 – 5	(Australia) Damon Heta 97.97

=== Group 2 – 13 October ===
Pos.	Player	P	W	L	LF	LA	+/–	Avg	Pts
1	(Poland) Krzysztof Ratajski	6	5	1	29	15	+14	97.20	10
2	(England) Ross Smith	6	4	2	27	20	+7	90.76	8
3	(England) Chris Dobey	6	4	2	25	23	+2	93.22	8
4	(Wales) Nick Kenny	6	3	3	22	23	–1	90.16	6
5	(England) Joe Murnan	6	2	4	19	24	–5	87.47	4
6	(England) Ryan Meikle	6	2	4	21	28	–7	89.22	4
7	(Finland) Marko Kantele	6	1	5	17	27	–10	88.76	2

104.00 Krzysztof Ratajski (Poland)	5 – 1	(Finland) Marko Kantele 88.97
85.77 Joe Murnan (England)	2 – 5	(England) Ross Smith 89.66
85.81 Chris Dobey (England)	5 – 4	(England) Ryan Meikle 95.70
96.31 Nick Kenny (Wales)	1 – 5	(Poland) Krzysztof Ratajski 101.59
87.24 Marko Kantele (Finland)	3 – 5	(England) Chris Dobey 96.25
86.79 Ryan Meikle (England)	2 – 5	(England) Joe Murnan 89.20
92.84 Ross Smith (England)	4 – 5	(Wales) Nick Kenny 99.25
93.39 Chris Dobey (England)	1 – 5	(Poland) Krzysztof Ratajski 95.16
90.85 Joe Murnan (England)	5 – 2	(Finland) Marko Kantele 84.34
85.37 Ross Smith (England)	5 – 2	(England) Ryan Meikle 87.50
83.80 Nick Kenny (Wales)	4 – 5	(England) Chris Dobey 90.66
101.21 Krzysztof Ratajski (Poland)	5 – 4	(England) Joe Murnan 94.54
94.85 Marko Kantele (Finland)	2 – 5	(England) Ross Smith 96.87
90.30 Ryan Meikle (England)	3 – 5	(Wales) Nick Kenny 96.07
90.51 Joe Murnan (England)	2 – 5	(England) Chris Dobey 97.33
87.51 Ross Smith (England)	3 – 5	(Poland) Krzysztof Ratajski 91.21
89.65 Ryan Meikle (England)	5 – 4	(Finland) Marko Kantele84.24
82.02 Nick Kenny (Wales)	5 – 1	(England) Joe Murnan 73.95
95.86 Chris Dobey (England)	4 – 5	(England) Ross Smith 92.33
90.02 Krzysztof Ratajski (Poland)	4 – 5	(England) Ryan Meikle 85.37
92.92 Marko Kantele (Finland)	5 – 2	(Wales) Nick Kenny 83.49

=== Group 3 – 14 October ===
Pos.	Player	P	W	L	LF	LA	+/–	Avg	Pts
1	(Wales) Jonny Clayton	6	6	0	30	11	+19	99.19	12
2	(England) Luke Humphries	6	5	1	27	10	+17	98.33	10
3	(Belgium) Kim Huybrechts	6	3	3	20	20	0	88.81	6
4	(Germany) Gabriel Clemens	6	2	4	20	27	–7	87.51	4
5	(Netherlands) Jermaine Wattimena	6	2	4	16	24	–8	92.73	4
6	(England) Kirk Shepherd	6	2	4	16	26	–10	84.90	4
7	(England) Bradley Brooks	6	1	5	18	29	–11	90.29	2

86.49 Bradley Brooks (England)	3 – 5	(England) Kirk Shepherd 89.74
84.36 Gabriel Clemens (Germany)	5 – 4	(Belgium) Kim Huybrechts 87.90
89.94 Jermaine Wattimena (Netherlands)	2 – 5	(Wales) Jonny Clayton 98.74
95.30 Luke Humphries (England)	5 – 2	(England) Bradley Brooks 83.65
89.17 Kirk Shepherd (England)	2 – 5	(Netherlands) Jermaine Wattimena 97.49
92.60 Jonny Clayton (Wales)	5 – 2	(Germany) Gabriel Clemens 86.91
86.00 Kim Huybrechts (Belgium)	1 – 5	(England) Luke Humphries 102.83
96.73 Jermaine Wattimena (Netherlands)	5 – 2	(England) Bradley Brooks 95.84
87.44 Gabriel Clemens (Germany)	3 – 5	(England) Kirk Shepherd 84.84
86.19 Kim Huybrechts (Belgium)	0 – 5	(Wales) Jonny Clayton 90.54
108.91 Luke Humphries (England)	5 – 0	(Netherlands) Jermaine Wattimena 100.05
91.35 Bradley Brooks (England)	5 – 4	(Germany) Gabriel Clemens 85.63
83.23 Kirk Shepherd (England)	2 – 5	(Belgium) Kim Huybrechts 93.26
103.89 Jonny Clayton (Wales)	5 – 2	(England) Luke Humphries 95.16
96.00 Gabriel Clemens (Germany)	5 – 3	(Netherlands) Jermaine Wattimena 89.21
88.23 Kim Huybrechts (Belgium)	5 – 2	(England) Bradley Brooks 90.64
102.42 Jonny Clayton (Wales)	5 – 1	(England) Kirk Shepherd 78.71
94.11 Luke Humphries (England)	5 – 1	(Germany) Gabriel Clemens 84.73
82.95 Jermaine Wattimena (Netherlands)	1 – 5	(Belgium) Kim Huybrechts 91.29
93.74 Bradley Brooks (England)	4 – 5	(Wales) Jonny Clayton 106.96
83.70 Kirk Shepherd (England)	1 – 5	(England) Luke Humphries 93.64

=== Ranking of third-placed players ===
Pos.	Group	Player	P	W	L	LF	LA	+/−	Avg	Pts	Qualification
1	1	(Netherlands) Ron Meulenkamp	6	4	2	23	18	+5	86.76	8	Advance to Championship Group
2	2	(England) Chris Dobey	6	4	2	25	23	+2	93.22	8	Eliminated
3	3	(Belgium) Kim Huybrechts	6	3	3	20	20	0	88.81	6	Eliminated

== Championship Group (20 October) ==
All matches first to 5 (best-of-9 legs)

NB: P = Played; W = Won; L = Lost; LF = Legs for; LA = Legs against; +/− = Plus/minus record, in relation to legs; Avg = Three-dart average in group matches; Pts = Group points

=== Qualified players ===
Group Winners

- (Wales) Jonny Clayton
- (Poland) Krzysztof Ratajski
- (Australia) Damon Heta

Group Runner-ups

- (England) Luke Humphries
- (Hong Kong) Kai Fan Leung
- (England) Ross Smith

Best Third

- (Netherlands) Ron Meulenkamp

=== Standings ===
Pos.	Player	P	W	L	LF	LA	+/–	Avg	Pts
Winner	(England) Luke Humphries	6	5	1	28	18	+10	100.19	10
Runner-up	(Wales) Jonny Clayton	6	5	1	27	21	+6	95.80	10
3	(Australia) Damon Heta	6	3	3	25	22	+3	101.09	6
4	(Poland) Krzysztof Ratajski	6	3	3	23	24	–1	98.43	6
5	(Netherlands) Ron Meulenkamp	6	3	3	25	27	–2	91.35	6
6	(Hong Kong) Kai Fan Leung	6	1	5	21	29	–8	90.47	2
7	(England) Ross Smith	6	1	5	20	28	–8	95.53	2

101.20 Krzysztof Ratajski (Poland)	5 – 3	(Hong Kong) Kai Fan Leung 98.53
100.22 Ross Smith (England)	4 – 5	(England) Luke Humphries 101.48
102.73 Damon Heta (Australia)	5 – 2	(Wales) Jonny Clayton 99.55
90.93 Ron Meulenkamp (Netherlands)	5 – 4	(Poland) Krzysztof Ratajski 93.00
94.55 Kai Fan Leung (Hong Kong)	4 – 5	(Australia) Damon Heta 99.98
100.31 Jonny Clayton (Wales)	5 – 4	(England) Ross Smith 93.27
95.61 Luke Humphries (England)	5 – 4	(Netherlands) Ron Meulenkamp 87.90
92.74 Damon Heta (Australia)	4 – 5	(Poland) Krzysztof Ratajski 101.54
93.65 Ross Smith (England)	4 – 5	(Hong Kong) Kai Fan Leung 91.22
90.60 Luke Humphries (England)	3 – 5	(Wales) Jonny Clayton 93.00
88.82 Ron Meulenkamp (Netherlands)	5 – 4	(Australia) Damon Heta 92.37
98.34 Krzysztof Ratajski (Poland)	5 – 2	(England) Ross Smith 93.45
84.33 Kai Fan Leung (Hong Kong)	1 – 5	(England) Luke Humphries 98.90
98.87 Jonny Clayton (Wales)	5 – 3	(Netherlands) Ron Meulenkamp 93.59
98.40 Ross Smith (England)	1 – 5	(Australia) Damon Heta 118.96
108.31 Luke Humphries (England)	5 – 2	(Poland) Krzysztof Ratajski 97.53
82.67 Jonny Clayton (Wales)	5 – 4	(Hong Kong) Kai Fan Leung 84.70
96.97 Ron Meulenkamp (Netherlands)	3 – 5	(England) Ross Smith 94.21
99.77 Damon Heta (Australia)	2 – 5	(England) Luke Humphries 106.21
98.97 Krzysztof Ratajski (Poland)	2 – 5	(Wales) Jonny Clayton 100.41
89.50 Kai Fan Leung (Hong Kong)	4 – 5	(Netherlands) Ron Meulenkamp 89.91
