= Gary Blades =

English darts player

Personal information
- Nickname: "Razor"
- Born: 16 November 1980 (age 45) Lincoln, Lincolnshire, England

Sport
- Sport: Darts
- Darts: 22g Target
- Laterality: Right-handed

Organisation (see split in darts)
- PDC: 2005–2010, 2019–

PDC premier events – best performances
- UK Open: Last 96: 2021

Gary Blades (born 16 November 1980) is an English professional darts player who competes in Professional Darts Corporation (PDC) events.

== Career ==
Blades has played in the UK Open four times. He lost 4–3 in the 1st Round to Gary Flynn in 2005. In 2007, he beat Justin Henshaw 8–6 in the preliminary round, before losing 8–6 to Simon Craven in the 1st Round. In 2020, he lost 6–1 to Wayne Jones in the 1st round. In 2021 he beat Dom Taylor in Round 2 6–0, but then lost 6–3 to Andy Hamilton in the 3rd round.

After returning to the circuit in 2019 without a great deal of success, Blades entered Q-School on 16 January 2020 and won his Tour Card on the first day by beating Tony Newell 5–1 in the final round. He will play on the PDC ProTour in 2020 and 2021.

Gary had moderate success prior to the Covid lockdown, making the last 32 twice in the first 8 PDC Players Championship events, beating Darren Webster and Scott Waites among others. However he lost his tour card at the end of 2021.

Gary's best run to date in a PDC Players Championship came as a Challenge Tour top up in 2022, reaching the Quarter Final in Players Championship 7, beating Michael van Gerwen along the way. Gary also had a run to the last 32 later in the year, beating another World Champion Rob Cross in the 2nd Round.

== Performance timeline ==
=== PDC Players Championships ===
Season	1	2	3	4	5	6	7	8	9	10	11	12	13	14	15	16	17	18	19	20	21	22	23	24	25	26	27	28	29	30
2020	BAR; 2R	BAR; 1R	WIG; 1R	WIG; 2R	WIG; 1R	WIG; 3R	BAR; 1R	BAR; 3R	MIL; 1R	MIL; 1R	MIL; 2R	MIL; 2R	MIL; 1R	NIE; 1R	NIE; 1R	NIE; 1R	NIE; 2R	NIE; 1R	COV; 1R	COV; 1R	COV; 1R	COV; 2R	COV; 1R							
2021	BOL; 1R	BOL; 1R	BOL; 1R	BOL; 1R	MIL; 1R	MIL; 1R	MIL; 1R	MIL; 1R	NIE; 1R	NIE; 1R	NIE; 1R	NIE; 1R	MIL; 2R	MIL; 3R	MIL; 1R	MIL; 2R	COV; 1R	COV; 1R	COV; 1R	COV; 2R	BAR; 1R	BAR; 1R	BAR; 1R	BAR; 1R	BAR; 1R	BAR; 1R	BAR; 2R	BAR; 1R	BAR; 1R	BAR; 1R
2022	Did not participate						NIE; QF	NIE; 1R	Did not participate							NIE; 3R	NIE; 1R	Did not participate												
