= Krzysztof Kciuk =

Polish darts player

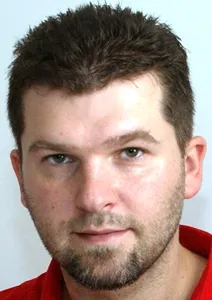

Personal information
- Nickname: "The Thumb"
- Born: 11 June 1980 (age 46) Katowice, Poland
- Home town: Kraków, Poland

Sport
- Sport: Darts
- Playing since: 2000
- Darts: 18g Unicorn
- Laterality: Right-handed
- Walk-on music: "Legendary" by Welshly Arms

Organisation (see split in darts)
- BDO: 2010–2019
- PDC: 2009–2010, 2019–present (Tour Card: 2020–2023)
- WDF: 2010–2019
- Current world ranking: (PDC) 155 ▲15 (18 October 2026)

WDF major events – best performances
- World Championship: Last 16: 2019
- World Masters: Last 32: 2018, 2025

PDC premier events – best performances
- World Championship: Last 72: 2010
- UK Open: Last 64: 2022

Other tournament wins
- Years
Polish Championship	2018
Medal record
Men's Darts
Representing Poland
IDF World Championship
Silver medal – second place	2011 Benidorm	Men's singles
EDU European Championship
Bronze medal – third place	2006 Umag	Men's singles

Krzysztof Kciuk (born 11 June 1980) is a Polish professional darts player and technology specialist. He competes in Professional Darts Corporation (PDC) events. He is a Polish Champion and the first player from Poland to play at the PDC World Darts Championship. Together with Krzysztof Ratajski, he is the world record holder in pairs match average.

== Career ==
Krzysztof Kciuk is a Polish darts player who has represented Poland in various international tournaments. He won the national qualification for the 2010 PDC World Darts Championship in 2009 and played in the first PDC World Cup of Darts in history with Krzysztof Ratajski in the same year. Kciuk reached the quarter-finals at the Polish Open in 2017 and almost qualified for the 2018 PDC World Darts Championship, but lost in the final of the Eastern Europe Qualifier. He won the Polish Championship in 2018 and played in the 2019 BDO World Darts Championship. Kciuk won a two-year PDC Tour Card in 2020 and has since played in several tournaments, including the PDC World Cup of Darts with Ratajski in 2020 and 2021. At the 2021 UK Open, he won his first match but was eliminated in the second round.

Kciuk lost his PDC Pro Tour card at the end of 2021 after not achieving good results but regained it for the next two years by winning the last PDC European Q-School tournament in January 2022. He played in the 2022 International Darts Open in February and reached the second round, where he lost to Jonny Clayton. At the 2022 UK Open, he made it to the fourth round before losing to Ron Meulenkamp. In May 2022, Kciuk won his opening game against Keane Barry at the 2022 European Darts Open but lost in the second round to Ryan Searle. He qualified for the 2022 Gibraltar Darts Trophy but withdrew for unknown reasons.

Based on his performance throughout the 2023 season, especially at the PDC Players Championship tournaments, Kciuk received a qualifier for the 2023 PDC World Cup of Darts and for the fifth-time he represented Poland together with Krzysztof Ratajski. On the first day of the tournament, the Poles defeated the Portuguese team (Jose de Sousa and Luis Ameixa) by 4–3 in legs. In the second match of the group stage, the Poles faced the Lithuanian national team (Darius Labanauskas and Mindaugas Barauskas). The Poles defeated their rivals by 4–1 in legs, achieving the world record match average (118.10) of doubles matches.

== Personal life ==
Kciuk is married to Justyna and is a Front-end Developer.

== World Championship results ==
=== PDC ===
- 2010: Preliminary round (lost to Haruki Muramatsu 1–4) (legs)
- 2024: First round (lost to Connor Scutt 0–3) (sets)
- 2026: First round (lost to William O'Connor 0–3) (sets)

=== BDO ===
- 2019: Second round (lost to Scott Mitchell 0-4) (sets)

== Performance timeline ==
Kciuk's performance timeline is as follows:

=== BDO ===
Tournament	2017	2018	2019
BDO Ranked televised events
World Championship	DNQ		2R
World Masters	3R	5R	2R

=== WDF ===
Tournament	2024	2025
WDF Ranked televised events
World Masters	2R	4R

=== PDC ===
Tournament	2010	2013	2020	2021	2022	2023	2024	2026
PDC Ranked televised events
World Championship	Prel.	Did not qualify					1R	1R
UK Open	DNQ		1R	3R	4R	2R	DNQ	
PDC Non-ranked televised events
World Cup	1R	2R	2R	2R	DNQ	2R	DNQ	
Career statistics
Year-end ranking (PDC)	NR		140	101	110	86	211	

==== Players Championships ====
Season	1	2	3	4	5	6	7	8	9	10	11	12	13	14	15	16	17	18	19	20	21	22	23	24	25	26	27	28	29	30
2020	BAR; 1R	BAR; 1R	WIG; 1R	WIG; 1R	WIG; 1R	WIG; 1R	BAR; 1R	BAR; DNP	MIL; 2R	MIL; 1R	MIL; 2R	MIL; 1R	MIL; 2R	NIE; 1R	NIE; 1R	NIE; 1R	NIE; 1R	NIE; 1R	COV; 2R	COV; 4R	COV; QF	COV; 4R	COV; 1R							
2021	BOL; 1R	BOL; 3R	BOL; 1R	BOL; 2R	MIL; 1R	MIL; 1R	MIL; 1R	MIL; 1R	NIE; SF	NIE; 1R	NIE; 1R	NIE; 4R	MIL; 1R	MIL; 2R	MIL; 3R	MIL; 2R	COV; 3R	COV; 1R	COV; 2R	COV; 2R	BAR; 1R	BAR; 1R	BAR; 1R	BAR; 2R	BAR; 1R	BAR; 2R	BAR; 1R	BAR; 1R	BAR; 1R	BAR; 1R
2022	BAR; 1R	BAR; 2R	WIG; 1R	WIG; 2R	BAR; 1R	BAR; 2R	NIE; 1R	NIE; 1R	BAR; 2R	BAR; 1R	BAR; 1R	BAR; 2R	BAR; 1R	WIG; 3R	WIG; 1R	NIE; DNP		BAR; 1R	BAR; 1R	BAR; QF	BAR; 1R	BAR; 1R	BAR; 3R	BAR; 4R	BAR; Did not participate					
2023	BAR; 1R	BAR; 3R	BAR; 2R	BAR; QF	BAR; 1R	BAR; 2R	HIL; 1R	HIL; 4R	WIG; 3R	WIG; 1R	LEI; 2R	LEI; 2R	HIL; 1R	HIL; 2R	LEI; 1R	LEI; 1R	HIL; 1R	HIL; 1R	BAR; 2R	BAR; 1R	BAR; 1R	BAR; 1R	BAR; 1R	BAR; 2R	BAR; DNP				BAR; 1R	BAR; 2R
