= Kai Fan Leung =

Hong Kong darts player

Kai Fan Leung (梁啟勳)
Personal information
- Nickname: "FB"
- Born: 11 September 1983 (age 43) Hong Kong

Sport
- Sport: Darts
- Playing since: 2014
- Darts: 22g One80
- Laterality: Left-handed
- Walk-on music: "Hong Kong Phooey" by Scatman Crothers

Organisation (see split in darts)
- PDC: 2016– (Tour Card: 2020–2021)
- WDF: 2022–
- Current world ranking: (WDF) NR (17 August 2026)

WDF major events – best performances
- World Championship: Last 32: 2023, 2024
- World Masters: Semi Final 2022
- Dutch Open: Last 128: 2023

PDC premier events – best performances
- World Championship: Last 72: 2018
- UK Open: Last 64: 2021

Other tournament wins
- Years
Swedish Open	2022
Hong Kong Open	2018, 2019
Medal record
Men's Darts
Representing Hong Kong
WDF Asia-Pacific Cup
Silver medal – second place	2016 Osaka	Team event
Bronze medal – third place	2016 Osaka	Men's pairs

Kai Fan Leung (also known as Kevin Leung Kai-fan; born 11 September 1983) is a Hong Kong professional darts player who competes in Professional Darts Corporation (PDC) and World Darts Federation (WDF) events.

== Career ==
He started to play darts in 2014, entered competitions and become one of Hong Kong's top players. At the end of 2015, he quit his job to take up darts full-time.

In 2017, he qualified for the UK Open, losing in the first round. He then represented Hong Kong in the World Cup of Darts alongside Royden Lam, but they lost out in the first round to the Russian pairing of Boris Koltsov and Aleksandr Oreshkin. Leung won the 2017 North & East Asia Qualifier for the 2018 PDC World Darts Championship, where he lost 2–0 to Paul Lim in the preliminary round.

Leung won a two-year PDC Tour Card on 17 January 2020, beating Lisa Ashton 5–4 in the play-off match at UK Q-School. He became the second Hong Kong player to qualify for the Professional Darts Corporation (PDC) ProTour.

In 2022, Leung was runner up at the 2022 Isle of Man Masters, losing to Ryan Hogarth of Scotland 4–5 in the Final. He won the title at the WDF Swedish Open 2022, when he triumphed in the final with 5–1 against Alexander Merkx.

In the 2023 WDF World Darts Championship, Leung made his debut at the Lakeside. He competed in the second round against Swiss player Thomas Junghans. Leung started by winning the first set 3–2, capitalizing on Junghans’ missed doubles. However, Junghans improved his finishing in subsequent sets, ultimately defeating Leung 3–1.

In 2024 Leung continued playing mainly in WDF events and made his semi-final appearances at events like the Bruges Open and Belfry Open in 2024, and took victory at the Irish Classic. Leung competed again in the 2024 WDF World Darts Championship at the Lakeside and started in the Second round as a seeded player against Paul Lim. Despite a strong performance with an average score of 87.44, Leung was defeated by Lim in a five-set match, ending 3–2 in favor of Lim.

== Personal life ==
Leung was a stockbroker before starting to play darts and was also passionate for long-distance running.

== World Championship results ==
=== PDC World Championship ===
- 2018: Preliminary round (lost to Paul Lim 2–0) (sets)

=== WDF World Championship ===
- 2023: Second round (lost to Thomas Junghans 1–3)
- 2024: Second round (lost to Paul Lim 2–3)

== Performance timeline ==
=== WDF ===
Tournament	2022	2023	2024
WDF Ranked televised events
World Championship	DNQ	2R	2R
World Masters	SF	NH	DNQ
Dutch Open	DNP	6R	DNP

=== PDC ===
Tournament	2017	2018	2019	2020	2021	2022
PDC Ranked televised events
World Championship	DNQ	PR	DNQ			
UK Open	1R	DNQ		3R	4R	1R
PDC Non-major televised events
World Cup	1R	DNQ	1R	1R	1R	DNQ
Career statistics
PDC Year-end ranking	177	-	-	119	98	-

==== European Tour ====
Tournament	2020
Belgian Championship	1R
International Open	1R

==== Players Championships ====
Season	1	2	3	4	5	6	7	8	9	10	11	12	13	14	15	16	17	18	19	20	21	22	23	24	25	26	27	28	29	30
2020	BAR; 1R	BAR; 2R	WIG; 1R	WIG; 1R	WIG; 3R	WIG; 2R	BAR; 4R	BAR; 2R	MIL; 1R	MIL; 2R	MIL; 2R	MIL; 4R	MIL; 1R	NIE; 1R	NIE; 1R	NIE; 2R	NIE; 1R	NIE; 1R	COV; 1R	COV; 2R	COV; 1R	COV; 2R	COV; 1R							
2021	BOL; 1R	BOL; 1R	BOL; 2R	BOL; 2R	MIL; 1R	MIL; 2R	MIL; 1R	MIL; 4R	NIE; 1R	NIE; 3R	NIE; 1R	NIE; 2R	MIL; 1R	MIL; 1R	MIL; 2R	MIL; 1R	COV; DNP	COV; DNP	COV; DNP	COV; DNP	BAR; 2R	BAR; 2R	BAR; 1R	BAR; 2R	BAR; 1R	BAR; 1R	BAR; 2R	BAR; 2R	BAR; 1R	BAR; 1R
