= Conan Whitehead =

English darts player (born 1986)

Personal information
- Nickname: "The Barbarian"
- Born: 18 February 1986 (age 40) Dartford, Kent, England
- Home town: Gillingham, Kent, England

Sport
- Sport: Darts
- Playing since: 2007
- Darts: 23g One80
- Laterality: Right-handed
- Walk-on music: "Lets Get Ready to Rumble!" by Jock Jams

Organisation (see split in darts)
- BDO: 2007–2011, 2016–2019
- PDC: 2011–2015, 2019–

WDF major events – best performances
- World Championship: Quarter-final: 2019
- World Masters: Last 72: 2009
- World Trophy: Quarter-final: 2017
- Finder Masters: Quarter-final: 2018

PDC premier events – best performances
- UK Open: Last 64: 2013

Other tournament wins
- Years
Kent Open	2009
PDC Challenge Tour	2023
MODUS Super Series 1	2023

Conan Whitehead (born 18 February 1986) is an English professional darts player who competes in Professional Darts Corporation (PDC) events. He is a former quarter-finalist of the BDO World Darts Championship.

== Career ==
Whitehead has competed in numerous competitions throughout his career, starting in 2008. In 2009, he won the 2009 Kent Open, beating Steve Douglas in the final. Since then, he has only been in one other final. This was in the 2016 England Open where he lost 3–6 to Glen Durrant. He reached the quarter-final of the 2017 BDO World Trophy, his best TV major performance to date. This was equalled at his third appearance at the BDO World Darts Championship (in 2019) where he knocked out top-seed Mark McGeeney before losing to Scott Waites in the quarter-finals.

=== PDC ===
In January 2019, Whitehead entered PDC UK Q-School and did enough to earn a two-year tour card by finishing in the top 11 of the Order of Merit.

== World Championship results ==
=== BDO ===
- 2017: First round (lost to Darius Labanauskas 1–3)
- 2018: Second round (lost to Jim Williams 3–4)
- 2019: Quarter-final (lost to Scott Waites 3–5)

== Performance timeline ==
=== BDO ===
Tournament	2009	2016	2017	2018
BDO World Championship	DNQ		1R	2R
BDO World Trophy	NH	DNQ	QF	1R
World Masters	L72	L272	L272	L144
Zuiderduin Masters	DNP	RR	RR	QF

=== PDC ===
Tournament	2011	2013	2014	2024
UK Open	2R	3R	1R	1R

=== PDC Players Championships ===
Season	1	2	3	4	5	6	7	8	9	10	11	12	13	14	15	16	17	18	19	20	21	22	23	24	25	26	27	28	29	30
2014	BAR; 1R	BAR; 2R	CRA; 3R	CRA; 1R	WIG; 1R	WIG; 1R	WIG; 1R	WIG; 1R	CRA; DNP		COV; 2R	COV; 1R	CRA; 1R	CRA; 1R	DUB; 1R	DUB; 1R	CRA; 1R	CRA; 2R	COV; 2R	COV; 3R										
2015	BAR; 2R	BAR; 1R	BAR; 1R	BAR; 1R	BAR; 1R	COV; 1R	COV; 2R	COV; 1R	CRA; 1R	CRA; 1R	Did not participate																			
2019	WIG; 1R	WIG; 2R	WIG; 1R	WIG; 1R	BAR; 1R	BAR; 3R	WIG; 2R	WIG; 3R	BAR; 1R	BAR; 1R	BAR; 1R	BAR; 3R	BAR; 2R	BAR; 1R	BAR; 1R	BAR; 1R	WIG; 1R	WIG; 4R	BAR; 1R	BAR; 2R	HIL; 4R	HIL; 3R	BAR; 1R	BAR; 1R	BAR; 3R	BAR; 2R	DUB; 1R	DUB; 4R	BAR; 1R	BAR; 1R
2020	BAR; 4R	BAR; 2R	WIG; 2R	WIG; 3R	WIG; 2R	WIG; 1R	BAR; 2R	BAR; 1R	MIL; 1R	MIL; 1R	MIL; 1R	MIL; 1R	MIL; 1R	NIE; 1R	NIE; 2R	NIE; 2R	NIE; 2R	NIE; 1R	COV; QF	COV; 1R	COV; 1R	COV; 1R	COV; 2R							
2023	Did not participate										LEI; 1R	LEI; 2R	HIL; 2R	HIL; 1R	LEI; 2R	LEI; 1R	Did not participate													

Key

Performance Table Legend
W	Won the tournament	F	Finalist	SF	Semifinalist	QF	Quarterfinalist	#R; RR; L#	Lost in # round Round-robin; Last # stage	DQ	Disqualified
DNQ	Did not qualify	DNP	Did not participate	WD	Withdrew	NH	Tournament not held	#R; RR; L#	Lost in # round Round-robin; Last # stage	NYF	Not yet founded
