= Harald Leitinger =

Austrian darts player

Personal information
- Nickname: Harry
- Born: 15 September 1984 (age 42) Kirchdorf in Tirol, Austria
- Home town: Bad Hall, Austria

Sport
- Sport: Darts
- Playing since: 1997
- Darts: 16 Gram
- Laterality: Right-handed
- Walk-on music: "Hulapalu" by Andreas Gabalier

Organisation (see split in darts)
- PDC: 2012–

PDC premier events – best performances
- UK Open: Last 128: 2020

Harald "Harry" Leitinger (born 15 September 1984) is an Austrian professional darts player who competes in events of the Professional Darts Corporation (PDC).

== Career ==
Leitinger entered PDC Q-School in January 2020 and won his tour card on the first day by beating Martijn Kleermaker 5–4 in the final round. He played on the PDC ProTour in 2020 and 2021.

== Performance timeline ==
=== PDC Players Championships ===
Season	1	2	3	4	5	6	7	8	9	10	11	12	13	14	15	16	17	18	19	20	21	22	23	24	25	26	27	28	29	30
2020	BAR; 1R	BAR; 1R	WIG; 2R	WIG; 2R	WIG; 2R	WIG; 1R	BAR; DNP		MIL; 1R	MIL; 1R	MIL; 2R	MIL; 2R	MIL; 1R	NIE; 1R	NIE; 1R	NIE; 1R	NIE; 1R	NIE; 2R	COV; 1R	COV; 1R	COV; 1R	COV; 2R	COV; 1R							
2021	BOL; 1R	BOL; 1R	BOL; 2R	BOL; 1R	MIL; DNP				NIE; 1R	NIE; 1R	NIE; 1R	NIE; 1R	MIL; DNP				COV; 1R	COV; 1R	COV; 1R	COV; 1R	BAR; 1R	BAR; 2R	BAR; 2R	BAR; 1R	BAR; 1R	BAR; 1R	BAR; 1R	BAR; DNP		
