= 2021 PDC World Darts Championship =

28th edition of the PDC's World Championship event

2020/21 William Hill World Darts Championship

Tournament information
- Dates: 15 December 2020 – 3 January 2021
- Venue: Alexandra Palace
- Location: London, England
- Organisation(s): Professional Darts Corporation (PDC)
- Format: Sets; Final – first to 7 sets
- Prize fund: £2,500,000
- Winner's share: £500,000
- Nine-dart finish: James Wade
- High checkout: 170; Dirk van Duijvenbode (x2); Gary Anderson; Danny Baggish; Stephen Bunting; Dave Chisnall; Gerwyn Price

Champion(s)
- Gerwyn Price (WAL)

The 2021 PDC World Darts Championship (known for sponsorship reasons as the 2020/21 William Hill World Darts Championship) was the twenty-eighth World Championship organised by the Professional Darts Corporation since it separated from the British Darts Organisation. The collapse of the BDO in September 2020 and subsequent postponement of the World Darts Federation-sanctioned event meant that this edition was the first undisputed World Championship in the sport since John Lowe won the BDO World Darts Championship in 1993. The event took place at the Alexandra Palace in London from 15 December 2020 to 3 January 2021, and was played behind closed doors, except for the first day of the tournament, due to the COVID-19 pandemic.

Peter Wright was the defending champion, after defeating Michael van Gerwen 7–3 in the 2020 final. However, he was surprisingly eliminated by Gabriel Clemens in the third round.

Gerwyn Price won the World Championship for the first time in his career, beating Gary Anderson 7–3 in the final. As a result of winning the title, Gerwyn took over from Michael van Gerwen as world number 1.

Steve Beaton played in a record 30th consecutive World Championship (including the BDO version), breaking the record he jointly held with Phil Taylor, but lost in the first round to Diogo Portela.

James Wade hit his first World Championship nine-dart finish and the first PDC World Championship nine-darter since 2016 in his third round defeat to Stephen Bunting.

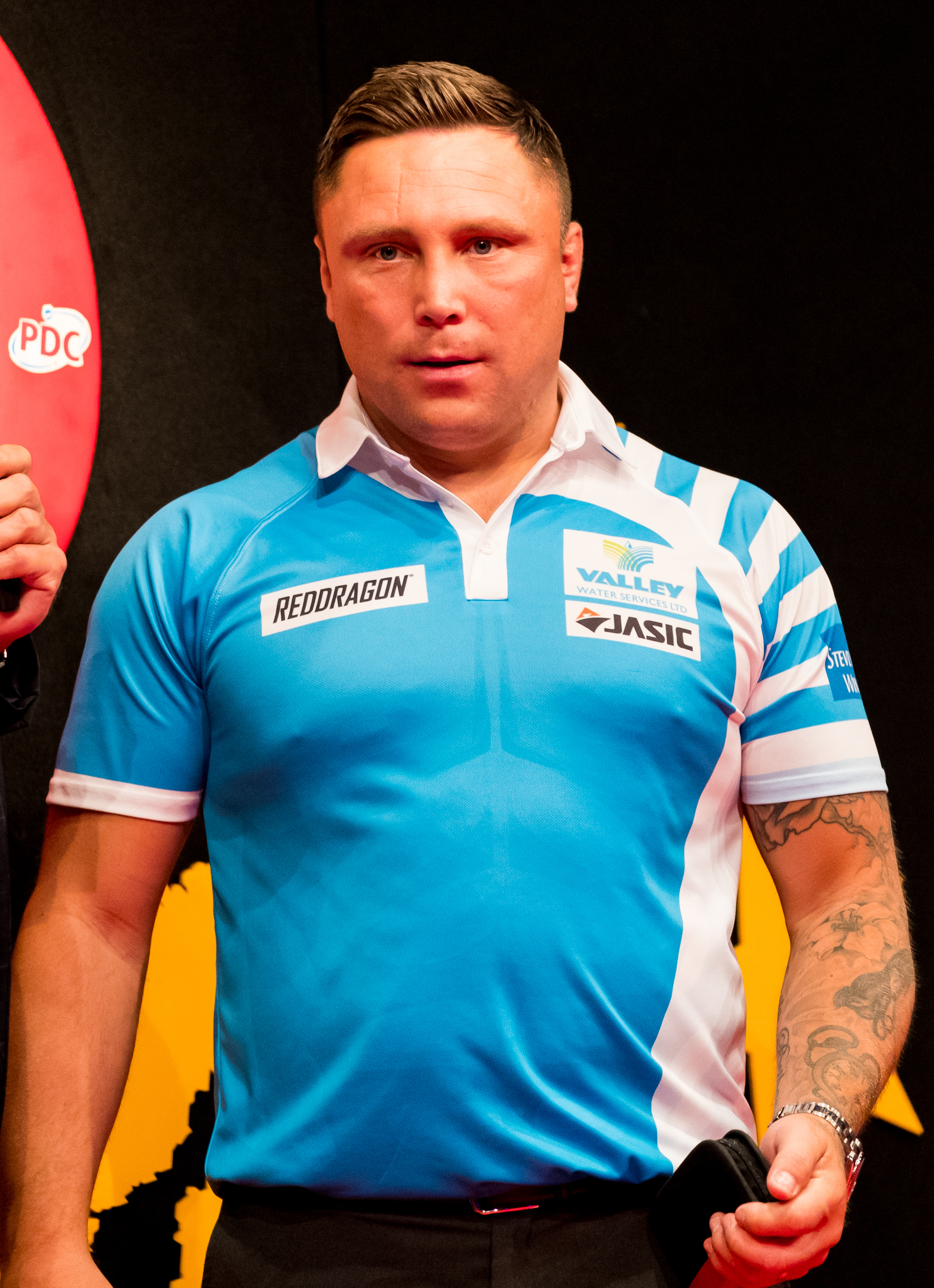
Third seed Gerwyn Price won the first PDC World Championship of his career. He was the first Welsh player to win the PDC World Championship.

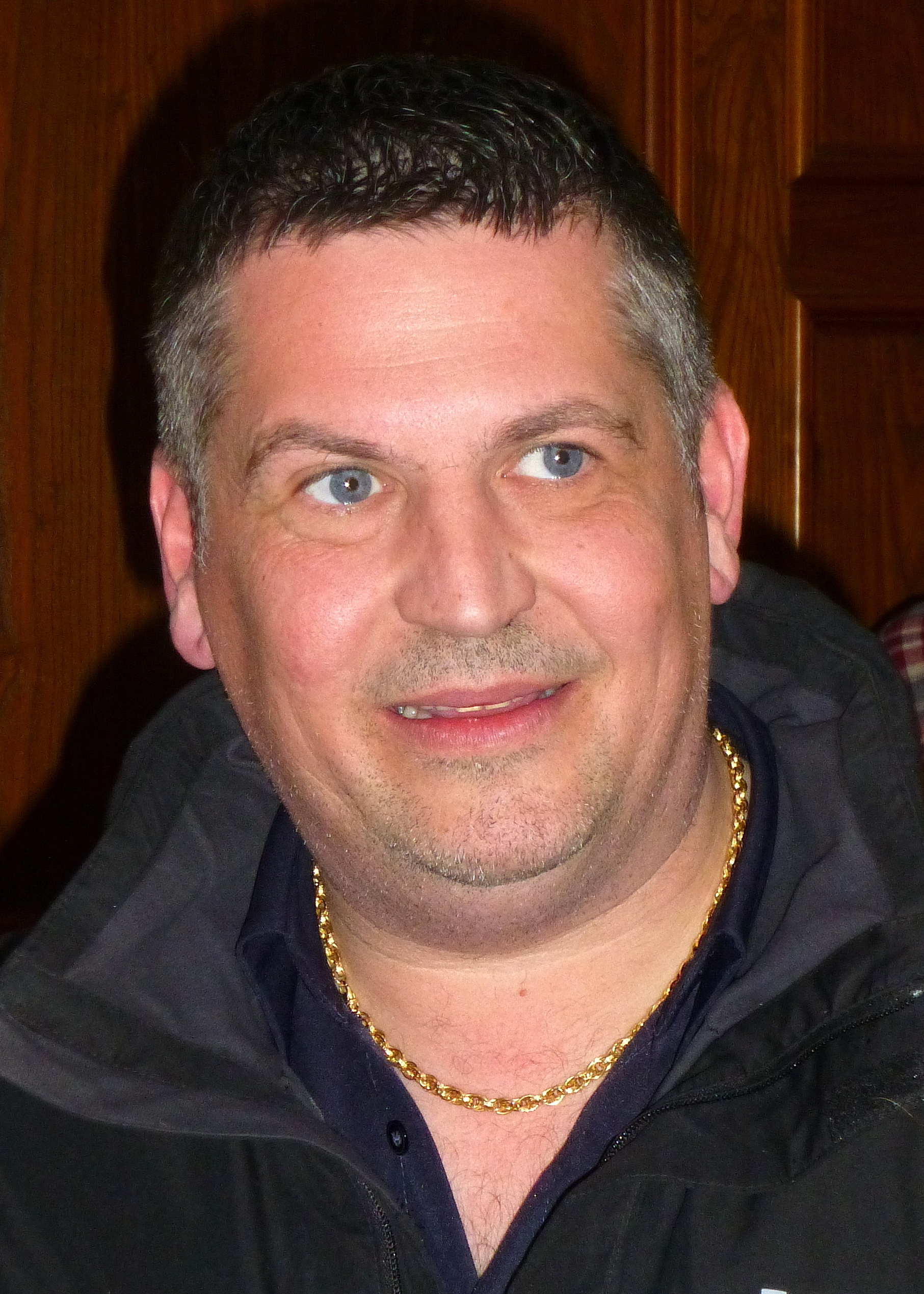
Two time champion Gary Anderson, the thirteenth seed, finished as runner up for the third time in his career.

== Format ==
All matches were played as single in, double out; requiring the players to score 501 points to win a leg, finishing on either a double or the bullseye. Matches were played to set format, with each set being the best of five legs (first to three). A rule which has been in place for previous tournaments, where the final set had to be won by two clear legs, was removed in order to prevent sessions overrunning.

The matches got longer as the tournament progresses:

- First round: Best of five sets
- Second round: Best of five sets
- Third round: Best of seven sets
- Fourth round: Best of seven sets
- Quarter-finals: Best of nine sets
- Semi-finals: Best of eleven sets
- Final: Best of thirteen sets

== Prize money ==
The prize money for the tournament was £2,500,000 in total – the same as in the previous year. The winner's share was £500,000.

Position (num. of players)		Prize money (Total: £2,500,000)
Winner	(1)	£500,000
Runner-up	(1)	£200,000
Semi-finalists	(2)	£100,000
Quarter-finalists	(4)	£50,000
Fourth round losers	(8)	£35,000
Third round losers	(16)	£25,000
Second round losers	(32)	£15,000
First round losers	(32)	£7,500

== Qualification ==
=== Qualifiers ===
The top 32 from the PDC Order of Merit began the competition in the second round. The 32 highest ranked players on the PDC Pro Tour Order of Merit (not already qualified) and 32 qualifiers from around the world began in the first round.

Order of Merit
Second round (seeded)

1. Michael van Gerwen (quarter-finals)
2. Peter Wright (third round)
3. Gerwyn Price (champion)
4. Michael Smith (second round)
5. Rob Cross (second round)
6. Nathan Aspinall (third round)
7. James Wade (third round)
8. Dave Chisnall (semi-finals)
9. Dimitri Van den Bergh (fourth round)
10. Ian White (second round)
11. Daryl Gurney (quarter-finals)
12. Glen Durrant (fourth round)
13. Gary Anderson (runner-up)
14. José de Sousa (third round)
15. Krzysztof Ratajski (quarter-finals)
16. Joe Cullen (fourth round)
17. Jonny Clayton (third round)
18. Simon Whitlock (third round)
19. Mervyn King (fourth round)
20. Mensur Suljović (third round)
21. Adrian Lewis (second round)
22. Chris Dobey (third round)
23. Jeffrey de Zwaan (second round)
24. Jermaine Wattimena (third round)
25. Danny Noppert (third round)
26. Stephen Bunting (semi-finals)
27. Vincent van der Voort (fourth round)
28. Jamie Hughes (second round)
29. Devon Petersen (fourth round)
30. Brendan Dolan (third round)
31. Gabriel Clemens (fourth round)
32. Ricky Evans (third round)

Pro Tour Order of Merit
First Round

1. Damon Heta (first round)
2. Ryan Searle (fourth round)
3. Dirk van Duijvenbode (quarter-finals)
4. Ross Smith (second round)
5. Madars Razma (second round)
6. Ryan Joyce (second round)
7. Martijn Kleermaker (First round – withdrew)
8. Kim Huybrechts (third round)
9. Jeff Smith (second round)
10. William O'Connor (second round)
11. Steve Lennon (second round)
12. Jason Lowe (third round)
13. Maik Kuivenhoven (first round)
14. Derk Telnekes (first round)
15. Darius Labanauskas (second round)
16. Mickey Mansell (second round)
17. Adam Hunt (third round)
18. Max Hopp (second round)
19. Scott Waites (second round)
20. Andy Boulton (second round)
21. Ryan Murray (second round)
22. Keegan Brown (second round)
23. Steve Beaton (first round)
24. Luke Woodhouse (first round)
25. Luke Humphries (first round)
26. Callan Rydz (second round)
27. Mike De Decker (first round)
28. Ron Meulenkamp (second round)
29. Steve West (second round)
30. Wayne Jones (second round)
31. Andy Hamilton (first round)
32. John Henderson (second round)

International Qualifiers
First Round

- Lisa Ashton – PDC Women's Series (first round)
- Danny Baggish – CDC USA Series (third round)
- James Bailey – DPA Pro Tour (first round)
- Keane Barry – PDC Development Tour (first round)
- Bradley Brooks – World Youth Champion (first round)
- Matt Campbell – CDC Canadian Series (first round)
- Cameron Carolissen – African Qualifier (second round)
- Matthew Edgar – UK Tour Card Holders' Qualifier (second round)
- David Evans – PDC Challenge Tour (first round)
- Edward Foulkes – PDJ Japanese Championship (second round)
- Amit Gilitwala – Indian Darts Federation (first round)
- Dmitriy Gorbunov - EADC Qualifier (first round)
- Deta Hedman – PDC Women's Series (first round)
- Lourence Ilagan – PDC Asia Philippines Qualifier (first round)
- Marko Kantele – PDC Nordic & Baltic (first round) (Note: Kim Viljanen, who had qualified as PDC Nordic and Baltic #1, withdrew from the field for health reasons. Marko Kantele, the next highest ranked on the PDC Nordic & Baltic Order of Merit after Darius Labanauskas (already qualified), replaced him in the field.)
- Nick Kenny – UK Tour Card Holders' Qualifier (second round)
- Boris Krčmar – Eastern European Qualifier (first round)
- Nico Kurz – Superleague Germany (second round)
- Daniel Larsson – PDC Nordic & Baltic (first round)
- Danny Lauby – CDC Continental Cup (first round)
- Jamie Lewis – UK Tour Card Holders' Qualifier (second round)
- Paul Lim – PDC Asia Hong Kong Qualifier (second round)
- Chengan Liu – PDC China Qualifier (first round)
- Gordon Mathers – DPA Pro Tour (first round)
- Ryan Meikle – PDC Development Tour (first round)
- Diogo Portela – South American Representative (second round)
- Haupai Puha – DPNZ Order of Merit (first round)
- Karel Sedláček – Rest of World Tour Card Holder's Qualifier (first round)
- Toru Suzuki – PDC Asia Japan Qualifier (first round)
- Ciarán Teehan – UK Tour Card Holders' Qualifier (first round)
- Di Zhuang – PDC Asia China Qualifier (first round)
- Niels Zonneveld – Rest of World Tour Card Holder's Qualifier (first round)

=== Background ===
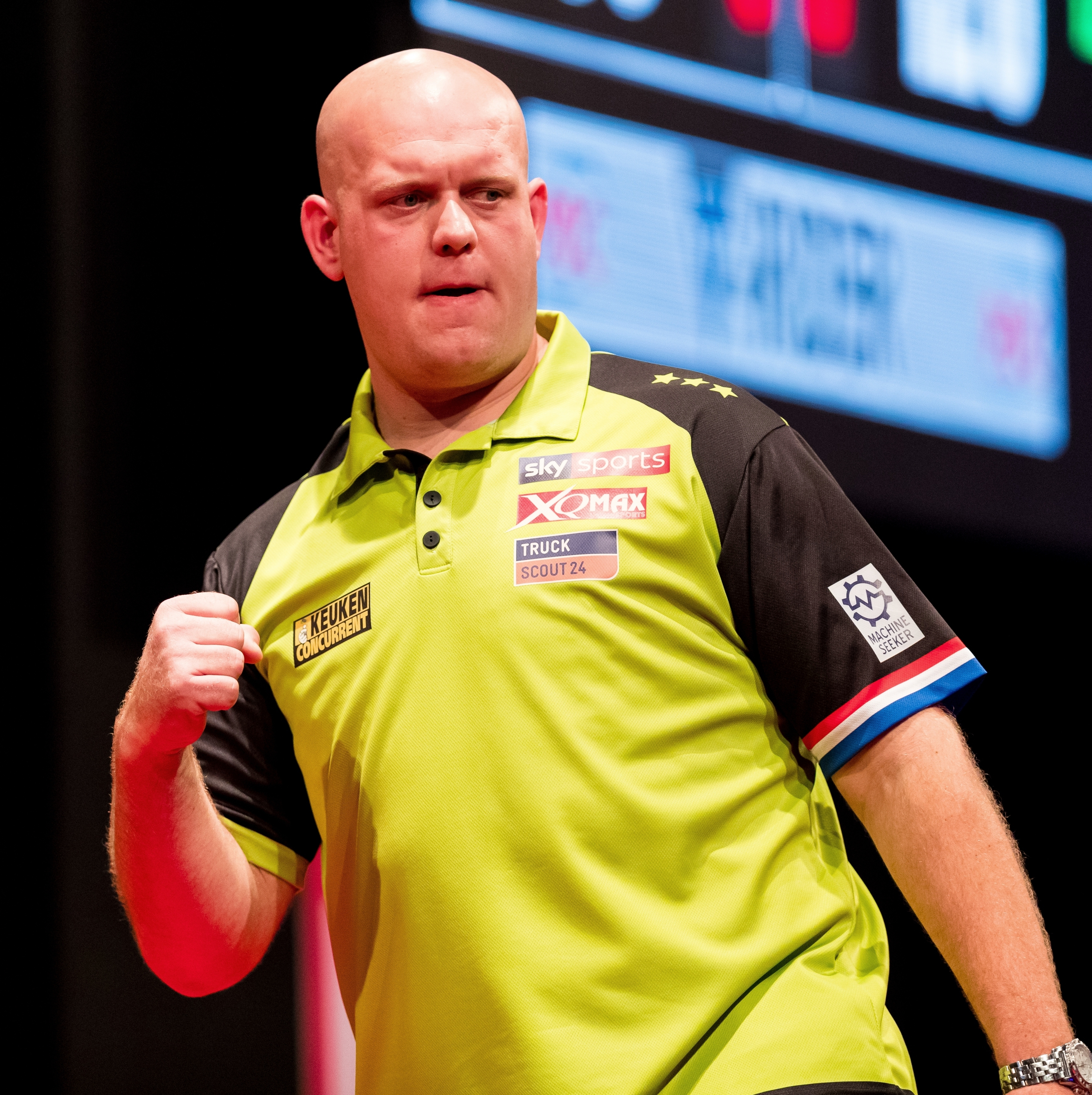
Three-time champion Michael van Gerwen was the top seed at the 2021 tournament. He was eliminated in the quarter-final.

=== Seeds ===
Michael van Gerwen, the runner-up at the previous World Championship and winner of the 2014, 2017 and 2019 PDC World Championships, was top of the two-year PDC Order of Merit and number one seed going into the tournament, having won the 2020 UK Open and Players Championship Finals. The reigning PDC World Champion Peter Wright and 2020 European Champion was the second seed. Eventual champion and 2020 World Grand Prix champion Gerwyn Price was the third seed. The 2019 PDC World Championship and 2020 Masters runner-up Michael Smith was the 4th seed. As well as Van Gerwen and Wright, three other previous PDC world champions qualified as seeds: 2018 world champion Rob Cross was the fifth seed, 2015 and 2016 world champion Gary Anderson was seeded 13th, and 2011 and 2012 world champion Adrian Lewis was the 21st seed. The 2017, 2018, and 2019 BDO World Champion Glen Durrant was the 12th seed. He was one of two former BDO world champions to qualify as seeds, alongside 2014 BDO world champion Stephen Bunting, as 26th seed.

The top seeds below Van Gerwen, Wright, Price, Smith and Cross were 2019 UK Open champion Nathan Aspinall, 2020 Grand Slam and European Championship runner-up James Wade, 2019 World Grand Prix runner-up Dave Chisnall and 2020 World Matchplay champion Dimitri Van den Bergh. 2020 Grand Slam champion José de Sousa was seeded 14th.

=== Pro Tour qualification ===
Damon Heta, in his first full year as a full PDC tour card holder, was the highest-ranked non-seed on the 2020 PDC Pro Tour Order of Merit. Two-time BDO World Champion Scott Waites qualified for the PDC World Championship for the first time, and was one of two former BDO Champions to qualify through the Pro Tour, alongside Steve Beaton, the 1996 BDO champion, competing in a record-breaking 30th consecutive World Championship.

As well as Waites, six other players from the Pro Tour made their PDC World Championship debuts; Mike De Decker, Martijn Kleermaker, Maik Kuivenhoven, Jason Lowe, Ryan Murray and Derk Telnekes. Other players to qualify via the Pro Tour included 2020 World Grand Prix runner-up Dirk van Duijvenbode and 2012 PDC World Championship runner-up Andy Hamilton.

=== International qualifiers ===
The international qualifiers were heavily impacted by the worldwide COVID-19 pandemic, with a number of qualification tournaments being cancelled. The North American Darts Championship was cancelled, with the place being given to Danny Lauby, the winner of the 2019 CDC Continental Cup. The cancellation of the Oceanic Masters resulted in a second place being given on the Dartplayers Australia tour; and the cancellation of the New Zealand championship saw the place instead being given to the top player on the Dartplayers New Zealand tour, Haupai Puha. The qualifiers for India and South America were both cancelled, with the Indian place going to the Indian Darts Federation number one Amit Gilitwala, and the South American place being given to Diogo Portela, who had won the South American qualifier the three previous years it had been held.

The PDC Asia Tour was fully cancelled, with the four places being awarded to the winners of one-off qualification events in China, Hong Kong, Japan, and the Philippines. The Tom Kirby Irish Matchplay as well as qualifiers for Southern Europe, Western Europe, and Central Europe were not held in 2020; with these places being given to the final Pro Tour holders qualifier. One further change saw the two qualification events for female players being replaced with the new, four-event long, PDC Women's Series, with the top two players over those events – four-times BDO Women's World Champion Lisa Ashton and Deta Hedman – qualifying for the World Championship.

The final six places – four from uncompleted qualifiers and two as planned – were given to the winners of an event for Tour Card holders held at the conclusion of the PDC Series. Four places were reserved for players from the UK and Ireland and two from the rest of the world; a change from previous years where the places were unassigned. The six players to get through the qualifier included Jamie Lewis, a former World Championship semi-finalist.

Thirteen players from international qualifiers made their PDC World Championship debuts; Bradley Brooks, Cameron Carolissen, David Evans, Edward Foulkes, Amit Gilitwala, Dmitriy Gorbunov, Deta Hedman, Nick Kenny, Danny Lauby, Haupai Puha, Toru Suzuki, Di Zhuang and Niels Zonneveld.

Martijn Kleermaker withdrew from the tournament after testing positive for COVID-19 on 20 December. As the first alternate Josh Payne had been in close contact with someone who had also received a positive test, Kleermaker's first round opponent Cameron Carolissen received a bye.

== Summary ==
UK government regulations following the COVID-19 pandemic in the United Kingdom allowed Tier 2 areas, including London, to hold sporting events with up to 1,000 spectators indoors. The Professional Darts Corporation announced that the World Championship would be the first PDC event in the United Kingdom to allow fans, since the UK Open in March 2020. Fans attending the event were not allowed to wear fancy dress and 'football style' chanting was prohibited. With London subsequently moving to Tier 3 on 16 December, it meant that the tournament was held behind closed doors for all sessions barring the opening night.

The top quarter of the draw saw number one seed Michael van Gerwen defeat Ryan Murray in the second round, before a 4–0 win over Ricky Evans qualified him for the fourth round. In that round, Van Gerwen came from 3–1 down and survived two darts at the bullseye from Joe Cullen to win in a sudden death last leg and reach the quarter-final for the fifth consecutive year and the eighth time overall. Number eight seed Dave Chisnall reached his third PDC World Championship quarter-final after wins over Keegan Brown, Danny Noppert and Dimitri Van den Bergh. In the quarter-final, Chisnall stunned Michael van Gerwen with a 5–0 whitewash win over the world number one to reach the first PDC World Championship semi-final of his career. This defeat was van Gerwen's first whitewash loss (without winning a set) since 2009, when he lost to Phil Taylor.

The two highest seeds in the second quarter were both eliminated early, with fourth seed Michael Smith losing 3–1 to debutant Jason Lowe and fifth seed Rob Cross losing in a sudden death last leg to Dirk van Duijvenbode. Former world champion Adrian Lewis also exited in the second round, losing to American Danny Baggish 3–1. Two time champion Gary Anderson beat Madars Razma in the second round before beating Mensur Suljović 4–3 in a controversial game, with Anderson accusing his opponent of gamesmanship. Anderson then whitewashed Lowe's conqueror Devon Petersen to reach the eighth PDC World Championship quarterfinal of his career. Van Duijvenbode followed up his win over Cross with a 4–0 win over Adam Hunt and a second last-leg victory, this time over Glen Durrant, to reach his first PDC World Championship quarter-final. Van Duijvenbode won the first set against Anderson in the quarter-final, but Anderson turned the game around including a run of ten legs in a row to win the match 5–1.

Peter Wright opened his title defence with a 3–1 win over Steve West, appearing on stage dressed as The Grinch. Wright's reign was ended in the next round, after Gabriel Clemens won a last leg decider over him. Krzysztof Ratajski made it past Ryan Joyce and Simon Whitlock without dropping a set, before knocking out Clemens with a last leg victory of his own, with both players missing multiple darts to win before Ratajski finally hit double one to take the win and become the first Polish player to make a PDC World Championship quarter-final. Seventh seed James Wade was eliminated in the third round by Stephen Bunting, despite hitting the first perfect Nine-dart finish at the World Championship since Gary Anderson at the 2016 PDC World Darts Championship. Bunting overcame Ryan Searle in the fourth round to qualify for the quarter-finals for the second time. In the quarter-final; Bunting took the first three sets and led 4–1 after the fifth. Ratajski closed the gap to 4–3 over the next two sets but Bunting broke throw in the eighth set to complete the win and qualify for his first PDC World Championship semi-final.

In the fourth quarter, third seed Gerwyn Price came thorough a last set decider against fellow Welshman Jamie Lewis and a sudden death last leg decider against 30th seed Brendan Dolan to reach the fourth round, where he took a 4–1 win over Mervyn King to reach the quarter-final for the second consecutive year. He was joined in the quarter-final by Daryl Gurney, who reached that stage for the second time after wins over William O'Connor, Chris Dobey, and Vincent van der Voort. In the quarter-final, Price twice led by two sets at 2–0 & 4–2; and on both occasions Gurney won the next two sets to level. The final set went to a final leg, with Price eventually hitting the double 20 to win and reach a second consecutive semi-final.

The first semi-final played was between Price and Bunting. Price won the first set and took a 2–0 lead in the second before Bunting fought back to take the second set and the next two. Price took the fifth and sixth sets to level before Bunting again fought back from 2–0 down in a set to lead after the seventh set. Price levelled the match by winning the eighth set and won the last two sets by 3–0 and 3–1 to become the first Welsh player to reach a PDC World Championship final. The thirteen 100+ finishes thrown by the two players was a record combined count for a PDC World Championship match.

In the second semi-final, Anderson and Chisnall shared the first two sets, before Anderson claimed the next two to take a 3–1 lead. Chisnall broke Anderson's throw to take the fifth set, but Anderson immediately broke back and won the sixth. Again, Chisnall won the seventh set but Anderson restored the two set advantage with an eighth set victory. Anderson won all three legs in the ninth set to secure a 6–3 win, qualifying the two-time World Champion for his fifth PDC World Championship final.

The final between Anderson and Price was held on 3 January 2021. Anderson threw first in the first set and won the first two legs, but missed four darts for a 3–0 set win, and Price came back to take the set 3–2. Anderson broke back with a 3–1 win in the second set. Price broke again in the third set despite a "big fish" 170 finish from Anderson, and held his throw in the fourth set to take a 3–1 advantage. Price again broke Anderson's throw in the fifth set, and won the sixth 3–0. Price took a two leg lead in the seventh set, but Anderson fought back to take only his second set of the match. Price regained the four-set advantage by winning the eighth set to go one away from winning the title. Price missed nine darts for the championship in the ninth set, which Anderson won. In the tenth set, Price fought back from 2–0 to eventually take the set and the championship, winning the title on double five.

Price's first World Championship additionally saw him take the number one spot on the PDC Order of Merit away from Michael van Gerwen, the Dutchman having held the title for seven years since winning the 2014 PDC World Darts Championship.

== Schedule ==
Tuesday, 15 December

Game #	Round	Player 1	Score	Player 2	Set 1	Set 2	Set 3	Set 4	Set 5
01	1	Steve West	3 – 0	Amit Gilitwala	3 – 0	3 – 1	3 – 0	—N/a	
02	1	Steve Beaton	0 – 3	Diogo Portela	1 – 3	1 – 3	1 – 3	—N/a	
03	1	Jeff Smith	3 – 1	Keane Barry	3 – 1	3 – 2	2 – 3	3 – 2	—N/a
04	2	Peter Wright	3 – 1	Steve West	3 – 0	3 – 0	1 – 3	3 – 1	—N/a

Wednesday, 16 December

Game #	Round	Player 1	Score	Player 2	Set 1	Set 2	Set 3	Set 4	Set 5
05	1	Ryan Joyce	3 – 2	Karel Sedláček	1 – 3	3 – 0	0 – 3	3 – 1	3 – 2
06	1	Ross Smith	3 – 0	David Evans	3 – 1	3 – 2	3 – 2	—N/a	
07	1	William O'Connor	3 – 0	Niels Zonneveld	3 – 1	3 – 1	3 – 1	—N/a	
08	2	Chris Dobey	3 – 2	Jeff Smith	2 – 3	2 – 3	3 – 2	3 – 1	3 – 0
09	1	Max Hopp	3 – 0	Gordon Mathers	3 – 0	3 – 1	3 – 2	—N/a	
10	1	Callan Rydz	3 – 1	James Bailey	3 – 0	0 – 3	3 – 0	3 – 1	—N/a
11	1	Adam Hunt	3 – 2	Lisa Ashton	2 – 3	3 – 0	3 – 2	2 – 3	3 – 1
12	2	Glen Durrant	3 – 0	Diogo Portela	3 – 0	3 – 0	3 – 2	—N/a	

Thursday, 17 December

Game #	Round	Player 1	Score	Player 2	Set 1	Set 2	Set 3	Set 4	Set 5
13	1	Madars Razma	3 – 0	Toru Suzuki	3 – 2	3 – 2	3 – 2	—N/a	
14	1	Mike De Decker	0 – 3	Edward Foulkes	0 – 3	1 – 3	2 – 3	—N/a	
15	1	Ryan Murray	3 – 1	Lourence Ilagan	3 – 2	0 – 3	3 – 2	3 – 1	—N/a
16	2	Daryl Gurney	3 – 2	William O'Connor	3 – 1	3 – 0	2 – 3	1 – 3	3 – 0
17	1	Luke Woodhouse	2 – 3	Jamie Lewis	3 – 0	3 – 2	1 – 3	1 – 3	1 – 3
18	1	Ron Meulenkamp	3 – 1	Boris Krčmar	0 – 3	3 – 0	3 – 2	3 – 1	—N/a
19	1	Ryan Searle	3 – 2	Danny Lauby	3 – 0	2 – 3	3 – 0	2 – 3	3 – 1
20	2	José de Sousa	3 – 1	Ross Smith	0 – 3	3 – 1	3 – 1	3 – 1	—N/a

Friday, 18 December

Game #	Round	Player 1	Score	Player 2	Set 1	Set 2	Set 3	Set 4	Set 5
21	1	Mickey Mansell	3 – 0	Haupai Puha	3 – 0	3 – 0	3 – 0	—N/a	
22	1	Darius Labanauskas	3 – 0	Chengan Liu	3 – 1	3 – 1	3 – 0	—N/a	
23	1	Wayne Jones	3 – 2	Ciarán Teehan	3 – 0	2 – 3	3 – 2	2 – 3	3 – 0
24	2	Jamie Hughes	0 – 3	Adam Hunt	0 – 3	1 – 3	1 – 3	—N/a	
25	1	Dirk van Duijvenbode	3 – 2	Bradley Brooks	0 – 3	1 – 3	3 – 1	3 – 0	3 – 0
26	1	John Henderson	3 – 2	Marko Kantele	3 – 0	2 – 3	3 – 1	2 – 3	3 – 1
27	1	Luke Humphries	2 – 3	Paul Lim	3 – 1	3 – 1	1 – 3	2 – 3	1 – 3
28	2	James Wade	3 – 0	Callan Rydz	3 – 0	3 – 2	3 – 1	—N/a	

Saturday, 19 December

Game #	Round	Player 1	Score	Player 2	Set 1	Set 2	Set 3	Set 4	Set 5
29	1	Steve Lennon	3 – 1	Daniel Larsson	3 – 1	3 – 1	1 – 3	3 – 0	—N/a
30	1	Scott Waites	3 – 2	Matt Campbell	2 – 3	3 – 2	2 – 3	3 – 2	3 – 2
31	1	Kim Huybrechts	3 – 0	Di Zhuang	3 – 0	3 – 0	3 – 0	—N/a	
32	2	Mervyn King	3 – 1	Max Hopp	3 – 0	3 – 2	2 – 3	3 – 1	—N/a
33	1	Andy Hamilton	1 – 3	Nico Kurz	2 – 3	3 – 2	1 – 3	1 – 3	—N/a
34	1	Andy Boulton	3 – 1	Deta Hedman	3 – 0	3 – 0	0 – 3	3 – 0	—N/a
35	1	Damon Heta	2 – 3	Danny Baggish	2 – 3	2 – 3	3 – 1	3 – 0	2 – 3
36	2	Michael van Gerwen	3 – 1	Ryan Murray	3 – 0	2 – 3	3 – 1	3 – 2	—N/a

Sunday, 20 December

Game #	Round	Player 1	Score	Player 2	Set 1	Set 2	Set 3	Set 4	Set 5
37	1	Derk Telnekes	2 – 3	Nick Kenny	3 – 2	0 – 3	3 – 2	0 – 3	0 – 3
38	1	Jason Lowe	3 – 1	Dmitriy Gorbunov	3 – 0	3 – 1	2 – 3	3 – 2	—N/a
39	1	Maik Kuivenhoven	0 – 3	Matthew Edgar	0 – 3	1 – 3	0 – 3	—N/a	
40	2	Vincent van der Voort	3 – 2	Ron Meulenkamp	1 – 3	1 – 3	3 – 1	3 – 0	3 – 2
41	1	Martijn Kleermaker	w/o	Cameron Carolissen	—N/a				
42	1	Keegan Brown	3 – 0	Ryan Meikle	3 – 2	3 – 0	3 – 2	—N/a	
43	2	Jeffrey de Zwaan	0 – 3	Ryan Searle	2 – 3	1 – 3	1 – 3	—N/a	
44	2	Jonny Clayton	3 – 1	John Henderson	3 – 1	3 – 1	1 – 3	3 – 2	—N/a

Monday, 21 December

Game #	Round	Player 1	Score	Player 2	Set 1	Set 2	Set 3	Set 4	Set 5
45	2	Krzysztof Ratajski	3 – 0	Ryan Joyce	3 – 2	3 – 2	3 – 1	—N/a	
46	2	Ian White	1 – 3	Kim Huybrechts	1 – 3	2 – 3	3 – 1	2 – 3	—N/a
47	2	Gerwyn Price	3 – 2	Jamie Lewis	1 – 3	3 – 1	3 – 1	0 – 3	3 – 0
48	2	Gabriel Clemens	3 – 1	Nico Kurz	3 – 2	1 – 3	3 – 1	3 – 1	—N/a

Tuesday, 22 December

Game #	Round	Player 1	Score	Player 2	Set 1	Set 2	Set 3	Set 4	Set 5
49	2	Brendan Dolan	3 – 1	Edward Foulkes	3 – 0	2 – 3	3 – 2	3 – 0	—N/a
50	2	Joe Cullen	3 – 0	Wayne Jones	3 – 0	3 – 2	3 – 1	—N/a	
51	2	Simon Whitlock	3 – 2	Darius Labanauskas	1 – 3	3 – 1	3 – 1	2 – 3	3 – 0
52	2	Adrian Lewis	1 – 3	Danny Baggish	0 – 3	1 – 3	3 – 1	2 – 3	—N/a
53	2	Danny Noppert	3 – 1	Cameron Carolissen	0 – 3	3 – 2	3 – 2	3 – 2	—N/a
54	2	Devon Petersen	3 – 1	Steve Lennon	3 – 2	3 – 2	2 – 3	3 – 0	—N/a
55	2	Rob Cross	2 – 3	Dirk van Duijvenbode	3 – 1	0 – 3	3 – 2	0 – 3	2 – 3
56	2	Dimitri Van den Bergh	3 – 0	Paul Lim	3 – 0	3 – 1	3 – 1	—N/a	

Wednesday, 23 December

Game #	Round	Player 1	Score	Player 2	Set 1	Set 2	Set 3	Set 4	Set 5
57	2	Ricky Evans	3 – 1	Mickey Mansell	1 – 3	3 – 1	3 – 0	3 – 1	—N/a
58	2	Gary Anderson	3 – 1	Madars Razma	3 – 0	1 – 3	3 – 1	3 – 2	—N/a
59	2	Stephen Bunting	3 – 2	Andy Boulton	1 – 3	3 – 2	3 – 0	0 – 3	3 – 2
60	2	Mensur Suljović	3 – 1	Matthew Edgar	3 – 0	2 – 3	3 – 0	3 – 1	—N/a
61	2	Dave Chisnall	3 – 1	Keegan Brown	2 – 3	3 – 2	3 – 1	3 – 2	—N/a
62	2	Jermaine Wattimena	3 – 1	Nick Kenny	3 – 1	1 – 3	3 – 1	3 – 1	—N/a
63	2	Nathan Aspinall	3 – 2	Scott Waites	1 – 3	2 – 3	3 – 1	3 – 1	3 – 2
64	2	Michael Smith	1 – 3	Jason Lowe	0 – 3	0 – 3	3 – 2	0 – 3	—N/a

Sunday, 27 December

Game #	Round	Player 1	Score	Player 2	Set 1	Set 2	Set 3	Set 4	Set 5	Set 6	Set 7
65	3	Krzysztof Ratajski	4 – 0	Simon Whitlock	3 – 1	3 – 1	3 – 2	3 – 2	—N/a		
66	3	Kim Huybrechts	2 – 4	Ryan Searle	0 – 3	3 – 0	0 – 3	1 – 3	3 – 1	2 – 3	—N/a
67	3	Dimitri Van den Bergh	4 – 0	Jermaine Wattimena	3 – 1	3 – 2	3 – 1	3 – 0	—N/a		
68	3	Joe Cullen	4 – 3	Jonny Clayton	3 – 1	3 – 2	0 – 3	2 – 3	1 – 3	3 – 0	3 – 2
69	3	Peter Wright	3 – 4	Gabriel Clemens	3 – 1	1 – 3	0 – 3	3 – 2	2 – 3	3 – 0	2 – 3
70	3	Michael van Gerwen	4 – 0	Ricky Evans	3 – 1	3 – 2	3 – 2	3 – 2	—N/a		

Monday, 28 December

Game #	Round	Player 1	Score	Player 2	Set 1	Set 2	Set 3	Set 4	Set 5	Set 6	Set 7
71	3	José de Sousa	0 – 4	Mervyn King	1 – 3	0 – 3	2 – 3	1 – 3	—N/a		
72	3	Dirk van Duijvenbode	4 – 0	Adam Hunt	3 – 2	3 – 1	3 – 2	3 – 1	—N/a		
73	3	Nathan Aspinall	2 – 4	Vincent van der Voort	0 – 3	0 – 3	3 – 1	3 – 2	1 – 3	1 – 3	—N/a
74	3	Gary Anderson	4 – 3	Mensur Suljović	3 – 2	2 – 3	3 – 2	0 – 3	0 – 3	3 – 0	3 – 0
75	3	Gerwyn Price	4 – 3	Brendan Dolan	3 – 2	0 – 3	3 – 0	2 – 3	3 – 0	2 – 3	3 – 2
76	3	Glen Durrant	4 – 2	Danny Baggish	3 – 0	3 – 2	3 – 1	2 – 3	1 – 3	3 – 2	—N/a

Tuesday, 29 December

Game #	Round	Player 1	Score	Player 2	Set 1	Set 2	Set 3	Set 4	Set 5	Set 6	Set 7
77	3	James Wade	2 – 4	Stephen Bunting	3 – 2	3 – 1	1 – 3	1 – 3	2 – 3	2 – 3	—N/a
78	3	Daryl Gurney	4 – 1	Chris Dobey	3 – 2	3 – 1	3 – 2	1 – 3	3 – 0	—N/a	
79	3	Jason Lowe	0 – 4	Devon Petersen	1 – 3	2 – 3	0 – 3	2 – 3	—N/a		
80	3	Dave Chisnall	4 – 2	Danny Noppert	0 – 3	0 – 3	3 – 0	3 – 1	3 – 1	3 – 0	—N/a
81	4	Gabriel Clemens	3 – 4	Krzysztof Ratajski	2 – 3	3 – 1	2 – 3	3 – 2	2 – 3	3 – 2	2 – 3
82	4	Michael van Gerwen	4 – 3	Joe Cullen	2 – 3	3 – 2	2 – 3	2 – 3	3 – 1	3 – 2	3 – 2

Wednesday, 30 December

Game #	Round	Player 1	Score	Player 2	Set 1	Set 2	Set 3	Set 4	Set 5	Set 6	Set 7
83	4	Vincent van der Voort	2 – 4	Daryl Gurney	1 – 3	3 – 2	1 – 3	1 – 3	3 – 0	2 – 3	—N/a
84	4	Stephen Bunting	4 – 3	Ryan Searle	3 – 1	3 – 2	2 – 3	1 – 3	3 – 0	1 – 3	3 – 2
85	4	Devon Petersen	0 – 4	Gary Anderson	0 – 3	2 – 3	2 – 3	0 – 3	—N/a		
86	4	Dirk van Duijvenbode	4 – 3	Glen Durrant	1 – 3	2 – 3	3 – 1	1 – 3	3 – 1	3 – 1	3 – 2
87	4	Gerwyn Price	4 – 1	Mervyn King	3 – 0	2 – 3	3 – 1	3 – 2	3 – 1	—N/a	
88	4	Dave Chisnall	4 – 2	Dimitri Van den Bergh	3 – 1	3 – 1	3 – 2	0 – 3	1 – 3	3 – 1	—N/a

Friday, 1 January

Game #	Round	Player 1	Score	Player 2	Set 1	Set 2	Set 3	Set 4	Set 5	Set 6	Set 7	Set 8	Set 9
89	QF	Krzysztof Ratajski	3 – 5	Stephen Bunting	1 – 3	1 – 3	2 – 3	3 – 2	2 – 3	3 – 1	3 – 1	0 – 3	—N/a
90	QF	Gary Anderson	5 – 1	Dirk van Duijvenbode	1 – 3	3 – 1	3 – 0	3 – 0	3 – 1	3 – 2	—N/a		
91	QF	Gerwyn Price	5 – 4	Daryl Gurney	3 – 1	3 – 0	1 – 3	1 – 3	3 – 1	3 – 2	0 – 3	0 – 3	3 – 2
92	QF	Michael van Gerwen	0 – 5	Dave Chisnall	1 – 3	2 – 3	2 – 3	1 – 3	1 – 3	—N/a			

Saturday, 2 January

Game #	Round	Player 1	Score	Player 2	Set 1	Set 2	Set 3	Set 4	Set 5	Set 6	Set 7	Set 8	Set 9	Set 10	Set 11
93	SF	Stephen Bunting	4 – 6	Gerwyn Price	2 – 3	3 – 2	3 – 2	3 – 1	1 – 3	1 – 3	3 – 2	1 – 3	0 – 3	1 – 3	—N/a
94	SF	Dave Chisnall	3 – 6	Gary Anderson	2 – 3	3 – 2	2 – 3	1 – 3	3 – 2	2 – 3	3 – 1	0 – 3	0 – 3	—N/a	

Sunday, 3 January

Game #	Round	Player 1	Score	Player 2	Set 1	Set 2	Set 3	Set 4	Set 5	Set 6	Set 7	Set 8	Set 9	Set 10	Set 11	Set 12	Set 13
95	F	Gary Anderson	3 – 7	Gerwyn Price	2 – 3	3 – 1	1 – 3	1 – 3	1 – 3	0 – 3	3 – 2	2 – 3	3 – 2	2 – 3	—N/a		

== Draw ==
The draw took place on 3 December 2020, live on Sky Sports News.

=== Final ===
Final: Best of 13 sets Referee: Paul Hinks; Alexandra Palace, London, England, 3 January 2021
(13) Gary Anderson	3 – 7	Gerwyn Price (3)
2–3, 3–1, 1–3, 1–3, 1–3, 0–3, 3–2, 2–3, 3–2, 2–3
94.25	Average (3 darts)	100.08
56	100+ scores	62
22	140+ scores	27
10	180 scores	13
170	Highest checkout	161
2	100+ Checkouts	3
26.87%	Checkout summary	45.61%

=== Finals ===
Quarter-finals (best of 9 sets); 1 January
1	Michael van Gerwen 98.29	0
8	Dave Chisnall 107.34	5
13	Gary Anderson 101.07	5
Dirk van Duijvenbode 94.29	1
15	Krzysztof Ratajski 97.58	3
26	Stephen Bunting 101.01	5
3	Gerwyn Price 96.36	5
11	Daryl Gurney 96.25	4

Semi-finals (best of 11 sets); 2 January
8	Dave Chisnall 98.57	3
13	Gary Anderson 100.03	6
26	Stephen Bunting 96.38	4
3	Gerwyn Price 100.92	6

Final (best of 13 sets); 3 January
13	Gary Anderson 94.25	3
3	Gerwyn Price 100.08	7

=== Top half ===
==== Section 1 ====
First round (best of 5 sets); 15–20 December
Ryan Murray 87.11	3
Q	Lourence Ilagan 88.28	1
Mickey Mansell 93.94	3
Q	Haupai Puha 79.72	0
Wayne Jones 86.18	3
Q	Ciarán Teehan 86.31	2
John Henderson 91.09	3
Q	Marko Kantele 79.69	2
Keegan Brown 93.81	3
Q	Ryan Meikle 96.66	0
Martijn Kleermaker	w/d
Q	Cameron Carolissen	w/o
Luke Humphries 92.28	2
Q	Paul Lim 89.77	3
Derk Telnekes 87.15	2
Q	Nick Kenny 87.33	3

Second round (best of 5 sets); 15–23 December
1	Michael van Gerwen 108.98	3
Ryan Murray 95.14	1
32	Ricky Evans 93.61	3
Mickey Mansell 88.89	1
16	Joe Cullen 94.59	3
Wayne Jones 88.78	0
17	Jonny Clayton 90.57	3
John Henderson 87.42	1
8	Dave Chisnall 97.35	3
Keegan Brown 86.59	1
25	Danny Noppert 80.56	3
Q	Cameron Carolissen 82.19	1
9	Dimitri Van den Bergh 105.61	3
Q	Paul Lim 88.98	0
24	Jermaine Wattimena 90.59	3
Q	Nick Kenny 88.45	1

Third round (best of 7 sets); 27–29 December
1	Michael van Gerwen 106.85	4
32	Ricky Evans 100.68	0
16	Joe Cullen 92.34	4
17	Jonny Clayton 91.41	3
8	Dave Chisnall 99.69	4
25	Danny Noppert 88.70	2
9	Dimitri Van den Bergh 96.63	4
24	Jermaine Wattimena 89.24	0

Fourth round (best of 7 sets); 29–30 December
1	Michael van Gerwen 100.43	4
16	Joe Cullen 97.23	3
8	Dave Chisnall 101.76	4
9	Dimitri Van den Bergh 102.17	2

Quarter-finals (best of 9 sets); 1 January
1	Michael van Gerwen 98.29	0
8	Dave Chisnall 107.34	5

==== Section 2 ====
First round (best of 5 sets); 15–20 December
Jason Lowe 86.72	3
Q	Dmitriy Gorbunov 80.56	1
Steve Lennon 96.95	3
Q	Daniel Larsson 83.22	1
Madars Razma 89.21	3
Q	Toru Suzuki 81.36	0
Maik Kuivenhoven 81.00	0
Q	Matthew Edgar 87.69	3
Dirk van Duijvenbode 92.57	3
Q	Bradley Brooks 92.70	2
Adam Hunt 94.29	3
Q	Lisa Ashton 91.33	2
Steve Beaton 84.14	0
Q	Diogo Portela 89.16	3
Damon Heta 91.65	2
Q	Danny Baggish 88.44	3

Second round (best of 5 sets); 15–23 December
4	Michael Smith 92.64	1
Jason Lowe 96.24	3
29	Devon Petersen 89.08	3
Steve Lennon 89.34	1
13	Gary Anderson 96.86	3
Madars Razma 91.92	1
20	Mensur Suljović 98.18	3
Q	Matthew Edgar 92.18	1
5	Rob Cross 92.39	2
Dirk van Duijvenbode 95.54	3
28	Jamie Hughes 75.36	0
Adam Hunt 91.77	3
12	Glen Durrant 88.37	3
Q	Diogo Portela 79.63	0
21	Adrian Lewis 92.73	1
Q	Danny Baggish 93.39	3

Third round (best of 7 sets); 27–29 December
Jason Lowe 88.73	0
29	Devon Petersen 91.55	4
13	Gary Anderson 92.49	4
20	Mensur Suljović 89.78	3
Dirk van Duijvenbode 104.09	4
Adam Hunt 97.39	0
12	Glen Durrant 95.41	4
Q	Danny Baggish 91.59	2

Fourth round (best of 7 sets); 29–30 December
29	Devon Petersen 94.97	0
13	Gary Anderson 95.55	4
Dirk van Duijvenbode 96.75	4
12	Glen Durrant 90.76	3

Quarter-finals (best of 9 sets); 1 January
13	Gary Anderson 101.07	5
Dirk van Duijvenbode 94.29	1

=== Bottom half ===
==== Section 3 ====
First round (best of 5 sets); 15–20 December
Steve West 90.37	3
Q	Amit Gilitwala 80.48	0
Andy Hamilton 82.15	1
Q	Nico Kurz 87.89	3
Ryan Joyce 92.22	3
Q	Karel Sedláček 93.11	2
Darius Labanauskas 96.07	3
Q	Chengan Liu 79.57	0
Callan Rydz 93.53	3
Q	James Bailey 89.79	1
Andy Boulton 90.65	3
Q	Deta Hedman 79.92	1
Kim Huybrechts 104.05	3
Q	Di Zhuang 73.09	0
Ryan Searle 98.31	3
Q	Danny Lauby 88.98	2

Second round (best of 5 sets); 15–23 December
2	Peter Wright 92.60	3
Steve West 88.82	1
31	Gabriel Clemens 95.70	3
Q	Nico Kurz 89.98	1
15	Krzysztof Ratajski 100.41	3
Ryan Joyce 96.12	0
18	Simon Whitlock 101.21	3
Darius Labanauskas 95.50	2
7	James Wade 93.17	3
Callan Rydz 78.05	0
26	Stephen Bunting 93.21	3
Andy Boulton 95.36	2
10	Ian White 102.35	1
Kim Huybrechts 101.59	3
23	Jeffrey de Zwaan 98.20	0
Ryan Searle 92.72	3

Third round (best of 7 sets); 27–29 December
2	Peter Wright 101.50	3
31	Gabriel Clemens 98.65	4
15	Krzysztof Ratajski 93.37	4
18	Simon Whitlock 93.69	0
7	James Wade 87.94	2
26	Stephen Bunting 93.18	4
Kim Huybrechts 90.03	2
Ryan Searle 91.79	4

Fourth round (best of 7 sets); 29–30 December
31	Gabriel Clemens 92.05	3
15	Krzysztof Ratajski 95.58	4
26	Stephen Bunting 97.86	4
Ryan Searle 98.15	3

Quarter-finals (best of 9 sets); 1 January
15	Krzysztof Ratajski 97.58	3
26	Stephen Bunting 101.01	5

==== Section 4 ====
First round (best of 5 sets); 15–20 December
Luke Woodhouse 92.23	2
Q	Jamie Lewis 90.67	3
Mike De Decker 86.74	0
Q	Edward Foulkes 90.97	3
Ross Smith 93.18	3
Q	David Evans 91.89	0
Max Hopp 94.94	3
Q	Gordon Mathers 81.03	0
Scott Waites 96.13	3
Q	Matt Campbell 94.97	2
Ron Meulenkamp 87.71	3
Q	Boris Krčmar 89.82	1
William O'Connor 88.42	3
Q	Niels Zonneveld 83.37	0
Jeff Smith 85.44	3
Q	Keane Barry 88.11	1

Second round (best of 5 sets); 15–23 December
3	Gerwyn Price 91.97	3
Q	Jamie Lewis 90.46	2
30	Brendan Dolan 90.69	3
Q	Edward Foulkes 84.00	1
14	José de Sousa 93.93	3
Ross Smith 93.73	1
19	Mervyn King 99.64	3
Max Hopp 94.19	1
6	Nathan Aspinall 92.70	3
Scott Waites 96.27	2
27	Vincent van der Voort 95.49	3
Ron Meulenkamp 93.76	2
11	Daryl Gurney 99.19	3
William O'Connor 92.40	2
22	Chris Dobey 96.26	3
Jeff Smith 95.21	2

Third round (best of 7 sets); 27–29 December
3	Gerwyn Price 99.74	4
30	Brendan Dolan 97.30	3
14	José de Sousa 103.62	0
19	Mervyn King 103.47	4
6	Nathan Aspinall 91.03	2
27	Vincent van der Voort 93.77	4
11	Daryl Gurney 101.39	4
22	Chris Dobey 99.29	1

Fourth round (best of 7 sets); 29–30 December
3	Gerwyn Price 97.71	4
19	Mervyn King 98.15	1
27	Vincent van der Voort 94.81	2
11	Daryl Gurney 93.65	4

Quarter-finals (best of 9 sets); 1 January
3	Gerwyn Price 96.36	5
11	Daryl Gurney 96.25	4

== Statistics ==
Player	Eliminated	Played	Sets Won	Sets Lost	Legs Won	Legs Lost	100+	140+	180s	High Checkout	Checkout Av.%	Average
Gerwyn Price	Winner	6	29	17	108	84	242	123	55	170	44.26	98.44
Gary Anderson	Runner-up	6	25	15	86	78	194	124	43	170	39.00	96.58
Dave Chisnall	Semi-final	5	19	11	67	56	154	72	51	170	42.95	100.68
Stephen Bunting	Semi-final	5	20	16	78	76	187	111	37	170	41.52	96.63
Michael van Gerwen	Quarter-final	4	11	9	48	44	109	68	23	150	47.37	103.37
Daryl Gurney	Quarter-final	4	15	10	57	43	105	68	33	130	38.71	97.15
Dirk van Duijvenbode	Quarter-final	5	15	12	57	50	68	51	19	170	37.88	96.50
Krzysztof Ratajski	Quarter-final	4	14	8	53	47	116	67	22	127	37.14	96.45
Dimitri Van den Bergh	Fourth round	3	9	4	32	19	53	48	22	126	43.50	100.99
Mervyn King	Fourth round	3	8	5	30	24	69	39	17	170	42.86	100.16
Gabriel Clemens	Fourth round	3	10	8	42	38	85	60	20	144	40.60	95.45
Ryan Searle	Fourth round	4	13	8	49	36	103	73	21	145	37.41	94.72
Joe Cullen	Fourth round	3	10	7	40	35	148	70	31	124	33.90	94.72
Vincent van der Voort	Fourth round	3	9	8	37	31	85	37	16	121	42.53	94.69
Devon Petersen	Fourth round	3	7	5	27	24	61	34	21	160	31.65	91.86
Glen Durrant	Fourth round	3	9	6	38	29	72	38	15	154	42.22	91.51
José de Sousa	Third round	2	3	5	13	18	40	14	13	80	38.75	98.60
Kim Huybrechts	Third round	3	8	5	28	21	112	54	16	140	41.18	98.56
Peter Wright	Third round	2	6	5	24	19	60	28	11	144	33.76	98.39
Chris Dobey	Third round	2	4	6	21	22	56	29	10	130	34.51	97.68
Simon Whitlock	Third round	2	3	6	18	20	83	49	15	120	29.03	97.45
Ricky Evans	Third round	2	3	5	17	17	32	18	12	104	48.57	97.31
Adam Hunt	Third round	3	6	6	28	23	60	32	17	145	41.64	94.48
Brendan Dolan	Third round	2	6	5	24	21	63	32	5	120	42.86	94.00
Mensur Suljović	Third round	2	6	5	24	18	47	27	15	140	40.02	93.98
Nathan Aspinall	Third round	2	5	6	20	25	48	31	8	160	38.28	91.86
Danny Baggish	Third round	3	8	7	31	33	95	39	8	170	32.87	91.14
Jonny Clayton	Third round	2	6	5	24	22	60	28	10	140	39.11	90.99
Jason Lowe	Third round	3	6	6	27	21	63	22	10	135	31.61	90.56
James Wade	Third round	2	5	4	21	18	66	20	9	141	53.85	90.56
Jermaine Wattimena	Third round	2	3	5	14	18	59	26	4	156	29.79	89.92
Danny Noppert	Third round	2	6	5	17	21	40	17	5	160	31.18	84.63
Ian White	Second round	1	1	3	8	10	19	20	4	127	25.00	102.35
Jeffrey de Zwaan	Second round	1	0	3	4	9	12	8	9	81	25.00	98.20
Scott Waites	Second round	2	5	5	23	24	102	44	15	125	46.94	96.20
Darius Labanauskas	Second round	2	5	3	17	14	39	19	7	164	46.05	95.78
Max Hopp	Second round	2	4	3	15	12	34	24	8	100	41.82	94.56
Ryan Joyce	Second round	2	3	5	15	18	41	18	7	110	41.67	94.17
Ross Smith	Second round	2	4	3	15	14	27	27	7	136	34.67	93.46
Steve Lennon	Second round	2	4	4	17	16	41	25	8	130	26.84	93.15
Andy Boulton	Second round	2	5	4	19	13	76	32	8	149	38.31	93.01
Adrian Lewis	Second round	1	1	3	6	10	15	7	6	127	21.43	92.73
Michael Smith	Second round	1	1	3	3	11	32	16	2	74	21.43	92.64
Rob Cross	Second round	1	2	3	8	12	27	7	4	90	53.33	92.40
Mickey Mansell	Second round	2	4	6	14	15	32	19	6	86	41.29	91.41
Ryan Murray	Second round	2	4	4	15	19	28	20	5	130	41.67	91.12
Ron Meulenkamp	Second round	2	5	4	18	17	36	30	6	144	38.57	90.74
Jamie Lewis	Second round	2	5	5	19	19	44	23	10	110	39.40	90.57
Madars Razma	Second round	2	4	3	15	16	36	11	2	81	40.18	90.57
William O'Connor	Second round	2	5	3	16	15	35	21	7	122	29.98	90.41
Jeff Smith	Second round	2	5	4	20	21	44	18	7	116	41.82	90.36
Keegan Brown	Second round	2	4	3	17	15	42	14	3	126	47.17	90.20
Matthew Edgar	Second round	2	4	3	13	12	52	25	4	112	65.00	89.94
Steve West	Second round	2	4	3	13	11	26	11	10	98	39.61	89.50
Paul Lim	Second round	2	3	5	13	19	35	26	2	121	65.28	89.37
John Henderson	Second round	2	4	5	20	18	52	26	9	112	31.47	89.26
Nico Kurz	Second round	2	4	4	18	17	48	22	6	161	36.63	88.94
Nick Kenny	Second round	2	4	5	19	16	43	17	6	119	34.70	87.89
Edward Foulkes	Second round	2	4	3	14	14	36	17	2	140	37.50	87.49
Wayne Jones	Second round	2	3	5	16	17	37	23	5	143	31.70	87.48
Callan Rydz	Second round	2	3	4	12	13	28	10	4	117	33.75	85.79
Diogo Portela	Second round	2	3	3	11	12	31	10	0	85	28.65	84.40
Cameron Carolissen	Second round	1	1	3	9	9	21	9	4	70	29.02	82.19
Jamie Hughes	Second round	1	0	3	2	9	11	4	0	67	66.67	75.36
Ryan Meikle	First round	1	0	3	4	9	19	4	5	119	36.36	96.66
Matt Campbell	First round	1	2	3	12	13	35	18	4	160	46.15	94.97
Karel Sedláček	First round	1	2	3	9	10	30	11	1	111	34.62	93.11
Bradley Brooks	First round	1	2	3	7	10	22	14	1	87	28.00	92.70
Luke Humphries	First round	1	2	3	10	11	27	14	7	108	23.81	92.28
Luke Woodhouse	First round	1	2	3	9	11	24	13	3	145	60.00	92.23
David Evans	First round	1	0	3	5	9	20	8	4	80	23.81	91.89
Damon Heta	First round	1	2	3	12	10	22	20	3	160	36.36	91.65
Lisa Ashton	First round	1	2	3	9	13	33	9	3	101	39.13	91.33
Boris Krčmar	First round	1	1	3	6	9	19	10	5	96	26.09	89.82
James Bailey	First round	1	1	3	4	9	11	10	3	115	25.00	89.79
Danny Lauby	First round	1	2	3	7	13	21	15	2	148	25.00	88.98
Lourence Ilagan	First round	1	1	3	8	9	20	9	5	109	42.11	88.28
Keane Barry	First round	1	1	3	8	11	28	11	2	80	26.67	88.11
Derk Telnekes	First round	1	2	3	6	13	24	11	2	106	20.00	87.15
Mike De Decker	First round	1	0	3	3	9	16	4	2	117	23.08	86.74
Ciarán Teehan	First round	1	2	3	8	13	23	9	3	101	30.77	86.31
Steve Beaton	First round	1	0	3	3	9	18	4	0	38	25.00	84.14
Niels Zonneveld	First round	1	0	3	3	9	17	8	0	110	33.33	83.87
Daniel Larsson	First round	1	1	3	5	10	21	5	0	129	45.45	83.22
Andy Hamilton	First round	1	1	3	7	11	14	8	5	72	30.43	83.15
Toru Suzuki	First round	1	0	3	6	9	22	10	0	76	24.00	81.36
Gordon Mathers	First round	1	0	3	3	9	19	4	0	139	23.08	81.03
Maik Kuivenhoven	First round	1	0	3	1	9	8	3	3	64	9.09	81.00
Dmitriy Gorbunov	First round	1	1	3	6	11	22	10	1	141	30.00	80.56
Amit Gilitwala	First round	1	0	3	1	9	7	5	0	40	12.50	80.48
Deta Hedman	First round	1	1	3	3	9	15	8	2	50	27.27	79.92
Haupai Puha	First round	1	0	3	0	9	7	2	0	0	0	79.72
Marko Kantele	First round	1	2	3	8	13	19	8	2	70	30.77	79.69
Chengan Liu	First round	1	0	3	2	9	15	4	2	124	50.00	79.57
Di Zhuang	First round	1	0	3	0	9	11	0	1	0	0	73.09
Martijn Kleermaker	First round	—N/a (Note: Kleermaker withdrew from the competition on 20 December, after testing positive for COVID-19)										

== Top averages ==
This table shows the highest averages achieved by players throughout the tournament.

#	Player	Round	Average	Result
1	Michael van Gerwen	R2	108.98	Won
2	Dave Chisnall	QF	107.34	Won
3	Michael van Gerwen	R3	106.85	Won
4	Dimitri Van den Bergh	R2	105.61	Won
5	Dirk van Duijvenbode	R3	104.09	Won
6	Kim Huybrechts	R1	104.05	Won
7	José de Sousa	R3	103.62	Lost
8	Mervyn King	R3	103.47	Won
9	Ian White	R2	102.35	Lost
10	Dimitri Van den Bergh	R4	102.17	Lost

== Representation ==
This table shows the number of players by country in the 2021 PDC World Championship. A total of 29 nationalities were represented, surpassing the record of the 2020 and 2019 editions by one.

	(Scotland) SCO	(Wales) WAL	(England) ENG	(Netherlands) NED	(Northern Ireland) NIR	(Poland) POL	(Belgium) BEL	(Germany) GER	(South Africa) RSA	(Australia) AUS	(United States) USA	(Austria) AUT	(Portugal) POR	(Republic of Ireland) IRL	(Canada) CAN	(Japan) JPN	(Brazil) BRA	(Latvia) LAT	(Lithuania) LTU	(Singapore) SIN	(China) CHN	(Croatia) CRO	(Czech Republic) CZE	(Finland) FIN	(India) IND	(New Zealand) NZL	(Philippines) PHI	(Russia) RUS	(Sweden) SWE	Total
Final	1	1	—N/a																											2
Semi-final	1	1	2	—N/a																										4
Quarter-final	1	1	2	2	1	1	—N/a																							8
Round 4	1	1	6	3	1	1	1	1	1	—N/a																				16
Round 3	2	2	12	5	2	1	2	1	1	1	1	1	1	—N/a																32
Round 2	4	4	26	7	3	1	2	3	2	1	1	1	1	2	1	1	1	1	1	1	—N/a									64
Round 1	2	2	21	6	1	—N/a	2	2	1	3	2	—N/a	—N/a	4	2	2	1	1	1	1	2	1	1	1	1	1	1	1	1	64
Total	4	4	35	11	3	1	3	3	2	4	2	1	1	4	2	2	1	1	1	1	2	1	1	1	1	1	1	1	1	96

== Broadcasting rights ==
=== Television ===
Country	Channel
Australia	Fox Sports
Austria; Germany; Switzerland	Sport1, DAZN
Belgium	VTM 4
Brazil	DAZN
Croatia	Sportska Televizija
Czech Republic; Slovakia	Nova Sport
Denmark	TV3 Sport (Denmark)
Estonia; Latvia; Lithuania	TV3 Sport (Baltics)
France	L'Équipe
Hungary	Sport1, Sport2
Iceland	Stöð 2 Sport
Italy	DAZN
Netherlands	RTL 7
New Zealand	Sky Sport
Poland	TVP Sport
Russia	Match TV
Spain	DAZN
United Kingdom; Ireland	Sky Sports Darts
United States	DAZN
