= Dmitriy Gorbunov =

Russian darts player

Personal information
- Nickname: Uncle Sam
- Born: 16 September 1977 (age 49) Novouralsk, Russian SFSR

Sport
- Sport: Darts
- Playing since: 2015
- Darts: 19g Harrows Assassin
- Laterality: Right-handed
- Walk-on music: "In the Heat of the Night" by Star Pilots

Organisation (see split in darts)
- PDC: 2020
- WDF: 2021–
- Current world ranking: (WDF) NR (17 August 2026)

PDC premier events – best performances
- World Championship: Last 96: 2021

Other tournament wins
- Years
Russian Cup	2020
EADC Qualifier	2020
EADC Pro Tour	2021 (x4)

Dmitriy (Note: Alternatively spelled Dmitrii) Alexandrovich Gorbunov (Russian: Дмитрий Александрович Горбунов; born 16 September 1977) is a Russian professional darts player who played in Professional Darts Corporation tournaments.

== Darts career ==
=== In Russia ===
In March 2015, Gorbunov got the first experience in his career. He decided to take part in the Novouralsk Darts Cup (local amateur tournament), where four people played, and took third place. At the beginning of 2016, Dmitry won the Ural Darts League, a prestigious local russian tournament.

=== PDC ===
He entered the 2020 PDC Q-School, but only won two matches in four events, and got into the last 256. He then entered the Eurotour qualification and reached the semifinals.

Gorbunov qualified for the 2021 PDC World Darts Championship after winning the EuroAsian Darts Corporation Qualifier tournament, defeating Roman Obukhov 3-1 in sets in the final.

In 2021, he won the first two events on the EADC Tour, defeating Evgeniy Izotov in both finals 6–3 and 6–5 respectively. He won two further events on the EADC Tour, defeating Vitaliy Khohryakov 6-3 and Evgeniy Izotov 6-3. Gorbunov topped the rankings on EADC Tour and will partner Tour Card Holder Boris Koltsov in the 2021 PDC World Cup of Darts to represent Russia.

== World Championship Results ==
=== PDC ===
- 2021: First round (lost to Jason Lowe 1–3)
