= 2021 Players Championship Finals =

2021 Ladbrokes Players Championship Finals

Tournament information
- Dates: 26–28 November 2021
- Venue: Butlin's Minehead
- Location: Minehead, England
- Organisation(s): Professional Darts Corporation (PDC)
- Format: Legs
- Prize fund: £500,000
- Winner's share: £100,000
- High checkout: 170; Dimitri Van den Bergh; Krzysztof Ratajski; Joe Cullen

Champion(s)
- Peter Wright (SCO)

The 2021 Ladbrokes Players Championship Finals was the fourteenth edition of the PDC darts tournament, which saw the top 64 players from the 2021 PDC Players Championship series taking part. The tournament took place from 26 to 28 November 2021 at the Butlin's Resort, Minehead, returning to its usual venue after being held behind closed doors at the Coventry Arena in Coventry in 2020.

Michael van Gerwen was the two-time defending champion after defeating Mervyn King 11–10 in the 2020 final, but lost to Peter Wright at the quarter-final stage. This was the first time since 2014 that van Gerwen failed to reach the final.

Wright went on to win the tournament for the first time, defeating Ryan Searle 11–10 in the final.

== Prize money ==
The 2021 Players Championship Finals had a total prize fund of £500,000, the same amount that was available in 2019 and 2020.

The following is the breakdown of the fund:

Position (no. of players)		Prize money (Total: £500,000)
Winner	(1)	£100,000
Runner-up	(1)	£50,000
Semi-finalists	(2)	£25,000
Quarter-finalists	(4)	£15,000
Last 16 (third round)	(8)	£10,000
Last 32 (second round)	(16)	£5,000
Last 64 (first round)	(32)	£2,500

== Qualification ==
The top 64 players from the Players Championships Order of Merit qualified, which is solely based on prize money won in the 30 Players Championships events during the season.

On 23 November, it was announced that Jamie Hughes was forced to withdraw after testing positive for COVID-19. His place in the draw was taken by Jelle Klaasen, who was next on the list.

The following players qualified:

Click on the seed number of a player to go to their draw section.

=== Top 64 in the Players Championship Order of Merit ===
1. José de Sousa (quarter-finals)
2. Peter Wright (champion)
3. Jonny Clayton (semi-finals)
4. Michael Smith (second round)
5. Ryan Searle (runner-up)
6. Joe Cullen (first round)
7. Michael van Gerwen (quarter-finals)
8. Gerwyn Price (third round)
9. Brendan Dolan (semi-finals)
10. Dirk van Duijvenbode (first round)
11. Dimitri Van den Bergh (second round)
12. Rob Cross (third round)
13. Callan Rydz (second round)
14. Ross Smith (second round)
15. Damon Heta (third round)
16. Chris Dobey (first round)
17. Krzysztof Ratajski (second round)
18. Gabriel Clemens (second round)
19. Luke Humphries (third round)
20. James Wade (third round)
21. Nathan Aspinall (second round)
22. Danny Noppert (third round)
23. Stephen Bunting (first round)
24. Dave Chisnall (first round)
25. Martin Schindler (second round)
26. Raymond van Barneveld (second round)
27. Vincent van der Voort (quarter-finals)
28. Ryan Joyce (second round)
29. Daryl Gurney (quarter-finals)
30. Scott Mitchell (second round))
31. Adrian Lewis (second round)
32. Mervyn King (first round)
33. Darius Labanauskas (second round)
34. Kim Huybrechts (first round)
35. Martijn Kleermaker (first round)
36. Alan Soutar (first round)
37. Luke Woodhouse (first round)
38. ~~Jamie Hughes~~ (withdrew)
39. Maik Kuivenhoven (first round)
40. Ian White (first round)
41. Ritchie Edhouse (second round)
42. Gary Anderson (third round)
43. Rowby-John Rodriguez (first round)
44. Jeff Smith (first round)
45. Ricky Evans (first round)
46. Jason Heaver (first round)
47. Steve Beaton (first round)
48. Ron Meulenkamp (first round)
49. William O'Connor (third round)
50. Steve Lennon (first round)
51. Rusty-Jake Rodriguez (first round)
52. Mensur Suljović (first round)
53. Jermaine Wattimena (first round)
54. Madars Razma (first round)
55. Ryan Meikle (second round)
56. Chas Barstow (first round)
57. Jason Lowe (first round)
58. Kevin Doets (first round)
59. Andy Boulton (second round)
60. Simon Whitlock (first round)
61. William Borland (first round)
62. Alan Tabern (first round)
63. Keane Barry (first round)
64. Devon Petersen (first round)
65. Jelle Klaasen (first round)

== Draw ==
=== Finals ===
Quarter-finals (best of 19 legs); 28 November
1	José de Sousa 94.04	4
9	Brendan Dolan 94.75	10
29	Daryl Gurney 101.71	9
5	Ryan Searle 101.26	10
2	Peter Wright 98.80	10
7	Michael van Gerwen 101.64	6
3	Jonny Clayton 89.60	10
27	Vincent van der Voort 82.81	3

Semi-finals (best of 21 legs); 28 November
9	Brendan Dolan 95.94	6
5	Ryan Searle 91.98	11
2	Peter Wright 94.97	11
3	Jonny Clayton 94.33	6

Final (best of 21 legs); 28 November
5	Ryan Searle 92.10	10
2	Peter Wright 95.49	11

=== Top half ===
==== Section 1 ====
First round (best of 11 legs); 26 November
1	José de Sousa 92.78	6
64	Devon Petersen 88.34	4
32	Mervyn King 99.98	4
33	Darius Labanauskas 99.24	6
16	Chris Dobey 103.50	5
49	William O'Connor 96.06	6
17	Krzysztof Ratajski 87.91	6
48	Ron Meulenkamp 85.49	1
8	Gerwyn Price 89.74	6
57	Jason Lowe 94.02	3
25	Martin Schindler 95.60	6
40	Ian White 96.82	3
9	Brendan Dolan 96.30	6
56	Chas Barstow 94.42	2
24	Dave Chisnall 87.33	4
41	Ritchie Edhouse 84.64	6

Second round (best of 11 legs); 27 November
1	José de Sousa 92.31	6
33	Darius Labanauskas 94.74	5
49	William O'Connor 88.00	6
17	Krzysztof Ratajski 88.36	4
8	Gerwyn Price 106.65	6
25	Martin Schindler 95.13	1
9	Brendan Dolan 90.35	6
41	Ritchie Edhouse 89.40	3

Third round (best of 19 legs); 27 November
1	José de Sousa 93.89	10
49	William O'Connor 87.72	7
8	Gerwyn Price 95.48	8
9	Brendan Dolan 89.46	10

Quarter-finals (best of 19 legs); 28 November
1	José de Sousa 94.04	4
9	Brendan Dolan 94.75	10

==== Section 2 ====
First round (best of 11 legs); 26 November
4	Michael Smith 87.47	6
61	William Borland 92.31	3
29	Daryl Gurney 91.64	6
36	Alan Soutar 86.01	3
13	Callan Rydz 91.62	6
52	Mensur Suljović 77.95	1
20	James Wade 82.55	6
45	Ricky Evans 77.56	1
5	Ryan Searle 86.73	6
60	Simon Whitlock 87.05	5
28	Ryan Joyce 88.98	6
37	Luke Woodhouse 89.36	4
12	Rob Cross 96.20	6
53	Jermaine Wattimena 89.90	2
21	Nathan Aspinall 100.49	6
44	Jeff Smith 89.81	2

Second round (best of 11 legs); 27 November
4	Michael Smith 96.11	5
29	Daryl Gurney 92.44	6
13	Callan Rydz 100.10	5
20	James Wade 100.49	6
5	Ryan Searle 86.87	6
28	Ryan Joyce 84.40	5
12	Rob Cross 97.76	6
21	Nathan Aspinall 97.86	4

Third round (best of 19 legs); 27 November
29	Daryl Gurney 104.30	10
20	James Wade 100.11	7
5	Ryan Searle 95.60	10
12	Rob Cross 97.05	7

Quarter-finals (best of 19 legs); 28 November
29	Daryl Gurney 101.71	9
5	Ryan Searle 101.26	10

=== Bottom half ===
==== Section 3 ====
First round (best of 11 legs); 26 November
2	Peter Wright 99.13	6
63	Keane Barry 99.24	4
31	Adrian Lewis 97.34	6
34	Kim Huybrechts 97.57	3
15	Damon Heta 91.01	6
50	Steve Lennon 87.05	2
18	Gabriel Clemens 88.93	6
47	Steve Beaton 86.52	5
7	Michael van Gerwen 97.14	6
58	Kevin Doets 94.26	3
26	Raymond van Barneveld 103.99	6
39	Maik Kuivenhoven 95.31	1
10	Dirk van Duijvenbode 105.04	5
55	Ryan Meikle 108.76	6
23	Stephen Bunting 92.32	5
42	Gary Anderson 87.88	6

Second round (best of 11 legs); 27 November
2	Peter Wright 94.56	6
31	Adrian Lewis 89.68	5
15	Damon Heta 92.37	6
18	Gabriel Clemens 82.09	2
7	Michael van Gerwen 95.62	6
26	Raymond van Barneveld 93.40	3
55	Ryan Meikle 84.00	2
42	Gary Anderson 86.37	6

Third round (best of 19 legs); 27 November
2	Peter Wright 93.25	10
15	Damon Heta 90.67	8
7	Michael van Gerwen 95.06	10
42	Gary Anderson 91.13	6

Quarter-finals (best of 19 legs); 28 November
2	Peter Wright 98.80	10
7	Michael van Gerwen 101.64	6

==== Section 4 ====
First round (best of 11 legs); 26 November
3	Jonny Clayton 89.60	6
62	Alan Tabern 82.81	4
30	Scott Mitchell 92.10	6
35	Martijn Kleermaker 88.22	5
14	Ross Smith 98.15	6
51	Rusty-Jake Rodriguez 94.43	2
19	Luke Humphries 93.78	6
46	Jason Heaver 84.20	4
6	Joe Cullen 99.50	5
59	Andy Boulton 100.86	6
27	Vincent van der Voort 85.18	6
Alt/65	Jelle Klaasen 83.66	4
11	Dimitri Van den Bergh 96.50	6
54	Madars Razma 94.77	3
22	Danny Noppert 101.33	6
43	Rowby-John Rodriguez 85.53	2

Second round (best of 11 legs); 27 November
3	Jonny Clayton 87.55	6
30	Scott Mitchell 75.44	0
14	Ross Smith 95.11	5
19	Luke Humphries 96.75	6
59	Andy Boulton 90.17	5
27	Vincent van der Voort 96.96	6
11	Dimitri Van den Bergh 92.59	2
22	Danny Noppert 96.02	6

Third round (best of 19 legs); 27 November
3	Jonny Clayton 96.41	10
19	Luke Humphries 96.97	9
27	Vincent van der Voort 98.56	10
22	Danny Noppert 93.91	7

Quarter-finals (best of 19 legs); 28 November
3	Jonny Clayton 89.60	10
27	Vincent van der Voort 82.81	3
