= Hugh Foulkes =

Welsh footballer

Personal information
- Full name: Hugh Edward Foulkes
- Date of birth: 13 April 1909
- Place of birth: Llandudno, Wales
- Date of death: 1981 (aged 71–72)
- Height: 5 ft 9 in (1.75 m)
- Position: Left back

Senior career*
Years	Team	Apps	(Gls)
- Llandudno
1931–1937	West Bromwich Albion	15	(0)
1937–1938	Guildford City		
1938–1939	Darlington (Note: Foulkes also made three appearances for Darlington in the 1939–40 Football League season abandoned when the Second World War began. Joyce's Football League Players' Records counts these matches in its appearance data, although most statistical sources do not.)	35	(1)

International career
1931	Wales	1	(0)
- * Club domestic league appearances and goals

Hugh Edward Foulkes (13 April 1909 – 1981) was a Wales international footballer who played as a left back. He made his only senior international appearance in a 4–0 defeat to Ireland at Windsor Park, Belfast, on 5 December 1931. He played in the Football League for West Bromwich Albion and Darlington in the 1930s. He also played for Welsh club Llandudno and in the Southern League for Guildford City.

His great-grandson Edward Foulkes was named after him and is a professional darts player.
