= 2018 European Darts Matchplay =

Tournament information
- Dates: 29 June–1 July 2018
- Venue: Edel-optics.de Arena
- Location: Hamburg, Germany
- Organisation(s): Professional Darts Corporation (PDC)
- Format: Legs
- Prize fund: £135,000
- Winner's share: £25,000
- Nine-dart finish: Michael van Gerwen
- High checkout: 160 Vincent van der Voort; Kim Huybrechts

Champion(s)
- (Netherlands) Michael van Gerwen

The 2018 European Darts Matchplay was the ninth of thirteen PDC European Tour events on the 2018 PDC Pro Tour. The tournament took place at the Edel-optics.de Arena, Hamburg, Germany from 29 June–1 July 2018. It featured a field of 48 players and £135,000 in prize money, with £25,000 going to the winner.

Michael van Gerwen was the defending champion after defeating Mensur Suljović 6–3 in the previous year's final, and he retained his title by defeating William O'Connor 8–2 in the final.

Van Gerwen also threw the first European Tour nine-dart finish in over 5 years against Ryan Joyce in the second round.

== Prize money ==
This is how the prize money is divided:

Stage (num. of players)		Prize money
Winner	(1)	£25,000
Runner-up	(1)	£10,000
Semi-finalists	(2)	£6,000
Quarter-finalists	(4)	£4,000
Third round losers	(8)	£3,000
Second round losers	(16)	£2,000
First round losers	(16)	£1,000
Total	£135,000	

Prize money will count towards the PDC Order of Merit, the ProTour Order of Merit and the European Tour Order of Merit, with one exception: should a seeded player lose in the second round (last 32), their prize money will not count towards any Orders of Merit, although they still receive the full prize money payment.

== Qualification and format ==
The top 16 entrants from the PDC ProTour Order of Merit on 8 June will automatically qualify for the event and will be seeded in the second round.

The remaining 32 places will go to players from five qualifying events – 16 from the UK Qualifier (held in Wigan on 15 June), 8 from the West/South European Qualifier (held on 28 June), 6 from the Host Nation Qualifier (held on 28 June), 1 from the Nordic & Baltic Qualifier (held on 25 May) and 1 from the East European Qualifier (held on 25 February).

Peter Wright, who would have been the number 2 seed, withdrew from the tournament prior to the draw. James Wilson, the highest-ranked qualifier, was promoted to 16th seed. Jim Brown also withdrew prior to the draw. Two extra places were made available in the Host Nation Qualifier.

The following players will take part in the tournament:

Top 16
1. (Netherlands) Michael van Gerwen (champion)
2. (England) Michael Smith (second round)
3. (England) Rob Cross (second round)
4. (Northern Ireland) Daryl Gurney (third round)
5. (England) Joe Cullen (third round)
6. (Austria) Mensur Suljović (quarter-finals)
7. (Wales) Jonny Clayton (second round)
8. (England) Ian White (quarter-finals)
9. (England) Darren Webster (third round)
10. (Wales) Gerwyn Price (quarter-finals)
11. (England) Mervyn King (second round)
12. (Australia) Simon Whitlock (second round)
13. (England) Stephen Bunting (semi-finals)
14. (Belgium) Kim Huybrechts (third round)
15. (England) Steve Beaton (second round)
16. (England) James Wilson (second round)

UK Qualifier
- (Wales) Robert Owen (first round)
- (England) Michael Barnard (first round)
- (Scotland) Jamie Bain (first round)
- (England) Martin Atkins (first round)
- (England) Keegan Brown (first round)
- (England) Darren Johnson (first round)
- (England) Paul Rowley (third round)
- (England) Justin Pipe (quarter-finals)
- (England) Luke Humphries (second round)
- (England) Andy Boulton (semi-finals)
- (England) Ryan Joyce (second round)
- (England) Chris Dobey (second round)
- (Republic of Ireland) William O'Connor (runner-up)
- (Scotland) Robert Thornton (third round)
- (England) Mark Wilson (first round)
- (England) Jason Lowe (third round)

West/South European Qualifier
- (Spain) Cristo Reyes (first round)
- (Netherlands) Vincent van der Voort (first round)
- (Belgium) Ronny Huybrechts (first round)
- (Belgium) Mike De Decker (first round)
- (Netherlands) Dirk van Duijvenbode (first round)
- (Netherlands) Jermaine Wattimena (first round)
- (Netherlands) Mario Robbe (first round)
- (Netherlands) Jelle Klaasen (third round)

Host Nation Qualifier
- (Germany) Max Hopp (second round)
- (Germany) René Eidams (first round)
- (Germany) Robert Marijanović (second round)
- (Germany) Martin Schindler (second round)
- (Germany) Dragutin Horvat (first round)
- (Germany) Maik Langendorf (second round)

Nordic & Baltic Qualifier
- (Lithuania) Darius Labanauskas (second round)

East European Qualifier
- (Russia) Boris Koltsov (second round)

== Draw ==
First round (best of 11 legs); 29 June
(England) Mark Wilson 75.80	1
(England) Ryan Joyce 87.05	6
(Scotland) Robert Thornton 80.22	6
(Germany) René Eidams 80.91	4
(Netherlands) Dirk van Duijvenbode 81.39	4
(Germany) Max Hopp 84.25	6
(England) Luke Humphries 88.60	6
(Belgium) Ronny Huybrechts 88.24	5
(Germany) Martin Schindler 92.87	6
(Netherlands) Mario Robbe 78.53	1
(Netherlands) Vincent van der Voort 93.64	3
(England) Justin Pipe 88.68	6
(Germany) Robert Marijanović 101.28	6
(Netherlands) Jermaine Wattimena 93.40	3
(Belgium) Mike De Decker 82.27	2
(Lithuania) Darius Labanauskas 86.36	6
(Netherlands) Jelle Klaasen 95.26	6
(Germany) Dragutin Horvat 91.82	3
(Spain) Cristo Reyes 90.47	4
(England) Andy Boulton 86.35	6
(England) Jason Lowe 95.62	6
(England) Keegan Brown 100.27	5
(Germany) Maik Langendorf 89.92	6
(England) Michael Barnard 80.75	1
(Wales) Robert Owen 92.24	2
(Russia) Boris Koltsov 97.39	6
(England) Darren Johnson 89.46	3
(England) Paul Rowley 90.57	6
(Republic of Ireland) William O'Connor 101.68	6
(England) Martin Atkins 89.50	1
(Scotland) Jamie Bain 86.08	1
(England) Chris Dobey 88.08	6

Second round (best of 11 legs); 30 June
1	(Netherlands) Michael van Gerwen 104.87	6
(England) Ryan Joyce 91.84	2
16	(England) James Wilson 88.72	5
(Scotland) Robert Thornton 86.46	6
8	(England) Ian White 85.73	6
(Germany) Max Hopp 76.97	2
9	(England) Darren Webster 86.34	6
(England) Luke Humphries 88.78	3
5	(England) Joe Cullen 83.66	6
(Germany) Martin Schindler 90.46	3
12	(Australia) Simon Whitlock 94.70	3
(England) Justin Pipe 88.95	6
4	(Northern Ireland) Daryl Gurney 85.62	6
(Germany) Robert Marijanović 84.57	5
13	(England) Stephen Bunting 88.50	6
(Lithuania) Darius Labanauskas 88.18	5
2	(England) Michael Smith 94.88	4
(Netherlands) Jelle Klaasen 93.89	6
15	(England) Steve Beaton 87.72	4
(England) Andy Boulton 89.56	6
7	(Wales) Jonny Clayton 85.60	5
(England) Jason Lowe 86.18	6
10	(Wales) Gerwyn Price 88.75	6
(Germany) Maik Langendorf 80.94	3
6	(Austria) Mensur Suljović 90.51	6
(Russia) Boris Koltsov 84.81	3
11	(England) Mervyn King 94.30	4
(England) Paul Rowley 91.83	6
3	(England) Rob Cross 98.98	4
(Republic of Ireland) William O'Connor 94.45	6
14	(Belgium) Kim Huybrechts 87.62	6
(England) Chris Dobey 88.16	4

Third round (best of 11 legs); 1 July
1	(Netherlands) van Gerwen 101.33	6
(Scotland) Thornton 83.70	1
8	(England) White 98.60	6
9	(England) Webster 92.82	2
5	(England) Cullen 92.64	4
(England) Pipe 92.44	6
4	(Northern Ireland) Gurney 95.88	5
13	(England) Bunting 95.00	6
(Netherlands) Klaasen 78.19	1
(England) Boulton 92.44	6
(England) Lowe 93.44	2
10	(Wales) Price 98.82	6
6	(Austria) Suljović 104.60	6
(England) Rowley 92.39	2
(Republic of Ireland) O'Connor 90.27	6
14	(Belgium) K. Huybrechts 85.33	5

Quarter-finals (best of 11 legs); 1 July
1	(Netherlands) van Gerwen 104.82	6
8	(England) White 94.31	4
(England) Pipe 87.45	3
13	(England) Bunting 92.05	6
(England) Boulton 85.55	6
10	(Wales) Price 87.31	5
6	(Austria) Suljović 101.28	3
(Republic of Ireland) O'Connor 96.35	6

Semi-finals (best of 13 legs); 1 July
1	(Netherlands) van Gerwen 99.55	7
13	(England) Bunting 94.04	4
(England) Boulton 85.89	3
(Republic of Ireland) O'Connor 92.30	7

Final (best of 15 legs); 1 July
1	(Netherlands) van Gerwen 105.17	8
(Republic of Ireland) O'Connor 93.92	2
