= Edward Foulkes =

Japanese darts player

Personal information
- Full name: Edward Shoji Foulkes エドワード 昌司 ファウルクス
- Born: 24 February 1990 (age 36) Naha, Japan
- Home town: Nagoya, Japan

Sport
- Sport: Darts
- Playing since: 2005
- Darts: 21 Gram Dynasty
- Laterality: Right-handed
- Walk-on music: "Pump Up the Jam" by Technotronic or "It's My Life" by Bon Jovi

Organisation (see split in darts)
- PDC: 2020–

PDC premier events – best performances
- World Championship: Last 64: 2021

Other tournament wins
- Years
PDJ Japan Championship	2020

Edward Shoji Foulkes (エドワード 昌司 ファウルクス, Foulkes S. Edward; born 24 February 1990) is a Japanese-Welsh professional darts player, who currently plays in Professional Darts Corporation tournaments. He is also known as a soft tip darts professional. Foulkes was born to a Welsh father, and a Japanese mother.

Foulkes's main occupation is music, and he is also a restaurant manager. He plays the Japanese folk instrument shamisen and sings.

Foulkes was named after his great-grandfather Hugh Edward Foulkes, a professional football player, who made one appearance for the Wales national team in 1931 while also playing in the Football League. His grandfather, also Hugh Edward Foulkes was also a professional sportsman; a golfer who played at Llandudno golf course.

== Darts career ==
Foulkes began playing darts at the age of 15 at his family-run pub in Okinawa, Japan.

=== PDC ===
He won the 2020 Japanese Championship, qualifying him to compete at the 2021 PDC World Darts Championship. He won his first round match at that championship against Mike De Decker with a 3–0 win.

== World Championship results ==
=== PDC ===
- 2021: Second round (lost to Brendan Dolan 1–3)
