= Amit Gilitwala =

Indian darts player

Personal information
- Nickname: "The Shakti"
- Born: 11 October 1995 (age 31) Surat, India

Sport
- Sport: Darts
- Playing since: 2011
- Darts: 24g Unicorn
- Laterality: Right-handed
- Walk-on music: "Jai Ho" by Allah Rakha Rahman

Organisation (see split in darts)
- BDO: 2012–2018
- PDC: 2018–2023
- WDF: 2012–2018

PDC premier events – best performances
- World Championship: Last 96: 2021

Other tournament wins
- Years
India Ch'ship	2011

Amit Gilitwala (born 11 October 1995) is an Indian former professional darts player who has played in the Professional Darts Corporation (PDC) events. He is an Indian Champion and first player from India who played at the PDC World Youth Championship. He represented his country during the PDC World Cup of Darts, WDF World Cup and WDF Asia-Pacific Cup. His biggest achievement to date was a start in the 2021 PDC World Darts Championship.

== Career ==
In 2011, Gilitwala won the Indian Championship just a few months after he started playing darts, by beating Ankit Goenka in the final by a 4–3 scoreline in legs. In the same year, he took part in the 2011 WDF World Cup, competing in the youth competitions. In the singles competition, he was eliminated in the group-stage, after two losses against Jake Jones and Max Hopp. In the mixed pairs competition he played for India with Amita-Rani Ahir, but they lost in the group-stage.

A year later, he was selected by the national federation to represent India during the WDF Asia-Pacific Cup. In the pairs and team competition he was eliminated, taking the last place in the group. In the singles competition, he was eliminated in the group-stage. In 2014, Gilitwala took part in the PDC Development Tour competition and qualified for the 2014 PDC World Youth Championship. In the first round match, he lost to Jake Patchett by 0–6 in legs.

In June 2014, he represented his home country at the 2014 PDC World Cup of Darts together with Nitin Kumar. In the first round match they competed against Belgium (Kim Huybrechts and Ronny Huybrechts), but lost by 0–5 in legs. After a longer break with international starts, Gilitwala took part in the PDC Q-School in 2018, but was not successful there. In 2021, he was nominated by Indian Darts Federation for the 2021 PDC World Darts Championship. In the first round match, he lost to Steve West by 0–3 in sets. He played an average over 80 points, but had problem on the doubles.

In 2026, he played in the World ParaDarts (WPD) & World Disability Darts Association (WDDA) since August.

== World Championship results ==
=== PDC ===
- 2021: First round (lost to Steve West 0–3) (sets)

== Performance timeline ==
Tournament	2014	2015	2016	2017	2018	2019	2020	2021	2022	2023
PDC Ranked televised events
World Championship	DNQ							1R	DNQ	
PDC Non-ranked televised events
World Cup of Darts	1R	DNQ								RR
World Youth Championship	1R	DNQ								
Career statistics
Year-end ranking (PDC)	–	–	–	–	–	–	125	–	–	
