= Martijn Kleermaker =

Dutch darts player

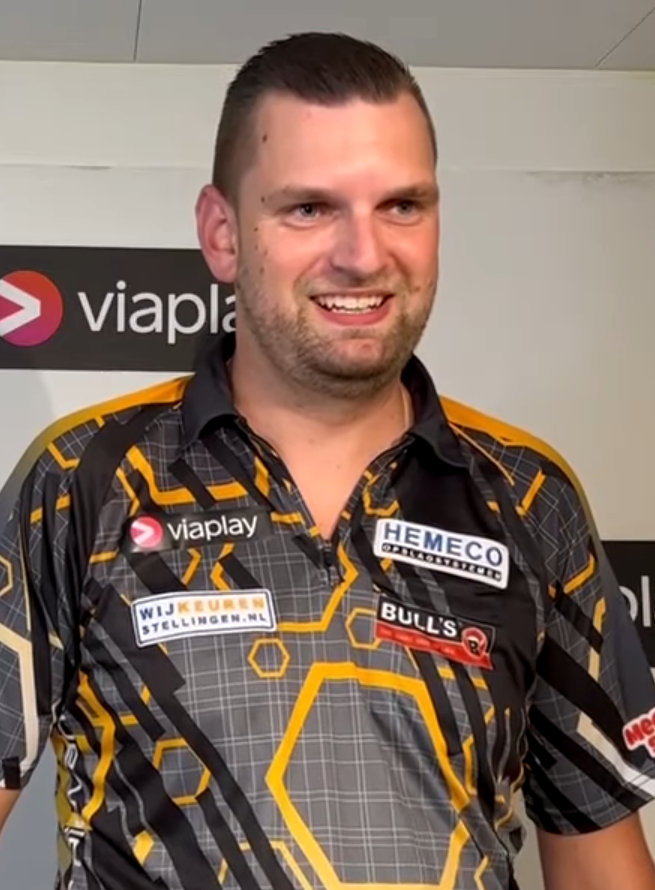
- Kleermaker in 2022

Personal information
- Nickname: "The Dutch Giant"
- Born: 19 February 1991 (age 35) Harderwijk, Netherlands
- Home town: Hierden, Netherlands

Sport
- Sport: Darts
- Playing since: 2009
- Darts: 25g Bull's NL Signature
- Laterality: Right-handed
- Walk-on music: "Giant" by Calvin Harris and Rag'n'Bone Man

Organisation (see split in darts)
- BDO: 2014–2020
- PDC: 2020–2023 (Tour Card: 2020–2023)

WDF major events – best performances
- World Championship: Last 16: 2020
- World Masters: Last 32: 2017
- World Trophy: Last 16: 2019
- Finder Masters: Last 24 Group: 2016, 2018
- Dutch Open: Semi Final: 2025

PDC premier events – best performances
- World Championship: Last 16: 2022
- World Grand Prix: Last 32: 2021
- UK Open: Last 16: 2021
- Grand Slam: Last 32: 2023
- European Championship: Last 16: 2020
- PC Finals: Last 64: 2020, 2021

Other tournament wins
- Years
| Luxembourg Open | 2019 |
| Welsh Open | 2019 |
| Westfries Masters | 2019 |
| Westfries Open | 2019 |

Martijn Kleermaker
Medal record

Men's Darts

Representing Netherlands

WDF World Cup
| Gold medal – first place | 2019 Cluj | Men's overall |
| Bronze medal – third place | 2019 Cluj | Men's singles |
| Bronze medal – third place | 2019 Cluj | Men's pairs |
| Bronze medal – third place | 2019 Cluj | Men's team |

WDF Europe Cup
| Silver medal – second place | 2018 Budapest | Men's pairs |
| Silver medal – second place | 2018 Budapest | Men's team |
| Silver medal – second place | 2018 Budapest | Men's overall |

Martijn Kleermaker (born 19 February 1991) is a Dutch former professional darts player who competed in British Darts Organisation (BDO) and Professional Darts Corporation (PDC) events.

== PDC ==
Kleermaker announced that he intended to compete at Q School 2020, speaking to RTL 7 saying that the 2019 World Masters was a "catastrophe".

Kleermaker won a PDC Tour Card for the first time at European Q School in 2020. He played on the ProTour since 2020. In his first year in PDC, he took part in 2020 UK Open, where he lost in the first round. Martijn qualified for three out of four European Tour events in 2020 and secured his spot in 2020 European Championship, where he defeated Rob Cross 6–3 in the first round, losing to Devon Petersen 8–10 in the second round. From 39th place on Players Championship Order of Merit Kleermaker also qualified for 2020 Players Championship Finals, where he lost in the deciding leg 5–6 to Gabriel Clemens in the first round. Because of a positive COVID-19–test Kleermaker had to withdraw from the 2021 PDC World Darts Championship. After the first year with the Tour card, he was 74th in the PDC Order of Merit.

In 2021, Kleermaker made it to the last 16 in 2021 UK Open, winning over Wayne Jones, Martin Schindler, Jamie Hughes and Callan Rydz, losing to Luke Humphries 4–10. Later on in the year Kleermaker made his debut on 2021 World Grand Prix, where he lost 0–2 on sets to Mervyn King. From 35th place on Players Championship Order of Merit he qualified for 2021 Players Championship Finals, losing in the deciding leg 5–6 to Scott Mitchell.

After withdrawal in 2021, Kleermaker debuted on 2022 PDC World Darts Championship and made it to last 16 after wins over John Michael, Simon Whitlock and Joe Cullen, then losing 0–4 on sets to James Wade. After two years with the Tour card, he placed 40th in PDC Order of Merit, securing his place for 2022.

In 2022 UK Open, Kleermaker was seeded in the third round, where he lost to Jason Heaver 5–6.

Following the 2023 Grand Slam of Darts, Kleermaker announced that he would be handing in his tour card at the end of the year, citing his desire to spend more time with his children as the driving force behind his decision.

== World Championship results ==
=== BDO ===
- 2020: Second round (lost to Paul Hogan 1–4)

=== PDC ===
- 2022: Fourth round (lost to James Wade 0–4)
- 2023: Second round (lost to Chris Dobey 0–3)

== Performance timeline ==
=== BDO ===
| Tournament | 2016 | 2017 | 2018 | 2019 | 2020 |
|---|---|---|---|---|---|
| World Championship | DNP | DNQ | | | 2R |
| World Trophy | DNP | | | 2R | NH |
| Winmau World Masters | 2R | 5R | 4R | DNP | NH |
| Zuiderduin Masters | RR | DNQ | RR | DNQ | NH |

=== PDC ===
| Tournament | 2020 | 2021 | 2022 | 2023 |
|---|---|---|---|---|
PDC Ranked televised events
| World Championship | DNP | WD | 4R | 2R |
| UK Open | 1R | 6R | 3R | 5R |
| World Grand Prix | DNQ | 1R | DNQ | |
| European Championship | 2R | DNQ | | |
| Grand Slam | DNQ | | | RR |
| Players Championship Finals | 1R | 1R | 2R | DNQ |
Career statistics
| Year-end ranking | 74 | 40 | 40 | 65 |

==== European Tour ====
| Tournament | 2020 | 2021 | 2022 | 2023 |
|---|---|---|---|---|
| Belgian Championship | 3R | Not held | | |
| German Championship | DNQ | NH | 2R | DNQ |
| European Grand Prix | 3R | NH | 1R | 2R |
| International Open | 2R | NH | DNQ | |
| Gibraltar Trophy | NH | 1R | DNQ | NH |
| Czech Open | NH | | 2R | 2R |
| Dutch Championship | NH | | 1R | DNQ |
| German Open | NH | | 1R | DNQ |

==== Players Championships ====
| Season | 1 | 2 | 3 | 4 | 5 | 6 | 7 | 8 | 9 | 10 | 11 | 12 | 13 | 14 | 15 | 16 | 17 | 18 | 19 | 20 | 21 | 22 | 23 | 24 | 25 | 26 | 27 | 28 | 29 | 30 |
|---|---|---|---|---|---|---|---|---|---|---|---|---|---|---|---|---|---|---|---|---|---|---|---|---|---|---|---|---|---|---|
| 2020 | BAR; 3R | BAR; 2R | WIG; 2R | WIG; 1R | WIG; 1R | WIG; 1R | BAR; 3R | BAR; 1R | MIL; 3R | MIL; QF | MIL; 2R | MIL; 3R | MIL; 3R | NIE; 3R | NIE; 1R | NIE; 1R | NIE; 1R | NIE; 3R | COV; 1R | COV; 3R | COV; 3R | COV; 1R | COV; 1R | | | | | | | |
| 2021 | BOL; 1R | BOL; 1R | BOL; 1R | BOL; 1R | MIL; 1R | MIL; 2R | MIL; 1R | MIL; 1R | NIE; 3R | NIE; 1R | NIE; F | NIE; 4R | MIL; QF | MIL; 1R | MIL; 3R | MIL; 1R | COV; 3R | COV; 3R | COV; 1R | COV; 3R | BAR; 3R | BAR; 4R | BAR; 3R | BAR; 1R | BAR; 1R | BAR; 3R | BAR; 1R | BAR; 1R | BAR; 2R | BAR; 1R |
| 2022 | BAR; 1R | BAR; 1R | WIG; 1R | WIG; 1R | BAR; 1R | BAR; 4R | NIE; 3R | NIE; 3R | BAR; 2R | BAR; 2R | BAR; 1R | BAR; 2R | BAR; QF | WIG; 1R | WIG; 4R | NIE; 1R | NIE; 1R | BAR; 1R | BAR; 2R | BAR; 2R | BAR; 1R | BAR; 4R | BAR; 1R | BAR; 1R | BAR; 1R | BAR; 2R | BAR; 2R | BAR; 1R | BAR; 3R | BAR; 2R |
| 2023 | BAR; 2R | BAR; 1R | BAR; 1R | BAR; 1R | BAR; 1R | BAR; 2R | HIL; 1R | HIL; 1R | WIG; 2R | WIG; QF | LEI; 1R | LEI; 2R | HIL; 1R | HIL; 3R | LEI; 3R | LEI; 2R | HIL; 1R | HIL; 1R | BAR; 3R | BAR; 1R | BAR; 2R | BAR; 2R | BAR; 1R | BAR; 1R | BAR; QF | BAR; 1R | BAR; 1R | BAR; 2R | BAR; 1R | BAR; 1R |
