= 2020 European Darts Grand Prix =

2020 edition of European Darts Grand Prix

Tournament information
- Dates: 16–18 October 2020
- Venue: Glaspalast
- Location: Sindelfingen, Germany
- Organisation(s): Professional Darts Corporation (PDC)
- Format: Legs
- Prize fund: £140,000 ($164,992)
- Winner's share: £25,000 ($29,462)
- High checkout: 170; Joe Cullen; Maik Kuivenhoven; Michael van Gerwen

Champion(s)
- José de Sousa

The 2020 European Darts Grand Prix was the third PDC European Tour event on the 2020 PDC Pro Tour. The tournament took place at the Glaspalast, Sindelfingen, Germany from 16–18 October 2020. It featured a field of 48 players and £140,000 in prize money, with £25,000 going to the winner.

Ian White was the defending champion, after defeating Peter Wright 8–7 in the 2019 final. However, he lost 7–6 to José de Sousa in the semi-finals.

De Sousa won his first European Tour title after beating Michael van Gerwen 8–4 in the final.

The tournament was postponed from its original date of 20–22 March 2020 due to the COVID-19 pandemic in Germany.

== Prize money ==
This is how the prize money is divided, with the prize money being unchanged from the 2019 European Tour:

Stage (num. of players)		Prize money
Winner	(1)	£25,000
Runner-up	(1)	£10,000
Semi-finalists	(2)	£6,500
Quarter-finalists	(4)	£5,000
Third round losers	(8)	£3,000
Second round losers	(16)	£2,000*
First round losers	(16)	£1,000*
Total	£140,000	

- Seeded players who lose in the second round and Host Nation invitees who lose in the first round do not receive this prize money on any Orders of Merit.

== Qualification and format ==
The top 16 entrants from the PDC ProTour Order of Merit on 4 February automatically qualified for the event and were seeded in the second round.

The remaining 32 places went to players from four qualifying events and to two invitees – 24 from the Tour Card Holder Qualifier (held on 14 February), two from the Associate Member Qualifier (held on 15 October), two from the Host Nation Qualifier (held on 15 October), one from the Nordic & Baltic Associate Member Qualifier (held on 12 October 2019), and one from the East European Associate Member Qualifier (held on 8 February).

The two highest ranked German players on the ProTour Order of Merit as of the 14 February cut-off date also qualified.

Seeded players Peter Wright & Adrian Lewis; and unseeded players Ryan Joyce & Darren Webster all withdrew prior to the draw. The highest ranked qualifiers José de Sousa & Vincent van der Voort became seeds, and the number of places available from the Host Nation Qualifier increased from two to six.

The following players will take part in the tournament:

Top 16

1. (Netherlands) Michael van Gerwen (runner-up)
2. (Wales) Gerwyn Price (third round)
3. (England) Ian White (semi-finals)
4. (Poland) Krzysztof Ratajski (second round)
5. (Austria) Mensur Suljović (semi-finals)
6. (Northern Ireland) Daryl Gurney (second round)
7. (England) Dave Chisnall (second round)
8. (England) James Wade (third round)
9. (England) Nathan Aspinall (quarter-finals)
10. (England) Joe Cullen (third round)
11. (England) Glen Durrant (third round)
12. (England) Jamie Hughes (third round)
13. (England) Rob Cross (quarter-finals)
14. (England) Michael Smith (third round)
15. (Portugal) José de Sousa (champion)
16. (Netherlands) Vincent van der Voort (third round)

Tour Card Qualifier
- (South Africa) Devon Petersen (second round)
- (Republic of Ireland) Steve Lennon (second round)
- (England) Adam Hunt (second round)
- (England) Mervyn King (second round)
- (England) Jason Lowe (first round)
- (Germany) Steffen Siepmann (first round)
- (Wales) Jonathan Worsley (first round)
- (Lithuania) Darius Labanauskas (quarter-finals)
- (Republic of Ireland) William O'Connor (second round)
- (Netherlands) Derk Telnekes (second round)
- (Scotland) John Henderson (first round)
- (Netherlands) Maik Kuivenhoven (quarter-finals)
- (Netherlands) Martijn Kleermaker (third round)
- (England) Harry Ward (first round)
- (Latvia) Madars Razma (first round)
- (England) Scott Waites (second round)
- (Australia) Damon Heta (first round)
- (England) Luke Woodhouse (first round)
- (England) Chris Dobey (first round)
- (Belgium) Kim Huybrechts (second round)

Associate Member Qualifier
- (England) David Evans (second round)
- (Switzerland) Stefan Bellmont (first round)

Highest Ranked Germans
- (Germany) Gabriel Clemens (second round)
- (Germany) Max Hopp (second round)

Host Nation Qualifier
- (Germany) Ricardo Pietreczko (second round)
- (Germany) Michael Unterbuchner (first round)
- (Germany) Markus Buffler (first round)
- (Germany) Kai Gotthardt (first round)
- (Germany) Nico Kurz (second round)
- (Germany) Robert Marijanović (first round)

Nordic & Baltic Qualifier
- (Lithuania) Mindaugas Barauskas (first round)

East European Qualifier
- (Croatia) Pero Ljubić (first round)

== Draw ==
First round 16 October (best of 11 legs)
(England) Mervyn King 99.15	6
(Lithuania) Mindaugas Barauskas 86.71	5
(Germany) Max Hopp 97.57	6
(Croatia) Pero Ljubić 86.46	4
(Germany) Steffen Siepmann 88.62	3
(Germany) Gabriel Clemens 103.93	6
(England) Chris Dobey 84.21	3
(Republic of Ireland) William O'Connor 86.24	6
(Germany) Markus Buffler 73.51	3
(Netherlands) Martijn Kleermaker 79.59	6
(England) Adam Hunt 100.89	6
(Australia) Damon Heta 88.18	1
(Germany) Kai Gotthardt 94.10	3
(England) David Evans 100.29	6
(Republic of Ireland) Steve Lennon 96.64	6
(Latvia) Madars Razma 94.74	3
(England) Harry Ward 71.89	1
(South Africa) Devon Petersen 92.68	6
(Germany) Ricardo Pietreczko 89.65	6
(England) Luke Woodhouse 86.68	1
(Lithuania) Darius Labanauskas 87.53	6
(Germany) Michael Unterbuchner 89.51	4
(Belgium) Kim Huybrechts 91.08	6
(Scotland) John Henderson 84.68	2
(England) Scott Waites 92.52	6
(England) Jason Lowe 96.21	5
(Netherlands) Derk Telnekes 83.18	6
(Germany) Robert Marijanović 81.10	3
(Netherlands) Maik Kuivenhoven 89.85	6
(Wales) Jonathan Worsley 81.30	4
(Germany) Nico Kurz 84.94	6
(Switzerland) Stefan Bellmont 80.85	5

Second round 17 October (best of 11 legs)
1	(Netherlands) Michael van Gerwen 94.78	6
(England) Mervyn King 88.01	1
16	(Netherlands) Vincent van der Voort 88.20	6
(Germany) Max Hopp 87.04	4
8	(England) James Wade 100.99	6
(Germany) Gabriel Clemens 100.58	4
9	(England) Nathan Aspinall 96.89	6
(Republic of Ireland) William O'Connor 90.53	1
4	(Poland) Krzysztof Ratajski 97.40	2
(Netherlands) Martijn Kleermaker 98.73	6
13	(England) Rob Cross 95.73	6
(England) Adam Hunt 91.73	5
5	(Austria) Mensur Suljović 105.43	6
(England) David Evans 94.03	3
12	(England) Jamie Hughes 87.93	6
(Republic of Ireland) Steve Lennon 94.09	5
2	(Wales) Gerwyn Price 95.47	6
(South Africa) Devon Petersen 87.74	2
15	(Portugal) José de Sousa 82.73	6
(Germany) Ricardo Pietreczko 73.53	0
7	(England) Dave Chisnall 93.95	3
(Lithuania) Darius Labanauskas 91.16	6
10	(England) Joe Cullen 94.89	6
(Belgium) Kim Huybrechts 88.01	3
3	(England) Ian White 91.89	6
(England) Scott Waites 89.85	2
14	(England) Michael Smith 103.66	6
(Netherlands) Derk Telnekes 80.14	0
6	(Northern Ireland) Daryl Gurney 91.94	5
(Netherlands) Maik Kuivenhoven 96.15	6
11	(England) Glen Durrant 90.49	6
(Germany) Nico Kurz 86.93	3

Third round 18 October (best of 11 legs)
1	(Netherlands) van Gerwen 89.01	6
16	(Netherlands) van der Voort 87.52	5
8	(England) Wade 91.26	2
9	(England) Aspinall 93.85	6
(Netherlands) Kleermaker 91.55	1
13	(England) Cross 101.38	6
5	(Austria) Suljović 92.15	6
12	(England) Hughes 87.48	5
2	(Wales) Price 92.87	3
15	(Portugal) de Sousa 88.94	6
(Lithuania) Labanauskas 84.74	6
10	(England) Cullen 79.60	2
3	(England) White 91.59	6
14	(England) Smith 90.56	2
(Netherlands) Kuivenhoven 90.63	6
11	(England) Durrant 90.29	3

Quarter-finals; 18 October (best of 11 legs)
1	(Netherlands) van Gerwen 99.65	6
9	(England) Aspinall 98.90	5
13	(England) Cross 81.37	0
5	(Austria) Suljović 96.97	6
15	(Portugal) de Sousa 98.09	6
(Lithuania) Labanauskas 95.58	4
3	(England) White 89.56	6
(Netherlands) Kuivenhoven 87.63	4

Semi-finals; 18 October (best of 13 legs)
1	(Netherlands) van Gerwen 96.96	7
5	(Austria) Suljović 95.30	1
15	(Portugal) de Sousa 99.60	7
3	(England) White 94.15	6

Final; 18 October (best of 15 legs)
1	(Netherlands) van Gerwen 92.43	4
15	(Portugal) de Sousa 105.79	8
