= Maik Kuivenhoven =

Dutch darts player (born 1988)

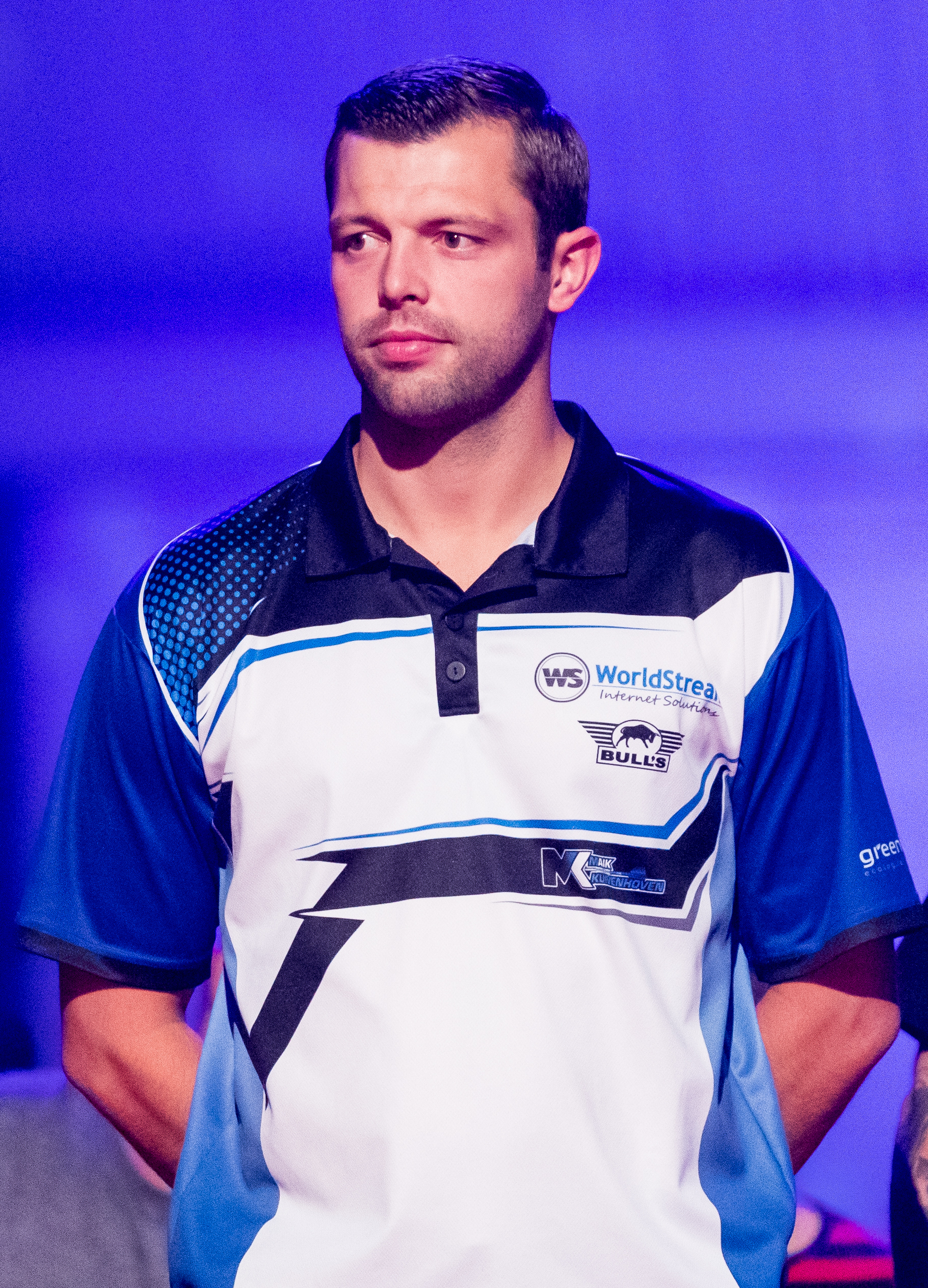
- Kuivenhoven in 2019

Personal information
- Born: 25 September 1988 (age 38) Naaldwijk, Netherlands

Sport
- Sport: Darts
- Playing since: 2017
- Darts: 25g Bull's NL Signature
- Laterality: Right-handed
- Walk-on music: "N-R-G" by G-Spott

Organisation (see split in darts)
- PDC: 2018–present (Tour Card: 2019–present)
- Current world ranking: (PDC) 71 (5 November 2026)

PDC premier events – best performances
- World Championship: Last 64: 2022
- UK Open: Last 64: 2022
- Grand Slam: Group Stage: 2026
- European Championship: Last 32: 2020
- PC Finals: Last 32: 2023
- World Series Finals: Last 16: 2021

Maik Kuivenhoven (born 25 September 1988) is a Dutch professional darts player who competes in Professional Darts Corporation (PDC) events. He contested his first PDC ranking final at Players Championship 22 in June 2026. He has reached one PDC European Tour quarter-final, reaching the last eight of the 2020 European Darts Grand Prix.

== Career ==
In 2018, Kuivenhoven qualified for his first PDC European Tour event, when he won one of the eight West/South European qualifying slots for the 2018 German Darts Open. He was defeated in the second round. In January 2019, he entered PDC European Q-School attempting to win a two-year Tour Card. He finished seventh on the Order of Merit to win the final card available.

In 2020, Kuivenhoven reached the quarter-finals of the 2020 European Darts Grand Prix before losing to Ian White.

At the end of 2022, Kuivenhoven was outside the top 64 of the Order of Merit but immediately regained his Tour Card at Q-School in January 2023.

Kuivenhoven qualified for the 2023 Players Championship Finals as the 51st seed; he reached the second round by defeating Krzysztof Ratajski before losing to Brendan Dolan in a deciding leg.

Kuivenhoven missed out on qualifying for the 2024 PDC World Championship by £1,000 on the Pro Tour Order of Merit, and failed to qualify for the 2025 edition by £500. This led to him finishing the 2024 season 75th on the Order of Merit, therefore losing his tour card.

Kuivenhoven regained his Tour Card at Q–School in January 2025. He reached his first PDC ranking final at Players Championship 22 in June 2026, where he lost 8–5 to Rob Cross.

== World Championship results ==
=== PDC ===
- 2021: First round (lost to Matthew Edgar 0–3)
- 2022: Second round (lost to James Wade 1–3)

== Performance timeline ==
Tournament	2019	2020	2021	2022	2023	2024	2025	2026
PDC Ranked televised events
World Championship	DNQ		1R	2R	Did not qualify			
World Masters	Did not qualify						Prel.	Prel.
UK Open	2R	3R	3R	4R	1R	3R	2R	2R
European Championship	DNQ	1R	Did not qualify					
Grand Slam	Did not qualify							RR
Players Championship Finals	DNQ	1R	1R	DNQ	2R	DNQ		
PDC Non-ranked televised events
World Series Finals	DNQ		2R	Did not qualify				1R
Career statistics
Season-end ranking	145	66	48	67	96	75	113	

=== PDC European Tour ===
Tournament	2018	2019	2020	2022	2023	2024	2025	2026
German Open	2R	DNQ	NH	DNQ		Not held		
European Matchplay	DNQ	1R	NH	DNQ		Not held		
European Grand Prix	DNQ		QF	Did not qualify				
International Open	DNQ		1R	Did not qualify				1R
European Open	Did not qualify			2R	1R	DNQ		1R
Austrian Open	DNQ		NH	DNQ	2R	Did not qualify		
Baltic Sea Open	Not held				DNQ	2R	DNQ	
German Championship	Did not qualify			NH	DNQ	1R	DNQ	NH
Flanders Trophy	Not held					1R	DNQ	
Czech Open	NH	DNQ	NH	DNQ		2R	1R	DNQ
Dutch Championship	DNQ	Not held		Did not qualify			1R	
European Trophy	DNQ	Not held					DNQ	1R
Hungarian Trophy	Not held			Did not qualify				1R
Swiss Trophy	Not held					DNQ		2R

=== PDC Players Championships ===
Season	1	2	3	4	5	6	7	8	9	10	11	12	13	14	15	16	17	18	19	20	21	22	23	24	25	26	27	28	29	30	31	32	33	34
2019	WIG; 2R	WIG; 2R	WIG; 1R	WIG; 1R	BAR; 1R	BAR; 3R	WIG; 1R	WIG; 1R	BAR; 1R	BAR; 1R	BAR; 1R	BAR; 1R	BAR; 1R	BAR; 1R	BAR; 1R	BAR; 1R	WIG; 1R	WIG; 3R	BAR; 1R	BAR; 1R	HIL; 1R	HIL; 2R	BAR; 2R	BAR; 3R	BAR; 1R	BAR; 1R	DUB; 1R	DUB; 2R	BAR; 3R	BAR; 1R				
2020	BAR; QF	BAR; 3R	WIG; 2R	WIG; QF	WIG; 1R	WIG; 1R	BAR; 1R	BAR; 2R	MIL; 1R	MIL; 4R	MIL; 1R	MIL; 2R	MIL; 2R	NIE; 1R	NIE; 1R	NIE; 1R	NIE; 2R	NIE; 2R	COV; 1R	COV; 1R	COV; 2R	COV; 1R	COV; 1R											
2021	BOL; 1R	BOL; 1R	BOL; 1R	BOL; 2R	MIL; 1R	MIL; 1R	MIL; 4R	MIL; 2R	NIE; 1R	NIE; 4R	NIE; 1R	NIE; 2R	MIL; 3R	MIL; 1R	MIL; 4R	MIL; 2R	COV; 4R	COV; SF	COV; 1R	COV; 2R	BAR; 1R	BAR; 2R	BAR; 4R	BAR; 1R	BAR; QF	BAR; 1R	BAR; 3R	BAR; 1R	BAR; 1R	BAR; 3R				
2022	BAR; 1R	BAR; 3R	WIG; 3R	WIG; 1R	BAR; 3R	BAR; 1R	NIE; 1R	NIE; 1R	BAR; 2R	BAR; 1R	BAR; 3R	BAR; 1R	BAR; 1R	WIG; QF	WIG; 2R	NIE; 1R	NIE; 2R	BAR; 1R	BAR; 3R	BAR; 1R	BAR; 1R	BAR; 1R	BAR; 2R	BAR; 1R	BAR; 2R	BAR; 1R	BAR; 1R	BAR; 1R	BAR; 1R	BAR; 1R				
2023	BAR; 2R	BAR; 1R	BAR; 1R	BAR; QF	BAR; 1R	BAR; 1R	HIL; 2R	HIL; 2R	WIG; 1R	WIG; 1R	LEI; 1R	LEI; 2R	HIL; 1R	HIL; 1R	LEI; 1R	LEI; 1R	HIL; 2R	HIL; 2R	BAR; 2R	BAR; 2R	BAR; 2R	BAR; 2R	BAR; 1R	BAR; 2R	BAR; 2R	BAR; 2R	BAR; QF	BAR; 2R	BAR; QF	BAR; 1R				
2024	WIG; 2R	WIG; 1R	LEI; 1R	LEI; 3R	HIL; 1R	HIL; 3R	LEI; 2R	LEI; 1R	HIL; 1R	HIL; 1R	HIL; 3R	HIL; 2R	MIL; 2R	MIL; 1R	MIL; 1R	MIL; 1R	MIL; 2R	MIL; 2R	MIL; 2R	WIG; 1R	WIG; SF	LEI; 1R	LEI; 3R	WIG; 1R	WIG; 1R	WIG; 1R	WIG; 1R	WIG; 1R	LEI; 2R	LEI; 1R				
2025	WIG; 1R	WIG; 1R	ROS; 1R	ROS; 4R	LEI; 3R	LEI; 1R	HIL; 2R	HIL; 1R	LEI; 1R	LEI; 1R	LEI; 3R	LEI; 2R	ROS; 1R	ROS; 4R	HIL; 2R	HIL; 1R	LEI; 1R	LEI; 1R	LEI; 2R	LEI; 2R	LEI; 1R	HIL; 2R	HIL; 2R	MIL; 1R	MIL; 1R	HIL; 2R	HIL; 1R	LEI; 3R	LEI; 1R	LEI; 1R	WIG; 2R	WIG; 3R	WIG; 2R	WIG; 3R
2026	HIL; 2R	HIL; 1R	WIG; 1R	WIG; 1R	LEI; 2R	LEI; 2R	LEI; 4R	LEI; 3R	WIG; 1R	WIG; 2R	MIL; 1R	MIL; 2R	HIL; SF	HIL; 4R	LEI; 2R	LEI; 2R	LEI; 4R	LEI; 2R	MIL; 2R	MIL; 1R	WIG; 1R	WIG; F	LEI; 1R	LEI; 2R	HIL; 3R	HIL; 1R	LEI; 1R	LEI; 2R	ROS; 3R	ROS; 1R	ROS; F	ROS; 3R	LEI; 2R	LEI; 1R

Performance Table Legend
W	Won the tournament	F	Finalist	SF	Semifinalist	QF	Quarterfinalist	#R; RR; Prel.	Lost in # round Round-robin; Preliminary round	DQ	Disqualified
DNQ	Did not qualify	DNP	Did not participate	WD	Withdrew	NH	Tournament not held	#R; RR; Prel.	Lost in # round Round-robin; Preliminary round	NYF	Not yet founded
