= 2020 European Championship (darts) =

2020 Unibet European Championship

Tournament information
- Dates: 29 October–1 November 2020
- Venue: König Pilsener Arena
- Location: Oberhausen
- Country: Germany
- Organisation(s): PDC
- Format: Legs
- Prize fund: £500,000
- Winner's share: £120,000
- Nine-dart finish: (Portugal) José de Sousa (first round)
- High checkout: 170 (Germany) Max Hopp (first round)

Champion(s)
- (Scotland) Peter Wright

The 2020 Unibet European Championship was the thirteenth edition of the Professional Darts Corporation's European Championship tournament, which saw the top players from the four European tour events compete against each other. The tournament took place from 29 October–1 November 2020 at the König Pilsener Arena in Oberhausen, Germany, in front of smaller, masked, socially distanced crowds, having been moved from its original venue of the Westfalenhallen in Dortmund.

Rob Cross was the defending champion after defeating Gerwyn Price 11–6 in the 2019 final. However, he was beaten 6–3 by Martijn Kleermaker in the first round, as was top seed Joe Cullen in another upset, who lost to William O'Connor by the same scoreline.

Peter Wright won the tournament for the first time with an 11–4 win over James Wade in the final.

José de Sousa hit a nine-darter in his first-round match with Jeffrey de Zwaan, which he won 6–3.

== Prize money ==
The 2020 European Championship has a total prize fund of £500,000, the same as its previous edition.

The following is the breakdown of the fund:

Position (no. of players)		Prize money (Total: £500,000)
Winner	(1)	£120,000
Runner-up	(1)	£60,000
Semi-finalists	(2)	£32,000
Quarter-finalists	(4)	£20,000
Last 16 (second round)	(8)	£10,000
Last 32 (first round)	(16)	£6,000

== Qualification ==
The 2020 tournament continued the new qualification system used in the two previous editions: the top 32 players from the European Tour Order of Merit qualified for the tournament. The Order of Merit is solely based on prize money won in the four European tour events during the season, reduced from the planned 13 due to the COVID-19 pandemic.

As with the previous tournaments, players were drawn in a fixed bracket by their seeded order with the top qualifier playing the 32nd, the second playing the 31st and so on.

Glen Durrant (who would've been 23rd seed) had to withdraw from the tournament after testing positive for COVID-19 the week before, allowing William O'Connor to enter the tournament as the 32nd seed.

The following players qualified for the tournament:

1. (England) Joe Cullen (first round)
2. (Wales) Gerwyn Price (second round)
3. (Portugal) José de Sousa (second round)
4. (South Africa) Devon Petersen (semi-finals)
5. (Netherlands) Michael van Gerwen (second round)
6. (England) Michael Smith (second round)
7. (Austria) Mensur Suljović (second round)
8. (England) Nathan Aspinall (second round)
9. (England) James Wade (runner-up)
10. (Poland) Krzysztof Ratajski (first round)
11. (Netherlands) Danny Noppert (first round)
12. (England) Mervyn King (first round)
13. (England) Rob Cross (first round)
14. (Wales) Jonny Clayton (semi-finals)
15. (Scotland) Peter Wright (champion)
16. (England) Jamie Hughes (second round)
17. (England) Dave Chisnall (first round)
18. (Germany) Gabriel Clemens (first round)
19. (Germany) Max Hopp (first round)
20. (Netherlands) Martijn Kleermaker (second round)
21. (England) Ian White (quarter-finals)
22. (Netherlands) Dirk van Duijvenbode (quarter-finals)
23. (England) Steve West (quarter-finals)
24. (Republic of Ireland) Steve Lennon (first round)
25. (Netherlands) Maik Kuivenhoven (first round)
26. (Northern Ireland) Daryl Gurney (first round)
27. (England) Ross Smith (first round)
28. (Lithuania) Darius Labanauskas (first round)
29. (England) Andy Hamilton (first round)
30. (Netherlands) Jeffrey de Zwaan (first round)
31. (Belgium) Kim Huybrechts (first round)
32. (Republic of Ireland) William O'Connor (quarter-finals)

== Draw ==
First round (best of 11 legs); 29 October
1	(England) Joe Cullen 86.05	3
32	(Republic of Ireland) William O'Connor 88.17	6
16	(England) Jamie Hughes 94.22	6
17	(England) Dave Chisnall 92.66	5
8	(England) Nathan Aspinall 86.68	6
25	(Netherlands) Maik Kuivenhoven 82.21	3
9	(England) James Wade 92.42	6
24	(Republic of Ireland) Steve Lennon 93.02	5
4	(South Africa) Devon Petersen 95.29	6
29	(England) Andy Hamilton 87.69	1
13	(England) Rob Cross 95.18	3
20	(Netherlands) Martijn Kleermaker 91.15	6
5	(Netherlands) Michael van Gerwen 103.13	6
28	(Lithuania) Darius Labanauskas 100.06	1
12	(England) Mervyn King 86.66	2
21	(England) Ian White 91.83	6
2	(Wales) Gerwyn Price 103.68	6
31	(Belgium) Kim Huybrechts 87.00	1
15	(Scotland) Peter Wright 104.73	6
18	(Germany) Gabriel Clemens 100.36	3
7	(Austria) Mensur Suljović 90.96	6
26	(Northern Ireland) Daryl Gurney 84.52	2
10	(Poland) Krzysztof Ratajski 99.76	5
23	(England) Steve West 95.19	6
3	(Portugal) José de Sousa 95.32	6
30	(Netherlands) Jeffrey de Zwaan 87.65	3
14	(Wales) Jonny Clayton 98.88	6
19	(Germany) Max Hopp 97.59	5
6	(England) Michael Smith 89.29	6
27	(England) Ross Smith 91.34	5
11	(Netherlands) Danny Noppert 92.93	0
22	(Netherlands) Dirk van Duijvenbode 98.02	6

Second round (best of 19 legs); 30 October
32	(Republic of Ireland) William O'Connor 95.26	10
16	(England) Jamie Hughes 83.63	3
8	(England) Nathan Aspinall 95.72	8
9	(England) James Wade 96.75	10
4	(South Africa) Devon Petersen 101.09	10
20	(Netherlands) Martijn Kleermaker 91.40	8
5	(Netherlands) Michael van Gerwen 101.95	4
21	(England) Ian White 103.64	10
2	(Wales) Gerwyn Price 100.76	6
15	(Scotland) Peter Wright 102.70	10
7	(Austria) Mensur Suljović 95.01	9
23	(England) Steve West 97.19	10
3	(Portugal) José de Sousa 98.75	6
14	(Wales) Jonny Clayton 98.49	10
6	(England) Michael Smith 92.63	8
22	(Netherlands) Dirk van Duijvenbode 92.44	10

Quarter-finals (best of 19 legs); 31 October
32	(Republic of Ireland) William O'Connor 91.65	4
9	(England) James Wade 98.69	10
4	(South Africa) Devon Petersen 106.30	10
21	(England) Ian White 94.13	6
15	(Scotland) Peter Wright 104.19	10
23	(England) Steve West 98.21	6
14	(Wales) Jonny Clayton 88.19	10
22	(Netherlands) Dirk van Duijvenbode 84.21	4

Semi-finals (best of 21 legs); 1 November
9	(England) James Wade 94.51	11
4	(South Africa) Devon Petersen 97.38	10
15	(Scotland) Peter Wright 102.06	11
14	(Wales) Jonny Clayton 100.95	8

Final (best of 21 legs); 1 November
9	(England) James Wade 95.28	4
15	(Scotland) Peter Wright 104.33	11
