= Jason Lowe (darts player) =

English darts player

Personal information
- Born: 30 October 1972 (age 53) Cradley Heath, England

Sport
- Sport: Darts
- Playing since: 1991
- Darts: 26g RedDragon
- Laterality: Right-handed
- Walk-on music: "Rockin' All Over the World" by Status Quo

Organisation (see split in darts)
- BDO: 2006
- PDC: 2014–2018, 2020–2022

WDF major events – best performances
- World Masters: Last 80: 2015

PDC premier events – best performances
- World Championship: Last 32: 2021
- UK Open: Last 32: 2018, 2020
- PC Finals: Last 64: 2020, 2021

Jason Lowe (born 30 October 1972) is an English former professional darts player who competed in Professional Darts Corporation (PDC) events.

== Career ==
A builder by trade, Lowe entered Q-School in 2017 and 2018, but didn't win a Tour Card on either occasion. However, he competed in the UK Open Qualifiers, and qualified for the 2018 UK Open, by reaching the semi-final of 2018 UK Open Qualifier 4. He reached the last 32 of the event, before losing to Chris Dobey.

He entered the Challenge Tour, and reached the final of Challenge Tour 6, where he lost to Michael Barnard. He also reached his first PDC European Tour event by qualifying for the 2018 European Darts Matchplay.

Lowe won a PDC Tour Card for the first time on 16 January 2020 by beating Steve Brown at Q-School. He played on the PDC ProTour in 2020 and 2021.

== World Championship results ==
=== PDC ===
- 2021: Third round (lost to Devon Petersen 0–4)
- 2022: Second round (lost to José de Sousa 2–3)

== Performance timeline ==
=== BDO ===
Tournament	2015
BDO Ranked televised events
World Masters	3R

=== PDC ===
Tournament	2018	2020	2021	2022
PDC Ranked televised events
World Championship	DNP	DNQ	3R	2R
UK Open	4R	5R	4R	3R
Players Championship Finals	DNQ	1R	1R	DNQ
Career statistics
Year-end ranking	101	63	46	78

==== European Tour ====
Season	1	2	3	4	5	6	7	8	9	10	11	12	13
2018	EDO; DNP	GDG; DNP	GDO; DNP	ADO; DNP	EDG; DNP	DDM; DNP	GDT; DNP	DDO; DNP	EDM; 3R	GDC; DNQ	DDC; DNP	IDO; DNP	EDT; DNP
2020	BDC; DNQ	GDC; 1R	EDG; 1R	IDO; 2R									
2022	IDO; DNP	Did not qualify											GDT; 2R

==== Players Championships ====
Season	1	2	3	4	5	6	7	8	9	10	11	12	13	14	15	16	17	18	19	20	21	22	23	24	25	26	27	28	29	30
2018	Did not participate								WIG; SF	WIG; 2R	MIL; 2R	MIL; 1R	WIG; 1R	WIG; 2R	Did not participate															
2020	BAR; 1R	BAR; 4R	WIG; 1R	WIG; 3R	WIG; 3R	WIG; 1R	BAR; 3R	BAR; 2R	MIL; 4R	MIL; 4R	MIL; 1R	MIL; 4R	MIL; 1R	NIE; 1R	NIE; 2R	NIE; 1R	NIE; 2R	NIE; 2R	COV; 2R	COV; 1R	COV; 1R	COV; 1R	COV; 3R							
2021	BOL; 1R	BOL; 1R	BOL; 1R	BOL; 1R	MIL; 1R	MIL; 1R	MIL; 3R	MIL; QF	NIE; QF	NIE; 1R	NIE; 4R	NIE; 1R	MIL; 3R	MIL; 1R	MIL; 2R	MIL; 1R	COV; 2R	COV; 1R	COV; 3R	COV; 3R	BAR; 1R	BAR; 1R	BAR; DNP	BAR; 1R	BAR; 1R	BAR; 1R	BAR; DNP	BAR; 3R	BAR; 3R	BAR; 1R
2022	BAR; 4R	BAR; 3R	WIG; 2R	WIG; 1R	BAR; 1R	BAR; 3R	NIE; 3R	NIE; 1R	BAR; 2R	BAR; 1R	BAR; 1R	BAR; 1R	BAR; 1R	WIG; 1R	WIG; 1R	NIE; DNP		BAR; 1R	BAR; 1R	BAR; DNP		BAR; 2R	BAR; 1R	BAR; 1R	BAR; 2R	BAR; 1R	BAR; 1R	BAR; DNP		

Performance Table Legend
W	Won the tournament	F	Finalist	SF	Semifinalist	QF	Quarterfinalist	#R; RR; Prel.	Lost in # round Round-robin; Preliminary round	DQ	Disqualified
DNQ	Did not qualify	DNP	Did not participate	WD	Withdrew	NH	Tournament not held	#R; RR; Prel.	Lost in # round Round-robin; Preliminary round	NYF	Not yet founded
