= 2020 Players Championship Finals =

2020 Ladbrokes Players Championship Finals

Tournament information
- Dates: 27–29 November 2020
- Venue: Coventry Arena
- Location: Coventry, England
- Organisation(s): Professional Darts Corporation (PDC)
- Format: Legs
- Prize fund: £500,000
- Winner's share: £100,000
- High checkout: 167; Ryan Meikle; Callan Rydz

Champion(s)
- Michael van Gerwen (NED)

The 2020 Ladbrokes Players Championship Finals was the thirteenth edition of the PDC darts tournament, which saw the top 64 players from the Players Championship events of 2020 taking part. The tournament took place from 27 to 29 November 2020 at the Coventry Arena, Coventry, behind closed doors, as it was announced on 23 September 2020 that the usual venue of Butlin's Resort in Minehead would be unavailable due to the COVID-19 pandemic.

Michael van Gerwen was the defending champion after defeating Gerwyn Price 11–9 in the 2019 final, and successfully defended his title to win the tournament for a sixth time, with an 11–10 victory over Mervyn King in the final.

== Prize money ==
The 2020 Players Championship Finals will have a total prize fund of £500,000, the same amount that was available in 2019.

The following is the breakdown of the fund:

Position (no. of players)		Prize money (Total: £500,000)
Winner	(1)	£100,000
Runner-up	(1)	£50,000
Semi-finalists	(2)	£25,000
Quarter-finalists	(4)	£15,000
Last 16 (third round)	(8)	£10,000
Last 32 (second round)	(16)	£5,000
Last 64 (first round)	(32)	£2,500

== Qualification ==
The top 64 players from the Players Championships Order of Merit qualify, which is solely based on prize money won in the Players Championships events during the season.

On 18 November, it was announced that the Canadian 33rd seed Jeff Smith had withdrawn from the tournament, owing to the tough quarantine restrictions imposed by the COVID-19 pandemic in his country, so the next player on the Players Championships Order of Merit, Ryan Meikle became the new 64th seed, with the players ranked 34th-64th all moving up a place.

After the draw was made, Mensur Suljović withdrew due to a family bereavement, so he was directly replaced by Darren Webster in the draw.

The following players had qualified:

Click on the seed number of a player to go to their draw section.

=== Top 64 in the Players Championship Order of Merit ===
1. (Scotland) Peter Wright (semi finals)
2. (Wales) Gerwyn Price (semi finals)
3. (Netherlands) Michael van Gerwen (winner)
4. (England) Nathan Aspinall (second round)
5. (Poland) Krzysztof Ratajski (first round)
6. (England) James Wade (first round)
7. (England) Ian White (third round)
8. (England) Michael Smith (quarter finals)
9. (Portugal) José de Sousa (third round)
10. (England) Joe Cullen (quarter finals)
11. (Northern Ireland) Brendan Dolan (first round)
12. (Netherlands) Danny Noppert (second round)
13. (Australia) Damon Heta (quarter finals)
14. (England) Glen Durrant (first round)
15. (Netherlands) Jermaine Wattimena (second round)
16. (England) Ryan Searle (second round)
17. (Northern Ireland) Daryl Gurney (first round)
18. (South Africa) Devon Petersen (first round)
19. ~~(Austria) Mensur Suljović (withdrew)~~
20. (England) Stephen Bunting (first round)
21. (England) Dave Chisnall (first round)
22. (England) Ryan Joyce (first round)
23. (England) Rob Cross (second round)
24. (Netherlands) Vincent van der Voort (second round)
25. (Scotland) Gary Anderson (second round)
26. (Germany) Gabriel Clemens (second round)
27. (Netherlands) Dirk van Duijvenbode (quarter finals)
28. (Latvia) Madars Razma (second round)
29. (England) Ross Smith (third round)
30. (Wales) Jonny Clayton (second round)
31. (England) Ricky Evans (first round)
32. (England) Adrian Lewis (first round)
33. (Australia) Simon Whitlock (second round)
34. (England) Jamie Hughes (second round)
35. (Northern Ireland) Mickey Mansell (first round)
36. (Belgium) Kim Huybrechts (first round)
37. (England) Chris Dobey (first round)
38. (Republic of Ireland) William O'Connor (first round)
39. (Netherlands) Martijn Kleermaker (first round)
40. (England) Keegan Brown (first round)
41. (Netherlands) Derk Telnekes (first round)
42. (England) Jason Lowe (first round)
43. (England) Andy Boulton (second round)
44. (England) Mervyn King (runner-up)
45. (Scotland) Ryan Murray (second round)
46. (Netherlands) Jeffrey de Zwaan (third round)
47. (England) Luke Humphries (third round)
48. (England) Callan Rydz (third round)
49. (Belgium) Dimitri Van den Bergh (first round)
50. (Republic of Ireland) Steve Lennon (first round)
51. (England) Wayne Jones (second round)
52. (Netherlands) Maik Kuivenhoven (first round)
53. (England) Steve Beaton (first round)
54. (England) Luke Woodhouse (third round)
55. (England) Adam Hunt (first round)
56. (Belgium) Mike De Decker (first round)
57. (Croatia) Boris Krčmar (first round)
58. (Scotland) William Borland (first round)
59. (Netherlands) Niels Zonneveld (second round)
60. (Czech Republic) Karel Sedláček (third round)
61. (England) Scott Waites (first round)
62. (Lithuania) Darius Labanauskas (first round)
63. (Scotland) John Henderson (first round)
64. (England) Ryan Meikle (first round)
65. (England) Darren Webster (Alternate) (first round)

== Draw ==
There was no draw held, all players were put in a fixed bracket by their seeding positions.

=== Finals ===
Quarter-finals (best of 19 legs); 29 November
1	(Scotland) Peter Wright 101.87	10
8	(England) Michael Smith 102.91	6
13	(Australia) Damon Heta 97.63	8
44	(England) Mervyn King 100.74	10
2	(Wales) Gerwyn Price 96.02	10
10	(England) Joe Cullen 97.22	9
3	(Netherlands) Michael van Gerwen 110.01	10
27	(Netherlands) Dirk van Duijvenbode 103.26	5

Semi-finals (best of 21 legs); 29 November
1	(Scotland) Peter Wright 84.10	4
44	(England) Mervyn King 92.45	11
2	(Wales) Gerwyn Price 95.07	8
3	(Netherlands) Michael van Gerwen 98.52	11

Final (best of 21 legs); 29 November
44	(England) Mervyn King 99.78	10
3	(Netherlands) Michael van Gerwen 104.98	11

=== Top half ===
==== Section 1 ====
First round (best of 11 legs); 27 November
1	(Scotland) Peter Wright 104.83	6
64	(England) Ryan Meikle 101.29	5
32	(England) Adrian Lewis 90.24	4
33	(Australia) Simon Whitlock 97.36	6
16	(England) Ryan Searle 100.63	6
49	(Belgium) Dimitri Van den Bergh 93.47	2
17	(Northern Ireland) Daryl Gurney 81.86	2
48	(England) Callan Rydz 87.11	6
8	(England) Michael Smith 100.18	6
57	(Croatia) Boris Krčmar 107.79	5
25	(Scotland) Gary Anderson 89.87	6
40	(England) Keegan Brown 90.59	4
9	(Portugal) José de Sousa 96.92	6
56	(Belgium) Mike De Decker 90.81	3
24	(Netherlands) Vincent van der Voort 88.73	6
41	(Netherlands) Derk Telnekes 87.12	2

Second round (best of 11 legs); 28 November
1	(Scotland) Peter Wright 102.50	6
33	(Australia) Simon Whitlock 92.91	1
16	(England) Ryan Searle 96.96	4
48	(England) Callan Rydz 99.43	6
8	(England) Michael Smith 103.04	6
25	(Scotland) Gary Anderson 98.30	4
9	(Portugal) José de Sousa 92.36	6
24	(Netherlands) Vincent van der Voort 92.24	5

Third round (best of 19 legs); 28 November
1	(Scotland) Peter Wright 94.31	10
48	(England) Callan Rydz 87.12	9
8	(England) Michael Smith 101.84	10
9	(Portugal) José de Sousa 102.96	7

Quarter-finals (best of 19 legs); 29 November
1	(Scotland) Peter Wright 101.87	10
8	(England) Michael Smith 102.91	6

==== Section 2 ====
First round (best of 11 legs); 27 November
4	(England) Nathan Aspinall 92.15	6
61	(England) Scott Waites 91.82	5
29	(England) Ross Smith 96.29	6
36	(Belgium) Kim Huybrechts 93.15	1
13	(Australia) Damon Heta 97.53	6
52	(Netherlands) Maik Kuivenhoven 83.01	1
20	(England) Stephen Bunting 89.63	4
45	(Scotland) Ryan Murray 90.04	6
5	(Poland) Krzysztof Ratajski 93.63	4
60	(Czech Republic) Karel Sedláček 86.36	6
28	(Latvia) Madars Razma 93.48	6
37	(England) Chris Dobey 96.32	3
12	(Netherlands) Danny Noppert 100.07	6
53	(England) Steve Beaton 92.88	1
21	(England) Dave Chisnall 102.10	3
44	(England) Mervyn King 105.12	6

Second round (best of 11 legs); 28 November
4	(England) Nathan Aspinall 101.66	3
29	(England) Ross Smith 99.19	6
13	(Australia) Damon Heta 99.34	6
45	(Scotland) Ryan Murray 90.54	5
60	(Czech Republic) Karel Sedláček 87.91	6
28	(Latvia) Madars Razma 88.62	5
12	(Netherlands) Danny Noppert 85.20	1
44	(England) Mervyn King 96.39	6

Third round (best of 19 legs); 28 November
29	(England) Ross Smith 92.49	7
13	(Australia) Damon Heta 96.75	10
60	(Czech Republic) Karel Sedláček 92.70	5
44	(England) Mervyn King 93.55	10

Quarter-finals (best of 19 legs); 29 November
13	(Australia) Damon Heta 97.63	8
44	(England) Mervyn King 100.74	10

=== Bottom half ===
==== Section 3 ====
First round (best of 11 legs); 27 November
2	(Wales) Gerwyn Price 98.09	6
63	(Scotland) John Henderson 94.91	2
31	(England) Ricky Evans 87.15	2
34	(England) Jamie Hughes 98.90	6
15	(Netherlands) Jermaine Wattimena 103.53	6
50	(Republic of Ireland) Steve Lennon 102.16	1
18	(South Africa) Devon Petersen 101.46	3
47	(England) Luke Humphries 99.65	6
7	(England) Ian White 90.62	6
58	(Scotland) William Borland 89.42	4
26	(Germany) Gabriel Clemens 97.38	6
39	(Netherlands) Martijn Kleermaker 96.90	5
10	(England) Joe Cullen 95.45	6
55	(England) Adam Hunt 87.74	3
23	(England) Rob Cross 98.34	6
42	(England) Jason Lowe 94.15	3

Second round (best of 11 legs); 28 November
2	(Wales) Gerwyn Price 99.23	6
34	(England) Jamie Hughes 98.53	2
15	(Netherlands) Jermaine Wattimena 107.12	4
47	(England) Luke Humphries 107.60	6
7	(England) Ian White 104.75	6
26	(Germany) Gabriel Clemens 98.53	3
10	(England) Joe Cullen 90.12	6
23	(England) Rob Cross 86.66	5

Third round (best of 19 legs); 28 November
2	(Wales) Gerwyn Price 98.38	10
47	(England) Luke Humphries 91.62	6
7	(England) Ian White 99.37	8
10	(England) Joe Cullen 98.53	10

Quarter-finals (best of 19 legs); 29 November
2	(Wales) Gerwyn Price 96.02	10
10	(England) Joe Cullen 97.22	9

==== Section 4 ====
First round (best of 11 legs); 27 November
3	(Netherlands) Michael van Gerwen 103.34	6
62	(Lithuania) Darius Labanauskas 90.38	3
30	(Wales) Jonny Clayton 101.28	6
35	(Northern Ireland) Mickey Mansell 92.49	2
14	(England) Glen Durrant 95.65	3
51	(England) Wayne Jones 100.13	6
Alt/65	(England) Darren Webster 85.77	3
46	(Netherlands) Jeffrey de Zwaan 100.25	6
6	(England) James Wade 93.43	3
59	(Netherlands) Niels Zonneveld 94.41	6
27	(Netherlands) Dirk van Duijvenbode 101.16	6
38	(Republic of Ireland) William O'Connor 102.85	4
11	(Northern Ireland) Brendan Dolan 97.71	4
54	(England) Luke Woodhouse 99.04	6
22	(England) Ryan Joyce 93.19	4
43	(England) Andy Boulton 94.57	6

Second round (best of 11 legs); 28 November
3	(Netherlands) Michael van Gerwen 100.63	6
30	(Wales) Jonny Clayton 98.15	4
51	(England) Wayne Jones 93.26	4
46	(Netherlands) Jeffrey de Zwaan 100.23	6
59	(Netherlands) Niels Zonneveld 92.80	1
27	(Netherlands) Dirk van Duijvenbode 92.70	6
54	(England) Luke Woodhouse 94.32	6
43	(England) Andy Boulton 95.92	4

Third round (best of 19 legs); 28 November
3	(Netherlands) Michael van Gerwen 96.33	10
46	(Netherlands) Jeffrey de Zwaan 91.04	7
27	(Netherlands) Dirk van Duijvenbode 99.55	10
54	(England) Luke Woodhouse 85.98	1

Quarter-finals (best of 19 legs); 29 November
3	(Netherlands) Michael van Gerwen 110.01	10
27	(Netherlands) Dirk van Duijvenbode 103.26	5
