= 2018 World Series of Darts Finals =

2018 bwin World Series of Darts Finals

Tournament information
- Dates: 2–4 November 2018
- Venue: Multiversum Schwechat
- Location: Vienna
- Country: Austria
- Organisation(s): PDC
- Format: Legs
- Prize fund: £250,000
- Winner's share: £50,000
- High checkout: 170 (Scotland) Gary Anderson (England) Michael Smith

Champion(s)
- (England) James Wade

The 2018 bwin World Series of Darts Finals was the fourth staging of the World Series of Darts Finals tournament, organised by the Professional Darts Corporation. The tournament took place in the Multiversum Schwechat, Vienna, Austria, from 2–4 November 2018. It featured a field of 24 players.

Michael van Gerwen was three-time defending champion after defeating Gary Anderson 11–6 in the 2017 final, but lost in the quarter-finals to Raymond van Barneveld 8–10. This ended a 13-match unbeaten streak and 3-year reign as champion.

James Wade won his first World Series Finals title. It was his second title in as many weeks after he beat Michael Smith 11–10 in a dramatic final, in which Wade missed two match darts in the penultimate leg and Smith missed five match darts in the final leg.

== Prize money ==
The total prize money remained £250,000.

Position (no. of players)		Prize money (Total: £250,000)
Winner	(1)	£50,000
Runner-up	(1)	£25,000
Semi-finalists	(2)	£16,500
Quarter-finalists	(4)	£12,500
Last 16 (second round)	(8)	£7,500
Last 24 (first round)	(8)	£4,000

== Qualification ==
The top eight players from the six World Series events of 2018 are seeded for this tournament. Those events are:

- 2018 German Darts Masters
- 2018 US Darts Masters
- 2018 Shanghai Darts Masters
- 2018 Auckland Darts Masters
- 2018 Melbourne Darts Masters
- 2018 Brisbane Darts Masters

In addition, the next four highest ranked players from the PDC Order of Merit following the 2018 World Grand Prix final on 6 October 2018 qualify, as will the next eight players on the World Series Order of Merit. Another four places were awarded following a Tour Card Holders' qualifier in Barnsley on 19 October.

Corey Cadby originally qualified through the World Series Order of Merit, but withdrew following a broken arm in a car accident. Royden Lam replaced him. Dawson Murschell also originally qualified through the World Series Order of Merit, but withdrew on the day of the tournament with illness. Max Hopp replaced Murschell as the highest player from the Order of Merit who had not qualified and was able to play, with Mark McGrath, Tim Pusey and Haupai Puha unable to make the journey at such short notice.

The following players qualified for the tournament:

World Series Top 8

(seedings after all events)

1. (Scotland) Peter Wright (second round)
2. (England) Rob Cross (second round)
3. (Netherlands) Michael van Gerwen (quarter-finals)
4. (Scotland) Gary Anderson (second round)
5. (England) Michael Smith (runner-up)
6. (Netherlands) Raymond van Barneveld (semi-finals)
7. (Austria) Mensur Suljović (second round)
8. (Australia) Simon Whitlock (quarter-finals)

PDC Order of Merit Qualifiers
- (Northern Ireland) Daryl Gurney (second round)
- (England) Dave Chisnall (quarter-finals)
- (England) Ian White (first round)
- (Wales) Gerwyn Price (semi-finals)

Tour Card Qualifiers
- (England) Steve Beaton (first round)
- (England) Keegan Brown (first round)
- (England) Ross Smith (first round)
- (Germany) Maik Langendorf (first round)

World Series Order of Merit
- (England) James Wade (champion)
- (Belgium) Dimitri Van den Bergh (first round)
- (Australia) Kyle Anderson (second round)
- (Australia) Damon Heta (second round)
- (Australia) Raymond Smith (second round)
- (Wales) Jamie Lewis (quarter-finals)
- (Hong Kong) Royden Lam (first round)
- (Germany) Max Hopp (first round)

== Draw ==
First round (best of 11 legs); 2 November
RQ	(Wales) Gerwyn Price 90.57	6
(Hong Kong) Royden Lam 73.49	1
Q	(England) Steve Beaton 98.54	0
RQ	(Northern Ireland) Daryl Gurney 102.48	6
RQ	(England) Ian White 97.36	4
(Australia) Kyle Anderson 101.35	6
RQ	(England) Dave Chisnall 102.91	6
(Germany) Max Hopp 84.39	1
(Wales) Jamie Lewis 109.82	6
(Belgium) Dimitri Van den Bergh 105.21	2
Q	(England) Ross Smith 87.11	3
(England) James Wade 91.16	6
(Australia) Raymond Smith 93.48	6
Q	(England) Keegan Brown 92.16	3
Q	(Germany) Maik Langendorf 80.70	5
(Australia) Damon Heta 83.21	6

Second round (best of 11 legs); 3 November
1	(Scotland) Peter Wright 79.94	1
RQ	(Wales) Gerwyn Price 81.44	6
8	(Australia) Simon Whitlock 88.86	6
RQ	(Northern Ireland) Daryl Gurney 95.02	5
5	(England) Michael Smith 103.98	6
(Australia) Kyle Anderson 97.46	3
4	(Scotland) Gary Anderson 100.36	5
RQ	(England) Dave Chisnall 95.80	6
2	(England) Rob Cross 83.86	5
(Wales) Jamie Lewis 87.87	6
7	(Austria) Mensur Suljović 87.30	3
(England) James Wade 97.82	6
6	(Netherlands) Raymond van Barneveld 89.63	6
(Australia) Raymond Smith 83.77	5
3	(Netherlands) Michael van Gerwen 104.86	6
(Australia) Damon Heta 85.62	0

Quarter-finals (best of 19 legs); 4 November
RQ	(Wales) Gerwyn Price 96.75	10
8	(Australia) Simon Whitlock 98.91	7
5	(England) Michael Smith 100.09	10
RQ	(England) Dave Chisnall 100.10	5
(Wales) Jamie Lewis 84.08	5
(England) James Wade 94.40	10
6	(Netherlands) Raymond van Barneveld 99.67	10
3	(Netherlands) Michael van Gerwen 103.59	8

Semi-finals (best of 21 legs); 4 November
RQ	(Wales) Gerwyn Price 96.38	8
5	(England) Michael Smith 98.00	11
(England) James Wade 99.37	11
6	(Netherlands) Raymond van Barneveld 93.60	2

Final (best of 21 legs); 4 November
5	(England) Michael Smith 99.09	10
(England) James Wade 97.00	11
