= 2018 World Series of Darts =

The 2018 World Series of Darts was a series of televised darts tournaments organised by the Professional Darts Corporation. In 2018, there were 6 World Series events and one finals event, which has this year been moved from Glasgow, Scotland, to Vienna, Austria.

== Prize money ==
=== International events ===
Stage	Prize money
Winner	£20,000
Runner-up	£10,000
Semi-finals	£5,000
Quarter-finals	£2,500
First round	£1,250

=== Final ===
Stage	Prize money
Winner	£50,000
Runner-up	£25,000
Semi-finals	£16,500
Quarter-finals	£12,500
Second round	£7,500
First round	£4,000

== World Series events ==
No.	Date	Event	Venue	Champion	Legs	Runner-up	Ref
1	25 May	German Masters	(Germany) Gelsenkirchen, Veltins-Arena	Mensur Suljović (Austria)	8–2	(Belgium) Dimitri Van den Bergh	
2	6–7 July	US Masters	(United States) Las Vegas, Mandalay Bay	Gary Anderson (Scotland)	8–4	(England) Rob Cross	
3	13–14 July	Shanghai Masters	(China) Shanghai, Pullman Hotel	Michael Smith (England)	8–2	(England) Rob Cross	
4	3–5 August	Auckland Masters	(New Zealand) Auckland, The Trusts Arena	Michael van Gerwen (Netherlands)	11–4	(Netherlands) Raymond van Barneveld	
5	10–12 August	Melbourne Masters	(Australia) Melbourne, Hisense Arena	Peter Wright (Scotland)	11–8	(England) Michael Smith	
6	17–19 August	Brisbane Masters	(Australia) Brisbane, BCEC	Rob Cross (England)	11–6	(Netherlands) Michael van Gerwen	
7	2–4 November	World Series of Darts Finals	(Austria) Vienna, Multiversum Schwechat	James Wade (England)	11–10	(England) Michael Smith	

== World Series qualifiers ==
German Masters
- (Germany) Max Hopp
- (Germany) Martin Schindler
- (Germany) Nico Kurz
- (Germany) Manfred Bilderl
- (Germany) Gabriel Clemens
- (Germany) Stefan Stoyke
- (Germany) Dragutin Horvat
- (Germany) Robert Marijanović

US Masters
- (Canada) Dawson Murschell
- (United States) Joe Huffman
- (Canada) John Norman Jnr
- (United States) DJ Sayre
- (Canada) Ross Snook
- (Canada) David Cameron
- (United States) Dan Lauby Jr
- (Canada) Jeff Smith

Shanghai Masters
- (Philippines) Lourence Ilagan
- (Japan) Seigo Asada
- (Hong Kong) Royden Lam
- (China) Zong Xiao Chen
- (China) Liu Cheng An
- (China) Hai Long Chen
- (China) Lihao Wen
- (China) Yuanjun Liu

Auckland Masters
- (New Zealand) Cody Harris
- (New Zealand) Warren Parry
- (Australia) Tim Pusey
- (New Zealand) Haupai Puha
- (New Zealand) Ben Robb
- (New Zealand) John Hurring
- (New Zealand) Tahuna Irwin
- (New Zealand) Mark McGrath

Melbourne Masters
- (Australia) Corey Cadby
- (Australia) Raymond Smith
- (Australia) Tim Pusey
- (New Zealand) Haupai Puha
- (Australia) Damon Heta
- (Australia) Mike Bonser
- (Australia) Raymond O'Donnell
- (Australia) James Bailey

Brisbane Masters
- (Australia) Corey Cadby
- (Australia) Raymond Smith
- (Australia) Tim Pusey
- (New Zealand) Mark Cleaver
- (Australia) Damon Heta
- (Australia) Gordon Mathers
- (Australia) Barry Gardner
- (Australia) Justin Thompson

== 2018 World Series Order of Merit ==
The top eight qualified (highlighted in green) for the World Series of Darts Finals and determined their seeding. The next 8 players qualified (highlighted in cyan) for the tournament, but were unseeded. The players highlighted in yellow qualified by the PDC Order of Merit. (The players who aren't highlighted either withdrew or couldn't make the Finals as late call-ups.)

Rank	Player	German Masters	US Masters	Shanghai Masters	Auckland Masters	Melbourne Masters	Brisbane Masters	Tour points	Appearances
1	(Scotland) Peter Wright	5	5	5	5	12	5	37	6
2	(England) Rob Cross	3	8	8	3	3	12	37	6
3	(Netherlands) Michael van Gerwen	3	3	5	12	5	8	36	6
4	(Scotland) Gary Anderson	5	12	1	3	5	3	29	6
5	(England) Michael Smith	–	3	12	1	8	1	25	5
6	(Netherlands) Raymond van Barneveld	3	–	–	8	3	5	19	4
7	(Austria) Mensur Suljović	12	–	–	–	–	–	12	1
8	(Australia) Simon Whitlock	–	–	–	5	3	1	9	3
	(England) James Wade	–	5	3	–	–	–	8	2
	(Belgium) Dimitri Van den Bergh	8	–	–	–	–	–	8	1
	(Australia) Kyle Anderson	–	–	–	3	1	3	7	3
	(Northern Ireland) Daryl Gurney	–	3	3	–	–	–	6	2
	(Wales) Gerwyn Price	–	1	3	–	–	–	4	2
	(Australia) Damon Heta	–	–	–	–	3	1	4	2
	(Australia) Corey Cadby	–	–	–	–	1	3	4	2
	(Australia) Raymond Smith	–	–	–	–	1	3	4	2
	(Wales) Jamie Lewis	3	–	–	–	–	–	3	1
	(Canada) Dawson Murschell	–	3	–	–	–	–	3	1
	(Hong Kong) Royden Lam	–	–	3	–	–	–	3	1
	(New Zealand) Mark McGrath	–	–	–	3	–	–	3	1
	(Australia) Tim Pusey	–	–	–	1	1	1	3	3
	(New Zealand) Haupai Puha	–	–	–	1	1	–	2	2
	(Germany) Max Hopp	1	–	–	–	–	–	1	1
