= Raymond Smith (darts player) =

Australian darts player (born 1979)

Personal information
- Nickname: "Guru"
- Born: 6 December 1979 (age 46) Brisbane, Australia

Sport
- Sport: Darts
- Playing since: 2004
- Darts: 22g Shot Signature
- Laterality: Right-handed
- Walk-on music: "Can't Hold Us" by Macklemore & Ryan Lewis feat. Ray Dalton "Galvanize" by The Chemical Brothers feat. Q-Tip

Organisation (see split in darts)
- BDO: 2008, 2015–2017
- PDC: 2018–present
- WDF: 2021–present
- Current world ranking: (WDF) 15 ▼5 (17 August 2026) (PDC) NR (5 November 2026)

WDF major events – best performances
- World Championship: Last 16: 2025
- World Masters: Last 32: 2016
- Australian Open: Winner (1): 2022

PDC premier events – best performances
- World Championship: Last 16: 2022
- Grand Slam: Group Stage: 2026
- World Series Finals: Last 24: 2018

Other tournament wins
- Years
ADA Tour	2025 (x4), 2026 (x5)
Australian Classic	2015
New South Wales Open	2015
North Queensland Classic	2015, 2016, 2021, 2024
Challenger Classic	2021
Pacific Masters	2023
Sunshine State Classic	2016, 2022
DPA Pro Tour	2018 (x5), 2022 (x4)
DPA Satellite Finals	2021, 2022
MODUS Super Series 2	2023
Medal record
Men's Darts
Representing Australia
WDF World Cup
Gold medal – first place	2017 Kobe	Men's team
WDF Asia-Pacific Cup
Gold medal – first place	2016 Osaka	Team event
Bronze medal – third place	2016 Osaka	Men's pairs

Raymond Smith (born 6 December 1979) is an Australian professional darts player who competes in both Professional Darts Corporation (PDC) and World Darts Federation (WDF) events.

== Career ==
=== BDO ===
In 2015, Smith won the Central Coast Australian Classic, New South Wales Open and North Queensland Classic. In 2016 he won the Sunshine State Classic and the North Queensland Classic for the second time. He reached the Last 32 of the 2016 World Masters. He qualified for the 2017 BDO World Darts Championship, beating Davy Van Baelen in the preliminary round before losing to Geert De Vos.

=== PDC ===
Smith competed on the DartPlayers Australia tour in 2018; winning five events and topping the rankings to qualify for the 2019 PDC World Darts Championship. He also competed in two Australia-held events on the 2018 World Series of Darts, the Melbourne Darts Masters where he lost in the first round to Michael van Gerwen, and the 2018 Brisbane Darts Masters where he beat Michael Smith before being knocked out by Peter Wright. Raymond Smith qualified for the 2022 PDC World Darts Championship and reached the last 16 losing to Mervyn King 4–3, having led the match 3–1. He beat Jamie Hughes, Devon Petersen and Florian Hempel along the way.

On 4 February 2023, Smith won the second edition of the MODUS Super Series beating Matt Clark in the final in a last leg decider.

Raymond Smith competed in the inaugural Australian Darts Association Tour in 2025. At the end of June, he won all 4 events in the opening weekend.

Smith was also one of eight players invited to compete in the inaugural ANZ Premier League. He reached 4 finals and won 2 of them to end the league phase on top with the most points. At finals night, Smith won his semi-final clash against Tim Pusey 8–2 but lost in the final to Simon Whitlock 10–7. The winner was also awarded a spot at the 2026 PDC World Darts Championship. However, Smith announced that he would have declined the spot at Alexandra Palace, focusing his efforts at the 2025 WDF World Championship instead.

== Personal life ==
Raymond has a son, Ky Smith, who is also a professional darts player. In the 2022 PDC World Darts Championship, they became the first father-son duo to compete at a World Championship in the same year.

== World Championship results ==
=== BDO/WDF ===
- 2017: First round (lost to Geert De Vos 0–3)
- 2025: Third round (lost to Jenson Walker 1–3)

=== PDC World Championship ===
- 2019: First round (lost to Alan Tabern 2–3)
- 2022: Fourth round (lost to Mervyn King 3–4)
- 2023: First round (lost to Karel Sedláček 0–3)

== Performance timeline ==
=== BDO ===
Tournament	2016	2017
BDO Ranked televised events
World Championship	DNQ	1R
World Masters	RR	DNP

=== PDC ===
Tournament	2018	2019	2022	2023	2026
PDC Ranked televised events
World Championship	BDO	1R	4R	1R	DNQ
Grand Slam	Did not participate				RR
PDC Non-ranked televised events
World Series Finals	2R	Did not participate			1R
Career statistics
Season-end ranking (PDC)	NR	NR	82	144	

==== Australian Darts Association Tour ====
Season	1	2	3	4	5	6	7	8	9	10	11	12
2025	W	W	W	W	DNP				SF	F	L32	F

==== ANZ Premier League ====
Season	1	2	3	4	5	6	7	F
2025	MLB; F	NEW; W	CAN; SF	HOB; F	ADE; SF	WEL; SF	GOL; W	BRI; F
2026	CAN; W							

Performance Table Legend
W	Won the tournament	F	Finalist	SF	Semifinalist	QF	Quarterfinalist	#R; RR; L#	Lost in # round Round-robin; Last # stage	DQ	Disqualified
DNQ	Did not qualify	DNP	Did not participate	WD	Withdrew	NH	Tournament not held	#R; RR; L#	Lost in # round Round-robin; Last # stage	NYF	Not yet founded
