= 2018 Shanghai Darts Masters =

2018 21.co.uk Shanghai Darts Masters

Tournament information
- Dates: 13–14 July 2018
- Venue: Pullman Hotel
- Location: Shanghai
- Country: China
- Organisation(s): PDC
- Format: Legs
- Prize fund: £60,000
- Winner's share: £20,000
- High checkout: 170 Michael van Gerwen

Champion(s)
- (England) Michael Smith

The 2018 21.co.uk Shanghai Darts Masters was the third staging of the tournament by the Professional Darts Corporation and the second entry in the 2018 World Series of Darts. The tournament featured 16 players (eight PDC players facing eight regional qualifiers) and was held at the Pullman Hotel in Shanghai, China from 13 to 14 July 2018.

Michael van Gerwen was the defending champion after defeating Dave Chisnall 8–0 in the final of the 2017 event, but he lost 8–4 in the semi-finals to Michael Smith.

Smith went on to win his first World Series title by beating Rob Cross 8–2 in the final.

== Prize money ==
The total prize fund was £60,000.

Position (no. of players)		Prize money (Total: £60,000)
Winner	(1)	£20,000
Runner-up	(1)	£10,000
Semi-finalists	(2)	£5,000
Quarter-finalists	(4)	£2,500
First round	(8)	£1,250

== Qualifiers ==
The eight invited PDC representatives are (seeded according to the 2018 World Series of Darts Order of Merit):

1. (Scotland) Gary Anderson (first round)
2. (England) Rob Cross (runner-up)
3. (Scotland) Peter Wright (semi-finals)
4. (Netherlands) Michael van Gerwen (semi-finals)
5. (England) James Wade (quarter-finals)
6. (Northern Ireland) Daryl Gurney (quarter-finals)
7. (England) Michael Smith (champion)
8. (Wales) Gerwyn Price (quarter-finals)

The Asian representatives will be:

The top 3 players from the PDC Asian Tour Order of Merit after Event 6.

1. (Hong Kong) Royden Lam (quarter-finals)
2. (Philippines) Lourence Ilagan (first round)
3. (Japan) Seigo Asada (first round)

Four winners of a Chinese qualifier.

1. (China) Zong Xiao Chen (first round)
2. (China) Yuanjun Liu (first round)
3. (China) Chengan Liu (first round)
4. (China) Lihao Wen (first round)

One other qualifier, the criteria for which has not been announced by the Professional Darts Corporation.

1. (China) Hai Long Chen (first round)

== Draw ==
First round (best of 11 legs); 13 July
1	(Scotland) Gary Anderson 97.23	5
(Hong Kong) Royden Lam 86.87	6
(England) Michael Smith 98.02	6
(China) Zong Xiao Chen 78.83	0
4	(Netherlands) Michael van Gerwen 104.02	6
(China) Lihao Wen 81.81	1
(Northern Ireland) Daryl Gurney 94.23	6
(Philippines) Lourence Ilagan 82.28	1
2	(England) Rob Cross 98.02	6
(China) Chengan Liu 82.90	0
(England) James Wade 103.66	6
(China) Hai Long Chen 67.82	0
3	(Scotland) Peter Wright 97.19	6
(Japan) Seigo Asada 88.89	3
(Wales) Gerwyn Price 102.49	6
(China) Yuanjun Liu 81.62	2

Quarter-finals (best of 15 legs); 14 July
(Hong Kong) Royden Lam 93.23	5
(England) Michael Smith 91.43	8
4	(Netherlands) Michael van Gerwen 99.24	8
(Northern Ireland) Daryl Gurney 89.37	4
2	(England) Rob Cross 106.23	8
(England) James Wade 99.21	3
3	(Scotland) Peter Wright 90.58	8
(Wales) Gerwyn Price 89.49	7

Semi-finals (best of 15 legs); 14 July
(England) Michael Smith 92.98	8
4	(Netherlands) Michael van Gerwen 93.22	4
2	(England) Rob Cross 94.48	8
3	(Scotland) Peter Wright 96.37	5

Final (best of 15 legs); 14 July
(England) Michael Smith 97.03	8
2	(England) Rob Cross 92.12	2
