= 2018 Auckland Darts Masters =

2018 Auckland Darts Masters, presented by Burger King & TAB

Tournament information
- Dates: 3–5 August 2018
- Venue: The Trusts Arena
- Location: Auckland
- Country: New Zealand
- Organisation(s): PDC
- Format: Legs
- Prize fund: £60,000
- Winner's share: £20,000
- High checkout: 170 (Scotland) Gary Anderson (Netherlands) Michael van Gerwen

Champion(s)
- (Netherlands) Michael van Gerwen

The 2018 Auckland Darts Masters, presented by Burger King & TAB was the fourth staging of the tournament by the Professional Darts Corporation, as the fourth entry in the 2018 World Series of Darts. The tournament featured 16 players (eight PDC players facing eight regional qualifiers) and was held at The Trusts Arena in Auckland, New Zealand from 3–5 August 2018.

Kyle Anderson was the defending champion after defeating compatriot Corey Cadby 11–10 in the 2017 final, but lost 10–3 to Peter Wright in the quarter-finals.

Michael van Gerwen won the title after beating Raymond van Barneveld 11–4 in the final.

== Prize money ==
The total prize fund was £60,000.

Position (no. of players)		Prize money (Total: £60,000)
Winner	(1)	£20,000
Runner-up	(1)	£10,000
Semi-finalists	(2)	£5,000
Quarter-finalists	(4)	£2,500
First round	(8)	£1,250

== Qualifiers ==
The eight invited PDC representatives, (seeded according to the 2018 World Series of Darts Order of Merit) are:

1. (England) Rob Cross (quarter-finals)
2. (Scotland) Gary Anderson (quarter-finals)
3. (Scotland) Peter Wright (semi-finals)
4. (England) Michael Smith (first round)
5. (Netherlands) Michael van Gerwen (winner)
6. (Netherlands) Raymond van Barneveld (runner-up)
7. (Australia) Simon Whitlock (semi-finals)
8. (Australia) Kyle Anderson (quarter-finals)

The regional qualifiers are:

Qualification	Player
~~Wildcard~~	(Australia) ~~Corey Cadby~~
Wildcard (NZ World Championship representative)	(New Zealand) Cody Harris (first round)
2018 DPNZ Order of Merit (First place)	(New Zealand) Warren Parry (first round)
2018 DPNZ Order of Merit (Second place)	(New Zealand) Haupai Puha (first round)
2018 DPA World Series Order of Merit (First place)	(Australia) Tim Pusey (first round)
Winner of DPNZ Qualifier 1	(New Zealand) Tahuna Irwin (first round)
Winner of DPNZ Qualifier 2	(New Zealand) Mark McGrath (quarter-finals)
Winner of DPNZ Qualifier 3	(New Zealand) John Hurring (first round)
2018 DPNZ Order of Merit (Third place) (Cadby replacement)	(New Zealand) Ben Robb (first round)

2018 UK Open runner-up Corey Cadby was originally announced as a PDC representative, before later being named as a regional qualifier, and then withdrawing due to a visa issue. Ben Robb replaced him.

== Draw ==
First round (best of 11 legs); 3 August
1	(England) Rob Cross 87.70	6
(New Zealand) John Hurring 86.83	5
(Australia) Simon Whitlock 92.22	6
(New Zealand) Ben Robb 89.49	5
4	(England) Michael Smith 83.45	4
(New Zealand) Mark McGrath 83.46	6
(Netherlands) Raymond van Barneveld 95.34	6
(New Zealand) Warren Parry 91.12	4
2	(Scotland) Gary Anderson 94.52	6
(Australia) Tim Pusey 91.79	3
(Netherlands) Michael van Gerwen 102.45	6
(New Zealand) Cody Harris 85.20	2
3	(Scotland) Peter Wright 94.77	6
(New Zealand) Tahuna Irwin 86.59	3
(Australia) Kyle Anderson 94.51	6
(New Zealand) Haupai Puha 92.38	4

Quarter-finals (best of 19 legs); 4 August
1	(England) Rob Cross 97.61	7
(Australia) Simon Whitlock 99.43	10
(New Zealand) Mark McGrath 85.83	4
(Netherlands) Raymond van Barneveld 89.43	10
2	(Scotland) Gary Anderson 96.94	4
(Netherlands) Michael van Gerwen 105.87	10
3	(Scotland) Peter Wright 93.66	10
(Australia) Kyle Anderson 90.84	3

Semi-finals (best of 19 legs); 5 August
(Australia) Simon Whitlock 91.57	5
(Netherlands) Raymond van Barneveld 102.79	10
(Netherlands) Michael van Gerwen 102.76	10
3	(Scotland) Peter Wright 91.52	3

Final (best of 21 legs); 5 August
(Netherlands) Raymond van Barneveld 93.33	4
(Netherlands) Michael van Gerwen 97.72	11
