= 2018 Brisbane Darts Masters =

Tournament information
- Dates: 17–19 August 2018
- Venue: BCEC
- Location: Brisbane
- Country: Australia
- Organisation(s): PDC
- Format: Legs
- Prize fund: £60,000
- Winner's share: £20,000
- High checkout: 170 (Netherlands) Raymond van Barneveld (Netherlands) Michael van Gerwen

Champion(s)
- (England) Rob Cross

The 2018 Brisbane Darts Masters was the inaugural staging of the tournament by the Professional Darts Corporation, as a sixth and final entry in the 2018 World Series of Darts. The tournament featured 16 players (eight PDC players facing eight regional qualifiers) and was held at the BCEC in Brisbane from 17–19 August 2018.

Rob Cross became the inaugural champion in Brisbane, after defeating Michael van Gerwen 11–6 in the final.

== Prize money ==
The total prize fund was £60,000.

Position (no. of players)		Prize money (Total: £60,000)
Winner	(1)	£20,000
Runner-up	(1)	£10,000
Semi-finalists	(2)	£5,000
Quarter-finalists	(4)	£2,500
First round	(8)	£1,250

== Qualifiers ==
The eight invited PDC representatives, (seeded according to the 2018 World Series of Darts Order of Merit) are:

1. (Scotland) Peter Wright (semi-finals)
2. (Netherlands) Michael van Gerwen (runner-up)
3. (Scotland) Gary Anderson (quarter-finals)
4. (England) Rob Cross (champion)
5. (England) Michael Smith (first round)
6. (Netherlands) Raymond van Barneveld (semi-finals)
7. (Australia) Simon Whitlock (first round)
8. (Australia) Kyle Anderson (quarter-finals)

The regional qualifiers are:

Qualification	Player
Wildcard	(Australia) Corey Cadby (quarter-finals)
2018 DPA World Series Order of Merit (First place)	(Australia) Tim Pusey (first round)
2018 DPA World Series Order of Merit (Second place)	(Australia) Raymond Smith (quarter-finals)
DPNZ Qualifier	(New Zealand) Mark Cleaver (first round)
Winner of DPA Qualifier 1	(Australia) Damon Heta (first round)
Winner of DPA Qualifier 2	(Australia) Gordon Mathers (first round)
Winner of DPA Qualifier 3	(Australia) Barry Gardner (first round)
Winner of DPA Qualifier 4	(Australia) Justin Thompson (first round)

== Draw ==
First round (best of 11 legs); 17 August
1	(Scotland) Peter Wright 100.37	6
(Australia) Justin Thompson 89.90	2
(England) Michael Smith 87.62	1
(Australia) Raymond Smith 98.35	6
4	(England) Rob Cross 95.80	6
(Australia) Tim Pusey 91.47	2
(Australia) Simon Whitlock 93.61	5
(Australia) Corey Cadby 96.20	6
2	(Netherlands) Michael van Gerwen 99.15	6
(New Zealand) Mark Cleaver 85.16	2
(Australia) Kyle Anderson 98.77	6
(Australia) Barry Gardner 78.48	2
3	(Scotland) Gary Anderson 94.99	6
(Australia) Damon Heta 94.60	5
(Netherlands) Raymond van Barneveld 90.54	6
(Australia) Gordon Mathers 75.35	1

Quarter-finals (best of 19 legs); 18 August
1	(Scotland) Peter Wright 101.91	10
(Australia) Raymond Smith 87.71	4
4	(England) Rob Cross 101.02	10
(Australia) Corey Cadby 90.80	4
2	(Netherlands) Michael van Gerwen 98.44	10
(Australia) Kyle Anderson 91.60	3
3	(Scotland) Gary Anderson 96.13	8
(Netherlands) Raymond van Barneveld 93.70	10

Semi-finals (best of 21 legs); 19 August
1	(Scotland) Peter Wright 101.04	8
4	(England) Rob Cross 95.79	11
2	(Netherlands) Michael van Gerwen 96.81	11
(Netherlands) Raymond van Barneveld 93.91	9

Final (best of 21 legs); 19 August
4	(England) Rob Cross 103.81	11
2	(Netherlands) Michael van Gerwen 98.41	6
