= 2018 Premier League Darts =

Darts competition

2018 Unibet Premier League Darts

Tournament information
- Dates: 1 February–17 May 2018

Champion(s)
- Michael van Gerwen (NED)

The 2018 Unibet Premier League Darts was a darts tournament organised by the Professional Darts Corporation – the fourteenth edition of the tournament. The event began on Thursday 1 February at the 3Arena in Dublin and ended with the play-offs at The O2 Arena in London on Thursday 17 May. This was the first year that the tournament is sponsored by Unibet.

Michael van Gerwen won his fourth Premier League title (and his third in a row, after winning in 2016 and 2017) by defeating Michael Smith 11–4 in the final.

This was also the first time that the event has had a round in Germany, when the Mercedes-Benz Arena in Berlin hosted the 4th round on 22 February.

Storm Emma resulted in the Exeter round of the event being postponed on 1 March. This was the first time ever since the Premier League started in 2005 that a whole round in the league phase of Premier League Darts was postponed. The same extreme conditions would also go on to cause severe problems in the staging of that weekends UK Open in Minehead which resulted in the event having to be played entirely behind closed doors. In 2010, the play-offs were postponed for 24 hours after a power cut at Wembley Arena.

== Format ==
The tournament format was identical to that since 2013. During the first nine weeks (Phase 1) each player played the other nine players once. The bottom two players were then eliminated from the competition. In the next six weeks (phase 2) each player played the other seven players once. Phase 2 consisted of four weeks where five matches were played followed by two weeks where four matches were played. At the end of phase 2, the top four players contested the two semi-finals and the final in the play-off week.

== Venues ==
(Republic of Ireland) Dublin	(Wales) Cardiff	(England) Newcastle	(Germany) Berlin
3Arena; Thursday 1 February	Cardiff International Arena; Thursday 8 February	Newcastle Arena; Thursday 15 February	Mercedes-Benz Arena; Thursday 22 February
(England) Exeter	(England) Leeds	(England) Nottingham	(Scotland) Glasgow
Westpoint Exeter; Thursday 1 March (cancelled)	Leeds Arena; Thursday 8 March	Nottingham Arena; Thursday 15 March	SSE Hydro; Thursday 22 March
(Northern Ireland) Belfast	(England) Liverpool	(England) Sheffield	(Netherlands) Rotterdam
SSE Arena Belfast; Thursday 29 March	Liverpool Arena; Thursday 5 April (Judgement Night)	Sheffield Arena; Thursday 12 April	Rotterdam Ahoy; Wednesday 18 & Thursday 19 April
(England) Manchester	(England) Birmingham	(Scotland) Aberdeen	(England) London
Manchester Arena; Thursday 26 April	Arena Birmingham; Thursday 3 May	AECC Arena; Thursday 10 May	The O_{2} Thursday 17 May

== Players ==
The players in this year's tournament were announced following the 2018 PDC World Darts Championship final on 1 January, with the top four of the PDC Order of Merit joined by six Wildcards. This was the first time in the event's history in which Phil Taylor did not take part, following his decision to retire. Unlike in previous years the six wildcards were joint decisions by the PDC and Sky Sports this year. There were no PDC specific wildcards or Sky Sports specific wildcards.

The tournament was noteworthy for its high-number of debuting players. Rob Cross qualified by right due to being in the world's top four at the end of the season, with wildcards going to World Grand Prix champion Daryl Gurney, Champions League winner Mensur Suljović, and world number 12 Gerwyn Price. In fact, only four of the previous year's ten players (van Gerwen, Wright, Anderson and van Barneveld) were included this year.

Player	Appearance in Premier League	Consecutive Streak	Order of Merit Rank	Previous best performance	Qualification
(Netherlands) Michael van Gerwen	6th	6	1	Winner (2013, 2016, 2017)	PDC Order of Merit
(Scotland) Peter Wright	5th	5	2	Runner-up (2017)	PDC Order of Merit
(England) Rob Cross	1st	1	3	Debut	PDC Order of Merit
(Scotland) Gary Anderson	8th	8	5 (4) (Note: Phil Taylor, who was ranked 4th in the PDC Order of Merit following the 2018 PDC World Darts Championship, retired following the tournament. Anderson therefore received the 4th automatic spot.)	Winner (2011, 2015)	PDC Order of Merit
(Northern Ireland) Daryl Gurney	1st	1	6	Debut	Wildcard
(Austria) Mensur Suljović	1st	1	7	Debut	Wildcard
(Australia) Simon Whitlock	6th	1	9	Runner-up (2012)	Wildcard
(Netherlands) Raymond van Barneveld	13th	13	12	Winner (2014)	Wildcard
(England) Michael Smith	2nd	1	10	10th (2016)	Wildcard
(Wales) Gerwyn Price	1st	1	13	Debut	Wildcard

== Prize money ==
The prize fund remained the same as last year, £825,000.

Stage	Prize money
Winner	£250,000
Runner-up	£120,000
Semi-finalists	£80,000
5th place	£65,000
6th place	£55,000
7th place	£50,000
8th place	£45,000
9th place	£30,000
10th place	£25,000
League Winner Bonus	£25,000
Total	£825,000

== League stage ==
=== 1 February – week 1 (Phase 1) ===
(Republic of Ireland) 3Arena, Dublin

	Score	
Mensur Suljović (Austria); 103.71	5–7	(Australia) Simon Whitlock; 106.49
Gary Anderson (Scotland); 82.46	5–7	(England) Michael Smith; 89.12
Daryl Gurney (Northern Ireland); 93.23	6–6	(Netherlands) Raymond van Barneveld; 93.78
Michael van Gerwen (Netherlands); 100.80	7–2	(England) Rob Cross; 98.85
Peter Wright (Scotland); 92.93	6–6	(Wales) Gerwyn Price; 93.51
Night's Average: (Note: Please note these are not calculated properly and are not indicative of actual averages for each night.) 95.49
Highest Checkout: (Australia) Simon Whitlock 160
Most 180s: (Northern Ireland) Daryl Gurney 5
Night's 180s: 25

=== 8 February – week 2 (Phase 1) ===
(Wales) Cardiff International Arena, Cardiff

	Score	
Michael Smith (England); 99.15	7–4	(Northern Ireland) Daryl Gurney; 101.96
Rob Cross (England); 87.74	1–7	(Australia) Simon Whitlock; 93.14
Michael van Gerwen (Netherlands); 101.12	5–7	(Scotland) Peter Wright; 101.04
Gerwyn Price (Wales); 92.71	3–7	(Scotland) Gary Anderson; 99.22
Raymond van Barneveld (Netherlands); 100.39	7–5	(Austria) Mensur Suljović; 102.55
Night's Average: 97.90
Highest Checkout: (Netherlands) Michael van Gerwen 170
Most 180s: (Scotland) Gary Anderson 5
Night's 180s: 28

=== 15 February – week 3 (Phase 1) ===
(England) Newcastle Arena, Newcastle

	Score	
Mensur Suljović (Austria); 91.15	2–7	(England) Michael Smith; 94.80
Daryl Gurney (Northern Ireland); 95.97	6–6	(Wales) Gerwyn Price; 93.22
Peter Wright (Scotland); 102.32	4–7	(England) Rob Cross; 98.46
Gary Anderson (Scotland); 110.79	3–7	(Netherlands) Michael van Gerwen; 110.62
Simon Whitlock (Australia); 94.34	7–4	(Netherlands) Raymond van Barneveld; 93.29
Night's Average: 98.50
Highest Checkout: (Scotland) Gary Anderson 170
Most 180s: (Netherlands) Michael van Gerwen 7
Night's 180s: 32

=== 22 February – Week 4 (Phase 1) ===
(Germany) Mercedes-Benz Arena, Berlin

	Score	
Michael Smith (England); 87.32	7–3	(Australia) Simon Whitlock; 85.60
Gerwyn Price (Wales); 90.87	3–7	(Austria) Mensur Suljović; 106.20
Michael van Gerwen (Netherlands); 103.42	7–2	(Northern Ireland) Daryl Gurney; 96.90
Rob Cross (England); 96.46	7–3	(Netherlands) Raymond van Barneveld; 88.60
Peter Wright (Scotland); 104.65	6–6	(Scotland) Gary Anderson; 105.25
Night's Average: 96.53
Highest Checkout: (Scotland) Gary Anderson 150
Most 180s: (Scotland) Gary Anderson & (England) Michael Smith 5
Night's 180s: 31

=== 1 March – Initial Week 5 Cancelled ===
(England) Westpoint Exeter, Exeter

The scheduled 5th week was cancelled due to Storm Emma. The matches, which were scheduled to be played that day, were instead played in Week 9 in Liverpool, with that week's games now being Judgement Night. In order to complete the schedule within the timescale, two rounds of Phase 2 were played on Wednesday 18 April and Thursday 19 April (Week 11) in the Rotterdam Ahoy complex.

=== 8 March – Week 5 (Phase 1) ===
(England) First Direct Arena, Leeds

	Score	
Michael van Gerwen (Netherlands); 100.17	7–4	(Australia) Simon Whitlock; 92.28
Gerwyn Price (Wales); 89.01	5–7	(Netherlands) Raymond van Barneveld; 91.65
Peter Wright (Scotland); 91.54	1–7	(Austria) Mensur Suljović; 103.01
Gary Anderson (Scotland); 99.54	6–6	(Northern Ireland) Daryl Gurney; 94.62
Rob Cross (England); 96.22	7–5	(England) Michael Smith; 92.61
Night's Average: 95.07
Highest Checkout: (England) Rob Cross & (Netherlands) Raymond van Barneveld 121
Most 180s: (England) Rob Cross 5
Night's 180s: 24

=== 15 March – Week 6 (Phase 1) ===
(England) Nottingham Arena, Nottingham

	Score	
Michael Smith (England); 95.02	7–1	(Scotland) Peter Wright; 82.91
Simon Whitlock (Australia); 96.38	6–6	(Northern Ireland) Daryl Gurney; 99.11
Mensur Suljović (Austria); 94.65	2–7	(England) Rob Cross; 106.49
Gerwyn Price (Wales); 92.64	3–7	(Netherlands) Michael van Gerwen; 104.80
Raymond van Barneveld (Netherlands); 92.48	6–6	(Scotland) Gary Anderson; 93.67
Night's Average: 96.15
Highest Checkout: (Netherlands) Michael van Gerwen 152
Most 180s: (Northern Ireland) Daryl Gurney & (Netherlands) Raymond van Barneveld 4
Night's 180s: 22

=== 22 March – Week 7 (Phase 1) ===
(Scotland) SSE Hydro, Glasgow

	Score	
Daryl Gurney (Northern Ireland); 98.63	7–3	(Austria) Mensur Suljović; 96.26
Michael van Gerwen (Netherlands); 101.56	7–2	(England) Michael Smith; 92.41
Gary Anderson (Scotland); 102.68	7–4	(Australia) Simon Whitlock; 104.13
Peter Wright (Scotland); 88.18	1–7	(Netherlands) Raymond van Barneveld; 99.76
Rob Cross (England); 102.57	7–1	(Wales) Gerwyn Price; 92.42
Night's Average: 97.86
Highest Checkout: (Netherlands) Michael van Gerwen 148
Most 180s: (Scotland) Gary Anderson 6
Night's 180s: 22

=== 29 March – Week 8 (Phase 1) ===
(Northern Ireland) SSE Arena, Belfast

	Score	
Mensur Suljović (Austria); 97.94	5–7	(Scotland) Gary Anderson; 96.91
Michael Smith (England); 93.84	7–2	(Wales) Gerwyn Price; 87.44
Raymond van Barneveld (Netherlands); 96.82	2–7	(Netherlands) Michael van Gerwen; 104.47
Daryl Gurney (Northern Ireland); 98.53	7–5	(England) Rob Cross; 100.16
Simon Whitlock (Australia); 98.20	6–6	(Scotland) Peter Wright; 98.64
Night's Average: 97.29
Highest Checkout: (England) Michael Smith 160
Most 180s: (Northern Ireland) Daryl Gurney 9
Night's 180s: 36

=== 5 April – Week 9 (Phase 1 – Judgement Night) ===
(England) Liverpool Arena, Liverpool

The night was overshadowed by the sudden death of 5 time World Champion Eric Bristow, who suffered a heart attack outside the venue. His death was announced during the Gurney v Wright match. The crowd paid tribute to Bristow at the end of the night's play.

	Score	
Simon Whitlock (Australia); 81.94	7–3	(Wales) Gerwyn Price; 76.94
Raymond van Barneveld (Netherlands); 96.58	0–7	(England) Michael Smith; 103.15
Gary Anderson (Scotland); 95.09	5–7	(England) Rob Cross; 92.30
Mensur Suljović (Austria); 95.39	4–7	(Netherlands) Michael van Gerwen; 106.34
Daryl Gurney (Northern Ireland); 98.67	6–6	(Scotland) Peter Wright; 99.78
Night's Average: 94.62
Highest Checkout: (Australia) Simon Whitlock 164
Most 180s: (Netherlands) Michael van Gerwen 10
Night's 180s: 36

=== 12 April – week 10 (Phase 2) ===
(England) Sheffield Arena, Sheffield

	Score	
Raymond van Barneveld (Netherlands); 94.16	3–7	(Northern Ireland) Daryl Gurney; 102.76
Gary Anderson (Scotland); 104.26	7–2	(Scotland) Peter Wright; 96.22
Simon Whitlock (Australia); 89.58	1–7	(Netherlands) Michael van Gerwen; 102.37
Michael Smith (England); 96.34	5–7	(England) Rob Cross; 106.26
Raymond van Barneveld (Netherlands); 86.78	2–7	(Scotland) Peter Wright; 95.16
Night's Average: 97.39
Highest Checkout: (Netherlands) Raymond van Barneveld 158
Most 180s: (Northern Ireland) Daryl Gurney 5
Night's 180s: 25

=== 18 April – week 11A (Double Header, Phase 2) ===
(Netherlands) Rotterdam Ahoy, Rotterdam

	Score	
Michael Smith (England); 96.00	2–7	(Scotland) Gary Anderson; 109.91
Rob Cross (England); 96.09	7–4	(Northern Ireland) Daryl Gurney; 91.71
Raymond van Barneveld (Netherlands); 101.44	7–3	(Australia) Simon Whitlock; 89.49
Peter Wright (Scotland); 99.08	7–5	(Netherlands) Michael van Gerwen; 106.87
Rob Cross (England); 98.22	3–7	(Scotland) Gary Anderson; 99.87
Night's Average: 99.82
Highest Checkout: (Netherlands) Michael van Gerwen 148
Most 180s: (Scotland) Gary Anderson & (England) Rob Cross 7
Night's 180s: 27

=== 19 April – week 11B (Double Header, Phase 2) ===
(Netherlands) Rotterdam Ahoy, Rotterdam

	Score	
Simon Whitlock (Australia); 90.58	1–7	(England) Michael Smith; 97.46
Daryl Gurney (Northern Ireland); 93.00	3–7	(Scotland) Gary Anderson; 109.73
Rob Cross (England); 96.44	6–6	(Scotland) Peter Wright; 92.22
Michael van Gerwen (Netherlands); 103.73	5–7	(Netherlands) Raymond van Barneveld; 95.21
Daryl Gurney (Northern Ireland); 99.20	7–1	(Australia) Simon Whitlock; 85.28
Night's Average: 96.29
Highest Checkout: (Scotland) Gary Anderson 170
Most 180s: (Northern Ireland) Daryl Gurney 7
Night's 180s: 32

=== 26 April – week 12 (Phase 2) ===
(England) Manchester Arena, Manchester

	Score	
Peter Wright (Scotland); 97.86	1–7	(England) Michael Smith; 104.86
Daryl Gurney (Northern Ireland); 100.16	6–6	(Netherlands) Michael van Gerwen; 104.96
Simon Whitlock (Australia); 96.78	7–5	(Scotland) Gary Anderson; 94.45
Raymond van Barneveld (Netherlands); 94.02	6–6	(England) Rob Cross; 94.55
Michael Smith (England); 96.28	1–7	(Netherlands) Michael van Gerwen; 94.76
Night's Average: 97.87
Highest Checkout: (Northern Ireland) Daryl Gurney 156
Most 180s: (Netherlands) Michael van Gerwen 7
Night's 180s: 30

=== 3 May – week 13 (Phase 2) ===
(England) Arena Birmingham, Birmingham

	Score	
Peter Wright (Scotland); 93.05	7–4	(Australia) Simon Whitlock; 90.68
Rob Cross (England); 101.71	2–7	(Netherlands) Michael van Gerwen; 111.57
Daryl Gurney (Northern Ireland); 98.82	6–6	(England) Michael Smith; 99.36
Gary Anderson (Scotland); 96.64	3–7	(Netherlands) Raymond van Barneveld; 100.11
Night's Average: 98.99
Highest Checkout: (Northern Ireland) Daryl Gurney 167
Most 180s: (Northern Ireland) Daryl Gurney 6
Night's 180s: 17

=== 10 May – week 14 (Phase 2) ===
(Scotland) AECC Arena, Aberdeen

	Score	
Michael Smith (England); 93.45	6–6	(Netherlands) Raymond van Barneveld; 97.28
Simon Whitlock (Australia); 88.38	6–6	(England) Rob Cross; 89.86
Peter Wright (Scotland); 98.11	6–6	(Northern Ireland) Daryl Gurney; 88.05
Michael van Gerwen (Netherlands); 100.41	5–7	(Scotland) Gary Anderson; 98.28
Night's Average: 94.15
Highest Checkout: (Netherlands) Raymond van Barneveld 126
Most 180s: (England) Rob Cross 5
Night's 180s: 28

== Play-offs – 17 May ==
(England) The O2 Arena, London

	Score	
Semi-finals (best of 19 legs)
Michael van Gerwen (Netherlands); 103.65	10–6	(England) Rob Cross; 96.04
Michael Smith (England); 97.49	10–6	(Scotland) Gary Anderson; 95.35
Final (best of 21 legs)
Michael van Gerwen (Netherlands); 112.37	11–4	(England) Michael Smith; 97.01
Night's Total Average: 100.32
Highest Checkout: (Netherlands) Michael van Gerwen 128
Most 180s: (Netherlands) Michael van Gerwen 16
Night's 180s: 40

== Table and streaks ==
=== Table ===
After the first nine weeks (phase 1), the bottom two in the table are eliminated. In the next six weeks (phase 2) the eight remaining players each play a further seven matches. The top four players then compete in the playoffs.

Two points are awarded for a win and one point for a draw. When players are tied on points, leg difference is used first as a tie-breaker, after that legs won against throw and then tournament average.

#	Name	Matches					Legs				Scoring					
#	Name	Pld	W	D	L	Pts	LF	LA	+/-	LWAT	100+	140+	180s	A	HC	C%
1	(Netherlands) Michael van Gerwen W	16	11	1	4	23	103	60	+43	38	192	128	56	103.56	170	45.37%
2	(England) Michael Smith RU	16	9	2	5	20	90	66	+24	37	157	119	41	95.21	160	42.45%
3	(Scotland) Gary Anderson	16	8	3	5	19	95	80	+15	33	205	114	57	99.11	170	42.04%
4	(England) Rob Cross	16	8	3	5	19	87	82	+5	32	192	103	54	97.33	144	44.85%
5	(Northern Ireland) Daryl Gurney	16	4	8	4	16	89	88	+1	32	195	132	67	96.77	167	38.70%
6	(Netherlands) Raymond van Barneveld	16	6	4	6	16	80	88	–8	27	215	131	42	95.01	167	38.28%
7	(Scotland) Peter Wright	16	4	6	6	14	74	94	–20	27	226	142	31	96.17	132	39.78%
8	(Australia) Simon Whitlock	16	5	3	8	13	74	92	–18	26	169	105	43	92.77	164	37.00%
9	(Austria) Mensur Suljović	9	2	0	7	4	40	53	–13	12	153	87	14	99.06	138	44.44%
10	(Wales) Gerwyn Price	9	0	2	7	2	32	61	–29	12	112	53	11	89.67	148	32.99%

Last updated: 10 May 2018
Source: Match reports from the results section.

Top four will qualify for the Play-offs after Week 14.
NB: LWAT = Legs won against throw. A = Average. C% = Checkout percentage. HC = High checkout.

=== Streaks ===
Player	Phase 1, Weeks 1 to 9									Phase 2, Weeks 10 to 14										Play-offs	
Player	1	2	3	4	5	6	7	8	9	10		11A		11B		12		13	14	SF	F
(Netherlands) Michael van Gerwen	W	L	W	W	W	W	W	W	W	W		L		L		D	W	W	L	W	W
(England) Michael Smith	W	W	W	W	L	W	L	W	W	L		L		W		W	L	D	D	W	L
(Scotland) Gary Anderson	L	W	L	D	D	D	W	W	L	W		W	W	W		L		L	W	L	—N/a
(England) Rob Cross	L	L	W	W	W	W	W	L	W	W		W	L	D		D		L	D	L	—N/a
(Northern Ireland) Daryl Gurney	D	L	D	L	D	D	W	W	D	W		L		L	W	D		D	D	Eliminated	
(Netherlands) Raymond van Barneveld	D	W	L	L	W	D	W	L	L	L	L	W		W		D		W	D	Eliminated	
(Scotland) Peter Wright	D	W	L	D	L	L	L	D	D	L	W	W		D		L		W	D	Eliminated	
(Australia) Simon Whitlock	W	W	W	L	L	D	L	D	W	L		L		L	L	W		L	D	Eliminated	
(Austria) Mensur Suljović	L	L	L	W	W	L	L	L	L	Eliminated											
(Wales) Gerwyn Price	D	L	D	L	L	L	L	L	L	Eliminated											

Legend:	W	Win	D	Draw	L	Loss	—N/a	Eliminated

=== Positions by Week ===
Player	Phase 1, Weeks 1 to 9									Phase 2, Weeks 10 to 14					
Player	1	2	3	4	5	6	7	8	9	10	11A	11B	12	13	14
(Netherlands) Michael van Gerwen	1	5	3	2	1	1	1	1	1	1	1	1	1	1	1
(England) Michael Smith	3	2	2	1	2	2	2	2	2	2	4	4	2	2	2
(Scotland) Gary Anderson	9	6	6	6	7	6	5	4	5	4	3	2	4	4	3
(England) Rob Cross	10	10	9	5	4	3	3	3	3	3	2	3	3	3	4
(Northern Ireland) Daryl Gurney	6	7	7	9	9	8	7	7	6	5	5	5	5	5	5
(Netherlands) Raymond van Barneveld	4	3	5	7	5	5	4	6	7	7	7	6	6	6	6
(Scotland) Peter Wright	7	4	4	4	8	9	9	8	8	8	8	7	8	7	7
(Australia) Simon Whitlock	2	1	1	3	3	4	6	5	4	6	6	8	7	8	8
(Austria) Mensur Suljović	8	9	10	8	6	7	8	9	9	Eliminated					
(Wales) Gerwyn Price	5	8	8	10	10	10	10	10	10	Eliminated					
