= Rob Cross =

English darts player (born 1990)

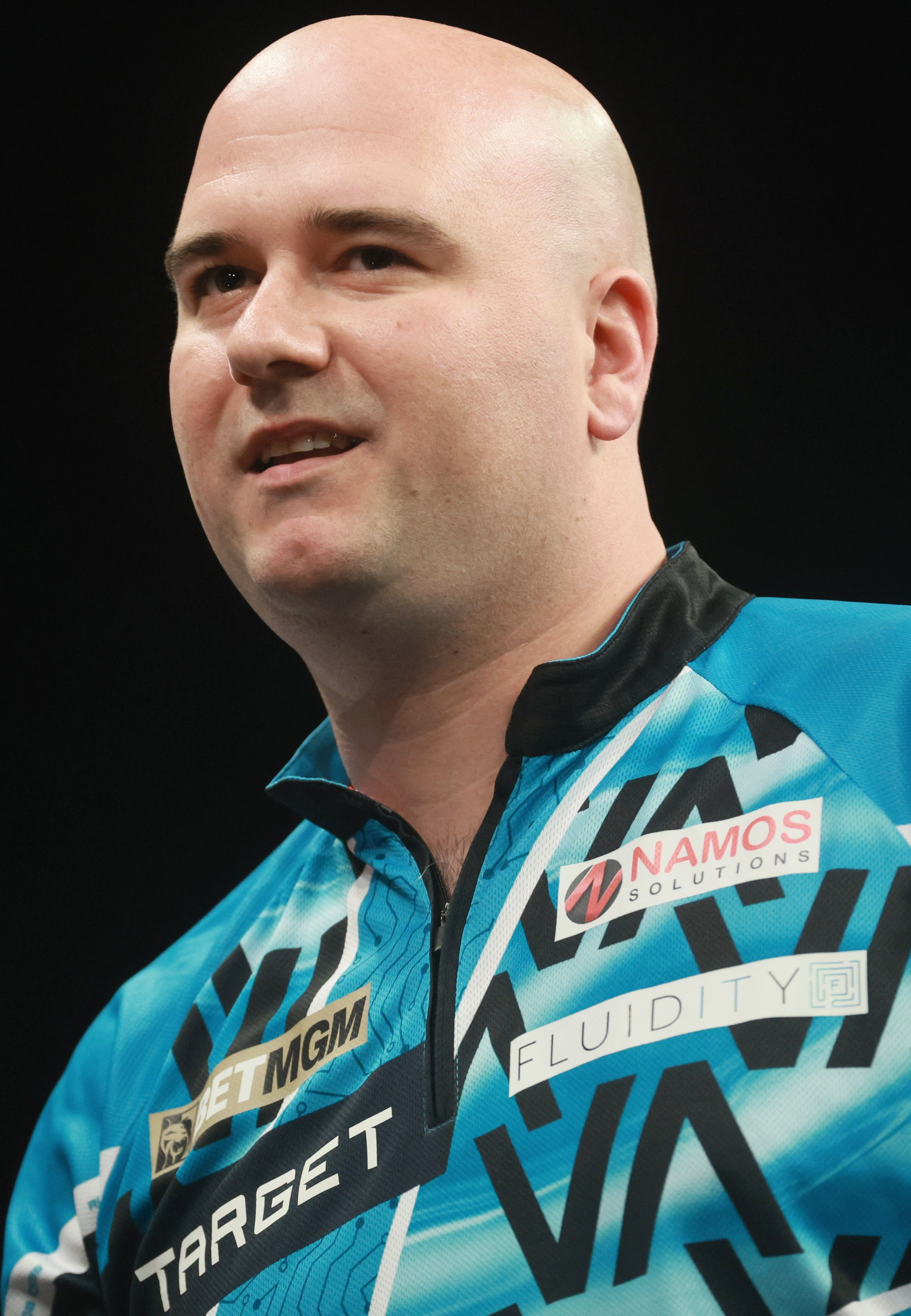
- Cross in 2025

Personal information
- Full name: Robert Cross
- Nickname: "Voltage"
- Born: 21 September 1990 (age 36) Pembury, Kent, England
- Home town: Hastings, East Sussex, England

Sport
- Sport: Darts
- Playing since: 2001
- Darts: 21.5g Target Signature Gen 1
- Laterality: Right-handed
- Walk-on music: "Movin' to the Sun" by Hugel

Organisation (see split in darts)
- BDO: 2015–2016
- PDC: 2016–present (Tour Card: 2017–present)
- WDF: 2015–2016
- Current world ranking: (PDC) 24 (5 November 2026)

WDF major events – best performances
- World Masters: Last 48: 2015

PDC premier events – best performances
- World Championship: Winner (1): 2018
- World Matchplay: Winner (1): 2019
- World Grand Prix: Quarter-final: 2024
- UK Open: Runner-up: 2019
- Grand Slam: Runner-up: 2023
- European Championship: Winner (2): 2019, 2021
- Premier League: Runner-up: 2019
- PC Finals: Runner-up: 2022
- Masters: Runner-up: 2023
- Champions League: Group Stage: 2018, 2019
- World Series Finals: Runner-up: 2020

Other tournament wins
- Years
PDC Challenge Tour	2016 (×3)
European Tour Events (×2)
Baltic Sea Darts Open	2024
European Darts Grand Prix	2023
Players Championships (×11)
2017 (×4), 2018, 2021, 2022 (×2), 2023, 2025, 2026
World Series of Darts (×5)
Brisbane Darts Masters	2018
Dutch Darts Masters	2025
New South Wales Darts Masters	2023
New Zealand Darts Masters	2023
US Darts Masters	2024

Robert Cross (born 21 September 1990) is an English professional darts player who competes in Professional Darts Corporation (PDC) events, where he reached a peak ranking of world number two in 2018 and 2019. Nicknamed "Voltage", Cross won the PDC World Darts Championship in 2018 after turning professional less than a year beforehand. He has won three other PDC major titles: the 2019 World Matchplay and the European Championship in 2019 and 2021. Cross has won a total of 22 PDC titles.

Before turning professional in 2017, Cross reached the last 32 of the 2016 UK Open, losing there to Michael van Gerwen. He won four titles on the PDC Challenge Tour in 2016, which earned him his PDC Tour Card. Cross won his first four PDC ranking titles in his first year on tour, followed by his maiden World Championship win in 2018, where he defeated Phil Taylor 7–2 in the final. Outside of his four major victories, Cross has won five World Series of Darts titles, two European Tour titles, and 11 Players Championships. He has also represented England at the PDC World Cup of Darts four times, reaching the final of the 2020 edition alongside teammate Michael Smith.

== BDO career ==
=== 2015 ===
In October 2015, Cross attempted to qualify for the 2016 BDO World Darts Championship, where he was knocked out in the last 64 by Tony Martin. He also competed in the 2015 World Masters, losing to Darius Labanauskas in the last 48.

== PDC career ==
=== 2016 ===
Cross competed in the 2016 UK Open as an amateur Rileys qualifier; making it to the last 32 before falling to world number one Michael van Gerwen, who achieved a nine-dart finish in the process. Following this, he competed in the PDC Challenge Tour, winning three of the 16 events and ultimately topping the Order of Merit, consequently earning a Tour Card for the 2017 PDC Pro Tour.

=== 2017 ===
At the 2017 UK Open, Cross reached the fifth round before being knocked out by the eventual winner Peter Wright. The following week, he won his first PDC title by defeating Mervyn King 6–5 in the final of the third Players Championship. His first year on the tour continued positively, winning the 12th event with a 6–5 victory over Ian White, who missed five darts for the title. Cross then beat Peter Wright 6–2 in the 19th Players Championship in Dublin and quickly added his 4th Players Championship (PC21) with a 6–3 win against Adrian Lewis to move into the top 32 for the first time.

Cross reached the final of two events in the 2017 PDC European Tour, the German Darts Grand Prix and the European Darts Trophy, both times losing to Michael van Gerwen. He reached his first premier event final in October at the 2017 European Championship, again losing to van Gerwen.

=== 2018 ===
Cross made his PDC World Darts Championship debut as the 20th seed. He reached the final at the event, beating Phil Taylor 7–2 on New Year's Day 2018, following wins over Seigo Asada, Michael Smith (in which Cross survived two match darts), John Henderson, Dimitri Van den Bergh and Michael van Gerwen (in which Cross survived six match darts). In the final he defeated Taylor, who had previously announced that he would retire after the tournament, 7–2 in sets. He is the only player to have survived match darts in two rounds and then go on to win the World title. Winning the World Championship meant that he finished at number 3 in the PDC Order of Merit and earned automatic qualification for the 2018 Premier League Darts.

Cross was tipped by a few pundits to have an off year as they thought that the pressure of being world champion would get to him, despite this he made a good showing on his Premier League debut making it to the semi-finals. However, he only won one players' championship title in comparison to 2017 where he won 4, he won players' championship 13 by defeating Peter Wright in the final and he won his first World Series event which was the Brisbane Darts Masters by defeating Michael Van Gerwen 10–6 in the final. He had made two previous World Series finals that year: Las Vegas and Shanghai.

=== 2019 ===
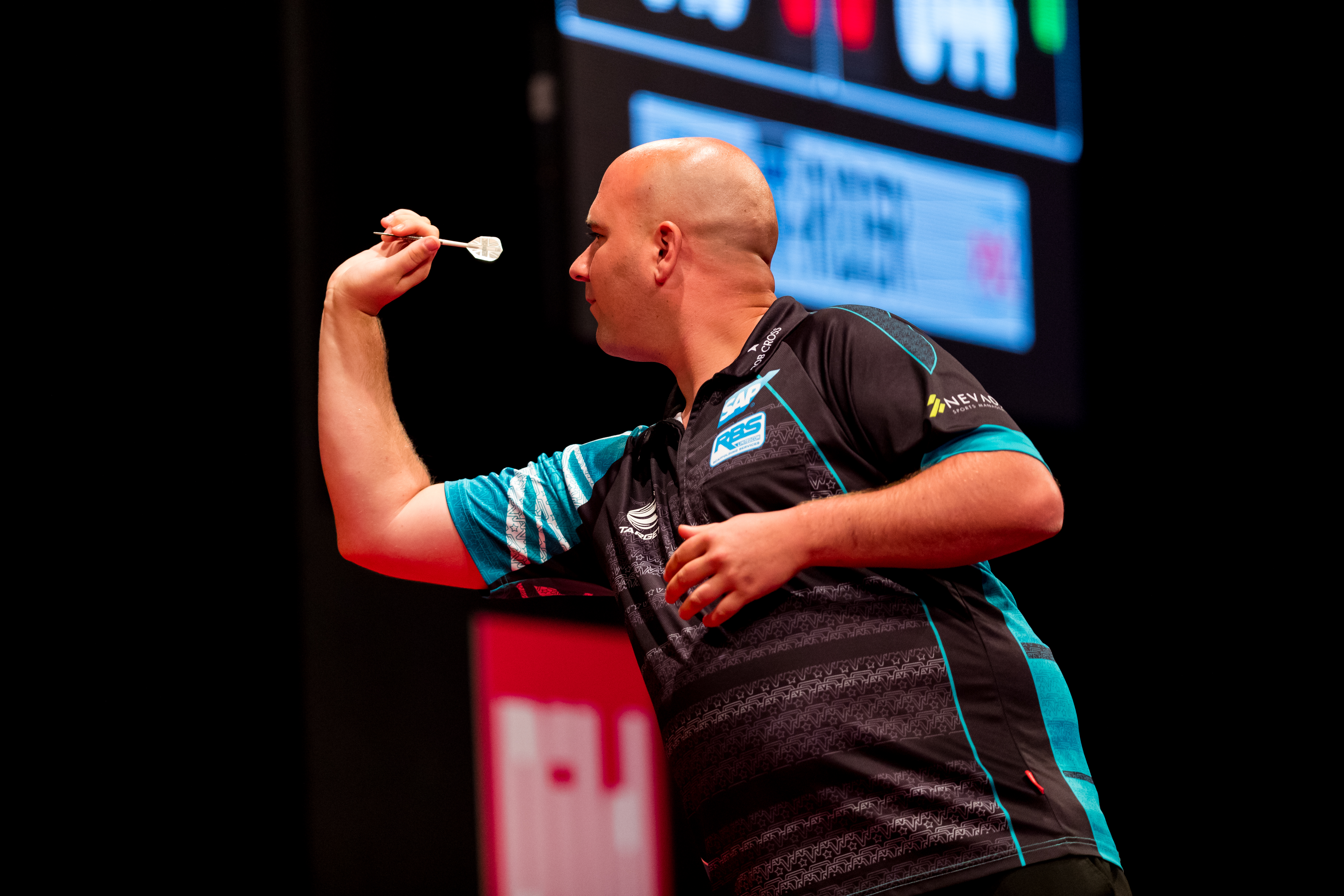
Cross at the 2019 European Darts Matchplay

In defence of his world title at the 2019 World Championship, Cross lost to Luke Humphries 4–2 in the fourth round.

Cross made his 3rd major final and 6th televised final at the 2019 UK Open in Minehead. Cross was the eventual runner-up at the tournament, as he lost to Nathan Aspinall 11–5.

Cross made his second televised final of the year (4th major, 7th televised) at the 2019 Premier League Darts. After finishing 2nd in the league format, Cross went to the O2 in London for the Play-Offs. He took on James Wade in the semi-final and was successful in victory. He then took on World No. 1, Michael van Gerwen in the final, losing 11–6.

He won the World Matchplay, defeating Michael Smith 18–13 in legs in the final. Cross became only the fourth player to ever win the World Championship and World Matchplay (previously achieved by Phil Taylor, Michael van Gerwen and Gary Anderson). On his way to the final he beat Chris Dobey 10–3, Krzysztof Ratajski 11–5, Stephen Bunting 16–14 and Daryl Gurney 17–15, (from 15–9 down in the semi-finals).

Cross reached his 4th World Series final at the 2019 Brisbane Darts Masters. He lost to Damon Heta in a last leg decider 8–7.

On 27 October, Cross won his 3rd PDC major title, the 2019 European Championship, beating Gerwyn Price 11–6 in the final.

=== 2020 ===
Cross was eliminated in the second round of the 2020 World Championship, winning only two legs in a 3–0 loss to Kim Huybrechts.

At the World Series of Darts Finals, Cross beat Michael Smith and James Wade en route to the final, before eventually succumbing to Gerwyn Price. Cross and Michael Smith, representing England, reached the final of the World Cup of Darts, where they were defeated 3–0 by Wales (Gerwyn Price and Jonny Clayton).

=== 2021 ===
Cross suffered another early exit at the 2021 World Championship, losing to Dirk van Duijvenbode 3–2 in the second round.

Cross won his fourth PDC major title at the 2021 European Championship, beating Michael van Gerwen in the final 11–8 to win the tournament for a second time.

=== 2022 ===
At the 2022 World Championship, Cross started his campaign with a 3–1 win against Raymond van Barneveld. In the next round, he beat Daryl Gurney in a deciding set, finishing the match with a 170 checkout. He was defeated 4–3 by Gary Anderson in the fourth round.

Cross was unsuccessful in his defence of the European Championship, losing to James Wade 6–5 in the first round. Cross reached the final of the Players Championship Finals but lost 11–6 to Michael van Gerwen.

=== 2023 ===
At the 2023 World Championship Cross reached the fourth round, losing to Chris Dobey 4–2. He was the runner-up at the Masters where he again lost to Dobey.

After seven previous losses in PDC European Tour finals, Cross won his first European Tour title at the 2023 European Darts Grand Prix, defeating Luke Humphries 8–6 in the final. He also won back-to-back titles on the 2023 World Series of Darts, winning the New Zealand Darts Masters and the New South Wales Darts Masters.

At the Grand Slam, Cross was the runner-up, losing the final to Luke Humphries 16–8.

=== 2024 ===
At the 2024 World Championship, Cross whitewashed Thibault Tricole in his second-round match 3–0, won against Jeffrey de Graaf 4–2 in the third round, whitewashed Jonny Clayton 4–0 in the fourth round and came back from four sets down to defeat Chris Dobey 5–4 to reach the semi-finals. He lost his semi-final to Luke Littler 6–2.

In May, Cross defeated Luke Humphries 8–6 in the final of the Baltic Sea Darts Open to win his second European Tour title. He also won the US Darts Masters, winning a last-leg decider to beat Gerwyn Price 8–7.

=== 2025 ===
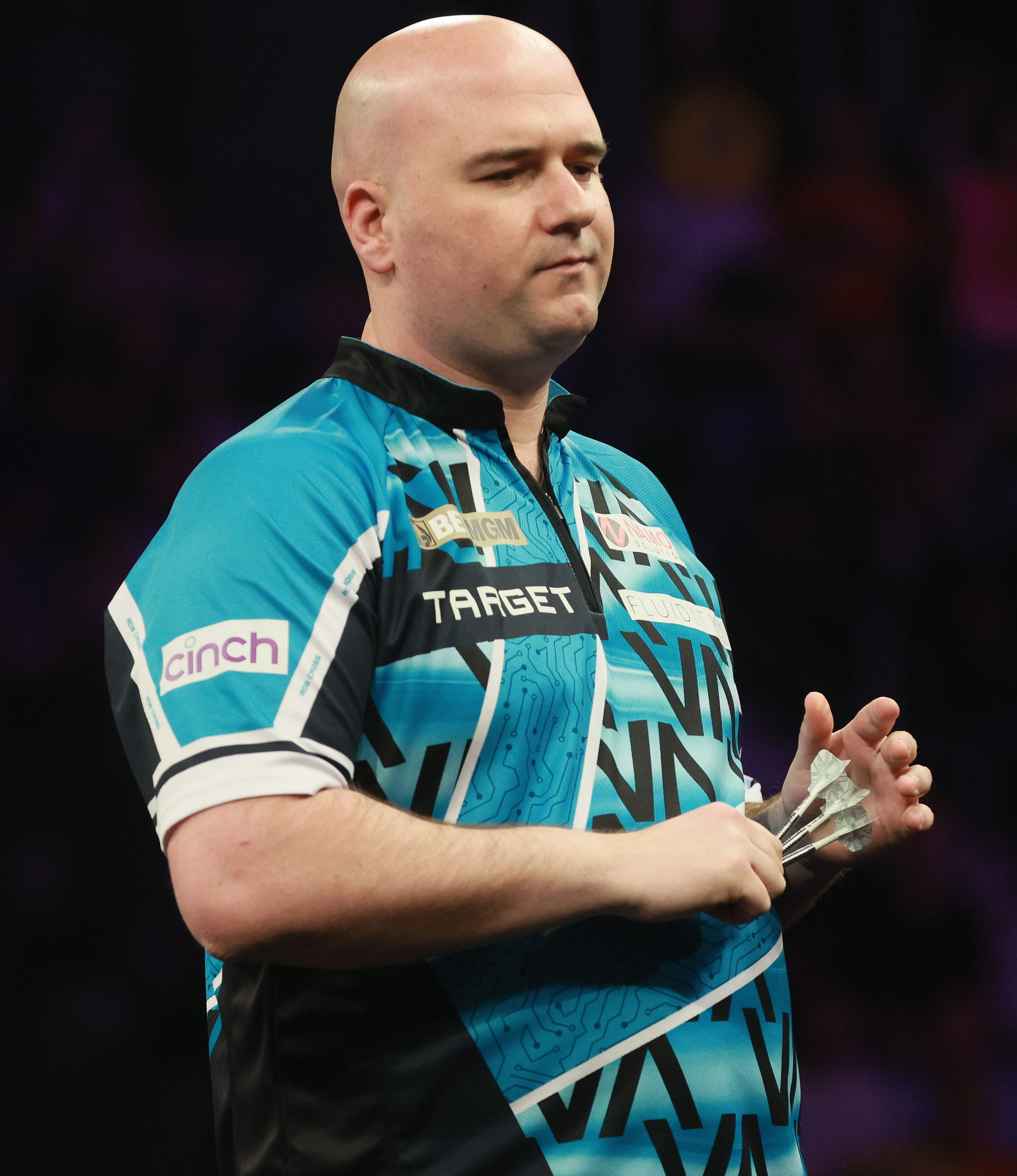
Cross on night nine of the 2025 Premier League

Cross suffered an early exit at the 2025 World Championship, losing 3–1 to Scott Williams in the second round.

Cross won his fifth World Series title at the 2025 Dutch Darts Masters, defeating Stephen Bunting 8–5 in the final. It was his first World Series title in Europe. He was victorious in the first Pro Tour event of the year, Players Championship 1, with a 7–3 win over Andrew Gilding in the semi-finals before beating Joe Cullen 8–3 in the final. Cross achieved his first televised nine-dart finish on night five of the 2025 Premier League in his 6–5 semi-final loss to Nathan Aspinall. He finished the league stage of the Premier League in seventh place on 14 points.

=== 2026 ===
At the 2026 World Championship, Cross reached the fourth round before losing 4–2 to defending champion Luke Littler. Cross was also omitted from the 2026 Premier League lineup, which saw him miss out on a place in the tournament for the first time since 2023. He reached the quarter-final of the UK Open, losing in a deciding leg to James Wade. Cross won his first title of the year at Players Championship 22, where he defeated Maik Kuivenhoven 8–5 in the final. He then reached the final of the Slovak Darts Open, losing 8–3 to Wessel Nijman.

== Personal life ==
Cross has four children. He spent the majority of his early life living in Edenbridge, Kent. He was an electrician before turning professional. His nickname, "Voltage", comes from his former profession.

In June 2025, Cross was disqualified from being a company director for five years for failing to pay more than £450,000 in taxes. The Insolvency Service found that he had withdrawn over £300,000 from his company that should have gone to creditors.

In a 2025 interview, Cross revealed he has attention deficit hyperactivity disorder (ADHD).

== World Championship results ==
=== PDC ===
- 2018: Winner (beat Phil Taylor 7–2)
- 2019: Fourth round (lost to Luke Humphries 2–4)
- 2020: Second round (lost to Kim Huybrechts 0–3)
- 2021: Second round (lost to Dirk van Duijvenbode 2–3)
- 2022: Fourth round (lost to Gary Anderson 3–4)
- 2023: Fourth round (lost to Chris Dobey 2–4)
- 2024: Semi-finals (lost to Luke Littler 2–6)
- 2025: Second round (lost to Scott Williams 1–3)
- 2026: Fourth round (lost to Luke Littler 2–4)

== Career finals ==
=== PDC major finals: 11 (4 titles) ===
Legend
World Championship (1–0)
World Matchplay (1–0)
Grand Slam (0–1)
Premier League (0–1)
UK Open (0–1)
Masters (0–1)
European Championship (2–1)
Players Championship Finals (0–1)
World Series of Darts Finals (0–1)

Outcome	No.	Year	Championship	Opponent in the final	Score (Note: (l) = score in legs, (s) = score in sets, (m) = score in matches.)	Ref.
Runner-up	1.	2017	European Championship	Michael van Gerwen	7–11 (l)	
Winner	1.	2018	World Championship	Phil Taylor	7–2 (s)	
Runner-up	2.	2019	UK Open	Nathan Aspinall	5–11 (l)	
Runner-up	3.	2019	Premier League	Michael van Gerwen	5–11 (l)	
Winner	2.	2019	World Matchplay	Michael Smith	18–13 (l)	
Winner	3.	2019	European Championship	Gerwyn Price	11–6 (l)	
Runner-up	4.	2020	World Series of Darts Finals	Gerwyn Price	9–11 (l)	
Winner	4.	2021	European Championship (2)	Michael van Gerwen	11–8 (l)	
Runner-up	5.	2022	Players Championship Finals	Michael van Gerwen	6–11 (l)	
Runner-up	6.	2023	Masters	Chris Dobey	7–11 (l)	
Runner-up	7.	2023	Grand Slam	Luke Humphries	8–16 (l)	

=== PDC World Series finals: 11 (5 titles) ===
Outcome	No.	Year	Championship	Opponent in the final	Score
Runner-up	1.	2018	US Darts Masters	Gary Anderson	4–8 (l)
Runner-up	2.	2018	Shanghai Darts Masters	Michael Smith	2–8 (l)
Winner	1.	2018	Brisbane Darts Masters	Michael van Gerwen	11–6 (l)
Runner-up	3.	2019	Brisbane Darts Masters	Damon Heta	7–8 (l)
Winner	2.	2023	New Zealand Darts Masters	Nathan Aspinall	8–7 (l)
Winner	3.	2023	New South Wales Darts Masters	Damon Heta	8–1 (l)
Winner	4.	2024	US Darts Masters	Gerwyn Price	8–7 (l)
Runner-up	4.	2024	Nordic Darts Masters	Gerwyn Price	5–8 (l)
Runner-up	5.	2024	Poland Darts Masters	Luke Littler	3–8 (l)
Winner	5.	2025	Dutch Darts Masters	Stephen Bunting	8–5 (l)
Runner-up	6.	2025	Nordic Darts Masters (2)	Stephen Bunting	4–8 (l)

=== PDC team finals: 1 ===
Outcome	No.	Year	Championship	Team	Teammate	Opponents in the final	Score
Runner-up	1.	2020	World Cup of Darts	England	Michael Smith	Wales – Gerwyn Price and Jonny Clayton	0–3 (m)

== Performance timeline ==
Tournament	2016	2017	2018	2019	2020	2021	2022	2023	2024	2025	2026
PDC Ranked televised events
World Championship	DNP		W	4R	2R	2R	4R	4R	SF	2R	4R
World Masters (Note: Before 2025 this was a non-ranked event.)	DNP		QF	1R	1R	2R	2R	F	2R	1R	2R
UK Open	4R	5R	QF	F	QF	5R	4R	QF	QF	6R	QF
World Matchplay	DNP	2R	2R	W	1R	2R	2R	1R	QF	1R	2R
World Grand Prix	DNP	1R	1R	2R	1R	2R	1R	1R	QF	2R	1R
European Championship	DNP	F	QF	W	1R	W	1R	2R	1R	1R	1R
Grand Slam	DNP	QF	2R	2R	2R	QF	2R	F	QF	DNQ	2R
Players Championship Finals	DNP	SF	1R	3R	2R	3R	F	2R	1R	1R	
PDC Non-ranked televised events
Premier League	DNP		SF	F	9th	9th	DNP		6th	7th	DNP
Champions League	DNP	DNQ	RR	RR	Not held						
World Cup	DNQ		QF	2R	F	DNQ		QF	DNQ		
World Series Finals	DNQ	QF	2R	2R	F	DNP		QF	QF	2R	1R
Career statistics
Season-end ranking	173	3	2	4	4	10	6	6	4	20	

=== PDC European Tour ===
Season	1	2	3	4	5	6	7	8	9	10	11	12	13	14	15
2017	DNQ		GDO; QF	EDG; QF	GDT; QF	EDM; DNQ	ADO; 2R	EDO; QF	DDM; 3R	GDG; F	IDO; 2R	EDT; F			
2018	EDO; 3R	GDG; QF	GDO; SF	ADO; QF	EDG; 3R	DDM; WD	GDT; QF	DDO; 3R	EDM; 2R	GDC; QF	DDC; DNP	IDO; DNP	EDT; QF		
2019	EDO; F	GDC; 3R	GDG; SF	GDO; SF	ADO; 3R	EDG; 2R	DDM; WD	DDO; 2R	CDO; DNP	ADC; DNP	EDM; QF	IDO; F	GDT; 3R		
2020	BDC; 3R	GDC; 3R	EDG; QF	IDO; 2R											
2021	HDT; 3R	GDT; 2R													
2022	IDO; 1R	GDC; F	GDG; 3R	ADO; QF	EDO; 2R	CDO; F	EDG; F	DDC; 2R	EDM; QF	HDT; 2R	GDO; 3R	BDO; 3R	GDT; SF		
2023	BSD; 2R	EDO; SF	IDO; QF	GDG; 2R	ADO; 3R	DDC; 2R	BDO; 3R	CDO; SF	EDG; W	EDM; 3R	GDO; 2R	HDT; 2R	GDC; QF		
2024	BDO; F	GDG; 3R	IDO; 3R	EDG; SF	ADO; 2R	BSD; W	DDC; DNP	EDO; 2R	GDC; DNP	FDT; DNP	HDT; 3R	SDT; 3R	CDO; WD		
2025	BDO; 2R	EDT; 3R	IDO; WD	GDG; 3R	ADO; DNP	EDG; 3R	DDC; WD	EDO; WD	BSD; 2R	FDT; 2R	CDO; 3R	HDT; 3R	SDT; QF	GDC; 2R	
2026	PDO; DNQ	EDT; 2R	BDO; DNQ	GDG; DNQ	EDG; 1R	ADO; SF	IDO; SF	BSD; 1R	SDO; F	EDO; 1R	HDT; 3R	CDO; 1R	FDT; 3R	SDT; 3R	DDC; WD

=== PDC World Series of Darts ===
Season	1	2	3	4	5	6	7
2018	GER; QF	USA; F	SHA; F	AUC; QF	MEL; QF	BRI; W	
2019	USA; QF	GER; QF	BRI; F	MEL; SF	NZE; SF		
2023	BAH; SF	NOR; QF	USA; SF	POL; 1R	NSW; W	NZE; W	
2024	BAH; QF	DUT; 1R	USA; W	NOR; F	POL; F	AUS; QF	NZE; QF
2025	BAH; 1R	DUT; W	NOR; F	USA; 1R	POL; SF	AUS; DNP	NZE; DNP

=== PDC Players Championships ===
Season	1	2	3	4	5	6	7	8	9	10	11	12	13	14	15	16	17	18	19	20	21	22	23	24	25	26	27	28	29	30	31	32	33	34
2017	BAR; 1R	BAR; 3R	BAR; W	BAR; 3R	MIL; 4R	MIL; 3R	BAR; 1R	BAR; 3R	WIG; 3R	WIG; 3R	MIL; SF	MIL; W	WIG; SF	WIG; SF	BAR; 3R	BAR; 4R	BAR; 2R	BAR; 2R	DUB; W	DUB; 4R	BAR; W	BAR; 3R												
2018	BAR; QF	BAR; 2R	BAR; 4R	BAR; 2R	MIL; 1R	MIL; QF	BAR; 3R	BAR; DNP	WIG; 3R	WIG; 3R	MIL; DNP		WIG; W	WIG; F	BAR; QF	BAR; 3R	BAR; QF	BAR; 2R	DUB; 4R	DUB; SF	BAR; 1R	BAR; 2R												
2019	WIG; 2R	WIG; 4R	WIG; 3R	WIG; SF	BAR; 4R	BAR; 3R	WIG; 4R	WIG; DNP	BAR; 2R	Did not participate									BAR; 2R	BAR; QF	HIL; DNP		BAR; 4R	BAR; 1R	BAR; 1R	BAR; 4R	DUB; 4R	DUB; 2R	BAR; DNP					
2020	BAR; 4R	BAR; 1R	WIG; 1R	WIG; 2R	WIG; QF	WIG; 1R	BAR; 3R	BAR; 3R	MIL; 4R	MIL; 2R	MIL; 1R	MIL; F	MIL; 1R	NIE; 2R	NIE; 2R	NIE; 3R	NIE; 3R	NIE; 3R	COV; 3R	COV; 3R	COV; 1R	COV; 1R	COV; DNP											
2021	BOL; QF	BOL; 1R	BOL; 2R	BOL; 2R	MIL; 3R	MIL; 1R	MIL; 2R	MIL; 3R	NIE; 2R	NIE; 2R	NIE; QF	NIE; 1R	MIL; 1R	MIL; 4R	MIL; SF	MIL; QF	COV; 1R	COV; 2R	COV; 3R	COV; 2R	BAR; QF	BAR; 2R	BAR; 2R	BAR; QF	BAR; 4R	BAR; W	BAR; SF	BAR; SF	BAR; 2R	BAR; 3R				
2022	BAR; 2R	BAR; QF	WIG; 1R	WIG; QF	BAR; QF	BAR; 3R	NIE; SF	NIE; 4R	BAR; 4R	BAR; 3R	BAR; SF	BAR; 1R	BAR; QF	WIG; 1R	WIG; 4R	NIE; 2R	NIE; QF	BAR; 1R	BAR; 1R	BAR; 1R	BAR; 3R	BAR; 2R	BAR; 4R	BAR; W	BAR; 1R	BAR; 1R	BAR; W	BAR; 3R	BAR; QF	BAR; 3R				
2023	BAR; 3R	BAR; 3R	BAR; 3R	BAR; 3R	BAR; 1R	BAR; 2R	HIL; 1R	HIL; 1R	WIG; 1R	WIG; 2R	LEI; W	LEI; 4R	HIL; 1R	HIL; 2R	LEI; 3R	LEI; 2R	HIL; 3R	HIL; QF	BAR; 3R	BAR; QF	BAR; 2R	BAR; DNP			BAR; QF	BAR; 3R	BAR; 3R	BAR; 2R	BAR; SF	BAR; 4R				
2024	WIG; 2R	WIG; 2R	LEI; 1R	LEI; 1R	HIL; DNP		LEI; 2R	LEI; 4R	Did not participate						MIL; 2R	MIL; 1R	MIL; 2R	MIL; DNP		WIG; 4R	WIG; 1R	LEI; 4R	LEI; 4R	WIG; 4R	WIG; 2R	WIG; 3R	WIG; 4R	WIG; 2R	LEI; 3R	LEI; 1R				
2025	WIG; W	WIG; 1R	ROS; QF	ROS; 2R	LEI; 1R	LEI; 4R	HIL; DNP		LEI; 2R	LEI; 2R	Did not participate									LEI; SF	LEI; 2R	HIL; DNP		MIL; QF	MIL; 4R	HIL; DNP		LEI; 1R	LEI; 2R	LEI; DNP	WIG; 2R	WIG; 4R	WIG; 1R	WIG; 1R
2026	HIL; 3R	HIL; 3R	WIG; 3R	WIG; 2R	LEI; 1R	LEI; 3R	LEI; 2R	LEI; 1R	WIG; 2R	WIG; 1R	MIL; QF	MIL; 1R	HIL; 3R	HIL; 4R	LEI; 1R	LEI; 3R	LEI; 1R	LEI; 1R	MIL; SF	MIL; 3R	WIG; 2R	WIG; W	LEI; 3R	LEI; 4R	HIL; DNP		LEI; 4R	Did not participate					LEI; 2R	LEI; 1R

Performance Table Legend
W	Won the tournament	F	Finalist	SF	Semifinalist	QF	Quarterfinalist	#R; RR; Prel.	Lost in # round Round-robin; Preliminary round	DQ	Disqualified
DNQ	Did not qualify	DNP	Did not participate	WD	Withdrew	NH	Tournament not held	#R; RR; Prel.	Lost in # round Round-robin; Preliminary round	NYF	Not yet founded

== Nine-dart finishes ==
Rob Cross's televised nine-dart finishes
Date	Opponent	Tournament	Method	Ref.
6 March 2025	Nathan Aspinall	2025 Premier League Darts	3 x T20; 3 x T20; T19, T16, D18	
