= 2018 German Darts Masters =

Tournament information
- Dates: 25 May 2018
- Venue: Veltins-Arena
- Location: Gelsenkirchen
- Country: Germany
- Organisation(s): PDC
- Format: Legs
- Prize fund: £60,000
- Winner's share: £20,000
- High checkout: 167 (Scotland) Gary Anderson

Champion(s)
- (Austria) Mensur Suljović

The 2018 German Darts Masters was the second staging of the tournament by the Professional Darts Corporation, and was the first entry in the 2018 World Series of Darts. The tournament featured 16 players (eight PDC players facing eight regional qualifiers) and was held at the Veltins-Arena in Gelsenkirchen, Germany on 25 May 2018.

Peter Wright was the defending champion after defeating Phil Taylor 11–4 in the final of the 2017 event, but he lost 8–2 in the semi-finals to Mensur Suljović.

Suljović won his first World Series title by defeating Dimitri Van den Bergh 8–2 in the final.

The event also broke the attendance record for a darts tournament with 20,210 people attending the event, beating the previous record set 70 years earlier.

== Prize money ==
The total prize fund was £60,000.

Position (no. of players)		Prize money (Total: £60,000)
Winner	(1)	£20,000
Runner-up	(1)	£10,000
Semi-finalists	(2)	£5,000
Quarter-finalists	(4)	£2,500
First round	(8)	£1,250

== Qualifiers ==
The eight invited PDC representatives were:

1. (Netherlands) Michael van Gerwen (quarter-finals)
2. (Scotland) Peter Wright (semi-finals)
3. (England) Rob Cross (quarter-finals)
4. (Scotland) Gary Anderson (semi-finals)
5. (Austria) Mensur Suljović (champion)
6. (Netherlands) Raymond van Barneveld (quarter-finals)
7. (Wales) Jamie Lewis (quarter-finals)
8. (Belgium) Dimitri Van den Bergh (runner-up)

The German qualifiers were:

Qualification	Player
#1 Ranked German player	(Germany) Max Hopp (first round)
#2 Ranked German player	(Germany) Martin Schindler (first round)
#1 Ranked German Superleague Player	(Germany) Gabriel Clemens (first round)
#2 Ranked German Superleague Player	(Germany) Manfred Bilderl (first round)
#3 Ranked German Superleague Player	(Germany) Stefan Stoyke (first round)
#4 Ranked German Superleague Player	(Germany) Robert Marijanović (first round)
#5 Ranked German Superleague Player	(Germany) Nico Kurz (first round)
#6 Ranked German Superleague Player	(Germany) Dragutin Horvat (first round)

== Draw ==
First round (best of 11 legs); 25 May
1	(Netherlands) Michael van Gerwen 106.46	6
(Germany) Max Hopp 95.23	4
(Belgium) Dimitri Van den Bergh 109.98	6
(Germany) Martin Schindler 84.12	0
4	(Scotland) Gary Anderson 98.67	6
(Germany) Gabriel Clemens 87.46	2
(Wales) Jamie Lewis 89.46	6
(Germany) Nico Kurz 88.16	5
2	(Scotland) Peter Wright 96.86	6
(Germany) Dragutin Horvat 89.57	1
(Netherlands) Raymond van Barneveld 85.89	6
(Germany) Manfred Bilderl 77.06	0
3	(England) Rob Cross 84.44	6
(Germany) Stefan Stoyke 80.35	4
(Austria) Mensur Suljović 96.59	6
(Germany) Robert Marijanović 85.29	2

Quarter-finals (best of 15 legs); 25 May
1	(Netherlands) Michael van Gerwen 98.72	3
(Belgium) Dimitri Van den Bergh 94.35	8
4	(Scotland) Gary Anderson 102.65	8
(Wales) Jamie Lewis 98.40	6
2	(Scotland) Peter Wright 102.66	8
(Netherlands) Raymond van Barneveld 98.49	7
3	(England) Rob Cross 92.21	7
(Austria) Mensur Suljović 94.09	8

Semi-finals (best of 15 legs); 25 May
(Belgium) Dimitri Van den Bergh 92.47	8
4	(Scotland) Gary Anderson 98.76	7
2	(Scotland) Peter Wright 94.30	2
(Austria) Mensur Suljović 99.71	8

Final (best of 15 legs); 25 May
(Belgium) Dimitri Van den Bergh 86.66	2
(Austria) Mensur Suljović 101.63	8
