= 2018 Melbourne Darts Masters =

Tournament information
- Dates: 10–12 August 2018
- Venue: Hisense Arena
- Location: Melbourne
- Country: Australia
- Organisation(s): PDC
- Format: Legs
- Prize fund: £60,000
- Winner's share: £20,000
- High checkout: 170 (Australia) Simon Whitlock

Champion(s)
- (Scotland) Peter Wright

The 2018 Melbourne Darts Masters was the second staging of the tournament by the Professional Darts Corporation, as a fifth entry in the 2018 World Series of Darts. The tournament featured 16 players (eight PDC players facing eight regional qualifiers) and was held at the Hisense Arena in Melbourne from 10–12 August 2018.

Phil Taylor was the defending champion, defeating Peter Wright 11–8 in the 2017 final; however this would be Taylor's last televised title due to his retirement after the 2018 World Championship.

Wright avenged his defeat from the last tournament by winning his second World Series title after beating Michael Smith 11–8 in the final.

== Prize money ==
The total prize fund was £60,000.

Position (no. of players)		Prize money (Total: £60,000)
Winner	(1)	£20,000
Runner-up	(1)	£10,000
Semi-finalists	(2)	£5,000
Quarter-finalists	(4)	£2,500
First round	(8)	£1,250

== Qualifiers ==
The eight invited PDC representatives, (seeded according to the 2018 World Series of Darts Order of Merit) are:

1. (Netherlands) Michael van Gerwen (semi-finals)
2. (England) Rob Cross (quarter-finals)
3. (Scotland) Gary Anderson (semi-finals)
4. (Scotland) Peter Wright (champion)
5. (England) Michael Smith (runner-up)
6. (Netherlands) Raymond van Barneveld (quarter-finals)
7. (Australia) Simon Whitlock (quarter-finals)
8. (Australia) Kyle Anderson (first round)

The regional qualifiers are:

Qualification	Player
Wildcard	(Australia) Corey Cadby (first round)
2018 DPA World Series Order of Merit (First place)	(Australia) Tim Pusey (first round)
2018 DPA World Series Order of Merit (Second place)	(Australia) Raymond Smith (first round)
DPNZ Qualifier	(New Zealand) Haupai Puha (first round)
Winner of DPA Qualifier 1	(Australia) Damon Heta (quarter-finals)
Winner of DPA Qualifier 2	(Australia) Mike Bonser (first round)
Winner of DPA Qualifier 3	(Australia) Raymond O'Donnell (first round)
Winner of DPA Qualifier 4	(Australia) James Bailey (first round)

== Draw ==
First round (best of 11 legs); 10 August
1	(Netherlands) Michael van Gerwen 111.41	6
(Australia) Raymond Smith 90.94	1
(Australia) Simon Whitlock 94.41	6
(Australia) Corey Cadby 84.50	4
4	(Scotland) Peter Wright 99.10	6
(Australia) Mike Bonser 84.28	0
(Netherlands) Raymond van Barneveld 82.84	6
(Australia) Raymond O'Donnell 81.86	4
2	(England) Rob Cross 92.74	6
(New Zealand) Haupai Puha 91.86	2
(England) Michael Smith 92.46	6
(Australia) Tim Pusey 81.31	2
3	(Scotland) Gary Anderson 107.56	6
(Australia) James Bailey 87.42	2
(Australia) Kyle Anderson 86.42	5
(Australia) Damon Heta 83.45	6

Quarter-finals (best of 19 legs); 11 August
1	(Netherlands) Michael van Gerwen 100.20	10
(Australia) Simon Whitlock 93.96	8
4	(Scotland) Peter Wright 101.91	10
(Netherlands) Raymond van Barneveld 97.16	4
2	(England) Rob Cross 96.57	9
(England) Michael Smith 100.33	10
3	(Scotland) Gary Anderson 95.58	10
(Australia) Damon Heta 90.91	7

Semi-finals (best of 21 legs); 12 August
1	(Netherlands) Michael van Gerwen 103.47	7
4	(Scotland) Peter Wright 104.28	11
(England) Michael Smith 100.40	11
3	(Scotland) Gary Anderson 95.75	5

Final (best of 21 legs); 12 August
4	(Scotland) Peter Wright 97.70	11
(England) Michael Smith 99.17	8
