= Royden Lam =

Hong Kong darts player

Personal information
- Full name: Lam Ting Chi Royden 林鼎智
- Nickname: "The Wolf"
- Born: 8 September 1975 (age 51) Hong Kong
- Home town: Hong Kong

Sport
- Sport: Darts
- Playing since: 2003
- Darts: 21 g Cosmo Darts
- Laterality: Right-handed
- Walk-on music: "Hungry Like the Wolf" by Duran Duran

Organisation (see split in darts)
- BDO: 2007–2013
- PDC: 2013–

PDC premier events – best performances
- World Championship: Last 64: 2014
- UK Open: Last 128: 2013, 2017
- World Series Finals: Last 24: 2018

Other tournament wins
- Years
Hong Kong Open	2009
Malaysia Open	2016
PDC China Qualifier	2013
PDC Asian Tour	2018 (x2), 2019
Dartslive Hong Kong	2012, 2012
Medal record
Men's Darts
Representing Hong Kong
WDF Asia-Pacific Cup
Silver medal – second place	2010 Tokyo	Men's pairs
Bronze medal – third place	2010 Tokyo	Team event

Lam Ting Chi Royden (Chinese: 林鼎智; born 8 September 1975) is a darts player from Hong Kong.

== Career ==
Royden Lam is best known as a soft tip darts player but also plays steel tip darts. In 2009 he won the Hong Kong Open by beating Liu Cheng from China in the final. In 2010, he lost in the final of the Japan Open to Kyle Anderson and in the quarter-finals of the Asia Pacific Cup to Morihiro Hashimoto. In 2011, he almost managed to qualify for the PDC World Championship, but was defeated by Scott MacKenzie 4–3 in the final of the Chinese qualifier.

In 2013, Lam registered for PDC Qualifying School and earned a Tour Card on the final day. However, he only played in three events during the year which included a 5–3 first round loss against Wayne Jones in the UK Open. Lam qualified for the 2014 World Championship by whitewashing Deng Yin 5–0 in the final of the Chinese qualifier. He beat world number 65 Gino Vos 4–1 in the preliminary round, before losing by three sets to one against Wes Newton in the first round. Lam made his debut in the World Cup of Darts in June as he represented Hong Kong with Scott MacKenzie. They defeated Norway 5–2 in the first round to face Australia in the second round. Lam lost his singles match against Simon Whitlock, before MacKenzie saw off Paul Nicholson to mean a doubles match was required to settle the tie, which Hong Kong were whitewashed in 4–0.

In the 2015 World Cup, Lam and MacKenzie caused a couple of shocks. First they defeated Wales' Mark Webster and Jamie Lewis 5–3. Lam then beat Ireland's William O'Connor 4–1, but MacKenzie lost 4–3 to Connie Finnan meaning a doubles match was needed to settle the tie which Hong Kong won 4–3 to reach the quarter-finals. However, the Scottish number two seeds of Gary Anderson and Peter Wright proved a step too far as they won both their singles matches 4–2 to eliminate Hong Kong.

In the 2016 World Cup, the Hong Kong pair lost to Ireland 5–4 in the first round. Lam won the Malaysian Open by beating Mark Jumin in the final and the same opponent defeated him in the semi-finals of the South Asian Qualifier for the 2017 World Championship. Lam claimed a two-year PDC Tour Card for 2017 and 2018 when he beat José de Sousa 5–2 in the last round on the second day of Q School and said he would continue to play a mix of events in Asia and Britain. Lam and new teammate Kai Fan Leung were eliminated in the first round of the 2017 World Cup 5–3 by Russia.

== World Championship results ==
=== PDC ===
- 2014: First round (lost to Wes Newton 1–3)
- 2019: First round (lost to Danny Noppert 0–3)
- 2022: First round (lost to Keane Barry 2–3)
