= Michael Smith (darts player) =

English darts player (born 1990)

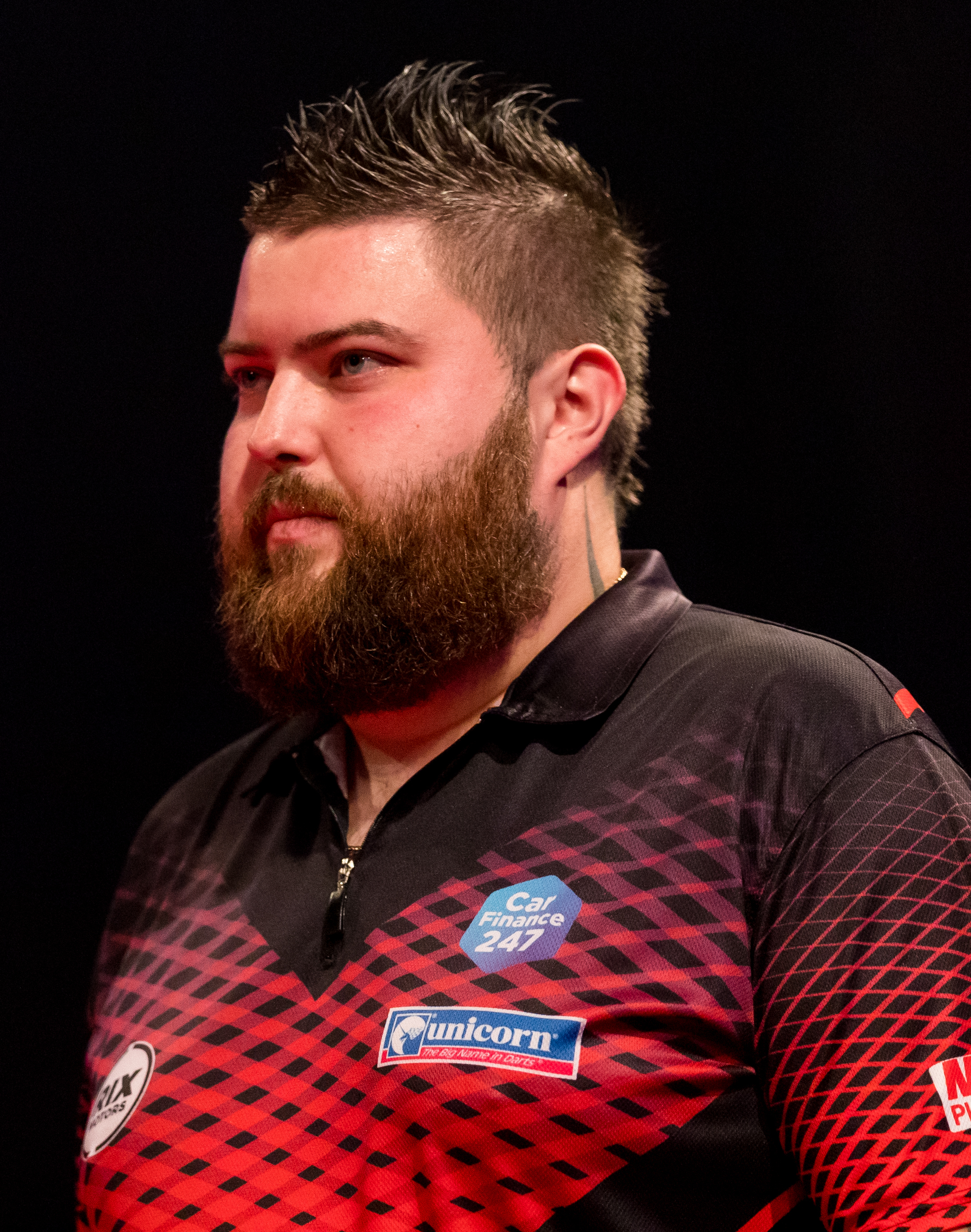
- Smith in 2019

Personal information
- Nickname: Bully Boy
- Born: 18 September 1990 (age 36) St Helens, Merseyside, England

Sport
- Sport: Darts
- Playing since: 2006
- Darts: 24g Shot Signature
- Laterality: Right-handed
- Walk-on music: "Shut Up and Dance" by Walk the Moon

Organisation (see split in darts)
- PDC: 2008–present (Tour Card: 2011–present)
- Current world ranking: (PDC) 37 (5 November 2026)

PDC premier events – best performances
- World Championship: Winner (1): 2023
- World Matchplay: Runner-up: 2019
- World Grand Prix: Semi-final: 2023
- UK Open: Runner-up: 2022
- Grand Slam: Winner (1): 2022
- European Championship: Runner-up: 2022
- Premier League: Runner-up: 2018
- PC Finals: Quarter-final: 2020
- Masters: Runner-up: 2020
- World Series Finals: Runner-up: 2018, 2024

Other tournament wins
- Years
PDC World Cup of Darts (team event)	2024
European Tour Events (×6)
Dutch Darts Championship	2022
European Darts Trophy (×2)	2014, 2015
German Darts Grand Prix	2023
Gibraltar Darts Trophy	2017
International Darts Open	2015
Players Championships (×11)
2012, 2018, 2020 (×2), 2021 (×2), 2022 (×3), 2023, 2024
UK Open Qualifiers (×3)
2011, 2015, 2018
World Series of Darts (×3)
Bahrain Darts Masters	2023
Shanghai Darts Masters	2018
US Darts Masters	2022
Youth Tour
PDC World Youth Championship	2013
PDC Youth Tour	2012 (×5)

Other achievements
- 2014 PDC Young Player of the Year; 2022 PDC Player of the Year

Michael Smith (born 18 September 1990) is an English professional darts player who competes in Professional Darts Corporation (PDC) events. Nicknamed "Bully Boy", he won the 2023 PDC World Darts Championship and was ranked world number one during the 2023 season. He has won a total of 26 PDC titles in his professional career, including the 2022 Grand Slam of Darts, three World Series of Darts titles, and six European Tours.

In his youth career, Smith won the 2013 PDC World Youth Championship and five Youth Tour titles. He won his first PDC major title at the 2022 Grand Slam after previously finishing as the runner-up in eight major singles finals, including the PDC World Championship in 2019 and 2022. At the 2023 World Championship, he hit a nine-dart finish during the second set of the final against Michael van Gerwen, who missed a dart to complete his own nine-darter in the previous visit; this is widely considered the greatest leg in darts history. Smith won the final 7–4 to claim his maiden World Championship title. He also won the 2024 World Cup of Darts for England, partnering Luke Humphries.

== Early life ==
Michael Smith was born on 18 September 1990 to parents Ian and Sandra, who run a pub in St Helens. Smith lived in Cherry Tree Drive, Parr, St Helens throughout his childhood and attended St Cuthbert's High School nearby. He played rugby in his youth but when he was 15, he fell off his bike on the way to school and broke his hip; this required him to use crutches for 16 weeks and ruled him out of playing rugby. Having watched his father play darts, Smith began to play, throwing his first 180 while on crutches. After leaving school, he took a joinery course at college, but he decided to drop out with one exam remaining to play in a darts tournament instead, a decision that he has described as the best of his life. He was a regular winner of local darts events and made his debut in a PDC major at the 2009 UK Open where he lost to Dave Ladley 6–5 in the first round.

== Career ==
Smith reached the last 32 of the 2010 UK Open, knocking out Peter Manley and Matt Clark before losing to Mervyn King. He was one of a number of young players to make a significant impact in the tournament, along with William O'Connor, Arron Monk, and Reece Robinson.

He was the number four seed for the 2011 PDC Under-21 World Championship, where he lost in the quarter-finals to Benito van de Pas.

On 26 February 2011, Smith hit a nine-dart finish in a PDC Youth Tour event in Barnsley, against Michael van Gerwen. He reached the final but lost to Shaun Griffiths. The following day, he won his first PDC Pro Tour event, defeating Dave Chisnall 6–5 in the final of the 2011 UK Open Qualifier 2.

=== 2012 ===
Smith became a full-time professional on the PDC darts circuit and made his debut at the PDC World Championship in 2012, losing to Co Stompé 3–0 in the first round. Smith only hit 3 of his 14 darts at a double during the match. Smith won his second professional tournament in January 2012, at Players Championship Event 2 held in Benidorm. He won seven matches, concluding with a 6–3 victory over Justin Pipe to take the title and the £6,000 prize money. In April, he earned a place in the European Tour Event 1 in Vienna by defeating Les Wallace and Shaun Griffiths in the UK qualifier. He played Jamie Caven in the first round and hit a nine dart finish on his way to a 6–4 win, but then lost 5–6 to Mark Walsh in round two. His results meant he qualified for the World Matchplay for the first time in his career via the ProTour Order of Merit. He faced Raymond van Barneveld in the first round and was beaten 4–10. Smith also played in the World Grand Prix for the first time, losing to Phil Taylor 0–2 in the first round. After all 33 ProTour events of 2012 had been played, Smith was 25th on the Order of Merit, inside the top 32 who qualified for the Players Championship Finals. It was Smith's first appearance in the tournament and he beat Ian White 6–5 in the first round before losing 6–10 to Kim Huybrechts.

=== 2013 ===
Smith's position on the ProTour Order of Merit also saw him qualify for the 2013 World Championship, as he took the second of sixteen places that were awarded to the highest non-qualified players. However, he ran into an in-form Raymond van Barneveld in the first round who averaged 108.31 as Smith could only win one leg during the match in a 0–3 defeat. Smith reached the final of the third UK Open Qualifier in March, but was beaten 2–6 by Michael van Gerwen. Smith won the 2013 PDC World Youth Championship with a 6–1 victory over Ricky Evans, which was broadcast just before the 2013 Premier League Darts Final. Smith led van Barneveld 3–0 in the third round of the UK Open but went on to lose 8–9. In October, he advanced to the semi-finals for the second time in 2013 at the 12th Players Championship but his run was ended with a 6–3 defeat to Kevin Painter. His youth title earned him a place in the Grand Slam of Darts and he produced an impressive display in his first group match against Dave Chisnall as from 3–1 down he hit legs of 11, 12, 14, and 13 darts to win 5–3 with an average of 103.17. However, he then lost 5–2 to Scott Waites and 5–1 to Ted Hankey to finish third in Group H and be eliminated from the tournament.

=== 2014 ===
Smith broke into the world's top 32 on the Order of Merit just before the cut-off for the 2014 World Championship to qualify through the main ranking list for the first time. He beat Morihiro Hashimoto 3–1 in the first round. He then defeated reigning and 16-time world champion Phil Taylor 4–3 in the second round, taking out the bullseye on a 128 finish to win the match. In the next round, Smith hit a 136 finish, with his opponent Peter Wright waiting on 41, to lead 3–2 but only won one more leg after this to lose 4–3. He was named the PDC's Young Player of the Year at the Annual Awards in January. Smith won through to the final of the sixth UK Open Qualifier of the year but averaged just 70.94 as he was whitewashed 6–0 by Michael van Gerwen. A rematch against Wright followed in the third round of the UK Open with Smith throwing for the match in the final leg, but he missed a total of seven darts at doubles to lose 9–8. His second final of 2014 was at the fifth Players Championship, which he reached by beating Raymond van Barneveld 6–3 in the quarter-finals and Gary Anderson 6–4 in the semis, but he was again whitewashed in the decider, this time by Brendan Dolan.

At the World Matchplay, he recorded a 10–8 victory over Justin Pipe before losing 13–6 to Taylor in the second round. At the European Darts Grand Prix, Smith eliminated Gary Anderson, Adrian Lewis, and Stephen Bunting en route to facing Mervyn King in the final. Smith missed too many doubles throughout the match, including one to claim the title, as he lost his third ranking final of the year 6–5. Another final followed a week later at the 14th Players Championship where he lost 6–4 to Van Gerwen. Smith's rich vein of form continued into the European Darts Trophy as he reached the final and came back from 3–0 against Van Gerwen to win the title 6–5, which included a 158 finish to break throw in the ninth leg. He suffered first round exits at the World Grand Prix and European Championship, but topped Group F at the Grand Slam by winning all three of his games. Smith knocked out Christian Kist 10–5 but was then beaten 16–3 by Taylor in the quarter-finals, losing 13 consecutive legs from 3–3. His year in the major events concluded with a 6–4 defeat to Andy Smith in the opening round of the Players Championship Finals.

=== 2015 ===
After seeing off Mensur Suljović 3–1 in the first round of the 2015 World Championship, Smith beat Brendan Dolan 4–2 after having been 2–0 down, to set up a third round tie with fellow St. Helens player Stephen Bunting. Despite taking out checkouts of 170 and 132, Smith was 3–0 down, before finding his scoring game to restrict Bunting to one leg as he closed the gap to 3–2. Ultimately his slow start to the match proved costly as he lost the next set to be knocked out 4–2 in a game that saw each player average 102 and hit eight 180s apiece. Smith won the fifth UK Open Qualifier by beating Adrian Lewis 6–5. A rematch with Bunting followed in the third round of the UK Open, with Smith missing two match darts in the deciding leg to be beaten 9–8. He claimed the second European Tour title of his career by winning the International Darts Open with a 6–3 victory over Benito van de Pas in the final. Smith suffered a 10–4 defeat to Gerwyn Price in the first round of the World Matchplay, but retained his European Darts Trophy title by seeing off Michael van Gerwen in the final for the second year in a row. At the World Grand Prix, he punished two missed match darts from Price to beat him 2–1, but Smith then lost from 2–0 up in sets against Jamie Lewis in the second round. Wins over Wayne Jones, Lewis and Andy Fordham saw Smith top his group at the Grand Slam and he then averaged 104.59 to beat Dave Chisnall 10–7 and reach the quarter-finals. Smith's first major event semi-final soon followed as he defeated Lewis 16–11, but he was heavily beaten 16–6 by Van Gerwen.

=== 2016 ===
At the 2016 World Championship wins over Jeffrey de Zwaan, Steve Beaton, and Benito van de Pas saw Smith reach the quarter-finals for the first time, where he was 3–0 ahead of Raymond van Barneveld. He could only win two legs as Van Barneveld moved 4–3 up, but he took the next to take the match to a ninth and final set. Smith finished 130 on double five to move within a leg of the match and missed one dart to win it, before Van Barneveld won four legs in a row to end Smith's event. Smith made his debut in the Premier League after receiving a wildcard from the PDC. On the opening night, he played twice due to Gary Anderson being ill. Smith lost his first matches 7–2 to Peter Wright and 7–1 to Adrian Lewis. His first point came in week three courtesy of a 6–6 draw with Dave Chisnall. Michael van Gerwen scored a world record three-dart average of 123.40 against Smith in a 7–1 win, but the following week, Smith got his first Premier League victory by beating Van Barneveld 7–5. However, Smith lost his last two matches to finish bottom of the table and be eliminated from the event.

Smith played in the final of the 2016 Austrian Darts Open and lost 6–4 to Phil Taylor. He saw off Simon Whitlock 10–6 at the World Matchplay before losing 11–7 to Steve Beaton in the second round and was knocked out 2–1 in sets by Alan Norris in the first round of the World Grand Prix. Smith was also eliminated in the first round of the European Championship and Players Championship Finals.

=== 2017 ===
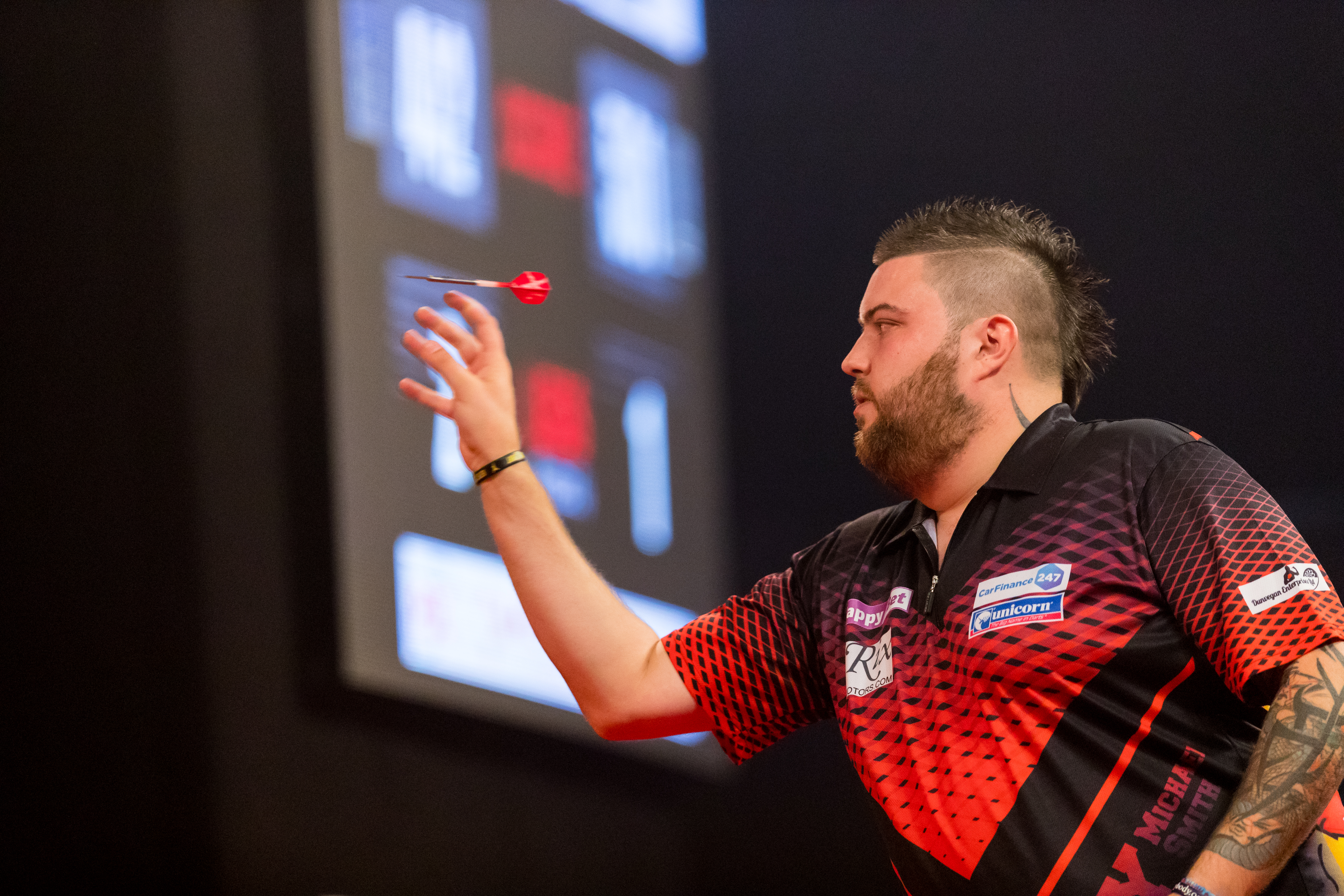
Smith during the 2017 German Darts Grand Prix

Smith entered the 2017 World Championship without a match win since September 2016 having lost 10 in a row. He took the deciding set of his first round match with Ricky Evans without dropping a leg and said he had been "fighting his demons" recently. In the next round, he missed five darts to eliminate Mervyn King 4–1, but kept his composure to eventually see him off 4–3. Smith went 3–1 up on James Wade in the third round, but after Wade took the next set, Smith lost six legs in a row to be eliminated 4–3. He missed two darts to win the third UK Open Qualifier as Peter Wright beat him 6–5. Four 6–5 wins saw him reach the final of the Gibraltar Darts Trophy and at 4–4 he took out a 132 finish with Mensur Suljović waiting on 56 to break throw and took home his first title in nearly two years with a 6–4 victory. Smith qualified for the 2017 European Championship as third seed, losing in the quarter-final to Rob Cross.

=== 2018 ===
Smith was thirteenth seeded at the 2018 World Championship, losing in the second round to eventual champion Rob Cross, having missed two match darts. Following the championship, Smith was invited into the 2018 Premier League, the second invitation to the Premier League he had received. Smith finished the league phase in second place, qualifying for the play-offs. He beat Gary Anderson in the semi-final before losing in the final 4–11 to Michael van Gerwen.

2018 also saw Smith win his first event on the World Series of Darts, taking the 2018 Shanghai Darts Masters with an 8–2 win over Rob Cross in the final. Smith reached the final of the 2018 World Series of Darts Finals, missing five darts to take the title in a 10–11 defeat to James Wade.

=== 2019: World Championship and World Matchplay finals ===
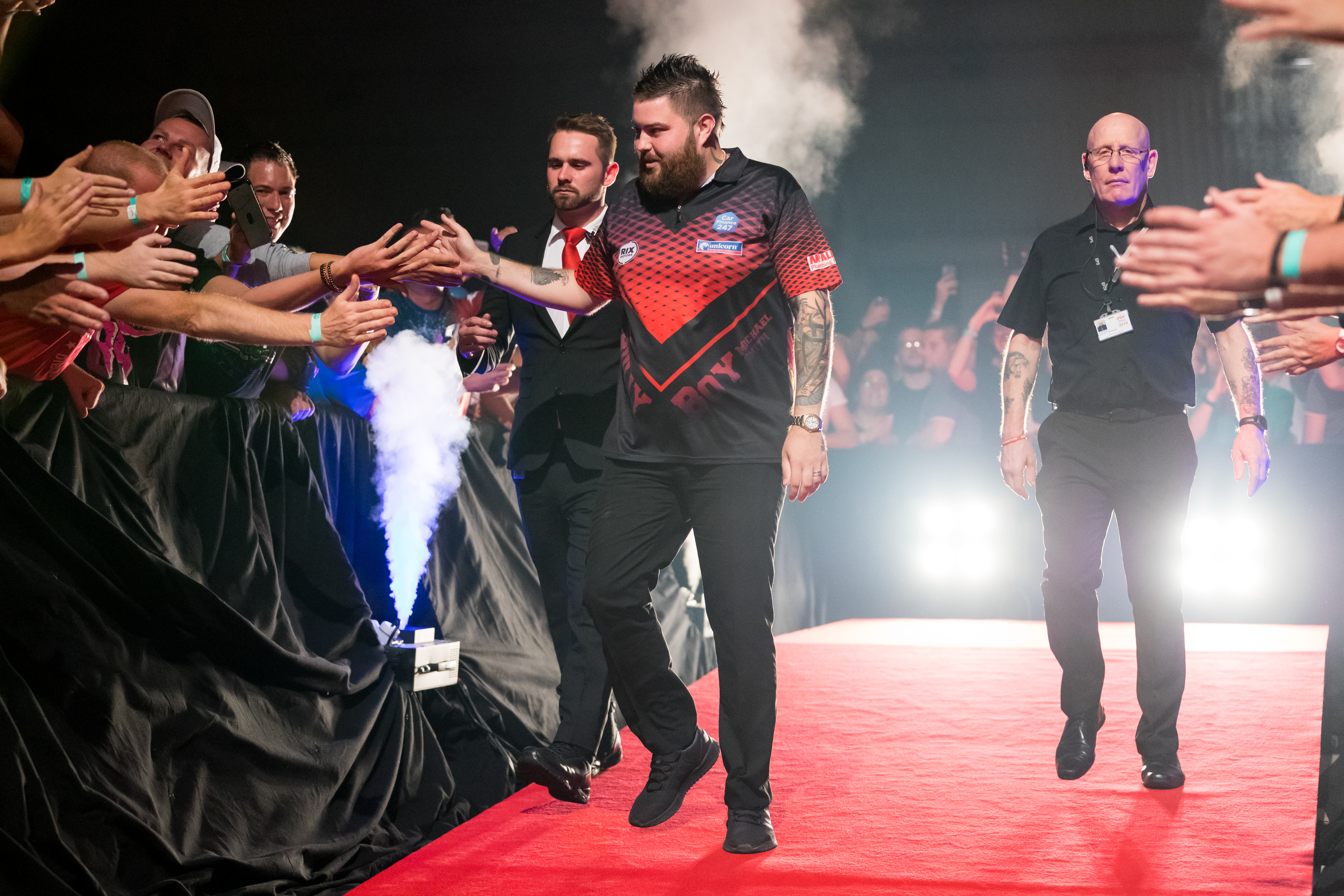
Smith at the 2019 European Darts Matchplay

Smith was tenth seed at the 2019 World Championship. In the second round, he eliminated Ron Meulenkamp before beating John Henderson and Ryan Searle to reach the quarter-final. He reached his first World Championship semi-final with a 5–1 victory over Luke Humphries, then beat Nathan Aspinall in the semi-final to set up a final against Michael van Gerwen. Smith was defeated in the final, 7–3.

He reached the final of the 2019 World Matchplay, where he faced Rob Cross. Smith lost the first 9 legs of the match and eventually succumbed 18–13.

=== 2020 ===
Smith suffered an early exit at the 2020 World Championship, losing to Luke Woodhouse in the second round. Smith missed three match darts to beat Peter Wright in the final of the 2020 Masters, losing 11–10 in a last leg decider. He had previously defeated Mensur Suljović, Adrian Lewis, and Nathan Aspinall to reach the final.

On 27 February 2020, in week 4 of the 2020 Premier League, Smith hit his first televised nine-dart leg in a 7–5 victory over Daryl Gurney.

=== 2021 ===
Smith had another early exit at the 2021 World Championship, losing again in the second round, this time to Jason Lowe.

At the 2021 Grand Slam of Darts, he beat Michael van Gerwen 16–13 to reach the semi-finals, where he eventually lost 16–12 to Peter Wright. Smith led 12–8, but Wright won eight consecutive legs to clinch a place in the final against Gerwyn Price.

=== 2022: First major title ===
Smith began his 2022 World Championship campaign with a comfortable 3–0 win over Ron Meulenkamp, before defeating William O'Connor 4–2. The next two games saw him take on two of the most in-form players from the 2021 season; first defeating Jonny Clayton in a last-set shootout that went to extra legs; and then triumphing over defending champion Gerwyn Price, surviving two match darts and a 9 darter before winning the final set. In the semi-final Smith took an early lead over James Wade and eventually triumphed 6–3, reaching the final for the second time in his career. Smith lost the final 7–5 to Peter Wright and claimed £200,000 as runner-up.

Smith reached the final of the UK Open in March, but lost 11–10 to Danny Noppert despite Noppert only averaging 84.82 to see his 7th final defeat. He recovered well to win a night event on the final standard night of the 2022 Premier League, but came 7th in the table and did not qualify for the playoff places. His good form after the UK Open continued, winning 3 Pro Tour titles in a short period and performing well in the European Tour and was victorious at the US Darts Masters at Maddison Square Gardens beating Michael Van Gerwen in the final 8-4 .

In July, Smith reached the last 16 of the 2022 World Matchplay, where he was beaten 11–7 by Dirk van Duijvenbode. In October, Smith reached an eighth major televised final, losing 11–8 to namesake Ross in the European Championship final. The following month, Smith finally won his first major title at his ninth attempt in the 2022 Grand Slam of Darts. He consecutively defeated Lisa Ashton, Joe Cullen, Ritchie Edhouse, Rob Cross, Joe Cullen (second time in the tournament), and Raymond van Barneveld before defeating Nathan Aspinall 16–5 in the final.

=== 2023: World Championship win ===
Smith opened his 2023 World Championship campaign with a 3–0 win over Nathan Rafferty. In the third round, Smith came from 3–1 down to beat Martin Schindler 4–3, before beating Joe Cullen and Stephen Bunting to reach the semi-finals. In his semi-final match, Smith beat Gabriel Clemens 6–2 to reach his third World Championship final. In the final, Smith hit a nine dart finish only seconds after Michael van Gerwen missed Double 12 for his own nine-darter. It is widely considered the best leg in darts history. After a back and forth match, Smith broke van Gerwen's throw and held his own throw to lead 6–3. After losing the tenth set and going two down in the eleventh set, Smith won two legs in a row to throw for the match. Smith finished in eleven darts to win 7–4 and become world champion for the first time and move up to world number one in the PDC Order of Merit for the first time.

Smith followed his world championship victory by winning the inaugural edition of the Bahrain Darts Masters, defeating Gerwyn Price 8–6 in the final to claim his third World Series title. He won his sixth European Tour title at the German Darts Grand Prix by beating Nathan Aspinall 8–5 in the final.

Smith qualified for the Premier League playoffs following a run of three consecutive nightly wins near the end of the league stage. He lost 10–8 in the semi-finals to eventual champion Michael van Gerwen.

=== 2024: World Cup win ===
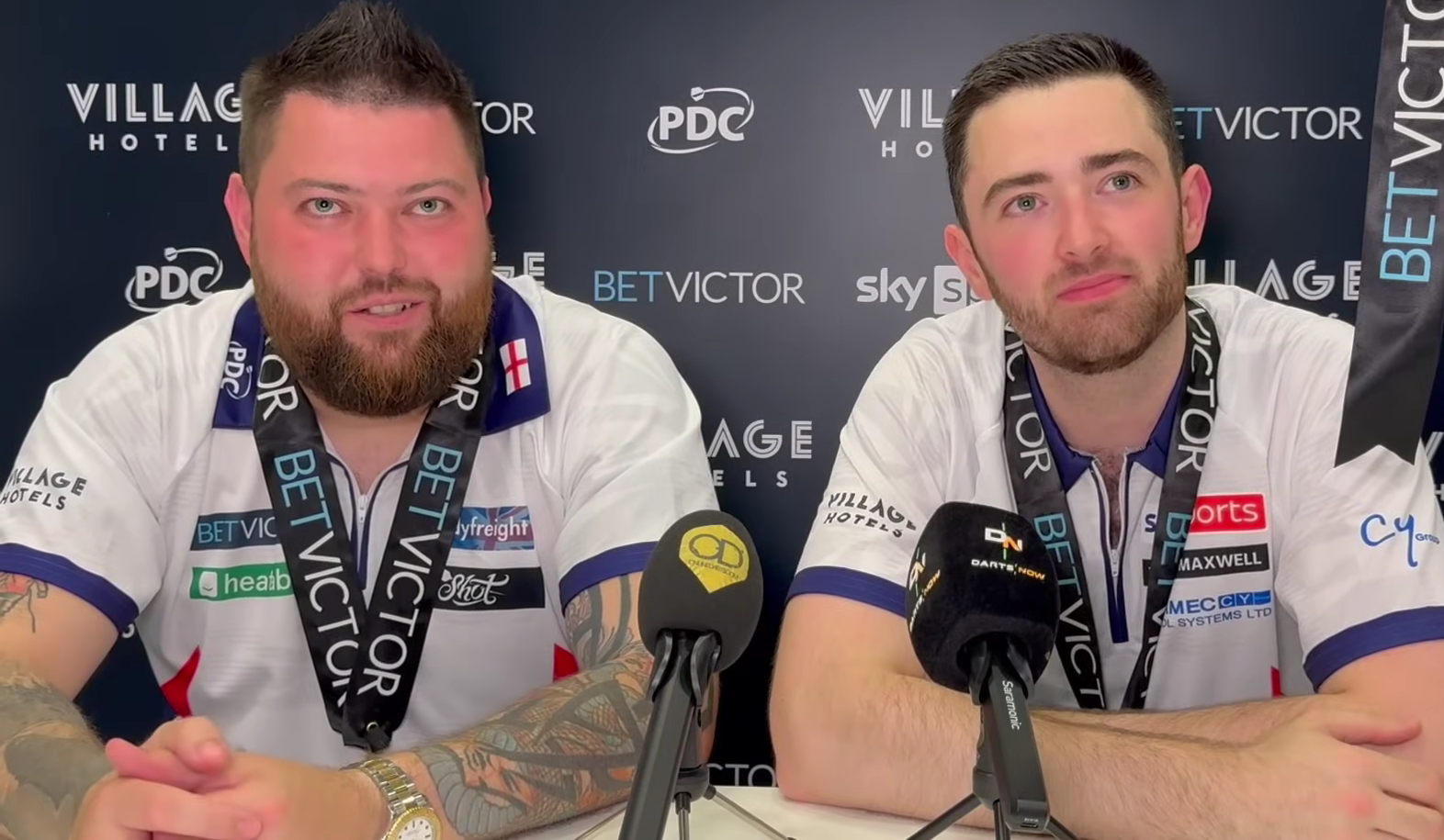
Smith and Luke Humphries after their win in the 2024 PDC World Cup of Darts

At the 2024 World Championship, Smith opened the defence of his world crown with a 3–2 second round victory over Kevin Doets. In the third round, Smith defeated Madars Razma 4–1 and criticised his gamesmanship in an interview after the game, claiming, "He just tried to think about putting me off, I guess, but lessons learned. I learned my lesson, and he's learned his as well." In the fourth round, Smith was whitewashed 4–0 by Chris Dobey, ending the defence of his world title.

In May 2024, Smith won a first PDC ranking title for eleven months at PC9.

Smith partnered with Luke Humphries to win the 2024 PDC World Cup of Darts for England, defeating Austria 10–6 in the final on 30 June.

Smith was runner–up at the 2024 World Series of Darts Finals, losing to Luke Littler 11–4 in the final.

=== 2025 ===
At the 2025 World Championship, Smith suffered an early exit, losing 3–2 to Kevin Doets in a rematch of their 2024 World Championship meeting. This loss resulted in Smith exiting the top ten of the PDC World Rankings. He reached the quarter-finals of the UK Open, where he lost 10–8 to Jonny Clayton.

Smith failed to qualify for the World Matchplay for the first time since 2013, falling to world number 21 by the time of the cut-off date for qualification. After a series of issues relating to arthritis and other injuries, he earned his way into the Grand Slam of Darts in November as a Tour Card holder qualifier, marking his first televised appearance since the UK Open in March. He reached the quarter-finals of the tournament following a 10–9 win over Chris Dobey in the second round. He was eliminated in a 16–8 defeat to Luke Humphries.

=== 2026 ===
Following a 3–0 first-round win over Lisa Ashton, Smith was beaten 3–1 by Niels Zonneveld in the second round of the 2026 World Championship. He reached the final of Players Championship 11 in April, where he lost in a deciding leg to Beau Greaves.

== Personal life ==
Smith's nickname, Bully Boy, does not come from "bullseye", instead stemming from an incident from Smith's childhood when he was working on a farm. He is a supporter of St Helens R.F.C. and regularly attends their matches.

He married his wife Dagmara in January 2019, they have two sons.

On 4 March 2023, Smith was nominated for Freedom of the Borough status by St Helens Borough Council for sporting services to his hometown city, the highest honour a council can award.

Following a first-round defeat at the 2025 World Masters, Smith revealed in a statement on his social media accounts that he was suffering from arthritis in his throwing (right) hand, as well as a grade two acromioclavicular joint injury.

== World Championship results ==
=== PDC ===
- 2012: First round (lost to Co Stompé 0–3)
- 2013: First round (lost to Raymond van Barneveld 0–3)
- 2014: Third round (lost to Peter Wright 3–4)
- 2015: Third round (lost to Stephen Bunting 2–4)
- 2016: Quarter-finals (lost to Raymond van Barneveld 4–5)
- 2017: Third round (lost to James Wade 3–4)
- 2018: Second round (lost to Rob Cross 3–4)
- 2019: Runner-up (lost to Michael van Gerwen 3–7)
- 2020: Second round (lost to Luke Woodhouse 1–3)
- 2021: Second round (lost to Jason Lowe 1–3)
- 2022: Runner-up (lost to Peter Wright 5–7)
- 2023: Winner (beat Michael van Gerwen 7–4)
- 2024: Fourth round (lost to Chris Dobey 0–4)
- 2025: Second round (lost to Kevin Doets 2–3)
- 2026: Second round (lost to Niels Zonneveld 1–3)

== Career finals ==
=== PDC major finals: 11 (2 titles) ===
Legend
World Championship (1–2)
World Matchplay (0–1)
Premier League (0–1)
European Championship (0–1)
UK Open (0–1)
The Masters (0–1)
Grand Slam (1–0)
World Series of Darts Finals (0–2)

Outcome	No.	Year	Championship	Opponent in the final	Score (Note: (l) = score in legs, (s) = score in sets, (m) = matches won.)
Runner-up	1.	2018	Premier League	Michael van Gerwen	4–11 (l)
Runner-up	2.	2018	World Series of Darts Finals	James Wade	10–11 (l)
Runner-up	3.	2019	World Championship	Michael van Gerwen	3–7 (s)
Runner-up	4.	2019	World Matchplay	Rob Cross	13–18 (l)
Runner-up	5.	2020	Masters	Peter Wright	10–11 (l)
Runner-up	6.	2022	World Championship (2)	Peter Wright	5–7 (s)
Runner-up	7.	2022	UK Open	Danny Noppert	10–11 (l)
Runner-up	8.	2022	European Championship	Ross Smith	8–11 (l)
Winner	1.	2022	Grand Slam	Nathan Aspinall	16–5 (l)
Winner	2.	2023	World Championship	Michael van Gerwen	7–4 (s)
Runner-up	9.	2024	World Series of Darts Finals (2)	Luke Littler	4–11 (l)

=== PDC World Series finals: 5 (3 titles) ===
Legend
World Series of Darts (3–2)

Outcome	No.	Year	Championship	Opponent in the final	Score
Winner	1.	2018	Shanghai Darts Masters	Rob Cross	8–2 (l)
Runner-up	1.	2018	Melbourne Darts Masters	Peter Wright	8–11 (l)
Runner-up	2.	2019	US Darts Masters	Nathan Aspinall	4–8 (l)
Winner	2.	2022	US Darts Masters	Michael van Gerwen	8–4 (l)
Winner	3.	2023	Bahrain Darts Masters	Gerwyn Price	8–6 (l)

=== PDC team finals: 2 (1 title) ===
Outcome	No.	Year	Championship	Team	Teammate	Opponents in the final	Score
Runner-up	1.	2020	World Cup of Darts	England	Rob Cross	Wales – Gerwyn Price and Jonny Clayton	0–3 (m)
Winner	1.	2024	World Cup of Darts	England	Luke Humphries	Austria – Mensur Suljović and Rowby-John Rodriguez	10–6 (l)

== Performance timeline ==
Tournament	2009	2010	2011	2012	2013	2014	2015	2016	2017	2018	2019	2020	2021	2022	2023	2024	2025	2026
PDC Ranked televised events
World Championship	Did not qualify			1R	1R	3R	3R	QF	3R	2R	F	2R	2R	F	W	4R	2R	2R
World Masters (Note: A non-ranked event until 2025)	Not held				Did not qualify			QF	1R	1R	QF	F	1R	QF	SF	2R	1R	Prel.
UK Open	1R	4R	4R	3R	3R	3R	3R	4R	5R	5R	SF	5R	5R	F	5R	5R	QF	5R
World Matchplay	Did not qualify			1R	DNQ	2R	1R	2R	1R	2R	F	SF	QF	2R	2R	SF	DNQ	
World Grand Prix	Did not qualify			1R	DNQ	1R	2R	1R	1R	1R	2R	1R	1R	1R	SF	1R	DNQ	
European Championship	Did not qualify					1R	2R	1R	QF	2R	SF	2R	1R	F	2R	2R	DNQ	
Grand Slam (Note: A non-ranked event until 2015)	Did not qualify				RR	QF	SF	DNQ	2R	2R	QF	QF	SF	W	RR	RR	QF	DNQ
Players Championship Finals	Did not qualify			2R	1R	1R	2R	1R	1R	2R	3R	QF	2R	1R	1R	2R	1R	
PDC Non-ranked televised events
Premier League	Did not participate							10th	DNP	F	7th	7th	DNP	6th	SF	SF	DNP	
Champions League	Not held							RR	DNQ		SF	Not held						
World Cup	NH	DNQ	NH	Did not qualify							2R	F	DNQ	SF	QF	W	DNQ	
World Series Finals	Not held						1R	1R	1R	F	1R	QF	1R	QF	2R	F	DNQ	
World Youth Championship	Not held		QF	1R	W	Did not participate												
Career statistics
Year-end ranking	NR	NR	62	38	32	22	8	11	13	10	4	7	5	1	3	2	32	

=== PDC European Tour ===
Season	1	2	3	4	5	6	7	8	9	10	11	12	13	14	15
2012	ADO; 2R	GDC; DNQ	EDO; DNQ	GDM; DNQ	DDM; 1R										
2013	UKM; 1R	EDT; 2R	EDO; DNQ	ADO; DNQ	GDT; DNQ	GDC; 1R	GDM; 2R	DDM; DNQ							
2014	GDC; 2R	DDM; DNQ	GDM; QF	ADO; 2R	GDT; SF	EDO; 2R	EDG; F	EDT; W							
2015	GDC; 3R	GDT; 2R	GDM; 2R	DDM; 3R	IDO; W	EDO; 3R	EDT; W	EDM; 2R	EDG; QF						
2016	DDM; 3R	GDM; SF	GDT; 3R	EDM; 3R	ADO; F	EDO; 3R	IDO; 2R	EDT; QF	EDG; 3R	GDC; 2R					
2017	GDC; 2R	GDM; QF	GDO; 2R	EDG; 2R	GDT; W	EDM; SF	ADO; F	EDO; SF	DDM; SF	GDG; QF	IDO; 2R	EDT; QF			
2018	EDO; 3R	GDG; 3R	GDO; F	ADO; QF	EDG; SF	DDM; 2R	GDT; 2R	DDO; 2R	EDM; 2R	GDC; 3R	DDC; DNP	IDO; DNP	EDT; SF		
2019	EDO; 2R	GDC; WD	GDG; 2R	GDO; DNP	ADO; 2R	EDG; 3R	DDM; 2R	DDO; 2R	CDO; 2R	ADC; 2R	EDM; 2R	IDO; DNP	GDT; 3R		
2020	BDC; F	GDC; 2R	EDG; 3R	IDO; SF											
2021	HDT; F	GDT; 2R													
2022	IDO; QF	GDC; QF	GDG; 3R	ADO; DNP	EDO; DNP	CDO; 2R	EDG; 2R	DDC; W	EDM; WD	HDT; 3R	GDO; WD	BDO; WD	GDT; 2R		
2023	BSD; 3R	EDO; 3R	IDO; 2R	GDG; W	ADO; 3R	DDC; 3R	BDO; QF	CDO; WD	EDG; DNP	EDM; QF	GDO; DNP	HDT; 3R	GDC; 3R		
2024	BDO; 2R	GDG; 3R	IDO; 2R	EDG; 3R	ADO; DNP	BSD; DNP	DDC; WD	EDO; SF	GDC; WD	FDT; DNP	HDT; 1R	SDT; 2R	CDO; 3R		
2025	BDO; 2R	EDT; 3R	IDO; 1R	GDG; 2R	ADO; DNP	EDG; QF	DDC; 3R	EDO; 2R	BSD; WD	FDT; 1R	CDO; DNP	HDT; DNP	SDT; DNQ	GDC; DNQ	
2026	PDO; QF	EDT; DNQ	BDO; 1R	GDG; QF	EDG; DNQ	ADO; 1R	IDO; WD	Did not qualify						SDT; 3R	DDC; 2R

=== PDC Players Championships ===
Season	1	2	3	4	5	6	7	8	9	10	11	12	13	14	15	16	17	18	19	20	21	22	23	24	25	26	27	28	29	30	31	32	33	34	35	36	37
2010 (Note: Tour card system non-existent)	DNP			DER; 1R	GLA; DNP		WIG; 1R	CRA; DNP	BAR; DNP	DER; 2R	WIG; 1R	WIG; 1R	SAL; DNP		BAR; 2R	BAR; 2R	DNP								CRA; 1R	CRA; 2R	DNP							BAR; 1R	BAR; 1R	DER; 4R	DER; 3R
2011	HAL; 1R	HAL; 1R	DER; DNP		CRA; 2R	CRA; 1R	VIE; 2R	VIE; 3R	CRA; 2R	CRA; 2R	BAR; 1R	BAR; 1R	NUL; 3R	NUL; 2R	ONT; DNP		DER; 4R	DER; 2R	NUL; 2R	NUL; QF	DUB; 3R	DUB; 1R	KIL; 3R	GLA; 4R	GLA; 3R	ALI; 1R	ALI; 2R	CRA; 1R	CRA; 3R	WIG; 3R	WIG; 2R						
2012	ALI; 3R	ALI; W	REA; 3R	REA; 3R	CRA; 1R	CRA; 2R	BIR; 4R	BIR; 3R	CRA; 1R	CRA; 1R	BAR; 1R	BAR; 1R	DUB; 3R	DUB; 2R	KIL; 2R	KIL; 2R	CRA; 2R	CRA; 3R	BAR; 3R	BAR; 3R																	
2013	WIG; 3R	WIG; 1R	WIG; 4R	WIG; 2R	CRA; 1R	CRA; 1R	BAR; 3R	BAR; 2R	DUB; 1R	DUB; 1R	KIL; 4R	KIL; SF	WIG; 3R	WIG; 4R	BAR; QF	BAR; 3R																					
2014	BAR; 4R	BAR; QF	CRA; 3R	CRA; QF	WIG; F	WIG; 4R	WIG; 4R	WIG; 2R	CRA; 3R	CRA; 1R	COV; 1R	COV; 4R	CRA; 2R	CRA; F	DUB; 3R	DUB; 2R	CRA; 3R	CRA; 4R	COV; 4R	COV; 2R																	
2015	BAR; 1R	BAR; SF	BAR; QF	BAR; 2R	BAR; DNP	COV; 2R	COV; 4R	COV; 1R	CRA; 2R	CRA; 2R	BAR; 2R	BAR; SF	WIG; 2R	WIG; SF	BAR; 2R	BAR; 4R	DUB; 3R	DUB; 4R	COV; 1R	COV; 2R																	
2016	BAR; 3R	BAR; 3R	BAR; QF	BAR; 1R	BAR; 2R	BAR; 3R	BAR; 1R	COV; 3R	COV; 1R	BAR; 3R	BAR; 2R	BAR; DNP		BAR; 2R	BAR; 3R	BAR; 4R	DUB; 2R	DUB; 1R	BAR; 1R	BAR; 1R																	
2017	BAR; QF	BAR; QF	BAR; QF	BAR; 2R	MIL; 1R	MIL; 1R	BAR; 4R	BAR; 1R	WIG; 2R	WIG; SF	MIL; 4R	MIL; 3R	WIG; 4R	WIG; 2R	BAR; 3R	BAR; 1R	BAR; SF	BAR; 2R	DUB; 3R	DUB; 3R	BAR; QF	BAR; 4R															
2018	BAR; 4R	BAR; 1R	BAR; 2R	BAR; 3R	MIL; DNP	MIL; 1R	BAR; W	BAR; 2R	WIG; 2R	WIG; 2R	MIL; QF	MIL; QF	WIG; 1R	WIG; SF	BAR; QF	BAR; 3R	BAR; QF	BAR; 3R	DUB; 1R	DUB; 3R	BAR; 4R	BAR; QF															
2019	WIG; QF	WIG; 1R	WIG; 2R	WIG; 4R	BAR; 2R	BAR; 1R	WIG; 1R	WIG; 2R	BAR; F	BAR; 2R	BAR; F	BAR; SF	BAR; 3R	BAR; 3R	BAR; QF	BAR; 4R	WIG; 3R	WIG; 4R	BAR; 1R	BAR; 1R	HIL; QF	HIL; 4R	BAR; 2R	BAR; 1R	BAR; SF	BAR; 1R	DUB; 4R	DUB; 3R	BAR; 4R	BAR; 4R							
2020	BAR; 3R	BAR; 4R	WIG; 4R	WIG; 1R	WIG; 1R	WIG; 1R	BAR; 3R	BAR; QF	MIL; 3R	MIL; 1R	MIL; 3R	MIL; QF	MIL; 3R	NIE; 1R	NIE; 3R	NIE; 2R	NIE; 1R	NIE; 1R	COV; W	COV; W	COV; 3R	COV; 4R	COV; 3R														
2021	BOL; QF	BOL; 2R	BOL; 1R	BOL; QF	MIL; F	MIL; QF	MIL; 4R	MIL; 1R	NIE; 3R	NIE; W	NIE; 4R	NIE; QF	MIL; 1R	MIL; 4R	MIL; 2R	MIL; 4R	COV; 1R	COV; 3R	COV; QF	COV; QF	BAR; 4R	BAR; 2R	BAR; 2R	BAR; 3R	BAR; 3R	BAR; QF	BAR; W	BAR; 2R	BAR; 4R	BAR; 3R							
2022	BAR; 3R	BAR; 1R	WIG; 1R	WIG; 2R	BAR; 1R	BAR; QF	NIE; DNP		BAR; 1R	BAR; 1R	BAR; 3R	BAR; SF	BAR; 3R	WIG; W	WIG; W	NIE; W	NIE; 3R	BAR; 1R	BAR; 2R	BAR; 4R	BAR; 4R	BAR; QF	BAR; QF	BAR; DNP	BAR; 4R	BAR; QF	BAR; 1R	BAR; 3R	BAR; 1R	BAR; DNP							
2023	BAR; 4R	BAR; QF	BAR; DNP		BAR; 1R	BAR; 3R	DNP						HIL; W	HIL; 2R	DNP				BAR; 2R	BAR; QF	BAR; 3R	BAR; SF	BAR; 2R	BAR; DNP	BAR; 2R	BAR; 1R	BAR; 2R	BAR; DNP	BAR; 2R	BAR; QF							
2024	WIG; 2R	WIG; 1R	LEI; 4R	LEI; 3R	HIL; 4R	HIL; 3R	LEI; 2R	LEI; 2R	HIL; W	HIL; 4R	HIL; 2R	HIL; 2R	MIL; 3R	MIL; 3R	MIL; 2R	MIL; 2R	MIL; 1R	MIL; DNP		WIG; 3R	WIG; 3R	LEI; 3R	LEI; 3R	WIG; 1R	WIG; 3R	WIG; 3R	WIG; 3R	WIG; QF	LEI; QF	LEI; 2R							
2025	WIG; 1R	WIG; 1R	ROS; 1R	ROS; 1R	LEI; 2R	LEI; 1R	HIL; 2R	HIL; 1R	LEI; 3R	LEI; SF	LEI; 1R	LEI; 3R	ROS; 3R	ROS; SF	HIL; 3R	HIL; 1R	LEI; QF	LEI; 2R	LEI; 3R	LEI; 1R	LEI; 1R	HIL; DNP		MIL; 4R	MIL; 1R	HIL; 1R	HIL; 2R	LEI; 1R	LEI; 1R	LEI; 2R	WIG; 3R	WIG; 1R	WIG; 1R	WIG; 1R			
2026	HIL; 2R	HIL; 1R	WIG; 2R	WIG; 1R	LEI; 3R	LEI; 1R	LEI; 2R	LEI; 2R	WIG; 3R	WIG; 1R	MIL; F	MIL; DNP	HIL; 1R	HIL; 2R	LEI; 1R	LEI; 2R	LEI; 1R	LEI; 1R	MIL; DNP		WIG; 3R	WIG; 2R	LEI; 1R	LEI; 1R	HIL; 2R	HIL; 3R	LEI; 1R	LEI; 2R	ROS; 1R	ROS; 2R	ROS; 2R	ROS; QF	LEI; 2R	LEI; 1R			

Key

Performance Table Legend
W	Won the tournament	F	Finalist	SF	Semifinalist	QF	Quarterfinalist	#R; RR; Prel.	Lost in # round Round-robin; Preliminary round	DQ	Disqualified
DNQ	Did not qualify	DNP	Did not participate	WD	Withdrew	NH	Tournament not held	#R; RR; Prel.	Lost in # round Round-robin; Preliminary round	NYF	Not yet founded

== Nine-dart finishes ==
Michael Smith televised nine-dart finishes
Date	Opponent	Tournament	Method
27 February 2020	(Northern Ireland) Daryl Gurney	Premier League	3 x T20; 3 x T20; T20, T19, D12
5 March 2022	(Austria) Mensur Suljović	UK Open	3 x T20; 3 x T20; T20, T19, D12
3 January 2023	(Netherlands) Michael van Gerwen	World Championship	3 x T20; 3 x T20; T20, T19, D12

Sporting positions
Preceded by Gerwyn Price	PDC World Number One; 3 January 2023 – 3 January 2024	Succeeded by Luke Humphries
Awards
Preceded by Gerwyn Price	PDC Player of the Year; 2022	Succeeded by Luke Humphries
