= 2019 PDC Calendar =

This is a list of the 2019 Professional Darts Corporation calendar of events with player progression documented from the quarterfinals stage where applicable.

The list includes European tour events, Players Championships events, World Series of Darts events and PDC majors. This list includes some regional tours, such as the ones in Nordic, Baltic and Oceanic regions, but does not include British Darts Organisation (BDO) events.

== January ==
Date	Tournament	Champions	Runners-up	Semi-finalists	Quarter-finalists
3–6 January	2019 European Q-School; Hildesheim, Germany	Does not apply.			
17–20 January	2019 UK Q-School; Wigan, England	Does not apply.			
19 January	2019 European Tour 1 – Eastern Europe Qualifier; Bubeneč, Czech Republic	Does not apply.			
19 January	2019 European Tour 2 – Eastern Europe Qualifier; Bubeneč, Czech Republic	Does not apply.			
20 January	2019 European Tour 3 – Eastern Europe Qualifier; Bubeneč, Czech Republic	Does not apply.			
20 January	2019 European Tour 4 – Eastern Europe Qualifier; Bubeneč, Czech Republic	Does not apply.			
26 January	2019 PDC Asian Tour 1 Seoul, South Korea	(Hong Kong) Royden Lam	(Singapore) Paul Lim	(Philippines) Lourence Ilagan (Hong Kong) Ho-Yin Shek	(Thailand) Thanawat Gaweenuntawong (Hong Kong) Kai Fan Leung (Philippines) Christian Perez (Japan) Kazuki Hagane
26 January	2019 PDC Challenge Tour 1 Wigan, England	(England) Shaun Carroll	(England) Patrick Lynskey	(England) Brett Claydon (England) Mick Todd	(Scotland) William Borland (England) Andrew Foster (England) Ricky Williams (England) Ritchie Edhouse
26 January	2019 PDC Challenge Tour 2 Wigan, England	(England) Stephen Burton	(Northern Ireland) Nathan Rafferty	(Brazil) Diogo Portela (England) Jason Wilson	(England) Mick Todd (New Zealand) Darren Herewini (Austria) Michael Rasztovits (England) Andrew Gilding
27 January	2019 PDC Asian Tour 2 Seoul, South Korea	(Singapore) Paul Lim	(Hong Kong) Kai Fan Leung	(Philippines) Lourence Ilagan (Japan) Yuya Higuchi	(Philippines) Michael Viola (Philippines) Christian Perez (Japan) Mikuru Suzuki (South Korea) Jin Ho Song
27 January	2019 PDC Challenge Tour 3 Wigan, England	(England) Ritchie Edhouse	(England) Scott Taylor	(England) Andrew Gilding (Sweden) Dennis Nilsson	(England) Mick Todd (Netherlands) Jeffrey de Graaf (England) Anthony Brown (England) Andy Hamilton
27 January	2019 PDC Challenge Tour 4 Wigan, England	(Russia) Boris Koltsov	(England) Dave Prins	(England) Jason Askew (England) Dave Ladley	(Netherlands) Danny van Trijp (Netherlands) Jerry Hendriks (Wales) Rhys Griffin (England) Darren Johnson

== February ==
Date	Tournament	Champions	Runners-up	Semi-finalists	Quarter-finalists
1–3 February	2019 Masters Milton Keynes, England	(Netherlands) Michael van Gerwen	(England) James Wade	(England) Dave Chisnall (Scotland) Peter Wright	(Austria) Mensur Suljović (England) Stephen Bunting (England) Joe Cullen (England) Michael Smith
1 February	2019 DPA Tour 1 Barrack Heights, Australia	(Australia) James Bailey	(Australia) Damon Heta	(Australia) Shane Tichowitsch (Australia) Rhys Mathewson	(Australia) Raymond Smith (New Zealand) Haupai Puha (Australia) Justin Thompson (Australia) Robbie King
1 February	2019 European Tour 4 – Nordic & Baltic Qualifier; Gothenburg, Sweden	Does not apply.			
1 February	2019 European Tour 5 – Nordic & Baltic Qualifier; Gothenburg, Sweden	Does not apply.			
2 February	2019 DPA Tour 2 Barrack Heights, Australia	(Australia) Steve Fitzpatrick	(Australia) James Bailey	(Australia) Koha Kokiri (Australia) Rhys Mathewson	(Australia) Raymond Smith (Australia) Brendan McCausland (Australia) Justin Thompson (Australia) Gordon Mathers
2 February	2019 DPA Tour 3 Barrack Heights, Australia	(Australia) Damon Heta	(New Zealand) Haupai Puha	(Australia) Raymond Smith (Australia) Rhys Mathewson	(Australia) Rob Modra (Australia) Bill Aitken (Australia) Tim Pusey (Australia) Robbie King
2 February	2019 PDC Nordic & Baltic Tour 1 Gothenburg, Sweden	(Latvia) Madars Razma	(Finland) Ulf Ceder	(Sweden) Johan Engström (Sweden) Oskar Lukasiak	(Lithuania) Darius Labanauskas (Sweden) Edwin Torbjörnsson (Sweden) Daniel Larsson (Finland) Marko Kantele
2 February	2019 European Tour 6 – Nordic & Baltic Qualifier; Gothenburg, Sweden	Does not apply.			
3 February	2019 DPA Tour 4 Barrack Heights, Australia	(Australia) Damon Heta	(Australia) Steve Fitzpatrick	(Australia) Koha Kokiri (Australia) Gordon Mathers	(Australia) Rob Modra (New Zealand) Haupai Puha (Australia) David Platt (Australia) Rhys Mathewson
3 February	2019 PDC Nordic & Baltic Tour 2 Gothenburg, Sweden	(Lithuania) Darius Labanauskas	(Finland) Marko Kantele	(Sweden) Daniel Larsson (Sweden) Andreas Harrysson	(Finland) Kim Viljanen (Sweden) Oskar Lukasiak (Finland) Ulf Ceder (Sweden) Mika Wennersten
7 February	2019 Premier League Darts, Night 1 Newcastle upon Tyne, England	Does not apply.			
9 February	2019 PDC Players Championship 1 Wigan, England	(Netherlands) Michael van Gerwen	(Netherlands) Jermaine Wattimena	(England) Scott Baker (Scotland) Peter Wright	(Wales) Jonny Clayton (Australia) Kyle Anderson (England) Harry Ward (England) Michael Smith
10 February	2019 PDC Players Championship 2 Wigan, England	(England) Dave Chisnall	(England) Glen Durrant	(Wales) Jonny Clayton (England) Joe Cullen	(Netherlands) Michael van Gerwen (England) James Wade (England) Ryan Searle (Scotland) John Henderson
14 February	2019 Premier League Darts, Night 2 Glasgow, Scotland	Does not apply.			
16 February	2019 PDC Asian Tour 3 Kobe, Japan	(Japan) Haruki Muramatsu	(Japan) Seigo Asada	(Philippines) Noel Malicdem (Hong Kong) Royden Lam	(Japan) Kensei Sagawa (Philippines) Lourence Ilagan (Japan) Yuta Hamabe (Philippines) Melvin Kent Pelona
16 February	2019 PDC Players Championship 3 Wigan, England	(Netherlands) Michael van Gerwen	(England) Ian White	(England) Mervyn King (England) Chris Dobey	(Northern Ireland) Gavin Carlin (England) Steve West (Scotland) John Henderson (Scotland) Peter Wright
17 February	2019 PDC Asian Tour 4 Kobe, Japan	(Japan) Seigo Asada	(Hong Kong) Royden Lam	(Singapore) Paul Lim (Hong Kong) Kai Fan Leung	(Philippines) Michael Viola (Philippines) Lourence Ilagan (Philippines) Christian Perez (Japan) Haruki Muramatsu
17 February	2019 PDC Players Championship 4 Wigan, England	(England) Glen Durrant	(Belgium) Dimitri Van den Bergh	(Wales) Gerwyn Price (England) Rob Cross	(England) Nathan Aspinall (England) Bradley Brooks (Australia) Kyle Anderson (England) Matthew Edgar
21 February	2019 Premier League Darts, Night 3 Dublin, Republic of Ireland	Does not apply.			
22 February	2019 European Tour 1 – UK Qualifier; Barnsley, England	Does not apply.			
22 February	2019 European Tour 1 – South/West Europe Qualifier; Barnsley, England	Does not apply.			
22 February	2019 European Tour 2 – UK Qualifier; Barnsley, England	Does not apply.			
22 February	2019 European Tour 2 – South/West Europe Qualifier; Barnsley, England	Does not apply.			
23 February	2019 EADC Tour 1 Moscow, Russia	(Russia) Aleksei Kadochnikov	(Belarus) Andrey Pontus	(Russia) Andrey Pryalkin (Russia) Anton Kolesov	(Russia) Vladimir Pisarev (Russia) Maxim Belov (Russia) Oleg Soldatov (Russia) Roman Obukhov
23 February	2019 EADC Tour 2 Moscow, Russia	(Belarus) Andrey Pontus	(Russia) Dmitriy Gorbunov	(Russia) Maxim Belov (Russia) Maxim Aldoshin	(Russia) Aleksei Kadochnikov (Russia) Pavel Levenkov (Russia) Dmitry Zhavoronkov (Russia) Roman Obukhov
23 February	2019 PDC Players Championship 5 Barnsley, England	(Wales) Gerwyn Price	(Germany) Gabriel Clemens	(England) Dave Chisnall (Netherlands) Danny Noppert	(England) Ian White (England) James Wade (Scotland) John Henderson (England) Ryan Searle
24 February	2019 EADC Tour 3 Moscow, Russia	(Russia) Aleksei Kadochnikov	(Russia) Maxim Aldoshin	(Belarus) Andrey Pontus (Russia) Roman Obukhov	(Russia) Dmitry Gorbunov (Russia) Anton Kolesov (Russia) Dmitry Zhavoronkov (Russia) Vladimir Akshulakov
24 February	2019 PDC Players Championship 6 Barnsley, England	(Wales) Gerwyn Price	(England) Ricky Evans	(Netherlands) Danny Noppert (England) Nathan Aspinall	(Scotland) John Henderson (Australia) Kyle Anderson (Netherlands) Jermaine Wattimena (England) Adrian Lewis
28 February	2019 Premier League Darts, Night 4 Exeter, England	Does not apply.			

== March ==
Date	Tournament	Champions	Runners-up	Semi-finalists	Quarter-finalists
1 March	2019 DPA Tour 5 Brisbane, Australia	(New Zealand) Ben Robb	(Australia) Koha Kokiri	(Australia) Damon Heta (Australia) James Bailey	(Australia) Stewart Smith (Australia) Steve Fitzpatrick (Australia) David Platt (Australia) Raymond Smith
1–3 March	2019 UK Open Minehead, England	(England) Nathan Aspinall	(England) Rob Cross	(Wales) Gerwyn Price (England) Michael Smith	(England) Josh Payne (England) Steve Beaton (England) Simon Stevenson (England) Ross Smith
2 March	2019 DPA Tour 6 Brisbane, Australia	(Australia) David Littleboy	(New Zealand) Haupai Puha	(Australia) Steve Fitzpatrick (Australia) Bill Aitken	(Australia) Damon Heta (Australia) Gordon Mathers (Australia) Tim Pusey (Australia) Shane Tichowitsch
2 March	2019 DPA Tour 7 Brisbane, Australia	(Australia) Damon Heta	(Australia) Raymond Smith	(Australia) Bill Aitken (Australia) Jamie Rundle	(Australia) Rob Modra (New Zealand) Haupai Puha (Australia) Shane Tichowitsch (Australia) James Bailey
3 March	2019 DPA Tour 8 Brisbane, Australia	(Australia) James Bailey	(Australia) David Platt	(Australia) Brad Thorp (Australia) Tim Pusey	(Australia) Damon Heta (Australia) Mick Lacey (Australia) Rhys Mathewson (Australia) Koha Kokiri
7 March	2019 Premier League Darts, Night 5 Aberdeen, Scotland	Does not apply.			
8 March	2019 European Tour 7 – Nordic & Baltic Qualifier; Slangerup, Denmark	Does not apply.			
8 March	2019 European Tour 9 – Nordic & Baltic Qualifier; Slangerup, Denmark	Does not apply.			
9 March	2019 European Tour 5 – Eastern Europe Qualifier; Budapest, Hungary	Does not apply.			
9 March	2019 European Tour 6 – Eastern Europe Qualifier; Budapest, Hungary	Does not apply.			
9 March	2019 PDC Nordic & Baltic Tour 3 Slangerup, Denmark	(Latvia) Madars Razma	(Lithuania) Darius Labanauskas	(Sweden) Dennis Nilsson (Finland) Marko Kantele	(Sweden) Johan Engström (Denmark) Steen Lysen (Sweden) Andreas Harrysson (Sweden) Oskar Lukasiak
9 March	2019 European Tour 10 – Nordic & Baltic Qualifier; Slangerup, Denmark	Does not apply.			
9 March	2019 PDC Development Tour 1 Wigan, England	(England) Ted Evetts	(Northern Ireland) Nathan Rafferty	(Scotland) Andrew Davidson (Netherlands) Geert Nentjes	(England) Jim Moston (England) Harry Ward (Wales) Benjamin Smith (England) George Killington
9 March	2019 PDC Development Tour 2 Wigan, England	(Northern Ireland) Nathan Rafferty	(England) Aiden Cope	(Netherlands) Wessel Nijman (Republic of Ireland) Keane Barry	(England) Callan Rydz (Netherlands) Jeffrey de Zwaan (England) Luke Humphries (Wales) Hywel Manuel
10 March	2019 European Tour 7 – Eastern Europe Qualifier; Budapest, Hungary	Does not apply.			
10 March	2019 European Tour 8 – Eastern Europe Qualifier; Budapest, Hungary	Does not apply.			
10 March	2019 PDC Nordic & Baltic Tour 4 Slangerup, Denmark	(Sweden) Dennis Nilsson	(Latvia) Madars Razma	(Finland) Ulf Ceder (Lithuania) Darius Labanauskas	(Denmark) Vladimir Andersen (Sweden) Oskar Lukasiak (Denmark) Brian Løkken (Gibraltar) Hannu Suominen
10 March	2019 European Tour 8 – Nordic & Baltic Qualifier; Slangerup, Denmark	Does not apply.			
10 March	2019 PDC Development Tour 3 Wigan, England	(England) Ryan Meikle	(Scotland) Greg Ritchie	(Republic of Ireland) Ciaran Teehan (Netherlands) Geert Nentjes	(Netherlands) Justin van Tergouw (Republic of Ireland) Keane Barry (Scotland) William Borland (Netherlands) Jeffrey de Zwaan
10 March	2019 PDC Development Tour 4 Wigan, England	(England) Ted Evetts	(Scotland) Andrew Davidson	(England) Callan Rydz (Republic of Ireland) Keane Barry	(England) Jack Main (Netherlands) Patrick van den Boogaard (England) Ben Cheeseman (Scotland) William Borland
14 March	2019 Premier League Darts, Night 6 Nottingham, England	Does not apply.			
15 March	2019 European Tour 3 – UK Qualifier; Wigan, England	Does not apply.			
15 March	2019 European Tour 3 – South/West Europe Qualifier; Wigan, England	Does not apply.			
15 March	2019 European Tour 4 – UK Qualifier; Wigan, England	Does not apply.			
15 March	2019 European Tour 4 – South/West Europe Qualifier; Wigan, England	Does not apply.			
16 March	2019 PDC Players Championship 7 Wigan, England	(England) Dave Chisnall	(Northern Ireland) Daryl Gurney	(England) Mark McGeeney (Wales) Gerwyn Price	(Netherlands) Ron Meulenkamp (Netherlands) Vincent van der Voort (England) Ryan Searle (Netherlands) Jermaine Wattimena
17 March	2019 PDC Players Championship 8 Wigan, England	(England) Adrian Lewis	(Netherlands) Raymond van Barneveld	(Wales) Jonny Clayton (England) Keegan Brown	(England) Ian White (Netherlands) Vincent van der Voort (England) Andy Boulton (Netherlands) Jan Dekker
21 March	2019 Premier League Darts, Night 7 Berlin, Germany	Does not apply.			
21 March	2019 European Tour 1 – Host Nation Qualifier; Leverkusen, Germany	Does not apply.			
21 March	2019 European Tour 1 – Associate Member Qualifier; Leverkusen, Germany	Does not apply.			
22–24 March	2019 European Darts Open Leverkusen, Germany	(Netherlands) Michael van Gerwen	(England) Rob Cross	(Austria) Mensur Suljović (Scotland) Peter Wright	(Wales) Gerwyn Price (England) James Wade (England) Justin Pipe (Northern Ireland) Daryl Gurney
27 March	2019 Premier League Darts, Night 8A; Rotterdam, Netherlands	Does not apply.			
28 March	2019 European Tour 2 – Host Nation Qualifier; Hildesheim, Germany	Does not apply.			
28 March	2019 European Tour 2 – Associate Member Qualifier; Hildesheim, Germany	Does not apply.			
28 March	2019 Premier League Darts, Night 8B; Rotterdam, Netherlands	Does not apply.			
29–31 March	2019 German Darts Championship Hildesheim, Germany	(Northern Ireland) Daryl Gurney	(England) Ricky Evans	(England) Keegan Brown (England) Adrian Lewis	(Wales) Gerwyn Price (England) Darren Webster (England) Stephen Bunting (Scotland) Peter Wright
30 March	2019 PDC Asian Tour 5 Palo, Philippines	(Philippines) Noel Malicdem	(Taiwan) Teng Lieh Pupo	(Philippines) Andy Lou Villamor (Japan) Seigo Asada	(Philippines) Charlie Morris (Hong Kong) Kai Fan Leung (Philippines) Christian Perez (Philippines) Lourence Ilagan
30 March	2019 CDC Pro Tour 1 Philadelphia, United States	(United States) Darin Young	(Canada) Dave Richardson	(United States) Leonard Gates (Canada) Gary Mawson	(United States) Joe Chaney (United States) Chris White (Canada) Kiley Edmunds (Canada) Matt Campbell
31 March	2019 PDC Asian Tour 6 Palo, Philippines	(Philippines) Lourence Ilagan	(Japan) Yuki Yamada	(Philippines) Noel Malicdem (Philippines) Paolo Nebrida	(Philippines) Dioleto Peresores (Philippines) Mark Anthony Opada (Hong Kong) Royden Lam (Philippines) Sony De Leon
31 March	2019 CDC Pro Tour 2 Philadelphia, United States	(Canada) Jim Long	(United States) Darin Young	(United States) Alex Reyes (United States) Joe Huffman	(Canada) Ross Snook (Canada) Kiley Edmunds (Canada) David Cameron (Canada) Gary Mawson

== April ==
Date	Tournament	Champions	Runners-up	Semi-finalists	Quarter-finalists
4 April	2019 Premier League Darts, Night 9 Belfast, Northern Ireland	Does not apply.			
5 April	2019 DPA Tour 9 Devonport, Australia	(Australia) Gordon Mathers	(New Zealand) Ben Robb	(Australia) Mick Lacey (Australia) Koha Kokiri	(Australia) Damon Heta (Australia) Tim Pusey (Australia) James Bailey (Australia) Ryan Lynch
6 April	2019 DPA Tour 10 Devonport, Australia	(Australia) James Bailey	(Australia) Mick Lacey	(Australia) Raymond O'Donnell (Australia) Raymond Smith	(New Zealand) Ben Robb (Australia) Tim Pusey (Australia) Lucas Cameron (Australia) Mike Bonser
6 April	2019 DPA Tour 11 Devonport, Australia	(Australia) Gordon Mathers	(Australia) Damon Heta	(Australia) Mick Lacey (Australia) Koha Kokiri	(New Zealand) Ben Robb (New Zealand) Haupai Puha (Australia) Brad Thorp (Australia) Robbie King
6 April	2019 PDC Players Championship 9 Barnsley, England	(England) James Wade	(England) Michael Smith	(England) Steve West (England) Scott Baker	(England) Ian White (England) Steve Beaton (England) Adrian Lewis (Portugal) José de Sousa
7 April	2019 DPA Tour 12 Devonport, Australia	(Australia) Raymond O'Donnell	(Australia) Shane Tichowitsch	(Australia) Steve Fitzpatrick (Australia) Bill Aitken	(Australia) Lucas Cameron (Australia) Damon Heta (Australia) Jamie Rundle (New Zealand) Haupai Puha
7 April	2019 PDC Players Championship 10 Barnsley, England	(Wales) Jonny Clayton	(Germany) Gabriel Clemens	(England) Ian White (Poland) Tytus Kanik	(England) Arron Monk (Netherlands) Jermaine Wattimena (England) Mervyn King (Spain) Jose Justicia
11 April	2019 Premier League Darts, Night 10; Liverpool, England	Does not apply.			
12 April	2019 European Tour 5 – UK Qualifier; Barnsley, England	Does not apply.			
12 April	2019 European Tour 5 – South/West Europe Qualifier; Barnsley, England	Does not apply.			
12 April	2019 European Tour 6 – UK Qualifier; Barnsley, England	Does not apply.			
12 April	2019 European Tour 6 – South/West Europe Qualifier; Barnsley, England	Does not apply.			
13 April	2019 PDC Players Championship 11 Barnsley, England	(England) James Wade	(England) Michael Smith	(England) Ian White (England) Steve West	(England) Andy Boulton (Wales) Jonny Clayton (England) Glen Durrant (Netherlands) Jelle Klaasen
14 April	2019 PDC Players Championship 12 Barnsley, England	(England) James Wade	(Netherlands) Jeffrey de Zwaan	(England) Michael Smith (Scotland) John Henderson	(England) Ian White (Wales) Jonny Clayton (Netherlands) Danny Noppert (England) Glen Durrant
18 April	2019 Premier League Darts, Night 11; Cardiff, Wales	Does not apply.			
19 April	2019 European Tour 3 – Host Nation Qualifier; Munich, Germany	Does not apply.			
19 April	2019 European Tour 3 – Associate Member Qualifier; Munich, Germany	Does not apply.			
20–22 April	2019 German Darts Grand Prix Munich, Germany	(Netherlands) Michael van Gerwen	(Australia) Simon Whitlock	(England) Rob Cross (Germany) Max Hopp	(England) Ted Evetts (Austria) Mensur Suljović (Czech Republic) Karel Sedláček (England) Joe Cullen
20 April	2019 PDC Development Tour 5 Wigan, England	(Netherlands) Jeffrey de Zwaan	(Netherlands) Geert Nentjes	(Republic of Ireland) Ciaran Teehan (Netherlands) Danny van Trijp	(England) Bradley Clark (Germany) Seppe Giebens (Netherlands) Mike van Duivenbode (England) Callan Rydz
20 April	2019 PDC Development Tour 6 Wigan, England	(Australia) Corey Cadby	(England) Luke Humphries	(Austria) Rusty-Jake Rodriguez (Wales) Justin Smith	(Netherlands) Jeffrey de Zwaan (Republic of Ireland) Shane McGuirk (Scotland) William Borland (Belgium) Mike De Decker
21 April	2019 PDC Development Tour 7 Wigan, England	(England) Ryan Meikle	(Scotland) Andrew Davidson	(England) Harry Ward (England) Bradley Clark	(England) Callan Rydz (Netherlands) Geert Nentjes (England) Thomas Lovely (Wales) Luke Humphreys
21 April	2019 PDC Development Tour 8 Wigan, England	(England) Callan Rydz	(England) Luke Humphries	(England) Jarred Cole (Belgium) Mike De Decker	(England) Connor Scutt (England) Scott Hope (England) Kieran Brignell (Netherlands) Kevin Doets
25 April	2019 Premier League Darts, Night 12; Birmingham, England	Does not apply.			
25 April	2019 European Tour 4 – Host Nation Qualifier; Saarbrücken, Germany	Does not apply.			
25 April	2019 European Tour 4 – Associate Member Qualifier; Saarbrücken, Germany	Does not apply.			
26–28 April	2019 German Darts Open Saarbrücken, Germany	(Netherlands) Michael van Gerwen	(England) Ian White	(England) Dave Chisnall (England) Rob Cross	(England) Nathan Aspinall (Austria) Mensur Suljović (England) Adrian Lewis (Wales) Gerwyn Price
27 April	2019 EADC Tour 4 Moscow, Russia	(Russia) Boris Koltsov	(Russia) Roman Obukhov	(Belarus) Andrey Pontus (Russia) Aleksei Kadochnikov	(Russia) Evgenii Izotov (Russia) Maxim Aldoshin (Russia) Aleksandr Nelaev (Russia) Andrey Pryalkin
27 April	2019 EADC Tour 5 Moscow, Russia	(Russia) Boris Koltsov	(Russia) Roman Obukhov	(Belarus) Andrey Pontus (Russia) Aleksei Kadochnikov	(Russia) Evgenii Izotov (Russia) Maxim Aldoshin (Russia) Maxim Belov (Russia) Dmitriy Gorbunov
28 April	2019 EADC Tour 6 Moscow, Russia	(Russia) Boris Koltsov	(Russia) Roman Obukhov	(Russia) Aleksei Kadochnikov (Russia) Andrey Pryalkin	(Russia) Dmitriy Gorbunov (Russia) Evgenii Izotov (Russia) Dmitri Shepkin (Belarus) Dmitry Lushankov
30 April	2019 PDC Players Championship 13 Barnsley, England	(Republic of Ireland) William O'Connor	(England) Nathan Aspinall	(England) Adrian Lewis (Northern Ireland) Daryl Gurney	(Netherlands) Christian Kist (Scotland) Peter Wright (Netherlands) Jeffrey de Zwaan (England) Justin Pipe

== May ==
Date	Tournament	Champions	Runners-up	Semi-finalists	Quarter-finalists
1 May	2019 PDC Players Championship 14 Barnsley, England	(Netherlands) Jeffrey de Zwaan	(England) Stephen Bunting	(Lithuania) Darius Labanauskas (England) Arron Monk	(England) Joe Cullen (England) Harry Ward (Poland) Krzysztof Ratajski (England) Ryan Joyce
2 May	2019 DPA Tour 13 Dubbo, Australia	(Australia) James Bailey	(Australia) Ryan Lynch	(Australia) Steve Fitzpatrick (Australia) Robbie King	(Australia) Dave Marland (Australia) Damon Heta (New Zealand) Haupai Puha (Australia) Mick Lacey
2 May	2019 Premier League Darts, Night 13; Manchester, England	Does not apply.			
2 May	2019 European Tour 5 – Host Nation Qualifier; Premstätten, Austria	Does not apply.			
2 May	2019 European Tour 5 – Associate Member Qualifier; Premstätten, Austria	Does not apply.			
3 May	2019 DPA Tour 14 Dubbo, Australia	(Australia) Robbie King	(New Zealand) Ben Robb	(Australia) Damon Heta (Australia) Raymond O'Donnell	(Australia) Bill Aitken (Australia) Steve Fitzpatrick (Australia) James Bailey (New Zealand) Haupai Puha
3 May	2019 DPA Tour 15 Dubbo, Australia	(New Zealand) Haupai Puha	(New Zealand) Ben Robb	(Australia) Damon Heta (Australia) Robbie King	(Australia) Bill Aitken (Australia) Steve Fitzpatrick (Australia) James Bailey (Australia) Koha Kokiri
3–5 May	2019 Austrian Darts Open Premstätten, Austria	(Netherlands) Michael van Gerwen	(England) Ian White	(Northern Ireland) Daryl Gurney (England) James Wade	(Scotland) Peter Wright (England) Adrian Lewis (Wales) Gerwyn Price (England) Steve Beaton
4 May	2019 DPA Tour 16 Dubbo, Australia	(Australia) Robbie King	(Australia) Steve Fitzpatrick	(Australia) Damon Heta (Australia) Raymond O'Donnell	(Australia) Paul Cotton (New Zealand) Ben Robb (Australia) Ryan Lynch (New Zealand) Haupai Puha
4 May	2019 DPA Tour 17 Dubbo, Australia	(Australia) Koha Kokiri	(Australia) Steve Fitzpatrick	(Australia) Damon Heta (Australia) James Bailey	(Australia) Bill Aitken (New Zealand) Ben Robb (Australia) Dave Marland (Australia) David Littleboy
4 May	2019 CDC Pro Tour 3 Waterdown, Canada	(United States) Darin Young	(Canada) Jeff Smith	(United States) DJ Sayre (Canada) Jeremiah Millar	(United States) Danny Pace (Canada) Kiley Edmunds (Canada) Kiefer Durham (Canada) Dave Fatum
5 May	2019 DPA Tour 18 Dubbo, Australia	(New Zealand) Haupai Puha	(Australia) Koha Kokiri	(Australia) Josh Townsend (Australia) Mick Lacey	(Australia) Ryan Lynch (Australia) Dale Burton-Pye (Australia) Steve Fitzpatrick (Australia) Brendon McCausland
5 May	2019 CDC Pro Tour 4 Waterdown, Canada	(United States) Dan Lauby Jr	(United States) Joe Huffman	(Canada) Dave Fatum (Canada) Shawn Brenneman	(United States) Darin Young (United States) Leonard Gates (United States) Larry Butler (United States) DJ Sayre
9 May	2019 Premier League Darts, Night 14; Sheffield, England	Does not apply.			
9 May	2019 European Tour 6 – Host Nation Qualifier; Sindelfingen, Germany	Does not apply.			
9 May	2019 European Tour 6 – Associate Member Qualifier; Sindelfingen, Germany	Does not apply.			
10–12 May	2019 European Darts Grand Prix Sindelfingen, Germany	(England) Ian White	(Scotland) Peter Wright	(England) Jamie Hughes (England) Steve Beaton	(Netherlands) Michael van Gerwen (England) Nathan Aspinall (England) Darren Webster (Netherlands) Jeffrey de Zwaan
11 May	2019 PDC Challenge Tour 5 Wigan, England	(Scotland) Darren Beveridge	(England) Callan Rydz	(England) Andy Jenkins (England) Andy Chalmers	(Netherlands) Berry van Peer (Republic of Ireland) Jason Cullen (Sweden) Dennis Nilsson (Northern Ireland) Kyle McKinstry
11 May	2019 PDC Challenge Tour 6 Wigan, England	(Scotland) Cameron Menzies	(England) Andrew Gilding	(England) Tony Mitchell (Russia) Boris Koltsov	(Republic of Ireland) Francis Carragher (Netherlands) Danny van Trijp (Netherlands) Berry van Peer (England) Andy Jenkins
12 May	2019 PDC Challenge Tour 7 Wigan, England	(Spain) Jesús Noguera	(England) Mark Walsh	(Netherlands) Arjan Konterman (England) Stephen Burton	(England) Scott Taylor (England) James Barton (England) Callan Rydz (England) Andy Jenkins
12 May	2019 PDC Challenge Tour 8 Wigan, England	(England) Stephen Burton	(Netherlands) Patrick van den Boogaard	(England) Dave Prins (England) Kevin Garcia	(England) Ian Withers (England) Paul Rowley (Wales) Kevin Lane (Wales) Rhys Griffin
16 May	2019 Premier League Darts, Night 15; Leeds, England	Does not apply.			
17 May	2019 European Tour 7 – UK Qualifier; Barnsley, England	Does not apply.			
17 May	2019 European Tour 7 – South/West Europe Qualifier; Barnsley, England	Does not apply.			
17 May	2019 European Tour 8 – UK Qualifier; Barnsley, England	Does not apply.			
17 May	2019 European Tour 8 – South/West Europe Qualifier; Barnsley, England	Does not apply.			
18 May	2019 PDC Players Championship 15 Barnsley, England	(England) Glen Durrant	(Lithuania) Darius Labanauskas	(Netherlands) Michael van Gerwen (Netherlands) Ron Meulenkamp	(England) Chris Dobey (England) Michael Smith (England) Ian White (England) Ryan Meikle
18 May	2019 European Tour 7 – Associate Member Qualifier; Hildesheim, Germany	Does not apply.			
18 May	2019 European Tour 8 – Associate Member Qualifier; Hildesheim, Germany	Does not apply.			
19 May	2019 PDC Players Championship 16 Barnsley, England	(England) Harry Ward	(Germany) Max Hopp	(Scotland) Robert Thornton (Portugal) José de Sousa	(England) Chris Dobey (Netherlands) Danny Noppert (England) Nathan Aspinall (England) Scott Taylor
19 May	2019 European Tour 9 – Associate Member Qualifier; Hildesheim, Germany	Does not apply.			
23 May	2019 Premier League Play-Offs London, England	(Netherlands) Michael van Gerwen	(England) Rob Cross	(Northern Ireland) Daryl Gurney (England) James Wade	Does not apply.
23 May	2019 European Tour 7 – Host Nation Qualifier; Zwolle, Netherlands	Does not apply.			
24–26 May	2019 Dutch Darts Masters Zwolle, Netherlands	(England) Ian White	(Netherlands) Michael van Gerwen	(Wales) Gerwyn Price (Scotland) Peter Wright	(England) Dave Chisnall (England) Glen Durrant (Netherlands) Vincent van der Voort (England) Mervyn King
31 May	2019 DPA Tour 19 Barooga, Australia	(New Zealand) Ben Robb	(Australia) James Bailey	(Australia) Damon Heta (Australia) Koha Kokiri	(Australia) Peter Sutton (Australia) Steve Fitzpatrick (Australia) Robbie King (New Zealand) Haupai Puha

== June ==
Date	Tournament	Champions	Runners-up	Semi-finalists	Quarter-finalists
1 June	2019 DPA Tour 20 Barooga, Australia	(Australia) Damon Heta	(Australia) Koha Kokiri	(Australia) Steve Fitzpatrick (Australia) Robbie King	(Australia) Mick Lacey (New Zealand) Ben Robb (Australia) Ryan Lynch (New Zealand) Haupai Puha
1 June	2019 DPA Tour 21 Barooga, Australia	(New Zealand) Haupai Puha	(Australia) Damon Heta	(New Zealand) Ben Robb (Australia) James Bailey	(Australia) Mick Lacey (Australia) Steve Fitzpatrick (Australia) Robbie King (Australia) Lucas Cameron
1 June	2019 CDC Pro Tour 5 Skokie, United States	(Canada) Matt Campbell	(United States) Darin Young	(Canada) Jeff Smith (United States) Isen Veljic	(United States) Joe Beecroft (United States) Joe Huffman (Canada) Dave Fatum (United States) Jeremiah Millar
2 June	2019 DPA Tour 22 Barooga, Australia	(Australia) Damon Heta	(Australia) James Bailey	(Australia) Steve Fitzpatrick (Australia) Raymond O'Donnell	(Australia) Gordon Mathers (New Zealand) Haupai Puha (Australia) Koha Kokiri (Australia) Mick Lacey
2 June	2019 CDC Pro Tour 6 Skokie, United States	(United States) Joe Huffman	(Canada) Matt Campbell	(United States) Joe Chaney (United States) Chuck Puleo	(United States) Darin Young (United States) Larry Butler (United States) Jimmy Damore (United States) Dan Lauby Jr
6–9 June	2019 PDC World Cup of Darts Hamburg, Germany	(Scotland) Anderson/Wright	(Republic of Ireland) Lennon/O'Connor	(Netherlands) van Gerwen/Wattimena (Japan) Asada/Muramatsu	(Austria) Suljović/Lerchbacher (Canada) Murschell/Long (Belgium) Huybrechts/Van den Bergh (New Zealand) Harris/Puha
8 June	2019 PDC Development Tour 9 Milton Keynes, England	(Netherlands) Geert Nentjes	(Republic of Ireland) Shane McGuirk	(Republic of Ireland) Ciaran Teehan (England) Carl Batchelor	(Netherlands) Owen Roelofs (England) Charlie Symons (England) George Killington (England) George Gardner
8 June	2019 PDC Development Tour 10 Milton Keynes, England	(England) Ted Evetts	(Republic of Ireland) Shane McGuirk	(Netherlands) Justin van Tergouw (England) George Killington	(Czech Republic) Roman Benecký (Netherlands) Niels Zonneveld (Wales) Justin Smith (England) Dom Taylor
9 June	2019 PDC Development Tour 11 Milton Keynes, England	(England) Luke Humphries	(Scotland) Greg Ritchie	(Scotland) William Borland (Australia) Corey Cadby	(Austria) Rusty-Jake Rodriguez (Netherlands) Geert Nentjes (Republic of Ireland) Keane Barry (England) Callum Matthews
9 June	2019 PDC Development Tour 12 Milton Keynes, England	(England) Ted Evetts	(England) Bradley Brooks	(England) Ryan Meikle (Netherlands) Geert Nentjes	(England) Jacob Gwynne (Scotland) Andrew Davidson (England) Connor Arberry (Netherlands) Owen Roelofs
13 June	2019 European Tour 8 – Host Nation Qualifier; Copenhagen, Denmark	Does not apply.			
14–16 June	2019 Danish Darts Open Copenhagen, Denmark	(England) Dave Chisnall	(England) Chris Dobey	(Wales) Jonny Clayton (Wales) Gerwyn Price	(Netherlands) Jermaine Wattimena (Australia) Simon Whitlock (Portugal) José de Sousa (England) Joe Cullen
21 June	2019 European Tour 9 – UK Qualifier; Wigan, England	Does not apply.			
21 June	2019 European Tour 9 – South/West Europe Qualifier; Wigan, England	Does not apply.			
21 June	2019 European Tour 10 – UK Qualifier; Wigan, England	Does not apply.			
21 June	2019 European Tour 10 – South/West Europe Qualifier; Wigan, England	Does not apply.			
22 June	2019 PDC Asian Tour 7 Taipei, Taiwan	(Philippines) Lourence Ilagan	(Philippines) Noel Malicdem	(Taiwan) Teng Lieh Pupo (Philippines) Melvin Kent Pelona	(Philippines) Paolo Nebrida (Singapore) Paul Lim (Japan) Keita Ono (Thailand) Attapol Eupakaree
22 June	2019 PDC Players Championship 17 Wigan, England	(Poland) Krzysztof Ratajski	(England) Nathan Aspinall	(England) James Wilson (Netherlands) Ron Meulenkamp	(England) Jamie Hughes (England) Luke Humphries (Belgium) Dimitri Van den Bergh (Russia) Boris Koltsov
22 June	2019 PDC Asian Tour 8 Taipei, Taiwan	(Philippines) Lourence Ilagan	(Philippines) Noel Malicdem	(Japan) Seigo Asada (Singapore) Paul Lim	(Taiwan) Teng Lieh Pupo (Hong Kong) Royden Lam (Japan) Mikuru Suzuki (Japan) Toru Suzuki
23 June	2019 PDC Players Championship 18 Wigan, England	(England) James Wade	(Portugal) José de Sousa	(Poland) Krzysztof Ratajski (Belgium) Dimitri Van den Bergh	(England) Luke Woodhouse (England) Callan Rydz (Republic of Ireland) William O'Connor (England) James Richardson
27 June	2019 European Tour 9 – Host Nation Qualifier; Prague, Czech Republic	Does not apply.			
27 June	2019 European Tour 9 – Eastern Europe Qualifier; Prague, Czech Republic	Does not apply.			
28–30 June	2019 Czech Darts Open Prague, Czech Republic	(England) Jamie Hughes	(England) Stephen Bunting	(England) Keegan Brown (Australia) Simon Whitlock	(Austria) Mensur Suljović (Northern Ireland) Daryl Gurney (England) Ian White (England) Mervyn King

== July ==
Date	Tournament	Champions	Runners-up	Semi-finalists	Quarter-finalists
4–5 July	2019 US Darts Masters Las Vegas, United States	(England) Nathan Aspinall	(England) Michael Smith	(Wales) Gerwyn Price (Scotland) Peter Wright	(Netherlands) Michael van Gerwen (Scotland) Gary Anderson (England) Rob Cross (Northern Ireland) Daryl Gurney
4 July	2019 North American Darts Championship Las Vegas, United States	(United States) Daniel Baggish	(Canada) Jeff Smith	(United States) Leonard Gates (United States) Darin Young	(United States) Elliot Milk (Canada) Shawn Brenneman (Canada) Jim Long (Canada) Gary Mawson
12–13 July	2019 German Darts Masters Cologne, Germany	(Scotland) Peter Wright	(Germany) Gabriel Clemens	(England) James Wade (Austria) Mensur Suljović	(Germany) Nico Kurz (Northern Ireland) Daryl Gurney (Germany) Martin Schindler (England) Rob Cross
13 July	2019 PDC Challenge Tour 9 Peterborough, England	(New Zealand) Cody Harris	(England) Martin Atkins (Wigan)	(England) Jason Wilson (England) Andy Jenkins	(Russia) Boris Koltsov (England) Andy Chalmers (England) Andrew Gilding (England) David Ladley
13 July	2019 PDC Challenge Tour 10 Peterborough, England	(England) Nick Fullwell	(Northern Ireland) Nathan Rafferty	(Republic of Ireland) Shane McGuirk (New Zealand) Cody Harris	(Northern Ireland) Kyle McKinstry (England) Paul Rowley (England) Scott Taylor (Netherlands) Mareno Michels
14 July	2019 PDC Challenge Tour 11 Peterborough, England	(Netherlands) Berry van Peer	(Scotland) Cameron Menzies	(Austria) Rusty-Jake Rodriguez (Netherlands) Arjan Konterman	(England) David Adshead (England) Andy Jenkins (England) Mark Frost (England) Peter Mitchell
14 July	2019 PDC Challenge Tour 12 Peterborough, England	(England) Andy Jenkins	(Russia) Boris Koltsov	(Wales) Justin Smith (Spain) Jesús Noguera	(England) Simon Preston (Austria) Michael Rasztovits (England) Colin Osborne (Austria) Christian Gödl
16 July	2019 PDC Players Championship 19 Barnsley, England	(Scotland) Peter Wright	(England) Justin Pipe	(Scotland) Gary Anderson (Netherlands) Ron Meulenkamp	(Germany) Gabriel Clemens (Netherlands) Vincent van der Voort (England) Ryan Joyce (England) Harry Ward
17 July	2019 PDC Players Championship 20 Barnsley, England	(Scotland) Peter Wright	(England) Joe Cullen	(England) Adrian Gray (England) Adrian Lewis	(England) Steve Beaton (South Africa) Devon Petersen (England) Rob Cross (Netherlands) Jan Dekker
20–28 July	2019 World Matchplay Blackpool, England	(England) Rob Cross	(England) Michael Smith	(England) Glen Durrant (Northern Ireland) Daryl Gurney	(England) James Wade (England) Mervyn King (England) Stephen Bunting (Scotland) Peter Wright
27 July	2019 PDC Asian Tour 9 Hong Kong, Hong Kong	(Singapore) Paul Lim	(China) Zong Xiao Chen	(Philippines) Ryan Ocampo (Philippines) Noel Malicdem	(Philippines) Michael Viola (Philippines) Paolo Nebrida (Philippines) Alexis Toylo (Japan) Haruki Muramatsu
28 July	2019 PDC Asian Tour 10 Hong Kong, Hong Kong	(Japan) Yuki Yamada	(Singapore) Paul Lim	(Hong Kong) Ki Fu Ng (Japan) Haruki Muramatsu	(Japan) Kunimasa Makuichi (Philippines) Melvin Kent Pelona (Hong Kong) Kai Fan Leung (Philippines) Noel Malicdem

== August ==
Date	Tournament	Champions	Runners-up	Semi-finalists	Quarter-finalists
2 August	2019 European Tour 11 – UK Qualifier; Hildesheim, Germany	Does not apply.			
2 August	2019 European Tour 11 – South/West Europe Qualifier; Hildesheim, Germany	Does not apply.			
2 August	2019 European Tour 12 – UK Qualifier; Hildesheim, Germany	Does not apply.			
2 August	2019 European Tour 12 – South/West Europe Qualifier; Hildesheim, Germany	Does not apply.			
3 August	2019 PDC Players Championship 21 Hildesheim, Germany	(Poland) Krzysztof Ratajski	(Belgium) Dimitri Van den Bergh	(England) Ian White (Netherlands) Danny Noppert	(Austria) Mensur Suljović (Netherlands) Ron Meulenkamp (England) Michael Smith (Northern Ireland) Mickey Mansell
4 August	2019 PDC Players Championship 22 Hildesheim, Germany	(Northern Ireland) Brendan Dolan	(Netherlands) Jermaine Wattimena	(Austria) Mensur Suljović (New Zealand) Cody Harris	(England) Ian White (England) Steve Beaton (England) Glen Durrant (Poland) Krzysztof Ratajski
9–10 August	2019 Brisbane Darts Masters Brisbane, Australia	(Australia) Damon Heta	(England) Rob Cross	(Australia) Simon Whitlock (Northern Ireland) Daryl Gurney	(Australia) Kyle Anderson (Scotland) Gary Anderson (Netherlands) Raymond van Barneveld (Netherlands) Michael van Gerwen
10 August	2019 PDC Challenge Tour 13 Wolverhampton, England	(Scotland) Cameron Menzies	(Netherlands) Wessel Nijman	(Austria) Rusty-Jake Rodriguez (England) Scott Waites	(England) Eddie Lovely (Sweden) Dennis Nilsson (New Zealand) Cody Harris (England) Curtis Hammond
10 August	2019 PDC Challenge Tour 14 Wolverhampton, England	(England) Patrick Lynskey	(England) David Evans	(Sweden) Dennis Nilsson (Netherlands) Wessel Nijman	(England) Scott Taylor (England) Craig Quinn (Russia) Boris Koltsov (Austria) Christian Gödl
10 August	2019 CDC Pro Tour 7 Wheeling, United States	(Canada) Jeremiah Millar	(Canada) Matt Campbell	(Canada) Jim Long (United States) Joe Huffman	(United States) Darin Young (Canada) Gary Mawson (Canada) Jeff Smith (United States) Leonard Gates
11 August	2019 PDC Challenge Tour 15 Wolverhampton, England	(Spain) Jesús Noguera	(Northern Ireland) Kyle McKinstry	(England) Wes Newton (England) Ritchie Edhouse	(England) James Lawson (Republic of Ireland) Martin O'Boyle (England) Kevin Garcia (England) Mark Walsh
11 August	2019 PDC Challenge Tour 16 Wolverhampton, England	(England) Callan Rydz	(England) David Evans	(England) Adam Huckvale (Wales) Justin Smith	(England) Steve Hine (England) Peter Mitchell (England) Rhys Hayden (England) Kevin Garcia
11 August	2019 CDC Pro Tour 8 Wheeling, United States	(Canada) Matt Campbell	(Canada) Kiley Edmunds	(United States) Nick Linberg (United States) Jason Brandon	(United States) Joe Beecroft (United States) Larry Butler (United States) Chuck Puleo (Canada) Jeff Smith
16–17 August	2019 Melbourne Darts Masters Melbourne, Australia	(Netherlands) Michael van Gerwen	(Northern Ireland) Daryl Gurney	(Scotland) Peter Wright (England) Rob Cross	(Netherlands) Raymond van Barneveld (Scotland) Gary Anderson (Australia) Damon Heta (Australia) Simon Whitlock
17 August	2019 PDC Development Tour 13 Hildesheim, Germany	(Republic of Ireland) Shane McGuirk	(Republic of Ireland) Keane Barry	(Northern Ireland) Nathan Rafferty (England) Luke Humphries	(England) Lewis Pride (England) Kieran Spurdle (Netherlands) Jeffrey de Zwaan (Netherlands) Jurjen van der Velde
17 August	2019 PDC Development Tour 14 Hildesheim, Germany	(England) Ted Evetts	(Netherlands) Owen Roelofs	(Netherlands) Wessel Nijman (Czech Republic) Adam Gawlas	(England) Dom Taylor (England) Bradley Brooks (Netherlands) Berry van Peer (Belgium) Mike De Decker
18 August	2019 PDC Development Tour 15 Hildesheim, Germany	(Netherlands) Geert Nentjes	(Scotland) Nathan Girvan	(England) Joe Davis (Netherlands) Jeffrey de Zwaan	(England) Luke Humphries (Scotland) William Borland (Germany) Marc Legant (Netherlands) Danny van Trijp
18 August	2019 PDC Development Tour 16 Hildesheim, Germany	(England) Ted Evetts	(Republic of Ireland) Ciaran Teehan	(Republic of Ireland) Keane Barry (England) Lewis Pride	(England) Bradley Brooks (England) Luke Humphries (Netherlands) Danny van Trijp (Netherlands) Niels Zonneveld
23–24 August	2019 New Zealand Darts Masters Hamilton, New Zealand	(Netherlands) Michael van Gerwen	(Netherlands) Raymond van Barneveld	(England) James Wade (England) Rob Cross	(Scotland) Peter Wright (Northern Ireland) Daryl Gurney (Scotland) Gary Anderson (New Zealand) Ben Robb
23 August	2019 European Tour 11 – Nordic & Baltic Qualifier; Keflavík, Iceland	Does not apply.			
23 August	2019 European Tour 12 – Nordic & Baltic Qualifier; Keflavík, Iceland	Does not apply.			
24 August	2019 PDC Nordic & Baltic Tour 5 Keflavík, Iceland	(Lithuania) Darius Labanauskas	(Latvia) Madars Razma	(Finland) Marko Kantele (Sweden) Oskar Lukasiak	(Sweden) Roland Lenngren (Finland) Ulf Ceder (Sweden) Daniel Larsson (Sweden) Dennis Nilsson
24 August	2019 European Tour 13 – Nordic & Baltic Qualifier; Keflavík, Iceland	Does not apply.			
24 August	2019 European Tour 10 – Eastern Europe Qualifier; Bubeneč, Czech Republic	Does not apply.			
24 August	2019 European Tour 11 – Eastern Europe Qualifier; Bubeneč, Czech Republic	Does not apply.			
25 August	2019 PDC Nordic & Baltic Tour 6 Keflavík, Iceland	(Finland) Marko Kantele	(Sweden) Dennis Nilsson	(Latvia) Madars Razma (Sweden) Daniel Larsson	(Denmark) Søren Hedegaard (Denmark) Niels Heinsøe (Lithuania) Darius Labanauskas (Denmark) Ivan Springborg
25 August	2019 European Tour 12 – Eastern Europe Qualifier; Bubeneč, Czech Republic	Does not apply.			
25 August	2019 European Tour 13 – Eastern Europe Qualifier; Bubeneč, Czech Republic	Does not apply.			
29 August	2019 European Tour 10 – Host Nation Qualifier; Vienna, Austria	Does not apply.			
29 August	2019 European Tour 10 – Associate Member Qualifier; Vienna, Austria	Does not apply.			
30 August–1 September	2019 Austrian Darts Championship Vienna, Austria	(Austria) Mensur Suljović	(Netherlands) Michael van Gerwen	(Scotland) Peter Wright (Netherlands) Vincent van der Voort	(England) Ricky Evans (Austria) Rowby-John Rodriguez (England) Ian White (Scotland) Cameron Menzies
31 August	2019 PDC Asian Tour 11 Singapore, Singapore	(Japan) Seigo Asada	(Philippines) Noel Malicdem	(Taiwan) Teng Lieh Pupo (Japan) Haruki Muramatsu	(Philippines) Alexis Toylo (Philippines) Dolreich Toncopanon Jr (Singapore) Paul Lim (Japan) Yuki Yamada

== September ==
Date	Tournament	Champions	Runners-up	Semi-finalists	Quarter-finalists
1 September	2019 PDC Asian Tour 12 Singapore, Singapore	(Japan) Seigo Asada	(Philippines) Lourence Ilagan	(Philippines) Jayson Langcao (Japan) Yuki Yamada	(Philippines) Michael Viola (Singapore) Leslie Lee Shan Ping (Thailand) Thanawat Gaweenuntawong (Hong Kong) Kai Fan Leung
5 September	2019 European Tour 11 – Host Nation Qualifier; Mannheim, Germany	Does not apply.			
5 September	2019 European Tour 11 – Associate Member Qualifier; Mannheim, Germany	Does not apply.			
6–8 September	2019 European Darts Matchplay Mannheim, Germany	(England) Joe Cullen	(Netherlands) Michael van Gerwen	(England) Dave Chisnall (England) James Wade	(Poland) Krzysztof Ratajski (England) Rob Cross (Wales) Jonny Clayton (England) Glen Durrant
10 September	2019 PDC Players Championship 23 Barnsley, England	(Portugal) José de Sousa	(Wales) Gerwyn Price	(Scotland) Peter Wright (England) Adrian Lewis	(Netherlands) Michael van Gerwen (Netherlands) Jermaine Wattimena (Germany) Martin Schindler (England) Glen Durrant
11 September	2019 PDC Players Championship 24 Barnsley, England	(England) James Wade	(England) Dave Chisnall	(England) Scott Taylor (England) Jamie Hughes	(England) Justin Pipe (Netherlands) Jermaine Wattimena (England) James Wilson (Scotland) John Henderson
12 September	2019 European Tour 12 – Host Nation Qualifier; Riesa, Germany	Does not apply.			
12 September	2019 European Tour 12 – Associate Member Qualifier; Riesa, Germany	Does not apply.			
12 September	2019 European Tour 13 – Associate Member Qualifier; Riesa, Germany	Does not apply.			
13–15 September	2019 International Darts Open Riesa, Germany	(Wales) Gerwyn Price	(England) Rob Cross	(Scotland) Peter Wright (England) Glen Durrant	(England) Richard North (England) Adrian Lewis (England) Nathan Aspinall (Northern Ireland) Daryl Gurney
14 September	2019 CDC Pro Tour 9 Philadelphia, United States	(United States) Darin Young	(Canada) Jim Long	(United States) Dan Lauby Jr (United States) Larry Butler	(United States) Joe Huffman (United States) Sidney Vaughn (United States) Chuck Puleo (Canada) Gary Mawson
15 September	2019 CDC Pro Tour 10 Philadelphia, United States	(United States) Daniel Baggish	(United States) Joe Huffman	(Canada) Matt Campbell (United States) Chuck Puleo	(United States) Jason Brandon (United States) Dan Lauby Jr (United States) Larry Butler (Canada) Jeremiah Millar
20 September	2019 DPA Pro Tour 23 Melbourne, Australia	(Australia) Raymond O'Donnell	(Australia) Robbie King	(Australia) Damon Heta (Australia) Steve Fitzpatrick	(Australia) Rhys Mathewson (Australia) Mick Lacey (Australia) James Bailey (Australia) Gordon Mathers
20 September	2019 European Tour 13 – UK Qualifier; Barnsley, England	Does not apply.			
20 September	2019 European Tour 13 – South/West Europe Qualifier; Barnsley, England	Does not apply.			
21 September	2019 DPA Pro Tour 24 Melbourne, Australia	(Australia) Tim Pusey	(Australia) Gordon Mathers	(Australia) Mick Lacey (Australia) Raymond O'Donnell	(Australia) Michael Cassar (Australia) Rob Modra (Australia) James Bailey (Australia) Paul Cotton
21 September	2019 DPA Pro Tour 25 Melbourne, Australia	(Australia) Damon Heta	(Australia) Gordon Mathers	(Australia) Brandon Weening (Australia) Raymond Smith	(Australia) Tim Pusey (Australia) Mike Bonser (Australia) James Bailey (Australia) Steve Fitzpatrick
21 September	2019 PDC Players Championship 25 Barnsley, England	(Northern Ireland) Daryl Gurney	(England) Nathan Aspinall	(England) Ian White (England) Michael Smith	(Germany) Max Hopp (Scotland) Peter Wright (Austria) Mensur Suljović (England) Justin Pipe
22 September	2019 DPA Pro Tour 26 Melbourne, Australia	(Australia) Damon Heta	(Australia) Gordon Mathers	(Australia) Brody Klinge (Australia) Raymond Smith	(Australia) Tim Pusey (Australia) Brendon McCausland (Australia) Mick Lacey (Australia) Rob Modra
22 September	2019 PDC Players Championship 26 Barnsley, England	(Austria) Mensur Suljović	(England) Ian White	(England) Steve West (Wales) Jonny Clayton	(England) Andy Boulton (Scotland) Gary Anderson (Spain) Cristo Reyes (England) Ross Smith
26 September	2019 European Tour 13 – Host Nation Qualifier; Gibraltar, Gibraltar	Does not apply.			
27–29 September	2019 Gibraltar Darts Trophy Gibraltar, Gibraltar	(Poland) Krzysztof Ratajski	(England) Dave Chisnall	(England) Nathan Aspinall (Northern Ireland) Daryl Gurney	(Scotland) Peter Wright (England) James Wade (England) Ian White (Wales) Gerwyn Price
28 September	2019 PDC Challenge Tour 17 Wigan, England	(Republic of Ireland) Ciaran Teehan	(Netherlands) Berry van Peer	(Republic of Ireland) Shane McGuirk (Scotland) William Borland	(England) Eddie Lovely (England) Nick Fullwell (England) Patrick Lynskey (England) Kevin Dowling
28 September	2019 PDC Challenge Tour 18 Wigan, England	(England) Callan Rydz	(New Zealand) Cody Harris	(England) Aden Kirk (England) Matthew Dennant	(England) Andrew Gilding (England) Patrick Lynskey (Wales) Martin Thomas (Wales) Justin Smith
29 September	2019 PDC Challenge Tour 19 Wigan, England	(Northern Ireland) Kyle McKinstry	(Republic of Ireland) Jason Cullen	(England) Jack Main (England) Callan Rydz	(Netherlands) Erik Hol (England) Darren Johnson (England) Nick Fullwell (Wales) Martin Thomas
29 September	2019 PDC Challenge Tour 20 Wigan, England	(Scotland) Mark Barilli	(Republic of Ireland) Ciaran Teehan	(England) Nick Fullwell (England) David Evans	(Russia) Boris Koltsov (England) Callum Francis (Wales) John Davey (England) Andy Jenkins

== October ==
Date	Tournament	Champions	Runners-up	Semi-finalists	Quarter-finalists
4 October	2019 PDC Players Championship 27 Dublin, Republic of Ireland	(Wales) Gerwyn Price	(Poland) Krzysztof Ratajski	(Austria) Mensur Suljović (England) Ryan Joyce	(England) Scott Taylor (Wales) Robert Owen (Spain) Cristo Reyes (England) Nathan Aspinall
5 October	2019 PDC Players Championship 28 Dublin, Republic of Ireland	(Portugal) José de Sousa	(England) Glen Durrant	(Austria) Mensur Suljović (Wales) Gerwyn Price	(Netherlands) Jermaine Wattimena (Belgium) Kim Huybrechts (England) James Wade (England) Ian White
6–12 October	2019 World Grand Prix Dublin, Republic of Ireland	(Netherlands) Michael van Gerwen	(England) Dave Chisnall	(England) Chris Dobey (England) Glen Durrant	(England) Mervyn King (England) Ian White (Netherlands) Jermaine Wattimena (England) Nathan Aspinall
11 October	2019 DPA Pro Tour 27 Canberra, Australia	(Australia) Robbie King	(Australia) Damon Heta	(Australia) Mick Lacey (Australia) Peter Sutton	(Australia) Corey Naumann (Australia) Gordon Mathers (Australia) Stuart Coburn (Australia) Tim Pusey
12 October	2019 DPA Pro Tour 28 Canberra, Australia	(Australia) Gordon Mathers	(Australia) Mal Cuming	(Australia) Damon Heta (Australia) Rhys Mathewson	(Australia) John Bunyard (Australia) Brody Klinge (Australia) James Bailey (Australia) Robbie King
12 October	2019 DPA Pro Tour 29 Canberra, Australia	(Australia) Gordon Mathers	(Australia) Mal Cuming	(Australia) Damon Heta (Australia) James Bailey	(Australia) Steve MacArthur (Australia) Brody Klinge (Australia) Brendon McCausland (Australia) Tim Pusey
12 October	2019 PDC Nordic & Baltic Tour 7 Vääksy, Finland	(Lithuania) Darius Labanauskas	(Latvia) Madars Razma	(Sweden) Dennis Nilsson (Finland) Marko Kantele	(Denmark) Niels Heinsøe (Denmark) Rene Johansen (Finland) Teemu Harju (Denmark) Per Laursen
12 October	2020 European Tour 2 – Nordic & Baltic Qualifier; Vääksy, Finland	Does not apply.			
13 October	2019 DPA Pro Tour 30 Canberra, Australia	(Australia) Damon Heta	(Australia) James Bailey	(Australia) Gordon Mathers (Australia) Brendon McCausland	(Australia) Brandon Weening (Australia) Mal Cuming (Australia) Mick Lacey (Australia) Robbie King
13 October	2019 PDC Nordic & Baltic Tour 8 Vääksy, Finland	(Latvia) Madars Razma	(Lithuania) Darius Labanauskas	(Finland) Jari Keskinarkaus (Finland) Marko Kantele	(Denmark) Ivan Springborg (Finland) Ulf Ceder (Denmark) Niels Heinsøe (Sweden) Daniel Larsson
14 October	2019 PDC Players Championship 29 Barnsley, England	(Northern Ireland) Brendan Dolan	(England) Ian White	(Netherlands) Ron Meulenkamp (Scotland) Peter Wright	(England) Joe Cullen (England) Dave Chisnall (Wales) Gerwyn Price (Poland) Krzysztof Ratajski
15 October	2019 PDC Players Championship 30 Barnsley, England	(Scotland) Peter Wright	(Poland) Krzysztof Ratajski	(Netherlands) Danny Noppert (Wales) Gerwyn Price	(England) Andy Jenkins (England) Arron Monk (Wales) Jonny Clayton (Netherlands) Jermaine Wattimena
19–20 October	2019 Champions League of Darts Leicester, England	(Netherlands) Michael van Gerwen	(Scotland) Peter Wright	(Wales) Gerwyn Price (England) Michael Smith	(England) James Wade (Scotland) Gary Anderson (Northern Ireland) Daryl Gurney (England) Rob Cross
24–27 October	2019 European Championship Göttingen, Germany	(England) Rob Cross	(Wales) Gerwyn Price	(Northern Ireland) Daryl Gurney (England) Michael Smith	(England) Ricky Evans (England) Dave Chisnall (Netherlands) Jeffrey de Zwaan (Netherlands) Vincent van der Voort

== November ==
Date	Tournament	Champions	Runners-up	Semi-finalists	Quarter-finalists
1 November	2020 European Tour 3 – Nordic & Baltic Qualifier; Riga, Latvia	Does not apply.			
1–3 November	2019 World Series of Darts Finals Amsterdam, Netherlands	(Netherlands) Michael van Gerwen	(Netherlands) Danny Noppert	(Austria) Mensur Suljović (England) Dave Chisnall	(Wales) Jonny Clayton (Poland) Krzysztof Ratajski (England) Ian White (Netherlands) Raymond van Barneveld
2 November	2019 PDC Nordic & Baltic Tour 9 Riga, Latvia	(Latvia) Madars Razma	(Finland) Veijo Viinikka	(Denmark) Per Laursen (Finland) Marko Kantele	(Lithuania) Darius Labanauskas (Denmark) Niels Heinsøe (Latvia) Mickus Kristaps (Denmark) Ivan Springborg
2 November	2019 PDC Development Tour 17 Wigan, England	(England) Luke Humphries	(England) Ted Evetts	(Wales) Rhys Griffin (England) Ben Cheeseman	(Netherlands) Berry van Peer (England) Alex Jacques (Netherlands) Justin van Tergouw (Netherlands) Geert Nentjes
2 November	2019 PDC Development Tour 18 Wigan, England	(England) Ted Evetts	(Scotland) Greg Ritchie	(England) Ben Cheeseman (Netherlands) Mike van Duivenbode	(England) James Beeton (Scotland) William Borland (Netherlands) Kevin Doets (England) Dylan Powell
3 November	2019 PDC Nordic & Baltic Tour 10 Riga, Latvia	(Lithuania) Darius Labanauskas	(Denmark) Per Laursen	(Latvia) Madars Razma (Finland) Marko Kantele	(Finland) Asko Niskala (Denmark) Niels Heinsøe (Denmark) Ivan Springborg (Lithuania) Mindaugas Barauskas
3 November	2019 PDC Development Tour 19 Wigan, England	(England) Ted Evetts	(Republic of Ireland) Ciaran Teehan	(Austria) Rusty-Jake Rodriguez (Netherlands) Berry van Peer	(Germany) Christian Bunse (England) Tom Lonsdale (Netherlands) Owen Roelofs (Hungary) Patrik Kovács
3 November	2019 PDC Development Tour 20 Wigan, England	(England) Luke Humphries	(Netherlands) Geert Nentjes	(Germany) Martin Schindler (Netherlands) Kevin Doets	(England) Brad Phillips (Republic of Ireland) Keane Barry (England) Dan Read (Czech Republic) Adam Gawlas
4 & 24 November	2019 PDC World Youth Championship Wigan & Minehead, England	(England) Luke Humphries	(Czech Republic) Adam Gawlas	(England) Ryan Meikle (Republic of Ireland) Keane Barry	(England) Callan Rydz (Germany) Martin Schindler (Scotland) William Borland (Netherlands) Jeffrey de Zwaan
9–17 November	2019 Grand Slam of Darts Wolverhampton, England	(Wales) Gerwyn Price	(Scotland) Peter Wright	(Netherlands) Michael van Gerwen (England) Glen Durrant	(England) Adrian Lewis (Scotland) Gary Anderson (England) Dave Chisnall (England) Michael Smith
22–24 November	2019 Players Championship Finals Minehead, England	(Netherlands) Michael van Gerwen	(Wales) Gerwyn Price	(England) Chris Dobey (England) Ian White	(England) Stephen Bunting (Netherlands) Raymond van Barneveld (England) Mervyn King (Republic of Ireland) William O'Connor

== December ==
Date	Tournament	Champions	Runners-up	Semi-finalists	Quarter-finalists
13 December–1 January	2020 PDC World Darts Championship London, England	(Scotland) Peter Wright	(Netherlands) Michael van Gerwen	(England) Nathan Aspinall (Wales) Gerwyn Price	(Lithuania) Darius Labanauskas (Belgium) Dimitri Van den Bergh (England) Luke Humphries (England) Glen Durrant

== See also ==
- List of players with a 2019 PDC Tour Card
- 2019 PDC Pro Tour
