= 2019 World Series of Darts =

The 2019 World Series of Darts was a series of televised darts tournaments organised by the Professional Darts Corporation. In 2019, there were 5 World Series events and one finals event, which has this year been moved from Vienna, Austria to Amsterdam, Netherlands.

Two new venues made their debuts with Hamilton and Cologne replacing Auckland and Gelsenkirchen respectively.

== Prize money ==
=== International events ===
Stage	Prize money
Winner	£20,000
Runner-up	£10,000
Semi-finals	£5,000
Quarter-finals	£2,500
First round	£1,250

=== Finals ===
Stage	Prize money
Winner	£70,000
Runner-up	£30,000
Semi-finals	£20,000
Quarter-finals	£15,000
Second round	£7,500
First round	£5,000

== World Series events ==
No.	Date	Event	Venue	Champion	Legs	Runner-up	Ref
1	4–5 July	US Masters	(United States) Las Vegas, Mandalay Bay	Nathan Aspinall (England)	8 – 4	(England) Michael Smith	
2	12–13 July	German Masters	(Germany) Cologne, LANXESS arena	Peter Wright (Scotland)	8 – 6	(Germany) Gabriel Clemens	
3	9–10 August	Brisbane Masters	(Australia) Brisbane, BCEC	Damon Heta (Australia)	8 – 7	(England) Rob Cross	
4	16–17 August	Melbourne Masters	(Australia) Melbourne, Melbourne Arena	Michael van Gerwen (Netherlands)	8 – 3	(Northern Ireland) Daryl Gurney	
5	23–24 August	New Zealand Masters	(New Zealand) Hamilton, Claudelands Arena	Michael van Gerwen (Netherlands)	8 – 1	(Netherlands) Raymond van Barneveld	
6	1–3 November	World Series of Darts Finals	(Netherlands) Amsterdam, AFAS Live	Michael van Gerwen (Netherlands)	11 – 2	(Netherlands) Danny Noppert	

== World Series qualifiers ==
US Masters
- (Canada) Jeff Smith
- (United States) Leonard Gates
- (United States) Danny Baggish
- (United States) Elliot Milk
- (Canada) Shawn Brenneman
- (United States) Darin Young
- (Canada) Jim Long
- (Canada) Gary Mawson

German Masters
- (Germany) Max Hopp
- (Germany) Martin Schindler
- (Germany) Gabriel Clemens
- (Germany) Nico Kurz
- (Germany) Kevin Münch
- (Germany) Christian Bunse
- (Germany) Robert Marijanović
- (Germany) Maik Langendorf

Brisbane Masters
- (Australia) Kyle Anderson
- (Australia) Corey Cadby
- (Australia) Damon Heta
- (Australia) James Bailey
- (New Zealand) Haupai Puha
- (Australia) Koha Kokiri
- (Australia) Brendon McCausland
- (New Zealand) Ben Robb

Melbourne Masters
- (Australia) Kyle Anderson
- (Australia) Corey Cadby
- (Australia) Damon Heta
- (Australia) James Bailey
- (Australia) Robbie King
- (Australia) Tim Pusey
- (Australia) Mick Lacey
- (New Zealand) Haupai Puha

New Zealand Masters
- (Australia) Kyle Anderson
- (Australia) ~~Corey Cadby~~ (withdrew)
- (Australia) Damon Heta
- (New Zealand) Cody Harris
- (New Zealand) Haupai Puha
- (New Zealand) Craig Caldwell
- (New Zealand) Ben Robb
- (Australia) David Platt
- (New Zealand) Warren Parry

== 2019 World Series Order of Merit ==
The top eight will qualify for the World Series of Darts Finals and determine their seeding. The table only involves players with at least one win during the 2019 World Series tour.

Rank	Player	US Masters	German Masters	Brisbane Masters	Melbourne Masters	New Zealand Masters	Tour points	Appearances
1	(Netherlands) Michael van Gerwen	3	1	3	12	12	31	5
2	(Scotland) Peter Wright	5	12	1	5	3	26	5
3	(England) Rob Cross	3	3	8	5	5	24	5
4	(Northern Ireland) Daryl Gurney	3	3	5	8	3	22	5
5	(Australia) Damon Heta	-	-	12	3	1	16	3
6	(Netherlands) Raymond van Barneveld	-	1	3	3	8	15	4
7	(Scotland) Gary Anderson	3	1	3	3	3	13	5
8	(England) James Wade	-	5	1	1	5	12	4
9	(England) Nathan Aspinall	12	-	-	-	-	12	1
10	(Australia) Simon Whitlock	-	-	5	3	1	9	3
11	(England) Michael Smith	8	-	-	-	-	8	1
12	(Germany) Gabriel Clemens	-	8	-	-	-	8	1
13	(Wales) Gerwyn Price	5	-	-	-	-	5	1
14	(Austria) Mensur Suljović	-	5	-	-	-	5	1
15	(Australia) Kyle Anderson	-	-	3	1	1	5	3
16	(New Zealand) Ben Robb	-	-	1	-	3	4	2
17	(Germany) Martin Schindler	-	3	-	-	-	3	1
18	(Germany) Nico Kurz	-	3	-	-	-	3	1
