= 2019 World Series of Darts Finals =

2019 Jack's Casino World Series of Darts Finals

Tournament information
- Dates: 1–3 November 2019
- Venue: AFAS Live
- Location: Amsterdam
- Country: Netherlands
- Organisation(s): PDC
- Format: Legs
- Prize fund: £300,000
- Winner's share: £70,000
- High checkout: 161 Krzysztof Ratajski

Champion(s)
- (Netherlands) Michael van Gerwen

The 2019 Jack's Casino World Series of Darts Finals was the fifth staging of the World Series of Darts Finals tournament, organised by the Professional Darts Corporation. The tournament took place at the AFAS Live, Amsterdam, Netherlands, from 1–3 November 2019. It featured a field of 24 players.

James Wade was the defending champion after defeating Michael Smith 11–10 in the 2018 final. However, he lost 6–5 to Jonny Clayton in the second round; six seeds lost in total in the second round, the most in the tournament's history.

Michael van Gerwen won the tournament for the 4th time, his 15th World Series title in all, with an 11–2 win over Danny Noppert in the final.

== Prize money ==
The total prize money increased from £250,000 to £300,000.

Position (no. of players)		Prize money (Total: £300,000)
Winner	(1)	£70,000
Runner-up	(1)	£30,000
Semi-finalists	(2)	£20,000
Quarter-finalists	(4)	£15,000
Last 16 (second round)	(8)	£7,500
Last 24 (first round)	(8)	£5,000

== Qualification ==
The top eight players from the five World Series events of 2019 are seeded for this tournament. Those events are:

- 2019 US Darts Masters
- 2019 German Darts Masters
- 2019 Brisbane Darts Masters
- 2019 Melbourne Darts Masters
- 2019 New Zealand Darts Masters

In addition, the next four highest ranked players from the PDC Order of Merit following the 2019 World Grand Prix final on 12 October 2019 qualified. Eight further players were invited by the PDC, with four other players qualifying from the Tour Card Holder Qualifier in Barnsley on 16 October.

The following players qualified for the tournament:

World Series Top 8

1. (Netherlands) Michael van Gerwen (champion)
2. (Scotland) Peter Wright (second round)
3. (England) Rob Cross (second round)
4. (Northern Ireland) Daryl Gurney (second round)
5. (Australia) Damon Heta (second round)
6. (Netherlands) Raymond van Barneveld (quarter-finals)
7. (Scotland) Gary Anderson (second round)
8. (England) James Wade (second round)

PDC Order of Merit Qualifiers
- (England) Michael Smith (first round)
- (Wales) Gerwyn Price (second round)
- (Austria) Mensur Suljović (semi-finals)
- (England) Ian White (quarter-finals)

Tour Card Holder Qualifier
- (Wales) Jonny Clayton (quarter-finals)
- (Poland) Krzysztof Ratajski (quarter-finals)
- (England) Wayne Jones (first round)
- (England) Ricky Evans (first round)

Invited Players
- (England) Dave Chisnall (semi-finals)
- (England) Nathan Aspinall (first round)
- (Australia) Simon Whitlock (first round)
- (Netherlands) Jermaine Wattimena (second round)
- (Netherlands) Jeffrey de Zwaan (first round)
- (Netherlands) Danny Noppert (runner-up)
- (Australia) Kyle Anderson (first round)
- (Germany) Gabriel Clemens (first round)

== Draw ==
First round (best of 11 legs); 1 November
RQ	(England) Michael Smith 94.20	3
RQ	(Wales) Gerwyn Price 101.86	6
Q	(England) Wayne Jones 86.03	4
Q	(Wales) Jonny Clayton 87.10	6
(Australia) Kyle Anderson 83.80	1
RQ	(Austria) Mensur Suljović 86.88	6
Q	(Poland) Krzysztof Ratajski 104.19	6
(England) Nathan Aspinall 103.37	5
Q	(England) Ricky Evans 91.55	5
RQ	(England) Ian White 95.05	6
(Netherlands) Danny Noppert 93.66	6
(Netherlands) Jeffrey de Zwaan 84.54	3
(Netherlands) Jermaine Wattimena 96.43	6
(Germany) Gabriel Clemens 100.60	4
(England) Dave Chisnall 96.38	6
(Australia) Simon Whitlock 91.40	4

Second round (best of 11 legs); 2 November
1	(Netherlands) Michael van Gerwen 101.11	6
RQ	(Wales) Gerwyn Price 97.76	5
8	(England) James Wade 98.54	5
Q	(Wales) Jonny Clayton 93.81	6
5	(Australia) Damon Heta 90.76	3
RQ	(Austria) Mensur Suljović 89.64	6
4	(Northern Ireland) Daryl Gurney 97.92	4
Q	(Poland) Krzysztof Ratajski 92.81	6
2	(Scotland) Peter Wright 97.11	2
RQ	(England) Ian White 96.26	6
7	(Scotland) Gary Anderson 71.05	1
(Netherlands) Danny Noppert 90.97	6
6	(Netherlands) Raymond van Barneveld 101.70	6
(Netherlands) Jermaine Wattimena 89.80	4
3	(England) Rob Cross 94.15	4
(England) Dave Chisnall 94.99	6

Quarter-finals (best of 19 legs); 3 November
1	(Netherlands) Michael van Gerwen 104.02	10
Q	(Wales) Jonny Clayton 97.09	6
RQ	(Austria) Mensur Suljović 98.95	10
Q	(Poland) Krzysztof Ratajski 95.85	9
RQ	(England) Ian White 92.82	9
(Netherlands) Danny Noppert 89.43	10
6	(Netherlands) Raymond van Barneveld 97.86	8
(England) Dave Chisnall 95.77	10

Semi-finals (best of 21 legs); 3 November
1	(Netherlands) Michael van Gerwen 105.36	11
RQ	(Austria) Mensur Suljović 89.56	4
(Netherlands) Danny Noppert 94.19	11
(England) Dave Chisnall 99.26	10

Final (best of 21 legs); 3 November
1	(Netherlands) Michael van Gerwen 96.76	11
(Netherlands) Danny Noppert 89.37	2
