= Canterbury Open =

Darts tournament in New Zealand

Tournament information
- Venue: Cashmere Club
- Location: Christchurch
- Country: , New Zealand
- Established: 2009
- Organisation(s): NZDCO / WDF Silver graded
- Format: Legs

Current champion(s)
- Mal Cuming

The Canterbury Open is a darts tournament that has been held since 2009 in New Zealand. It is a silver graded event by the World Darts Federation.

== List of tournaments ==
Year	Champion	Score	Runner-up	Total Prize Money	Champion	Runner-up
1981	(Australia) George Foster	bt.	(New Zealand) Murray Smith	?	?	?
2009	(New Zealand) Warren French	5–2	(New Zealand) Bernie Smith	NZD 2,000	NZD 1,000	NZD 500
2010	(New Zealand) Tukina Weko	def.	(New Zealand) Bernie Smith	?	?	?
2011	(New Zealand) Jonathan Silcock	5–4	(New Zealand) Mike Day	NZD 2,000	NZD 1,000	NZD 500
2012	(New Zealand) Bernie Smith	5–3	(New Zealand) Tony Carmichael	?	?	?
2013	(New Zealand) Mike Day	5–4	(New Zealand) Tony Carmichael	NZD 2,000	NZD 1,000	NZD 500
2014	(New Zealand) Greg Moss	def.	(New Zealand) Tony Carmichael	?	?	?
2015	(New Zealand) Craig Caldwell	5–4	(New Zealand) Cody Harris			
2016	(New Zealand) Greg Moss	def.	(New Zealand) Bernie Smith			
2017	(New Zealand) Bernie Smith	def.	(New Zealand) Craig Caldwell			
2018	(New Zealand) Mark McGrath	def.	(New Zealand) Ben Robb			
2021	(New Zealand) Landon Gardiner	def.	(New Zealand) Craig Ross			
2022	(New Zealand) Haupai Puha	5–3	(New Zealand) Ben Robb			
2023	(New Zealand) Haupai Puha	5–4	(New Zealand) Warren Parry	NZD 3,550	NZD 1,500	NZD 750
2024	(Australia) Mal Cuming	5–2	(Australia) Michael Cassar	NZD 4,600	NZD 1,500	NZD 750

== Tournament records ==
- Most wins 2: (New Zealand) Haupai Puha
- Most Finals 3: (New Zealand) Bernie Smith, (New Zealand) Tony Carmichael.
- Most Semi Finals 3: (New Zealand) Bernie Smith, (New Zealand) Tony Carmichael, (New Zealand) Mike Day, (New Zealand) , Jason Ladbrook.
- Most Quarter Finals 5: (New Zealand) Bernie Smith.
- Most Appearances 6: (New Zealand) Mike Day, (New Zealand) , Jason Ladbrook .
- Most Prize Money won NZD$ 883: (New Zealand) Warren French
- Best winning average (.) : .
- Youngest Winner age 32: (New Zealand) Craig Caldwell.
- Oldest Winner age 32: (New Zealand) Craig Caldwell.

== See also ==
- List of BDO ranked tournaments
- List of WDF tournaments
