= Alan King Memorial =

Tournament information
- Venue: Otago Darts Association's headquarters
- Location: Dunedin
- Country: New Zealand
- Established: 1990
- Organisation(s): NZDC, WDF, category 3 BDO, category D
- Format: Legs
- Prize fund: NZD 4,000
- Month(s) Played: October

Current champion(s)
- (New Zealand) Haupai Puha (Men's) (New Zealand) Wendy Harper (Women's)

The Alan King Memorial is a darts tournament that has been held since 2005.

== List of winners ==
=== Men's ===
| Year | Champion | Score | Runner-up | Total Prize Money | Champion | Runner-up |
|---|---|---|---|---|---|---|
| 1990 | (New Zealand) Zac Taua | beat | (Australia) Rowan Barry | | | |
| 1991 | (New Zealand) Peter Hunt | beat | (New Zealand) Alan Bolton | | | |
| 1992 | (New Zealand) Zac Taua | beat | (New Zealand) Barry Whittaker | | | |
| 1993 | (New Zealand) Preston Ridd | beat | (Australia) Dave Anderson | | | |
| 1994 | (Australia) Marlon Johns | beat | (New Zealand) Murray Smith | | | |
| 1995 | (New Zealand) Herbie Nathan | beat | (Australia) Craig Stevens | | | |
| 1996 | (New Zealand) Peter Hunt | beat | (New Zealand) Murray Smith | | | |
| 1997 | (New Zealand) Peter Hunt | beat | (New Zealand) Murray Smith | | | |
| 1998 | (New Zealand) Peter Hunt | beat | (New Zealand) Herbie Nathan | | | |
| 1999 | (Australia) Tony David | 5–4 | (New Zealand) Warren Parry | | | |
| 2000 | (Australia) Tony David | 5–3 | (New Zealand) Warren Parry | | | |
| 2001 | (New Zealand) Robert Grant | beat | (New Zealand) Preston Ridd | | | |
| 2002 | (New Zealand) Robert Grant | beat | (New Zealand) Warren Parry | | | |
| 2003 | (Australia) Simon Whitlock | 5–1 | (New Zealand) Bernie Smith | | | |
| 2004 | (New Zealand) Robert Grant | 5–2 | (New Zealand) Preston Ridd | | | |
| 2005 | (New Zealand) Alan Bolton | 5–3 | (New Zealand) Steve Padget | | | |
| 2006 | (New Zealand) Dave Keating | 5–1 | (New Zealand) Warren Parry | | | |
| 2007 | (New Zealand) Barry Whittaker | 5–4 | (New Zealand) Jason Ladbrook | | | |
| 2008 | (New Zealand) Tony Carmichael | 5–4 | (New Zealand) Barry Whittaker | | | |
| 2009 | (New Zealand) Craig Ross | 5–3 | (New Zealand) Graeme Ryder | NZD 2,400 | NZD 1,000 | NZD 500 |
| 2010 | (New Zealand) Tony Carmichael | 5–1 | (New Zealand) Bernie Smith | | | |
| 2011 | (New Zealand) Tony Carmichael | 5–2 | (New Zealand) Jonathan Silcock | | | |
| 2012 | (New Zealand) Tony Carmichael | 5–3 | (New Zealand) Warren Parry | | | |
| 2013 | (New Zealand) Jason Ladbrook | 5–3 | (New Zealand) Warren Parry | | | |
| 2014 | (New Zealand) Warren Parry | 5–4 | (New Zealand) Steve Padget | | | |
| 2015 | (New Zealand) Craig Caldwell | 5–3 | (New Zealand) Tony Carmichael | | | |
| 2016 | (New Zealand) Mark McGrath | 5–4 | (New Zealand) Warren Parry | | | |
| 2017 | (New Zealand) Cody Harris | 6–1 | (New Zealand) Greg Moss | | | |
| 2018 | (New Zealand) Haupai Puha | 6–1 | (New Zealand) Steve Padget | NZD 2,400 | NZD 1,000 | NZD 500 |
| 2019 | (New Zealand) Darren Herewini | 6–4 | (New Zealand) Mike Day | NZD 2,400 | NZD 1,000 | NZD 500 |

=== Women's ===
| Year | Champion | Score | Runner-up | Total Prize Money | Champion | Runner-up |
|---|---|---|---|---|---|---|
| 2005 | (New Zealand) Mihi George | 5–2 | (New Zealand) Desi Mercer | | | |
| 2006 | (New Zealand) Valona Hereora | 5–4 | (New Zealand) Piki Morrison | | | |
| 2007 | (New Zealand) Rachel Padget | 5–1 | (New Zealand) Mihi George | | | |
| 2008 | (New Zealand) Val Henry | 5–4 | (New Zealand) Peggy Wikaira | | | |
| 2009 | (New Zealand) Rachel Paget | 5–0 | (New Zealand) Mihi George | NZD 2,400 | NZD 1,000 | NZD 500 |
| 2010 | (New Zealand) Rachel Paget | 5–2 | (New Zealand) Lorene Earnshaw | | | |
| 2011 | (New Zealand) Ripeka Te Meananui | 5–2 | (New Zealand) Rachel Padget | | | |
| 2012 | (New Zealand) Jane Harrington | 5–1 | (New Zealand) S'Vania Te Moananui | | | |
| 2013 | (New Zealand) Missi Jones | 4–2 | (New Zealand) Wendy Scoular | | | |
| 2014 | (New Zealand) Rosalie Ritchie | 5–2 | (New Zealand) Peggy Wikaira | | | |
| 2015 | (New Zealand) Jane Harrington | 5–1 | (New Zealand) Peggy Wikaira | | | |
| 2016 | (New Zealand) Desi Mercer | 5–3 | (New Zealand) Sha Hohipa | | | |
| 2017 | (New Zealand) Desi Mercer | 5–1 | (New Zealand) Tina Osborne | | | |
| 2018 | (New Zealand) Wendy Harper | 5–3 | (New Zealand) Judy Fenton | NZD 1,600 | NZD 600 | NZD 300 |
| 2019 | (New Zealand) Patience Te Moananui | 5–2 | (New Zealand) Vani Bakani | NZD 1,600 | NZD 600 | NZD 300 |
