= 2019 German Darts Masters =

Tournament information
- Dates: 12–13 July 2019
- Venue: LANXESS arena
- Location: Cologne
- Country: Germany
- Organisation(s): PDC
- Format: Legs
- Prize fund: £60,000
- Winner's share: £20,000
- High checkout: 170 (Germany) Nico Kurz

Champion(s)
- (Scotland) Peter Wright

The 2019 German Darts Masters was the third staging of the tournament by the Professional Darts Corporation, and was the second entry in the 2019 World Series of Darts. The tournament featured 16 players (eight PDC players facing eight regional qualifiers) and was held at the LANXESS arena in Cologne, Germany on 12–13 July 2019.

Mensur Suljović was the defending champion after defeating Dimitri Van den Bergh 8–2 in the 2018 final, but lost 8–3 to Gabriel Clemens in the semi-finals.

Peter Wright won his third World Series title and his second in Germany with an 8–6 win over Gabriel Clemens in the final.

Three of the top-ranked PDC players were beaten in the first round, a new record for the World Series.

== Prize money ==
The total prize fund was £60,000.

Position (no. of players)		Prize money (Total: £60,000)
Winner	(1)	£20,000
Runner-up	(1)	£10,000
Semi-finalists	(2)	£5,000
Quarter-finalists	(4)	£2,500
First round	(8)	£1,250

== Qualifiers ==
The eight invited PDC representatives are (with the top 4 seeded following the 2019 US Darts Masters):

1. (Scotland) Peter Wright (champion)
2. (Netherlands) Michael van Gerwen (first round)
3. (England) Rob Cross (quarter-finals)
4. (Northern Ireland) Daryl Gurney (quarter-finals)
5. (Scotland) Gary Anderson (first round)
6. (England) James Wade (semi-finals)
7. (Austria) Mensur Suljović (semi-finals)
8. (Netherlands) Raymond van Barneveld (first round)

The German qualifiers were:

Qualification	Player
#1 Ranked German Payer	(Germany) Max Hopp (first round)
#2 Ranked German Player	(Germany) Martin Schindler (quarter-finals)
#1 Ranked German Superleague Player	(Germany) Gabriel Clemens (runner-up)
#2 Ranked German Superleague Player	(Germany) Nico Kurz (quarter-finals)
#3 Ranked German Superleague Player	(Germany) Kevin Münch (first round)
#4 Ranked German Superleague Player	(Germany) Christian Bunse (first round)
#5 Ranked German Superleague Player	(Germany) Robert Marijanović (first round)
#6 Ranked German Superleague Player	(Germany) Maik Langendorf (first round)

== Draw ==
First round (best of 11 legs); 12 July
1	(Scotland) Peter Wright 96.69	6
(Germany) Robert Marijanović 88.10	4
(Scotland) Gary Anderson 92.80	4
(Germany) Nico Kurz 95.03	6
4	(Northern Ireland) Daryl Gurney 97.20	6
(Germany) Christian Bunse 92.82	2
(England) James Wade 90.90	6
(Germany) Kevin Münch 82.29	2
2	(Netherlands) Michael van Gerwen 91.75	5
(Germany) Martin Schindler 91.90	6
(Austria) Mensur Suljović 90.86	6
(Germany) Maik Langendorf 83.69	2
3	(England) Rob Cross 101.41	6
(Germany) Max Hopp 106.62	4
(Netherlands) Raymond van Barneveld 90.39	3
(Germany) Gabriel Clemens 98.48	6

Quarter-finals (best of 15 legs); 13 July
1	(Scotland) Peter Wright 97.29	8
(Germany) Nico Kurz 91.25	6
4	(Northern Ireland) Daryl Gurney 74.78	0
(England) James Wade 97.76	8
(Germany) Martin Schindler 91.05	2
(Austria) Mensur Suljović 100.89	8
3	(England) Rob Cross 105.86	5
(Germany) Gabriel Clemens 99.21	8

Semi-finals (best of 15 legs); 13 July
1	(Scotland) Peter Wright 96.30	8
(England) James Wade 90.27	4
(Austria) Mensur Suljović 91.59	3
(Germany) Gabriel Clemens 92.61	8

Final (best of 15 legs); 13 July
1	(Scotland) Peter Wright 93.27	8
(Germany) Gabriel Clemens 92.69	6
