= Alan Bolton (darts player) =

New Zealand darts player

Personal information
- Full name: Allan Bolton

Sport
- Sport: Darts
- Playing since: 1990
- Darts: 22g Eric Bristow Harrows Signature
- Laterality: Right-handed
- Walk-on music: "I Believe in a Thing Called Love" by The Darkness

Organisation (see split in darts)
- PDC: 2005–2011

PDC premier events – best performances
- World Championship: Last 68: 2008

Other tournament wins
- Tournament: Years
- Alan King Memorial New Zealand National Championships PDC World New Zealand Qualifying Event: 2005; 2007; 2007

Allan Bolton is a New Zealand former professional darts player.

== Darts career ==
Bolton won the 2005 Alan King Memorial Men's Singles Champions.

He won the 2007 New Zealand National Championships and won himself a place in the 2008 PDC World Darts Championship. He was beaten 5–0 in the preliminary round by Erwin Extercatte.

Bolton quit the PDC in 2011.

== World Championship results ==
=== PDC ===
- 2008: Last 68 (lost to Erwin Extercatte 0–5) (legs)
