= Damon Heta =

Australian darts player (born 1987)

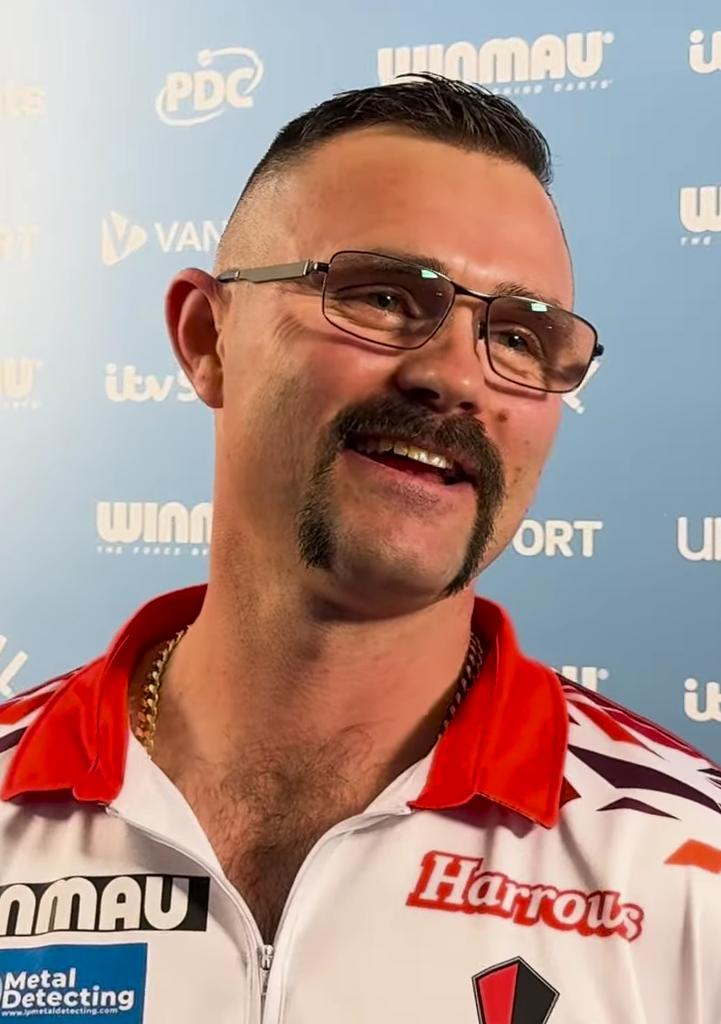
- Heta at the 2025 World Masters

Personal information
- Nickname: "The Heat"
- Born: 10 August 1987 (age 39) Perth, Australia
- Home town: Leicester, England

Sport
- Sport: Darts
- Playing since: 2007
- Darts: 23g Harrows Signature
- Laterality: Right-handed
- Walk-on music: "Dancing in the Dark" by Bruce Springsteen "Links Rechts" by Snollebollekes

Organisation (see split in darts)
- PDC: 2014–present (Tour Card: 2020–present)
- WDF: 2007–2019
- Current world ranking: (PDC) 21 (5 November 2026)

PDC premier events – best performances
- World Championship: Last 16: 2024
- World Matchplay: Quarter-final: 2023
- World Grand Prix: Last 32: 2021, 2022, 2023, 2024, 2025, 2026
- UK Open: Semi-final: 2024
- Grand Slam: Quarter-final: 2020, 2023
- European Championship: Last 16: 2021, 2026
- PC Finals: Quarter-final: 2020, 2023
- Masters: Quarter-final: 2024, 2025
- World Series Finals: Last 16: 2018, 2019, 2020, 2022, 2024, 2025

Other tournament wins
- Years
PDC World Cup of Darts (Team event)	2022
PDC Home Tour Event 3	2020
Australian Darts Open	2019
Australian Masters	2018, 2019
Pacific Masters	2011
West Coast Classic	2015
European Tour Events
Gibraltar Darts Trophy	2022
Players Championships (×9)
2020, 2022 (×2), 2023 (×2), 2024 (×2), 2025 (×2)
World Series of Darts
Brisbane Darts Masters	2019
DPA Pro Tours (×10)
2014, 2016, 2019 (x8)

Damon Heta (born 10 August 1987) is an Australian professional darts player who competes in Professional Darts Corporation (PDC) events, where he reached a peak ranking of world number six in 2024. Nicknamed "the Heat", he has been a PDC Tour Card holder since 2020. Heta won his first European Tour title at the 2022 Gibraltar Darts Trophy and reached his first major semi-final at the 2024 UK Open. He has won a total of 12 PDC titles in his professional career.

Prior to turning professional in 2020, Heta won his first overall PDC title at the 2019 Brisbane Darts Masters as a regional qualifier. He has since represented Australia in the PDC World Cup of Darts, winning the 2022 edition of the tournament alongside teammate Simon Whitlock.

== Career ==
=== Early career ===
Before turning professional in 2020, Heta mainly played on the Dartplayers Australia (DPA) Tour. His first big televised exposure in PDC darts was making his World Series debut at the 2014 Sydney Darts Masters as a DPA qualifier, where he was whitewashed 6–0 in the first round by Dave Chisnall. Heta qualified for the 2016 Auckland Darts Masters where he lost in the first round to Michael van Gerwen 6–3.

He qualified for the 2018 Melbourne Darts Masters, where he defeated his childhood friend Kyle Anderson 6–5 in the first round. He lost 10–7 to Gary Anderson in the quarter-finals. Anderson then defeated Heta 6–5 in the first round of the 2018 Brisbane Darts Masters a week later.

Amongst his titles won in Australia are the 2011 Pacific Masters, the 2014 DPA Australian Singles, the 2015 West Coast Classic, and the 2016 DPA Australian Open.

=== 2019: Brisbane Darts Master ===
On 3 August 2019, Heta won the inaugural Australian Darts Open, beating top British Darts Organisation players such as Jim Williams 8–1 in the semi-finals and 2015 BDO World Champion Scott Mitchell 10–9 in the final to take the $15,000 winner's prize.

A week later, at the 2019 Brisbane Darts Masters, Heta reached his first PDC final by beating former major winners James Wade, Gary Anderson and Simon Whitlock, becoming the first Australian player to reach a final on home soil. He won his maiden PDC title by defeating former world champion Rob Cross 8–7 in the final. Heta's win was considered a shock upset as he entered the tournament as a 250/1 betting outsider, having only won two televised matches before claiming his first title. After the victory, Heta discussed a potential move to the United Kingdom to play on the PDC Pro Tour, saying, "Hopefully I'll be able to come over to the UK soon and when I do people better watch out."

Heta beat James Wade once again in the first round of the 2019 Melbourne Darts Masters, but lost 8–3 to Rob Cross in the quarter-finals. He lost 6–1 to Peter Wright in the first round of the 2019 New Zealand Darts Masters.

=== 2020: Switch to professional ===
Heta secured his PDC World Championship debut at the 2020 edition through finishing top of the 2019 DPA Pro Tour Order of Merit. He won his first-round match against José de Sousa 3–0 in sets. This set up a tie with reigning BDO World Champion Glen Durrant in the second round, to whom Heta lost 3–0. Following the tournament, he attended 2020 PDC Q-School to pursue a career on the professional tour. He won a PDC Tour Card by finishing fourth on the UK Q-School Order of Merit.

Heta initially moved to England upon earning his Tour Card and competed in PDC events until he was advised to travel back home to Australia amidst the COVID-19 pandemic. He participated in the newly-established PDC Home Tour from his home in Perth. Despite the time difference involved, with Heta needing to wake up at 3 a.m. to play his opening group match, Heta won his group in the first edition of the Home Tour. He returned to Europe and won his first PDC ranking title in September; winning day two of the PDC Autumn Series in Niedernhausen, beating Joe Cullen 8–4 in the final. He also won Home Tour 3 by defeating Chris Dobey 4–2 in the final. Partnering Simon Whitlock, Heta made his PDC World Cup of Darts debut for Australia as a replacement for Kyle Anderson, with the pair reaching the quarter-finals.

Heta was awarded a place at the Grand Slam of Darts as the highest-ranked player on the PDC Autumn Series Order of Merit who had not already qualified. He finished second in Group F behind James Wade after wins over Jermaine Wattimena and Glen Durrant which saw him advance to the knockout rounds. He reached the quarter-finals before being eliminated in a 16–13 defeat to Wade. He also had a significant run at the Players Championship Finals by reaching a second major quarter-final, where he led Mervyn King 7–2 before eventually losing 10–8.

=== 2021–2022: World Cup champion ===
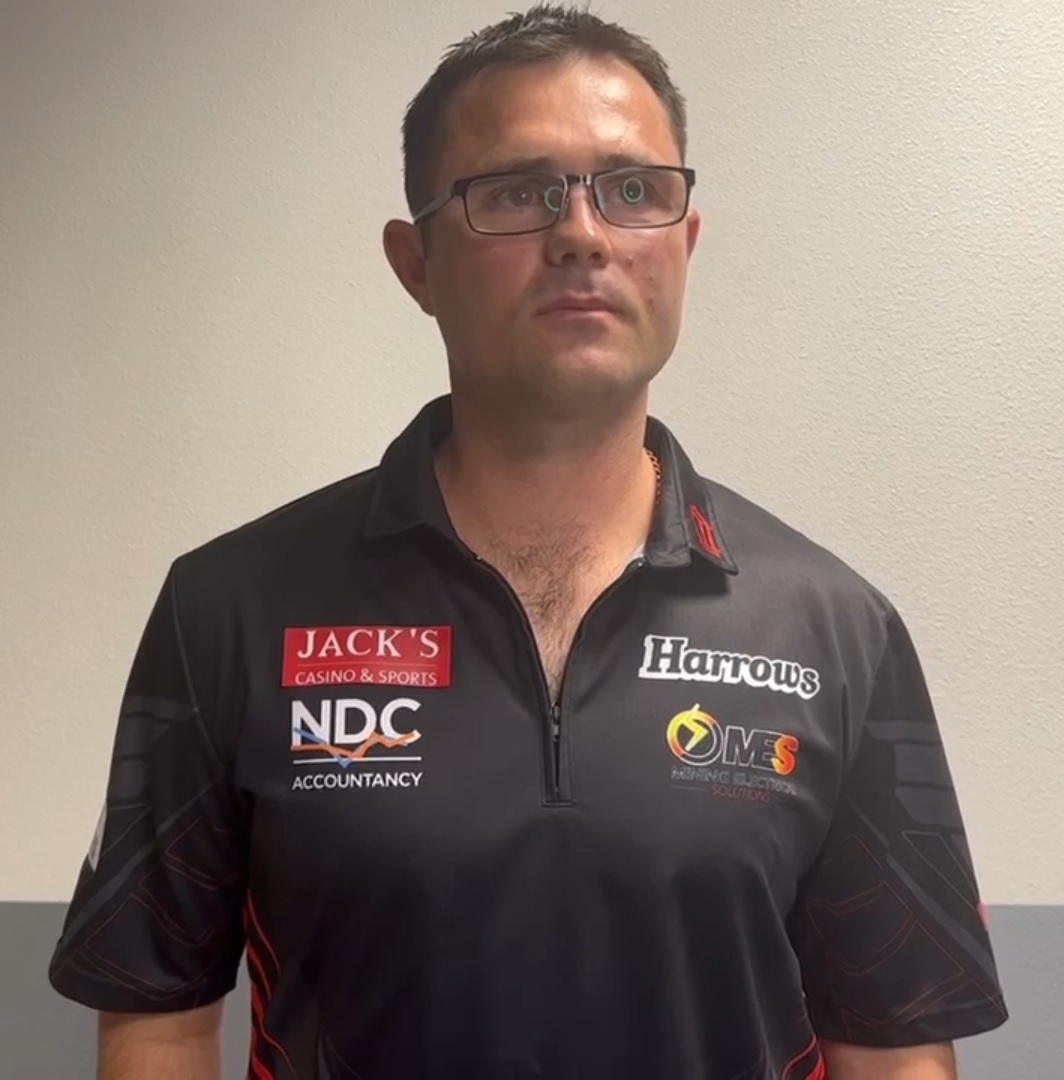
Heta in 2022

Heta made his second world championship appearance at the 2021 PDC World Championship, entering the first round as the highest-ranked non-seed on the Pro Tour Order of Merit. However, he suffered a surprise 3–2 defeat to American qualifier Danny Baggish, missing six match darts in the process. At the 2022 World Championship, Heta was the 31st seed and received a bye to the second round. He reached the third round of the competition for the first time after a 3–1 win over Luke Woodhouse. He took a 2–0 lead against 2020 champion Peter Wright, but was eliminated from the tournament after losing the next four sets in a 4–2 defeat.

Heta was a quarter-finalist at the 2022 UK Open, losing 10–5 to eventual champion Danny Noppert. He won 2022 Players Championship 5 by defeating Dimitri Van den Bergh 7–4 in the semi-finals and Gary Anderson 8–6 in the final. In June that year, Heta, in conjunction with Simon Whitlock, reached the final of the 2022 PDC World Cup of Darts after wins over Lithuania, Sweden, Belgium and England. They defeated Wales (Gerwyn Price and Jonny Clayton) 3–1 in the final to claim the title for Australia for the first time and become the fifth nation to win the event, ten years after the Australian team of Whitlock and Paul Nicholson lost the 2012 final to England. The duo dedicated their victory to compatriot and former professional player Kyle Anderson who died in August 2021, with Heta proclaiming, "This was for Kyle, and for Australia in general."

In October, Heta won the 2022 Gibraltar Darts Trophy on the PDC European Tour, securing his maiden European Tour title. He defeated Michael van Gerwen in the semi-finals and Peter Wright in the final, with both matches going to a deciding leg where Heta won 7–6 and 8–7. He won his second Players Championship title of the year at the 26th event, beating Dirk van Duijvenbode 8–4 in the final to claim his second PDC title in the space of six days.

=== 2023: World Matchplay quarter-final ===
Heta entered the second round of the 2023 World Championship as 20th seed and won his opening match, whitewashing two-time world champion Adrian Lewis 3–0. However, he faced a whitewash from Joe Cullen in the third round, losing 4–0 and exiting the tournament.

In their defence of the World Cup of Darts, Heta and Australia teammate Simon Whitlock reached the quarter-finals but were beaten by Belgium (Dimitri Van den Bergh and Kim Huybrechts) in a deciding leg. At the World Matchplay, Heta earned his first win at the event in his 10–5 victory over Josh Rock in the first round. He followed that with a dominant 11–1 win against Brendan Dolan to advance to the quarter-finals, where he was defeated 16–13 by Luke Humphries. Heta qualified for the Grand Slam of Darts through the Tour Card Holder Qualifier. He progressed to the knockout rounds by finishing second in Group H with 5–4 wins over Ricardo Pietreczko and Beau Greaves respectively and a 5–2 loss to Nathan Aspinall. In the second round, he produced a surprise 10–7 victory over Michael van Gerwen. He was eliminated by Rob Cross 16–6 in the quarter-finals. He reached another major quarter-final at the Players Championship Finals, where he lost 10–6 to Ryan Joyce.

Heta was a three-time ranking finalist in 2023. In the lead-up to the World Cup of Darts, he won Players Championship 14 by defeating Luke Woodhouse 8–2 in the final. The next month, in the lead-up to the World Matchplay, he claimed his second title of the year by beating Ryan Joyce 8–4 in the final of Players Championship 16. He reached a third final in October but missed out on the Players Championship 28 title in an 8–6 loss to Ross Smith. He was also runner-up at the New South Wales Darts Masters, but failed to capture a second World Series title as he lost 8–1 to Rob Cross.

=== 2024: First major semi-final ===
At the 2024 World Championship, Heta ensured his first appearance in the last 16 of the event following a 4–3 win over Berry van Peer in the third round. He was defeated 4–1 by Scott Williams.

Heta reached the semi-finals of a major event for the first time at the UK Open. He achieved wins over Simon Whitlock 10–8, Nathan Aspinall 10–9 and Gian van Veen 10–8 en route to the quarter-finals. He was drawn against 2024 World Championship runner-up Luke Littler. Their quarter-final match – noted for its high standard of play – saw Heta almost squander 8–4 and 9–6 leads as Littler fought back but Heta hit double 16 to win 10–8. He was drawn to play Dimitri Van den Bergh in the semi-finals, to whom he lost 11–6.

Heta won another two ranking titles during the year. He claimed his first title in February at Players Championship 4 with an 8–4 win over Chris Dobey in the final. He then won his second title in August by defeating Ryan Searle 8–3 in the final of Players Championship 18. Heta was also runner-up at the New Zealand Darts Masters, losing 8–2 to Luke Humphries in the final.

In October, Heta reached a career-high of sixth in the PDC World Rankings.

=== 2025: World Championship nine-darter ===
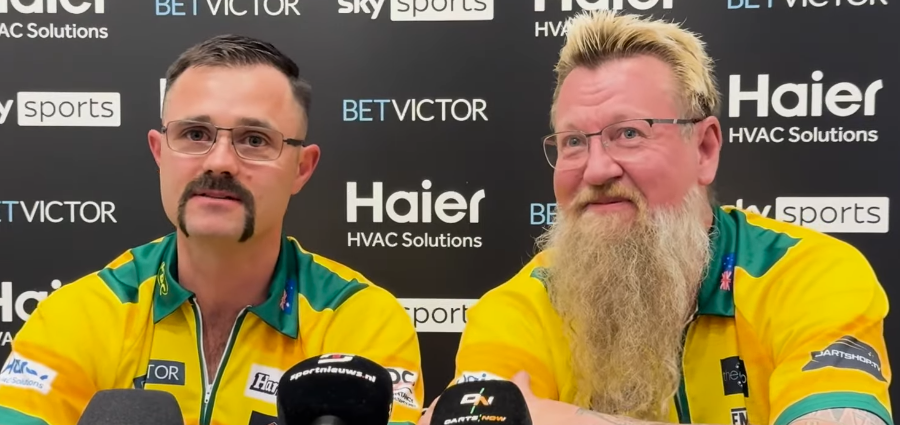
Heta (left) and Australian teammate Simon Whitlock at the 2025 PDC World Cup of Darts

At the 2025 World Championship, Heta lost the opening set of his second-round match against practice partner Connor Scutt but won the next three for a 3–1 victory, including an errant dart at double 12 which saw him miss out on a nine-dart finish. He then achieved the nine-darter in his third-round match with Luke Woodhouse, a contest Heta ultimately lost 4–3. Despite the defeat, Heta received a £60,000 bonus from tournament sponsor Paddy Power for hitting the nine-darter; he bought a Rolex watch upon the money entering his bank account.

In February, he reached the quarter-finals of the World Masters by dramatically beating Gerwyn Price 4–3 in sets, missing six match darts and surviving one match dart from Price before eventually securing the victory. He was eliminated after a 4–1 loss to Luke Humphries. Heta won his first title of 2025 at Players Championship 13 where he defeated Nathan Aspinall 8–6 in the final. At the European Darts Open, he made it to his first European Tour final since winning the 2022 Gibraltar Darts Trophy. He was unable to claim a second title, this time on the receiving end of an 8–6 loss to Aspinall. Heta won his second title of the year by beating Stephen Bunting 8–7 in the final of Players Championship 20. He was also a finalist at Players Championship 30, where he lost 8–3 to Wessel Nijman.

=== 2026 ===
Following victories over Steve Lennon and Stefan Bellmont, Heta was eliminated from the 2026 World Championship in the third round, losing 4–0 to Rob Cross. Heta reached the final of Players Championship 25 in July, where he was beaten 8–4 by Henry Coates.

== Personal life ==
Heta was born on 10 August 1987 in Perth, Western Australia. Through his father, he is of Māori descent. Heta worked as a roofer in Perth before moving to England with his wife Meaghan. They shared a house with fellow professional player Dimitri Van den Bergh in Leicester. Heta is a supporter of Premier League team Nottingham Forest.

In 2023, Heta grew a moustache in support of Movember.

== World Championship results ==
=== PDC World Championship ===
- 2020: Second round (lost to Glen Durrant 0–3)
- 2021: First round (lost to Danny Baggish 2–3)
- 2022: Third round (lost to Peter Wright 2–4)
- 2023: Third round (lost to Joe Cullen 0–4)
- 2024: Fourth round (lost to Scott Williams 1–4)
- 2025: Third round (lost to Luke Woodhouse 3–4)
- 2026: Third round (lost to Rob Cross 0–4)

== Career finals ==
=== PDC World Series finals: 3 (1 title) ===
Outcome	No.	Year	Championship	Opponent in the final	Score (Note: (l) = score in legs, (s) = score in sets, (m) = score in matches.)
Winner	1.	2019	Brisbane Masters	(England) Rob Cross	8–7 (l)
Runner-up	1.	2023	New South Wales Masters	(England) Rob Cross	1–8 (l)
Runner-up	2.	2024	New Zealand Masters	(England) Luke Humphries	2–8 (l)

=== PDC team finals: 1 (1 title) ===
Outcome	No.	Year	Championship	Country	Teammate	Opponents in the final	Score
Winner	1.	2022	World Cup	Australia	Simon Whitlock	Wales – Gerwyn Price and Jonny Clayton	3–1 (m)

== Performance timeline ==
Tournament	2018	2019	2020	2021	2022	2023	2024	2025	2026
PDC Ranked televised events
World Championship	DNQ		2R	1R	3R	3R	4R	3R	3R
World Masters	DNP		Did not quallify			1R	QF	QF	2R
UK Open	DNP		1R	3R	QF	4R	SF	6R	4R
World Matchplay	DNP		DNQ	1R	1R	QF	1R	1R	1R
World Grand Prix	DNP		DNQ	1R	1R	1R	1R	1R	1R
European Championship	DNP		DNQ	2R	1R	1R	1R	1R	2R
Grand Slam	DNP		QF	DNQ	RR	QF	DNQ	RR	DNQ
Players Championship Finals	DNP		QF	3R	1R	QF	3R	1R	
PDC Non-ranked televised events
World Cup	DNP		QF	QF	W	QF	2R	QF	RR
World Series Finals	2R	2R	2R	DNQ	2R	1R	2R	2R	1R
Career statistics
Season-end ranking	–	–	52	29	16	11	8	17	

=== PDC European Tour ===
Season	1	2	3	4	5	6	7	8	9	10	11	12	13	14	15
2020	BDC; 2R	GDC; DNQ	EDG; 1R	IDO; DNQ											
2021	HDT; 3R	GDT; 3R													
2022	IDO; 3R	GDC; 2R	GDG; SF	ADO; 2R	EDO; 2R	CDO; 2R	EDG; SF	DDC; 3R	EDM; QF	HDT; 2R	GDO; 3R	BDO; 2R	GDT; W		
2023	BSD; 3R	EDO; QF	IDO; QF	GDG; SF	ADO; 3R	DDC; SF	BDO; 3R	CDO; SF	EDG; SF	EDM; 2R	GDO; 2R	HDT; QF	GDC; QF		
2024	BDO; 3R	GDG; 2R	IDO; 3R	EDG; QF	ADO; 2R	BSD; 3R	DDC; 2R	EDO; SF	GDC; QF	FDT; 2R	HDT; 2R	SDT; 2R	CDO; 3R		
2025	BDO; 3R	EDT; 2R	IDO; 3R	GDG; 2R	ADO; QF	EDG; 2R	DDC; 3R	EDO; F	BSD; 2R	FDT; QF	CDO; 2R	HDT; 2R	SDT; 2R	GDC; 2R	
2026	PDO; 1R	EDT; SF	BDO; 2R	GDG; 2R	EDG; 2R	ADO; 2R	IDO; 3R	BSD; SF	SDO; 2R	EDO; SF	HDT; 1R	CDO; 2R	FDT; SF	SDT; 3R	DDC; QF

=== PDC Players Championships ===
Season	1	2	3	4	5	6	7	8	9	10	11	12	13	14	15	16	17	18	19	20	21	22	23	24	25	26	27	28	29	30	31	32	33	34
2020	BAR; 2R	BAR; 1R	WIG; 1R	WIG; 1R	WIG; 3R	WIG; 1R	BAR; 1R	BAR; 2R	MIL; Did not participate					NIE; 1R	NIE; W	NIE; QF	NIE; 3R	NIE; 1R	COV; QF	COV; 3R	COV; F	COV; QF	COV; 1R											
2021	BOL; 4R	BOL; 2R	BOL; 2R	BOL; F	MIL; 4R	MIL; 2R	MIL; 3R	MIL; 4R	NIE; 3R	NIE; 1R	NIE; QF	NIE; 3R	MIL; 1R	MIL; 3R	MIL; 4R	MIL; 1R	COV; 4R	COV; 3R	COV; 1R	COV; 1R	BAR; F	BAR; 4R	BAR; 1R	BAR; 1R	BAR; 1R	BAR; 2R	BAR; QF	BAR; 1R	BAR; SF	BAR; 4R				
2022	BAR; 2R	BAR; SF	WIG; F	WIG; 1R	BAR; W	BAR; 3R	NIE; 4R	NIE; 4R	BAR; 2R	BAR; SF	BAR; 1R	BAR; SF	BAR; 3R	WIG; SF	WIG; QF	NIE; 4R	NIE; 4R	BAR; 3R	BAR; 3R	BAR; 4R	BAR; SF	BAR; DNP			BAR; SF	BAR; W	BAR; 1R	BAR; SF	BAR; 4R	BAR; 3R				
2023	BAR; 3R	BAR; 1R	BAR; 1R	BAR; 3R	BAR; 2R	BAR; 1R	HIL; 3R	HIL; 3R	WIG; 2R	WIG; QF	LEI; 3R	LEI; SF	HIL; SF	HIL; W	LEI; 4R	LEI; W	HIL; 2R	HIL; 2R	BAR; 2R	BAR; 3R	BAR; 1R	BAR; SF	BAR; 3R	BAR; QF	BAR; 1R	BAR; 2R	BAR; 3R	BAR; F	BAR; SF	BAR; SF				
2024	WIG; 1R	WIG; 2R	LEI; 4R	LEI; W	HIL; 3R	HIL; 4R	LEI; 4R	LEI; 2R	HIL; 3R	HIL; 1R	HIL; 4R	HIL; 2R	MIL; 1R	MIL; QF	MIL; SF	MIL; 3R	MIL; 2R	MIL; W	MIL; 2R	WIG; 4R	WIG; QF	MIL; 3R	MIL; QF	WIG; 2R	WIG; 4R	WIG; 4R	WIG; QF	WIG; 1R	LEI; QF	LEI; QF				
2025	WIG; 4R	WIG; 4R	ROS; 3R	ROS; 2R	LEI; QF	LEI; QF	HIL; 3R	HIL; 3R	LEI; 4R	LEI; 3R	LEI; QF	LEI; 1R	ROS; W	ROS; 3R	HIL; 1R	HIL; 1R	LEI; SF	LEI; 4R	LEI; QF	LEI; W	LEI; 4R	HIL; DNP		MIL; 2R	MIL; 1R	HIL; 4R	HIL; 1R	LEI; 1R	LEI; 3R	LEI; F	WIG; 4R	WIG; 4R	WIG; 4R	WIG; 1R
2026	HIL; 1R	HIL; 1R	WIG; 2R	WIG; 3R	LEI; 3R	LEI; 1R	LEI; 2R	LEI; 3R	WIG; 2R	WIG; 1R	MIL; 3R	MIL; 2R	HIL; 1R	HIL; 3R	LEI; 1R	LEI; 4R	LEI; 4R	LEI; 1R	MIL; 1R	MIL; 1R	WIG; 3R	WIG; 2R	LEI; 3R	LEI; 3R	HIL; F	HIL; QF	LEI; DNP		ROS; 1R	ROS; 3R	ROS; 1R	ROS; 2R	LEI; 1R	LEI; 2R

Performance Table Legend
W	Won the tournament	F	Finalist	SF	Semifinalist	QF	Quarterfinalist	#R; RR; Prel.	Lost in # round Round-robin; Preliminary round	DQ	Disqualified
DNQ	Did not qualify	DNP	Did not participate	WD	Withdrew	NH	Tournament not held	#R; RR; Prel.	Lost in # round Round-robin; Preliminary round	NYF	Not yet founded

== Nine-dart finishes ==
Damon Heta's televised nine-dart finishes
Date	Opponent	Tournament	Method	Prize
27 December 2024	Luke Woodhouse	PDC World Championship	3 x T20; 3 x T20; T20, T19, D12	£60,000
