= Haupai Puha =

New Zealand darts player (born 1985)

Personal information
- Nickname: "Hopes"
- Born: 12 February 1985 (age 41) Gisborne, New Zealand
- Home town: Wellington, New Zealand

Sport
- Sport: Darts
- Playing since: 2017
- Darts: 24g Shot Signature
- Laterality: Right-handed
- Walk-on music: "35" by Ka Hao ft. Rob Ruha

Organisation (see split in darts)
- PDC: 2017–2025 (Tour Card: 2024–2025)
- WDF: 2021–2023

WDF major events – best performances
- World Championship: Last 48: 2022

PDC premier events – best performances
- World Championship: Last 96: 2021, 2024
- UK Open: Last 64: 2025
- World Series Finals: Last 16: 2023

Other tournament wins
- Years
Alan King Memorial	2018
Canterbury Classic	2023
Canterbury Open	2022, 2023
DPA Oceanic Masters	2023
New Zealand Masters	2022
New Zealand Open	2021, 2023
PDC Affiliate tours
DPA Pro Tour	2019 (×3)
DPNZ Pro Tour	2022 (×1); 2023 (×2); 2024 (×2); 2025 (×1)
Medal record
Men's Darts
Representing New Zealand
WDF World Cup
Gold medal – first place	2023 Esbjerg	Men's pairs

Haupai Puha (born 12 February 1985) is a New Zealand professional darts player who competes in Professional Darts Corporation (PDC) events. Nicknamed "Hopes", Puha is the first player from New Zealand to have won a PDC Tour Card, having won one in 2024.

He has won titles on both the affiliated Darts Players Australia and Darts Players New Zealand tours, and has represented New Zealand at both the PDC World Cup of Darts and the WDF World Cup.

== Early and personal life ==
Born on 12 February 1985 in Gisborne, Puha is Māori, of Ngāti Porou. He grew up in Wellington and started playing golf at age 15, going on to play for Wellington's men's team and winning the New Zealand Māori Golf Match Play Championship in 2010 and 2012. He started playing darts in 2015 and has credited his experience with golf in making the transition to darts.

Prior to going professional as a darts player, Puha worked as a roofer. He and his wife Kawhena have three children.

== Darts career ==
In 2018, Puha qualified for two World Series events as the number two ranked player in the DPNZ rankings. He would lose in the first round of both events; to Kyle Anderson in Auckland and to Rob Cross in Melbourne.

In 2019, he made his first appearance at the World Cup of Darts, partnering Cody Harris. They beat Lithuania and South Africa to reach the quarter-finals, eventually losing to Japan.

Puha also qualified for all three World Series events in Australia and New Zealand in 2019. He lost to Raymond van Barneveld in the first round of both the Brisbane Masters and the Melbourne Masters, and to Gary Anderson in the first round of the New Zealand Masters.

Puha has played once in the WDF World Championship and twice in the PDC World Championship, losing in the first round on all three occasions.

Having won his PDC Tour Card in January 2024, Puha competed at the 2024 UK Open. He beat Jelle Klaasen in the first round before losing to Wesley Plaisier in the second round. On 8 May 2024, Puha qualified for a European Tour event for the first time. He lost to Niels Zonneveld in the opening round of the 2024 Dutch Darts Championship.

== World Championship results ==
=== PDC ===
- 2021: First round (lost to Mickey Mansell 0–3) (sets)
- 2024: First round (lost to Martin Lukeman 1–3)
- 2026: First round (lost to Niels Zonneveld 0–3)

=== WDF ===
- 2022: First round (lost to Ben Hazel 1–2)

== Performance timeline ==
Puha's performance timeline is as follows:

=== WDF ===
Tournament	2022	2023
WDF Ranked televised events
World Championship	1R	PDC
Australian Open	F	QF

=== PDC ===
Tournament	2019	2020	2021	2022	2023	2024	2025	2026
PDC Ranked televised events
World Championship	DNQ		1R	DNQ		1R	DNQ	1R
World Masters	Did not qualify						Prel.	
UK Open	Did not qualify					2R	4R	
PDC Non-ranked televised events
World Series Finals	DNQ			1R	2R	1R	1R	
World Cup	1R	1R	DNQ			RR	RR	
Career statistics
Season-end ranking (PDC)	NR	125	NR		149	133	89	

==== European Tour ====
Tournament	2024
Baltic Sea Open	1R
Dutch Championship	1R

==== Players Championships ====
Season	1	2	3	4	5	6	7	8	9	10	11	12	13	14	15	16	17	18	19	20	21	22	23	24	25	26	27	28	29	30	31	32	33	34
2024	WIG; 1R	WIG; 1R	LEI; 1R	LEI; 3R	HIL; 1R	HIL; 1R	LEI; 1R	LEI; 1R	HIL; 2R	HIL; 1R	HIL; 1R	HIL; 4R	MIL; 1R	MIL; 2R	MIL; Did not participate					WIG; 3R	WIG; 3R	LEI; 1R	LEI; 1R	Did not participate										
2025	WIG; 2R	WIG; 3R	ROS; 1R	ROS; 1R	LEI; 1R	LEI; 2R	HIL; 1R	HIL; 1R	LEI; 4R	LEI; 2R	LEI; 1R	LEI; 2R	ROS; 1R	ROS; 2R	HIL; DNP		LEI; 1R	LEI; 1R	LEI; 2R	LEI; 3R	LEI; 1R	HIL; 1R	HIL; 1R	MIL; DNP		HIL; 1R	HIL; 2R	LEI; 2R	LEI; 2R	LEI; 1R	WIG; 1R	WIG; 1R	WIG; 1R	WIG; 1R

==== World Series of Darts ====
Tournament	2018	2019	2022	2023	2024	2025
Auckland Masters	1R	Not held				
Melbourne Masters	1R	1R	Not held			
Brisbane Masters	DNP	1R	Not held			
New Zealand Masters	NH	1R	DNP	QF	1R	1R
Queensland Masters	NH		QF	NH		
New South Wales Masters	NH		1R	DNP	NH	
Australian Masters	Not held				1R	1R

Performance Table Legend
W	Won the tournament	F	Finalist	SF	Semifinalist	QF	Quarterfinalist	#R; RR; Prel.	Lost in # round Round-robin; Preliminary round	DQ	Disqualified
DNQ	Did not qualify	DNP	Did not participate	WD	Withdrew	NH	Tournament not held	#R; RR; Prel.	Lost in # round Round-robin; Preliminary round	NYF	Not yet founded
