= 2019 Melbourne Darts Masters =

Tournament information
- Dates: 16–17 August 2019
- Venue: Melbourne Arena
- Location: Melbourne
- Country: Australia
- Organisation(s): PDC
- Format: Legs
- Prize fund: £60,000
- Winner's share: £20,000
- High checkout: 161 (England) Rob Cross

Champion(s)
- (Netherlands) Michael van Gerwen

The 2019 Melbourne Darts Masters was the third staging of the tournament by the Professional Darts Corporation, and was the fourth entry in the 2019 World Series of Darts. The tournament featured 16 players (eight PDC players facing eight regional qualifiers) and was held at the Melbourne Arena in Melbourne, Australia from 16 to 17 August 2019.

Peter Wright was the defending champion after defeating Michael Smith 11–8 in the 2018 final, but lost 8–0 to Michael van Gerwen in the semi-finals.

Van Gerwen would go on to win his first Melbourne title by defeating Daryl Gurney 8–3 in the final.

== Prize money ==
The total prize fund was £60,000.

Position (no. of players)		Prize money (Total: £60,000)
Winner	(1)	£20,000
Runner-up	(1)	£10,000
Semi-finalists	(2)	£5,000
Quarter-finalists	(4)	£2,500
First round	(8)	£1,250

== Qualifiers ==
The eight invited PDC representatives, (seeded according to the World Series Order of Merit) are:

1. (Scotland) Peter Wright (semi-finals)
2. (England) Rob Cross (semi-finals)
3. (Northern Ireland) Daryl Gurney (runner-up)
4. (Netherlands) Michael van Gerwen (champion)
5. (Scotland) Gary Anderson (quarter-finals)
6. (England) James Wade (first round)
7. (Australia) Simon Whitlock (quarter-finals)
8. (Netherlands) Raymond van Barneveld (quarter-finals)

The regional qualifiers are:

Qualification	Player
PDC Tour Card Holders	(Australia) Kyle Anderson (first round)
PDC Tour Card Holders	(Australia) Corey Cadby (first round)
DPA Order of Merit #1	(Australia) Damon Heta (quarter-finals)
DPA Order of Merit #2	(Australia) James Bailey (first round)
DPA Qualifiers	(Australia) Robbie King (first round)
DPA Qualifiers	(Australia) Tim Pusey (first round)
DPA Qualifiers	(Australia) Mick Lacey (first round)
DPNZ Qualifier	(New Zealand) Haupai Puha (first round)

== Draw ==
First round best of 11 legs 16 August
1	(Scotland) Peter Wright 82.24	6
(Australia) Corey Cadby 83.80	4
(Netherlands) Raymond van Barneveld 106.13	6
(New Zealand) Haupai Puha 93.13	1
4	(Netherlands) Michael van Gerwen 93.24	6
(Australia) Tim Pusey 83.49	2
(Scotland) Gary Anderson 96.97	6
(Australia) James Bailey 79.34	0
2	(England) Rob Cross 86.28	6
(Australia) Robbie King 77.13	2
(England) James Wade 93.25	1
(Australia) Damon Heta 99.60	6
3	(Northern Ireland) Daryl Gurney 97.57	6
(Australia) Kyle Anderson 93.35	3
(Australia) Simon Whitlock 97.62	6
(Australia) Mick Lacey 78.93	3

Quarter-finals best of 15 legs 17 August
1	(Scotland) Peter Wright 94.91	8
(Netherlands) Raymond van Barneveld 94.40	6
4	(Netherlands) Michael van Gerwen 100.63	8
(Scotland) Gary Anderson 95.08	6
2	(England) Rob Cross 102.86	8
(Australia) Damon Heta 87.20	3
3	(Northern Ireland) Daryl Gurney 94.74	8
(Australia) Simon Whitlock 92.44	4

Semi-finals best of 15 legs 17 August
1	(Scotland) Peter Wright 82.61	0
4	(Netherlands) Michael van Gerwen 96.97	8
2	(England) Rob Cross 96.25	5
3	(Northern Ireland) Daryl Gurney 98.15	8

Final best of 15 legs 17 August
4	(Netherlands) Michael van Gerwen 99.00	8
3	(Northern Ireland) Daryl Gurney 100.60	3
