= 2019 Brisbane Darts Masters =

2019 Brisbane Darts Masters, in association with Pirate Life

Tournament information
- Dates: 9–10 August 2019
- Venue: BCEC
- Location: Brisbane
- Country: Australia
- Organisation(s): PDC
- Format: Legs
- Prize fund: £60,000
- Winner's share: £20,000
- High checkout: 170 (England) Rob Cross

Champion(s)
- (Australia) Damon Heta

The 2019 Brisbane Darts Masters, in association with Pirate Life was the second staging of the tournament by the Professional Darts Corporation, as the third entry in the 2019 World Series of Darts. The tournament featured 16 players (eight PDC players facing eight regional qualifiers) and was held at the BCEC in Brisbane, Australia from 9–10 August 2019.

Rob Cross was the defending champion, after defeating Michael van Gerwen 11–6 in the 2018 final, but lost to Damon Heta 8–7 in the final.

Damon Heta won his first televised title after defeating the defending champion Rob Cross 8–7 in the final on his birthday. Heta only become the second regional qualifier to win a World Series event after compatriot and best friend Kyle Anderson won the 2017 Auckland Darts Masters. He also became both the first ever host nation player and the first ever non-Tour Card holder to win a World Series event.

== Prize money ==
The total prize fund was £60,000.

Position (no. of players)		Prize money (Total: £60,000)
Winner	(1)	£20,000
Runner-up	(1)	£10,000
Semi-finalists	(2)	£5,000
Quarter-finalists	(4)	£2,500
First round	(8)	£1,250

== Qualifiers ==
The eight invited PDC representatives, (seeded according to the World Series Order of Merit) were:

1. (Scotland) Peter Wright (first round)
2. (England) Rob Cross (runner-up)
3. (Northern Ireland) Daryl Gurney (semi-finals)
4. (England) James Wade (first round)
5. (Netherlands) Michael van Gerwen (quarter-finals)
6. (Scotland) Gary Anderson (quarter-finals)
7. (Australia) Simon Whitlock (semi-finals)
8. (Netherlands) Raymond van Barneveld (quarter-finals)

The regional qualifiers were:

Qualification	Player
PDC Tour Card Holders	(Australia) Kyle Anderson (quarter-finals)
PDC Tour Card Holders	(Australia) Corey Cadby (first round)
DPA Order of Merit #1	(Australia) Damon Heta (champion)
DPA Order of Merit #2	(Australia) James Bailey (first round)
DPA Qualifiers	(Australia) Haupai Puha (first round)
DPA Qualifiers	(Australia) Koha Kokiri (first round)
DPA Qualifiers	(Australia) Brendon McCausland (first round)
DPNZ Qualifier	(New Zealand) Ben Robb (first round)

== Draw ==
First round (best of 11 legs); 9 August
1	(Scotland) Peter Wright 90.84	5
(Australia) Kyle Anderson 86.03	6
(Australia) Simon Whitlock 87.58	6
(Australia) Brendon McCausland 74.87	1
4	(England) James Wade 91.63	5
(Australia) Damon Heta 86.98	6
(Scotland) Gary Anderson 101.68	6
(Australia) Corey Cadby 87.15	1
2	(England) Rob Cross 101.17	6
(Australia) James Bailey 87.50	5
(Netherlands) Raymond van Barneveld 90.16	6
(New Zealand) Haupai Puha 84.99	2
3	(Northern Ireland) Daryl Gurney 95.07	6
(New Zealand) Koha Kokiri 86.96	4
(Netherlands) Michael van Gerwen 94.93	6
(New Zealand) Ben Robb 79.29	0

Quarter-finals (best of 15 legs); 10 August
(Australia) Kyle Anderson 78.42	0
(Australia) Simon Whitlock 101.90	8
(Australia) Damon Heta 92.52	8
(Scotland) Gary Anderson 91.86	6
2	(England) Rob Cross 95.73	8
(Netherlands) Raymond van Barneveld 96.71	4
3	(Northern Ireland) Daryl Gurney 95.53	8
(Netherlands) Michael van Gerwen 98.03	5

Semi-finals (best of 15 legs); 10 August
(Australia) Simon Whitlock 91.04	6
(Australia) Damon Heta 90.49	8
2	(England) Rob Cross 106.53	8
3	(Northern Ireland) Daryl Gurney 96.77	3

Final (best of 15 legs); 10 August
(Australia) Damon Heta 95.86	8
2	(England) Rob Cross 97.92	7
