= Robbie King (darts player) =

Australian darts player (born 1993)

Personal information
- Nickname: "The Rocket"
- Born: 29 October 1993 (age 32) Gold Coast, Queensland, Australia

Sport
- Sport: Darts
- Playing since: 2010
- Darts: Puma Darts Legend 25g
- Laterality: Right-handed
- Walk-on music: "Midnight Blue" by Lou Gramm

Organisation (see split in darts)
- PDC: 2016–

PDC premier events – best performances
- World Championship: Last 96: 2020

Other tournament wins
- Years
ADA Tour	2025
Dosh Balcatta AGP	2015
DPA Australian Pro Tour	2019 (x3), 2020
DPA Queensland Bubble	2021 (x2)
Victoria Easter Classic	2015

Robbie King (born 29 October 1993) is an Australian professional darts player who plays in Professional Darts Corporation (PDC) events.

== Career ==
King was born in Gold Coast, Queensland, and made his television debut at the 2019 Melbourne Darts Masters. However, he lost 6–2 to Rob Cross in the first round.

== World Championship results ==
=== PDC ===
- 2020: First round (lost to Ryan Searle 2–3)

== Performance timeline ==
PDC

Tournament	2020
PDC World Championship	1R

Performance timeline legend
DNP	Did not play in the event	#R	lost in the early rounds of the tournament (RR = Round robin)	QF	lost in the quarter-finals
SF	lost in the semi-finals	F	lost in the final	W	won the tournament
