= Ben Robb =

New Zealand darts player

Personal information
- Nickname: "Big Rig"
- Born: Rangiora, New Zealand
- Home town: Auckland, New Zealand

Sport
- Sport: Darts
- Playing since: 2008
- Darts: 25g One80 Signature
- Laterality: Right-handed
- Walk-on music: "Dangerous" by Royal Deluxe "Bliss" by Th’ Dudes

Organisation (see split in darts)
- BDO: 2018–2019
- PDC: 2019–
- WDF: 2018–
- Current world ranking: (WDF) 12 (17 August 2026)

WDF major events – best performances
- World Championship: Quarter-final: 2025
- World Masters: Last 32: 2024

PDC premier events – best performances
- World Championship: Last 96: 2020, 2022, 2023, 2024, 2025
- World Series Finals: Last 32: 2026

Other tournament wins
- Years
Alan King Memorial	2023
John Wilkie Memorial	2021, 2024
New Zealand Masters	2023
New Zealand Open	2022, 2024
North Island Masters	2021
South Island Masters	2019, 2021, 2022, 2023
Taranaki Open	2022
Ted Clements Memorial	2022
ADA Pro Tour
2025
DPA Pro Tour
2019 (×2); 2020 (×1)
DPNZ Pro Tour
2019 (×2); 2020 (×1); 2022 (×5); 2023 (×7); 2024 (×3); 2025 (×2)
Medal record
Men's Darts
Representing New Zealand
WDF World Cup
Gold medal – first place	2023 Esbjerg	Men's pairs
WDF Asia-Pacific Cup
Silver medal – second place	2018 Seoul	Men's singles
Silver medal – second place	2018 Seoul	Men's pairs
Bronze medal – third place	2018 Seoul	Team event

Ben Robb is a New Zealand professional darts player who competes in Professional Darts Corporation (PDC) and World Darts Federation (WDF) events.

== Career ==
Robb made his television debut in the 2018 Auckland Darts Masters, but lost to Simon Whitlock.

Robb subsequently competed in the 2019 Brisbane Darts Masters, losing in the first round to Michael van Gerwen 6–0.

In the 2019 New Zealand Darts Masters, he beat Whitlock 6–4 before losing to Rob Cross in the quarter-finals. In January 2022 Robb participated in the PDC Qualifying School without success.

== World Championship results ==
=== PDC ===
- 2020: First round (lost to Ron Meulenkamp 0–3)
- 2022: First round (lost to Rusty-Jake Rodriguez 1–3)
- 2023: First round (lost to Mickey Mansell 1–3)
- 2024: First round (lost to Richard Veenstra 0–3)
- 2025: First round (lost to Connor Scutt 0–3)

=== WDF ===
- 2025: Quarter-finals (lost to Jenson Walker 2–4)

== Performance timeline ==
=== WDF ===
Tournament	2024	2025
WDF Major/platinum events
World Championship	PDC	QF
World Masters	4R	DNP

=== PDC ===
Tournament	2020	2022	2023	2024	2025	2026
PDC Ranked televised events
World Championship	1R	1R	1R	1R	1R	DNQ
PDC Non-ranked televised events
World Cup	DNQ	2R	RR	RR	DNP	RR
World Series Finals	Did not qualify					1R

=== Australian Darts Association Tour ===
Season	1	2	3	4	5	6	7	8	9	10	11	12
2025	L16	QF	F	L16	F	SF	SF	QF	W	L16	L32	L16
