= 2019 New Zealand Darts Masters =

2019 New Zealand Darts Masters, presented by Burger King & TAB

Tournament information
- Dates: 23–24 August 2019
- Venue: Claudelands Arena
- Location: Hamilton
- Country: New Zealand
- Organisation(s): PDC
- Format: Legs
- Prize fund: £60,000
- Winner's share: £20,000
- High checkout: 164 (Netherlands) Michael van Gerwen

Champion(s)
- (Netherlands) Michael van Gerwen

The 2019 New Zealand Darts Masters, presented by Burger King & TAB was the inaugural staging of the tournament by the Professional Darts Corporation, and was the fifth entry in the 2019 World Series of Darts. The tournament featured 16 players (eight PDC players facing eight regional qualifiers) and was held at the Claudelands Arena in Hamilton, New Zealand from 23 to 24 August 2019.

Michael van Gerwen won his 14th World Series title with an 8–1 win over Raymond van Barneveld in the final.

== Prize money ==
The total prize fund was £60,000.

Position (no. of players)		Prize money (Total: £60,000)
Winner	(1)	£20,000
Runner-up	(1)	£10,000
Semi-finalists	(2)	£5,000
Quarter-finalists	(4)	£2,500
First round	(8)	£1,250

== Qualifiers ==
The eight invited PDC representatives, (seeded according to the World Series Order of Merit) are:

1. (Scotland) Peter Wright (quarter-finals)
2. (Netherlands) Michael van Gerwen (champion)
3. (England) Rob Cross (semi-finals)
4. (Northern Ireland) Daryl Gurney (quarter-finals)
5. (Scotland) Gary Anderson (quarter-finals)
6. (Australia) Simon Whitlock (first round)
7. (England) James Wade (semi-finals)
8. (Netherlands) Raymond van Barneveld (runner-up)

Regional qualifier Corey Cadby withdrew from the tournament on 19 August, citing personal reasons. He was replaced by Warren Parry, the highest ranked New Zealand darts player not already qualified.

The regional qualifiers are:

Qualification	Player
PDC Tour Card Holders	(Australia) Kyle Anderson (first round)
PDC Tour Card Holders	(Australia) ~~Corey Cadby~~ (withdrew)
Wildcard	(New Zealand) Cody Harris (first round)
DPNZ Order of Merit #1	(New Zealand) Haupai Puha (first round)
DPNZ Order of Merit #2	(New Zealand) Craig Caldwell (first round)
DPNZ Qualifiers	(Australia) Damon Heta (first round)
DPNZ Qualifiers	(New Zealand) Ben Robb (quarter-finals)
DPA Qualifier	(Australia) David Platt (first round)
Highest DPNZ Player Not Already Qualified	(New Zealand) Warren Parry (first round)

== Draw ==
First round (best of 11 legs); 23 August
1	(Scotland) Peter Wright 94.24	6
(Australia) Damon Heta 82.17	1
(England) James Wade 92.71	6
(New Zealand) Craig Caldwell 87.71	5
4	(Northern Ireland) Daryl Gurney 95.78	6
(Australia) David Platt 89.51	2
(Netherlands) Raymond van Barneveld 95.49	6
(New Zealand) Cody Harris 90.35	5
2	(Netherlands) Michael van Gerwen 92.09	6
(Australia) Kyle Anderson 88.37	5
(Scotland) Gary Anderson 84.08	6
(New Zealand) Haupai Puha 84.99	3
3	(England) Rob Cross 99.84	6
(New Zealand) Warren Parry 79.06	2
(Australia) Simon Whitlock 93.51	4
(New Zealand) Ben Robb 96.87	6

Quarter-finals (best of 15 legs); 24 August
1	(Scotland) Peter Wright 90.39	4
(England) James Wade 93.09	8
4	(Northern Ireland) Daryl Gurney 92.52	6
(Netherlands) Raymond van Barneveld 94.71	8
2	(Netherlands) Michael van Gerwen 106.33	8
(Scotland) Gary Anderson 98.10	5
3	(England) Rob Cross 96.59	8
(New Zealand) Ben Robb 96.48	3

Semi-finals (best of 15 legs); 24 August
(England) James Wade 94.11	5
(Netherlands) Raymond van Barneveld 97.41	8
2	(Netherlands) Michael van Gerwen 96.45	8
3	(England) Rob Cross 93.60	3

Final (best of 15 legs); 24 August
(Netherlands) Raymond van Barneveld 91.18	1
2	(Netherlands) Michael van Gerwen 97.41	8
