= Shawn Brenneman =

Canadian darts player

Personal information
- Nickname: "The Man"
- Born: 6 August 1973 (age 53) Woodstock, Ontario, Canada
- Home town: Princeton, British Columbia, Canada

Sport
- Sport: Darts
- Playing since: 1993
- Darts: 24g Laserdarts
- Laterality: Right-handed
- Walk-on music: "The Man" by The Killers

Organisation (see split in darts)
- BDO: 1997–2007
- PDC: 2008–2020

WDF major events – best performances
- World Masters: Last 128: 1998

PDC premier events – best performances
- Desert Classic: Last 32: 2008

Other tournament wins
- Years
| ADO Buckeye Open | 2017 |
| ADO Shoot The Rapids | 2010 |
| ADO Steel City Open | 2017 |
| ADO Youngstown Charity Open | 2010 |
| Canadian Open | 1997 |
| Charlotte Open | 2011 |

Shawn Brenneman (born 6 August 1973) is a Canadian former professional darts player who played in Professional Darts Corporation (PDC) events.

== Career ==
Brenneman made his PDC debut at the 2008 Las Vegas Desert Classic, but who lost to Andy Hamilton of England.

Brenneman made his World Series of Darts debut at the 2017 US Darts Masters, where he lost to Peter Wright of Scotland. He also qualified for the 2019 US Darts Masters, where he lost to eventual champion Nathan Aspinall.

Brenneman quit the PDC in 2020.
