= 2019 US Darts Masters =

2019 Dafabet US Darts Masters

Tournament information
- Dates: 4–5 July 2019
- Venue: Mandalay Bay
- Location: Las Vegas
- Country: United States
- Organisation(s): PDC
- Format: Legs
- Prize fund: £60,000
- Winner's share: £20,000
- High checkout: 161 (England) Nathan Aspinall

Champion(s)
- (England) Nathan Aspinall

The 2019 Dafabet US Darts Masters was the third staging of the tournament by the Professional Darts Corporation. It was the first event in the 2019 World Series of Darts. The tournament featured 16 players (8 PDC representatives, and 8 North American representatives), and was held at the Mandalay Bay in Las Vegas on 4–5 July 2019.

Scotland's Gary Anderson was the defending champion, after beating England's Rob Cross 8–4 in the 2018 final, but was beaten 8–6 in the quarter-finals by Wales' Gerwyn Price.

England's Nathan Aspinall won his third PDC title, and his first on the World Series with an 8–4 win over England's Michael Smith in the final.

== Prize money ==
The total prize fund was £60,000.

Position (no. of players)		Prize money (Total: £60,000)
Winner	(1)	£20,000
Runner-up	(1)	£10,000
Semi-finalists	(2)	£5,000
Quarter-finalists	(4)	£2,500
First round	(8)	£1,250

== Qualifiers ==
The eight PDC representatives are:

1. (Netherlands) Michael van Gerwen (quarter-finals)
2. (England) Rob Cross (quarter-finals)
3. (Northern Ireland) Daryl Gurney (quarter-finals)
4. (Scotland) Gary Anderson (quarter-finals)
5. (Wales) Gerwyn Price (semi-finals)
6. (Scotland) Peter Wright (semi-finals)
7. (England) Michael Smith (runner-up)
8. (England) Nathan Aspinall (champion)

The North American qualifier winners were:

- (Canada) Jeff Smith (first round)
- (United States) Leonard Gates (first round)
- (United States) Danny Baggish (first round)
- (United States) Elliot Milk (first round)

The top 4 North American Order of Merit qualifiers were:

- (Canada) Shawn Brenneman (first round)
- (United States) Darin Young (first round)
- (Canada) Jim Long (first round)
- (United States) Gary Mawson (first round)

== Bracket ==
First round (best of 11 legs); 4 July
1	(Netherlands) Michael van Gerwen 99.83	6
(United States) Darin Young 92.12	4
(England) Michael Smith 92.90	6
(Canada) Jim Long 86.76	4
4	(Scotland) Gary Anderson 96.81	6
(United States) Elliot Milk 86.33	4
(Wales) Gerwyn Price 94.72	6
(United States) Gary Mawson 83.06	4
2	(England) Rob Cross 101.33	6
(United States) Leonard Gates 88.93	0
(England) Nathan Aspinall 98.29	6
(Canada) Shawn Brenneman 82.01	2
3	(Northern Ireland) Daryl Gurney 97.10	6
(United States) Danny Baggish 92.59	1
(Scotland) Peter Wright 93.68	6
(Canada) Jeff Smith 88.84	5

Quarter-finals (best of 15 legs); 5 July
1	(Netherlands) Michael van Gerwen 88.59	6
(England) Michael Smith 90.27	8
4	(Scotland) Gary Anderson 94.96	6
(Wales) Gerwyn Price 98.57	8
2	(England) Rob Cross 95.58	5
(England) Nathan Aspinall 100.37	8
3	(Northern Ireland) Daryl Gurney 99.14	6
(Scotland) Peter Wright 100.59	8

Semi-finals (best of 15 legs); 5 July
(England) Michael Smith 101.77	8
(Wales) Gerwyn Price 98.05	4
(England) Nathan Aspinall 104.21	8
(Scotland) Peter Wright 102.10	7

Final (best of 15 legs); 5 July
(England) Michael Smith 100.14	4
(England) Nathan Aspinall 106.70	8
