= James Bailey (darts player) =

Australian darts player

Personal information
- Nickname: "The Bull"
- Born: 22 October 1969 (age 56) Melbourne, Australia
- Home town: Durack, Australia

Sport
- Sport: Darts
- Playing since: 1990
- Darts: 20g
- Laterality: Left-handed
- Walk-on music: "Khe Sanh" by Cold Chisel

Organisation (see split in darts)
- BDO: 2011–2017
- PDC: 2017–

PDC premier events – best performances
- World Championship: Last 96: 2019, 2021

Other tournament wins
- Years
Australian Masters	2015
DPA Pro Tour	2018 (x2), 2019 (x4), 2021, 2024, 2025
Nerang Open	2013
Oceanic Masters	2018
Medal record
Men's Darts
Representing Australia
WDF Asia-Pacific Cup
Gold medal – first place	2014 Hong Kong	Team overall
Silver medal – second place	2014 Hong Kong	Men's pairs
Bronze medal – third place	2014 Hong Kong	Men's singles
Bronze medal – third place	2014 Hong Kong	Team event

James Bailey (born 22 October 1969) is an Australian professional darts player who plays in Professional Darts Corporation (PDC) events.

== Career ==
In 2018, Bailey won back-to-back events on the DPA Tour in St Clair, defeating Steve MacArthur in both finals.

Bailey qualified for the 2018 Melbourne Darts Masters, where he would lose 6–2 to Gary Anderson.

Later in the year, he won the Oceanic Masters final against Tim Pusey to qualify for the 2019 PDC World Darts Championship.

In his first-round match against Steve Lennon from Ireland, Bailey won four legs before losing 3–0.

== World Championship results ==
=== PDC ===
- 2019: First round (lost to Steve Lennon 0–3)
- 2021: First round (lost to Callan Rydz 1–3)
