= 2018 PDC Calendar =

This is the schedule of Professional Darts Corporation (PDC) events on the 2018 calendar, with player progression documented from the quarterfinals stage where applicable. This list includes European tour events, Players Championships events, World Series of Darts events and PDC majors. This list includes some regional tours, such as the ones in Nordic, Baltic and Oceanic regions, but does not include British Darts Organisation (BDO) events.

== January ==
Date	Tournament	Champions	Runners-up	Semi-finalists	Quarter-finalists
18–21 January	2018 UK Q-School; Wigan, England	Does not apply.			
18–21 January	2018 European Q-School; Hildesheim, Germany	Does not apply.			
26–28 January	2018 Masters Milton Keynes, England	(Netherlands) Michael van Gerwen	(Netherlands) Raymond van Barneveld	(Scotland) Gary Anderson (Austria) Mensur Suljović	(England) James Wade (Wales) Gerwyn Price (Scotland) Peter Wright (England) Rob Cross
26 January	2018 European Tour 1 – Nordic & Baltic Qualifier; Copenhagen, Denmark	Does not apply.			
26 January	2018 European Tour 2 – Nordic & Baltic Qualifier; Copenhagen, Denmark	Does not apply.			
26 January	2018 European Tour 1 – Eastern European Qualifier; Budapest, Hungary	Does not apply.			
27 January	2018 PDC Challenge Tour 1 Wigan, England	(England) Simon Preston	(England) Jarred Cole	(England) Mark Frost (Netherlands) Berry van Peer	(England) John Bowles (England) Michael Barnard (England) Martin Bradbury (England) Martyn Turner
27 January	2018 PDC Challenge Tour 2 Wigan, England	(Brazil) Diogo Portela	(England) Michael Barnard	(England) Peter Mitchell (England) Ben Burton	(England) David Pallett (England) Jamie Hughes (England) Richie Corner (England) Simon Preston
27 January	2018 PDC Nordic & Baltic Tour 1 Copenhagen, Denmark	(Finland) Kim Viljanen	(Finland) Ulf Ceder	(Latvia) Madars Razma (Sweden) Johan Engström	(Denmark) Per Laursen (Sweden) Magnus Caris (Sweden) Roland Lenngren (Iceland) Ægir Björnsson
27 January	2018 European Tour 3 – Nordic & Baltic Qualifier; Copenhagen, Denmark	Does not apply.			
27 January	2018 European Tour 2 – Eastern European Qualifier; Budapest, Hungary	Does not apply.			
27 January	2018 European Tour 3 – Eastern European Qualifier; Budapest, Hungary	Does not apply.			
28 January	2018 PDC Challenge Tour 3 Wigan, England	(England) Martin Atkins	(England) Michael Barnard	(England) Jason Lowe (England) Tony O'Shea	(England) Matt Padgett (England) Ricky Williams (Brazil) Diogo Portela (England) Martin Lukeman
28 January	2018 PDC Challenge Tour 4 Wigan, England	(Republic of Ireland) Jason Cullen	(Scotland) Cameron Menzies	(Netherlands) Yordi Meeuwisse (England) Steven Kirkby	(England) Stuart Kellett (England) Peter Mitchell (England) Colin Osborne (Wales) Rhys Griffin
28 January	2018 PDC Nordic & Baltic Tour 2 Copenhagen, Denmark	(Sweden) Daniel Larsson	(Lithuania) Darius Labanauskas	(Finland) Marko Kantele (Sweden) Edwin Torbjörnsson	(Denmark) Vladimir Andersen (Sweden) Dennis Nilsson (Finland) Ulf Ceder (Latvia) Madars Razma
28 January	2018 European Tour 4 – Eastern European Qualifier; Budapest, Hungary	Does not apply.			
28 January	2018 European Tour 5 – Eastern European Qualifier; Budapest, Hungary	Does not apply.			

== February ==
Date	Tournament	Champions	Runners-up	Semi-finalists	Quarter-finalists
1 February	2018 Premier League Darts, Night 1 Dublin, Ireland	Does not apply.			
2 February	2018 UK Open Qualifier 1 Wigan, England	(Netherlands) Michael van Gerwen	(England) Michael Smith	(Scotland) Peter Wright (England) Adrian Lewis	(Australia) Kyle Anderson (Belgium) Kim Huybrechts (Northern Ireland) Daryl Gurney (Spain) Jose Justicia
3 February	2018 UK Open Qualifier 2 Wigan, England	(Netherlands) Michael van Gerwen	(England) Darren Webster	(England) Ian White (Scotland) Peter Wright	(England) Justin Pipe (Poland) Krzysztof Ratajski (England) Richard North (England) Mervyn King
4 February	2018 UK Open Qualifier 3 Wigan, England	(England) Michael Smith	(Austria) Zoran Lerchbacher	(England) David Pallett (Scotland) John Henderson	(Netherlands) Michael van Gerwen (England) Joe Cullen (England) Jamie Hughes (England) James Wilson
8 February	2018 Premier League Darts, Night 2 Cardiff, Wales	Does not apply.			
9 February	2018 UK Open Qualifier 4 Wigan, England	(Scotland) Gary Anderson	(Netherlands) Jeffrey de Zwaan	(England) Jason Lowe (England) Rob Cross	(Wales) Jamie Lewis (England) Adrian Lewis (Poland) Krzysztof Ratajski (England) James Wade
10 February	2018 UK Open Qualifier 5 Wigan, England	(Australia) Corey Cadby	(England) Rob Cross	(Belgium) Kim Huybrechts (Scotland) Peter Wright	(England) Michael Smith (Netherlands) Vincent Kamphuis (Netherlands) Jelle Klaasen (England) Steve West
11 February	2018 UK Open Qualifier 6 Wigan, England	(Poland) Krzysztof Ratajski	(Northern Ireland) Daryl Gurney	(England) Rob Cross (Scotland) Peter Wright	(Scotland) John Goldie (Australia) Corey Cadby (Netherlands) Danny Noppert (England) David Pallett
15 February	2018 Premier League Darts, Night 3 Newcastle upon Tyne, England	Does not apply.			
16 February	2018 DPA Tour 1 St Clair, Australia	(Australia) Raymond Smith	(Australia) Tim Pusey	(Australia) Scott Johnson (Australia) Justin Thompson	(Australia) Tremaine Gallagher (New Zealand) Tahuna Irwin (Australia) Gordon Mathers (Australia) James Bailey
16 February	2018 European Tour 1 – UK Qualifier; Barnsley, England	Does not apply.			
16 February	2018 European Tour 2 – UK Qualifier; Barnsley, England	Does not apply.			
17 February	2018 PDC Players Championship 1 Barnsley, England	(Netherlands) Michael van Gerwen	(England) James Wade	(Wales) Gerwyn Price (England) Ryan Joyce	(England) Dave Chisnall (England) Ian White (Netherlands) Ron Meulenkamp (England) Rob Cross
17 February	2018 DPA Tour 2 St Clair, Australia	(Australia) James Bailey	(Australia) Steve MacArthur	(Australia) John Riley (Australia) Steve Powell	(Australia) Mike Bonser (Australia) Gordon Mathers (Australia) Tim Pusey (Australia) Tyler Fitch
18 February	2018 PDC Players Championship 2 Barnsley, England	(Netherlands) Michael van Gerwen	(Australia) Corey Cadby	(England) Simon Stevenson (England) Ian White	(England) Adrian Lewis (England) Ryan Joyce (England) Steve West (Scotland) Gary Anderson
18 February	2018 DPA Tour 3 St Clair, Australia	(Australia) James Bailey	(Australia) Steve MacArthur	(Australia) Ryan Lynch (New Zealand) Tahuna Irwin	(Australia) Gordon Mathers (Australia) Kerry Allen (Australia) Raymond Smith (Australia) Kalani Hillman
22 February	2018 Premier League Darts, Night 4 Berlin, Germany	Does not apply.			
23 February	2018 European Tour 4 – Nordic & Baltic Qualifier; Vilnius, Lithuania	Does not apply.			
23 February	2018 European Tour 5 – Nordic & Baltic Qualifier; Vilnius, Lithuania	Does not apply.			
24 February	2018 PDC Nordic & Baltic Tour 3 Vilnius, Lithuania	(Lithuania) Darius Labanauskas	(Norway) Cor Dekker	(Denmark) Per Laursen (Sweden) Johan Engström	(Sweden) Daniel Larsson (Lithuania) Mindaugas Barauskas (Finland) Kim Viljanen (Denmark) Nicolai Rasmussen
24 February	2018 EADC Tour 1 Moscow, Russia	(Russia) Aleksandr Oreshkin	(Russia) Maxim Aldoshin	(Russia) Vladimir Akshulakov (Russia) Grigory Kirilenko	(Russia) Alexander Basharin (Russia) Maxim Belov (Russia) Dmitriy Gorbunov (Russia) Evgenii Izotov
24 February	2018 European Tour 6 – Nordic & Baltic Qualifier; Vilnius, Lithuania	Does not apply.			
24 February	2018 European Tour 6 – Eastern European Qualifier; Prague, Czech Republic	Does not apply.			
24 February	2018 European Tour 7 – Eastern European Qualifier; Prague, Czech Republic	Does not apply.			
25 February	2018 PDC Nordic & Baltic Tour 4 Vilnius, Lithuania	(Lithuania) Darius Labanauskas	(Sweden) Daniel Larsson	(Sweden) Magnus Caris (Finland) Marko Kantele	(Latvia) Madars Razma (Finland) Pauli Finnilä (Denmark) Steen Lysen (Sweden) Oskar Lukasiak
25 February	2018 EADC Tour 2 Moscow, Russia	(Russia) Maxim Aldoshin	(Russia) Vladimir Akshulakov	(Russia) Roman Obukhov (Russia) Aleksandr Oreshkin	(Russia) Aleksei Kadochnikov (Russia) Maxim Belov (Russia) Alexander Shevel (Russia) Evgenii Izotov
25 February	2018 European Tour 8 – Eastern European Qualifier; Prague, Czech Republic	Does not apply.			
25 February	2018 European Tour 9 – Eastern European Qualifier; Prague, Czech Republic	Does not apply.			

== March ==
Date	Tournament	Champions	Runners-up	Semi-finalists	Quarter-finalists
1 March	2018 Premier League Darts, Night 5 Exeter, England	EVENT CANCELLED			
2–4 March	2018 UK Open Minehead, England	(Scotland) Gary Anderson	(Australia) Corey Cadby	(England) David Pallett (Wales) Robert Owen	(England) Steve West (Canada) John Part (Wales) Gerwyn Price (England) Rob Cross
8 March	2018 Premier League Darts, Night 6 Leeds, England	Does not apply.			
9 March	2018 European Tour 3 – UK Qualifier; Barnsley, England	Does not apply.			
9 March	2018 European Tour 4 – UK Qualifier; Barnsley, England	Does not apply.			
10 March	2018 PDC Asian Tour 1 Seoul, South Korea	(Hong Kong) Royden Lam	(Philippines) Noel Malicdem	(Philippines) Lourence Ilagan (Japan) Yuya Higuchi	(Philippines) Christian Perez (Philippines) Benedicto Ybanez (China) Lihao Wen (Japan) Yuki Yamada
10 March	2018 PDC Players Championship 3 Barnsley, England	(Scotland) Gary Anderson	(Scotland) Peter Wright	(Netherlands) Jeffrey de Graaf (Wales) Jamie Lewis	(Northern Ireland) Brendan Dolan (England) Richard North (England) Steve Hine (England) Joe Cullen
11 March	2018 PDC Asian Tour 2 Seoul, South Korea	(Japan) Seigo Asada	(South Korea) Hyun-chul Park	(Japan) Arashi Matsumoto (Taiwan) Pupo Llieh	(Japan) Keita Ono (Japan) Haruki Muramatsu (Singapore) Paul Lim (Philippines) Benedicto Ybanez
11 March	2018 PDC Players Championship 4 Barnsley, England	(Scotland) Gary Anderson	(Netherlands) Jeffrey de Zwaan	(England) Adrian Lewis (England) Dave Chisnall	(Netherlands) Jan Dekker (England) Jamie Caven (England) Stephen Bunting (England) Keegan Brown
15 March	2018 Premier League Darts, Night 7 Nottingham, England	Does not apply.			
17 March	2018 PDC Players Championship 5 Milton Keynes, England	(Netherlands) Michael van Gerwen	(England) Chris Dobey	(England) James Wade (England) Ryan Searle	(Scotland) Gary Anderson (Austria) Mensur Suljović (Germany) Gabriel Clemens (Republic of Ireland) William O'Connor
18 March	2018 PDC Players Championship 6 Milton Keynes, England	(England) Ian White	(England) Dave Chisnall	(England) James Wilson (England) Mervyn King	(England) Stephen Bunting (England) Rob Cross (Belgium) Dimitri Van den Bergh (Scotland) John Henderson
22 March	2018 Premier League Darts, Night 8 Glasgow, Scotland	Does not apply.			
22 March	2018 European Tour 1 – West/South European Qualifier; Leverkusen, Germany	Does not apply.			
22 March	2018 European Tour 1 – Host Nation Qualifier; Leverkusen, Germany	Does not apply.			
22 March	2018 European Tour 2 – West/South European Qualifier; Leverkusen, Germany	Does not apply.			
23 March	2018 DPA Tour 4 Seaford, Australia	(Australia) Corey Cadby	(Australia) Gordon Mathers	(Australia) Steve MacArthur (Australia) Tim Pusey	(Australia) Tyler Fitch (Australia) Stuart Coburn (Australia) Tic Bridge (Australia) Raymond O'Donnell
23–25 March	2018 European Darts Open Leverkusen, Germany	(Netherlands) Michael van Gerwen	(Scotland) Peter Wright	(England) Richard North (England) James Wade	(Australia) Simon Whitlock (Netherlands) Ron Meulenkamp (England) Joe Cullen (England) Mervyn King
24 March	2018 DPA Tour 5 Seaford, Australia	(Australia) Raymond Smith	(Australia) Steve MacArthur	(Australia) Corey Cadby (Australia) Lucas Cameron	(Australia) Raymond O'Donnell (Australia) Steve Fitzpatrick (Australia) Rhys Mathewson (Australia) Laurence Ryder
24 March	2018 PDC Challenge Tour 5 Milton Keynes, England	(Wales) John Davey	(England) Adrian Gray	(Czech Republic) František Humpula (Poland) Krzysztof Ratajski	(England) Adam Huckvale (England) Matt Padgett (England) Lee Evans (England) Jarred Cole
24 March	2018 PDC Challenge Tour 6 Milton Keynes, England	(England) Michael Barnard	(England) Jason Lowe	(England) Adam Huckvale (England) Robert Rickwood	(England) Dennis Smith (Belgium) Mike De Decker (England) Richie Corner (England) Dave Prins
25 March	2018 DPA Tour 6 Seaford, Australia	(Australia) Mal Cuming	(Australia) James Bailey	(Australia) Tim Pusey (Australia) Raymond Smith	(Australia) Steve MacArthur (Australia) Mick Cassar (Australia) Corey Cadby (Australia) Lucas Cameron
25 March	2018 PDC Challenge Tour 7 Milton Keynes, England	(Sweden) Dennis Nilsson	(England) Harry Ward	(England) Nicholas Bell (England) Barry Lynn	(Netherlands) Arjan Konterman (England) David Pallett (England) Rees Hall (Russia) Boris Koltsov
25 March	2018 PDC Challenge Tour 8 Milton Keynes, England	(England) Ted Evetts	(Poland) Krzysztof Ratajski	(England) Michael Barnard (England) Jason Lowe	(Republic of Ireland) John Joe O'Shea (England) Jarred Cole (England) David Pallett (England) Matt Padgett
29 March	2018 Premier League Darts, Night 9 Belfast, Northern Ireland	Does not apply.			
29 March	2018 European Tour 2 – Host Nation Qualifier; Munich, Germany	Does not apply.			
31 March–2 April	2018 German Darts Grand Prix Munich, Germany	(Netherlands) Michael van Gerwen	(Scotland) Peter Wright	(Northern Ireland) Daryl Gurney (England) James Wade	(England) Keegan Brown (England) Rob Cross (England) Joe Cullen (Germany) Max Hopp

== April ==
Date	Tournament	Champions	Runners-up	Semi-finalists	Quarter-finalists
5 April	2018 Premier League Darts, Night 10; Liverpool, England	Does not apply.			
6 April	2018 European Tour 5 – UK Qualifier; Barnsley, England	Does not apply.			
6 April	2018 European Tour 6 – UK Qualifier; Barnsley, England	Does not apply.			
7 April	2018 PDC Players Championship 7 Barnsley, England	(England) Michael Smith	(England) Adrian Lewis	(Netherlands) Jeffrey de Zwaan (England) Dave Chisnall	(England) Stephen Bunting (Germany) Max Hopp (England) James Wilson (Scotland) John Henderson
8 April	2018 PDC Players Championship 8 Barnsley, England	(Northern Ireland) Mickey Mansell	(England) Adrian Lewis	(Australia) Simon Whitlock (England) Josh Payne	(Wales) Mark Webster (England) James Wilson (Wales) Gerwyn Price (Spain) Toni Alcinas
12 April	2018 Premier League Darts, Night 11; Sheffield, England	Does not apply.			
12 April	2018 European Tour 3 – West/South European Qualifier; Saarbrücken, Germany	Does not apply.			
12 April	2018 European Tour 3 – Host Nation Qualifier; Saarbrücken, Germany	Does not apply.			
12 April	2018 European Tour 4 – West/South European Qualifier; Saarbrücken, Germany	Does not apply.			
13 April	2018 DPA Tour 7 Barrack Heights, Australia	(Australia) Corey Cadby	(Australia) Lucas Cameron	(Australia) Raymond O'Donnell (Australia) Dave Marland	(Australia) Bill Aitken (Australia) Clayton Collins (Australia) Steve MacArthur (Australia) Raymond Smith
13–15 April	2018 German Darts Open Saarbrücken, Germany	(Germany) Max Hopp	(England) Michael Smith	(England) Ian White (England) Rob Cross	(Netherlands) Michael van Gerwen (England) Mervyn King (England) Joe Cullen (Wales) Gerwyn Price
14 April	2018 DPA Tour 8 Barrack Heights, Australia	(Australia) Corey Cadby	(Australia) Laurence Ryder	(Australia) Raymond O'Donnell (Australia) Tim Pusey	(Australia) Bill Aitken (Australia) Steve MacArthur (Australia) Raymond Smith (Australia) Mark Colbongon
14 April	2018 PDC Development Tour 1 Wigan, England	(Northern Ireland) Nathan Rafferty	(Canada) Dawson Murschell	(Austria) Rusty-Jake Rodriguez (England) Callan Rydz	(England) Mark Baxter (Netherlands) Geert Nentjes (England) George Gardner (England) Bradley Kirk
14 April	2018 PDC Development Tour 2 Wigan, England	(Netherlands) Wessel Nijman	(England) Bradley Brooks	(England) Tom Lonsdale (Republic of Ireland) Dean Finn	(Belgium) Mike De Decker (Republic of Ireland) Jordan Boyce (Canada) Dawson Murschell (Netherlands) Jimmy Hendriks
15 April	2018 DPA Tour 9 Barrack Heights, Australia	(Australia) Corey Cadby	(Australia) Laurence Ryder	(Australia) Gordon Mathers (Australia) Dave Marland	(Australia) Raymond Smith (Australia) Marshall Allen (Australia) Bill Aitken (Australia) Steve MacArthur
15 April	2018 PDC Development Tour 3 Wigan, England	(England) Rob Hewson	(Netherlands) Melvin de Fijter	(England) Tommy Wilson (Belgium) Mike De Decker	(England) Jaikob Selby (Netherlands) Patrick van den Booggard (England) Carl Batchelor (England) Owen Maiden
15 April	2018 PDC Development Tour 4 Wigan, England	(Netherlands) Niels Zonneveld	(England) Joe Davis	(Netherlands) Geert Nentjes (Scotland) William Borland	(England) Ted Evetts (England) Rob Hewson (England) Declan Cox (Netherlands) Jimmy Hendriks
18 April	2018 Premier League Darts, Night 12A; Rotterdam, Netherlands	Does not apply.			
19 April	2018 Premier League Darts, Night 12B; Rotterdam, Netherlands	Does not apply.			
19 April	2018 European Tour 4 – Host Nation Qualifier; Premstätten, Austria	Does not apply.			
20–22 April	2018 Austrian Darts Open Premstätten, Austria	(Wales) Jonny Clayton	(Wales) Gerwyn Price	(Austria) Mensur Suljović (England) Joe Cullen	(England) Ian White (Northern Ireland) Daryl Gurney (England) Rob Cross (England) Michael Smith
26 April	2018 Premier League Darts, Night 13; Manchester, England	Does not apply.			
28 April	2018 PDC Asian Tour 3 Macau, Macau	(Philippines) Lourence Ilagan	(Philippines) Alexis Toylo	(Japan) Haruki Muramatsu (Philippines) Paolo Nebrida	(Japan) Hiroto Ichimiya (Philippines) Donjem Dimaculangan (Japan) Seigo Asada (Japan) Yuki Yamada
28 April	2018 PDC Players Championship 9 Wigan, England	(Netherlands) Michael van Gerwen	(England) Scott Taylor	(England) James Wade (England) Jason Lowe	(Wales) Jonny Clayton (Northern Ireland) Daryl Gurney (England) Adrian Lewis (Scotland) Gary Anderson
29 April	2018 PDC Asian Tour 4 Macau, Macau	(Philippines) Lourence Ilagan	(Hong Kong) Royden Lam	(Hong Kong) Ho-Yin Shek (Philippines) Paolo Nebrida	(Taiwan) Pupo Teng Lieh (Philippines) Noel Malicdem (Japan) Seigo Asada (Philippines) Alexis Toylo
29 April	2018 EADC Tour 3 Moscow, Russia	(Russia) Aleksei Kadochnikov	(Russia) Maxim Aldoshin	(Russia) Aleksander Shevel (Russia) Vladimir Akshulakov	(Russia) Aleksandr Oreshkin (Russia) Vitaly Hohryakov (Russia) Roman Obukhov (Russia) Evgenii Izotov
29 April	2018 EADC Tour 4 Moscow, Russia	(Russia) Aleksei Kadochnikov	(Russia) Maxim Aldoshin	(Russia) Maxim Belov (Russia) Roman Obukhov	(Belarus) Andrey Pontus (Russia) Evgenie Ivanov (Russia) Evgenii Izotov (Russia) Andrey Pryalkin
29 April	2018 PDC Players Championship 10 Wigan, England	(Netherlands) Jeffrey de Zwaan	(Wales) Jonny Clayton	(England) Stephen Bunting (Germany) Gabriel Clemens	(Netherlands) Michael van Gerwen (Germany) Martin Schindler (Northern Ireland) Mickey Mansell (England) James Wilson
30 April	2018 EADC Tour 5 Moscow, Russia	(Russia) Roman Obuhkov	(Russia) Aleksei Kadochnikov	(Belarus) Andrey Pontus (Russia) Alexander Basharin	(Russia) Aleksandr Oreshkin (Russia) Grigory Kirilenko (Russia) Aleksander Shevel (Russia) Evgenii Izotov
30 April	2018 EADC Tour 6 Moscow, Russia	(Russia) Aleksei Kadochnikov	(Russia) Dmitriy Gorbunov	(Russia) Aleksandr Oreshkin (Russia) Maxim Belov	(Belarus) Andrey Pontus (Russia) Roman Obukhov (Russia) Aleksander Shevel (Russia) Oleg Khromenko

== May ==
Date	Tournament	Champions	Runners-up	Semi-finalists	Quarter-finalists
3 May	2018 Premier League Darts, Night 14; Birmingham, England	Does not apply.			
3 May	2018 European Tour 5 – West/South European Qualifier; Sindelfingen, Germany	Does not apply.			
3 May	2018 European Tour 5 – Host Nation Qualifier; Sindelfingen, Germany	Does not apply.			
3 May	2018 European Tour 6 – West/South European Qualifier; Sindelfingen, Germany	Does not apply.			
4–6 May	2018 European Darts Grand Prix Sindelfingen, Germany	(Netherlands) Michael van Gerwen	(England) James Wade	(England) Michael Smith (Netherlands) Danny Noppert	(England) Dave Chisnall (Wales) Jamie Lewis (England) Joe Cullen (Australia) Simon Whitlock
5 May	2018 PDC Challenge Tour 9 Wigan, England	(New Zealand) Cody Harris	(Netherlands) Yordi Meeuwisse	(Republic of Ireland) Jason Cullen (Austria) Michael Rasztovits	(Russia) Boris Koltsov (England) Simon Preston (England) Robert Rickwood (Netherlands) Wilco Vermeulen
5 May	2018 PDC Challenge Tour 10 Wigan, England	(England) Michael Barnard	(England) Martin Atkins	(England) Ted Evetts (England) Matthew Dennant	(Sweden) Dennis Nilsson (England) Barry Lynn (England) Curtis Hammond (England) Adam Smith-Neale
6 May	2018 PDC Challenge Tour 11 Wigan, England	(England) Michael Barnard	(England) Andy Jenkins	(Wales) Barrie Bates (Sweden) Dennis Nilsson	(England) Ted Evetts (Russia) Boris Koltsov (England) Martin Atkins (Scotland) Cameron Menzies
6 May	2018 PDC Challenge Tour 12 Wigan, England	(England) Adam Huckvale	(Scotland) Darren Beveridge	(England) Stuart Kellett (Sweden) Dennis Nilsson	(New Zealand) Cody Harris (England) Paul Phillips (England) Andy Boulton (Netherlands) Yordi Meeuwisse
10 May	2018 Premier League Darts, Night 15; Aberdeen, Scotland	Does not apply.			
10 May	2018 European Tour 6 – Host Nation Qualifier; Zwolle, Netherlands	Does not apply.			
11–13 May	2018 Dutch Darts Masters Zwolle, Netherlands	(Netherlands) Michael van Gerwen	(Republic of Ireland) Steve Lennon	(Northern Ireland) Daryl Gurney (Belgium) Kim Huybrechts	(Australia) Kyle Anderson (England) Stephen Bunting (Scotland) Peter Wright (Austria) Mensur Suljović
17 May	2018 Premier League play-offs London, England	(Netherlands) Michael van Gerwen	(England) Michael Smith	(England) Rob Cross (Scotland) Gary Anderson	Does not apply.
18 May	2018 DPA Tour 10 Mitchelton, Australia	(Australia) Corey Cadby	(Australia) Tim Pusey	(Australia) Laurence Ryder (Australia) Steve MacArthur	(Australia) John Bunyard (Australia) Andrew Eagers (Australia) Gordon Mathers (Australia) Dave Williams
18 May	2018 European Tour 7 – UK Qualifier; Milton Keynes, England	Does not apply.			
18 May	2018 European Tour 8 – UK Qualifier; Milton Keynes, England	Does not apply.			
19 May	2018 PDC Players Championship 11 Milton Keynes, England	(Scotland) Gary Anderson	(Germany) Gabriel Clemens	(Scotland) Peter Wright (England) Darren Webster	(England) Ricky Evans (Northern Ireland) Brendan Dolan (England) Michael Smith (England) Adrian Lewis
19 May	2018 DPA Tour 11 Mitchelton, Australia	(Australia) Corey Cadby	(Australia) Raymond Smith	(Australia) Tim Pusey (Australia) Steve MacArthur	(Australia) Robbie King (Australia) Raymond O'Donnell (Australia) Brendan Cunney (Australia) Stewart Smith
20 May	2018 PDC Players Championship 12 Milton Keynes, England	(England) Josh Payne	(Scotland) Peter Wright	(Northern Ireland) Brendan Dolan (England) Ian White	(England) Ricky Evans (Northern Ireland) Mickey Mansell (England) Michael Smith (Wales) Jonny Clayton
20 May	2018 DPA Tour 12 Mitchelton, Australia	(Australia) Corey Cadby	(Australia) Raymond Smith	(New Zealand) Mick Lacey (Australia) Tim Pusey	(Australia) Marshall Allen (Australia) Steve MacArthur (Australia) Robbie King (Australia) Raymond O'Donnell
25 May	2018 German Darts Masters Gelsenkirchen, Germany	(Austria) Mensur Suljović	(Belgium) Dimitri Van den Bergh	(Scotland) Gary Anderson (Scotland) Peter Wright	(Netherlands) Michael van Gerwen (Wales) Jamie Lewis (Netherlands) Raymond van Barneveld (England) Rob Cross
25 May	2018 European Tour 7 – Nordic & Baltic Qualifier; Vääksy, Finland	Does not apply.			
25 May	2018 European Tour 9 – Nordic & Baltic Qualifier; Vääksy, Finland	Does not apply.			
26 May	2018 PDC Nordic & Baltic Tour 5 Vääksy, Finland	(Finland) Marko Kantele	(Finland) Ulf Ceder	(Finland) Vesa Porkola (Sweden) Daniel Larsson	(Lithuania) Darius Labanauskas (Latvia) Madars Razma (Norway) Cor Dekker (Sweden) Dennis Nilsson
26 May	2018 PDC Development Tour 5 Hildesheim, Germany	(Austria) Rowby-John Rodriguez	(England) George Killington	(England) Ryan Meikle (Netherlands) Justin van Tergouw	(Austria) Rusty-Jake Rodriguez (Netherlands) Sven Groen (England) Rhys Hayden (England) Tommy Wilson
26 May	2018 PDC Development Tour 6 Hildesheim, Germany	(Belgium) Kenny Neyens	(England) Jarred Cole	(Germany) Martin Schindler (Netherlands) Jimmy Hendriks	(England) George Gardner (Republic of Ireland) Jordan Boyce (England) Bradley Kirk (Netherlands) Kevin Doets
26 May	2018 European Tour 10 – Nordic & Baltic Qualifier; Vääksy, Finland	Does not apply.			
27 May	2018 PDC Nordic & Baltic Tour 6 Vääksy, Finland	(Norway) Cor Dekker	(Sweden) Magnus Caris	(Finland) Kim Viljanen (Finland) Marko Kantele	(Lithuania) Darius Labanauskas (Finland) Ulf Ceder (Sweden) Daniel Larsson (Finland) Vesa Porkola
27 May	2018 PDC Development Tour 7 Hildesheim, Germany	(England) Luke Humphries	(Netherlands) Niels Zonneveld	(England) Tommy Wilson (England) George Killington	(Canada) Dawson Murschell (England) Ted Evetts (Belgium) Dimitri Van den Bergh (Netherlands) Justin van Tergouw
27 May	2018 PDC Development Tour 8 Hildesheim, Germany	(England) Ted Evetts	(Netherlands) Geert Nentjes	(England) Josh McCarthy (England) George Killington	(England) Rhys Hayden (England) Lewis Pride (England) Rex Cole (Netherlands) Jeffrey de Zwaan
30 May	2018 European Tour 7 – West/South European Qualifier; Frankfurt, Germany	Does not apply.			
30 May	2018 European Tour 8 – West/South European Qualifier; Frankfurt, Germany	Does not apply.			
31 May–3 June	2018 PDC World Cup of Darts Frankfurt, Germany	(Netherlands) van Gerwen/van Barneveld	(Scotland) Wright/Anderson	(Australia) Whitlock/Anderson (Belgium) Huybrechts/Van den Bergh	(Japan) Asada/Muramatsu (Wales) Price/Clayton (England) Cross/Chisnall (Germany) Hopp/Schindler

== June ==
Date	Tournament	Champions	Runners-up	Semi-finalists	Quarter-finalists
7 June	2018 European Tour 7 – Host Nation Qualifier; Gibraltar, Gibraltar	Does not apply.			
8–10 June	2018 Gibraltar Darts Trophy Gibraltar, Gibraltar	(Netherlands) Michael van Gerwen	(England) Adrian Lewis	(England) Steve West (Australia) Paul Nicholson	(Wales) Jonny Clayton (England) Rob Cross (Wales) Gerwyn Price (Scotland) Peter Wright
9 June	2018 PDC Development Tour 9 Wigan, England	(Germany) Martin Schindler	(Belgium) Dimitri Van den Bergh	(England) Luke Humphries (Netherlands) Maikel Verberk	(England) Ryan Meikle (England) Callan Rydz (Wales) Rhys Griffin (Netherlands) Berry van Peer
9 June	2018 PDC Development Tour 10 Wigan, England	(Germany) Martin Schindler	(England) George Gardner	(Austria) Rowby-John Rodriguez (Netherlands) Geert Nentjes	(Austria) Rusty-Jake Rodriguez (England) George Killington (Germany) Nico Blum (Scotland) Andrew Davidson
10 June	2018 PDC Development Tour 11 Wigan, England	(England) Ryan Meikle	(Austria) Rowby-John Rodriguez	(England) Ted Evetts (England) Lee Budgen	(England) Tommy Wilson (Austria) Rusty-Jake Rodriguez (Germany) Nico Blum (Netherlands) Jimmy Hendriks
10 June	2018 PDC Development Tour 12 Wigan, England	(England) Ted Evetts	(Belgium) Dimitri Van den Bergh	(Netherlands) Melvin de Fijter (Netherlands) Mike van Duivenbode	(England) Rob Hewson (Germany) Martin Schindler (Germany) Christopher Hänsch (Scotland) William Borland
15 June	2018 DPA Tour 13 North Hobart, Australia	(Australia) Raymond Smith	(Australia) Steve MacArthur	(Australia) Tim Pusey (Australia) Ryan Lynch	(Australia) Mike Bonser (Australia) Chirs Vasey (Australia) Steve Fitzpatrick (Australia) Steve Powell
15 June	2018 European Tour 9 – UK Qualifier; Barnsley, England	Does not apply.			
15 June	2018 European Tour 10 – UK Qualifier; Barnsley, England	Does not apply.			
16 June	2018 DPA Tour 14 North Hobart, Australia	(Australia) Raymond Smith	(Australia) Lucas Cameron	(Australia) James Bailey (Australia) Chris Vasey	(Australia) Tim Pusey (Australia) Steve Fitzpatrick (Australia) Raymond O'Donnell (Australia) Loz Ryder
16 June	2018 PDC Players Championship 13 Wigan, England	(England) Rob Cross	(England) Ian White	(Netherlands) Jermaine Wattimena (England) Stephen Bunting	(Netherlands) Dirk van Duijvenbode (England) Peter Jacques (England) Ricky Evans (Wales) Jonny Clayton
17 June	2018 DPA Tour 15 North Hobart, Australia	(Australia) Gordon Mathers	(Australia) James Bailey	(Australia) Raymond Smith (Australia) Steve Fitzpatrick	(Australia) Steve Powell (Australia) Tim Pusey (Australia) Mick Pearce (Australia) Alex Evans
17 June	2018 PDC Players Championship 14 Wigan, England	(Scotland) Peter Wright	(England) Rob Cross	(Netherlands) Jermaine Wattimena (England) Michael Smith	(Belgium) Dimitri Van den Bergh (Australia) Simon Whitlock (England) Adam Hunt (England) Dave Chisnall
21 June	2018 European Tour 8 – Nordic & Baltic Qualifier; Copenhagen, Denmark	Does not apply.			
21 June	2018 European Tour 8 – Host Nation Qualifier; Copenhagen, Denmark	Does not apply.			
22–24 June	2018 Danish Darts Open Copenhagen, Denmark	(Austria) Mensur Suljović	(Australia) Simon Whitlock	(England) Steve West (England) Adrian Lewis	(Northern Ireland) Brendan Dolan (England) Mervyn King (England) Joe Cullen (Scotland) Peter Wright
23 June	2018 PDC Asian Tour 5 Kobe, Japan	(Hong Kong) Royden Lam	(Japan) Seigo Asada	(Japan) Shin Higashida (Japan) Kazuki Hagane	(Japan) Yuya Higuchi (Japan) Hiroto Ichimiya (Taiwan) Pupo Teng Lieh (Japan) Haruki Muramatsu
24 June	2018 PDC Asian Tour 6 Kobe, Japan	(Philippines) Noel Malicdem	(Japan) Daisuke Atamatsu	(Japan) Shingo Enomata (Philippines) Christian Perez	(Japan) Mitsumasa Hoshina (Philippines) Paolo Nebrida (Japan) Keita Ono (Japan) Atsushi Homma
26 June	2018 PDC Players Championship 15 Barnsley, England	(England) Mervyn King	(England) James Wade	(Wales) Mark Webster (England) Steve Beaton	(England) Ian White (England) Jarred Cole (England) Rob Cross (England) Michael Smith
27 June	2018 PDC Players Championship 16 Barnsley, England	(England) Ian White	(England) Darren Webster	(England) Steve Beaton (England) Adrian Lewis	(England) Bradley Brooks (England) Dave Chisnall (Northern Ireland) Brendan Dolan (Netherlands) Danny Noppert
28 June	2018 European Tour 9 – West/South European Qualifier; Hamburg, Germany	Does not apply.			
28 June	2018 European Tour 9 – Host Nation Qualifier; Hamburg, Germany	Does not apply.			
29 June–1 July	2018 European Darts Matchplay Hamburg, Germany	(Netherlands) Michael van Gerwen	(Republic of Ireland) William O'Connor	(England) Stephen Bunting (England) Andy Boulton	(England) Ian White (England) Justin Pipe (Wales) Gerwyn Price (Austria) Mensur Suljović

== July ==
Date	Tournament	Champions	Runners-up	Semi-finalists	Quarter-finalists
6–7 July	2018 US Darts Masters Las Vegas, United States	(Scotland) Gary Anderson	(England) Rob Cross	(Scotland) Peter Wright (England) James Wade	(Northern Ireland) Daryl Gurney (England) Michael Smith (Canada) Dawson Murschell (Netherlands) Michael van Gerwen
13–14 July	2018 Shanghai Darts Masters Shanghai, China	(England) Michael Smith	(England) Rob Cross	(Netherlands) Michael van Gerwen (Scotland) Peter Wright	(Hong Kong) Royden Lam (Northern Ireland) Daryl Gurney (England) James Wade (Wales) Gerwyn Price
21–29 July	2018 World Matchplay Blackpool, England	(Scotland) Gary Anderson	(Austria) Mensur Suljović	(Netherlands) Jeffrey de Zwaan (Scotland) Peter Wright	(England) Dave Chisnall (England) Joe Cullen (Australia) Simon Whitlock (England) Darren Webster

== August ==
Date	Tournament	Champions	Runners-up	Semi-finalists	Quarter-finalists
3–5 August	2018 Auckland Darts Masters Auckland, New Zealand	(Netherlands) Michael van Gerwen	(Netherlands) Raymond van Barneveld	(Australia) Simon Whitlock (Scotland) Peter Wright	(England) Rob Cross (New Zealand) Mark McGrath (Scotland) Gary Anderson (Australia) Kyle Anderson
10 August	2018 European Tour 11 – Nordic & Baltic Qualifier; Gothenburg, Sweden	Does not apply.			
10 August	2018 European Tour 12 – Nordic & Baltic Qualifier; Gothenburg, Sweden	Does not apply.			
10–12 August	2018 Melbourne Darts Masters Melbourne, Australia	(Scotland) Peter Wright	(England) Michael Smith	(Netherlands) Michael van Gerwen (Scotland) Gary Anderson	(Australia) Simon Whitlock (Netherlands) Raymond van Barneveld (England) Rob Cross (Australia) Damon Heta
11 August	2018 European Tour 13 – Nordic & Baltic Qualifier; Gothenburg, Sweden	Does not apply.			
11 August	2018 PDC Nordic & Baltic Tour 7 Gothenburg, Sweden	(Sweden) Daniel Larsson	(Finland) Kim Viljanen	(Lithuania) Darius Labanauskas (Sweden) Mauri Tuutijarvi	(Latvia) Madars Razma (Sweden) Andreas Harrysson (Sweden) Magnus Caris (Sweden) Oskar Lukasiak
12 August	2018 PDC Nordic & Baltic Tour 8 Gothenburg, Sweden	(Finland) Marko Kantele	(Lithuania) Darius Labanauskas	(Sweden) Andreas Harrysson (Latvia) Madars Razma	(Sweden) Johan Engström (Sweden) Daniel Larsson (Sweden) Ricky Naumann (Denmark) Per Laursen
17–19 August	2018 Brisbane Darts Masters Brisbane, Australia	(England) Rob Cross	(Netherlands) Michael van Gerwen	(Scotland) Peter Wright (Netherlands) Raymond van Barneveld	(Australia) Raymond Smith (Australia) Corey Cadby (Australia) Kyle Anderson (Scotland) Gary Anderson
18 August	2018 PDC Asian Tour 7 Kuala Lumpur, Malaysia	(Japan) Seigo Asada	(Hong Kong) Royden Lam	(Philippines) Noel Malicdem (Philippines) Lourence Ilagan	(Thailand) Thanawat Gaweenuntawong (Malaysia) Cher Kai Ang (Japan) Keita Ono (Japan) Shingo Enomata
19 August	2018 PDC Asian Tour 8 Kuala Lumpur, Malaysia	(Philippines) Lourence Ilagan	(Singapore) Harith Lim	(Hong Kong) Kai Fan Leung (Singapore) Paul Lim	(Hong Kong) Royden Lam (Philippines) Ryan Condat (Japan) Seigo Asada (Philippines) Alexis Toylo
25 August	2018 European Tour 10 – Eastern European Qualifier; Prague, Czech Republic	Does not apply.			
25 August	2018 European Tour 11 – Eastern European Qualifier; Prague, Czech Republic	Does not apply.			
26 August	2018 European Tour 12 – Eastern European Qualifier; Prague, Czech Republic	Does not apply.			
26 August	2018 European Tour 13 – Eastern European Qualifier; Prague, Czech Republic	Does not apply.			
30 August	2018 European Tour 10 – West/South European Qualifier; Hildesheim, Germany	Does not apply.			
30 August	2018 European Tour 11 – West/South European Qualifier; Hildesheim, Germany	Does not apply.			
30 August	2018 European Tour 10 – Host Nation Qualifier; Hildesheim, Germany	Does not apply.			
31 August–2 September	2018 German Darts Championship Hildesheim, Germany	(Netherlands) Michael van Gerwen	(England) James Wilson	(England) Joe Cullen (Austria) Mensur Suljović	(England) Dave Chisnall (England) Adrian Lewis (Netherlands) Ron Meulenkamp (England) Rob Cross

== September ==
Date	Tournament	Champions	Runners-up	Semi-finalists	Quarter-finalists
3 September	2018 European Tour 11 – UK Qualifier; Barnsley, England	Does not apply.			
3 September	2018 European Tour 12 – UK Qualifier; Barnsley, England	Does not apply.			
4 September	2018 PDC Players Championship 17 Barnsley, England	(Scotland) Peter Wright	(Northern Ireland) Daryl Gurney	(Germany) Martin Schindler (England) James Wade	(Australia) Simon Whitlock (Belgium) Kim Huybrechts (England) Rob Cross (England) Michael Smith
5 September	2018 PDC Players Championship 18 Barnsley, England	(England) Nathan Aspinall	(England) Ryan Searle	(England) Ian White (Netherlands) Ron Meulenkamp	(England) Steve Beaton (Wales) Gerwyn Price (Scotland) John Henderson (Republic of Ireland) Steve Lennon
6 September	2018 European Tour 11 – Host Nation Qualifier; Maastricht, Netherlands	Does not apply.			
7–9 September	2018 Dutch Darts Championship Maastricht, Netherlands	(England) Ian White	(England) Ricky Evans	(England) Ritchie Edhouse (Scotland) Peter Wright	(England) Joe Cullen (Australia) Kyle Anderson (Australia) Simon Whitlock (England) Adrian Lewis
7 September	2018 DPA Tour 16 Mitchelton, Australia	(Australia) Raymond Smith	(Australia) Gordon Mathers	(Australia) Laurie Loch (Australia) Mike Bonser	(Australia) Rob Modra (Australia) Bill Aitken (Australia) Stuart Leach (Australia) Robbie King
8 September	2018 DPA Tour 17 Mitchelton, Australia	(Australia) Mark Smyth	(Australia) James Bailey	(Australia) Rob Modra (Australia) Gordon Mathers	(Australia) Steve Duke Jr (Australia) Raymond Smith (Australia) Stuart Leach (Australia) Mike Bonser
8 September	2018 PDC Asian Tour 9 Taipei, Taiwan	(Japan) Seigo Asada	(Singapore) Paul Lim	(Japan) Yuki Yamada (Hong Kong) Royden Lam	(Japan) Haruki Muramatsu (Philippines) Noel Malicdem (Japan) Seiya Asakura (Japan) Daisuke Akamatsu
8 September	2018 PDC Challenge Tour 13 Wigan, England	(England) Jamie Hughes	(New Zealand) Cody Harris	(England) David Pallett (Scotland) Cameron Menzies	(Wales) Jonathan Worsley (Finland) Marko Kantele (England) Ted Evetts (England) Michael Barnard
8 September	2018 PDC Challenge Tour 14 Wigan, England	(Poland) Krzysztof Ratajski	(England) Mick Todd	(England) Jamie Hughes (Russia) Boris Koltsov	(England) Chas Barstow (England) Gavin Smith (England) Matthew Dennant (England) Peter Mitchell
9 September	2018 DPA Tour 18 Mitchelton, Australia	(Australia) Tim Pusey	(Australia) Robbie King	(Australia) Mike Bonser (Australia) Gordon Mathers	(Australia) Nick Kanefake (Australia) Mick Lacey (Australia) Brendan McCausland (Australia) Raymond Hannah
9 September	2018 PDC Asian Tour 10 Taipei, Taiwan	(Singapore) Paul Lim	(Philippines) Lourence Ilagan	(Japan) Haruki Muramatsu (Philippines) Alexis Toylo	(Japan) Seigo Asada (Philippines) Noel Malicdem (Japan) Daisuke Akamatsu (Hong Kong) Royden Lam
9 September	2018 PDC Challenge Tour 15 Wigan, England	(Scotland) Cameron Menzies	(England) Mark Frost	(England) Mark Walsh (England) Andy Boulton	(England) Matt Clark (Wales) Barrie Bates (Belgium) Mike De Decker (Netherlands) Yordi Meeuwisse
9 September	2018 PDC Challenge Tour 16 Wigan, England	(England) Lee Budgen	(England) Michael Barnard	(England) Andy Boulton (England) Matthew Dennant	(England) Kevin Garcia (England) Richie Corner (Poland) Krzysztof Ratajski (Wales) Barrie Bates
13 September	2018 European Tour 12 – West/South European Qualifier; Riesa, Germany	Does not apply.			
13 September	2018 European Tour 13 – West/South European Qualifier; Riesa, Germany	Does not apply.			
13 September	2018 European Tour 12 – Host Nation Qualifier; Riesa, Germany	Does not apply.			
14–16 September	2018 International Darts Open Riesa, Germany	(Wales) Gerwyn Price	(Australia) Simon Whitlock	(England) Steve West (Netherlands) Danny Noppert	(England) Ryan Searle (England) Adrian Lewis (England) Darren Webster (England) James Richardson
22–23 September	2018 Champions League of Darts Brighton, England	(Scotland) Gary Anderson	(Scotland) Peter Wright	(Netherlands) Michael van Gerwen (Austria) Mensur Suljović	(Northern Ireland) Daryl Gurney (England) Dave Chisnall (England) Rob Cross (Australia) Simon Whitlock
22 September	2018 PDC Development Tour 13 Peterborough, England	(England) Luke Humphries	(Netherlands) Justin van Tergouw	(England) Joe Davis (Belgium) Kenny Neyens	(Germany) Christian Bunse (Netherlands) Maikel Verberk (England) Rhys Hayden (England) Scott Dale
22 September	2018 PDC Development Tour 14 Peterborough, England	(England) George Killington	(Germany) Christian Bunse	(Netherlands) Danny van Trijp (Netherlands) Geert Nentjes	(England) Callan Rydz (England) Fred Box (England) Scott Dale (Belgium) Mike De Decker
23 September	2018 PDC Development Tour 15 Peterborough, England	(Belgium) Dimitri Van den Bergh	(England) Lee Budgen	(Northern Ireland) Nathan Rafferty (England) Luke Humphries	(Canada) Dawson Murschell (England) Bradley Kirk (Germany) Christian Bunse (England) Jack Vincent
23 September	2018 PDC Development Tour 16 Peterborough, England	(England) Jarred Cole	(Germany) Christian Bunse	(Belgium) Dimitri Van den Bergh (England) Scott Dale	(Netherlands) Wessel Nijman (Austria) Rowby-John Rodriguez (Northern Ireland) Nathan Rafferty (England) Lewis Pride
27 September	2018 European Tour 13 – UK Qualifier; Dublin, Ireland	Does not apply.			
28 September	2018 PDC Players Championship 19 Dublin, Ireland	(Germany) Max Hopp	(Latvia) Madars Razma	(England) Andrew Gilding (England) James Wilson	(Netherlands) Michael van Gerwen (England) Steve West (England) Adrian Lewis (Netherlands) Jermaine Wattimena
29 September	2018 PDC Players Championship 20 Dublin, Ireland	(Netherlands) Danny Noppert	(England) Ian White	(England) Rob Cross (England) Keegan Brown	(England) Chris Quantock (Belgium) Kim Huybrechts (Austria) Mensur Suljović (Scotland) Robert Thornton
30 September–6 October	2018 World Grand Prix Dublin, Ireland	(Netherlands) Michael van Gerwen	(Scotland) Peter Wright	(Northern Ireland) Daryl Gurney (Austria) Mensur Suljović	(England) Dave Chisnall (Scotland) Gary Anderson (England) James Wilson (Wales) Gerwyn Price

== October ==
Date	Tournament	Champions	Runners-up	Semi-finalists	Quarter-finalists
5 October	2019 European Tour 1 – Nordic & Baltic Qualifier; Reykjavík, Iceland	Does not apply.			
5 October	2019 European Tour 2 – Nordic & Baltic Qualifier; Reykjavík, Iceland	Does not apply.			
6 October	2018 PDC Nordic & Baltic Tour 9 Reykjavík, Iceland	(Latvia) Madars Razma	(Sweden) Magnus Caris	(Finland) Kim Viljanen (Sweden) Dennis Nilsson	(Lithuania) Darius Labanauskas (Iceland) Ægir Björnsson (Sweden) Daniel Larsson (Finland) Ulf Ceder
6 October	2019 European Tour 3 – Nordic & Baltic Qualifier; Reykjavík, Iceland	Does not apply.			
7 October	2018 PDC Nordic & Baltic Tour 10 Reykjavík, Iceland	(Latvia) Madars Razma	(Finland) Marko Kantele	(Lithuania) Darius Labanauskas (Sweden) Magnus Caris	(Denmark) Niels Heinsøe (Finland) Kim Viljanen (Sweden) Daniel Larsson (Norway) Cor Dekker
11 October	2018 European Tour 13 – Host Nation Qualifier; Göttingen, Germany	Does not apply.			
12–14 October	2018 European Darts Trophy Göttingen, Germany	(Netherlands) Michael van Gerwen	(England) James Wade	(England) Michael Smith (England) Richard North	(Northern Ireland) Daryl Gurney (England) Dave Chisnall (Netherlands) Jelle Klaasen (England) Rob Cross
13 October	2018 PDC Asian Tour 11 Manila, Philippines	(Philippines) Lourence Ilagan	(Philippines) Val Capuyan	(Singapore) Paul Lim (Philippines) Noel Malicdem	(Japan) Eikishi Nakanishi (Philippines) Alexis Toylo (Philippines) Paolo Nebrida (Japan) Haruki Muramatsu
14 October	2018 PDC Asian Tour 12 Manila, Philippines	(Philippines) Noel Malicdem	(Singapore) Paul Lim	(Philippines) Lourence Ilagan (Philippines) Christian Perez	(Philippines) Benjie Domolog (Philippines) Christopher Salinas (Philippines) Jayson Langcao (Japan) Haruki Muramatsu
19 October	2018 World Series Finals Qualifier; Barnsley, England	Does not apply.			
20 October	2018 PDC Players Championship 21 Barnsley, England	(Poland) Krzysztof Ratajski	(England) Chris Dobey	(England) Steve Beaton (Germany) Martin Schindler	(Republic of Ireland) William O'Connor (England) Ricky Evans (England) Stephen Bunting (Austria) Mensur Suljović
21 October	2018 PDC Players Championship 22 Barnsley, England	(Poland) Krzysztof Ratajski	(England) Adrian Lewis	(England) Luke Humphries (Australia) Kyle Anderson	(England) James Wilson (England) James Wade (England) Michael Smith (Austria) Mensur Suljović
25–28 October	2018 European Championship Dortmund, Germany	(England) James Wade	(Australia) Simon Whitlock	(England) Joe Cullen (Germany) Max Hopp	(England) Steve West (England) Rob Cross (England) Darren Webster (Wales) Gerwyn Price

== November ==
Date	Tournament	Champions	Runners-up	Semi-finalists	Quarter-finalists
2–4 November	2018 World Series of Darts Finals Vienna, Austria	(England) James Wade	(England) Michael Smith	(Wales) Gerwyn Price (Netherlands) Raymond van Barneveld	(Australia) Simon Whitlock (England) Dave Chisnall (Wales) Jamie Lewis (Netherlands) Michael van Gerwen
3 November	2018 PDC Development Tour 17 Wigan, England	(England) Luke Humphries	(England) Bradley Brooks	(England) George Killington (Netherlands) Jeffrey de Zwaan	(Belgium) Mike De Decker (England) Ryan Meikle (Netherlands) Justin van Tergouw (Belgium) Brian Raman
3 November	2018 PDC Development Tour 18 Wigan, England	(Netherlands) Berry van Peer	(Netherlands) Geert Nentjes	(Netherlands) Niels Zonneveld (Republic of Ireland) Shane McGuirk	(Belgium) Brian Raman (England) Luke Humphries (Netherlands) Danny van Trijp (Belgium) Mike De Decker
4 November	2018 PDC Development Tour 19 Wigan, England	(Belgium) Dimitri Van den Bergh	(Netherlands) Geert Nentjes	(England) John Brown (Netherlands) Jimmy Hendriks	(Netherlands) Patrick van den Boogaard (England) Jack Male (Scotland) William Borland (England) Harry Ward
4 November	2018 PDC Development Tour 20 Wigan, England	(England) Ted Evetts	(Germany) Christian Bunse	(Netherlands) Berry van Peer (Netherlands) Jeffrey de Zwaan	(Hungary) Patrik Kovács (Netherlands) Danny van Trijp (Belgium) Dimitri Van den Bergh (England) Luke Humphries
10–18 November	2018 Grand Slam of Darts Wolverhampton, England	(Wales) Gerwyn Price	(Scotland) Gary Anderson	(Netherlands) Michael van Gerwen (Austria) Mensur Suljović	(Wales) Jonny Clayton (Germany) Michael Unterbuchner (Australia) Simon Whitlock (Belgium) Dimitri Van den Bergh
10 November	2018 PDC Challenge Tour 17 Peterborough, England	(England) David Evans	(Scotland) Ryan Murray	(England) Thomas Lovely (England) Andy Boulton	(England) Ted Evetts (England) Matthew Dennant (England) Martin Atkins (New Zealand) Cody Harris
10 November	2018 PDC Challenge Tour 18 Peterborough, England	(Wales) Jonathan Worsley	(New Zealand) Cody Harris	(Scotland) Darren Beveridge (Northern Ireland) Nathan Rafferty	(England) Mick Todd (England) David Evans (England) Patrick Lynskey (Scotland) Cameron Menzies
11 November	2018 PDC Challenge Tour 19 Peterborough, England	(Austria) Michael Rasztovits	(England) Andy Boulton	(Northern Ireland) Nathan Rafferty (England) Reece Robinson	(England) Michael Barnard (England) Barry Lynn (Republic of Ireland) Robert Smith (Scotland) Sean Ryan
11 November	2018 PDC Challenge Tour 20 Peterborough, England	(England) Ted Evetts	(England) David Evans	(Scotland) Darren Beveridge (England) Barry Lynn	(England) Michael Barnard (England) Nick Fullwell (England) Andy Boulton (England) Christopher Bent
23–25 November	2018 Players Championship Finals Minehead, England	(Northern Ireland) Daryl Gurney	(Netherlands) Michael van Gerwen	(Netherlands) Danny Noppert (Scotland) Gary Anderson	(England) Chris Dobey (England) Stephen Bunting (Wales) Jonny Clayton (Republic of Ireland) Steve Lennon
5 and 25 November	2018 PDC World Youth Championship Wigan and Minehead, England	(Belgium) Dimitri Van den Bergh	(Germany) Martin Schindler	(England) Callan Rydz (England) Ted Evetts	(England) Harry Ward (Netherlands) Geert Nentjes (Germany) Christian Bunse (England) Lee Budgen
26 November	2019 World Championship – PDPA Qualifier; Milton Keynes, England	Does not apply.			

== December ==
Date	Tournament	Champions	Runners-up	Semifinalists	Quarterfinalists
13 December–1 January	2019 PDC World Darts Championship London, England	(Netherlands) Michael van Gerwen	(England) Michael Smith	(Scotland) Gary Anderson (England) Nathan Aspinall	(England) Ryan Joyce (England) Dave Chisnall (England) Luke Humphries (Northern Ireland) Brendan Dolan

== See also ==
- List of players with a 2018 PDC Tour Card
- 2018 PDC Pro Tour
