= Michael Lacey =

Michael Lacey may refer to:

- Michael Lacey (mathematician) (born 1959), an American mathematician
- Michael Lacey (editor), American newspaper editor
- Michael Pearse Lacey (1916–2014), Canadian bishop
- Mick Lacey, Irish hurler

== See also ==
- Michael Rophino Lacy (1795–1867), Irish violinist and composer
