= 2022 PDC Asian Championship =

Tournament information
- Dates: 24–25 September 2022
- Venue: Fukuoka Convention Center
- Location: Fukuoka
- Country: Japan
- Organisation(s): PDC
- Format: Legs
- Prize fund: US$100,000
- Winner's share: US$15,000
- High checkout: 170 Paul Lim (Last 16)

Champion(s)
- Christian Perez

The 2022 PDC Asian Championship was a tournament organized by the Professional Darts Corporation for Asian players. The tournament featured 48 players from all around Asia, with the four semi-finalists earning a place in the 2023 PDC World Darts Championship and the winner also earning a place in the 2022 Grand Slam of Darts.

Christian Perez won the tournament, defeating Paolo Nebrida 7–5 in the final. Perez, Nebrida, plus semi-finalists Lourence Ilagan and Toru Suzuki all qualified for the World Championship as a result of this tournament, with Perez also qualifying for the Grand Slam, becoming only the second Asian player after Mikuru Suzuki to do so.

This was the first edition of the tournament, which was created following the inability to revive the successful PDC Asian Tour, which had not been able to be run since 2019, owing to the COVID-19 pandemic.

== Match Format ==
Round	Best of (legs)
Asian Series Qualifiers	7
Round Robin Stage	9
Last 16	9
Quarter-finals	11
Semi-finals	11
Final	13

== Prize money ==
The total prize fund will be US$100,000. The four semi-finalists of the tournament will earn a place in the 2023 PDC World Darts Championship and the winner will earn a place in the 2022 Grand Slam of Darts as well.

Position (no. of players)		Prize money (Total: US$100,000)
Winner	(1)	US$15,000
Runner-up	(1)	US$7,000
Semi-finalists	(2)	US$5,000
Quarter-finalists	(4)	US$3,000
Last 16	(8)	US$2,000
Second in Group	(16)	US$1,500
Third in Group	(16)	US$1,000

== Qualifiers ==
Asian Series Qualifiers
Event 1
- (Philippines) Raymond Copano
- (Japan) Jun Matsuda
- (Japan) Seigo Asada
- (Japan) Takayuki Masatsu

Event 2
- (Japan) Keita Ono
- (Japan) Edward Foulkes
- (Japan) Yutaka Sunakawa
- (Japan) Yuichiro Ogawa

Event 3
- (Philippines) Alain Abiabi
- (Japan) Ryuki Morikubo
- (Japan) Yuki Yamada
- (Japan) Teppei Nishi

Event 4
- (Japan) Sho Katsumi
- (Japan) Kota Suzuki
- (Mongolia) Gan-Erdene Sharavsambuu
- (Hong Kong) Royden Lam

Asian Series Order of Merit Qualifiers
- (Japan) Tomoya Tsumura
- (Japan) Shingo Enomata
- (Japan) Mikuru Suzuki
- (Taiwan) Teng Lieh Pupo
- (Japan) Yoshihisa Baba
- (Philippines) Paolo Nebrida
- (Japan) Ryusei Azemoto
- (Mongolia) Enkhbold Surenjav
- (Japan) Ao Ishihara
- (Japan) Akito Yamagata
Regional Qualifiers
- (Bahrain) Basem Mohamed
- (China) Zhiwei Lin
- (India) Mohd Adbul Mannan Syed
- (Macau) Kam Weng Cheng
- (Malaysia) Jenn Ming Tan
- (Mongolia) Purevloov Tungalag
- (South Korea) Yong-Seok Kim
- (Taiwan) Yan-Bin Chen
- (Thailand) Chaiyan Paiaree
- (United Arab Emirates) Hussain Nadir Ali

2022 PDC World Cup of Darts Participants
- (Hong Kong) Lok Yin Lee
- (Hong Kong) Ho Tung Ching
- (Japan) Toru Suzuki
- (Japan) Tomoya Goto
- (Philippines) Lourence Ilagan
- (Philippines) RJ Escaros
- (Singapore) Paul Lim
- (Singapore) Harith Lim
Qualifiers From World Cup of Darts Nations
- (Hong Kong) Man Lok Leung
- (Japan) Mitsuhiko Tatsunami
- (Philippines) Christian Perez
- (Singapore) Zhao Chen Tay

== Draw ==
=== Group stage ===
All group matches are best of nine legs
Only winners in each group qualify for the knock-out stage

NB: P = Played; W = Won; L = Lost; LF = Legs for; LA = Legs against; +/− = Plus/minus record, in relation to legs; AVG = mean average; Pts = Points; Status = Qualified to knockout stage

==== Group A ====
Standings Table
Pos.	Player	P	W	L	LF	LA	+/−	AVG	Pts	Status
1	Yong-Seok Kim	2	1	1	8	7	+1	71.35	2	Q
2	Takayuki Masatsu	2	1	1	7	7	0	73.27	2	
3	Kam Weng Cheng	2	1	1	7	8	–1	74.49	2	

24 September

Yong-Seok Kim 71.94	5 – 2	Takayuki Masatsu 66.68
Kam Weng Cheng 78.38	2 – 5	Takayuki Masatsu 79.86
Kam Weng Cheng 70.60	5 – 3	Yong-Seok Kim 70.76

==== Group B ====
Standings Table
Pos.	Player	P	W	L	LF	LA	+/−	AVG	Pts	Status
1	Paul Lim	2	2	0	10	4	+6	85.70	4	Q
2	Keita Ono	2	1	1	9	9	0	82.87	2	
3	Man Lok Leung	2	0	2	4	10	–6	82.94	0	

24 September

Paul Lim 88.41	5 – 0	Man Lok Leung 78.41
Keita Ono 86.11	5 – 4	Man Lok Leung 87.46
Keita Ono 79.62	4 – 5	Paul Lim 82.99

==== Group C ====
Standings Table
Pos.	Player	P	W	L	LF	LA	+/−	AVG	Pts	Status
1	RJ Escaros	2	2	0	10	4	+6	84.46	4	Q
2	Royden Lam	2	1	1	7	6	+1	81.33	2	
3	Yan-Bin Chen	2	0	2	3	10	–7	75.82	0	

24 September

Royden Lam 80.41	5 – 1	Yan-Bin Chen 71.19
RJ Escaros 82.01	5 – 2	Yan-Bin Chen 80.44
RJ Escaros 86.90	5 – 2	Royden Lam 82.24

==== Group D ====
Standings Table
Pos.	Player	P	W	L	LF	LA	+/−	AVG	Pts	Status
1	Chaiyan Paiaree	2	1	1	9	7	+2	83.47	2	Q
2	Gan-Erdene Sharavsambuu	2	1	1	7	8	–1	76.91	2	
3	Ho Tung Ching	2	1	1	8	9	–1	77.87	2	

24 September

Ho Tung Ching 76.34	5 – 4	Chaiyan Paiaree 86.65
Gan-Erdene Sharavsambuu 76.08	2 – 5	Chaiyan Paiaree 80.29
Gan-Erdene Sharavsambuu 77.74	5 – 3	Ho Tung Ching 79.39

==== Group E ====
Standings Table
Pos.	Player	P	W	L	LF	LA	+/−	AVG	Pts	Status
1	Akito Yamagata	2	1	1	9	7	+2	71.89	2	Q
2	Jenn Ming Tan	2	1	1	9	9	0	81.16	2	
3	Enkhbold Surenjav	2	1	1	7	9	–2	66.44	2	

24 September

Akito Yamagata 69.89	5 – 2	Enkhbold Surenjav 64.46
Jenn Ming Tan 78.78	4 – 5	Enkhbold Surenjav 68.42
Jenn Ming Tan 83.53	5 – 4	Akito Yamagata 73.88

==== Group F ====
Standings Table
Pos.	Player	P	W	L	LF	LA	+/−	AVG	Pts	Status
1	Jun Matsuda	2	2	0	10	3	+7	79.98	4	Q
2	Edward Foulkes	2	1	1	7	8	–1	79.23	2	
3	Zhiwei Lin	2	0	2	4	10	–6	71.07	0	

24 September

Edward Foulkes 77.90	5 – 3	Zhiwei Lin 70.29
Jun Matsuda 74.03	5 – 1	Zhiwei Lin 71.84
Jun Matsuda 85.92	5 – 2	Edward Foulkes 80.55

==== Group G ====
Standings Table
Pos.	Player	P	W	L	LF	LA	+/−	AVG	Pts	Status
1	Paolo Nebrida	2	2	0	10	6	+4	75.46	4	Q
2	Ryuki Morikubo	2	1	1	9	5	+4	83.50	2	
3	Kota Suzuki	2	0	2	2	10	–8	74.55	0	

24 September

Paolo Nebrida 72.75	5 – 2	Kota Suzuki 76.54
Ryuki Morikubo 89.46	5 – 0	Kota Suzuki 72.56
Ryuki Morikubo 77.53	4 – 5	Paolo Nebrida 78.16

==== Group H ====
Standings Table
Pos.	Player	P	W	L	LF	LA	+/−	AVG	Pts	Status
1	Christian Perez	2	2	0	10	3	+7	79.96	4	Q
2	Basem Mohamed	2	1	1	6	8	–2	72.54	2	
3	Seigo Asada	2	0	2	5	10	–5	83.31	0	

24 September

Christian Perez 80.89	5 – 1	Basem Mohamed 66.03
Seigo Asada 88.34	3 – 5	Basem Mohamed 79.04
Seigo Asada 78.28	2 – 5	Christian Perez 79.02

==== Group I ====
Standings Table
Pos.	Player	P	W	L	LF	LA	+/−	AVG	Pts	Status
1	Yuichiro Ogawa	2	1	1	9	5	+4	78.15	2	Q
2	Hussain Nadir Ali	2	1	1	9	9	0	76.61	2	
3	Mikuru Suzuki	2	1	1	5	9	–4	69.79	2	

24 September

Mikuru Suzuki 77.01	5 – 4	Hussain Nadir Ali 76.65
Hussain Nadir Ali 76.57	5 – 4	Yuichiro Ogawa 71.85
Yuichiro Ogawa 84.44	5 – 0	Mikuru Suzuki 62.57

==== Group J ====
Standings Table
Pos.	Player	P	W	L	LF	LA	+/−	AVG	Pts	Status
1	Yoshihisa Baba	2	2	0	10	2	+8	96.31	4	Q
2	Harith Lim	2	1	1	7	9	–2	84.18	2	
3	Ao Ishihara	2	0	2	4	10	–6	78.86	0	

24 September

Yoshihisa Baba 104.38	5 – 0	Ao Ishihara 78.48
Harith Lim 81.70	5 – 4	Ao Ishihara 79.24
Yoshihisa Baba 88.24	5 – 2	Harith Lim 86.65

==== Group K ====
Standings Table
Pos.	Player	P	W	L	LF	LA	+/−	AVG	Pts	Status
1	Yuki Yamada	2	2	0	10	4	+6	87.94	4	Q
2	Sho Katsumi	2	1	1	8	6	+2	79.67	2	
3	Raymond Copano	2	0	2	2	10	–8	78.72	0	

24 September

Yuki Yamada 86.00	5 – 3	Sho Katsumi 80.76
Sho Katsumi 78.58	5 – 1	Raymond Copano 75.55
Yuki Yamada 89.88	5 – 1	Raymond Copano 81.88

==== Group L ====
Standings Table
Pos.	Player	P	W	L	LF	LA	+/−	AVG	Pts	Status
1	Alain Abiabi	2	2	0	10	4	+6	85.73	4	Q
2	Teppei Nishi	2	1	1	8	7	+1	80.12	2	
3	Tomoya Tsumura	2	0	2	3	10	–7	75.19	0	

24 September

Alain Abiabi 88.42	5 – 3	Teppei Nishi 79.23
Teppei Nishi 81.00	5 – 2	Tomoya Tsumura 74.78
Alain Abiabi 83.04	5 – 1	Tomoya Tsumura 75.59

==== Group M ====
Standings Table
Pos.	Player	P	W	L	LF	LA	+/−	AVG	Pts	Status
1	Lok Yin Lee	2	2	0	10	4	+6	81.23	4	Q
2	Tomoya Goto	2	1	1	7	5	+2	74.20	2	
3	Purevloov Tungalag	2	0	2	2	10	–8	66.90	0	

24 September

Lok Yin Lee 87.63	5 – 2	Tomoya Goto 76.82
Tomoya Goto 71.57	5 – 0	Purevloov Tungalag 64.15
Lok Yin Lee 74.83	5 – 2	Purevloov Tungalag 69.65

==== Group N ====
Standings Table
Pos.	Player	P	W	L	LF	LA	+/−	AVG	Pts	Status
1	Lourence Ilagan	2	1	1	8	6	+2	96.96	2	Q
2	Shingo Enomata	2	1	1	7	8	–1	89.46	2	
3	Mitsuhiko Tatsunami	2	1	1	6	7	–1	83.94	2	

24 September

Lourence Ilagan 98.83	5 – 1	Mitsuhiko Tatsunami 82.01
Mitsuhiko Tatsunami 85.94	5 – 2	Shingo Enomata 83.65
Shingo Enomata 95.26	5 – 3	Lourence Ilagan 95.08

==== Group O ====
Standings Table
Pos.	Player	P	W	L	LF	LA	+/−	AVG	Pts	Status
1	Toru Suzuki	2	2	0	10	2	+8	76.13	4	Q
2	Teng Lieh Pupo	2	1	1	7	5	+2	75.56	2	
3	Mohd Abdul Mannan Syed	2	0	2	0	10	–10	57.81	0	

24 September

Toru Suzuki 75.15	5 – 0	Mohd Abdul Mannan Syed 52.30
Teng Lieh Pupo 79.11	5 – 0	Mohd Abdul Mannan Syed 63.31
Toru Suzuki 77.10	5 – 2	Teng Lieh Pupo 72.00

==== Group P ====
Standings Table
Pos.	Player	P	W	L	LF	LA	+/−	AVG	Pts	Status
1	Yutaka Sunakawa	2	2	0	10	6	+4	79.29	4	Q
2	Ryusei Azemoto	2	1	1	9	7	+2	76.71	2	
3	Zhao Chen Tay	2	0	2	4	10	–6	66.14	0	

24 September

Yutaka Sunakawa 78.02	5 – 2	Zhao Chen Tay 66.89
Ryusei Azemoto 77.12	5 – 2	Zhao Chen Tay 65.39
Yutaka Sunakawa 80.56	5 – 4	Ryusei Azemoto 76.29

=== Knockout stage ===
Last 16 (best of 9 legs); 24 September
E1	Akito Yamagata 77.34	1
I1	Yuichiro Ogawa 79.79	5
N1	Lourence Ilagan 83.50	5
D1	Chaiyan Paiaree 72.83	0
H1	Christian Perez 93.24	5
C1	RJ Escaros 84.29	2
J1	Yoshihisa Baba 78.32	5
L1	Alain Abiabi 76.02	2
A1	Yong-Seok Kim 65.24	1
K1	Yuki Yamada 82.62	5
O1	Toru Suzuki 92.91	5
B1	Paul Lim 93.70	4
G1	Paolo Nebrida 79.72	5
M1	Lok Yin Lee 82.24	4
P1	Yutaka Sunakawa 79.72	0
F1	Jun Matsuda 96.35	5

Quarter-finals (best of 11 legs); 25 September
I1	Yuichiro Ogawa 70.62	4
N1	Lourence Ilagan 74.13	6
H1	Christian Perez 84.77	6
J1	Yoshihisa Baba 78.02	5
K1	Yuki Yamada 82.14	5
O1	Toru Suzuki 78.57	6
G1	Paolo Nebrida 90.03	6
F1	Jun Matsuda 85.00	1

Semi-finals (best of 11 legs); 25 September
N1	Lourence Ilagan 77.14	1
H1	Christian Perez 91.75	6
O1	Toru Suzuki 73.65	3
G1	Paolo Nebrida 86.80	6

Final (best of 13 legs); 25 September
H1	Christian Perez 83.52	7
G1	Paolo Nebrida 83.95	5

== Statistics ==
=== Top averages ===
This table shows the highest averages achieved by players throughout the tournament.

#	Player	Round	Average	Result
1	Yoshihisa Baba	Group J	104.38	Won
2	Lourence Ilagan	Group N	98.83	Won
3	Jun Matsuda	Last 16	96.35	Won
4	Shingo Enomata	Group N	95.26	Won
5	Lourence Ilagan	Group N	95.08	Lost
6	Paul Lim	Last 16	93.70	Lost
7	Christian Perez	Last 16	93.24	Won
8	Toru Suzuki	Last 16	92.91	Won
9	Christian Perez	SF	91.75	Won
10	Paolo Nebrida	QF	90.03	Won
