= 2018 International Darts Open =

Tournament information
- Dates: 14–16 September 2018
- Venue: SACHSENarena
- Location: Riesa
- Country: Germany
- Organisation(s): PDC
- Format: Legs
- Prize fund: £135,000
- Winner's share: £25,000
- High checkout: 170 (Germany) Martin Schindler (third round)

Champion(s)
- (Wales) Gerwyn Price

The 2018 International Darts Open was the twelfth of thirteen PDC European Tour events on the 2018 PDC Pro Tour. The tournament took place at the SACHSENarena, Riesa, Germany from 14–16 September 2018. It featured a field of 48 players and £135,000 in prize money, with £25,000 going to the winner.

Peter Wright was the defending champion after defeating Kim Huybrechts 6–5 in last year's final, but he was defeated 6–4 by Ryan Searle in the second round.

Gerwyn Price won his first European Tour title by beating Simon Whitlock 8–3 in the final. This tournament was also the first in European Tour history in which none of the top 4 seeds reached the quarter-finals.

== Prize money ==
This is how the prize money is divided:

Stage (num. of players)		Prize money
Winner	(1)	£25,000
Runner-up	(1)	£10,000
Semi-finalists	(2)	£6,000
Quarter-finalists	(4)	£4,000
Third round losers	(8)	£3,000
Second round losers	(16)	£2,000
First round losers	(16)	£1,000
Total	£135,000	

Prize money will count towards the PDC Order of Merit, the ProTour Order of Merit and the European Tour Order of Merit, with one exception: should a seeded player lose in the second round (last 32), their prize money will not count towards any Orders of Merit, although they still receive the full prize money payment.

== Qualification and format ==
The top 16 entrants from the PDC ProTour Order of Merit on 30 August will automatically qualify for the event and will be seeded in the second round.

The remaining 32 places will go to players from five qualifying events – 18 from the UK Qualifier (held in Barnsley on 3 September), eight from the West/South European Qualifier (held on 13 September), four from the Host Nation Qualifier (held on 13 September), one from the Nordic & Baltic Qualifier (held on 10 August) and one from the East European Qualifier (held on 26 August).

The following players will take part in the tournament:

Top 16
1. (Scotland) Peter Wright (second round)
2. (Austria) Mensur Suljović (third round)
3. (England) Ian White (third round)
4. (Wales) Jonny Clayton (third round)
5. (England) Adrian Lewis (quarter-finals)
6. (Australia) Simon Whitlock (runner-up)
7. (England) Joe Cullen (third round)
8. (Northern Ireland) Daryl Gurney (third round)
9. (Wales) Gerwyn Price (champion)
10. (England) Darren Webster (quarter-finals)
11. (Germany) Max Hopp (second round)
12. (England) Stephen Bunting (third round)
13. (England) Mervyn King (second round)
14. (England) Dave Chisnall (second round)
15. (Netherlands) Jermaine Wattimena (second round)
16. (Belgium) Kim Huybrechts (second round)

UK Qualifier
- (England) Steve West (semi-finals)
- (England) Steve Beaton (third round)
- (England) James Wilson (second round)
- (Scotland) John Henderson (second round)
- (England) Ross Smith (second round)
- (Republic of Ireland) Steve Lennon (second round)
- (England) Barry Lynn (second round)
- (Australia) Kyle Anderson (first round)
- (England) Ryan Searle (quarter-finals)
- (Canada) Dawson Murschell (first round)
- (England) Matthew Dennant (first round)
- (England) Terry Jenkins (second round)
- (England) Terry Temple (first round)
- (Northern Ireland) Mickey Mansell (second round)
- (England) Ryan Joyce (second round)
- (Scotland) Robert Thornton (first round)
- (England) James Richardson (quarter-finals)
- (England) Adam Huckvale (first round)

West/South European Qualifier
- (Netherlands) Dirk van Duijvenbode (first round)
- (Netherlands) Ron Meulenkamp (first round)
- (Spain) José Justicia (first round)
- (Netherlands) Jan Dekker (first round)
- (Netherlands) Michael Plooy (first round)
- (Netherlands) Vincent van der Voort (first round)
- (Netherlands) Jelle Klaasen (second round)
- (Netherlands) Danny Noppert (semi-finals)

Host Nation Qualifier
- (Germany) Gabriel Clemens (first round)
- (Germany) Robert Marijanović (second round)
- (Germany) Ricardo Pietreczko (first round)
- (Germany) Martin Schindler (third round)

Nordic & Baltic Qualifier
- (Sweden) Magnus Caris (first round)

East European Qualifier
- (Hungary) Patrik Kovács (first round)

== Draw ==
First round (best of 11 legs); 14 September
(Germany) Ricardo Pietreczko 83.80	4
(England) Ryan Searle 87.53	6
(Netherlands) Ron Meulenkamp 96.50	3
(Germany) Martin Schindler 97.24	6
(Germany) Robert Marijanović 100.63	6
(Netherlands) Jan Dekker 92.76	4
(Sweden) Magnus Caris 84.24	2
(Scotland) John Henderson 91.80	6
(England) Terry Jenkins 82.18	6
(England) Matthew Dennant 82.14	2
(England) Barry Lynn 91.74	6
(Canada) Dawson Murschell 89.11	3
(Republic of Ireland) Steve Lennon 94.11	6
(Hungary) Patrik Kovács 73.14	1
(Netherlands) Michael Plooy 93.61	5
(England) Steve West 95.45	6
(England) Ryan Joyce 93.64	6
(Germany) Gabriel Clemens 95.33	5
(Scotland) Robert Thornton 77.85	0
(Netherlands) Danny Noppert 88.41	6
(England) Ross Smith 90.89	6
(Australia) Kyle Anderson 88.89	3
(Netherlands) Dirk van Duijvenbode 78.73	0
(Northern Ireland) Mickey Mansell 96.97	6
(England) James Wilson 90.37	6
(England) Adam Huckvale 86.31	4
(England) Steve Beaton 94.35	6
(Netherlands) Vincent van der Voort 90.30	5
(Spain) José Justicia 80.28	0
(Netherlands) Jelle Klaasen 89.29	6
(England) Terry Temple 90.02	3
(England) James Richardson 89.81	6

Second round (best of 11 legs); 15 September
1	(Scotland) Peter Wright 96.78	4
(England) Ryan Searle 94.45	6
16	(Belgium) Kim Huybrechts 84.09	1
(Germany) Martin Schindler 96.43	6
8	(Northern Ireland) Daryl Gurney 95.68	6
(Germany) Robert Marijanović 90.74	2
9	(Wales) Gerwyn Price 95.69	6
(Scotland) John Henderson 84.84	3
5	(England) Adrian Lewis 94.93	6
(England) Terry Jenkins 80.70	0
12	(England) Stephen Bunting 96.96	6
(England) Barry Lynn 83.10	3
4	(Wales) Jonny Clayton 95.54	6
(Republic of Ireland) Steve Lennon 93.17	5
13	(England) Mervyn King 97.99	1
(England) Steve West 111.29	6
2	(Austria) Mensur Suljović 96.78	6
(England) Ryan Joyce 97.60	5
15	(Netherlands) Jermaine Wattimena 82.46	2
(Netherlands) Danny Noppert 93.07	6
7	(England) Joe Cullen 95.86	6
(England) Ross Smith 98.67	3
10	(England) Darren Webster 88.21	6
(Northern Ireland) Mickey Mansell 85.79	4
6	(Australia) Simon Whitlock 91.56	6
(England) James Wilson 93.00	5
11	(Germany) Max Hopp 90.41	5
(England) Steve Beaton 93.52	6
3	(England) Ian White 108.17	6
(Netherlands) Jelle Klaasen 93.88	2
14	(England) Dave Chisnall 92.64	4
(England) James Richardson 92.84	6

Third round (best of 11 legs); 16 September
(England) Searle 95.88	6
(Germany) Schindler 96.58	3
8	(Northern Ireland) Gurney 93.30	5
9	(Wales) Price 92.70	6
5	(England) Lewis 90.89	6
12	(England) Bunting 86.06	2
4	(Wales) Clayton 101.47	5
(England) West 95.37	6
2	(Austria) Suljović 86.72	4
(Netherlands) Noppert 89.38	6
7	(England) Cullen 93.83	5
10	(England) Webster 99.14	6
6	(Australia) Whitlock 102.41	6
(England) Beaton 99.93	3
3	(England) White 100.06	4
(England) Richardson 96.61	6

Quarter-finals (best of 11 legs); 16 September
(England) Searle 90.11	2
9	(Wales) Price 101.63	6
5	(England) Lewis 98.13	4
(England) West 97.18	6
(Netherlands) Noppert 87.96	6
10	(England) Webster 87.27	5
6	(Australia) Whitlock 88.11	6
(England) Richardson 89.47	5

Semi-finals (best of 13 legs); 16 September
9	(Wales) Price 92.81	7
(England) West 95.56	6
(Netherlands) Noppert 87.88	2
6	(Australia) Whitlock 94.72	7

Final (best of 15 legs); 16 September
9	(Wales) Price 98.26	8
6	(Australia) Whitlock 88.50	3
