= 2016 UK Open =

2016 Coral UK Open

Tournament information
- Dates: 4–6 March 2016
- Venue: Butlin's Minehead
- Location: Minehead, England
- Organisation(s): Professional Darts Corporation (PDC)
- Format: Legs; Final – best of 21
- Prize fund: £300,000
- Winner's share: £60,000
- Nine-dart finish: Michael van Gerwen
- High checkout: 170; Michael van Gerwen (×4); Alan Norris; Jamie Caven

Champion(s)
- (Netherlands) Michael van Gerwen

The 2016 Coral UK Open was a darts tournament staged by the Professional Darts Corporation. It was the fourteenth year of the tournament where, following numerous regional qualifying heats throughout Britain, players competing in a single elimination tournament to be crowned champion. The tournament was held for the third time at the Butlin's Resort in Minehead, England, from 4 to 6 March 2016, and has the nickname, "the FA Cup of darts" as a random draw will be staged after each round until the final.

In a repeat of last year's final, Michael van Gerwen beat Peter Wright to retain his title. During the tournament, he also hit a nine-dart finish against the then-unknown Rob Cross in the fourth round. Either side of that leg, he hit a 170 checkout, which also included a run of 19 perfect darts (treble 19, 2x treble 20, treble 19, 170 checkout (2x treble 20, bull), 9-dart leg (7x treble 20, treble 19, double 12), 2x treble 20, treble 19).

== Format and qualifiers ==
=== UK Open qualifiers ===
There were six qualifying events staged in February 2016 to determine the UK Open Order of Merit Table. The tournament winners were:

No.	Date	Venue	Winner	Score	Runner-up	Ref.
1	Friday 5 February	Robin Park Tennis Centre, Wigan	Adrian Lewis (England)	6–1	(England) Phil Taylor	
2	Saturday 6 February	Robin Park Tennis Centre, Wigan	Michael van Gerwen (Netherlands)	6–4	(England) Alan Norris	
3	Sunday 7 February	Robin Park Tennis Centre, Wigan	Phil Taylor (England)	6–2	(Netherlands) Michael van Gerwen	
4	Friday 19 February	Robin Park Tennis Centre, Wigan	Gary Anderson (Scotland)	6–1	(England) James Wade	
5	Saturday 20 February	Robin Park Tennis Centre, Wigan	Michael van Gerwen (Netherlands)	6–2	(Wales) Gerwyn Price	
6	Sunday 21 February	Robin Park Tennis Centre, Wigan	Michael van Gerwen (Netherlands)	6–2	(England) Steve Beaton	

The tournament featured 128 players. The results of the six qualifiers shown above were collated into the UK Open Order Of Merit. The top 32 players in the Order of Merit received a place at the final tournament. In addition, the next 64 players (without ties in this year's edition) in the Order of Merit list qualified for the tournament, but started in the earlier rounds played on the Friday. A further 32 players qualify via regional qualifying tournaments.

=== Top 32 in Order of Merit (receiving byes into third round) ===
1. (Netherlands) Michael van Gerwen
2. (England) Phil Taylor
3. (England) Adrian Lewis
4. (Scotland) Gary Anderson
5. (Wales) Mark Webster
6. (England) Steve Beaton
7. (Australia) Simon Whitlock
8. (England) Alan Norris
9. (England) James Wade
10. (England) Ian White
11. (Wales) Gerwyn Price
12. (Netherlands) Benito van de Pas
13. (England) Michael Smith
14. (England) Terry Jenkins
15. (Netherlands) Jelle Klaasen
16. (Austria) Mensur Suljović
17. (Scotland) John Henderson
18. (England) Dave Chisnall
19. (Belgium) Kim Huybrechts
20. (Northern Ireland) Daryl Gurney
21. (England) Mervyn King
22. (Scotland) Peter Wright
23. (England) Stephen Bunting
24. (Netherlands) Vincent van der Voort
25. (Wales) Jamie Lewis
26. (Australia) Kyle Anderson
27. (Netherlands) Raymond van Barneveld
28. (England) Justin Pipe
29. (England) Ricky Evans
30. (England) Andy Hamilton
31. (Germany) René Eidams
32. (England) Joe Cullen

=== Number 33–64 of the Order of Merit (receiving byes into second round) ===
33. (England) Andrew Gilding
34. (England) Lee Evans
35. (England) Jay Foreman
36. (Netherlands) Jeffrey de Graaf
37. (England) David Pallett
38. (England) Peter Hudson
39. (England) Tony Newell
40. (England) Scott Dale
41. (Netherlands) Yordi Meeuwisse
42. (Netherlands) Berry van Peer
43. (Austria) Rowby-John Rodriguez
44. (England) Matthew Edgar
45. (Belgium) Mike De Decker
46. (England) Wayne Jones
47. (England) Robbie Green
48. (England) Jamie Caven
49. (England) Kevin Painter
50. (England) Matt Clark
51. (Scotland) Robert Thornton
52. (England) Jason Marriott
53. (England) Brett Claydon
54. (England) Darron Brown
55. (England) James Wilson
56. (Northern Ireland) Brendan Dolan
57. (Spain) Cristo Reyes
58. (Netherlands) Jeffrey de Zwaan
59. (England) Ritchie Edhouse
60. (England) Mark Dudbridge
61. (England) Stuart Kellett
62. (England) Andy Jenkins
63. (Netherlands) Joey ten Berge
64. (England) Richie Corner

=== Number 65–96 of the Order of Merit qualifiers (starting in first round) ===
65. (England) Darren Webster
66. (Belgium) Ronny Huybrechts
67. (England) Andy Boulton
68. (Netherlands) Jan Dekker
69. (Republic of Ireland) Mick McGowan
70. (Netherlands) Ryan de Vreede
71. (England) Joe Murnan
72. (England) Alan Tabern
73. (England) Dennis Smith
74. (Republic of Ireland) William O'Connor
75. (Netherlands) Jermaine Wattimena
76. (England) Nathan Derry
77. (England) Josh Payne
78. (England) Ryan Harrington
79. (England) Harry Ward
80. (England) Mark Frost
81. (Sweden) Magnus Caris
82. (England) Arron Monk
83. (Scotland) Mark Barilli
84. (England) Dean Winstanley
85. (England) Wes Newton
86. (England) Andy Smith
87. (England) Nathan Aspinall
88. (England) Paul Milford
89. (Netherlands) Dick van Dijk
90. (Wales) Jonathan Worsley
91. (England) Kevin Dowling
92. (Canada) Ken MacNeil
93. (England) Johnny Haines
94. (Netherlands) Dirk van Duijvenbode
95. (Wales) Jonny Clayton
96. (Scotland) Gary Stone

=== Riley qualifiers (starting in first round) ===
32 amateur players qualified from Riley qualifiers held across the UK.

- (England) Mark Jodrill
- (England) Paul Hogan
- (England) Jason Mold
- (England) Dean Stewart
- (England) Mark Cox
- (England) Paul Whitworth
- (England) Chris Jones
- (England) Mark Rice
- (England) Michael McFall
- (England) Curtis Turner
- (England) Dave Parletti
- (Scotland) Jason Hogg
- (England) Lee Morris
- (England) Daniel Day
- (England) Scott Marsh
- (England) Ian McFarlane
- (Scotland) Stewart Rattray
- (England) Darren Layden
- (England) Steven Rose
- (England) Alex Roy
- (England) John Scott
- (Scotland) Andrew Davidson
- (England) Les Delderfield
- (England) Rob Cross
- (England) Mark Wilson
- (England) Andy Brown
- (Scotland) Glen McGrandle
- (England) Steve Maish
- (England) Lee Grimshaw
- (England) Jason Heaver
- (England) Barry Lynn
- (England) Ben Green

== Prize money ==
The prize fund remained like last year's edition prize fund at £300,000.

Stage (no. of players)		Prize money (Total: £300,000)
Winner	(1)	£60,000
Runner-up	(1)	£30,000
Semi-finalists	(2)	£17,000
Quarter-finalists	(4)	£10,000
Last 16 (fifth round)	(8)	£5,000
Last 32 (fourth round)	(16)	£3,000
Last 64 (third round)	(32)	£1,500
Last 96 (second round)	(32)	n/a
Last 128 (first round)	(32)	n/a
Nine-dart finish	(1)	£10,000

== Draw ==
=== Friday 4 March ===
==== First round (best of eleven legs) ====
Player	Score	Player	Player	Score	Player
(England) Wes Newton	6 – 4	(England) Mark Cox (Q)	(Belgium) Ronny Huybrechts	6 – 3	(England) Mark Rice (Q)
(England) Dennis Smith	1 – 6	(England) Alex Roy (Q)	(Netherlands) Jermaine Wattimena	6 – 5	(England) Andy Smith
(England) Andy Boulton	6 – 4	(England) Lee Grimshaw (Q)	(Republic of Ireland) William O'Connor	6 – 1	(England) Mark Jodrill (Q)
(Sweden) Magnus Caris	6 – 5	(England) Jason Mold (Q)	(Republic of Ireland) Mick McGowan	4 – 6	(England) Nathan Aspinall
(Netherlands) Dick van Dijk	2 – 6	(England) Kevin Dowling	(Wales) Jonathan Worsley	6 – 1	(England) Curtis Turner (Q)
(England) Arron Monk	6 – 3	(Scotland) Stewart Rattray (Q)	(England) Dean Stewart (Q)	4 – 6	(England) Barry Lynn (Q)
(Netherlands) Dirk van Duijvenbode	6 – 3	(England) Michael McFall (Q)	(Scotland) Jason Hogg (Q) (timed out)	w/o	(England) Ben Green (Q)
(England) Alan Tabern	3 – 6	(England) Harry Ward	(England) Paul Hogan (Q)	6 – 3	(England) Daniel Day (Q)
(Scotland) Mark Barilli	6 – 1	(England) Darren Layden (Q)	(Wales) Jonny Clayton	6 – 2	(England) Ian McFarlane (Q)
(Netherlands) Ryan de Vreede	6 – 3	(England) Nathan Derry	(England) Darren Webster	6 – 0	(England) Lee Morris (Q)
(England) Mark Frost	6 – 0	(England) Andy Brown (Q)	(England) Joe Murnan	6 – 2	(England) Paul Whitworth (Q)
(Netherlands) Jan Dekker	5 – 6	(Scotland) Andrew Davidson (Q)	(England) Steve Maish (Q)	6 – 5	(England) Jason Heaver (Q)
(England) Dean Winstanley	6 – 5	(England) John Scott (Q)	(England) Mark Wilson (Q)	w/o	(England) Les Delderfield (Q) (timed out)
(England) Paul Milford	6 – 1	(England) Chris Jones (Q)	(England) Scott Marsh (Q)	6 – 1	(England) Steven Rose (Q)
(England) Johnny Haines	5 – 6	(Scotland) Gary Stone	(Canada) Ken MacNeil	3 – 6	(England) Rob Cross (Q)
(England) Ryan Harrington	6 – 1	(Scotland) Glen McGrandle (Q)	(England) Josh Payne	6 – 2	(England) Dave Parletti (Q)

==== Second round (best of eleven legs) ====
Player	Score	Player	Player	Score	Player
Jeffrey de Graaf	6 – 5	William O'Connor	Lee Evans	6 – 2	Rowby-John Rodriguez
Robert Thornton	4 – 6	Arron Monk	Kevin Painter	4 – 6	Dean Winstanley
Mike De Decker	5 – 6	Matt Clark	Mark Dudbridge	5 – 6	Joey ten Berge
Brendan Dolan	6 – 3	(England) Scott Marsh (Q)	(England) Darron Brown	4 – 6	(England) Ryan Harrington
Jamie Caven	6 – 2	Gary Stone	Mark Frost	6 – 4	(Scotland) Mark Barilli
(Netherlands) Yordi Meeuwisse	3 – 6	Robbie Green	(England) Jay Foreman	4 – 6	Ronny Huybrechts
Wayne Jones	5 – 6	Andy Jenkins	(England) Paul Milford	4 – 6	(England) Steve Maish (Q)
Josh Payne	6 – 1	Harry Ward	(England) Scott Dale	2 – 6	Darren Webster
Berry van Peer	5 – 6	(England) Richie Corner	Jeffrey de Zwaan	5 – 6	(England) Alex Roy (Q)
Brett Claydon	4 – 6	Barry Lynn (Q)	Cristo Reyes	4 – 6	(Scotland) Andrew Davidson (Q)
Matthew Edgar	6 – 4	(England) Mark Wilson (Q)	David Pallett	6 – 1	(England) Jason Marriott
James Wilson	6 – 3	Jonny Clayton	Wes Newton	4 – 6	Rob Cross (Q)
Ritchie Edhouse	4 – 6	Joe Murnan	Peter Hudson	4 – 6	Dirk van Duijvenbode
Jermaine Wattimena	6 – 1	Kevin Dowling	(Sweden) Magnus Caris	6 – 3	(England) Ben Green (Q)
Andy Boulton	6 – 2	Jonathan Worsley	Andrew Gilding	5 – 6	Ryan de Vreede
(England) Tony Newell	6 – 1	Paul Hogan (Q)	Stuart Kellett	6 – 5	Nathan Aspinall

==== Third round (best of seventeen legs) ====
Player	Score	Player	Player	Score	Player
(England) Joe Cullen	9 – 1	(England) Mark Frost	(Germany) René Eidams	3 – 9	(England) James Wilson
(England) Stuart Kellett	9 – 7	(Netherlands) Joey ten Berge	(England) Ricky Evans	9 – 5	(England) Andy Boulton
(Netherlands) Ryan de Vreede	9 – 5	(England) Josh Payne	(England) Robbie Green	5 – 9	(Netherlands) Dirk van Duijvenbode
(Netherlands) Raymond van Barneveld	9 – 8	(England) David Pallett	(Netherlands) Jelle Klaasen	9 – 6	(England) Matt Clark
(Netherlands) Vincent van der Voort	9 – 3	(England) Dean Winstanley	(Netherlands) Jeffrey de Graaf	8 – 9	(England) Rob Cross (Q)
(England) Lee Evans	7 – 9	(England) Jamie Caven	(Australia) Simon Whitlock	9 – 6	(England) Ian White
(England) Terry Jenkins	9 – 7	(Belgium) Ronny Huybrechts	(England) Alan Norris	9 – 7	(Netherlands) Jermaine Wattimena
(Scotland) Gary Anderson	9 – 7	(England) Dave Chisnall	(England) Darren Webster	9 – 5	(Scotland) Andrew Davidson (Q)
(England) James Wade	2 – 9	(Austria) Mensur Suljović	(Belgium) Kim Huybrechts	9 – 1	(England) Steve Maish (Q)
(England) Stephen Bunting	9 – 8	(Wales) Jamie Lewis	(England) Justin Pipe	9 – 6	(England) Alex Roy (Q)
(Wales) Gerwyn Price	8 – 9	(England) Joe Murnan	(Wales) Mark Webster	9 – 3	(England) Matthew Edgar
(Australia) Kyle Anderson	9 – 2	(England) Andy Hamilton	(Northern Ireland) Brendan Dolan	6 – 9	(England) Barry Lynn (Q)
(Netherlands) Michael van Gerwen	9 – 2	(England) Ryan Harrington	(Netherlands) Benito van de Pas	9 – 7	(England) Mervyn King
(England) Michael Smith	9 – 8	(Northern Ireland) Daryl Gurney	(England) Steve Beaton	5 – 9	(Scotland) Peter Wright
(Scotland) John Henderson	9 – 4	(Sweden) Magnus Caris	(England) Phil Taylor	9 – 5	(England) Arron Monk
(England) Andy Jenkins	9 – 5	(England) Richie Corner	(England) Adrian Lewis	9 – 1	(England) Tony Newell

=== Saturday 5 March ===
==== Fourth round (best of seventeen legs) ====
Player	Score	Player	Player	Score	Player
Alan Norris	6 – 9	Joe Cullen	Michael Smith	5 – 9	Stuart Kellett
Phil Taylor 106.00	9 – 3	Raymond van Barneveld 101.70	Ricky Evans	8 – 9	Darren Webster
Jelle Klaasen	9 – 8	Joe Murnan	Vincent van der Voort 91.37	9 – 2	Andy Jenkins 86.93
Simon Whitlock 85.01	3 – 9	Benito van de Pas 90.31	Gary Anderson 88.83	3 – 9	Barry Lynn 94.64 (Q)
Mensur Suljović	9 – 8	Ryan de Vreede	Kim Huybrechts	9 – 3	Justin Pipe
Stephen Bunting 89.81	9 – 6	Jamie Caven 83.19	Mark Webster	9 – 4	Dirk van Duijvenbode
Kyle Anderson	9 – 2	James Wilson	Michael van Gerwen 106.82	9 – 5	Rob Cross 95.98 (Q)
Terry Jenkins 94.21	5 – 9	Peter Wright 95.82	Adrian Lewis 96.46	9 – 6	John Henderson 94.59

==== Fifth round (best of seventeen legs) ====
Player	Score	Player
(Wales) Mark Webster 97.81	9 – 5	(Austria) Mensur Suljović 93.83
(Netherlands) Michael van Gerwen 102.20	9 – 2	(Belgium) Kim Huybrechts 86.72
(England) Stuart Kellett 87.68	5 – 9	(England) Barry Lynn (Q) 88.29
(England) Phil Taylor 103.60	9 – 7	(Netherlands) Vincent van der Voort 101.08
(Netherlands) Benito van de Pas 95.85	2 – 9	(Australia) Kyle Anderson 96.48
(England) Stephen Bunting 92.44	7 – 9	(England) Joe Cullen 93.23
(Scotland) Peter Wright 96.77	9 – 5	(England) Darren Webster 89.03
(England) Adrian Lewis 91.17	7 – 9	(Netherlands) Jelle Klaasen 97.16

=== Sunday 6 March ===
==== Quarter-finals (best of nineteen legs) ====
Player	Score	Player
(Netherlands) Michael van Gerwen 95.99	10 – 6	(England) Barry Lynn (Q) 91.20
(Scotland) Peter Wright 102.29	10 – 7	(England) Joe Cullen 101.83
(England) Phil Taylor 105.57	10 – 3	(Wales) Mark Webster 92.44
(Netherlands) Jelle Klaasen 98.24	10 – 0	(Australia) Kyle Anderson 90.42

==== Semi-finals and Final ====
Semi-finals (best of 19 legs)
(Netherlands) Jelle Klaasen 90.44	5
(Scotland) Peter Wright 96.68	10
(Netherlands) Michael van Gerwen 107.57	10
(England) Phil Taylor 104.57	6

Final (best of 21 legs)
(Scotland) Peter Wright 98.33	4
(Netherlands) Michael van Gerwen 106.68	11

== Media coverage ==
Like the 2015 tournament, the 2016 tournament was broadcast live in the UK on ITV4 and ITV4 HD.
