= Paolo Nebrida =

Filipino darts player

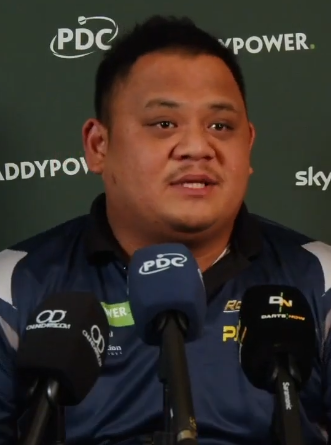
- Nebrida at the 2025 World Championship

Personal information
- Nickname: "Pow"
- Born: 31 December 1994 (age 31) Subic, Philippines

Sport
- Sport: Darts
- Playing since: 2012
- Darts: 24g Robson
- Laterality: Right-handed
- Walk-on music: "Warriors of the World United" by Manowar

Organisation (see split in darts)
- BDO: 2014–2018
- PDC: 2023–
- Current world ranking: (PDC) NR (5 November 2026)

PDC premier events – best performances
- World Championship: Last 32: 2025
- Grand Slam: Group Stage: 2026

Other tournament wins
- Years
Hong Kong Open	2016
PDC Asian Championship	2026
PDC Asian Tour	2023 (×1); 2024 (×3); 2025 (×2)

Paolo Nebrida (born 31 December 1994) is a Filipino professional darts player who competes in the Professional Darts Corporation (PDC) events. He has won seven titles on the Asian Tour, finished as runner-up at the 2022 PDC Asian Championship, and reached the last 32 at the 2025 PDC World Championship.

== Career ==
Nebrida qualified for the 2018 PDC World Youth Championship, progressing through his group before being knocked out at the round of 16 stage by Callan Rydz. Having qualified to represent the Philippines at the 2021 PDC World Cup of Darts, he was unable to travel to Germany to take part, due to European Union COVID-19 vaccine protocols. Instead he was replaced by Christian Perez.

Having reached the final of the 2022 PDC Asian Championship, Nebrida sealed his qualification for the 2023 PDC World Darts Championship, his debut at the competition. In his first round match, Nebrida was defeated 3–2 by Danny Jansen, after coming back from 2–0 down. At the 2024 PDC World Championship, Nebrida was defeated by Simon Whitlock 3–2 in the first round.

At the 2025 PDC World Championship, Nebrida earned a first win at the competition by defeating Jim Williams 3–2. During his second round match, he defeated nineteenth seed Ross Smith 3–0 to become the first Filipino player to reach the last 32, dedicating the victory to compatriot Sandro Eric Sosing following his withdrawal from the competition due to ill health.

Nebrida became the first Filipino player to win a match on the World Series of Darts when he defeated Rob Cross 6–3 in the first round of the 2025 Bahrain Darts Masters. At the 2025 World Cup of Darts, Nebrida represented the Philippines alongside Lourence Ilagan. He hit all four doubles in the team's upset victory over Belgium in the group stage.

== World Championship results ==
=== PDC World Championship ===
- 2023: First round (lost to Danny Jansen 2–3)
- 2024: First round (lost to Simon Whitlock 2–3)
- 2025: Third round (lost to Jeffrey de Graaf 1–4)
- 2026: First round (lost to Scott Williams 0–3)

== Performance timeline ==
=== BDO ===
Tournament	2016
BDO Ranked televised events
World Masters	2R

=== PDC ===
Tournament	2018	2022	2023	2024	2025	2026
PDC Ranked televised events
World Championship	DNQ		1R	1R	3R	1R
Grand Slam	Did not qualify					RR
PDC Non-ranked televised events
World Cup	Did not participate				2R	RR
World Youth Championship	3R	Did not participate				
PDC Other events
Asian Championship	NH	F	RR	2R	2R	W
