= Toru Suzuki (darts player) =

Japanese darts player

Tōru Suzuki
Personal information
- Full name: Tōru Suzuki
- Born: 7 October 1987 (age 39) Yamanashi, Yamanashi Prefecture, Japan
- Home town: Yamanashi, Japan

Sport
- Sport: Darts
- Playing since: 2012
- Darts: 22g Unicorn
- Laterality: Right-handed
- Walk-on music: "Supermassive Black Hole" by Muse

Organisation (see split in darts)
- PDC: 2019–

PDC premier events – best performances
- World Championship: Last 96: 2021, 2023

Other tournament wins
- Years
PDC Asia Qualifier	2021

Tōru Suzuki (鈴木 徹, Suzuki Tōru; born 7 October 1987) is a Japanese professional soft-tip and steel-tip darts player who plays in Professional Darts Corporation (PDC) and other national events. He has competed twice during the PDC World Darts Championship and represented his country at the PDC World Cup of Darts.

== Career ==
Suzuki plays in the soft-tip tournaments since 2012. In 2017, he was able to win a few tournaments at the Perfect Japan Tour and made it onto the podium overall. However, the PDC Asia Tour has not been very successful for him. Suzuki had by far the greatest success in November 2020 when he won the PDC Asia Qualifier held in Japan. In the final match he beat Kota Suzuki by 5–3 in legs. The victory guaranteed him a debut in the 2021 PDC World Darts Championship. In the first round match he lost to Madars Razma by 0–3 in sets.

In June 2022, together with Tomoya Goto, Suzuki represented Japan for the first time at the 2022 PDC World Cup of Darts, but they lost 5–2 to Belgium (Dimitri Van den Bergh and Kim Huybrechts). At the end of September, Suzuki was able to qualify for the 2023 PDC World Darts Championship via advance to the semi-finals of the 2022 PDC Asian Championship.

== World Championship results ==
=== PDC ===
- 2021: First round (lost to Madars Razma 0–3)
- 2023: First round (lost to Boris Krčmar 0–3)

== Performance timeline ==
Tournament	2021	2022	2023
PDC Ranked televised events
World Championship	1R	DNQ	1R
PDC Non-ranked televised events
World Cup of Darts	DNQ	1R	
