= 2018 Danish Darts Open =

Tournament information
- Dates: 22–24 June 2018
- Venue: Brøndbyhallen
- Location: Copenhagen
- Country: Denmark
- Organisation(s): PDC
- Format: Legs
- Prize fund: £135,000
- Winner's share: £25,000
- High checkout: 167 (Netherlands) Jelle Klaasen (second round)

Champion(s)
- (Austria) Mensur Suljović

The 2018 Danish Darts Open was the eighth of thirteen PDC European Tour events on the 2018 PDC Pro Tour. The tournament took place at Brøndbyhallen, Copenhagen, Denmark from 22–24 June 2018. It featured a field of 48 players and £135,000 in prize money, with £25,000 going to the winner.

Mensur Suljović won his second European Tour title, defeating Simon Whitlock 8–3 in the final.

This was the first PDC European Tour event to be held in Scandinavia.

== Prize money ==
This is how the prize money is divided:

Stage (num. of players)		Prize money
Winner	(1)	£25,000
Runner-up	(1)	£10,000
Semi-finalists	(2)	£6,000
Quarter-finalists	(4)	£4,000
Third round losers	(8)	£3,000
Second round losers	(16)	£2,000
First round losers	(16)	£1,000
Total	£135,000	

Prize money will count towards the PDC Order of Merit, the ProTour Order of Merit and the European Tour Order of Merit, with one exception: should a seeded player lose in the second round (last 32), their prize money will not count towards any Orders of Merit, although they still receive the full prize money payment.

== Qualification and format ==
The top 16 entrants from the PDC ProTour Order of Merit on 11 May will automatically qualify for the event and will be seeded in the second round.

The remaining 32 places will go to players from five qualifying events – 18 from the UK Qualifier (held in Milton Keynes on 18 May), eight from the West/South European Qualifier (held on 7 June), two from the Host Nation Qualifier (held on 21 June), two from the Nordic & Baltic Qualifier (excluding Danish players, held on 21 June), one from the East European Qualifier (held on 25 February), and one to the highest ranked PDCNB player on the PDC Order of Merit on 30 May.

The following players will take part in the tournament:

Top 16
1. (Netherlands) Michael van Gerwen (third round)
2. (England) Michael Smith (second round)
3. (Scotland) Peter Wright (quarter-finals)
4. (England) Rob Cross (third round)
5. (Northern Ireland) Daryl Gurney (second round)
6. (Austria) Mensur Suljović (champion)
7. (England) Joe Cullen (quarter-finals)
8. (Wales) Jonny Clayton (second round)
9. (England) Ian White (second round)
10. (England) James Wade (third round)
11. (England) Darren Webster (third round)
12. (Australia) Simon Whitlock (runner-up)
13. (England) Mervyn King (quarter-finals)
14. (Wales) Gerwyn Price (third round)
15. (England) Stephen Bunting (third round)
16. (Scotland) John Henderson (second round)

UK Qualifier
- (England) Steve Beaton (second round)
- (Australia) Paul Nicholson (first round)
- (England) Adrian Lewis (semi-finals)
- (England) Richard North (first round)
- (England) Scott Taylor (second round)
- (England) Ricky Evans (third round)
- (England) Barry Lynn (second round)
- (England) Steve West (semi-finals)
- (England) Ted Evetts (first round)
- (England) Chris Dobey (first round)
- (Scotland) Robert Thornton (first round)
- (Northern Ireland) Mickey Mansell (first round)
- (England) Peter Jacques (second round)
- (England) Wayne Jones (first round)
- (Northern Ireland) Brendan Dolan (quarter-finals)
- (England) Ryan Joyce (second round)
- (Republic of Ireland) William O'Connor (first round)
- (England) Adam Huckvale (first round)

West/South European Qualifier
- (Netherlands) Jelle Klaasen (second round)
- (Netherlands) Jermaine Wattimena (second round)
- (Spain) Cristo Reyes (second round)
- (Germany) Max Hopp (second round)
- (Austria) Rusty-Jake Rodriguez (second round)
- (Germany) Dragutin Horvat (first round)
- (Germany) Martin Schindler (first round)
- (Netherlands) Jeffrey de Zwaan (first round)

Host Nation Qualifier
- (Denmark) Per Laursen (first round)
- (Denmark) Brian Løkken (first round)

Nordic & Baltic Qualifier
- (Sweden) Dennis Nilsson (first round)
- (Lithuania) Darius Labanauskas (third round)

Highest Ranked PDCNB Player on the PDC Order of Merit
- (Latvia) Madars Razma (second round)

East European Qualifier
- (Poland) Krzysztof Ratajski (first round)

== Draw ==
First round (best of 11 legs); 22 June
(Scotland) Robert Thornton 76.07	5
(England) Scott Taylor 82.53	6
(Germany) Martin Schindler 95.12	4
(Northern Ireland) Brendan Dolan 90.25	6
(England) Richard North 92.02	5
(Lithuania) Darius Labanauskas 91.64	6
(Denmark) Per Laursen 81.60	4
(England) Steve West 87.04	6
(England) Ricky Evans 90.87	6
(Sweden) Dennis Nilsson 88.95	4
(Netherlands) Jermaine Wattimena 96.43	6
(England) Wayne Jones 94.07	5
(England) Steve Beaton 100.47	6
(England) Adam Huckvale 92.97	2
(Germany) Max Hopp 84.66	6
(Germany) Dragutin Horvat 83.45	4
(England) Adrian Lewis 84.93	6
(England) Ted Evetts 79.61	3
(Australia) Paul Nicholson 90.52	4
(England) Peter Jacques 89.02	6
(Netherlands) Jeffrey de Zwaan 75.41	0
(Latvia) Madars Razma 104.86	6
(Austria) Rusty-Jake Rodriguez 91.69	6
(Republic of Ireland) William O'Connor 96.60	5
(England) Ryan Joyce 87.74	6
(Poland) Krzysztof Ratajski 91.06	2
(Denmark) Brian Løkken 81.99	2
(Spain) Cristo Reyes 88.48	6
(England) Barry Lynn 90.95	6
(England) Chris Dobey 86.65	5
(Northern Ireland) Mickey Mansell 87.60	5
(Netherlands) Jelle Klaasen 90.97	6

Second round (best of 11 legs); 23 June
1	(Netherlands) Michael van Gerwen 91.30	6
(England) Scott Taylor 85.66	2
16	(Scotland) John Henderson 85.07	4
(Northern Ireland) Brendan Dolan 90.82	6
8	(Wales) Jonny Clayton 98.66	5
(Lithuania) Darius Labanauskas 97.03	6
9	(England) Ian White 89.14	4
(England) Steve West 86.71	6
5	(Northern Ireland) Daryl Gurney 93.74	3
(England) Ricky Evans 99.44	6
12	(Australia) Simon Whitlock 98.07	6
(Netherlands) Jermaine Wattimena 90.42	3
4	(England) Rob Cross 96.04	6
(England) Steve Beaton 98.66	5
13	(England) Mervyn King 96.36	6
(Germany) Max Hopp 84.18	5
2	(England) Michael Smith 103.26	5
(England) Adrian Lewis 101.39	6
15	(England) Stephen Bunting 90.49	6
(England) Peter Jacques 87.22	3
7	(England) Joe Cullen 105.99	6
(Latvia) Madars Razma 95.93	3
10	(England) James Wade 95.38	6
(Austria) Rusty-Jake Rodriguez 81.85	4
6	(Austria) Mensur Suljović 96.86	6
(England) Ryan Joyce 91.34	1
11	(England) Darren Webster 94.19	6
(Spain) Cristo Reyes 103.01	5
3	(Scotland) Peter Wright 96.86	6
(England) Barry Lynn 86.44	1
14	(Wales) Gerwyn Price 92.23	6
(Netherlands) Jelle Klaasen 90.99	3

Third round (best of 11 legs); 24 June
1	(Netherlands) van Gerwen 95.17	4
(Northern Ireland) Dolan 91.83	6
(Lithuania) Labanauskas 94.13	5
(England) West 97.95	6
(England) Evans 92.73	5
12	(Australia) Whitlock 97.76	6
4	(England) Cross 98.12	5
13	(England) King 98.50	6
(England) Lewis 95.40	6
15	(England) Bunting 93.95	4
7	(England) Cullen 99.94	6
10	(England) Wade 92.18	4
6	(Austria) Suljović 98.92	6
11	(England) Webster 101.17	5
3	(Scotland) Wright 95.64	6
14	(Wales) Price 90.49	1

Quarter-finals (best of 11 legs); 24 June
(Northern Ireland) Dolan 86.15	3
(England) West 96.78	6
12	(Australia) Whitlock 92.34	6
13	(England) King 87.10	4
(England) Lewis 98.43	6
7	(England) Cullen 95.90	2
6	(Austria) Suljović 96.44	6
3	(Scotland) Wright 97.54	4

Semi-finals (best of 13 legs); 24 June
(England) West 96.48	4
12	(Australia) Whitlock 97.14	7
(England) Lewis 102.28	6
6	(Austria) Suljović 99.91	7

Final (best of 15 legs); 24 June
12	(Australia) Whitlock 94.78	3
6	(Austria) Suljović 99.31	8
