= List of players with a 2018 PDC Tour Card =

To compete in the Professional Darts Corporation pro tour tournaments one needs a Tour Card.

In total 128 players are granted Tour Cards, which enables them to participate in all Players Championships, UK Open Qualifiers and European Tour events.

A Tour Card is valid for 2 years. The top 64 in the PDC Order of Merit all received Tour Cards automatically, and those who won a two-year card in 2017 still had a valid card for 2018. The top 2 of the 2017 Challenge Tour and Development Tour also won cards. 33 remaining places were played out at the 2018 Q-Schools, with the four days of competition giving two Cards a day from the UK Q-School and one a day from the European Q-School; with the remaining players being ranked and the top players also receiving Cards. All players who won a card at either Q-School had their Order of Merit ranking reset to zero.

== Players ==
| No. | Country | Player | Prize money | Qualified through |
|---|---|---|---|---|
| 1 | Netherlands | Michael van Gerwen | £1,799,250 | Top 64 of Order of Merit |
| 2 | Scotland | Peter Wright | £754,250 | Top 64 of Order of Merit |
| 3 | England | Rob Cross | £611,250 | Top 64 of Order of Merit |
| 4 | Scotland | Gary Anderson | £458,250 | Top 64 of Order of Merit |
| 5 | Northern Ireland | Daryl Gurney | £416,750 | Top 64 of Order of Merit |
| 6 | Austria | Mensur Suljović | £373,500 | Top 64 of Order of Merit |
| 7 | England | Dave Chisnall | £332,500 | Top 64 of Order of Merit |
| 8 | Australia | Simon Whitlock | £310,250 | Top 64 of Order of Merit |
| 9 | England | James Wade | £276,250 | Top 64 of Order of Merit |
| 10 | Netherlands | Raymond van Barneveld | £273,750 | Top 64 of Order of Merit |
| 11 | England | Michael Smith | £267,750 | Top 64 of Order of Merit |
| 12 | Wales | Gerwyn Price | £264,750 | Top 64 of Order of Merit |
| 13 | Netherlands | Benito van de Pas | £255,000 | Top 64 of Order of Merit |
| 14 | England | Ian White | £253,250 | Top 64 of Order of Merit |
| 15 | England | Alan Norris | £244,250 | Top 64 of Order of Merit |
| 16 | Belgium | Kim Huybrechts | £236,750 | Top 64 of Order of Merit |
| 17 | Netherlands | Jelle Klaasen | £233,000 | Top 64 of Order of Merit |
| 18 | England | Joe Cullen | £219,250 | Top 64 of Order of Merit |
| 19 | England | Darren Webster | £209,000 | Top 64 of Order of Merit |
| 20 | England | Adrian Lewis | £209,000 | Top 64 of Order of Merit |
| 21 | England | Stephen Bunting | £192,500 | Top 64 of Order of Merit |
| 22 | Australia | Kyle Anderson | £182,500 | Top 64 of Order of Merit |
| 23 | England | Mervyn King | £180,500 | Top 64 of Order of Merit |
| 24 | England | Steve Beaton | £180,000 | Top 64 of Order of Merit |
| 25 | England | Justin Pipe | £152,000 | Top 64 of Order of Merit |
| 26 | Scotland | Robert Thornton | £151,750 | Top 64 of Order of Merit |
| 27 | Scotland | John Henderson | £150,750 | Top 64 of Order of Merit |
| 28 | Spain | Cristo Reyes | £147,750 | Top 64 of Order of Merit |
| 29 | Wales | Jamie Lewis | £147,000 | Top 64 of Order of Merit |
| 30 | England | James Wilson | £143,250 | Top 64 of Order of Merit |
| 31 | Wales | Jonny Clayton | £143,000 | Top 64 of Order of Merit |
| 32 | England | Steve West | £136,750 | Top 64 of Order of Merit |
| 33 | Netherlands | Vincent van der Voort | £127,500 | Top 64 of Order of Merit |
| 34 | Wales | Mark Webster | £122,500 | Top 64 of Order of Merit |
| 35 | England | Chris Dobey | £114,750 | Top 64 of Order of Merit |
| 36 | Northern Ireland | Brendan Dolan | £111,500 | Top 64 of Order of Merit |
| 37 | Netherlands | Christian Kist | £107,500 | Top 64 of Order of Merit |
| 38 | Belgium | Dimitri Van den Bergh | £105,500 | Top 64 of Order of Merit |
| 39 | Netherlands | Jermaine Wattimena | £104,250 | Top 64 of Order of Merit |
| 40 | England | Terry Jenkins | £98,500 | Top 64 of Order of Merit |
| 41 | England | Robbie Green | £92,250 | Top 64 of Order of Merit |
| 42 | Belgium | Ronny Huybrechts | £91,250 | Top 64 of Order of Merit |
| 43 | England | James Richardson | £85,750 | Top 64 of Order of Merit |
| 44 | Netherlands | Jan Dekker | £79,250 | Top 64 of Order of Merit |
| 45 | England | Jamie Caven | £78,750 | Top 64 of Order of Merit |
| 46 | England | Kevin Painter | £74,000 | Top 64 of Order of Merit |
| 47 | England | Keegan Brown | £66,000 | Top 64 of Order of Merit |
| 48 | England | Josh Payne | £63,750 | Top 64 of Order of Merit |
| 49 | Germany | Max Hopp | £63,500 | Top 64 of Order of Merit |
| 50 | South Africa | Devon Petersen | £63,000 | Top 64 of Order of Merit |
| 51 | England | Richard North | £60,000 | Top 64 of Order of Merit |
| 52 | Netherlands | Ron Meulenkamp | £58,500 | Top 64 of Order of Merit |
| 53 | England | Joe Murnan | £56,000 | Top 64 of Order of Merit |
| 54 | Netherlands | Jeffrey de Graaf | £54,750 | Top 64 of Order of Merit |
| 55 | England | Andrew Gilding | £53,500 | Top 64 of Order of Merit |
| 56 | Ireland | William O'Connor | £50,750 | Top 64 of Order of Merit |
| 57 | Austria | Rowby-John Rodriguez | £49,000 | Top 64 of Order of Merit |
| 58 | England | Ricky Evans | £48,750 | Top 64 of Order of Merit |
| 59 | Ireland | Steve Lennon | £48,250 | Top 64 of Order of Merit |
| 60 | Austria | Zoran Lerchbacher | £47,000 | Top 64 of Order of Merit |
| 61 | Ireland | Mick McGowan | £45,500 | Top 64 of Order of Merit |
| 62 | England | Peter Jacques | £43,000 | Top 64 of Order of Merit |
| 63 | Spain | Antonio Alcinas | £41,500 | Top 64 of Order of Merit |
| 64 | Germany | Martin Schindler | £38,750 | Top 64 of Order of Merit |
| 65 | England | Ryan Searle | £25,250 | 2016 Challenge Tour |
| 66 | England | Darren Johnson | £23,500 | 2017 Q-School |
| 67 | England | Chris Quantock | £22,000 | 2017 Q-School |
| 68 | Netherlands | Jimmy Hendriks | £19,250 | 2017 Q-School |
| 69 | Australia | Paul Nicholson | £18,000 | 2017 Q-School |
| 70 | Scotland | Jamie Bain | £17,750 | 2017 Q-School |
| 71 | England | Kirk Shepherd | £17,750 | 2017 Q-School |
| 72 | Northern Ireland | Mickey Mansell | £17,000 | 2017 Q-School |
| 73 | England | Steve Hine | £15,250 | 2017 Q-School |
| 74 | England | Ritchie Edhouse | £9,750 | 2017 Q-School |
| 75 | England | Aden Kirk | £9,250 | 2016 Development Tour |
| 76 | England | Scott Taylor | £8,750 | 2017 Q-School |
| 77 | England | Paul Rowley | £8,000 | 2017 Q-School |
| 78 | England | Ronnie Baxter | £7,750 | 2017 Q-School |
| 79 | Wales | Richie Burnett | £7,500 | 2017 Q-School |
| 80 | Latvia | Madars Razma | £7,250 | 2017 Q-School |
| 81 | Germany | Maik Langendorf | £5,750 | 2017 Q-School |
| 82 | England | Stephen Burton | £5,250 | 2017 Q-School |
| 83 | England | Ross Twell | £4,500 | 2016 Development Tour |
| 84 | England | Lee Bryant | £4,250 | 2017 Q-School |
| 85 | Netherlands | Sven Groen | £3,000 | 2017 Q-School |
| 86 | Canada | John Norman Jnr | £2,500 | 2017 Q-School |
| 87 | Canada | John Part | £2,250 | 2017 Q-School |
| 88 | Scotland | Jim Brown | £1,500 | 2017 Q-School |
| 89 | England | Scott Darbyshire | £1,500 | 2017 Q-School |
| 90 | Hong Kong | Royden Lam | £1,000 | 2017 Q-School |
| 91 | India | Prakash Jiwa | £1,000 | 2017 Q-School |
| 92 | England | Wayne Jones | £0 | 2017 Challenge Tour |
| 93 | England | Mark Dudbridge | £0 | 2017 Challenge Tour |
| 94 | England | Luke Humphries | £0 | 2017 Development Tour |
| 95 | England | Adam Hunt | £0 | 2017 Development Tour |
| 96 | England | Eddie Dootson | £0 | 2018 Q-School |
| 97 | Australia | Corey Cadby | £0 | 2018 Q-School |
| 98 | Netherlands | Jeffrey de Zwaan | £0 | 2018 Q-School |
| 99 | England | Alan Tabern | £0 | 2018 Q-School |
| 100 | Wales | Robert Owen | £0 | 2018 Q-School |
| 101 | Netherlands | Mario Robbe | £0 | 2018 Q-School |
| 102 | England | Arron Monk | £0 | 2018 Q-School |
| 103 | England | George Killington | £0 | 2018 Q-School |
| 104 | Poland | Tytus Kanik | £0 | 2018 Q-School |
| 105 | England | Bradley Brooks | £0 | 2018 Q-School |
| 106 | Canada | Dawson Murschell | £0 | 2018 Q-School |
| 107 | Germany | Gabriel Clemens | £0 | 2018 Q-School |
| 108 | England | Nathan Aspinall | £0 | 2018 Q-School |
| 109 | England | Ross Smith | £0 | 2018 Q-School |
| 110 | England | Terry Temple | £0 | 2018 Q-School |
| 111 | England | Ryan Harrington | £0 | 2018 Q-School |
| 112 | England | Simon Stevenson | £0 | 2018 Q-School |
| 113 | England | Gary Eastwood | £0 | 2018 Q-School |
| 114 | Scotland | John Goldie | £0 | 2018 Q-School |
| 115 | England | Matthew Edgar | £0 | 2018 Q-School |
| 116 | England | Ryan Meikle | £0 | 2018 Q-School |
| 117 | England | Ryan Joyce | £0 | 2018 Q-School |
| 118 | Northern Ireland | Kevin Burness | £0 | 2018 Q-School |
| 119 | England | Tony Newell | £0 | 2018 Q-School |
| 120 | England | Luke Woodhouse | £0 | 2018 Q-School |
| 121 | England | Peter Hudson | £0 | 2018 Q-School |
| 122 | England | Mark Wilson | £0 | 2018 Q-School |
| 123 | Netherlands | Danny Noppert | £0 | 2018 Q-School |
| 124 | Germany | Robert Marijanović | £0 | 2018 Q-School |
| 125 | Netherlands | Dirk van Duijvenbode | £0 | 2018 Q-School |
| 126 | Netherlands | Vincent Kamphuis | £0 | 2018 Q-School |
| 127 | Spain | José Justicia | £0 | 2018 Q-School |
| 128 | Belgium | Davy Van Baelen | £0 | 2018 Q-School |

== See also ==
- List of darts players
- List of darts players who have switched organisation
