= Mike Bonser =

Australian darts player

Personal information
- Nickname: "The Hurt"
- Born: Mike Merz; 14 October 1970 (age 56) Wadalba, New South Wales, Australia

Sport
- Sport: Darts
- Playing since: 1998
- Darts: 24g Shot!
- Laterality: Right-handed
- Walk-on music: "I Gotta Feeling" by The Black Eyed Peas

Organisation (see split in darts)
- BDO: 1998–2020
- PDC: 2018–2023

Other tournament wins
- Years
NSW Open	1998
Russell Stewart Classic	2011
Silver Classic Central Close	2011

Mike Bonser (né Merz, born 14 October 1970) is a former Australian professional darts player who has played in the Professional Darts Corporation (PDC) events.

== Career ==
Bonser made his World Series of Darts debut at the 2018 Melbourne Darts Masters, where he was whitewashed to Peter Wright of Scotland.

Bonser played events in the World ParaDarts (WPD) & World Disability Darts Association (WDDA) since August 2026.
