= Raymond O'Donnell =

Australian darts player

Personal information
- Nickname: "Bubba"
- Born: 22 June 1978 (age 48) Broken Hill, Australia
- Home town: Broken Hill, Australia

Sport
- Sport: Darts
- Playing since: 1997
- Darts: 22 gram
- Laterality: Right-handed
- Walk-on music: "Back in Black" by AC/DC

Organisation (see split in darts)
- PDC: 2006–

Other tournament wins
- Years
DPA ProTour	2019 (x2)
DPA Queensland Bubble	2021
Murray Bridge Grand Prix	2017
NDDA Open	2009
Victoria Open	2009

Raymond O'Donnell (born 22 June 1978) is an Australian professional darts player who plays in Professional Darts Corporation (PDC) events.

O'Donnell qualified for the 2018 Melbourne Darts Masters, where he would lose 6–4 to Raymond van Barneveld.

In 2017, he won the Murray Bridge Grand Prix, defeating Justin Thompson 8–6 in the final.
