= Mick Lacey =

Irish hurler (1930–1997)

Personal information
- Native name: Mícheál Ó Laitheasa (Irish)
- Born: 1930 Cappoquin, County Waterford, Ireland
- Died: December 1997 (aged 67) Dunmore Road, Waterford, Ireland
- Height: 5 ft 9 in (175 cm)

Sport
- Sport: Hurling
- Position: Right corner-back
Club
- Years: Club
- Cappoquin
Club titles
- Waterford titles: 0
Inter-county
- Years: County
- Waterford
Inter-county titles
- Munster titles: 2
- All-Irelands: 1
- NHL: 0

Michael Lacey (1930 – December 1997) was an Irish hurler who played as a right wing-back for club side Cappoquin and at inter-county level with the Waterford senior hurling team.

== Honours ==
Cappoquin

- Waterford Junior Hurling Championship (1): 1948

Waterford

- All-Ireland Senior Hurling Championship (1): 1959
- Munster Senior Hurling Championship (2): 1957, 1959
