= Keita Ono =

Japanese darts player (born 1987)

Keita Ono 小野恵太
Personal information
- Nickname: The Samurai
- Born: December 17, 1987 (age 38) Edogawa, Tokyo, Japan
- Home town: Edogawa, Tokyo, Japan

Sport
- Sport: Darts
- Darts: TARGET Keita Ono SOLO GENERATION-3 SP 20g (in swispoint)
- Laterality: Right-handed

Organisation (see split in darts)
- BDO: 2014–2015
- PDC: 2015–

WDF major events – best performances
- World Masters: Last 80: 2015

PDC premier events – best performances
- World Championship: Last 64: 2016

Other tournament wins
- Years
Japan Open	2013
PDC World Japan Qualifying Event	2015
Soft Tip Dartslive Hong Kong	2012
Soft Tip Dartslive Premium Stage	2016
PDC Asian Tour
PDC Asian Tour (Shizuoka)	2025
PDC Asian Tour (Kuala Lumpur)	2025

Keita Ono (小野恵太, Ono Keita; born December 17, 1987) is a Japanese darts player.

== Career ==
Ono won a Dartslive event in Hong Kong in 2012 by defeating Lourence Ilagan. He claimed the 2013 Japan Open by beating Gordon Dixon in the final. Ono attempted to qualify for the 2014 PDC World Darts Championship, but lost to eventual winner Morihiro Hashimoto in the Semi-final of the Japan Qualifying Event.

Ono qualified for the 2016 PDC World Championship by winning the Japan Qualifying Event. After defeating Alex Tagarao 2–0 in the preliminary round, he lost 3–0 to 16-time world champion Phil Taylor in the first round. Ono made his debut at the World Cup and, together with partner Haruki Muramatsu, they were beaten 5–2 by Northern Ireland in the first round. Ono lost 6–1 in the opening round of the Tokyo Darts Masters to Raymond van Barneveld, but won the Soft Tip Dartslive Premium Stage event by overcoming Boris Krčmar in the final.

== World Championship results ==
=== PDC ===
- 2016: First round (lost to Phil Taylor 0–3)
