= Christian Perez (darts player) =

Filipino darts player (born 1982)

Personal information
- Full name: Christian Dumalaug Perez
- Nickname: "The Titan"
- Born: 17 January 1982 (age 44) Koronadal, Philippines

Sport
- Sport: Darts
- Playing since: 2000
- Darts: 24g Gary Robson – Christian Perez Signature
- Laterality: Right-handed
- Walk-on music: "Give Me Everything" by Pitbull featuring Ne-Yo, Afrojack and Nayer

Organisation (see split in darts)
- PDC: 2009– (Tour Card: 2023–2024)
- WDF: 2011–2018, 2025–
- Current world ranking: (WDF) 116 ▲13 (17 August 2026)

PDC premier events – best performances
- World Championship: Last 64: 2010, 2012
- UK Open: Last 96: 2024
- Grand Slam: Group Stage: 2022

Other tournament wins
- Years
PDC Asian Championship	2022
Dartslive Hong-Kong	2013
Malaysian Open	2018
Philippines Open	2011
Scottish Open	2025
Isle of Man Open	2025

Christian Dumalaug Perez (born 17 January 1982) is a Filipino professional darts player who competes in Professional Darts Corporation (PDC) and World Darts Federation events. He was the 2022 PDC Asian Champion. He won his first ranking WDF title at the 2025 Scottish Open.

He was a PDC Tour Card holder from 2023 to 2024, reaching his first semi-final in a ranking PDC event at Players Championship 4 in 2024.

He has represented the Philippines on three occasions at the PDC World Cup of Darts, reaching the second round in 2023 partnering Lourence Ilagan.

== Career ==
=== 2009 ===
In October 2009, Perez reached the final of the Shanghai International Darts Open, losing 10–4 to John Part. He later qualified for the 2010 PDC World Darts Championship where he defeated Denmark's Per Laursen 4–3 in the preliminary round. In the first round against Robert Thornton, Perez won the first set, but eventually lost 3–1.

=== 2012 ===
Perez qualified for the 2012 PDC World Darts Championship after defeating Bobong Gabiana in the final of the Philippines qualifier. He won through the preliminary round where he beat Dietmar Burger 4 legs to 0, setting up a first round match with Alan Tabern, which he then lost 3 sets to 1 on the same day.

Perez represented the Philippines with Lourence Ilagan in the 2012 PDC World Cup of Darts and together they were beaten 5–3 by the United States in the first round. In December he lost in the final of the Soft Tip World Championship to Takehiro Suzuki of Japan.

=== 2013 ===
Perez was due to play with Ilagan once more in the 2013 World Cup of Darts but they were forced to withdraw due to travel problems. In October, he won the third Soft Tip Dartslive event in Hong King by seeing off Ilagan in the final. Perez progressed to the final of the Grand Final for the second year in a row where Ilagan exacted revenge by defeating him 4–1.

=== 2014 ===
In September 2014, Perez won the South Asian Qualifier for the 2015 World Championship with a 5–2 victory over Bryan Eribal. He played Spain's Cristo Reyes in the preliminary round and was whitewashed 4–0.

=== 2023 ===
At the 2023 PDC World Darts Championship, Perez was defeated by Simon Whitlock 2–3 in the first round.

In January he took part in the PDC UK Q-School qualifying tournament. On the fourth day of the tournament finals, Perez obtained a PDC Tour Card for the next two years by finishing 9th on the UK Order of Merit. The same year, Perez and Ilagan again played the World Cup of Darts. They lost in the second round 8–5 to the Scottish team (Peter Wright & Gary Anderson).

=== 2024 ===
Perez played on the Pro Tour again in 2024. At the 2024 PDC Players Championship series, Perez made the semi-finals for the first time at event four. Perez defeated Danny Lauby Jr. 6–5, Martin Schindler 6–3, Ricardo Pietreczko 6–1, Gerwyn Price 6–4 and Raymond van Barneveld 6–2 before losing to Damon Heta 7–2.

Perez made his UK Open debut at the 2024 event, winning his second round tie 6–2 against Jeffrey Sparidaans, before falling to Vincent van der Voort 6–4 in his third round match.

== World Championship results ==
=== PDC ===
- 2010: First round (lost to Robert Thornton 1–3)
- 2012: First round (lost to Alan Tabern 1–3)
- 2015: Preliminary round (lost to Cristo Reyes 0–4 in legs)
- 2023: First round (lost to Simon Whitlock 2–3)

== Performance timeline ==
Tournament	2010	2012	2015	2022	2023	2024
PDC World Championship	1R	1R	Prel.	DNQ	1R	DNQ
UK Open	DNP				WD	3R
Grand Slam of Darts	DNQ			RR	DNQ	
PDC Non-ranked televised events
PDC World Cup of Darts	DNP	1R	DNP		2R	RR
Year-end ranking	102	-	-	127	181	

PDC Players Championships

Season	1	2	3	4	5	6	7	8	9	10	11	12	13	14	15	16	17	18	19	20	21	22	23	24	25	26	27	28	29	30
2023	Did not participate												HIL; QF	HIL; 1R	Did not participate															
2024	WIG; 1R	WIG; 1R	LEI; 1R	LEI; SF	HIL; DNP	HIL; DNP	LEI; 1R	LEI; 1R	HIL; 3R	HIL; 1R	HIL; 1R	HIL; 1R	MIL; 1R	MIL; 1R	MIL; 1R	MIL; 2R	MIL; 1R	MIL; 2R	MIL; 1R	WIG; 1R	WIG; 1R	MIL; 1R	MIL; 1R	WIG; 1R	WIG; 1R	WIG; 1R	WIG; DNP	WIG; DNP	LEI; DNP	LEI; DNP

Performance Table Legend
W	Won the tournament	F	Finalist	SF	Semifinalist	QF	Quarterfinalist	#R; RR; Prel.	Lost in # round Round-robin; Preliminary round	DQ	Disqualified
DNQ	Did not qualify	DNP	Did not participate	WD	Withdrew	NH	Tournament not held	#R; RR; Prel.	Lost in # round Round-robin; Preliminary round	NYF	Not yet founded
