= Barry Lynn (darts player) =

English darts player

Personal information
- Nickname: "Life Wire"
- Born: 18 March 1987 (age 39) Braintree, Essex, England

Sport
- Sport: Darts
- Playing since: 2007
- Darts: 23g
- Laterality: Right-handed
- Walk-on music: "Ode to Joy" by Ludwig van Beethoven

Organisation (see split in darts)
- PDC: 2014–2019

WDF major events – best performances
- World Masters: Last 48: 2016
- World Trophy: Last 32: 2016

PDC premier events – best performances
- UK Open: Quarter-final: 2016

Other tournament wins
- Tournament: Years
- PDC Challenge Tour: 2016

Barry Lynn (born 18 March 1987) is an English semi-professional darts player who competed in Professional Darts Corporation events and the Braintree Premier League.

He is most famous for his "dream run" in the 2016 UK Open, after having to qualify via the Riley's qualifiers, before reaching the quarter-finals. After early wins against Daniel Studholme and Dean Stewart and Brett Claydon, he defeated former major finalist Brendan Dolan, before knocking out the reigning back-to-back world champion Gary Anderson in round 4 by a 9–3 scoreline. Then after defeating Stuart Kellett in round 5, he took on the world number one Michael van Gerwen in the quarter-finals, where he eventually lost 10–6.

He would later qualify for the 2016 BDO World Trophy, losing in the first round to Darius Labanauskas. He also won a PDC Challenge Tour title in 2016.
