= George Killington =

English darts player (born

Personal information
- Full name: George Alan Killington
- Nickname: Killer
- Born: 23 May 1996 (age 30) Tottenham, England
- Home town: Harlow, England

Sport
- Sport: Darts
- Playing since: 2010
- Darts: 24g Mission Signature
- Laterality: Right-handed
- Walk-on music: "Omen" by The Prodigy

Organisation (see split in darts)
- PDC: 2012– (Tour Card: 2018–2019, 2022–2025)

PDC premier events – best performances
- UK Open: Last 64: 2023, 2025

Other tournament wins
- Years
British International Boys	2013
PDC Development Tour	2014, 2018

George Alan Killington (born 23 May 1996) is an English professional darts player who competes in Professional Darts Corporation (PDC) events. He is a former PDC Tour Card holder. His best PDC major performances are twice reaching the last 64 at the UK Open: in 2023 and 2025.

In his youth career, Killington won 2 PDC Development Tour titles.

== Career ==
After entering the PDC Youth Tour in 2012, Killington won his first title during the 2014 Youth Tour at the sixth event in Wigan, defeating Germany's Max Hopp 4–2 in the final.

Killington entered UK Q-School in 2018, winning a two-year PDC Tour Card on the third day by defeating Gary Eastwood 5–3 in the final.

At the 2018 UK Open, Killington defeated Andy Jenkins 6–4 in the first round but lost to Keegan Brown 6–3 in the second round. At the 2019 UK Open, Killington beat Ted Evetts 6–3 in the second round before losing to Madars Razma 6–4 in the third round.

== Performance timeline ==
Tournament	2013	2014	2015	2016	2017	2018	2019	2020	2021	2022	2023	2024	2025
PDC Ranked televised events
World Masters	Did not qualify												Prel.
UK Open	Did not participate					2R	3R	DNP		2R	4R	3R	4R
PDC Non-ranked televised events
World Youth Championship	2R	2R	1R	DNP		RR	RR	3R	Did not participate				
Career statistics
Season-end ranking (PDC)	-	-	-	-	-	130	121	-	-	118	88	124	

=== PDC European Tour ===
Season	1	2	3	4	5	6	7	8	9	10	11	12	13
2018	Did not qualify												EDT; 1R
2022	IDO; DNP	GDC; 1R	Did not qualify										
2023	Did not qualify					DDC; 1R	Did not qualify			EDM; 1R	GDO; 1R	HDT; DNQ	GDC; 3R

=== PDC Players Championships ===
Season	1	2	3	4	5	6	7	8	9	10	11	12	13	14	15	16	17	18	19	20	21	22	23	24	25	26	27	28	29	30	31	32	33	34
2018	BAR; 2R	BAR; 1R	BAR; 1R	BAR; 1R	MIL; 1R	MIL; 4R	BAR; 1R	BAR; 1R	WIG; 1R	WIG; 1R	MIL; 1R	MIL; 1R	WIG; 1R	WIG; 3R	BAR; 1R	BAR; 1R	BAR; 1R	BAR; 2R	DUB; 2R	DUB; 1R	BAR; 1R	BAR; 1R												
2019	WIG; DNP		WIG; 1R	WIG; 1R	BAR; 1R	BAR; 1R	WIG; 1R	WIG; 1R	BAR; 1R	BAR; 1R	BAR; 2R	BAR; 2R	BAR; 3R	BAR; 1R	BAR; 1R	BAR; 2R	WIG; 1R	WIG; 2R	BAR; 1R	BAR; 1R	HIL; 1R	HIL; 1R	BAR; 1R	BAR; 1R	BAR; 1R	BAR; DNP	DUB; 1R	DUB; 1R	BAR; 2R	BAR; 2R				
2022	BAR; 1R	BAR; 1R	WIG; 3R	WIG; 4R	BAR; 1R	BAR; 1R	NIE; 1R	NIE; 1R	BAR; 2R	BAR; 3R	BAR; 1R	BAR; 2R	BAR; 1R	WIG; 2R	WIG; 1R	NIE; 1R	NIE; 1R	BAR; 1R	BAR; 1R	BAR; 1R	BAR; 1R	BAR; 1R	BAR; 4R	BAR; 2R	BAR; 4R	BAR; 2R	BAR; 4R	BAR; 1R	BAR; 1R	BAR; 1R				
2023	BAR; 1R	BAR; 1R	BAR; 1R	BAR; 1R	BAR; 3R	BAR; 1R	HIL; 1R	HIL; 1R	WIG; 1R	WIG; 1R	LEI; 1R	LEI; 2R	HIL; 4R	HIL; 1R	LEI; 2R	LEI; 2R	HIL; 1R	HIL; 3R	BAR; 3R	BAR; 2R	BAR; 2R	BAR; 1R	BAR; 1R	BAR; 1R	BAR; 2R	BAR; 1R	BAR; 4R	BAR; 1R	BAR; 1R	BAR; 2R				
2024	WIG; 1R	WIG; 2R	LEI; 1R	LEI; 1R	HIL; 2R	HIL; 1R	LEI; 1R	LEI; 2R	HIL; 2R	HIL; 1R	HIL; 2R	HIL; 3R	MIL; 1R	MIL; 1R	MIL; 1R	MIL; 1R	MIL; 1R	MIL; 2R	MIL; 1R	WIG; 1R	WIG; 2R	LEI; 1R	LEI; 1R	WIG; 1R	WIG; 1R	WIG; 1R	WIG; 2R	WIG; 4R	LEI; 2R	LEI; 1R				
2025	WIG; 1R	WIG; 1R	ROS; 3R	ROS; 3R	LEI; 1R	LEI; 1R	HIL; 2R	HIL; 1R	LEI; 1R	LEI; 1R	LEI; 1R	LEI; 1R	ROS; 1R	ROS; 1R	HIL; 2R	HIL; 1R	LEI; 2R	LEI; 1R	LEI; 2R	LEI; 1R	LEI; 2R	HIL; 1R	HIL; 1R	MIL; 1R	MIL; 1R	HIL; DNP		LEI; 1R	LEI; 1R	LEI; 1R	WIG; 2R	WIG; 2R	WIG; 1R	WIG; 1R
