= Ciarán Kelly =

Ciarán Kelly may refer to:

- Ciarán Kelly (footballer, born 1980)
- Ciaran Kelly (footballer, born 1998)
