= Martin Heneghan =

Irish darts player

Personal information
- Full name: Martin Heneghan
- Nickname: "Little Dog"
- Born: 19 September 1991 (age 35) Roundfort, County Mayo, Ireland
- Home town: Roundfort, Ireland

Sport
- Sport: Darts
- Playing since: 2009
- Darts: 23g Unicorn
- Laterality: Right-handed
- Walk-on music: "Who Let The Dogs Out" by Baha Men

Organisation (see split in darts)
- BDO: 2009–2020
- PDC: 2011–2013, 2022–
- WDF: 2009–

WDF major events – best performances
- World Masters: Last 80: 2018

Other tournament wins
- Years
| INDO GP Strokestown | 2010 |
| INDO Lawlors Singles | 2010 |
| INDO Mohill Spring Festival | 2010 |
Medal record
Men's Darts
Representing Ireland
WDF Europe Cup
| Gold medal – first place | 2018 Budapest | Men's singles |
| Bronze medal – third place | 2022 Gandía | Men's team |
| Bronze medal – third place | 2024 Samorin | Men's pairs |

Martin Heneghan (born 19 September 1991) is an Irish professional darts player who currently plays in World Darts Federation (WDF) and Professional Darts Corporation (PDC) events. He is a WDF Europe Cup singles champion.

== Career ==
He made his first appearance in an international competition at the Limerick Classic, where he advanced to the quarter-finals. The following year he competed in numerous national tournaments, winning three times at the Grand Prix Strokestown, Lawlors Singles and Mohill Spring Festival. Very good results in the national competition allowed him to compete in his debut 2010 Winmau World Masters tournament. He lost in the second round match to Vegard Elvevoll. At the end of the year, he participated in the inaugural 2011 PDC World Youth Championship tournament and lost in the third round to Shaun Griffiths by 3–4 in legs.

In 2011, he took part in the PDC Development Tour tournaments several times. His best result was the quarter-finals. In September, he participated in the qualification for the BDO World Darts Championship. A month later, he also lost the competition at the Tom Kirby Memorial, which qualifying for the PDC World Darts Championship. In the same year, he represented Ireland for the first time at the 2011 WDF World Cup, but without much success. In the next two years, he often competed in the PDC Development Tour and PDC Challenge Tour tournaments.

In 2012, he once again entered the 2012 Winmau World Masters, but he lost in first round to Steve Eusebini by 2–3 in sets. In 2013, he played in the 2013 PDC World Youth Championship, but lost in first round to Josh Payne by 3–5 in legs. In the following years, he tried several times to qualify for the BDO World Darts Championship and competed in the World Masters tournaments, but without much success.

In 2017, he qualified for the 2017 WDF World Cup tournament. In singles competition, he lost in second round to Wesley Harms by 1–4 in legs. He did not get good results in other team competitions. Until 2018, Heneghan had not won any international tournament, including the youth competition. In September 2018, he made his debut in the 2018 WDF Europe Cup, representing Ireland and won the gold medal in the individual men's competition, by defeating top international players like Daniel Larsson, Thibault Tricole and Paul Hogan. In the final he defeated Pavel Jirkal by 7–2 in legs. In the team competition, the Irishman did not manage to achieve similar achievements. In the same year, he advanced to the third round of the 2018 Winmau World Masters, lost to David Copley by 1–3 in sets.

In 2019, he took part in the 2019 WDF World Cup, but he did not manage to repeat such a good result like at the European stage. He lost in the first round to Kostas Sakellariou. In the team competition, as in previous years, the Irish teams dropped out very quickly. In 2021, he took part in the Irish Open, but lost in the third round to Shane McGuirk. The following year, he returned to competing in the PDC Challenge Tour tournaments and tried to achieved Pro Tour Card in the Q-School.

== Personal life ==
Apart from sports competition, he works as a Day Service Manager. He is married and has a child. His younger brother Conor also plays darts at an international level.

== Performance timeline ==
| Tournament | 2010 | 2011 | 2012 | 2013 | 2014 | 2015 | 2016 | 2017 | 2018 | 2019 | 2020 | 2021 | 2022 | 2023 |
|---|---|---|---|---|---|---|---|---|---|---|---|---|---|---|
WDF Ranked televised events
| World Masters | 2R | DNQ | 1R | 1R | 1R | DNQ | 1R | DNQ | 3R | DNQ | NH | | | |
PDC Non-ranked televised events
| World Youth Championship | NH | 3R | DNQ | 1R | DNP | | | | | | | | | |
