= Goalkeeper (association football) =

Position in association football

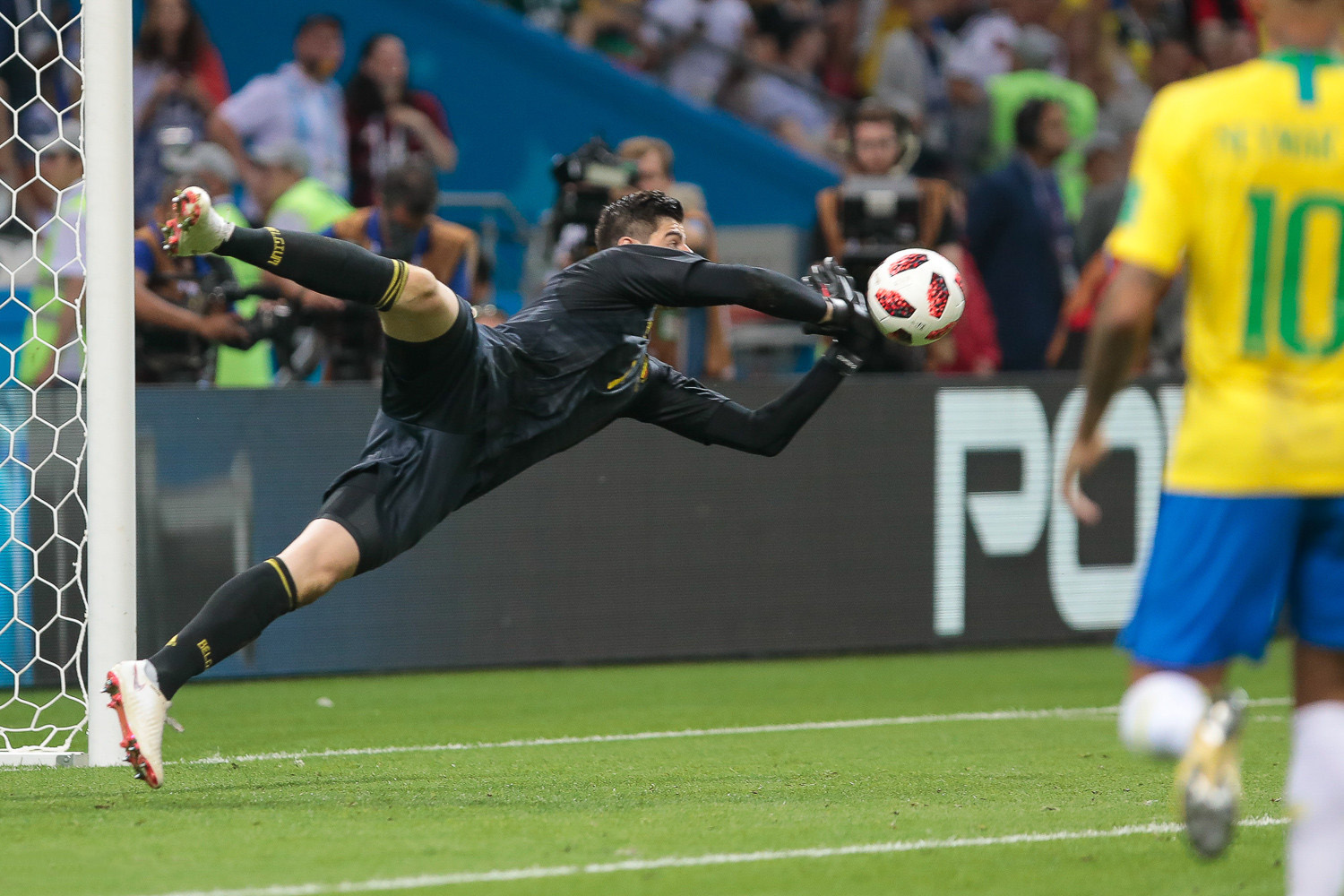
Belgian goalkeeper Thibaut Courtois making a save during the FIFA World Cup quarter-final match against Brazil on 6 July 2018.

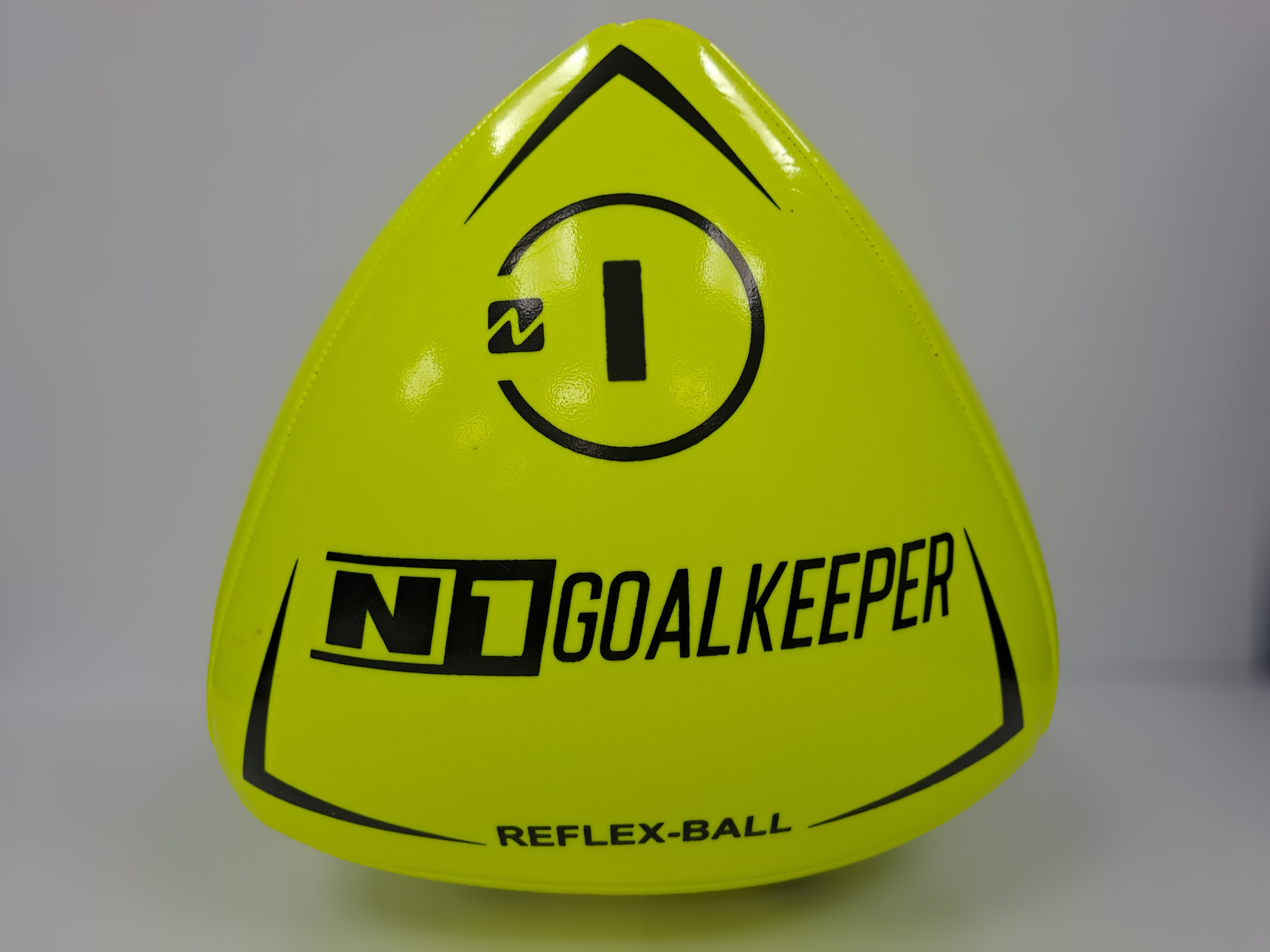
Non spherical reflex ball used in goalkeeper training

The goalkeeper (sometimes written as goal-keeper and often shortened to "keeper") is a position in association football. It is the most specialised position in the sport. The goalkeeper's main role is to stop the opposing team from scoring a "goal" (i.e. putting the ball over the goal line). This is accomplished by the goalkeeper moving into the trajectory of the ball to either catch it or re-direct it away from the vicinity of the goal. Within the penalty area, goalkeepers are allowed to use their hands, giving them (outside throw-ins) the sole rights on the field to handle the ball. The goalkeeper is indicated by wearing a different coloured kit from their teammates and opposition.

The back-pass rule is a rule that disallows handling passes back to keepers from teammates in most cases. Goalkeepers usually perform goal kicks and also give commands to their defense during corner kicks, direct and indirect free kicks, and marking. Goalkeepers play an important role in directing onfield strategy as they have an unrestricted view of the entire pitch, giving them a unique perspective on play development.

The goalkeeper is the only mandatory position of a team. If they are injured or sent off, another player must take their place. To replace a goalkeeper who is sent off, a team usually (but is not required to) brings on a substitute keeper in place of an outfield player to ensure they still play an outfield player down. If a team does not have a substitute goalkeeper, or they have already used all of their permitted substitutions for the match, an outfield player has to play as goalkeeper.

Because the position requires different skills from the outfielders, goalkeepers train separately from their teammates and often work with a goalkeeping coach to develop their play. While outfielders typically must be in good cardiovascular shape to play up to 90 minutes in a match, a goalkeeper must be able to move quickly and have fast feet for little bursts. During a match, goalkeepers may get a lot of action, usually in brief intervals, until their teammates can clear the ball out of the zone. During practice, goalkeepers focus heavily on footwork and being able to get up quickly after a save is made. A goalkeeper must be able to get set, meaning feet shoulder width apart and on their toes, before the next shot comes their way, so they can react and make the save.

As with all players, goalkeepers may wear any squad number, but the number 1 is almost always reserved for a team's first-choice goalkeeper, and the number 13 for the second-choice or backup goalkeeper.

The goalkeeper is notably the only position that is not included in formations. This is because the goalkeeper is the only non-outfielder position and the only compulsory position in football.

Although not essential, goalkeepers are standardly tall players due to the height of the goal and the number of crosses, corners, and high shots in football.

== History ==
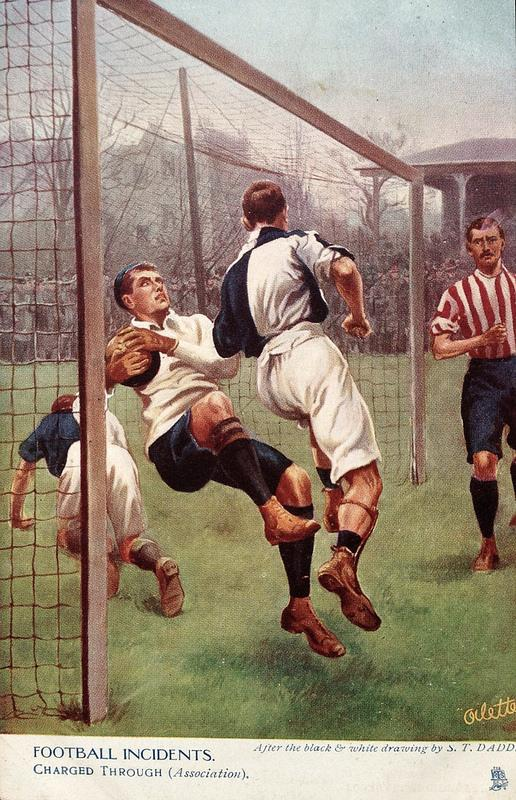
A goalkeeper (left, wearing a white shirt) being charged by a rival player (1905)

Association football, like many sports, has experienced many changes in tactics resulting in the generation and elimination of different positions. Goalkeeper is the only position that is certain to have existed since the codification of the sport. Even in the early days of organised football, when systems were limited or non-existent and the main idea was for all players to attack and defend, teams had a designated member to play as the goalkeeper.

The earliest account of football teams with player positions comes from Richard Mulcaster in 1581 and does not specify goalkeepers. The earliest specific reference to keeping goals comes from Cornish Hurling in 1602. According to Carew: "They pitch two bushes in the ground, some eight or ten foot asunder; and directly against them, ten or twelve score off, other twayne in like distance, which they term their Goals. One of these is appointed by lots, to one side, and the other to his adverse party. There is assigned for their guard, a couple of their best stopping Hurlers." Other references to scoring goals begin in English literature in the early 17th century; for example, in John Day's play The Blind Beggar of Bethnal Green (performed c. 1600; published 1659): "I'll play a gole at camp-ball" (an extremely violent variety of football, popular in East Anglia). Similarly, in a 1613 poem, Michael Drayton refers to "when the Ball to throw, And drive it to the Gole, in squadrons forth they goe". It seems inevitable that wherever a game has evolved goals, some form of goalkeeping must also be developed. David Wedderburn refers to what has been translated from Latin as to "keep goal" in 1633, although this does not necessarily imply a fixed goalkeeper position.

The word "goal-keeper" is used in the novel Tom Brown's School Days (published in 1857, but set in the 1830s). The author is here referring to an early form of rugby football:

You will see in the first place, that the sixth-form boy, who has the charge of goals, has spread his force (the goal-keepers) to occupy the whole space behind the goal-posts, at distances of about five yards apart; a safe and well-kept goal is the foundation of all good play.

The word "goal-keeper" appeared in the Sheffield Rules of 1867, but the term did not refer to a designated player, but rather to "that player on the defending side who for the time being is nearest to his own goal". The goalkeeper, thus defined, did not enjoy any special handling privileges.

The FA's first Laws of the Game of 1863 did not make any special provision for a goalkeeper, with any player being allowed to catch or knock on the ball. Handling the ball was completely forbidden (for all players) in 1870. The next year, 1871, the laws were amended to introduce the goalkeeper and specify that the keeper was allowed to handle the ball "for the protection of his goal". The restrictions on the ability of the goalkeeper to handle the ball were changed several times in subsequent revisions of the laws:

- 1871: the keeper may handle the ball only "for the protection of his goal".
- 1873: the keeper may not "carry" the ball.
- 1883: the keeper may not carry the ball for more than two steps.
- 1887: the keeper may not handle the ball in the opposition's half.
- 1901: the keeper may handle the ball for any purpose (not only in defense of the goal).
- 1905: the keeper may not advance beyond his goalline when defending against a penalty kick.
- 1912: the keeper may handle the ball only in the penalty area.
- 1931: the keeper may take up to four steps (rather than two) while carrying the ball.
- 1992: the keeper may not handle the ball after it has been deliberately kicked to him/her by a team-mate.
- 1997: the keeper may not handle the ball for more than six seconds.
- 2025: the keeper may not handle the ball for more than eight seconds.

Initially, goalkeepers typically played between the goalposts and had limited mobility, except when trying to save opposition shots. Throughout the years, the role of the goalkeeper has evolved, due to the changes in systems of play, to become more active. The goalkeeper is the only player in association football allowed to use their hands to control the ball (other than when restarting play with a throw-in).

During the 1935–36 English football season, young Sunderland AFC goalkeeper of the team, Jimmy Thorpe, died as a result of a kick in the head and chest after he had picked up the ball following a backpass in a game against Chelsea at Roker Park. He continued to take part until the match finished, but collapsed at home afterward and died in hospital four days later from diabetes mellitus and heart failure "accelerated by the rough usage of the opposing team". The tragic end to Thorpe's career led to a change in the rules, where players were no longer allowed to raise their foot to a goalkeeper when he had control of the ball in his arms.

=== Rules aimed at time-wasting ===
Due to several time-wasting techniques that were used by goalkeepers, such as bouncing the ball on the ground or throwing it in the air and then catching it again, in the 1960s, the Laws of the Game were revised further, and the goalkeeper was given a maximum of four steps to travel while holding, bouncing or throwing the ball in the air and catching it again, without having to release it into play. The FIFA Board later also devised an anti-parrying rule, saying that such deliberate parrying to evade the Law was to be regarded also as holding the ball.

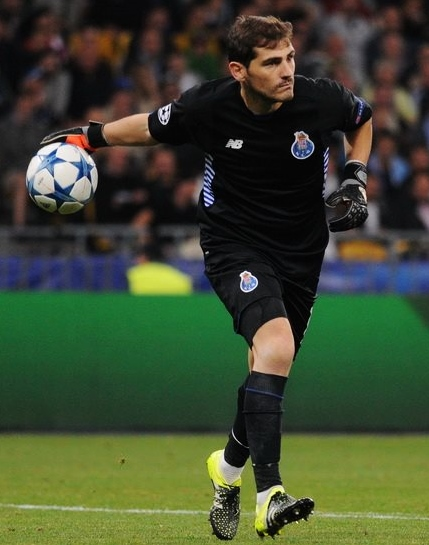
Iker Casillas, playing for Porto in 2015, throwing the ball into play. He shares the records for most clean sheets in international football, along with Hope Solo.

In 1992, the International Football Association Board made changes in the laws of the game that affected goalkeepers—notably the back-pass rule, which prohibits goalkeepers from handling the ball when receiving a deliberate pass from a teammate that is made with their feet. This rule change was made to discourage time-wasting and overly defensive play after the 1990 FIFA World Cup which was described as exceedingly dull, rife with back-passing and goalkeepers holding the ball. Also, goalkeepers would frequently drop the ball and dribble it around, only to pick it up again once opponents came closer to put them under pressure, a typical time-wasting technique. Therefore, another rule was introduced at the same time as the back-pass rule. This rule prohibits goalkeepers from handling the ball again once the ball is released for play; an offense results in an indirect free kick to the opposition. Furthermore, any player negating the spirit of the new rule would be likely to be cautioned for unsporting behaviour and punished by an indirect free-kick.

On 1 July 1997, FIFA decided to extend the back-pass rule by applying it also to throw-ins from defenders to their goalkeeper. To prevent further time-wasting, FIFA also established that if a goalkeeper holds the ball for more than six seconds the referee must adjudge this as time-wasting and award an indirect free-kick to the opposing team. In practice, this rule is rarely enforced: a 2019 study of 45 Bundesliga matches found the goalkeepers violating it in 38.4% of instances of ball handling, none of which were penalised. An example of this rule being enforced in a high-profile match was at the London 2012 Summer Olympics Women's Football semi-final game between the United States and Canada. With Canada in front 3–2 late in the game, their goalkeeper Erin McLeod grabbed the ball from a corner kick and then held onto it for 10 seconds despite being warned by the referee not to waste time. The indirect free kick resulted in a penalty being called for a handball offence, which was scored to make it 3–3 and take the game to extra time, where the United States won the game 4–3.

On 1 March 2025, IFAB approved the change of law 12.2 of the Laws of the Game, and decided to allow goalkeepers to handle the ball for a maximum of eight seconds, and, if violated, the referee would give a corner kick to the opposing team. This ensured more enforcement of the rule. The ongoing rule crackdowns against outfield players feigning injury has seen an increase in goalkeepers feigning injury, as the laws of the game do not give the referee the ability to require a goalkeeper to leave the field like they can with outfield players, or to force a team to make a substitution or change which player is the goalkeeper to enable the match to restart. IFAB announced in early 2026 that they are looking into additional trial changes to the laws of the game to "further assess tactical injury delays by goalkeepers and to propose options to deter such behaviour."

== Laws of the Game and general play ==
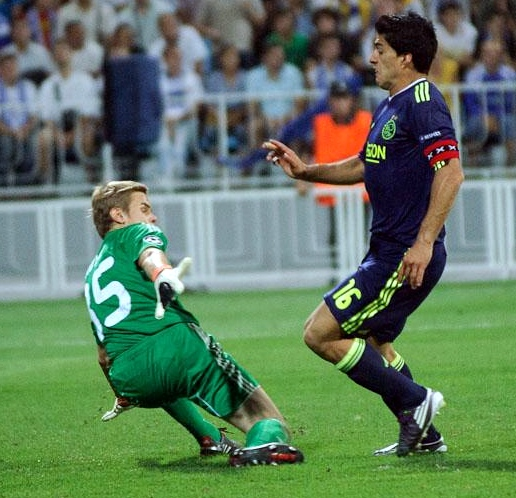
Maksym Koval (left) closes down Luis Suárez.

The position of goalkeeper is the only position in the game that is technically distinct from the others in the course of normal play. The Laws of the Game distinguish the goalkeeper from the other players in several ways, most significantly exempting them from the prohibition on handling the ball, although only within their penalty area. Once a goalkeeper has control of the ball in their hands, opponents are not permitted to challenge them. Goalkeepers have a specialized role as the sole defender against a penalty kick. Goalkeepers are required to wear distinct colours from other players and are permitted to wear caps and tracksuit bottoms.

The Laws mandate that one player on the team must be designated as the goalkeeper at all times, meaning that if a goalkeeper is sent off or injured and unable to continue, another player must assume the goalkeeper position. The Laws allow for teams to change the player designated as a goalkeeper at stoppages in play.

== Responsibilities ==
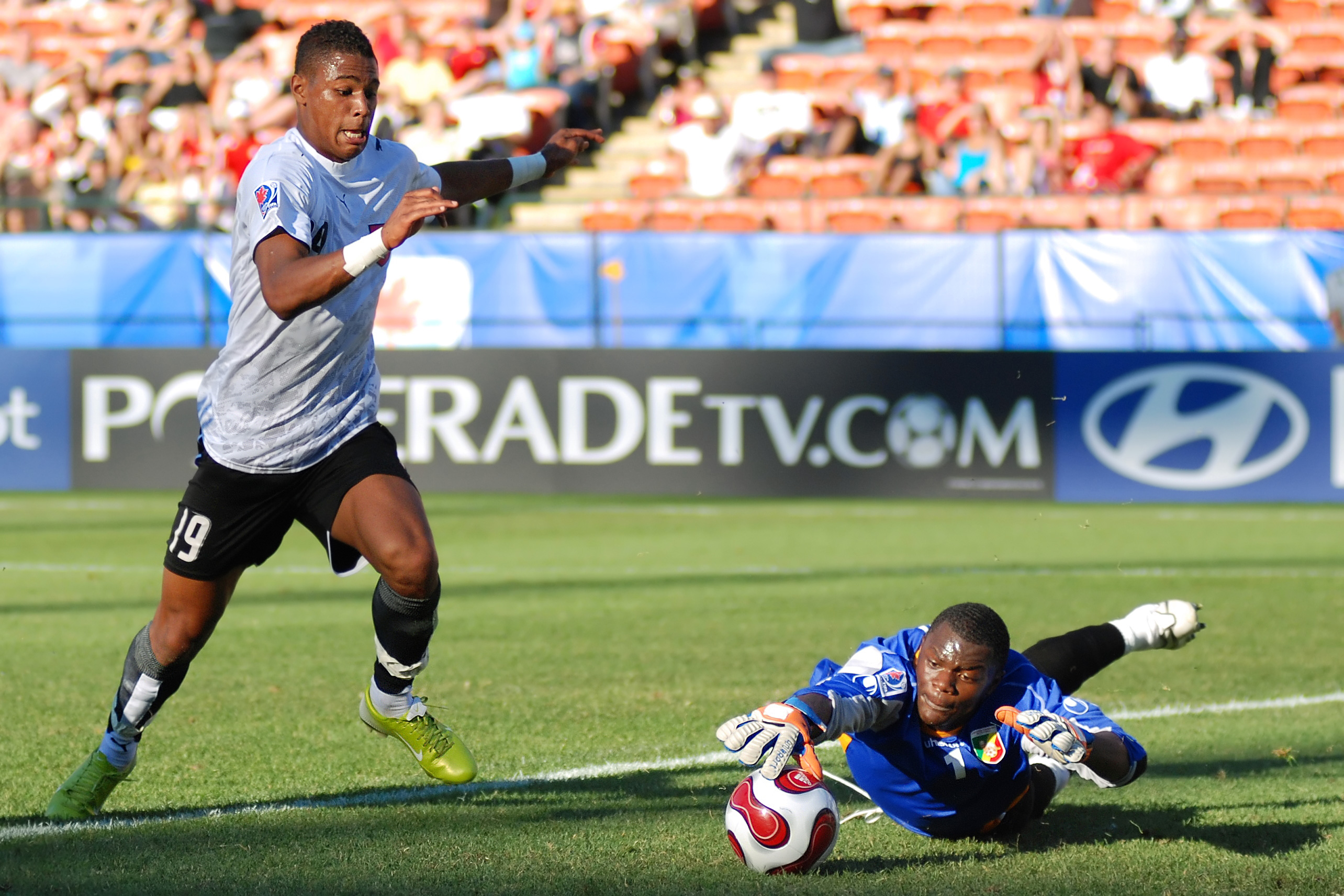
Goalkeeper Destin Onka Malonga (right) making a save

The tactical responsibilities of goalkeepers include:

- To keep goal by physically blocking attempted shots with any part of their body. The keeper is permitted to play the ball anywhere on the field, but may not handle the ball using hands or outstretched arms outside of their penalty area.
- To organise the team's defenders during defensive set pieces such as free kicks and corners. In the case of free kicks, this includes picking the numbers and the organisation of a defensive player "wall". The wall serves to provide a physical barrier to the incoming ball, but some goalkeepers position their walls in certain positions to tempt kick-takers to certain types of shots. Occasionally, goalkeepers may opt to dispense with the wall. Some goalkeepers are also entrusted with the responsibility of picking markers while defending at set pieces.
- To pick out crosses and attempt long passes either by collecting them in flight or punching them clear if heavily challenged by opposing strikers.

Although goalkeepers have special privileges, including the ability to handle the ball in the penalty area, they are otherwise subject to the same rules as any other player.

=== Playmaking and attack ===
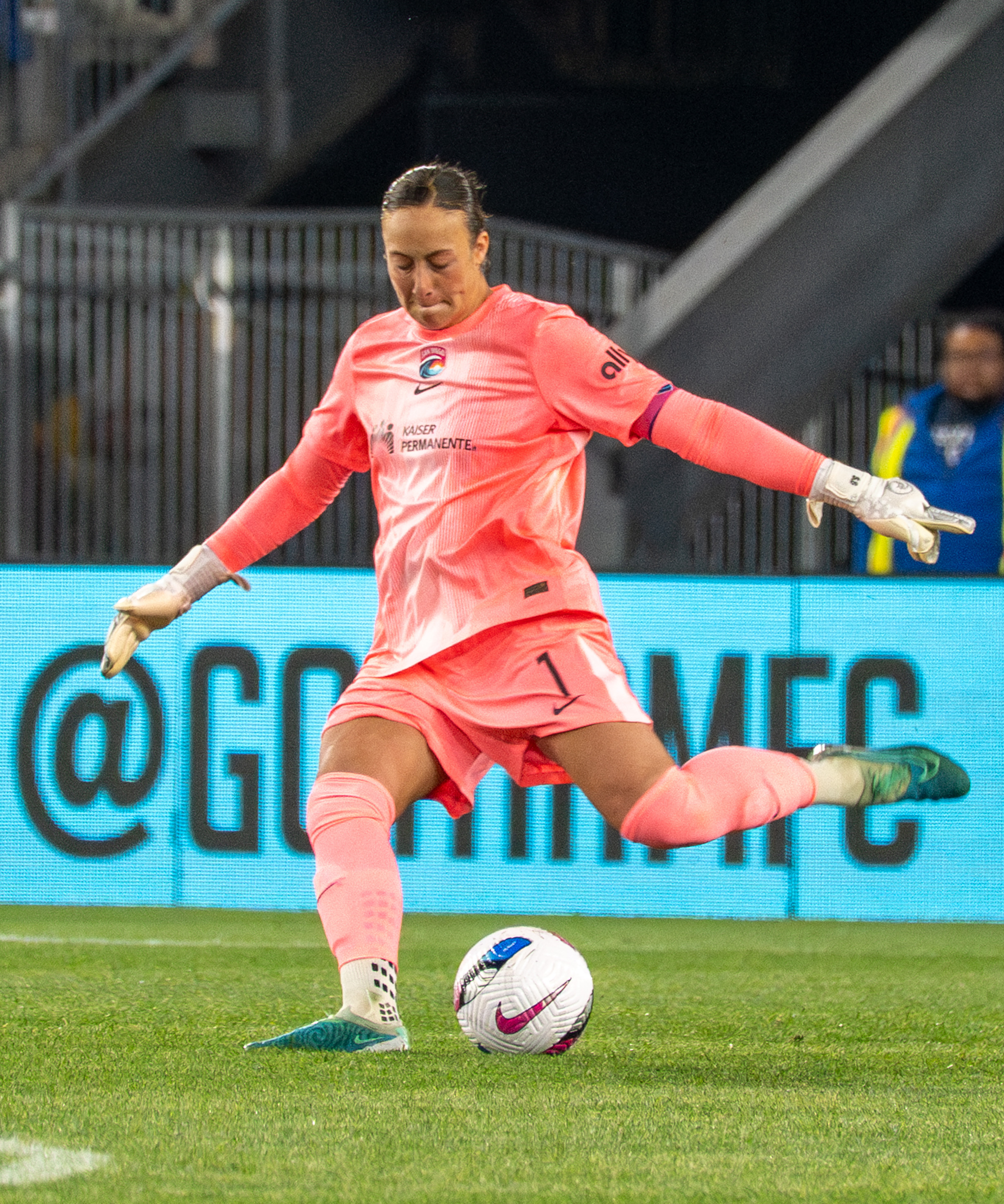
Canadian goalkeeper Kailen Sheridan using her feet

Goalkeepers are not required to stay in the penalty area; they may get involved in play anywhere on the pitch, and it is common for them to act as an additional defender (or 'sweeper') during certain passages of the game. Goalkeepers with a long throwing range or accurate long-distance kicks may be able to quickly create attacking positions for a team and generate goal-scoring chances from defensive situations, a tactic known as the long ball.

==== Sweeper-keeper ====
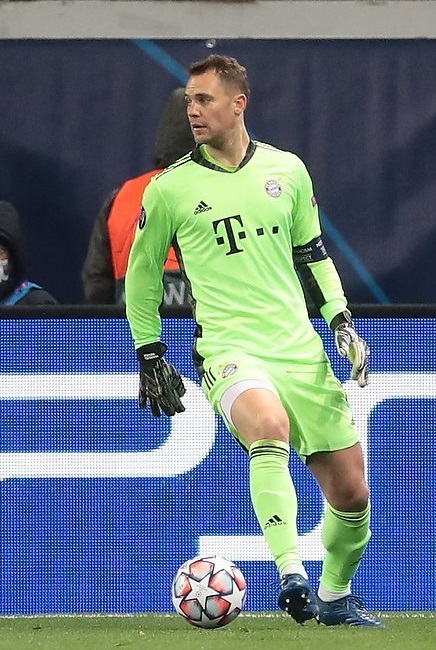
Manuel Neuer has been described as a modern goalkeeper due to his "sweeper-keeper" status

Gyula Grosics from the Hungarian "Golden Team" of the 1950s was thought to be the first goalkeeper to play as the 'sweeper-keeper'. Tommy Lawrence has also been credited with revolutionising the role of the goalkeeper by effectively acting as an 11th outfield player. The rushing playing style used by Liverpool legend Bruce Grobbelaar seen during the 1980s–90s makes him one of the original sweeper-keepers of the modern era. René Higuita was another who became known for his unorthodox, skillful but sometimes reckless techniques. Manuel Neuer has been described as a sweeper-keeper due to his speed and unique style of play which occasionally includes him acting as a sweeper for his team by rushing off his line to anticipate opposing forwards who have beaten the offside trap. With his excellent ball control and distribution, which enables him to start plays from the back, he has said he could play in the German third division as a centre-back if he wanted to. Neuer is also credited for revolutionising the modern goalkeeping position. Hugo Lloris of LAFC and France and former goalkeeper Fabien Barthez have also been described as sweeper-keepers, while Claudio Bravo and Ederson Moraes have even been described as playmakers in the media.

Other players who have been labelled "sweeper-keepers" in the media include Marc-André ter Stegen of FC Barcelona and Germany, Spaniard Víctor Valdés, and the late Lev Yashin, the latter of whom is often cited by pundits as one of the goalkeepers who pioneered the role of the sweeper-keeper. Sweeper-keepers have been popularised by managers who usually employ tactics inspired by total football, such as Johan Cruyff and Pep Guardiola, for example, and are chosen not only for their shot-stopping and goalkeeping abilities, but also due to their skill with the ball at their feet, their ability to pick out passes and contribute to the build-up play of their team, and their speed when rushing out of the penalty area to anticipate opponents, which enables their team to maintain a high defensive line. It is not without risk, as a goalkeeper being so far from the penalty area can lead to spectacular long-range lob goals if they or their team lose possession, as well as risking being red-carded if they run out to challenge an opponent but foul them or handball a shot by mistake.

==== Goalscorers ====
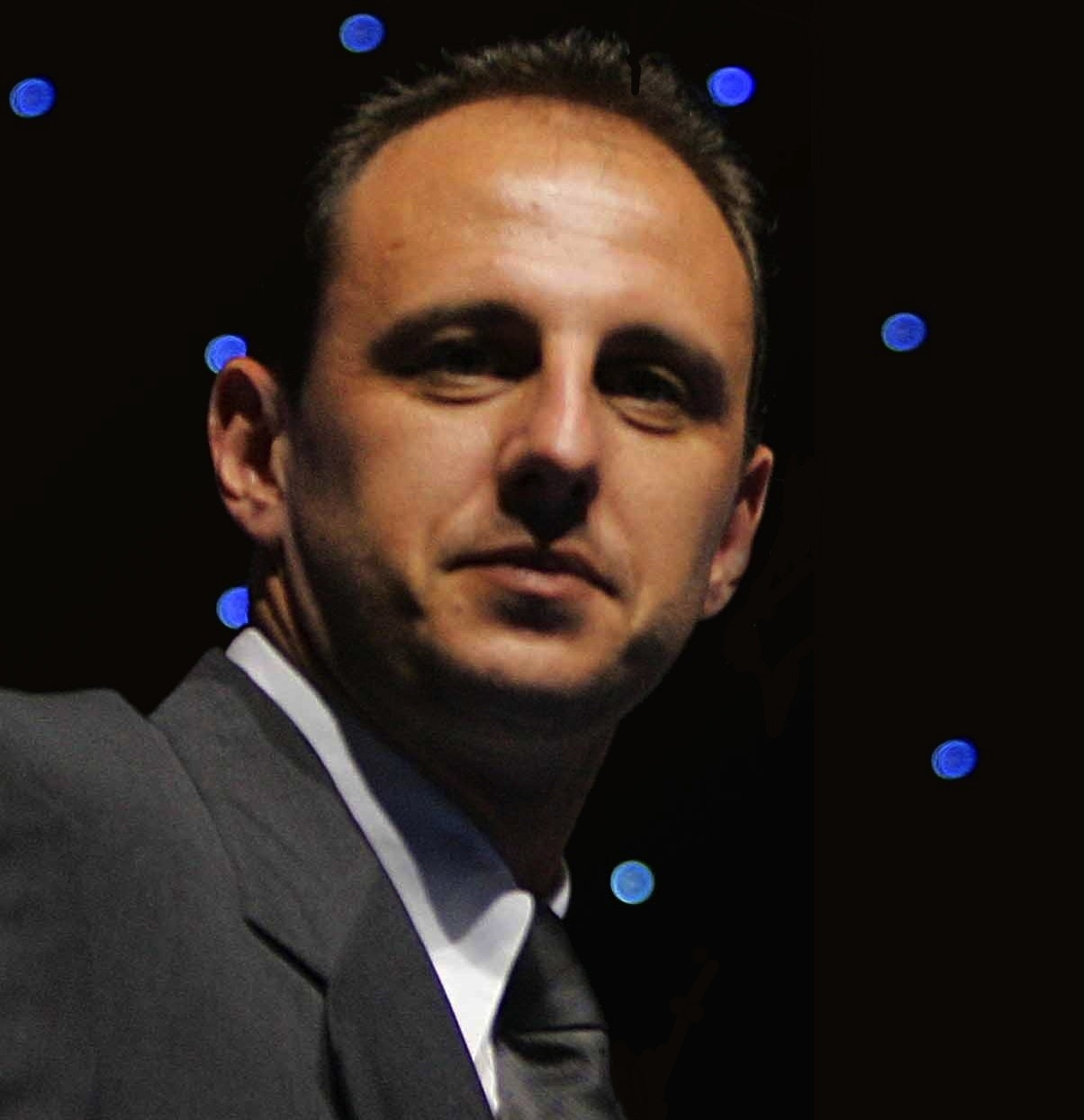
Rogério Ceni is the highest-scoring goalkeeper of all time, with over 100 career goals.

Some goalkeepers have scored goals. Other than by accident when a long kicked clearance reaches the other end of the field and evades the opposing goalkeeper with the aid of strong winds and/or unexpected bounces, this most commonly occurs when a goalkeeper has rushed up to the opposite end of the pitch to give his team a numerical advantage in attack, leaving his own goal undefended (Similar to taking out the goalkeepers in handball or ice hockey, but without the keeper getting substituted). As such, it is normally only done late in a game at set-pieces where the consequences of scoring far outweigh those of conceding a further goal, such as for a team trailing in a knock-out tournament.

Some goalkeepers, such as René Higuita, Jorge Campos, Rogério Ceni, Hans-Jörg Butt and José Luis Chilavert, are also expert set-piece takers. These players may take their team's attacking free kicks or penalties. Rogério Ceni, São Paulo's goalkeeper from 1992 to 2015, has scored 132 goals in his career, more than many outfield players.

== Equipment and attire ==
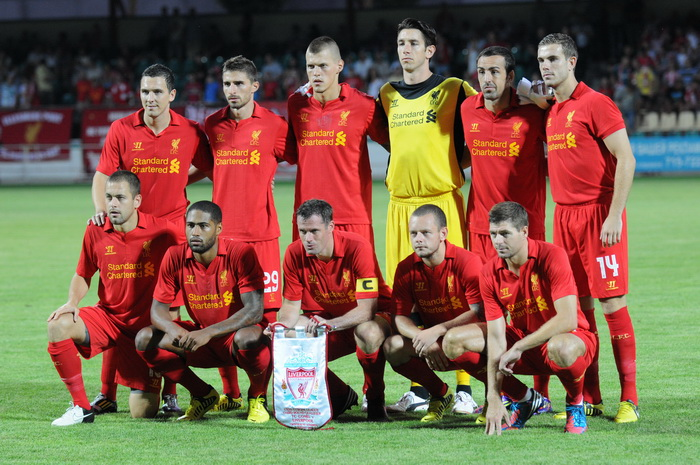
Liverpool F.C. team photo prior to a UEFA Europa League match against FC Gomel. Note the difference in attire of goalkeeper Brad Jones (yellow) with that of the rest of his teammates (red).

Goalkeepers must wear a kit that distinguishes them clearly from other players and match officials, as this is all that the FIFA Laws of the Game require. Some goalkeepers have received recognition for their match attire, such as Lev Yashin of the Soviet Union, who was nicknamed the "Black Spider" for his distinctive all-black outfit; Klaus Lindenberger of Austria, who designed his variation of a clown's costume; Jorge Campos of Mexico, who was popular for his colourful attire; Raul Plassmann of Cruzeiro Esporte Clube and his all-yellow outfit; and Gábor Király for wearing a pair of grey tracksuit bottoms instead of shorts.

Although it was initially more common for goalkeepers to wear long-sleeved jerseys, recently several goalkeepers, such as Gianluigi Buffon, have also been known to wear short sleeves.

Although rare, goalkeepers are permitted to wear visored headgear (such as a baseball cap) to minimize glare from bright sunlight, or a knit cap to insulate from cold weather, at any time if they elect to do so. After recovering from a near-fatal skull fracture that he had sustained playing for Chelsea FC in 2006, Petr Čech wore a rugby-style scrum cap during his matches for the rest of his playing career.

== Careers and injuries ==
Goalkeepers have a very physically demanding job. They are the only players allowed to use their hands, except for throw-ins. Because of this, goalkeepers are often injured during breakaways, corner kicks, and free kicks since they put their bodies on the line. Several famous goalkeepers have been injured in ways their counterparts could not possibly sustain. For example, Petr Čech received a head injury after colliding with another player during a 2006 game; a couple of months later he debuted wearing a rugby-style headpiece, a practice that he would continue to follow for the rest of his career. However, some goalkeepers manage to avoid injury and continue to play, many not retiring until their late 30s or early 40s. Notably, Peter Shilton played for 31 years between 1966 and 1997 before retiring at the age of 47.

In general, goalkeepers can sustain any injury to which their outfield counterparts are vulnerable. Common lower and upper extremity injuries include cartilage tears, anterior cruciate ligament tears, and knee sprains. On the other hand, goalkeepers rarely fall victim to fatigue-related injuries, such as leg cramps, pulled hamstrings, and dehydration. Shoulder injuries can be caused by heavy contact with the ground and can cause significant long-term injuries as loss of the range of motion can cause a complete inability to do their job. Vedran Janjetovic suffered such a contact injury playing in an A-League match on 25 January 2019 after diving to make a save. After playing nine games on painkilling injections, he underwent experimental surgery that required a two-and-a-half-year recovery and caused him to miss two entire seasons.

== Records ==
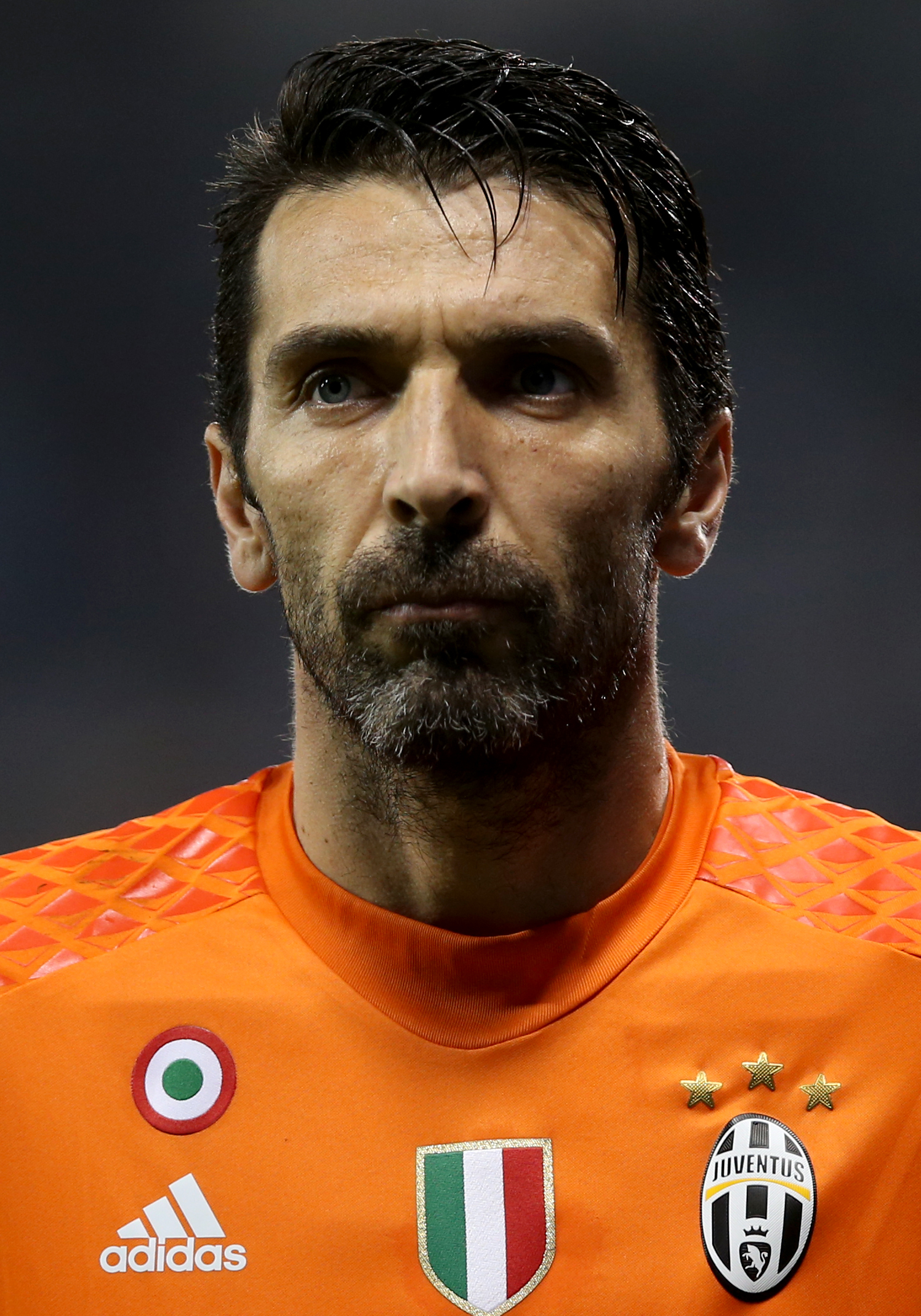
Gianluigi Buffon is the only goalkeeper to have won the UEFA Club Footballer of the Year Award.

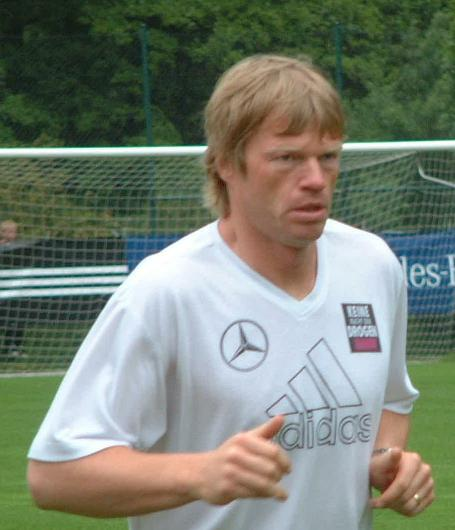
Oliver Kahn, the only goalkeeper to win the FIFA World Cup Golden Ball award

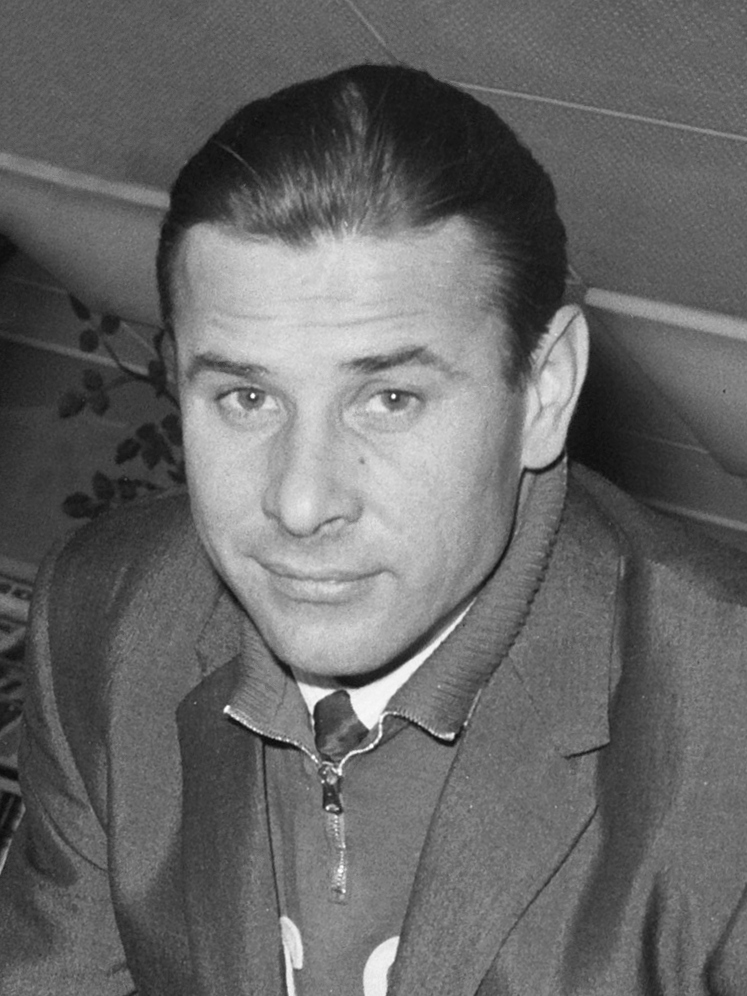
Lev Yashin, the only goalkeeper to win the Ballon d'Or

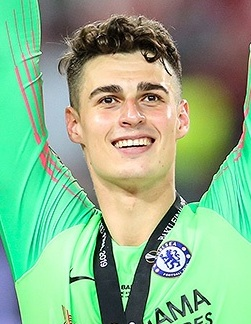
Kepa Arrizabalaga, the world's most expensive goalkeeper, having moved from Athletic Bilbao to Chelsea for €80 million in 2018

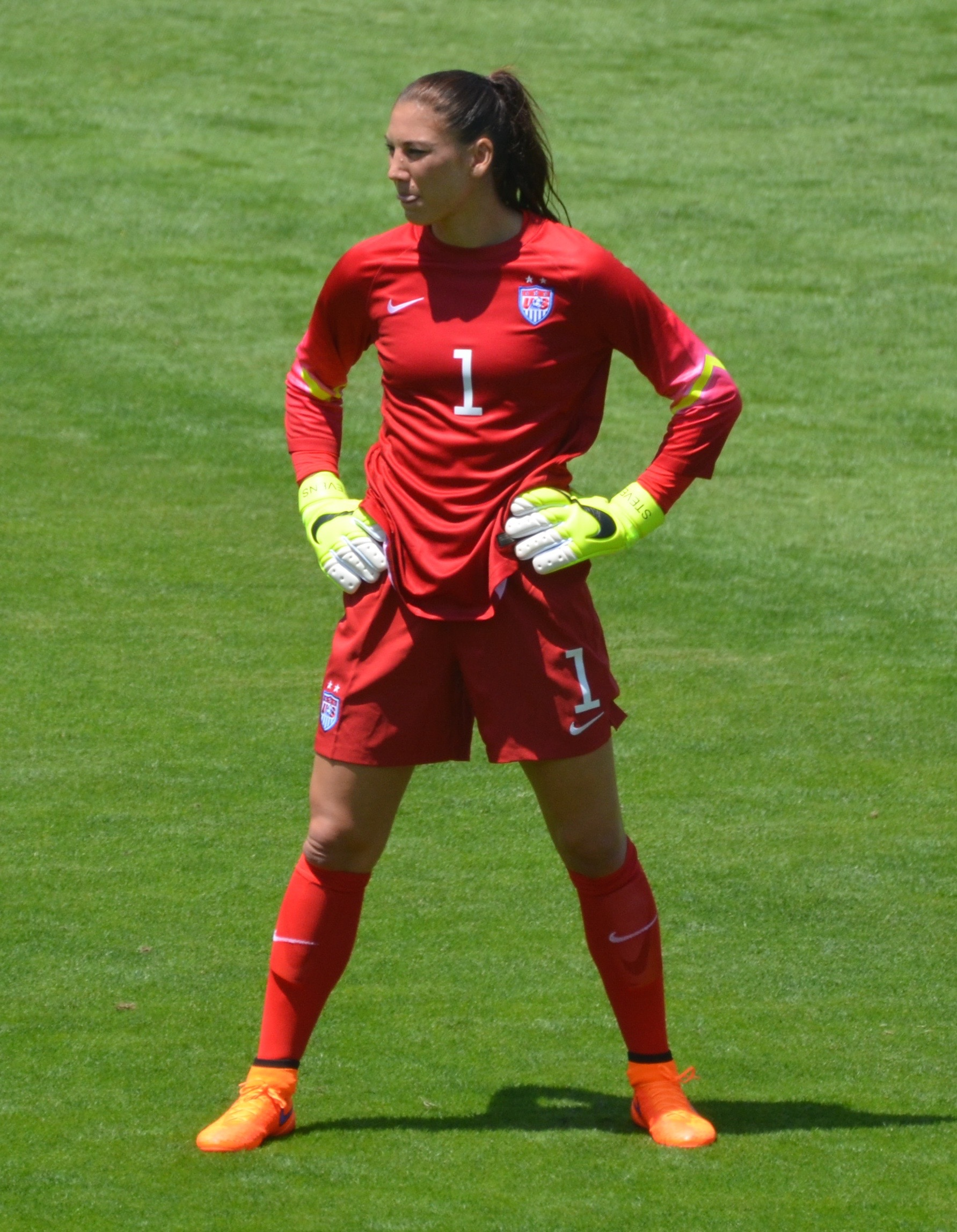
Hope Solo, who shares with Iker Casillas the record for most international clean sheets by any goalkeeper, with 102

Goalkeepers are crucial in penalty shoot-outs. The record for most penalties saved in a shoot-out is held solely by Ugandan Denis Onyango. He saved five penalty shootout kicks to help his club, Mamelodi Sundowns edge Cape Town City 3–2 on penalties at the MTN 8 tournament in South Africa in October 2021.

The second spot is shared by Helmut Duckadam of Steaua București in the 1986 European Cup Final against Barcelona, and Ciarán Kelly for Sligo Rovers against Shamrock Rovers in the 2010 FAI Cup Final, both of whom saved all four penalties faced.

Ray Clemence holds the record for the most clean sheets in the history of football, with 460 in more than 1000 official matches.

Stefano Tacconi is the only goalkeeper to have won all official club competitions for which he was eligible. Goalkeeper Ned Doig, who spent most of his career with Sunderland, set a 19th-century world record by not conceding any goals in 87 of his 290 top-division appearances (30%).

Rogério Ceni has scored the most goals for a goalkeeper, having recorded 131 goals through free kicks and penalties across his 23-year career. Tony Read and José Luis Chilavert are the only goalkeepers to score a hat-trick (three goals in a game), with all three goals coming from penalty kicks.

Gianluigi Buffon is the only goalkeeper to have won the UEFA Club Footballer of the Year Award. Oliver Kahn holds the record for most UEFA Best Club Goalkeeper and Best European Goalkeeper Awards, with four. Iker Casillas holds the record for most appearances by a goalkeeper in the FIFPro World11 and in the UEFA Team of the Year, as well as most IFFHS World's Best Goalkeeper Awards, alongside Buffon and Manuel Neuer, winning the award for five consecutive years between 2008 and 2012. Casillas held the record for the most clean sheets in UEFA Champions League history until being overtaken by Neuer on April 17, 2024. He also held the most number of appearances in the competition until Cristiano Ronaldo overtook him on September 30, 2021.

At the international level, Dino Zoff has remained unbeaten for the longest period at 1142 minutes. Nadine Angerer set the record for longest unbeaten run during a World Cup tournament at 540 minutes while winning the world title without conceding a goal. Walter Zenga holds the record for the longest unbeaten run in the Men's FIFA World Cup tournament at 517 minutes. Fabien Barthez and Peter Shilton hold the record for most clean sheets in World Cup matches, with ten each. Mohamed Al-Deayea holds the record for most international caps by a male goalkeeper, with 178 official appearances for Saudi Arabia. Hope Solo of the United States holds the record for most international caps by a female goalkeeper, with 202 appearances.

Oliver Kahn is the only goalkeeper to have won the Adidas Golden Ball for the best player of the tournament in a World Cup doing so in 2002. Lev Yashin is the only goalkeeper to have won the Ballon d'Or, given to the best player of the year. In 2021, Gianluigi Donnarumma became the first goalkeeper to win the player of the tournament award at UEFA Euro 2020. Gianluca Pagliuca of Italy became the first goalkeeper to be sent off in a World Cup finals match, dismissed for handling outside his area against Norway in 1994. His team went on to win 1–0 and reached the final before losing to Brazil in a penalty shoot-out (the first time a World Cup final was decided by penalties), in which Pagliuca became the first goalkeeper ever to stop a penalty in a World Cup Final shoot-out.

Iker Casillas holds both the record for the fewest goals conceded in a UEFA European Championship (only one in 2012), and the record for the longest unbeaten run at a European Championship, beating the previous record held by Dino Zoff. He also holds the record for most international clean sheets (102) by a male goalkeeper, beating the previous record held by Edwin van der Sar (72), and became the first goalkeeper in history, male or female, to keep 100 clean sheets at international level in 2015; he also shares with Hope Solo the overall men's and women's record for most international clean sheets. Buffon holds the record for most minutes without conceding a goal in European Championship qualifying matches at 644.

On 26 February 1983, Pat Jennings became the first player to make 1,000 senior appearances in English football. In the 1986 World Cup, held in Mexico, he was turning 41, making him the World Cup's oldest-ever participant at the time. In 1976, PFA awarded him the Players' Player of the Year award making him the first goalkeeper to ever receive this accolade.

=== Highest transfer fees ===
Before the 21st century, goalkeepers generally commanded far lower transfer fees than outfield players; as of 1992 the highest transfer fee paid by a British club for an outfield player was £2.9 million but the record for a goalkeeper was less than half that figure at £1.3 million.

As of July 2025, the most expensive goalkeeper of all time is Kepa Arrizabalaga, following his 2018 €80 million (£71 million) transfer to Chelsea from Athletic Bilbao.

Rank	Player	From	To	Fee (£)	Fee (€)	Year
1	(Spain) Kepa Arrizabalaga	(Spain) Athletic Bilbao	(England) Chelsea	£71m	€80m	2018
2	(Brazil) Alisson	(Italy) Roma	(England) Liverpool	£66.8m	€72.5m	2018
3	(Cameroon) André Onana	(Italy) Internazionale	(England) Manchester United	£43.8m (Note: £43.8m plus £3.4m bonuses) (Note: Reported figure)	€52.5m	2023
4	(Italy) Gianluigi Buffon	(Italy) Parma	(Italy) Juventus	£33m	€51.646m (Note: Part of the fees was paid via the transfer of Jonathan Bachini to Parma for a total of 100 billion lire; the fixed exchange rate of lira to euro was 1936.27 lire to 1 euro.)	2001
5	(Brazil) Ederson	(Portugal) Benfica	(England) Manchester City	£35m	€40m	2017
6	(Belgium) Thibaut Courtois	(England) Chelsea	(Spain) Real Madrid	£35m	€35m	2018
7	(Netherlands) Jasper Cillessen	(Spain) Barcelona	(Spain) Valencia	£31.4m	€35m	2019
8	(England) Jordan Pickford	(England) Sunderland	(England) Everton	£25m (Note: £25m plus £5m bonuses)		2017
9	(Italy) Francesco Toldo	(Italy) Fiorentina	(Italy) Internazionale		€28.405m (Note: 55 billion lire; Toldo and Rui Costa were originally signed by Parma for a total of 140 billion lire; they were re-sold from Parma to Inter and Milan respectively after the two players refused to join Parma)	2001
10	(England) Aaron Ramsdale	(England) Sheffield United	(England) Arsenal	£24m (Note: £25m plus £6m in potential add-ons)	€28m	2021

== See also ==
Awards

- Best European Goalkeeper
- FIFA World Cup All-Star Teams
- Golden Glove awards
- IFFHS World's Best Goalkeeper
- The Best FIFA Goalkeeper
- UEFA Best Club Goalkeeper Award

Other

- Association football positions
- List of goalscoring goalkeepers
- List of most expensive association football transfers
- List of outfield association footballers who played in goal
