= Adam Smith-Neale =

English darts player (born 1993)

Personal information
- Nickname: "Big Dog"
- Born: 29 October 1993 (age 32) Coventry, England
- Home town: Nuneaton, England

Sport
- Sport: Darts
- Playing since: 2010
- Darts: 22g Red Dragon
- Laterality: Right-handed
- Walk-on music: "Big Dog" by Akon

Organisation (see split in darts)
- BDO: 2018–2020
- PDC: 2010–present (Tour Card: 2011–2012, 2023–2024)
- WDF: 2022

WDF major events – best performances
- World Championship: Last 32: 2020
- World Masters: Winner (1): 2018
- World Trophy: Last 32: 2019

PDC premier events – best performances
- UK Open: Last 96: 2012
- Grand Slam: Group Stage: 2018
- European Championship: Last 32: 2021

Other tournament wins
- Years
PDC Challenge Tour	2021
Youth events
PDC Development Tour	2012

Adam Smith-Neale (born 29 October 1993) is an English professional darts player who plays in Professional Darts Corporation (PDC) events. He won a Challenge Tour in 2021 and was the 2018 BDO World Masters champion.

== Darts career ==
=== Early career ===
Smith-Neale started playing in the PDC at the age of 17 in 2011 when he entered the World Youth Championships and lost in the last 64 to Lewis Venes. The following January Smith-Neale entered Q School and after making the last 16 all four days he was given a two-year tour card to play the Pro tour. Through those 2 years Smith-Neale split his time between playing on the main tour and on the Youth tour, on the main tour he failed to make an impact and only made one TV major which was the 2012 UK Open where he made the last 96. On the Youth tour however Smith-Neale had much more success where he managed to finish the 2011 season 9th in the Rankings which qualified him for the 2012 PDC World Youth Championship where he again went out at the last 64 stage.

In 2012 Smith-Neale won his first PDC tournament when he won Event 7 of the Youth tour and finished the season in 14th qualifying for the 2013 PDC World Youth Championship where he went out in the first round.

After not making the top 64 of the PDC Order of Merit by the end of 2012, Smith-Neale lost his tour card and went to Q-School again. He failed to gain a tour card in 2013, 14, 15, 17, but continued to play on the Challenge Tour and Development Tour during that time.

=== 2018 season ===
After failing to get a Tour Card at the start of the 2018 season, Smith–Neale started to play in more BDO events which lead him to qualify for the BDO World Masters. Not being a seed meant that he had to start the tournament at the first round but Smith–Neale won through the first 6 rounds on the floor to reach the stage finals. He defeated Aaron Turner 3–1 in the last 48, Daniel Day 3–0 in the last 32, Mark McGeeney 3–2 in the last 16, Wayne Warren 4–1 in the quarter–finals, Jim Williams 5–3 in the semi–final and BDO Number 1 Glen Durrant 6–4 in the final. Winning the World Masters meant Smith–Neale qualified for the 2019 BDO World Championship, and the 2018 Grand Slam of Darts.

=== 2019 ===
Prior to the 2019 BDO World Darts Championship, Smith-Neale suffered a broken leg in a fall following a tournament in Italy, with Smith-Neale admitting he was inebriated before the fall. He managed to play his preliminary round match, but did so on crutches, using both during his walk-on and using his right crutch while throwing his darts. He was beaten 3–0 by New Zealand's Mark McGrath.

=== 2023-present ===
He regained his tour card in 2023 after defeating Nick Kenny in the final on the last day of Q School, and played on the PDC circuit for the 2023 and 2024 seasons.

In March 2024, Smith-Neale was suspended by the Darts Regulation Authority following footage emerging of him punching an opponent during an amateur event in Nuneaton. In July 2024, he was given an eight-month ban from all DRA sanctioned events, backdated to start from 12 March.

After his suspension was completed in November, Smith-Neale entered the PDC Tour Card Holder Qualifiers to try and qualify for the 2025 PDC World Darts Championship. He lost in the first round of the qualifiers 6–5 to Rhys Griffin, who would go on to qualify for the tournament.

Smith-Neale turned his attentions to the PDC Challenge Tour after failing to retain his Tour Card at Q-School. He reached the quarterfinals at Challenge Tour 23 where he lost to the eventual winner Stefan Bellmont 5–1.

== World Championship results ==
=== BDO ===
- 2019: Preliminary round (lost to Mark McGrath 0–3)
- 2020: First round (lost to Paul Hogan 0–3)

== Performance timeline ==
=== BDO ===
Tournament	2016	2017	2018	2019	2020
BDO Ranked televised events
World Championship	PDC			Prel.	1R
World Trophy	PDC			1R	NH
World Masters	2R	PDC	W	2R	NH

=== PDC ===
Tournament	2011	2012	2013	2014	2015	2016	2017	2018	2020	2021	2023	2024
PDC Ranked televised events
UK Open	DNQ	2R	Did not qualify						2R	DNQ	1R	2R
European Championship	Did not qualify									1R	DNQ	
Grand Slam	Did not qualify							RR	Did not qualify			
PDC Non-ranked televised events
World Youth Championship	1R	1R	1R	1R	1R	2R	2R	Did not participate				
Career statistics
Year-end ranking	–					209	-	-	-	120	131	

==== European Tour ====
Tournament	2021	2023
Gibraltar Trophy	3R	NH
Dutch Championship	NH	1R
European Grand Prix	NH	2R

=== PDC Players Championships ===
Season	1	2	3	4	5	6	7	8	9	10	11	12	13	14	15	16	17	18	19	20	21	22	23	24	25	26	27	28	29	30
2023	BAR; 2R	BAR; 1R	BAR; 1R	BAR; 2R	BAR; 2R	BAR; 1R	HIL; DNP		WIG; 2R	WIG; 2R	LEI; 1R	LEI; 1R	HIL; 3R	HIL; 2R	LEI; 2R	LEI; 1R	HIL; 2R	HIL; 1R	BAR; 2R	BAR; 2R	BAR; 1R	BAR; 1R	BAR; 1R	BAR; 1R	BAR; 3R	BAR; 1R	BAR; 2R	BAR; 1R	BAR; 1R	BAR; 1R
2024	WIG; 3R	WIG; 3R	LEI; 1R	LEI; 2R	Did not participate																									

Key

Performance Table Legend
W	Won the tournament	F	Finalist	SF	Semifinalist	QF	Quarterfinalist	#R; RR; Prel.	Lost in # round Round-robin; Preliminary round	DQ	Disqualified
DNQ	Did not qualify	DNP	Did not participate	WD	Withdrew	NH	Tournament not held	#R; RR; Prel.	Lost in # round Round-robin; Preliminary round	NYF	Not yet founded

== Career finals ==
=== BDO major finals: 1 (1 titles) ===
Legend
World Masters (1–0)

Outcome	No.	Year	Championship	Opponent in the final	Score (Note: (l) = score in legs, (s) = score in sets.)
Winner	1.	2018	World Masters	Glen Durrant	6–4 (s)
