= PDC World Youth Championship =

Semi-professional darts tournament

World Youth Championship

Tournament information
- Venue: Finals only Alexandra Palace (2011); The O2 Arena (2012–14); Butlin's Resort, Minehead (2015–2019, 2021–); Ricoh Arena (2020)
- Location: London, England (2011–14); Minehead, England (2015–2019, 2021–); Coventry, England (2020)
- Established: 2010–2011
- Organisation(s): PDC
- Format: Legs
- Prize fund: £100,000 (2024)
- Month(s) Played: January (2011); May (2012–2014); November (2015–)

Current champion(s)
- (Netherlands) Gian van Veen

The PDC World Youth Championship is a tournament for darts players aged 16–23 organised by the Professional Darts Corporation (PDC). The early rounds of the tournament are played as a floor tournament, before the final is televised during a senior PDC major tournament. The first final, in 2011, was held during the senior World Championship and won by Arron Monk. Subsequent finals have been held on Premier League finals night and during the Players Championship Finals. Currently, the champion gains a qualification spot at the World Championship, while both finalists gain a spot at the next year's Grand Slam of Darts.

The reigning World Youth Champion is Gian van Veen, who successfully defended his 2024 title in the 2025 edition. He and Dimitri van den Bergh (the 2017 and 2018 champion) are the only players to have won the World Youth Championship twice. Three of the thirteen World Youth Champions (Michael Smith, Luke Humphries and Luke Littler) have gone on to become senior World Champions, while three more (Josh Rock, van den Bergh and van Veen) have won other televised PDC titles.

== Format ==
Currently, the World Youth Championship has a field of 128 players who compete in a group-and-knockout format. All rounds except the final are played as an untelevised floor tournament, with previous venues including the Robin Park Tennis Centre in Wigan and the Barnsley Metrodome. The final is played on the final day of the Players Championship Finals and broadcast on television.

All PDC tour card holders meeting the age requirement (currently being aged 23 or under at the start of the season) are automatically invited. Up to 32 further invitations (such as to youth players from international PDC Affiliate Tours or the Women's Series) can be offered by the PDC. The remaining places are taken filled using the Development Tour Order of Merit. 32 groups are formed, with the group winners progressing to the knockout stage. Each group contains a seed, with seeding based first on players' PDC Order of Merit rank and next on their Development Tour Order of Merit rank, should 32 players not have a ranking on the main Order of Merit. Matches are played as the best of nine legs in the group stage, and the best of eleven legs in the knockout stage.

== History ==
In late 2009, the PDC offered to purchase rival darts organisation, the British Darts Organisation (BDO), an offer which was rejected. Following the BDO's rejection of the buyout, the PDC chose to expand in the 2010 season by creating the World Cup of Darts, World Youth Championship and the short-lived PDC Women's World Darts Championship.

The knockout stages of the first edition of the World Youth Championship (then called the PDC World Under-21 Championship) were held in 2010, with the first final being held on 3 January 2011, the day of the senior final. The highest-ranked players under the age of 21 were invited to compete in the knockout, alongside international qualifiers and players who won competitions at Rileys sports bars. Michael van Gerwen and Arron Monk were the first finalists, with Monk winning the inaugural final 6–4. The game saw Monk go 5–4 ahead via an unusual 121 checkout with the first dart thrown at the 17 segment.

The final of the 2012 edition was held during Premier League finals night, an arrangement that remained for the 2013 and 2014 editions. Van Gerwen once again finished runner-up in 2012, losing to James Hubbard. Michael Smith and Keegan Brown were the next two champions, with Smith later becoming the first Youth World Champion to become a senior PDC World Champion.

In 2015, the age limit for entry was 23, rather than 21, and entry was aligned with the Development Tour. The tournament shifted to its current position in the calendar, with the final held on the final day of the Players Championship Finals. Here, Max Hopp became the first German (and first player from outside England) to win the World Youth Championship, beating Nathan Aspinall 6–5 in a tight final which remained on throw until the final leg, where both players had match darts. In 2016, Hopp's title defence was stopped by fellow German Martin Schindler, who himself was beaten by eventual champion Corey Cadby. In 2017, Dimitri van den Bergh won the title, becoming the first player to record a three-dart average over 100 in the final. He repeated this feat in 2018, becoming the first player to win the title twice. The 2018 tournament also saw a shift from the previous format of a straight knockout tournament to the inclusion of a group stage in the first round, as the tournament expanded to 96 players.

In 2019, Luke Humphries became the second future senior World Champion to win the World Youth Championship, beating 17-year-old Adam Gawlas, who qualified for the tournament despite having only played darts for nine months at the time. In 2020, the COVID-19 pandemic meant that the Players Championship Finals (and thus the World Youth Championship final) were moved from their regular location in Minehead to the Ricoh Arena in Coventry, where Bradley Brooks won the title. In 2021, the size of the field was reduced and the tournament was played on a single day in Minehead. Ted Evetts became the only player to win in the one-day format, as the tournament returned to its previous schedule in 2022. Northern Irish player and future World Cup winner Josh Rock broke the streak of English winners in 2022, recording the highest three-dart average in a World Youth Championship final to date, 104.13.

Rock's title defence in 2023 was ended by eventual runner-up Gian van Veen, who was defeated in the final by Luke Littler. Despite being eligible to compete until 2031, Littler opted not to defend his title in the 2024 edition, which expanded from 96 to 128 players. In Littler's absence, Gian van Veen became the first Dutch champion. Littler's 2025 World Championship victory meant that for the first time, the World Youth Champion was older than World Champion. Littler returned to the competition in 2025, but was unexpectedly defeated in a semi-final by Beau Greaves, who became the first female finalist. The Greaves–Littler match was notable for its quality, with both players averaging over 105 and Littler praising his rival on social media after the match, pointing out he had "two 10-dart legs, missed double 12 for a nine and still couldn’t win". Despite her semi-final performance, Greaves went on to lose the final to defending champion van Veen, who was appearing in a record third final. His victory made him the second player to defend the title.

== Finals ==
Year	Champion (average in final)	Score	Runner-up (average in final)	Prize money			Venue
Year	Champion (average in final)	Score	Runner-up (average in final)	Total	Champion	Runner-up	Venue
2011	(England) Arron Monk (93.03)	6–4	(Netherlands) Michael van Gerwen (87.06)	£30,000	£10,000	£5,000	Alexandra Palace, London
2012	(England) James Hubbard (95.18)	6–3	(Netherlands) Michael van Gerwen (92.30)	£30,000	£10,000	£5,000	The O2 Arena, London
2013	(England) Michael Smith (89.13)	6–1	(England) Ricky Evans (79.26)	£30,000	£10,000	£5,000	The O2 Arena, London
2014	(England) Keegan Brown (85.67)	6–4	(Austria) Rowby-John Rodriguez (79.80)	£50,000	£10,000	£5,000	The O2 Arena, London
2015	(Germany) Max Hopp (86.97)	6–5	(England) Nathan Aspinall (88.48)	£50,000	£10,000	£5,000	Butlin's Resort, Minehead
2016	(Australia) Corey Cadby (98.35)	6–2	(Netherlands) Berry van Peer (86.92)	£50,000	£10,000	£5,000	Butlin's Resort, Minehead
2017	(Belgium) Dimitri van den Bergh (101.23)	6–3	(England) Josh Payne (92.11)	£50,000	£10,000	£5,000	Butlin's Resort, Minehead
2018	(Belgium) Dimitri van den Bergh (100.44)	6–3	(Germany) Martin Schindler (91.60)	£60,000	£10,000	£5,000	Butlin's Resort, Minehead
2019	(England) Luke Humphries (92.97)	6–0	(Czech Republic) Adam Gawlas (78.42)	£60,000	£10,000	£5,000	Butlin's Resort, Minehead
2020	(England) Bradley Brooks (81.63)	6–5	(England) Joe Davis (78.16)	£60,000	£10,000	£5,000	Ricoh Arena, Coventry
2021	(England) Ted Evetts (95.44)	6–4	(Northern Ireland) Nathan Rafferty (93.66)	£45,000	£10,000	£5,000	Butlin's Resort, Minehead
2022	(Northern Ireland) Josh Rock (104.13)	6–1	(Scotland) Nathan Girvan (89.12)	£60,000	£10,000	£5,000	Butlin's Resort, Minehead
2023	(England) Luke Littler (102.16)	6–4	(Netherlands) Gian van Veen (97.48)	£60,000	£10,000	£5,000	Butlin's Resort, Minehead
2024	(Netherlands) Gian van Veen (97.48)	6–5	(Netherlands) Jurjen van der Velde (98.04)	£100,000	£12,000	£6,000	Butlin's Resort, Minehead
2025	(Netherlands) Gian van Veen (96.55)	6–3	(England) Beau Greaves (90.42)	£100,000	£12,000	£6,000	Butlin's Resort, Minehead
