= 2014 PDC World Youth Championship =

2014 PDC Unicorn World Youth Championship

Tournament information
- Dates: 5 April 2014; 22 May 2014 (final)
- Venue: The O2 Arena
- Location: London
- Country: England
- Organisation(s): PDC
- Format: Legs first to 6
- Prize fund: £50,000
- Winner's share: £10,000

Champion(s)
- (England) Keegan Brown

The 2014 PDC Unicorn World Youth Championship was the fourth edition of the PDC World Youth Championship, a tournament organised by the Professional Darts Corporation for darts players aged between 16 and 21.

The knock-out stages from the last 64 to the semi-finals were played in Reading on 5 April 2014. The final took place on 22 May 2014, before the final of the 2014 Premier League Darts, which was shown live on Sky Sports.

2013 champion Michael Smith was not eligible to defend his title. Keegan Brown and Rowby-John Rodriguez contested the final at The O2 Arena, London, with Brown winning 6–4.

== Prize money ==
| Position (no. of players) | | Prize money (Total: £50,000) |
|---|---|---|
| Winner | (1) | £10,000 |
| Runner-up | (1) | £5,000 |
| Semi-finalists | (2) | £2,500 |
| Quarter-finalists | (4) | £1,500 |
| Third round | (8) | £1,000 |
| Second round | (16) | £500 |
| First round | (32) | £250 |

== Qualification ==
The tournament featured 64 players. The top 50 players in the PDC Challenge Tour Order of Merit automatically qualified for the tournament, with the top eight players being seeded. They were joined by 14 international qualifiers. Three players withdrew prior to the tournament, so their places were awarded through an open qualifier, which took place on 4 April.

The participants were:

1-50

1. (England) Adam Hunt
2. (Austria) Rowby-John Rodriguez
3. (Wales) Kurt Parry
4. (England) Josh Payne
5. (Netherlands) Dirk van Duijvenbode
6. (England) Reece Robinson
7. (Netherlands) Benito van de Pas
8. (Germany) Max Hopp
9. (Netherlands) Ryan de Vreede
10. ~~(England) Sam Hewson~~
11. (England) Sam Head
12. (Belgium) Dimitri Van den Bergh
13. (England) Jake Patchett
14. (England) Keegan Brown
15. (Netherlands) John de Kruijf
16. (England) Tom Sykes
17. (England) Dan Dean
18. (England) Shaun Littler
19. (England) Brandon Walsh
20. (England) Arron Fairweather
21. (England) Rhys Hayden
22. (Scotland) Ryan Hogarth
23. (England) Aden Kirk
24. (England) Lewis Venes
25. (England) Sam Hill
26. (England) James Thompson
27. (Netherlands) Kevin Voornhout
28. (England) Ben Songhurst
29. (England) Nicholas Day
30. (Netherlands) Jimmy Hendriks
31. (England) George Killington
32. (Republic of Ireland) Paddy Meaney
33. (England) Adam Smith-Neale
34. (England) Curtis Turner
35. (England) Lee Whitworth
36. (Republic of Ireland) Dean Finn
37. (England) Shaun Lovett
38. (Scotland) Sean Ryan
39. (Republic of Ireland) John Seagrave
40. (Wales) Sion Thomas
41. (England) Dan Read
42. (England) Anthony West
43. (Scotland) James Young
44. (England) Lewis Hackett
45. (England) Matthew Dicken
46. (England) Jack Tweddell
47. ~~(England) Conor Mayes~~
48. (England) Samuel Fuller
49. (England) Jake Jones
50. ~~(Spain) Sergio Garcia~~

International qualifiers

- (India) Amit Gilitwala
- (Austria) Fredi Gselmann
- (Australia) Tyson Hoefel
- (Australia) Robbie King
- (Finland) Aaron Knox
- (Australia) Adam Leek
- (United States) Dan Lauby Jr
- (Republic of Ireland) Steve Lennon
- (Italy) Vincenzo Masciarelli
- (Canada) Shaun Narain
- (Malaysia) Eric Pedley
- (Republic of Ireland) Andrew Ryan
- (Germany) Martin Schindler
- (Germany) Justin Webers
- (Netherlands) Mike Zuydwijk

Open Qualifiers

- (England) Rees Hall
- (Wales) Dean Reynolds
- (England) Cain Unwin

Celtic Nations Qualifiers

- (Republic of Ireland) Stephen Rosney
- (Isle of Man) Callum Brew

== Draw ==
Preliminary round

- (England) Aden Kirk 6 – 4 Callum Brew (Isle of Man)
- (Republic of Ireland) Stephen Rosney 5 – 6 Ryan de Vreede (Netherlands)
- (Australia) Robbie King 6 – 2 Adam Leek (Australia)

First round (best of 11 legs); 5 April
1 | (England) Adam Hunt | 6
(England) Aden Kirk | 1
(England) Shaun Littler | 6
(England) Lewis Hackett | 2
(England) Adam Smith-Neale | 5
(England) Sam Hill | 6
(Wales) Sion Thomas | 4
(Netherlands) Kevin Voornhout | 6
8 | (Germany) Max Hopp | 5
(Netherlands) Ryan de Vreede | 6
(Republic of Ireland) Steve Lennon | 5
(Scotland) James Young | 6
(Australia) Robbie King | 6
(England) Jake Jones | 2
(England) Shaun Lovett | 2
(England) Keegan Brown | 6
5 | (Netherlands) Dirk van Duijvenbode | 6
(England) Samuel Fuller | 4
(England) Arron Fairweather | 6
(Austria) Fredi Gselmann | 1
(England) Brandon Walsh | 6
(Scotland) Sean Ryan | 4
(England) George Killington | 6
(Scotland) Ryan Hogarth | 4
4 | (England) Josh Payne | 6
(England) Matthew Dicken | 4
(Italy) Vincenzo Masciarelli | 0
(Australia) Tyson Hoefel | 6
(England) Jack Tweddell | 6
(Finland) Aaron Knox | 3
(Canada) Shaun Narain | 6
(England) Dan Dean | 3
2 | (Austria) Rowby-John Rodriguez | 6
(Republic of Ireland) John Seagrave | 1
(England) Tom Sykes | 6
(Malaysia) Eric Pedley | 4
(India) Amit Gilitwala | 0
(England) Jake Patchett | 6
(England) Ben Songhurst | 6
(England) Dan Read | 4
7 | (Netherlands) Benito van de Pas | 4
(Netherlands) Jimmy Hendriks | 6
(England) Anthony West | 5
(England) Rees Hall | 6
(England) Lee Whitworth | 2
(Wales) Dean Reynolds | 6
(United States) Dan Lauby Jr | 3
(Netherlands) Mike Zuydwijk | 6
6 | (England) Reece Robinson | 6
(England) Rhys Hayden | 3
(England) Curtis Turner | 1
(Germany) Martin Schindler | 6
(Republic of Ireland) Paddy Meaney | 5
(Belgium) Dimitri Van den Bergh | 6
(England) Nicholas Day | 6
(England) Sam Head | 2
3 | (Wales) Kurt Parry | 6
(Republic of Ireland) Andrew Ryan | 2
(England) Lewis Venes | 6
(Republic of Ireland) Dean Finn | 5
(Germany) Justin Webers | 6
(Netherlands) John de Kruijf | 5
(England) Cain Unwin | 6
(England) James Thompson | 5

Second round (best of 11 legs); 5 April
1 | (England) Adam Hunt | 6
(England) Shaun Littler | 3
(England) Sam Hill | 2
(Netherlands) Kevin Voornhout | 6
(Netherlands) Ryan de Vreede | 6
(Scotland) James Young | 5
(Australia) Robbie King | 0
(England) Keegan Brown | 6
5 | (Netherlands) Dirk van Duijvenbode | 6
(England) Arron Fairweather | 1
(England) Brandon Walsh | 6
(England) George Killington | 4
4 | (England) Josh Payne | 6
(Australia) Tyson Hoefel | 2
(England) Jack Tweddell | 6
(Canada) Shaun Narain | 2
2 | (Austria) Rowby-John Rodriguez | 6
(England) Tom Sykes | 0
(England) Jake Patchett | 5
(England) Ben Songhurst | 6
(Netherlands) Jimmy Hendriks | 6
(England) Rees Hall | 2
(Wales) Dean Reynolds | 6
(Netherlands) Mike Zuijdwijk | 5
6 | (England) Reece Robinson | 6
(Germany) Martin Schindler | 4
(Belgium) Dimitri Van den Bergh | 6
(England) Nicholas Day | 1
3 | (Wales) Kurt Parry | 6
(England) Lewis Venes | 1
(Germany) Justin Webers | 1
(England) Cain Unwin | 6

Third round (best of 11 legs); 5 April
1 | (England) Adam Hunt | 6
(Netherlands) Kevin Voornhout | 4
(Netherlands) Ryan de Vreede | 2
(England) Keegan Brown | 6
5 | (Netherlands) Dirk van Duijvenbode | 6
(England) Brandon Walsh | 1
4 | (England) Josh Payne | 4
(England) Jack Tweddell | 6
2 | (Austria) Rowby-John Rodriguez | 6
(England) Ben Songhurst | 3
(Netherlands) Jimmy Hendriks | 3
(Wales) Dean Reynolds | 6
6 | (England) Reece Robinson | 6
(Belgium) Dimitri Van den Bergh | 3
3 | (Wales) Kurt Parry | 6
(England) Cain Unwin | 4

Quarter-finals (best of 11 legs); 5 April
1 | (England) Adam Hunt | 3
(England) Keegan Brown | 6
5 | (Netherlands) Dirk van Duijvenbode | 6
(England) Jack Tweddell | 5
2 | (Austria) Rowby-John Rodriguez | 6
(Wales) Dean Reynolds | 2
6 | (England) Reece Robinson | 3
3 | (Wales) Kurt Parry | 6

Semi-finals (best of 11 legs); 5 April
(England) Keegan Brown | 6
5 | (Netherlands) Dirk van Duijvenbode | 2
2 | (Austria) Rowby-John Rodriguez | 6
3 | (Wales) Kurt Parry | 3

Final (best of 11 legs); 22 May
(England) Keegan Brown | 6
2 | (Austria) Rowby-John Rodriguez | 4
