= Roundfort =

- Ecclesiastical parish
- Location in Ireland
- Coordinates: 53°38′18″N 9°06′14″W
- Country: Ireland
- Province: Connacht
- County: County Mayo
- Time zone: UTC+0 (WET)
  - Summer (DST): UTC-1 (IST (WEST))

Roundfort (Irish: Lios na Maothaile) is a Catholic parish in County Mayo, Ireland. The parish church, the Church of the Immaculate Conception, is within the Roman Catholic Archdiocese of Tuam. Other amenities in the area include a national (primary) school (Roundfort National School), a playschool and a pub.

Roundfort is approximately 3 km (2 mi) south of Hollymount and 9 km (6 mi) east of Ballinrobe. The River Robe runs through the area. The parish has views of the Partry Mountains.

== Notable people ==
- Delia Murphy, singer and ballad collector
- Ciaran Kelly, League of Ireland goalkeeper
- Martin Heneghan, darts player
