= Keegan Brown =

English darts player (born 1992)

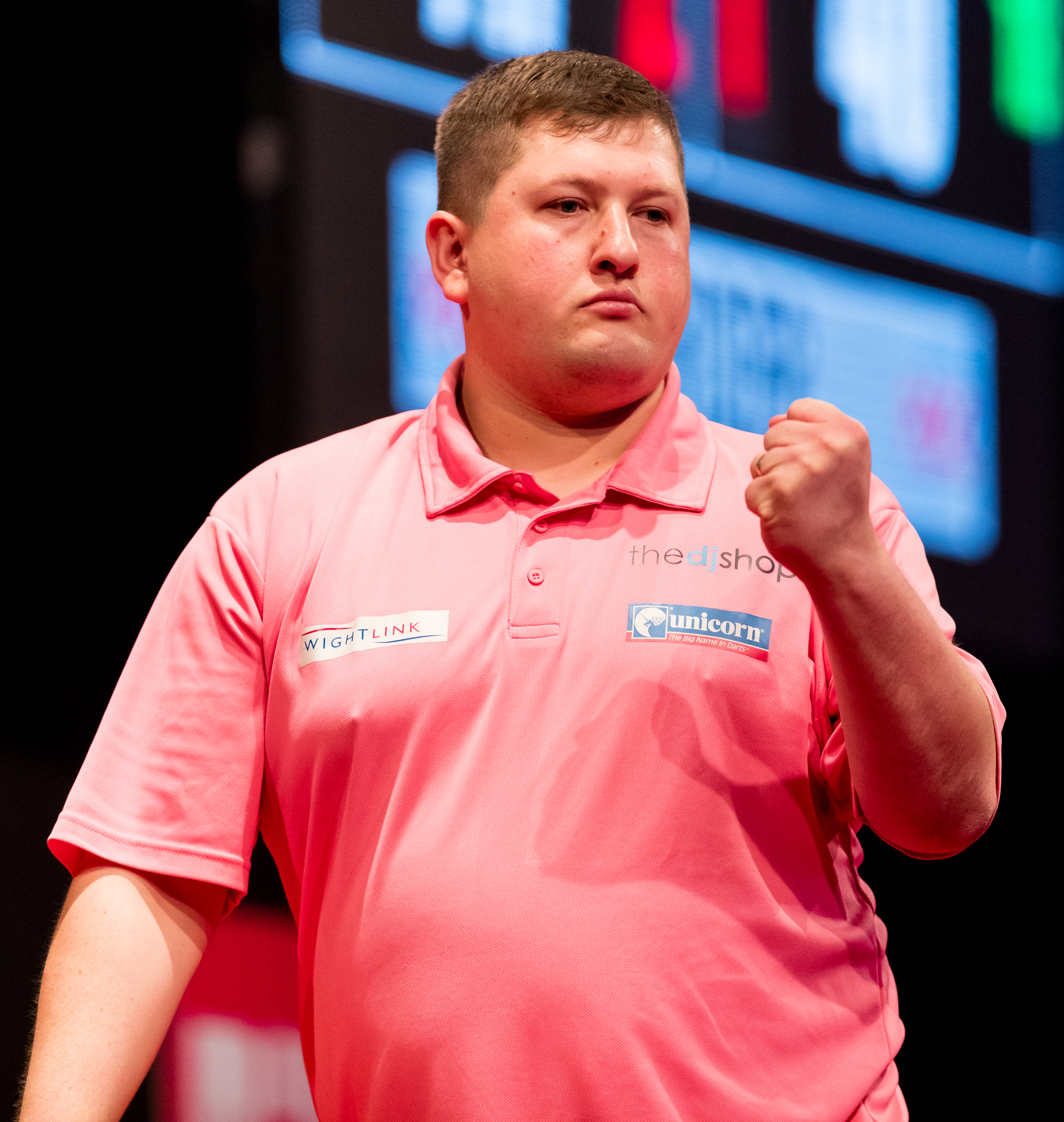
- Brown in 2019

Personal information
- Full name: Marc Keegan Brown
- Nickname: "The Needle"
- Born: 5 November 1992 (age 34) Durham, England
- Home town: Newport, Isle of Wight, England

Sport
- Sport: Darts
- Playing since: 2009
- Darts: 22g Red Dragon Signature
- Laterality: Right Handed
- Walk-on music: "Don't Stop Me Now" by Queen

Organisation (see split in darts)
- PDC: 2011–present (Tour Card: 2012–2024)

PDC premier events – best performances
- World Championship: Last 16: 2018
- World Matchplay: Last 16: 2015, 2019
- World Grand Prix: Last 32: 2015, 2019
- UK Open: Last 32: 2018, 2019
- Grand Slam: Quarter-final: 2014
- European Championship: Last 32: 2019
- PC Finals: Last 32: 2015, 2018, 2019
- World Series Finals: Quarter-final: 2023

Other tournament wins
- Years
PDC World Youth Championship	2014
PDC Youth Tour (x2)	2012, 2014
MODUS Super Series: Series 12 Week 2	2025
Players Championships (x2)
2015, 2022

Other achievements
- 2014 PDC Young Player of the Year

Marc Keegan Brown (born 5 November 1992) is an English professional darts player who competes in Professional Darts Corporation (PDC) events. He has won two ranking PDC Players Championship titles. Brown reached the quarter-finals at the 2014 Grand Slam of Darts and the 2023 World Series Finals.

In his youth career, Brown won the 2014 PDC World Youth Championship.

== Career ==
=== Early career ===
Brown began playing darts at the age of nine and was playing in men's county league games for the Isle of Wight at the age of 13. He qualified for the 2011 PDC Under-21 World Championship but lost to Michael van Gerwen 2–4 in the last 64.

In January 2012, Brown entered the Professional Darts Corporation's Q-School event in an attempt to earn a two-year tour card. He achieved this by finishing seventh on the Order of Merit after the four days of play, comfortably inside the top 24 who won their places. He mainly concentrated his 2012 season around Youth Tour tournaments, winning the 14th event in September. However, he also posted some impressive results out of the handful of main tour events he did play, most notably in the fifth and sixth Players Championships. In the former he lost to Justin Pipe 2–6 in the last 16, and in the latter he defeated the likes of James Wade, Andy Hamilton and Terry Jenkins, before losing in the semi-finals 1–6 to Dave Chisnall.

Brown entered 2013 ranked world number 86. He lost 3–5 to Joey Palfreyman in the second round of the UK Open having beaten Keith Rooney and Shaun Griffiths in prior rounds. Brown played a combination of Challenge Tour and ProTour events during the year with his deepest run on the main tour coming at the ninth Players Championship in October, which was highlighted by a second round 6–1 victory over Phil Taylor, before he was beaten 2–6 in last 16 by Mark Dudbridge.

=== 2014 ===
Brown's tour card expired at the start of 2014 and with him being ranked 102nd in the world, well outside of the top 64 who retain their places, he once again entered Q School. Brown lost in the final round on the first day 3–5 to Kyle Anderson, but a further defeat in the last 16 on the third day saw him finish tied second on the Q School Order of Merit to earn a fresh two-year tour card. Brown was beaten 3–5 by Austria's Mensur Suljović in the second round of the 2014 UK Open. In the quarter-finals of the seventh Players Championship event, Brown averaged an incredible 112.32 to beat Ben Ward 6–1, sealing his win with a 10-darter. He then defeated Peter Wright 6–5 to make his first PDC final and missed four darts for the title against Robert Thornton in a 5–6 loss.

In May, Brown won the World Youth Championship 6–4 against Rowby-John Rodriguez at the O2 Arena in London as part of the Premier League finals night. The title secured Brown's place in the 2014 Grand Slam of Darts and 2015 World Championship. At the Grand Slam he lost 1–5 to Dave Chisnall in his opening group game, but then averaged 100.60 in eliminating two-time world champion Adrian Lewis 5–1, and defeated Rodriguez 5–3 to reach the last 16. He faced five-time world champion Raymond van Barneveld and raced into a 9–3 lead to stand just one leg away from the quarter-finals in his first televised event. However, Brown missed a total of five match darts as Van Barneveld closed the gap to 9–7, before he missed three darts in the next leg to allow Brown in to take out 122 on the bull to seal a 10–7 win. He also started well in the last eight against Dave Chisnall, as he held 8–2 and 12–6 leads. However, Brown could not hold on when his opponent began fighting back as Chisnall levelled at 14–14 and ended Brown's tournament with a 14–16 win.

=== 2015 ===
Brown was drawn to face John Part in the first round of the 2015 World Championship, with the match going into a final set after Brown had led 2–0. He took it without reply to win 3–2 and advance to the second round. There, five of the six sets against Adrian Lewis went to deciding legs, with Lewis getting the better of Brown in a 4–2 win. He entered the top 64 on the Order of Merit for the first time afterwards, as the world number 52. Brown was named the PDC's Young Player of the Year at the annual awards dinner. He lost 2–9 to Nathan Derry in the third round of the UK Open. Brown reached the final of the eighth Players Championship and took out a pair of 130 finishes as he averaged 111.72 in defeating Lewis 6–3 to claim his first professional title.

Brown made his debut in the World Matchplay and he started very well to be 5–1 ahead of Robert Thornton and went on to win 10–7. He relinquished an 8–5 advantage over Dave Chisnall in the second round as he was beaten 11–13. Brown also qualified for the World Grand Prix for the first time and lost 1–2 in sets to Michael van Gerwen in the opening round. He needed a win over James Wade in his final group game at the Grand Slam to advance to the second round but lost 2–5, and from 4–4 in the first round of the Players Championship Finals he lost 4–6 to Michael van Gerwen, having missed deciding darts in both of the last two games.

=== 2016 ===
Brown could only win two legs in the first round of the 2016 World Championship during a 0–3 defeat to Peter Wright. He could not win enough matches to qualify for the UK Open. His only quarter-final on the Pro Tour in 2016 was at the fifth Players Championship and he lost 3–6 to Michael van Gerwen. Brown was defeated 3−4 by Aden Kirk in the final of the 11th Development Tour event. He qualified for the Players Championship Finals and lost 5–6 to Ian White in the first round, missing three match darts in the process. Brown could not play in his third successive World Championship as he was knocked out in the fourth round of the qualifier 4–5 by Mark Frost.

=== 2018 ===
Brown made it through to the last 16 of the 2018 PDC World Darts Championship, defeating James Wade on route, where he faced Phil Taylor. Brown stated he intended on ending Taylor's career in the match. Taylor won the match comprehensively, 0–4.

=== 2019 ===
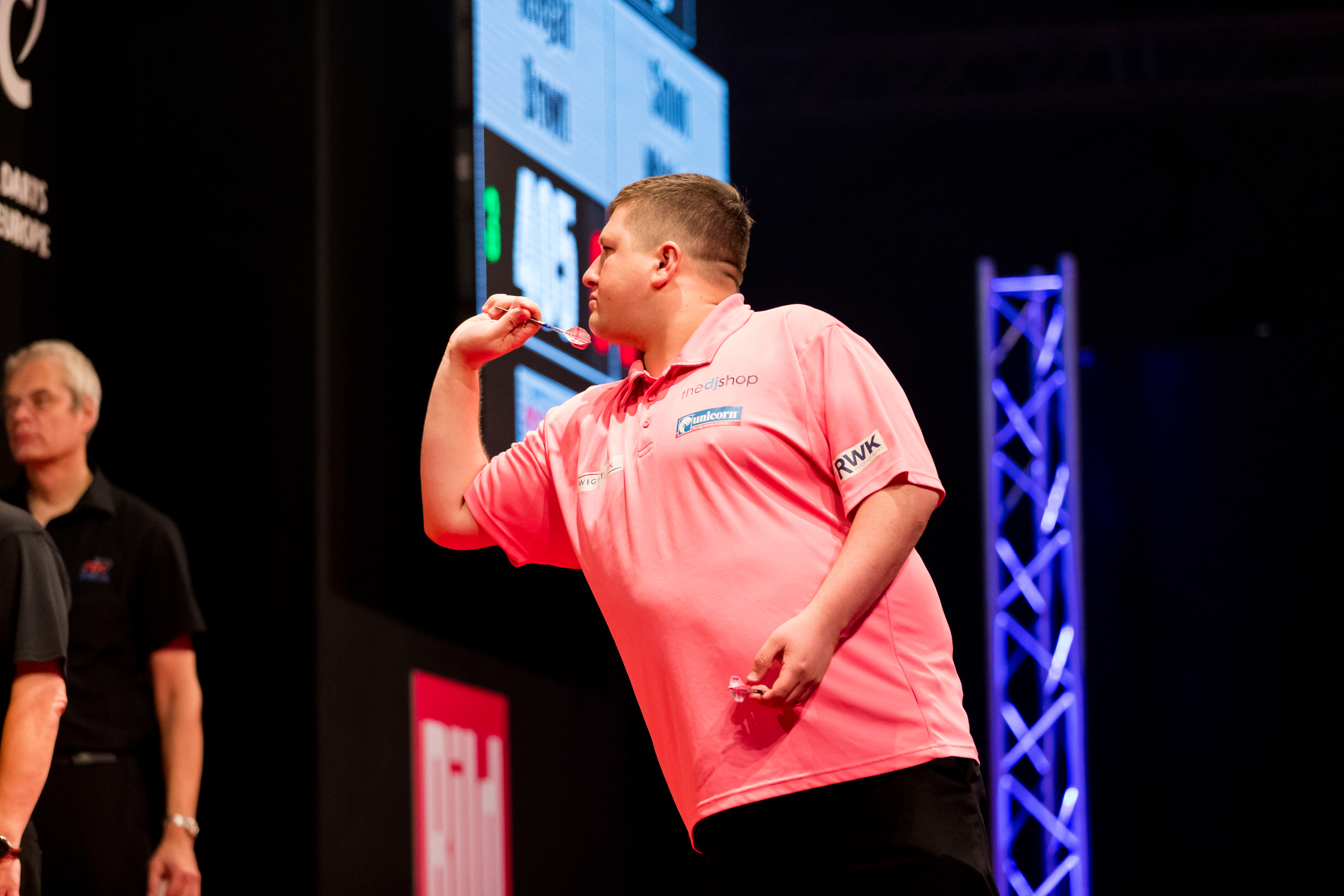
Brown during the 2019 European Darts Matchplay

Brown lost 4–3 to James Wade in the third round of the 2019 PDC World Darts Championship despite leading 3–1 in sets. Brown's first major of 2019 was the UK Open, where he entered at the last 96 because of his ranking. He defeated Nathan Derry 6–5, before beating William O'Connor 10–4 to move into the last 32. In a tight game all the way, Keegan was eventually defeated 8–10 by Steve Beaton.

In Players Championship 8 in March, Brown saw off Dave Chisnall, Christian Kist, Benito van de Pas, Cristo Reyes and Andy Boulton, before he was defeated 6–7 by Raymond van Barneveld in his first semi-final since September 2018.

Brown qualified for the German Darts Championship by defeating Peter Hudson 6–1 and Bradley Brooks 6–5 in the UK Qualifier. In the first round, he opened up a 5–2 lead against Madars Razma, but was pegged back to 5–5. However, Brown pinned a 116 checkout in the decider to set up a tie with world number 1 Michael van Gerwen. Brown, then world number 36, produced the performance of a lifetime to defy a 108 average from van Gerwen, and defeat him 6–4 with 100% on doubles. Keegan defeated James Wilson 6–0 in the last 16 with a 98 average, before defeating Gerwyn Price 6–5 in a thriller to qualify for his first Euro Tour semi-final; his opponent was fellow unseeded player, Ricky Evans. This game was one step too far for Brown as he lost 7–3, but his run to the semi-finals caused him to make the top 32 in the PDC Order of Merit for the first time.

=== 2020 ===
At the 2020 PDC World Darts Championship, Brown lost 3–2 to Seigo Asada in the second round.

=== 2021 ===
At the 2021 PDC World Darts Championship, Brown lost 3–1 to Dave Chisnall in the second round.

In November, Brown returned to County Darts to join Essex after an 11-year absence. He made his Essex debut away at Cheshire on 29 November, where he lost to Stuart Kellett 4–3. On 12 December, he earned his first victory in an Essex County shirt, beating Aaron Turner of Hampshire with a 4–0 win, recording a 29.91 average.

=== 2022 ===
Brown won his first Players Championship title in seven years, defeating Nathan Aspinall 8–7 in the final of Players Championship 23.

He appeared on Eggheads with Glen Durrant on 1 November 2022.

=== 2023 ===
At the 2023 PDC World Darts Championship, Brown lost 3–2 in the first round to Florian Hempel. This defeat meant he dropped out of the world's top 64 and lost his Tour Card but regained it at 2023 Q-School.

Brown qualified for the 2023 World Series of Darts Finals through the Tour Card Holder qualifier. He defeated Simon Whitlock in the first round before a surprise victory over defending champion Gerwyn Price, where Brown produced a 164 checkout to win the match 6–4. He was eliminated by Nathan Aspinall in the quarter-finals.

== Personal life ==
Brown is named after the footballer Kevin Keegan. He works as a medical lab assistant in blood services on the Isle of Wight. Brown increased his number of shifts at work in 2020 in order to help the National Health Service during the COVID-19 pandemic.

Brown has previously opened up about his battles with anxiety and depression.

== World Championship results ==
=== PDC ===
- 2015: Second round (lost to Adrian Lewis 2–4)
- 2016: First round (lost to Peter Wright 0–3)
- 2018: Third round (lost to Phil Taylor 0–4)
- 2019: Third round (lost to James Wade 3–4)
- 2020: Second round (lost to Seigo Asada 2–3)
- 2021: Second round (lost to Dave Chisnall 1–3)
- 2023: First round (lost to Florian Hempel 2–3)
- 2024: First round (lost to Boris Krcmar 1–3)

== Performance timeline ==
Tournament	2013	2014	2015	2016	2017	2018	2019	2020	2021	2022	2023	2024
PDC Ranked televised events
World Championship	DNP		2R	1R	DNQ	3R	3R	2R	2R	DNQ	1R	1R
UK Open	2R	2R	3R	DNQ	1R	4R	5R	4R	4R	3R	2R	2R
World Matchplay	DNP		2R	DNQ		1R	2R	1R	DNQ			
World Grand Prix	DNP		1R	DNQ			1R	DNQ				
European Championship	DNQ						1R	DNQ				
Grand Slam	DNP	QF	1R	DNQ		1R	DNQ					
Players Championship Finals	DNP		1R	1R	1R	2R	2R	1R	DNQ	1R	DNQ	
PDC Non-ranked televised events
World Series Finals	Not held		2R	DNQ		1R	DNQ				QF	DNQ
World Youth Championship	1R	W	1R	2R	Did not participate							
Year-end ranking	109	66	35	44	48	37	30	35	57	66	94	80

=== PDC European Tour ===
Season	1	2	3	4	5	6	7	8	9	10	11	12	13
2014	Did not qualify					EDO; 1R	EDG; DNQ	EDT; DNQ					
2015	GDC; DNQ	GDT; DNQ	GDM; 2R	DDM; DNQ	IDO; DNQ	EDO; WD	Did not qualify						
2016	Did not qualify							EDT; 2R	EDG; DNQ	GDC; DNQ			
2017	Did not qualify			EDG; 2R	Did not qualify					GDG; 2R	IDO; 2R	EDT; 3R	
2018	EDO; DNQ	GDG; QF	GDO; 1R	Did not qualify					EDM; 1R	Did not qualify			EDT; 1R
2019	EDO; DNQ	GDC; SF	GDG; 2R	GDO; DNQ	ADO; 3R	EDG; 3R	DDM; 1R	DDO; DNQ	CDO; SF	ADC; 3R	EDM; 2R	IDO; DNQ	GDT; 1R
2021	HDT; 1R	GDT; DNQ											
2022	IDO; DNQ	GDC; DNQ	GDG; QF	Did not qualify									GDT; 1R
2023	BSD; QF	EDO; DNQ	IDO; 1R	Did not qualify					EDG; 2R	Did not qualify			

=== PDC Players Championships ===
Season	1	2	3	4	5	6	7	8	9	10	11	12	13	14	15	16	17	18	19	20	21	22	23	24	25	26	27	28	29	30
2017	BAR; 4R	BAR; 1R	BAR; 1R	BAR; 2R	MIL; 3R	MIL; 2R	BAR; 3R	BAR; 1R	WIG; 1R	WIG; 1R	MIL; 2R	MIL; 4R	WIG; 2R	WIG; 1R	BAR; 1R	BAR; QF	BAR; 3R	BAR; 3R	DUB; 1R	DUB; 3R	BAR; QF	BAR; 1R								
2018	BAR; 4R	BAR; 3R	BAR; 1R	BAR; QF	MIL; 3R	MIL; 3R	BAR; 1R	BAR; 4R	WIG; 4R	WIG; 3R	MIL; 2R	MIL; 3R	WIG; 1R	WIG; 2R	BAR; 3R	BAR; 4R	BAR; 1R	BAR; 3R	DUB; 1R	DUB; SF	BAR; 1R	BAR; 1R								
2019	WIG; 1R	WIG; 2R	WIG; 1R	WIG; 2R	BAR; 2R	BAR; 3R	WIG; 4R	WIG; SF	BAR; 1R	BAR; 4R	BAR; 1R	BAR; 3R	BAR; 2R	BAR; 1R	BAR; 1R	BAR; 1R	WIG; 1R	WIG; 3R	BAR; 4R	BAR; 2R	HIL; 3R	HIL; 2R	BAR; 1R	BAR; 3R	BAR; 4R	BAR; 3R	DUB; 2R	DUB; 3R	BAR; 3R	BAR; 2R
2020	BAR; 2R	BAR; 3R	WIG; 3R	WIG; 1R	WIG; 3R	WIG; 1R	BAR; 2R	BAR; QF	MIL; 1R	MIL; 1R	MIL; 1R	MIL; 3R	MIL; 1R	NIE; 1R	NIE; 1R	NIE; 4R	NIE; 1R	NIE; 3R	COV; 2R	COV; 1R	COV; 1R	COV; 2R	COV; 2R							
2021	BOL; 1R	BOL; 1R	BOL; 2R	BOL; 2R	MIL; 2R	MIL; 1R	MIL; 1R	MIL; 1R	NIE; DNP				MIL; 2R	MIL; 1R	MIL; 1R	MIL; 1R	COV; 1R	COV; 2R	COV; QF	COV	BAR; 3R	BAR; 2R	BAR; 1R	BAR; 3R	BAR; 1R	BAR; 3R	BAR; 1R	BAR; 1R	BAR; 1R	BAR; 3R
2022	BAR; 1R	BAR; 2R	WIG; 2R	WIG; 4R	BAR; 1R	BAR; 1R	NIE; 1R	NIE; 2R	BAR; 1R	BAR; 4R	BAR; 1R	BAR; 4R	BAR; 1R	WIG; 1R	WIG; 1R	NIE; 1R	NIE; 3R	BAR; 1R	BAR; 1R	BAR; 1R	BAR; QF	BAR; 1R	BAR; W	BAR; 1R	BAR; 3R	BAR; 1R	BAR; 2R	BAR; 1R	BAR; 1R	BAR; 1R
2023	BAR; 3R	BAR; 2R	BAR; 1R	BAR; 1R	BAR; 4R	BAR; 1R	HIL; 2R	HIL; 4R	WIG; 3R	WIG; 1R	LEI; 2R	LEI; 2R	HIL; 3R	HIL; 1R	LEI; 2R	LEI; 1R	HIL; 1R	HIL; 2R	BAR; 1R	BAR; 1R	BAR; 2R	BAR; 1R	BAR; 1R	BAR; 1R	BAR; 1R	BAR; 1R	BAR; 1R	BAR; 2R	BAR; 2R	BAR; 1R
2024	WIG; 1R	WIG; 1R	LEI; 1R	LEI; 1R	HIL; 2R	HIL; 2R	LEI; 1R	LEI; 1R	HIL; 1R	HIL; 2R	HIL; 1R	HIL; 1R	MIL; 2R	MIL; 1R	MIL; 1R	MIL; 1R	MIL; 1R	MIL; 2R	MIL; 1R	WIG; 2R	WIG; 2R	LEI; 1R	LEI; 2R	WIG; 1R	WIG; 1R	WIG; 1R	WIG; 1R	WIG; DNP	LEI; 1R	LEI; 2R

Performance Table Legend
W	Won the tournament	F	Finalist	SF	Semifinalist	QF	Quarterfinalist	#R; RR; Prel.	Lost in # round Round-robin; Preliminary round	DQ	Disqualified
DNQ	Did not qualify	DNP	Did not participate	WD	Withdrew	NH	Tournament not held	#R; RR; Prel.	Lost in # round Round-robin; Preliminary round	NYF	Not yet founded
