= Ciarán Kelly (footballer, born 1980) =

Irish footballer and coach

Personal information
- Date of birth: 14 March 1980 (age 46)
- Place of birth: Roundfort, County Mayo, Ireland
- Position: Goalkeeper

Youth career
- Ballinrobe Town
- Castlebar Celtic

Senior career*
Years	Team	Apps	(Gls)
2002–2003	Sligo Rovers	48	(0)
2004	Derry City	8	(0)
2005	Galway United	0	(0)
2006	Castlebar Celtic	?	
2007–2008	Athlone Town	43	(0)
2009–2013	Sligo Rovers	21	(0)

Managerial career
- 2015–2017: Castlebar Celtic
- 2017–: Lusail SC (head coach)
- * Club domestic league appearances and goals

Ciarán Kelly (born 14 March 1980), is an Irish former professional footballer and head coach for Lusail SC in Qatar who played as a goalkeeper. He last played football for Sligo Rovers in the League of Ireland Premier Division until 2013.

== Early life ==
He was born and went to primary school in Roundfort, a small parish near Ballinrobe, in south County Mayo.

== Career ==
Kelly started his career with Ballinrobe Town before first moving to Sligo Rovers. He then had spells with Derry City, Athlone Town and Galway United before re-joining Sligo Rovers in 2009.

On 14 November 2010 in the FAI Ford Cup final, Kelly saved four out of four penalties in a penalty shoot-out as Sligo beat Shamrock Rovers 2–0. On 6 November 2011 in the FAI Ford Cup final, Kelly saved two penalties in a penalty shoot-out as Sligo beat Shelbourne 4–1 after being sprung from the bench at the end of extra time.

== Honours ==
Sligo Rovers

- League of Ireland (1): 2012
- FAI Cup (3): 2010, 2011, 2013
- League of Ireland Cup (1): 2010
