= 2010 FAI Cup final =

- Event: 2010 FAI Cup
Sligo Rovers	Shamrock Rovers
0	0
- After extra time Sligo won 2–0 on penalties
- Date: 14 November 2010
- Venue: Aviva Stadium, Dublin
- Man of the Match: Joseph Ndo (Sligo Rovers)
- Referee: Tomás Connolly (Dublin)
- Attendance: 36,101

The 2010 FAI Cup final was the final match of the 2010 FAI Cup competition and was contested by Sligo Rovers and Shamrock Rovers at the Aviva Stadium in Dublin on 14 November 2010. Shamrock Rovers were looking to complete the double of League and cup after winning the 2010 League of Ireland. Sligo Rovers won the cup 2–0 on penalties.

The final was the first to be staged at the new Aviva Stadium. The match was shown live on RTÉ television and online worldwide.

== Ticketing ==
On 22 October 2010, the Football Association of Ireland announced that tickets for the final would go on sale to supporters at the discounted rates of €10 and €5 to mark the first FAI Ford Cup final at the Aviva Stadium.

== Match summary ==
Before the biggest attendance at a cup final since 1968, 36,101, both teams cancelled each other out over 120 minutes leaving the final to be decided by spot kicks for the second time in three years. Eoin Doyle converted the first Sligo penalty in the shoot-out but the next five penalties were all missed. Gary McCabe made it 2–0 with Sligo's fourth only for Paddy Kavanagh to have his attempt saved by Sligo keeper Ciaran Kelly. Kelly saved all four Shamrock Rovers spot-kicks in the penalty shoot-out. Shamrock Rovers had finished the game with ten men, through the dismissal of Stephen Bradley, who later claimed his team had battered their opponents, ten minutes from the finish of extra time for a second yellow card, while Sligo's Joseph Ndo was named man of the match.

== Match details ==
14 November 2010
15.30 IST

Sligo Rovers	0–0 (a.e.t.)	Shamrock Rovers
	Report
Penalties
Doyle (penalty scored); Keane (penalty missed); O'Grady (penalty missed); McCabe (penalty scored)	2–0	(penalty missed) Twigg; (penalty missed) Flynn; (penalty missed) Turner; (penalty missed) Kavanagh

Aviva Stadium, Dublin
Attendance: 36,101
Referee: Tomás Connolly (Dublin)

Sligo Rovers	Shamrock Rovers
