= 2013 PDC World Youth Championship =

Tournament information
- Dates: 22 March 2013; 16 May 2013 (final)
- Venue: The O2 Arena
- Location: London
- Country: England
- Organisation(s): PDC
- Format: Legs first to 6
- Prize fund: £40,000
- Winner's share: £10,000
- Nine-dart finish: (Wales) Kurt Parry (England) Michael Smith

Champion(s)
- (England) Michael Smith

The 2013 PDC World Youth Championship was the third edition of the PDC World Youth Championship, a tournament organised by the Professional Darts Corporation for darts players aged between 14 and 21.

The knock-out stages from the last 64 to the semi-finals were played in Barnsley on 22 March 2013. The final took place on 16 May 2013, before the final of the 2013 Premier League Darts, which was shown live on Sky Sports.

James Hubbard was the defending champion, but he was knocked out in the first round by Matthew Dicken. Michael Smith and Ricky Evans contested the final at The O2 Arena, London, with Smith winning 6–1.

== Prize money ==
Position (no. of players)		Prize money (Total: £40,000)
Winner	(1)	£10,000
Runner-up	(1)	£5,000
Semi-finalists	(2)	£3,000
Quarter-finalists	(4)	£1,500
Third round	(8)	£725
Second round	(16)	£250
First round	(32)	£100

== Qualification ==
The tournament featured 64 players. The top 52 players in the PDC Youth Tour Order of Merit automatically qualified for the tournament, with the top eight players being seeded. They were joined by 12 international qualifiers.

The participants were:

1-52

1. (England) Arron Monk
2. (England) Michael Smith
3. (England) James Hubbard
4. (Wales) Jamie Lewis
5. (England) Chris Aubrey
6. (England) Keegan Brown
7. (England) Josh Payne
8. (England) Sam Hill
9. (England) Shaun Griffiths
10. (England) Jake Patchett
11. (England) Sam Head
12. (England) Adam Hunt
13. (England) Jamie Landon
14. (England) Adam Smith-Neale
15. (England) Ricky Evans
16. (England) Reece Robinson
17. (England) Matthew Dennant
18. (England) Ben Songhurst
19. (England) Jake Jones
20. (England) Aden Kirk
21. (England) Sam Hamilton
22. (England) Steve Haggerty
23. (England) Oliver Stell
24. (Netherlands) Wouter Vaes
25. (Republic of Ireland) Paddy Meaney
26. (England) Brandonn Monk
27. (Republic of Ireland) Martin Heneghan
28. (England) Jack Hill
29. (England) George Killington
30. (England) Darren Whittingham
31. (Wales) Kurt Parry
32. (England) Lee Whitworth
33. (Netherlands) John de Kruijf
34. (Netherlands) Ryan de Vreede
35. (England) Matthew Dicken
36. (England) Brandon Walsh
37. (England) Curtis Hammond
38. (England) Lewis Venes
39. (Republic of Ireland) John Seagrave
40. (England) Joe Davis
41. (England) Curtis Bagley
42. (England) Sam Davidson
43. (Netherlands) Ricky de Vos
44. (England) Ryan Harrington
45. (England) Josh Jones
46. (England) James Thompson
47. (Wales) Michael Blake
48. (England) Josh McCarthy
49. (England) Shane Friedlander
50. (England) Harry Miles
51. (England) Liam Showell
52. (England) Adam Hart

International qualifiers

- (Republic of Ireland) Oisin Daly
- (Netherlands) Dirk van Duijvenbode
- (Republic of Ireland) Dean Finn
- (Spain) Sergio Garcia
- (Germany) Kai Gotthardt
- (Finland) Teemu Harju
- (Germany) Max Hopp
- (Australia) Harley Kemp
- (United States) Dan Lauby Jr
- (Canada) Shaun Narain
- (Austria) Rowby-John Rodriguez
- (Australia) Jackson Wilson-Young

Celtic qualifiers

- (Isle of Man) Callum Brew

== Draw ==
=== Preliminary round ===
- (England) Curtis Bagley 6 – 1 Callum Brew (Isle of Man)

=== Last 64 ===
First round (best of 11 legs); 22 March
1	(England) Arron Monk	6
(England) Curtis Bagley	2
(England) Curtis Hammond	4
(Spain) Sergio Garcia	6
(England) Lee Whitworth	0
(Netherlands) Dirk van Duijvenbode	6
(Wales) Michael Blake	6
(United States) Dan Lauby Jr	3
8	(England) Sam Hill	6
(England) Jake Jones	3
(Netherlands) Ryan de Vreede	6
(England) Jamie Landon	2
(Wales) Kurt Parry	6
(England) Joe Davis	1
(England) Matthew Dennant	4
(England) Josh Jones	6
5	(England) Chris Aubrey	6
(Finland) Teemu Harju	4
(Republic of Ireland) Paddy Meaney	6
(Germany) Kai Gotthardt	1
(England) Shaun Griffiths	3
(Australia) Harley Kemp	6
(Canada) Shaun Narain	2
(England) Ricky Evans	6
4	(Wales) Jamie Lewis	5
(England) Brandonn Monk	6
(Republic of Ireland) Oisin Daly	4
(England) Sam Hamilton	6
(England) Adam Smith-Neale	5
(England) Ben Songhurst	6
(Germany) Max Hopp	6
(England) Aden Kirk	4
2	(England) Michael Smith	6
(England) Brandon Walsh	0
(Republic of Ireland) John Seagrave	4
(England) George Killington	6
(England) Sam Head	6
(England) James Thompson	1
(England) Darren Whittingham	6
(England) Liam Showell	1
7	(England) Josh Payne	6
(Republic of Ireland) Martin Heneghan	3
(England) Jack Hill	3
(Republic of Ireland) Dean Finn	6
(England) Sam Davidson	5
(England) Steve Haggerty	6
(England) Harry Miles	5
(England) Lewis Venes	6
6	(England) Keegan Brown	1
(England) Reece Robinson	6
(England) Ryan Harrington	1
(Austria) Rowby-John Rodriguez	6
(Netherlands) Ricky de Vos	3
(Australia) Jackson Wilson-Young	6
(England) Jake Patchett	6
(Netherlands) John de Kruijf	3
3	(England) James Hubbard	4
(England) Matthew Dicken	6
(England) Adam Hart	0
(Netherlands) Wouter Vaes	6
(England) Oliver Stell	4
(England) Adam Hunt	6
(England) Josh McCarthy	6
(England) Shane Friedlander	3

Second round (best of 11 legs); 22 March
1	(England) Arron Monk	6
(Spain) Sergio Garcia	2
(Netherlands) Dirk van Duijvenbode	6
(Wales) Michael Blake	5
8	(England) Sam Hill	4
(Netherlands) Ryan de Vreede	6
(Wales) Kurt Parry	6
(England) Josh Jones	5
5	(England) Chris Aubrey	6
(Republic of Ireland) Paddy Meaney	5
(Australia) Harley Kemp	4
(England) Ricky Evans	6
(England) Brandonn Monk	4
(England) Sam Hamilton	6
(England) Ben Songhurst	4
(Germany) Max Hopp	6
2	(England) Michael Smith	6
(England) George Killington	0
(England) Sam Head	6
(England) Darren Whittingham	3
7	(England) Josh Payne	5
(Republic of Ireland) Dean Finn	6
(England) Steve Haggerty	6
(England) Lewis Venes	5
(England) Reece Robinson	6
(Austria) Rowby-John Rodriguez	4
(Australia) Jackson Wilson-Young	2
(England) Jake Patchett	6
(England) Matthew Dicken	6
(Netherlands) Wouter Vaes	4
(England) Adam Hunt	6
(England) Josh McCarthy	1

Third round (best of 11 legs); 22 March
1	(England) Arron Monk	6
(Netherlands) Dirk van Duijvenbode	2
(Netherlands) Ryan de Vreede	6
(Wales) Kurt Parry	0
5	(England) Chris Aubrey	2
(England) Ricky Evans	6
(England) Sam Hamilton	6
(Germany) Max Hopp	3
2	(England) Michael Smith	6
(England) Sam Head	1
(Republic of Ireland) Dean Finn	6
(England) Steve Haggerty	5
(England) Reece Robinson	3
(England) Jake Patchett	6
(England) Matthew Dicken	4
(England) Adam Hunt	6

Quarter-finals (best of 11 legs); 22 March
1	(England) Arron Monk	6
(Netherlands) Ryan de Vreede	3
(England) Ricky Evans	6
(England) Sam Hamilton	5
2	(England) Michael Smith	6
(Republic of Ireland) Dean Finn	0
(England) Jake Patchett	3
(England) Adam Hunt	6

Semi-finals (best of 11 legs); 22 March
1	(England) Arron Monk	3
(England) Ricky Evans	6
2	(England) Michael Smith	6
(England) Adam Hunt	3

Final (best of 11 legs); 16 May
(England) Ricky Evans	1
2	(England) Michael Smith	6
