= 2018 World Masters (darts) =

Tournament on the BDO/WDF calendar for 2018

Winmau World Masters

Tournament information
- Dates: 3–7 October
- Venue: Bridlington Spa Hall
- Location: Bridlington
- Country: England
- Organisation(s): BDO
- Format: Sets for men, Legs for women, boys and girls
- Prize fund: £70,500
- Winner's share: £25,000 (men), £5,000 (women)

Champion(s)
- (England) Adam Smith-Neale (men) (England) Lisa Ashton (women) (Netherlands) Jurjen van der Velde (boys) (England) Beau Greaves (girls)

The 2018 Winmau World Masters was a major tournament on the BDO/WDF calendar for 2018. It took place from 3–7 October at the Bridlington Spa Hall, which hosted the stage element of the event for the second time since 2009.

The event was the first time a BDO Major tournament had not been broadcast on television in 28 years after Eurosport decided to not renew the rights to the event. The event was streamed live on YouTube through the channel winmau TV

Krzysztof Ratajski was the reigning men's champion after defeating Mark McGeeney in last year's final by 6 sets to 1, but switched to the PDC straight after last years event meaning he was excluded from taking part. Lorraine Winstanley was the defending women's champion after defeating Corrine Hammond in the final by 5 legs to 2, but she lost 4–0 in the quarter-finals to Casey Gallagher.

Adam Smith-Neale became the 2nd player in 2 years to win the event after starting at the first round (Seeds are given byes to the last 32) after Ratajski managed the same feat last year. He won his first major title by defeating two-time champion Glen Durrant 6–4 in the final.

Lisa Ashton won the Women's World Masters for the second time with a 5–2 win over Casey Gallagher in the final.

== Men's seeds ==
The seedings were finalised on 10 September. For the third consecutive year, there were 16 seeds (a decrease from 32 between 2012 and 2015) with all seeds exempt until the Last 32 stage and cannot play each other until the Last 16 stage.

1. (England) Glen Durrant (runner-up)
2. (England) Mark McGeeney (last 16)
3. (Wales) Jim Williams (semi-finals)
4. (Netherlands) Wesley Harms (last 32)
5. (England) Scott Mitchell (semi-finals)
6. (England) Scott Waites (quarter-finals)
7. (Germany) Michael Unterbuchner (last 16)
8. (England) Gary Robson (quarter-finals)
9. (Scotland) Ross Montgomery (last 32)
10. (Wales) Wayne Warren (quarter-finals)
11. (England) Dave Parletti (last 16)
12. (Netherlands) Willem Mandigers (last 16)
13. (Netherlands) Chris Landman (last 32)
14. (Netherlands) Richard Veenstra (last 16)
15. (England) Daniel Day (last 32)
16. (England) Scott Baker (last 32)

== Men's draw (last 48 onwards) ==
Last 48; 4 October (best of 5 sets)
(England) John Walton	3
(England) Martin Adams	0
(Scotland) Gary Stone	3
(Wales) Martin Phillips	1
(Netherlands) Wouter Vaes	3
(England) Darren Tyler	0
(Belgium) Mario Vandenbogaerde	3
(Northern Ireland) Darren Clifford	0
(Republic of Ireland) Shane McGuirk	3
(England) Gary Stafford	2
(Finland) Paavo Myller	0
(Germany) Ricardo Pietreczko	3
(England) Wes Newton	2
(England) Eddie Mordica	3
(Republic of Ireland) Michael Meaney	2
(England) David Copley	3
(Republic of Ireland) Keith Geraghty	3
(Spain) Ricardo Fernández	1
(England) Adam Smith-Neale	3
(England) Aaron Turner	1
(England) John Burgess	3
(England) Michael Haynes	1
(England) Terry Stubbs	3
(Wales) Mikey Rees	1
(Belgium) Roger Janssen	3
(Sweden) Oskar Lukasiak	1
(Netherlands) Martijn Kleermaker	1
(Poland) Krzysztof Kciuk	3
(England) Dennis Harbour	0
(England) Nigel Heydon	3
(Poland) Sebastian Steyer	3
(England) Jason Lovett	1

Last 32; 5 October (best of 5 sets)
1	(England) Glen Durrant 99.62	3
(England) John Walton 89.76	1
16	(England) Scott Baker 83.16	1
(Scotland) Gary Stone 86.64	3
8	(England) Gary Robson 80.64	3
(Netherlands) Wouter Vaes 75.66	1
9	(Scotland) Ross Montgomery 82.41	1
(Belgium) Mario Vandenbogaerde 90.85	3
5	(England) Scott Mitchell 83.73	3
(Republic of Ireland) Shane McGuirk 80.98	1
12	(Netherlands) Willem Mandigers 86.50	3
(Germany) Ricardo Pietreczko 80.68	1
4	(Netherlands) Wesley Harms 81.96	2
(England) Eddie Mordica 75.99	3
13	(Netherlands) Chris Landman 84.55	1
(England) David Copley 82.80	3
2	(England) Mark McGeeney 93.02	3
(Republic of Ireland) Keith Geraghty 85.93	1
15	(England) Daniel Day 78.55	0
(England) Adam Smith-Neale 92.97	3
7	(Germany) Michael Unterbuchner 97.20	3
(England) John Burgess 102.72	1
10	(Wales) Wayne Warren 91.08	3
(England) Terry Stubbs 83.22	0
6	(England) Scott Waites 104.50	3
(Belgium) Roger Janssen 96.52	0
11	(England) Dave Parletti 87.02	3
(Poland) Krzysztof Kciuk 82.70	1
3	(Wales) Jim Williams 87.07	3
(England) Nigel Heydon 86.85	2
14	(Netherlands) Richard Veenstra 80.87	3
(Poland) Sebastian Steyer 75.16	0

Last 16; 6 October (best of 5 sets)
1	(England) Durrant 97.18	3
(Scotland) Stone 88.97	0
8	(England) Robson 92.19	3
(Belgium) Vandenbogaerde 95.25	1
5	(England) Mitchell 84.56	3
12	(Netherlands) Mandigers 85.67	2
(England) Mordica 74.57	1
(England) Copley 82.01	3
2	(England) McGeeney 88.82	2
(England) Smith-Neale 90.92	3
7	(Germany) Unterbuchner 101.44	0
10	(Wales) Warren 97.60	3
6	(England) Waites 92.28	3
11	(England) Parletti 96.34	1
3	(Wales) Williams 86.85	3
14	(Netherlands) Veenstra 90.76	1

Quarter-finals; 7 October (best of 7 sets)
1	(England) Durrant 101.99	4
8	(England) Robson 94.04	2
5	(England) Mitchell 108.72	4
(England) Copley 101.19	0
(England) Smith-Neale 96.82	4
10	(Wales) Warren 88.21	1
6	(England) Waites 100.22	3
3	(Wales) Williams 97.61	4

Semi-finals; 7 October (best of 9 sets)
1	(England) Durrant 98.70	5
5	(England) Mitchell 99.14	2
(England) Smith-Neale 93.92	5
3	(Wales) Williams 90.91	3

Final; 7 October (best of 11 sets)
1	(England) Durrant 99.68	4
(England) Smith-Neale 96.86	6

== Women's seeds ==
It was announced before the start of the event that the Ladies seeds were cut from 8 to 4 for unknown reasons.

1. (England) Lorraine Winstanley (quarter-finals)
2. (England) Lisa Ashton (champion)
3. (England) Deta Hedman (semi-finals)
4. (Russia) Anastasia Dobromyslova (semi-finals)

== Women's draw (last 8 onwards) ==
Quarter-finals (best of 7 legs); 6 October
1	(England) Lorraine Winstanley 69.23	0
(England) Casey Gallagher 77.08	4
4	(Russia) Anastasia Dobromyslova 73.38	4
(England) Sue Gulliver 70.77	1
2	(England) Lisa Ashton 92.04	4
(Australia) Corrine Hammond 78.42	1
3	(England) Deta Hedman 84.02	4
(Japan) Mikuru Suzuki 80.38	3

Semi-finals (best of 7 legs); 7 October
(England) Casey Gallagher 73.73	4
4	(Russia) Anastasia Dobromyslova 74.78	3
2	(England) Lisa Ashton 75.54	4
3	(England) Deta Hedman 75.70	2

Final (best of 9 legs); 7 October
(England) Casey Gallagher 77.46	2
2	(England) Lisa Ashton 84.17	5
