= Wouter Vaes =

Dutch darts player

Personal information
- Born: 9 February 1991 (age 35) Netherlands
- Home town: Ospel, Netherlands

Sport
- Sport: Darts
- Playing since: 2007
- Laterality: Right-handed
- Walk-on music: "Wake Up" by Brennan Heart

Organisation (see split in darts)
- BDO: 2009-2010, 2011-2012, 2015-
- PDC: 2010-2011. 2012-2015

WDF major events – best performances
- World Championship: Last 32: 2017
- World Masters: Last 32: 2018
- World Trophy: Last 32: 2017
- Finder Masters: Last 24 Group: 2016, 2017, 2018

Other tournament wins
- Tournament: Years
- Antwerp Open: 2018

Wouter Vaes (born 9 February 1991) is a Dutch professional darts player who plays in British Darts Organisation (BDO) tournaments.

== Career ==
Vaes' professional career started in the 2009 Sunparks Masters, where he finished among the Last 64. Since then he has competed in numerous tournaments and competitions, and have made it to several quarter finals and semi finals. He has made it to a single final round, in the 2016 Austria Open Vienna tournament, in which he lost against Robert Allenstein.

Despite never winning a tournament in his career, Vaes qualified for the 2017 BDO World Darts Championship, where he lost 0–3 to Darryl Fitton.

His first tournament win was the 2018 edition of the Antwerp Open where he beat Mario Vandenbogaerde 7–5 in the final.

== World Championship results ==
=== BDO ===
- 2017: 1st Round (lost to Darryl Fitton 0–3)
- 2019: Preliminary Round (lost to Roger Janssen 0–3)
