= Kevin Voornhout =

Dutch darts player

Personal information
- Born: 20 November 1995 (age 30) Groningen, Netherlands
- Home town: Groningen, Netherlands

Sport
- Sport: Darts
- Playing since: 2012
- Darts: 24g Adrian Lewis
- Laterality: Right-handed
- Walk-on music: "Why Can't This Be Love" by Van Halen

Organisation (see split in darts)
- PDC: 2014–2016

Other tournament wins
- Tournament: Years
- WDF Europe Youth Cup Boys WDF Europe Youth Cup Team: 2012 2012

Kevin Voornhout (born 20 November 1995) is a Dutch former professional darts player who played in Professional Darts Corporation (PDC) events.

He won the WDF Europe Youth Cup in both the Boys and Team event in 2012 and won a PDC Tour Card in 2014.
