= 2011 PDC Under-21 World Championship =

Tournament information
- Dates: 16 November 2010; 3 January 2011 (final)
- Venue: Alexandra Palace
- Location: London
- Country: England
- Organisation(s): PDC
- Format: Legs, first to 4, first to 6 (final)
- Prize fund: £30,000
- Winner's share: £10,000

Champion(s)
- (England) Arron Monk

The 2011 PDC Under-21 World Championship was the first edition of the PDC World Youth Championship, a tournament organised by the Professional Darts Corporation for darts players aged between 14 and 21.

The knockout stages from the last 64 to the semi-finals were played in Barnsley on 16 November 2010, and were not broadcast live on TV. The final took place on 3 January 2011, before the final of the 2011 PDC World Darts Championship, which was shown live on Sky Sports. The two finalists became PDC Pro Tour card holders for 2011 and 2012 and received sponsorship from Rileys Dart Zones. They also received invitations to the 2010 Grand Slam of Darts.

Arron Monk defeated Michael van Gerwen 6–4 in the final to win the inaugural PDC World Youth Championship.

== Prize money ==
Position (no. of players)		Prize money (Total: £30,000)
Winner	(1)	£10,000
Runner-up	(1)	£5,000
Semi-finalists	(2)	£2,500
Quarter-finalists	(4)	£1,250
Third round	(8)	£625
Second round	(16)	£0
First round	(32)	£0

== Qualification ==
Qualification was achieved at 50 Rileys Dart Zone tournaments throughout the UK and also various national tournaments throughout the world. The leading eight eligible PDPA members in the PDC Order of Merit on 20 September were seeded into the last 64.

The participants are:

=== Seeds ===
1. (Netherlands) Michael van Gerwen
2. (England) Joe Cullen
3. (England) Arron Monk
4. (England) Michael Smith
5. (England) Tom Martin
6. (England) Ryan Harrington
7. (England) Tony Clark
8. (England) Sean White

=== International qualifiers ===
- (Canada) Bryce Book
- (Australia) Mitchell Clegg
- (Republic of Ireland) David Coyne
- (Netherlands) Rico Dera
- (Netherlands) Dirk van Duijvenbode
- (Finland) Teemu Harju
- (Republic of Ireland) Martin Heneghan
- (Netherlands) Benito van de Pas
- (Philippines) Alexis Toylo

=== Rileys qualifiers ===
- (England) Chris Aubrey
- (England) Curtis Bagley
- (England) Leon Bailey
- (England) Aaron Bateman
- (England) Keegan Brown
- (England) Michael Bushby
- (England) Kirk Deruyter
- (England) Dan Dean
- (England) Liam Deveries
- (England) Matthew Dicken
- (England) Sean East
- (England) Shaun Griffiths
- (England) Sam Hamilton
- (England) Curtis Hammond
- (England) David Harnick
- (England) Alex Harrison
- (England) Jack Hill
- (England) Ryan Hitchens
- (England) Kevin Hodgin
- (Scotland) Ryan Hogarth
- (England) Thomas Humphrey
- (England) Adam Hunt
- (England) Luke Johnson
- (England) Scott Johnson
- (Scotland) Stuart Keith
- (Wales) Nick Kenny
- (England) Ash Khayat
- (England) Jamie Landon
- (England) Dean Lockyer
- (England) Jack Marriner
- (England) Ryan McCarthy
- (Wales) Daniel McGivney
- (Scotland) Jamie McNair
- (England) Harry Miles
- (England) Callum Nesbit
- (Scotland) Graeme Orr
- (England) Daniel Ovens
- (England) David Pallett
- (England) Josh Payne
- (England) Jamie Phillips
- (England) Dale Quince
- (England) Liam Showell
- (England) Damien Smith
- (England) John Smith
- (England) Adam Smith-Neale
- (England) Lewis Venes
- (England) Brandon Walsh
- (England) David Williams
- (England) Michael Wood
- (England) Matthew Wright

== Draw ==
=== Preliminary round ===
(England) Shaun Griffiths 4–1 (England) Josh Payne

(England) Dan Dean 4–3 (England) Jack Marriner

(Australia) Mitchell Clegg 4–3 (Philippines) Alexis Toylo

=== Last 64 ===
First round (best of 7 legs); 16 November 2010
1	(Netherlands) Michael van Gerwen	4
(England) Keegan Brown	2
(England) Damien Smith	2
(England) Adam Hunt	4
(Netherlands) Dirk van Duijvenbode	4
(England) Liam Showell	0
(England) Michael Bushby	4
(Republic of Ireland) David Coyne	0
8	(England) Sean White	0
(Scotland) Graeme Orr	4
(England) Thomas Humphrey	3
(Republic of Ireland) Martin Heneghan	4
(Scotland) Jamie McNair	1
(England) Matthew Dicken	4
(England) Alex Harrison	1
(England) Shaun Griffiths	4
5	(England) Tom Martin	4
(Finland) Teemu Harju	0
(England) Curtis Hammond	4
(England) Brandon Walsh	3
(England) Sam Hamilton	2
(England) Ash Khayat	4
(Netherlands) Rico Dera	1
(Netherlands) Benito van de Pas	4
4	(England) Michael Smith	4
(England) Scott Johnson	0
(England) Sean East	4
(England) Matthew Wright	1
(England) Aaron Bateman	3
(England) Dale Quince	4
(England) Ryan Hitchens	4
(Australia) Mitchell Clegg	2
2	(England) Joe Cullen	4
(Scotland) Stuart Keith	0
(England) David Harnick	4
(England) Harry Miles	2
(England) Liam Deveries	4
(England) Kevin Hodgin	2
(England) Adam Smith-Neale	3
(England) Lewis Venes	4
7	(England) Tony Clark	1
(England) David Pallett	4
(England) Kirk Deruyter	3
(England) John Smith	4
(England) Dean Lockyer	0
(England) Chris Aubrey	4
(England) Luke Johnson	2
(England) Dan Dean	4
6	(England) Ryan Herrington	0
(Wales) Daniel McGivney	4
(England) Callum Nesbit	4
(England) Ryan McCarthy	1
(England) Jamie Landon	4
(England) Michael Wood	0
(England) David Williams	0
(Canada) Bryce Book	4
3	(England) Arron Monk	4
(Wales) Nick Kenny	2
(England) Leon Bailey	4
(England) Daniel Ovens	2
(England) Jack Hill	4
(England) Jamie Phillips	3
(England) Curtis Bagley	4
(Scotland) Ryan Hogarth	2

Second round (best of 7 legs); 16 November 2010
1	(Netherlands) Michael van Gerwen	4
(England) Adam Hunt	3
(Netherlands) Dirk van Duijvenbode	3
(England) Michael Bushby	4
(Scotland) Graeme Orr	2
(Republic of Ireland) Martin Heneghan	4
(England) Matthew Dicken	3
(England) Shaun Griffiths	4
5	(England) Tom Martin	1
(England) Curtis Hammond	4
(England) Ash Khayat	0
(Netherlands) Benito van de Pas	4
4	(England) Michael Smith	4
(England) Sean East	1
(England) Dale Quince	2
(England) Ryan Hitchens	4
2	(England) Joe Cullen	4
(England) David Harnick	1
(England) Liam Deveries	3
(England) Lewis Venes	4
(England) David Pallett	2
(England) John Smith	4
(England) Chris Aubrey	4
(England) Dan Dean	0
(Wales) Daniel McGivney	4
(England) Callum Nesbit	0
(England) Jamie Landon	3
(Canada) Bryce Book	4
3	(England) Arron Monk	4
(England) Leon Bailey	2
(England) Jack Hill	1
(England) Curtis Bagley	4

Third round (best of 7 legs); 16 November 2010
1	(Netherlands) Michael van Gerwen	4
(England) Michael Bushby	0
(Republic of Ireland) Martin Heneghan	3
(England) Shaun Griffiths	4
(England) Curtis Hammond	3
(Netherlands) Benito van de Pas	4
4	(England) Michael Smith	4
(England) Ryan Hitchens	1
2	(England) Joe Cullen	3
(England) Lewis Venes	4
(England) John Smith	2
(England) Chris Aubrey	4
(Wales) Daniel McGivney	4
(Canada) Bryce Book	0
3	(England) Arron Monk	4
(England) Curtis Bagley	1

Quarter-finals (best of 7 legs); 16 November 2010
1	(Netherlands) Michael van Gerwen	4
(England) Shaun Griffiths	3
(Netherlands) Benito van de Pas	4
4	(England) Michael Smith	2
(England) Lewis Venes	4
(England) Chris Aubrey	3
(Wales) Daniel McGivney	0
3	(England) Arron Monk	4

Semi-finals (best of 7 legs); 16 November 2010
1	(Netherlands) Michael van Gerwen	4
(Netherlands) Benito van de Pas	1
(England) Lewis Venes	2
3	(England) Arron Monk	4

Final (best of 11 legs); 3 January 2011
1	(Netherlands) Michael van Gerwen 87.06	4
3	(England) Arron Monk 93.03	6
