= 2018 PDC Pro Tour =

Darts tournaments

The 2018 PDC Pro Tour was a series of non-televised darts tournaments organised by the Professional Darts Corporation (PDC). Players Championships, UK Open Qualifiers and European Tour events are the events that make up the Pro Tour. In this year there are 41 PDC Pro Tour events being held – 22 Players Championships, six UK Open Qualifiers and 13 European Tour events.

This page also includes results from the PDC’s affiliated tours including the Development and Challenge Tours and all the regional tours as well as the results from the World Championship regional qualifiers.

== Prize money ==
The prize money for the UK Open Qualifiers and Players Championship and European Tour events stayed the same as 2017.

This is how the prize money is divided:

Stage	ET	PC	UKQ	CT/DT
Winner	£25,000	£10,000	£10,000	£2,000
Runner-up	£10,000	£6,000	£5,000	£1,000
Semi-finalists	£6,000	£3,000	£2,500	£500
Quarter-finalists	£4,000	£2,250	£2,000	£300
Last 16	£3,000	£1,500	£1,500	£200
Last 32	£2,000	£1,000	£750	£100
Last 48	£1,000	N/A	N/A	N/A
Last 64	N/A	£500	£250	£50
Total	£135,000	£75,000	£60,000	£10,000

== PDC Tour Card ==
128 players are granted Tour Cards, which enables them to participate in all Players Championships, UK Open Qualifiers and European Tour events.

=== Tour cards ===
The 2018 Tour Cards are awarded to:

- (64) The top 64 players from the PDC Order of Merit after the 2018 World Championship.
  - Phil Taylor resigned his card, and therefore, Martin Schindler moved into the top 64.
- (24) 24 qualifiers from 2017 Q-School not ranked in the top 64 of the PDC Order of Merit following the World Championship.
- (2) Two highest qualifiers from 2016 Challenge Tour (Rob Cross (Note: Rob Cross is in the top 64 of the Order of Merit, and therefore, one extra Tour Card was awarded to a Q-School qualifier.) and Ryan Searle).
- (2) Two highest qualifiers from 2016 Development Tour (Ross Twell and Aden Kirk).
- (2) Two highest qualifiers from 2017 Challenge Tour (Wayne Jones and Mark Dudbridge).
- (2) Two highest qualifiers from 2017 Development Tour (Luke Humphries and Adam Hunt). (Note: Dimitri Van den Bergh is also in the top 64 of the PDC Order of Merit, and therefore, a Pro Tour Card was awarded to Adam Hunt, who finished third on the Development Tour Order of Merit.)
- (12) The 12 qualifiers from the 2018 Qualifying Schools.

Afterwards, the playing field will be complemented by the highest qualified players from the Q School Order of Merit until the maximum number of 128 Pro Tour Card players had been reached. In 2018, that means that a total of 21 players will qualify this way.

=== Q-School ===
In a change to previous years, The PDC Pro Tour Qualifying School (or Q-School) was split into a UK and European Q-School. Players that are not from Europe can choose which Q-School they want to compete in.

- The UK Q-School took place at the Robin Park Arena in Wigan from 18–21 January.
- The European Q-School took place at the Halle 39 in Hildesheim from 18–21 January.

The following players won two-year tour cards on each of the days played:

18 January	19 January	20 January	21 January
UK Q-School
Eddie Dootson; Corey Cadby	Alan Tabern; Robert Owen	Arron Monk; George Killington	Bradley Brooks; Dawson Murschell
435 contestants	436 contestants	430 contestants	407 contestants
European Q-School
Jeffrey de Zwaan	Mario Robbe	Tytus Kanik	Gabriel Clemens
172 contestants	174 contestants	175 contestants	156 contestants
Total
607 contestants	610 contestants	605 contestants	563 contestants

An Order of Merit was also created for each Q School. For every win after the first full round (without byes) the players get awarded 1 point.

To complete the field of 128 Tour Card Holders, places were allocated down the final Qualifying School Order of Merits in proportion to the number of entrants. The following players picked up Tour Cards as a result:

UK Q-School Order of Merit

1. Nathan Aspinall
2. Ross Smith
3. Terry Temple
4. Ryan Harrington
5. Simon Stevenson
6. Gary Eastwood
7. John Goldie
8. Matthew Edgar
9. Ryan Meikle
10. Ryan Joyce
11. Kevin Burness
12. Tony Newell
13. Luke Woodhouse
14. Peter Hudson
15. Mark Wilson

European Q-School Order of Merit

1. Danny Noppert
2. Robert Marijanović
3. Dirk van Duijvenbode
4. Vincent Kamphuis
5. José Justicia
6. Davy Van Baelen

== UK Open Qualifiers ==
This would turn out to be the last year in which qualifiers for the UK Open would take place, as from the 2019 UK Open, all Tour Card holders would automatically qualify for the tournament.

No.	Date	Venue	Winner	Score	Runner-up	Ref.
1	Friday 2 February	(England) Wigan, Robin Park Arena	Michael van Gerwen (105.50)	6 – 3	Michael Smith (107.69)	
2	Saturday 3 February	(England) Wigan, Robin Park Arena	Michael van Gerwen (98.33)	6 – 3	Darren Webster (101.29)	
3	Sunday 4 February	(England) Wigan, Robin Park Arena	Michael Smith (96.97)	6 – 0	Zoran Lerchbacher (84.38)	
4	Friday 9 February	(England) Wigan, Robin Park Arena	Gary Anderson (100.05)	6 – 2	Jeffrey de Zwaan (94.42)	
5	Saturday 10 February	(England) Wigan, Robin Park Arena	Corey Cadby (108.77)	6 – 4	Rob Cross (102.67)	
6	Sunday 11 February	(England) Wigan, Robin Park Arena	Krzysztof Ratajski (101.93)	6 – 4	Daryl Gurney (95.94)	

== Players Championships ==
As with 2017, there were 22 Players Championship events.

No.	Date	Venue	Winner	Legs	Runner-up	Ref.
1	Saturday 17 February	(England) Barnsley, Barnsley Metrodome	Michael van Gerwen (103.82)	6 – 4	James Wade (94.25)	
2	Sunday 18 February	(England) Barnsley, Barnsley Metrodome	Michael van Gerwen (101.68)	6 – 1	Corey Cadby (94.45)	
3	Saturday 10 March	(England) Barnsley, Barnsley Metrodome	Gary Anderson (101.33)	6 – 0	Peter Wright (99.64)	
4	Sunday 11 March	(England) Barnsley, Barnsley Metrodome	Gary Anderson (91.42)	6 – 2	Jeffrey de Zwaan (80.70)	
5	Saturday 17 March	(England) Milton Keynes, Arena MK	Michael van Gerwen (99.58)	6 – 2	Chris Dobey (109.62)	
6	Sunday 18 March	(England) Milton Keynes, Arena MK	Ian White (97.57)	6 – 5	Dave Chisnall (97.38)	
7	Saturday 7 April	(England) Barnsley, Barnsley Metrodome	Michael Smith (98.03)	6 – 2	Adrian Lewis (101.07)	
8	Sunday 8 April	(England) Barnsley, Barnsley Metrodome	Mickey Mansell (97.93)	6 – 4	Adrian Lewis (90.37)	
9	Saturday 28 April	(England) Wigan, Robin Park Tennis Centre	Michael van Gerwen (100.86)	6 – 4	Scott Taylor (92.70)	
10	Sunday 29 April	(England) Wigan, Robin Park Tennis Centre	Jeffrey de Zwaan (92.91)	6 – 5	Jonny Clayton (96.11)	
11	Saturday 19 May	(England) Milton Keynes, Arena MK	Gary Anderson (100.65)	6 – 5	Gabriel Clemens (98.47)	
12	Sunday 20 May	(England) Milton Keynes, Arena MK	Josh Payne (99.62)	6 – 5	Peter Wright (101.62)	
13	Saturday 16 June	(England) Wigan, Robin Park Tennis Centre	Rob Cross (100.32)	6 – 4	Ian White (90.85)	
14	Sunday 17 June	(England) Wigan, Robin Park Tennis Centre	Peter Wright (96.57)	6 – 4	Rob Cross (95.63)	
15	Tuesday 26 June	(England) Barnsley, Barnsley Metrodome	Mervyn King (105.24)	6 – 2	James Wade (88.67)	
16	Wednesday 27 June	(England) Barnsley, Barnsley Metrodome	Ian White (91.54)	6 – 3	Darren Webster (88.49)	
17	Tuesday 4 September	(England) Barnsley, Barnsley Metrodome	Peter Wright (97.17)	6 – 2	Daryl Gurney (92.34)	
18	Wednesday 5 September	(England) Barnsley, Barnsley Metrodome	Nathan Aspinall (94.68)	6 – 4	Ryan Searle (94.41)	
19	Friday 28 September	(Republic of Ireland) Dublin, Citywest Hotel	Max Hopp (95.21)	6 – 3	Madars Razma (87.73)	
20	Saturday 29 September	(Republic of Ireland) Dublin, Citywest Hotel	Danny Noppert (98.68)	6 – 4	Ian White (98.56)	
21	Saturday 20 October	(England) Barnsley, Barnsley Metrodome	Krzysztof Ratajski (99.78)	6 – 2	Chris Dobey (94.65)	
22	Sunday 21 October	(England) Barnsley, Barnsley Metrodome	Krzysztof Ratajski (96.51)	6 – 4	Adrian Lewis (91.70)	

== European Tour ==
No.	Date	Event	Location	Winner	Legs	Runner-up	Ref.
1	23–25 March	European Darts Open	(Germany) Leverkusen, Ostermann-Arena	Michael van Gerwen (102.04)	8 – 7	Peter Wright (98.55)	
2	31 March–2 April	German Darts Grand Prix	(Germany) Munich, Kulturhalle Zenith	Michael van Gerwen (99.24)	8 – 5	Peter Wright (94.97)	
3	13–15 April	German Darts Open	(Germany) Saarbrücken, Saarlandhalle	Max Hopp (94.62)	8 – 7	Michael Smith (95.17)	
4	20–22 April	Austrian Darts Open	(Austria) Premstätten, Steiermarkhalle	Jonny Clayton (96.80)	8 – 5	Gerwyn Price (94.84)	
5	4–6 May	European Darts Grand Prix	(Germany) Sindelfingen, Glaspalast	Michael van Gerwen (110.87)	8 – 3	James Wade (98.38)	
6	11–13 May	Dutch Darts Masters	(Netherlands) Zwolle, IJsselhallen	Michael van Gerwen (97.53)	8 – 5	Steve Lennon (91.40)	
7	8–10 June	Gibraltar Darts Trophy	Gibraltar, Victoria Stadium	Michael van Gerwen (108.13)	8 – 3	Adrian Lewis (96.69)	
8	22–24 June	Danish Darts Open	(Denmark) Copenhagen, Brøndbyhallen	Mensur Suljović (99.31)	8 – 3	Simon Whitlock (94.78)	
9	29 June–1 July	European Darts Matchplay	(Germany) Hamburg, Edel-optics.de Arena	Michael van Gerwen (105.17)	8 – 2	William O'Connor (93.92)	
10	31 August–2 September	German Darts Championship	(Germany) Hildesheim, Halle 39	Michael van Gerwen (101.24)	8 – 6	James Wilson (93.30)	
11	7–9 September	Dutch Darts Championship	(Netherlands) Maastricht, MECC Maastricht	Ian White (89.18)	8 – 5	Ricky Evans (89.23)	
12	14–16 September	International Darts Open	(Germany) Riesa, SACHSENarena	Gerwyn Price (98.26)	8 – 3	Simon Whitlock (88.50)	
13	12–14 October	European Darts Trophy	(Germany) Göttingen, Lokhalle	Michael van Gerwen (111.27)	8 – 3	James Wade (79.09)	

== PDC Challenge Tour ==
As with the previous year, the 2018 PDC Challenge Tour series consisted of 20 events, held over 5 weekends.

No.	Date	Venue	Winner	Legs	Runner-up	Ref.
1	Saturday 27 January	(England) Wigan, Robin Park Tennis Centre	Simon Preston	5 – 2	Jarred Cole	
2	Saturday 27 January	(England) Wigan, Robin Park Tennis Centre	Diogo Portela	5 – 3	Michael Barnard	
3	Sunday 28 January	(England) Wigan, Robin Park Tennis Centre	Martin Atkins	5 – 4	Michael Barnard	
4	Sunday 28 January	(England) Wigan, Robin Park Tennis Centre	Jason Cullen	5 – 4	Cameron Menzies	
5	Saturday 24 March	(England) Milton Keynes, Arena MK	John Davey (83.50)	5 – 0	Adrian Gray (70.03)	
6	Saturday 24 March	(England) Milton Keynes, Arena MK	Michael Barnard (104.56)	5 – 2	Jason Lowe (99.99)	
7	Sunday 25 March	(England) Milton Keynes, Arena MK	Dennis Nilsson (78.64)	5 – 2	Harry Ward (83.88)	
8	Sunday 25 March	(England) Milton Keynes, Arena MK	Ted Evetts (89.57)	5 – 1	Krzysztof Ratajski (86.85)	
9	Saturday 5 May	(England) Wigan, Robin Park Tennis Centre	Cody Harris (83.88)	5 – 2	Yordi Meeuwisse (77.08)	
10	Saturday 5 May	(England) Wigan, Robin Park Tennis Centre	Michael Barnard (93.31)	5 – 1	Martin Atkins (80.19)	
11	Sunday 6 May	(England) Wigan, Robin Park Tennis Centre	Michael Barnard (99.98)	5 – 3	Andy Jenkins (92.14)	
12	Sunday 6 May	(England) Wigan, Robin Park Tennis Centre	Adam Huckvale (89.00)	5 – 3	Darren Beveridge (77.77)	
13	Saturday 8 September	(England) Wigan, Robin Park Tennis Centre	Jamie Hughes (94.23)	5 – 2	Cody Harris (80.72)	
14	Saturday 8 September	(England) Wigan, Robin Park Tennis Centre	Krzysztof Ratajski (90.39)	5 – 2	Mick Todd (83.20)	
15	Sunday 9 September	(England) Wigan, Robin Park Tennis Centre	Cameron Menzies (93.94)	5 – 0	Mark Frost (90.67)	
16	Sunday 9 September	(England) Wigan, Robin Park Tennis Centre	Lee Budgen (86.51)	5 – 3	Michael Barnard (94.56)	
17	Saturday 10 November	Peterborough, East of England Showground	David Evans (88.46)	5 – 2	Ryan Murray (86.12)	
18	Saturday 10 November	Peterborough, East of England Showground	Jonathan Worsley (96.64)	5 – 2	Cody Harris (90.09)	
19	Sunday 11 November	Peterborough, East of England Showground	Michael Rasztovits (97.38)	5 − 3	Andy Boulton (93.53)	
20	Sunday 11 November	Peterborough, East of England Showground	Ted Evetts (88.72)	5 − 4	David Evans (98.98)	

== PDC Development Tour ==
As with the previous year, the 2018 PDC Development Tour series consisted of 20 events, held over 5 weekends.

No.	Date	Venue	Winner	Legs	Runner-up	Ref.
1	Saturday 14 April	(England) Wigan, Robin Park Tennis Centre	Nathan Rafferty (82.98)	5 – 3	Dawson Murschell (82.86)	
2	Saturday 14 April	(England) Wigan, Robin Park Tennis Centre	Wessel Nijman (89.54)	5 – 4	Bradley Brooks (85.59)	
3	Sunday 15 April	(England) Wigan, Robin Park Tennis Centre	Rob Hewson (86.96)	5 – 3	Melvin de Fijter (73.99)	
4	Sunday 15 April	(England) Wigan, Robin Park Tennis Centre	Niels Zonneveld (80.16)	5 – 2	Joe Davis (74.91)	
5	Saturday 26 May	(Germany) Hildesheim, Halle 39	Rowby-John Rodriguez	5 – 0	George Killington	
6	Saturday 26 May	(Germany) Hildesheim, Halle 39	Kenny Neyens	5 – 2	Jarred Cole	
7	Sunday 27 May	(Germany) Hildesheim, Halle 39	Luke Humphries	5 – 2	Niels Zonneveld	
8	Sunday 27 May	(Germany) Hildesheim, Halle 39	Ted Evetts	5 – 2	Geert Nentjes	
9	Saturday 9 June	(England) Wigan, Robin Park Tennis Centre	Martin Schindler (98.88)	5 – 0	Dimitri Van den Bergh (93.24)	
10	Saturday 9 June	(England) Wigan, Robin Park Tennis Centre	Martin Schindler (94.29)	5 – 1	George Gardner (85.97)	
11	Sunday 10 June	(England) Wigan, Robin Park Tennis Centre	Ryan Meikle (89.04)	5 – 3	Rowby-John Rodriguez (82.26)	
12	Sunday 10 June	(England) Wigan, Robin Park Tennis Centre	Ted Evetts (87.00)	5 – 2	Dimitri Van den Bergh (91.42)	
13	Saturday 22 September	Peterborough, East of England Showground	Luke Humphries (81.85)	5 – 4	Justin van Tergouw (89.59)	
14	Saturday 22 September	Peterborough, East of England Showground	George Killington (87.20)	5 – 3	Christian Bunse (85.68)	
15	Sunday 23 September	Peterborough, East of England Showground	Dimitri Van den Bergh (84.52)	5 – 3	Lee Budgen (84.23)	
16	Sunday 23 September	Peterborough, East of England Showground	Jarred Cole (96.68)	5 – 1	Christian Bunse (91.03)	
17	Saturday 3 November	(England) Wigan, Robin Park Tennis Centre	Luke Humphries (94.92)	5 – 1	Bradley Brooks (82.55)	
18	Saturday 3 November	(England) Wigan, Robin Park Tennis Centre	Berry van Peer (89.01)	5 – 4	Geert Nentjes (89.76)	
19	Sunday 4 November	(England) Wigan, Robin Park Tennis Centre	Dimitri Van den Bergh (84.29)	5 – 3	Geert Nentjes (84.27)	
20	Sunday 4 November	(England) Wigan, Robin Park Tennis Centre	Ted Evetts (93.41)	5 – 4	Christian Bunse (83.12)	

== Professional Darts Corporation Nordic & Baltic ==
The PDCNB replaced the events in Norway and Latvia with new events in Lithuania and Iceland in 2018. As with 2017, there were 10 events held over 5 weekends. Two players from the Tour earned a 2019 PDC World Darts Championship spot, Darius Labanauskas and Daniel Larsson.

No.	Date	Venue	Winner	Legs	Runner-up	Ref.
1	Saturday 27 January	(Denmark) Copenhagen, Hotel Park Inn by Radisson	Kim Viljanen	6 – 2	Ulf Ceder	
2	Sunday 28 January	(Denmark) Copenhagen, Hotel Park Inn by Radisson	Daniel Larsson	6 – 4	Darius Labanauskas	
3	Saturday 24 February	(Lithuania) Vilnius, Panorama Hotel	Darius Labanauskas	6 – 5	Cor Dekker	
4	Sunday 25 February	(Lithuania) Vilnius, Panorama Hotel	Darius Labanauskas	6 – 5	Daniel Larsson	
5	Saturday 26 May	(Finland) Vääksy, Hotelli Tallukka	Marko Kantele (95.06)	6 – 2	Ulf Ceder (86.01)	
6	Sunday 27 May	(Finland) Vääksy, Hotelli Tallukka	Cor Dekker (87.84)	6 – 3	Magnus Caris (82.63)	
7	Saturday 11 August	(Sweden) Gothenburg, Apple Hotel & Konferens	Daniel Larsson	6 – 3	Kim Viljanen	
8	Sunday 12 August	(Sweden) Gothenburg, Apple Hotel & Konferens	Marko Kantele	6 – 5	Darius Labanauskas	
9	Saturday 6 October	(Iceland) Reykjavík, City Park Hotel	Madars Razma (93.42)	6 – 2	Magnus Caris (89.40)	
10	Sunday 7 October	(Iceland) Reykjavík, City Park Hotel	Madars Razma (89.44)	6 – 4	Marko Kantele (88.01)	

== Professional Darts Corporation Asia ==
The PDC introduced the PDC Asian Tour in 2018, with 12 events held over 6 weekends. Five players from the Tour earned a 2019 PDC World Darts Championship spot after Seigo Asada won the Japanese Qualifier. The other players to qualify were Lourence Ilagan, Royden Lam, Noel Malicdem and Paul Lim.

No.	Date	Venue	Winner	Legs	Runner-up	Ref.
1	Saturday 10 March	(South Korea) Seoul, KBS Sports World	Royden Lam (91.82)	5 – 3	Noel Malicdem (83.38)	
2	Sunday 11 March	(South Korea) Seoul, KBS Sports World	Seigo Asada (83.34)	5 – 4	Park Hyun-Chul (76.44)	
3	Saturday 28 April	Macau, Regency Art Hotel	Lourence Ilagan (90.57)	5 – 2	Alexis Toylo (77.02)	
4	Sunday 29 April	Macau, Regency Art Hotel	Lourence Ilagan (91.78)	5 – 1	Royden Lam (86.84)	
5	Saturday 23 June	(Japan) Kobe, Kobe Port Terminal	Royden Lam (91.39)	5 – 3	Seigo Asada (85.62)	
6	Sunday 24 June	(Japan) Kobe, Kobe Port Terminal	Noel Malicdem (89.46)	5 – 0	Daisuke Akamatsu (82.04)	
7	Saturday 18 August	(Malaysia) Kuala Lumpur, Grand Centro Ballroom	Seigo Asada (86.47)	5 – 4	Royden Lam (79.64)	
8	Sunday 19 August	(Malaysia) Kuala Lumpur, Grand Centro Ballroom	Lourence Ilagan (87.90)	5 – 1	Harith Lim (73.13)	
9	Saturday 8 September	(Taiwan) Taipei, G Club	Seigo Asada (89.60)	5 – 4	Paul Lim (87.85)	
10	Sunday 9 September	(Taiwan) Taipei, G Club	Paul Lim (92.39)	5 – 3	Lourence Ilagan (99.00)	
11	Saturday 13 October	(Philippines) Manila, Crown Plaza Manila Galleria Ballroom	Lourence Ilagan (93.21)	5 – 4	Val Capuyan (87.57)	
12	Sunday 14 October	(Philippines) Manila, Crown Plaza Manila Galleria Ballroom	Noel Malicdem (99.70)	5 – 2	Paul Lim (93.68)	

== Dartplayers Australia (DPA) Pro Tour ==
The leading player of the 18 tournaments on the 2018 DPA Tour series qualified for the 2019 PDC World Darts Championship. That player was Raymond Smith.

No.	Date	Venue	Winner	Legs	Runner-up	Ref.
1	Friday 16 February	(Australia) St Clair, Blue Cattle Dog Hotel	Raymond Smith	6 – 4	Tim Pusey	
2	Saturday 17 February	(Australia) St Clair, Blue Cattle Dog Hotel	James Bailey	6 – 5	Steve MacArthur	
3	Sunday 18 February	(Australia) St Clair, Blue Cattle Dog Hotel	James Bailey	6 – 5	Steve MacArthur	
4	Friday 23 March	(Australia) Seaford, Seaford Hotel	Corey Cadby	6 – 1	Gordon Mathers	
5	Saturday 24 March	(Australia) Seaford, Seaford Hotel	Raymond Smith	6 – 4	Steve MacArthur	
6	Sunday 25 March	(Australia) Seaford, Seaford Hotel	Mal Cuming	6 – 5	James Bailey	
7	Friday 13 April	(Australia) Barrack Heights, Warilla Bowls and Recreation Club	Corey Cadby	6 – 4	Lucas Cameron	
8	Saturday 14 April	(Australia) Barrack Heights, Warilla Bowls and Recreation Club	Corey Cadby	6 – 3	Laurence Ryder	
9	Sunday 15 April	(Australia) Barrack Heights, Warilla Bowls and Recreation Club	Corey Cadby	6 – 0	Laurence Ryder	
10	Friday 18 May	(Australia) Mitchelton, Brook Hotel	Corey Cadby	6 – 2	Tim Pusey	
11	Saturday 19 May	(Australia) Mitchelton, Brook Hotel	Corey Cadby	6 – 3	Raymond Smith	
12	Sunday 20 May	(Australia) Mitchelton, Brook Hotel	Corey Cadby	6 – 5	Raymond Smith	
13	Friday 15 June	(Australia) North Hobart, Australian Italian Club	Raymond Smith	6 – 4	Steve MacArthur	
14	Saturday 16 June	(Australia) North Hobart, Australian Italian Club	Raymond Smith	6 – 5	Lucas Cameron	
15	Sunday 17 June	(Australia) North Hobart, Australian Italian Club	Gordon Mathers	6 – 4	James Bailey	
16	Friday 7 September	(Australia) Mitchelton, Brook Hotel	Raymond Smith	6 – 2	Gordon Mathers	
17	Saturday 8 September	(Australia) Mitchelton, Brook Hotel	Mark Smyth	6 – 4	James Bailey	
18	Sunday 9 September	(Australia) Mitchelton, Brook Hotel	Tim Pusey	6 – 4	Robbie King	

== Euroasian Darts Corporation (EADC) Pro Tour ==
There were 6 EADC Pro Tour events in 2018. Players from Armenia, Azerbaijan, Belarus, Georgia, Kazakhstan, Kyrgyzstan, Moldova, Russia, Tajikistan, Turkmenistan, Uzbekistan and Ukraine are eligible to play.

No.	Date	Venue	Winner	Legs	Runner-up	Ref.
1	Saturday 24 February	(Russia) Moscow, Omega Plaza Business Center	Aleksandr Oreshkin	6 – 4	Maxim Aldoshin	
2	Sunday 25 February	(Russia) Moscow, Omega Plaza Business Center	Maxim Aldoshin	6 – 4	Vladimir Akshulakov	
3	Sunday 29 April	(Russia) Moscow, Omega Plaza Business Center	Aleksei Kadochnikov	6 – 1	Maxim Aldoshin	
4	Sunday 29 April	(Russia) Moscow, Omega Plaza Business Center	Aleksei Kadochnikov	6 – 4	Maxim Aldoshin	
5	Monday 30 April	(Russia) Moscow, Omega Plaza Business Center	Roman Obukhov	6 – 5	Aleksei Kadochnikov	
6	Monday 30 April	(Russia) Moscow, Omega Plaza Business Center	Aleksei Kadochnikov	6 – 0	Dmitriy Gorbunov	

== Championship Darts Circuit Pro Tour ==
The top American and Canadian players over the 2018 CDC Tour qualified for the 2019 PDC World Darts Championship. Chuck Puleo and Jim Long took the two places.

No.	Date	Venue	Winner	Legs	Runner-up	Ref.
1	Saturday 28 April	(United States) Chicago, North Shore Holiday Inn	Gary Mawson (88.72)	6 – 5	Darin Young (83.59)	
2	Sunday 29 April	(United States) Chicago, North Shore Holiday Inn	Chuck Puleo (83.80)	6 – 4	Jim Long (81.39)	
3	Saturday 19 May	(United States) Miamisburg, Moose Lodge #1645	Leonard Gates (86.37)	6 – 5	DJ Sayre (83.12)	
4	Sunday 20 May	(United States) Miamisburg, Moose Lodge #1645	Darin Young (85.11)	6 – 5	Chuck Puleo (82.69)	
5	Saturday 23 June	(Canada) Burlington, Royal Canadian Legion Branch 60	Leonard Gates (94.68)	6 – 1	Darin Young (80.43)	
6	Sunday 24 June	(Canada) Burlington, Royal Canadian Legion Branch 60	Darin Young (81.53)	6 – 5	Matt Campbell (88.62)	
7	Saturday 4 August	(United States) New York City, Knights of Baron DeKalb	Nick Linberg (81.70)	6 – 3	Rob Modra (77.94)	
8	Sunday 5 August	(United States) New York City, Knights of Baron DeKalb	Chuck Puleo (87.91)	6 – 1	Darin Young (71.59)	
9	Saturday 25 August	(United States) Philadelphia, Columbia Social Club	John Part (84.22)	6 – 2	Danny Lauby (83.98)	
10	Sunday 26 August	(United States) Philadelphia, Columbia Social Club	Chuck Puleo (88.10)	6 – 4	Jim Widmayer (82.99)	

== World Championship International Qualifiers ==
Date	Event	Venue	Winner	Score	Runner-up	Ref.
Thursday 5 July	North American Championship	(United States) Las Vegas, Mandalay Bay	Jeff Smith (85.10)	6 – 4	John Norman Jnr (81.18)	
Friday 13 July	DartPlayers New Zealand Qualifier	(New Zealand) Invercargill, Working Mens Club	Tahuna Irwin (89.04)	7 – 2	Craig Ross (85.20) (Note: Tahuna Irwin withdrew from the World Championship following an immigration issue. Craig Ross, the qualifier runner-up, replaced him.)	
Saturday 15 September	South/Central American Qualifier	(Brazil) Palmas, Hotel Girassol Plaza	Diogo Portela	6 – 4	Sudesh Fitzgerald	
Saturday 22 September	Eastern Europe Qualifier	(Hungary) Vecsés, Bálint Ágnes Cultural Center	Karel Sedláček (79.17)	6 – 4	Pál Székely (80.43)	
Saturday 6 October	South/East Europe Qualifier	(Switzerland) Oberglatt, Chliriethalle Oberglatt	Rowby-John Rodriguez	6 – 4	Rusty-Jake Rodriguez	
Saturday 6 October	Tom Kirby Memorial Irish Matchplay	(Republic of Ireland) Dublin, Citywest Hotel	Kevin Burness (79.66)	6 – 3	Mick McGowan (80.79)	
Sunday 7 October	PDJ Japan Championship	(Japan) Tokyo, Ota City Industrial Plaza PiO	Seigo Asada (79.98)	5 – 1	Shingo Enomata (73.04)	
Sunday 7 October	Western Europe Qualifier	(Netherlands) Zwolle, IJsselhallen	Yordi Meeuwisse	6 – 3	Fabian Roosenbrand	
Saturday 20 October	South/West Europe Qualifier	(Spain) Ávila, Lienzo Norte Congress and Exhibition Center	José de Sousa (86.93)	6 – 4	Jesús Noguera (88.72)	
Sunday 28 October	Euroasian Darts Corporation Qualifier	(Russia) Moscow, Omega Plaza Business Center	Boris Koltsov (93.94)	3 – 0	Aleksei Kadochnikov (75.02)	
Sunday 28 October	Indian Qualifier	(India) Pune, The Orbis School Auditorium	Nitin Kumar (78.28)	5 – 0	Ankit Goenka (61.42)	
Tuesday 30 October	Oceanic Masters	(Australia) Barrack Heights, Warilla Bowls and Recreation Club	James Bailey (84.68)	3 – 2	Tim Pusey (86.41)	
Sunday 11 November	PDC Chinese Qualifier	(China) Shanghai, Caohejing Hi-Tech Park	Yuanjun Liu (73.50)	5 – 2	Xiaochen Zong (77.70)	
Saturday 17 November	Rest of the World Women's Qualifier	(Germany) Düsseldorf, Maritim Hotel	Anastasia Dobromyslova	6 – 0	Silvia Keller	
Sunday 18 November	German Super League	(Germany) Düsseldorf, Maritim Hotel	Robert Marijanović (93.72)	10 – 6	Dragutin Horvat (88.59)	
Sunday 18 November	African Qualifier	(South Africa) Johannesburg, Dinwiddie Sports Club	Devon Petersen	7 – 2	Nolan Arendse	
Sunday 25 November	World Youth Championship	(England) Minehead, Butlin's	Dimitri Van den Bergh (100.44)	6 – 3	Martin Schindler (91.60)	
Sunday 25 November	UK & Ireland Women's Qualifier	(England) Milton Keynes, Arena MK	Lisa Ashton (83.27)	6 – 3	Maria O'Brien (74.18)	
Monday 26 November	Tour Card Holders' Qualifier	(England) Milton Keynes, Arena MK	Adam Hunt (90.11)	7 – 4	Richie Burnett (91.99)	
Monday 26 November	Tour Card Holders' Qualifier	(England) Milton Keynes, Arena MK	Aden Kirk (94.44)	7 – 6	Madars Razma (96.38)	
Monday 26 November	Tour Card Holders' Qualifier	(England) Milton Keynes, Arena MK	Stephen Burton (93.10)	7 – 6	Scott Taylor (93.49)	
