= 2018 Dutch Darts Championship =

Tournament information
- Dates: 7–9 September 2018
- Venue: MECC Maastricht
- Location: Maastricht, Netherlands
- Organisation(s): Professional Darts Corporation (PDC)
- Format: Legs
- Prize fund: £135,000
- Winner's share: £25,000
- High checkout: 170 Ritchie Edhouse

Champion(s)
- Ian White (ENG)

The 2018 Dutch Darts Championship was the eleventh of thirteen PDC European Tour events on the 2018 PDC Pro Tour. The tournament took place at the MECC Maastricht, Maastricht, Netherlands from 7 to 9 September 2018. It featured a field of 48 players and £135,000 in prize money, with £25,000 going to the winner.

Ian White won his tenth PDC title and his first on the European Tour, defeating Ricky Evans 8–5 in the final.

== Prize money ==
This is how the prize money is divided:

Stage (num. of players)		Prize money
Winner	(1)	£25,000
Runner-up	(1)	£10,000
Semi-finalists	(2)	£6,000
Quarter-finalists	(4)	£4,000
Third round losers	(8)	£3,000
Second round losers	(16)	£2,000
First round losers	(16)	£1,000
Total	£135,000	

Prize money will count towards the PDC Order of Merit, the ProTour Order of Merit and the European Tour Order of Merit, with one exception: should a seeded player lose in the second round (last 32), their prize money will not count towards any Orders of Merit, although they still receive the full prize money payment.

== Qualification and format ==
The top 16 entrants from the PDC Pro Tour Order of Merit on 30 August will automatically qualify for the event and will be seeded in the second round.

The remaining 32 places will go to players from five qualifying events – 18 from the UK Qualifier (held in Barnsley on 3 September), eight from the West/South European Qualifier (held on 30 August), four from the Host Nation Qualifier (held on 6 September), one from the Nordic & Baltic Qualifier (held on 10 August) and one from the East European Qualifier (held on 25 August).

Mensur Suljović, who would have been the number 3 seed, withdrew from the tournament prior to the draw. Steve West, the highest-ranked qualifier, was promoted to 16th seed. Erik Tautfest also withdrew prior to the draw. Two extra places were made available in the Host Nation Qualifier.

The following players will take part in the tournament:

Top 16
1. (Netherlands) Michael van Gerwen (second round)
2. (Scotland) Peter Wright (semi-finals)
3. (England) Ian White (champion)
4. (Wales) Jonny Clayton (second round)
5. (England) James Wade (second round)
6. (England) Adrian Lewis (quarter-finals)
7. (Australia) Simon Whitlock (quarter-finals)
8. (England) Joe Cullen (quarter-finals)
9. (Northern Ireland) Daryl Gurney (third round)
10. (Wales) Gerwyn Price (second round)
11. (England) Darren Webster (second round)
12. (Germany) Max Hopp (second round)
13. (England) Stephen Bunting (second round)
14. (England) Mervyn King (third round)
15. (England) Dave Chisnall (third round)
16. (England) Steve West (second round)

UK Qualifier
- (Wales) Barrie Bates (second round)
- (England) James Wilson (first round)
- (England) Kevin Painter (second round)
- (England) Ross Smith (third round)
- (England) Arron Monk (second round)
- (England) Andy Boulton (first round)
- (Australia) Kyle Anderson (quarter-finals)
- (England) Josh Payne (third round)
- (England) Wayne Jones (second round)
- (Canada) Dawson Murschell (first round)
- (Republic of Ireland) William O'Connor (third round)
- (Australia) Paul Nicholson (first round)
- (England) Ritchie Edhouse (semi-finals)
- (England) Darren Johnson (third round)
- (Scotland) Robert Thornton (first round)
- (England) Ricky Evans (runner-up)
- (England) Ryan Searle (second round)

West/South European Qualifier
- (Germany) Christian Bunse (first round)
- (Austria) Rowby-John Rodriguez (second round)
- (Germany) Kevin Münch (first round)
- (Spain) Cristo Reyes (second round)
- (Spain) Toni Alcinas (first round)
- (Austria) Rusty-Jake Rodriguez (first round)
- (Germany) Robert Marijanović (first round)

Host Nation Qualifier
- (Netherlands) Jan Dekker (first round)
- (Netherlands) Jelle Klaasen (first round)
- (Netherlands) Jeffrey de Zwaan (first round)
- (Netherlands) Dirk van Duijvenbode (first round)
- (Netherlands) Vincent van der Voort (first round)
- (Netherlands) Jeffrey de Graaf (third round)

Nordic & Baltic Qualifier
- (Lithuania) Darius Labanauskas (second round)

East European Qualifier
- (Czech Republic) Karel Sedláček (first round)

== Draw ==
First round (best of 11 legs); 7 September
(Czech Republic) Karel Sedláček 76.17	2
(Republic of Ireland) William O'Connor 88.75	6
(England) Ricky Evans 95.32	6
(Netherlands) Jan Dekker 94.99	3
(Wales) Barrie Bates 86.18	6
(Netherlands) Jelle Klaasen 85.32	3
(England) Ryan Searle 94.40	6
(England) Andy Boulton 88.68	3
(Canada) Dawson Murschell 82.03	4
(England) Ritchie Edhouse 88.95	6
(England) Ross Smith 96.91	6
(Austria) Rusty-Jake Rodriguez 88.40	2
(Australia) Kyle Anderson 99.10	6
(Germany) Christian Bunse 80.72	0
(Netherlands) Jeffrey de Graaf 91.25	6
(Australia) Paul Nicholson 92.93	5
(England) Kevin Painter 89.21	6
(Netherlands) Vincent van der Voort 87.17	5
(Austria) Rowby-John Rodriguez 100.71	6
(Germany) Robert Marijanović 90.38	3
(England) James Wilson 94.40	4
(Spain) Cristo Reyes 96.04	6
(Germany) Kevin Münch 77.73	4
(England) Darren Johnson 83.11	6
(Netherlands) Jeffrey de Zwaan 90.88	2
(England) Wayne Jones 89.79	6
(England) Josh Payne 92.87	6
(Netherlands) Dirk van Duijvenbode 85.78	3
(Scotland) Robert Thornton 87.75	3
(England) Arron Monk 92.12	6
(Spain) Toni Alcinas 88.39	3
(Lithuania) Darius Labanauskas 93.15	6

Second round (best of 11 legs); 8 September
1	(Netherlands) Michael van Gerwen 87.91	1
(Republic of Ireland) William O'Connor 95.97	6
16	(England) Steve West 87.75	5
(England) Ricky Evans 88.16	6
8	(England) Joe Cullen 89.09	6
(Wales) Barrie Bates 87.08	4
9	(Northern Ireland) Daryl Gurney 100.64	6
(England) Ryan Searle 100.59	5
5	(England) James Wade 92.64	4
(England) Ritchie Edhouse 90.63	6
12	(Germany) Max Hopp 94.10	5
(England) Ross Smith 98.09	6
4	(Wales) Jonny Clayton 85.47	3
(Australia) Kyle Anderson 95.09	6
13	(England) Stephen Bunting 91.24	3
(Netherlands) Jeffrey de Graaf 97.02	6
2	(Scotland) Peter Wright 92.88	6
(England) Kevin Painter 94.18	2
15	(England) Dave Chisnall 92.15	6
(Austria) Rowby-John Rodriguez 88.23	3
7	(Australia) Simon Whitlock 90.29	6
(Spain) Cristo Reyes 83.36	1
10	(Wales) Gerwyn Price 94.59	5
(England) Darren Johnson 91.13	6
6	(England) Adrian Lewis 97.97	6
(England) Wayne Jones 90.38	1
11	(England) Darren Webster 93.86	3
(England) Josh Payne 90.45	6
3	(England) Ian White 102.26	6
(England) Arron Monk 99.81	4
14	(England) Mervyn King 86.18	6
(Lithuania) Darius Labanauskas 83.62	2

Third round (best of 11 legs); 9 September
(Republic of Ireland) O'Connor 86.53	2
(England) Evans 90.32	6
8	(England) Cullen 98.60	6
9	(Northern Ireland) Gurney 97.70	4
(England) Edhouse 93.71	6
(England) Smith 90.10	2
(Australia) Anderson 97.56	6
(Netherlands) de Graaf 84.35	1
2	(Scotland) Wright 90.96	6
15	(England) Chisnall 94.26	1
7	(Australia) Whitlock 99.46	6
(England) Johnson 91.13	4
6	(England) Lewis 89.71	6
(England) Payne 91.37	5
3	(England) White 99.67	6
14	(England) King 90.10	2

Quarter-finals (best of 11 legs); 9 September
(England) Evans 91.81	6
8	(England) Cullen 95.05	5
(England) Edhouse 92.65	6
(Australia) Anderson 87.92	4
2	(Scotland) Wright 100.47	6
7	(Australia) Whitlock 90.10	4
6	(England) Lewis 90.97	1
3	(England) White 99.17	6

Semi-finals (best of 13 legs); 9 September
(England) Evans 92.03	7
(England) Edhouse 94.99	5
2	(Scotland) Wright 100.05	4
3	(England) White 98.41	7

Final (best of 15 legs); 9 September
(England) Evans 89.23	5
3	(England) White 89.18	8
