= 2018 European Darts Trophy =

Tournament information
- Dates: 12–14 October 2018
- Venue: Lokhalle
- Location: Göttingen, Germany
- Organisation(s): Professional Darts Corporation (PDC)
- Format: Legs
- Prize fund: £135,000
- Winner's share: £25,000
- High checkout: 170 Michael van Gerwen

Champion(s)
- Michael van Gerwen (NED)

The 2018 European Darts Trophy was the thirteenth of thirteen PDC European Tour events on the 2018 PDC Pro Tour. The tournament took place at the Lokhalle, Göttingen, Germany from 12 to 14 October 2018. It featured a field of 48 players and £135,000 in prize money, with £25,000 going to the winner.

Michael van Gerwen was the defending champion after defeating Rob Cross 6–4 in 2017's final.

Van Gerwen won his third consecutive European Darts Trophy title and his 28th European Tour title in total after an 8–3 win over James Wade in the final.

== Prize money ==
This is how the prize money is divided:

Stage (num. of players)		Prize money
Winner	(1)	£25,000
Runner-up	(1)	£10,000
Semi-finalists	(2)	£6,000
Quarter-finalists	(4)	£4,000
Third round losers	(8)	£3,000
Second round losers	(16)	£2,000
First round losers	(16)	£1,000
Total	£135,000	

Prize money will count towards the PDC Order of Merit, the ProTour Order of Merit and the European Tour Order of Merit, with one exception: should a seeded player lose in the second round (last 32), their prize money will not count towards any Orders of Merit, although they still receive the full prize money payment.

== Qualification and format ==
The top 16 entrants from the PDC ProTour Order of Merit on 12 September will automatically qualify for the event and will be seeded in the second round.

The remaining 32 places will go to players from five qualifying events – 18 from the UK Qualifier (held in Dublin on 27 September), eight from the West/South European Qualifier (held on 13 September), four from the Host Nation Qualifier (held on 11 October), one from the Nordic & Baltic Qualifier (held on 11 August) and one from the East European Qualifier (held on 26 August).

Mensur Suljović and Adrian Lewis, who would have been the number 6 and 7 seeds respectively, withdrew from the tournament prior to the draw. Mervyn King and Stephen Bunting, the highest-ranked qualifiers, were promoted to 15th and 16th seed respectively, which meant an extra two places were made available in the Host Nation Qualifier.

The following players took part in the tournament:

Top 16
1. (Netherlands) Michael van Gerwen (champion)
2. (Scotland) Peter Wright (second round)
3. (England) Rob Cross (quarter-finals)
4. (England) Ian White (second round)
5. (England) Michael Smith (semi-finals)
6. (England) James Wade (runner-up)
7. (Wales) Jonny Clayton (third round)
8. (England) Joe Cullen (second round)
9. (Northern Ireland) Daryl Gurney (quarter-finals)
10. (Australia) Simon Whitlock (second round)
11. (England) Darren Webster (third round)
12. (Wales) Gerwyn Price (second round)
13. (England) Dave Chisnall (quarter-finals)
14. (Germany) Max Hopp (third round)
15. (England) Mervyn King (second round)
16. (England) Stephen Bunting (third round)

UK Qualifier
- (England) Mark Wilson (first round)
- (England) Steve West (first round)
- (Scotland) John Henderson (third round)
- (England) Ricky Evans (second round)
- (England) Luke Humphries (second round)
- (England) Matthew Edgar (third round)
- (England) Steve Beaton (third round)
- (England) Keegan Brown (first round)
- (England) Luke Woodhouse (first round)
- (Northern Ireland) Mickey Mansell (second round)
- (England) Andrew Gilding (first round)
- (England) George Killington (first round)
- (England) Richard North (semi-finals)
- (England) Ryan Joyce (second round)
- (Northern Ireland) Brendan Dolan (first round)
- (England) Simon Stevenson (first round)

West/South European Qualifier
- (Netherlands) Jeffrey de Zwaan (second round)
- (Netherlands) Jelle Klaasen (quarter-finals)
- (Spain) Toni Alcinas (second round)
- (Netherlands) Vincent van der Voort (second round)
- (Netherlands) Jeffrey de Graaf (first round)
- (Netherlands) Danny Noppert (first round)
- (Netherlands) Jermaine Wattimena (first round)
- (Belgium) Kim Huybrechts (first round)

Host Nation Qualifier
- (Germany) Martin Schindler (third round)
- (Germany) Maik Langendorf (first round)
- (Germany) Steffen Siepmann (first round)
- (Germany) Christian Bunse (first round)
- (Germany) Robert Marijanović (first round)
- (Germany) Gabriel Clemens (second round)

Nordic & Baltic Qualifier
- (Finland) Marko Kantele (second round)

East European Qualifier
- (Poland) Krzysztof Ratajski (second round)

== Draw ==
First round (best of 11 legs); 12 October
(England) Simon Stevenson 94.36	3
(Netherlands) Vincent van der Voort 103.96	6
(Northern Ireland) Mickey Mansell 87.76	6
(England) George Killington 81.77	2
(England) Matthew Edgar 89.62	6
(Netherlands) Jeffrey de Graaf 86.65	3
(England) Luke Humphries 96.56	6
(England) Keegan Brown 86.52	4
(Finland) Marko Kantele 88.16	6
(Germany) Robert Marijanović 84.83	3
(Belgium) Kim Huybrechts 96.22	5
(England) Steve Beaton 93.91	6
(England) Mark Wilson 85.79	5
(Scotland) John Henderson 94.48	6
(England) Ryan Joyce 88.37	6
(Netherlands) Jermaine Wattimena 81.00	1
(Germany) Maik Langendorf 81.58	4
(Netherlands) Jelle Klaasen 88.51	6
(England) Luke Woodhouse 82.43	3
(Germany) Martin Schindler 91.44	6
(Germany) Gabriel Clemens 92.30	6
(Northern Ireland) Brendan Dolan 86.72	3
(England) Richard North 78.04	6
(Germany) Christian Bunse 82.30	3
(Netherlands) Danny Noppert 95.70	5
(Spain) Toni Alcinas 96.30	6
(England) Ricky Evans 104.73	6
(England) Andrew Gilding 80.41	1
(Netherlands) Jeffrey de Zwaan 89.32	6
(Germany) Steffen Siepmann 83.66	3
(Poland) Krzysztof Ratajski 93.94	6
(England) Steve West 89.45	5

Second round (best of 11 legs); 13 October
1	(Netherlands) Michael van Gerwen 101.63	6
(Netherlands) Vincent van der Voort 95.96	2
16	(England) Stephen Bunting 103.11	6
(Northern Ireland) Mickey Mansell 82.35	2
8	(England) Joe Cullen 88.01	5
(England) Matthew Edgar 90.17	6
9	(Northern Ireland) Daryl Gurney 93.83	6
(England) Luke Humphries 92.60	3
5	(England) Michael Smith 93.40	6
(Finland) Marko Kantele 81.42	1
12	(Wales) Gerwyn Price 90.86	5
(England) Steve Beaton 96.63	6
4	(England) Ian White 97.94	4
(Scotland) John Henderson 95.26	6
13	(England) Dave Chisnall 93.02	6
(England) Ryan Joyce 88.48	5
2	(Scotland) Peter Wright 87.78	3
(Netherlands) Jelle Klaasen 91.59	6
15	(England) Mervyn King 84.25	0
(Germany) Martin Schindler 90.18	6
7	(Wales) Jonny Clayton 100.31	6
(Germany) Gabriel Clemens 96.43	2
10	(Australia) Simon Whitlock 97.16	4
(England) Richard North 100.89	6
6	(England) James Wade 101.76	6
(Spain) Toni Alcinas 98.35	4
11	(England) Darren Webster 96.63	6
(England) Ricky Evans 90.87	3
3	(England) Rob Cross 95.92	6
(Netherlands) Jeffrey de Zwaan 93.32	4
14	(Germany) Max Hopp 90.80	6
(Poland) Krzysztof Ratajski 86.95	5

Third round 14 October (best of 11 legs)
1	(Netherlands) van Gerwen 106.46	6
16	(England) Bunting 96.69	4
(England) Edgar 88.45	3
9	(Northern Ireland) Gurney 92.35	6
5	(England) Smith 103.66	6
(England) Beaton 99.89	0
(Scotland) Henderson 80.80	0
13	(England) Chisnall 112.63	6
(Netherlands) Klaasen 92.19	6
(Germany) Schindler 93.24	5
7	(Wales) Clayton 97.66	1
(England) North 99.18	6
6	(England) Wade 90.39	6
11	(England) Webster 88.51	3
3	(England) Cross 97.95	6
14	(Germany) Hopp 101.62	5

Quarter-finals; 14 October (best of 11 legs)
1	(Netherlands) van Gerwen 106.53	6
9	(Northern Ireland) Gurney 107.11	2
5	(England) Smith 102.78	6
13	(England) Chisnall 89.69	2
(Netherlands) Klaasen 99.21	3
(England) North 96.09	6
6	(England) Wade 97.42	6
3	(England) Cross 95.95	3

Semi-finals; 14 October (best of 13 legs)
1	(Netherlands) van Gerwen 102.07	7
5	(England) Smith 93.62	2
(England) North 99.29	4
6	(England) Wade 98.91	7

Final; 14 October (best of 15 legs)
1	(Netherlands) van Gerwen 111.27	8
6	(England) Wade 79.09	3
