= Darts in India =

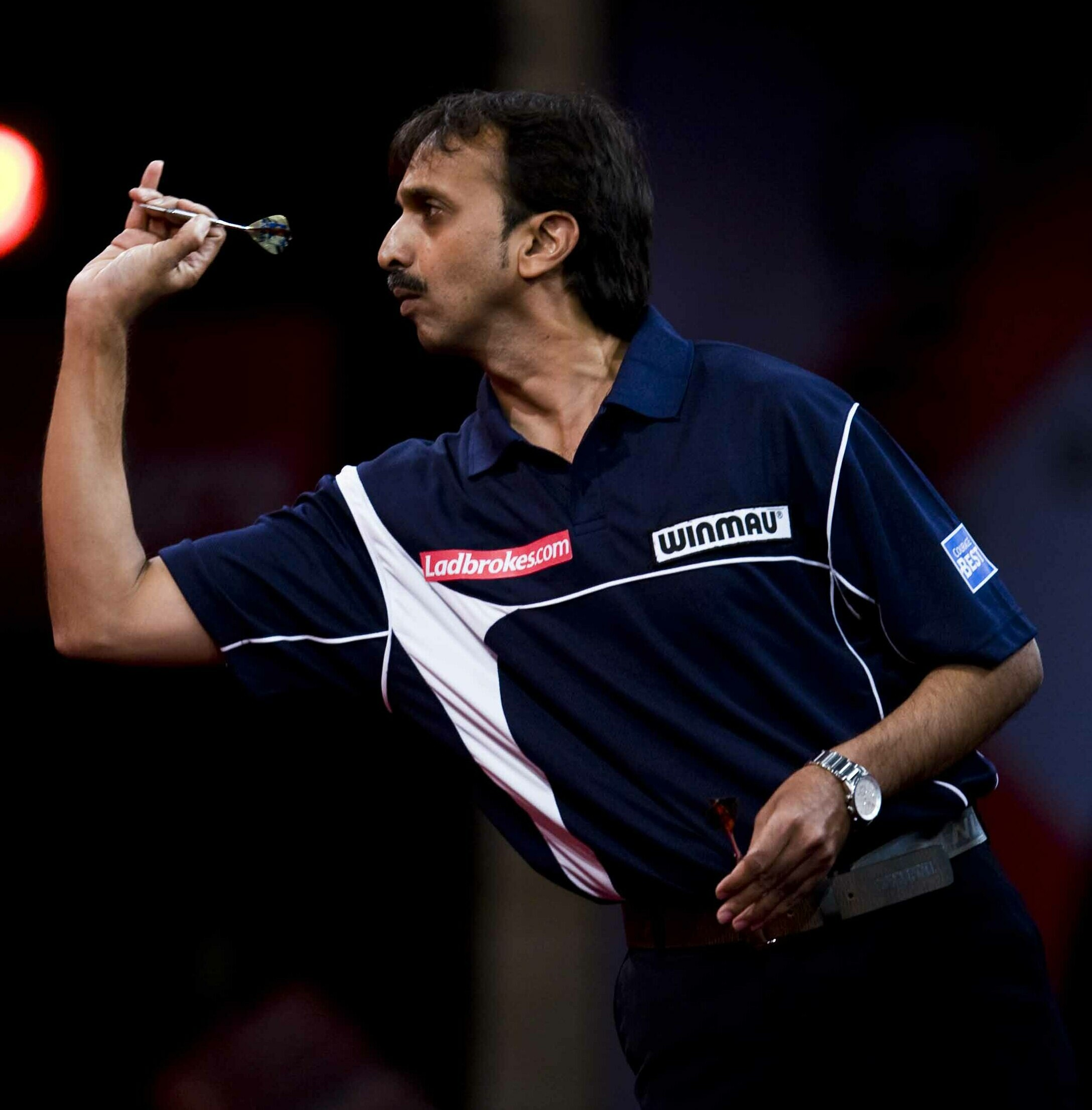
- Ashfaque Sayed at the World Darts Championship in 2007
- Country: India
- Governing body: Indian Darts Council, All India Darts Association
- National team: India

Darts is a growing sport in India, attracting attention from various parts of the country. It is a sport that is considered to have huge potential in India. While traditionally more popular in Western countries, the sport has gradually gained a foothold in India, with increasing participation in both recreational and competitive settings.

There are two organisations that oversee darts in India, the Indian Darts Council and the All India Darts Association.

The Goa National Rankings Darts Championship was held in 2022. Ten teams participated in the 6th UP Darts Sports Championship in Uttar Pradesh in June 2023.

== Prominent players ==
- Nitin Kumar from Tamil Nadu, one of the country's top-ranked players, has represented India at multiple international events, including the PDC World Darts Championship.
- Ashfaque Sayed of Maharashtra represented India in the PDC World Cup of Darts in 2007.
- Aradhya Nigam, although never trained professionally, won the annual MSKCC fellowship darts contest in 2025 and has his eyes set on the 2026 title.

== See also ==
- Category:Indian darts players
