= 2018 European Darts Grand Prix =

Professional darts tournament

Tournament information
- Dates: 4–6 May 2018
- Venue: Glaspalast
- Location: Sindelfingen
- Country: Germany
- Organisation(s): PDC
- Format: Legs
- Prize fund: £135,000
- Winner's share: £25,000
- High checkout: 164 (England) Darren Webster (third round)

Champion(s)
- (Netherlands) Michael van Gerwen

The 2018 European Darts Grand Prix was the fifth of thirteen PDC European Tour events on the 2018 PDC Pro Tour. The tournament took place at Glaspalast, Sindelfingen, Germany, between 4–6 May 2018. It featured a field of 48 players and £135,000 in prize money, with £25,000 going to the winner.

Peter Wright was the defending champion after defeating Michael van Gerwen 6–0 in the 2017 final, but he was defeated 6–5 in the third round to Danny Noppert.

Michael van Gerwen won the tournament for a second time, defeating James Wade 8–3 in the final whilst averaging over 109 for the third successive game.

== Prize money ==
This is how the prize money is divided:

Stage (num. of players)		Prize money
Winner	(1)	£25,000
Runner-up	(1)	£10,000
Semi-finalists	(2)	£6,000
Quarter-finalists	(4)	£4,000
Third round losers	(8)	£3,000
Second round losers	(16)	£2,000
First round losers	(16)	£1,000
Total	£135,000	

Prize money will count towards the PDC Order of Merit, the ProTour Order of Merit and the European Tour Order of Merit, with one exception: should a seeded player lose in the second round (last 32), their prize money will not count towards any Orders of Merit, although they still receive the full prize money payment.

== Qualification and format ==
The top 16 entrants from the PDC ProTour Order of Merit on 27 March will automatically qualify for the event and will be seeded in the second round.

The remaining 32 places will go to players from five qualifying events – 18 from the UK Qualifier (held in Barnsley on 6 April), eight from the West/South European Qualifier (held on 3 May), four from the Host Nation Qualifier (held on 3 May), one from the Nordic & Baltic Qualifier (held on 23 February) and one from the East European Qualifier (held on 28 January).

Adrian Lewis withdrew prior to the draw through illness, and was replaced by a Host Nation Qualifier.

The following players will take part in the tournament:

Top 16
1. (Netherlands) Michael van Gerwen (winner)
2. (Scotland) Peter Wright (third round)
3. (England) Rob Cross (third round)
4. (England) Michael Smith (semi-finals)
5. (Northern Ireland) Daryl Gurney (second round)
6. (Austria) Mensur Suljović (third round)
7. (England) Joe Cullen (quarter-finals)
8. (England) Dave Chisnall (quarter-finals)
9. (England) Ian White (third round)
10. (Belgium) Kim Huybrechts (second round)
11. (Australia) Simon Whitlock (quarter-finals)
12. (England) Mervyn King (second round)
13. (Netherlands) Jelle Klaasen (second round)
14. (Scotland) John Henderson (second round)
15. (Wales) Gerwyn Price (second round)
16. (England) Darren Webster (third round)

UK Qualifier
- (Australia) Kyle Anderson (third round)
- (England) Stephen Bunting (first round)
- (Wales) Robert Owen (first round)
- (England) Matt Padgett (second round)
- (England) ~~Adrian Lewis (withdrew)~~
- (England) Alan Tabern (second round)
- (England) James Wade (runner-up)
- (England) Arron Monk (second round)
- (Canada) Dawson Murschell (first round)
- (England) Ricky Evans (first round)
- (England) Steve Hine (first round)
- (England) Peter Hudson (first round)
- (Australia) Paul Nicholson (third round)
- (England) Jamie Caven (second round)
- (England) Andy Boulton (first round)
- (Wales) Jamie Lewis (quarter-finals)
- (Republic of Ireland) Steve Lennon (first round)
- (England) Kirk Shepherd (second round)

West/South European Qualifier
- (Spain) Toni Alcinas (first round)
- (Netherlands) Vincent van der Voort (second round)
- (Netherlands) Danny Noppert (semi-finals)
- (Netherlands) Mats Gies (first round)
- (Netherlands) Jan Dekker (second round)
- (Netherlands) Mareno Michels (first round)
- (Netherlands) Jermaine Wattimena (third round)
- (Belgium) Dimitri Van den Bergh (first round)

Host Nation Qualifier
- (Germany) Max Hopp (first round)
- (Germany) Martin Schindler (second round)
- (Germany) Gabriel Clemens (first round)
- (Germany) Christian Bunse (first round)
- (Germany) Robert Marijanović (second round)

Nordic & Baltic Qualifier
- (Latvia) Madars Razma (second round)

East European Qualifier
- (Poland) Krzysztof Ratajski (first round)

== Draw ==
First round (best of 11 legs); 4 May
(England) Alan Tabern 93.59	6
(Netherlands) Mats Gies 80.77	3
(Germany) Robert Marijanović 84.49	6
(England) Andy Boulton 92.37	3
(Belgium) Dimitri Van den Bergh 92.66	4
(England) Matt Padgett 89.74	6
(England) Steve Hine 88.05	4
(Latvia) Madars Razma 90.10	6
(Wales) Jamie Lewis 91.11	6
(Germany) Christian Bunse 80.73	4
(Australia) Paul Nicholson 95.71	6
(Canada) Dawson Murschell 89.68	2
(England) Peter Hudson 83.78	3
(England) Arron Monk 85.63	6
(Netherlands) Jermaine Wattimena 91.49	6
(Spain) Toni Alcinas 88.55	5
(England) Stephen Bunting 91.70	2
(England) Kirk Shepherd 93.93	6
(Poland) Krzysztof Ratajski 91.60	3
(Netherlands) Danny Noppert 99.73	6
(Germany) Martin Schindler 89.29	6
(Wales) Robert Owen 73.97	0
(Australia) Kyle Anderson 94.28	6
(England) Ricky Evans 92.32	4
(England) Jamie Caven 84.89	6
(Netherlands) Mareno Michels 77.47	1
(Netherlands) Jan Dekker 89.29	6
(Germany) Gabriel Clemens 87.59	3
(Netherlands) Vincent van der Voort 103.40	6
(Republic of Ireland) Steve Lennon 90.49	4
(England) James Wade 92.08	6
(Germany) Max Hopp 89.81	4

Second round (best of 11 legs); 5 May
1	(Netherlands) Michael van Gerwen 103.04	6
(England) Alan Tabern 92.62	2
16	(England) Darren Webster 88.57	6
(Germany) Robert Marijanović 80.98	3
8	(England) Dave Chisnall 89.45	6
(England) Matt Padgett 84.70	5
9	(England) Ian White 92.04	6
(Latvia) Madars Razma 90.97	1
5	(Northern Ireland) Daryl Gurney 96.73	4
(Wales) Jamie Lewis 93.00	6
12	(England) Mervyn King 93.75	4
(Australia) Paul Nicholson 93.74	6
4	(England) Michael Smith 95.33	6
(England) Arron Monk 89.91	5
13	(Netherlands) Jelle Klaasen 89.45	3
(Netherlands) Jermaine Wattimena 89.10	6
2	(Scotland) Peter Wright 110.29	6
(England) Kirk Shepherd 95.11	2
15	(Wales) Gerwyn Price 101.33	5
(Netherlands) Danny Noppert 97.16	6
7	(England) Joe Cullen 98.22	6
(Germany) Martin Schindler 99.53	5
10	(Belgium) Kim Huybrechts 98.10	4
(Australia) Kyle Anderson 99.82	6
6	(Austria) Mensur Suljović 93.11	6
(England) Jamie Caven 94.07	5
11	(Australia) Simon Whitlock 99.10	6
(Netherlands) Jan Dekker 89.86	0
3	(England) Rob Cross 102.47	6
(Netherlands) Vincent van der Voort 93.54	5
14	(Scotland) John Henderson 94.51	4
(England) James Wade 94.78	6

Third round (best of 11 legs); 6 May
1	(Netherlands) van Gerwen 104.80	6
16	(England) Webster 99.95	5
8	(England) Chisnall 107.04	6
9	(England) White 95.43	5
(Wales) Lewis 89.16	6
(Australia) Nicholson 95.34	5
4	(England) Smith 98.32	6
(Netherlands) Wattimena 87.78	3
2	(Scotland) Wright 103.49	5
(Netherlands) Noppert 94.45	6
7	(England) Cullen 105.89	6
(Australia) Anderson 97.68	3
6	(Austria) Suljović 100.82	4
11	(Australia) Whitlock 98.65	6
3	(England) Cross 98.50	5
(England) Wade 100.52	6

Quarter-finals (best of 11 legs); 6 May
1	(Netherlands) van Gerwen 109.54	6
8	(England) Chisnall 107.57	4
(Wales) Lewis 81.25	2
4	(England) Smith 89.91	6
(Netherlands) Noppert 91.09	6
7	(England) Cullen 90.63	5
11	(Australia) Whitlock 86.79	3
(England) Wade 90.60	6

Semi-finals (best of 13 legs); 6 May
1	(Netherlands) van Gerwen 109.59	7
4	(England) Smith 90.43	0
(Netherlands) Noppert 96.49	3
(England) Wade 96.60	7

Final (best of 15 legs); 6 May
1	(Netherlands) van Gerwen 110.87	8
(England) Wade 98.38	3
