= 2019 PDC World Darts Championship =

26th edition of the PDC's World Championship event

2018/19 William Hill World Darts Championship

Tournament information
- Dates: 13 December 2018 – 1 January 2019
- Venue: Alexandra Palace
- Location: London, England
- Organisation(s): Professional Darts Corporation (PDC)
- Format: Sets; Final – best of 13
- Prize fund: £2,500,000
- Winner's share: £500,000
- High checkout: 170; Brendan Dolan; Luke Humphries; Michael van Gerwen

Champion(s)
- Michael van Gerwen (NED)

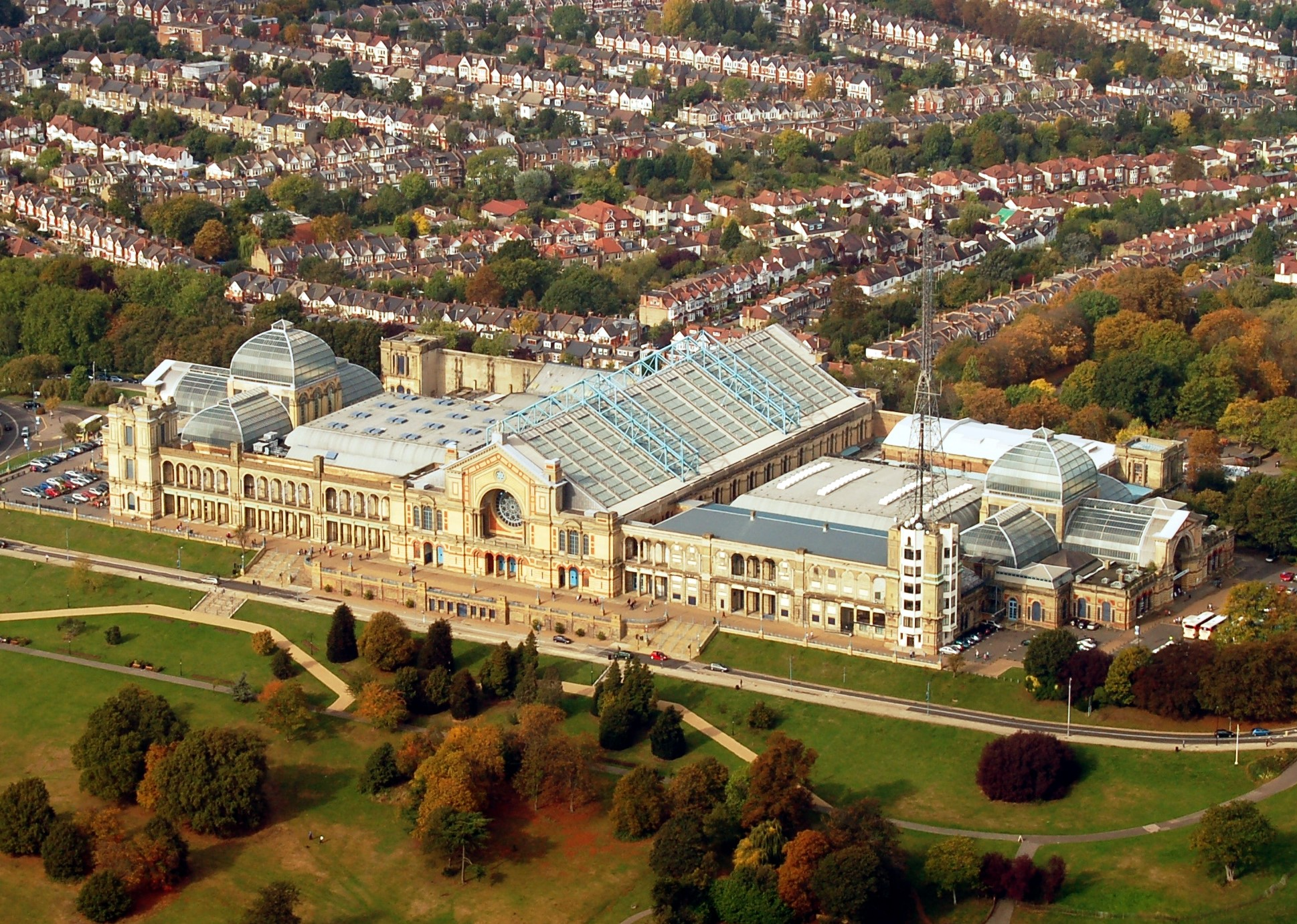
Alexandra Palace, London, hosted the PDC World Championship for the twelfth time.

The 2019 PDC World Darts Championship (known for sponsorship reasons as the 2018/19 William Hill World Darts Championship) was the twenty-sixth World Championship organised by the Professional Darts Corporation since it separated from the British Darts Organisation. The event took place at Alexandra Palace in London from 13 December 2018 to 1 January 2019.

In the biggest overhaul since 2006, when 16 extra participants were added, the number of participants increased from 72 to 96. The top 32 from the PDC Order of Merit competed with the 32 highest ranked players on the PDC Pro Tour Order of Merit and 32 qualifiers from around the world, including two female darts players. The tournament length was consequently increased from six to seven rounds, while the preliminary round was dropped. The tournament was played in 28 afternoon and evening sessions (an increase of six sessions over 2018) over the 20-day period with four rest days included for both Christmas and also New Year's Eve, with 95 matches played.

Rob Cross was the defending champion, but lost 4–2 to Luke Humphries in the fourth round. Michael van Gerwen won his third world title with a 7–3 victory over Michael Smith.

It was the first PDC World Championship without retired Phil Taylor, and the first time Taylor had not played in either World Championship since 1989. 2004 runner-up Kevin Painter was also a notable absentee, failing to qualify for the first time since 1997, when he was a BDO player.

== Prize money ==
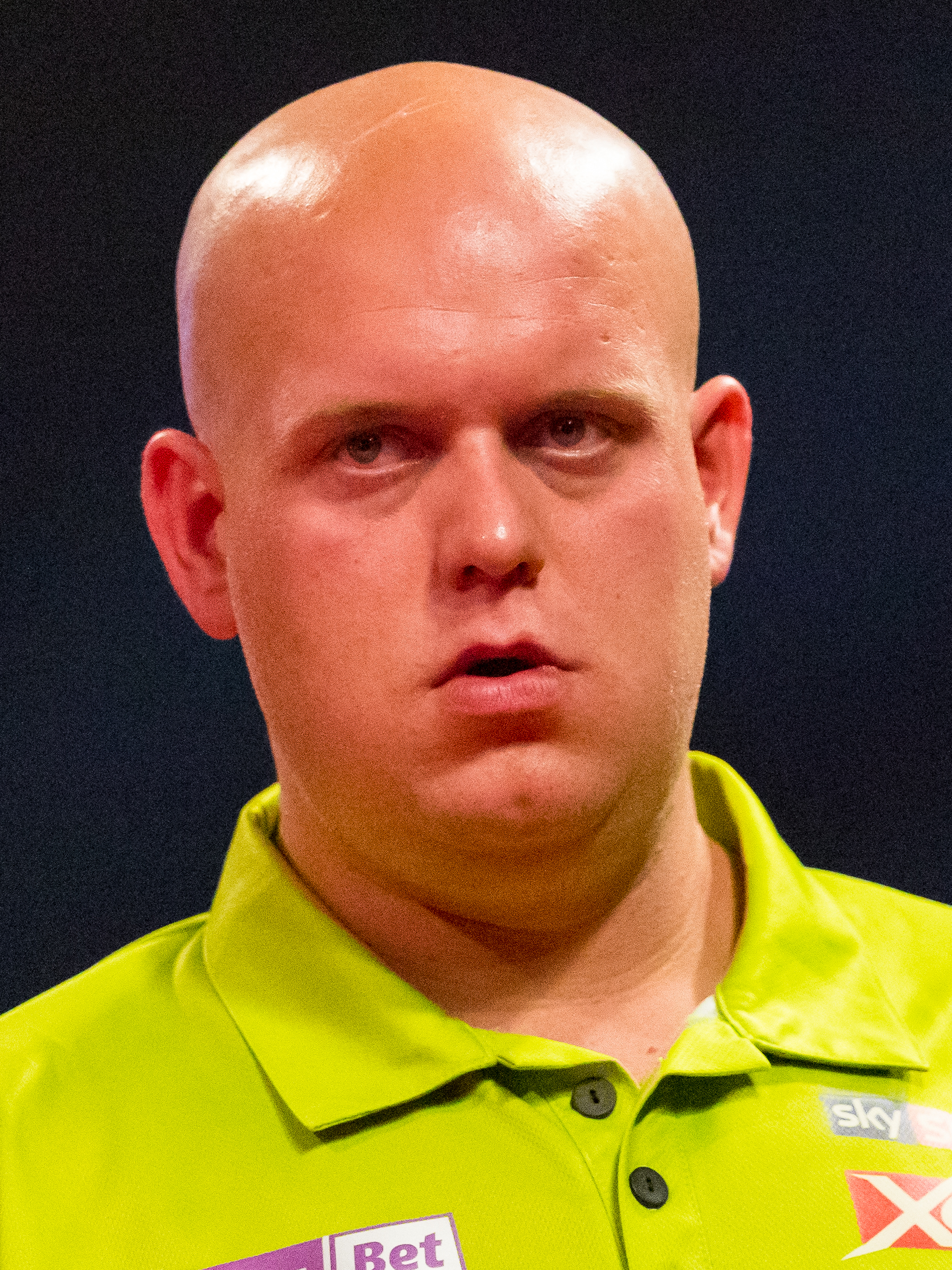
Number-one seed Michael van Gerwen won the World Championship for the third time in his career.

The prize money for the tournament was £2,500,000 in total, £700,000 more than 2018. The winner's prize money was £500,000, adding £100,000 to the previous year's winners share.

It was the first ever World Darts Championship to match Snooker in prize money received for the eventual World Champion during the same calendar year. At the time of the last unified World Darts Championship in 1993 the Snooker World Champion received almost 6 times more prize money than the Darts equivalent. It would also be the first World Darts Championship to have a greater overall prize fund to that of the World Snooker Championship. (Compared to 8x more prize money for the Crucible over Lakeside in 1993)

Position (num. of players)		Prize money (Total: £2,500,000)
Winner	(1)	£500,000
Runner-up	(1)	£200,000
Semi-finalists	(2)	£100,000
Quarter-finalists	(4)	£50,000
Fourth round losers	(8)	£35,000
Third round losers	(16)	£25,000
Second round losers	(32)	£15,000
First round losers	(32)	£7,500

== Qualification ==
=== Qualifiers ===
Click on the seed number of a player to go to their draw section.

Order of Merit
Second round (seeded)

1. (Netherlands) Michael van Gerwen (champion)
2. (England) Rob Cross (fourth round)
3. (Scotland) Peter Wright (second round)
4. (Scotland) Gary Anderson (semi-finals)
5. (Northern Ireland) Daryl Gurney (third round)
6. (Wales) Gerwyn Price (second round)
7. (Austria) Mensur Suljović (second round)
8. (Australia) Simon Whitlock (second round)
9. (England) James Wade (fourth round)
10. (England) Michael Smith (runner-up)
11. (England) Ian White (second round)
12. (England) Dave Chisnall (quarter-finals)
13. (England) Darren Webster (second round)
14. (England) Joe Cullen (second round)
15. (Wales) Jonny Clayton (second round)
16. (England) Adrian Lewis (fourth round)
17. (Netherlands) Raymond van Barneveld (second round)
18. (England) Stephen Bunting (second round)
19. (England) Mervyn King (third round)
20. (England) Steve Beaton (second round)
21. (Belgium) Kim Huybrechts (third round)
22. (England) Steve West (third round)
23. (Scotland) John Henderson (third round)
24. (Netherlands) Jelle Klaasen (second round)
25. (England) Alan Norris (third round)
26. (England) James Wilson (second round)
27. (Australia) Kyle Anderson (third round)
28. (Wales) Jamie Lewis (fourth round)
29. (Netherlands) Jermaine Wattimena (third round)
30. (Netherlands) Benito van de Pas (fourth round)
31. (Spain) Cristo Reyes (third round)
32. (Germany) Max Hopp (third round)

Pro Tour Order of Merit
First Round

1. (Netherlands) Danny Noppert (second round)
2. (Poland) Krzysztof Ratajski (first round)
3. (England) Ricky Evans (first round)
4. (Netherlands) Jeffrey de Zwaan (second round)
5. (Republic of Ireland) Steve Lennon (second round)
6. (England) Chris Dobey (fourth round)
7. (Germany) Martin Schindler (first round)
8. (England) Josh Payne (second round)
9. (Germany) Gabriel Clemens (second round)
10. (England) Ryan Joyce (quarter-finals)
11. (England) Richard North (second round)
12. (England) Keegan Brown (third round)
13. (Northern Ireland) Mickey Mansell (first round)
14. (Scotland) Robert Thornton (first round)
15. (Netherlands) Jan Dekker (second round)
16. (England) Nathan Aspinall (semi-finals)
17. (Netherlands) Ron Meulenkamp (second round)
18. (Northern Ireland) Brendan Dolan (quarter-finals)
19. (Republic of Ireland) William O'Connor (third round)
20. (Netherlands) Vincent van der Voort (third round)
21. (England) Michael Barnard (second round)
22. (Spain) Toni Alcinas (third round)
23. (Australia) Paul Nicholson (first round)
24. (England) Simon Stevenson (first round)
25. (England) Luke Humphries (quarter-finals)
26. (Netherlands) Jeffrey de Graaf (first round)
27. (Belgium) Dimitri Van den Bergh (third round)
28. (England) Alan Tabern (second round)
29. (England) Wayne Jones (first round)
30. (England) Ross Smith (second round)
31. (England) Ryan Searle (fourth round)
32. (England) Matthew Edgar (first round) (Note: Corey Cadby, who was originally 28th on the Pro Tour list, was forced to withdraw from the field, with Matthew Edgar his replacement as the highest ranked Pro Tour player not yet qualified.)

International Qualifiers
First round

- (Japan) Seigo Asada – PDJ Qualifier (second round)
- (England) Lisa Ashton – Women's Qualifier (first round)
- (Australia) James Bailey – Oceanic Masters (first round)
- (Northern Ireland) Kevin Burness – Irish Matchplay Champion (second round)
- (England) Stephen Burton – PDPA Qualifier (first round)
- (Portugal) José de Sousa – South/West Europe Qualifier (first round)
- (Russia) Anastasia Dobromyslova – Women's Qualifier (first round)
- (England) Ted Evetts – Development Tour (second round)
- (New Zealand) Cody Harris – Challenge Tour (second round)
- (England) Adam Hunt – PDPA Qualifier (first round)
- (Philippines) Lourence Ilagan – Asian Tour (first round)
- (England) Aden Kirk – PDPA Qualifier (first round)
- (Russia) Boris Koltsov – Euroasian Qualifier (first round)
- (India) Nitin Kumar – Indian Qualifier (first round)
- (Lithuania) Darius Labanauskas – PDCNB (third round)
- (Hong Kong) Royden Lam – Asian Tour (first round)
- (Sweden) Daniel Larsson – PDCNB (second round)
- (Singapore) Paul Lim – Asian Tour (first round)
- Yuanjun Liu – China Qualifier (first round)
- (Canada) Jim Long – CDC Tour (second round)
- (Philippines) Noel Malicdem – Asian Tour (second round)
- (Germany) Robert Marijanović – German Super League (first round)
- (Netherlands) Yordi Meeuwisse – Western Europe Qualifier (first round)
- (Netherlands) Geert Nentjes – Development Tour (first round)
- (South Africa) Devon Petersen – Africa Qualifier (fourth round)
- (Brazil) Diogo Portela – SADC Qualifier (first round)
- (United States) Chuck Puleo – CDC Tour (first round)
- (Austria) Rowby-John Rodriguez – South/East Europe Qualifier (second round)
- (New Zealand) Craig Ross – DPNZ Runner-up (first round) (Note: Tahuna Irwin, winner of the DPNZ Qualifier, was banned from entering the United Kingdom following an issue when attempting to enter for the 2018 PDC World Youth Championship. Craig Ross, the runner-up of the DPNZ Qualifier, was his replacement.)
- (Czech Republic) Karel Sedláček – East Europe Qualifier (first round)
- (Canada) Jeff Smith – North American Champion (first round)
- (Australia) Raymond Smith – DPA Tour (first round)

=== Background ===
96 players competed in the championship, an increase of 24 from the 2018 tournament; with the thirty-two highest ranked players on the PDC Order of Merit being seeded to the second round, and the next thirty-two highest ranked players from the 2018 PDC Pro Tour Order of Merit and thirty-two players from a number of international and invitational qualifiers going into the first round.

Michael van Gerwen, the winner of the 2014 and 2017 championships, was top of the two-year PDC Order of Merit and number one seed going into the tournament. Rob Cross was second seed and reigning champion, having won the 2018 championship on his debut. As well as van Gerwen and Cross, three other previous PDC world champions qualified as seeds, two-time champions Gary Anderson and Adrian Lewis, and 2007 champion Raymond van Barneveld. Three other seeds, 18th seeded Stephen Bunting, 20th seeded Steve Beaton and 24th seeded Jelle Klaasen, were previous champions of the BDO World Darts Championship, as was van Barneveld.

The top seeds below van Gerwen and Cross were 2018 World Grand Prix runner-up Peter Wright, Gary Anderson, 2018 Players Championship Finals winner Daryl Gurney and 2018 Grand Slam of Darts winner Gerwyn Price.

Danny Noppert, in his debut year with the PDC, was the highest ranked non-seed on the 2018 PDC Pro Tour Order of Merit. As well as Noppert, 5 other qualifiers through the Pro Tour made their debut; Gabriel Clemens, Ryan Joyce, Nathan Aspinall, Ryan Searle and Matthew Edgar. Edgar took the final qualification place after 2018 UK Open runner-up Corey Cadby withdrew. The list of qualifiers also included the 2018 Youth Champion Dimitri Van den Bergh and 2018 World Matchplay semi-finalist Jeffrey de Zwaan.

As part of the expansion of the world championship, there was an increase in the number of tournaments and ranking systems offering qualification places. Places were now offered to the winner of the Challenge Tour, the top two from the Development Tour (where previously only the winner had qualified), the top four of the new Asian Tour, and the top American and Canadian players on the North American Championship Darts Circuit. Previous qualification places to the top two players on the Nordic & Baltic rankings and the winner of the Dartplayers Australia rankings also remained.

The international qualifiers included new Indian and African qualifiers, and the Southern Europe qualifier being split into South/West and South/East. Tahuna Irwin, who won the New Zealand qualifier, had to withdraw after being denied entry to the UK, and subsequently being banned from entry, when attempting to compete in the 2018 PDC World Youth Championship. His place was given to the New Zealand runner-up, Craig Ross.

The tournament also saw two tournaments to qualify female players for the tournament. This followed the wildcard invitations of Gayl King to the 2001 tournament and Anastasia Dobromyslova to the 2009 tournament, and also came in the wake of the qualification of China's Momo Zhou for the 2018 PDC World Cup of Darts. Dobromyslova, three times BDO women's world champion, returned to the PDC championship after winning the rest of the world tournament, while the UK tournament was won by four time women's world champion, and reigning 2018 champion, Lisa Ashton.

The final placings were determined by the PDPA qualifier held at Arena MK on 26 November, with two places as standard and an extra place as Youth Champion Van den Bergh had already qualified. Stephen Burton, Adam Hunt and Aden Kirk took the three places, all three of them making their debuts.

In addition to the three PDPA qualifiers, 15 more of the international qualifiers were making their PDC World Championship debuts, Lisa Ashton, James Bailey, Kevin Burness, Nitin Kumar, Darius Labanauskas, Daniel Larsson, Yuanjun Liu, Jim Long, Noel Malicdem, Yordi Meeuwisse, Geert Nentjes, Chuck Puleo, Craig Ross, Karel Sedláček and Raymond Smith. Labanauskas was the first ever Lithuanian to qualify for the PDC World Championship.

== Summary ==
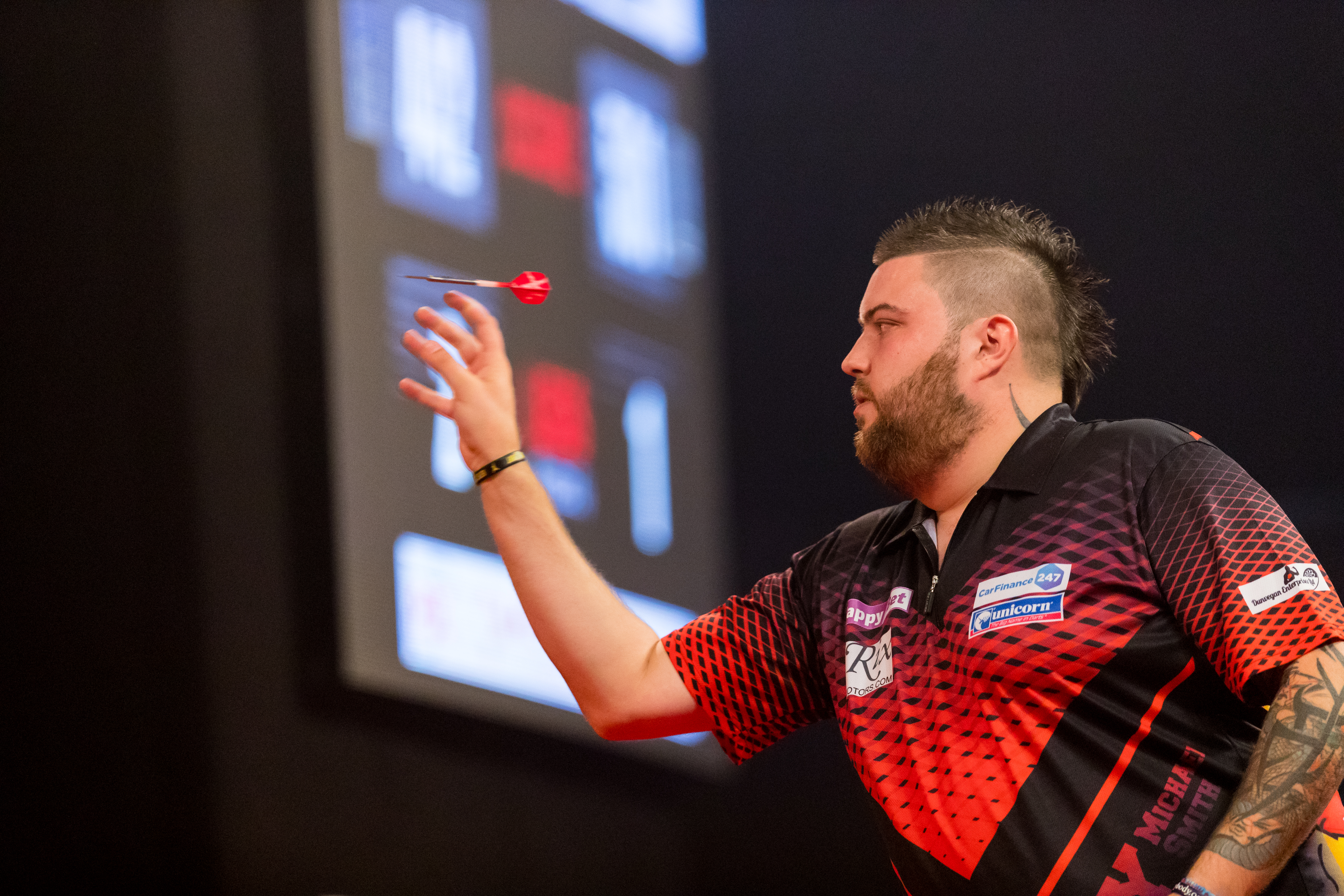
Michael Smith, the tenth seed, was runner-up after reaching his first World Championship final.

The top quarter of the draw saw number one seed Michael van Gerwen easily reach the quarter-final, knocking Alan Tabern out in the second round despite having beer thrown at him during the walk on, before consecutive 4–1 victories over Max Hopp and former world champion Adrian Lewis. Other former champion Raymond van Barneveld was eliminated in the second round following a 3–2 loss to Darius Labanauskas. James Wade controversially beat Seigo Asada in the second round, having been perceived to have shouted in his opponent's face after winning the second set, and saying after the match that he "wanted to hurt" Asada; Wade subsequently apologised, citing a hypomania episode. Wade was eliminated in the fourth round by debutant Ryan Joyce. In the quarter-final, van Gerwen triumphed over Joyce, 5–1, to qualify for the semi-final for the sixth time in seven championships.

In the second quarter, fourth seed Gary Anderson had to come through last-set deciders against Jermaine Wattimena and Chris Dobey to reach the quarter-final, while fifth-seed Daryl Gurney was eliminated in the third round by 2018 semi-finalist Jamie Lewis. Dave Chisnall came back from 0–2 down against Josh Payne to run off eleven consecutive sets over three matches, beating Payne 3–2 before 4–0 wins over Kim Huybrechts and Lewis. In the quarter-final, Anderson won 5–2 against Chisnall to set up a semi-final with van Gerwen.

In the third quarter, reigning champion Rob Cross defeated Jeffrey de Zwaan in the second round, before beating Cristo Reyes 4–0 in the third round. Two-time consecutive world youth champion Dimitri Van den Bergh was beaten by two-time consecutive Development Tour winner Luke Humphries in the third round. In round four, Humphries played Cross. The defending champion went 2–0 up, before Humphries fought back to win 4–2 and end Cross's reign. Seventh-seed Mensur Suljović was eliminated by Ryan Searle, and tenth-seed Michael Smith eliminated Ron Meulenkamp before beating John Henderson and Searle to reach the quarter-final. Smith secured a semi-final slot with a 5–1 win over Humphries.

In the fourth quarter, the four top seeds were eliminated in the second round, with third-seed Peter Wright losing to Toni Alcinas, sixth-seed Gerwyn Price being eliminated by Nathan Aspinall, eleventh-seeded Ian White losing to South African Devon Petersen and Brendan Dolan whitewashing fourteenth seed Joe Cullen. Further seeds were eliminated in the third round, with thirtieth seed Benito van de Pas being the only seed from this quarter in the fourth round, and unseeded players Aspinall, Petersen and Dolan taking the other three slots. Aspinall defeated Petersen, with Dolan getting a 4–1 win over van de Pas to reach the quarter-final. In the quarter-final, Aspinall easily beat Dolan 5–1 to reach the semi-final on his debut year.

In the first semi-final, Aspinall played Smith. Smith won the first two sets without dropping a leg, before Aspinall came back to make it 2–2. Each player won one of the next two sets to make it 3–3, before Smith won two consecutive sets 3–1 and the final set 3–0 to win the match and qualify for the first World Championship final of his career. Smith scored 17 180s, the most by a player in a World Championship semi-final.

In the second semi-final, Anderson played van Gerwen in a repeat of the 2017 final. After van Gerwen won the first set in a last-leg decider, he then won twelve of the next thirteen legs to quickly take a 5–0 lead in the first-to-six match. Anderson managed to avoid the whitewash by winning the sixth set, but van Gerwen completed the rout in the next set, qualifying for the final for the fourth time in his career.

In the final, held on New Year's Day 2019, van Gerwen won the first two legs before missing one set-dart in each of the next two legs for Smith to force a last-leg set decider, which van Gerwen won. Van Gerwen broke Smith's throw with a 3–1 win in the second set, and lengthened his lead by taking the third set by the same scoreline. Smith lost the fourth set after missing four darts at double 12 in the decider, but won the fifth set 3–2 to avoid the whitewash and took the sixth set 3–0. Van Gerwen restored his three-set advantage with a 3–1 win in the seventh set. Smith missed three darts for the eighth set, which van Gerwen won to go one set away from victory. The ninth set went to a deciding leg, which Smith won to prolong the match. Van Gerwen took the first two legs in the tenth set, and missed one dart for the championship in the third leg; in the next, he hit double 16 to take the set and win the World Championship for the third time.

== Schedule ==
Thursday, 13 December

Game #	Round	Player 1	Score	Player 2	Set 1	Set 2	Set 3	Set 4	Set 5
01	1	(Netherlands) Jeffrey de Zwaan	3 – 0	Nitin Kumar (India)	3 – 0	3 – 2	3 – 1	—N/a	—N/a
02	1	(Germany) Martin Schindler	2 – 3	Cody Harris (New Zealand)	1 – 3	3 – 1	0 – 3	3 – 1	1 – 3
03	1	(Netherlands) Jan Dekker	3 – 1	Lisa Ashton (England)	0 – 3	3 – 0	3 – 2	3 – 1	—N/a
04	2	(England) Rob Cross	3 – 1	Jeffrey de Zwaan (Netherlands)	0 – 3	3 – 2	3 – 1	3 – 1	—N/a

Friday, 14 December

Game #	Round	Player 1	Score	Player 2	Set 1	Set 2	Set 3	Set 4	Set 5
05	1	(England) Michael Barnard	3 – 2	José de Sousa (Portugal)	3 – 2	3 – 2	2 – 3	1 – 3	3 – 2
06	1	(England) Alan Tabern	3 – 2	Raymond Smith (Australia)	3 – 1	3 – 1	2 – 3	1 – 3	3 – 0
07	1	(Australia) Paul Nicholson	0 – 3	Kevin Burness (Northern Ireland)	2 – 3	1 – 3	1 – 3	—N/a	—N/a
08	2	(Wales) Jamie Lewis	3 – 2	Cody Harris (New Zealand)	3 – 1	3 – 1	2 – 3	2 – 3	3 – 0
09	1	(Netherlands) Danny Noppert	3 – 0	Royden Lam (Hong Kong)	3 – 1	3 – 0	3 – 0	—N/a	—N/a
10	1	(England) Simon Stevenson	0 – 3	Ted Evetts (England)	2 – 3	2 – 3	1 – 3	—N/a	—N/a
11	1	(England) Chris Dobey	3 – 0	Boris Koltsov (Russia)	3 – 0	3 – 0	3 – 2	—N/a	—N/a
12	2	(Scotland) Gary Anderson	3 – 1	Kevin Burness (Northern Ireland)	3 – 2	1 – 3	3 – 0	3 – 0	—N/a

Saturday, 15 December

Game #	Round	Player 1	Score	Player 2	Set 1	Set 2	Set 3	Set 4	Set 5
13	1	(England) Richard North	3 – 2	Robert Marijanović (Germany)	2 – 3	2 – 3	3 – 2	3 – 2	3 – 1
14	1	(Northern Ireland) Mickey Mansell	1 – 3	Jim Long (Canada)	3 – 2	2 – 3	0 – 3	2 – 3	—N/a
15	1	(England) Josh Payne	3 – 2	Jeff Smith (Canada)	1 – 3	3 – 1	3 – 0	2 – 3	3 – 0
16	2	(Germany) Max Hopp	3 – 0	Danny Noppert (Netherlands)	3 – 0	3 – 1	3 – 2	—N/a	—N/a
17	1	(Spain) Toni Alcinas	3 – 0	Craig Ross (New Zealand)	3 – 0	3 – 0	3 – 1	—N/a	—N/a
18	1	(England) Ryan Searle	3 – 0	Stephen Burton (England)	3 – 2	3 – 0	3 – 1	—N/a	—N/a
19	1	(England) Keegan Brown	3 – 0	Karel Sedláček (Czech Republic)	3 – 2	3 – 2	3 – 1	—N/a	—N/a
20	2	(Netherlands) Michael van Gerwen	3 – 1	Alan Tabern (England)	3 – 1	3 – 0	2 – 3	3 – 2	—N/a

Sunday, 16 December

Game #	Round	Player 1	Score	Player 2	Set 1	Set 2	Set 3	Set 4	Set 5
21	1	(Germany) Gabriel Clemens	3 – 0	Aden Kirk (England)	3 – 0	3 – 1	3 – 2	—N/a	—N/a
22	1	(Republic of Ireland) William O'Connor	3 – 0	Yordi Meeuwisse (Netherlands)	3 – 1	3 – 2	3 – 2	—N/a	—N/a
23	1	(Northern Ireland) Brendan Dolan	3 – 0	Yuanjun Liu (China)	3 – 0	3 – 0	3 – 1	—N/a	—N/a
24	2	(England) Dave Chisnall	3 – 2	Josh Payne (England)	0 – 3	0 – 3	3 – 2	3 – 1	3 – 1
25	1	(England) Luke Humphries	3 – 0	Adam Hunt (England)	3 – 1	3 – 0	3 – 0	—N/a	—N/a
26	1	(England) Matthew Edgar	1 – 3	Darius Labanauskas (Lithuania)	3 – 1	1 – 3	1 – 3	0 – 3	—N/a
27	1	(England) Ross Smith	3 – 1	Paul Lim (Singapore)	3 – 2	3 – 0	0 – 3	3 – 0	—N/a
28	2	(Scotland) Peter Wright	1 – 3	Toni Alcinas (Spain)	2 – 3	1 – 3	3 – 0	2 – 3	—N/a

Monday, 17 December

Game #	Round	Player 1	Score	Player 2	Set 1	Set 2	Set 3	Set 4	Set 5
29	1	(Netherlands) Vincent van der Voort	3 – 1	Lourence Ilagan (Philippines)	3 – 1	1 – 3	3 – 2	3 – 2	—N/a
30	1	(England) Wayne Jones	2 – 3	Devon Petersen (South Africa)	2 – 3	0 – 3	3 – 0	3 – 2	2 – 3
31	1	(England) Ryan Joyce	3 – 0	Anastasia Dobromyslova (Russia)	3 – 1	3 – 0	3 – 2	—N/a	—N/a
32	2	(Netherlands) Raymond van Barneveld	2 – 3	Darius Labanauskas (Lithuania)	1 – 3	3 – 2	2 – 3	3 – 2	0 – 3

Tuesday, 18 December

Game #	Round	Player 1	Score	Player 2	Set 1	Set 2	Set 3	Set 4	Set 5
33	1	(Scotland) Robert Thornton	1 – 3	Daniel Larsson (Sweden)	1 – 3	3 – 2	1 – 3	2 – 3	—N/a
34	1	(England) Ricky Evans	1 – 3	Rowby-John Rodriguez (Austria)	2 – 3	3 – 1	1 – 3	2 – 3	—N/a
35	1	(Poland) Krzysztof Ratajski	2 – 3	Seigo Asada (Japan)	3 – 2	3 – 1	2 – 3	1 – 3	1 – 3
36	2	(England) Darren Webster	0 – 3	Vincent van der Voort (Netherlands)	1 – 3	0 – 3	0 – 3	—N/a	—N/a
37	1	(Republic of Ireland) Steve Lennon	3 – 0	James Bailey (Australia)	3 – 1	3 – 2	3 – 1	—N/a	—N/a
38	1	(Netherlands) Ron Meulenkamp	3 – 2	Diogo Portela (Brazil)	0 – 3	1 – 3	3 – 1	3 – 1	3 – 1
39	1	(Belgium) Dimitri Van den Bergh	3 – 0	Chuck Puleo (United States)	3 – 0	3 – 1	3 – 2	—N/a	—N/a
40	2	(Northern Ireland) Daryl Gurney	3 – 0	Ross Smith (England)	3 – 2	3 – 0	3 – 0	—N/a	—N/a

Wednesday, 19 December

Game #	Round	Player 1	Score	Player 2	Set 1	Set 2	Set 3	Set 4	Set 5
41	1	(England) Nathan Aspinall	3 – 0	Geert Nentjes (Netherlands)	3 – 1	3 – 1	3 – 2	—N/a	—N/a
42	1	(Netherlands) Jeffrey de Graaf	2 – 3	Noel Malicdem (Philippines)	1 – 3	3 – 1	3 – 2	1 – 3	0 – 3
43	2	(England) Joe Cullen	0 – 3	Brendan Dolan (Northern Ireland)	0 – 3	0 – 3	1 – 3	—N/a	—N/a
44	2	(Belgium) Kim Huybrechts	3 – 0	Daniel Larsson (Sweden)	3 – 0	3 – 0	3 – 0	—N/a	—N/a
45	2	(England) James Wilson	2 – 3	William O'Connor (Republic of Ireland)	3 – 1	1 – 3	1 – 3	3 – 2	1 – 3
46	2	(Australia) Simon Whitlock	0 – 3	Ryan Joyce (England)	2 – 3	1 – 3	1 – 3	—N/a	—N/a
47	2	(England) Michael Smith	3 – 1	Ron Meulenkamp (Netherlands)	3 – 2	3 – 1	1 – 3	3 – 1	—N/a
48	2	(England) James Wade	3 – 2	Seigo Asada (Japan)	1 – 3	3 – 2	2 – 3	3 – 1	4 – 2

Thursday, 20 December

Game #	Round	Player 1	Score	Player 2	Set 1	Set 2	Set 3	Set 4	Set 5
49	2	(Netherlands) Jermaine Wattimena	3 – 0	Michael Barnard (England)	3 – 2	3 – 1	3 – 0	—N/a	—N/a
50	2	(England) Alan Norris	3 – 2	Steve Lennon (Republic of Ireland)	2 – 3	3 – 0	2 – 3	3 – 2	6 – 5
51	2	(England) Stephen Bunting	1 – 3	Luke Humphries (England)	2 – 3	1 – 3	3 – 1	2 – 3	—N/a
52	2	(England) Steve Beaton	0 – 3	Chris Dobey (England)	2 – 3	0 – 3	0 – 3	—N/a	—N/a
53	2	(Spain) Cristo Reyes	3 – 2	Rowby-John Rodriguez (Austria)	2 – 3	2 – 3	3 – 0	3 – 2	3 – 0
54	2	(England) Mervyn King	3 – 2	Jan Dekker (Netherlands)	3 – 2	3 – 0	2 – 3	2 – 3	4 – 2
55	2	(England) Adrian Lewis	3 – 0	Ted Evetts (England)	3 – 2	3 – 2	3 – 1	—N/a	—N/a
56	2	(Austria) Mensur Suljović	1 – 3	Ryan Searle (England)	3 – 1	1 - 3	1 – 3	1 – 3	—N/a

Friday, 21 December

Game #	Round	Player 1	Score	Player 2	Set 1	Set 2	Set 3	Set 4	Set 5
57	2	(Netherlands) Benito van de Pas	3 – 2	Jim Long (Canada)	3 – 1	3 – 1	0 – 3	2 – 3	5 – 3
58	2	(Scotland) John Henderson	3 – 2	Gabriel Clemens (Germany)	3 – 2	2 – 3	2 – 3	3 – 2	3 – 1
59	2	(England) Steve West	3 – 1	Richard North (England)	3 – 0	3 – 2	2 – 3	3 – 2	—N/a
60	2	(Australia) Kyle Anderson	3 – 1	Noel Malicdem (Philippines)	3 – 2	2 – 3	3 – 2	3 – 0	—N/a
61	2	(England) Ian White	2 – 3	Devon Petersen (South Africa)	3 – 1	3 – 0	1 – 3	1 – 3	3 – 5
62	2	(Netherlands) Jelle Klaasen	1 – 3	Keegan Brown (England)	3 – 2	0 – 3	1 – 3	1 – 3	—N/a
63	2	(Wales) Gerwyn Price	2 – 3	Nathan Aspinall (England)	3 – 2	3 – 2	2 – 3	1 – 3	0 – 3
64	2	(Wales) Jonny Clayton	1 – 3	Dimitri Van den Bergh (Belgium)	0 – 3	3 – 1	1 – 3	2 – 3	—N/a

Saturday, 22 December

Game #	Round	Player 1	Score	Player 2	Set 1	Set 2	Set 3	Set 4	Set 5	Set 6	Set 7
65	3	(England) Ryan Joyce	4 – 3	Alan Norris (England)	0 – 3	1 – 3	3 – 2	3 – 1	3 – 2	1 – 3	3 – 1
66	3	(England) Dave Chisnall	4 – 0	Kim Huybrechts (Belgium)	3 – 2	3 – 2	3 – 0	3 – 1	—N/a	—N/a	—N/a
67	3	(Northern Ireland) Daryl Gurney	3 – 4	Jamie Lewis (Wales)	2 – 3	0 – 3	3 – 2	1 – 3	3 – 0	3 – 1	2 – 4
68	3	(England) Ryan Searle	4 – 1	William O'Connor (Republic of Ireland)	1 – 3	3 – 1	3 – 2	3 – 1	3 – 0	—N/a	—N/a
69	3	(Scotland) Gary Anderson	4 – 3	Jermaine Wattimena (Netherlands)	2 – 3	3 – 1	3 – 1	3 – 2	1 – 3	2 – 3	5 – 3
70	3	(Netherlands) Michael van Gerwen	4 – 1	Max Hopp (Germany)	3 – 0	3 – 1	3 – 0	0 – 3	3 – 2	—N/a	—N/a

Sunday, 23 December

Game #	Round	Player 1	Score	Player 2	Set 1	Set 2	Set 3	Set 4	Set 5	Set 6	Set 7
71	3	(Netherlands) Vincent van der Voort	3 – 4	Chris Dobey (England)	1 – 3	3 – 2	0 – 3	3 – 2	3 – 0	0 – 3	1 – 3
72	3	(Northern Ireland) Brendan Dolan	4 – 2	Mervyn King (England)	3 – 1	3 – 2	2 – 3	1 – 3	3 – 2	3 – 2	—N/a
73	3	(England) James Wade	4 – 3	Keegan Brown (England)	2 – 3	2 – 3	3 – 1	0 – 3	3 – 0	3 – 2	3 – 1
74	3	(England) Adrian Lewis	4 – 0	Darius Labanauskas (Lithuania)	3 – 0	3 – 1	3 – 1	3 – 1	—N/a	—N/a	—N/a
75	3	(England) Nathan Aspinall	4 – 1	Kyle Anderson (Australia)	3 – 2	3 – 1	1 – 3	3 – 1	3 – 2	—N/a	—N/a
76	3	(England) Rob Cross	4 – 0	Cristo Reyes (Spain)	3 – 1	3 – 0	3 – 2	3 – 2	—N/a	—N/a	—N/a

Thursday, 27 December

Game #	Round	Player 1	Score	Player 2	Set 1	Set 2	Set 3	Set 4	Set 5	Set 6	Set 7
77	3	(South Africa) Devon Petersen	4 – 2	Steve West (England)	0 – 3	3 – 1	3 – 0	0 – 3	3 – 2	3 – 1	—N/a
78	3	(Belgium) Dimitri Van den Bergh	1 – 4	Luke Humphries (England)	2 – 3	2 – 3	3 – 1	1 – 3	0 – 3	—N/a	—N/a
79	3	(England) Michael Smith	4 – 2	John Henderson (Scotland)	2 – 3	3 – 2	2 – 3	3 – 0	3 – 1	3 – 0	—N/a
80	3	(Spain) Toni Alcinas	2 – 4	Benito van de Pas (Netherlands)	1 – 3	1 – 3	3 – 2	3 – 2	2 – 3	2 – 3	—N/a
81	4	(Scotland) Gary Anderson	4 – 3	Chris Dobey (England)	2 – 3	1 – 3	3 – 0	3 – 2	2 – 3	3 – 2	4 – 2
82	4	(Netherlands) Michael van Gerwen	4 – 1	Adrian Lewis (England)	3 – 1	3 – 2	2 – 3	3 – 2	3 – 2	—N/a	—N/a

Friday, 28 December

Game #	Round	Player 1	Score	Player 2	Set 1	Set 2	Set 3	Set 4	Set 5	Set 6	Set 7
83	4	(England) Nathan Aspinall	4 – 3	Devon Petersen (South Africa)	1 – 3	0 – 3	3 – 2	3 – 1	3 – 2	1 – 3	4 – 2
84	4	(Netherlands) Benito van de Pas	1 – 4	Brendan Dolan (Northern Ireland)	1 – 3	1 – 3	0 – 3	3 – 2	2 – 3	—N/a	—N/a
85	4	(England) Ryan Joyce	4 – 3	James Wade (England)	3 – 1	2 – 3	1 – 3	3 – 0	0 – 3	3 – 2	3 – 1
86	4	(England) Ryan Searle	1 – 4	Michael Smith (England)	1 – 3	2 – 3	0 – 3	3 – 2	2 – 3	—N/a	—N/a
87	4	(Wales) Jamie Lewis	0 – 4	Dave Chisnall (England)	2 – 3	1 – 3	2 – 3	1 – 3	—N/a	—N/a	—N/a
88	4	(England) Rob Cross	2 – 4	Luke Humphries (England)	3 – 0	3 – 2	1 – 3	1 – 3	1 – 3	2 – 3	—N/a

Saturday, 29 December

Game #	Round	Player 1	Score	Player 2	Set 1	Set 2	Set 3	Set 4	Set 5	Set 6	Set 7	Set 8	Set 9
89	QF	(England) Nathan Aspinall	5 – 1	Brendan Dolan (Northern Ireland)	3 – 0	3 – 2	3 – 1	3 – 1	0 – 3	3 – 1	—N/a	—N/a	—N/a
90	QF	(England) Dave Chisnall	2 – 5	Gary Anderson (Scotland)	0 – 3	1 – 3	2 – 3	3 – 2	1 – 3	3 – 2	2 – 3	—N/a	—N/a
91	QF	(England) Luke Humphries	1 – 5	Michael Smith (England)	1 – 3	0 – 3	3 – 0	1 – 3	2 – 3	1 – 3	—N/a	—N/a	—N/a
92	QF	(Netherlands) Michael van Gerwen	5 – 1	Ryan Joyce (England)	3 – 0	3 – 1	2 – 3	3 – 2	3 – 1	3 – 1	—N/a	—N/a	—N/a

Sunday, 30 December

Game #	Round	Player 1	Score	Player 2	Set 1	Set 2	Set 3	Set 4	Set 5	Set 6	Set 7	Set 8	Set 9	Set 10	Set 11
93	SF	(England) Michael Smith	6 – 3	Nathan Aspinall (England)	3 – 0	3 – 0	2 – 3	1 – 3	3 – 2	2 – 3	3 – 1	3 – 1	3 – 0	—N/a	—N/a
94	SF	(Netherlands) Michael van Gerwen	6 – 1	Gary Anderson (Scotland)	3 – 2	3 – 0	3 – 0	3 – 1	3 – 0	2 – 3	3 – 1	—N/a	—N/a	—N/a	—N/a

Tuesday, 1 January

Game #	Round	Player 1	Score	Player 2	Set 1	Set 2	Set 3	Set 4	Set 5	Set 6	Set 7	Set 8	Set 9	Set 10	Set 11	Set 12	Set 13
95	F	(Netherlands) Michael van Gerwen	7 – 3	Michael Smith (England)	3 – 2	3 – 1	3 – 1	3 – 2	2 – 3	0 – 3	3 – 1	3 – 2	2 – 3	3 – 1	—N/a	—N/a	—N/a

== Draw ==
=== Finals ===
Quarter-finals (best of 9 sets); 29 December
1	(Netherlands) Michael van Gerwen 101.12	5
(England) Ryan Joyce 88.35	1
12	(England) Dave Chisnall 96.54	2
4	(Scotland) Gary Anderson 103.03	5
(England) Luke Humphries 94.18	1
10	(England) Michael Smith 103.00	5
(England) Nathan Aspinall 99.72	5
(Northern Ireland) Brendan Dolan 93.87	1

Semi-finals (best of 11 sets); 30 December
1	(Netherlands) Michael van Gerwen 104.76	6
4	(Scotland) Gary Anderson 97.98	1
10	(England) Michael Smith 105.22	6
(England) Nathan Aspinall 100.53	3

Final (best of 13 sets); 1 January
1	(Netherlands) Michael van Gerwen 102.21	7
10	(England) Michael Smith 95.29	3

=== Top half ===
==== Section 1 ====
First round (best of 5 sets); 13–19 December
(England) Alan Tabern 91.12	3
(Australia) Raymond Smith 86.14	2
(Netherlands) Danny Noppert 96.19	3
(Hong Kong) Royden Lam 85.72	0
(England) Simon Stevenson 93.96	0
(England) Ted Evetts 92.97	3
(England) Matthew Edgar 83.41	1
(Lithuania) Darius Labanauskas 93.57	3
(England) Ryan Joyce 90.34	3
(Russia) Anastasia Dobromyslova 77.32	0
(Republic of Ireland) Steve Lennon 87.22	3
(Australia) James Bailey 80.18	0
(Poland) Krzysztof Ratajski 90.21	2
(Japan) Seigo Asada 90.64	3
(England) Keegan Brown 95.78	3
(Czech Republic) Karel Sedláček 92.15	0

Second round (best of 5 sets); 13–21 December
1	(Netherlands) Michael van Gerwen 102.59	3
(England) Alan Tabern 93.45	1
32	(Germany) Max Hopp 93.51	3
(Netherlands) Danny Noppert 97.35	0
16	(England) Adrian Lewis 97.20	3
(England) Ted Evetts 95.92	0
17	(Netherlands) Raymond van Barneveld 89.57	2
(Lithuania) Darius Labanauskas 86.81	3
8	(Australia) Simon Whitlock 87.63	0
(England) Ryan Joyce 90.40	3
25	(England) Alan Norris 92.23	3
(Republic of Ireland) Steve Lennon 87.89	2
9	(England) James Wade 93.57	3
(Japan) Seigo Asada 97.50	2
24	(Netherlands) Jelle Klaasen 79.24	1
(England) Keegan Brown 82.55	3

Third round (best of 7 sets); 22–27 December
1	(Netherlands) Michael van Gerwen 101.51	4
32	(Germany) Max Hopp 96.68	1
16	(England) Adrian Lewis 97.43	4
(Lithuania) Darius Labanauskas 89.74	0
(England) Ryan Joyce 87.74	4
25	(England) Alan Norris 89.65	3
9	(England) James Wade 94.71	4
(England) Keegan Brown 91.01	3

Fourth round (best of 7 sets); 27–28 December
1	(Netherlands) Michael van Gerwen 108.08	4
16	(England) Adrian Lewis 101.16	1
(England) Ryan Joyce 87.69	4
9	(England) James Wade 90.77	3

Quarter-finals (best of 9 sets); 29 December
1	(Netherlands) Michael van Gerwen 101.12	5
(England) Ryan Joyce 88.35	1

==== Section 2 ====
First round (best of 5 sets); 13–19 December
(England) Ross Smith 91.89	3
(Singapore) Paul Lim 91.28	1
(Germany) Martin Schindler 85.18	2
(New Zealand) Cody Harris 88.66	3
(England) Josh Payne 87.34	3
(Canada) Jeff Smith 88.98	2
(Scotland) Robert Thornton 87.15	1
(Sweden) Daniel Larsson 91.03	3
(Australia) Paul Nicholson 85.03	0
(Northern Ireland) Kevin Burness 88.55	3
(England) Michael Barnard 88.08	3
(Portugal) José de Sousa 87.83	2
(Netherlands) Vincent van der Voort 94.06	3
(Philippines) Lourence Ilagan 95.52	1
(England) Chris Dobey 92.56	3
(Russia) Boris Koltsov 79.19	0

Second round (best of 5 sets); 13–21 December
5	(Northern Ireland) Daryl Gurney 100.30	3
(England) Ross Smith 88.69	0
28	(Wales) Jamie Lewis 92.32	3
(New Zealand) Cody Harris 92.52	2
12	(England) Dave Chisnall 95.58	3
(England) Josh Payne 98.49	2
21	(Belgium) Kim Huybrechts 103.26	3
(Sweden) Daniel Larsson 91.26	0
4	(Scotland) Gary Anderson 94.92	3
(Northern Ireland) Kevin Burness 92.35	1
29	(Netherlands) Jermaine Wattimena 89.94	3
(England) Michael Barnard 83.34	0
13	(England) Darren Webster 85.48	0
(Netherlands) Vincent van der Voort 87.81	3
20	(England) Steve Beaton 89.27	0
(England) Chris Dobey 93.44	3

Third round (best of 7 sets); 22–27 December
5	(Northern Ireland) Daryl Gurney 91.08	3
28	(Wales) Jamie Lewis 93.94	4
12	(England) Dave Chisnall 97.60	4
21	(Belgium) Kim Huybrechts 89.84	0
4	(Scotland) Gary Anderson 97.33	4
29	(Netherlands) Jermaine Wattimena 95.19	3
(Netherlands) Vincent van der Voort 93.43	3
(England) Chris Dobey 98.39	4

Fourth round (best of 7 sets); 27–28 December
28	(Wales) Jamie Lewis 93.75	0
12	(England) Dave Chisnall 98.50	4
4	(Scotland) Gary Anderson 98.75	4
(England) Chris Dobey 100.83	3

Quarter-finals (best of 9 sets); 29 December
12	(England) Dave Chisnall 96.54	2
4	(Scotland) Gary Anderson 103.03	5

=== Bottom half ===
==== Section 3 ====
First round (best of 5 sets); 13–19 December
(Netherlands) Jeffrey de Zwaan 91.18	3
(India) Nitin Kumar 77.75	0
(England) Ricky Evans 90.74	1
(Austria) Rowby-John Rodriguez 89.30	3
(Belgium) Dimitri Van den Bergh 85.25	3
(United States) Chuck Puleo 83.34	0
(England) Luke Humphries 97.58	3
(England) Adam Hunt 81.40	0
(England) Ryan Searle 87.82	3
(England) Stephen Burton 87.06	0
(Republic of Ireland) William O'Connor 87.12	3
(Netherlands) Yordi Meeuwisse 84.30	0
(Netherlands) Ron Meulenkamp 93.56	3
(Brazil) Diogo Portela 92.12	2
(Germany) Gabriel Clemens 83.27	3
(England) Aden Kirk 80.31	0

Second round (best of 5 sets); 13–21 December
2	(England) Rob Cross 102.93	3
(Netherlands) Jeffrey de Zwaan 106.09	1
31	(Spain) Cristo Reyes 89.30	3
(Austria) Rowby-John Rodriguez 85.28	2
15	(Wales) Jonny Clayton 92.68	1
(Belgium) Dimitri Van den Bergh 104.45	3
18	(England) Stephen Bunting 88.21	1
(England) Luke Humphries 95.56	3
7	(Austria) Mensur Suljović 90.83	1
(England) Ryan Searle 90.66	3
26	(England) James Wilson 93.80	2
(Republic of Ireland) William O'Connor 98.73	3
10	(England) Michael Smith 94.07	3
(Netherlands) Ron Meulenkamp 93.81	1
23	(Scotland) John Henderson 95.17	3
(Germany) Gabriel Clemens 93.89	2

Third round (best of 7 sets); 22–27 December
2	(England) Rob Cross 101.72	4
31	(Spain) Cristo Reyes 96.20	0
(Belgium) Dimitri Van den Bergh 90.82	1
(England) Luke Humphries 89.64	4
(England) Ryan Searle 89.40	4
(Republic of Ireland) William O'Connor 89.76	1
10	(England) Michael Smith 100.47	4
23	(Scotland) John Henderson 94.65	2

Fourth round (best of 7 sets); 27–28 December
2	(England) Rob Cross 97.38	2
(England) Luke Humphries 99.71	4
(England) Ryan Searle 96.22	1
10	(England) Michael Smith 99.72	4

Quarter-finals (best of 9 sets); 29 December
(England) Luke Humphries 94.18	1
10	(England) Michael Smith 103.00	5

==== Section 4 ====
First round (best of 5 sets); 13–19 December
(England) Nathan Aspinall 88.42	3
(Netherlands) Geert Nentjes 78.03	0
(Netherlands) Jeffrey de Graaf 78.52	2
(Philippines) Noel Malicdem 85.86	3
(England) Wayne Jones 83.66	2
(South Africa) Devon Petersen 84.79	3
(England) Richard North 92.82	3
(Germany) Robert Marijanović 85.99	2
(Spain) Toni Alcinas 86.03	3
(New Zealand) Craig Ross 71.47	0
(Northern Ireland) Mickey Mansell 75.22	1
(Canada) Jim Long 75.33	3
(Northern Ireland) Brendan Dolan 86.63	3
(China) Yuanjun Liu 78.45	0
(Netherlands) Jan Dekker 88.95	3
(England) Lisa Ashton 88.56	1

Second round (best of 5 sets); 13–21 December
6	(Wales) Gerwyn Price 89.08	2
(England) Nathan Aspinall 92.28	3
27	(Australia) Kyle Anderson 96.41	3
(Philippines) Noel Malicdem 92.93	1
11	(England) Ian White 98.66	2
(South Africa) Devon Petersen 94.68	3
22	(England) Steve West 89.49	3
(England) Richard North 95.96	1
3	(Scotland) Peter Wright 94.70	1
(Spain) Toni Alcinas 93.12	3
30	(Netherlands) Benito van de Pas 86.62	3
(Canada) Jim Long 85.71	2
14	(England) Joe Cullen 85.16	0
(Northern Ireland) Brendan Dolan 92.72	3
19	(England) Mervyn King 97.76	3
(Netherlands) Jan Dekker 87.56	2

Third round (best of 7 sets); 22–27 December
(England) Nathan Aspinall 96.17	4
27	(Australia) Kyle Anderson 98.52	1
(South Africa) Devon Petersen 92.25	4
22	(England) Steve West 95.68	2
(Spain) Toni Alcinas 84.53	2
30	(Netherlands) Benito van de Pas 85.61	4
(Northern Ireland) Brendan Dolan 95.73	4
19	(England) Mervyn King 92.22	2

Fourth round (best of 7 sets); 27–28 December
(England) Nathan Aspinall 95.76	4
(South Africa) Devon Petersen 90.75	3
30	(Netherlands) Benito van de Pas 86.67	1
(Northern Ireland) Brendan Dolan 89.77	4

Quarter-finals (best of 9 sets); 29 December
(England) Nathan Aspinall 99.72	5
(Northern Ireland) Brendan Dolan 93.87	1

== Final ==
Final: Best of 13 sets. Referees: Kirk Bevins (first half) and George Noble (second half). Alexandra Palace, London, England, 1 January 2019.
(1) Michael van Gerwen (Netherlands)	7 – 3	(England) Michael Smith (10)
3 – 2, 3 – 1, 3 – 1, 3 – 2, 2 – 3, 0 – 3, 3 – 1, 3 – 2, 2 – 3, 3 – 1
102.21	Average (3 darts)	95.29
49	100+ scores	45
25	140+ scores	27
14	180 scores	13
129	Highest checkout	127
3	100+ Checkouts	3
46.30% (25/54)	Checkout summary	40.43% (19/47)

== Top averages ==
This table shows the highest averages achieved by players throughout the tournament.

#	Player	Round	Average	Result
1	(Netherlands) Michael van Gerwen	R4	108.08	Won
2	(Netherlands) Jeffrey de Zwaan	R2	106.09	Lost
3	(England) Michael Smith	SF	105.22	Won
4	(Netherlands) Michael van Gerwen	SF	104.76	Won
5	(Belgium) Dimitri Van den Bergh	R2	104.45	Won
6	(Belgium) Kim Huybrechts	R2	103.26	Won
7	(Scotland) Gary Anderson	QF	103.03	Won
8	(England) Michael Smith	QF	103.00	Won
9	(England) Rob Cross	R2	102.93	Won
10	(Netherlands) Michael van Gerwen	R2	102.59	Won

== Representation ==
This table shows the number of players by country in the 2019 PDC World Championship. A total of 28 nationalities were represented, the most ever at a darts world championship. The second round sees an increase in participation for some countries due to the first round bye for the 32 highest ranked players.

	(England) ENG	(Netherlands) NED	(Australia) AUS	(Scotland) SCO	(Northern Ireland) NIR	(Germany) GER	(Wales) WAL	(Belgium) BEL	(Republic of Ireland) IRL	(Spain) SPA	(Austria) AUT	(Canada) CAN	(New Zealand) NZL	(Philippines) PHI	(Russia) RUS	(South Africa) RSA	(Lithuania) LIT	(Japan) JPN	(Sweden) SWE	(Brazil) BRA	(China) CHN	(Czech Republic) CZE	(Hong Kong) HKG	(India) IND	(Poland) POL	(Portugal) POR	(Singapore) SIN	(United States) USA	Total
Final	1	1	0	0	0	0	0	0	0	0	0	0	0	0	0	0	0	0	0	0	0	0	0	0	0	0	0	0	2
Semi-final	2	1	0	1	0	0	0	0	0	0	0	0	0	0	0	0	0	0	0	0	0	0	0	0	0	0	0	0	4
Quarter-final	5	1	0	1	1	0	0	0	0	0	0	0	0	0	0	0	0	0	0	0	0	0	0	0	0	0	0	0	8
Round 4	10	2	0	1	1	0	1	0	0	0	0	0	0	0	0	1	0	0	0	0	0	0	0	0	0	0	0	0	16
Round 3	14	4	1	2	2	1	1	2	1	2	0	0	0	0	0	1	1	0	0	0	0	0	0	0	0	0	0	0	32
Round 2	26	10	2	3	3	2	3	2	2	2	2	1	1	1	0	1	1	1	1	0	0	0	0	0	0	0	0	0	64
Round 1	20	8	3	1	3	3	0	1	2	1	1	2	2	2	2	1	1	1	1	1	1	1	1	1	1	1	1	1	64
Total	34	13	5	4	4	4	3	2	2	2	2	2	2	2	2	1	1	1	1	1	1	1	1	1	1	1	1	1	96
