= Aden Kirk =

English darts player and children's book author (born 1992)

Personal information
- Nickname: "Captain"
- Born: 3 March 1992 (age 34) Nottingham, England
- Home town: Ilkeston, Derbyshire, England

Sport
- Sport: Darts
- Playing since: 2006
- Darts: 23g Winmau Signature
- Laterality: Right-handed
- Walk-on music: "You Make My Dreams" by Daryl Hall & John Oates

Organisation (see split in darts)
- PDC: 2010–present
- Current world ranking: (PDC) 161 ▼1 (18 October 2026)

PDC premier events – best performances
- World Championship: Last 96: 2019
- UK Open: Last 16: 2014

Other tournament wins
- Years
PDC Development Tour	2015, 2016
PDC Challenge Tour	2024

Aden Kirk (born 3 March 1992) is an English professional darts player who competes in Professional Darts Corporation (PDC) events. He is also a published children's book author with Austin Macauley Publishers. Kirk is most known for his third round victory over Phil Taylor at the 2014 UK Open, regarded as one of the biggest shocks in darts history.

== Career ==
In 2014, Kirk reached the last 64 in two of the six UK Open qualifiers to enter the event in the first round stage. He beat Conan Whitehead 5–4 and Gerwyn Price 5–2 to face 16-time world champion Phil Taylor in the third round. In Kirk's first televised match, he caused a big upset by beating Taylor 9–7. He then played Peter Wright, who had been the World Championship runner-up at the beginning of the year, and continued his amazing run by taking out two ton-plus finishes and coming back from 5–3 down to triumph 9–5. In the fifth round Kirk and Brendan Dolan shared the first 14 legs, before the Northern Irishman won the match with two 13 dart legs. Kirk earned £5,000 for his run in the tournament, by far the biggest of his career to date. In July, Kirk reached the final of the 12th Challenge Tour event of the year where he was edged out 5–4 by Brett Claydon.

In April 2015, Kirk won the third Development Tour event of the year. He saw off Jamie Lewis 4–3 in the semi-finals and Benito van de Pas 4–1 in the final. Kirk reached the last 16 of a PDC event for the first time since his UK Open exploits at the 15th Players Championship with victories over William O'Connor, Justin Pipe and Ronny Huybrechts, before he lost 6–1 to Peter Wright.

Kirk won 2016's 11th Development Tour event by beating Keegan Brown 4−3 in the final. He also reached the final of the 16th event and lost 4−1 to Dean Reynolds. He finished third on the Order of Merit, but won a two-year Tour Card after first placed Reynolds decided to remain in the BDO.

== World Championship results ==
=== PDC ===
- 2019: 1st round (lost to Gabriel Clemens 0–3)

== Performance timeline ==
=== PDC Players Championships ===
Season	1	2	3	4	5	6	7	8	9	10	11	12	13	14	15	16	17	18	19	20	21	22	23	24	25	26	27	28	29	30	31	32	33	34
2014	Did not participate					WIG; 2R	WIG; DNP	WIG; 2R	CRA; 1R	CRA; 2R	COV; DNP	COV; 1R	CRA; 2R	CRA; 1R	DUB; 2R	DUB; 3R	CRA; 1R	CRA; 1R	COV; DNP															
2015	Did not participate								CRA; 1R	CRA; 3R	BAR; 1R	BAR; 1R	WIG; DNP		BAR; 4R	BAR; 2R	Did not participate																	
2016	Did not participate										BAR; 1R	Did not participate																						
2017	BAR; 3R	BAR; 2R	BAR; 1R	BAR; 1R	MIL; 2R	MIL; 1R	BAR; 3R	BAR; 1R	WIG; 2R	WIG; 1R	MIL; 2R	MIL; 2R	WIG; 1R	WIG; 1R	BAR; 2R	BAR; 2R	BAR; 2R	BAR; 2R	DUB; 1R	DUB; 1R	BAR; 1R	BAR; 2R												
2018	BAR; 1R	BAR; DNP	BAR; 1R	BAR; 1R	MIL; 1R	MIL; 2R	BAR; 1R	BAR; 2R	WIG; 3R	WIG; 1R	MIL; 1R	MIL; 1R	WIG; 1R	WIG; 1R	BAR; 2R	BAR; 3R	BAR; 1R	BAR; 1R	DUB; 2R	DUB; 1R	BAR; 1R	BAR; 1R												
2024	WIG; 1R	WIG; 1R	LEI; 1R	LEI; 1R	HIL; DNP		LEI; 1R	LEI; 2R	Did not participate				MIL; 1R	MIL; DNP	MIL; 2R	MIL; 1R	MIL; 1R	Did not participate				LEI; 1R	LEI; 1R	Did not participate										
2025	WIG; DNP		ROS; 2R	ROS; 2R	Did not participate																													
2026	Did not participate								WIG; 1R	WIG; 1R	MIL; 1R	MIL; 1R	Did not participate						MIL; 2R	MIL; 1R	WIG; 2R	WIG; 1R	LEI; 1R	LEI; 2R	Did not participate						ROS	ROS	LEI	LEI
