= Kevin Burness =

Northern Irish darts player

Personal information
- Nickname: "Iron Man"
- Born: 17 November 1965 (age 60) Newtownards, Northern Ireland

Sport
- Sport: Darts
- Playing since: 2006
- Darts: 24 Gram Cosmo Signature
- Laterality: Right-handed
- Walk-on music: "Penny Arcade" by Roy Orbison

Organisation (see split in darts)
- BDO: 2008–2018
- PDC: 2018–
- Current world ranking: (PDC) NR (18 October 2026)

WDF major events – best performances
- World Masters: Last 80: 2012, 2013, 2014, 2015

PDC premier events – best performances
- World Championship: Last 64: 2019
- UK Open: Last 128: 2019, 2023

Other tournament wins
- Years
Tom Kirby Memorial Irish Matchplay	2018
MODUS Online Darts League 4, 5	2021
Phase three MODUS Online darts League 3	2021

Kevin Burness (born 17 November 1965) is a Northern Irish professional darts player who competes in Professional Darts Corporation (PDC) events.

== Career ==
Burness entered UK Q-School in 2018, winning a two-year Tour Card, by finishing in the top 15 on the Order of Merit, after the four days of Q-School were completed.

Burness won the 2018 Tom Kirby Memorial Irish Matchplay to qualify for the 2019 PDC World Darts Championship, beating Mick McGowan 6–3.

He beat Paul Nicholson 3–0 in the first round of the 2019 PDC World Darts Championship. In the second round against Gary Anderson he was defeated 3–1.

Burness made his PDC European Tour debut in the 2019 Danish Darts Open. He lost 6–1 in the second round against Joe Cullen. He lost his Tour card after the 2019 season, when he finished 83rd on the PDC Order of Merit.

In January 2022 Burness regained his Tour card via PDC UK Q-School Order of Merit, returning to the circuit for two more years.

He lost his tour card again after finishing 120th on the PDC Order of Merit after the 2023 season.

== World Championship results ==
=== PDC ===
- 2019: Second round (lost to Gary Anderson 1–3) (sets)
- 2020: First round (lost to Jelle Klaasen 1–3)

== Performance timeline ==
BDO

Tournament	2007	2011	2012	2013	2014	2015	2016	2017
World Masters	1R	1R	3R	3R	3R	3R	1R	1R

PDC

Tournament	2019	2020	2022	2023	2024
PDC World Championship	2R	1R	DNQ		
UK Open	2R	1R	1R	2R	1R
Career statistics
Season-end ranking	83	-	137	120	

PDC European Tour

Season	1	2	3	4	5	6	7	8	9	10	11	12	13
2019	Did not qualify							DDO; 2R	Did not qualify				
2022	DNQ				EDO; 1R	CDO; DNQ	EDG; DNQ	DDC; 1R	Did not qualify				

PDC Players Championships

Season	1	2	3	4	5	6	7	8	9	10	11	12	13	14	15	16	17	18	19	20	21	22	23	24	25	26	27	28	29	30	31	32	33	34
2018	BAR; DNP		BAR; 1R	BAR; 1R	MIL; 1R	MIL; 1R	BAR; 2R	BAR; 2R	WIG; 1R	WIG; 2R	MIL; 1R	MIL; 1R	WIG; 1R	WIG; 1R	BAR; 1R	BAR; 2R	BAR; 2R	BAR; 2R	DUB; 1R	DUB; 1R	BAR; 1R	BAR; 1R												
2022	BAR; 1R	BAR; 1R	WIG; 1R	WIG; 1R	BAR; 1R	BAR; 2R	NIE; 1R	NIE; 1R	BAR; 3R	BAR; 2R	BAR; 3R	BAR; 1R	BAR; 1R	WIG; 1R	WIG; 1R	NIE; 1R	NIE; 1R	BAR; 1R	BAR; 1R	BAR; 3R	BAR; 1R	BAR; 1R	BAR; 2R	BAR; 2R	BAR; 1R	BAR; 2R	BAR; 1R	BAR; 2R	BAR; 1R	BAR; 1R				
2025	WIG; 2R	WIG; 3R	ROS; 2R	ROS; 1R	LEI; DNP		HIL; 1R	HIL; 1R	LEI; DNP	LEI; 4R	LEI; 1R	LEI; 1R	ROS; 1R	ROS; 2R	HIL; 1R	HIL; 1R	LEI; DNP			LEI; 1R	LEI; 1R	HIL; 4R	HIL; 1R	Did not participate										

Performance Table Legend
W	Won the tournament	F	Finalist	SF	Semifinalist	QF	Quarterfinalist	#R; RR; L#	Lost in # round Round-robin; Last # stage	DQ	Disqualified
DNQ	Did not qualify	DNP	Did not participate	WD	Withdrew	NH	Tournament not held	#R; RR; L#	Lost in # round Round-robin; Last # stage	NYF	Not yet founded
