= Diogo Portela =

Brazilian darts player

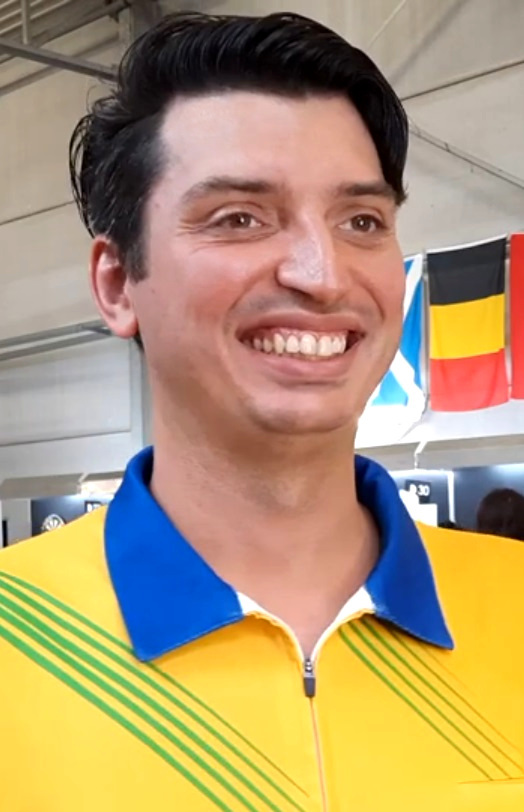
- Portela in 2022

Personal information
- Nickname: "Braziliant"
- Born: 12 June 1988 (age 38) Rio de Janeiro, Brazil
- Home town: Richmond, London, England

Sport
- Sport: Darts
- Playing since: 2012
- Darts: 25g
- Laterality: Right-handed
- Walk-on music: "Mas que Nada" by Sérgio Mendes

Organisation (see split in darts)
- BDO: 2013–2014
- PDC: 2015–
- WDF: 2013–2014, 2022–
- Current world ranking: (WDF) NR (17 August 2026)

PDC premier events – best performances
- World Championship: Last 64: 2018, 2021
- UK Open: Last 128: 2019

Other tournament wins
- Years
PDC Challenge Tour	2018
PDC South American Qualifier	2021, 2022
UK Open Qualifier	2022

Diogo Portela (born 12 June 1988) is a Brazilian professional darts player who competes in Professional Darts Corporation (PDC) and World Darts Federation (WDF) events.

== Career ==
Originally from Rio de Janeiro, Portela first came into prominence in 2015 when he appeared on the Sky1 darts show One Hundred and Eighty, where with the help of James Wade, he won £16,000.

His first foray into professional darts was when he tried to win a PDC Tour Card in 2017, but while he failed to do so, he did some other firsts, such as becoming the first Brazilian to win a PDC European Tour match when he defeated Martin Schindler in the first round of the German Darts Championship.

In June 2017, he and Alexandre Sattin became the first pair to represent Brazil in the World Cup of Darts in Frankfurt, Germany. They defeated Switzerland 5–4 in a last-leg decider, before losing to the host nation pair of Max Hopp and Martin Schindler, with Portela winning their only leg in the two matches. The following year, he and Bruno Rangel would represent Brazil in the 2018 PDC World Cup of Darts, and after breezing past Denmark in round 1, they would lose to the Scotland pairing of Peter Wright and Gary Anderson.

He would qualify for the 2018 and 2019 PDC World Darts Championships by winning the South American qualifier. In 2018, he lost to the number 2 seed Peter Wright, and in 2019, he lost 3–2 to Ron Meulenkamp after being 2–0 up.

Portela did not get Tour card in any Q-school in 2018, 2019 or 2020 and continued playing mainly on PDC Challenge Tour or some BDO tournaments. Occasionally he appeared in some PDPA Players Championship events. He represented Brazil in the 2019 PDC World Cup of Darts, but lost with his partner, Artur Valle, to Sweden 1–5. In October 2019 he made into the semifinal of Northern Ireland Open. After winning yet another South American qualifier, he secured his sport for the third PDC World Darts Championship in a row. This time he did not win a set and lost in the first round against Josh Payne 0–3.

He qualified for the 2021 World Championship and defeated Steve Beaton 3–0 to advance to the 2nd round for the first time in his career, before losing to Glen Durrant.

== World Championship results ==
=== PDC ===
- 2018: First round (lost to Peter Wright 1–3)
- 2019: First round (lost to Ron Meulenkamp 2–3)
- 2020: First round (lost to Josh Payne 0–3)
- 2021: Second round (lost to Glen Durrant 0–3)
- 2022: First round (lost to Alan Soutar 2–3)
- 2023: First round (lost to Cameron Menzies 1–3)

== Performance timeline ==
Diego Portela's performance timeline is as follows:

PDC

Tournament	2017	2018	2019	2020	2021	2022	2023
PDC World Championship	DNP	1R	1R	1R	2R	1R	1R
UK Open	DNQ		2R	DNQ		1R	
Non-ranked televised events
PDC World Cup of Darts	2R	2R	1R	1R	1R	1R	

Key

Performance Table Legend
W	Won the tournament	F	Finalist	SF	Semifinalist	QF	Quarterfinalist	#R; RR; L#	Lost in # round Round-robin; Last # stage	DQ	Disqualified
DNQ	Did not qualify	DNP	Did not participate	WD	Withdrew	NH	Tournament not held	#R; RR; L#	Lost in # round Round-robin; Last # stage	NYF	Not yet founded
