= Craig Ross (darts player) =

New Zealand darts player

Personal information
- Nickname: "The Rock"
- Born: 5 October 1970 (age 56) Ashburton, New Zealand

Sport
- Sport: Darts
- Playing since: 1999
- Darts: 21g Shot Darts
- Laterality: Right-handed
- Walk-on music: "We Will Rock You" by Queen

Organisation (see split in darts)
- BDO: 2008–2018
- PDC: 2018–2024

PDC premier events – best performances
- World Championship: Last 96: 2019

Other tournament wins
- Years
Alan King Memorial	2009

Craig Ross (born 5 October 1970) is a New Zealand former professional darts player who has competes in the Professional Darts Corporation (PDC) events. His nickname is The Rock.

== Career ==
He qualified for the 2019 PDC World Darts Championship, replacing Tahuna Irwin, who had beaten him in the DPNZ Qualifier, but was unable to travel to the UK, owing to visa problems. Ross played Toni Alcinas of Spain in the first round, but only won one leg, and was easily defeated 3–0. He won £7500 from this competition.

== World Championship results ==
=== PDC ===
- 2019: First round: (lost to Toni Alcinas 0–3) (sets)
