= Nitin Kumar =

Indian darts player (born 1985)

Personal information
- Full name: Nitin Sharda Kumar
- Nickname: "The Royal Bengal"
- Born: 14 November 1985 (age 41) Chennai, India
- Home town: Coimbatore, India; Dubai, United Arab Emirates

Sport
- Sport: Darts
- Playing since: 1995
- Darts: 23g Winmau Signature
- Laterality: Right-handed
- Walk-on music: "Mundian To Bach Ke" by Panjabi MC

Organisation (see split in darts)
- BDO: 2006, 2011–2020
- PDC: 2015, 2018–

PDC premier events – best performances
- World Championship: Last 64: 2026

Other tournament wins
- Years
PDC Asian Tour	2023
Mongolian Open	2024

Nitin Sharda Kumar (born 14 November 1985) is an Indian professional darts player who competes in Professional Darts Corporation (PDC) events. He became the first Indian player to win a match at a darts world championship at the 2026 PDC edition, beating Richard Veenstra on 14 December 2025.

== Career ==
In 2011, Kumar represented Team India at the 2011 WDF World Cup along with Amit Gilitwala, Sarthak Patel, Chandrika Singh and Phalgun Tiruvasu.

In 2014, Kumar represented India at the 2014 PDC World Cup of Darts along with Amit Gilitwala, where they lost 5–0 in the first round to the Belgian pair of Kim Huybrechts and Ronny Huybrechts.

In 2015, Kumar represented India at the 2015 PDC World Cup of Darts along with Ashfaque Sayed, where they lost 5–0 in the first round to the German pair of Jyhan Artut and Max Hopp.

In 2018, Kumar won the Indian Qualifier for the 2019 PDC World Darts Championship, beating Ankit Goenka 5–0 in the final. In his First Round match with Jeffrey de Zwaan he could win three legs before losing 3–0.

In 2019, Kumar won the Indian Qualifier for the 2020 PDC World Darts Championship, beating Ravi Bhat 6–1 in the final.

In 2021, Kumar won the Indian Qualifier for the 2022 PDC World Darts Championship, beating Vikehelie Suohu 6–0 in the final to secure a third appearance in four years.

In 2024, Kumar once again won the Indian Qualifier for the 2025 PDC World Darts Championship. He was able to win his first set at a PDC World Championship, but lost to Martin Lukeman 3–1.

In the 2026 PDC World Darts Championship, Kumar defeated Richard Veenstra 3–2 in the first round but lost to Stephen Bunting in the second round.

== World Championship results ==
=== PDC ===
- 2019: First round (lost to Jeffrey de Zwaan 0–3)
- 2020: First round (lost to Brendan Dolan 0–3)
- 2022: First round (lost to Ricky Evans 0–3)
- 2025: First round (lost to Martin Lukeman 1–3)
- 2026: Second round (lost to Stephen Bunting 0–3)

== Performance timeline ==
PDC

Tournament	2015	2016–2018	2019	2020	2021	2022	2023–2024	2025	2026
PDC Ranked televised events
PDC World Championship	DNP		1R	1R	DNP	1R	DNP	1R	2R
PDC Non-ranked televised events
PDC World Cup of Darts	1R	DNP						RR	RR

Performance Table Legend
W	Won the tournament	F	Finalist	SF	Semifinalist	QF	Quarterfinalist	#R; RR; Prel.	Lost in # round Round-robin; Preliminary round	DQ	Disqualified
DNQ	Did not qualify	DNP	Did not participate	WD	Withdrew	NH	Tournament not held	#R; RR; Prel.	Lost in # round Round-robin; Preliminary round	NYF	Not yet founded
