= Christian Bunse =

German darts player (born 1995)

Personal information
- Born: January 6, 1995 (age 31) Paderborn, Germany
- Home town: Diemelsee, Germany

Sport
- Sport: Darts
- Playing since: 2015
- Darts: 24 Gram
- Laterality: Right-handed
- Walk-on music: "Start Me Up" by The Rolling Stones

Organisation (see split in darts)
- PDC: 2017–2021

PDC premier events – best performances
- UK Open: Last 128: 2020

Christian Bunse (born 6 January 1995) is a German former professional darts player who played in Professional Darts Corporation (PDC) events.

== Career ==
He made his PDC European Tour debut in the 2017 European Darts Open, but was defeated 6–4 by Jerry Hendriks. He then qualified for the 2018 European Darts Grand Prix, again losing in the first round, this time 6–2 to Jamie Lewis.

Bunse won a two-year PDC tour card on day 3 of the 2019 PDC European Q-School, beating Pavel Jirkal 5–2 in the final, he failed to make the top 64 at the end of 2020 partly due to restricted play during the COVID-19 pandemic, he returned to EU Q-School winning his Last 128 game against Patrick Bulen 6-4, but lost in the last 64 against Kevin Blumme 5-6.

Bunse contested the first 3 event on the EU PDC Challenge Tour 2021 but has not attended any PDC events since.
