= Robert Marijanović =

Croatian-German darts player

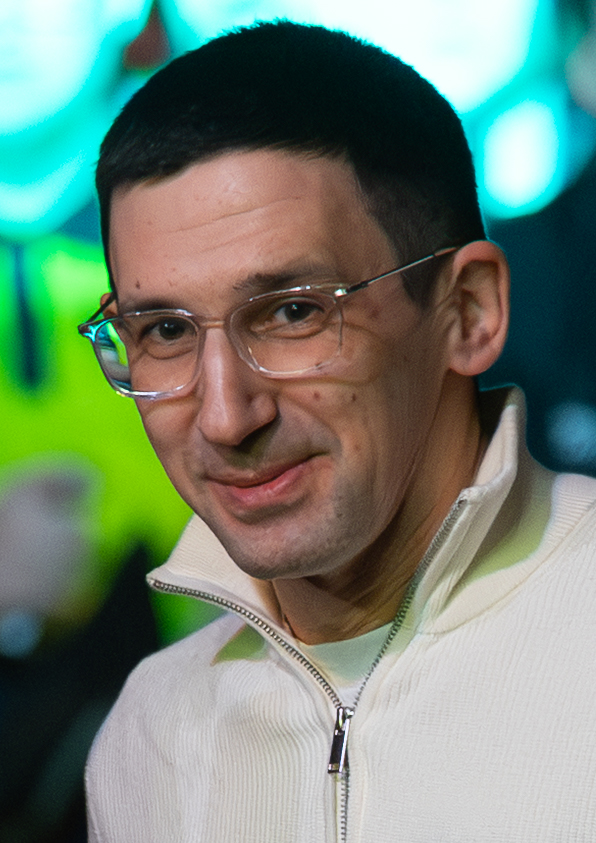

Personal information
- Nickname: "Robstar"
- Born: 6 May 1980 (age 46) Freudenstadt, Germany

Sport
- Sport: Darts
- Playing since: 1992
- Darts: 22g Evolution Signature
- Laterality: Right-handed
- Walk-on music: "Looking for Freedom" by David Hasselhoff

Organisation (see split in darts)
- PDC: 2007–2022

PDC premier events – best performances
- World Championship: Last 64: 2015
- UK Open: Last 128: 2019

Other tournament wins
- Years
Bulls Superleague Eastern Europe Play-offs	2014

Robert Marijanovic (born 6 May 1980) is a German darts player of Croatian heritage.

== Career ==
Marijanović qualified for the 2013 PDC World Darts Championship after coming through the Eastern European qualifier. He was beaten 3–4 by Northern Ireland's Daryl Gurney in the preliminary round.

In February 2013 he played in his first World Cup of Darts, representing Croatia alongside Tonči Restović and they advanced from Group G courtesy of a 5–3 victory over New Zealand. They survived two match darts from Northern Ireland in the last 16 to win 5–4 and face the Belgium brothers Ronny and Kim Huybrechts in the quarter-finals. Restović lost to Kim and Marijanović lost to Ronny 1–4 to expel Croatia from the tournament. In September 2014, Marijanović qualified for the European Darts Grand Prix and was beaten 6–2 by Ryan de Vreede in the first round. He won the Bulls Superleague Eastern Europe Play-offs to earn a place in the preliminary round of the 2015 World Championship with a 10–7 victory over Boris Krčmar. He survived three match darts from Jermaine Wattimena to beat him 4–3, but lost the first six legs of his first-round game against Stephen Bunting to be 2–0 down. Marijanović took the next set before Bunting took the fourth without reply to win 3–1.

Marijanović reached the main draw of three European Tour events in 2015. At the International Darts Open he whitewashed Christian Kist 6–0, before losing 6–5 to Brendan Dolan after being 4–2 up. He survived three match darts from Dirk van Duijvenbode at the European Darts Matchplay to edge through 6–5 to the second round, where he missed a total of 15 darts at doubles against Benito van de Pas, despite hitting a 170 finish and lost 6–4. Marijanović was knocked out of the European Darts Grand Prix first round after wasting a 5–2 lead over Wattimena to lose 6–5.

The only European Tour event Marijanović could reach in 2016 was the European Darts Grand Prix and he lost 6–3 to Cristo Reyes in the opening round.

On 5 January 2022 he relinquished his tour card.

== World Championship results ==
=== PDC ===
- 2013: Preliminary round (lost to Daryl Gurney 3–4) (legs)
- 2015: First round (lost to Stephen Bunting 1–3)
- 2019: First round (lost to Richard North 2–3)

== Performance timeline ==
Season	1	2	3	4	5	6	7	8	9	10	11	12	13	14	15	16	17	18	19	20	21	22	23
2018	BAR; 2R	BAR; 2R	BAR; 1R	BAR; 2R	MIL; 3R	MIL; 1R	BAR; 1R	BAR; 2R	WIG; 2R	WIG; 1R	MIL; 2R	MIL; 1R	WIG; 1R	WIG; 2R	BAR; 4R	BAR; 3R	BAR; 2R	BAR; 1R	DUB; 1R	DUB; 1R	BAR; 1R	BAR; 2R	
2021	Did not participate								NIE; 2R	NIE; 2R	NIE; 1R	NIE; 1R	Did not participate										
