= 2019 PDC Pro Tour =

Darts tournaments

The 2019 PDC Pro Tour was a series of non-televised darts tournaments organised by the Professional Darts Corporation (PDC). Players Championships and European Tour events are the events that make up the Pro Tour. There were 43 PDC ProTour events held, 30 Players Championships and 13 European Tour events.

There used to be UK Open qualifiers as part of this list, but they were abolished in September 2018 as the UK Open was made exclusive for the 128 Tour Card holders, 16 Challenge Tour qualifiers and 16 Riley's qualifiers.

This page also includes results from the PDC's affiliated tours including the Development and Challenge Tours and all the regional tours as well as the results from the World Championship regional qualifiers. There were 20 Challenge Tour events, 20 Development Tour events, 10 PDC Nordic & Baltic Events, 12 PDC Asia Events, 30 Dartplayers Australia ProTour events, 6 EuroAsian Darts Corporation ProTour Events and 10 Championship Darts Circuit ProTour events during the 2019 season.

The 2019 season in darts saw a major shift in the rules between players playing in the Professional Darts Corporation and the British Darts Organisation (BDO). For the first time since the split in darts, the BDO let players that play in their World Championships take part in the PDC's Qualifying School without withholding their money or banning them. With the change in rules, high profile players such as Glen Durrant, Scott Waites and Mark McGeeney committed themselves to the Qualifying School.

== Prize money ==
The prize money for the European Tour events have increased for 2019.

This is how the prize money is divided:

Stage	ET	PC	CT/DT
Winner	£25,000	£10,000	£2,000
Runner-up	£10,000	£6,000	£1,000
Semi-finalists	£6,500	£3,000	£500
Quarter-finalists	£5,000	£2,250	£300
Last 16	£3,000	£1,500	£200
Last 32	£2,000	£1,000	£100
Last 48	£1,000	N/A	N/A
Last 64	N/A	£500	£50
Total	£140,000	£75,000	£10,000

== PDC Tour Cards ==
128 players are granted Tour Cards, which enables them to participate in all Players Championships events, the UK Open and all the European Tour events.

=== Tour cards ===
The 2019 Tour Cards are awarded to:

- (64) The top 64 players from the PDC Order of Merit after the 2019 World Championship.
- (27) 27 qualifiers from 2018 Q-School not ranked in the top 64 of the PDC Order of Merit following the World Championship.
- (2) Two highest qualifiers from 2017 Challenge Tour (Wayne Jones and Mark Dudbridge).
- (1) The highest qualifiers from 2017 Development Tour (Luke Humphries and Adam Hunt).
  - Luke Humphries is also in the top 64 of the PDC Order of Merit, and therefore, one extra Tour Card will be awarded to a Q-School qualifier.
- (2) Two highest qualifiers from 2018 Challenge Tour (Michael Barnard and Ted Evetts (Note: Since Ted Evetts qualified through the 2018 Challenge Tour Order of Merit, as well as the 2018 Development Tour Order of Merit, Rowby-John Rodriguez was awarded a Tour Card as being the next player in line in the 2018 Development Tour Order of Merit.)).
- (2) Two highest qualifiers from 2018 Development Tour (Geert Nentjes and Rowby-John Rodriguez).
- (12) The 12 qualifiers from the 2019 Qualifying Schools.

Afterwards, the playing field will be complemented by the highest qualified players from the Q School Order of Merit until the maximum number of 128 Pro Tour Card players had been reached. In 2019, that means that a total of 18 players will qualify this way.

=== Q-School ===
The PDC Pro Tour Qualifying School (or Q-School) was split into a UK and European Q-School. Players that are not from Europe can choose which Q-School they want to compete in.

- The UK Q-School took place at the Robin Park Arena in Wigan from 17–20 January.
- The European Q-School took place at Halle 39 in Hildesheim from 3–6 January.

The following players won two-year tour cards on each of the days played:

European Q-School
3 January	4 January	5 January	6 January
Niels Zonneveld	Mike van Duivenbode	Christian Bunse	Darius Labanauskas
237 players	236 players	223 players	199 players
UK Q-School
17 January	18 January	19 January	20 January
Jamie Hughes; Harry Ward	Scott Baker; Mark McGeeney	Reece Robinson; Matt Clark	Nathan Derry; Kirk Shepherd
384 players	385 players	382 players	364 players

An Order of Merit was also created for each Q School. For every win after the first full round (without byes) the players get awarded 1 point.

To complete the field of 128 Tour Card Holders, places will be allocated down the final Qualifying School Order of Merits in proportion to the number of entrants. The following players picked up Tour Cards as a result:

UK Q-School Order of Merit

1. Jonathan Worsley
2. Carl Wilkinson
3. Glen Durrant
4. Gavin Carlin
5. Joe Murnan
6. Adrian Gray
7. Andy Boulton
8. Jamie Bain
9. David Pallett
10. Conan Whitehead
11. Barrie Bates

European Q-School Order of Merit

1. Madars Razma
2. Marko Kantele
3. Yordi Meeuwisse
4. Vincent van der Meer
5. John Michael
6. José de Sousa
7. Maik Kuivenhoven

== Players Championships ==
Thirty events took place in the Players Championship. This also saw the rules change to mimic the new final phase implemented in the European Tour in 2018, where all matches were best of 11 legs up until the quarter-final, but then became best of 13 legs for the semi-final and best of 15 legs for the final.

No.	Date	Venue	Winner	Legs	Runner-up	Ref.
1	Saturday 9 February	(England) Wigan, Robin Park Tennis Centre	Michael van Gerwen (109.45)	8 – 4	Jermaine Wattimena (98.80)	
2	Sunday 10 February	(England) Wigan, Robin Park Tennis Centre	Dave Chisnall (88.73)	8 – 7	Glen Durrant (92.48)	
3	Saturday 16 February	(England) Wigan, Robin Park Tennis Centre	Michael van Gerwen (105.72)	8 – 5	Ian White (95.20)	
4	Sunday 17 February	(England) Wigan, Robin Park Tennis Centre	Glen Durrant (96.24)	8 – 3	Dimitri Van den Bergh (97.21)	
5	Saturday 23 February	(England) Barnsley, Barnsley Metrodome	Gerwyn Price (109.71)	8 – 4	Gabriel Clemens (92.43)	
6	Sunday 24 February	(England) Barnsley, Barnsley Metrodome	Gerwyn Price (97.03)	8 – 4	Ricky Evans (87.79)	
7	Saturday 16 March	(England) Wigan, Robin Park Tennis Centre	Dave Chisnall (99.38)	8 – 6	Daryl Gurney (94.52)	
8	Sunday 17 March	(England) Wigan, Robin Park Tennis Centre	Adrian Lewis (101.11)	8 – 3	Raymond van Barneveld (95.17)	
9	Saturday 6 April	(England) Barnsley, Barnsley Metrodome	James Wade (98.00)	8 – 2	Michael Smith (84.11)	
10	Sunday 7 April	(England) Barnsley, Barnsley Metrodome	Jonny Clayton (103.29)	8 – 4	Gabriel Clemens (98.02)	
11	Saturday 13 April	(England) Barnsley, Barnsley Metrodome	James Wade (90.75)	8 – 6	Michael Smith (85.46)	
12	Sunday 14 April	(England) Barnsley, Barnsley Metrodome	James Wade (98.03)	8 – 5	Jeffrey de Zwaan (96.28)	
13	Tuesday 30 April	(England) Barnsley, Barnsley Metrodome	William O'Connor (98.58)	8 – 4	Nathan Aspinall (94.02)	
14	Wednesday 1 May	(England) Barnsley, Barnsley Metrodome	Jeffrey de Zwaan (96.18)	8 – 2	Stephen Bunting (88.01)	
15	Saturday 18 May	(England) Barnsley, Barnsley Metrodome	Glen Durrant (93.00)	8 – 1	Darius Labanauskas (84.06)	
16	Sunday 19 May	(England) Barnsley, Barnsley Metrodome	Harry Ward (92.87)	8 – 7	Max Hopp (91.74)	
17	Saturday 22 June	(England) Wigan, Robin Park Tennis Centre	Krzysztof Ratajski (98.74)	8 – 3	Nathan Aspinall (93.72)	
18	Sunday 23 June	(England) Wigan, Robin Park Tennis Centre	James Wade (94.45)	8 – 5	José de Sousa (98.80)	
19	Tuesday 16 July	(England) Barnsley, Barnsley Metrodome	Peter Wright (96.93)	8 – 5	Justin Pipe (103.26)	
20	Wednesday 17 July	(England) Barnsley, Barnsley Metrodome	Peter Wright (105.33)	8 – 1	Joe Cullen (92.64)	
21	Saturday 3 August	(Germany) Hildesheim, Halle 39	Krzysztof Ratajski (89.11)	8 – 7	Dimitri Van den Bergh (93.71)	
22	Sunday 4 August	(Germany) Hildesheim, Halle 39	Brendan Dolan (94.59)	8 – 5	Jermaine Wattimena (96.29)	
23	Tuesday 10 September	(England) Barnsley, Barnsley Metrodome	José de Sousa (95.68)	8 – 1	Gerwyn Price (84.79)	
24	Wednesday 11 September	(England) Barnsley, Barnsley Metrodome	James Wade (92.16)	8 – 6	Dave Chisnall (92.36)	
25	Saturday 21 September	(England) Barnsley, Barnsley Metrodome	Daryl Gurney (98.60)	8 – 5	Nathan Aspinall (97.04)	
26	Sunday 22 September	(England) Barnsley, Barnsley Metrodome	Mensur Suljović (97.09)	8 – 7	Ian White (107.04)	
27	Friday 4 October	(Republic of Ireland) Dublin, Citywest Hotel	Gerwyn Price (99.27)	8 – 7	Krzysztof Ratajski (95.47)	
28	Saturday 5 October	(Republic of Ireland) Dublin, Citywest Hotel	José de Sousa (93.84)	8 – 6	Glen Durrant (92.90)	
29	Monday 14 October	(England) Barnsley, Barnsley Metrodome	Brendan Dolan (98.46)	8 – 6	Ian White (96.44)	
30	Tuesday 15 October	(England) Barnsley, Barnsley Metrodome	Peter Wright (101.05)	8 – 1	Krzysztof Ratajski (94.10)	

== PDC European Tour ==
The PDC European Tour remained at 13 events, but included an event in the Czech Republic for the first time.

No.	Date	Event	Location	Winner	Legs	Runner-up	Ref.
1	22–24 March	European Darts Open	(Germany) Leverkusen, Ostermann-Arena	Michael van Gerwen (104.72)	8 – 6	Rob Cross (100.27)	
2	29–31 March	German Darts Championship	(Germany) Hildesheim, Halle 39	Daryl Gurney (98.32)	8 – 6	Ricky Evans (97.19)	
3	20–22 April	German Darts Grand Prix	(Germany) Munich, Kulturhalle Zenith	Michael van Gerwen (106.45)	8 – 3	Simon Whitlock (94.38)	
4	26–28 April	German Darts Open	(Germany) Saarbrücken, Saarlandhalle	Michael van Gerwen (100.22)	8 – 3	Ian White (94.22)	
5	3–5 May	Austrian Darts Open	(Austria) Premstätten, Steiermarkhalle	Michael van Gerwen (101.22)	8 – 7	Ian White (99.88)	
6	10–12 May	European Darts Grand Prix	(Germany) Sindelfingen, Glaspalast	Ian White (91.36)	8 – 7	Peter Wright (92.68)	
7	24–26 May	Dutch Darts Masters	(Netherlands) Zwolle, IJsselhallen	Ian White (93.01)	8 – 7	Michael van Gerwen (96.95)	
8	14–16 June	Danish Darts Open	(Denmark) Copenhagen, Brøndbyhallen	Dave Chisnall (98.92)	8 – 3	Chris Dobey (85.55)	
9	28–30 June	Czech Darts Open	(Czech Republic) Prague, PVA Expo Praha	Jamie Hughes (96.63)	8 – 3	Stephen Bunting (81.52)	
10	30 August–1 September	Austrian Darts Championship	(Austria) Schwechat, Multiversum Schwechat	Mensur Suljović (92.94)	8 – 7	Michael van Gerwen (99.39)	
11	6–8 September	European Darts Matchplay	(Germany) Mannheim, Maimarkthalle	Joe Cullen (101.30)	8 – 5	Michael van Gerwen (100.18)	
12	13–15 September	International Darts Open	(Germany) Riesa, SACHSENarena	Gerwyn Price (93.04)	8 – 6	Rob Cross (90.92)	
13	27–29 September	Gibraltar Darts Trophy	Gibraltar, Victoria Stadium	Krzysztof Ratajski (102.85)	8 – 2	Dave Chisnall (99.96)	

== PDC Challenge Tour ==
The Challenge Tour remained at 20 events in 2019.

No.	Date	Venue	Winner	Legs	Runner-up	Ref.
1	Saturday 26 January	(England) Wigan, Robin Park Tennis Centre	Shaun Carroll (84.83)	5 – 1	Patrick Lynskey (82.09)	
2	Saturday 26 January	(England) Wigan, Robin Park Tennis Centre	Stephen Burton (88.92)	5 – 4	Nathan Rafferty (88.62)	
3	Sunday 27 January	(England) Wigan, Robin Park Tennis Centre	Ritchie Edhouse (98.71)	5 – 3	Scott Taylor (96.44)	
4	Sunday 27 January	(England) Wigan, Robin Park Tennis Centre	Boris Koltsov (88.68)	5 – 4	Dave Prins (83.84)	
5	Saturday 11 May	(England) Wigan, Robin Park Tennis Centre	Darren Beveridge (96.81)	5 – 4	Callan Rydz (103.79)	
6	Saturday 11 May	(England) Wigan, Robin Park Tennis Centre	Cameron Menzies (90.33)	5 – 2	Andrew Gilding (88.07)	
7	Sunday 12 May	(England) Wigan, Robin Park Tennis Centre	Jesús Noguera (100.94)	5 – 1	Mark Walsh (77.31)	
8	Sunday 12 May	(England) Wigan, Robin Park Tennis Centre	Stephen Burton (84.16)	5 – 4	Patrick van den Boogard (86.49)	
9	Saturday 13 July	Peterborough, East of England Showground	Cody Harris (103.44)	5 – 1	Martin Atkins (92.61)	
10	Saturday 13 July	Peterborough, East of England Showground	Nick Fullwell (86.25)	5 – 1	Nathan Rafferty (80.15)	
11	Sunday 14 July	Peterborough, East of England Showground	Berry van Peer (95.44)	5 – 2	Cameron Menzies (80.72)	
12	Sunday 14 July	Peterborough, East of England Showground	Andy Jenkins (96.81)	5 – 4	Boris Koltsov (98.18)	
13	Saturday 10 August	(England) Wolverhampton, Aldersley Leisure Village	Cameron Menzies (86.97)	5 – 2	Wessel Nijman (88.06)	
14	Saturday 10 August	(England) Wolverhampton, Aldersley Leisure Village	Patrick Lynskey (88.25)	5 – 2	David Evans (93.22)	
15	Sunday 11 August	(England) Wolverhampton, Aldersley Leisure Village	Jesús Noguera (101.24)	5 – 2	Kyle McKinstry (92.91)	
16	Sunday 11 August	(England) Wolverhampton, Aldersley Leisure Village	Callan Rydz (102.18)	5 – 2	David Evans (96.26)	
17	Saturday 28 September	(England) Wigan, Robin Park Tennis Centre	Ciarán Teehan (98.45)	5 – 2	Berry van Peer (92.27)	
18	Saturday 28 September	(England) Wigan, Robin Park Tennis Centre	Callan Rydz (91.24)	5 – 1	Cody Harris (85.83)	
19	Sunday 29 September	(England) Wigan, Robin Park Tennis Centre	Kyle McKinstry (82.39)	5 – 1	Jason Cullen (78.60)	
20	Sunday 29 September	(England) Wigan, Robin Park Tennis Centre	Mark Barilli (84.75)	5 – 3	Ciarán Teehan (85.10)	

== PDC Development Tour ==
The Development Tour remained at 20 events in 2019.

No.	Date	Venue	Winner	Legs	Runner-up	Ref.
1	Saturday 9 March	(England) Wigan, Robin Park Tennis Centre	Ted Evetts (102.95)	5 – 0	Nathan Rafferty (90.76)	
2	Saturday 9 March	(England) Wigan, Robin Park Tennis Centre	Nathan Rafferty (95.03)	5 – 2	Aiden Cope (85.22)	
3	Sunday 10 March	(England) Wigan, Robin Park Tennis Centre	Ryan Meikle (86.24)	5 – 2	Greg Ritchie (84.62)	
4	Sunday 10 March	(England) Wigan, Robin Park Tennis Centre	Ted Evetts (88.42)	5 – 1	Andrew Davidson (79.94)	
5	Saturday 20 April	(England) Wigan, Robin Park Tennis Centre	Jeffrey de Zwaan (109.38)	5 – 3	Geert Nentjes (93.68)	
6	Saturday 20 April	(England) Wigan, Robin Park Tennis Centre	Corey Cadby (102.32)	5 – 3	Luke Humphries (91.59)	
7	Sunday 21 April	(England) Wigan, Robin Park Tennis Centre	Ryan Meikle (93.16)	5 – 2	Andrew Davidson (82.15)	
8	Sunday 21 April	(England) Wigan, Robin Park Tennis Centre	Callan Rydz (106.61)	5 – 2	Luke Humphries (93.89)	
9	Saturday 8 June	(England) Milton Keynes, Marshall Arena	Geert Nentjes (97.35)	5 – 2	Shane McGuirk (91.76)	
10	Saturday 8 June	(England) Milton Keynes, Marshall Arena	Ted Evetts (99.47)	5 – 3	Shane McGuirk (89.87)	
11	Sunday 9 June	(England) Milton Keynes, Marshall Arena	Luke Humphries (91.85)	5 – 3	Greg Ritchie (87.70)	
12	Sunday 9 June	(England) Milton Keynes, Marshall Arena	Ted Evetts (92.78)	5 – 0	Bradley Brooks (69.28)	
13	Saturday 17 August	(Germany) Hildesheim, Halle 39	Shane McGuirk (86.70)	5 – 4	Keane Barry (89.33)	
14	Saturday 17 August	(Germany) Hildesheim, Halle 39	Ted Evetts (95.94)	5 – 1	Owen Roelofs (86.35)	
15	Sunday 18 August	(Germany) Hildesheim, Halle 39	Geert Nentjes (86.42)	5 – 1	Nathan Girvan (69.24)	
16	Sunday 18 August	(Germany) Hildesheim, Halle 39	Ted Evetts (99.81)	5 – 3	Ciarán Teehan (84.51)	
17	Saturday 2 November	(England) Wigan, Robin Park Tennis Centre	Luke Humphries (102.00)	5 – 3	Ted Evetts (94.27)	
18	Saturday 2 November	(England) Wigan, Robin Park Tennis Centre	Ted Evetts (97.29)	5 – 4	Greg Ritchie (92.98)	
19	Sunday 3 November	(England) Wigan, Robin Park Tennis Centre	Ted Evetts (89.03)	5 – 2	Ciarán Teehan (82.43)	
20	Sunday 3 November	(England) Wigan, Robin Park Tennis Centre	Luke Humphries (91.88)	5 – 3	Geert Nentjes (92.73)	

== Professional Darts Corporation Nordic & Baltic ==
The Professional Darts Corporation Nordic & Baltic Tour hosted 10 events held over 5 weekends. The two leading players of the PDCNB Order of Merit took part in the 2020 PDC World Darts Championship. The leaders were Madars Razma and Darius Labanauskas, but as Labanauskas has qualified via the Pro Tour Order of Merit, the third placed player, Marko Kantele, also played at the World Championship.

No.	Date	Venue	Winner	Legs	Runner-up	Ref.
1	Saturday 2 February	(Sweden) Gothenburg, Apple Hotel & Konferens	Madars Razma (92.02)	6 – 0	Ulf Ceder (86.77)	
2	Sunday 3 February	(Sweden) Gothenburg, Apple Hotel & Konferens	Darius Labanauskas (90.23)	6 – 5	Marko Kantele (87.02)	
3	Saturday 9 March	(Denmark) Slangerup, Slangerup Dart Club	Madars Razma (92.02)	6 – 1	Darius Labanauskas (81.60)	
4	Sunday 10 March	(Denmark) Slangerup, Slangerup Dart Club	Dennis Nilsson (86.06)	6 – 5	Madars Razma (85.41)	
5	Saturday 24 August	(Iceland) Keflavík, Grænásbraut 606 (Ásbrú)	Darius Labanauskas (89.47)	6 – 5	Madars Razma (84.19)	
6	Sunday 25 August	(Iceland) Keflavík, Grænásbraut 606 (Ásbrú)	Marko Kantele (92.13)	6 – 4	Dennis Nilsson (89.94)	
7	Saturday 12 October	(Finland) Vääksy, Hotelli Tallukka	Darius Labanauskas (88.68)	6 – 5	Madars Razma (86.77)	
8	Sunday 13 October	(Finland) Vääksy, Hotelli Tallukka	Madars Razma (87.45)	6 – 3	Darius Labanauskas (87.25)	
9	Saturday 2 November	(Latvia) Riga, Bellevue Park Hotel	Madars Razma (79.56)	6 – 5	Veijo Viinikka (83.73)	
10	Sunday 3 November	(Latvia) Riga, Bellevue Park Hotel	Darius Labanauskas (87.82)	6 – 2	Per Laursen (87.44)	

== Professional Darts Corporation Asia ==
The Professional Darts Corporation Asian Tour hosted 12 events held over 6 weekends. Lourence Ilagan, Seigo Asada, Paul Lim and Noel Malicdem were the four players to qualify for the 2020 PDC World Darts Championship, but since Asada then went onto qualify by winning the PDJ Championships, Yuki Yamada took the extra space.

No.	Date	Venue	Winner	Legs	Runner-up	Ref.
1	Saturday 26 January	(South Korea) Seoul, KBS Sports World	Royden Lam (98.39)	5 – 4	Paul Lim (105.30)	
2	Sunday 27 January	(South Korea) Seoul, KBS Sports World	Paul Lim (90.03)	5 – 2	Kai Fan Leung (81.74)	
3	Saturday 16 February	(Japan) Kobe, Kobe Sanbo-Hall	Haruki Muramatsu (88.94)	5 – 3	Seigo Asada (98.87)	
4	Sunday 17 February	(Japan) Kobe, Kobe Sanbo-Hall	Seigo Asada (88.01)	5 – 3	Royden Lam (80.50)	
5	Saturday 30 March	(Philippines) Palo, Leyte Academic Center	Noel Malicdem (92.12)	5 – 2	Teng Lieh Pupo (90.03)	
6	Sunday 31 March	(Philippines) Palo, Leyte Academic Center	Lourence Ilagan (90.27)	5 – 3	Yuki Yamada (87.60)	
7	Saturday 22 June	(Taiwan) Taipei, G Club	Lourence Ilagan (110.32)	5 – 2	Noel Malicdem (92.73)	
8	Sunday 23 June	(Taiwan) Taipei, G Club	Lourence Ilagan (89.87)	5 – 4	Noel Malicdem (86.60)	
9	Saturday 27 July	Hong Kong, Kowloonbay International Trade & Exhibition Centre	Paul Lim (90.00)	5 – 1	Zong Xiao Chen (85.79)	
10	Sunday 28 July	Hong Kong, Kowloonbay International Trade & Exhibition Centre	Yuki Yamada (89.54)	5 – 4	Paul Lim (87.22)	
11	Saturday 31 August	Singapore, AUPE Club	Seigo Asada (94.18)	5 – 2	Noel Malicdem (92.29)	
12	Sunday 1 September	Singapore, AUPE Club	Seigo Asada (90.36)	5 – 4	Lourence Ilagan (100.80)	

== Dartplayers Australia (DPA) Pro Tour ==
The leading player of the 30 tournaments on the 2019 DPA Tour series will play at the 2020 PDC World Darts Championship. That player was Damon Heta.

No.	Date	Venue	Winner	Legs	Runner-up	Ref.
1	Friday 1 February	(Australia) Barrack Heights, Warilla Bowls and Recreation Club	(93.61) James Bailey	6 – 2	Damon Heta (87.77)	
2	Saturday 2 February	(Australia) Barrack Heights, Warilla Bowls and Recreation Club	(83.90) Steve Fitzpatrick	6 – 5	James Bailey (83.22)	
3	Saturday 2 February	(Australia) Barrack Heights, Warilla Bowls and Recreation Club	(100.24) Damon Heta	6 – 1	Haupai Puha (92.85)	
4	Sunday 3 February	(Australia) Barrack Heights, Warilla Bowls and Recreation Club	(94.36) Damon Heta	6 – 1	Steve Fitzpatrick (78.32)	
5	Friday 1 March	(Australia) Brisbane, Pine Rivers Darts Club	(83.04) Ben Robb	6 – 3	Koha Kokiri (78.38)	
6	Saturday 2 March	(Australia) Brisbane, Pine Rivers Darts Club	(80.43) David Littleboy	6 – 5	Haupai Puha (81.22)	
7	Saturday 2 March	(Australia) Brisbane, Pine Rivers Darts Club	(87.91) Damon Heta	6 – 1	Raymond Smith (79.13)	
8	Sunday 3 March	(Australia) Brisbane, Pine Rivers Darts Club	(90.26) James Bailey	6 – 5	David Platt (90.48)	
9	Friday 5 April	(Australia) Devonport, East Devonport Recreation Centre	(88.38) Gordon Mathers	6 – 3	Ben Robb (87.02)	
10	Saturday 6 April	(Australia) Devonport, East Devonport Recreation Centre	(93.38) James Bailey	6 – 1	Mick Lacey (84.89)	
11	Saturday 6 April	(Australia) Devonport, East Devonport Recreation Centre	(89.03) Gordon Mathers	6 – 3	Damon Heta (80.61)	
12	Sunday 7 April	(Australia) Devonport, East Devonport Recreation Centre	(82.15) Raymond O'Donnell	6 – 4	Shane Tichowitsch (86.78)	
13	Thursday 2 May	(Australia) Dubbo, Macquarie INN	(83.85) James Bailey	6 – 2	Ryan Lynch (75.02)	
14	Friday 3 May	(Australia) Dubbo, Macquarie INN	(91.29) Robbie King	6 – 4	Ben Robb (91.97)	
15	Friday 3 May	(Australia) Dubbo, Macquarie INN	(90.40) Haupai Puha	6 – 3	Ben Robb (86.57)	
16	Saturday 4 May	(Australia) Dubbo, Macquarie INN	(80.20) Robbie King	6 – 5	Steve Fitzpatrick (79.35)	
17	Saturday 4 May	(Australia) Dubbo, Macquarie INN	(90.59) Koha Kokiri	6 – 2	Steve Fitzpatrick (84.82)	
18	Sunday 5 May	(Australia) Dubbo, Macquarie INN	(90.88) Haupai Puha	6 – 4	Koha Kokiri (90.50)	
19	Friday 31 May	(Australia) Barooga, Cobram Sports Club	(92.39) Ben Robb	6 – 2	James Bailey (85.92)	
20	Saturday 1 June	(Australia) Barooga, Cobram Sports Club	(89.57) Damon Heta	6 – 3	Koha Kokiri (82.32)	
21	Saturday 1 June	(Australia) Barooga, Cobram Sports Club	(90.21) Haupai Puha	6 – 5	Damon Heta (92.98)	
22	Sunday 2 June	(Australia) Barooga, Cobram Sports Club	(95.37) Damon Heta	6 – 3	James Bailey (89.93)	
23	Friday 20 September	(Australia) Melbourne, Seaford Hotel	(80.79) Raymond O'Donnell	6 – 1	Robbie King (80.69)	
24	Saturday 21 September	(Australia) Melbourne, Seaford Hotel	(88.69) Tim Pusey	6 – 5	Gordon Mathers (82.08)	
25	Saturday 21 September	(Australia) Melbourne, Seaford Hotel	(89.14) Damon Heta	6 – 4	Gordon Mathers (90.75)	
26	Sunday 22 September	(Australia) Melbourne, Seaford Hotel	(92.73) Damon Heta	6 – 1	Gordon Mathers (83.97)	
27	Friday 11 October	(Australia) Canberra, Labour Club	(85.05) Robbie King	6 – 3	Damon Heta (82.16)	
28	Saturday 12 October	(Australia) Canberra, Labour Club	(86.24) Gordon Mathers	6 – 4	Mal Cuming (82.77)	
29	Saturday 12 October	(Australia) Canberra, Labour Club	(92.53) Gordon Mathers	6 – 4	Mal Cuming (93.14)	
30	Sunday 13 October	(Australia) Canberra, Labour Club	(89.20) Damon Heta	6 – 3	James Bailey (81.21)	

== EuroAsian Darts Corporation (EADC) Pro Tour ==
The EuroAsian Darts Corporation hosted 6 events held over 2 weekends. The winner of the EADC Championship will play at the 2020 PDC World Darts Championship. Boris Koltsov took the title and the place at the World Championship.

No.	Date	Venue	Winner	Legs	Runner-up	Ref.
1	Saturday 23 February	(Russia) Moscow, Omega Plaza Business Center	Aleksei Kadochnikov (89.16)	6 – 4	Andrey Pontus (83.81)	
2	Saturday 23 February	(Russia) Moscow, Omega Plaza Business Center	Andrey Pontus (77.40)	6 – 2	Dmitriy Gorbunov (76.85)	
3	Sunday 24 February	(Russia) Moscow, Omega Plaza Business Center	Aleksei Kadochnikov (84.06)	6 – 3	Maxim Aldoshin (79.82)	
4	Saturday 27 April	(Russia) Moscow, Omega Plaza Business Center	Boris Koltsov (85.53)	6 – 1	Roman Obukhov (78.00)	
5	Saturday 27 April	(Russia) Moscow, Omega Plaza Business Center	Boris Koltsov (83.58)	6 – 4	Roman Obukhov (76.05)	
6	Sunday 28 April	(Russia) Moscow, Omega Plaza Business Center	Boris Koltsov (95.75)	6 – 3	Roman Obukhov (77.30)	

== Championship Darts Corporation (CDC) Pro Tour ==
The Championship Darts Corporation hosted 10 events held over 5 weekends. The top ranked players from Canada and the USA will play at the 2020 PDC World Darts Championship. The leading players are Matt Campbell and Darin Young.

No.	Date	Venue	Winner	Legs	Runner-up	Ref.
1	Saturday 30 March	(United States) Philadelphia, Columbia Social Club	Darin Young (86.05)	6 – 3	Dave Richardson (86.71)	
2	Sunday 31 March	(United States) Philadelphia, Columbia Social Club	Jim Long (88.70)	6 – 5	Darin Young (85.61)	
3	Saturday 4 May	(Canada) Waterdown, Royal Canadian Legion Branch 551	Darin Young (92.02)	6 – 0	Jeff Smith (80.93)	
4	Sunday 5 May	(Canada) Waterdown, Royal Canadian Legion Branch 551	Danny Lauby (84.98)	6 – 5	Joe Huffman (85.52)	
5	Saturday 1 June	(United States) Skokie, Holiday Inn North Shore	Matt Campbell (95.49)	6 – 2	Darin Young (87.59)	
6	Sunday 2 June	(United States) Skokie, Holiday Inn North Shore	Joe Huffman (90.97)	6 – 4	Matt Campbell (92.24)	
7	Saturday 10 August	(United States) Wheeling, Ramada Plaza Hotel North Shore	Jeremiah Millar (77.01)	6 – 5	Matt Campbell (80.23)	
8	Sunday 11 August	(United States) Wheeling, Ramada Plaza Hotel North Shore	Matt Campbell (91.65)	6 – 2	Kiley Edmunds (85.84)	
9	Saturday 14 September	(United States) Philadelphia, Columbia Social Club	Darin Young (85.08)	6 – 3	Jim Long (80.34)	
10	Sunday 15 September	(United States) Philadelphia, Columbia Social Club	Danny Baggish (98.32)	6 – 2	Joe Huffman (89.55)	

== World Championship International Qualifiers ==
Date	Event	Venue	Winner	Score	Runner-up	Ref.
Thursday 4 July	North American Championship	(United States) Las Vegas, Mandalay Bay	Danny Baggish (88.56)	6 – 5	Jeff Smith (86.53)	
Monday 16 September	PDJ Japanese Qualifier	(Japan) Osaka, Sakai City Industrial Promotion Center	Seigo Asada (80.98)	5 – 2	Kouta Suzuki (84.58)	
Saturday 21 September	East Europe Qualifier	(Hungary) Vecsés, Bálint Ágnes Cultural Center	Benjamin Pratnemer (87.40)	6 – 1	János Végső (71.74)	
Sunday 22 September	India Qualifier	(India) Chennai, Madras Race Club	Nitin Kumar (83.64)	6 – 1	Ravi Bhat (59.82)	
Saturday 12 October	Tom Kirby Memorial Irish Matchplay	(Republic of Ireland) Dublin, Citywest Hotel	Keane Barry (84.14)	6 – 5	Liam Gallagher (82.70)	
Saturday 19 October	South-West Europe Qualifier	(Spain) Ávila, Lienzo Norte Congress and Exhibition Center	José Justicia (102.86)	6 – 2	Toni Alcinas (96.67)	
Saturday 19 October	West Europe Qualifier	(Netherlands) Leeuwarden, WTC Expo	Jan Dekker	6 – 5	Derk Telnekes	
Saturday 26 October	Oceanic Masters	(Australia) Barrack Heights, Warilla Bowls and Recreation Club	Robbie King (87.96)	3 – 1	Steve Fitzpatrick (87.47)	
Saturday 26 October	PDC China Qualifier	(China) Ningbo, Yinzhou District Darts Association Training Base	Xiaochen Zong (82.31)	6 – 5	Xicheng Han (82.82)	
Sunday 27 October	EuroAsian Darts Corporation Qualifier	(Russia) Moscow, Omega Plaza Business Center	Boris Koltsov (84.86)	3 – 0	Aleksei Kadochnikov (81.12)	
Sunday 27 October	African Qualifier	(South Africa) Cape Town, Erica Park	Devon Petersen (100.20)	6 – 0	Masande Mgedeza (83.12)	
Saturday 9 November	DPNZ Qualifier	(New Zealand) Wellington, Porirua Club	Ben Robb (78.46)	7 – 3	Mark Cleaver (77.37)	
Saturday 9 November	South-East Europe Qualifier	(Austria) Eisenstadt, Kultur Kongress Zentrum	Zoran Lerchbacher (93.78)	6 – 5	Rusty-Jake Rodriguez (90.54)	
Saturday 9 November	South-Central America Qualifier	(Brazil) Nova Friburgo, Nova Friburgo Country Clube	Diogo Portela	6 – 4	Sudesh Fitzgerald	
Saturday 16 November	Rest of the World Women's Qualifier	(Germany) Hildesheim, Halle 39	Mikuru Suzuki (78.48)	6 – 3	Kasumi Sato (74.81)	
Sunday 17 November	German Super League	(Germany) Hildesheim, Halle 39	Nico Kurz (94.23)	10 – 6	Martin Schindler (87.12)	
Sunday 24 November	World Youth Championship	(England) Minehead, Butlin's Minehead	Luke Humphries (92.07)	6 – 0	Adam Gawlas (78.42)	
Monday 25 November	Tour Card Holders' Qualifier	(England) Wigan, Robin Park Arena	Benito van de Pas (99.59)	7 – 4	Robert Owen (92.88)	
Monday 25 November	Tour Card Holders' Qualifier	(England) Wigan, Robin Park Arena	Kevin Burness (95.54)	7 – 3	Bradley Brooks (95.15)	
Monday 25 November	Tour Card Holders' Qualifier	(England) Wigan, Robin Park Arena	Matthew Edgar (83.48)	7 – 4	Adam Hunt (83.04)	
Monday 25 November	UK & Ireland Women's Qualifier	(England) Wigan, Robin Park Arena	Fallon Sherrock (75.13)	6 – 3	Natalie Gilbert (73.42)	
