= Harry Ward (darts player) =

English darts player (born 1997)

Personal information
- Nickname: "Big H"
- Born: 13 June 1997 (age 29) Burton-upon-Trent, Staffordshire, England
- Home town: Swadlincote, Derbyshire, England

Sport
- Sport: Darts
- Playing since: 2012
- Darts: 22g Unicorn Signature
- Laterality: Right-handed
- Walk-on music: "A Little Respect" by Erasure

Organisation (see split in darts)
- PDC: 2014–2020, 2023, 2026–present
- Current world ranking: (PDC) 131 ▼2 (29 October 2026)

PDC premier events – best performances
- World Championship: Last 64: 2020
- UK Open: Last 64: 2018, 2020
- PC Finals: Last 64: 2019
- World Series Finals: Last 24: 2020

Other tournament wins
- Years
Players Championships
2019

Harry Ward (born 13 June 1997) is an English professional darts player who competes in Professional Darts Corporation (PDC) events. He won his maiden PDC ranking title at Players Championship 16 on the 2019 PDC Pro Tour.

== Career ==
He reached the final of the 2015 BDO World Youth Championships, losing 3–0 in the final to Colin Roelofs.

In January 2019, Ward won a two-year PDC Tour Card by right on the first day of the event, beating Mark McGeeney 5–2 in the final.

In 2019, Ward won his first PDC ranking title at Players Championship 16 on the 2019 PDC Pro Tour, beating Max Hopp 8–7 in the final.

Later in the year, he qualified for his World Championship debut via the PDC Pro Tour Order of Merit. At the tournament Ward defeated Madars Razma 3–2 in sets in the first round. In the second round, he lost 3–0 to Simon Whitlock.

After the restart of the season due to COVID-19, Ward came through the qualifying rounds to earn a debut appearance in the 2020 World Series of Darts Finals. At the event, he lost 6–2 to Darius Labanauskas.

In September 2020, he announced a shock decision to step away from the PDC circuit at the end of the 2020 season.

== World Championship results ==
=== PDC ===
- 2020: Second round (lost to Simon Whitlock 0–3) (sets)

== Performance timeline ==
Tournament	2016	2017	2018	2019	2020
PDC World Championship	Did not qualify				2R
UK Open	2R	DNQ	3R	3R	4R
Players Championship Finals	Did not qualify			1R	DNQ
Non-ranked televised events
World Series of Darts Finals	Did not qualify				1R
Career statistics
Year-end ranking	171	195	183	71	57

=== PDC Players Championships ===
Season	1	2	3	4	5	6	7	8	9	10	11	12	13	14	15	16	17	18	19	20	21	22	23	24	25	26	27	28	29	30	31	32	33	34
2017	Did not participate																				BAR; 3R	BAR; 2R												
2018	Did not participate									WIG; 2R	Did not participate						BAR; 1R	Did not participate																
2019	WIG; QF	WIG; 1R	WIG; 3R	WIG; 2R	BAR; 2R	BAR; 1R	WIG; 3R	WIG; 4R	BAR; 2R	BAR; 1R	BAR; 2R	BAR; 2R	BAR; 2R	BAR; QF	BAR; 2R	BAR; W	WIG; 2R	WIG; 2R	BAR; QF	BAR; 1R	HIL; 3R	HIL; 4R	BAR; 1R	BAR; 1R	BAR; 2R	BAR; 1R	DUB; 2R	DUB; 1R	BAR; 1R	BAR; 2R				
2020	BAR; 1R	BAR; 1R	WIG; 1R	WIG; 2R	WIG; 1R	WIG; 1R	BAR; 1R	BAR; 1R	MIL; 1R	MIL; 2R	MIL; 2R	MIL; 1R	MIL; 2R	NIE; 2R	NIE; 1R	NIE; 1R	NIE; 1R	NIE; 1R	COV; DNP															
2023	Did not participate										LEI; 1R	LEI; 1R	Did not participate															BAR; 1R	BAR; DNP					
2026	Did not participate														LEI; 1R	LEI; 1R	LEI; DNP	LEI; SF	MIL; 3R	MIL; 2R	WIG; 1R	WIG; 1R	LEI; 3R	LEI; 2R	HIL; 1R	HIL; 1R	LEI; 2R	LEI; 1R	ROS; DNP				LEI; 1R	LEI; 3R
