= Yuki Yamada (darts player) =

Japanese darts player

Yūki Yamada
Personal information
- Nickname: "Yammer"
- Born: 24 July 1983 (age 43) Fukuoka, Japan

Sport
- Sport: Darts
- Playing since: 2001
- Darts: 21g Trinidad
- Laterality: Right-handed
- Walk-on music: "Pump Up the Jam" by Technotronic

Organisation (see split in darts)
- PDC: 2007–

PDC premier events – best performances
- World Championship: Last 64: 2020

Other tournament wins
- Years
PDC Asian Tour Hong Kong	2019

Yūki Yamada (山田 勇樹, Yamada Yūki; born 24 July 1983) is a Japanese professional darts player who plays in Professional Darts Corporation (PDC) events.

== Career ==
Yamada first came to prominence in 2015, when he was one of eight Japanese qualifiers who played in the 2015 Japan Darts Masters, where he lost 6–2 to Gary Anderson, although he hit a 121 checkout, one of the highest in the tournament.

He then represented Japan alongside Haruki Muramatsu in the 2017 PDC World Cup of Darts, where they let a 3–1 lead slip into a 5–3 defeat against the Spanish duo of Cristo Reyes and Toni Alcinas.

His big breakthrough came in 2019, where he won a PDC Asian Tour event in Hong Kong, defeating Paul Lim in the final. He finished 5th in the Asian Tour standings, but thanks to Seigo Asada winning the PDJ Championships, he qualified for the 2020 PDC World Darts Championship.

== World Championship results ==
=== PDC ===
- 2020: Second round (lost to Darren Webster 0–3)
- 2022: First round (lost to Callan Rydz 0–3)
