= 2020 PDC World Darts Championship =

27th edition of the PDC's World Championship event

2019/20 William Hill World Darts Championship

Tournament information
- Dates: 13 December 2019 – 1 January 2020
- Venue: Alexandra Palace
- Location: London, England
- Organisation(s): Professional Darts Corporation (PDC)
- Format: Sets; Final – first to 7 sets
- Prize fund: £2,500,000
- Winner's share: £500,000
- High checkout: 170; Gary Anderson; Steve Beaton; Glen Durrant; Ricky Evans; Ben Robb; Ryan Searle; Michael van Gerwen; Peter Wright

Champion(s)
- Peter Wright (SCO)

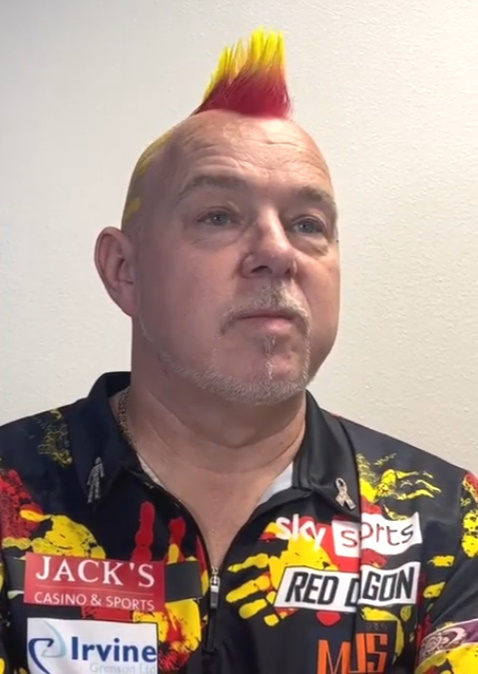
Seventh seed Peter Wright won the World Championship for the first time in his career.

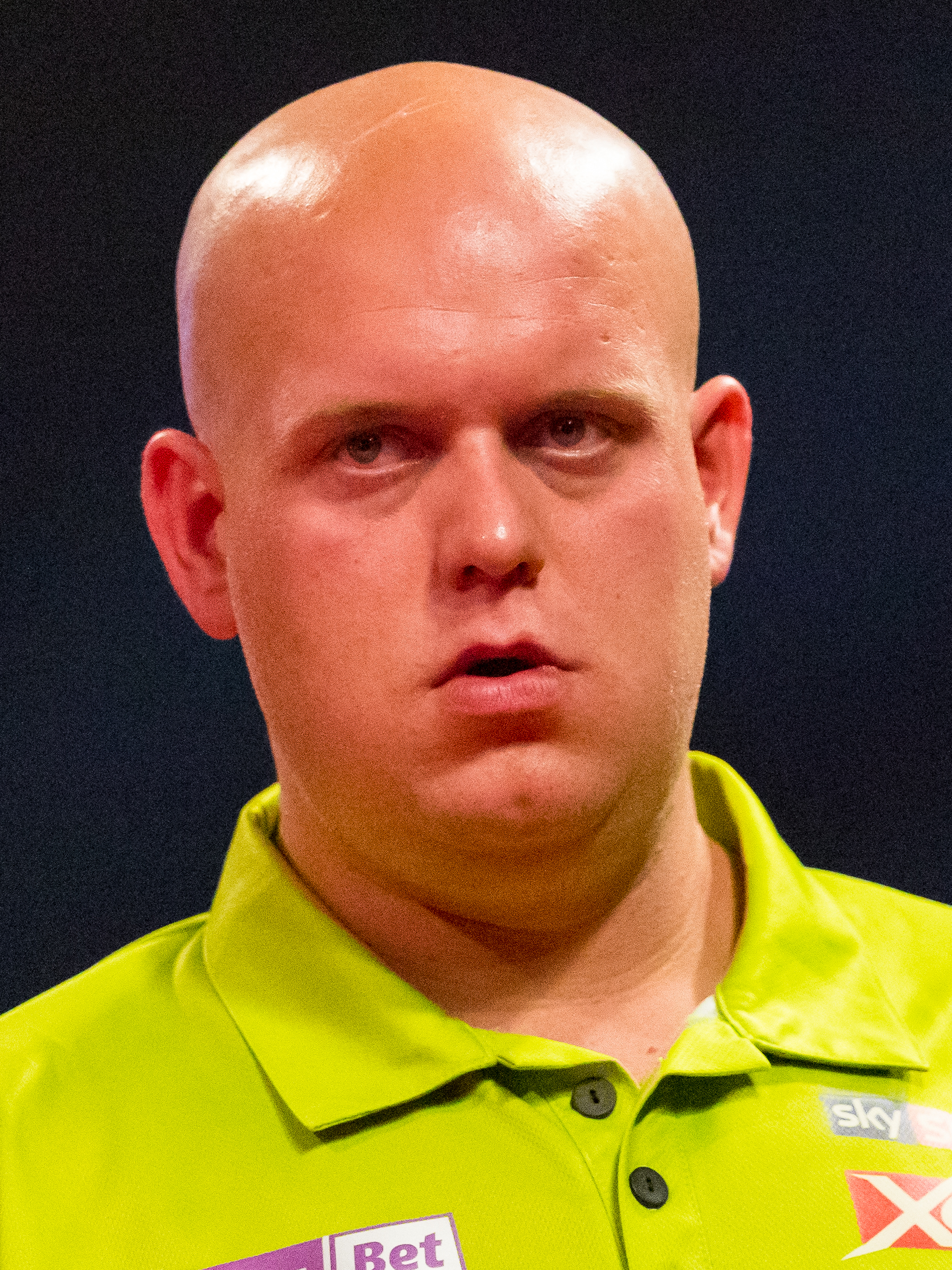
Michael van Gerwen, the number one seed and reigning champion, reached the fifth World Championship final of his career.

The 2020 PDC World Darts Championship (known for sponsorship reasons as the 2019/20 William Hill World Darts Championship) was the twenty-seventh World Championship organised by the Professional Darts Corporation since it separated from the British Darts Organisation. The event took place at Alexandra Palace in London from 13 December 2019 to 1 January 2020.

Michael van Gerwen was the defending champion, after defeating Michael Smith 7–3 in the 2019 final.

Raymond van Barneveld announced his intention to retire from professional darts with this tournament, playing his planned last match in the first round against Darin Young. He subsequently reversed this decision after a year out.

Fallon Sherrock became the first female player to win a match at a PDC World Championship, beating Ted Evetts 3–2 in the first round. She then went on to beat Mensur Suljović 3–1 in the second round, before losing 2–4 to Chris Dobey.

Peter Wright won his first World Championship, beating Van Gerwen 7–3 in the final.

== Format ==
All matches were played as single in, double out; requiring the players to score 501 points to win a leg, finishing on either a double or the bullseye. Matches were played to set format, with each set being the best of five legs (first to three). For all rounds except the first, the final set had to be won by two clear legs, unless the set score went to 5–5, in which case a deciding leg would be played with the players throwing for the bull to decide who threw first.

The matches got longer as the tournament progressed:

- First round: Best of five sets (no tie-break)
- Second round: Best of five sets
- Third round: Best of seven sets
- Fourth round: Best of seven sets
- Quarter-finals: Best of nine sets
- Semi-finals: Best of eleven sets
- Finals: Best of thirteen sets

== Prize money ==
The prize money for the tournament was £2,500,000 in total – the same as in the previous year. The winner's share was £500,000. A special prize of £100,000 was available to any player who hits two nine-dart finishes, a feat which has never previously been achieved at any World Championship.

Position (num. of players)		Prize money (Total: £2,500,000)
Winner	(1)	£500,000
Runner-up	(1)	£200,000
Semi-finalists	(2)	£100,000
Quarter-finalists	(4)	£50,000
Fourth round losers	(8)	£35,000
Third round losers	(16)	£25,000
Second round losers	(32)	£15,000
First round losers	(32)	£7,500

== Qualification ==
=== Qualifiers ===
The top 32 from the PDC Order of Merit began the competition in the second round. The 32 highest ranked players on the PDC Pro Tour Order of Merit (not already qualified) and 32 qualifiers from around the world, including two female players, began in the first round.

Order of Merit
Second round (seeded)

1. (Netherlands) Michael van Gerwen (runner-up)
2. (England) Rob Cross (second round)
3. (Wales) Gerwyn Price (semi-finals)
4. (England) Michael Smith (second round)
5. (Scotland) Gary Anderson (fourth round)
6. (Northern Ireland) Daryl Gurney (third round)
7. (Scotland) Peter Wright (champion)
8. (England) James Wade (third round)
9. (England) Ian White (second round)
10. (England) Dave Chisnall (third round)
11. (Austria) Mensur Suljović (second round)
12. (England) Nathan Aspinall (semi-finals)
13. (England) Adrian Lewis (fourth round)
14. (Australia) Simon Whitlock (fourth round)
15. (England) Joe Cullen (second round)
16. (Wales) Jonny Clayton (third round)
17. (England) Stephen Bunting (fourth round)
18. (Netherlands) Jermaine Wattimena (second round)
19. (England) Mervyn King (third round)
20. (England) Darren Webster (third round)
21. (Poland) Krzysztof Ratajski (third round)
22. (England) Chris Dobey (fourth round)
23. (Netherlands) Jeffrey de Zwaan (fourth round)
24. (Germany) Max Hopp (third round)
25. (England) Steve Beaton (fourth round)
26. (England) Keegan Brown (second round)
27. (England) Glen Durrant (quarter-finals)
28. (England) Steve West (second round)
29. (Belgium) Dimitri Van den Bergh (quarter-finals)
30. (Scotland) John Henderson (third round)
31. (Netherlands) Danny Noppert (third round)
32. (England) Ricky Evans (third round)

Pro Tour Order of Merit
First round

1. (England) Jamie Hughes (first round)
2. (Portugal) José de Sousa (first round)
3. (Netherlands) Vincent van der Voort (second round)
4. (Northern Ireland) Brendan Dolan (second round)
5. (Germany) Gabriel Clemens (first round)
6. (England) Justin Pipe (second round)
7. (Republic of Ireland) William O'Connor (second round)
8. (Netherlands) Ron Meulenkamp (second round)
9. (England) Harry Ward (second round)
10. (England) Ross Smith (first round)
11. (Australia) Kyle Anderson (second round)
12. (Belgium) Kim Huybrechts (fourth round)
13. (England) Ted Evetts (first round)
14. (England) Andy Boulton (first round)
15. (England) Ryan Joyce (first round)
16. (Netherlands) Raymond van Barneveld (first round)
17. (England) Luke Humphries (quarter-finals)
18. (Lithuania) Darius Labanauskas (quarter-finals)
19. (England) Ryan Searle (third round)
20. (England) Arron Monk (first round)
21. (England) Ritchie Edhouse (second round)
22. (England) Mark McGeeney (second round)
23. (England) Josh Payne (second round)
24. (Spain) Cristo Reyes (second round)
25. (England) James Richardson (second round)
26. (Netherlands) Jelle Klaasen (second round)
27. (England) James Wilson (first round)
28. (England) Luke Woodhouse (third round)
29. (Republic of Ireland) Steve Lennon (first round)
30. (Austria) Rowby-John Rodriguez (first round)
31. (England) Ryan Meikle (first round)
32. (Northern Ireland) Mickey Mansell (first round)

International Qualifiers
First round

- (Japan) Seigo Asada (third round)
- (United States) Danny Baggish (second round)
- (Republic of Ireland) Keane Barry (first round)
- (Northern Ireland) Kevin Burness (first round)
- (Canada) Matt Campbell (first round)
- (Netherlands) Jan Dekker (second round)
- (England) Matthew Edgar (first round)
- (Australia) Damon Heta (second round)
- (Philippines) Lourence Ilagan (first round)
- José Justicia (second round)
- (Finland) Marko Kantele (first round)
- (Australia) Robbie King (first round)
- (Russia) Boris Koltsov (first round)
- (India) Nitin Kumar (first round)
- (Germany) Nico Kurz (third round)
- (Austria) Zoran Lerchbacher (second round)
- (Singapore) Paul Lim (first round)
- (Philippines) Noel Malicdem (second round)
- (Netherlands) Geert Nentjes (first round)
- (South Africa) Devon Petersen (first round)
- (Brazil) Diogo Portela (first round)
- (Slovenia) Benjamin Pratnemer (first round)
- (Latvia) Madars Razma (first round)
- (New Zealand) Ben Robb (first round)
- (England) Callan Rydz (second round)
- (England) Fallon Sherrock (third round)
- (Japan) Mikuru Suzuki (first round)
- (Republic of Ireland) Ciarán Teehan (second round)
- (Netherlands) Benito van de Pas (second round)
- (Japan) Yuki Yamada (second round)
- (United States) Darin Young (second round)
- (China) Xiaochen Zong (first round)

=== Background ===
Michael van Gerwen, the reigning champion from the 2019 championship, who also won the 2014 and 2017 championship, was top of the two-year PDC Order of Merit and number one seed going into the tournament, having won six of the ten premier singles events held since the previous championship. 2018 world champion and reigning World Matchplay and European champion Rob Cross took the second seeding. As well as Van Gerwen and Cross, two other previous PDC world champions qualified as seeds, two-time champions Gary Anderson (5th seed) and Adrian Lewis (13th seed). Three-time consecutive reigning BDO world darts champion Glen Durrant took the 27th seeding on his PDC debut. As well as Durrant, 17th seed Stephen Bunting and 25th seed Steve Beaton were also previous champions of the BDO World Darts Championship.

The top seeds below Van Gerwen and Cross were two-time Grand Slam of Darts winner Gerwyn Price, 2019 World Championship runner-up Michael Smith, Gary Anderson, 2018 Players Championship Finals winner Daryl Gurney and 2019 German Darts Masters champion Peter Wright. 2019 UK Open champion Nathan Aspinall was the 12th seed.

2019 Czech Darts Open champion Jamie Hughes, in his first year as a full PDC tour card holder, was the highest-ranked non-seed on the 2019 PDC Pro Tour Order of Merit. As well as Hughes, five other qualifiers from the Pro Tour made their PDC World Championship debuts; Harry Ward, Ritchie Edhouse, Mark McGeeney, Luke Woodhouse and Ryan Meikle.

2007 PDC world champion Raymond van Barneveld qualified via the Pro Tour in his final year before retirement. Both Van Barneveld and fellow Dutchman Jelle Klaasen were former champions of the BDO World Darts Championship who qualified via the Pro Tour. Other players to qualify through the Pro Tour included 2019 World Grand Prix semi-finalist Chris Dobey, 2019 PDC World Youth Champion Luke Humphries and the 2019 PDC World Cup of Darts finalists from Ireland, William O'Connor and Steve Lennon.

The final group of 32 qualifiers was determined by a series of international qualifiers and secondary tours. 2019 Brisbane Darts Masters champion Damon Heta, the first player to win a World Series of Darts event in their own country, topped the Dartplayers Australia rankings, while Keane Barry won the Tom Kirby Memorial Irish Matchplay to qualify, having already qualified to play in the Junior Darts Corporation World Championship final held during the tournament. Barry was the youngest player at the 2020 championships and the third youngest all-time.

Two qualifiers were held for female players. The UK & Ireland qualifier was won by Fallon Sherrock, the 2015 BDO Women's World Championship runner-up, while the Rest of the World Qualifier was won by Mikuru Suzuki, the reigning women's champion from the 2019 BDO World Darts Championship. The final three places went to the three winners of a tournament between unqualified Tour Card holders, the winners being Benito van de Pas, Kevin Burness and Matthew Edgar.

Fifteen international qualifiers made their debuts; Danny Baggish, Keane Barry, Matt Campbell, Damon Heta, José Justicia, Robbie King, Nico Kurz, Benjamin Pratnemer, Madars Razma, Ben Robb, Callan Rydz, Fallon Sherrock, Mikuru Suzuki, Ciarán Teehan & Yuki Yamada. Razma was the first Latvian ever to qualify for the PDC World Championship.

== Summary ==
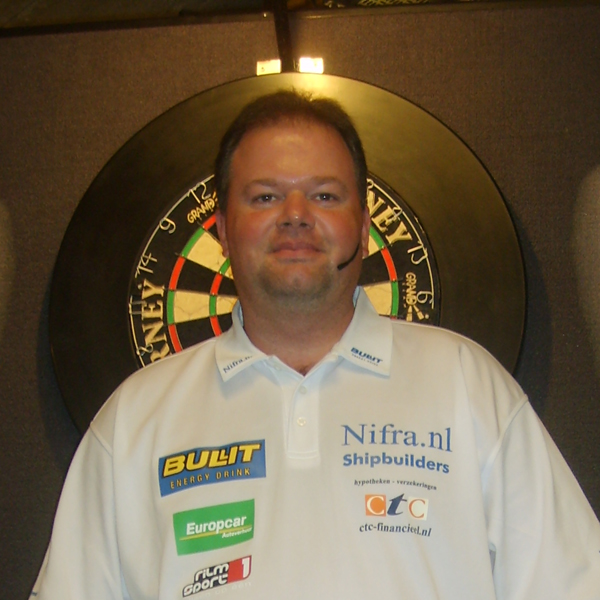
2007 champion Raymond van Barneveld (pictured in 2006) lost in the first round to Darin Young. He retired after the match, subsequently reversing the decision.

The top quarter of the draw saw number one seed & reigning champion Michael van Gerwen easily reach the quarter-final, recovering from losing the first set to Jelle Klaasen in the second round to win, before consecutive 4–0 victories over Ricky Evans and former BDO World Champion Stephen Bunting. Lithuanian Darius Labanauskas reached the quarter-final stage for the first time, knocking out seeds including world number 9 Ian White and former BDO Champion Steve Beaton. In the quarter-final, Van Gerwen triumphed over Labanauskas, 5–2, to qualify for the semi-final for the seventh time in eight championships.

In the second quarter, fourth seed and 2019 runner-up Michael Smith was eliminated in the second round following a 3–1 defeat to debutant Luke Woodhouse. Reigning UK Open champion Nathan Aspinall reached the quarter-final with wins over Krzysztof Ratajski and two-time World Champion Gary Anderson, while two-time World Youth Champion Dimitri Van den Bergh defeated Woodhouse and two-time World Champion Adrian Lewis to also reach the quarter-final. In that quarter-final, Aspinall won 5–3 to reach his second semi-final in two attempts at the World Championship.

In the third quarter, 2018 champion Rob Cross was an early exit, losing to Kim Huybrechts in the second round without winning a set. 2007 champion Raymond van Barneveld was another early faller, crashing out to American Darin Young 3–1 in the first round. Van Barneveld had planned to retire after this tournament, but after sitting out the 2020 season announced his intention to return for 2021. Reigning World Youth Champion Luke Humphries came through a sudden-death leg against Jermaine Wattimena in the second round before defeating Nico Kurz and Huybrechts to reach consecutive quarter-finals. 2014 runner-up Peter Wright survived a match dart at bullseye to win a sudden-death leg against Noel Malicdem in the second round, before beating Seigo Asada and Jeffrey de Zwaan to reach the quarter-finals, where he triumphed 5–3 over Humphries to reach the semi-final for the first time since the 2017 tournament.

In the fourth quarter, Fallon Sherrock defeated Ted Evetts in the first round, becoming the first female player to win a match at the World Championships, before following that win with a 3–1 victory over 11th seed Mensur Suljović in the second round. Sherrock's run, which PDC chairman Barry Hearn said could be the "dawn of a new era" for darts, was ended in the third round by Chris Dobey. Third seed Gerwyn Price beat John Henderson and Simon Whitlock to reach his first World Championship quarter-final, while three-time reigning BDO World Champion Glen Durrant joined him in the quarter-final on his PDC debut with wins over sixth seed Daryl Gurney and Dobey. In the quarter-final Price dominated Durrant, winning 5–1 to reach his first semi-final.

The first of the semi-finals, between Price and Wright, was a bad-tempered affair. Wright won the first set against the darts, tapping his opponent on the arm and making comments to him as they went off for the break. Price levelled the match after the second set and celebrated exuberantly. Each player won two of the next four sets before Wright won three sets in a row to win the match and reach the second world championship final of his career. There was no handshake between the two players after the match, and Price said on Twitter that he had thought Wright's actions after the first set were out of order; later apologizing for his remarks.

In the second semi-final, between Van Gerwen and Aspinall, the reigning champion took the first set against the darts, before Aspinall levelled in the second. Van Gerwen broke again in the third set only for Aspinall to win the fourth set in a decider. Aspinall missed a dart to win the fifth set and Van Gerwen took the lead again, before winning the sixth set 3–0 to take a two-set lead in the match. Aspinall won the seventh set, but Van Gerwen took the next two to secure his place in the final against Wright, a repeat of the 2014 PDC World Darts Championship final.

In the final, held on New Year's Day 2020, Wright held the first set with a 3–2 win after Van Gerwen missed bullseye for a set-winning 170 checkout. Wright then took a two-set lead with a 3–1 set win, before Van Gerwen broke back in the third set with a 3–0 win, and won the fourth by 3–2. Wright regained the lead in the fifth and then took a 3–0 win in the sixth set to go back to two legs clear. Again, Van Gerwen broke back with a 3–1 in the seventh; but Wright quickly regained the advantage, winning the eight set 3–2. Wright went one away from the win with a 3–2 win in the ninth set. In the tenth set, Wright won the first leg. Van Gerwen missed double-12 for a perfect nine-dart finish in the second leg, but took the leg regardless. Wright won the third leg to throw for the match; and took out double-10 to win the world championship for the first time.

== Schedule ==
Friday, 13 December

Game #	Round	Player 1	Score	Player 2	Set 1	Set 2	Set 3	Set 4	Set 5
01	1	(Netherlands) Jelle Klaasen	3 – 1	Kevin Burness (Northern Ireland)	2 – 3	3 – 1	3 – 1	3 – 1	—N/a
02	1	(Belgium) Kim Huybrechts	3 – 2	Geert Nentjes (Netherlands)	3 – 2	2 – 3	2 – 3	3 – 1	3 – 1
03	1	(England) Luke Humphries	3 – 1	Devon Petersen (South Africa)	3 – 2	2 – 3	3 – 2	3 – 1	—N/a
04	2	(Netherlands) Michael van Gerwen	3 – 1	Jelle Klaasen (Netherlands)	2 – 3	3 – 2	3 – 1	3 – 1	—N/a

Saturday, 14 December

Game #	Round	Player 1	Score	Player 2	Set 1	Set 2	Set 3	Set 4	Set 5
05	1	(Lithuania) Darius Labanauskas	3 – 0	Matthew Edgar (England)	3 – 0	3 – 0	3 – 2	—N/a	—N/a
06	1	(England) Ryan Meikle	1 – 3	Yuki Yamada (Japan)	3 – 2	2 – 3	2 – 3	1 – 3	—N/a
07	1	(England) Luke Woodhouse	3 – 0	Paul Lim (Singapore)	3 – 1	3 – 1	3 – 1	—N/a	—N/a
08	2	(Netherlands) Jermaine Wattimena	2 – 3	Luke Humphries (England)	3 – 0	1 – 3	3 – 1	1 – 3	5 – 6
09	1	(England) Mark McGeeney	3 – 1	Matt Campbell (Canada)	3 – 1	3 – 1	1 – 3	3 – 2	—N/a
10	1	(England) Jamie Hughes	2 – 3	Zoran Lerchbacher (Austria)	2 – 3	3 – 1	2 – 3	3 – 2	2 – 3
11	1	(Netherlands) Raymond van Barneveld	1 – 3	Darin Young (United States)	1 – 3	3 – 0	2 – 3	2 – 3	—N/a
12	2	(England) Rob Cross	0 – 3	Kim Huybrechts (Belgium)	1 – 3	0 – 3	1 – 3	—N/a	—N/a

Sunday, 15 December

Game #	Round	Player 1	Score	Player 2	Set 1	Set 2	Set 3	Set 4	Set 5
13	1	(Australia) Kyle Anderson	3 – 2	Xiaochen Zong (China)	2 – 3	1 – 3	3 – 1	3 – 1	3 – 1
14	1	(England) Ross Smith	0 – 3	Ciarán Teehan (Republic of Ireland)	2 – 3	2 – 3	1 – 3	—N/a	—N/a
15	1	(Northern Ireland) Brendan Dolan	3 – 0	Nitin Kumar (India)	3 – 2	3 – 1	3 – 1	—N/a	—N/a
16	2	(England) Ian White	1 – 3	Darius Labanauskas (Lithuania)	2 – 3	3 – 0	2 – 3	1 – 3	—N/a
17	1	(England) Arron Monk	0 – 3	José Justicia	1 – 3	2 – 3	0 – 3	—N/a	—N/a
18	1	(England) Andy Boulton	2 – 3	Danny Baggish (United States)	3 – 2	2 – 3	3 – 2	2 – 3	1 – 3
19	1	(England) James Richardson	3 – 2	Mikuru Suzuki (Japan)	3 – 2	3 – 0	2 – 3	1 – 3	3 – 2
20	2	(England) Michael Smith	1 – 3	Luke Woodhouse (England)	1 – 3	1 – 3	3 – 2	2 – 3	—N/a

Monday, 16 December

Game #	Round	Player 1	Score	Player 2	Set 1	Set 2	Set 3	Set 4	Set 5
21	1	(Republic of Ireland) Steve Lennon	2 – 3	Callan Rydz (England)	3 – 0	0 – 3	0 – 3	3 – 0	2 – 3
22	1	(Republic of Ireland) William O'Connor	3 – 0	Marko Kantele (Finland)	3 – 1	3 – 1	3 – 1	—N/a	—N/a
23	1	(Netherlands) Vincent van der Voort	3 – 0	Keane Barry (Republic of Ireland)	3 – 2	3 – 2	3 – 1	—N/a	—N/a
24	2	(Scotland) Gary Anderson	3 – 0	Brendan Dolan (Northern Ireland)	3 – 0	3 – 1	3 – 0	—N/a	—N/a

Tuesday, 17 December

Game #	Round	Player 1	Score	Player 2	Set 1	Set 2	Set 3	Set 4	Set 5
25	1	(England) Ryan Searle	3 – 2	Robbie King (Australia)	2 – 3	3 – 1	2 – 3	3 – 1	3 – 2
26	1	(Spain) Cristo Reyes	3 – 2	Lourence Ilagan (Philippines)	2 – 3	1 – 3	3 – 2	3 – 1	3 – 0
27	1	(Austria) Rowby-John Rodriguez	0 – 3	Noel Malicdem (Philippines)	1 – 3	2 – 3	0 – 3	—N/a	—N/a
28	2	(Poland) Krzysztof Ratajski	3 – 1	Zoran Lerchbacher (Austria)	2 – 3	3 – 2	3 – 2	3 – 1	—N/a
29	1	(England) Ritchie Edhouse	3 – 1	Boris Koltsov (Russia)	3 – 1	3 – 1	2 – 3	3 – 2	—N/a
30	1	(Portugal) José de Sousa	0 – 3	Damon Heta (Australia)	2 – 3	2 – 3	2 – 3	—N/a	—N/a
31	1	(England) Ted Evetts	2 – 3	Fallon Sherrock (England)	3 – 1	1 – 3	3 – 2	2 – 3	1 – 3
32	2	(Netherlands) Jeffrey de Zwaan	3 – 2	Darin Young (United States)	1 – 3	3 – 0	2 – 3	3 – 2	3 – 1

Wednesday, 18 December

Game #	Round	Player 1	Score	Player 2	Set 1	Set 2	Set 3	Set 4	Set 5
33	1	(Netherlands) Ron Meulenkamp	3 – 0	Ben Robb (New Zealand)	3 – 2	3 – 0	3 – 2	—N/a	—N/a
34	1	(Northern Ireland) Mickey Mansell	0 – 3	Seigo Asada (Japan)	2 – 3	1 – 3	0 – 3	—N/a	—N/a
35	1	(England) Harry Ward	3 – 2	Madars Razma (Latvia)	3 – 0	0 – 3	0 – 3	3 – 2	3 – 0
36	2	(England) Stephen Bunting	3 – 2	José Justicia	1 – 3	3 – 1	3 – 2	1 – 3	6 – 4
37	1	(England) James Wilson	1 – 3	Nico Kurz (Germany)	0 – 3	1 – 3	3 – 1	0 – 3	—N/a
38	1	(England) Josh Payne	3 – 0	Diogo Portela (Brazil)	3 – 0	3 – 2	3 – 0	—N/a	—N/a
39	1	(Germany) Gabriel Clemens	2 – 3	Benito van de Pas (Netherlands)	2 – 3	3 – 0	1 – 3	3 – 1	2 – 3
40	2	(England) James Wade	3 – 0	Ritchie Edhouse (England)	3 – 2	3 – 1	3 – 2	—N/a	—N/a

Thursday, 19 December

Game #	Round	Player 1	Score	Player 2	Set 1	Set 2	Set 3	Set 4	Set 5
41	1	(England) Justin Pipe	3 – 2	Benjamin Pratnemer (Slovenia)	2 – 3	3 – 1	1 – 3	3 – 2	3 – 1
42	1	(England) Ryan Joyce	2 – 3	Jan Dekker (Netherlands)	1 – 3	1 – 3	3 – 1	3 – 1	2 – 3
43	2	(Scotland) John Henderson	3 – 0	James Richardson (England)	3 – 2	3 – 1	3 – 0	—N/a	—N/a
44	2	(England) Steve Beaton	3 – 1	Kyle Anderson (Australia)	3 – 1	2 – 3	3 – 0	3 – 2	—N/a
45	2	(England) Chris Dobey	3 – 2	Ron Meulenkamp (Netherlands)	3 – 1	3 – 1	0 – 3	1 – 3	4 – 2
46	2	(Netherlands) Danny Noppert	3 – 2	Callan Rydz (England)	2 – 3	3 – 2	2 – 3	3 – 0	3 – 1
47	2	(England) Dave Chisnall	3 – 1	Vincent van der Voort (Netherlands)	3 – 2	3 – 1	0 – 3	3 – 1	—N/a
48	2	(Wales) Gerwyn Price	3 – 2	William O'Connor (Republic of Ireland)	3 – 2	1 – 3	1 – 3	3 – 2	4 – 2

Friday, 20 December

Game #	Round	Player 1	Score	Player 2	Set 1	Set 2	Set 3	Set 4	Set 5
49	2	(England) Darren Webster	3 – 0	Yuki Yamada (Japan)	3 – 1	3 – 0	3 – 0	—N/a	—N/a
50	2	(England) Mervyn King	3 – 2	Ciarán Teehan (Republic of Ireland)	3 – 0	3 – 1	1 – 3	2 – 3	4 – 2
51	2	(Wales) Jonny Clayton	3 – 0	Jan Dekker (Netherlands)	3 – 2	3 – 1	3 – 0	—N/a	—N/a
52	2	(England) Ricky Evans	3 – 1	Mark McGeeney (England)	3 – 0	3 – 0	2 – 3	3 – 0	—N/a
53	2	(England) Nathan Aspinall	3 – 1	Danny Baggish (United States)	1 – 3	3 – 0	3 – 2	3 – 2	—N/a
54	2	(England) Joe Cullen	1 – 3	Nico Kurz (Germany)	3 – 2	2 – 3	1 – 3	2 – 3	—N/a
55	2	(Germany) Max Hopp	3 – 2	Benito van de Pas (Netherlands)	3 – 2	1 – 3	3 – 2	1 – 3	3 – 0
56	2	(Scotland) Peter Wright	3 – 2	Noel Malicdem (Philippines)	3 – 0	2 – 3	3 – 1	2 – 3	6 – 5

Saturday, 21 December

Game #	Round	Player 1	Score	Player 2	Set 1	Set 2	Set 3	Set 4	Set 5
57	2	(England) Keegan Brown	2 – 3	Seigo Asada (Japan)	3 – 0	3 – 0	1 – 3	1 – 3	2 – 4
58	2	(Australia) Simon Whitlock	3 – 0	Harry Ward (England)	3 – 1	3 – 0	3 – 1	—N/a	—N/a
59	2	(England) Steve West	0 – 3	Ryan Searle (England)	2 – 3	2 – 3	2 – 3	—N/a	—N/a
60	2	(England) Adrian Lewis	3 – 2	Cristo Reyes (Spain)	2 – 3	1 – 3	3 – 1	3 – 1	5 – 3
61	2	(Northern Ireland) Daryl Gurney	3 – 0	Justin Pipe (England)	3 – 1	3 – 0	3 – 1	—N/a	—N/a
62	2	(England) Glen Durrant	3 – 0	Damon Heta (Australia)	3 – 0	3 – 1	3 – 2	—N/a	—N/a
63	2	(Austria) Mensur Suljović	1 – 3	Fallon Sherrock (England)	2 – 3	3 – 2	2 – 3	2 – 3	—N/a
64	2	(Belgium) Dimitri Van den Bergh	3 – 0	Josh Payne (England)	3 – 2	3 – 0	3 – 2	—N/a	—N/a

Sunday, 22 December

Game #	Round	Player 1	Score	Player 2	Set 1	Set 2	Set 3	Set 4	Set 5	Set 6	Set 7
65	3	(Wales) Jonny Clayton	0 – 4	Stephen Bunting (England)	0 – 3	2 – 3	1 – 3	2 – 3	—N/a	—N/a	—N/a
66	3	(Lithuania) Darius Labanauskas	4 – 2	Max Hopp (Germany)	1 – 3	3 – 1	1 – 3	3 – 1	3 – 0	3 – 2	—N/a
67	3	(England) Nathan Aspinall	4 – 3	Krzysztof Ratajski (Poland)	3 – 1	2 – 3	3 – 1	3 – 2	2 – 3	2 – 3	3 – 0
68	3	(England) James Wade	2 – 4	Steve Beaton (England)	1 – 3	2 – 3	3 – 2	1 – 3	3 – 0	1 – 3	—N/a
69	3	(Belgium) Kim Huybrechts	4 – 2	Danny Noppert (Netherlands)	1 – 3	3 – 2	1 – 3	3 – 1	3 – 1	3 – 0	—N/a
70	3	(Netherlands) Michael van Gerwen	4 – 0	Ricky Evans (England)	3 – 2	3 – 1	3 – 2	3 – 2	—N/a	—N/a	—N/a

Monday, 23 December

Game #	Round	Player 1	Score	Player 2	Set 1	Set 2	Set 3	Set 4	Set 5	Set 6	Set 7
71	3	(Germany) Nico Kurz	2 – 4	Luke Humphries (England)	1 – 3	3 – 2	3 – 1	0 – 3	2 – 3	1 – 3	—N/a
72	3	(England) Adrian Lewis	4 – 3	Darren Webster (England)	2 – 3	1 – 3	3 – 2	3 – 2	2 – 3	3 – 2	4 – 2
73	3	(England) Luke Woodhouse	2 – 4	Dimitri Van den Bergh (Belgium)	1 − 3	1 – 3	3 – 1	2 – 3	3 – 1	2 – 3	—N/a
74	3	(England) Dave Chisnall	3 – 4	Jeffrey de Zwaan (Netherlands)	1 – 3	3 – 2	0 – 3	3 – 0	1 – 3	3 – 1	0 – 3
75	3	(Scotland) Gary Anderson	4 – 3	Ryan Searle (England)	3 – 2	1 – 3	1 – 3	1 – 3	3 – 1	3 – 1	3 – 0
76	3	(Scotland) Peter Wright	4 – 2	Seigo Asada (Japan)	3 – 2	2 – 3	3 – 1	3 – 2	2 – 3	3 – 1	—N/a

Friday, 27 December

Game #	Round	Player 1	Score	Player 2	Set 1	Set 2	Set 3	Set 4	Set 5	Set 6	Set 7
77	3	(Australia) Simon Whitlock	4 – 1	Mervyn King (England)	0 – 3	3 – 2	3 – 2	3 – 0	3 – 2	—N/a	—N/a
78	3	(Northern Ireland) Daryl Gurney	2 – 4	Glen Durrant (England)	1 – 3	3 – 1	2 – 3	3 – 1	2 – 3	2 – 3	—N/a
79	3	(England) Fallon Sherrock	2 – 4	Chris Dobey (England)	3 – 1	2 – 3	3 – 1	0 – 3	1 – 3	0 – 3	—N/a
80	3	(Wales) Gerwyn Price	4 – 0	John Henderson (Scotland)	3 – 1	3 – 1	3 – 1	3 – 1	—N/a	—N/a	—N/a
81	4	(Scotland) Gary Anderson	2 – 4	Nathan Aspinall (England)	3 – 2	2 – 3	2 – 3	3 – 2	2 – 3	1 – 3	—N/a
82	4	(Netherlands) Michael van Gerwen	4 – 0	Stephen Bunting (England)	3 – 2	3 – 0	3 – 1	3 – 1	—N/a	—N/a	—N/a

Saturday, 28 December

Game #	Round	Player 1	Score	Player 2	Set 1	Set 2	Set 3	Set 4	Set 5	Set 6	Set 7
83	4	(England) Steve Beaton	2 – 4	Darius Labanauskas (Lithuania)	2 – 3	3 – 2	1 – 3	3 – 0	0 – 3	1 – 3	—N/a
84	4	(Belgium) Kim Huybrechts	1 – 4	Luke Humphries (England)	3 – 2	0 – 3	2 – 3	1 – 3	0 – 3	—N/a	—N/a
85	4	(Belgium) Dimitri Van den Bergh	4 – 3	Adrian Lewis (England)	1 – 3	1 – 3	3 – 1	2 – 3	3 – 1	3 – 1	3 – 1
86	4	(Scotland) Peter Wright	4 – 3	Jeffrey de Zwaan (Netherlands)	3 – 2	3 – 1	3 – 0	2 – 3	1 – 3	2 – 3	5 – 3
87	4	(England) Glen Durrant	4 – 3	Chris Dobey (England)	1 – 3	3 – 0	3 – 2	3 – 2	1 – 3	1 – 3	3 – 0
88	4	(Wales) Gerwyn Price	4 – 2	Simon Whitlock (Australia)	3 – 2	3 – 1	0 – 3	3 – 1	0 – 3	3 – 0	—N/a

Sunday, 29 December

Game #	Round	Player 1	Score	Player 2	Set 1	Set 2	Set 3	Set 4	Set 5	Set 6	Set 7	Set 8	Set 9
89	QF	(England) Nathan Aspinall	5 – 3	Dimitri Van den Bergh (Belgium)	0 – 3	3 – 1	3 – 1	3 – 2	3 – 2	2 – 3	1 – 3	3 – 2	—N/a
90	QF	(England) Luke Humphries	3 – 5	Peter Wright (Scotland)	1 – 3	0 – 3	3 – 2	1 – 3	1 – 3	3 – 1	3 – 0	1 – 3	—N/a
91	QF	(Netherlands) Michael van Gerwen	5 – 2	Darius Labanauskas (Lithuania)	2 – 3	3 – 2	3 – 0	3 – 1	1 – 3	3 – 0	3 – 2	—N/a	—N/a
92	QF	(England) Glen Durrant	1 – 5	Gerwyn Price (Wales)	2 – 3	1 – 3	3 – 1	1 – 3	1 – 3	1 – 3	—N/a	—N/a	—N/a

Monday, 30 December

Game #	Round	Player 1	Score	Player 2	Set 1	Set 2	Set 3	Set 4	Set 5	Set 6	Set 7	Set 8	Set 9	Set 10	Set 11
93	SF	(Scotland) Peter Wright	6 – 3	Gerwyn Price (Wales)	3 – 2	2 – 3	1 – 3	3 – 0	3 – 2	1 – 3	3 – 2	3 – 1	3 – 2	—N/a	—N/a
94	SF	(Netherlands) Michael van Gerwen	6 – 3	Nathan Aspinall (England)	3 – 2	1 – 3	3 – 2	2 – 3	3 – 2	3 – 0	0 – 3	3 – 2	3 – 1	—N/a	—N/a

Wednesday, 1 January

Game #	Round	Player 1	Score	Player 2	Set 1	Set 2	Set 3	Set 4	Set 5	Set 6	Set 7	Set 8	Set 9	Set 10	Set 11	Set 12	Set 13
95	F	(Netherlands) Michael van Gerwen	3 – 7	Peter Wright (Scotland)	2 – 3	1 – 3	3 – 0	3 – 2	1 – 3	0 – 3	3 – 1	2 – 3	2 – 3	1 – 3	—N/a	—N/a	—N/a

== Draw ==
The draw took place on 25 November 2019 on Sky Sports News.

=== Finals ===
Quarter-finals (best of 9 sets); 29 December
1	(Netherlands) Michael van Gerwen 99.50	5
(Lithuania) Darius Labanauskas 90.25	2
12	(England) Nathan Aspinall 95.31	5
29	(Belgium) Dimitri Van den Bergh 91.12	3
(England) Luke Humphries 98.65	3
7	(Scotland) Peter Wright 105.86	5
27	(England) Glen Durrant 94.42	1
3	(Wales) Gerwyn Price 99.69	5

Semi-finals (best of 11 sets); 30 December
1	(Netherlands) Michael van Gerwen 96.34	6
12	(England) Nathan Aspinall 92.04	3
7	(Scotland) Peter Wright 98.39	6
3	(Wales) Gerwyn Price 89.94	3

Final (best of 13 sets); 1 January
1	(Netherlands) Michael van Gerwen 102.88	3
7	(Scotland) Peter Wright 102.79	7

=== Top half ===
==== Section 1 ====
First round (best of 5 sets); 13–19 December
(Netherlands) Jelle Klaasen 96.02	3
(Northern Ireland) Kevin Burness 92.41	1
(England) Mark McGeeney 93.66	3
(Canada) Matt Campbell 88.33	1
(England) Ryan Joyce 83.37	2
(Netherlands) Jan Dekker 84.07	3
(England) Arron Monk 82.56	0
José Justicia 88.64	3
(England) Ritchie Edhouse 87.83	3
(Russia) Boris Koltsov 84.53	1
(Australia) Kyle Anderson 89.56	3
(China) Xiaochen Zong 83.16	2
(Lithuania) Darius Labanauskas 94.73	3
(England) Matthew Edgar 84.78	0
(Germany) Gabriel Clemens 93.57	2
(Netherlands) Benito van de Pas 88.64	3

Second round (best of 5 sets); 13–21 December
1	(Netherlands) Michael van Gerwen 96.28	3
(Netherlands) Jelle Klaasen 95.06	1
32	(England) Ricky Evans 95.46	3
(England) Mark McGeeney 87.10	1
16	(Wales) Jonny Clayton 95.16	3
(Netherlands) Jan Dekker 85.10	0
17	(England) Stephen Bunting 93.49	3
José Justicia 91.87	2
8	(England) James Wade 92.43	3
(England) Ritchie Edhouse 93.48	0
25	(England) Steve Beaton 91.92	3
(Australia) Kyle Anderson 89.31	1
9	(England) Ian White 100.33	1
(Lithuania) Darius Labanauskas 96.31	3
24	(Germany) Max Hopp 90.03	3
(Netherlands) Benito van de Pas 84.73	2

Third round (best of 7 sets); 22–27 December
1	(Netherlands) Michael van Gerwen 96.75	4
32	(England) Ricky Evans 95.81	0
16	(Wales) Jonny Clayton 91.49	0
17	(England) Stephen Bunting 95.70	4
8	(England) James Wade 94.56	2
25	(England) Steve Beaton 92.95	4
(Lithuania) Darius Labanauskas 91.03	4
24	(Germany) Max Hopp 92.16	2

Fourth round (best of 7 sets); 27–28 December
1	(Netherlands) Michael van Gerwen 104.09	4
17	(England) Stephen Bunting 84.71	0
25	(England) Steve Beaton 90.44	2
(Lithuania) Darius Labanauskas 94.25	4

Quarter-finals (best of 9 sets); 29 December
1	(Netherlands) Michael van Gerwen 99.50	5
(Lithuania) Darius Labanauskas 90.25	2

==== Section 2 ====
First round (best of 5 sets); 13–19 December
(Northern Ireland) Brendan Dolan 97.35	3
(India) Nitin Kumar 90.17	0
(England) Ryan Searle 87.00	3
(Australia) Robbie King 80.50	2
(England) Andy Boulton 85.12	2
(United States) Danny Baggish 84.94	3
(England) Jamie Hughes 95.47	2
(Austria) Zoran Lerchbacher 94.22	3
(England) Luke Woodhouse 96.02	3
(Singapore) Paul Lim 93.14	0
(England) Josh Payne 96.49	3
(Brazil) Diogo Portela 90.46	0
(Spain) Cristo Reyes 85.62	3
(Philippines) Lourence Ilagan 84.36	2
(England) Ryan Meikle 81.00	1
(Japan) Yuki Yamada 85.77	3

Second round (best of 5 sets); 13–21 December
5	(Scotland) Gary Anderson 93.77	3
(Northern Ireland) Brendan Dolan 90.96	0
28	(England) Steve West 95.12	0
(England) Ryan Searle 101.54	3
12	(England) Nathan Aspinall 95.38	3
(United States) Danny Baggish 90.92	1
21	(Poland) Krzysztof Ratajski 91.35	3
(Austria) Zoran Lerchbacher 92.30	1
4	(England) Michael Smith 95.69	1
(England) Luke Woodhouse 97.81	3
29	(Belgium) Dimitri Van den Bergh 103.81	3
(England) Josh Payne 97.52	0
13	(England) Adrian Lewis 90.46	3
(Spain) Cristo Reyes 89.86	2
20	(England) Darren Webster 91.28	3
(Japan) Yuki Yamada 82.34	0

Third round (best of 7 sets); 22–27 December
5	(Scotland) Gary Anderson 99.85	4
(England) Ryan Searle 95.15	3
12	(England) Nathan Aspinall 98.45	4
21	(Poland) Krzysztof Ratajski 97.00	3
(England) Luke Woodhouse 90.41	2
29	(Belgium) Dimitri Van den Bergh 94.21	4
13	(England) Adrian Lewis 93.74	4
20	(England) Darren Webster 92.40	3

Fourth round (best of 7 sets); 27–28 December
5	(Scotland) Gary Anderson 97.42	2
12	(England) Nathan Aspinall 97.97	4
29	(Belgium) Dimitri Van den Bergh 96.06	4
13	(England) Adrian Lewis 93.70	3

Quarter-finals (best of 9 sets); 29 December
12	(England) Nathan Aspinall 95.31	5
29	(Belgium) Dimitri Van den Bergh 91.12	3

=== Bottom half ===
==== Section 3 ====
First round (best of 5 sets); 13–19 December
(Belgium) Kim Huybrechts 89.94	3
(Netherlands) Geert Nentjes 87.03	2
(Republic of Ireland) Steve Lennon 91.92	2
(England) Callan Rydz 89.28	3
(England) James Wilson 89.89	1
(Germany) Nico Kurz 95.67	3
(England) Luke Humphries 91.05	3
(South Africa) Devon Petersen 92.60	1
(Austria) Rowby-John Rodriguez 81.34	0
(Philippines) Noel Malicdem 85.07	3
(Northern Ireland) Mickey Mansell 80.15	0
(Japan) Seigo Asada 91.97	3
(Netherlands) Vincent van der Voort 95.79	3
(Republic of Ireland) Keane Barry 91.72	0
(Netherlands) Raymond van Barneveld 96.13	1
(United States) Darin Young 87.92	3

Second round (best of 5 sets); 13–21 December
2	(England) Rob Cross 89.64	0
(Belgium) Kim Huybrechts 89.44	3
31	(Netherlands) Danny Noppert 92.85	3
(England) Callan Rydz 87.09	2
15	(England) Joe Cullen 92.47	1
(Germany) Nico Kurz 93.05	3
18	(Netherlands) Jermaine Wattimena 95.14	2
(England) Luke Humphries 97.70	3
7	(Scotland) Peter Wright 96.53	3
(Philippines) Noel Malicdem 93.77	2
26	(England) Keegan Brown 90.99	2
(Japan) Seigo Asada 91.96	3
10	(England) Dave Chisnall 93.10	3
(Netherlands) Vincent van der Voort 91.99	1
23	(Netherlands) Jeffrey de Zwaan 93.47	3
(United States) Darin Young 90.59	2

Third round (best of 7 sets); 22–27 December
(Belgium) Kim Huybrechts 95.84	4
31	(Netherlands) Danny Noppert 91.58	2
(Germany) Nico Kurz 96.16	2
(England) Luke Humphries 94.80	4
7	(Scotland) Peter Wright 94.42	4
(Japan) Seigo Asada 95.56	2
10	(England) Dave Chisnall 101.75	3
23	(Netherlands) Jeffrey de Zwaan 106.09	4

Fourth round (best of 7 sets); 27–28 December
(Belgium) Kim Huybrechts 89.11	1
(England) Luke Humphries 95.11	4
7	(Scotland) Peter Wright 96.39	4
23	(Netherlands) Jeffrey de Zwaan 94.80	3

Quarter-finals (best of 9 sets); 29 December
(England) Luke Humphries 98.65	3
7	(Scotland) Peter Wright 105.86	5

==== Section 4 ====
First round (best of 5 sets); 13–19 December
(England) Justin Pipe 92.26	3
(Slovenia) Benjamin Pratnemer 87.45	2
(Portugal) José de Sousa 90.01	0
(Australia) Damon Heta 93.89	3
(England) Ted Evetts 91.50	2
(England) Fallon Sherrock 91.12	3
(Netherlands) Ron Meulenkamp 91.90	3
(New Zealand) Ben Robb 88.36	0
(Republic of Ireland) William O'Connor 88.23	3
(Finland) Marko Kantele 83.91	0
(England) James Richardson 85.78	3
(Japan) Mikuru Suzuki 84.91	2
(England) Harry Ward 84.04	3
(Latvia) Madars Razma 83.12	2
(England) Ross Smith 87.67	0
(Republic of Ireland) Ciarán Teehan 90.08	3

Second round (best of 5 sets); 13–21 December
6	(Northern Ireland) Daryl Gurney 96.02	3
(England) Justin Pipe 90.41	0
27	(England) Glen Durrant 95.36	3
(Australia) Damon Heta 87.63	0
11	(Austria) Mensur Suljović 92.31	1
(England) Fallon Sherrock 90.67	3
22	(England) Chris Dobey 96.33	3
(Netherlands) Ron Meulenkamp 94.71	2
3	(Wales) Gerwyn Price 90.98	3
(Republic of Ireland) William O'Connor 93.22	2
30	(Scotland) John Henderson 93.34	3
(England) James Richardson 83.77	0
14	(Australia) Simon Whitlock 93.87	3
(England) Harry Ward 84.74	0
19	(England) Mervyn King 88.36	3
(Republic of Ireland) Ciarán Teehan 86.40	2

Third round (best of 7 sets); 22–27 December
6	(Northern Ireland) Daryl Gurney 96.84	2
27	(England) Glen Durrant 97.94	4
(England) Fallon Sherrock 90.45	2
22	(England) Chris Dobey 101.09	4
3	(Wales) Gerwyn Price 104.20	4
30	(Scotland) John Henderson 94.59	0
14	(Australia) Simon Whitlock 90.94	4
19	(England) Mervyn King 89.51	1

Fourth round (best of 7 sets); 27–28 December
27	(England) Glen Durrant 94.16	4
22	(England) Chris Dobey 94.01	3
3	(Wales) Gerwyn Price 92.47	4
14	(Australia) Simon Whitlock 90.85	2

Quarter-finals (best of 9 sets); 29 December
27	(England) Glen Durrant 94.42	1
3	(Wales) Gerwyn Price 99.69	5

== Final ==
Final: Best of 13 sets. Referee: Russ Bray; Alexandra Palace, London, England, 1 January 2020.
(1) Michael van Gerwen (Netherlands)	3 – 7	(Scotland) Peter Wright (7)
2–3, 1–3, 3–0, 3–2, 1–3, 0–3, 3–1, 2–3, 2–3, 1–3
102.88	Average (3 darts)	102.79
42	100+ scores	62
24	140+ scores	34
16	180 scores	11
128	Highest checkout	140
2	100+ Checkouts	1
40.00% (18/45)	Checkout summary	53.33% (24/45)

== Statistics ==
Player	Eliminated	Played	Sets Won	Sets Lost	Legs Won	Legs Lost	100+	140+	180s	High checkout	Checkout Av.%	Average (Note: Please note this is not calculated properly for players playing more than one match and is not indicative of actual tournament averages.)
Peter Wright	Winner	6	29	16	115	88	261	153	66	170	44.39	99.18
Michael van Gerwen	Runner up	6	25	13	92	65	183	98	43	170	43.53	99.29
Nathan Aspinall	Semi-final	5	19	15	80	71	185	104	44	124	38.46	96.87
Gerwyn Price	Semi-final	5	19	11	70	57	139	78	30	136	40.94	95.46
Dimitri Van den Bergh	Quarter-final	4	14	10	56	47	121	68	28	128	40.29	95.83
Glen Durrant	Quarter-final	4	12	10	47	45	101	57	19	170	43.52	95.49
Luke Humphries	Quarter-final	5	17	11	66	55	148	82	38	160	44.30	95.46
Darius Labanauskas	Quarter-final	5	16	10	57	50	130	64	19	114	39.58	93.30
Jeffrey de Zwaan	Fourth round	3	10	9	42	39	96	65	19	98	45.65	98.12
Gary Anderson	Fourth round	3	9	7	37	33	83	54	18	170	37.00	97.01
Chris Dobey	Fourth round	3	10	8	38	34	71	56	25	110	36.67	96.90
Adrian Lewis	Fourth round	3	10	9	45	45	105	53	19	138	39.13	92.63
Simon Whitlock	Fourth round	3	9	5	31	23	64	31	14	148	39.13	91.89
Steve Beaton	Fourth round	3	9	6	35	31	68	34	18	170	51.85	91.77
Stephen Bunting	Fourth round	3	7	6	30	30	72	29	16	148	38.46	91.30
Kim Huybrechts	Fourth round	4	11	8	42	36	101	45	10	164	45.83	91.08
Dave Chisnall	Third round	2	6	5	20	22	54	24	14	161	50.00	97.42
Daryl Gurney	Third round	2	5	4	22	16	43	29	8	87	45.83	96.43
Ricky Evans	Third round	2	3	5	18	15	44	24	6	170	46.15	95.65
Nico Kurz	Third round	3	8	6	31	27	83	50	7	131	40.00	95.00
Ryan Searle	Third round	3	9	6	35	31	72	43	23	170	36.11	94.56
Krzysztof Ratajski	Third round	2	6	5	24	26	70	27	7	123	34.29	94.18
John Henderson	Third round	2	3	4	13	17	38	24	6	102	26.53	93.97
James Wade	Third round	2	5	4	20	19	61	31	3	125	41.67	93.50
Jonny Clayton	Third round	2	3	4	14	15	41	17	6	138	51.85	93.33
Seigo Asada	Third round	3	9	6	31	29	78	38	6	130	38.71	93.16
Darren Webster	Third round	2	6	4	26	19	57	32	8	142	44.74	92.40
Danny Noppert	Third round	2	5	6	23	23	53	25	8	110	46.00	92.22
Max Hopp	Third round	2	5	6	21	24	62	36	7	148	38.18	91.10
Fallon Sherrock	Third round	3	8	7	33	33	79	45	18	142	51.61	90.75
Luke Woodhouse	Third round	3	8	5	32	24	77	37	12	126	35.29	90.41
Mervyn King	Third round	2	4	4	18	13	41	19	6	106	45.83	88.94
Ian White	Second round	1	1	3	8	9	15	12	8	136	57.14	100.33
Josh Payne	Second round	2	3	3	14	13	32	15	3	130	44.82	97.02
Michael Smith	Second round	1	1	3	7	11	27	13	2	82	25.93	95.69
Jelle Klaasen	Second round	2	4	4	19	18	38	13	9	152	50.00	95.54
Jermaine Wattimena	Second round	1	2	3	13	13	36	14	3	110	36.43	95.14
Steve West	Second round	1	0	3	6	9	16	14	3	120	35.29	95.12
Brendan Dolan	Second round	2	3	3	10	13	41	14	1	110	45.45	94.16
Vincent van der Voort	Second round	2	4	4	16	14	38	21	6	96	32.65	93.89
Zoran Lerchbacher	Second round	2	4	5	20	23	74	26	10	131	28.57	93.36
Ron Meulenkamp	Second round	2	5	3	19	15	42	22	11	120	33.33	93.31
Mensur Suljović	Second round	1	1	3	9	11	23	16	4	71	33.33	92.31
Joe Cullen	Second round	1	1	3	8	11	20	12	2	116	42.11	92.17
Justin Pipe	Second round	2	3	5	14	19	44	15	4	118	35.00	91.34
Keegan Brown	Second round	1	2	3	10	10	23	9	5	99	37.04	90.99
Damon Heta	Second round	2	3	5	12	12	48	7	3	100	30.00	90.76
William O'Connor	Second round	2	5	3	21	15	37	20	14	128	37.50	90.73
Ritchie Edhouse	Second round	2	3	4	16	16	40	26	5	106	28.57	90.66
Mark McGeeney	Second round	2	4	4	13	18	37	20	4	126	38.24	90.38
José Justicia	Second round	2	5	3	22	17	51	31	3	128	42.31	90.26
Rob Cross	Second round	1	0	3	2	9	15	5	3	36	15.38	89.64
Kyle Anderson	Second round	2	4	5	18	20	51	21	11	142	28.57	89.44
Noel Malicdem	Second round	2	5	3	21	19	50	24	10	107	39.62	89.42
Darin Young	Second round	2	5	4	18	20	47	28	11	160	40.00	89.26
Ciarán Teehan	Second round	2	5	3	18	17	27	22	11	91	33.33	88.24
Callan Rydz	Second round	2	5	5	18	21	38	22	8	160	38.30	88.19
Danny Baggish	Second round	2	4	5	20	21	49	28	6	100	42.55	87.93
Cristo Reyes	Second round	2	5	5	23	23	43	23	12	80	30.67	87.74
Benito van de Pas	Second round	2	5	5	20	22	47	21	6	158	39.22	86.69
James Richardson	Second round	2	3	5	15	19	36	25	5	106	32.61	84.78
Jan Dekker	Second round	2	3	4	14	19	33	16	5	118	32.56	84.59
Harry Ward	Second round	2	3	5	11	17	28	18	4	76	42.31	84.39
Yuki Yamada	Second round	2	3	4	12	17	32	18	2	124	26.09	84.06
Raymond van Barneveld	First round	1	1	3	8	9	17	16	5	96	30.77	96.13
Jamie Hughes	First round	1	2	3	12	12	24	22	5	130	38.71	95.47
Gabriel Clemens	First round	1	2	3	11	10	29	14	5	106	31.43	93.57
Paul Lim	First round	1	0	3	3	9	9	8	5	160	42.86	93.14
Devon Petersen	First round	1	1	3	8	12	25	17	5	94	28.57	92.60
Kevin Burness	First round	1	1	3	6	9	31	9	2	102	37.5	92.41
Steve Lennon	First round	1	2	3	8	9	17	16	4	128	25.00	91.92
Keane Barry	First round	1	0	3	5	9	19	15	3	72	33.33	91.72
Ted Evetts	First round	1	2	3	12	13	24	16	4	86	33.33	90.50
Diogo Portela	First round	1	0	3	2	9	12	9	0	51	66.67	90.46
Nitin Kumar	First round	1	0	3	4	9	15	11	3	80	66.67	90.14
José de Sousa	First round	1	0	3	9	21	9	0	3	84	34.29	90.01
James Wilson	First round	1	1	3	4	10	13	10	4	101	15.38	89.89
Ben Robb	First round	1	0	3	4	9	14	8	2	170	30.77	88.36
Matt Campbell	First round	1	1	3	7	10	16	3	3	147	41.18	88.33
Ross Smith	First round	1	0	3	5	9	16	7	5	154	25.00	87.67
Benjamin Pratnemer	First round	1	2	3	10	12	36	12	2	100	37.45	87.45
Geert Nentjes	First round	1	2	3	10	12	26	10	5	111	32.26	87.03
Andy Boulton	First round	1	2	3	11	13	23	9	9	130	44.00	85.12
Mikuru Suzuki	First round	1	2	3	10	12	40	15	2	151	33.33	84.91
Matthew Edgar	First round	1	0	3	2	9	14	3	0	75	40.00	84.78
Boris Koltsov	First round	1	1	3	7	11	20	10	2	85	31.82	84.53
Lourence Ilagan	First round	1	2	3	9	12	22	14	3	96	30.00	84.36
Marko Kantele	First round	1	0	3	3	9	16	8	1	52	20.00	83.91
Ryan Joyce	First round	1	2	3	10	11	22	9	3	116	27.03	83.37
Xiaochen Zong	First round	1	2	3	9	12	25	9	2	80	32.14	83.16
Madars Razma	First round	1	2	3	8	9	13	7	3	105	36.36	83.12
Arron Monk	First round	1	0	3	3	9	12	10	0	74	23.08	82.56
Rowby-John Rodriguez	First round	1	0	3	3	9	17	2	1	80	14.29	81.34
Ryan Meikle	First round	1	1	3	8	11	18	10	2	102	28.57	81.00
Robbie King	First round	1	2	3	11	13	20	9	5	77	34.48	80.50
Mickey Mansell	First round	1	0	3	3	9	18	3	1	120	30.00	80.15

== Top averages ==
This table shows the highest averages achieved by players throughout the tournament.

#	Player	Round	Average	Result
1	Jeffrey de Zwaan	R3	106.09	Won
2	Peter Wright	QF	105.86	Won
3	Gerwyn Price	R3	104.20	Won
4	Michael van Gerwen	R4	104.09	Won
5	Dimitri Van den Bergh	R2	103.81	Won
6	Michael van Gerwen	F	102.88	Lost
7	Peter Wright	F	102.79	Won
8	Dave Chisnall	R3	101.75	Lost
9	Ryan Searle	R2	101.54	Won
10	Chris Dobey	R3	101.09	Won

== Representation ==
This table shows the number of players by country in the 2020 PDC World Championship. A total of 28 nationalities were represented, sharing the record of the 2019 edition.

	(Scotland) SCO	(Netherlands) NED	(England) ENG	(Wales) WAL	(Belgium) BEL	(Lithuania) LIT	(Australia) AUS	(Germany) GER	(Northern Ireland) NIR	(Japan) JPN	(Poland) POL	(Austria) AUT	(Philippines) PHI	(Spain) SPA	(United States) USA	(Republic of Ireland) IRL	(Brazil) BRA	(Canada) CAN	(China) CHN	(Finland) FIN	(India) IND	(Latvia) LAT	(New Zealand) NZL	(Portugal) POR	(South Africa) RSA	(Russia) RUS	(Singapore) SIN	(Slovenia) SVN	Total
Final	1	1	0	0	0	0	0	0	0	0	0	0	0	0	0	0	0	0	0	0	0	0	0	0	0	0	0	0	2
Semi-final	1	1	1	1	0	0	0	0	0	0	0	0	0	0	0	0	0	0	0	0	0	0	0	0	0	0	0	0	4
Quarter-final	1	1	3	1	1	1	0	0	0	0	0	0	0	0	0	0	0	0	0	0	0	0	0	0	0	0	0	0	8
Round 4	2	2	7	1	2	1	1	0	0	0	0	0	0	0	0	0	0	0	0	0	0	0	0	0	0	0	0	0	16
Round 3	3	3	15	2	2	1	1	2	1	1	1	0	0	0	0	0	0	0	0	0	0	0	0	0	0	0	0	0	32
Round 2	3	9	28	2	2	1	3	2	2	2	1	2	1	2	2	2	0	0	0	0	0	0	0	0	0	0	0	0	64
Round 1	0	7	20	0	1	1	3	2	3	3	0	2	2	2	2	4	1	1	1	1	1	1	1	1	1	1	1	1	64
Total	3	11	37	2	2	1	4	3	4	3	1	3	2	2	2	4	1	1	1	1	1	1	1	1	1	1	1	1	96

== Media coverage ==
As with every previous PDC World Darts Championship, Sky Sports provided live coverage to the UK and Ireland. Sky Sports Darts, a temporary channel, broadcast all the games, with certain days simulcast on Sky Sports Main Event. BDO Ladies player Laura Turner and PDC player Devon Petersen joined the commentary team, alongside former players Wayne Mardle, John Part, Mark Webster and Rod Harrington, and commentators Rod Studd, Stuart Pyke, Nigel Pearson and David Croft. Dave Clark served as lead presenter, with Laura Woods and David Croft also hosting sessions.

Talksport held the national radio rights to the tournament, with the majority of their coverage to be held on talksport 2. The coverage was presented by Andy Goldstein & Ray Stubbs. Commentary was provided by Nigel Pearson, John Gwynne, Ian Danter, Chris Mason, Paul Nicholson and Chris Murphy.

International broadcasters included DAZN in the United States and RTL in the Netherlands.
