= José Justicia =

Spanish darts player (born 1989)

Personal information
- Full name: José Antonio Justicia Perales
- Nickname: "The Joker"
- Born: 6 January 1989 (age 37) Petrer, Spain

Sport
- Sport: Darts
- Playing since: 2009
- Darts: 19g Cosmo Signature
- Laterality: Right-handed
- Walk-on music: "Welcome to Jamrock" by Damian Marley

Organisation (see split in darts)
- PDC: 2018–present (Tour Card: 2018–2019; 2022–2023)
- WDF: 2021, 2025
- Current world ranking: (PDC) NR (18 October 2026)

PDC premier events – best performances
- World Championship: Last 64: 2020
- UK Open: Last 64: 2019

Other tournament wins
- Years
PDC Challenge Tour	2021
Bullshooter European Championship	2012
FCD Anniversary Open	2025
Medal record
Men's Darts
Representing Spain
EDF European Darts Championship
Gold medal – first place	2024 Podčetrtek	Men's singles
Gold medal – first place	2024 Podčetrtek	Men's cricket
Gold medal – first place	2024 Podčetrtek	Men's pairs
Gold medal – first place	2025 Podčetrtek	Mixed doubles
Silver medal – second place	2021 Podčetrtek	Men's pairs
Silver medal – second place	2023 Podčetrtek	Men's singles
Silver medal – second place	2025 Podčetrtek	Men's pairs

José Antonio Justicia Perales (born 6 January 1989) is a Spanish darts player who competes in Professional Darts Corporation (PDC) events.

== Career ==
Justicia started his career in 2009 and participated in PDPA Players Championship events in Gibraltar and Nuland. At the end of the year, he attempted to qualify through PDC World Spain Qualifying Event for 2010 PDC World Darts Championship, but lost in the quarterfinal phase to Francisco Ruiz. Next years he participated mainly in soft-tip darts and became a European champion in Soft Tip Bullshooter European Championship 2012. He appeared in several other PDPA Players Championship events in 2011 and 2012, in Germany, Netherlands and Spain.

Between 2012 and 2018 Justicia played soft-tip darts, reaching quarterfinal of Soft Tip Dartslive Las Vegas in 2016.

In January 2018 he won a PDC Tour Card. He reached the final on Day 3, where he lost to Tytus Kanik, but adter reaching the last 16 on the final day, Justicia won his Tour Card via the PDC Q-School Order of Merit. During one of the UK Open Qualifier tournaments, Justicia was pushed by Adrian Lewis and players had to be separated by stewards. On 2 February 2018 the Darts Regulation Authority ("DRA") released a statement that Lewis would be suspended with immediate effect pending an appeal following an incident with Justicia in the first UK Open qualifier. On 8 February 2018, Lewis was given a three-month ban suspended for six months after Lewis admitted he broke DRA rules.

In March, he played his first major tournament, the 2018 UK Open, where he lost to Joe Cullen 6–2 in the second round. Justicia qualified for his two PDC European Tour events, the 2018 German Darts Open and the 2018 International Darts Open. He was unable to qualify for the 2019 PDC World Darts Championship via the PDC Pro Tour Order of Merit, and he was eliminated in the quarter-final of PDC World South West European Qualifying Event.

Justicia played in the 2019 UK Open and won his first major tournament match, beating Kevin Thoburn 6–2. In the last 96 he lost in a deciding leg to Ricky Evans 6–5. In April, he reached his first PDC Pro Tour quarter-final at Players Championship 10, marking his career best at that time.

After winning the South West Europe Qualifier, Justicia secured his debut at 2020 PDC World Darts Championship. He played Arron Monk in the first round and won 3–0. In the second round, Justicia faced the 17th seed, Stephen Bunting, to whom he lost to 2–3 in sets. After the tournament, Justicia placed 82nd in PDC Order of Merit and lost his Tour card.

In January 2020, Justicia entered PDC Q-School, trying to regain his Tour card. Despite reaching a quarter-final on Day 4, he was unable to retain his card. He played on the PDC Challenge Tour and was also participating in online darts.

In 2021, he failed to get a Tour Card in PDC EU Q-school and continued on the PDC Challenge Tour. Justicia won the 7th tournament of the year, in Niedernhausen, his first title on the circuit. In September, he represented Spain in the 2021 PDC World Cup of Darts alongside Jesús Noguera, where they lost in a deciding leg against the South African team of Devon Petersen and Carl Gabriel.

In January 2022, Justicia entered EU Q-School and on Day 1 in the final he whitewashed Mario Vandenbogaerde 6–0 to secure his PDC Tour Card and return to the professional circuit. He reached the third round of the 2022 UK Open, where he lost in a deciding leg to Adam Gawlas, despite hitting a nine-dart finish during the match.

== World Championship results ==
=== PDC ===
- 2020: Second round (lost to Stephen Bunting 2–3)
- 2023: First round (lost to Josh Rock 1–3)

== Performance timeline ==
=== PDC ===
Tournament	2018	2019	2020	2021	2022	2023
PDC Ranked televised events
World Championship	DNQ		2R	DNQ		1R
UK Open	2R	3R	DNP		3R	2R
PDC Non-ranked televised events
World Cup	DNP			1R	1R	RR
Career statistics
Year-end ranking	124	82	-	148	98	93

==== European Tour ====
Tournament	2018	2019	2022	2023
German Open	2R	Did not qualify		
International Open	1R	DNQ	DNP	2R
Danish Open	DNQ	1R	Not held	
German Championship	DNQ		2R	DNQ
Czech Open	NH	DNQ	3R	DNQ

==== Players Championships ====
Season	1	2	3	4	5	6	7	8	9	10	11	12	13	14	15	16	17	18	19	20	21	22	23	24	25	26	27	28	29	30				
2018	BAR; 2R	BAR; 1R	BAR; 1R	BAR; 1R	MIL; 1R	MIL; 1R	BAR; 1R	BAR; 1R	WIG; 2R	WIG; 1R	MIL; 1R	MIL; 3R	WIG; DNP		BAR; 1R	BAR; 1R	Did not participate																	
2019	WIG; 1R	WIG; 2R	WIG; DNP		BAR; 1R	BAR; 1R	WIG; 2R	WIG; 1R	BAR; 3R	BAR; QF	BAR; 1R	BAR; 1R	BAR; DNP	BAR; 1R	BAR; 1R	BAR; 1R	WIG; 1R	WIG; 2R	BAR; 1R	BAR; 4R	HIL; 1R	HIL; 1R	BAR; 1R	BAR; 1R	BAR; 2R	BAR; 2R	DUB; 3R	DUB; 4R	BAR; 1R	BAR; 1R				
2021	Did not participate								NIE; 1R	NIE; 4R	NIE; 3R	NIE; 1R	MIL; 1R	MIL; 1R	MIL; 2R	MIL; 1R	COV; 1R	COV; 1R	COV; 1R	COV; 1R	BAR; DNP		BAR; 2R	BAR; 1R	BAR; 3R	BAR; 1R	BAR; 1R	BAR; DNP	BAR; 1R	BAR; 2R				
2022	BAR; 1R	BAR; 1R	WIG; 3R	WIG; 1R	BAR; 1R	BAR; 2R	NIE; 1R	NIE; 1R	BAR; 1R	BAR; 1R	BAR; 1R	BAR; QF	BAR; 2R	WIG; 2R	WIG; 2R	NIE; 1R	NIE; 1R	BAR; 1R	BAR; 1R	BAR; 2R	BAR; 1R	BAR; 1R	BAR; 2R	BAR; 1R	BAR; 1R	BAR; 1R	BAR; 1R	BAR; 2R	BAR; DNP					
2023	BAR; 3R	BAR; 1R	BAR; 2R	BAR; 1R	BAR; 2R	BAR; 3R	HIL; 3R	HIL; 1R	WIG; 1R	WIG; 1R	LEI; 1R	LEI; 1R	HIL; 1R	HIL; 2R	LEI; 2R	LEI; 2R	HIL; 1R	HIL; 1R	BAR; 1R	BAR; 1R	BAR; 1R	BAR; 1R	BAR; 2R	BAR; 1R	BAR; 1R	BAR; 1R	BAR; 1R	BAR; 2R	BAR; DNP					
2026	Did not participate				LEI; 1R	LEI; 1R	Did not participate																		HIL	HIL	LEI	LEI	ROS	ROS	ROS	ROS	LEI	LEI
