= Max Hopp =

German darts player (born 1996)

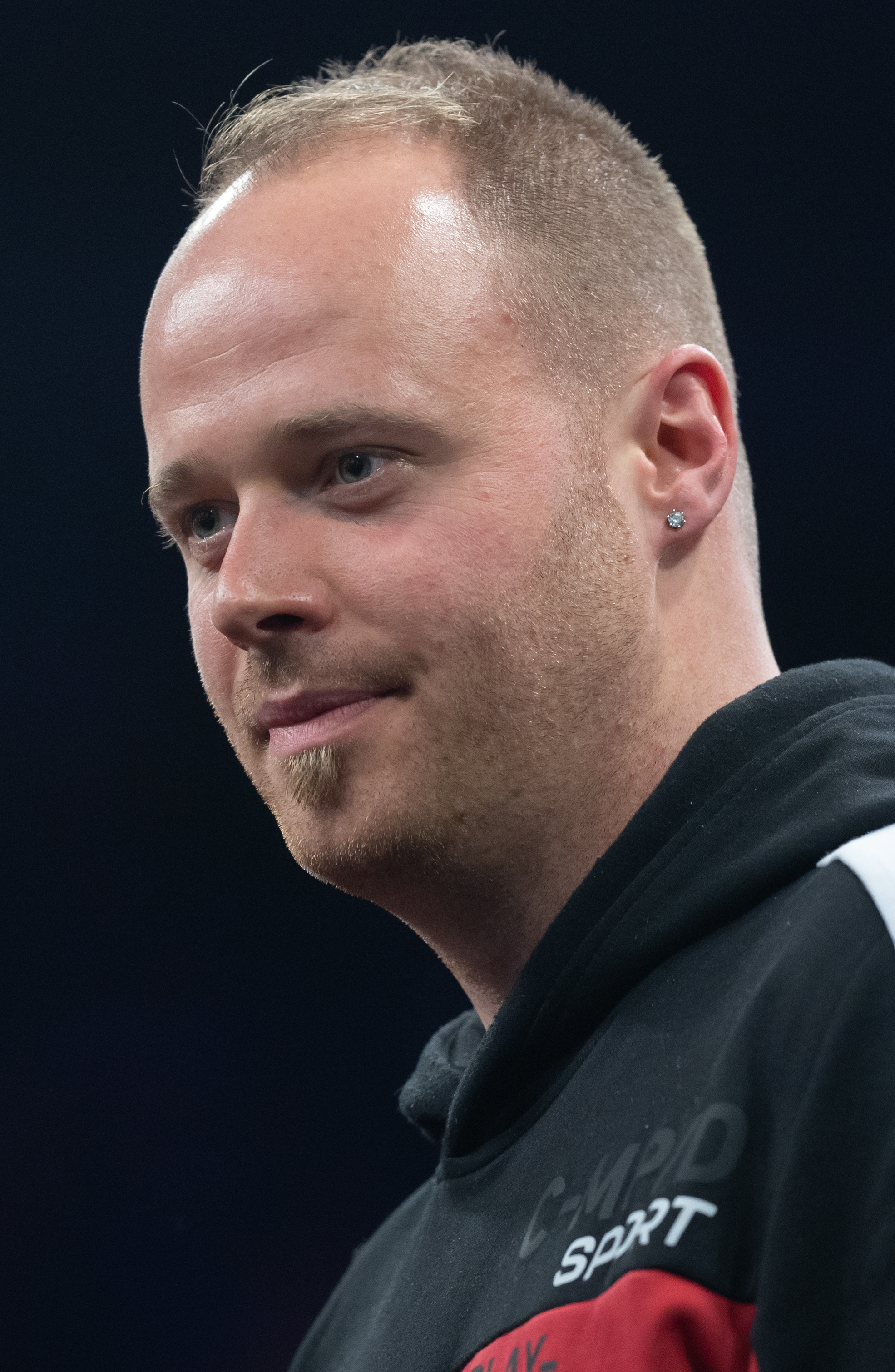
- Hopp in 2026

Personal information
- Nickname: "Maximiser"
- Born: 20 August 1996 (age 30) Idstein, Germany

Sport
- Sport: Darts
- Playing since: 2008
- Darts: 23g Bulls NL Signature
- Laterality: Right-handed
- Walk-on music: "Hey Baby" by DJ Ötzi

Organisation (see split in darts)
- BDO: 2011–2012
- PDC: 2012–present (Tour Card: 2015–2022; 2025–)
- Current world ranking: (PDC) 66 (5 November 2026)

PDC premier events – best performances
- World Championship: Last 32: 2015, 2017, 2019, 2020
- World Matchplay: Last 16: 2019
- World Grand Prix: Last 32: 2018, 2019
- UK Open: Last 32: 2019, 2021
- Grand Slam: Group Stage: 2016, 2018
- European Championship: Semi-final: 2018
- Premier League: Challenger: 2019
- PC Finals: Last 32: 2018, 2019
- World Series Finals: Last 16: 2015, 2017

Other tournament wins
- Years
Austrian Open	2012
Italian Grand Masters	2011
European Tour Events (x1)
German Darts Open	2018
Players Championships (x1)
2018
Youth events
PDC World Youth Championship	2015
Austrian Open	2012
PDC Development Tour	2016
Medal record
Men's Darts
Representing Germany
EDF European Ch'ship
Silver medal – second place	2014 Podčetrtek	Men's singles
EDU European Ch'ship
Gold medal – first place	2016 Poreč	Men's singles
WDF Europe Cup Youth
Gold medal – first place	2012 Antwerp	Men's singles
Bronze medal – third place	2012 Antwerp	Men's team

Max Hopp (born 20 August 1996) is a German professional darts player who competes in Professional Darts Corporation (PDC) events. He won 2 PDC ranking titles in 2018, becoming the first German to win a Pro Tour event and the first to win on the PDC European Tour.

In his youth career, Hopp won the 2015 PDC World Youth Championship and a title on the PDC Development Tour.

== Career ==
Hopp reached the final of the 2011 WDF World Cup boys' singles, and won the boys' singles event at the 2012 WDF Europe Youth Cup. He also reached the last 16 of the 2012 Dutch Darts Masters, defeating Terry Jenkins and Steve Beaton before losing to Paul Nicholson.

Hopp qualified for the 2013 PDC World Darts Championship by winning the Central European Qualifier in Bielefeld and in doing so became the second-youngest player ever to compete at the championships after Mitchell Clegg. Hopp played Charl Pietersen of South Africa in the preliminary round winning by 4 legs to 1 to set up a first round match against Denis Ovens. Hopp took the first and third sets to lead the match 2–1, but then lost six legs in a row to bow out of the tournament with a 2–3 defeat.

Hopp entered Q School in an attempt to win a PDC Tour Card to play the full circuit in 2013, but could not get past the last 64 in any of the four days. He qualified for the second European Tour event of the year, the European Darts Trophy and beat Dragutin Horvat 6–1 in the first round, before losing 3–6 to Dean Winstanley. Hopp also qualified for the European Darts Open and the Austrian Darts Open, but lost in the first round in both. These results helped him to qualify for the European Championship for the first time through the European Order of Merit. He faced Paul Nicholson in the first round and led 3–1, but would lose 4–6. Hopp beat Mark Walsh 6–4 in the opening round of the German Darts Championship and was then defeated 6–3 by Jamie Caven. Hopp lost in the semi-finals of the German World Championship Qualify to Andree Welge, but reached the tournament anyway due to finishing the year eighth on the European Order of Merit which saw him claim the first of four spots available to non-qualified players. Hopp played ninth seed Robert Thornton in the first round and won the first set, before going on to be defeated 3–1.

Hopp began 2014 ranked world number 76, outside of the top 64 who guarantee themselves entry into every event for the year ahead. He entered Q School in an attempt to win a two-year tour card but was not successful and only had PDPA Associate Member status for 2014 which gave him entry to UK Open and European Tour qualifiers as well as the Challenge Tour. He qualified for six of the eight European Tour events losing in the first round in five of them, with the exception coming at the European Darts Grand Prix by eliminating Mike de Decker, but then lost 6–1 to Dave Chisnall. He also lost two finals on the Youth Tour and the final of the 10th Challenge Tour event 5–4 to Jay Foreman.

=== 2015 ===
In the German Qualifier for the 2015 World Championship, Hopp beat Sascha Stein 10–8 in the final but subsequently qualified through the Pro Tour Order of Merit to begin the tournament in the first round, instead of the preliminary round. He produced a superb performance against Mervyn King to beat him 3–2, sealing his place in the second round with a 161 finish. Hopp hit 10 180s during the match, the most of all the first round players in the event. He was comfortably defeated 4–0 by Vincent van der Voort in the second round. However, his play during 2014 and at the World Championship saw him rise 14 places in the rankings during the year to start 2015 62nd, the first time Hopp has been inside the top 64 who gain their PDC tour cards. At the first UK Open Qualifier he eliminated Kevin Painter, Ian White and Michael Smith to play in his first quarter-final in the PDC, where Brendan Dolan beat Hopp 6–5. This result helped him enter the UK Open at the third round stage where Kim Huybrechts beat him 9–7 after Hopp had been 7–5 up. Hopp played in his first World Cup of Darts this year. He partnered Jyhan Artut and they saw off India and Austria to make the quarter-finals, where they lost both their singles matches against England to exit the tournament. He was invited to play in the inaugural World Series of Darts Finals and saw off Dimitri Van den Bergh 6–3, before losing by a reversal of this scoreline to Peter Wright in the second round. In the final of the 2015 World Youth Championship, Hopp was never ahead of his opponent Nathan Aspinall until the final leg when he sealed the title with a 6–5 win.

=== 2016 ===
Hopp lost 3–1 to Benito van de Pas in the first round of the 2016 World Championship. He couldn't qualify for the UK Open, but at the fourth Players Championship he reached his first quarter-final in a year by seeing off Mensur Suljović 6–2. Hopp then lost by a reversal of this scoreline to Gerwyn Price. He claimed the fifth Development Tour title with a 4–2 victory over Steve Lennon. At the European Darts Matchplay, Hopp beat Joe Murnan 6–5, Ian White 6–2 and Terry Jenkins 6–3 to progress through to his first European Tour quarter-final, where he was defeated 6–4 by Peter Wright. He got to the second round of the European Championship by eliminating Benito van de Pas 6–4, but was heavily defeated 10–3 by James Wade. His World Youth title qualified Hopp for his first Grand Slam of Darts where he was beaten 5–4 by Brendan Dolan and defeated Martin Adams 5–2, but a 5–1 loss to Michael van Gerwen would see him finish third in Group A and exit the tournament.

=== 2017 ===
After eliminating Vincent van der Voort 3–1 at the 2017 World Championship, Hopp lost 4–0 to Kim Huybrechts in the second round. He teamed up with Martin Schindler at the World Cup and they played the Netherlands in the quarter-finals after overcoming Northern Ireland and Brazil. The match went to a doubles game after Schindler lost to Michael van Gerwen and Hopp beat Raymond van Barneveld 4–3 and Germany lost 4–1. He was also given an invite to play in the 2017 US Darts Masters, but was knocked out in the first round by Canada's Dave Richardson 6–3. He also qualified for the 2017 German Darts Masters, but was again knocked out 6–3 in the first round, this time by Gary Anderson.

=== 2018 ===
After failing to qualify for the 2018 World Championship, Hopp had a steady start to 2018, he did not win enough ranking money in the UK Open Qualifiers and therefore failed to qualify for the 2018 UK Open, but he then reached the quarter-finals at the 2018 German Darts Grand Prix and Players Championship 7.

Hopp was one of four Host Nation Qualifiers for the 2018 German Darts Open. He dispatched Zoran Lerchbacher 6–1 in the first round, before defeating the defending champion and No. 2 seed Peter Wright, Benito van de Pas and Joe Cullen each 6–4. This made Hopp the first German to qualify for a PDC European Tour semi-final. He then defeated the reigning world champion Rob Cross 7–6 in a last leg decider in the semi-finals. After missing 4 match darts to win 7–5, Hopp took out 121 on the bullseye. He then faced Michael Smith in the final. After being behind for most of the match, Hopp won 8–7, again taking out 121 on the bullseye (with exactly the same route as in his semi-finals victory over Cross), to win the title.

Hopp won his second senior PDC title at Players Championship 19. He defeated Alan Norris 6–2 in the first round, then had wins over Davy van Baelen 6–4, Darren Webster 6–2, Jamie Hughes 6–1, Jermaine Wattimena 6–5 in a deciding leg to reach the semi-finals. He then achieved 6–3 victories against James Wilson and Madars Razma to pick up the title.

=== 2019 ===
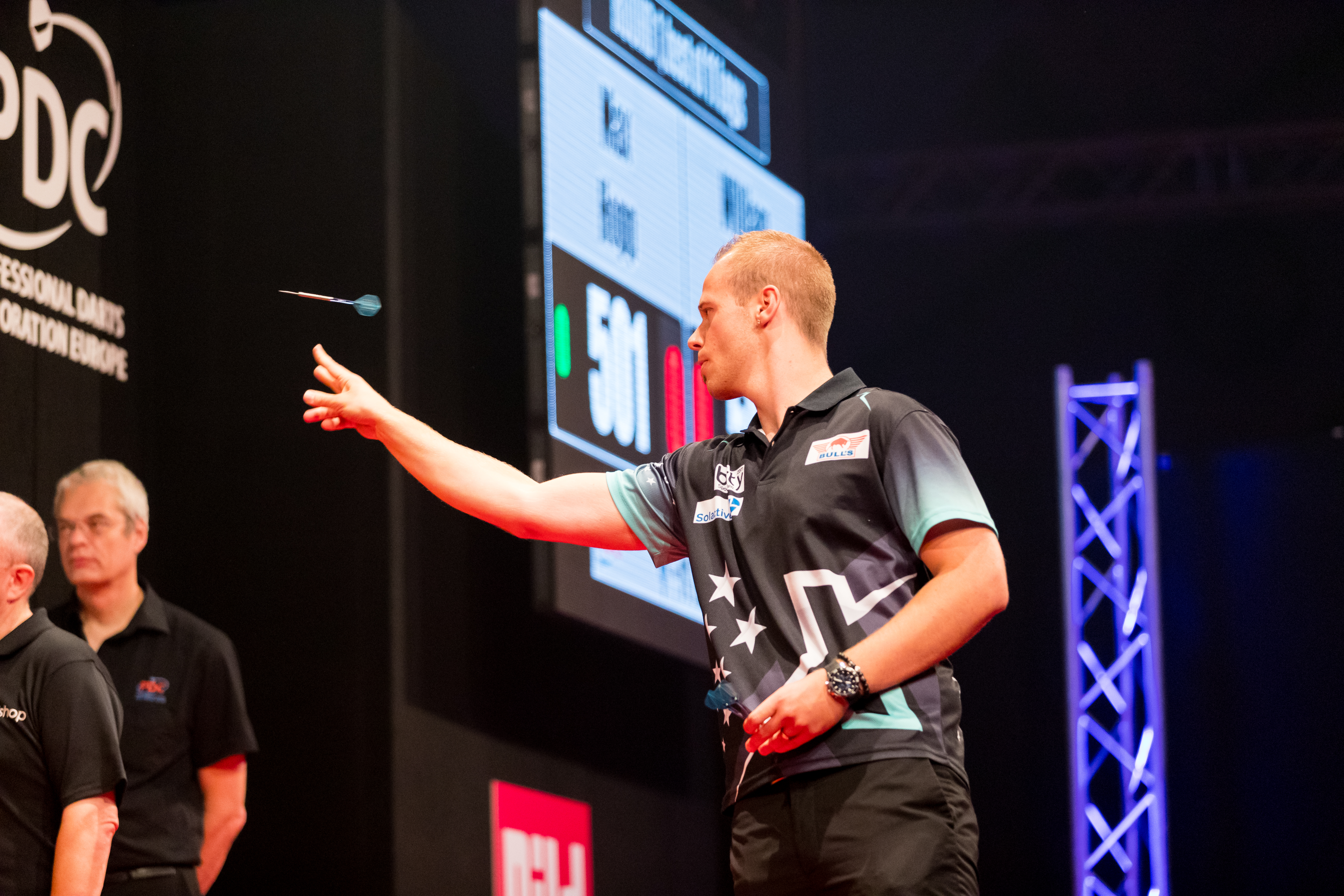
Hopp at the 2019 European Darts Matchplay

At the 2019 PDC World Darts Championship, Hopp defeated Danny Noppert 3–0 to reach the third round for the first time. He lost his third-round match against Michael van Gerwen, who went on to win the tournament.

Following Gary Anderson's withdrawal from the 2019 Premier League, Hopp was selected as one of nine 'contenders' to replace him. He played a one-off match against Raymond van Barneveld on night seven in Berlin, losing 7–3.

=== 2020–2024: Injury issues and loss of Tour Card ===
Following the COVID-19 pandemic, Hopp suffered from injury issues, most notably torn ankle ligaments in June 2021. This injury continued to plague him, losing his tour-card at the end of 2022 and failing to regain it at both the 2023 and 2024 Q-School.

In August 2024, he made his return to the PDC European Tour, appearing at the 2024 German Darts Championship as a host-nation qualifier. In his first-round match, a first big-stage appearance in two years, he defeated José de Sousa 6–2 before losing in the second round to Joe Cullen.

=== 2025 ===
Following his return to the PDC European Tour, Hopp regained his Tour Card at 2025 Q-School after finishing 10th in the European Q-School Order of Merit.

Hopp qualified for 2 events on the 2025 European Tour. He achieved one victory; beating Luke Woodhouse 6–3 in the first round of the 2025 Dutch Darts Championship. He lost to eventual champion Jonny Clayton 6–2 in the second round.

Hopp reached the last 16 twice in 2025 PDC Players Championship series events, doing so at Players Championship 11 in April and Players Championship 30 in October.

In the first round of the 2026 PDC World Darts Championship, his first appearance at the competition since the 2021 tournament, Hopp defeated Martin Lukeman 3–1.

== World Championship results ==
=== PDC World Championship ===
- 2013: First round (lost to Denis Ovens 2–3)
- 2014: First round (lost to Robert Thornton 1–3)
- 2015: Second round (lost to Vincent van der Voort 0–4)
- 2016: First round (lost to Benito van de Pas 1–3)
- 2017: Second round (lost to Kim Huybrechts 0–4)
- 2019: Third round (lost to Michael van Gerwen 1–4)
- 2020: Third round (lost to Darius Labanauskas 2–4)
- 2021: Second round (lost to Mervyn King 1–3)
- 2026: Second round (lost to Luke Woodhouse 0–3)

== Career finals ==
=== PDC European tour finals: (1 title) ===
Legend
Other (1–0)

Outcome	No.	Year	Championship	Opponent in the final	Score
Winner	1.	2018	German Darts Open	Michael Smith	8–7 (l)

== Performance timeline ==
=== PDC ===
Tournament	2012	2013	2014	2015	2016	2017	2018	2019	2020	2021	2022	2023	2024	2025	2026
PDC Ranked televised events
World Championship	DNQ	1R	1R	2R	1R	2R	DNQ	3R	3R	2R	Did not qualify				2R
World Masters	Did not qualify													Prel.	Prel.
UK Open	Did not qualify			3R	Did not qualify			5R	WD	5R	3R	DNQ		1R	2R
World Matchplay	Did not qualify						1R	2R	Did not qualify						
World Grand Prix	Did not qualify						1R	1R	Did not qualify						
European Championship	DNQ	1R	DNQ	1R	2R	DNQ	SF	DNQ	1R	Did not qualify					
Grand Slam	Did not qualify				RR	DNQ	RR	Did not qualify							
Players Championship Finals	Did not qualify						2R	2R	Did not qualify					1R	
PDC Non-ranked televised events
World Youth Championship	2R	3R	1R	W	2R	3R	DNP	2R	Did not participate						

==== European Tour ====
Season	1	2	3	4	5	6	7	8	9	10	11	12	13	14	15
2012	Did not qualify				DDM; 3R										
2013	UKM; DNQ	EDT; 2R	EDO; 1R	ADO; 1R	GDT; DNQ	GDC; 2R	GDM; 1R	DDM; 1R							
2014	GDC; 1R	DDM; 1R	GDM; 1R	ADO; 1R	DNQ		EDG; 2R	EDT; 1R							
2015	Did not qualify			DDM; 2R	IDO; 3R	EDO; DNQ	EDT; 2R	EDM; 1R	EDG; 1R						
2016	DNQ		GDT; 3R	EDM; QF	ADO; DNQ	EDO; 1R	IDO; 1R	EDT; 1R	EDG; 2R	GDC; DNQ					
2017	GDC; DNQ	GDM; 2R	GDO; DNQ	EDG; 2R	GDT; DNQ	EDM; 1R	DNQ		DDM; 1R	GDG; 1R	IDO; 2R	EDT; DNQ			
2018	EDO; 1R	GDG; QF	GDO; W	ADO; 2R	EDG; 1R	DDM; 1R	GDT; 3R	DDO; 2R	EDM; 2R	GDC; 1R	DDC; 2R	IDO; 2R	EDT; 3R		
2019	DNQ		GDG; SF	GDO; 2R	ADO; 2R	EDG; 2R	DDM; 3R	Did not qualify			EDM; 1R	DNQ			
2020	BDC; DNQ	GDC; 3R	EDG; 2R	IDO; 3R											
2022	DNQ		GDG; 3R	Did not qualify											
2024	Did not qualify								GDC; 2R	Did not qualify					
2025	Did not qualify					EDG; 1R	DDC; 2R	Did not qualify							
2026	Did not qualify							BSD; 1R	SDO; DNQ	EDO; 2R	Did not qualify				DDC; 1R

==== Players Championships ====
Season	1	2	3	4	5	6	7	8	9	10	11	12	13	14	15	16	17	18	19	20	21	22	23	24	25	26	27	28	29	30	31	32	33	34
2015	BAR; 2R	BAR; 2R	BAR; 3R	BAR; QF	BAR; 2R	COV; DNP	COV; 1R	COV; 2R	CRA; 2R	CRA; 2R	BAR; 3R	BAR; 3R	WIG; 1R	WIG; 2R	BAR; 2R	BAR; 2R	DUB; 1R	DUB; 3R	COV; 4R	COV; 4R														
2016	BAR; 1R	BAR; 1R	BAR; 3R	BAR; QF	BAR; 1R	BAR; 2R	BAR; 1R	COV; 1R	COV; 3R	BAR; 2R	BAR; 1R	BAR; 1R	BAR; 2R	BAR; 1R	BAR; 2R	BAR; 1R	DNP			BAR; 3R														
2017	BAR; 1R	BAR; 1R	BAR; 2R	BAR; 1R	MIL; 1R	MIL; 3R	BAR; DNP		WIG; 1R	WIG; 1R	MIL; DNP	MIL; 1R	WIG; DNP		BAR; 2R	BAR; 2R	BAR; 1R	BAR; 2R	DUB; 1R	DUB; 1R	BAR; 2R	BAR; 3R												
2018	BAR; 1R	BAR; 1R	BAR; 2R	BAR; 1R	MIL; 2R	MIL; 2R	BAR; QF	BAR; 4R	DNP				WIG; 2R	WIG; 4R	BAR; 1R	BAR; 1R	BAR; 3R	BAR; 2R	DUB; W	DUB; 2R	BAR; DNP													
2019	WIG; DNP			WIG; 2R	BAR; 4R	BAR; 3R	WIG; 2R	WIG; 2R	BAR; 4R	BAR; 1R	BAR; 4R	BAR; 1R	BAR; 3R	BAR; 3R	BAR; 3R	BAR; F	WIG; 2R	WIG; 1R	BAR; 2R	BAR; 1R	HIL; 1R	HIL; 2R	BAR; 4R	BAR; 1R	BAR; QF	BAR; 1R	DUB; 2R	DUB; 1R	BAR; 2R	BAR; 4R				
2020	BAR; 1R	BAR; 1R	WIG; 3R	WIG; DNP	WIG; 1R	WIG; 1R	BAR; DNP		MIL; 2R	MIL; 1R	MIL; 1R	MIL; 3R	MIL; 1R	NIE; 1R	NIE; 1R	NIE; 2R	NIE; 2R	NIE; 2R	COV; 1R	COV; 2R	COV; 2R	COV; 2R	COV; 1R											
2021	BOL; 2R	BOL; 1R	BOL; 3R	BOL; 2R	MIL; 3R	MIL; 1R	MIL; 1R	MIL; 1R	NIE; 3R	NIE; 3R	NIE; 1R	NIE; 1R	MIL; DNP				COV; 2R	COV; 1R	COV; 1R	COV; 3R	BAR; 4R	BAR; 1R	BAR; 1R	BAR; 1R	BAR; 1R	BAR; 1R	BAR; 3R	BAR; 1R	BAR; 1R	BAR; 2R				
2022	BAR; 1R	BAR; 3R	WIG; 3R	WIG; 1R	BAR; 1R	BAR; 1R	NIE; 1R	NIE; 2R	BAR; 3R	BAR; 1R	BAR; 1R	BAR; 1R	BAR; 1R	WIG; 4R	WIG; 3R	NIE; 1R	NIE; 1R	BAR; 1R	BAR; 2R	BAR; 1R	BAR; 1R	BAR; 2R	BAR; 2R	BAR; 1R	BAR; 1R	BAR; 1R	BAR; 1R	BAR; QF	BAR; 1R	BAR; 2R				
2023 (Note: Not a Tour card holder)	Did not participate																																	
2024	Did not participate																																	
2025	WIG; 1R	WIG; 1R	ROS; 2R	ROS; 1R	LEI; 2R	LEI; 1R	HIL; 3R	HIL; 2R	LEI; 3R	LEI; 2R	LEI; 4R	LEI; 1R	ROS; 3R	ROS; 2R	HIL; 2R	HIL; 1R	LEI; 3R	LEI; 2R	LEI; 1R	LEI; 1R	LEI; 3R	HIL; 2R	HIL; 1R	MIL; 1R	MIL; 1R	HIL; 2R	HIL; 2R	LEI; 1R	LEI; 2R	LEI; 4R	WIG; 2R	WIG; 2R	WIG; 2R	WIG; 1R
2026	HIL; 4R	HIL; 2R	WIG; 2R	WIG; 2R	LEI; 3R	LEI; 3R	LEI; 3R	LEI; 1R	WIG; 2R	WIG; 2R	MIL; 4R	MIL; QF	HIL; 1R	HIL; F	LEI; 1R	LEI; 1R	LEI; 2R	LEI; 1R	MIL; 3R	MIL; 1R	WIG; 2R	WIG; 1R	LEI; 2R	LEI; 2R	HIL; QF	HIL; 3R	LEI; DNP		ROS; 3R	ROS; 1R	ROS; 1R	ROS; 1R	LEI; 2R	LEI; 1R

Key

Performance Table Legend
W	Won the tournament	F	Finalist	SF	Semifinalist	QF	Quarterfinalist	#R; RR; Prel.	Lost in # round Round-robin; Preliminary round	DQ	Disqualified
DNQ	Did not qualify	DNP	Did not participate	WD	Withdrew	NH	Tournament not held	#R; RR; Prel.	Lost in # round Round-robin; Preliminary round	NYF	Not yet founded
