= Noel Malicdem =

Filipino darts player

Personal information
- Born: 10 January 1977 (age 49) Quezon City, Philippines
- Home town: Pasig, Philippines

Sport
- Sport: Darts
- Playing since: 1999
- Darts: 18g
- Laterality: Right-handed
- Walk-on music: "He's a Pirate" by Klaus Badelt and Hans Zimmer

Organisation (see split in darts)
- PDC: 2018–

PDC premier events – best performances
- World Championship: Last 64: 2019, 2020

Other tournament wins
- Years
PDC Asian Tour	2018 (x2), 2019
Medal record
Men's Darts
Representing Philippines
WDF World Cup
Bronze medal – third place	2025 Seoul	Men's pairs

Noel Malicdem (born 10 January 1977) is a Filipino darts player who plays in Professional Darts Corporation (PDC) events.

== Career ==
Malicdem qualified for the 2019 World Championship. In his first round he defeated Jeffrey de Graaf 2:3, but lost in the second round to Kyle Anderson. A year later he again managed to qualify for the 2020 World Championship as a qualifier from Asian Tour, where he finished on 4th place overall. In the first round of the championship, he quite easily won 3:0 over Rowby-John Rodriguez. In the second round he was leading and had match darts against Peter Wright, but in the end he wasn't able to check-out and eventually lost in sudden death leg.

In 2019 he represented the Philippines alongside Lourence Ilagan in the PDC World Cup of Darts, but they lost in the first round against England.

== World Championship results ==
=== PDC ===
- 2019: Second round (lost to Kyle Anderson 1–3)
- 2020: Second round (lost to Peter Wright 2–3)

== Performance timeline ==
PDC

Tournament	2019	2020
PDC World Championship	2R	2R
Non-ranked televised events
PDC World Cup of Darts	1R	1R
Career statistics
Year-end ranking	110	-

Key

Performance Table Legend
W	Won the tournament	F	Finalist	SF	Semifinalist	QF	Quarterfinalist	#R; RR; Prel.	Lost in # round Round-robin; Preliminary round	DQ	Disqualified
DNQ	Did not qualify	DNP	Did not participate	WD	Withdrew	NH	Tournament not held	#R; RR; Prel.	Lost in # round Round-robin; Preliminary round	NYF	Not yet founded
