= Ciarán Teehan =

Irish darts player

Personal information
- Nickname: "The High Tower"
- Born: 15 March 1999 (age 27) Cork, Ireland
- Home town: Cork, Ireland

Sport
- Sport: Darts
- Playing since: 2014
- Darts: 23 Gram Bull's Signature
- Laterality: Right-handed
- Walk-on music: "The Irish Rover" by The Pogues & The Dubliners

Organisation (see split in darts)
- BDO: 2016–2020
- PDC: 2020–

WDF major events – best performances
- World Masters: Quarter-Finals: 2019

PDC premier events – best performances
- World Championship: Last 64: 2020
- UK Open: Last 96: 2021

Other tournament wins
- Years
| PDC Challenge Tour | 2019 |
| PDC Development Tour | 2023 |
| INDO Irish Masters | 2019 |
| INDO National Singles | 2018, 2019 |
| INDO Irish Matchplay | 2018 |
| INDO Irish Grand Prix | 2018 |
Medal record
Men's Darts
Representing Ireland
WDF Europe Cup
| Bronze medal – third place | 2022 Gandía | Men's team |

Ciarán Teehan (born 15 March 1999) is an Irish professional darts player who plays in Professional Darts Corporation (PDC) events.

== Career ==
Teehan qualified for the 2020 PDC World Darts Championship via the PDC Development Tour rankings. He defeated Ross Smith 3–0 in the round of 96 before narrowly losing his second game to Mervyn King.

He won PDC Challenge Tour event 17 of 2019. He was awarded a Tour Card for 2020 and 2021 by virtue of finishing on second place on the 2019 PDC Development Tour, reaching 3 semi finals and 2 finals on the tour.

He reached the quarter finals of the 2019 L180 World Masters losing to Mike Warburton.

Teehan qualified in the 2021 PDC World Darts Championship, he lost his first game to Wayne Jones by 2–3.

== World Championship results ==
=== PDC ===
- 2020: Second round (lost to Mervyn King 2–3)
- 2021: First round (lost to Wayne Jones 2–3)

== Performance timeline ==
| Tournament | 2020 | 2021 |
|---|---|---|
| PDC World Championship | 2R | 1R |
| UK Open | 1R | 3R |
