= Seigo Asada =

Japanese darts player (born 1980)

Seigo Asada 浅田 斉吾
Personal information
- Nickname: "The Ninja"
- Born: 6 March 1980 (age 46) Osaka, Japan

Sport
- Sport: Darts
- Playing since: 2000
- Darts: 22g Trinidad Signature
- Laterality: Right-handed
- Walk-on music: "The Beginning" by ONE OK ROCK

Organisation (see split in darts)
- BDO: 2012–2017
- PDC: 2018–

WDF major events – best performances
- World Championship: Last 32: 2016
- World Masters: Last 16: 2014
- World Trophy: Last 32: 2016

PDC premier events – best performances
- World Championship: Last 32: 2020

Other tournament wins
- Years
Japan Open	2012, 2014, 2015, 2016, 2017
PDC Asian Tour Japan	2019
PDC Asian Tour Malaysia	2018
PDC Asian Tour Singapore	2019 (x2)
PDC Asian Tour South Korea	2018
PDC Asian Tour Taipei	2018
PDC World Japan Qualifying	2017, 2018, 2019

Seigo Asada (浅田 斉吾, Asada Seigo; born 6 March 1980) is a Japanese professional darts player who competes in Professional Darts Corporation (PDC) events.

== Career ==
=== BDO ===
Asada won the Japan Open in 2012 by beating Osamu Niki in the final. He won the tournament for the second time in 2014, beating Katsuya Aiba in the final. Asada reached the last 16 of the 2014 World Masters in Hull and beat Darryl Fitton in the first round before losing to Mark McGeeney. He qualified for the 2015 BDO World Darts Championship, losing to Brian Dawson in the preliminary round. Asada qualified for the 2016 BDO World Darts Championship, beating Darius Labanauskas 3–1 in the preliminary round.

=== PDC ===
In 2017, Asada won the Japanese Championship, organised by the PDJ (Professional Darts Japan). Thereby, he qualified for the 2018 PDC World Championship. On 26 November, he was drawn for a preliminary round game at the World Championship against Australian Gordon Mathers, whom he defeated 2–1, but was then eliminated 0–3 by eventual tournament winner Rob Cross.

In 2018, Asada won three events on the inaugural PDC Asian Tour, and also won the Japanese Championship to qualify for the 2019 PDC World Darts Championship. At the World Championship, Asada won his first round match 3–2, despite losing the first two sets to Krzysztof Ratajski, upsetting the Pole who had won three PDC Pro Tour titles that year. In the second round, Asada's match again went to a deciding set, which he lost to James Wade. The match was controversial, with Wade appearing to shout at Asada on stage, and saying in the post-match interview that he "wanted to hurt [Asada] in his face". This was criticised by Sky Sports pundit Wayne Mardle, who described his behaviour as "thuggish" and "overly aggressive". Wade apologised the next day, attributing his behaviour to an episode of hypomania.

== World Championship results ==
=== BDO ===
- 2015: Preliminary round (lost to Brian Dawson 1–3)
- 2016: First round (lost to Wesley Harms 2–3)
- 2017: Preliminary round (lost to Jeff Smith 1–3)

=== PDC ===
- 2018: First round (lost to Rob Cross 0–3)
- 2019: Second round (lost to James Wade 2–3)
- 2020: Third round (lost to Peter Wright 2–4)

== Performance timeline ==
BDO

Tournament	2012	2013	2014	2015	2016	2017
BDO World Championship	DNP	DNQ		PR	1R	PR
World Masters	3R	4R	6R	1R	DNP	1R
BDO World Trophy	DNP		DNQ	DNP	1R	DNP

PDC

Tournament	2018	2019	2020
PDC World Championship	1R	2R	3R
Non-ranked televised events
PDC World Cup of Darts	QF	SF	1R
Career statistics
Year-end ranking	105		

Performance Table Legend
W	Won the tournament	F	Finalist	SF	Semifinalist	QF	Quarterfinalist	#R; RR; L#	Lost in # round Round-robin; Last # stage	DQ	Disqualified
DNQ	Did not qualify	DNP	Did not participate	WD	Withdrew	NH	Tournament not held	#R; RR; L#	Lost in # round Round-robin; Last # stage	NYF	Not yet founded
