= 2018 European Darts Open =

Tournament information
- Dates: 23–25 March 2018
- Venue: Ostermann-Arena
- Location: Leverkusen, Germany
- Organisation(s): Professional Darts Corporation (PDC)
- Format: Legs
- Prize fund: £135,000
- Winner's share: £25,000
- High checkout: 170 Simon Whitlock (third round); Michael van Gerwen (quarter-finals); Peter Wright (semi-finals)

Champion(s)
- (Netherlands) Michael van Gerwen

The 2018 European Darts Open was the first of thirteen PDC European Tour events on the 2018 PDC Pro Tour. The tournament took place at Ostermann-Arena, Leverkusen, Germany, from 23 to 25 March 2018. It featured a field of 48 players and £135,000 in prize money, with £25,000 going to the winner.

This was the first event in the PDC European Tour where the format of the semi-finals and final were slightly altered. As in previous years, the first 3 rounds of action, plus the quarter-finals were all best of 11 legs matches, but the semi-finals became best of 13 legs matches, and the final became a best of 15 legs match.

Peter Wright was the defending champion after defeating Mervyn King 6–2 in the final of the 2017 tournament. He reached the final of this tournament, but he was defeated by Michael van Gerwen 8–7 in the first best of 15 legs final.

== Prize money ==
This is how the prize money is divided:

Stage (num. of players)		Prize money
Winner	(1)	£25,000
Runner-up	(1)	£10,000
Semi-finalists	(2)	£6,000
Quarter-finalists	(4)	£4,000
Third round losers	(8)	£3,000
Second round losers	(16)	£2,000
First round losers	(16)	£1,000
Total	£135,000	

Prize money will count towards the PDC Order of Merit, the PDC Pro Tour Order of Merit and the European Tour Order of Merit, with one exception: should a seeded player lose in the second round (last 32), their prize money will not count towards any Orders of Merit, although they still receive the full prize money payment.

== Qualification and format ==
The top 16 entrants from the PDC Pro Tour Order of Merit on 6 February automatically qualified for the event and were seeded in the second round.

The remaining 32 places went to players from five qualifying events – 18 from the UK Qualifier (held in Barnsley on 16 February), eight from the West/South European Qualifier (held on 22 March), four from the Host Nation Qualifier (held on 22 March), one from the Nordic & Baltic Qualifier (held on 26 January) and one from the East European Qualifier (held on 26 January).

The following players participated in the tournament:

Top 16
1. (Netherlands) Michael van Gerwen (champion)
2. (Scotland) Peter Wright (runner-up)
3. (England) Michael Smith (third round)
4. (England) Rob Cross (third round)
5. (Northern Ireland) Daryl Gurney (second round)
6. (Austria) Mensur Suljović (third round)
7. (England) Joe Cullen (quarter-finals)
8. (Australia) Simon Whitlock (quarter-finals)
9. (England) Dave Chisnall (third round)
10. (Belgium) Kim Huybrechts (second round)
11. (England) Mervyn King (quarter-finals)
12. (England) Ian White (second round)
13. (Wales) Gerwyn Price (second round)
14. (Netherlands) Jelle Klaasen (second round)
15. (Australia) Kyle Anderson (second round)
16. (England) Alan Norris (third round)

UK Qualifier
- (England) Ritchie Edhouse (first round)
- (England) Steve Beaton (first round)
- (England) Luke Humphries (first round)
- (Scotland) John Henderson (third round)
- (Wales) Jonny Clayton (first round)
- (England) James Wade (semi-finals)
- (England) Richard North (semi-finals)
- (England) Adrian Lewis (second round)
- (Scotland) Cameron Menzies (second round)
- (England) Ryan Meikle (first round)
- (England) Justin Pipe (third round)
- (England) Luke Woodhouse (second round)
- (England) Wayne Jones (first round)
- (England) Mark Wilson (first round)
- (England) Jamie Hughes (second round)
- (England) Martin Atkins (first round)
- (England) Chris Dobey (third round)
- (England) Darren Johnson (second round)

West/South European Qualifier
- (Netherlands) Vincent van der Voort (first round)
- (Austria) Michael Rasztovits (first round)
- (Netherlands) Ron Meulenkamp (quarter-finals)
- (Netherlands) Jermaine Wattimena (second round)
- (Netherlands) Jeffrey de Zwaan (first round)
- (Netherlands) Jan Dekker (first round)
- (Belgium) Dimitri Van den Bergh (first round)
- (Netherlands) Danny Noppert (second round)

Host Nation Qualifier
- (Germany) Gabriel Clemens (second round)
- (Germany) Max Hopp (first round)
- (Germany) Maik Langendorf (first round)
- (Germany) Thomas Junghans (first round)

Nordic & Baltic Qualifier
- (Finland) Marko Kantele (second round)

East European Qualifier
- (Poland) Tytus Kanik (second round)

== Draw ==
First round (best of 11 legs); 23 March
(Scotland) Cameron Menzies 94.83	6
(England) Mark Wilson 87.63	2
(Wales) Jonny Clayton 86.91	2
(Netherlands) Jermaine Wattimena 90.55	6
(Netherlands) Jan Dekker 92.27	3
(Poland) Tytus Kanik 87.45	6
(Netherlands) Vincent van der Voort 96.27	4
(Finland) Marko Kantele 90.08	6
(Belgium) Dimitri Van den Bergh 87.25	3
(Netherlands) Ron Meulenkamp 90.37	6
(England) Justin Pipe 82.84	6
(Austria) Michael Rasztovits 80.37	2
(England) Adrian Lewis 97.06	6
(England) Ritchie Edhouse 96.25	5
(England) Richard North 85.89	6
(England) Martin Atkins 76.00	0
(England) Ryan Meikle 90.38	2
(England) Luke Woodhouse 94.74	6
(Scotland) John Henderson 95.82	6
(Germany) Maik Langendorf 84.84	2
(Netherlands) Jeffrey de Zwaan 82.82	4
(Netherlands) Danny Noppert 92.17	6
(England) Chris Dobey 93.08	6
(England) Wayne Jones 78.83	1
(Germany) Max Hopp 93.18	4
(England) Jamie Hughes 92.09	6
(Germany) Gabriel Clemens 99.06	6
(Germany) Thomas Junghans 84.74	1
(England) Darren Johnson 103.22	6
(England) Luke Humphries 99.55	2
(England) James Wade 96.93	6
(England) Steve Beaton 97.08	3

Second round (best of 11 legs); 24 March
1	(Netherlands) Michael van Gerwen 94.82	6
(Scotland) Cameron Menzies 84.30	3
16	(England) Alan Norris 89.70	6
(Netherlands) Jermaine Wattimena 89.96	4
8	(Australia) Simon Whitlock 91.96	6
(Poland) Tytus Kanik 94.75	2
9	(England) Dave Chisnall 88.36	6
(Finland) Marko Kantele 77.90	1
5	(Northern Ireland) Daryl Gurney 85.07	4
(Netherlands) Ron Meulenkamp 89.67	6
12	(England) Ian White 88.43	1
(England) Justin Pipe 89.66	6
4	(England) Rob Cross 107.44	6
(England) Adrian Lewis 91.03	1
13	(Wales) Gerwyn Price 84.69	5
(England) Richard North 94.66	6
2	(Scotland) Peter Wright 105.98	6
(England) Luke Woodhouse 90.54	3
15	(Australia) Kyle Anderson 91.68	4
(Scotland) John Henderson 98.19	6
7	(England) Joe Cullen 87.74	6
(Netherlands) Danny Noppert 86.67	5
10	(Belgium) Kim Huybrechts 94.09	2
(England) Chris Dobey 89.88	6
6	(Austria) Mensur Suljović 90.87	6
(England) Jamie Hughes 89.08	4
11	(England) Mervyn King 97.92	6
(Germany) Gabriel Clemens 91.27	2
3	(England) Michael Smith 99.48	6
(England) Darren Johnson 87.77	3
14	(Netherlands) Jelle Klaasen 88.98	3
(England) James Wade 94.38	6

Third round (best of 11 legs); 25 March
1	(Netherlands) van Gerwen 105.99	6
16	(England) Norris 96.64	3
8	(Australia) Whitlock 96.44	6
9	(England) Chisnall 84.23	1
(Netherlands) Meulenkamp 101.44	6
(England) Pipe 88.43	1
4	(England) Cross 97.69	5
(England) North 91.50	6
2	(Scotland) Wright 100.46	6
(Scotland) Henderson 90.21	2
7	(England) Cullen 98.88	6
(England) Dobey 95.73	5
6	(Austria) Suljović 94.90	3
11	(England) King 91.85	6
3	(England) Smith 106.21	4
(England) Wade 105.59	6

Quarter-finals (best of 11 legs); 25 March
1	(Netherlands) van Gerwen 101.61	6
8	(Australia) Whitlock 89.44	1
(Netherlands) Meulenkamp 85.74	2
(England) North 82.25	6
2	(Scotland) Wright 98.56	6
7	(England) Cullen 101.54	3
11	(England) King 93.14	4
(England) Wade 99.14	6

Semi-finals (best of 13 legs); 25 March
1	(Netherlands) van Gerwen 103.30	7
(England) North 92.48	1
2	(Scotland) Wright 102.48	7
(England) Wade 98.92	4

Final (best of 15 legs); 25 March
1	(Netherlands) van Gerwen 102.04	8
2	(Scotland) Wright 98.55	7
