= 1992–93 FIBA European Championship Regular Season Group B =

Standings and Results for Group B of the Regular Season phase of the FIBA European Championship 1992–93 basketball tournament.

Main page: FIBA European Championship 1992–93

Key to colors
Top four places in each group advance to Playoff
Eliminated

Tiebreakers:

- Head-to-head record in matches between the tied clubs
- Overall point difference in games between the tied clubs
- Overall point difference in all group matches (first tiebreaker if tied clubs are not in the same group)
- Points scored in all group matches
- Sum of quotients of points scored and points allowed in each group match

== Standings ==
	Team	Pld	W	L	PF	PA	Diff
1.	(Spain) Real Madrid	14	12	2	1181	1031	+150
2.	(Italy) Benetton Treviso	14	10	4	1127	1073	+54
3.	(Greece) Olympiacos	14	8	6	1057	1023	+34
4.	(France) Pau-Orthez	14	8	6	1113	1100	+13
5.	(Germany) Bayer 04 Leverkusen	14	8	6	1099	1105	−6
6.	(Croatia) Zadar	14	5	9	1096	1198	−102
7.	(Spain) Estudiantes Caja Postal	14	4	10	1132	1131	+1
8.	(Belgium) Racing Maes Pils Mechelen	14	1	13	1092	1236	−144

Notes:

- Limoges CSP win the tiebreaker over Scavolini for second place and the home advantage in the quarterfinals.
- Knorr Bologna win the tiebreaker over Joventut Badalona for fourth place and a playoff berth. The two teams split their group matches, but Knorr scored 2 more points head-to-head.

== Fixtures and results ==
=== Game 1 ===
October 28–29, 1992

October 28
20:00

(Report)

Zadar (Croatia)	73–77	(Italy) Benetton Treviso
Scoring by quarter: 36-40, 37-37

Jazine Basketball Hall, Zadar
Attendance: 3,000

October 28
20:30

(Report)

Pau Orthez (France)	107–103 (OT)	(Belgium) Maes Pils Mechelen
Scoring by quarter: 40-51, 53-42, Overtime: 14-10

Palais des Sports, Pau
Attendance: 7,000

October 29
20:00

(Report)

Real Madrid (Spain)	79–75	(Germany) Bayer Leverkusen
Scoring by quarter: 44-34, 35-41

Palacio de Deportes, Madrid
Attendance: 3,000

October 29
21:35

(Report)

Olympiacos (Greece)	73–66	(Spain) Estudiantes
Scoring by quarter: 34-34, 39-32

Peace and Friendship Stadium, Athens
Attendance: 8,000

=== Game 2 ===
November 5, 1992

November 5
18:00

(Report)

Estudiantes (Spain)	82–84	(France) Pau Orthez
Scoring by quarter: 43-40, 39-44

Palacio de Deportes, Madrid
Attendance: 7,000

November 5
20:00

(Report)

Bayer Leverkusen (Germany)	66–63 (OT)	(Greece) Olympiacos
Scoring by quarter: 28-32, 26-22, Overtime: 12-9

Wilhelm Dopatka Halle, Leverkusen
Attendance: 4,500

November 5
20:00

(Report)

Maes Pils Mechelen (Belgium)	93–75	(Croatia) Zadar
Scoring by quarter: 52-41, 41-34

Sporthal Arena, Deurne
Attendance: 2,400

November 5
20:30

(Report)

Benetton Treviso (Italy)	65–66	(Spain) Real Madrid
Scoring by quarter: 28-32, 37-34

Palaverde, Treviso
Attendance: 6,500

=== Game 3 ===
November 25–26, 1992

November 25
19:00

(Report)

Real Madrid (Spain)	92–74	(Greece) Olympiacos
Scoring by quarter: 52-40, 40-34

Palacio de Deportes, Madrid
Attendance: 4,000

November 25
20:30

(Report)

Pau Orthez (France)	82–85	(Germany) Bayer Leverkusen
Scoring by quarter: 46-46, 36-39

Palais des Sports, Pau
Attendance: 6,000

November 26
18:00

(Report)

Zadar (Croatia)	106–89	(Spain) Estudiantes
Scoring by quarter: 53-29, 53-60

Jazine Basketball Hall, Zadar
Attendance: 2,500

November 26
20:00

(Report)

Maes Pils Mechelen (Belgium)	84–86	(Italy) Benetton Treviso
Scoring by quarter: 43-40, 41-46

Sporthal Arena, Deurne
Attendance: 3,000

=== Game 4 ===
December 2–3, 1992

December 2
19:00

(Report)

Real Madrid (Spain)	93–76	(Belgium) Maes Pils Mechelen
Scoring by quarter: 40-38, 53-38

Palacio de Deportes, Madrid
Attendance: 3,000

December 3
20:00

(Report)

Bayer Leverkusen (Germany)	79–72	(Croatia) Zadar
Scoring by quarter: 40-39, 39-33

Wilhelm Dopatka Halle, Leverkusen
Attendance: 4,000

December 3
20:30

(Report)

Benetton Treviso (Italy)	77–60	(Spain) Estudiantes
Scoring by quarter: 34-26, 43-34

Palaverde, Treviso
Attendance: 5,000

December 3
21:35

(Report)

Olympiacos (Greece)	93–96 (OT)	(France) Pau Orthez
Scoring by quarter: 42-40, 41-43, Overtime: 10-13

Peace and Friendship Stadium, Athens
Attendance: 8,000

=== Game 5 ===
December 9–10, 1992

December 9
20:00

(Report)

Estudiantes (Spain)	100–68	(Belgium) Maes Pils Mechelen
Scoring by quarter: 50-37, 50-31

Palacio de Deportes, Madrid
Attendance: 4,200

December 9
20:00

(Report)

Zadar (Croatia)	86–77	(Greece) Olympiacos
Scoring by quarter: 45-35, 41-42

Jazine Basketball Hall, Zadar
Attendance: 3,500

December 10
20:00

(Report)

Bayer Leverkusen (Germany)	80–82	(Italy) Benetton Treviso
Scoring by quarter: 43-44, 37-38

Wilhelm Dopatka Halle, Leverkusen
Attendance: 4,500

December 10
20:30

(Report)

Real Madrid (Spain)	85–71	(France) Pau Orthez
Scoring by quarter: 50-24, 35-47

Palacio de Deportes, Madrid
Attendance: 2,500

=== Game 6 ===
December 16–17, 1992

December 16
20:30

(Report)

Pau Orthez (France)	85–75	(Croatia) Zadar
Scoring by quarter: 50-41, 35-34

Palais des Sports, Pau
Attendance: 7,000

December 17
20:00

(Report)

Maes Pils Mechelen (Belgium)	69–77	(Germany) Bayer Leverkusen
Scoring by quarter: 37-47, 32-30

Sporthal Arena, Deurne
Attendance: 2,500

December 17
20:30

(Report)

Real Madrid (Spain)	73–69	(Spain) Estudiantes
Scoring by quarter: 31-34, 42-35

Palacio de Deportes, Madrid
Attendance: 11,000

December 17
21:35

(Report)

Olympiacos (Greece)	91–86	(Italy) Benetton Treviso
Scoring by quarter: 40-48, 51-38

Peace and Friendship Stadium, Athens
Attendance: 7,000

=== Game 7 ===
January 6 - January 7, February 23, 1993

January 6
20:30

(Report)

Estudiantes (Spain)	83–92	(Germany) Bayer Leverkusen
Scoring by quarter: 46-51, 37-41

Palacio de Deportes, Madrid
Attendance: 6,800

January 7
20:30

(Report)

Benetton Treviso (Italy)	84–65	(France) Pau Orthez
Scoring by quarter: 35-35, 49-30

Palaverde, Treviso
Attendance: 3,000

January 7
21:35

(Report)

Olympiacos (Greece)	79–60	(Belgium) Maes Pils Mechelen
Scoring by quarter: 43-35, 36-25

Peace and Friendship Stadium, Athens
Attendance: 6,500

February 23
18:00

(Report)

Zadar (Croatia)	92–90	(Spain) Real Madrid
Scoring by quarter: 45-47, 47-43

Jazine Basketball Hall, Zadar
Attendance: 1,500

=== Game 8 ===
January 13–14, 1993

January 13
19:00

(Report)

Estudiantes (Spain)	80–73	(Greece) Olympiacos
Scoring by quarter: 40-39, 40-34

Palacio de Deportes, Madrid
Attendance: 4,500

January 14
20:00

(Report)

Maes Pils Mechelen (Belgium)	73–75	(France) Pau Orthez
Scoring by quarter: 39-25, 34-50

Sporthal Arena, Deurne
Attendance: 800

January 14
20:00

(Report)

Bayer Leverkusen (Germany)	91–106	(Spain) Real Madrid
Scoring by quarter: 43-50, 48-56

Wilhelm Dopatka Halle, Leverkusen
Attendance: 5,000

January 14
20:30

(Report)

Benetton Treviso (Italy)	92–71	(Croatia) Zadar
Scoring by quarter: 45-31, 47-40

Palaverde, Treviso
Attendance: 3,000

=== Game 9 ===
January 20–21, 1993

January 20
20:30

(Report)

Pau Orthez (France)	71–68	(Spain) Estudiantes
Scoring by quarter: 39-34, 32-34

Palais des Sports, Pau
Attendance: 7,500

January 21
20:00

(Report)

Zadar (Croatia)	77–67	(Belgium) Maes Pils Mechelen
Scoring by quarter: 44-34, 33-33

Jazine Basketball Hall, Zadar
Attendance: 1,500

January 21
20:30

(Report)

Real Madrid (Spain)	83–51	(Italy) Benetton Treviso
Scoring by quarter: 33-19, 50-32

Palacio de Deportes, Madrid
Attendance: 11,000

January 21
21:35

(Report)

Olympiacos (Greece)	79–63	(Germany) Bayer Leverkusen
Scoring by quarter: 36-37, 43-26

Peace and Friendship Stadium, Athens
Attendance: 8,000

=== Game 10 ===
January 28, 1993

January 28
19:00

(Report)

Estudiantes (Spain)	106–72	(Croatia) Zadar
Scoring by quarter: 43-32, 63-40

Palacio de Deportes, Madrid
Attendance: 6,200

January 28
20:00

(Report)

Bayer Leverkusen (Germany)	73–78	(France) Pau Orthez
Scoring by quarter: 42-48, 31-30

Wilhelm Dopatka Halle, Leverkusen
Attendance: 4,500

January 28
20:30

(Report)

Benetton Treviso (Italy)	113–95	(Belgium) Maes Pils Mechelen
Scoring by quarter: 61-54, 52-41

Palaverde, Treviso
Attendance: 4,000

January 28
21:35

(Report)

Olympiacos (Greece)	63–62	(Spain) Real Madrid
Scoring by quarter: 27-35, 36-27

Peace and Friendship Stadium, Athens
Attendance: 11,000

=== Game 11 ===
February 3, 1993

February 3
18:30

(Report)

Estudiantes (Spain)	85–86	(Italy) Benetton Treviso
Scoring by quarter: 44-44, 41-42

Palacio de Deportes, Madrid
Attendance: 6,200

February 3
18:30

(Report)

Maes Pils Mechelen (Belgium)	90–98 (OT)	(Spain) Real Madrid
Scoring by quarter: 40-44, 43-39, Overtime: 7-15

Sporthal Arena, Deurne
Attendance: 2,500

February 3
20:00

(Report)

Zadar (Croatia)	71–77	(Germany) Bayer Leverkusen
Scoring by quarter: 39-38, 32-39

Jazine Basketball Hall, Zadar
Attendance: 2,000

February 3
20:30

(Report)

Pau Orthez (France)	64–65	(Greece) Olympiacos
Scoring by quarter: 36-33, 28-32

Palais des Sports, Pau
Attendance: 7,000

=== Game 12 ===
February 10–11, 1993

February 10
20:30

(Report)

Pau Orthez (France)	67–70	(Spain) Real Madrid
Scoring by quarter: 36-37, 31-33

Palais des Sports, Pau
Attendance: 8,000

February 11
18:30

(Report)

Maes Pils Mechelen (Belgium)	85–93 (OT)	(Spain) Estudiantes
Scoring by quarter: 37-55, 42-24, Overtime: 6-14

Sporthal Arena, Deurne
Attendance: 1,300

February 11
20:30

(Report)

Benetton Treviso (Italy)	98–71	(Germany) Bayer Leverkusen
Scoring by quarter: 52-38, 46-33

Palaverde, Treviso
Attendance: 5,000

February 11
21:35

(Report)

Olympiacos (Greece)	75–61	(Croatia) Zadar
Scoring by quarter: 34-26, 41-35

Peace and Friendship Stadium, Athens
Attendance: 7,000

=== Game 13 ===
February 17–18, 1993

February 17
20:00

(Report)

Bayer Leverkusen (Germany)	78–63	(Belgium) Maes Pils Mechelen
Scoring by quarter: 41-33, 37-30

Wilhelm Dopatka Halle, Leverkusen
Attendance: 4,000

February 18
19:00

(Report)

Estudiantes (Spain)	71–79	(Spain) Real Madrid
Scoring by quarter: 33-37, 38-42

Palacio de Deportes, Madrid
Attendance: 10,000

February 18
20:00

(Report)

Zadar (Croatia)	89–86	(France) Pau Orthez
Scoring by quarter: 53-44, 36-42

Jazine Basketball Hall, Zadar
Attendance: 2,000

February 18
20:30

(Report)

Benetton Treviso (Italy)	75–67	(Greece) Olympiacos
Scoring by quarter: 42-42, 33-25

Palaverde, Treviso
Attendance: 3,100

=== Game 14 ===
February 24–25, 1993

February 24
21:00

(Report)

Maes Pils Mechelen (Belgium)	66–85	(Greece) Olympiacos
Scoring by quarter: 32-38, 34-47

Sporthal Arena, Deurne
Attendance: 2,500

February 25
20:00

(Report)

Bayer Leverkusen (Germany)	92–80	(Spain) Estudiantes
Scoring by quarter: 47-39, 45-41

Wilhelm Dopatka Halle, Leverkusen
Attendance: 4,400

February 25
20:30

(Report)

Pau Orthez (France)	82–55	(Italy) Benetton Treviso
Scoring by quarter: 49-38, 33-17

Palais des Sports, Pau
Attendance: 8,000

February 25
20:30

(Report)

Real Madrid (Spain)	105–76	(Croatia) Zadar
Scoring by quarter: 48-31, 57-45

Palacio de Deportes, Madrid
Attendance: 2,500
