= 2017 European Darts Open =

Tournament information
- Dates: 30 June–2 July 2017
- Venue: Ostermann-Arena
- Location: Leverkusen, Germany
- Organisation(s): Professional Darts Corporation (PDC)
- Format: Legs; First to 6 legs
- Prize fund: £135,000
- Winner's share: £25,000
- High checkout: 161; Stephen Bunting; James Wade

Champion(s)
- Peter Wright (SCO)

The 2017 European Darts Open was the eighth of twelve PDC European Tour events on the 2017 PDC Pro Tour. The tournament took place at Ostermann-Arena, Leverkusen, Germany, from 30 June to 2 July 2017. It featured a field of 48 players and £135,000 in prize money, with £25,000 going to the winner.

Michael van Gerwen was the defending champion after defeating Peter Wright 6–5 in the final of the 2016 tournament, but lost 6–2 in the third round to Rob Cross.

Peter Wright won the tournament, defeating Mervyn King 6–2 in the final.

== Prize money ==
This is how the prize money is divided:

Stage (num. of players)		Prize money
Winner	(1)	£25,000
Runner-up	(1)	£10,000
Semi-finalists	(2)	£6,000
Quarter-finalists	(4)	£4,000
Third round losers	(8)	£3,000
Second round losers	(16)	£2,000
First round losers	(16)	£1,000
Total	£135,000	

== Qualification and format ==
The top 16 entrants from the PDC ProTour Order of Merit on 11 May automatically qualified for the event and were seeded in the second round.

The remaining 32 places went to players from five qualifying events – 18 from the UK Qualifier (held in Wigan on 16 June), eight from the West/South European Qualifier (held on 29 June), four from the Host Nation Qualifier (held on 29 June), one from the Nordic & Baltic Qualifier (held on 19 May) and one from the East European Qualifier (held on 22 June).

Adrian Lewis withdrew for health reasons the day before the event, meaning a fifth Host Nation Qualifier took his place.

On 2 July, Joe Cullen withdrew before his third round match after his father suffered a heart attack; consequently Mensur Suljović was given a bye to the quarter-finals.

The following players took part in the tournament:

Top 16
1. (Netherlands) Michael van Gerwen (third round)
2. (Scotland) Peter Wright (champion)
3. (Austria) Mensur Suljović (semi-finals)
4. (Australia) Simon Whitlock (second round)
5. (England) Michael Smith (semi-finals)
6. (Belgium) Kim Huybrechts (second round)
7. (Netherlands) Benito van de Pas (second round)
8. (Netherlands) Jelle Klaasen (second round)
9. (England) Ian White (second round)
10. (England) Dave Chisnall (quarter-finals)
11. (England) Alan Norris (third round)
12. (Northern Ireland) Daryl Gurney (third round)
13. (Wales) Gerwyn Price (quarter-finals)
14. (England) Joe Cullen (third round, withdrew)
15. (England) Stephen Bunting (third round)
16. (England) Rob Cross (quarter-finals)

UK Qualifier
- (England) James Wade (second round)
- (England) Mervyn King (runner-up)
- (Northern Ireland) Ray Campbell (first round)
- (England) Richard North (first round)
- (England) Peter Jacques (second round)
- (Australia) Kyle Anderson (first round)
- (England) ~~Adrian Lewis~~ (withdrew)
- (England) Mark Walsh (second round)
- (England) Aden Kirk (second round)
- (England) Nathan Aspinall (first round)
- (England) Matt Clark (first round)
- (England) Robbie Green (second round)
- (England) Justin Pipe (first round)
- (Scotland) John Henderson (quarter-finals)
- (Wales) Mark Webster (first round)
- (England) James Richardson (third round)
- (Scotland) Mark Barilli (first round)
- (South Africa) Devon Petersen (third round)

West/South European Qualifier
- (Netherlands) Jermaine Wattimena (first round)
- (Belgium) Dimitri Van den Bergh (third round)
- (Netherlands) Christian Kist (second round)
- (Netherlands) Jerry Hendriks (second round)
- (Netherlands) Michael Plooy (first round)
- (Spain) Cristo Reyes (first round)
- (Netherlands) Vincent van der Voort (second round)
- (Austria) Zoran Lerchbacher (first round)

Host Nation Qualifier
- (Germany) Dragutin Horvat (first round)
- (Germany) Martin Schindler (first round)
- (Germany) Christian Bunse (first round)
- (Germany) Steffen Siepmann (second round)
- (Germany) Robert Allenstein (second round)

Nordic & Baltic Qualifier
- (Finland) Kim Viljanen (first round)

East European Qualifier
- (Poland) Krzysztof Ratajski (second round)

== Draw ==
First round (best of 11 legs); 30 June
(Spain) Cristo Reyes 88.43	2
(Netherlands) Vincent van der Voort 91.96	6
(Germany) Dragutin Horvat 86.73	3
(Germany) Robert Allenstein 87.67	6
(South Africa) Devon Petersen 75.30	6
(England) Richard North 80.56	5
(England) Mervyn King 93.80	6
(Finland) Kim Viljanen 84.50	3
(Australia) Kyle Anderson 100.72	3
(England) Peter Jacques 97.79	6
(Netherlands) Jerry Hendriks 84.30	6
(Germany) Christian Bunse 84.93	4
(Belgium) Dimitri Van den Bergh 93.94	6
(England) Matt Clark 80.19	0
(England) Mark Walsh 91.81	6
(England) Nathan Aspinall 87.39	2
(England) Robbie Green 86.76	6
(Germany) Martin Schindler 87.82	5
(Netherlands) Jermaine Wattimena 87.59	5
(Germany) Steffen Siepmann 80.44	6
(Wales) Mark Webster 92.20	2
(England) James Richardson 101.24	6
(England) James Wade 90.34	6
(England) Justin Pipe 82.35	1
(Scotland) John Henderson 97.19	6
(Northern Ireland) Ray Campbell 81.58	2
(England) Aden Kirk 83.66	6
(Netherlands) Michael Plooy 88.00	5
(Netherlands) Christian Kist 90.70	6
(Austria) Zoran Lerchbacher 85.02	2
(Scotland) Mark Barilli 79.67	1
(Poland) Krzysztof Ratajski 95.97	6

Second round (best of 11 legs); 1 July
1	(Netherlands) Michael van Gerwen 96.97	6
(Netherlands) Vincent van der Voort 88.73	0
16	(England) Rob Cross 92.02	6
(Germany) Robert Allenstein 75.84	0
8	(Netherlands) Jelle Klaasen 77.14	4
(South Africa) Devon Petersen 81.16	6
9	(England) Ian White 93.91	2
(England) Mervyn King 102.49	6
5	(England) Michael Smith 91.22	6
(England) Peter Jacques 91.28	3
12	(Northern Ireland) Daryl Gurney 98.56	6
(Netherlands) Jerry Hendriks 85.80	5
4	(Australia) Simon Whitlock 95.15	5
(Belgium) Dimitri Van den Bergh 95.98	6
13	(Wales) Gerwyn Price 88.65	6
(England) Mark Walsh 85.20	4
2	(Scotland) Peter Wright 98.12	6
(England) Robbie Green 93.12	1
15	(England) Stephen Bunting 86.64	6
(Germany) Steffen Siepmann 83.08	4
7	(Netherlands) Benito van de Pas 91.72	5
(England) James Richardson 96.95	6
10	(England) Dave Chisnall 100.04	6
(England) James Wade 98.89	2
6	(Belgium) Kim Huybrechts 92.64	4
(Scotland) John Henderson 95.38	6
11	(England) Alan Norris 93.02	6
(England) Aden Kirk 85.36	2
3	(Austria) Mensur Suljović 86.16	6
(Netherlands) Christian Kist 87.93	4
14	(England) Joe Cullen 99.56	6
(Poland) Krzysztof Ratajski 96.99	2

Third round (best of 11 legs); 2 July
1	(Netherlands) van Gerwen 102.92	2
16	(England) Cross 102.30	6
(South Africa) Petersen 91.20	3
(England) King 102.95	6
5	(England) Smith 104.37	6
12	(Northern Ireland) Gurney 96.63	3
(Belgium) Van den Bergh 93.52	3
13	(Wales) Price 93.34	6
2	(Scotland) Wright 95.55	6
15	(England) Bunting 94.16	3
(England) Richardson 93.57	3
10	(England) Chisnall 100.85	6
(Scotland) Henderson 92.79	6
11	(England) Norris 90.52	5
3	(Austria) Suljović	w/o
14	(England) Cullen	w/d

Quarter-finals (best of 11 legs); 2 July
16	(England) Cross 94.06	2
(England) King 96.90	6
5	(England) Smith 96.80	6
13	(Wales) Price 95.42	4
2	(Scotland) Wright 96.53	6
10	(England) Chisnall 95.20	1
(Scotland) Henderson 92.34	2
3	(Austria) Suljović 97.26	6

Semi-finals (best of 11 legs); 2 July
(England) King 96.58	6
5	(England) Smith 94.61	4
2	(Scotland) Wright 99.95	6
3	(Austria) Suljović 90.39	3

Final (best of 11 legs); 2 July
(England) King 92.42	2
2	(Scotland) Wright 103.07	6
