= 2018 European Championship (darts) =

2018 Unibet European Championship

Tournament information
- Dates: 25–28 October 2018
- Venue: Westfalenhallen
- Location: Dortmund
- Country: Germany
- Organisation(s): PDC
- Format: Legs
- Prize fund: £400,000
- Winner's share: £100,000
- High checkout: 170 (Netherlands) Michael van Gerwen (first round)

Champion(s)
- (England) James Wade

The 2018 Unibet European Championship was the eleventh edition of the Professional Darts Corporation's European Championship tournament, which saw the top players from the thirteen European tour events compete against each other. The tournament took place from 25 to 28 October 2018 at the Westfalenhallen in Dortmund, Germany.

Michael van Gerwen was the four-time defending champion, after defeating Rob Cross 11–7 in the 2017 final. However, he lost against Steve West 7–10 in the second round, ending a 21-game unbeaten run. It meant that Phil Taylor still holds the record of the longest unbeaten run in this tournament (22 matches). Van Gerwen's win against Paul Nicholson marked the last time the tournament's defending champion won their first round match until Gian van Veen defeated Andrew Gilding at the 2026 edition.

For the first time in the history of this tournament, no Dutch player reached the quarter-finals.

James Wade became European Champion for the first time and won his first ranking major since 2011 after beating Simon Whitlock 11–8 in the final.

== Prize money ==
The 2018 European Championship will have a total prize fund of £400,000, equal the amount of the last staging of the tournament. The following is the breakdown of the fund:

Position (no. of players)		Prize money (Total: £400,000)
Winner	(1)	£100,000
Runner-up	(1)	£40,000
Semi-finalists	(2)	£20,000
Quarter-finalists	(4)	£15,000
Last 16 (second round)	(8)	£10,000
Last 32 (first round)	(16)	£5,000

== Qualification ==
The 2018 tournament continues the new system in terms of qualification with the two previous editions: The top 32 players from the European Tour Order of Merit, which is solely based on prize money won in the thirteen European tour events during the season, qualifying for the tournament.

In a change from previous years, the draw was done in a fixed bracket by their seeded order with the top qualifier playing the 32nd, the second playing the 31st and so on.

The following players will take part in the tournament:

1. (Netherlands) Michael van Gerwen (second round)
2. (Austria) Mensur Suljović (first round)
3. (Wales) Gerwyn Price (quarter-finals)
4. (England) Ian White (first round)
5. (England) Joe Cullen (semi-finals)
6. (England) James Wade (champion)
7. (Germany) Max Hopp (semi-finals)
8. (Australia) Simon Whitlock (runner-up)
9. (Scotland) Peter Wright (second round)
10. (Wales) Jonny Clayton (first round)
11. (Northern Ireland) Daryl Gurney (first round)
12. (England) Michael Smith (second round)
13. (England) Rob Cross (quarter-finals)
14. (England) Adrian Lewis (first round)
15. (England) Darren Webster (quarter-finals)
16. (England) Steve West (quarter-finals)
17. (England) Mervyn King (first round)
18. (England) Stephen Bunting (first round)
19. (England) Dave Chisnall (second round)
20. (Netherlands) Danny Noppert (first round)
21. (Republic of Ireland) Steve Lennon (first round)
22. (England) Ricky Evans (second round)
23. (England) James Wilson (second round)
24. (Netherlands) Jermaine Wattimena (first round)
25. (England) Steve Beaton (first round)
26. (Republic of Ireland) William O'Connor (first round)
27. (Germany) Martin Schindler (first round)
28. (Netherlands) Jelle Klaasen (first round)
29. (England) Richard North (second round)
30. (Australia) Kyle Anderson (first round)
31. (Spain) Cristo Reyes (second round)
32. (Australia) Paul Nicholson (first round)

== Draw ==
First round (best of 11 legs); 25–26 October
1	(Netherlands) Michael van Gerwen 110.32	6
32	(Australia) Paul Nicholson 96.45	2
16	(England) Steve West 94.15	6
17	(England) Mervyn King 92.53	5
8	(Australia) Simon Whitlock 101.16	6
25	(England) Steve Beaton 95.93	3
9	(Scotland) Peter Wright 101.33	6
24	(Netherlands) Jermaine Wattimena 91.57	0
5	(England) Joe Cullen 94.76	6
28	(Netherlands) Jelle Klaasen 89.71	2
12	(England) Michael Smith 100.76	6
21	(Republic of Ireland) Steve Lennon 96.60	3
4	(England) Ian White 88.94	1
29	(England) Richard North 93.22	6
13	(England) Rob Cross 97.17	6
20	(Netherlands) Danny Noppert 92.17	4
2	(Austria) Mensur Suljović 89.23	3
31	(Spain) Cristo Reyes 90.90	6
15	(England) Darren Webster 99.38	6
18	(England) Stephen Bunting 96.79	5
7	(Germany) Max Hopp 91.28	6
26	(Republic of Ireland) William O'Connor 86.92	1
10	(Wales) Jonny Clayton 91.06	2
23	(England) James Wilson 103.64	6
6	(England) James Wade 91.77	6
27	(Germany) Martin Schindler 84.35	3
11	(Northern Ireland) Daryl Gurney 97.20	4
22	(England) Ricky Evans 94.83	6
3	(Wales) Gerwyn Price 92.34	6
30	(Australia) Kyle Anderson 101.09	4
14	(England) Adrian Lewis 90.53	5
19	(England) Dave Chisnall 97.94	6

Second round (best of 19 legs); 26–27 October
1	(Netherlands) Michael van Gerwen 95.27	7
16	(England) Steve West 96.06	10
8	(Australia) Simon Whitlock 89.83	10
9	(Scotland) Peter Wright 86.82	6
5	(England) Joe Cullen 94.02	10
12	(England) Michael Smith 91.92	4
29	(England) Richard North 89.47	2
13	(England) Rob Cross 93.06	10
31	(Spain) Cristo Reyes 91.74	9
15	(England) Darren Webster 91.84	10
7	(Germany) Max Hopp 92.59	10
23	(England) James Wilson 90.83	7
6	(England) James Wade 94.40	10
22	(England) Ricky Evans 91.77	5
3	(Wales) Gerwyn Price 95.19	10
19	(England) Dave Chisnall 94.82	5

Quarter-finals (best of 19 legs); 28 October
16	(England) Steve West 101.67	7
8	(Australia) Simon Whitlock 100.27	10
5	(England) Joe Cullen 90.79	10
13	(England) Rob Cross 93.83	8
15	(England) Darren Webster 95.27	5
7	(Germany) Max Hopp 94.80	10
6	(England) James Wade 95.80	10
3	(Wales) Gerwyn Price 91.14	9

Semi-finals (best of 21 legs); 28 October
8	(Australia) Simon Whitlock 90.19	11
5	(England) Joe Cullen 87.07	10
7	(Germany) Max Hopp 93.90	10
6	(England) James Wade 93.91	11

Final (best of 21 legs); 28 October
8	(Australia) Simon Whitlock 88.81	8
6	(England) James Wade 91.44	11
