= James Wade =

English darts player (born 1983)

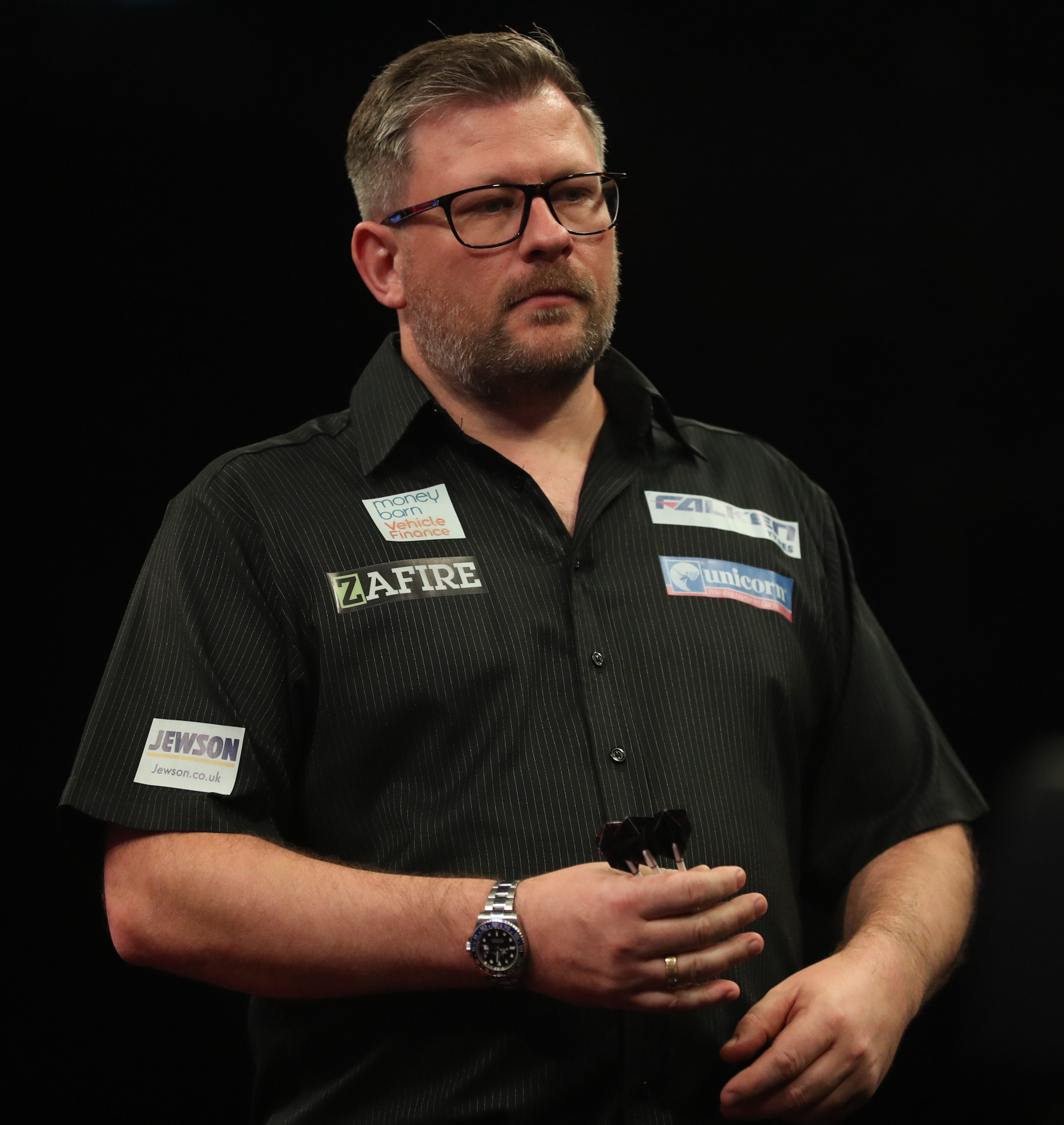
- Wade in 2022

Personal information
- Full name: James Martin Wade
- Nickname: "The Machine"
- Born: 6 April 1983 (age 43) Ash, Surrey, England
- Home town: Aldershot, England

Sport
- Sport: Darts
- Playing since: 1997
- Darts: 20g Unicorn Signature
- Laterality: Left-handed
- Walk-on music: "I'm Still Standing" by Elton John

Organisation (see split in darts)
- BDO: 2001–2004
- PDC: 2004–present (Tour Card: 2011–present)
- Current world ranking: (PDC) 7 (5 November 2026)

WDF major events – best performances
- World Championship: Last 16: 2004
- World Masters: Last 64: 2002, 2003
- World Trophy: Last 16: 2003
- Int. Darts League: Quarter-final: 2004, 2007
- Finder Masters: Last 16 Group: 2002

PDC premier events – best performances
- World Championship: Semi-final: 2009, 2012, 2013, 2022
- World Matchplay: Winner (1): 2007
- World Grand Prix: Winner (2): 2007, 2010
- UK Open: Winner (3): 2008, 2011, 2021
- Grand Slam: Runner-up: 2010, 2016, 2020
- European Championship: Winner (1): 2018
- Premier League: Winner (1): 2009
- Championship League: Winner (1): 2010
- Desert Classic: Runner-up: 2008
- PC Finals: Semi-final: 2009
- Masters: Winner (1): 2014
- Champions League: Semi-final: 2016
- World Series Finals: Winner (1): 2018

Other tournament wins
- Years
PDC Pro Tour (×28)
European Tour (×3): 2014 Gibraltar Darts Trophy; 2016 European Darts Matchplay; 2026 Flanders Darts Trophy
Players Championships (×20): 2008 (×3); 2009 (×3); 2010 (×1); 2011 (×2); 2014 (×1); 2015 (×2); 2019 (×5); 2022 (×1); 2025 (×1); 2026 (×1)
UK Open Qualifiers/Regional Finals (×5): 2007 (×1); 2008 (×2) (Note: Both 2008 UK Open Regional Finals were held in 2007.); 2009 (×1); 2010 (×1)
World Series of Darts (×1)
2026 Australian Darts Masters

Other achievements
- 2006 PDC Young Player of the Year; 2007 PDC Player of the Year; 2008 PDC Player of the Year and PDPA Players' Player of the Year

James Martin Wade (born 6 April 1983) is an English professional darts player who competes in Professional Darts Corporation (PDC) events, where he is ranked world number seven; he reached a peak ranking of world number two in 2010. Widely regarded as one of the greatest ever darts players to have never won a world championship and the greatest left-hander in the history of the sport, Wade is a four-time PDC World Championship semi-finalist and eleven-time PDC major winner, placing him fourth in the all-time list behind Phil Taylor, Michael van Gerwen and Luke Littler.

Wade started his career in the British Darts Organisation (BDO) in 2001 before joining the Professional Darts Corporation (PDC) in 2004. His best performance in a major BDO tournament came at the International Darts League in 2004 and 2007, reaching the quarter-finals on both occasions. He became the then-youngest player to win a PDC major title when he won the World Matchplay in 2007 at age 24. His other PDC major wins include three UK Opens, two World Grand Prix titles, and the 2009 Premier League. Wade has won a total of 42 PDC titles in his professional career.

== Early career ==
Wade first took playing darts seriously at the age of 14 and won the Basingstoke Open, his first competitive event and went on to compete for England at youth level. He reached the final of the British Classic in 2001 at the age of 18, losing to John Walton and the following year he won the Swiss Open. Wade made his television debut at the 2003 BDO World Championship, but lost 2–3 in the first round to Dennis Harbour having missed eight darts to win the match in the fourth set. In other BDO Open events during 2003, he reached the Norway Open final, Belgian Open semi-finals and Dutch Open quarter-finals.

At the 2004 BDO World Championship, he beat Shaun Greatbatch 3–0 in the first round, before losing to Darryl Fitton. Later in 2004, he reached a series of quarter-finals including the German Open, the Isle of Man Open and the prestigious International Darts League in May – which was his last tournament as a BDO affiliated player.

== Career ==
=== PDC switch ===
In May 2004, Wade took the decision to forfeit his automatic place in the 2004 World Darts Trophy and 2005 BDO World Championship to join the Professional Darts Corporation (PDC). His first PDC major was the 2004 UK Open, where he was edged out 8–7 in the fourth round by Colin Lloyd. He came through the World Championship Qualifiers to make his PDC World Darts Championship debut in 2005, losing 3–0 in the first round to Mark Holden. Wade bounced back from this to win the Irish Masters and moved closer to the top 32 in the world for the first time. He lost 11–4 to Peter Manley in the last 16 of the UK Open and 3–1 against Roland Scholten in the last 16 of the Las Vegas Desert Classic (after beating the experienced Ronnie Baxter in the prior round). In his second World Championship appearance he lost again in the first round, this time 3–2 to Wayne Jones, despite having won the first six legs for a two-set lead.

=== Major breakthrough ===
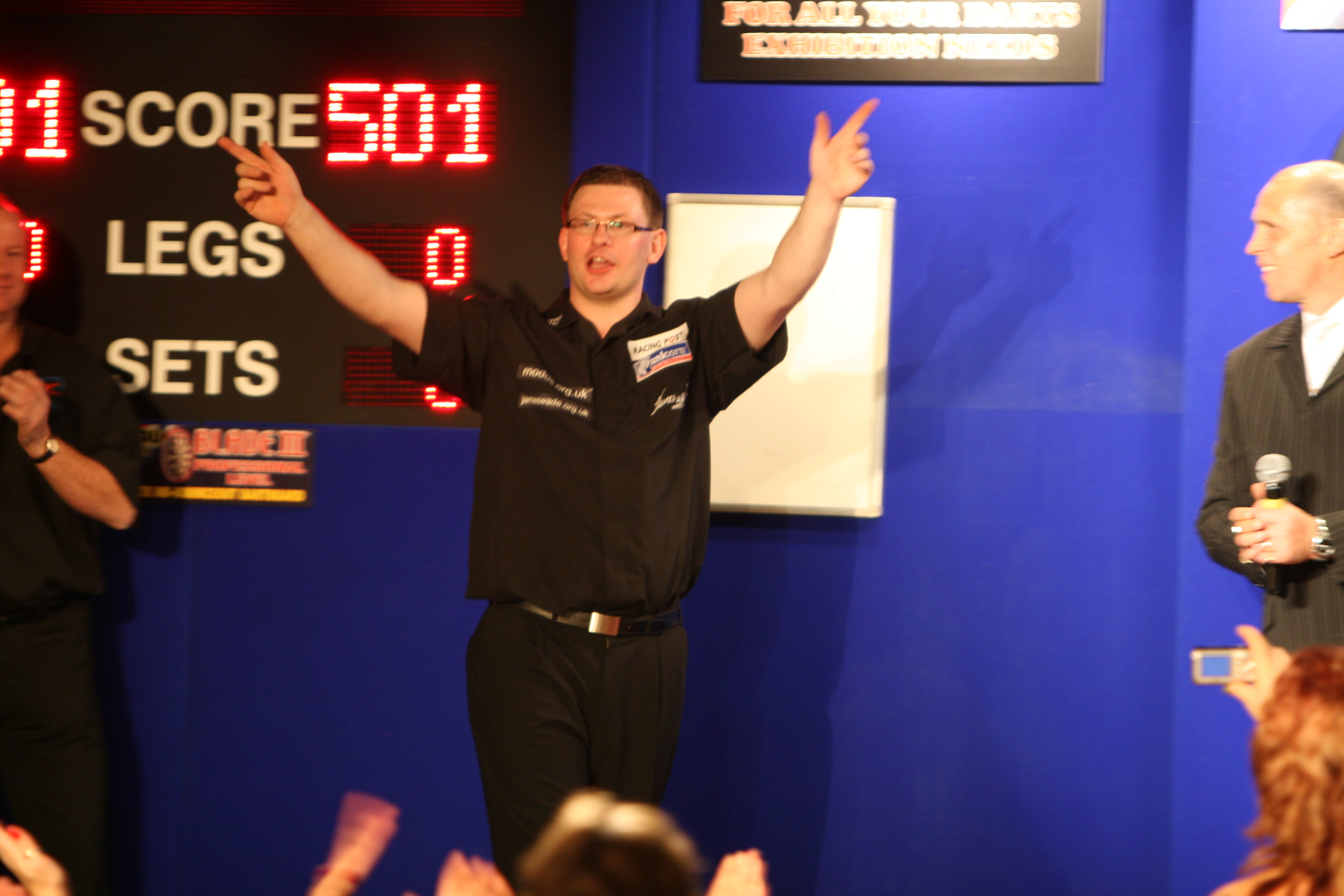
Wade in 2007

Wade hit two nine-dart finishes in the early part of 2006, but when he was defeated in the qualifiers for the Las Vegas Desert Classic he decided to give up his job as a mechanic and become a full-time darts professional. The results of this were evident almost immediately as he made his major breakthrough on television during the 2006 World Matchplay in July. He sensationally reached the final, seeing off four experienced players in his first ever appearance at the Winter Gardens. Wade beat Denis Ovens in the first round 10–1, having had darts to make it a 10–0 whitewash, 2004 World Championship finalist Kevin Painter 13–9 in the second round, ending one leg with two double 20's to cause a minor controversy, and beat Chris Mason 16–4 in his quarter-final. In the semi-finals he came back from 1–5 down to beat Roland Scholten 19–17 in extra legs, as a player is required to win the match by two clear legs in the Matchplay. In the final he played Phil Taylor but despite being 8–5 up, he lost 18–11. In the rest of 2006 in the non-televised events he reached three semi-finals and a final, before he won the Vauxhall Men's Singles by defeating Ronnie Baxter 5–3 in the final, having hit his third nine-darter of the year in the semi-finals of the event.

Wade won his first matches in the PDC World Championship in 2007 by beating Warren French and Dave Ladley to reach the last 16, where Terry Jenkins was a 4–3 victor. He was then awarded with the PDC's Young Player of the Year and his world ranking had climbed to number 11.

He then returned to Blackpool for the 2007 World Matchplay and claimed the title – his first major televised tournament success and became the youngest player ever to win a PDC televised event in doing so. His route to the title and £50,000 cheque saw him beat Wayne Jones, Dennis Priestley, Mervyn King, Adrian Lewis and Terry Jenkins in the final. Although Wade's victory was nothing short of emphatic over the ever-tenacious Jenkins, many believe his semi-final victory over Lewis was one of the finest performances ever seen at the Winter Gardens. Both players averaged 101, but it was Wade's finishing, as he checked out almost 70% of his doubles, which saw him triumph 17–7. His 18–7 win over Jenkins in the final saw him move up to world number three. Wade also won the next PDC major tournament – the World Grand Prix in Dublin in October beating van Barneveld by 5 sets to 1 in the semi-finals and once again denying Jenkins his first major title in the final by winning 6–3. These successes saw Wade being crowned the 2007 PDC Player of the Year and PDPA Players' Player of the Year.

At the 2008 World Championship Wade reached the quarter-finals and was defeated 5 sets to 4 in a close encounter against John Part, who went on to win the tournament. Wade made his debut in the Premier League as he was in the top four of the Order of Merit and on the opening night became the first player to defeat Taylor in the tournament's three-year history, winning the match 8 legs to 6. Taylor however exacted revenge with a 16–8 victory in the final on 26 May 2008 after Wade had defeated van Barneveld in the semi-finals. Incredibly, Wade claimed his third major title in a year at the UK Open, by beating American Gary Mawson 11–7 in the final. The following month, he reached the finals of the Las Vegas Desert Classic, losing 13–7 to Taylor. Then in July he reached his third World Matchplay final in a row, losing for the second time in three years in the final to Taylor 18–9, making this the third major final loss of the year against Taylor. In the defence of his World Grand Prix title he lost to Tony Eccles in the first round. He returned to form to claim two Players Championship titles in the autumn and also hit his first televised nine-darter in a second round loss to Gary Anderson at the Grand Slam of Darts.

In the 2009 World Championship, Wade went a stage further than the previous year, reaching the semi-finals where he lost 4–6 to Raymond van Barneveld. Wade won the 2009 Premier League Darts tournament, defeating Mervyn King 13–8 at the Wembley Arena. However, he failed to defend his UK Open title in 2009 after losing to Peter Manley 9–8 in the third round. He then failed to reach the World Matchplay final for the first time, losing in the quarter-finals to Ronnie Baxter.

Wade lost to an on-fire Simon Whitlock in the quarter-finals of the 2010 World Championship. Whitlock won 5–3 in sets.

Defending his Premier League title, Wade reached the final of the 2010 Premier League, where he played against Phil Taylor. Taylor won 10–8, hitting two nine-dart finishes during the match.

Wade won the 2010 World Grand Prix, beating Adrian Lewis 6–3 in the final. Four days later, he won his second major tournament inside a week by defeating Taylor 6–5 in the 2010 Championship League Darts final.

Wade reached another major final in 2010 at the Grand Slam, seeing both Mervyn King and Terry Jenkins squander match darts against him before Wade himself threw away an 8–0 lead against BDO player Scott Waites in the final, as Waites came back to win 16–12.

=== 2011 season ===
Wade was the number two seed for the 2011 World Championship due to his World Grand Prix and Champions League Darts victories. However, Wade was beaten by world number 47 Mensur Suljović 4–2 in the second round. He got off to a poor start in the Premier League of Darts losing 8–3 to an on form Mark Webster he went on to defeat World Champion Adrian Lewis 8–6 in week 2 and then lost 8–5 to Simon Whitlock; during the match he took some stick from the Belfast crowd. He regained some form in the latter weeks of the League drawing with Raymond Van Barneveld 7–7 while averaging over 100. In June he won his 7th major title at the 2011 UK Open after an 11–8 win against Wes Newton. At the 2011 World Matchplay, he reached his fourth final and third against Phil Taylor. Wade beat Raymond van Barneveld and Adrian Lewis en route, before losing to Taylor in the final 18–8.

=== 2012 ===
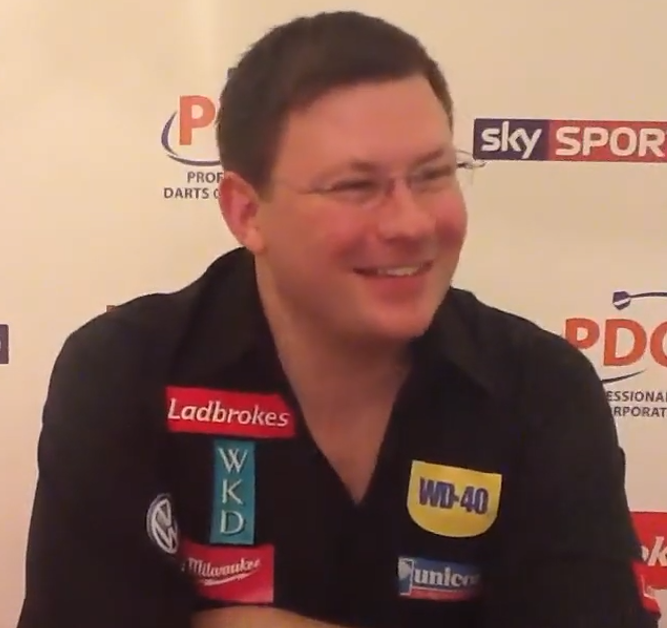
Wade at the 2012 PDC World Darts Championship

Wade dropped just one set to reach the quarter-finals of the 2012 World Championship, but was then involved in two of the best games ever witnessed at the event. He played John Part in the last 8 and raced into a 3–1 lead before the Canadian won three sets in a row. Wade took the game into a deciding set and the players broke each other's throws twice to require a sudden-death leg, which he managed to win by taking out 85 with Part on 40. He played defending champion Adrian Lewis in the semi-finals and looked to be heading for his first PDC World final as he led 5–1. Lewis pulled a set back, before Wade had a dart at double 18 to win the match. He missed and it proved to be a pivotal moment as Lewis took the set and reeled off 10 straight legs to complete a sensational comeback 5–6. Despite the loss, Wade moved up to third in the PDC Order of Merit overtaking Gary Anderson.

Wade once again gained automatic entry for the Premier League due to his Order of Merit ranking. He lost his first three matches, before winning the next three and went into the final game of the season knowing a win over Raymond van Barneveld would guarantee him a spot in the play-offs. Wade drew the match 7–7, but due to other results going his way he still qualified for the play-offs by finishing 4th in the league. He played Phil Taylor in the semi-finals, against whom he suffered heavy 2–8 and 1–8 defeats during the league campaign. The semi-final, however, was much closer as Wade led 4–2 in the opening stages, before the score became 6–6. Taylor then took out a 149 finish, with Wade on 57, to break and then closed out the match 8–6.

Wade beat Richie Burnett, Mark Walsh, Michael van Gerwen and Terry Jenkins to reach his fifth World Matchplay final and his fourth against Phil Taylor. Wade trailed 10–14, but hit back to 14–15 and then missed a dart at double 10 to level the game. He went on to lose 15–18, stating after the match that winning 15 legs against Taylor whilst playing "half-mast" was a good achievement and that he had never felt so happy playing darts. However, during his first round defeat to Colin Osborne in the World Grand Prix, Wade appeared visibly unsettled and immediately flew back home to receive treatment for bipolar disorder, with which he was diagnosed in 2010. He released a statement to thank fans for their support and did not play again until the Grand Slam of Darts, where he finished third in his group following one win and two defeats. After all 33 ProTour events of 2012 had been played, Wade finished 12th on the Order of Merit to qualify for the Players Championship Finals. He lost to Brendan Dolan 4–6 in the first round.

=== 2013 ===
At the 2013 World Championship, Wade beat Peter Hudson 3–0, Steve Beaton 4–2 and Vincent van der Voort 4–0 and then edged past Wes Newton 5–4 in the quarter-finals. He was 1–3 down to Michael van Gerwen in the semi-finals, who then hit a nine dart finish and was a double 12 away from becoming the first player to hit successive perfect legs. However, Wade won the set and then levelled the game at 3–3. Despite averaging 10 points lower than his opponent, which included hitting one 180 to van Gerwen's 14, Wade stayed in the match by taking out finishes at crucial times. But the pressure exerted on Wade eventually showed as he lost 4–6. Wade's best performance of the league stage of the Premier League came in week five when he averaged 105.73 during a 7–1 win over Robert Thornton, who had not lost any of his first four matches. Despite losing three matches in a row he went into the final night needing a positive result against Phil Taylor to qualify for the play-offs. He managed a 6–6 draw and after other results were favourable for Wade he finished fourth in the league to play van Gerwen in the semi-finals, who he had beaten 7–4 and lost to 5–7 during the league campaign. Wade uncharacteristically missed a plethora of darts at doubles, hitting just 20% during the match and, despite a brief fightback from 2–7 down, he would lose 4–8.

Wade played in six of the eight UK Open Qualifiers but could not advance beyond the last 16 in any of them to finish a lowly 61st on the Order of Merit, which meant he would enter the UK Open itself in the preliminary round. He had six comfortable wins to advance to the quarter-finals. He played Andy Hamilton and in a tight match he lost 8–10. Wade played Phil Taylor once again in the World Matchplay, this time in the semi-finals, and was beaten 12–17.

On 20 August, Wade was banned by the PDC for four tournaments regarding his behavior at recent Pro Tour events. He was found to have "acted in a manner which may reasonably be considered to injure or discredit the Darts Regulation Authority or bring the game into disrepute". Wade was free to return at the German Darts Masters in September. In October Wade reached the semi-finals of the World Grand Prix, where he lost 5–1 to Phil Taylor, extending his winless run against Taylor to 18 matches. Taylor remarked afterwards: "James didn't click. He was gone. It's the first time I've ever seen him gone. He told me afterwards that he just gave up." At the inaugural Masters Wade fought a partisan crowd to come back from 7–4 behind in the quarter-finals against Simon Whitlock to finish 91 on the bullseye in the deciding leg to win 8–7. Wade, whose ranking has now dropped to world number six, stated that he wanted to prove that he should be back in the top four. Early on in the semi-final his opponent Taylor threw a broken flight from the stage, with Wade then asking for it back before complaining to match officials. Wade asked the referee to forfeit the match and lost 10–1 with an average of 73.99. Wade returned to win all three of his group games at the Grand Slam of Darts and then cruised past Paul Nicholson 10–1 to face Taylor yet again. The meeting looked to be heading in a similar manner to Wade's recent heavy defeats as he trailed 9–2, but he then won five unanswered legs before missing three darts to reduce his deficit to only one. This was as close as he could get to Taylor and he went on to lose 16–12.

=== 2014 ===
Wade rode his luck at the 2014 World Championship as Darren Webster missed six match darts in the first round and Andy Smith missed two in the second. Nevertheless, Wade advanced to the quarter-finals but was comfortably beaten 5–1 by Adrian Lewis as he missed 34 darts at doubles during the match. As he was outside the top four on the Order of Merit, Wade had no guarantee he would be involved in the 2014 Premier League and he did not receive a wildcard from the PDC or Sky Sports which saw him miss the event for the first time since 2007. PDC chairman Barry Hearn explained the decision was made to give Wade a rest to enable him more time to gain treatment for his health issues, but Wade released a statement the following day, describing the omission as "devastating" as he was "one of the four most consistent players in 2013". Wade also said he didn't ask to be left out and didn't decline an invitation, and that, with regards the reason given by Hearn that he could gain treatment for his bipolar disorder, "no medical professional has suggested I take a break".

At the UK Open, Wade eliminated Michael Mansell and Kim Huybrechts, before being edged out 9–8 in the fifth round by Terry Jenkins. At the Dubai Duty Free Darts Masters he led world number one Michael van Gerwen 5–3, but was eliminated in a deciding leg 10–9. Wade reached his first final in almost two years at the 12th Players Championship of 2014 by defeating Van Gerwen 6–4 in the semi-finals, but then lost 6–3 to Simon Whitlock. Later in the month he won his first title since October 2011 by coming back from 4–1 down to beat Steve Beaton 6–4 in the final of the Gibraltar Darts Trophy, stating afterwards that the success meant more to him than of his televised wins as he was unsure if he was still capable of winning tournaments. Wade could not advance to the semi-finals of the World Matchplay for the first time since 2009 as he lost in the quarters 16–10 to Whitlock.

Wade's match against Robert Thornton in the second round of the World Grand Prix is regarded as the best in the tournament's history. At 1–0 up in sets, Wade opened the next with the second ever double-start nine-dart finish and threw a 156 finish in the leg after. However, he went on to lose the set and the following one, before Thornton incredibly threw the game's second nine-darter to become the first players to have thrown a perfect leg in the same match in darts history. Thornton would miss four darts to win 3–1, with the tie instead going into a deciding set which Wade took to advance to the quarter-finals. Wade continued his run by beating Phil Taylor for the first time in a major knockout tournament and reached the final by fighting back from 3–1 down against Gary Anderson to win 4–3. Wade paid the price for missing doubles against Michael van Gerwen including three to win both the fifth and seventh sets as he fell short of claiming a hat-trick of Grand Prix titles with a 5–3 defeat. The following week, Wade won the 17th Players Championship by fighting back from 5–3 behind to beat Kim Huybrechts 6–5. He was denied a weekend double 24 hours later as Van Gerwen beat him 6–2 in the final of the 18th event.

Wade beat Taylor in a major event for the second time inside a month in the semi-finals of the Masters 11–9 with an average of 105.56. Wade started the final poorly, to fall 5–0, 6–1, 9–2 and 10–6 behind against Mervyn King, but incredibly King would miss a total of eight match darts, as Wade won the last five legs of the match to defeat King 11–10 and take his first major title for three years. Wade hit a 135 checkout in the last leg. The comeback was later named the televised performance of the year at the PDC's annual awards dinner.

=== 2015 ===
Wade suffered a 4–1 defeat to Stephen Bunting in the second round of the 2015 World Championship and he lost 9–6 against Andrew Gilding in the fifth round of the UK Open. He lost in the final of the first Players Championship event 6–5 to Gary Anderson, but returned to claim the second event a day later by beating Peter Wright 6–5. He threw a nine-dart finish in the final of the sixth event to level the scores at 2–2 with Van Gerwen, but lost 6–5 and was narrowly edged out by the same scoreline in the final of the next event this time to Wright. In both events he never had a dart for the title. On his return to the Premier League, Wade could only win three of his 16 matches to finish seventh. His second Players Championship title of the year came at the 13th event in July as he recovered from 3–1 and 5–3 down against Kim Huybrechts in the final to win 6–5.

In the semi-finals of the World Matchplay, Wade ended Phil Taylor's 38 match winning streak in the event stretching back to 2007 by beating him 17–14. He lost in the final for the fifth time this time 18–12 to Van Gerwen. Wade played Taylor in the final of the Perth Darts Masters and lost 11–7. He suffered a surprise 2–1 defeat to Mensur Suljović in the first round of the World Grand Prix. In October, Wade won through to the final of the 20th Players Championship and in doing so became the second player to reach 100 quarter-finals on the Pro Tour. He lost 6–2 to Gary Anderson. Wade was knocked out in the second round of the European Championship, Grand Slam and Players Championship Finals.

=== 2016 ===
Wade won three matches without losing a set to reach the quarter-finals of the 2016 World Championship, but was comfortably beaten 5–1 by Gary Anderson. He lost 6–1 to Anderson in the final of the fourth UK Open Qualifier and 9–2 to Mensur Suljović in the third round of the main event. In the deciding leg of the sixth Players Championship final Josh Payne took out 116 with Wade waiting on tops to beat him 6–5. He became the first player to defeat Michael van Gerwen in the European Tour events this season when he overcame him 6–2 in the semi-finals of the European Darts Matchplay and he claimed the title with a 6–5 win, after Dave Chisnall had missed one championship dart. Wade lost in the final of the Shanghai Darts Masters 8–3 to Van Gerwen.

Wade failed to get to at least the quarter-finals of the World Matchplay in his 11th appearance at the event when he lost 10–5 in the opening round to Mervyn King. In the inaugural staging of the Champions League of Darts, Wade was eliminated in the semi-finals 11–3 by Phil Taylor. Whilst at the event Wade broke the Guinness World Records title for the most darts in the inner and outer bullseyes in one minute with 15. He lost 2–1 in a deciding leg to Terry Jenkins in the first round of the World Grand Prix and 11–7 in the semi-finals of the European Championship to Van Gerwen. Wade played in his only major final of the year at the Grand Slam, by beating Anderson 16–14, but Van Gerwen won 10 of the final 13 legs to defeat Wade 16–8.

=== 2017 ===
Wade fought back from 3–1 down against Michael Smith in the third round of the 2017 World Championship before triumphing 4–3, winning the last seven legs of the match to reach the quarter-finals. He was then defeated 5–3 by Peter Wright. Wade suffered early exits at the Masters, the 2017 Premier League Darts, and the World Matchplay, resulting in a decade-low ranking of 10th. Wade's hugely disappointing year continued with yet another first round defeat, this time at the hands of Steve West at the World Grand Prix. Wade's Grand Slam campaign saw him win through his group, defeating Phil Taylor along the way. He was beaten in the second round by Daryl Gurney. Wade defeated Kevin Painter and Jamie Caven 6–4, in the first and second rounds of the Players Championship Finals, respectively. In the third round, Wade saw off Ian White 10–6. Wade lost 10–6 at the Quarter Final stage to Rob Cross.

=== 2018 ===
Wade suffered a poor showing in the 2018 World Championship, losing 2–3 to Keegan Brown in the first round. Wade defeated Simon Whitlock 10–8 in the first round of the Masters before losing to Michael van Gerwen 10–2 in the Quarter-Finals. Wade was not involved in the 2018 Premier League Darts for the first time since 2014. Wade ended his short stint outside the world's top 10 dart players, making good runs in European tour and players championship events away from the TV screens. Wade hit an 8th career 9-darter in a Pro-tour match against Michael Smith. Throughout the year, Wade had some really good runs on the European Tour reaching the final twice losing both to Michael van Gerwen 8–3. Late in the year, Wade clinched the 9th major tournament of his career winning the 2018 European Championship (darts) for the very first time, defeating Simon Whitlock 11–8 in the final, having already defeated Martin Schindler, Ricky Evans, Gerwyn Price and Max Hopp in the previous rounds. It was Wade's first major since 2014 and his first ranking major since 2011, propelling him back in to the world's elite top 6. Wade dedicated his title and upturn in form to his new-born son, Arthur, also stating he was "dangerous" again and that the rest of the field should "look out".

At the World Series of Darts Finals, Wade defeated debutant Ross Smith 6–3 in the first round. He then defeated hometown favorite Mensur Suljović 6–3 in the second round and Jamie Lewis 10–5 in the Quarter-Finals, continuing his excellent stretch of form. It was the first time since 2011 that Wade won 8 consecutive TV major matches. In the Semi-Finals, Wade dispatched 5-time World Champion Raymond van Barneveld 11–2 in a high quality affair in which Wade averaged 100 and hit 65% of his doubles. This win stretched Wade's unbeaten TV run to 9 matches, the first time he had achieved this feat since 2008. In the Final, Wade played Michael Smith. Wade got off to a 3-leg advantage but Smith would peg him back to 5–5 before the second break. Wade would go onto break Smith in the 19th leg to serve the title out at 10–9 but he busted his score of 121, and Smith eventually came back and won the leg. In the decider, Smith missed 5 match darts and Wade sealed the title on D18. The tournament victory was Wade's second major in 7 days, and the 10th of his career. Wade's tournament victories sealed his place in the 2018 Grand Slam of Darts where he drew Keegan Brown, Mark Webster and Wesley Harms to comprise Group C. Wade won his opening group match, whitewashing BDO player Wesley Harms 5–0 with a 99 average. In his second group game, Wade defeated Keegan Brown 5–3, averaging 105. In doing so, Wade set a new personal record of 12 TV major wins in succession. Wade defeated Mark Webster 5–1 with a 102 average in the final group match to top the group, extending his unbeaten run to 13 matches and setting up a Round of 16 showdown with Michael Unterbuchner. Wade lost, rather surprisingly, to Michael Unterbuchner 10–6.

Wade beat Ross Smith 6–4 in the first round of the 2018 Players Championship Finals. He then overcame Nathan Aspinall 6–4 in the second round before losing out to Chris Dobey 10–9 in the round of 16.

=== 2019 ===
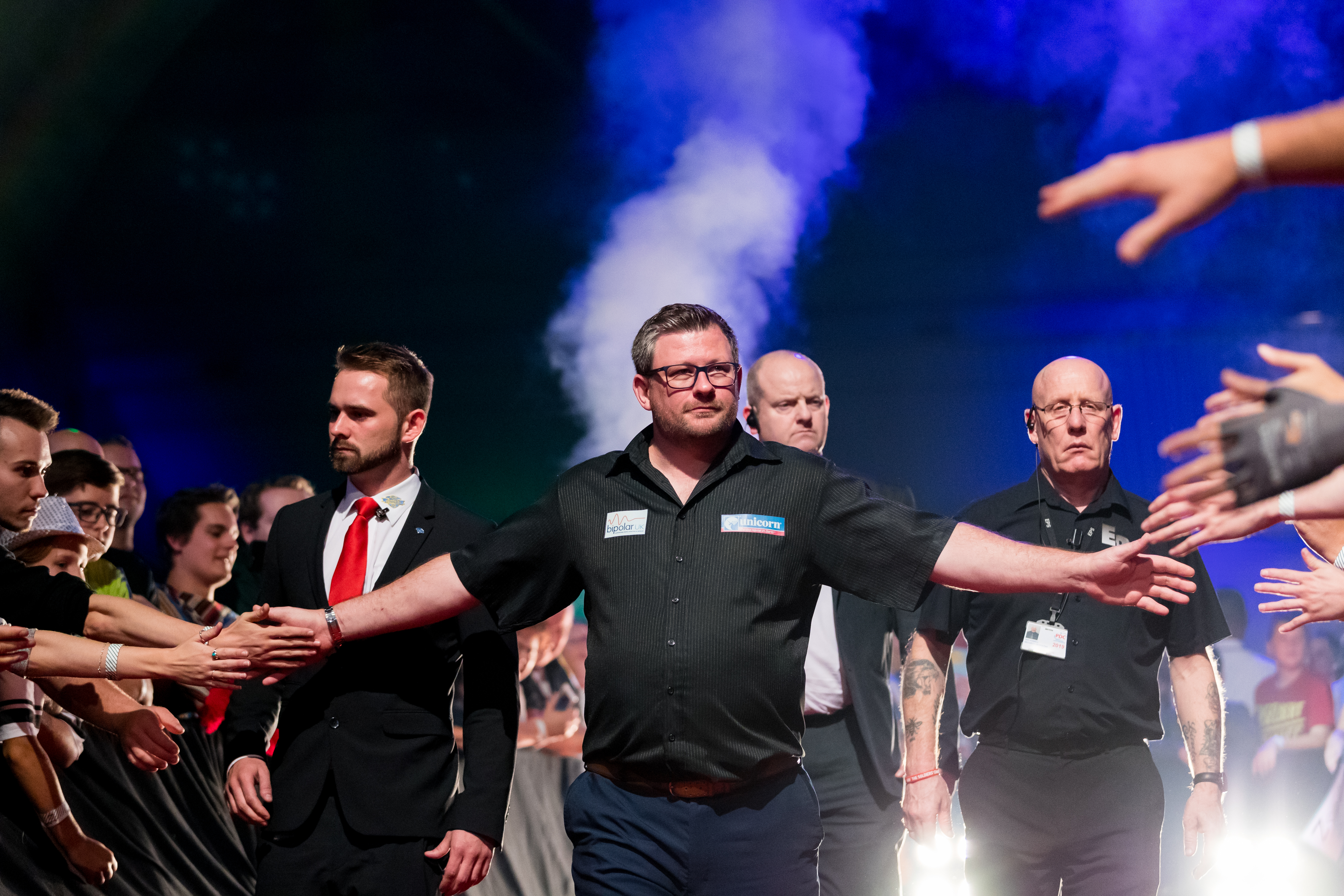
Wade at the 2019 European Darts Matchplay

Wade defeated Japanese Qualifier Seigo Asada 3–2 in the second round of the 2019 World Championship, a high quality, feisty affair in which Wade came under criticism for his celebrations aimed towards Asada. Wade later apologized for his actions. In the third round, Wade would go 0–2, and 1–3 down to Keegan Brown in a hostile atmosphere before producing a remarkable 4–3 comeback win. Wade became the 7th top 10 seed to crash out before the Quarter-Final stage, losing 4–3 to Ryan Joyce in the last 16. Wade was picked for the 2019 Premier League Darts on the 10-year anniversary of him winning the event. Wade's Masters campaign began with a 10–7 victory of Gerwyn Price. He followed the win with victories over Joe Cullen in the Quarter-Finals and Peter Wright in the Semi-Finals to set up a final with Michael van Gerwen. Wade lost the final 11–5 to Van Gerwen. Wade kicked off the 2019 Premier League Darts in style with a 7–4 win over outgoing Raymond van Barneveld with a 99 average. In week 4 of the 2019 Premier League Darts he beat Michael van Gerwen 7–3 Averaging 95.65. Wade continued his excellent form at the UK Open, dismantling fellow countryman James Wilson (darts player) 10–1 in the 4th round. Wade followed up the victory with a 10–7 win over Max Hopp but was surprisingly beaten 7–10 by Ross Smith in the round of 16. In week 5 of the 2019 Premier League Darts, Wade averaged 110 in his 7–0 whitewash win over Daryl Gurney sending him to the summit of the league table. Wade hit a 9-darter in a German Darts Championship match which he lost 5–6 to Darren Webster. Wade won Players Championship 9 in Barnsley defeating the likes of Mark Webster, Christian Kist, Peter Hudson, Arron Monk, Adrian Lewis, Scott Baker and Michael Smith in the final. The tournament victory was his first on the Players Championships since 2015 and the 12th Players Championship of his career. Wade followed the win up with another title in Barnsley the following week – Players Championship 11 – beating Michael Smith in a repeat final, 8–6. Wade made it a back-to-back double in Barnsley and 3 out of 4, winning Players Championship 12, defeating the likes of Luke Woodhouse, Christian Kist, Ted Evetts, Stephen Bunting, Jonny Clayton, Michael Smith and Jeffrey de Zwaan in the final. The title was Wade's 34th in the PDC. Wade made the Semi-finals of the Premier League for the first time since 2013, defeating Rob Cross 8–6 on the final night of the league stage season, finishing 3rd on the table. Wade would go on to lose 10–5 to Rob Cross the following week in the Semi-Finals at The O2. Wade won a 4th Players Championship title of the year at Wigan, PC 18, defeating the likes of Benito van de Pas, Yordi Meeuwisse, Keegan Brown, Rowby-John Rodriguez, Callan Rydz, Krzysztof Ratajski, and José de Sousa in the final. Wade's 4 PDC titles in one calendar year equalled a personal record set back in 2009.

Wade bettered his record of 4 PDC titles in one calendar year, by winning his 5th Players Championship event of the year at PC 24, defeating Dave Chisnall 8–6 in the final. Wade defeated John Henderson 2–1 in the first round of the 2019 World Grand Prix (darts). Wade went down to Mervyn King (darts player) 1–3 in the round of 16. Wade's attempt at defending his 2018 European Championship title ended abruptly in the 1st round of the 2019 event as he was whitewashed 0–6 by Welshman Jonny Clayton. Wade lost to Jonny Clayton 5–6 once more at the 2019 World Series of Darts Finals. Wade picked up his form again at the 2019 Grand Slam of Darts, winning his opening 2 group stage matches, 5–2 against Wesley Harms and 5–4 against Ian White. He was then defeated by Steve Lennon in the final group stage match and lost to Adrian Lewis 9–10 in last 16. Wade defeated Ted Evetts and Ricky Evans in the 1st and 2 cd rounds of the 2019 Players Championship Finals, respectively. Wade lost 10–6 to Michael van Gerwen in the 3rd round.

=== 2020 ===
Wade began the new decade with a whitewash win over Ritchie Edhouse in the 2020 World Championship, after which he was eliminated 4–2 by Steve Beaton in the third round. Wade performed well at the inaugural PDC Summer Series, defeating the likes of Jeffrey de Zwaan, Nathan Aspinall, Michael Smith, and Rob Cross, en route to winning Players Championship 12 of the year. James made the final of the European Championship, losing 11–4 to world champion Peter Wright. Wade defeated Damon Heta with a 102 average in his opening group stage match at the 2020 Grand Slam of Darts and beat both Jermaine Wattimena and Glen Durrant in his other group stage matches to top his group. In the last 16, Wade defeated fellow countryman Ian White 10–4, before again seeing off Damon Heta in the quarter-finals 16–13, with another 102 average. In the semi-finals, Wade failed to secure a lead over Dimitri van den Bergh for the entire match before producing a thrilling comeback from 5–9 and 12–14 down, to eventually seal a 16–15 victory. Wade lost to debutant Jose de Sousa in the final, 16–12.

=== 2021 ===
Wade opened his 2021 World Championship campaign with a comfortable 3–0 win against Callan Rydz in the second round. In the third round, he hit his 3rd televised 9 darter, and the first at the World Championship for five years. Despite the feat, he went on to lose the match 4–2 to Stephen Bunting. Wade made his first final at the UK Open since winning the event a decade earlier in 2011, defeating the likes of Ryan Joyce, Rob Cross, Gabriel Clemens, Simon Whitlock and world champion Gerwyn Price en route. Wade won his 3rd UK Open title of his career defeating Luke Humphries in the final. The title was Wade's 11th major of his career, becoming only the second player in PDC history to win major titles in 3 different decades after Phil Taylor. The title also ensured Wade's return to the top 4 on the Order of Merit for the first time in 9 years. Wade was originally left out of the 2021 Premier League Darts but ended up replacing Gerwyn Price who tested positive for coronavirus on opening night and subsequently pulled out of the tournament. Wade failed to win any of his 3 opening matches of the Premier League before beating Michael van Gerwen 7–3 on night 4. Wade's form improved in the second week of the tournament, hitting 3 consecutive 105 averages in defeating the likes of Peter Wright and Jonny Clayton. Wade ultimately finished 6th in the Premier League, defeating Gary Anderson on the final night of the league stage. Wade participated in the World Cup of Darts for the first time since 2010 because he was the top ranked darts player in England for the first time in his career, appearing alongside Dave Chisnall. England reached the semi-finals of the 2021 PDC World Cup of Darts where they were beaten by Austria. Wade started his 2021 World Grand Prix campaign with a 2–1 sets victory over Australian debutant Damon Heta. Wade fell at the second round hurdle, losing to Stephen Bunting 1–3.

At the 2021 Grand Slam of Darts, Wade hit a 113 average in a group stage match against countryman Rob Cross, winning 5–2 and securing his passage to the round of 16. It was the 9th consecutive year Wade advanced past the Group Stages & on to the knockout phase of the tournament. Wade defeated Rowby-John Rodriguez 10–2 in the last 16 and Rob Cross 16–14 in the Quarter-Finals. Wade lost to the eventual champion Gerwyn Price in the semi-finals 16–9. Wade reached the last 16 at the 2021 Players Championship Finals where he was beaten 10–7 by Daryl Gurney.

=== 2022 ===
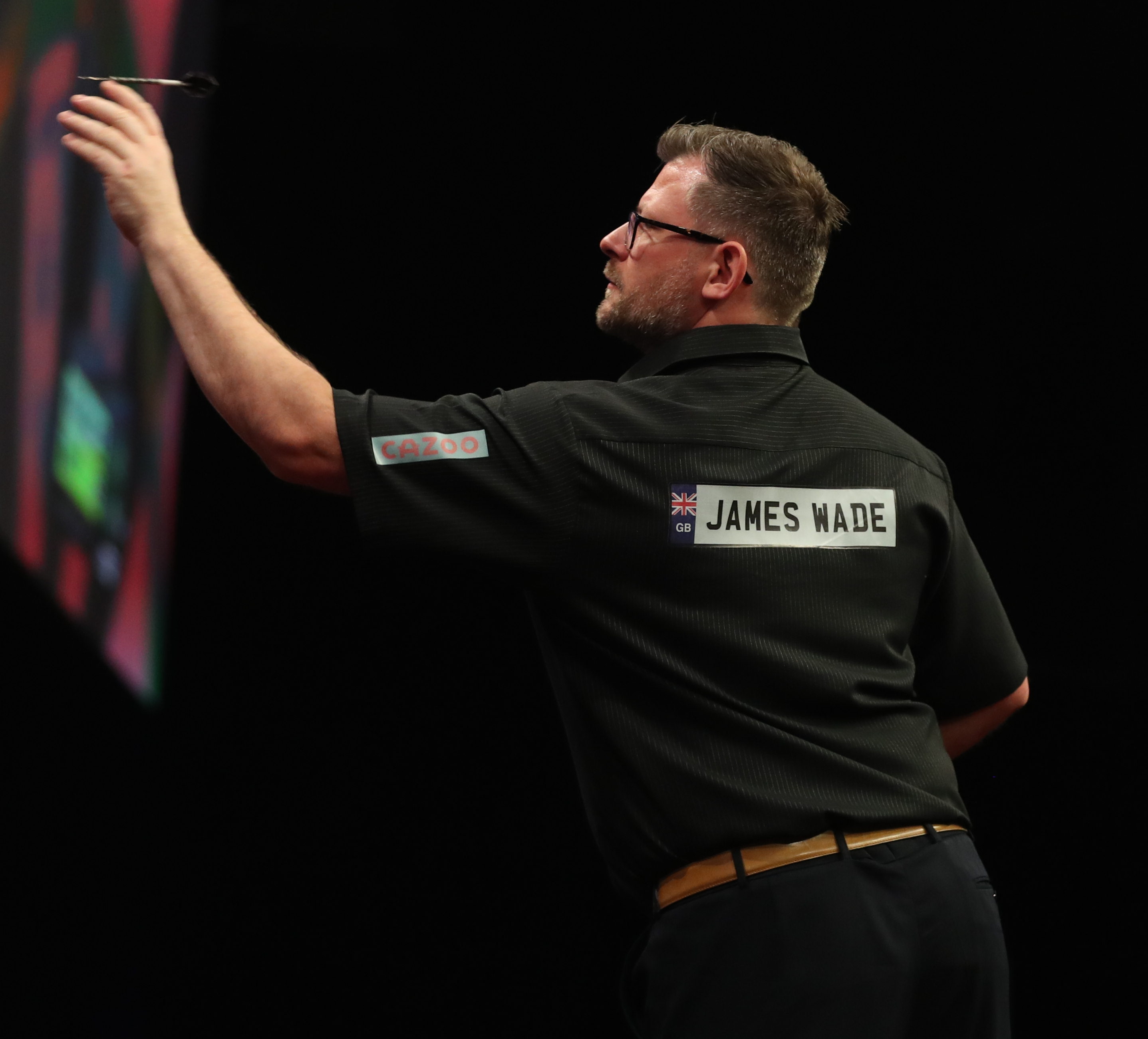
Wade during the 2022 Premier League Darts play-offs

Wade began his 2022 World Championship campaign with a 3–1 second round win against Maik Kuivenhoven. Wade would go on to reach the Semi-Finals for the first time since 2013, defeating the likes of Martijn Kleermaker and Mervyn King before losing to Michael Smith 6–3. Wade contested his 12th Premier League Darts season in 2022, the 3rd most appearances in the event behind only Phil Taylor & Raymond van Barneveld. Wade took down Gerwyn Price 6–3 on opening night in Cardiff before losing 4–6 to Jonny Clayton. Wade hit the fourth televised 9-darter of his career in a UK Open match against Boris Krcmar, where he went on to reach the Quarter-Finals losing out to Keane Barry 10–4. Wade reached 3 consecutive Premier League Darts finals, winning Night 12 with victories over Gary Anderson, Gerwyn Price & Joe Cullen. Wade reached the Semi-Finals of the 2022 European Darts Open, but he was forced to withdraw from the event due to an illness. It was later announced via his Twitter account that he was taken to a hospital in Leverkusen, where he was tested for symptoms which included a racing heart, high blood pressure, nausea and dizziness. Wade took part in the first ever PDC tournament held in New York at Madison Square Garden for the 2022 US Darts Masters, winning his opening round match 6–2 against Canadian Jeff Smith, before losing to Michael van Gerwen in the Quarter-Finals. Wade won the final Players Championship event of the year, defeating Steve Beaton 8–6 in the final.

=== 2023 ===
Wade suffered a surprising early elimination at the 2023 World Championship, losing 3–2 to Jim Williams in the second round. In March, Wade dropped out of the Top 10 in the world rankings for the first time since 2007. James would suffer early eliminations at the World Matchplay and World Grand Prix before rediscovering his form at the European Championship in late October where he defeated the likes of Dirk van Duijvenbode, Jose de Sousa, Luke Humphries and Gian van Veen en route to the final. Wade was defeated in the final by Peter Wright but subsequently jumped back into the World's Top 16 and qualified for the 2023 Grand Slam of Darts. James ended the year with a semi-final at the 2023 Grand Slam of Darts & a quarter-final at the 2023 Players Championship Finals.

=== 2024 ===
Wade was beaten 3–2 by world number 57 Matt Campbell in the second round of the 2024 World Championship, once again being eliminated in his opening match. Wade attributed his performance struggles in the first half of 2024 to a health scare and his battles with bipolar disorder, having won only 11 matches during the first five months of the year.

After securing the last qualification spot for the World Matchplay in the final event before the cut-off, Wade reached the quarter-finals of the event for the first time since 2019 after defeating defending champion Nathan Aspinall 11–8 in the second round. He beat Ross Smith 16–10 to advance to his first semi-final in nine years, before succumbing to reigning world champion and eventual tournament winner Luke Humphries in a 17–10 loss. He also reached the quarter-finals of the World Grand Prix, where he was eliminated by eventual champion Mike De Decker.

=== 2025 ===
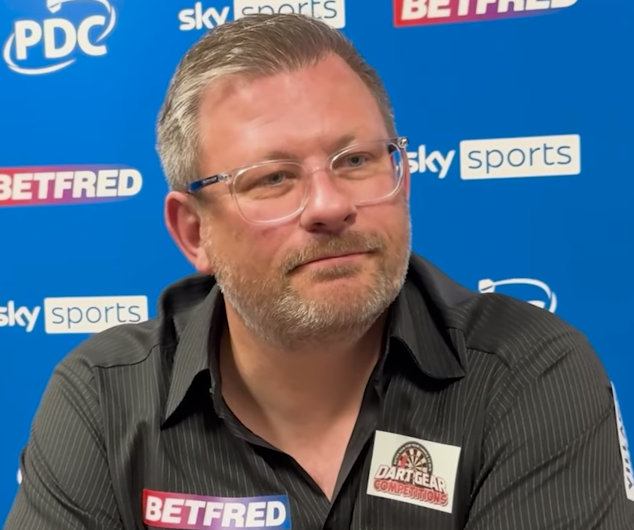
Wade at the 2025 World Matchplay

At the 2025 World Championship, Wade suffered his third consecutive second-round exit, losing 3–0 to Jermaine Wattimena. He returned to form at the UK Open by reaching the final of the tournament; he defeated world number one Luke Humphries in the quarter-finals and Josh Rock in the semi-finals, before succumbing to an 11–2 defeat to world champion Luke Littler. On 12 March, Wade posted a career-to-date personal best average of 115.92 against Beau Greaves at Players Championship 5. He won his first PDC title since November 2022 at Players Championship 19 by defeating Scott Williams 8–3 in the final.

At the World Matchplay, Wade reached his seventh final at the tournament. He once again faced Littler and despite leading 5–0, he went on to lose to Littler 18–13. His run to the final resulted in him re-entering the top five of the PDC Order of Merit.

=== 2026 ===
At the 2026 World Championship, Wade began his campaign with a 3–0 win over Ryusei Azemoto. He then suffered his fourth consecutive second-round exit in a 3–2 defeat to Ricky Evans, losing the deciding set in a tie-break after missing a dart to win the match. In February, Wade won the opening Players Championship event of the year by defeating Nathan Aspinall 8–6 in the final. At the UK Open, Wade reached his fifth final. He contested a rematch of the 2025 final against Luke Littler, losing 11–7.

Wade became the first player to win 1,000 matches in Players Championship events with a first-round victory at Players Championship 7. At the Australian Darts Masters, he won his first World Series title—excluding the 2018 World Series Finals—by defeating regional qualifier Brody Klinge 8–5 in the final.

== Stagenames ==
Whilst it is somewhat traditional for a darts player to adopt a sobriquet, Wade has adopted several in his career so far. His first nickname, The Gladiator, was used during his breakthrough year of 2006. His nickname was changed following his nine-dart exploits that year to 009 – a take on James Bond's 007. The 009 nickname was used from December 2006 to October 2007.

In November 2007, during the 2007 Grand Slam of Darts – Wade introduced himself on a television promo as having "no nickname". In December 2007, following a competition which invited fans to provide him with a new nickname, Wade briefly became known as Spectacular, a play on the fact that Wade is one of the few players who wears spectacles when he plays. He was briefly known as The Wingman. He cited his dislike for the insinuations the name lead to and fans asking him to make social appearances after matches. For his Premier League debut in January 2008, Wade unveiled another nickname – The Machine, which he has used ever since.

== Nine-dart finishes ==
He became the first player to hit three tournament nine-dart finishes in a calendar year during 2006. They came at the North-West UK Open Regional Final in March, the PDPA Players Championship at Hayling Island in June and he completed his hat-trick at the Vauxhall Men's Open in November. None of these achievements were in televised competitions.

Wade came within one dart of achieving the first ever nine-darter with a double start at the 2007 World Grand Prix in Dublin. In the semi-final against van Barneveld he hit double top to open the leg, then six treble 20s, treble 17 then missed a bullseye for a unique nine-darter.

On 20 November 2008, Wade completed his first live nine-darter hitting two 180s then T20, T19 and D12 against Gary Anderson in the second round of the 2008 Grand Slam of Darts which was shown on ITV4. However, Anderson went on to win the match 10–8, therefore Wade became the first man to hit a nine-dart finish in a major televised tournament in the UK and then go on to lose the match. (Michael van Gerwen had previously done so in a tournament on Dutch television.) Wade was also the first left-handed player to hit a live nine-darter.

In October 2014, at the World Grand Prix against Robert Thornton, Wade hit scores of 160, 180 and 161 to become the second ever player to throw a double-start nine darter. Later in the match Thornton repeated the feat with the pair becoming the first players to both throw nine darters in the same match in the history of darts. Wade remains the only PDC player to achieve a televised 9 darter for double start and open start formats.

In December 2020, Wade hit a nine-darter at the World Championships in a third-round game against Stephen Bunting. He became the first player in 5 years to throw a nine-darter at the PDC World Darts Championship, after Gary Anderson at the 2016 PDC World Darts Championship. He went on to lose the game 4–2.

Wade is also infamous for the number of nine darters thrown against him; he has had thirteen nine darters hit against him, a current PDPA record.

James Wade televised nine-dart finishes
Date	Opponent	Tournament	Method	Prize
20 November 2008	Gary Anderson	Grand Slam	3 x T20; 3 x T20; T20, T19, D12	
8 October 2014	Robert Thornton	World Grand Prix	D20, 2 x T20; 3 x T20; T20, T17, bullseye	£2,500
29 December 2020	Stephen Bunting	World Championship	3 x T20; 3 x T20; T20, T19, D12	
5 March 2022	Boris Krčmar	UK Open	3 x T20; 3 x T20; T20, T19, D12	

== Personal life ==
Wade quit his job at a garage in Aldershot twelve days before the start of the 2006 World Matchplay, becoming a full-time professional darts player.

Wade dated Soccer AM presenter Helen Chamberlain from 2008 to 2010, but they split after roughly two years together. On 8 August 2015, Wade married model Sammi Marsh, who he has been in a relationship with since 2013. Marsh worked for the PDC as a "walk-on" girl and often accompanied Wade during his entrance. She is now Wade's manager. The couple have two sons, born in 2018 and 2022.

In 2012, Wade, together with the seven other players who competed in the Premier League recorded a charity single with Chas Hodges and his band called 'Got My Tickets for the Darts' which was written by Chas. It was released on 18 May, the night after the play-offs at the O2 in London, where it was premiered. Proceeds from the single were donated to the Haven House Children's Hospice. On 8 October 2018, Wade's wife Sammi Marsh gave birth to a son. They also have a second son.

Wade has bipolar disorder and ADHD, and has openly spoken about his experiences with mental health. He has been an ambassador for Bipolar UK since 2016, wearing the charity's logo on his darts shirts, and has participated in fundraisers for them.

Wade chose his current walk-on song, "I'm Still Standing" by Elton John, to represent how he came through his struggles.

== World Championship performances ==
=== BDO World Championship ===
- 2003: First round (lost to Dennis Harbour 2–3)
- 2004: Second round (lost to Darryl Fitton 1–3)

=== PDC World Championship ===
- 2005: First round (lost to Mark Holden 0–3)
- 2006: First round (lost to Wayne Jones 2–3)
- 2007: Third round (lost to Terry Jenkins 3–4)
- 2008: Quarter-finals (lost to John Part 4–5)
- 2009: Semi-finals (lost to Raymond van Barneveld 4–6)
- 2010: Quarter-finals (lost to Simon Whitlock 3–5)
- 2011: Second round (lost to Mensur Suljović 2–4)
- 2012: Semi-finals (lost to Adrian Lewis 5–6)
- 2013: Semi-finals (lost to Michael van Gerwen 4–6)
- 2014: Quarter-finals (lost to Adrian Lewis 1–5)
- 2015: Second round (lost to Stephen Bunting 1–4)
- 2016: Quarter-finals (lost to Gary Anderson 1–5)
- 2017: Quarter-finals (lost to Peter Wright 3–5)
- 2018: First round (lost to Keegan Brown 2–3)
- 2019: Fourth round (lost to Ryan Joyce 3–4)
- 2020: Third round (lost to Steve Beaton 2–4)
- 2021: Third round (lost to Stephen Bunting 2–4)
- 2022: Semi-finals (lost to Michael Smith 3–6)
- 2023: Second round (lost to Jim Williams 2–3)
- 2024: Second round (lost to Matt Campbell 2–3)
- 2025: Second round (lost to Jermaine Wattimena 0–3)
- 2026: Second round (lost to Ricky Evans 2–3)

== Career finals ==
=== PDC major finals: 29 (11 titles) ===
Legend
World Matchplay (1–6)
World Grand Prix (2–1)
Grand Slam (0–3)
Premier League (1–2)
UK Open (3–2)
European Championship (1–2)
The Masters (1–1)
Championship League (1–0)
Las Vegas Desert Classic (0–1)
World Series of Darts Finals (1–0)

Outcome	No.	Year	Championship	Opponent in the final	Score
Runner-up	1.	2006	World Matchplay	Phil Taylor	11–18 (l)
Winner	1.	2007	World Matchplay	Terry Jenkins	18–7 (l)
Winner	2.	2007	World Grand Prix	Terry Jenkins	6–3 (s)
Runner-up	2.	2008	Premier League	Phil Taylor	8–16 (l)
Winner	3.	2008	UK Open	Gary Mawson	11–7 (l)
Runner-up	3.	2008	Las Vegas Desert Classic	Phil Taylor	7–13 (l)
Runner-up	4.	2008	World Matchplay (2)	Phil Taylor	9–18 (l)
Winner	4.	2009	Premier League	Mervyn King	13–8 (l)
Runner-up	5.	2010	Premier League (2)	Phil Taylor	8–10 (l)
Winner	5.	2010	World Grand Prix (2)	Adrian Lewis	6–3 (s)
Winner	6.	2010	Championship League	Phil Taylor	6–5 (l)
Runner-up	6.	2010	Grand Slam	Scott Waites	12–16 (l)
Winner	7.	2011	UK Open (2)	Wes Newton	11–8 (l)
Runner-up	7.	2011	World Matchplay (3)	Phil Taylor	8–18 (l)
Runner-up	8.	2012	World Matchplay (4)	Phil Taylor	15–18 (l)
Runner-up	9.	2014	World Grand Prix	Michael van Gerwen	3–5 (s)
Winner	8.	2014	The Masters	Mervyn King	11–10 (l)
Runner-up	10.	2015	World Matchplay (5)	Michael van Gerwen	12–18 (l)
Runner-up	11.	2016	Grand Slam (2)	Michael van Gerwen	8–16 (l)
Winner	9.	2018	European Championship	Simon Whitlock	11–8 (l)
Winner	10.	2018	World Series of Darts Finals	Michael Smith	11–10 (l)
Runner-up	12.	2019	The Masters	Michael van Gerwen	5–11 (l)
Runner-up	13.	2020	European Championship	Peter Wright	4–11 (l)
Runner-up	14.	2020	Grand Slam (3)	José de Sousa	12–16 (l)
Winner	11.	2021	UK Open (3)	Luke Humphries	11–5 (l)
Runner-up	15.	2023	European Championship (2)	Peter Wright	6–11 (l)
Runner-up	16.	2025	UK Open	Luke Littler	2–11 (l)
Runner-up	17.	2025	World Matchplay (6)	Luke Littler	13–18 (l)
Runner-up	18.	2026	UK Open (2)	Luke Littler	7–11 (l)

=== PDC World Series finals: 4 (1 title) ===
Outcome	No.	Year	Championship	Opponent in the final	Score
Runner-up	1.	2015	Perth Masters	Phil Taylor	7–11 (l)
Runner-up	2.	2016	Shanghai Masters	Michael van Gerwen	3–8 (l)
Runner-up	3.	2022	New South Wales Masters	Jonny Clayton	1–8 (l)
Winner	1.	2026	Australian Masters	Brody Klinge	8–5 (l)

== Performance timeline ==
=== BDO ===
Tournament	2002	2003	2004	2007
BDO World Championship	DNQ	1R	2R	PDC
International Darts League	NH	RR	QF	QF
World Darts Trophy	DNQ	2R	DNP	1R
World Masters	2R	2R	PDC	
Zuiderduin Masters	RR	RR	DNP	

=== PDC ===
Tournament	2003	2004	2005	2006	2007	2008	2009	2010	2011		2012	2013	2014	2015	2016	2017	2018	2019	2020	2021	2022	2023	2024	2025	2026
PDC Ranked televised events
World Championship	BDO		1R	1R	3R	QF	SF	QF	2R		SF	SF	QF	2R	QF	QF	1R	4R	3R	3R	SF	2R	2R	2R	2R
World Masters (Note: A non-ranked event until 2025.)	Not held											SF	W	QF	SF	1R	QF	F	1R	QF	2R	2R	1R	2R	QF
UK Open	4R	4R	6R	3R	5R	W	3R	QF	W		3R	QF	5R	5R	3R	3R	4R	6R	6R	W	QF	4R	4R	F	F
World Matchplay	DNP	DNQ		F	W	F	QF	SF	F		F	SF	QF	F	1R	1R	2R	QF	2R	1R	2R	1R	SF	F	QF
World Grand Prix	DNP	DNQ	1R	QF	W	1R	1R	W	SF		1R	SF	F	1R	1R	1R	1R	2R	1R	2R	1R	1R	QF	1R	SF
European Championship	Not held					2R	SF	1R	QF		1R	2R	1R	2R	SF	DNQ	W	1R	F	2R	2R	F	2R	QF	1R
Grand Slam (Note: A non-ranked event until 2015.)	Not held				2R	2R	2R	F	2R		RR	QF	2R	2R	F	2R	2R	2R	F	SF	DNQ	SF	2R	RR	2R
Players Championship Finals	Not held						SF	1R	2R	QF	1R	1R	1R	2R	2R	QF	3R	3R	1R	3R	2R	QF	1R	QF	
PDC Non-ranked televised events
Premier League	Not held		DNP			F	W	F	5th		SF	SF	DNP	7th	6th	7th	DNP	SF	DNP	6th	SF	DNP			
World Cup	Not held							2R	NH		Did not qualify									SF	SF	DNQ			
World Series Finals	Not held													QF	2R	SF	W	2R	SF	1R	SF	DNP		1R	QF
Past major events
Las Vegas Desert Classic	DNP	1R	2R	DNQ	1R	F	SF	Not held																	
Championship League	Not held					RR	SF	W	RR		RR	RR	Not held												
Champions League	Not held														SF	DNQ		RR	Not held						
Career statistics
Year-end ranking	-	44	27	11	3	3	3	2	3		3	6	6	6	6	11	9	8	7	4	8	19	16	11	

==== European Tour ====
Season	1	2	3	4	5	6	7	8	9	10	11	12	13	14	15
2012	ADO; F	GDC; 1R	EDO; QF	GDM; SF	DDM; DNP										
2013	UKM; QF	EDT; WD	EDO; 3R	ADO; 3R	GDT; 3R	GDC; EX	GDM; QF	DDM; 3R							
2014	Did not qualify				GDT; W	EDO; QF	EDG; 3R	EDT; 1R							
2015	GDC; 3R	GDT; SF	GDM; QF	DDM; 2R	IDO; DNP	EDO; SF	EDT; QF	EDM; DNP	EDG; SF						
2016	DDM; 3R	GDM; 2R	GDT; 3R	EDM; W	ADO; DNP	EDO; 3R	IDO; WD	EDT; SF	EDG; QF	GDC; DNP					
2017	GDC; 2R	GDM; SF	GDO; DNP	EDG; 2R	GDT; 2R	EDM; 2R	ADO; DNP	EDO; 2R	Did not qualify			EDT; 1R			
2018	EDO; SF	GDG; SF	GDO; 2R	ADO; 3R	EDG; F	DDM; 1R	GDT; 3R	DDO; 3R	EDM; DNP	GDC; 2R	DDC; 2R	IDO; DNP	EDT; F		
2019	EDO; QF	GDC; 3R	GDG; 2R	GDO; 3R	ADO; SF	EDG; WD	DDM; WD	DDO; 3R	CDO; 2R	ADC; DNP	EDM; SF	IDO; DNP	GDT; QF		
2020	BDC; 3R	GDC; QF	EDG; 3R	IDO; QF											
2021	HDT; 3R	GDT; QF													
2022	IDO; QF	DNQ		ADO; 3R	EDO; SF	Did not qualify									
2023	BSD; 2R	EDO; 2R	Did not qualify				BDO; 1R	DNQ		EDM; SF	GDO; 1R	HDT; 2R	GDC; 3R		
2024	BDO; 2R	GDG; 1R	IDO; 2R	EDG; 1R	ADO; 1R	BSD; 2R	DDC; 2R	EDO; 1R	GDC; 2R	FDT; 2R	HDT; 2R	SDT; QF	CDO; 2R		
2025	BDO; SF	EDT; 2R	IDO; 2R	GDG; 2R	ADO; WD	EDG; QF	DDC; 2R	EDO; 3R	BSD; SF	FDT; SF	CDO; SF	HDT; QF	SDT; 2R	GDC; 2R	
2026	PDO; 2R	EDT; WD	BDO; 2R	GDG; 2R	EDG; 3R	ADO; 3R	IDO; QF	BSD; 3R	SDO; WD	EDO; QF	HDT; WD	CDO; WD	FDT; W	SDT; 2R	DDC; DNP

==== Players Championships ====
Season	1	2	3	4	5	6	7	8	9	10	11	12	13	14	15	16	17	18	19	20	21	22	23	24	25	26	27	28	29	30	31	32	33	34
2011	HAL; DNP		DER; 3R	DER; 4R	CRA; 2R	CRA; 3R	VIE; DNP		CRA; 2R	CRA; 3R	BAR; 3R	BAR; SF	NUL; 3R	NUL; 4R	Did not participate						DUB; 1R	DUB; 2R	KIL; DNP	GLA; W	GLA; 3R	ALI; W	ALI; 4R	CRA; 2R	CRA; 3R	WIG; 2R	WIG; 3R			
2012	ALI; 4R	ALI; SF	REA; 1R	REA; QF	CRA; 3R	CRA; 2R	BIR; DNP		CRA; SF	CRA; 3R	BAR; 4R	BAR; 3R	Did not participate																					
2013	WIG; 4R	WIG; 3R	WIG; DNP		CRA; 3R	CRA; QF	BAR; DNP		DUB; QF	Did not participate																								
2014	BAR; SF	BAR; 3R	CRA; QF	CRA; 1R	WIG; QF	WIG; QF	WIG; 4R	WIG; 3R	CRA; 3R	CRA; 1R	COV; 2R	COV; F	CRA; 3R	CRA; 3R	DUB; 1R	DUB; 4R	CRA; W	CRA; F	COV; 2R	COV; SF														
2015	BAR; F	BAR; W	BAR; DNP			COV; F	COV; F	COV; QF	CRA; SF	Did not participate			WIG; W	WIG; 4R	BAR; 3R	BAR; 4R	DUB; 4R	DUB; 1R	COV; 1R	COV; F														
2016	BAR; 3R	BAR; 2R	BAR; 1R	BAR; 2R	BAR; DNP	BAR; F	BAR; 3R	COV; 2R	COV; 1R	BAR; DNP		BAR; 1R	BAR; 4R	BAR; DNP	BAR; 2R	BAR; 2R	DUB; QF	DUB; 2R	BAR; 4R	BAR; 1R														
2017	BAR; SF	BAR; QF	BAR; 3R	BAR; 4R	MIL; DNP	MIL; 1R	BAR; 4R	BAR; SF	WIG; 2R	WIG; 1R	MIL; 1R	MIL; 3R	WIG; 1R	WIG; 3R	BAR; DNP		BAR; 2R	BAR; 4R	DUB; 4R	DUB; 2R	BAR; 4R	BAR; 1R												
2018	BAR; F	BAR; 1R	BAR; 1R	BAR; 1R	MIL; 1R	MIL; 4R	BAR; 3R	BAR; 2R	WIG; SF	WIG; 4R	MIL; 1R	MIL; 4R	WIG; 2R	WIG; 1R	BAR; F	BAR; 3R	BAR; SF	BAR; 2R	DUB; 1R	DUB; 2R	BAR; 1R	BAR; QF												
2019	WIG; 3R	WIG; QF	WIG; 1R	WIG; 3R	BAR; QF	BAR; DNP	WIG; 2R	WIG; 3R	BAR; W	BAR; 1R	BAR; W	BAR; W	BAR; DNP		BAR; 2R	BAR; DNP	WIG; 1R	WIG; W	DNP				BAR; 3R	BAR; W	BAR; DNP		DUB; 2R	DUB; QF	BAR; DNP					
2020	BAR; 1R	BAR; 4R	WIG; 2R	WIG; 4R	WIG; 2R	WIG; QF	BAR; SF	BAR; F	MIL; 3R	MIL; 4R	MIL; 4R	MIL; W	MIL; QF	NIE; 2R	NIE; 3R	NIE; 3R	NIE; 4R	NIE; QF	COV; 3R	COV; 3R	COV; 2R	COV; DNP	COV; 2R											
2021	BOL; QF	BOL; 2R	BOL; 4R	BOL; 4R	MIL; 1R	MIL; QF	MIL; F	MIL; 3R	DNP				MIL; QF	MIL; 3R	MIL; 1R	MIL; DNP	COV; 2R	COV; 3R	COV; 3R	COV; SF	BAR; 2R	BAR; 3R	BAR; SF	BAR; 3R	BAR; 1R	BAR; 2R	BAR; 1R	BAR; 1R	BAR; 1R	BAR; QF				
2022	BAR; 3R	BAR; 1R	WIG; QF	WIG; 3R	BAR; 2R	BAR; 2R	NIE; 1R	NIE; QF	BAR; 3R	BAR; 1R	BAR; 4R	BAR; 3R	BAR; 1R	DNP			NIE; 3R	BAR; 4R	BAR; 3R	BAR; 1R	BAR; 3R	BAR; 1R	BAR; DNP		BAR; 2R	BAR; 3R	BAR; 3R	BAR; 2R	BAR; 3R	BAR; W				
2023	BAR; 3R	BAR; QF	BAR; 1R	BAR; 3R	BAR; 2R	BAR; 3R	HIL; 1R	HIL; 4R	WIG; QF	WIG; 2R	LEI; 4R	LEI; 3R	HIL; 4R	HIL; 3R	LEI; 1R	LEI; QF	HIL; 3R	HIL; 4R	BAR; SF	BAR; 1R	BAR; 2R	BAR; QF	BAR; 3R	BAR; 3R	BAR; 2R	BAR; 3R	BAR; 3R	BAR; 1R	BAR; 4R	BAR; 1R				
2024	WIG; 2R	WIG; 2R	LEI; 1R	LEI; 2R	HIL; 2R	HIL; 4R	LEI; 1R	LEI; 1R	HIL; 1R	HIL; 2R	HIL; QF	HIL; 1R	MIL; QF	MIL; 3R	MIL; 2R	MIL; 3R	MIL; 1R	MIL; 4R	MIL; 4R	WIG; 3R	WIG; 4R	LEI; SF	LEI; 2R	WIG; DNP			WIG; 3R	WIG; 2R	LEI; QF	LEI; 4R				
2025	WIG; 3R	WIG; 2R	ROS; 4R	ROS; QF	LEI; 4R	LEI; QF	HIL; DNP		LEI; 4R	LEI; 3R	LEI; 3R	LEI; 1R	ROS; 1R	ROS; QF	HIL; 2R	HIL; 1R	LEI; QF	LEI; 4R	LEI; W	LEI; 1R	LEI; 4R	HIL; DNP		MIL; 3R	MIL; 1R	DNP			LEI; 3R	LEI; 1R	WIG; QF	WIG; 1R	WIG; DNP	
2026	HIL; W	HIL; 3R	WIG; SF	WIG; 1R	LEI; DNP		LEI; 2R	LEI; 3R	WIG; 2R	WIG; 3R	MIL; 3R	MIL; 4R	HIL; 2R	HIL; 3R	LEI; 1R	LEI; 2R	LEI; 1R	LEI; SF	Did not participate				LEI; 3R	LEI; 1R	Did not participate						ROS; 3R	ROS; 1R	LEI; 1R	LEI; 4R

Key

Performance Table Legend
W	Won the tournament	F	Finalist	SF	Semifinalist	QF	Quarterfinalist	#R; RR; Prel.	Lost in # round Round-robin; Preliminary round	EX	Excluded
DNQ	Did not qualify	DNP	Did not participate	WD	Withdrew	NH	Tournament not held	#R; RR; Prel.	Lost in # round Round-robin; Preliminary round	NYF	Not yet founded

== Notes ==
Awards
Preceded by Phil Taylor	PDC Player of the Year; 2007	Succeeded by Phil Taylor
