= List of indoor arenas in Belgium =

The following is a list of indoor arenas in Belgium, ordered by seating-only capacity. Indoor stadiums with a capacity of at least 2,000 are included in the list. The venues are by their final capacity after construction for seating-only and standing-only events.

== Current arenas ==
Image	Stadium	Capacity seated	Capacity standing	City	Team(s)	Inaugurated
	AFAS Dome	15,089	23,001	Antwerp	None	1933
	Trixxo Arena	9,946	18,000	Hasselt	None	2004
	Flanders Expo	9,000	20,000	Ghent	None	1987
	Forest National	8,400	NA	Brussels	None	1970
	Dôme	6,330	NA	Charleroi	Spirou Charleroi	1992
	Lotto Arena	5,218	8,050	Antwerp	Antwerp Giants	2007
	ING Arena	±5,000	15,000	Brussels	None	2013
	Flanders Sports Arena	5,000	NA	Ghent	None	2000
	Country Hall Liège	4,783	7,123	Liège	Liège Basket	1972
	COREtec Dôme	4,779	NA	Ostend	B.C. Oostende	2006
	Hall du Paire	4,000	NA	Pepinster	RBC Pepinster	2006
	Expodroom	3,900	NA	Bree	None	2001
	Mons.Arena	3,700	NA	Mons	Belfius Mons-Hainaut	
	Sporthal Arena	2,100	NA	Deurne	None	1966
	Triangel St. Vith	750	2,000	St. Vith	None	2009

== See also ==
- List of indoor arenas in Europe
- List of indoor arenas by capacity
- Lists of stadiums
