= Sporthal Arena =

Indoor arena in Deurne, Antwerp, Belgium

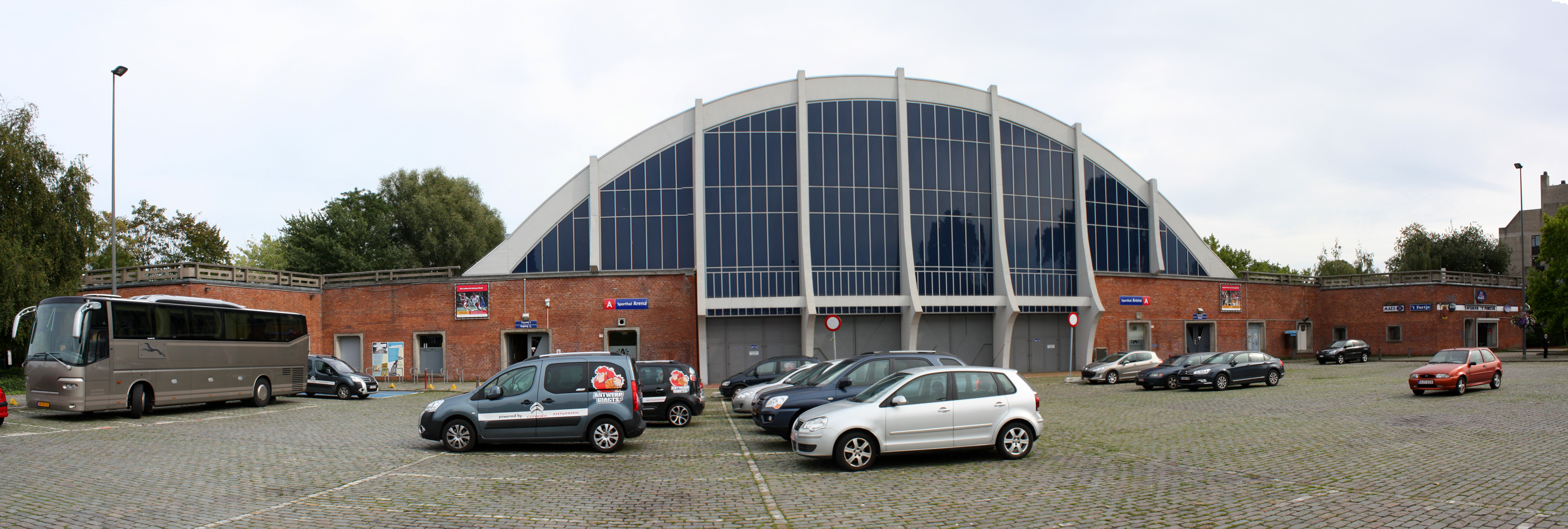
- Interactive map of Sporthal Arena
- Location: Antwerp, Belgium
- Coordinates: 51°12′23.83″N 4°27′34.05″E
- Capacity: 2,100

Construction
- Opened: 1966
- Renovated: 2008–2009

Sporthal Arena is an indoor arena in Deurne, Antwerp, Belgium. Built in 1966, it has a capacity for 2,100 people, 1,196 of which are seating capacity. An 800,000 Euro renovation works took place between April 2008-February 2009. The basketball club Antwerp Diamond Giants used the arena before moving to Lotto Arena, and the club junior squad and practice sessions of the senior squad still take place at the arena.

The arena hosted the 1971 FIBA European Champions cup final in which CSKA Moscow defeated Ignis Varese 67-53 and the 1975 final of the same competition in which Ignis Varese defeated Real Madrid 79–66.

== See also ==
- List of indoor arenas in Belgium

Preceded by Dvorana Skenderija; Sarajevo	FIBA European Champions Cup; Final Venue; 1971	Succeeded by The Sport Palace at Yad Eliyahu; Tel Aviv
Preceded by Palais des Sports de Beaulieu; Nantes	FIBA European Champions Cup; Final Venue; 1975	Succeeded by Patinoire des Vernets; Geneva
