= 2017 World Grand Prix (darts) =

2017 Unibet World Grand Prix

Tournament information
- Dates: 1–7 October 2017
- Venue: Citywest Hotel
- Location: Dublin, Ireland
- Organisation(s): Professional Darts Corporation (PDC)
- Format: Sets "Double in, Double out"
- Prize fund: £400,000
- Winner's share: £100,000
- High checkout: 170 Justin Pipe

Champion(s)
- Daryl Gurney (NIR)

The 2017 Unibet World Grand Prix was the 20th staging of the World Grand Prix. It was held from 1 to 7 October 2017 at the Citywest Hotel in Dublin, Ireland.

Michael van Gerwen was the defending champion after defeating Gary Anderson 5–2 in the 2016 final, but lost to John Henderson 2–1 in the first round. This was the first time since December 2011 that van Gerwen lost in the first round of a major ranking tournament.

Daryl Gurney won his first major televised title after beating Simon Whitlock 5–4 in the final.

For the first time in PDC history, no English player made the quarter-final stages of a televised tournament. Gurney's success also marked the first time that a televised darts tournament was won by a Northern Irish player.

== Prize money ==
The total prize money remained at £400,000. The following is the breakdown of the fund:

Position (num. of players)		Prize money (Total: £400,000)
Winner	(1)	£100,000
Runner-up	(1)	£45,000
Semi-finalists	(2)	£23,500
Quarter-finalists	(4)	£15,000
Second round losers	(8)	£8,500
First round losers	(16)	£5,000

== Qualification ==
The field of 32 players was made up from the top 16 on the PDC Order of Merit on September 11 and the top 16 non-qualified players from the ProTour Order of Merit. In a change to qualification from recent years, the top two non-qualified residents of the Republic of Ireland and Northern Ireland now no longer get an automatic qualification spot. The top eight players were seeded in the tournament.

Phil Taylor (who would have been the #4 seed) opted not to enter the tournament, moving the rest of the top 16 up a place, thus meaning 17th placed Robert Thornton (the 2015 champion who would not have qualified otherwise) took his place. Number two seed Gary Anderson withdrew shortly before the tournament began due to the impending birth of his child, with Mark Webster, the highest-ranked player from the PDC Order of Merit not to have qualified, replacing him in the draw, with the seedings not being adjusted. Four players, Rob Cross, Ronny Huybrechts, Christian Kist and Richard North made their World Grand Prix debuts.

The following players qualified for the tournament:

PDC Order of Merit (1–16) (Top 8 seeded)

1. (Netherlands) Michael van Gerwen (first round)
2. (Scotland) ~~Gary Anderson (Withdrew)~~
3. (Scotland) Peter Wright (quarter-finals)
4. (England) Adrian Lewis (first round)
5. (England) Dave Chisnall (second round)
6. (Austria) Mensur Suljović (semi-finals)
7. (England) Michael Smith (first round)
8. (Netherlands) Raymond van Barneveld (quarter-finals)
9. (Netherlands) Jelle Klaasen (first round)
10. (England) James Wade (first round)
11. (Northern Ireland) Daryl Gurney (winner)
12. (Belgium) Kim Huybrechts (first round)
13. (England) Ian White (first round)
14. (Netherlands) Benito van de Pas (quarter-finals)
15. (Australia) Simon Whitlock (runner-up)
16. (Scotland) Robert Thornton (quarter-finals)
24. (Wales) Mark Webster (first round)

Pro Tour

1. (England) Rob Cross (first round)
2. (England) Alan Norris (second round)
3. (England) Joe Cullen (second round)
4. (England) Mervyn King (second round)
5. (Wales) Gerwyn Price (second round)
6. (England) Steve Beaton (second round)
7. (Australia) Kyle Anderson (first round)
8. (Spain) Cristo Reyes (first round)
9. (England) Darren Webster (first round)
10. (England) Stephen Bunting (first round)
11. (Netherlands) Christian Kist (first round)
12. (Scotland) John Henderson (semi-finals)
13. (England) Justin Pipe (first round)
14. (England) Steve West (second round)
15. (England) Richard North (second round)
16. (Belgium) Ronny Huybrechts (first round)

== Draw ==
First round (best of 3 sets); 1–2 October
1	(Netherlands) Michael van Gerwen 87.64	1
(Scotland) John Henderson 76.08	2
(England) Alan Norris 81.72	2
(England) Justin Pipe 81.53	1
8	(Netherlands) Raymond van Barneveld 90.21	2
(Australia) Kyle Anderson 86.60	0
(England) Rob Cross 85.59	0
(England) Steve Beaton 89.59	2
4	(England) Adrian Lewis 87.49	1
(Northern Ireland) Daryl Gurney 90.09	2
(England) Joe Cullen 91.62	2
(England) Darren Webster 87.16	1
5	(England) Dave Chisnall 101.10	2
(Netherlands) Jelle Klaasen 84.05	0
(Belgium) Kim Huybrechts 85.82	1
(Scotland) Robert Thornton 78.93	2
Alt	(Wales) Mark Webster 78.41	0
(England) Richard North 75.21	2
(Australia) Simon Whitlock 89.31	2
(Netherlands) Christian Kist 81.65	1
7	(England) Michael Smith 80.70	1
(Wales) Gerwyn Price 86.36	2
(Netherlands) Benito van de Pas 83.59	2
(Spain) Cristo Reyes 84.47	1
3	(Scotland) Peter Wright 95.90	2
(England) Stephen Bunting 83.58	1
(England) Mervyn King 85.36	2
(Belgium) Ronny Huybrechts 81.83	0
6	(Austria) Mensur Suljović 85.89	2
(England) Ian White 85.34	1
(England) James Wade 85.67	0
(England) Steve West 85.08	2

Second round (best of 5 sets); 3–4 October
(Scotland) John Henderson 87.10	3
(England) Alan Norris 82.78	1
8	(Netherlands) Raymond van Barneveld 84.95	3
(England) Steve Beaton 78.79	0
(Northern Ireland) Daryl Gurney 89.13	3
(England) Joe Cullen 85.39	1
5	(England) Dave Chisnall 90.98	2
(Scotland) Robert Thornton 91.02	3
(England) Richard North 83.77	0
(Australia) Simon Whitlock 86.10	3
(Wales) Gerwyn Price 91.14	0
(Netherlands) Benito van de Pas 95.13	3
3	(Scotland) Peter Wright 94.00	3
(England) Mervyn King 85.66	1
6	(Austria) Mensur Suljović 87.83	3
(England) Steve West 84.66	0

Quarter-finals (best of 5 sets); 5 October
(Scotland) John Henderson 81.83	3
8	(Netherlands) Raymond van Barneveld 83.33	1
(Northern Ireland) Daryl Gurney 86.47	3
(Scotland) Robert Thornton 82.10	2
(Australia) Simon Whitlock 86.98	3
(Netherlands) Benito van de Pas 76.88	0
3	(Scotland) Peter Wright 91.74	1
6	(Austria) Mensur Suljović 90.89	3

Semi-finals (best of 7 sets); 6 October
(Scotland) John Henderson 83.88	1
(Northern Ireland) Daryl Gurney 83.42	4
(Australia) Simon Whitlock 86.03	4
6	(Austria) Mensur Suljović 92.92	3

Final (best of 9 sets); 7 October
(Northern Ireland) Daryl Gurney 88.50	5
(Australia) Simon Whitlock 83.53	4
