= Richard North (darts player) =

English darts player

Personal information
- Nickname: "The Lionheart"
- Born: 23 April 1990 (age 36) Hertford, England
- Home town: Romsey, England

Sport
- Sport: Darts
- Playing since: 2010
- Darts: 25g Red Dragon Signature
- Laterality: Right-handed
- Walk-on music: "Shotgun" by George Ezra

Organisation (see split in darts)
- PDC: 2011–
- WDF: 2022–

PDC premier events – best performances
- World Championship: Last 64: 2018, 2019
- World Matchplay: Last 32: 2018
- World Grand Prix: Last 16: 2017
- UK Open: Last 32: 2019
- European Championship: Last 16: 2018
- PC Finals: Last 32: 2017

Other tournament wins
- Years
Malta Open	2022

Richard North (born 23 April 1990) is an English professional darts player who competes in World Darts Federation (WDF) and Professional Darts Corporation (PDC) events. From 2017 to 2020, he was a holder of the PDC Tour Card. He is a Malta Open Champion.

== Career ==
A former bricklayer, North won a PDC Tour Card at Q-School in January 2017.

He had previously reached the last 64 of the 2011 UK Open, before losing 9–2 to Dave Chisnall.

His breakthrough year came after getting his Tour Card in 2017, where he reached the final of Players Championship 18, before losing in a last leg decider against Chisnall. He qualified for the 2017 World Grand Prix in Dublin, by his position in the pro tour ranking. He won his first round match against Mark Webster 2–0 in sets, holding his opponent to just one leg, to set up a second-round tilt with Simon Whitlock.

His form in 2017 saw him qualify for the 2018 PDC World Darts Championship via the Pro Tour Order of Merit, but he was drawn against 5-time world champion Raymond van Barneveld, and the Dutchman dispatched North 3–0.

== World Championship results ==
=== PDC ===
- 2018: First round (lost to Raymond van Barneveld 0–3)
- 2019: Second round (lost to Steve West 1–3)

== Performance timeline ==
Tournament	2011	2012	2013	2014	2015	2016	2017	2018	2019	2020
PDC World Championship	Did not qualify							1R	2R	DNQ
UK Open	3R	Did not qualify					2R	2R	5R	4R
World Matchplay	Did not qualify							1R	DNQ	
World Grand Prix	Did not qualify						2R	Did not qualify		
European Championship	Did not qualify							2R	DNQ	
Players Championship Finals	Did not qualify						2R	1R	DNQ	

PDC Players Championships

Season	1	2	3	4	5	6	7	8	9	10	11	12	13	14	15	16	17	18	19	20	21	22	23	24	25	26	27	28	29	30	31	32	33	34
2017	BAR; 2R	BAR; 2R	BAR; 2R	BAR; 1R	MIL; QF	MIL; QF	BAR; 1R	BAR; 3R	WIG; 2R	WIG; 2R	MIL; 3R	MIL; 4R	WIG; 4R	WIG; QF	BAR; 3R	BAR; 2R	BAR; 2R	BAR; F	DUB; 4R	DUB; 2R	BAR; 1R	BAR; QF												
2018	BAR; 1R	BAR; 1R	BAR; QF	BAR; 2R	MIL; 1R	MIL; 4R	BAR; 1R	BAR; 1R	WIG; 3R	WIG; DNP	MIL; 1R	MIL; 1R	WIG; 2R	WIG; 2R	BAR; 3R	BAR; 3R	BAR; 3R	BAR; 4R	DUB; 1R	DUB; 2R	BAR; 2R	BAR; 1R												
2019	WIG; 1R	WIG; 1R	WIG; 1R	WIG; 1R	BAR; 1R	BAR; 2R	WIG; 1R	WIG; 1R	BAR; 2R	BAR; 3R	BAR; DNP		BAR; 1R	BAR; 1R	BAR; 1R	BAR; 1R	WIG; 1R	WIG; 1R	BAR; 1R	BAR; 1R	HIL; 2R	HIL; 1R	BAR; 2R	BAR; 2R	BAR; 2R	BAR; 1R	DUB; 1R	DUB; 1R	BAR; 2R	BAR; 1R				
2020	BAR; 2R	BAR; 1R	WIG; 1R	WIG; 1R	WIG; 1R	WIG; 2R	BAR; 2R	BAR; 1R	MIL; 3R	MIL; 2R	MIL; 1R	MIL; 1R	MIL; 2R	NIE; 2R	NIE; 1R	NIE; 1R	NIE; 2R	NIE; 1R	COV; 1R	COV; 2R	COV; 1R	COV; 1R	COV; 1R											
