= Ostermann-Arena =

Indoor sporting arena in Leverkusen, Germany

Coordinates: 51°02′22″N 7°00′13″E

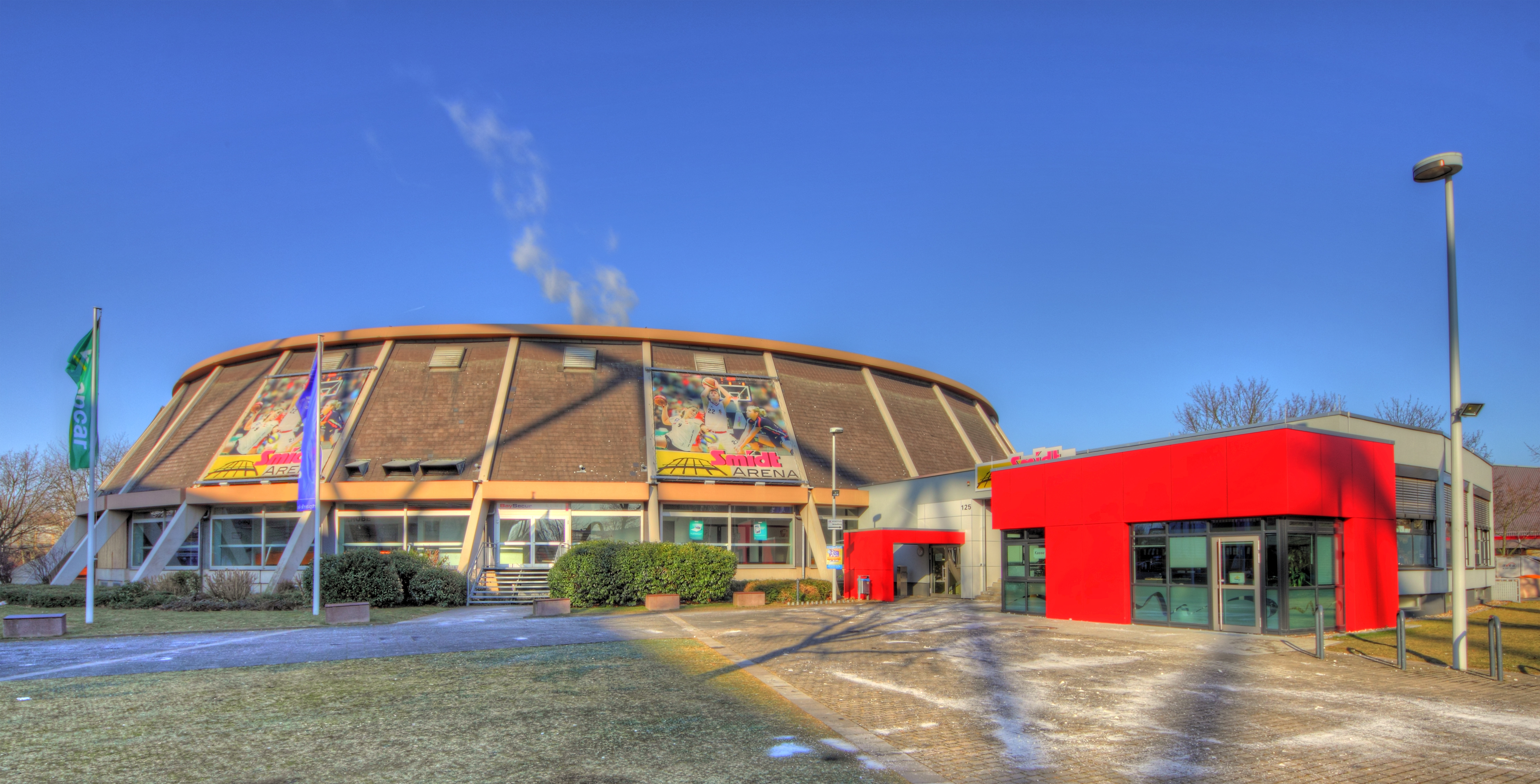
- Interactive map of Ostermann-Arena
- Former names: Wilhelm-Dopatka-Halle (1974–2009); Smidt-Arena (2009–2016)
- Location: Leverkusen, Germany
- Owner: City of Leverkusen
- Operator: City of Leverkusen
- Capacity: 3,500

Website
- http://www.smidt-arena.de

Ostermann-Arena (formerly Wilhelm Dopatka Halle and Smidt-Arena) is an indoor sporting arena located in Leverkusen, Germany. The capacity of the arena is 3,500 people. It is home to the Bayer Giants Leverkusen basketball team.

As Wilhelm Dopatka Halle, it was one of the host arenas for the FIBA EuroBasket 1985.
