= 2025 Grand Slam of Darts =

Darts tournament

2025 Mr Vegas Grand Slam of Darts

Tournament information
- Dates: 8–16 November 2025
- Venue: WV Active Aldersley
- Location: Wolverhampton, England
- Organisation(s): Professional Darts Corporation (PDC)
- Format: Legs
- Prize fund: £650,000
- Winner's share: £150,000
- Nine-dart finish: Luke Humphries
- High checkout: 170; Ricky Evans; Connor Scutt; Gerwyn Price; Michael van Gerwen; Danny Noppert; Lukas Wenig

Champion(s)
- Luke Littler (ENG)

The 2025 Grand Slam of Darts (known for sponsorship reasons as the 2025 Mr Vegas Grand Slam of Darts) was a professional darts tournament that was held at the WV Active Aldersley in Wolverhampton, England, from 8 to 16 November 2025. It was the 19th staging of the Grand Slam by the Professional Darts Corporation (PDC). The total prize fund was £650,000, with the winner receiving £150,000.

The tournament featured 32 players; finalists from televised tournaments, PDC Pro Tour title winners and additional qualifiers were joined by eight Tour Card holder qualifiers. It was the last Grand Slam to feature a 32-player field before the tournament's expansion to 48 players in 2026. Gary Anderson was eliminated in the group stage for the first time in 18 appearances, while Jurjen van der Velde, Niko Springer and Lukas Wenig all reached the knockout stage in their tournament debuts.

Luke Littler was the defending champion, having defeated Martin Lukeman 16–3 in the 2024 final. Following his semi-final victory over Danny Noppert, Littler became the world number one on the PDC Order of Merit for the first time by overtaking Luke Humphries. He also became the youngest PDC world number one at age 18, surpassing Michael van Gerwen who achieved the feat at age 24 in 2014. He successfully retained the title, beating Humphries 16–11 in the final.

Humphries hit a nine-dart finish to win his second group stage match against Michael Smith. Beau Greaves set the record for the highest three-dart average by a female player at a televised PDC event, averaging 102.46 in her group stage loss to Anderson.

== Overview ==
=== Background ===
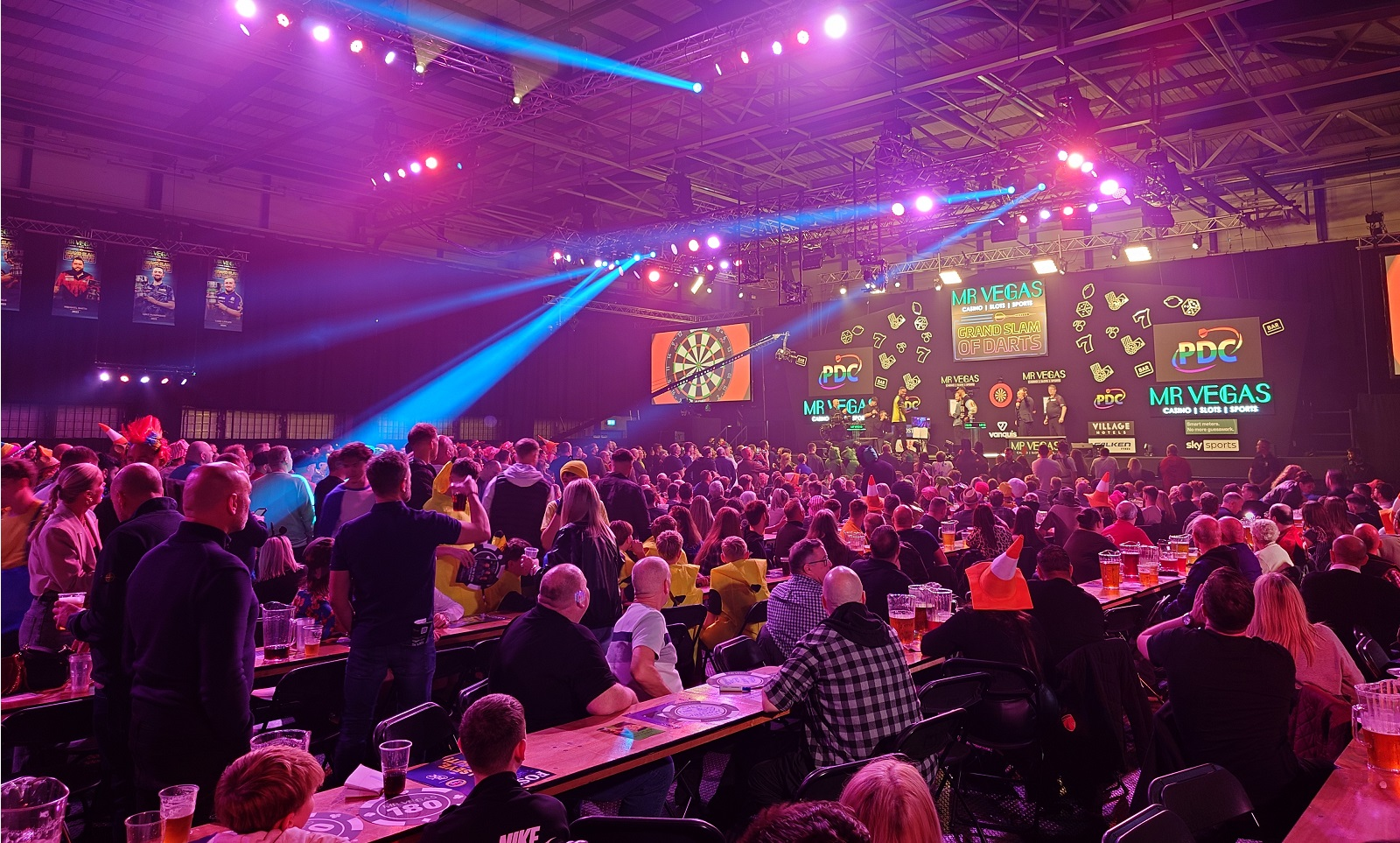
The interior of the WV Active Aldersley in Wolverhampton on night two of the tournament

The 2025 Grand Slam of Darts was the 19th edition of the tournament to be staged by the Professional Darts Corporation (PDC) since the inaugural edition in 2007. First held at the Wolverhampton Civic Hall, the tournament originally involved top darts players from both the PDC and its rival, the British Darts Organisation (BDO). PDC chairman Barry Hearn promoted it as an event "to discover the greatest of them all". The tournament was mostly dominated by PDC representatives with the exception of the 2010 event, where Scott Waites became the first and only BDO player to win the title by overturning an 8–0 deficit to defeat James Wade 16–12 in the final. Following the dissolution of the BDO in 2020, the 2021 event was the first edition to not feature representatives from the organisation, being replaced by additional qualifiers from the PDC's feeder systems. In 2018, the Grand Slam trophy was renamed to the Eric Bristow Trophy in honour of the five-time world champion who died in April the same year.

The 2025 edition took place from 8 to 16 November 2025 at the WV Active Aldersley in Wolverhampton, England. Online casino Mr Vegas, owned by Malta-based gambling company Videoslots, continued its sponsorship of the event after becoming title sponsor in 2023. Luke Littler entered the tournament as defending champion after defeating Martin Lukeman 16–3 in the 2024 final to win his first Grand Slam title – his first major ranking title. It was the last edition of the tournament to feature a 32-player field, with the number of participants increasing to 48 in 2026. Littler was the pre-tournament favourite to win the title, with Sky Sports pundits also predicting Gerwyn Price to claim his fourth Grand Slam. Littler also entered the tournament aiming to become the world number one on the PDC Order of Merit. He achieved this by reaching the final, thereby overcoming the gap of less than £75,000 between him and Luke Humphries at the top of the ranking.

=== Format ===
All matches were in leg play format. The 32 players were drawn into eight groups of four, contested on a round-robin basis where every player faced each other once. Players received two points for a win. The top two players in each respective group qualified for the knockout stage. Two-player ties were first be decided by leg difference, then by looking at who won the match between the two. Three-player ties were decided in the following order: leg difference, legs won, legs won against throw, tournament average, nine-dart shootout (relevant players accumulate a score with nine darts).

The number of legs required to win increased as the tournament progressed:

- Group stage: Best of 9 legs
- Second round: Best of 19 legs
- Quarter-finals, semi-finals and final: Best of 31 legs

=== Prize money ===
The prize fund remained at £650,000, with £150,000 going to the winner. The winner also received the Eric Bristow Trophy.

Position (num. of players)		Prize money (Total: £650,000)
Winner	(1)	£150,000
Runner-up	(1)	£70,000
Semi-finalists	(2)	£50,000
Quarter-finalists	(4)	£25,000
Last 16	(8)	£12,250
Third in group	(8)	£8,000
Fourth in group	(8)	£5,000
Group winner bonus	(8)	£3,500

=== Broadcasts ===
The tournament was broadcast on Sky Sports in the United Kingdom and Ireland. Other broadcasters included DAZN in Germany, Austria and Switzerland; Viaplay in the Netherlands and the Nordic countries; Fox Sports in Australia; Sky Sport in New Zealand; Peacock and FanDuel in the United States; Nova in Czechia and Slovakia; L'Équipe in France; Sport1 in Hungary; VTM in Belgium; and Zonasport in Croatia. It was also available on the PDC's streaming service, PDCTV, for international subscribers outside of the UK, Germany, Austria and Switzerland.

== Qualification ==
The first 24 participants were decided by the following criteria:

- Finalists from PDC televised events over the previous twelve months (up to a maximum of 16 players)
- Additional qualifiers (up to a maximum of 8 players)
- European Tour events winners (to fill up to 24 players)
- Players Championship event winners (to fill up to 24 players)

The list of qualifiers were invited in the following order:

=== Televised event finalists ===
Tournament	Year	Position	Player	Qualifiers
PDC World Darts Championship	2025	Winner	Luke Littler	Luke Littler; Luke Humphries; Gian van Veen; Michael van Gerwen; Josh Rock; Daryl Gurney; Martin Lukeman; James Wade; Jonny Clayton; Gerwyn Price
Grand Slam of Darts	2024	Winner	Luke Littler	Luke Littler; Luke Humphries; Gian van Veen; Michael van Gerwen; Josh Rock; Daryl Gurney; Martin Lukeman; James Wade; Jonny Clayton; Gerwyn Price
Premier League Darts	2025	Winner	Luke Humphries	Luke Littler; Luke Humphries; Gian van Veen; Michael van Gerwen; Josh Rock; Daryl Gurney; Martin Lukeman; James Wade; Jonny Clayton; Gerwyn Price
World Matchplay	2025	Winner	Luke Littler	Luke Littler; Luke Humphries; Gian van Veen; Michael van Gerwen; Josh Rock; Daryl Gurney; Martin Lukeman; James Wade; Jonny Clayton; Gerwyn Price
World Grand Prix	2025	Winner	Luke Littler	Luke Littler; Luke Humphries; Gian van Veen; Michael van Gerwen; Josh Rock; Daryl Gurney; Martin Lukeman; James Wade; Jonny Clayton; Gerwyn Price
World Masters	2025	Winner	Luke Humphries	Luke Littler; Luke Humphries; Gian van Veen; Michael van Gerwen; Josh Rock; Daryl Gurney; Martin Lukeman; James Wade; Jonny Clayton; Gerwyn Price
UK Open	2025	Winner	Luke Littler	Luke Littler; Luke Humphries; Gian van Veen; Michael van Gerwen; Josh Rock; Daryl Gurney; Martin Lukeman; James Wade; Jonny Clayton; Gerwyn Price
European Championship	2025	Winner	Gian van Veen	Luke Littler; Luke Humphries; Gian van Veen; Michael van Gerwen; Josh Rock; Daryl Gurney; Martin Lukeman; James Wade; Jonny Clayton; Gerwyn Price
Players Championship Finals	2024	Winner	Luke Humphries	Luke Littler; Luke Humphries; Gian van Veen; Michael van Gerwen; Josh Rock; Daryl Gurney; Martin Lukeman; James Wade; Jonny Clayton; Gerwyn Price
World Series of Darts Finals	2025	Winner	Michael van Gerwen	Luke Littler; Luke Humphries; Gian van Veen; Michael van Gerwen; Josh Rock; Daryl Gurney; Martin Lukeman; James Wade; Jonny Clayton; Gerwyn Price
PDC World Cup of Darts	2025	Winners	Josh Rock; Daryl Gurney	Luke Littler; Luke Humphries; Gian van Veen; Michael van Gerwen; Josh Rock; Daryl Gurney; Martin Lukeman; James Wade; Jonny Clayton; Gerwyn Price
PDC World Darts Championship	2025	Runner-up	Michael van Gerwen	Luke Littler; Luke Humphries; Gian van Veen; Michael van Gerwen; Josh Rock; Daryl Gurney; Martin Lukeman; James Wade; Jonny Clayton; Gerwyn Price
Grand Slam of Darts	2024	Runner-up	Martin Lukeman	Luke Littler; Luke Humphries; Gian van Veen; Michael van Gerwen; Josh Rock; Daryl Gurney; Martin Lukeman; James Wade; Jonny Clayton; Gerwyn Price
Premier League Darts	2025	Runner-up	Luke Littler	Luke Littler; Luke Humphries; Gian van Veen; Michael van Gerwen; Josh Rock; Daryl Gurney; Martin Lukeman; James Wade; Jonny Clayton; Gerwyn Price
World Matchplay	2025	Runner-up	James Wade	Luke Littler; Luke Humphries; Gian van Veen; Michael van Gerwen; Josh Rock; Daryl Gurney; Martin Lukeman; James Wade; Jonny Clayton; Gerwyn Price
World Grand Prix	2025	Runner-up	Luke Humphries	Luke Littler; Luke Humphries; Gian van Veen; Michael van Gerwen; Josh Rock; Daryl Gurney; Martin Lukeman; James Wade; Jonny Clayton; Gerwyn Price
World Masters	2025	Runner-up	Jonny Clayton	Luke Littler; Luke Humphries; Gian van Veen; Michael van Gerwen; Josh Rock; Daryl Gurney; Martin Lukeman; James Wade; Jonny Clayton; Gerwyn Price
UK Open	2025	Runner-up	James Wade	Luke Littler; Luke Humphries; Gian van Veen; Michael van Gerwen; Josh Rock; Daryl Gurney; Martin Lukeman; James Wade; Jonny Clayton; Gerwyn Price
European Championship	2025	Runner-up	Luke Humphries	Luke Littler; Luke Humphries; Gian van Veen; Michael van Gerwen; Josh Rock; Daryl Gurney; Martin Lukeman; James Wade; Jonny Clayton; Gerwyn Price
Players Championship Finals	2024	Runner-up	Luke Littler	Luke Littler; Luke Humphries; Gian van Veen; Michael van Gerwen; Josh Rock; Daryl Gurney; Martin Lukeman; James Wade; Jonny Clayton; Gerwyn Price
World Series of Darts Finals	2025	Runner-up	Luke Littler	Luke Littler; Luke Humphries; Gian van Veen; Michael van Gerwen; Josh Rock; Daryl Gurney; Martin Lukeman; James Wade; Jonny Clayton; Gerwyn Price
PDC World Cup of Darts	2025	Runners-up	Jonny Clayton; Gerwyn Price	Luke Littler; Luke Humphries; Gian van Veen; Michael van Gerwen; Josh Rock; Daryl Gurney; Martin Lukeman; James Wade; Jonny Clayton; Gerwyn Price

=== Additional qualifiers ===
Tournament	Year	Position	Player
PDC World Youth Championship	2024	Winner	Gian van Veen
PDC World Youth Championship	2024	Runner-up	Jurjen van der Velde
Women's World Matchplay	2025	Winner	Lisa Ashton
PDC Development Tour	2025	Order of Merit Winner	Cam Crabtree
PDC Challenge Tour	2025	Order of Merit Winner	Stefan Bellmont
PDC Women's Series	2025	Order of Merit Winner	Beau Greaves
PDC Asian Championship	2025	Runner-up	Alexis Toylo (Note: Alexis Toylo replaced Lourence Ilagan, who withdrew for medical reasons.)
CDC Continental Cup	2025	Winner	Alex Spellman

=== European Tour ===
As the list of qualifiers from the main tournaments produced fewer than the required number of players (24), the field was filled from the reserve lists. The first list consisted of the winners from 2025 European Tour events, in which the winners were ordered firstly by number of wins, then PDC Order of Merit position order at the cut-off date.

Event	Player	Qualifiers
Belgian Darts Open	Luke Littler	Nathan Aspinall; Stephen Bunting; Gary Anderson; Martin Schindler Niko Springer
European Darts Trophy	Nathan Aspinall	Nathan Aspinall; Stephen Bunting; Gary Anderson; Martin Schindler Niko Springer
International Darts Open	Stephen Bunting	Nathan Aspinall; Stephen Bunting; Gary Anderson; Martin Schindler Niko Springer
German Darts Grand Prix	Michael van Gerwen	Nathan Aspinall; Stephen Bunting; Gary Anderson; Martin Schindler Niko Springer
Austrian Darts Open	Martin Schindler	Nathan Aspinall; Stephen Bunting; Gary Anderson; Martin Schindler Niko Springer
European Darts Grand Prix	Gary Anderson	Nathan Aspinall; Stephen Bunting; Gary Anderson; Martin Schindler Niko Springer
Dutch Darts Championship	Jonny Clayton	Nathan Aspinall; Stephen Bunting; Gary Anderson; Martin Schindler Niko Springer
European Darts Open	Nathan Aspinall (2)	Nathan Aspinall; Stephen Bunting; Gary Anderson; Martin Schindler Niko Springer
Baltic Sea Darts Open	Gerwyn Price	Nathan Aspinall; Stephen Bunting; Gary Anderson; Martin Schindler Niko Springer
Flanders Darts Trophy	Luke Littler (2)	Nathan Aspinall; Stephen Bunting; Gary Anderson; Martin Schindler Niko Springer
Czech Darts Open	Luke Humphries	Nathan Aspinall; Stephen Bunting; Gary Anderson; Martin Schindler Niko Springer
Hungarian Darts Trophy	Niko Springer	Nathan Aspinall; Stephen Bunting; Gary Anderson; Martin Schindler Niko Springer
Swiss Darts Trophy	Stephen Bunting (2)	Nathan Aspinall; Stephen Bunting; Gary Anderson; Martin Schindler Niko Springer
German Darts Championship	Nathan Aspinall (3)	Nathan Aspinall; Stephen Bunting; Gary Anderson; Martin Schindler Niko Springer
Note: Players in italics had already qualified for the tournament.

=== Players Championships ===
As there were still not enough qualifiers after European Tour events were added, the winners of 2025 Players Championship events were added, firstly in order by number of wins, then in Order of Merit order.

Tournament	Event	Position	Player	Qualifiers
2025 PDC Pro Tour
2025 PDC Pro Tour	Players Championship 1	Winner	Rob Cross	Chris Dobey; Damon Heta
2025 PDC Pro Tour	Players Championship 2	Winner	Gerwyn Price	Chris Dobey; Damon Heta
2025 PDC Pro Tour	Players Championship 3	Winner	Chris Dobey	Chris Dobey; Damon Heta
2025 PDC Pro Tour	Players Championship 4	Winner	Ryan Searle	Chris Dobey; Damon Heta
2025 PDC Pro Tour	Players Championship 5	Winner	Joe Cullen	Chris Dobey; Damon Heta
2025 PDC Pro Tour	Players Championship 6	Winner	Gian van Veen	Chris Dobey; Damon Heta
2025 PDC Pro Tour	Players Championship 7	Winner	Gary Anderson	Chris Dobey; Damon Heta
2025 PDC Pro Tour	Players Championship 8	Winner	Martin Schindler	Chris Dobey; Damon Heta
2025 PDC Pro Tour	Players Championship 9	Winner	Gerwyn Price (2)	Chris Dobey; Damon Heta
2025 PDC Pro Tour	Players Championship 10	Winner	Josh Rock	Chris Dobey; Damon Heta
2025 PDC Pro Tour	Players Championship 11	Winner	Cameron Menzies	Chris Dobey; Damon Heta
2025 PDC Pro Tour	Players Championship 12	Winner	Gerwyn Price (3)	Chris Dobey; Damon Heta
2025 PDC Pro Tour	Players Championship 13	Winner	Damon Heta	Chris Dobey; Damon Heta
2025 PDC Pro Tour	Players Championship 14	Winner	Jonny Clayton	Chris Dobey; Damon Heta
2025 PDC Pro Tour	Players Championship 15	Winner	Krzysztof Ratajski	Chris Dobey; Damon Heta
2025 PDC Pro Tour	Players Championship 16	Winner	Ross Smith	Chris Dobey; Damon Heta
2025 PDC Pro Tour	Players Championship 17	Winner	Chris Dobey (2)	Chris Dobey; Damon Heta
2025 PDC Pro Tour	Players Championship 18	Winner	Stephen Bunting	Chris Dobey; Damon Heta
2025 PDC Pro Tour	Players Championship 19	Winner	James Wade	Chris Dobey; Damon Heta
2025 PDC Pro Tour	Players Championship 20	Winner	Damon Heta (2)	Chris Dobey; Damon Heta
2025 PDC Pro Tour	Players Championship 21	Winner	Bradley Brooks	Chris Dobey; Damon Heta
2025 PDC Pro Tour	Players Championship 22	Winner	Sebastian Białecki	Chris Dobey; Damon Heta
2025 PDC Pro Tour	Players Championship 23	Winner	Jermaine Wattimena	Chris Dobey; Damon Heta
2025 PDC Pro Tour	Players Championship 24	Winner	Jeffrey de Graaf	Chris Dobey; Damon Heta
2025 PDC Pro Tour	Players Championship 25	Winner	Stephen Bunting (2)	Chris Dobey; Damon Heta
2025 PDC Pro Tour	Players Championship 26	Winner	Gerwyn Price (4)	Chris Dobey; Damon Heta
2025 PDC Pro Tour	Players Championship 27	Winner	Joe Cullen (2)	Chris Dobey; Damon Heta
2025 PDC Pro Tour	Players Championship 28	Winner	Ryan Searle (2)	Chris Dobey; Damon Heta
2025 PDC Pro Tour	Players Championship 29	Winner	Ross Smith (2)	Chris Dobey; Damon Heta
2025 PDC Pro Tour	Players Championship 30	Winner	Wessel Nijman	Chris Dobey; Damon Heta
2025 PDC Pro Tour	Players Championship 31	Winner	Jermaine Wattimena (2)	Chris Dobey; Damon Heta
2025 PDC Pro Tour	Players Championship 32	Winner	Luke Littler	Chris Dobey; Damon Heta
2025 PDC Pro Tour	Players Championship 33	Winner	Chris Dobey (3)	Chris Dobey; Damon Heta
2025 PDC Pro Tour	Players Championship 34	Winner	Wessel Nijman (2)	Chris Dobey; Damon Heta
Note: Players in italics had already qualified for the tournament.				Chris Dobey; Damon Heta

Ranking of Players Championship winners
Player	PC event wins	OoM ranking
Chris Dobey	3	8
Damon Heta	2	12
Ross Smith	2	15
Ryan Searle	2	18
Jermaine Wattimena	2	21
Joe Cullen	2	31
Wessel Nijman	2	34
Rob Cross	1	9
Cameron Menzies	1	26
Krzysztof Ratajski	1	36
Jeffrey de Graaf	1	49
Bradley Brooks	1	72
Sebastian Białecki	1	80
Gerwyn Price	4	TV
Stephen Bunting	2	ET
Luke Littler	1	TV
James Wade	1	TV
Jonny Clayton	1	TV
Gian van Veen	1	TV
Josh Rock	1	TV
Gary Anderson	1	ET
Martin Schindler	1	ET

=== PDC Tour Card holder qualifying event ===
A further eight places were filled by qualifiers from a PDC Tour Card holder qualifier held on 31 October in Wigan. Rob Cross, Ross Smith, Mike De Decker, Dave Chisnall, Jermaine Wattimena, Dimitri Van den Bergh, Cameron Menzies, Dirk van Duijvenbode, Peter Wright, Joe Cullen and Raymond van Barneveld were among the notable players to not make it through the qualifier.

The qualifiers were:

- Ricky Evans
- Luke Woodhouse
- Connor Scutt
- Wessel Nijman
- Danny Noppert
- Karel Sedláček
- Michael Smith
- Lukas Wenig

== Pools ==
The top eight qualified players, based on their PDC Order of Merit ranking, were seeded into the group stage, with the other 24 participants being split into pools based on their ranking. Each group consisted of one player from each pool.

Pool A	Pool B	Pool C	Pool D
(Seeded Players)	(Qualifiers)		
Luke Humphries (1) Luke Littler (2) Michael van Gerwen (3) Stephen Bunting (4); James Wade (5) Jonny Clayton (6) Gian van Veen (7) Chris Dobey (8)	Josh Rock; Danny Noppert; Damon Heta; Gary Anderson; Gerwyn Price; Martin Schindler; Nathan Aspinall; Daryl Gurney	Luke Woodhouse; Michael Smith; Wessel Nijman; Martin Lukeman; Ricky Evans; Connor Scutt; Niko Springer; Lukas Wenig	Karel Sedláček; Cam Crabtree; Stefan Bellmont; Beau Greaves; Jurjen van der Velde; Lisa Ashton; Alexis Toylo; Alex Spellman

== Summary ==
=== Groups ===
The group stage began on 8 November. The first set of group stage matches was played on 8 November, the second set was played on 9 November, and the third set was played across 10 and 11 November.

==== Groups A–D ====
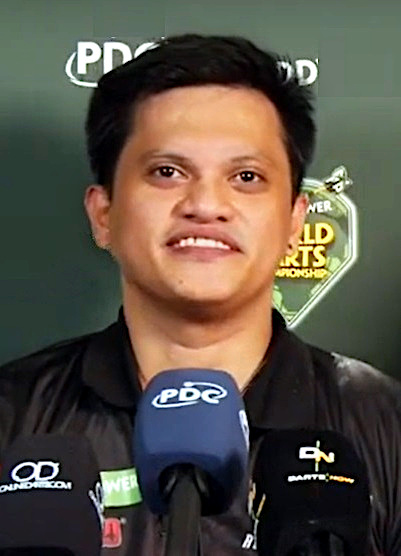
Alexis Toylo (pictured in 2024) became the first Asian player to win a match at the Grand Slam of Darts by defeating Stephen Bunting in his opening game.

Group A featured 2023 champion Luke Humphries, Nathan Aspinall, 2022 champion Michael Smith and Alex Spellman. Smith was competing in his first televised tournament since the UK Open in March after coming through the Tour Card holder qualifier. Humphries, the world number one, whitewashed Spellman in his opening match, while Smith defeated Aspinall 5–3 in a repeat of the 2022 final. In a post-match interview with Viaplay, Smith declared that he was "a fighter" and expressed his frustrations with his lack of televised appearances: "I just want to be competing. I'm sick of sitting at home watching people win tournaments and I'm sat at home." On day two, Humphries hit a nine-dart finish—his second televised nine-darter—to clinch a 5–3 victory against Smith for his second win in Group A. Humphries described the contest as "the weirdest game of darts [he'd] been involved in" due to a poor start on the doubles and the subsequent perfect leg. "To then go on and hit a nine-darter, that's why darts is one of the best sports in the world," he proclaimed. Aspinall kept himself in the Group A qualification race with a 5–2 win over Spellman. Humphries finished top of Group A after defeating Aspinall 5–3 in a match where both players had three-dart averages over 100, as Smith secured qualification by defeating Spellman 5–2 to finish in second place.

Group B featured Chris Dobey, Damon Heta, Martin Lukeman and Jurjen van der Velde. Dobey opened his campaign with a 5–1 win against Van der Velde, while 2024 runner-up Lukeman lost to Heta by the same scoreline. Lukeman then lost 5–4 to Van der Velde in a result that eliminated him from the qualification race, as Dobey beat Heta 5–1 to progress to the knockout stage, setting up a shoot-out between Van der Velde and Heta for the second spot. Dobey earned his third win by defeating Lukeman 5–1 to top the group. In the group's deciding match, world number 147 Van der Velde claimed the second qualifying place by beating Heta 5–3, advancing to the last 16 in his tournament debut.

Group C featured Stephen Bunting, Martin Schindler, Luke Woodhouse and Alexis Toylo. Toylo of the Philippines earned an upset victory over Bunting in a deciding leg in Group C, becoming the first Asian player to win a match in the event's history. Woodhouse defeated Schindler 5–2 to end the opening day at the top of the group. Bunting suffered another deciding loss to Schindler that eliminated him from the tournament, as Woodhouse secured qualification by beating Toylo 5–2. Bunting's third consecutive 5–4 defeat came against group winner Woodhouse, while Schindler won his shoot-out match with Toylo 5–2 to finish in second place and reach the knockout stage for the first time.

Group D featured James Wade, three-time champion Gerwyn Price, Ricky Evans and Stefan Bellmont. Price hit a 167 checkout but was beaten 5–4 by Evans in his opening match, while Wade missed four match darts as he lost to Bellmont by the same scoreline. Price recovered with a whitewash win against Wade in his second match, eliminating Wade from contention. Evans converted a 170 checkout on his way to beating Bellmont in a deciding leg to advance, which set up a match between Price and Bellmont for the second qualification spot in Group D. Despite losing his first match, Price finished top of the group with a 5–1 win over Bellmont, as Evans fell to second place due to a 5–2 loss to Wade.

==== Groups E–H ====
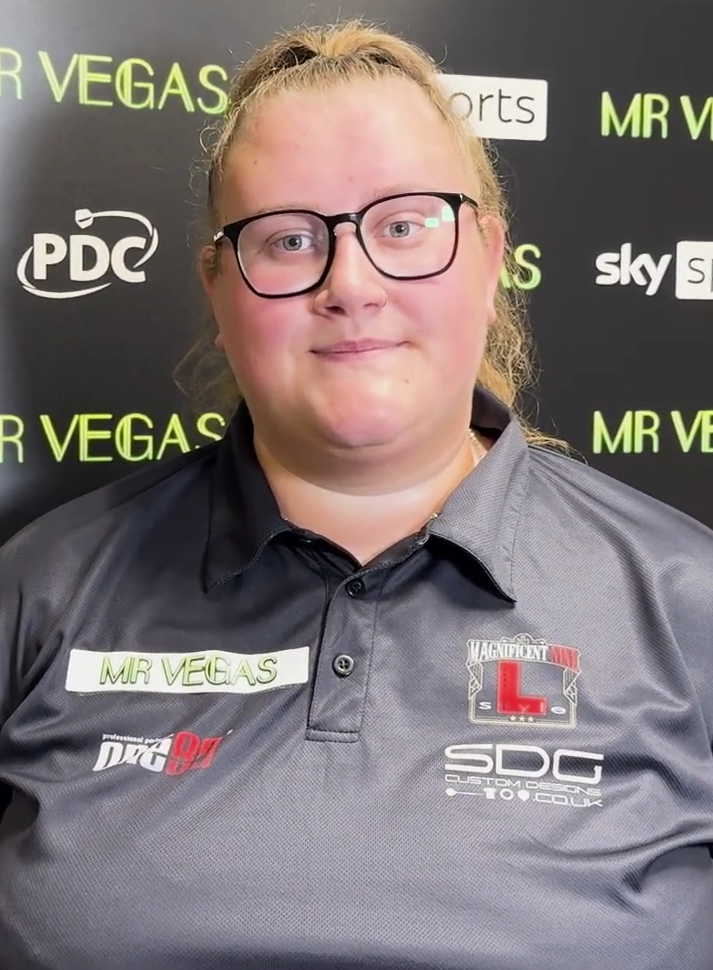
Beau Greaves (pictured in 2024) recorded the highest three-dart average by a female player at a televised PDC event, averaging 102.46 in her 5–4 loss to Gary Anderson.

Group E featured defending champion Luke Littler, Daryl Gurney, Connor Scutt and Karel Sedláček. Littler began his Group E campaign with a 5–1 win over Sedláček, later admitting that he was "obviously looking for the whitewash". Gurney missed a match dart whilst 4–3 up against Scutt, with Scutt taking advantage to claim victory in a deciding leg. Scutt hit a 170 checkout to level his meeting with Littler at 1–1 but would ultimately lose 5–3, as the defending champion secured qualification to the knockout stage. Gurney was eliminated following a 5–3 loss to Sedláček, who won five legs in a row and secured victory with his 11th match dart. Littler defeated Gurney 5–2 to win Group E and was joined by Scutt, who earned a 5–3 victory over Sedláček to qualify.

Group F featured Gian van Veen, Josh Rock, Wessel Nijman and Lisa Ashton. Newly-crowned European champion Van Veen almost suffered an upset loss to Ashton as the Women's World Matchplay champion led 4–3, but Van Veen took the next two legs to avoid defeat. Despite averaging 109, Rock lost to Nijman in a deciding leg. In their second match-ups, Van Veen averaged 107 in his 5–3 over Nijman and Rock whitewashed Ashton, which meant that Van Veen, Nijman and Rock were all still in contention to qualify heading into the final day of group stage action. Rock and Nijman would progress from Group F as Rock eliminated Van Veen through a 5–2 win to top the group while Nijman confirmed his qualification by defeating Ashton.

Group G featured three-time champion Michael van Gerwen, Gary Anderson, Niko Springer and Beau Greaves. In his opening match, Van Gerwen held a 4–2 lead against Greaves but was taken to a deciding leg, where Greaves was unable to convert a 52 checkout for the victory and Van Gerwen ultimately won 5–4. Tournament debutant Springer landed a 152 checkout on his way to beating Anderson to lead Group G ahead of Van Gerwen. Greaves was beaten in another deciding leg by Anderson, with Van Gerwen's 5–4 loss to Springer ensuring her elimination from Group G. Despite the defeat, Greaves set the record for the highest three-dart average by a female player in a televised PDC event, averaging 102.46 to beat Fallon Sherrock's 101.55 that she registered at the 2021 Grand Slam. Speaking about Greaves, Anderson said: "She's going to cause so much trouble next year in the Pro Tour." She earned a consolation win against Springer in her final game after going 3–0 down, which allowed Van Gerwen to top the group following his 5–2 victory over Anderson in which he averaged 108.45. Anderson finished bottom of Group G, marking the first time he had been eliminated in the group stage in 18 Grand Slam appearances.

Group H featured Jonny Clayton, Danny Noppert, Lukas Wenig and Cam Crabtree. Noppert survived seven match darts from tournament debutant Wenig to win his opening match, with Cam Crabtree's 5–1 victory over Jonny Clayton placing Noppert in second place. Clayton's elimination was confirmed following a 5–3 defeat to Wenig, while Noppert secured qualification with his second 5–4 win. Clayton managed to pick up a 5–4 victory over Noppert in his closing group stage match, allowing Wenig to win the group after he defeated Crabtree 5–1 to qualify.

=== Second round ===
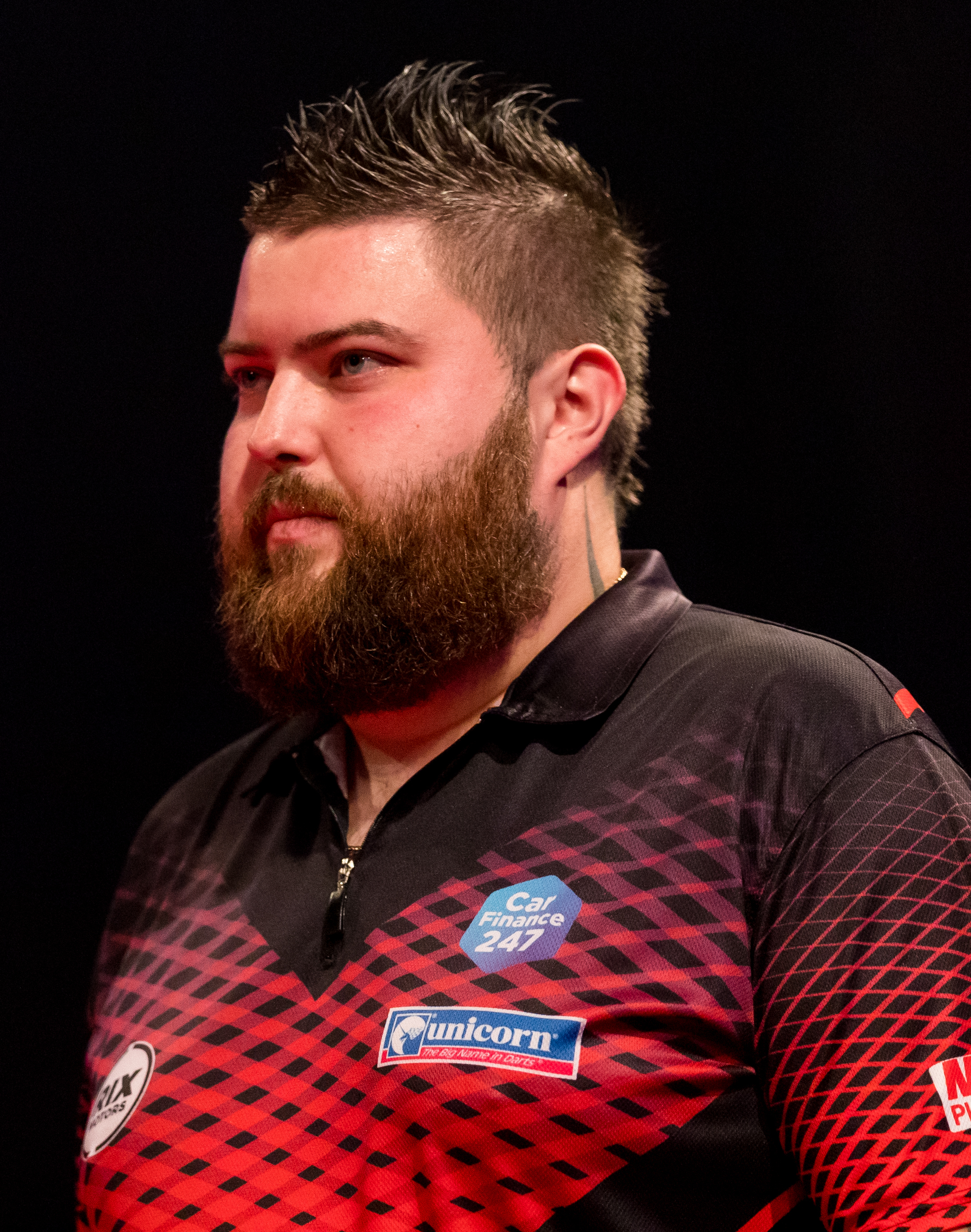
Michael Smith (pictured in 2019) defeated Chris Dobey 10–9 in the second round after the pair missed a total of 20 match darts.

The second round was played on 12 and 13 November. After levelling his match with Chris Dobey at 5–5 through a 164 checkout, Michael Smith eventually went one leg away from victory at 9–8, but the former champion missed two match darts as Dobey forced a deciding leg. The decider brought a dramatic ending in which the pair missed a further 18 darts at double—11 from Dobey—to end the match, before Smith hit double 4 to win 10–9. "I should never have been in that match or been in front, I should never have won, but I will take it," Smith stated after the match. Luke Humphries raced into a 7–0 lead against Jurjen van der Velde, who celebrated mockingly after registering his first leg and later hitting a 164 checkout. Humphries eventually secured a 10–3 victory, averaging 108.55 and hitting seven maximums. Despite the comfortable win, Humphries disclosed that he had been suffering from a suspected back spasm and had considered withdrawing from the tournament. "I have no idea how I made that happen. When I woke up this morning, I couldn't lift my head off the pillow," he explained, before thanking his physiotherapist for helping him recover. Luke Woodhouse went 8–5 ahead against Ricky Evans but missed two darts to make it 9–5. Evans then staged a comeback, bringing the match to a deciding leg where he hit a 76 checkout to win 10–9 and reach the quarter-finals of the tournament for the first time; Evans called the match "good fun". Gerwyn Price took a 5–1 lead against Martin Schindler, who was able to reduce the deficit to 6–5 before Price converted a 170 checkout. From 7–6, Price claimed the next three legs to take the 10–6 victory, winning the final leg in 11 darts. On facing Evans in the next round of his "favourite tournament", Price believed that the longer format of the quarter-finals would work in his favour.

Luke Littler established a 5–0 lead against Wessel Nijman to open their match. Nijman was able to win three of the next four legs, but missed three darts at double in the tenth leg to break throw and reduce his deficit to 6–4, allowing Littler to extend his advantage to 7–3. The defending champion would complete a 10–4 victory with a 96 checkout, ending the match with an 83 per cent success rate on doubles and a three-dart average of 105.38. The all-Dutch clash between Michael van Gerwen and Danny Noppert began with four ton-plus checkouts in the opening five legs: Van Gerwen and Noppert hit 170 checkouts in the first and third legs respectively, with Van Gerwen also taking out 160 and Noppert 101. Van Gerwen missed an opportunity to break throw as Noppert went 6–4 ahead. Noppert then took full control by claiming three legs in a row before completing a 10–6 win. It was Van Gerwen's last match before the 2026 World Championship due to him not qualifying for the Players Championship Finals. Noppert described the match as a "rollercoaster" and believed there would be "problems for everyone" if he maintained his form. Josh Rock took leads of 3–0 and 8–5 against Connor Scutt but was pushed to a deciding leg, in which Rock held throw with a 14-dart leg, pinning double 9 to advance 10–9. Rock, who ended the match with an average of 89, claimed that he had "never missed the treble 20 as much in [his] life", adding that he needed to "wake up after that game". Lukas Wenig found a 154 checkout to level his match against German compatriot Niko Springer at 5–5, later breaking throw for a 9–7 buffer and then winning 10–8 to progress to his first major quarter-final.

=== Quarter-finals ===
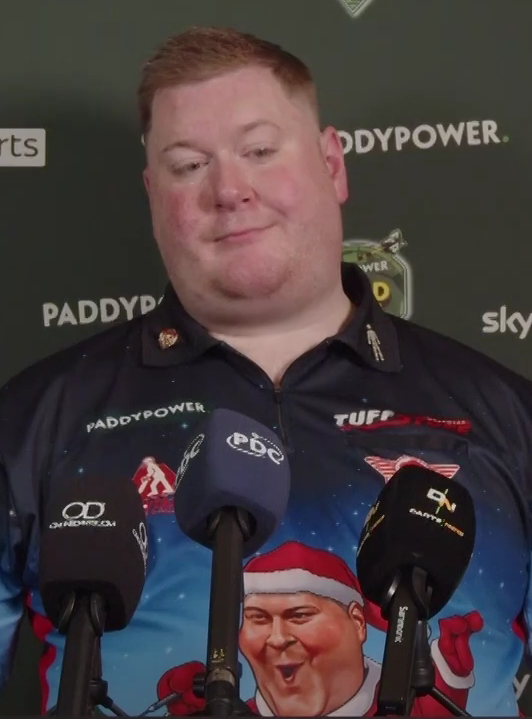
Ricky Evans (pictured in 2024) reached his first Grand Slam quarter-final.

The quarter-finals were played on 14 and 15 November. In a battle of former Grand Slam champions, Luke Humphries led 4–0 in the opening stages of his match against Michael Smith. The pair exchanged holds of throw in the second session as Humphries went 7–3 ahead. In the next leg, the two players both went six darts into a nine-darter attempt, with Smith pinning the subsequent treble 20 and treble 19 before narrowly missing double 12; Humphries's attempt ended on the seventh dart. Smith was able to battle back to 7–7, but a 138 checkout from Humphries to break throw stopped him from taking the lead. This was the first of nine legs that Humphries won out of the next ten as he raced to a 16–8 victory, averaging 104.98 on his way there. Humphries admitted that he "let [his] guard down a bit" after the eleventh leg but still deemed it a "solid performance". He also shared that he was considering missing all 34 Players Championship events in 2026 due to his busy schedule, stating: "I might just give it a go at the start and see how it goes and if it doesn't go my way then maybe just give it a miss and just focus on everything else." In a rematch of their Group D meeting, Gerwyn Price established a 4–0 lead against Ricky Evans, maintaining his four-leg lead at 7–3 despite Evans improving. Evans reduced the deficit by one at 9–6, but the three-time champion was still in control on his way to 12–8. Price would eventually win the match 16–9 with a 12-dart leg and a 101 checkout. "I love Ricky, he's a great player, he's in some great form. He's been fantastic over the last couple of months," Price said in admiration after the match, while also lamenting that on both occasions Evans played well during the tournament, it was against him. He also expressed his desire to win a fourth Grand Slam title: "I'm here to win it. I'm not here just to take part. I haven't fired on all cylinders yet."

Luke Littler and Josh Rock, two former World Youth champions, had a close opening session, with Rock taking out an 84 finish to lead 3–2. A 78 checkout from Littler levelled the match at 5–5. Rock capitalised on a missed double by Littler in the 14th leg to break throw and then establish a three-leg lead at 9–6. However, Littler would then claim seven legs in a row, and although Rock won three more legs, Littler pinned double 10 for a 16–12 victory. The pair combined for a total of 23 maximums—11 from Littler and 12 from Rock—and both averaged over 100. Littler recalled "giving [him]self absolute hell at 9–6 down" but "couldn't ask for anything better" than the comeback win. Lukas Wenig began his rematch with Danny Noppert with a 130 checkout on the bullseye, but three 76 checkouts from Noppert saw him lead 3–2. From 6–4, Noppert won the next five legs to go another five away from victory. Although Wenig produced a 170 checkout in the 16th leg, as well as finishes of 129 and 104, Noppert hit double 4 to confirm his place in the semi-finals with a 16–8 win. Noppert declared that he was "really proud to be in the semi-finals", adding: "I think I'm in the best form of my life and I always believe in myself, so I'm really pleased with everything."

=== Semi-finals ===
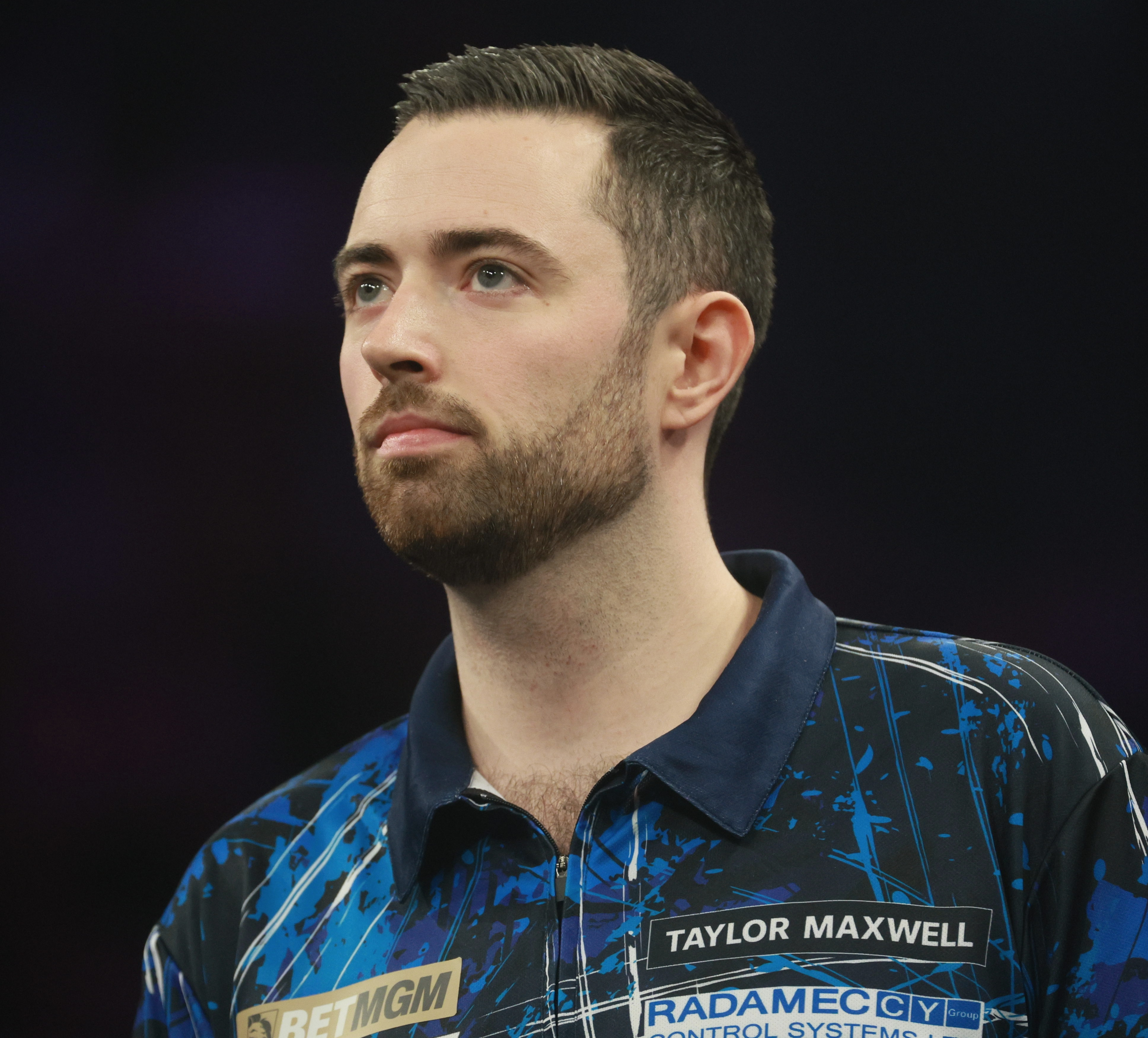
Luke Humphries (pictured), who hit a nine-dart finish in the group stage, defeated Gerwyn Price 16–13 to advance to the final.

The semi-finals were played in the afternoon session on 16 November. Luke Humphries faced Gerwyn Price and Luke Littler faced Danny Noppert. Humphries was competing in his third Grand Slam semi-final in four years and Price was competing in his fourth overall; Price went on to win the title in the three previous years he had reached the last four. Defending champion Littler reached a second successive Grand Slam semi-final, putting him one win away from overtaking Humphries on the PDC Order of Merit and becoming world number one. Noppert reached the semi-finals of the tournament for the first time, marking his fifth televised semi-final of 2025 after the World Masters, World Cup (with Gian van Veen), World Grand Prix and European Championship.

Humphries landed a 142 checkout on his way to going 5–1 ahead against Price. The three-time champion was able to find breaks of throw as he attempted to reduce the deficit, but Humphries stayed in front and found a break of his own in the 24th leg for 14–11. Humphries then pinned double 5 for a 16–13 victory. The 2023 champion defied four ton-plus checkouts from Price by averaging 106.25 and hitting 16 maximums. Sky Sports pundit Mark Webster called Humphries's performance a "brilliant display" and said that it was "what we associate with Luke Humphries". Commenting on the world number one race, he stated: "In the scale of things, does it matter? You're going to keep winning events and put yourself back in the equation." Humphries discussed the possibility of it being his last day as world number one in his post-match interview. He claimed that he was focusing on winning the title, but also said he would be fighting to take his spot back: "I'll be fighting hard, it's a war now."

Noppert took an early 3–2 lead against Littler and broke throw to extend his advantage to 6–4. However, at 8–6 down, Littler took control and claimed 10 of the next 11 legs as he raced to a 16–9 win. This victory guaranteed that Littler would overtake Humphries on the PDC Order of Merit regardless of the result of the final, cementing Littler as the new world number one. "It's not even been two years on the tour and I'm already world number one. That's job done. But now I've got a bigger match later tonight," Littler remarked after the match, later calling himself "the best in the world".

=== Final ===
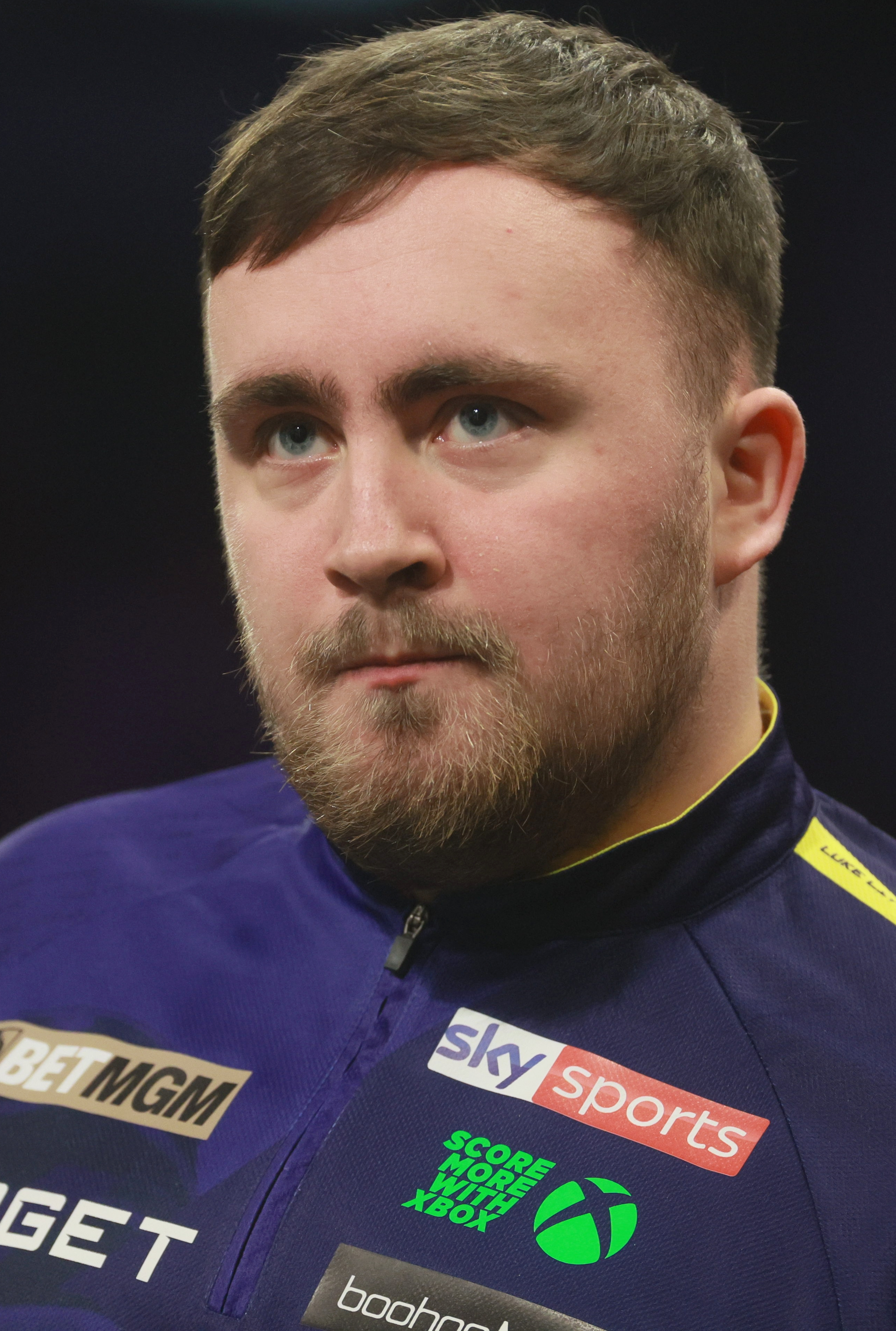
Luke Littler (pictured), the new world number one, retained the title by beating Luke Humphries 16–11 in the final.

The final between Luke Humphries and Luke Littler was played in the evening session on 16 November. It was the sixth major final contested between the pair, adding to their meetings at the 2024 World Championship, two Premier League finals, the 2024 Players Championship Finals and the 2025 World Grand Prix. Humphries was competing in his second Grand Slam final, having defeated Rob Cross 16–8 in the 2023 final to win the tournament for the first time. The Grand Slam final was also his third consecutive ranking major final after finishing runner-up at the World Grand Prix and the European Championship. Littler reached a second straight final, having defeated Martin Lukeman to triumph in 2024. Humphries was looking to win his third major title of 2025, having already won the World Masters and the Premier League. Littler was seeking his fifth major title of the year, having won the World Championship, UK Open, World Matchplay and World Grand Prix.

Littler quickly established a 2–0 lead in the final, but Humphries responded by winning the next four legs to go 4–2 ahead. The two players' efficiency on the doubles declined in the second session, although Humphries would take out a 112 finish to level at 5–5 after Littler regained his lead. Humphries landed a 79 checkout and completed successive 12-dart legs on his way to 8–6, just for Littler to restore parity at 8–8 with a 167 finish. The defending champion then went seven darts into a nine-dart finish in the 19th leg, missing the eighth. The tie shifted in Littler's favour in the 20th leg, as Humphries opted to go for a 170 checkout while having a firm lead. An unsuccessful finish and subsequent set-up mishaps allowed Littler to hit a 160 checkout to go 11–9 up. Littler proceeded to win four of the next five legs to go one away from the title. Humphries would claim leg 26 but was unable to stop Littler, who converted a 96 checkout on double 9 to win 16–11. Littler finished the match with an average of 100.61 and 15 maximums.

Littler retained the title—the first time he had retained a PDC major title—for his second Grand Slam triumph, extending his unbeaten record at the tournament to 14 matches. Littler became the fourth player to defend the Grand Slam, after Phil Taylor, Michael van Gerwen and Gerwyn Price. It was his fifth major title of 2025, becoming the third player to win five majors in a single year, after Taylor and Van Gerwen. It was his eighth major title overall, as well as the 16th title won by either Littler or Humphries in the last 23 major tournaments. In addition to securing the title, Littler finished the tournament as the new world number one on the PDC Order of Merit, making him the 14th different player in PDC history to top the ranking. The tournament marked the end of Humphries's 682-day reign as world number one, having taken the top spot at the 2024 World Championship. 18-year-old Littler became the youngest player to achieve the feat, surpassing Van Gerwen's record from when he became world number one at age 24 in 2014. The £150,000 top prize saw Littler's total amount of prize money on his ranking rise to £1,850,000. "Now I'm number one, I'm hungry to stay there. I want to be there for the next few years," Littler said after the final, mentioning that there was going to be a "target on [his] back from Luke [Humphries] and all the other players". Despite the defeat, Humphries remained motivated and declared that he was "going to go to war" with Littler at the upcoming World Championship. The two also shared the belief that they were in a league of their own, with Littler noting: "The finals show it, the stats show it and like Luke [Humphries] said, if everyone is getting bored of me and him then someone needs to stop us otherwise we're going to keep winning."

== Draw ==
The results of the group stage and knockout stage are shown below. Numbers in brackets show the seedings for the top eight players in the tournament. Figures next to a player's name state their three-dart average in a match. Players in bold denote match winners.

=== Group stage ===
The group stage draw was announced on 3 November.

All group matches are best of nine legs.
After three games, the top two in each group qualify for the knock-out stage.

NB: P = Played; W = Won; L = Lost; LF = Legs for; LA = Legs against; +/− = Plus/minus record, in relation to legs; Pts = Points; Status = Qualified to knockout stage

==== Group A ====
Pos.	Player	P	W	L	LF	LA	+/−	Pts	Status
1	**Luke Humphries (1)**	3	3	0	15	6	+9	**6**	**Q**
2	**Michael Smith**	3	2	1	13	10	+3	**4**	**Q**
3	Nathan Aspinall	3	1	2	11	12	–1	**2**	**Eliminated**
4	Alex Spellman	3	0	3	4	15	–11	**0**	**Eliminated**

8 November

Nathan Aspinall 89.08	3–**5**	**Michael Smith** 88.21
**Luke Humphries** 95.13	**5**–0	Alex Spellman 77.04

9 November

**Nathan Aspinall** 91.05	**5**–2	Alex Spellman 84.64
**Luke Humphries** 92.35	**5**–3	Michael Smith 87.84

10 November

**Michael Smith** 90.60	**5**–2	Alex Spellman 82.72
**Luke Humphries** 102.62	**5**–3	Nathan Aspinall 100.01

==== Group B ====
Pos.	Player	P	W	L	LF	LA	+/−	Pts	Status
1	**Chris Dobey (8)**	3	3	0	15	3	+12	**6**	**Q**
2	**Jurjen van der Velde**	3	2	1	11	12	–1	**4**	**Q**
3	Damon Heta	3	1	2	9	11	–2	**2**	**Eliminated**
4	Martin Lukeman	3	0	3	6	15	–9	**0**	**Eliminated**

8 November

**Damon Heta** 89.46	**5**–1	Martin Lukeman 83.04
**Chris Dobey** 95.35	**5**–1	Jurjen van der Velde 89.62

9 November

Martin Lukeman 79.90	4–**5**	**Jurjen van der Velde** 83.83
**Chris Dobey** 95.17	**5**–1	Damon Heta 83.26

10 November

**Chris Dobey** 81.79	**5**–1	Martin Lukeman 72.67
Damon Heta 94.09	3–**5**	**Jurjen van der Velde** 87.10

==== Group C ====
Pos.	Player	P	W	L	LF	LA	+/−	Pts	Status
1	**Luke Woodhouse**	3	3	0	15	8	+7	**6**	**Q**
2	**Martin Schindler**	3	2	1	12	11	+1	**4**	**Q**
3	Alexis Toylo	3	1	2	9	14	–5	**2**	**Eliminated**
4	Stephen Bunting (4)	3	0	3	12	15	–3	**0**	**Eliminated**

8 November

Martin Schindler 91.85	2–**5**	**Luke Woodhouse** 96.70
Stephen Bunting 89.58	4–**5**	**Alexis Toylo** 81.44

9 November

Stephen Bunting 97.43	4–**5**	**Martin Schindler** 100.78
**Luke Woodhouse** 103.61	**5**–2	Alexis Toylo 89.32

10 November

Stephen Bunting 95.40	4–**5**	**Luke Woodhouse** 92.29
**Martin Schindler** 96.69	**5**–2	Alexis Toylo 83.67

==== Group D ====
Pos.	Player	P	W	L	LF	LA	+/−	Pts	Status
1	**Gerwyn Price**	3	2	1	14	6	+8	**4**	**Q**
2	**Ricky Evans**	3	2	1	12	13	–1	**4**	**Q**
3	James Wade (5)	3	1	2	9	12	–3	**2**	**Eliminated**
4	Stefan Bellmont	3	1	2	10	14	–4	**2**	**Eliminated**

8 November

Gerwyn Price 95.50	4–**5**	**Ricky Evans** 95.73
James Wade 97.12	4–**5**	**Stefan Bellmont** 92.86

9 November

James Wade 87.87	0–**5**	**Gerwyn Price** 100.20
**Ricky Evans** 95.91	**5**–4	Stefan Bellmont 87.78

10 November

**James Wade** 93.82	**5**–2	Ricky Evans 92.69
**Gerwyn Price** 98.70	**5**–1	Stefan Bellmont 83.49

==== Group E ====
Pos.	Player	P	W	L	LF	LA	+/−	Pts	Status
1	**Luke Littler (2)**	3	3	0	15	5	+10	**6**	**Q**
2	**Connor Scutt**	3	2	1	13	12	+1	**4**	**Q**
3	Karel Sedláček	3	1	2	9	13	–4	**2**	**Eliminated**
4	Daryl Gurney	3	0	3	8	15	–7	**0**	**Eliminated**

8 November

Daryl Gurney 93.80	4–**5**	**Connor Scutt** 91.46
**Luke Littler** 98.64	**5**–1	Karel Sedláček 84.07

9 November

Daryl Gurney 81.45	3–**5**	**Karel Sedláček** 86.57
**Luke Littler** 105.00	**5**–3	Connor Scutt 99.48

11 November

**Luke Littler** 94.60	**5**–1	Daryl Gurney 93.07
**Connor Scutt** 92.31	**5**–3	Karel Sedláček 94.45

==== Group F ====
Pos.	Player	P	W	L	LF	LA	+/−	Pts	Status
1	**Josh Rock**	3	2	1	14	7	+7	**4**	**Q**
2	**Wessel Nijman**	3	2	1	13	9	+4	**4**	**Q**
3	Gian van Veen (7)	3	2	1	12	12	0	**4**	**Eliminated**
4	Lisa Ashton	3	0	3	4	15	–11	**0**	**Eliminated**

8 November

Josh Rock 109.23	4–**5**	**Wessel Nijman** 101.39
**Gian van Veen** 94.46	**5**–4	Lisa Ashton 81.54

9 November

**Josh Rock** 98.88	**5**–0	Lisa Ashton 87.38
**Gian van Veen** 107.27	**5**–3	Wessel Nijman 94.08

11 November

**Wessel Nijman** 96.35	**5**–0	Lisa Ashton 86.92
Gian van Veen 98.52	2–**5**	**Josh Rock** 97.01

==== Group G ====
Pos.	Player	P	W	L	LF	LA	+/−	Pts	Status
1	**Michael van Gerwen (3)**	3	2	1	14	11	+3	**4**	**Q**
2	**Niko Springer**	3	2	1	13	12	+1	**4**	**Q**
3	Beau Greaves	3	1	2	13	13	0	**2**	**Eliminated**
4	Gary Anderson	3	1	2	10	14	–4	**2**	**Eliminated**

8 November

Gary Anderson 99.88	3–**5**	**Niko Springer** 93.63
**Michael van Gerwen** 96.80	**5**–4	Beau Greaves 101.47

9 November

**Gary Anderson** 103.08	**5**–4	Beau Greaves 102.46
Michael van Gerwen 94.37	4–**5**	**Niko Springer** 86.02

11 November

Niko Springer 87.62	3–**5**	**Beau Greaves** 87.29
**Michael van Gerwen** 108.45	**5**–2	Gary Anderson 99.39

==== Group H ====
Pos.	Player	P	W	L	LF	LA	+/−	Pts	Status
1	**Lukas Wenig**	3	2	1	14	9	+5	**4**	**Q**
2	**Danny Noppert**	3	2	1	14	13	+1	**4**	**Q**
3	Cam Crabtree	3	1	2	10	11	–1	**2**	**Eliminated**
4	Jonny Clayton (6)	3	1	2	9	14	–5	**2**	**Eliminated**

8 November

**Danny Noppert** 86.77	**5**–4	Lukas Wenig 88.91
Jonny Clayton 93.36	1–**5**	**Cam Crabtree** 102.07

9 November

Jonny Clayton 94.14	3–**5**	**Lukas Wenig** 93.98
**Danny Noppert** 100.38	**5**–4	Cam Crabtree 95.48

11 November

**Jonny Clayton** 98.66	**5**–4	Danny Noppert 107.00
**Lukas Wenig** 88.69	**5**–1	Cam Crabtree 84.18

=== Knockout stage ===
**Second round** (best of 19 legs); 12–13 November
**A1**	**Luke Humphries (1) 108.55**	**10**
B2	Jurjen van der Velde 97.25	3
B1	Chris Dobey (8) 93.34	9
**A2**	**Michael Smith 88.30**	**10**
C1	Luke Woodhouse 91.84	9
**D2**	**Ricky Evans 93.52**	**10**
**D1**	**Gerwyn Price 96.71**	**10**
C2	Martin Schindler 90.25	6
**E1**	**Luke Littler (2) 105.38**	**10**
F2	Wessel Nijman 94.94	4
**F1**	**Josh Rock 89.73**	**10**
E2	Connor Scutt 91.65	9
G1	Michael van Gerwen (3) 96.50	6
**H2**	**Danny Noppert 98.34**	**10**
**H1**	**Lukas Wenig 93.20**	**10**
G2	Niko Springer 93.31	8

**Quarter-finals** (best of 31 legs); 14–15 November
**A1**	**Luke Humphries (1) 104.98**	**16**
A2	Michael Smith 93.05	8
D2	Ricky Evans 93.85	9
**D1**	**Gerwyn Price 99.42**	**16**
**E1**	**Luke Littler (2) 105.18**	**16**
F1	Josh Rock 101.46	12
**H2**	**Danny Noppert 97.61**	**16**
H1	Lukas Wenig 92.86	8

**Semi-finals** (best of 31 legs); 16 November
**A1**	**Luke Humphries (1) 106.25**	**16**
D1	Gerwyn Price 98.74	13
**E1**	**Luke Littler (2) 102.62**	**16**
H2	Danny Noppert 100.30	9

**Final** (best of 31 legs); 16 November
A1	Luke Humphries (1) 99.56	11
**E1**	**Luke Littler (2) 100.61**	**16**

== Top averages ==
The table lists all players who achieved an average of at least 100 in a match. If any player has multiple records, this is indicated by the number in brackets.

#	Player	Round	Average	Result
1	Josh Rock	Group Stage	109.23	Lost
2	Luke Humphries	Second Round	108.55	Won
3	Michael van Gerwen	Group Stage	108.45	Won
4	Gian van Veen	Group Stage	107.27	Won
5	Danny Noppert	Group Stage	107.00	Lost
6	Luke Humphries (2)	Semi-finals	106.25	Won
7	Luke Littler	Second Round	105.38	Won
8	Luke Littler (2)	Quarter-finals	105.18	Won
9	Luke Littler (3)	Group Stage	105.00	Won
10	Luke Humphries (3)	Quarter-finals	104.98	Won
11	Luke Woodhouse	Group Stage	103.61	Won
12	Gary Anderson	Group Stage	103.08	Won
13	Luke Humphries (4)	Group Stage	102.62	Won
13	Luke Littler (4)	Semi-finals	102.62	Won
15	Beau Greaves	Group Stage	102.46	Lost
16	Cam Crabtree	Group Stage	102.07	Won
17	Beau Greaves (2)	Group Stage	101.47	Lost
18	Josh Rock (2)	Quarter-finals	101.46	Lost
19	Wessel Nijman	Group Stage	101.39	Won
20	Martin Schindler	Group Stage	100.78	Won
21	Luke Littler (5)	Final	100.61	Won
22	Danny Noppert (2)	Group Stage	100.38	Won
23	Danny Noppert (3)	Semi-finals	100.30	Lost
24	Gerwyn Price	Group Stage	100.20	Won
25	Nathan Aspinall	Group Stage	100.01	Lost
