= Gudger =

Gudger is a surname. Notable people with the surname include:

- Eleanor Gudger, English poker player
- Garlan Gudger (born 1975), American politician
- James M. Gudger Jr. (1855–1920), American politician
- V. Lamar Gudger (1919–2004), American politician
