= 2025 World Series of Darts Finals =

Darts tournament

2025 Jack's Casino World Series of Darts Finals

Tournament information
- Dates: 12–14 September 2025
- Venue: AFAS Live
- Location: Amsterdam, Netherlands
- Organisation(s): Professional Darts Corporation (PDC)
- Format: Legs
- Prize fund: £400,000
- Winner's share: £80,000
- High checkout: 170 Chris Dobey

Champion(s)
- Michael van Gerwen (NED)

The 2025 World Series of Darts Finals (known for sponsorship reasons as the 2025 Jack's Casino World Series of Darts Finals) was a professional darts tournament that was held at the AFAS Live in Amsterdam, Netherlands, from 12 to 14 September 2025. It was the 11th staging of the World Series of Darts Finals by the Professional Darts Corporation (PDC). The total prize fund was £400,000, with the winner receiving £80,000.

The tournament served as the culmination to the 2025 World Series of Darts, a collection of seven unranked events held by the PDC in seven different countries. It featured 32 players, comprising qualifiers from the World Series Order of Merit and the top four players from the PDC Order of Merit who had not already qualified, as well as six Tour Card holder qualifiers.

Luke Littler was the defending champion, having defeated Michael Smith 11–4 in the 2024 final. Michael van Gerwen won the tournament and the sixth World Series Finals title of his career by defeating Littler 11–7 in the final.

== Overview ==
=== Background ===
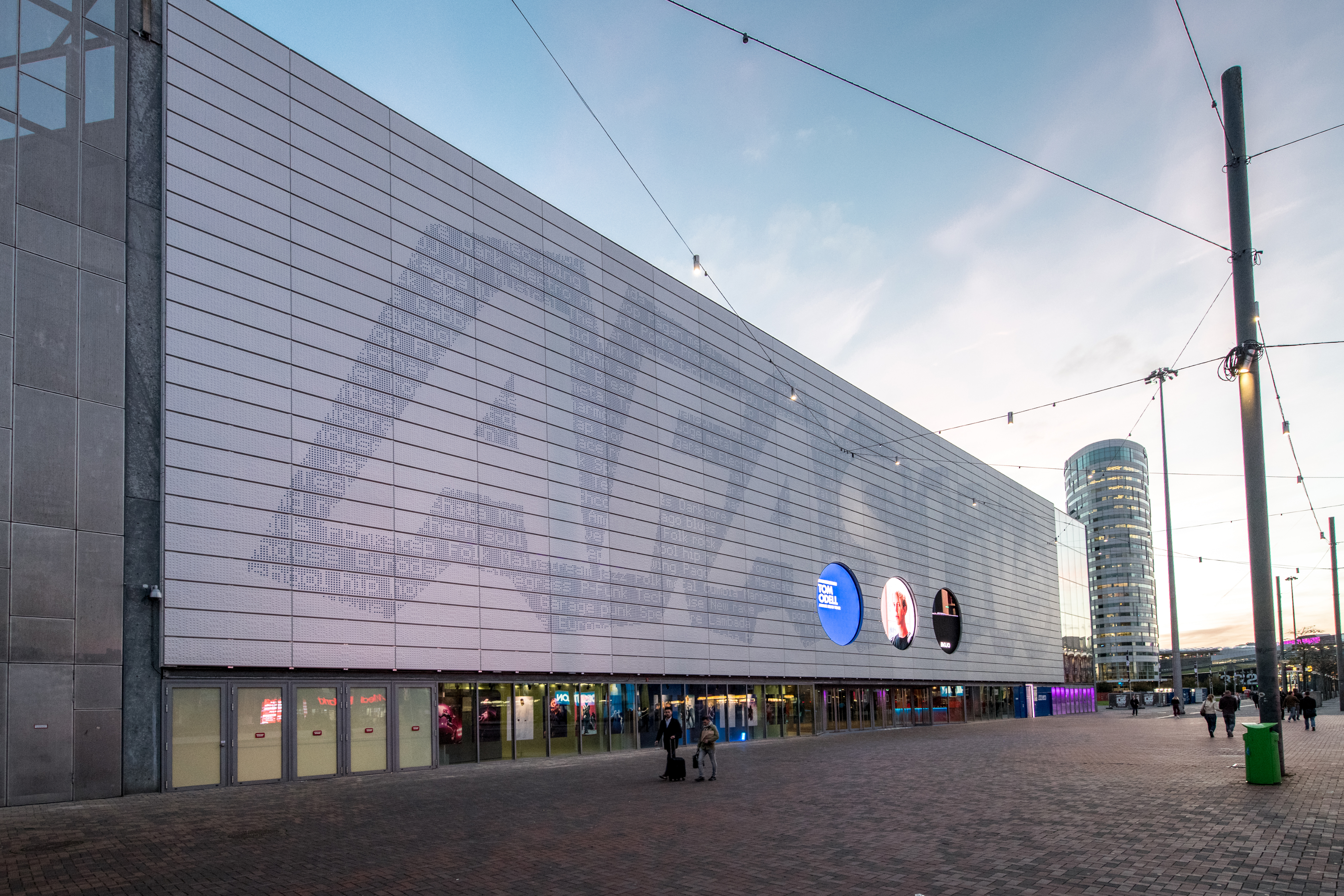
The tournament was held at the AFAS Live (pictured in 2017) in Amsterdam, Netherlands.

The 2025 World Series of Darts Finals was the 11th edition of the tournament to be staged by the Professional Darts Corporation (PDC) since the 2015 event. The World Series of Darts was launched by the PDC in 2013 with the aim of growing the popularity of darts around the world. The inaugural year of the tour consisted of two events, the Dubai Masters and the Sydney Masters, which were won by Michael van Gerwen and Phil Taylor respectively. The format of World Series events pits invited PDC representatives against regional qualifiers in the opening round. As the tour expanded, the World Series of Darts Finals was introduced in 2015, where the top eight players on the World Series rankings and additional international qualifiers would compete to close out the year. The first edition of the tournament was won by Michael van Gerwen. In 2024, the World Series of Darts Finals expanded from 24 to 32 players.

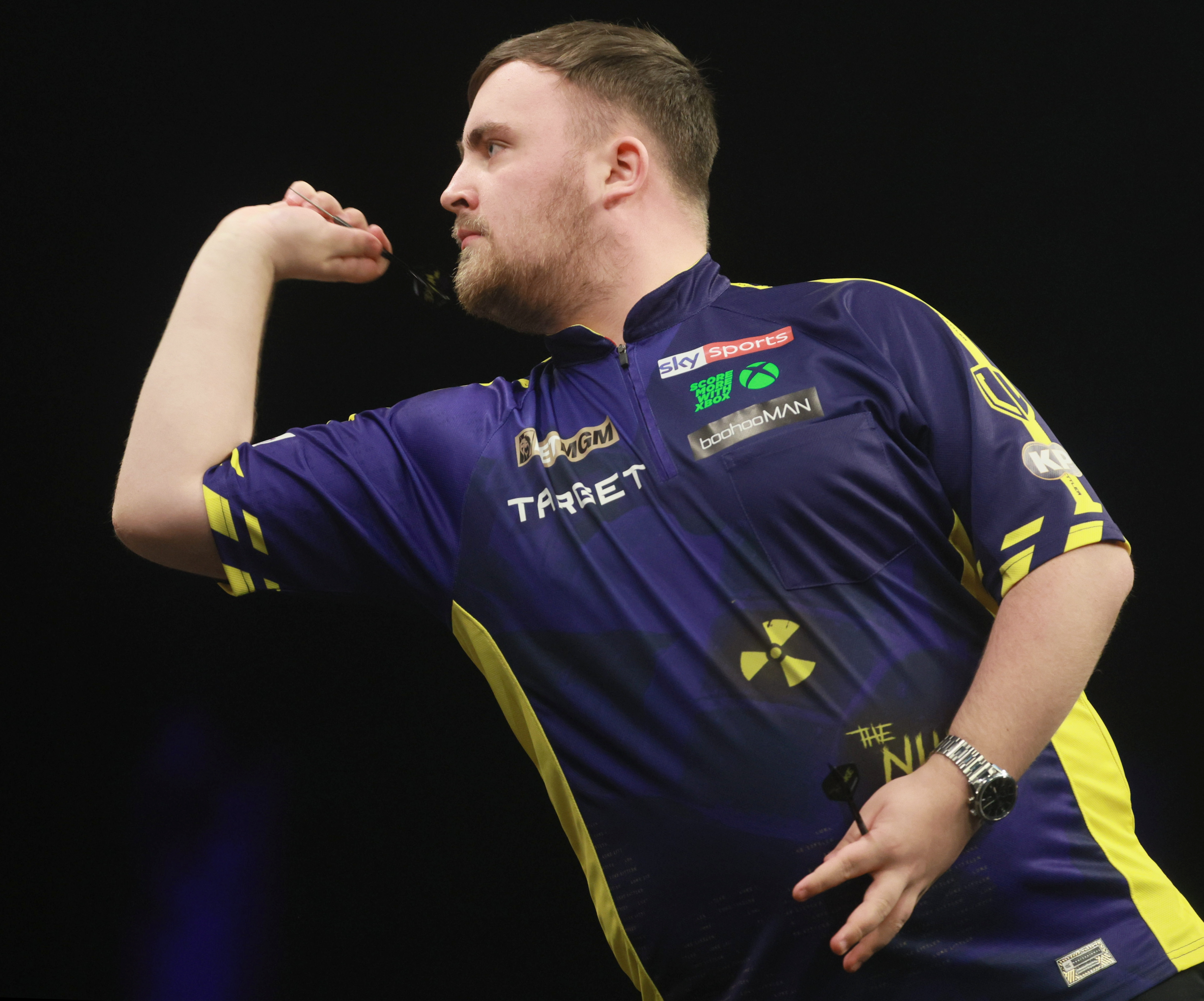
Luke Littler (pictured) was the defending champion going into the tournament.

The 2025 edition took place from 12 to 14 September 2025 at the AFAS Live in Amsterdam, Netherlands. Dutch casino brand Jack's Casino continued its sponsorship of the event, having first acted as title sponsor for the 2019 edition. Reigning world champion Luke Littler entered the tournament as defending champion after winning the title for the first time by defeating Michael Smith 11–4 in the 2024 final. Littler, Luke Humphries, two-time champion Gerwyn Price and Josh Rock were considered favourites to win the tournament.

=== Format ===
The top eight players on the 2025 World Series of Darts Order of Merit were seeded in the first round, while the other 24 players were drawn into the bracket at random. All matches were in leg play format, with the number of legs required to win increasing as the tournament progressed:

- First and second round: Best of 11 legs
- Quarter-finals: Best of 19 legs
- Semi-finals and final: Best of 21 legs

=== Prize money ===
The prize fund remained at £400,000 after increasing the previous year. The winner received £80,000.

Position (no. of players)		Prize money (Total: £400,000)
Winner	(1)	£80,000
Runner-up	(1)	£40,000
Semi-finalists	(2)	£25,000
Quarter-finalists	(4)	£17,500
Last 16 (second round)	(8)	£10,000
Last 32 (first round)	(16)	£5,000

=== Broadcasts ===
The tournament was broadcast on ITV4 in the United Kingdom. Other broadcasters included Viaplay in the Netherlands, Iceland, Scandinavia and the Baltic states; DAZN in Germany, Austria and Switzerland; FanDuel in the United States and Canada; Fox Sports in Australia; Sky Sport in New Zealand; VTM in Belgium; Nova in Czechia and Slovakia; Pragosport in Hungary and Zonasport in Croatia. It was also available on the PDC's streaming service, PDCTV, to international subscribers.

== Qualification ==
The 2025 World Series of Darts consisted of seven events:

- 2025 Bahrain Darts Masters
- 2025 Dutch Darts Masters
- 2025 Nordic Darts Masters
- 2025 US Darts Masters
- 2025 Poland Darts Masters
- 2025 Australian Darts Masters
- 2025 New Zealand Darts Masters

The top eight players on the 2025 World Series Order of Merit – a ranking of players based on points earned across the seven events – qualified for the tournament as seeds, and were joined by additional qualifiers from the World Series Order of Merit and the top four players on the PDC Order of Merit who had not already qualified. Gary Anderson and Paolo Nebrida declined their invitation. The remaining places went to six PDC Tour Card holders from a qualifying event held in Milton Keynes on 27 August.

Seeded players
1. Stephen Bunting (ENG) (first round)
2. Luke Littler (ENG) (runner-up)
3. Gerwyn Price (WAL) (semi-finals)
4. Luke Humphries (ENG) (quarter-finals)
5. Rob Cross (ENG) (second round)
6. Chris Dobey (ENG) (quarter-finals)
7. Nathan Aspinall (ENG) (first round)
8. Mike De Decker (BEL) (quarter-finals)

World Series Order of Merit qualifiers
- Damon Heta (AUS) (second round)
- Michael van Gerwen (NED) (champion)
- Josh Rock (NIR) (semi-finals)
- Peter Wright (SCO) (first round)
- Jonny Clayton (WAL) (second round)
- Raymond van Barneveld (NED) (second round)
- Kevin Doets (NED) (second round)
- Jermaine Wattimena (NED) (first round)
- Danny Lauby (USA) (first round)
- Jason Brandon (USA) (first round)
- Krzysztof Ratajski (POL) (first round)
- Haupai Puha (NZL) (first round)
- Simon Whitlock (AUS) (first round)
- Jonny Tata (NZL) (first round)

PDC Order of Merit qualifiers
- James Wade (ENG) (first round)
- Dave Chisnall (ENG) (second round)
- Ross Smith (ENG) (quarter-finals)
- Danny Noppert (NED) (second round)

Tour Card Holder qualifiers
- Gabriel Clemens (GER) (first round)
- Cameron Menzies (SCO) (second round)
- Wessel Nijman (NED) (first round)
- Luke Woodhouse (ENG) (first round)
- Joe Cullen (ENG) (first round)
- Cor Dekker (NOR) (first round)

== Summary ==
=== First round ===
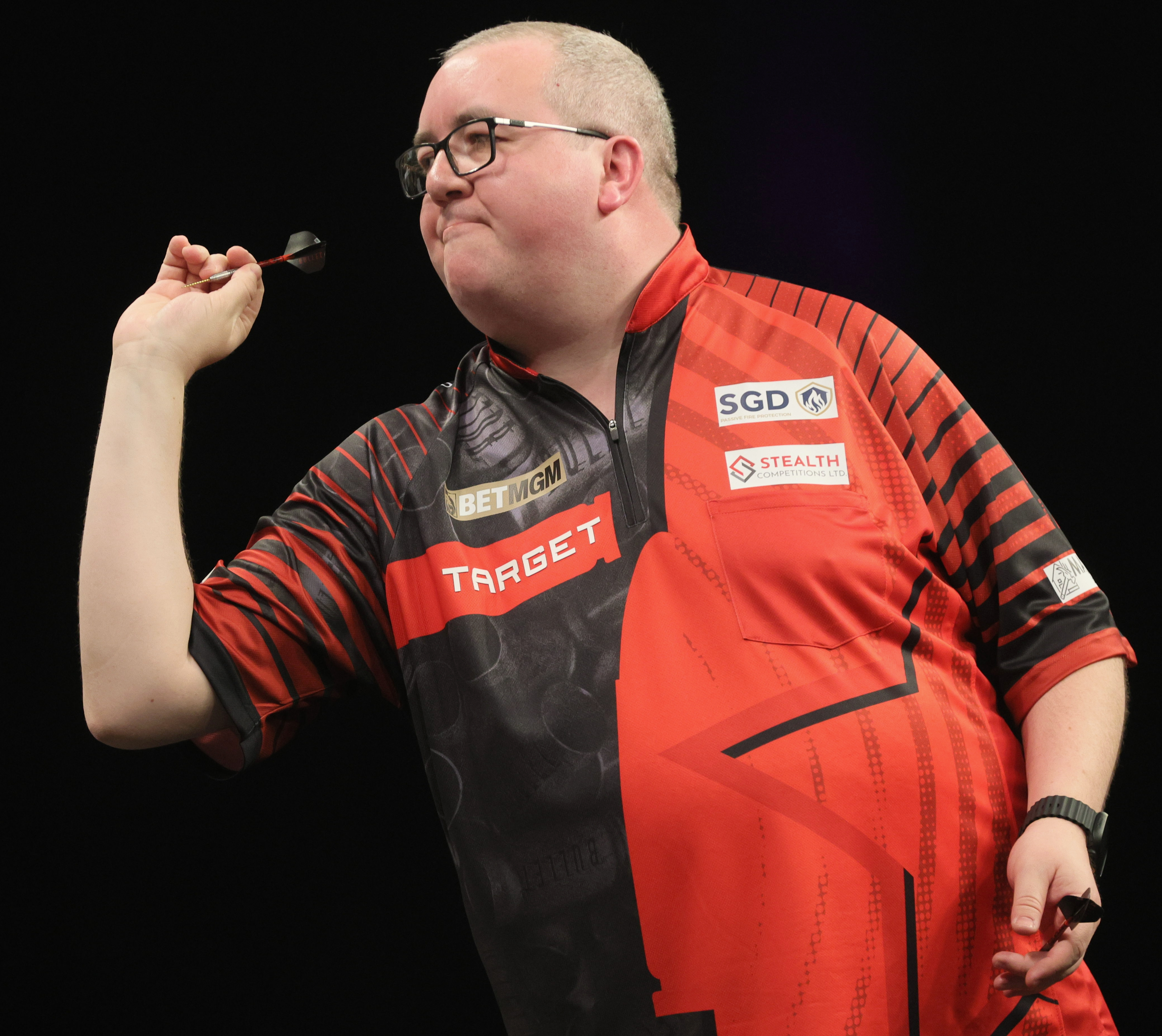
Top seed Stephen Bunting (pictured) was eliminated in the first round by Danny Noppert.

The first round was played on 12 September and in the afternoon session of 13 September. Top seed Stephen Bunting was eliminated in his opening match, suffering a 6–4 defeat to Danny Noppert. Wessel Nijman led his match against three-time world champion Michael van Gerwen 2–0, 3–1 and 5–4 but was unable to win despite having a match dart. Van Gerwen hit double 18 to prevail in a deciding leg. He claimed the win was "one of [his] best performances in Holland for a long time". World number one Luke Humphries was also brought to a decider by James Wade, who missed a dart at double 8 for the match to allow Humphries to win 6–5. Kevin Doets opened the tournament with a 6–5 victory over compatriot Jermaine Wattimena, surviving four missed match darts in the process. Gabriel Clemens missed double 12 for a nine-dart finish during his 6–3 loss to Mike De Decker. Josh Rock, Damon Heta and Rob Cross progressed to the next round with wins against Krzysztof Ratajski, Joe Cullen and Haupai Puha respectively.

Defending champion and reigning world champion Luke Littler began his campaign by defeating Simon Whitlock 6–4, while five-time world champion Raymond van Barneveld overturned a 5–3 deficit and survived six missed match darts from Cor Dekker to win 6–5. American qualifiers Danny Lauby and Jason Brandon were beaten by Gerwyn Price and Jonny Clayton respectively. Chris Dobey, Cameron Menzies, Ross Smith and Dave Chisnall were also victorious.

=== Second round ===
The second round was played in the evening session of 13 September. Jonny Clayton took a 3–0 lead against Luke Littler but the defending champion proceeded to claim the next five legs, ultimately winning 6–4. "It was not easy and I can pull myself out of situations, I know I can do it," commented Littler after the match. Van Gerwen advanced to the quarter-finals through another deciding leg victory against Rob Cross, securing victory with a 111 checkout. Josh Rock produced a whitewash victory against Danny Noppert in nine minutes, while Mike De Decker defeated Damon Heta 6–4 and Ross Smith beat Dave Chisnall by the same scoreline. Cameron Menzies registered a three-dart average of 66.85, the lowest in the history of the World Series Finals, in his 6–1 loss to Chris Dobey. Former world champions Luke Humphries and Gerwyn Price progressed by defeating their Dutch counterparts Kevin Doets and Raymond van Barneveld.

=== Quarter-finals, semi-finals and final ===
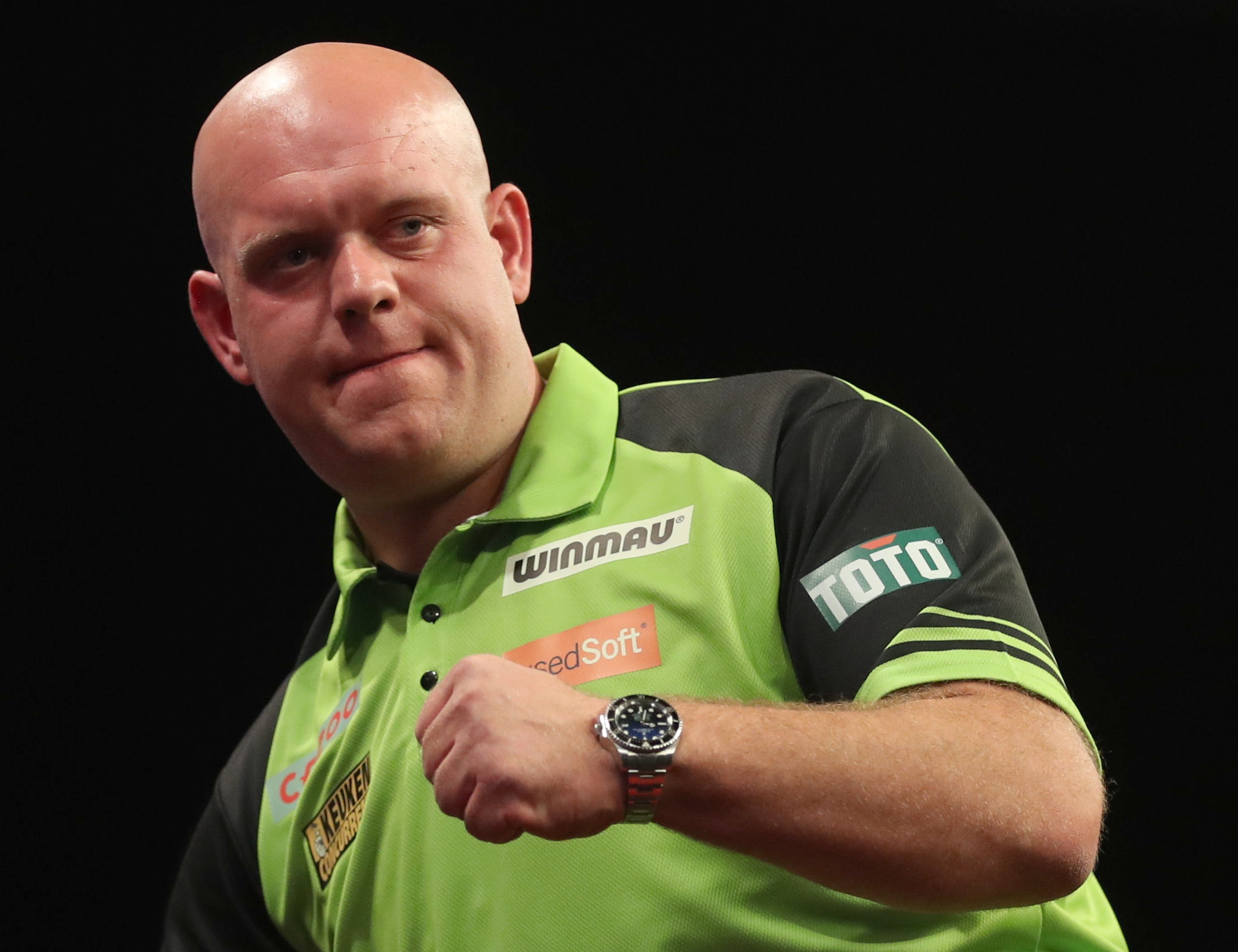
Michael van Gerwen (pictured in 2022) won his sixth World Series of Darts Finals title.

The quarter-finals, semi-finals and final were played on 14 September. Michael van Gerwen continued his run on home soil by knocking out Luke Humphries, averaging 106.45 in a 10–5 victory over the world number one. Luke Littler beat Ross Smith 10–8 in a high-level match, with Littler defying a 106 average from Smith to advance to the semi-finals. Gerwyn Price defeated Chris Dobey by the same scoreline, while Josh Rock won 10–6 against Mike De Decker to complete the final four.

In the semi-finals, Rock faced Van Gerwen and Littler faced Price. Van Gerwen progressed to the final after defeating Josh Rock 11–6 as he looked the win the World Series Finals for a sixth time. In the other match, Price went two legs away from victory with a 9–5 lead over Littler, but the reigning world champion won the next five to go 10–9 ahead. Price was able to take the semi-final to a decider, but Littler sealed the win on double 5 after hitting back-to-back maximums (180s) earlier in the leg.

Van Gerwen led the final 3–2 in the early stages, hitting three maximums in the opening five legs. Littler levelled the match with a 10-dart leg after the first interval but Van Gerwen took command again by winning the next three, although he missed the opportunity to take a four-leg lead as Littler brought it back to 6–4. Littler missed darts to make it 7–7 as the Dutch crowd appeared to put him off, allowing Van Gerwen to stay ahead and eventually go 9–6 up. The pair exchanged holds of throw before Van Gerwen won the match 11–7, securing the final leg with a 130 checkout. Van Gerwen ended the match with a three-dart average of 98.37. The victory marked the Dutchman's first major title since winning the same tournament in 2023. (Note: Also reported as his first televised title in two years, despite winning the Dutch Darts Masters televised on ITV4 in January 2024) He also won a record-extending sixth World Series Finals. Van Gerwen celebrated on stage with his daughter and discussed his recent struggles, before adding, "To do this in front of your home crowd it means a lot to me." Littler welcomed his opponent's resurgence, saying, "If he keeps playing like that, there are going to be some good battles."

== Draw ==
The draw was announced on 1 September. Numbers to the left of a player's name show the seedings for the top 8 in the tournament. The figures to the right of a player's name state their three-dart average in a match. Players in bold denote match winners.

**First round** (best of 11 legs); 12–13 September
1	Stephen Bunting 94.31	4
**Danny Noppert 92.59**	**6**
Krzysztof Ratajski 95.71	3
**Josh Rock 96.50**	**6**
**8**	**Mike De Decker 89.15**	**6**
Gabriel Clemens 92.20	3
**Damon Heta 96.06**	**6**
Joe Cullen 80.79	1
**4**	**Luke Humphries 99.21**	**6**
James Wade 92.89	5
**Kevin Doets 85.11**	**6**
Jermaine Wattimena 86.83	5
**5**	**Rob Cross 98.14**	**6**
Haupai Puha 98.93	3
Wessel Nijman 101.45	5
**Michael van Gerwen 104.75**	**6**
**2**	**Luke Littler 94.17**	**6**
Simon Whitlock 88.62	4
**Jonny Clayton 101.33**	**6**
Jason Brandon 82.03	0
7	Nathan Aspinall 87.82	2
**Dave Chisnall 92.05**	**6**
Jonny Tata 86.54	4
**Ross Smith 93.79**	**6**
**3**	**Gerwyn Price 94.68**	**6**
Danny Lauby 82.43	1
Cor Dekker 86.91	5
**Raymond van Barneveld 91.76**	**6**
**6**	**Chris Dobey 94.60**	**6**
Luke Woodhouse 88.44	2
**Cameron Menzies 95.36**	**6**
Peter Wright 98.59	3

**Second round** (best of 11 legs); 13 September
Danny Noppert 100.19	0
**Josh Rock 107.36**	**6**
**8**	**Mike De Decker 98.68**	**6**
Damon Heta 93.87	4
**4**	**Luke Humphries 101.87**	**6**
Kevin Doets 91.16	4
5	Rob Cross 96.45	5
**Michael van Gerwen 98.74**	**6**
**2**	**Luke Littler 96.61**	**6**
Jonny Clayton 98.81	4
Dave Chisnall 94.27	4
**Ross Smith 99.29**	**6**
**3**	**Gerwyn Price 102.97**	**6**
Raymond van Barneveld 100.73	4
**6**	**Chris Dobey 82.15**	**6**
Cameron Menzies 66.85	1

**Quarter-finals** (best of 19 legs); 14 September
**Josh Rock 95.44**	**10**
8	Mike De Decker 92.75	6
4	Luke Humphries 97.73	5
**Michael van Gerwen 106.45**	**10**
**2**	**Luke Littler 107.31**	**10**
Ross Smith 106.12	8
**3**	**Gerwyn Price 100.29**	**10**
6	Chris Dobey 99.25	8

**Semi-finals** (best of 21 legs); 14 September
Josh Rock 99.59	6
**Michael van Gerwen 102.09**	**11**
**2**	**Luke Littler 100.08**	**11**
3	Gerwyn Price 99.53	10

**Final** (best of 21 legs); 14 September
**Michael van Gerwen 98.37**	**11**
2	Luke Littler 101.99	7
