= Bragster =

Social networking website

- Company type: Subsidiary
- Website type: Video hosting service and social network service
- Founded: July 2006
- Headquarters: London, {{{location_country}}}
- Area served: Worldwide
- Owners: Wannabet Ltd (2006–2010); Guinness World Records (2010)
- Creators: Wim Vernaeve; Bertrand Bodson
- Website: www.bragster.com
- Registration: Optional (required to upload and comment on videos)
- Current status: Closed August 2010

Bragster was a global social networking and video sharing website on which users dare each other to perform stunts and tasks. The website name stems from the 'Bragging Rights' which are earned on the site. The company is based in London, England. The majority of the content is user generated, although some branded videos from companies such as Tango, Adidas and Wizards of the Coast have been broadcast on the site. The site is designed to be a more niche alternative to other social networking websites. In February 2010 Bragster was acquired by Guinness World Records.

== Company history ==
Bragster was founded in 2006 as Gottabet.com by Wim Vernaeve and Bertrand Bodson. The site was started as a way to bring gambling and social networking together, but over time the gambling and betting aspect was dropped in favour of bragging and dares. The logo was changed to a blue gorilla to reflect this new "edgier" direction.

Originally, the site was geared more towards social networking with features such as blogs, but these were removed as part of the re-branding, with the focus shifted purely to daring and bragging. The change was made in order for advertisers to integrate their content into the main body of the site, via sponsored dares and challenges. In February 2008, Bragster received a $3.5 million Series A investment from Intel Capital and private investor David Frankle.

In February 2010, Bragster was acquired by Guinness World Records in an effort to expand GWR's digital presence. Initially the two brands will be kept separate, with plans to integrate Bragster into the GWR website in the second half of 2010.

On 31 August 2010, Bragster was taken offline.

== Branded campaigns ==
In March 2009, Bragster formed a long-term partnership with Britvic to promote their fizzy orange soft drink Tango. The campaign was launched by Bragster daring Tango bosses to print 2.5 million Tango cans upside down, with the Bragster logo on the top. A mock-up image of the new can was released on the website on April Fools' Day, before 2.5 million the cans went into production a few weeks later. To further promote the launch of the upside down cans, Bragster and Tango orchestrated a publicity stunt wherein a number of models in orange bikinis stood on their heads in various places around London, including St Paul's, the Tate Modern and on the tube. After the initial launch the partnership continued with ten branded dares, such as dying your hair orange and covering yourself in Tango, being issued throughout the remainder of 2009. The dares can be viewed and entered on the Tango mini-site.

Also in March 2009, Bragster started a deal with Lionsgate UK to promote the film Crank: High Voltage. Two themed dares were put up on the Crank 2 Group. The first was to have a public freakout, and the second was to have your name legally changed to Chev Chelios, the anti-hero of the film. On 24 March, David Robert Smart officially changed his name by deed poll to claim a $1000 prize offered by the site.

To promote their new F50i football boots, Adidas and Bragster launched the Adidas F50i Challenge, featuring seven different football orientated dares. Footballers Jermain Defoe and Ashley Young captained two opposing user teams. The challenge received 168 unique video entries.

Wizards of the Coast used Bragster to launch a new Magic: The Gathering Core Set, Magic 2010. The grand prize for the best Brag uploaded was a trip to the Magic World Championship tournament in Rome for two, won by dragonangyle, with a host of smaller prizes for other entries. Wizards of the Coast also used Bragster to exclusively preview a reprinted card, Dragon Whelp.

Other brands who have worked with Bragster include Warner Bros. for the UK theatrical release of action film Ninja Assassin, Nissan's sports range, MTV for the launch of rebranded channel Viva in Europe, online poker site PKR.com and 20th Century Fox for the UK DVD release of action film 12 Rounds

== Publicity stunts ==
In August 2009, Bragster co-founder Bertrand Bodson appeared on TV show The X-Factor dressed as a blue gorilla, after being dared to by the rest of the Bragster team. The team agreed to donate £1,000 to the charity of Bodson's choice on successful completion of the dare. The money was donated to the Gorilla Organisation.

Acting on a dare by Bragster user 'whoareyou' to Bring the Bubbles, 'mr_bubble' filled the fountains at Trafalgar Square with washing up liquid, causing the fountains to fill up with foam. The stunt was covered by multiple national papers.

Before Christmas 2008, Bragster projected an image of a working credit card in central London, with £10,000 in credit. The 10 ft image was projected on the side of the Bank of England and a corner of Kensington High Street. Londoners who found the card were invited to spend the money on whatever they wanted.

FHM's projection of a naked picture of Gail Porter on the side of the Houses of Parliament in 1999 was subverted by Bragster ten years after the original stunt by projecting a nude man on the side of the Tate Britain.

In June 2009, Bragster offered £200 for the first person to hit British National Party (BNP) leader Nick Griffin with ethnic food, as a reaction to the political leader getting pelted with eggs by political opponents. No one has claimed the prize yet.

Most recently, in December 2009 Bragster repeated their "Christmas Cash Giveaway", throwing thousands of pounds worth of five-pound notes mixed with fake Bragster-branded notes out of a shop window on London's Carnaby St.
