= 2025 Poland Darts Masters =

Darts tournament in Poland

2025 Superbet Poland Darts Masters

Tournament information
- Dates: 4–5 July 2025
- Venue: PreZero Arena
- Location: Gliwice
- Country: Poland
- Organisation(s): PDC
- Format: Legs
- Prize fund: £100,000
- Winner's share: £30,000
- High checkout: 170; Chris Dobey; Luke Littler (x2)

Champion(s)
- Gerwyn Price

The 2025 Poland Darts Masters, known as the 2025 Superbet Poland Darts Masters for sponsorship reasons, was the third staging of the professional darts tournament by the Professional Darts Corporation, and the fifth event in the 2025 World Series of Darts. The tournament featured 16 players (eight elite PDC players and eight Eastern Europe representatives) and was held at the PreZero Arena in Gliwice, Poland between 4–5 July 2025.

Luke Littler was the defending champion after defeating Rob Cross 8–3 in the 2024 final. However, he lost 7–3 to Stephen Bunting in the semi-finals.

Gerwyn Price won the tournament and the fourth World Series title of his career after beating Bunting 8–7 in the final.

== Overview ==
=== Format ===
Eight elite PDC representatives were drawn to play eight Eastern Europe representatives in the first round on Friday 4 July; the quarter-finals, semi-finals and final all took place on Saturday 5 July. All matches were in leg play format, with the number of legs required to win increasing as the tournament progressed:

- First round and quarter-finals: Best of eleven legs
- Semi-finals: Best of thirteen legs
- Final: Best of fifteen legs

=== Prize money ===
The winner received £30,000. The total prize fund was £100,000.

Position (no. of players)		Prize money (Total: £100,000)
Winner	(1)	£30,000
Runner-up	(1)	£16,000
Semi-finalists	(2)	£10,000
Quarter-finalists	(4)	£5,000
First round	(8)	£1,750

=== Broadcasts ===
The tournament was broadcast on ITV4 in the United Kingdom and TVP Sport in Poland. Other broadcasters included DAZN in Germany, Austria and Switzerland; Viaplay in the Netherlands, Iceland, the Baltic states and Scandinavia; TV Nova in the Czech Republic and Slovakia; Fox Sports in Australia; Sky Sport in New Zealand; AMC Pragosport in Hungary; VTM in Belgium; FanDuel in the United States and Brazil; Maincast in Ukraine and Rigour in China. It is also available on PDCTV to international subscribers.

== Qualifiers ==
The PDC announced the eight players participating as their elite representatives on 15 April. World number one Luke Humphries did not participate due to family reasons.

The seedings were based on the 2025 World Series rankings after four events:

1. Stephen Bunting (runner-up)
2. Gerwyn Price (champion)
3. Rob Cross (semi-finals)
4. Nathan Aspinall (quarter-finals)
5. Luke Littler (semi-finals)
6. Chris Dobey (quarter-finals)
7. Michael van Gerwen (quarter-finals)
8. Jonny Clayton (first round)

The six Eastern European Tour Card holders automatically qualified, with the remaining two spots allocated to the winners of qualifiers in Hungary and Poland. The Hungarian qualifier was won by György Jehirszki, who defeated János Végső in the final. In the 158-player Polish qualifier, Krzysztof Kciuk beat Mirosław Grudziecki in the final to secure the last spot.

Qualification	Player
PDC Tour Card Holders	Krzysztof Ratajski (quarter-finals)
PDC Tour Card Holders	Radek Szagański (first round)
PDC Tour Card Holders	Sebastian Białecki (first round)
PDC Tour Card Holders	Tytus Kanik (first round)
PDC Tour Card Holders	Karel Sedláček (first round)
PDC Tour Card Holders	Pero Ljubić (first round)
Eastern Europe Qualifiers	György Jehirszki (first round)
Eastern Europe Qualifiers	Krzysztof Kciuk (first round)

== Summary ==
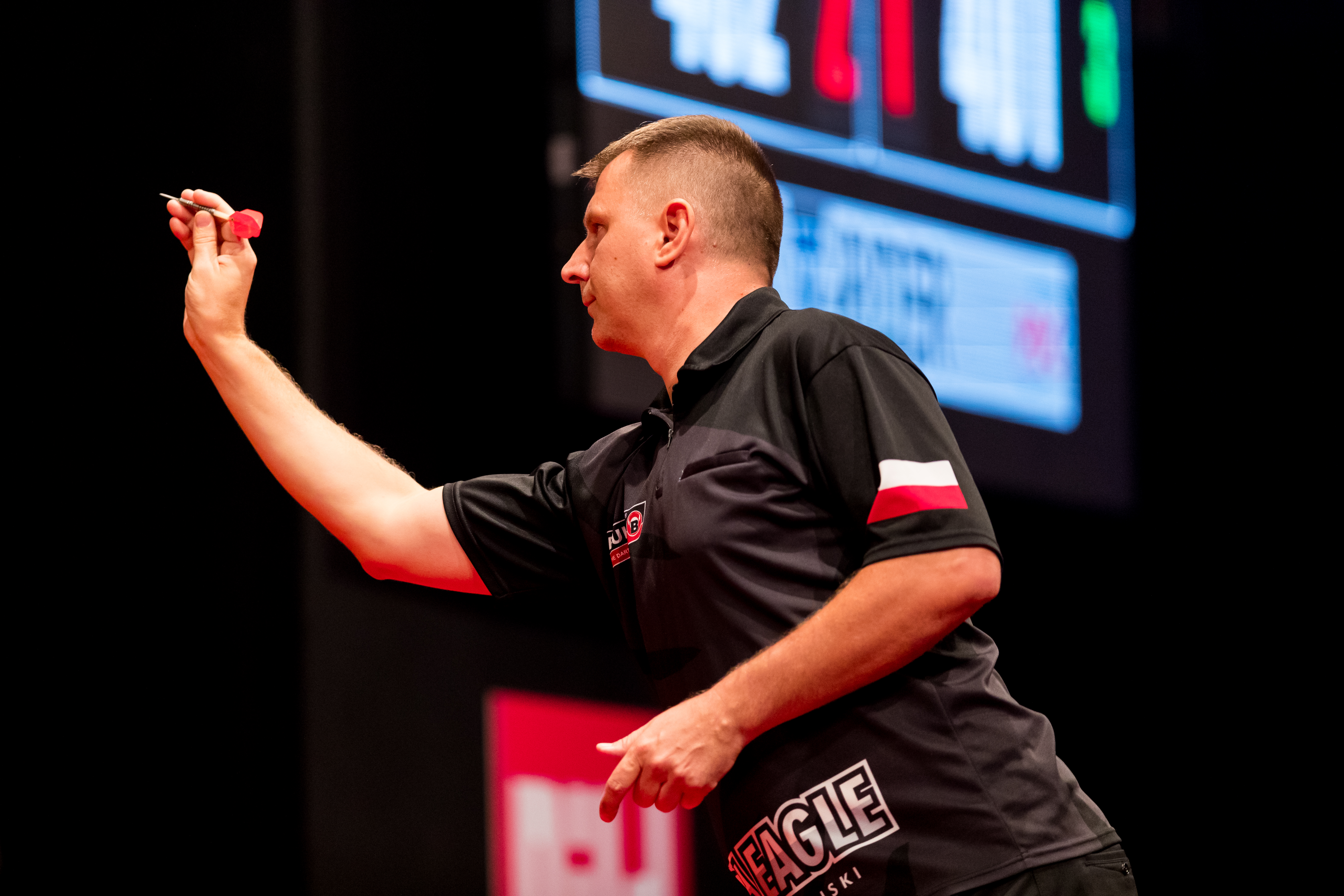
Poland's Krzysztof Ratajski defeated Jonny Clayton in the first round.

=== First round ===
Seven out of the eight elite PDC representatives won their opening match. The only Eastern Europe representative to succeed was Polish number one Krzysztof Ratajski, who defeated Jonny Clayton 6–3 in front of his home crowd. Defending champion Luke Littler battled past Karel Sedláček to win 6–4, with Littler calling Sedláček a "top player" after their match. Chris Dobey won the opening match of the session by beating Hungarian qualifier György Jehirszki 6–1, including checkouts of 170 and 167 from Dobey. Gerwyn Price and Rob Cross advanced to the second round following wins over Poland's Sebastian Białecki and Krzysztof Kciuk respectively. Michael van Gerwen was critical of his performance in his 6–4 victory over Pero Ljubić, while also branding Ljubić a "pub player". Stephen Bunting defeated Tytus Kanik 6–3, and Nathan Aspinall closed out the first round with a 6–4 win against Radek Szagański.

=== Quarter-finals, semi-finals and final ===
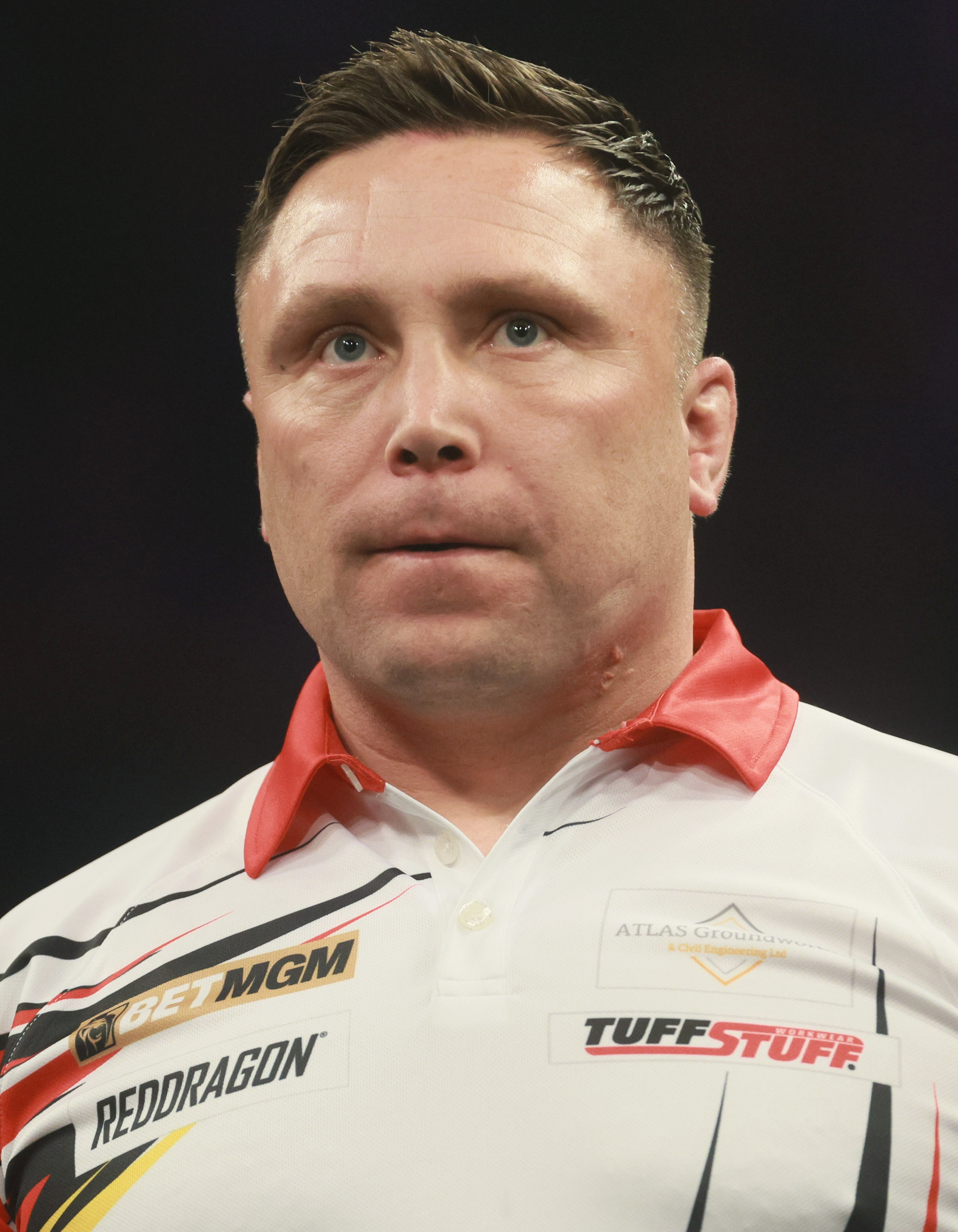
Gerwyn Price won his fourth World Series of Darts title.

As the only remaining Eastern Europe representative, Krzysztof Ratajski came within a leg away from reaching the semi-finals, but he was defeated by Stephen Bunting for the second year in a row, who won the deciding leg with a 150 checkout. After back-to-back defeats to Nathan Aspinall at the Nordic Masters and the US Masters, Luke Littler rebounded by beating Aspinall 6–3 to advance, including a 170 checkout. Gerwyn Price defeated Chris Dobey 6–2, while Rob Cross eliminated Michael van Gerwen through a 6–4 victory. In the semi-finals, Luke Littler produced another 170 checkout but ultimately lost 7–3 to Stephen Bunting. Gerwyn Price won seven of the last eight legs in his match with Rob Cross to prevail by the same scoreline, setting up a final between Bunting and Price. This marked Bunting's fourth World Series final in 2025, as he aimed to match Gary Anderson and Phil Taylor's record of winning three World Series titles in one year. Price looked to reverse the result of the Bahrain Masters final from earlier in the year, where Bunting was victorious.

In the final, Price managed to level the score early as he produced a 137 checkout to make it 2–2. However, Bunting took a 4–2 going into the interval. Price found form once the match resumed, eventually leading 7–5 in a race to eight legs. At 7–6, Bunting missed three darts at double 12 to force a deciding leg, but Price missed three match darts at double 20, allowing Bunting to hit double 3 to level the score at 7–7. In the deciding leg, Price converted a 91 checkout via a single 17 and a double-double finish (double 17 and double 20) to win his fourth World Series title in a thrilling final. Price, who arrived in Gliwice without his suitcase, averaged over 103 in the final and said that he was "over the moon" with the victory. Bunting called Price's winning double-double finish "unbelievable" and deemed it a "great ending to a brilliant game".

== Draw ==
The draw was conducted on 3 July by Polish former footballer Jerzy Dudek. Numbers to the left of players' names show the seedings for the top four in the tournament. The figures to the right of a player's name state their three-dart average in a match. Players in bold denote match winners.

**First round** (best of 11 legs); 4 July
**1**	**Stephen Bunting 87.57**	**6**
Tytus Kanik 88.82	3
Jonny Clayton 99.59	3
**Krzysztof Ratajski 100.31**	**6**
**4**	**Nathan Aspinall 87.19**	**6**
Radek Szagański 87.19	4
**Luke Littler 97.88**	**6**
Karel Sedláček 97.58	4
**2**	**Gerwyn Price 88.22**	**6**
Sebastian Białecki 85.93	3
**Chris Dobey 100.84**	**6**
György Jehirszki 94.43	1
**3**	**Rob Cross 85.36**	**6**
Krzysztof Kciuk 81.09	2
**Michael van Gerwen 84.71**	**6**
Pero Ljubić 82.69	4

**Quarter-finals** (best of 11 legs); 5 July
**1**	**Stephen Bunting 96.35**	**6**
Krzysztof Ratajski 95.16	5
4	Nathan Aspinall 99.94	3
**Luke Littler 104.88**	**6**
**2**	**Gerwyn Price 104.29**	**6**
Chris Dobey 97.42	2
**3**	**Rob Cross 88.80**	**6**
Michael van Gerwen 92.90	4

**Semi-finals** (best of 13 legs); 5 July
**1**	**Stephen Bunting 104.12**	**7**
Luke Littler 100.09	3
**2**	**Gerwyn Price 100.68**	**7**
3	Rob Cross 96.28	3

**Final** (best of 15 legs); 5 July
1	Stephen Bunting 97.95	7
**2**	**Gerwyn Price 103.12**	**8**
