= 2025 World Series of Darts =

Series of darts tournament

The 2025 World Series of Darts was a series of televised darts tournaments organised by the Professional Darts Corporation. Seven World Series events were held followed by one finals event, which like every year since 2021 took place in Amsterdam, Netherlands.

One new venue made its debut, with the Spark Arena in Auckland replacing the Globox Arena in Hamilton as the host venue for the New Zealand Masters.

== Prize money ==
The total prize fund for each of the seven World Series events increased from £60,000 the previous year to £100,000. The total prize fund for the 2025 World Series of Darts Finals was unchanged after it was increased the previous year. The prize fund breakdowns are shown below:

International events
Stage	Prize money	OoM points
Winner	£30,000	12
Runner-up	£16,000	8
Semi-finals	£10,000	5
Quarter-finals	£5,000	3
First round	£1,750	1
Total	£100,000	

Finals
Stage	Prize money
Winner	£80,000
Runner-up	£40,000
Semi-finals	£25,000
Quarter-finals	£17,500
Second round	£10,000
First round	£5,000
Total	£400,000

== World Series events ==
The 2025 World Series of Darts schedule was announced on 14 October 2024.

No.	Date	Event	Venue	Champion	Legs	Runner-up	Ref
1	16–17 January	Bahrain Masters	Sakhir, Bahrain International Circuit	Stephen Bunting	8–4	Gerwyn Price	
2	24–25 January	Dutch Masters	(Netherlands) Den Bosch, Maaspoort	Rob Cross	8–5	Stephen Bunting	
3	6–7 June	Nordic Masters	(Denmark) Copenhagen, Forum Copenhagen	Stephen Bunting	8–4	Rob Cross	
4	27–28 June	US Masters	(United States) New York City, The Theater	Luke Humphries	8–6	Nathan Aspinall	
5	4–5 July	Poland Masters	(Poland) Gliwice, PreZero Arena Gliwice	Gerwyn Price	8–7	Stephen Bunting	
6	8–9 August	Australian Masters	(Australia) Wollongong, WIN Entertainment Centre	Luke Littler	8–4	Mike De Decker	
7	15–16 August	New Zealand Masters	(New Zealand) Auckland, Spark Arena	Luke Littler	8–4	Luke Humphries	
8	12–14 September	World Series of Darts Finals	(Netherlands) Amsterdam, AFAS Live	Michael van Gerwen	11–7	Luke Littler	

== Order of Merit ==
The top eight players on the 2025 World Series Order of Merit – a ranking of players based on points earned across the seven events – qualified for the 2025 World Series of Darts Finals as seeds, and were joined by fourteen additional qualifiers from the World Series Order of Merit.

#	Player	(Bahrain) BHR	(Netherlands) NED	(Denmark) NOR	(United States) USA	(Poland) POL	(Australia) AUS	(New Zealand) NZL	Total
1	Stephen Bunting	W 12	F 8	W 12	1R; 1	F 8	SF; 5	QF; 3	49
2	Luke Littler	QF; 3	SF; 5	QF; 3	QF; 3	SF; 5	W 12	W 12	43
3	Gerwyn Price	F 8	SF; 5	SF; 5	SF; 5	W 12	QF; 3	SF; 5	43
4	Luke Humphries	SF; 5	1R; 1	QF; 3	W 12	—N/a	QF; 3	F 8	32
5	Rob Cross	1R; 1	W 12	F 8	1R; 1	SF; 5	—N/a	—N/a	27
6	Chris Dobey	QF; 3	1R; 1	QF; 3	—N/a	QF; 3	SF; 5	SF; 5	20
7	Nathan Aspinall	QF; 3	1R; 1	SF; 5	F 8	QF; 3	—N/a	—N/a	20
8	Mike De Decker	—N/a	—N/a	—N/a	—N/a	—N/a	F 8	QF; 3	11
9	Damon Heta	—N/a	—N/a	—N/a	SF; 5	—N/a	QF; 3	QF; 3	11
10	Michael van Gerwen	—N/a	QF; 3	—N/a	QF; 3	QF; 3	—N/a	—N/a	9
11	Josh Rock	—N/a	—N/a	—N/a	—N/a	—N/a	QF; 3	QF; 3	6
12	Peter Wright	SF; 5	—N/a	—N/a	—N/a	—N/a	—N/a	—N/a	5
13	Jonny Clayton	—N/a	—N/a	QF; 3	—N/a	1R; 1	—N/a	—N/a	4
14	Krzysztof Ratajski	—N/a	—N/a	—N/a	—N/a	QF; 3	—N/a	—N/a	3
15	Jason Brandon	—N/a	—N/a	—N/a	QF; 3	—N/a	—N/a	—N/a	3
16	Danny Lauby	—N/a	—N/a	—N/a	QF; 3	—N/a	—N/a	—N/a	3
17	Kevin Doets	—N/a	QF; 3	—N/a	—N/a	—N/a	—N/a	—N/a	3
18	Jermaine Wattimena	—N/a	QF; 3	—N/a	—N/a	—N/a	—N/a	—N/a	3
19	Raymond van Barneveld	—N/a	QF; 3	—N/a	—N/a	—N/a	—N/a	—N/a	3
20	Paolo Nebrida (Note: Nebrida declined his invitation to the World Series Finals.)	QF; 3	—N/a	—N/a	—N/a	—N/a	—N/a	—N/a	3
21	Haupai Puha	—N/a	—N/a	—N/a	—N/a	—N/a	1R; 1	1R; 1	2
22	Jonny Tata	—N/a	—N/a	—N/a	—N/a	—N/a	1R; 1	1R; 1	2
23	Simon Whitlock	—N/a	—N/a	—N/a	—N/a	—N/a	1R; 1	1R; 1	2

Order of Merit finishers on 1 point
#	Player	(Bahrain) BHR	(Netherlands) NED	(Denmark) NOR	(United States) USA	(Poland) POL	(Australia) AUS	(New Zealand) NZL	Total
	Mark Cleaver	—N/a	—N/a	—N/a	—N/a	—N/a	—N/a	1R; 1	1
	John Hurring	—N/a	—N/a	—N/a	—N/a	—N/a	—N/a	1R; 1	1
	Dean Reyland	—N/a	—N/a	—N/a	—N/a	—N/a	—N/a	1R; 1	1
	Gordon Mathers	—N/a	—N/a	—N/a	—N/a	—N/a	—N/a	1R; 1	1
	Ben Robb	—N/a	—N/a	—N/a	—N/a	—N/a	—N/a	1R; 1	1
	Joe Comito	—N/a	—N/a	—N/a	—N/a	—N/a	1R; 1	—N/a	1
	Brody Klinge	—N/a	—N/a	—N/a	—N/a	—N/a	1R; 1	—N/a	1
	James Bailey	—N/a	—N/a	—N/a	—N/a	—N/a	1R; 1	—N/a	1
	Brandon Weening	—N/a	—N/a	—N/a	—N/a	—N/a	1R; 1	—N/a	1
	Tim Pusey	—N/a	—N/a	—N/a	—N/a	—N/a	1R; 1	—N/a	1
	Krzysztof Kciuk	—N/a	—N/a	—N/a	—N/a	1R; 1	—N/a	—N/a	1
	György Jehirszki	—N/a	—N/a	—N/a	—N/a	1R; 1	—N/a	—N/a	1
	Radek Szagański	—N/a	—N/a	—N/a	—N/a	1R; 1	—N/a	—N/a	1
	Sebastian Białecki	—N/a	—N/a	—N/a	—N/a	1R; 1	—N/a	—N/a	1
	Tytus Kanik	—N/a	—N/a	—N/a	—N/a	1R; 1	—N/a	—N/a	1
	Pero Ljubić	—N/a	—N/a	—N/a	—N/a	1R; 1	—N/a	—N/a	1
	Karel Sedláček	—N/a	—N/a	—N/a	—N/a	1R; 1	—N/a	—N/a	1
	Stowe Buntz	—N/a	—N/a	—N/a	1R; 1	—N/a	—N/a	—N/a	1
	Leonard Gates	—N/a	—N/a	—N/a	1R; 1	—N/a	—N/a	—N/a	1
	Matt Campbell	—N/a	—N/a	—N/a	1R; 1	—N/a	—N/a	—N/a	1
	Jim Long	—N/a	—N/a	—N/a	1R; 1	—N/a	—N/a	—N/a	1
	Adam Sevada	—N/a	—N/a	—N/a	1R; 1	—N/a	—N/a	—N/a	1
	Jules van Dongen	—N/a	—N/a	—N/a	1R; 1	—N/a	—N/a	—N/a	1
	Viktor Tingström	—N/a	—N/a	1R; 1	—N/a	—N/a	—N/a	—N/a	1
	Andreas Harrysson	—N/a	—N/a	1R; 1	—N/a	—N/a	—N/a	—N/a	1
	Jeffrey de Graaf	—N/a	—N/a	1R; 1	—N/a	—N/a	—N/a	—N/a	1
	Cor Dekker	—N/a	—N/a	1R; 1	—N/a	—N/a	—N/a	—N/a	1
	Benjamin Reus	—N/a	—N/a	1R; 1	—N/a	—N/a	—N/a	—N/a	1
	Oskar Lukasiak	—N/a	—N/a	1R; 1	—N/a	—N/a	—N/a	—N/a	1
	Madars Razma	—N/a	—N/a	1R; 1	—N/a	—N/a	—N/a	—N/a	1
	Darius Labanauskas	—N/a	—N/a	1R; 1	—N/a	—N/a	—N/a	—N/a	1
	Dimitri Van den Bergh	—N/a	1R; 1	—N/a	—N/a	—N/a	—N/a	—N/a	1
	Richard Veenstra	—N/a	1R; 1	—N/a	—N/a	—N/a	—N/a	—N/a	1
	Danny Noppert	—N/a	1R; 1	—N/a	—N/a	—N/a	—N/a	—N/a	1
	Dirk van Duijvenbode	—N/a	1R; 1	—N/a	—N/a	—N/a	—N/a	—N/a	1
	Gian van Veen	—N/a	1R; 1	—N/a	—N/a	—N/a	—N/a	—N/a	1
	Lok Yin Lee	1R; 1	—N/a	—N/a	—N/a	—N/a	—N/a	—N/a	1
	Xiaochen Zong	1R; 1	—N/a	—N/a	—N/a	—N/a	—N/a	—N/a	1
	Alexis Toylo	1R; 1	—N/a	—N/a	—N/a	—N/a	—N/a	—N/a	1
	Nitin Kumar	1R; 1	—N/a	—N/a	—N/a	—N/a	—N/a	—N/a	1
	Abdulla Saeed	1R; 1	—N/a	—N/a	—N/a	—N/a	—N/a	—N/a	1
	Lourence Ilagan	1R; 1	—N/a	—N/a	—N/a	—N/a	—N/a	—N/a	1
	Basem Mahmood	1R; 1	—N/a	—N/a	—N/a	—N/a	—N/a	—N/a	1

== Top averages ==
The table lists all players who achieved an average of at least 100 in a match. In the case one player has multiple records, this is indicated by the number in brackets.

#	Player	Round	Average	Event	Result
1	Gerwyn Price	Quarter Final	115.31	Bahrain Masters	Won
2	Luke Littler	Final	115.02	New Zealand Masters	Won
3	Stephen Bunting	Quarter Final	111.33	Bahrain Masters	Won
4	Chris Dobey	Quarter Final	110.36	New Zealand Masters	Won
5	Damon Heta	1st Round	109.98	(Australia) Australian Masters	Won
6	Luke Littler (2)	Quarter Final	108.89	(United States) US Masters	Lost
7	Luke Littler (3)	Semi Final	108.81	New Zealand Masters	Won
8	Gerwyn Price (2)	Quarter Final	108.26	(Denmark) Nordic Masters	Won
9	Josh Rock	1st Round	108.16	(Australia) Australian Masters	Won
10	Stephen Bunting (2)	Quarter Final	108.00	New Zealand Masters	Lost
11	Luke Littler (4)	Semi Final	107.59	(Netherlands) Dutch Masters	Lost
12	Josh Rock (2)	2nd Round	107.36	(Netherlands) World Series Finals	Won
13	Luke Littler (5)	Quarter Final	107.31	(Netherlands) World Series Finals	Won
14	Michael van Gerwen	Quarter Final	106.45	(Netherlands) World Series Finals	Won
15	Ross Smith	Quarter Final	106.12	(Netherlands) World Series Finals	Lost
16	Nathan Aspinall	Quarter Final	105.88	(United States) US Masters	Won
17	Gian van Veen	1st Round	105.13	(Netherlands) Dutch Masters	Lost
18	Luke Littler (6)	Quarter Final	105.12	Bahrain Masters	Lost
19	Luke Littler (7)	Quarter Final	104.88	Poland Masters	Won
20	Michael van Gerwen (2)	1st Round	104.75	(Netherlands) World Series Finals	Won
21	Nathan Aspinall (2)	1st Round	104.68	(United States) US Masters	Won
22	Damon Heta (2)	Semi Final	104.34	(United States) US Masters	Lost
23	Gerwyn Price (3)	Quarter Final	104.29	Poland Masters	Won
24	Stephen Bunting (3)	Semi Final	104.12	Poland Masters	Won
25	Mike De Decker	Quarter Final	103.66	(Australia) Australian Masters	Won
26	Luke Humphries	1st Round	103.66	Bahrain Masters	Won
27	Gerwyn Price (4)	1st Round	103.60	New Zealand Masters	Won
28	Gerwyn Price (5)	Final	103.12	Poland Masters	Won
29	Gerwyn Price (6)	Semi Final	103.03	New Zealand Masters	Lost
30	Gerwyn Price (7)	2nd Round	102.97	(Netherlands) World Series Finals	Won
31	Luke Littler (8)	Quarter Final	102.84	(Australia) Australian Masters	Won
32	Gerwyn Price (8)	1st Round	102.47	(United States) US Masters	Won
33	Luke Humphries (2)	Semi Final	102.43	New Zealand Masters	Won
34	Stephen Bunting (4)	Semi Final	102.35	(Australia) Australian Masters	Lost
35	Luke Humphries (3)	Final	102.31	New Zealand Masters	Lost
36	Michael van Gerwen (2)	Semi Final	102.09	(Netherlands) World Series Finals	Won
37	Stephen Bunting (5)	Semi Final	102.06	(Netherlands) Dutch Masters	Won
38	Nathan Aspinall (3)	Semi Final	102.00	(United States) US Masters	Won
39	Luke Littler (9)	Final	101.99	(Netherlands) World Series Finals	Lost
40	Nathan Aspinall (4)	Quarter Final	101.90	Bahrain Masters	Lost
41	Rob Cross (2)	Final	101.87	(Netherlands) Dutch Masters	Won
42	Luke Humphries (4)	2nd Round	101.87	(Netherlands) World Series Finals	Won
43	Gerwyn Price (9)	1st Round	101.85	(Netherlands) Dutch Masters	Won
44	Wessel Nijman	1st Round	101.45	(Netherlands) World Series Finals	Lost
45	Gerwyn Price (10)	Quarter Final	101.42	(Australia) Australian Masters	Lost
46	Jonny Clayton	1st Round	101.33	(Netherlands) World Series Finals	Won
47	Stephen Bunting (6)	1st Round	101.29	(Australia) Australian Masters	Won
48	Luke Littler (10)	1st Round	101.07	(Netherlands) Dutch Masters	Won
49	Chris Dobey (2)	1st Round	100.84	Poland Masters	Won
50	Raymond van Barneveld	2nd Round	100.73	(Netherlands) World Series Finals	Lost
51	Gerwyn Price (11)	Semi Final	100.68	Poland Masters	Won
52	Luke Humphries (5)	Quarter Final	100.47	Bahrain Masters	Won
53	Gerwyn Price (12)	1st Round	100.45	(Australia) Australian Masters	Won
54	Gerwyn Price (13)	1st Round	100.43	(Denmark) Nordic Masters	Won
55	Luke Littler (11)	Quarter Final	100.33	(Denmark) Nordic Masters	Lost
56	Krzysztof Ratajski	1st Round	100.31	Poland Masters	Won
57	Gerwyn Price (14)	Quarter Final	100.29	(Netherlands) World Series Finals	Won
58	Danny Noppert	2nd Round	100.19	(Netherlands) World Series Finals	Lost
59	Rob Cross (3)	Semi Final	100.10	(Netherlands) Dutch Masters	Won
60	Luke Littler (12)	Semi Final	100.09	Poland Masters	Lost
61	Luke Littler (13)	Semi Final	100.08	(Netherlands) World Series Finals	Won
62	Luke Littler (14)	Quarter Final	100.03	New Zealand Masters	Won
