= Eleanor Gudger =

English poker player

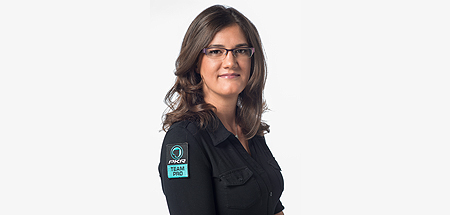
- Born: Yarm, North Yorkshire, England

World Series of Poker
- Highest WSOP Main Event finish: 1st (Dusk Till Dawn)

Eleanor Gudger is an English professional poker player. She is one of the few professional poker players in the United Kingdom who has enjoyed a sponsorship deal, with the now defunct PKR.com. She is most known for her WPT500 victory at Nottingham's inaugural Dusk till Dawn (DTD) event in November 2014.

== Biography ==
Gudger is from Yarm, North Yorkshire, England. She began playing pub poker while living in London and has spoken about the importance of the grassroots game, especially for female players. Before going professional in 2010, Gudger worked a 50-hour-week job in IT operations and sales.

Operating under the pseudonym Elz442, Gudger is known for coming second in the 2011 World Series of Poker Europe Ladies event. This was followed by her WPT500 victory at Nottingham's inaugural Dusk till Dawn (DTD) event in November 2014, where she earned $222,177 and topped a field of over 2,000 players. After this win she was signed as a PKR.com brand ambassador from March 2014 until October 2015, when PKR dissolved the team.

By 2015, Gudger had two World Series of Poker cashes, the larger a final table at the 2013 ladies event, for a little over $27,000. She was fourth at the 2016 Goliath Phamous Poker Series in Las Vegas, third at the 2017 PokerStars Festival in London, and fifth in the 2018 Summer Poker Series in Las Vegas.

A tournament specialist, Gudger's combined live and online earnings total over $545,000. She has been described as "a real old-fashioned chip getter" with "a wonderful game."
