= Videoslots =

Maltese gambling website

Videoslots Ltd
- Industry: Online casino and online sportsbook
- Founded: 2011; 15 years ago
- Founder: Alexander Stevendahl
- Headquarters: Pietà, Malta
- Products: Casino, Slots, Table games, Sports, Tipset
- Number of employees: 300+
- Parent: Immense Group
- Website: www.videoslots.com

Videoslots is an online casino gambling company, founded in 2011 and headquartered in Malta. It is licensed by the Malta Gaming Authority, Swedish Gambling Authority (Spelinspektionen), the Gambling Commission of the United Kingdom, the Danish Gambling Authority (Spillemyndigheden), Italian Gambling Authority (ADM) and Spanish Gambling Authority (DGOJ). On Dec 10th, 2024 the company became part of Immense Group AB holding.

== History ==
Established in 2011 and based in Malta, Videoslots is an online casino with more than 10,000 gaming slots. Alexander Stevendahl is the chief executive officer of Videoslots. Jesper Kärrbrink is the chief executive officer of Immense Group AB.

In 2017, Videoslots purchased the technology assets of PKR.com, an online poker operator.

In 2017, the company hosted its first annual awards, named the Videoslots Awards. In 2018, they became an official partner of the Malta Handball Association.

In 2018, Videoslots reached a settlement of £1 million in fines with the UK Gambling Commission (UKGC) regulatory authority for historical failings to "place effective safeguards" within their casino system.

In 2020, Videoslots expanded their product offering and added Sportsbook as a new vertical.

In 2021, Videoslots launched a new online casino, Mr Vegas. In 2023, Mr Vegas became title sponsor of the Grand Slam of Darts and the Nordic Darts Masters, took the back of shirt sponsorship of West Bromwich Albion for the 2023/24 season. In 2024 became Principal Partner of Sheffield Wednesday and signed as main sponsor of 2024 World Seniors Snooker Championship. Mr Vegas won the "Rising Star" Award at the 2024 International Gaming Awards and "Rising Star Operator" at the 2024 EGR Operator Award. Videoslots won the "Slot Operator of the Year at the 2025 International Gaming Awards

In 2024, Videoslots released two online casino sites, Kungaslottet, for the Swedish market and Mega Riches in the UK. Mega Riches signed the back of shirt sponsorship of West Bromwich Albion for the 2024/2025 season. It also released DBET as a sportsbook site for Sweden, signed former football player Anders Svensson as brand ambassador, became the main partner of the Swedish Bandy Federation and Swedish Bandy League.

== Awards ==
2015	Best Online Casino Award	Casinomeister
2015	Best Gaming Experience Award	Casinomeister
2016	Best Slots Operator Award	Gaming Intelligence Awards
2017	Gaming Intelligence HOT 50 CEOs	Gaming Intelligence Awards
2017	Compliance and Regulated Markets Idol of the Year	iGaming Idol
2017	Trusted Affiliate Award	GAFFG Awards
2017	Best Casino Award	Casinomeister
2018	Best Slots Operator Award	11th International Gaming Awards
2018	Best Casino Award	Casinomeister
2018	Best Gaming Experience Award	Casinomeister
2019	Great Place to Work (Operator)	12th International Gaming Awards
2019	Customer Service Idol of the Year	iGaming Idol
2019	Leader of the Year in Casino Operator	SBC Awards
2021	Slots Operator of the Year	IGA Awards
2021	Casino Operator of the Year	SIGMA
2023	Online Casino Operator of the Year	IGA
2024	Rising Star of the Year (Mr Vegas)	IGA
2024	Operator Rising Star (Mr Vegas)	EGR
2025	Slot Operator of the Year	IGA
