= PKR.com =

Poker company

- Website type: online poker, online casino, live dealer
- Owner: Jez San
- Website: www.pkr.com
- Commercial: Yes
- Launched: June 2006
- Current status: Offline

PKR.com (also PKR) was an Alderney, UK-based online poker room that allowed users to play poker in a virtual reality setting. The site customized 3D graphics and player character animation during poker play. The characters incorporated body language, expressions, chip tricks and poker tells to make the game more realistic.

PKR was founded by Jez San and launched in June 2006. At its peak it grew to more than 5 million users and 15,000 users playing simultaneously. In August 2007, PKR signed a license agreement making Playtech their exclusive provider of casino software.

In response to the Unlawful Internet Gambling Enforcement Act of 2006, PKR barred US-based players.

In April 2007 PKR partnered with UBT to launch Poker and BlackJack tournaments at Sea from both sites.

In November 2008, PKR held its first in-person poker tournament in London, and 150 players from several countries participated.

In December 2009 PKR partnered with Nuts and Loaded men's magazines which saw the launch of branded poker rooms within PKR's 3D poker client as well as Nuts and Loaded avatar items which players could wear at the tables.

In February 2016 PKR gave up its independent status after ten years and became a skin on the Microgaming Poker Network (MPN).

PKR ceased operations in May 2017. In July 2017, PokerStars agreed to a deal with bankruptcy administrators to acquire some of the PKR's assets and in doing so will reimburse 60,000 PKR players 100% of their final balances.

In November 2017, Maltese online casino Videoslots purchased the technology assets from the PKR portfolio.
