= List of players with a 2025 PDC Tour Card =

PDC Tour Card holders in 2025

The Professional Darts Corporation (PDC) grants a Tour Card every year to 128 darts players, which allows them to compete in all PDC ProTour tournaments, those being all Players Championships and European Tours (or qualifiers to the later events in case the player has not automatically qualified). Additionally, holding a PDC Tour Card offers further benefits such as automatic qualifications for the UK Open or participation in the qualifying rounds for the World Darts Championship, Grand Slam and World Masters, among others.

PDC Tour Cards are valid for two years. The top 64 players in the PDC Order of Merit (OoM) and the players who won a card last year automatically receive Tour Cards for the rest of the year. Tour Cards can be removed if any player resigns it, do not compete in any ProTour event during their first year of their card, or have been banned for a period longer than the remaining duration of the card.

The top two players from last year's secondary tours (Challenge Tour and Development Tour), along with the players who earned a Tour Card at this year's UK & European Q-Schools, are awarded two-year long cards. All these players have their Order of Merit rankings reset to zero since the beginning of the season.

According to PDC Order of Merit Rule 3.2, in case a tie occurs when two or more players have the same amount of money in the PDC Order of Merit, the countback rule is used to break the tie. This rule looks at the cumulative money won by each player in the previous four eligible events, with the players who gained more money being placed higher in the ranking.

World number 56 Steve Beaton resigned his Tour Card and retired from professional darts, which allowed Nick Kenny to move into the top 64 and retain his Tour Card. Leighton Bennett's Tour Card, which he won at the 2024 Q-School, was removed as he had received an eight-year suspension from events sanctioned by the Darts Regulation Authority (DRA). Paul Krohne voluntarily gave back his Tour Card which he won at 2024 Q-School.

== List of players ==
The following is the list of darts players with a 2025 PDC Tour Card:

No.	Country	Player	Prize money	Qualified through
1	England	Luke Humphries	£1,804,250	Top 64 of Order of Merit
2	England	Luke Littler	£1,118,500	Top 64 of Order of Merit
3	Netherlands	Michael van Gerwen	£815,500	Top 64 of Order of Merit
4	England	Rob Cross	£551,750	Top 64 of Order of Merit
5	England	Stephen Bunting	£536,000	Top 64 of Order of Merit
6	England	Dave Chisnall	£528,500	Top 64 of Order of Merit
7	Wales	Jonny Clayton	£494,000	Top 64 of Order of Merit
8	Australia	Damon Heta	£484,000	Top 64 of Order of Merit
9	Wales	Gerwyn Price	£480,500	Top 64 of Order of Merit
10	England	Chris Dobey	£480,250	Top 64 of Order of Merit
11	England	Nathan Aspinall	£470,500	Top 64 of Order of Merit
12	Scotland	Peter Wright	£442,500	Top 64 of Order of Merit
13	Netherlands	Danny Noppert	£431,750	Top 64 of Order of Merit
14	Scotland	Gary Anderson	£430,500	Top 64 of Order of Merit
15	England	James Wade	£426,750	Top 64 of Order of Merit
16	Northern Ireland	Josh Rock	£405,000	Top 64 of Order of Merit
17	England	Michael Smith	£405,000	Top 64 of Order of Merit
18	Belgium	Dimitri Van den Bergh	£399,250	Top 64 of Order of Merit
19	England	Ryan Searle	£398,250	Top 64 of Order of Merit
20	England	Andrew Gilding	£395,500	Top 64 of Order of Merit
21	England	Ross Smith	£395,000	Top 64 of Order of Merit
22	Germany	Martin Schindler	£365,000	Top 64 of Order of Merit
23	England	Joe Cullen	£357,250	Top 64 of Order of Merit
24	Belgium	Mike De Decker	£356,000	Top 64 of Order of Merit
25	Northern Ireland	Daryl Gurney	£334,250	Top 64 of Order of Merit
26	Netherlands	Dirk van Duijvenbode	£325,750	Top 64 of Order of Merit
27	Netherlands	Gian van Veen	£299,000	Top 64 of Order of Merit
28	England	Ritchie Edhouse	£289,250	Top 64 of Order of Merit
29	England	Ryan Joyce	£282,000	Top 64 of Order of Merit
30	Germany	Ricardo Pietreczko	£280,750	Top 64 of Order of Merit
31	Northern Ireland	Brendan Dolan	£271,500	Top 64 of Order of Merit
32	Poland	Krzysztof Ratajski	£267,750	Top 64 of Order of Merit
33	England	Luke Woodhouse	£262,750	Top 64 of Order of Merit
34	Netherlands	Raymond van Barneveld	£252,750	Top 64 of Order of Merit
35	Netherlands	Jermaine Wattimena	£240,250	Top 64 of Order of Merit
36	England	Scott Williams	£220,750	Top 64 of Order of Merit
37	Germany	Gabriel Clemens	£219,750	Top 64 of Order of Merit
38	England	Martin Lukeman	£202,500	Top 64 of Order of Merit
39	Scotland	Cameron Menzies	£178,000	Top 64 of Order of Merit
40	England	Callan Rydz	£177,000	Top 64 of Order of Merit
41	Netherlands	Kevin Doets	£146,500	Top 64 of Order of Merit
42	Latvia	Madars Razma	£144,750	Top 64 of Order of Merit
43	Northern Ireland	Mickey Mansell	£143,250	Top 64 of Order of Merit
44	England	Ricky Evans	£142,250	Top 64 of Order of Merit
45	Portugal	José de Sousa	£139,000	Top 64 of Order of Merit
46	Belgium	Kim Huybrechts	£136,000	Top 64 of Order of Merit
47	Netherlands	Richard Veenstra	£122,750	Top 64 of Order of Merit
48	Netherlands	Niels Zonneveld	£121,250	Top 64 of Order of Merit
49	England	Ian White	£116,250	Top 64 of Order of Merit
50	Ireland	Keane Barry	£115,250	Top 64 of Order of Merit
51	Wales	Jim Williams	£111,250	Top 64 of Order of Merit
52	Ireland	William O'Connor	£107,000	Top 64 of Order of Merit
53	Germany	Florian Hempel	£103,000	Top 64 of Order of Merit
54	Canada	Matt Campbell	£103,000	Top 64 of Order of Merit
55	Netherlands	Wessel Nijman	£100,000	Top 64 of Order of Merit
56	Scotland	Alan Soutar	£85,500	Top 64 of Order of Merit
57	Ireland	Dylan Slevin	£80,500	Top 64 of Order of Merit
58	Wales	Robert Owen	£80,250	Top 64 of Order of Merit
59	England	Ryan Meikle	£78,500	Top 64 of Order of Merit
60	England	Stephen Burton	£78,000	Top 64 of Order of Merit
61	England	Connor Scutt	£77,000	Top 64 of Order of Merit
62	Austria	Mensur Suljović	£75,250	Top 64 of Order of Merit
63	Sweden	Jeffrey de Graaf	£75,000	Top 64 of Order of Merit
64	Wales	Nick Kenny	£71,750	Top 64 of Order of Merit
65	France	Thibault Tricole	£57,250	2024 Q-School
66	England	James Hurrell	£45,750	2024 Q-School
67	England	Dom Taylor	£39,500	2024 Q-School
68	Netherlands	Chris Landman	£39,250	2024 Q-School
69	Belgium	Mario Vandenbogaerde	£31,000	2024 Q-School
70	Wales	Rhys Griffin	£28,000	2024 Q-School
71	Belgium	Andy Baetens	£24,500	2024 Q-School
72	Netherlands	Berry van Peer	£23,500	2023 Challenge Tour
73	Northern Ireland	Nathan Rafferty	£22,250	2023 Development Tour
74	Ireland	Steve Lennon	£22,000	2024 Q-School
75	Poland	Radek Szagański	£21,750	2024 Q-School
76	Germany	Lukas Wenig	£21,500	2024 Q-School
77	Netherlands	Patrick Geeraets	£19,000	2024 Q-School
78	England	Matthew Dennant	£19,000	2024 Q-School
79	Scotland	Darren Beveridge	£18,750	2024 Q-School
80	Netherlands	Jitse van der Wal	£18,250	2024 Q-School
81	Denmark	Benjamin Reus	£18,000	2024 Q-School
82	United States	Danny Lauby	£17,000	2024 Q-School
83	England	Robert Grundy	£16,500	2024 Q-School
84	England	George Killington	£14,500	2024 Q-School
85	England	Owen Bates	£14,000	2023 Challenge Tour
86	England	Brett Claydon	£13,750	2024 Q-School
87	Netherlands	Martijn Dragt	£13,500	2024 Q-School
88	England	Adam Hunt	£13,500	2024 Q-School
89	New Zealand	Haupai Puha	£12,500	2024 Q-School
90	Netherlands	Jelle Klaasen	£11,750	2024 Q-School
91	Scotland	William Borland	£11,500	2024 Q-School
92	Germany	Tim Wolters	£7,500	2024 Q-School
93	England	Joshua Richardson	£7,500	2024 Q-School
94	Italy	Michele Turetta	£6,000	2024 Q-School
95	United States	Jules van Dongen	£4,000	2024 Q-School
96	Netherlands	Wesley Plaisier	£0	2024 Challenge Tour
97	Netherlands	Christian Kist	£0	2024 Challenge Tour
98	Germany	Niko Springer	£0	2024 Development Tour
99	Poland	Sebastian Białecki	£0	2024 Development Tour
100	England	Tom Bissell	£0	2025 Q-School
101	Sweden	Viktor Tingström	£0	2025 Q-School
102	Germany	Kai Gotthardt	£0	2025 Q-School
103	England	Justin Hood	£0	2025 Q-School
104	England	Tavis Dudeney	£0	2025 Q-School
105	Netherlands	Dennie Olde Kalter	£0	2025 Q-School
106	England	Bradley Brooks	£0	2025 Q-School
107	Norway	Cor Dekker	£0	2025 Q-School
108	Scotland	Greg Ritchie	£0	2025 Q-School
109	Czech Republic	Karel Sedláček	£0	2025 Q-School
110	Poland	Tytus Kanik	£0	2025 Q-School
111	Netherlands	Maik Kuivenhoven	£0	2025 Q-School
112	Austria	Rusty-Jake Rodriguez	£0	2025 Q-School
113	Sweden	Oskar Lukasiak	£0	2025 Q-School
114	England	Adam Paxton	£0	2025 Q-School
115	Germany	Dominik Grüllich	£0	2025 Q-School
116	England	Darryl Pilgrim	£0	2025 Q-School
117	England	Cam Crabtree	£0	2025 Q-School
118	England	Adam Warner	£0	2025 Q-School
119	Belgium	Stefaan Henderyck	£0	2025 Q-School
120	England	Adam Lipscombe	£0	2025 Q-School
121	Croatia	Pero Ljubić	£0	2025 Q-School
122	Germany	Max Hopp	£0	2025 Q-School
123	Germany	Maximilian Czerwinski	£0	2025 Q-School
124	Scotland	Andy Boulton	£0	2025 Q-School
125	Netherlands	Marvin van Velzen	£0	2025 Q-School
126	Germany	Leon Weber	£0	2025 Q-School
127	Canada	Jim Long	£0	2025 Q-School
128	England	Thomas Lovely	£0	2025 Q-School

== Tour Cards per nation ==
No.	Nation	Number of Tour card holders	Difference to prior year
1	England	43	-2
2	Netherlands	21	-3
3	Germany	12	+3
4	Scotland	8	+2
5	Belgium	6	-1
5	Wales	6	-1
7	Northern Ireland	5	0
8	Ireland	4	0
8	Poland	4	+2
10	Sweden	3	+2
11	Austria	2	0
11	Canada	2	+1
11	United States	2	0
14	Australia	1	-1
14	Croatia	1	0
14	Czech Republic	1	-1
14	Denmark	1	0
14	France	1	-1
14	Italy	1	0
14	Latvia	1	0
14	New Zealand	1	0
14	Norway	1	+1
14	Portugal	1	0
-	Philippines	0	-1
	23 Nations	128 players	
