= 2024 in darts =

This topic lists the darts events for the 2024 year.

== Professional Darts Corporation ==
Major events

- December 15, 2023 – January 3: 2024 PDC World Darts Championship in (England) London
  - Winner: (England) Luke Humphries
- February 2–4: 2024 Masters in (England) Milton Keynes
  - Winner: (England) Stephen Bunting
- February 1 – May 23: 2024 Premier League Darts
  - Winner: (England) Luke Littler
- March 1–3: 2024 UK Open in (England) Minehead
  - Winner: (Belgium) Dimitri Van den Bergh
- June 27–30: 2024 PDC World Cup of Darts in (Germany) Frankfurt
  - Winner: England
- July 13–21: 2024 World Matchplay in (England) Blackpool
  - Winner: (England) Luke Humphries
- October 7–13: 2024 World Grand Prix in Leicester
  - Winner: (Belgium) Mike De Decker
- October 24–27: 2024 European Championship in (Germany) Dortmund
  - Winner: (England) Ritchie Edhouse
- November 9–17: 2024 Grand Slam of Darts in (England) Wolverhampton
  - Winner: (England) Luke Littler
- November 22–24: 2024 Players Championship Finals in (England) Minehead
  - Winner: (England) Luke Humphries

== World Series of Darts ==
- January 18–19: 2024 Bahrain Darts Masters in Sakhir
  - Winner: (England) Luke Littler
- January 26–27: 2024 Dutch Darts Masters in (Netherlands) 's-Hertogenbosch
  - Winner: (Netherlands) Michael van Gerwen
- May 31 – June 1: 2024 US Darts Masters in (United States) New York City
  - Winner: (England) Rob Cross
- June 7–8: 2024 Nordic Darts Masters in (Denmark) Copenhagen
  - Winner: (Wales) Gerwyn Price
- June 14–15: 2024 Poland Darts Masters in Gliwice
  - Winner: (England) Luke Littler
- August 9–10: 2024 Australian Darts Masters in (Australia) Wollongong
  - Winner: (Wales) Gerwyn Price
- August 16–17: 2024 New Zealand Darts Masters in Hamilton
  - Winner: (England) Luke Humphries
- September 13–15: 2024 World Series of Darts Finals in (Netherlands) Amsterdam
  - Winner: (England) Luke Littler

== World Darts Federation ==
Major events

- February 3–4: Dutch Open in (Netherlands) Assen
  - Winners: (Netherlands) Jarno Bottenberg (m) / (England) Beau Greaves (w)
- November 29 – December 8: 2024 WDF World Darts Championship in (England) Frimley Green
