= 2025 New Zealand Darts Masters =

Darts tournament in New Zealand

2025 SkyCity New Zealand Darts Masters

Tournament information
- Dates: 15–16 August 2025
- Venue: Spark Arena
- Location: Auckland, New Zealand
- Organisation(s): Professional Darts Corporation (PDC)
- Format: Legs
- Prize fund: £100,000
- Winner's share: £30,000
- High checkout: 170 Luke Littler

Champion(s)
- Luke Littler (ENG)

The 2025 New Zealand Darts Masters (known for sponsorship reasons as the 2025 SkyCity New Zealand Darts Masters) was the fifth staging of the professional darts tournament by the Professional Darts Corporation (PDC), and the seventh and final event in the 2025 World Series of Darts before the World Series Finals. The tournament, sponsored by SkyCity, featured 16 players (eight elite PDC players and eight Oceania representatives) and was held at the Spark Arena in Auckland, New Zealand on 15 and 16 August 2025.

Luke Humphries was the defending champion after defeating Damon Heta 8–2 in the 2024 final. Luke Littler won the tournament by beating Humphries 8–4 in the final. The victory was Littler's second World Series title of the year and his second successive title in 2 weeks, as well as the fourth World Series title of his career.

== Overview ==
=== Format ===
Eight elite PDC representatives were drawn to play eight Oceania representatives in the first round on Friday 15 August; the quarter-finals, semi-finals and final all took place on Saturday 16 August. All matches were in leg play format, with the number of legs required to win increasing as the tournament progressed:

- First round and quarter-finals: Best of eleven legs
- Semi-finals: Best of thirteen legs
- Final: Best of fifteen legs

=== Prize money ===
The winner received £30,000. The total prize fund was £100,000.

Position (no. of players)		Prize money (Total: £100,000)
Winner	(1)	£30,000
Runner-up	(1)	£16,000
Semi-finalists	(2)	£10,000
Quarter-finalists	(4)	£5,000
First round	(8)	£1,750

=== Broadcasts ===
The tournament was broadcast on the PDC's streaming service, PDCTV, in the United Kingdom, with delayed coverage airing on ITV4 and ITVX. Other broadcasters included Sky Sport in New Zealand; Fox Sports in Australia; DAZN in Germany, Austria and Switzerland; FanDuel in the United States and Canada; Viaplay in the Netherlands and Scandinavia; Nova in Czechia and Slovakia; and Sport1 in Hungary. It was also available on PDCTV to international subscribers.

== Qualifiers ==
The PDC announced the first six players participating as their elite representatives on 14 May, with two more players to be confirmed. Michael van Gerwen, Rob Cross and Nathan Aspinall were absent from the lineup due to family reasons. On 15 July, 2025 World Cup winner Josh Rock and 2024 World Grand Prix winner Mike De Decker were announced as the final two PDC representatives, with both making their World Series debut the week prior at the Australian Masters.

The seedings are based on the 2025 World Series rankings after six events:

1. Stephen Bunting (quarter-finals)
2. Gerwyn Price (semi-finals)
3. Luke Littler (champion)
4. Luke Humphries (runner-up)
5. Chris Dobey (semi-finals)
6. Mike De Decker (quarter-finals)
7. Damon Heta (quarter-finals)
8. Josh Rock (quarter-finals)

The first two Oceania representatives announced were Simon Whitlock, who has competed in every World Series event held in Oceania, and Haupai Puha, who was the first player from New Zealand to earn a PDC Tour Card. They were joined by the three highest-ranked players on the Dartplayers New Zealand (DPNZ) Order of Merit: Jonny Tata, Mark Cleaver and John Hurring. Ben Robb and Dean Reyland qualified for the tournament through DPNZ qualifiers. The final place was claimed by Gordon Mathers, who won the Dartplayers Australia (DPA) qualifier.

Qualification	Player
Invitees	Simon Whitlock (first round)
PDC Tour Card holders	Haupai Puha (first round)
DPNZ qualifiers	Jonny Tata (first round)
DPNZ qualifiers	Mark Cleaver (first round)
DPNZ qualifiers	John Hurring (first round)
DPNZ qualifiers	Ben Robb (first round)
DPNZ qualifiers	Dean Reyland (first round)
DPA qualifier	Gordon Mathers (first round)

== Summary ==
=== First round ===
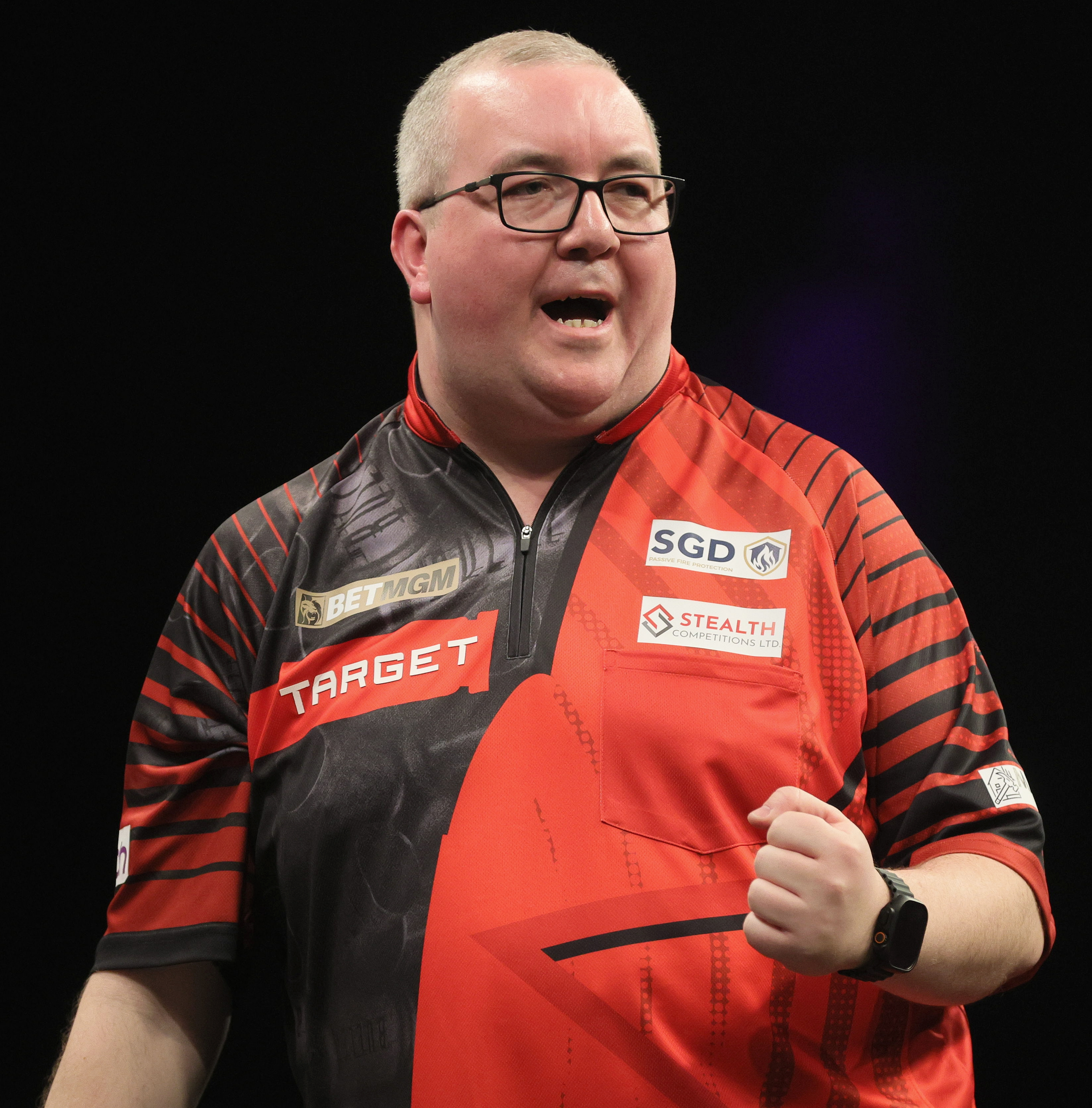
Top seed Stephen Bunting (pictured) won his opening match 6–3 against Ben Robb. He later guaranteed his place as the number one seed at the World Series Finals.

The first round was played on 15 August. All eight PDC representatives advanced to the quarter-finals. Defending champion and world number one Luke Humphries began his title defence with a 6–3 win over Haupai Puha but admitted that he was unhappy with his recent performances. Having lost his opening match at the World Cup of Darts and the World Matchplay, he called his form after winning the Premier League "depressing". He hoped that he could "be the Luke Humphries that everybody knows" the following night. New Zealand representative Mark Cleaver came back from 3–0 down against reigning world champion Luke Littler to level their match at 4–4, but Littler took the next two legs to win 6–4. The Englishman commented that Cleaver was "not the quickest player" and thus found it difficult to maintain rhythm throughout the match. Gerwyn Price, who won the tournament in 2022, missed double 12 for a nine-dart finish in the fifth leg of his match with Jonny Tata before securing a 6–4 victory, recording a three-dart average of 103.60 in the process. 56-year-old Dean Reyland, owner of a kiwifruit orchard in Katikati, made his World Series debut in a 6–1 losing effort to 2024 runner-up Damon Heta. Top seed Stephen Bunting beat Ben Robb 6–3, while Chris Dobey defeated Simon Whitlock 6–4 with a high checkout of 154. Josh Rock averaged 99.87 in his 6–2 win over John Hurring and Mike De Decker defeated Gordon Mathers 6–1 to complete the quarter-final lineup.

=== Quarter-finals, semi-finals and final ===
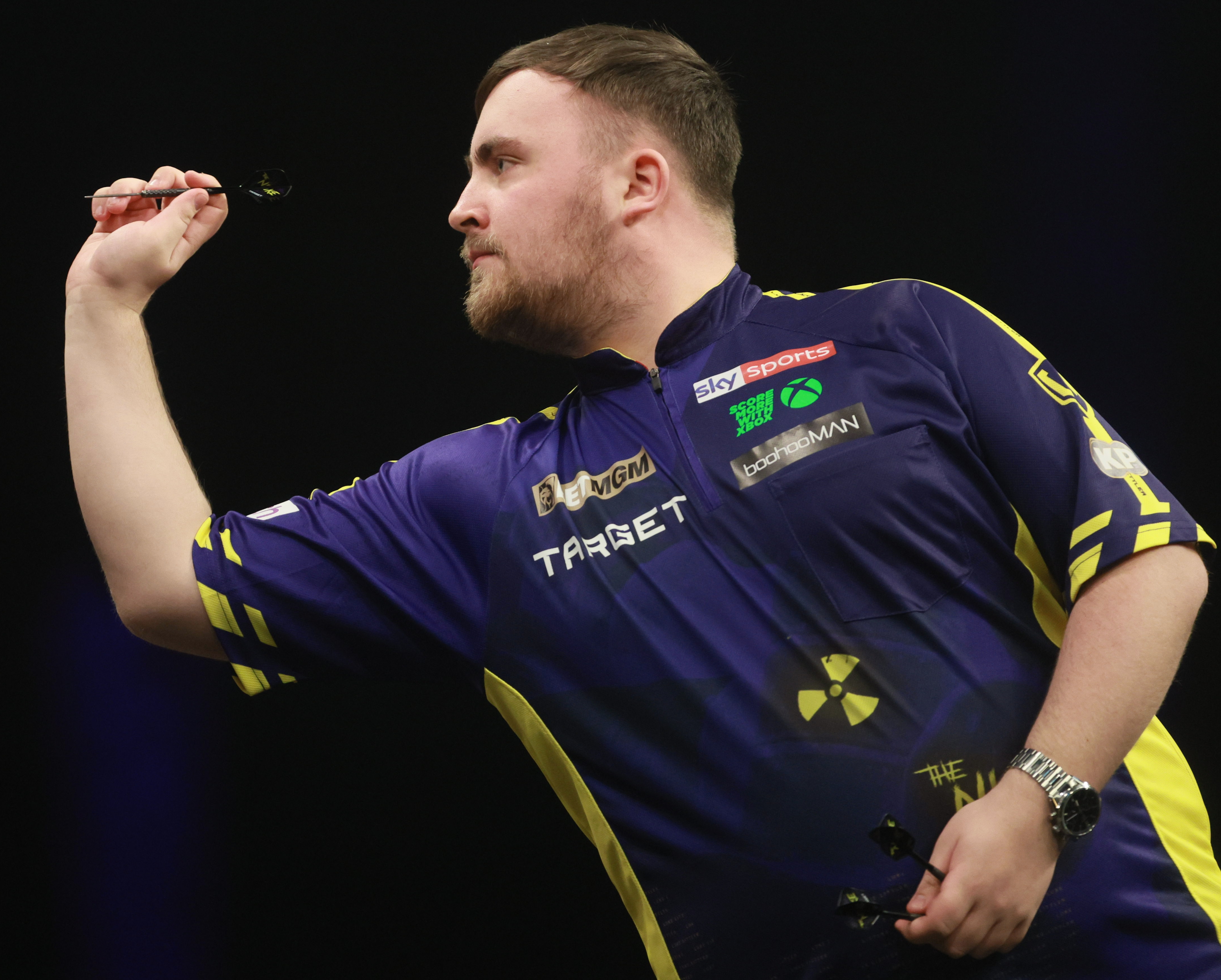
Luke Littler (pictured) completed a World Series double Down Under by winning the Australian Masters and the New Zealand Masters.

The quarter-finals, semi-finals and final were played on 16 August. Chris Dobey won the opening quarter-final match 6–3 against Stephen Bunting in a high-quality contest; Dobey defied a 108 average from Bunting while averaging 110.36 himself. Bunting remained at number one on the World Series Order of Merit despite the loss, guaranteeing he would be top seed at the World Series Finals. Luke Littler produced a 170 checkout in the third leg of his match with Mike De Decker before advancing with a 6–2 victory, registering his sixth consecutive win against the Belgian. Gerwyn Price and Josh Rock went to a deciding leg that resulted in a 6–5 win for Price, while Luke Humphries continued his run by beating Damon Heta 6–2. In the semi-finals, Littler only conceded two legs once more as he defeated Price 7–2, with Humphries beating Dobey 7–4 to set up a final between Littler and Humphries. Defending champion Humphries looked to retain the title he won in 2024, while Littler aimed to complete a World Series double after winning the Australian Masters the week prior.

Littler opened the final with a 3–0 lead, but missed attempts at double allowed Humphries to pull it back to 3–2. Littler won the next three legs to lead 6–2. Humphries reduced his deficit to two legs as he held throw twice, but Littler produced successive 11-dart legs to secure an 8–4 victory. It was Littler's second World Series title of 2025 and his fourth overall. He finished the match with an average of 115.02 – the highest average recorded in a World Series event final. It was also his fourth consecutive win against Humphries, with the career head-to-head between the two becoming 8–7 in Littler's favour. In his post-match interview, Littler acknowledged his "shaky start" against Mark Cleaver in his opening match but said that he knew he had to "switch it on" for finals night. He likened the atmosphere in the Spark Arena to a Premier League night, stating that he "felt unbeatable up there" on the stage. Humphries commented that "when you run into a 115 average, there's not much you can do".

== Draw ==
The draw was announced on 14 August. Numbers to the left of players' names show the seedings for the top four in the tournament. The figures to the right of a player's name state their three-dart average in a match. Players in bold denote match winners.

**First round** (best of 11 legs); 15 August
**1**	**Stephen Bunting 92.33**	**6**
Ben Robb 88.90	3
**Chris Dobey 88.71**	**6**
Simon Whitlock 84.55	4
**4**	**Luke Humphries 89.47**	**6**
Haupai Puha 86.29	3
**Damon Heta 86.69**	**6**
Dean Reyland 72.29	1
**2**	**Gerwyn Price 103.60**	**6**
Jonny Tata 96.81	4
**Josh Rock 99.87**	**6**
John Hurring 85.77	2
**3**	**Luke Littler 95.60**	**6**
Mark Cleaver 87.73	4
**Mike De Decker 94.40**	**6**
Gordon Mathers 79.06	1

**Quarter-finals** (best of 11 legs); 16 August
1	Stephen Bunting 108.00	3
**Chris Dobey 110.36**	**6**
**4**	**Luke Humphries 97.95**	**6**
Damon Heta 90.43	2
**2**	**Gerwyn Price 94.49**	**6**
Josh Rock 96.07	5
**3**	**Luke Littler 100.03**	**6**
Mike De Decker 89.13	2

**Semi-finals** (best of 13 legs); 16 August
Chris Dobey 98.64	4
**4**	**Luke Humphries 102.43**	**7**
2	Gerwyn Price 103.03	2
**3**	**Luke Littler 108.81**	**7**

**Final** (best of 15 legs); 16 August
4	Luke Humphries 102.31	4
**3**	**Luke Littler 115.02**	**8**
