= 2025 Australian Darts Masters =

Darts tournament in Australia

2025 KenoGO Australian Darts Masters

Tournament information
- Dates: 8–9 August 2025
- Venue: WIN Entertainment Centre
- Location: Wollongong, Australia
- Organisation(s): Professional Darts Corporation (PDC)
- Format: Legs
- Prize fund: £100,000
- Winner's share: £30,000
- High checkout: 170 Luke Littler

Champion(s)
- Luke Littler (ENG)

The 2025 Australian Darts Masters (known for sponsorship reasons as the 2025 KenoGO Australian Darts Masters) was the second staging of the professional darts tournament by the Professional Darts Corporation (PDC), and the sixth event in the 2025 World Series of Darts. The tournament featured 16 players (eight elite PDC players and eight Oceania representatives) and was held at the WIN Entertainment Centre in Wollongong, Australia on 8 and 9 August 2025.

Gerwyn Price was the defending champion after defeating Luke Littler 8–1 in the 2024 final. However, he lost 6–4 to Chris Dobey in the quarter-finals.

Littler won the tournament and the third World Series title of his career by defeating Mike De Decker 8–4 in the final.

== Overview ==
=== Format ===
Eight elite PDC representatives were drawn to play eight Oceania representatives in the first round on Friday 8 August; the quarter-finals, semi-finals and final all took place on Saturday 9 August. All matches were in leg play format, with the number of legs required to win increasing as the tournament progressed:

- First round and quarter-finals: Best of eleven legs
- Semi-finals: Best of thirteen legs
- Final: Best of fifteen legs

=== Prize money ===
The winner received £30,000. The total prize fund was £100,000.

Position (no. of players)		Prize money (Total: £100,000)
Winner	(1)	£30,000
Runner-up	(1)	£16,000
Semi-finalists	(2)	£10,000
Quarter-finalists	(4)	£5,000
First round	(8)	£1,750

=== Broadcasts ===
The tournament was broadcast on the PDC's streaming service, PDCTV, in the United Kingdom, with delayed coverage airing on ITV4 and ITVX. Other broadcasters included Fox Sports in Australia; Sky Sport in New Zealand; DAZN in Germany, Austria and Switzerland; Peacock in the United States; FanDuel in the United States and Canada; Viaplay in the Netherlands and Scandinavia; VTM in Belgium; Nova in Czechia and Slovakia; and Sport1 in Hungary. It was also available on PDCTV to international subscribers.

== Qualifiers ==
The PDC announced the first six players participating as their elite representatives on 14 May, with two more players to be confirmed. Michael van Gerwen, Rob Cross and Nathan Aspinall were absent from the lineup due to family reasons. On 15 July, 2025 World Cup winner Josh Rock and 2024 World Grand Prix winner Mike De Decker were announced as the final two PDC representatives, with both making their World Series debut.

The seedings were based on the 2025 World Series rankings after five events:

1. Stephen Bunting (semi-finals)
2. Gerwyn Price (quarter-finals)
3. Luke Humphries (quarter-finals)
4. Luke Littler (champion)
5. Chris Dobey (semi-finals)
6. Damon Heta (quarter-finals)
7. Josh Rock (quarter-finals)
8. Mike De Decker (runner-up)

The first two Oceania representatives announced were Simon Whitlock, who has competed in every World Series event held in Oceania, and Haupai Puha, who is a PDC Tour Card holder. They were joined by five qualifiers from the Dartplayers Australia (DPA) circuit: Joe Comito, Brody Klinge, Tim Pusey, Brandon Weening and James Bailey. A Dartplayers New Zealand (DPNZ) qualifier was held to determine the last Oceania representative, which was won by Jonny Tata. Klinge and Weening made their World Series debuts.

Qualification	Player
Invitees	Simon Whitlock (first round)
PDC Tour Card holders	Haupai Puha (first round)
DPA qualifiers	Joe Comito (first round)
DPA qualifiers	Brody Klinge (first round)
DPA qualifiers	Tim Pusey (first round)
DPA qualifiers	Brandon Weening (first round)
DPA qualifiers	James Bailey (first round)
DPNZ qualifier	Jonny Tata (first round)

== Summary ==
=== First round ===
The first round was played on 8 August. All eight PDC representatives advanced to the quarter-finals. Recently-crowned World Matchplay champion and reigning world champion Luke Littler narrowly defeated New Zealand's Haupai Puha 6–5, avoiding a first defeat in the opening round of a World Series event. Littler missed the bullseye for a 170 checkout to win the match, allowing Puha to level the score at 5–5 and force a deciding leg. Littler secured victory with a 13-dart break of throw to beat the world number 94. Australian number one Damon Heta recorded a three-dart average of 109.98 and produced four ton-plus checkouts – 121, 121, 117 and 104 – in his 6–0 whitewash against James Bailey. Heta stated that he was "forever grateful" for the support from his home crowd. World Series debutants Mike De Decker and Josh Rock both achieved their first wins, with the latter averaging 108.16 on his way to defeating Simon Whitlock 6–1. World number one Luke Humphries overturned a 2–0 deficit against Jonny Tata to triumph 6–4, while Chris Dobey also came back from 4–2 down to beat Tim Pusey 6–4. Defending champion Gerwyn Price and top seed Stephen Bunting also progressed to the next round.

=== Quarter-finals, semi-finals and final ===
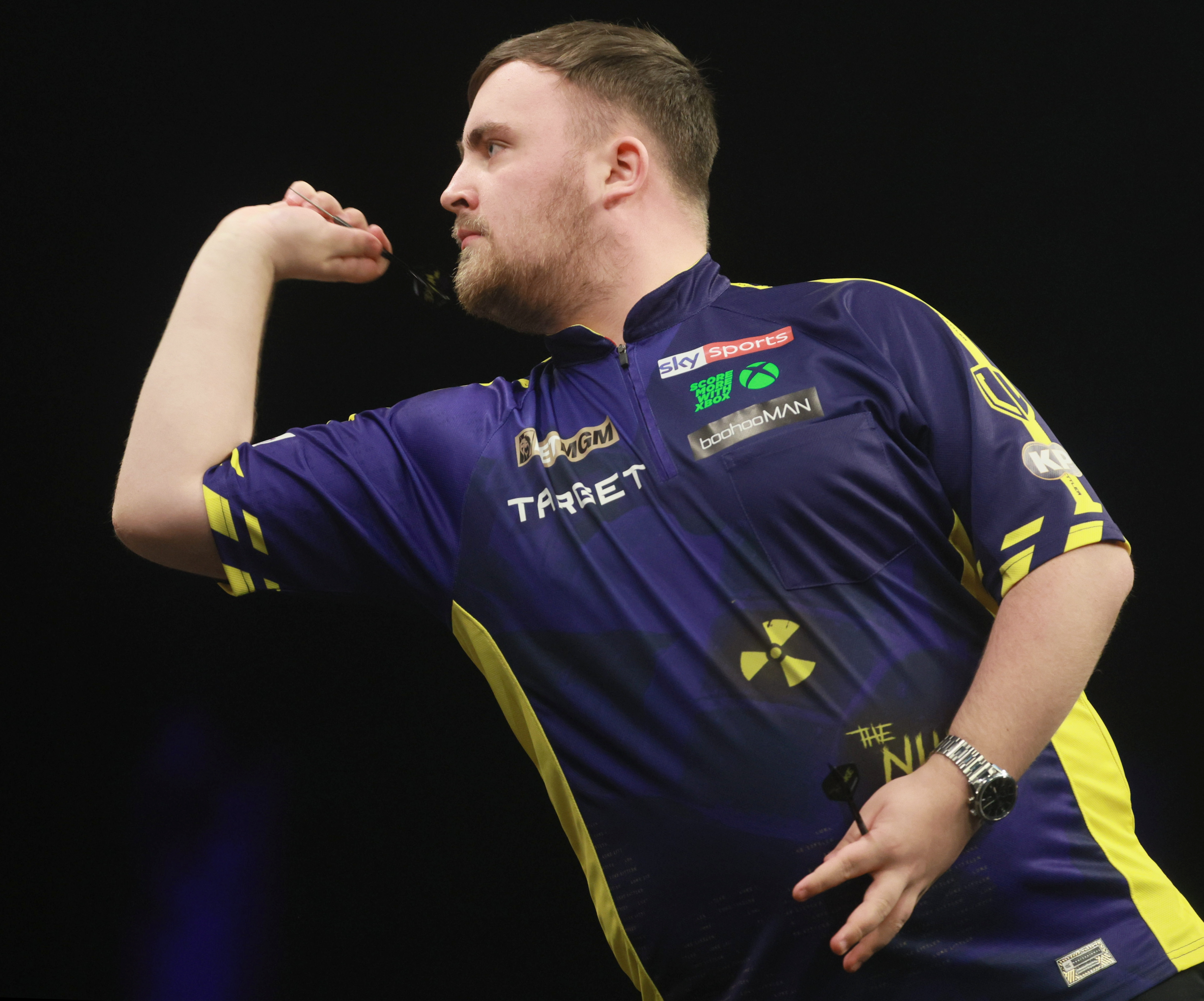
Luke Littler (pictured) won his third World Series of Darts title.

The quarter-finals, semi-finals and final were played on 9 August. Stephen Bunting opened the quarter-finals by whitewashing Josh Rock 6–0, while Luke Littler ended the crowd's hopes for a home winner as he defeated Damon Heta 6–3 – his sixth consecutive win against the Australian. Chris Dobey reached his first World Series semi-final after eliminating defending champion Gerwyn Price 6–4. Mike De Decker also progressed to the semi-finals by whitewashing Luke Humphries, who was playing through an illness. In the semi-finals, Littler achieved the highest checkout of the tournament, a 170 finish, in his 7–4 win against Bunting. De Decker booked his place in the final by defeating Dobey by the same scoreline, setting up a match between De Decker and Littler for the title. Littler looked to better his result at the previous year's event, where he was beaten 8–1 by Price in the final, and also aimed for his first World Series title of the 2025 season, while De Decker looked to win the tournament on debut.

In the final, Littler took a 2–0 lead but De Decker levelled the contest at 2–2. Littler took control of the match by winning the next two legs, pinning a 143 checkout in the first before claiming the second in 11 darts. His Belgian opponent kept within close distance at 6–4 but Littler eventually secured the 8–4 victory, winning six of the last eight legs. Littler averaged 99.10 and threw five scores of 180, bringing his total number of maximums during the tournament to 19. It was his first World Series title of the year and his third overall, after winning the Bahrain Masters and Poland Masters during the 2024 season, in addition to winning the 2024 World Series of Darts Finals. Speaking after the final, Littler admitted that it had "not gone to plan this year in the World Series" but said that it "feels very good" to have "another one [he] can tick off". De Decker joked in defeat that Littler "needs to retire because it’s not fun any more".

== Draw ==
The draw was announced on 7 August. Numbers to the left of players' names show the seedings for the top four in the tournament. The figures to the right of a player's name state their three-dart average in a match. Players in bold denote match winners.

**First round** (best of 11 legs); 8 August
**1**	**Stephen Bunting 101.29**	**6**
Brody Klinge 95.10	1
**Josh Rock 108.16**	**6**
Simon Whitlock 93.26	1
**4**	**Luke Littler 91.80**	**6**
Haupai Puha 88.29	5
**Damon Heta 109.98**	**6**
James Bailey 76.44	0
**2**	**Gerwyn Price 100.45**	**6**
Joe Comito 83.91	3
**Chris Dobey 89.49**	**6**
Tim Pusey 88.60	4
**3**	**Luke Humphries 92.04**	**6**
Jonny Tata 83.85	3
**Mike De Decker 80.33**	**6**
Brandon Weening 75.81	2

**Quarter-finals** (best of 11 legs); 9 August
**1**	**Stephen Bunting 93.94**	**6**
Josh Rock 94.17	0
**4**	**Luke Littler 102.84**	**6**
Damon Heta 95.75	3
2	Gerwyn Price 101.42	4
**Chris Dobey 98.08**	**6**
3	Luke Humphries 91.63	0
**Mike De Decker 103.66**	**6**

**Semi-finals** (best of 13 legs); 9 August
1	Stephen Bunting 102.35	4
**4**	**Luke Littler 98.86**	**7**
Chris Dobey 90.27	4
**Mike De Decker 94.82**	**7**

**Final** (best of 15 legs); 9 August
**4**	**Luke Littler 99.83**	**8**
Mike De Decker 89.66	4
