= 2025 Dutch Darts Masters =

Darts tournament

2025 TOTO Dutch Darts Masters

Tournament information
- Dates: 24–25 January 2025
- Venue: Maaspoort Den Bosch
- Location: 's-Hertogenbosch
- Country: Netherlands
- Organisation(s): Professional Darts Corporation (PDC)
- Format: Legs
- Prize fund: £100,000
- Winner's share: £30,000
- High checkout: 153 Jermaine Wattimena

Champion(s)
- Rob Cross

The 2025 Dutch Darts Masters, known as the 2025 TOTO Dutch Darts Masters for sponsorship reasons, was the third staging of the professional darts tournament by the Professional Darts Corporation and the second event in the 2025 World Series of Darts. The tournament featured 16 players (eight elite PDC players and eight Benelux representatives) and was held at the Maaspoort Den Bosch in 's-Hertogenbosch, Netherlands from 24 to 25 January 2025. The total prize fund was £100,000, with the winner receiving £30,000.

Michael van Gerwen was the defending champion, having defeated Luke Littler 8–6 in the 2024 final. However, he lost to Littler 6–3 in the quarter-finals.

Rob Cross won the tournament, beating Stephen Bunting 8–5 in the final.

== Overview ==
=== Format ===
Eight elite PDC representatives were drawn to play eight Benelux representatives in the first round on Friday 24 January; the quarter-finals, semi-finals and final all took place on Saturday 25 January. All matches were in leg play format, with the number of legs required to win increasing as the tournament progressed:

- First round and quarter-finals: Best of eleven legs
- Semi-finals: Best of thirteen legs
- Final: Best of fifteen legs

=== Prize money ===
The winner received the Toon Greebe Trophy and £30,000. The total prize fund increased from 2024 to £100,000. The breakdown of prize money is shown below:

| Position (no. of players) | | Prize money (Total: £100,000) |
|---|---|---|
| Winner | (1) | £30,000 |
| Runner-up | (1) | £16,000 |
| Semi-finalists | (2) | £10,000 |
| Quarter-finalists | (4) | £5,000 |
| First round | (8) | £1,750 |

=== Broadcasts ===
The tournament was broadcast on ITV4 and ITVX in the United Kingdom. Other broadcasters included DAZN in Germany, Austria and Switzerland; Viaplay in the Netherlands, Iceland, Poland and Scandinavia; TV Nova in the Czech Republic and Slovakia; Fox Sports in Australia; Sky Sport in New Zealand; VTM in Belgium; Sport1 in Hungary and FanDuel in the United States. It was also available on PDCTV to international subscribers.

== Qualifiers ==
The PDC announced the 16-player lineup on 13 January 2025. 2025 PDC World Championship runner-up Michael van Gerwen made his first 2025 World Series appearance after not participating in the Bahrain Darts Masters.

1. Stephen Bunting (runner-up)
2. Gerwyn Price (semi-finals)
3. Luke Humphries (first round)
4. Luke Littler (semi-finals)
5. Chris Dobey (first round)
6. Nathan Aspinall (first round)
7. Rob Cross (champion)
8. Michael van Gerwen (quarter-finals)

The Benelux representatives list consisted of seven Dutch players and Dimitri Van den Bergh as the sole Belgian player, as Belgian World Grand Prix champion Mike De Decker was unable to participate due to family commitments. Richard Veenstra made his debut at the event.

- Danny Noppert (first round)
- Dimitri Van den Bergh (first round)
- Dirk van Duijvenbode (first round)
- Gian van Veen (first round)
- Raymond van Barneveld (quarter-finals)
- Jermaine Wattimena (quarter-finals)
- Kevin Doets (quarter-finals)
- Richard Veenstra (first round)

== Summary ==
=== First round ===
Five of the eight elite PDC representatives were victorious in the first round. Michael van Gerwen competed in his first match since losing the 2025 World Championship final, defeating Dirk van Duijvenbode 6–1. This set up a quarter-final meeting between him and Luke Littler, a rematch of the world final and the 2024 Dutch Darts Masters final – the latter Van Gerwen won 8–6. Littler came out of a closer contest with Dimitri Van den Bergh as a 6–4 winner. Stephen Bunting – the number one seed for the tournament after winning the Bahrain Darts Masters – narrowly defeated Gian van Veen 6–5. Rob Cross opened the session by beating Richard Veenstra 6–3 and Gerwyn Price won 6–2 against Danny Noppert.

The Netherlands' Jermaine Wattimena, Raymond van Barneveld and Kevin Doets successfully reached the second round. Wattimena earned a 6–3 upset victory over world number one Luke Humphries. Van Barneveld capitalised on Chris Dobey missing a match dart by hitting a 144 checkout to win their match 6–5. Van Barneveld stated that he was "over the moon" with the win and that he was looking forward to the following night's action. Doets comfortably beat Nathan Aspinall 6–1 to complete the trio of PDC representative losses.

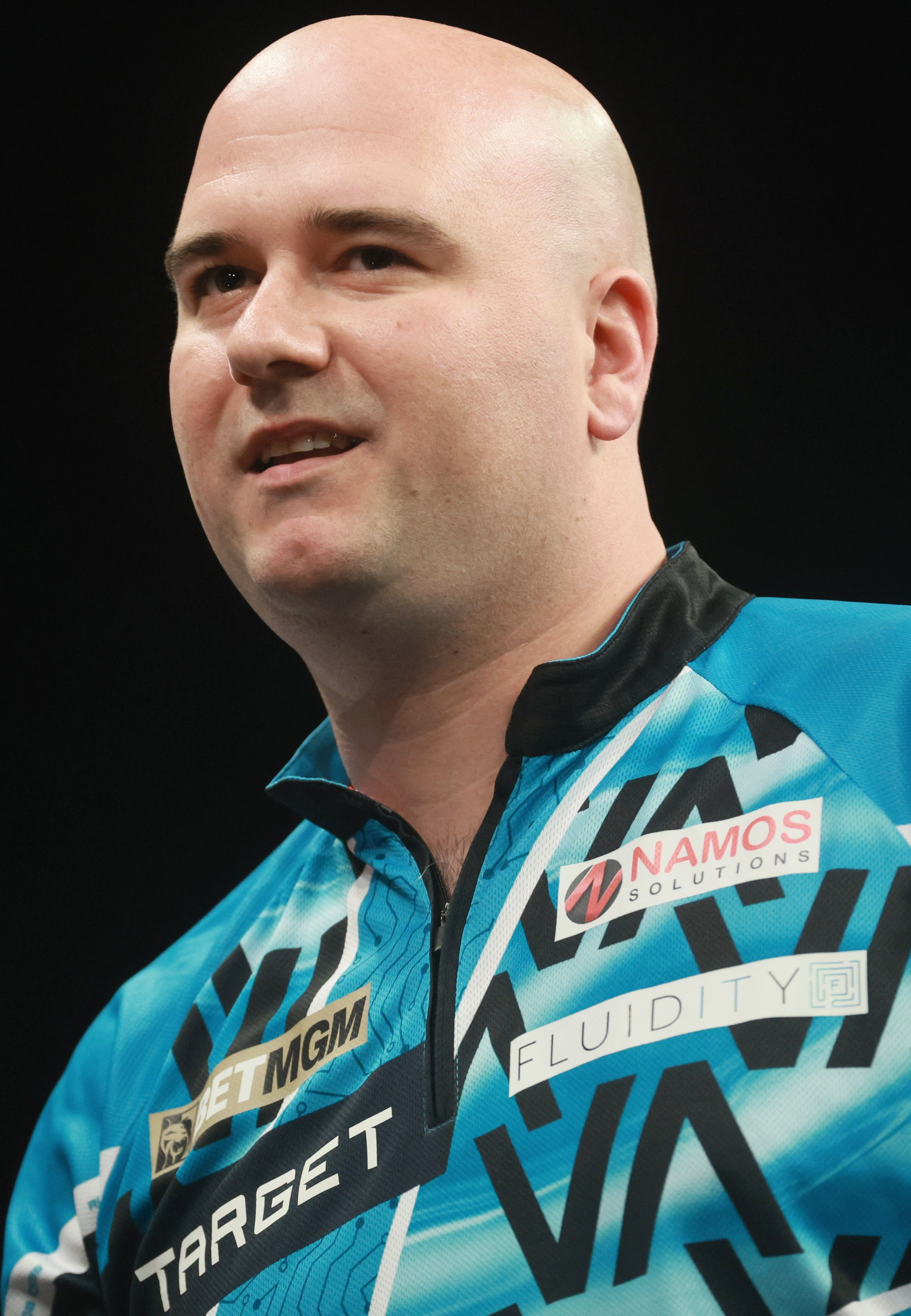
Rob Cross won his fifth World Series of Darts title.

=== Quarter-finals, semi-finals and final ===
In a rematch of the world final, Luke Littler took a 3–0 lead over Michael van Gerwen before Van Gerwen brought the match level at 3–3. However, Littler then won the next three legs to advance to the semi-finals with a 6–3 victory. Gerwyn Price won a last-leg decider against Kevin Doets with a 145 checkout. Stephen Bunting also survived a deciding leg against Raymond van Barneveld, while Rob Cross progressed after beating Jermaine Wattimena 6–3. In the semi-finals, Luke Littler produced a tournament record average of 107.59, but was defeated 7–6 by Stephen Bunting. Rob Cross won 7–3 against Gerwyn Price in the other semi-final, setting up a final between Cross and Bunting.

Cross initially took a 3–1 lead in the final, but Bunting kept the match close and eventually evened the score at 5–5 with a 130 checkout. However, this ended up being the end of Bunting's comeback as Cross won the next three legs, hitting double eight to secure an 8–5 victory and claim the title. This marked Cross' fifth World Series of Darts title, as well as his first World Series title win in Europe. In his post-match interview, Cross showed appreciation for the Dutch crowd and commended Bunting for his performance, calling him a "credit to the sport." He also said, "To come here and win this one means so much. It's been a great weekend and I've really enjoyed it, and I love the World Series." Bunting saw solace in reaching back-to-back World Series finals and expressed that he "[couldn't] wait to continue the form in the World Masters."

== Draw ==
The draw was announced on 23 January. Numbers to the left of players' names show the seedings for the top four in the tournament. The figures to the right of a player's name state their three-dart average in a match. Players in bold denote match winners.

**First round** (best of 11 legs); 24 January
**1** | **Stephen Bunting 102.06** | **6**
Gian van Veen 105.13 | 5
Chris Dobey 94.49 | 5
**Raymond van Barneveld 96.34** | **6**
**4** | **Luke Littler 101.07** | **6**
Dimitri Van den Bergh 88.99 | 4
**Michael van Gerwen 95.53** | **6**
Dirk van Duijvenbode 88.60 | 1
**2** | **Gerwyn Price 101.85** | **6**
Danny Noppert 93.72 | 2
Nathan Aspinall 91.15 | 1
**Kevin Doets 94.79** | **6**
3 | Luke Humphries 91.55 | 3
**Jermaine Wattimena 98.86** | **6**
**Rob Cross 95.27** | **6**
Richard Veenstra 92.42 | 3

**Quarter-finals** (best of 11 legs); 25 January
**1** | **Stephen Bunting 95.32** | **6**
Raymond van Barneveld 88.88 | 5
**4** | **Luke Littler 94.85** | **6**
Michael van Gerwen 90.26 | 3
**2** | **Gerwyn Price 91.75** | **6**
Kevin Doets 84.70 | 5
Jermaine Wattimena 94.48 | 3
**Rob Cross 99.34** | **6**

**Semi-finals** (best of 13 legs); 25 January
**1** | **Stephen Bunting 99.55** | **7**
4 | Luke Littler 107.59 | 6
2 | Gerwyn Price 94.29 | 3
**Rob Cross 100.10** | **7**

**Final** (best of 15 legs); 25 January
1 | Stephen Bunting 96.46 | 5
**Rob Cross 101.87** | **8**
