= 2024 World Series of Darts Finals =

2024 Jack's World Series of Darts Finals

Tournament information
- Dates: 13–15 September 2024
- Venue: AFAS Live
- Location: Amsterdam
- Country: Netherlands
- Organisation(s): PDC
- Format: Legs
- Prize fund: £400,000
- Winner's share: £80,000
- High checkout: 170; Michael van Gerwen; Michael Smith

Champion(s)
- Luke Littler

The 2024 Jack's World Series of Darts Finals was the tenth staging of the World Series of Darts Finals tournament, organised by the Professional Darts Corporation. The tournament took place at AFAS Live, Amsterdam, Netherlands, from 13 to 15 September 2024. It featured a field of 32 players for the first time.

Michael van Gerwen was the defending champion having beaten Nathan Aspinall 11–4 in the 2023 final, but he lost 11–4 to Luke Littler in the semi-finals.

Luke Littler won the title on his debut, after beating Michael Smith 11–4 in the final.

== Prize money ==
The prize money increased compared to the previous edition:

Position (no. of players)		Prize money (Total: £400,000)
Winner	(1)	£80,000
Runner-up	(1)	£40,000
Semi-finalists	(2)	£25,000
Quarter-finalists	(4)	£17,500
Last 16 (second round)	(8)	£10,000
Last 32 (first round)	(16)	£5,000

== Qualification ==
The top eight players from the seven World Series events were seeded for this tournament.

Those events were:

- 2024 Bahrain Darts Masters
- 2024 Dutch Darts Masters
- 2024 US Darts Masters
- 2024 Nordic Darts Masters
- 2024 Poland Darts Masters
- 2024 Australian Darts Masters
- 2024 New Zealand Darts Masters

Additional players were invited by the PDC, with eight players qualifying from a qualifying event for tour card holders on 23 August.

PDC Invited Players
1. Luke Littler (champion)
2. Gerwyn Price (second round)
3. Rob Cross (quarter-finals)
4. Luke Humphries (quarter-finals)
5. Michael van Gerwen (semi-finals)
6. Michael Smith (runner-up)
7. Peter Wright (semi-finals)
8. Dimitri Van den Bergh (first round)

- Damon Heta (second round)
- ~~Nathan Aspinall~~ (withdrew)
- Stephen Bunting (first round)

World Series Order of Merit Qualifiers
- Gian van Veen (first round)
- Boris Krčmar (second round)
- Johan Engström (first round)
- Jeff Smith (second round)
- Kevin Doets (second round)
- Raymond van Barneveld (second round)
- Danny Noppert (second round)
- Haupai Puha (first round)
- Simon Whitlock (first round)

PDC Order of Merit Qualifiers
- Dave Chisnall (first round)
- Jonny Clayton (first round)
- Ross Smith (first round)
- Chris Dobey (quarter-finals)

Tour Card Holder Qualifiers
- Wessel Nijman (second round)
- José de Sousa (first round)
- Keane Barry (first round)
- Gabriel Clemens (first round)
- Cameron Menzies (first round)
- Daryl Gurney (quarter-finals)
- Dirk van Duijvenbode (first round)
- Rhys Griffin (first round)

Reserve List
- Andrew Gilding (first round)

== Draw ==
First round (best of 11 legs); 13–14 September
1	Luke Littler 103.30	6
Ross Smith 97.11	5
Johan Engström 84.77	0
Raymond van Barneveld 95.94	6
8	Dimitri Van den Bergh 91.24	5
Chris Dobey 91.56	6
Boris Krčmar 95.60	6
Stephen Bunting 92.77	4
4	Luke Humphries 101.30	6
Haupai Puha 89.53	3
Gabriel Clemens 97.64	5
Damon Heta 97.20	6
5	Michael van Gerwen 86.26	6
Jonny Clayton 86.14	4
Danny Noppert 98.86	6
Gian van Veen 95.50	3
2	Gerwyn Price 98.62	6
Cameron Menzies 95.92	2
Daryl Gurney 97.22	6
Dirk van Duijvenbode 97.70	4
7	Peter Wright 94.54	6
Dave Chisnall 87.20	1
Rhys Griffin 82.65	4
Jeff Smith 83.91	6
3	Rob Cross 92.65	6
Simon Whitlock 80.10	2
Keane Barry 89.31	0
Kevin Doets 109.98	6
6	Michael Smith 94.58	6
José de Sousa 96.17	5
Wessel Nijman 90.03	6
Alt	Andrew Gilding 88.09	1

Second round (best of 11 legs); 14 September
1	Luke Littler 102.24	6
Raymond van Barneveld 99.56	4
Chris Dobey 103.94	6
Boris Krčmar 101.07	4
4	Luke Humphries 106.09	6
Damon Heta 102.41	5
5	Michael van Gerwen 106.17	6
Danny Noppert 99.93	3
2	Gerwyn Price 90.56	3
Daryl Gurney 96.87	6
7	Peter Wright 95.51	6
Jeff Smith 85.43	2
3	Rob Cross 96.37	6
Kevin Doets 96.99	5
6	Michael Smith 87.60	6
Wessel Nijman 93.23	5

Quarter-finals (best of 19 legs); 15 September
1	Luke Littler 102.91	10
Chris Dobey 100.17	7
4	Luke Humphries 94.06	9
5	Michael van Gerwen 94.41	10
Daryl Gurney 89.10	4
7	Peter Wright 93.31	10
3	Rob Cross 93.53	9
6	Michael Smith 103.02	10

Semi-finals (best of 21 legs); 15 September
1	Luke Littler 107.95	11
5	Michael van Gerwen 99.20	4
7	Peter Wright 94.25	6
6	Michael Smith 96.07	11

Final (best of 21 legs); 15 September
1	Luke Littler 102.21	11
6	Michael Smith 92.97	4
