= 2025 Bahrain Darts Masters =

Darts tournament

Tournament information
- Dates: 16–17 January 2025
- Venue: Bahrain International Circuit
- Location: Sakhir, Bahrain
- Organisation(s): Professional Darts Corporation (PDC)
- Format: Legs
- Prize fund: £100,000
- Winner's share: £30,000
- High checkout: 160; Peter Wright; Luke Humphries

Champion(s)
- Stephen Bunting (ENG)

The 2025 Bahrain Darts Masters was the third staging of the professional darts tournament by the Professional Darts Corporation and was the first event in the 2025 World Series of Darts. The tournament featured 16 players (eight elite PDC players and eight Asian representatives) and was held at the Bahrain International Circuit in Sakhir, Bahrain from 16 to 17 January 2025.

Luke Littler was the defending champion, having defeated Michael van Gerwen 8–5 in the 2024 final. However, he lost to Gerwyn Price 6–2 in the quarter-finals.

Stephen Bunting won the tournament, beating Gerwyn Price 8–4 in the final to claim his first World Series title.

== Overview ==
=== Format ===
Eight elite PDC representatives were drawn to play eight Asian representatives in the first round on Thursday 16 January; the quarter-finals, semi-finals and final all took place on Friday 17 January. All matches were in leg play format, with the number of legs required to win increasing as the tournament progressed:

- First round and quarter-finals: Best of eleven legs
- Semi-finals: Best of thirteen legs
- Final: Best of fifteen legs

=== Prize money ===
The total prize fund was increased from 2024 to £100,000. The winner received £30,000. The breakdown of prize money is shown below:

Position (no. of players)		Prize money (Total: £100,000)
Winner	(1)	£30,000
Runner-up	(1)	£16,000
Semi-finalists	(2)	£10,000
Quarter-finalists	(4)	£5,000
First round	(8)	£1,750

=== Broadcasts ===
The tournament was broadcast on ITV4 and ITVX in the United Kingdom. Other broadcasters included DAZN in Germany, Austria and Switzerland; Viaplay in the Netherlands, Iceland and Scandinavia; TV Nova in the Czech Republic and Slovakia; Fox Sports in Australia; Sky Sport in New Zealand; VTM in Belgium; Sport1 in Hungary and FanDuel in the United States.

== Qualifiers ==
The PDC announced the 16-player line-up on 8 January 2025. Due to family commitments, Michael van Gerwen did not participate in the event. Stephen Bunting and Chris Dobey made their Bahrain Darts Masters debuts.

1. Luke Humphries (semi-finals)
2. Luke Littler (quarter-finals)
3. Rob Cross (first round)
4. Stephen Bunting (champion)
5. Gerwyn Price (runner-up)
6. Chris Dobey (quarter-finals)
7. Nathan Aspinall (quarter-finals)
8. Peter Wright (semi-finals)

The Asian representatives consisted of six invited players, alongside two Bahrain qualifiers that were decided in a qualifying tournament which took place in December 2024. Basem Mahmood and Abdulla Saeed both qualified for their second Bahrain Darts Masters, having previously competed in the 2023 and 2024 editions respectively.

Qualification	Player
Asian Invitees	Lourence Ilagan (first round)
Asian Invitees	Alexis Toylo (first round)
Asian Invitees	Paolo Nebrida (quarter-finals)
Asian Invitees	Xiaochen Zong (first round)
Asian Invitees	Lok Yin Lee (first round)
Asian Invitees	Nitin Kumar (first round)
Bahrain qualifiers	Basem Mahmood (first round)
Bahrain qualifiers	Abdulla Saeed (first round)

== Summary ==
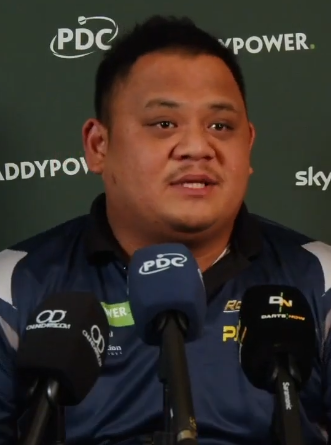
Asian representative Paolo Nebrida defeated Rob Cross in the first round.

=== First round ===
Seven out of the eight elite PDC representatives won their opening match. The only Asian representative to succeed was Paolo Nebrida, who became only the second Asian Tour player and first Filipino player to win a match on the World Series of Darts after a 6–3 upset over Rob Cross. Nebrida commented on his victory, saying: "I felt good but Rob is a tough player. The 116 (checkout) was important and when my first dart goes in, I have a chance." Defending champion Luke Littler played his first match since winning the 2025 PDC World Championship and fended off a potential comeback from Lourence Ilagan to win 6–3.

Luke Humphries hit six-out-of-six doubles as he whitewashed Bahrain's Abdulla Saeed 6–0, including checkouts of 151, 100, and 141. Debutants Stephen Bunting and Chris Dobey progressed as Bunting defeated Nitin Kumar 6–2 and Dobey produced a whitewash win against the other Bahraini qualifier Basem Mahmood. Gerwyn Price, Peter Wright and Nathan Aspinall also advanced.

=== Quarter-finals, semi-finals and final ===
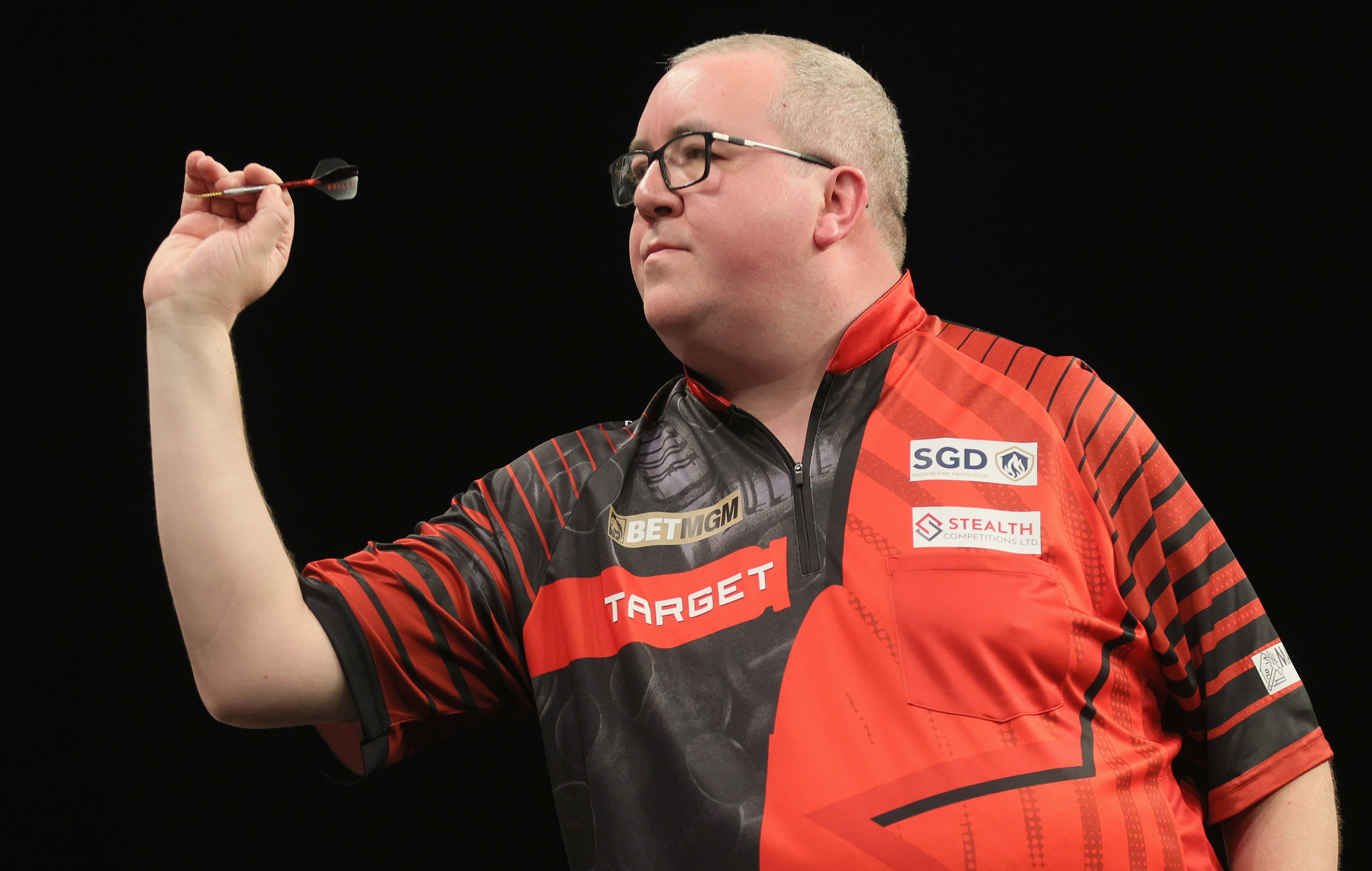
Stephen Bunting won his first World Series of Darts title.

Luke Littler's title defence ended in the quarter-finals, as Gerwyn Price recorded a three-dart average of 115.31 on his way to defeating Littler 6–2; Price also missed double 12 for a nine-dart finish in the sixth leg. Peter Wright progressed to the semi-finals by defeating Paolo Nebrida 6–2, Stephen Bunting whitewashed Chris Dobey and Luke Humphries won a last-leg decider against Nathan Aspinall. In the semi-finals, Bunting beat Humphries in a deciding leg while Price defeated Wright 7–4, setting up a match between Bunting and Price in the first World Series final of the year.

In the final, Bunting began by establishing a 4–1 lead with an 85 checkout on the bullseye, but Price responded by winning the next two legs which included an 85 checkout of his own. Bunting then took the next two legs to lead 6–3. Price only managed to achieve one more leg as Bunting went on to win the final 8–4, claiming his second PDC televised title after winning the 2024 Masters. It also marked Bunting's first World Series title, winning it in his first World Series event in 11 years. With the victory coming shortly after reaching the semi-finals of the 2025 PDC World Championship, Bunting discussed his recent success in his post-match interview with ITV4, stating: "I am playing the best I have ever played. I'm more consistent than ever before and now I'm believing I can win titles." Price commended Bunting for his performance before adding, "I was always chasing the game, but the Premier League is just around the corner, so I think I'll get him back!"

== Draw ==
The draw was announced on 15 January. Numbers to the left of players' names show the seedings for the top four in the tournament. The figures to the right of a player's name state their three-dart average in a match. Players in bold denote match winners.

**First round** (best of 11 legs); 16 January
**1**	**Luke Humphries 103.66**	**6**
Abdulla Saeed 62.30	0
**Nathan Aspinall 95.42**	**6**
Xiaochen Zong 81.47	2
**4**	**Stephen Bunting 95.61**	**6**
Nitin Kumar 92.36	2
**Chris Dobey 93.94**	**6**
Basem Mahmood 76.90	0
**2**	**Luke Littler 94.36**	**6**
Lourence Ilagan 82.50	3
**Gerwyn Price 91.40**	**6**
Lok Yin Lee 83.35	3
3	Rob Cross 86.30	3
**Paolo Nebrida 82.37**	**6**
**Peter Wright 91.87**	**6**
Alexis Toylo 89.50	3

**Quarter-finals** (best of 11 legs); 17 January
**1**	**Luke Humphries 100.47**	**6**
Nathan Aspinall 101.90	5
**4**	**Stephen Bunting 111.33**	**6**
Chris Dobey 84.62	0
2	Luke Littler 105.12	2
**Gerwyn Price 115.31**	**6**
Paolo Nebrida 85.25	4
**Peter Wright 88.54**	**6**

**Semi-finals** (best of 13 legs); 17 January
1	Luke Humphries 94.76	6
**4**	**Stephen Bunting 99.96**	**7**
**Gerwyn Price 92.58**	**7**
Peter Wright 91.15	4

**Final** (best of 15 legs); 17 January
**4**	**Stephen Bunting 99.33**	**8**
Gerwyn Price 96.64	4
