= 2024 Premier League Darts =

Darts competition

2024 BetMGM Premier League Darts

Tournament information
- Dates: 1 February – 23 May 2024
- Nine-dart finish: Gerwyn Price; Luke Littler

Champion(s)
- Luke Littler (ENG)

The 2024 Premier League Darts, also known as the BetMGM Premier League Darts for sponsorship reasons, was a darts tournament, organised by the Professional Darts Corporation – the twentieth edition of the tournament. The event began on Thursday 1 February 2024, at the Cardiff International Arena in Cardiff, and finished with the play-offs, at The O_{2} Arena in London on Thursday 23 May 2024.

Michael van Gerwen was the defending champion, after beating Gerwyn Price 11–5 in the 2023 final. However, he lost 10–5 to Luke Humphries in the semi-finals.

Luke Littler won his first major title and his first Premier League title on debut, beating Humphries 11–7 in the final. He became the youngest player to win a major PDC tournament and hit a nine-dart finish in the final.

On night 10, Gerwyn Price also hit a nine-dart finish during his semi-final match against Michael Smith.

== Format ==
The 2024 Premier League Darts remained an eight-person knockout bracket every night, with each of the seven matches played as the first to six legs. The players were guaranteed to meet each other once in the quarter-finals throughout the first seven weeks, and once in the quarter-finals in weeks 9–15, with weeks 8 and 16 being drawn based on the league standings at that point. Players received two points per semi-final finish, three points per runner-up finish, and five points per final win.

Following the league phase, the top four players in the table contested the two knockout semi-finals with 1st playing 4th and 2nd playing 3rd.

== Venues ==
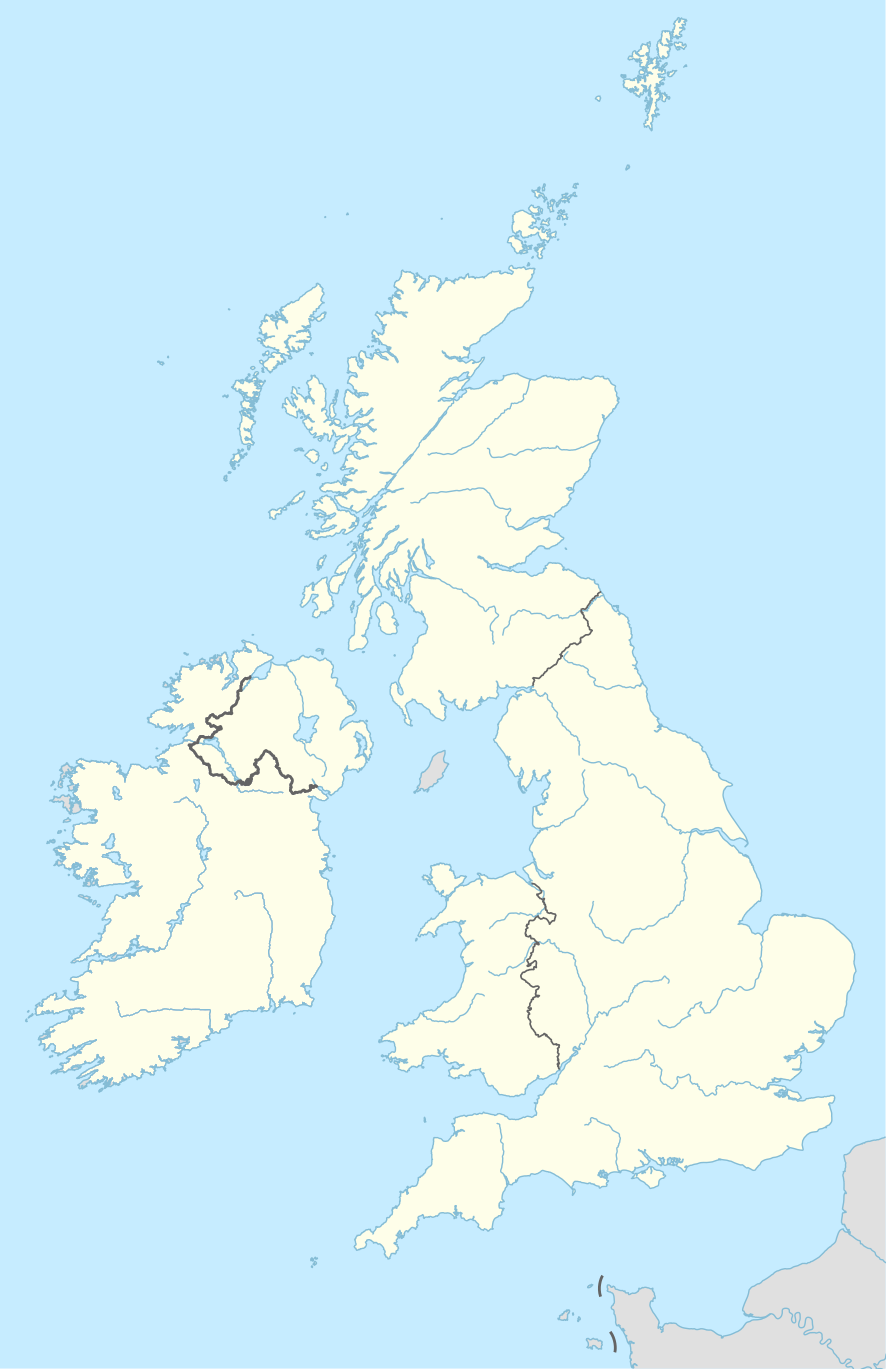
Locations of the 2024 Premier League venues in the UK and Ireland.
Other locations of the 2024 Premier League venues in Europe.

(Wales) Cardiff	(Germany) Berlin	(Scotland) Glasgow	(England) Newcastle
Cardiff International Arena; Thursday 1 February	Mercedes-Benz Arena; Thursday 8 February	OVO Hydro; Thursday 15 February	Newcastle Arena; Thursday 22 February
(England) Exeter	(England) Brighton	(England) Nottingham	(Republic of Ireland) Dublin
Westpoint Exeter; Thursday 29 February	Brighton Centre; Thursday 7 March	Nottingham Arena; Thursday 14 March	3Arena; Thursday 21 March
(Northern Ireland) Belfast	(England) Manchester	(England) Birmingham	(Netherlands) Rotterdam
SSE Arena Belfast; Thursday 28 March	Manchester Arena; Thursday 4 April	Arena Birmingham; Thursday 11 April	Rotterdam Ahoy; Thursday 18 April
(England) Liverpool	(Scotland) Aberdeen	(England) Leeds	(England) Sheffield
Liverpool Arena; Thursday 25 April	P&J Live; Thursday 2 May	Leeds Arena; Thursday 9 May	Sheffield Arena; Thursday 16 May
(England) London
The O_{2} Thursday 23 May

== Prize money ==
The prize money for the 2024 tournament remained at £1 million, including a £10,000 bonus to each night's winner.

Stage	Prize money
Winner	£275,000
Runner-up	£125,000
Semi-finalists (x2)	£85,000
5th place	£75,000
6th place	£70,000
7th place	£65,000
8th place	£60,000
Weekly Winner Bonus (x16)	£10,000
Total	£1,000,000

== Players ==
The format introduced in 2022 continued, which would encompass eight players, each playing against each other in a knockout tournament each night. The winner of each night received an additional £10,000 towards their prize money. Those who make it out of the last 8 each receive 2 points, the runner-up received 3 points and the winner received 5.

The top 4 players on the PDC Order of Merit automatically qualified. The remaining 4 were announced on 4 January 2024.

Player	Appearance in Premier League	Consecutive Streak	Order of Merit Rank on 1 February 2024	Previous best performance
Luke Humphries	1st (Note: Humphries had previously appeared as a one-off challenger in both 2019 and 2020.)	1	1	Debut
Michael van Gerwen	12th	12	2	Winner (2013, 2016, 2017, 2018, 2019, 2022, 2023)
Michael Smith	7th	3	3	Runner-up (2018)
Nathan Aspinall	4th (Note: Aspinall had additionally appeared as a one-off challenger in 2019.)	2	4	Runner-up (2020)
Gerwyn Price	6th	3	5	Runner-up (2023)
Rob Cross	5th	1	6	Runner-up (2019)
Peter Wright	11th	11	8	Runner-up (2017)
Luke Littler	1st	1	31	Debut

== League stage ==
The fixtures were released on 23 January 2024.

=== 1 February – Night 1 ===
(Wales) Cardiff International Arena, Cardiff

Quarter-finals (best of 11 legs)
Peter Wright 83.78	3
Rob Cross 93.65	6
Gerwyn Price 100.24	6
Nathan Aspinall 88.99	4
Michael van Gerwen 97.14	5
Michael Smith 94.13	6
Luke Littler 100.30	6
Luke Humphries 93.26	2

Semi-finals (best of 11 legs)
Rob Cross 97.16	2
Gerwyn Price 101.84	6
Michael Smith 98.04	6
Luke Littler 105.31	5

Final (best of 11 legs)
Gerwyn Price 90.82	2
Michael Smith 98.11	6

Night 1 Statistics
Night's Total Average: 95.91
Highest Checkout: Gerwyn Price 124
Most 180s: Michael Smith 10
Night's 180s: 33

=== 8 February – Night 2 ===
(Germany) Mercedes-Benz Arena, Berlin

Quarter-finals (best of 11 legs)
Nathan Aspinall 93.81	4
Michael van Gerwen 100.30	6
Michael Smith 101.35	6
Gerwyn Price 104.21	5
Luke Littler 104.20	6
Rob Cross 95.20	5
Luke Humphries 103.63	6
Peter Wright 94.19	4

Semi-finals (best of 11 legs)
Michael van Gerwen 107.10	6
Michael Smith 98.17	5
Luke Littler 98.78	6
Luke Humphries 103.86	5

Final (best of 11 legs)
Michael van Gerwen 101.07	6
Luke Littler 100.28	5

Night 2 Statistics
Night's Total Average: 100.44
Highest Checkout: Michael Smith and Gerwyn Price 170
Most 180s: Michael van Gerwen 13
Total 180s: 49

=== 15 February – Night 3 ===
(Scotland) OVO Hydro, Glasgow

Quarter-finals (best of 11 legs)
Rob Cross 90.52	6
Michael Smith 90.36	4
Michael van Gerwen 89.63	6
Peter Wright 86.69	2
Nathan Aspinall 97.13	3
Luke Humphries 105.53	6
Gerwyn Price 96.46	6
Luke Littler 97.04	5

Semi-finals (best of 11 legs)
Rob Cross 94.80	4
Michael van Gerwen 99.04	6
Luke Humphries 100.66	6
Gerwyn Price 97.91	3

Final (best of 11 legs)
Michael van Gerwen 93.85	6
Luke Humphries 101.37	5

Night 3 Statistics
Night's Total Average: 95.79
Highest Checkout: Rob Cross 144
Most 180s: Luke Humphries 13
Total 180s: 50

=== 22 February – Night 4 ===
(England) Newcastle Arena, Newcastle

Quarter-finals (best of 11 legs)
Michael Smith 94.89	5
Nathan Aspinall 87.55	6
Rob Cross 98.51	6
Luke Humphries 102.47	5
Peter Wright 103.37	5
Luke Littler 103.99	6
Gerwyn Price 99.09	4
Michael van Gerwen 107.27	6

Semi-finals (best of 11 legs)
Nathan Aspinall 98.74	6
Rob Cross 98.42	4
Luke Littler 94.15	5
Michael van Gerwen 96.32	6

Final (best of 11 legs)
Nathan Aspinall 100.29	4
Michael van Gerwen 98.78	6

Night 4 Statistics
Night's Total Average: 98.85
Highest Checkout: Luke Littler and Nathan Aspinall 170
Most 180s: Michael van Gerwen and Nathan Aspinall 11
Total 180s: 50

=== 29 February – Night 5 ===
(England) Westpoint Exeter, Exeter

Quarter-finals (best of 11 legs)
Luke Humphries 92.03	6
Michael van Gerwen 93.48	3
Nathan Aspinall 96.08	6
Peter Wright 91.13	4
Gerwyn Price 90.73	1
Rob Cross 109.69	6
Luke Littler 106.97	6
Michael Smith 101.64	2

Semi-finals (best of 11 legs)
Luke Humphries 103.35	5
Nathan Aspinall 97.39	6
Rob Cross 92.65	6
Luke Littler 92.76	3

Final (best of 11 legs)
Nathan Aspinall 95.18	6
Rob Cross 97.82	2

Night 5 Statistics
Night's Total Average: 97.21
Highest Checkout: Gerwyn Price and Nathan Aspinall (x2) 160
Most 180s: Nathan Aspinall 9
Total 180s: 32

=== 7 March – Night 6 ===
(England) Brighton Centre, Brighton

Quarter-finals (best of 11 legs)
Luke Humphries 105.50	6
Gerwyn Price 97.42	2
Rob Cross 97.37	6
Michael van Gerwen 94.83	2
Nathan Aspinall 87.13	3
Luke Littler 93.89	6
Michael Smith 90.07	6
Peter Wright 90.09	5

Semi-finals (best of 11 legs)
Luke Humphries 113.71	6
Rob Cross 108.00	3
Luke Littler 95.27	3
Michael Smith 94.54	6

Final (best of 11 legs)
Luke Humphries 101.04	6
Michael Smith 100.84	3

Night 6 Statistics
Night's Total Average: 97.84
Highest Checkout: Luke Humphries 143
Most 180s: Michael Smith 15
Total 180s: 39

=== 14 March – Night 7 ===
(England) Nottingham Arena, Nottingham

Quarter-finals (best of 11 legs)
Peter Wright 96.69	6
Gerwyn Price 103.33	5
Luke Humphries 103.51	6
Michael Smith 90.31	4
Michael van Gerwen 110.94	2
Luke Littler 114.00	6
Rob Cross 98.92	5
Nathan Aspinall 102.64	6

Semi-finals (best of 11 legs)
Peter Wright 98.87	1
Luke Humphries 106.66	6
Luke Littler 97.10	3
Nathan Aspinall 104.40	6

Final (best of 11 legs)
Luke Humphries 95.53	6
Nathan Aspinall 88.84	3

Night 7 Statistics
Night's Total Average: 100.84
Highest Checkout: Michael Smith 146
Most 180s: Luke Humphries 12
Total 180s: 44

=== 21 March – Night 8 ===
(Republic of Ireland) 3Arena, Dublin

Quarter-finals (best of 11 legs)
1	Luke Humphries 106.09	6
8	Peter Wright 97.72	1
4	Nathan Aspinall 101.40	6
5	Rob Cross 101.66	5
2	Michael van Gerwen 99.20	5
7	Gerwyn Price 102.96	6
3	Luke Littler 97.52	4
6	Michael Smith 99.68	6

Semi-finals (best of 11 legs)
1	Luke Humphries 104.87	6
4	Nathan Aspinall 93.49	4
7	Gerwyn Price 100.40	5
6	Michael Smith 101.18	6

Final (best of 11 legs)
1	Luke Humphries 105.53	6
6	Michael Smith 96.46	2

Night 8 Statistics
Night's Total Average: 100.58
Highest Checkout: Michael van Gerwen 132
Most 180s: Luke Humphries 14
Total 180s: 44

=== 28 March – Night 9 ===
(Northern Ireland) SSE Arena, Belfast

Quarter-finals (best of 11 legs)
Luke Humphries 99.83	5
Luke Littler 102.02	6
Michael Smith 101.31	4
Michael van Gerwen 105.79	6
Nathan Aspinall 94.06	6
Gerwyn Price 99.55	5
Rob Cross 86.29	3
Peter Wright 93.75	6

Semi-finals (best of 11 legs)
Luke Littler 99.05	6
Michael van Gerwen 94.62	3
Nathan Aspinall 93.10	6
Peter Wright 89.34	2

Final (best of 11 legs)
Luke Littler 99.44	6
Nathan Aspinall 97.13	4

Night 9 Statistics
Night's Total Average: 96.81
Highest Checkout: Michael van Gerwen 150
Most 180s: Luke Littler 9
Total 180s: 33

=== 4 April – Night 10 ===
(England) Manchester Arena, Manchester

Quarter-finals (best of 11 legs)
Nathan Aspinall 100.08	6
Rob Cross 94.45	3
Luke Littler 93.15	6
Michael van Gerwen 91.76	3
Michael Smith 100.80	6
Luke Humphries 97.76	3
Gerwyn Price 107.88	6
Peter Wright 109.52	4

Semi-finals (best of 11 legs)
Nathan Aspinall 98.45	4
Luke Littler 97.63	6
Michael Smith 91.21	3
Gerwyn Price 102.88	6

Final (best of 11 legs)
Luke Littler 100.48	6
Gerwyn Price 93.07	3

Night 10 Statistics
Night's Total Average: 98.51
Highest Checkout: Luke Humphries 167
Most 180s: Gerwyn Price 11
Total 180s: 40
Nine-Dart Finish: Gerwyn Price

=== 11 April – Night 11 ===
(England) Arena Birmingham, Birmingham

Quarter-finals (best of 11 legs)
Peter Wright 93.32	4
Luke Humphries 94.87	6
Rob Cross 99.21	5
Luke Littler 97.92	6
Gerwyn Price 103.26	3
Michael Smith 104.45	6
Michael van Gerwen 99.80	6
Nathan Aspinall 95.41	4

Semi-finals (best of 11 legs)
Luke Humphries 94.30	5
Luke Littler 107.23	6
Michael Smith 89.36	4
Michael van Gerwen 93.28	6

Final (best of 11 legs)
Luke Littler 88.12	3
Michael van Gerwen 90.38	6

Night 11 Statistics
Night's Total Average: 96.37
Highest Checkout: Michael van Gerwen 152
Most 180s: Luke Littler 8
Total 180s: 29

=== 18 April – Night 12 ===
(Netherlands) Rotterdam Ahoy, Rotterdam

Quarter-finals (best of 11 legs)
Michael Smith 100.34	6
Luke Littler 102.32	3
Rob Cross 93.60	3
Gerwyn Price 97.87	6
Peter Wright 77.48	2
Nathan Aspinall 93.53	6
Michael van Gerwen 96.54	4
Luke Humphries 100.34	6

Semi-finals (best of 11 legs)
Michael Smith 90.27	6
Gerwyn Price 94.70	5
Nathan Aspinall 97.18	6
Luke Humphries 92.17	4

Final (best of 11 legs)
Michael Smith 96.16	4
Nathan Aspinall 95.55	6

Night 12 Statistics
Night's Total Average: 94.87
Highest Checkout: Michael Smith 170
Most 180s: Michael Smith 11
Total 180s: 44

=== 25 April – Night 13 ===
(England) Liverpool Arena, Liverpool

Quarter-finals (best of 11 legs)
Luke Littler 100.67	6
Gerwyn Price 95.76	3
Luke Humphries 99.38	2
Nathan Aspinall 106.29	6
Peter Wright 98.72	3
Michael van Gerwen 92.51	6
Michael Smith 103.48	4
Rob Cross 102.42	6

Semi-finals (best of 11 legs)
Luke Littler 98.13	6
Nathan Aspinall 94.37	5
Michael van Gerwen 90.00	2
Rob Cross 98.00	6

Final (best of 11 legs)
Luke Littler 105.32	6
Rob Cross 100.08	2

Night 13 Statistics
Night's Total Average: 98.68
Highest Checkout: Michael Smith 138
Most 180s: Luke Littler 8
Total 180s: 30

=== 2 May – Night 14 ===
(Scotland) P&J Live, Aberdeen

Quarter-finals (best of 11 legs)
Peter Wright 92.81	4
Michael Smith 96.31	6
Luke Littler 99.83	6
Nathan Aspinall 92.06	5
Michael van Gerwen 108.33	5
Rob Cross 99.94	6
Gerwyn Price	w/d
Luke Humphries	w/o

Semi-finals (best of 11 legs)
Michael Smith 97.85	1
Luke Littler 110.10	6
Rob Cross 95.39	6
Luke Humphries 94.87	5

Final (best of 11 legs)
Luke Littler 102.38	6
Rob Cross 101.62	4

Night 14 Statistics
Night's Total Average: 98.82
Highest Checkout: Michael Smith 146
Most 180s: Luke Littler 13
Total 180s: 39

=== 9 May – Night 15 ===
(England) Leeds Arena, Leeds

Quarter-finals (best of 11 legs)
Michael van Gerwen 101.70	6
Gerwyn Price 89.93	3
Luke Littler 97.20	6
Peter Wright 82.69	1
Luke Humphries 109.48	6
Rob Cross 96.68	1
Nathan Aspinall 99.00	3
Michael Smith 93.90	6

Semi-finals (best of 11 legs)
Michael van Gerwen 92.89	6
Luke Littler 86.69	1
Luke Humphries 102.84	6
Michael Smith 92.52	1

Final (best of 11 legs)
Michael van Gerwen 92.72	5
Luke Humphries 99.99	6

Night 15 Statistics
Night's Total Average: 95.58
Highest Checkout: Luke Littler 146
Most 180s: Michael van Gerwen and Luke Humphries 11
Total 180s: 39

=== 16 May – Night 16 ===
(England) Sheffield Arena, Sheffield

Quarter-finals (best of 11 legs)
1	Luke Littler 96.93	6
8	Peter Wright 93.36	4
4	Nathan Aspinall 91.82	3
5	Michael Smith 99.27	6
2	Luke Humphries 93.83	6
7	Gerwyn Price 91.19	4
3	Michael van Gerwen 105.70	6
6	Rob Cross 95.57	4

Semi-finals (best of 11 legs)
1	Luke Littler 93.36	5
5	Michael Smith 90.78	6
2	Luke Humphries 104.10	6
3	Michael van Gerwen 101.55	3

Final (best of 11 legs)
5	Michael Smith 100.16	6
2	Luke Humphries 95.36	3

Night 16 Statistics
Night's Total Average: 96.34
Highest Checkout: Luke Humphries 170
Most 180s: Luke Littler and Luke Humphries 9
Night's 180s: 35

== 23 May – Play-offs ==
The top four players of the league stage contest in the play-offs to decide the champion of the Premier League.

(England) The O_{2}, London

	Score	
Semi-finals (best of 19 legs)
Luke Littler 100.30	10–5	Michael Smith 95.17
Luke Humphries 101.71	10–5	Michael van Gerwen 97.18
Final (best of 21 legs)
Luke Littler 105.60	11–7	Luke Humphries 102.47
Night's Total Average: 100.55
Highest Checkout: Luke Littler 144
Most 180s: Luke Littler 14
Night's 180s: 30
Nine-dart finish: Luke Littler

== Standings ==
Five points were awarded for a night win, three points for the runner-up and two points for the losing semi-finalists. When players are tied on points, nights won is used first as a tie-breaker and after that overall matches won.

The top four players after 16 nights advanced to the play-offs.

Pos	Name	Nights					Matches			Legs				Scoring						
Pos	Name	Pts	W	RU	SF	QF	Pld	W	L	LF	LA	LD	LWAT	100+	140+	180	A	HC	CR	C%
1	Luke Littler (C)	40	4	2	7	3	35	23	12	183	153	30	63	359	174	114	99.20	170	183/468	39.10%
2	Luke Humphries (RU)	36	4	2	5	5	33	21	12	169	129	40	66	279	190	107	100.46	170	169/408	41.42%
3	Michael van Gerwen	29	4	1	3	8	29	17	12	144	136	8	53	277	138	79	98.10	152	144/347	41.50%
4	Michael Smith	29	2	3	5	6	31	17	14	148	150	–2	45	299	155	93	96.45	170	148/377	39.26%
5	Nathan Aspinall	25	2	3	3	8	29	15	14	143	139	4	47	315	205	74	95.73	170	143/394	36.29%
6	Rob Cross	17	0	3	4	9	26	10	16	115	130	–15	34	272	164	55	97.38	144	115/280	41.07%
7	Gerwyn Price	12	0	2	3	11	23	7	16	95	122	–27	29	197	144	65	98.41	170	95/234	40.60%
8	Peter Wright	4	0	0	2	14	18	2	16	61	104	–43	18	190	100	43	93.02	156	61/172	35.47%

(C) Champion
(RU) Runner-up
(E) Eliminated
(Q) Qualified

As of 16 May 2024

== Streaks ==
Player	Nights																
Player	1	2	3	4	5	6	7	8	9	10	11	12	13	14	15	16	Play-offs
Luke Littler	SF	RU	QF	SF				QF	W		RU	QF	W		SF		W
Luke Humphries	QF	SF	RU	QF	SF	W			QF		SF		QF	SF	W	RU	RU
Michael van Gerwen	QF	W			QF				SF	QF	W	QF	SF	QF	RU	SF	SF
Michael Smith	W	SF	QF			RU	QF	RU	QF	SF		RU	QF	SF		W	SF
Nathan Aspinall	QF			RU	W	QF	RU	SF	RU	SF	QF	W	SF	QF			DNQ
Rob Cross	SF	QF	SF		RU	SF	QF						RU		QF		DNQ
Gerwyn Price	RU	QF	SF	QF				SF	QF	RU	QF	SF	QF	DNP	QF		DNQ
Peter Wright	QF						SF	QF	SF	QF							DNQ

Legend:	DNQ	Did not qualify	DNP	Did not participate	QF	Lost in Quarterfinals	SF	Semi-finalist	RU	Runner-up	W	Night winner

== Positions by week ==
Player	Nights															
Player	1	2	3	4	5	6	7	8	9	10	11	12	13	14	15	16
Luke Littler	3				2	3		5	2	1		2	1			
Luke Humphries	8	6	4	5	6	2	1			2		1	2			
Michael van Gerwen	5	2	1				2		3	4	3	4			3	
Michael Smith	1		2		5		6	4	5							4
Nathan Aspinall	6	7			4	6	4	3	4	3	4	3			4	5
Rob Cross	4	5	6	4	3	4	5	6				7	6			
Gerwyn Price	2	4	5	6	7							6	7			
Peter Wright	7	8														
