= Luke Littler =

English darts player (born 2007)

Luke Littler MBE
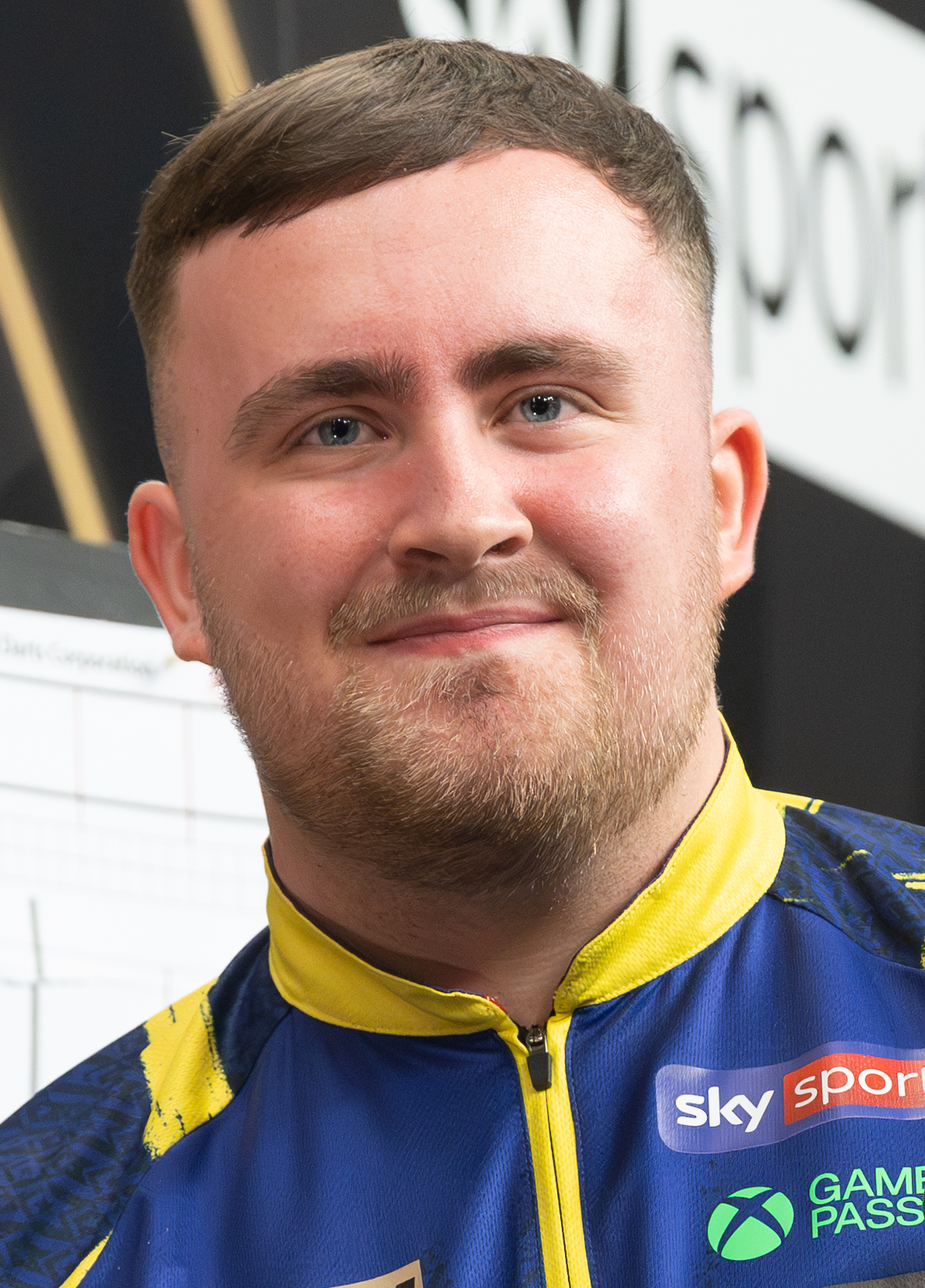
- Littler in 2026

Personal information
- Nickname: The Nuke
- Born: 21 January 2007 (age 19) Warrington, Cheshire, England

Sport
- Sport: Darts
- Darts: 23g Target Signature Gen 1
- Laterality: Right-handed
- Walk-on music: "Greenlight" by Pitbull featuring Flo Rida and LunchMoney Lewis

Organisation (see split in darts)
- BDO: 2019–2020
- PDC: 2023–present (Tour Card: 2024–present)
- WDF: 2019–2023
- Current world ranking: (PDC) 1 (5 November 2026)

WDF major events – best performances
- World Championship: Last 16: 2022
- World Masters: Last 64: 2022

PDC premier events – best performances
- World Championship: Winner (2): 2025, 2026
- World Matchplay: Winner (2): 2025, 2026
- World Grand Prix: Winner (1): 2025
- UK Open: Winner (2): 2025, 2026
- Grand Slam: Winner (2): 2024, 2025
- European Championship: Quarter-final: 2026
- Premier League: Winner (2): 2024, 2026
- PC Finals: Winner (1): 2025
- Masters: Winner (1): 2026
- World Series Finals: Winner (1): 2024

Other tournament wins
- Years
PDC World Cup of Darts (team event)	2026

Other achievements
2023	Televised Performance of the Year
2023, 2024, 2025	Young Player of the Year
2024, 2025	PDC Player of the Year
2024	Best Newcomer
2024, 2025	Fans' Player of the Year
2024	PDPA Players' Player of the Year
Medal record
Men's Darts
Representing England
WDF Europe Cup
Gold medal – first place	2022 Gandía	Men's team
Gold medal – first place	2022 Gandía	Men's overall
WDF Europe Cup Youth
Gold medal – first place	2022 Budapest	Boys singles
Gold medal – first place	2022 Budapest	Boys team
Gold medal – first place	2022 Budapest	Boys overall
Bronze medal – third place	2022 Budapest	Boys pairs

Luke Littler (born 21 January 2007) is an English professional darts player who competes in Professional Darts Corporation (PDC) events, where he is ranked world number one. Nicknamed "the Nuke", Littler has won two PDC World Darts Championships, in 2025 and 2026, and is the youngest world champion in darts history (17 years, 347 days). He has won 14 PDC major singles titles—ranked third all-time—and a total of 30 PDC titles.

Born and raised in Warrington, Littler established himself on the World Darts Federation (WDF) circuit. After winning the 2023 PDC World Youth Championship and five PDC Development Tour titles, Littler made his PDC World Championship debut at the 2024 edition, aged 16; as a 66/1 outsider, he reached the final and was defeated by Luke Humphries. That year, he won his first three PDC major titles, including the Premier League. He defeated Michael van Gerwen to claim his maiden World Championship in 2025, a year where he won six other majors—including his first World Matchplay—and became the youngest world No. 1 in PDC history. He retained his title at the 2026 World Championship, defeating Gian van Veen and becoming the fourth player to win successive PDC world titles. He has won four further major singles titles in 2026, as well as the World Cup of Darts for England, where he teamed with Humphries.

Littler's rise to prominence at age 16 led to an increased public interest in darts, a phenomenon dubbed the "Littler effect" or "Littlermania". He is a two-time PDC Player of the Year and was named BBC Young Sports Personality of the Year in 2024. He was appointed a Member of the Order of the British Empire (MBE) in the 2025 Birthday Honours and featured in Time's list of "The 100 Most Influential People in Sports 2026".

== Early life ==
Luke Littler was born on 21 January 2007 at Warrington Hospital in Warrington, Cheshire, (Note: He has previously been incorrectly reported as being born in Runcorn, where he spent some of his childhood.) the son of candle shop employee Lisa Littler and taxi driver Anthony Buckley. He has two brothers and one sister. He spent the first six years of his life in nearby Runcorn before moving back to Warrington, where he attended Padgate Academy. During childhood, he underwent eye surgery to fix his strabismus.

Littler began playing darts when he was 18 months old, after his father bought him a magnetic dartboard from a pound shop. He has claimed to have scored his first 180 at the age of six and a nine-dart finish at the age of 13. When he was 10, he joined the St Helens Darts Academy and began playing in under-21 leagues. Littler and his father chose his nickname, "the Nuke", during a conversation in a pub, believing it worked well as a rhyme with his first name.

== Career ==
=== Early career ===
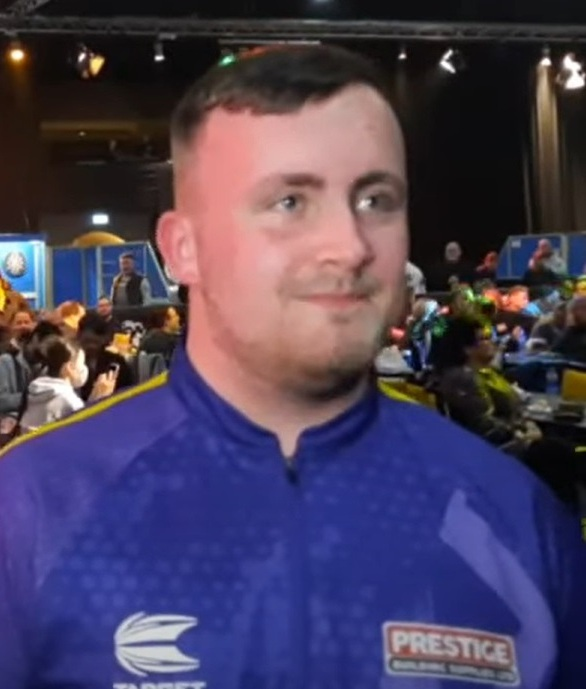
Littler in 2022

In November 2021, Littler won his first seniors title at the Irish Open defeating Barry Copeland 6–2 in legs. This qualified Littler for the 2022 WDF World Darts Championship, at the age of 14. At the end of November, during the JDC MVG Masters tournament, he hit a nine-dart finish.

Littler won the JDC Super 16 in Milton Keynes at the end of January 2022, beating Eleanor Cairns in the final. In March 2022, he won the youth competition at the Isle Of Man Open and advanced to the finals of the Isle of Man Classic. At the 2022 WDF World Darts Championship, Littler started as a seeded player from the second round and won his first match against Ben Hazel 3–2 in sets, becoming the youngest player to win a match at a senior darts world championship. He was then beaten 3–0 in sets by Richard Veenstra, who set a record three-dart average for a World Championship match at the Lakeside.

Littler won the JDC World Darts Championship in London at the end of December 2022, beating Harry Gregory 5–0 in legs.

=== 2023: World youth champion ===
Littler continued to play on the World Darts Federation circuit in 2023. He won the British Classic, whitewashing Carl Wilkinson 5–0 in the final. On the same weekend, he also won the British Open, defeating Peter Jacques 5–2 in the final.

Littler made his debut at a PDC major event at the 2023 UK Open, qualifying for the tournament via an amateur qualifying event organised by Rileys. He reached the fourth round alongside fellow Rileys qualifier Thomas Banks, where he lost to eventual semi-finalist Adam Gawlas 10–8. Also in 2023, Littler won the third and fourth seasons of the MODUS Super Series.

Littler competed in the 2023 PDC Development Tour series. He won five events and finished second on the 2023 Development Tour Order of Merit behind Gian van Veen. On 26 November, Littler beat Van Veen 6–4 in the 2023 PDC World Youth Championship final. The next month, he retained his JDC World Darts Championship title, defeating Álmos Kovács 5–3 in the final.

=== 2024: Breakthrough year ===
Littler made his first PDC World Championship appearance at the 2024 World Championship, qualifying as a result of his placement on the 2023 PDC Development Tour Order of Merit. He started off as an outsider with 66/1 odds. Littler reached the final by defeating former world champion Rob Cross 6–2 in the semi-finals. At 16 years and 347 days old, this made him the youngest player to reach the PDC World Championship final, beating the record previously held by 2008 finalist Kirk Shepherd. Littler faced Luke Humphries in the final on 3 January 2024, taking a 4–2 lead before eventually losing to Humphries 7–4. He earned £200,000 in prize money for his runner-up finish and entered the world's top 32 on the PDC Order of Merit, having started the tournament as the world number 164. Off the back of his World Championship run, it was announced that Littler would take part in the PDC's 2024 World Series of Darts and 2024 Premier League Darts.

Littler made his World Series debut at the Bahrain Darts Masters. He hit his first televised nine-dart finish in his quarter-final win against Nathan Aspinall, becoming the youngest player to do so. He won 8–5 against Michael van Gerwen in the final to capture his first PDC senior title. Competing in the Premier League for the first time, he ended the league phase with four nightly wins to top the table. Littler was matched up against fourth-placed Michael Smith in the semi-finals of the play-offs, winning 10–5 to progress to the Premier League final. After hitting a nine-darter in the 11th leg of the match, he defeated Luke Humphries 11–7 to win his first major title, becoming the youngest player to win a PDC major tournament.

As he had gained a PDC Tour Card, Littler played in his first Players Championship series, winning three titles. Littler also won two titles on the European Tour, hitting a nine-dart finish in his victory at the Belgian Darts Open before adding the Austrian Darts Open title. He won his second World Series title at the Poland Darts Masters by beating Rob Cross 8–3 in the final, before clinching the World Series Finals in September, defeating Michael Smith 11–4 in the final. In November, he defeated Martin Lukeman 16–3 in the Grand Slam of Darts final to secure his first ranking major title and enter the top five in the world on the PDC Order of Merit. Later that month, he faced Luke Humphries in the pair's third major final of the year at the Players Championship Finals, with Littler losing 11–7.

=== 2025: World champion and world number one ===
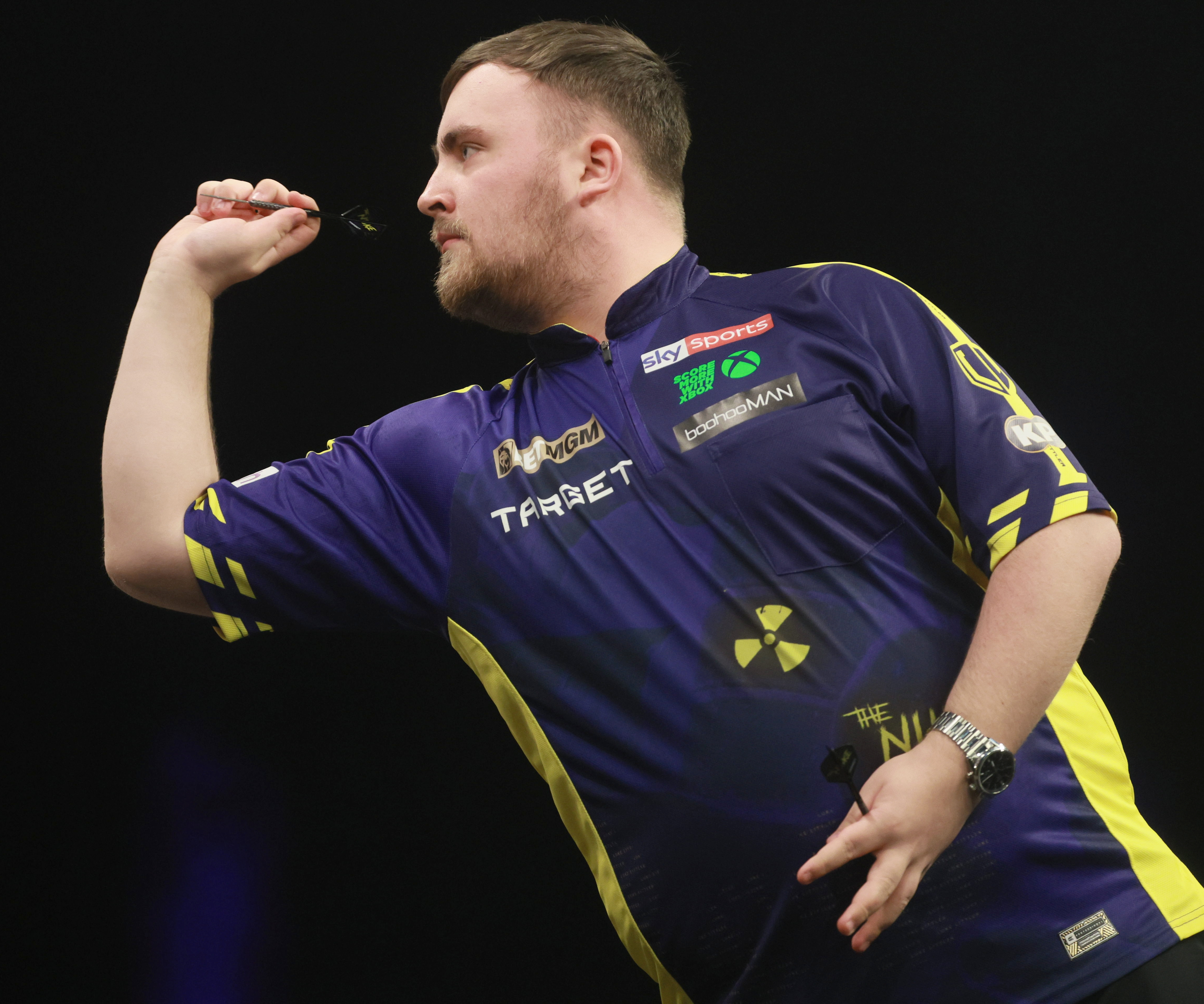
Littler on night nine of the 2025 Premier League

Littler entered the second round of the 2025 World Championship as the fourth seed, where he defeated Ryan Meikle 3–1 in sets. He broke the record for the highest set average in a World Championship match by averaging 140.91 in the fourth and final set. Littler reached the final by defeating Meikle, Ian White, Ryan Joyce, Nathan Aspinall and Stephen Bunting. In the final on 3 January 2025, he defeated three-time world champion Michael van Gerwen 7–3 in sets. Aged 17 years and 347 days, Littler became the youngest world champion in darts history, breaking Jelle Klaasen's record from when he won the 2006 BDO World Championship at age 21. Littler's win saw him earn the £500,000 top prize and surpass Van Gerwen on the PDC Order of Merit to become the world number two, behind Luke Humphries.

In March, Littler won the UK Open for the first time, defeating James Wade 11–2 in the final. He retained his Belgian Darts Open title to win his third European Tour title. On night seven of the 2025 Premier League, Littler hit a nine-dart finish in the final against Michael van Gerwen before winning the match 6–4. He became the first player to record six nightly wins in a single Premier League season after his victory on night 16 and finished the league stage on a record-setting 45 points. On Finals Night on 29 May, he defeated Gerwyn Price 10–7 in the semi-finals before losing 11–8 to Luke Humphries in a rematch of the 2024 final. At the World Matchplay, Littler hit a nine-dart finish in his semi-final match against Josh Rock. In a repeat of their UK Open meeting, Littler defeated Wade 18–13 in the final to win the World Matchplay for the first time. He also became the fifth player to complete the so-called PDC Triple Crown by winning the World Matchplay, the World Championship and the Premier League.

Littler followed his World Matchplay victory by winning back-to-back World Series titles in Australia and New Zealand, as well as a second European Tour title of the year at the Flanders Darts Trophy. At the World Grand Prix, he won his seventh PDC major title by defeating Luke Humphries 6–1 in the final. He won his sole Players Championship title of the year at Players Championship 32, beating Dennie Olde Kalter 8–2 in the final. In November, Littler retained the Grand Slam by defeating Humphries 16–11 in the final. By reaching the final of the tournament, Littler overtook Humphries on the PDC Order of Merit and became the new world number one, the youngest player to achieve the feat. He won his sixth major title of the year at the Players Championship Finals with an 11–8 win against Nathan Aspinall.

=== 2026: Second world title ===
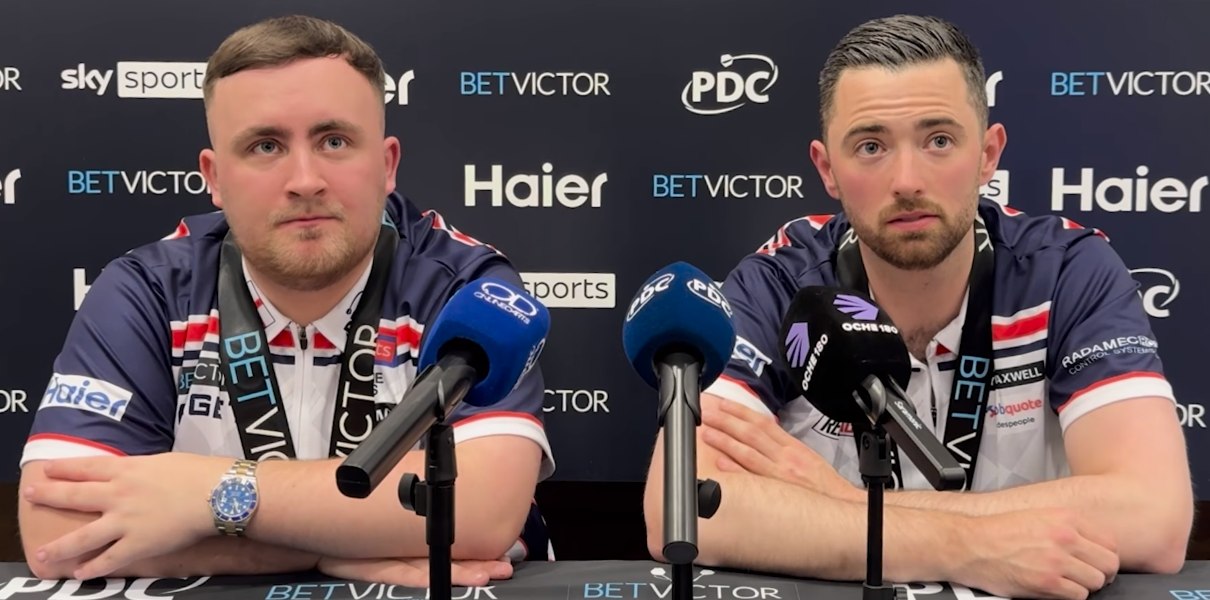
Littler (left) with Luke Humphries after winning the 2026 World Cup of Darts for England

At the 2026 World Championship, Littler won his first three matches without losing a set. Following a 4–2 victory against Rob Cross in the fourth round, he defeated Krzysztof Ratajski 5–0 and Ryan Searle 6–1 to reach his third consecutive World Championship final. In the final, Littler beat Gian van Veen 7–1 to become the fourth player to win back-to-back PDC World Championships, following Phil Taylor, Adrian Lewis and Gary Anderson. Littler was the first recipient of the new, increased £1 million fee for the tournament winner.

Following the World Championship, Littler won the inaugural editions of the Saudi Arabia Darts Masters and Poland Darts Open, as well as his first World Masters and his second UK Open. During the Premier League, he equalled his own record of six nightly wins in a single season, finishing the league stage with 43 points to top the table for the third consecutive year. On Finals Night on 28 May, Littler defeated Gerwyn Price 10–9 and Humphries 11–10 to win his second Premier League title. At the World Cup of Darts, he represented England alongside Humphries for the second consecutive year, with the pair defeating the Netherlands 10–5 in the final to win Littler's first World Cup title and England's record-extending sixth title overall.

Littler hit a nine-dart finish in the opening leg of his second-round victory over Nathan Aspinall at the World Matchplay. He reached the final of the tournament, where he defended his title by defeating Gerwyn Price 18–9. He set new records for the highest tournament average in World Matchplay history (111.04) and the highest average in a World Matchplay final (111.53), both previously held by Phil Taylor. Littler defeated Luke Humphries 8–6 to win his sixth European Tour title at the Czech Darts Open.

== Playing style and equipment ==
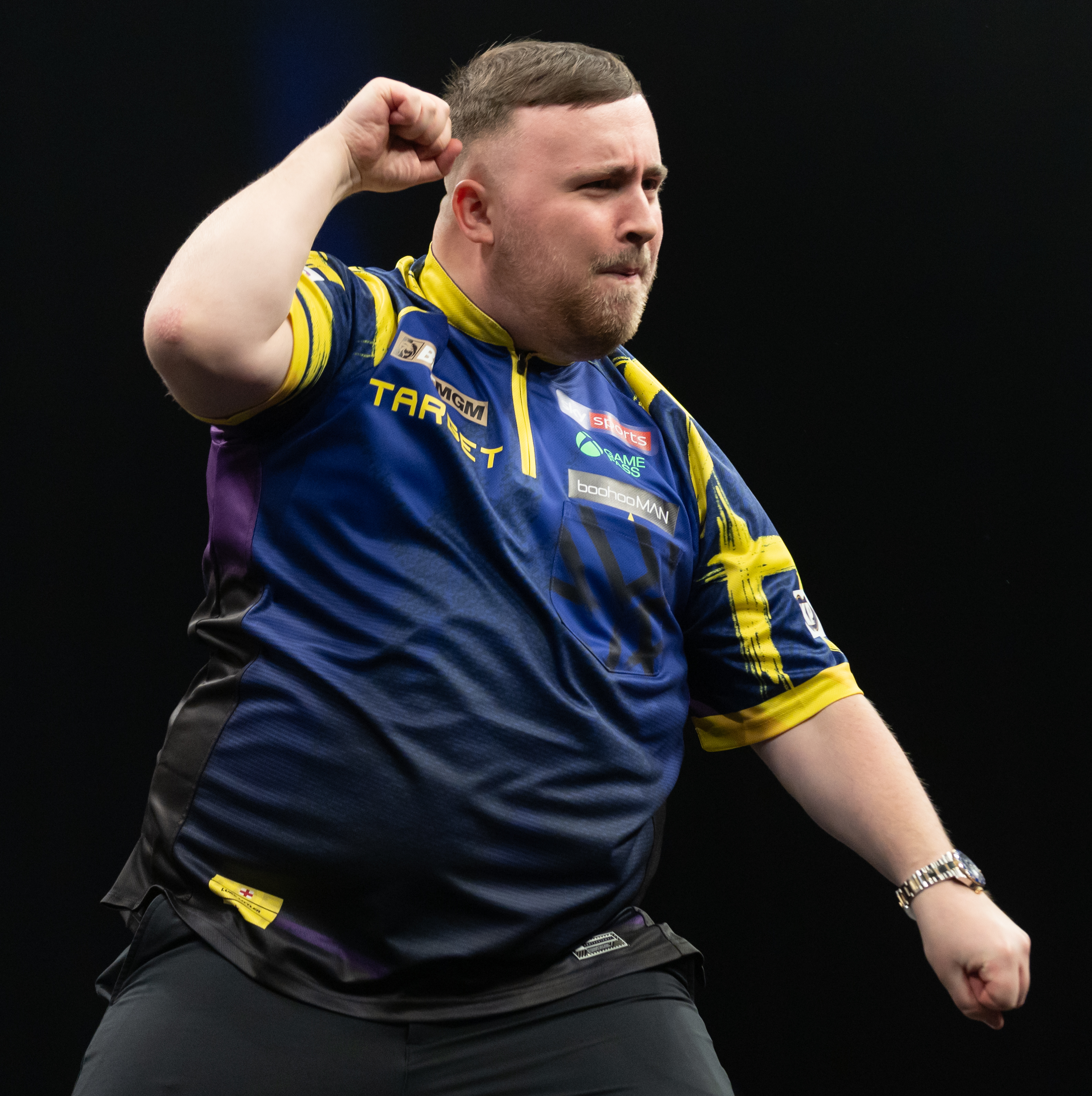
Littler "reeling in the Big Fish" after converting a 170 checkout

Littler has been noted for his calmness and mentality despite his young age, being able to score powerfully and convert high checkouts under pressure. He is known to take alternative and sometimes risky routes for finishes, and frequently experiments with his throwing technique. He is efficient in hitting the double 10 segment of the dartboard, as well as converting the 170 checkout, the highest possible finish in darts, nicknamed the "Big Fish". He has also adopted double 15 as a winning double for his nine-dart finishes.

Using his 23g Gen 1 darts manufactured by Target, his set-up includes characteristically long 45mm points, which leave more space in the board for his darts to group together. He also uses a K-Flex system, a one-piece system for the flight and shaft of the dart that screws into the barrel; James Tattersall, CEO of Target Darts, explained that this reduced the possibility of deflections with other darts upon entering the board.

== Sponsorships and management ==
In February 2024, Littler signed a deal with fashion brand BoohooMAN to allow him to help promote the Motor Neurone Disease Association. He has also been sponsored by Xbox and KP Nuts.

Littler has been sponsored by darts manufacturer Target Darts since he was aged 12. In February 2024, he signed a multi-year professional contract with Target following his first world championship. In October 2025, Littler announced he was now being managed by Target, in addition to the sponsorship agreement, having previously been managed by ZXF Sports Management since 2020.

In January 2026, following his second world championship win, Littler further extended his relationship and sponsorship with Target Darts, signing a new 10-year deal reported as being worth up to £20 million. The agreement is said to cover a range of Littler-branded products and merchandise.

== In popular culture ==
=== Impact on darts ===
"Darts has gone crazy. You wouldn't believe the difference since young Luke came along."

— 16-time darts world champion Phil Taylor on Littler in 2025

Following Littler's unexpected run to the final at the 2024 PDC World Championship, an unprecedented number of new fans began to both play and watch darts, and a record high of 3.7 million viewers watched the 2024 world final. The president of the Professional Darts Corporation, Barry Hearn, attributed this phenomenon to Littler's success and described it as "Littlermania", while others have dubbed it the "[Luke] Littler effect".

Littler was named BBC Young Sports Personality of the Year in 2024, becoming the first darts player to receive the award. He also finished as runner-up for BBC Sports Personality of the Year behind 2024 Summer Olympics gold medalist Keely Hodgkinson. Google revealed that he was the United Kingdom's most searched athlete in 2024, while also placing third in the most searched people category ahead of Keir Starmer and King Charles III. In June 2025, Littler was appointed a Member of the Order of the British Empire (MBE) in the 2025 Birthday Honours for services to darts. He was nominated for Breakthrough of the Year at the 2026 Laureus World Sports Awards and listed in "The 100 Most Influential People in Sports 2026" by Time.

=== Media appearances ===
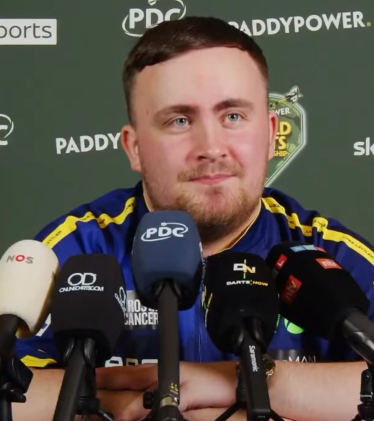
Littler during a press conference at the 2025 World Championship

In March 2024, he made an appearance on the 232nd episode of The Jonathan Ross Show alongside Rob Beckett, Millie Bobby Brown and Raye. He was involved in a darts challenge where he played against Beckett, Brown, and Raye in a three-on-one scoring challenge. The three scored a total of 83, while Littler hit a score of 140. That same month, he made an appearance on Fantasy Football League alongside Stuart Broad. He has appeared on the darts-themed game show Bullseye on two occasions. In July 2026, Netflix announced a new show called Beat Luke Littler, in which 20 amateur darts players were chosen to face Littler consecutively in one-off legs for the chance to win £501,000. The show aired on 30 October 2026, hosted by Gary Lineker and Richard Osman. Littler beat fourteen straight opponents before losing to Fallon Sherrock.

== Personal life ==
Littler is a supporter of football club Manchester United and rugby league club the Warrington Wolves. Littler has paraded his PDC World Championship trophy at Manchester United's Old Trafford following his victories in 2025 and 2026. The Warrington Wolves honoured Littler by renaming their stadium, the Halliwell Jones Stadium, to the Luke Littler Stadium for one night only on 21 February 2025, the date of their opening home match of the 2025 Super League season against the Catalans Dragons.

Littler is friends with Twitch streamer and YouTuber Morgan Burtwistle, better known as Angryginge. Burtwistle has been seen supporting Littler at darts tournaments and the pair have recorded themselves playing matches against each other.

In January 2024, Littler revealed on BBC Radio 1 that he was inspired to choose "Greenlight" by Pitbull featuring Flo Rida and LunchMoney Lewis as his walk-on song after he and his father attended the 2017 WWE event WrestleMania 33, which featured "Greenlight" as its theme song. WWE later invited Littler to their upcoming house show at the O2 Arena in April, which he accepted, and John Cena posted an uncaptioned picture of Littler on his Instagram account after Littler admitted to being a fan. Later that year, he was given a tour of WWE's headquarters Titan Towers, along with Peter Wright by William Regal, ahead of the 2024 US Darts Masters. In addition he also received a personal video message from Cody Rhodes.

In February 2025, Littler was made an honorary citizen of his hometown Warrington by Warrington Borough Council at a ceremony at the Parr Hall to recognise his contribution to the borough and his "outstanding achievements" in the sport of darts. Littler described the accolade as "a real honour". In July 2026, a mural of Littler was unveiled on the side of Golden Square Shopping Centre in Warrington; he attended the unveiling, where he signed the artwork, took photos with fans, and played darts in front of the crowd.

== World Championship results ==
=== WDF World Championship ===
- 2022: Third round (lost to Richard Veenstra 0–3) (sets)

=== PDC World Championship ===
- 2024: Runner-up (lost to Luke Humphries 4–7)
- 2025: Winner (beat Michael van Gerwen 7–3)
- 2026: Winner (beat Gian van Veen 7–1)

== Career finals ==
=== PDC major finals: 18 (14 titles) ===
Legend
World Championship (2–1)
World Matchplay (2–0)
World Grand Prix (1–0)
UK Open (2–0)
Premier League (2–1)
World Series Finals (1–1)
Grand Slam (2–0)
Players Championship Finals (1–1)
World Masters (1–0)

Outcome	No.	Year	Championship	Opponent in the final	Score (Note: (l) = score in legs, (s) = score in sets)	Ref.
Runner-up	1.	2024	World Championship	Luke Humphries	4–7 (s)	
Winner	1.	2024	Premier League Darts	Luke Humphries	11–7 (l)	
Winner	2.	2024	World Series of Darts Finals	Michael Smith	11–4 (l)	
Winner	3.	2024	Grand Slam of Darts	Martin Lukeman	16–3 (l)	
Runner-up	2.	2024	Players Championship Finals	Luke Humphries	7–11 (l)	
Winner	4.	2025	World Championship	Michael van Gerwen	7–3 (s)	
Winner	5.	2025	UK Open	James Wade	11–2 (l)	
Runner-up	3.	2025	Premier League Darts	Luke Humphries	8–11 (l)	
Winner	6.	2025	World Matchplay	James Wade	18–13 (l)	
Runner-up	4.	2025	World Series of Darts Finals	Michael van Gerwen	7–11 (l)	
Winner	7.	2025	World Grand Prix	Luke Humphries	6–1 (s)	
Winner	8.	2025	Grand Slam of Darts (2)	Luke Humphries	16–11 (l)	
Winner	9.	2025	Players Championship Finals	Nathan Aspinall	11–8 (l)	
Winner	10.	2026	World Championship (2)	Gian van Veen	7–1 (s)	
Winner	11.	2026	World Masters	Luke Humphries	6–5 (s)	
Winner	12.	2026	UK Open (2)	James Wade	11–7 (l)	
Winner	13.	2026	Premier League Darts (2)	Luke Humphries	11–10 (l)	
Winner	14.	2026	World Matchplay (2)	Gerwyn Price	18–9 (l)	

=== PDC World Series finals: 8 (5 titles) ===
Outcome	No.	Year	Championship	Opponent in the final	Score	Ref.
Winner	1.	2024	Bahrain Darts Masters	Michael van Gerwen	8–5 (l)	
Runner-up	1.	2024	Dutch Darts Masters	Michael van Gerwen	6–8 (l)	
Winner	2.	2024	Poland Darts Masters	Rob Cross	8–3 (l)	
Runner-up	2.	2024	Australian Darts Masters	Gerwyn Price	1–8 (l)	
Winner	3.	2025	Australian Darts Masters	Mike De Decker	8–4 (l)	
Winner	4.	2025	New Zealand Darts Masters	Luke Humphries	8–4 (l)	
Winner	5.	2026	Saudi Arabia Darts Masters	Michael van Gerwen	8–5 (l)	
Runner-up	3.	2026	US Darts Masters	Luke Humphries	7–8 (l)	

=== PDC team finals: 1 (1 title) ===
Outcome	No.	Year	Championship	Team	Teammate	Opponents in the final	Score
Winner	1.	2026	World Cup of Darts	England	Luke Humphries	Netherlands – Gian van Veen and Michael van Gerwen	10–5 (l)

== Performance timeline ==
Luke Littler's performance timeline is as follows:

=== WDF ===
Tournament	2022	2023
WDF Ranked major/platinum events
World Championship	3R	WD (Note: Before the start of the 2023 WDF World Championship Littler had to choose between playing in the former or the 2024 PDC World Championship. He chose the latter.)
World Masters	3R	NH

=== PDC ===
Tournament	2023	2024	2025	2026
PDC Ranked televised events
World Championship	DNQ	F	W	W
World Masters (Note: A non-ranked event until 2025)	DNQ		QF	W
UK Open	4R	QF	W	W
World Matchplay	DNQ	1R	W	W
World Grand Prix	DNQ	1R	W	1R
European Championship	DNQ	1R	2R	QF
Grand Slam	DNQ	W	W	2R
Players Championship Finals	DNQ	F	W	DNQ
PDC Non-ranked televised events
Premier League	DNP	W	F	W
World Cup	DNQ		2R	W
World Series Finals	DNP	W	F	QF
World Youth Championship	W	DNP	SF	SF
Career statistics
Season-end ranking (PDC)	31	2	1	1

==== Premier League ====
Season	1	2	3	4	5	6	7	8	9	10	11	12	13	14	15	16	F
2024	CAR; SF	BER; F	GLA; QF	NEW; SF	EXE; SF	BRI; SF	NOT; SF	DUB; QF	BEL; W	MAN; W	BIR; F	ROT; QF	LIV; W	ABD; W	LEE; SF	SHF; SF	LON; W
2025	BEL; QF	GLA; W	DUB; QF	EXE; F	BRI; W	NOT; F	CAR; W	NEW; W	BER; QF	MAN; SF	ROT; SF	LIV; QF	BIR; W	LEE; F	ABD; SF	SHF; W	LON; F
2026	NEW; QF	ANT; SF	GLA; SF	BEL; QF	CAR; W	NOT; SF	DUB; W	BER; W	MAN; QF	BRI; QF	ROT; F	LIV; W	ABD; W	LEE; W	BIR; SF	SHF; SF	LON; W

==== European Tour ====
Season	1	2	3	4	5	6	7	8	9	10	11	12	13	14	15
2024	BDO; W	DNQ		EDG; 2R	ADO; W	BSD; 1R	DDC; DNQ	EDO; WD	GDC; F	FDT; 3R	HDT; WD	SDT; 3R	CDO; SF		
2025	BDO; W	DNP		GDG; SF	DNP					FDT; W	CDO; 3R	HDT; SF	SDT; DNP	GDC; WD	
2026	PDO; W	EDT; DNP	BDO; 3R	Did not participate								CDO; W	FDT; WD	DNP	

==== Players Championships ====
Season	1	2	3	4	5	6	7	8	9	10	11	12	13	14	15	16	17	18	19	20	21	22	23	24	25	26	27	28	29	30	31	32	33	34
2024	WIG; W	WIG; 2R	LEI; QF	LEI; 1R	HIL; DNP		LEI; 4R	LEI; 3R	HIL; DNP				MIL; 1R	MIL; 2R	MIL; W	MIL; 3R	MIL; DNP			WIG; W	WIG; 4R	LEI; DNP		WIG; SF	WIG; QF	WIG; 4R	WIG; 2R	WIG; 2R	LEI; DNP		Not held			
2025	WIG; 3R	WIG; QF	ROS; DNP		LEI; SF	LEI; 2R	HIL; DNP		LEI; 3R	LEI; QF	LEI; 1R	LEI; 4R	Did not participate											MIL; 4R	Did not participate						WIG; 1R	WIG; W	WIG; DNP	WIG; 3R
2026	Did not participate																										LEI; QF	LEI; SF	Did not participate					

==== World Series ====
Tournament	2024	2025	2026
Bahrain Masters	W	QF	QF
Dutch Masters	F	SF	NH
US Masters	SF	QF	F
Nordic Masters	DNP	QF	SF
Poland Masters	W	SF	NH
Australian Masters	F	W	DNP
New Zealand Masters	SF	W	DNP
Saudi Masters	NH		W

==== Development Tour ====
Season	1	2	3	4	5	6	7	8	9	10	11	12	13	14	15	16	17	18	19	20	21	22	23	24
2023	MIL; QF	MIL; F	MIL; W	MIL; QF	MIL; W	WIG; QF	WIG; 4R	WIG; QF	WIG; 4R	WIG; QF	HIL; QF	HIL; 4R	HIL; 6R	HIL; 5R	HIL; 3R	LEI; W	LEI; 5R	LEI; QF	LEI; 1R	LEI; W	MIL; 4R	MIL; QF	MIL; F	MIL; W

Performance Table Legend
W	Won the tournament	F	Finalist	SF	Semifinalist	QF	Quarterfinalist	#R; RR; Prel.	Lost in # round Round-robin; Preliminary round	DQ	Disqualified
DNQ	Did not qualify	DNP	Did not participate	WD	Withdrew	NH	Tournament not held	#R; RR; Prel.	Lost in # round Round-robin; Preliminary round	NYF	Not yet founded

== Titles ==
The following is a list of titles won by Luke Littler in his career.

=== PDC titles ===
- Majors (14)
  - 2024 (×3): Premier League, World Series Finals Grand Slam
  - 2025 (×6): World Championship, UK Open, World Matchplay, World Grand Prix, Grand Slam, Players Championship Finals
  - 2026 (×5): World Championship, World Masters, UK Open, Premier League, World Matchplay
- World Cup (1)
  - 2026
- World Series (5)
  - 2024 (×2): Bahrain, Poland
  - 2025 (×2): Australia, New Zealand
  - 2026 (×1): Saudi Arabia
- Pro Tour (10)
  - European Tour (6)
    - 2024 (×2): Belgian, Austrian
    - 2025 (×2): Belgian, Flanders
    - 2026 (×2): Poland, Czech
  - Players Championships (4)
    - 2024 (×3): 1, 15, 20
    - 2025 (×1): 32

==== Youth titles ====
- Development Tour (5)
  - 2023 (×5): 3, 5, 16, 20, 24
- World Youth Championship (1)
  - 2023

=== WDF titles ===
==== Senior titles ====
Gold ranked

- 2021 Irish Open
- 2022 Welsh Open

Silver ranked

- 2023:
  - British Classic, British Open
  - Gibraltar Open
  - Isle of Man Classic

Bronze ranked

- 2022 Romanian Classic

Non-ranked

- 2022 British Internationals

=== MODUS Super Series ===
Sources:

- Champions Week (x2)
  - Series 3
  - Series 4
- Weekly Winner (x2)
  - Series 3 – Week 10
  - Series 4 – Week 7

== Nine-dart finishes ==
Luke Littler's televised nine-dart finishes
Date	Opponent	Tournament	Method	Ref.
19 January 2024	Nathan Aspinall	2024 Bahrain Darts Masters	3 x T20; 3 x T20; T20, T19, D12	
10 March 2024	Rob Cross	2024 Belgian Darts Open	2 x T20, T19; 3 x T20; 2 x T20, D12	
23 May 2024	Luke Humphries	2024 Premier League Darts	3 x T20; 3 x T20; T20, T19, D12	
20 March 2025	Michael van Gerwen	2025 Premier League Darts	3 x T20; 3 x T20, T20, T17, D15	
26 July 2025	Josh Rock	2025 World Matchplay	3 x T20; 3 x T20, T20, T17, D15	
21 July 2026	Nathan Aspinall	2026 World Matchplay	3 x T20; 3 x T20, T20, T17, D15	

== Notes ==
Performance
