= 2024 World Series of Darts =

Darts tournament

The 2024 World Series of Darts was a series of televised darts tournaments organised by the Professional Darts Corporation. Seven World Series events were held followed by one finals event, which like the previous year took place in Amsterdam, Netherlands.

Two new venues made their debuts with Maaspoort hosting the Dutch Masters and the Gliwice Arena hosting the Poland Masters for the first time.

== Prize money ==
International events
Stage	Prize money
Winner	£20,000
Runner-up	£10,000
Semi-finals	£5,000
Quarter-finals	£2,500
First round	£1,250
Total	£60,000

Finals
Stage	Prize money
Winner	£80,000
Runner-up	£40,000
Semi-finals	£25,000
Quarter-finals	£17,500
Second round	£10,000
First round	£5,000
Total	£400,000

== World Series events ==
The 2024 World Series of Darts schedule was announced on 5 December 2023.

No.	Date	Event	Venue	Champion	Legs	Runner-up	Ref
1	18–19 January	Bahrain Masters	Sakhir, Bahrain International Circuit	Luke Littler	8–5	Michael van Gerwen	
2	26–27 January	Dutch Masters	(Netherlands) Den Bosch, Maaspoort	Michael van Gerwen	8–6	Luke Littler	
3	31 May–2 June	US Masters	(United States) New York City, The Theater	Rob Cross	8–7	Gerwyn Price	
4	7–8 June	Nordic Masters	(Denmark) Copenhagen, Forum Copenhagen	Gerwyn Price	8–5	Rob Cross	
5	14–15 June	Poland Masters	(Poland) Gliwice, Gliwice Arena	Luke Littler	8–3	Rob Cross	
6	9–10 August	Australian Masters	(Australia) Wollongong, WIN Entertainment Centre	Gerwyn Price	8–1	Luke Littler	
7	16–17 August	New Zealand Masters	(New Zealand) Hamilton, Globox Arena	Luke Humphries	8–2	Damon Heta	
8	13–15 September	World Series of Darts Finals	(Netherlands) Amsterdam, AFAS Live	Luke Littler	11–4	Michael Smith	

== Top averages ==
The table lists all players who achieved an average of at least 100 in a match. In the case one player has multiple records, this is indicated by the number in brackets.

#	Player	Round	Average	Event	Result
1	Kevin Doets	1st Round	109.98	(Netherlands) World Series Finals	Won
1	Michael van Gerwen	Quarter Final	109.98	Poland Masters	Won
3	Peter Wright	Quarter Final	109.73	Poland Masters	Lost
4	Rob Cross	1st Round	108.19	(Denmark) Nordic Masters	Won
5	Luke Littler	Semi Final	107.95	(Netherlands) World Series Finals	Won
6	Luke Littler (2)	Final	106.71	(Netherlands) Dutch Masters	Won
7	Rob Cross (2)	Semi Final	106.68	Poland Masters	Won
8	Michael van Gerwen (2)	2nd Round	106.17	(Netherlands) World Series Finals	Won
9	Luke Humphries	2nd Round	106.09	(Netherlands) World Series Finals	Won
9	Michael van Gerwen (3)	1st Round	106.09	Bahrain Masters	Won
11	Michael van Gerwen (4)	Quarter Final	105.97	Bahrain Masters	Won
12	Gerwyn Price	Quarter Final	104.97	(Denmark) Nordic Masters	Won
13	Luke Littler (3)	Semi Final	104.92	(Australia) Australian Masters	Won
14	Luke Littler (4)	Semi Final	104.59	(United States) US Masters	Lost
15	Gerwyn Price (2)	Quarter Final	104.52	(United States) US Masters	Won
16	Luke Littler (5)	Quarter Final	104.50	Bahrain Masters	Won
17	Luke Littler (6)	Quarter Final	104.07	(United States) US Masters	Won
18	Luke Littler (7)	Quarter Final	104.03	(Australia) Australian Masters	Won
19	Chris Dobey	2nd Round	103.94	(Netherlands) World Series Finals	Won
20	Luke Littler (8)	Quarter Final	103.78	New Zealand Masters	Won
21	Luke Littler (9)	1st Round	103.66	(United States) US Masters	Won
22	Gerwyn Price (2)	1st Round	103.43	(Netherlands) Dutch Masters	Won
23	Peter Wright (2)	Quarter Final	103.36	New Zealand Masters	Won
24	Luke Littler (10)	1st Round	103.20	(Netherlands) World Series Finals	Won
25	Dimitri Van den Bergh	Quarter Final	103.19	(Australia) Australian Masters	Won
26	Michael Smith	Quarter Final	103.02	(Netherlands) World Series Finals	Won
27	Luke Littler (11)	Quarter Final	102.91	(Netherlands) World Series Finals	Won
28	Gerwyn Price (2)	1st Round	102.73	(Denmark) Nordic Masters	Won
29	Rob Cross (3)	Quarter Final	102.61	(Denmark) Nordic Masters	Won
30	Michael Smith (2)	1st Round	102.56	(Denmark) Nordic Masters	Won
31	Dimitri Van den Bergh (2)	1st Round	102.43	(Netherlands) Dutch Masters	Lost
32	Damon Heta	2nd Round	102.41	(Netherlands) World Series Finals	Lost
33	Jeffrey de Graaf	1st Round	102.25	(Denmark) Nordic Masters	Lost
34	Luke Littler (12)	1st Round	102.24	New Zealand Masters	Won
34	Luke Littler (13)	2nd Round	102.24	(Netherlands) [World Series Finals]	Won
36	Dimitri Van den Bergh (3)	Semi Final	102.22	(Australia) Australian Masters	Lost
37	Luke Littler (14)	Final	102.21	(Netherlands) World Series Finals	Won
37	Luke Humphries (2)	Final	102.21	New Zealand Masters	Won
39	Luke Littler (15)	Final	101.84	Poland Masters	Won
40	Michael Smith (3)	Semi Final	101.53	Poland Masters	Lost
41	Luke Humphries (3)	1st Round	101.30	(Netherlands) World Series Finals	Won
42	Michael Smith (4)	Quarter Final	101.29	New Zealand Masters	Won
43	Michael van Gerwen (5)	Quarter Final	101.15	(Netherlands) Dutch Masters	Won
44	Luke Littler (16)	Semi Final	101.13	Poland Masters	Won
45	Boris Krčmar	2nd Round	101.07	(Netherlands) World Series Finals	Lost
46	Luke Humphries (4)	Semi Final	101.04	(Denmark) Nordic Masters	Lost
47	Gian van Veen	Quarter Final	100.92	(Netherlands) Dutch Masters	Won
48	Michael van Gerwen (6)	Final	100.59	(Netherlands) Dutch Masters	Lost
49	Stephen Bunting	Quarter Final	100.56	(Denmark) Nordic Masters	Lost
50	Nathan Aspinall	Quarter Final	100.48	Bahrain Masters	Lost
51	Luke Humphries (5)	1st Round	100.20	(Denmark) Nordic Masters	Won
52	Rob Cross (4)	Semi Final	100.19	(Denmark) Nordic Masters	Won
53	Chris Dobey (2)	Quarter Final	100.07	(Netherlands) World Series Finals	Lost
54	Gerwyn Price (2)	Semi Final	100.05	(United States) US Masters	Won
55	Michael van Gerwen (7)	Semi Final	100.02	Bahrain Masters	Won
56	Luke Humphries (6)	Quarter Final	100.01	(United States) US Masters	Won
