= 2024 Dutch Darts Masters =

2024 TOTO Dutch Darts Masters

Tournament information
- Dates: 26–27 January 2024
- Venue: Maaspoort Den Bosch
- Location: 's-Hertogenbosch
- Country: Netherlands
- Organisation(s): PDC
- Format: Legs
- Prize fund: £60,000
- Winner's share: £20,000
- High checkout: 150 Luke Littler

Champion(s)
- Michael van Gerwen

The 2024 TOTO Dutch Darts Masters was a professional darts tournament that was held at the Maaspoort Den Bosch in 's-Hertogenbosch, Netherlands from 26–27 January 2024. It was the second staging of the tournament by the Professional Darts Corporation after the inaugural 2022 event, returning after a one-year absence. It was the second event in the 2024 World Series of Darts. The tournament featured 16 players (eight top-ranking players and eight Benelux representatives).

Dimitri Van den Bergh was the defending champion, having defeated Dirk van Duijvenbode 8–2 in the 2022 final. However, he was eliminated in the first round, losing 3–6 to Gerwyn Price.

Michael van Gerwen won the title after defeating Luke Littler 8–6 in the final.

== Prize money ==
The total prize fund was £60,000. The winner received the Toon Greebe Trophy and £20,000.

Position (no. of players)		Prize money (Total: £60,000)
Winner	(1)	£20,000
Runner-up	(1)	£10,000
Semi-finalists	(2)	£5,000
Quarter-finalists	(4)	£2,500
First round	(8)	£1,250

== Qualifiers ==
The 16-player field was announced on 8 January 2024. Luke Littler was seeded number one after his win at the Bahrain Darts Masters. Bahrain Masters runner-up Michael van Gerwen and semi-finalists Michael Smith and Gerwyn Price were also seeded into the bracket.

1. Luke Littler (runner-up)
2. Michael van Gerwen (champion)
3. Michael Smith (first round)
4. Gerwyn Price (semi-finals)
5. Luke Humphries (quarter-finals)
6. Nathan Aspinall (first round)
7. Rob Cross (first round)
8. Peter Wright (first round)
- Danny Noppert (quarter-finals)
- Dirk van Duijvenbode (first round)
- Dimitri Van den Bergh (first round)
- Raymond van Barneveld (quarter-finals)
- Jermaine Wattimena (first round)
- Gian van Veen (semi-finals)
- Vincent van der Voort (first round)
- Kevin Doets (quarter-finals)

== Draw ==
The draw was made on 25 January.

First round (best of 11 legs); 26 January
1	Luke Littler 90.85	6
Dirk van Duijvenbode 82.66	2
Luke Humphries 93.94	6
Jermaine Wattimena 82.48	0
4	Gerwyn Price 103.43	6
Dimitri Van den Bergh 102.43	3
Peter Wright 81.65	2
Kevin Doets 98.31	6
2	Michael van Gerwen 94.06	6
Vincent van der Voort 83.42	1
Rob Cross 98.13	5
Raymond van Barneveld 93.25	6
3	Michael Smith 88.22	3
Gian van Veen 90.00	6
Nathan Aspinall 88.38	2
Danny Noppert 95.68	6

Quarter-finals (best of 11 legs); 27 January
1	Luke Littler 97.82	6
Luke Humphries 92.81	5
4	Gerwyn Price 94.87	6
Kevin Doets 92.65	3
2	Michael van Gerwen 101.15	6
Raymond van Barneveld 97.91	5
Gian van Veen 100.92	6
Danny Noppert 94.10	3

Semi-finals (best of 13 legs); 27 January
1	Luke Littler 98.21	7
4	Gerwyn Price 94.46	4
2	Michael van Gerwen 96.88	7
Gian van Veen 90.56	4

Final (best of 15 legs); 27 January
1	Luke Littler 106.71	6
2	Michael van Gerwen 100.59	8
