= John Hurring =

New Zealand darts player

Personal information
- Nickname: "The Danger"
- Born: 16 September 1984 (age 42) Christchurch, New Zealand
- Home town: Christchurch, New Zealand

Sport
- Sport: Darts
- Playing since: 2013
- Darts: 22g Shot
- Laterality: Right-handed
- Walk-on music: "Danger Zone" by Kenny Loggins

Organisation (see split in darts)
- PDC: 2018–2021

Other tournament wins
- Years
DPNZ Pro Tour (6x)
DPNZ Pro Tour (Auckland)	2023, 2024
DPNZ Pro Tour (Christchurch)	2025 (2x)
DPNZ Pro Tour (Hamilton)	2024
DPNZ Pro Tour (Nelson)	2024

John Hurring (born 16 September 1984) is a New Zealand professional darts player who plays in Professional Darts Corporation (PDC) events.

== Career ==
Hurring made his World Series of Darts debut at the 2018 Auckland Darts Masters as a late replacement for Corey Cadby, where he missed match darts against the then-reigning world champion Rob Cross, but would lose the match 6–5.
