= 2024 Australian Darts Masters =

Tournament information
- Dates: 9–10 August 2024
- Venue: WIN Entertainment Centre
- Location: Wollongong
- Country: Australia
- Organisation(s): PDC
- Format: Legs
- Prize fund: £60,000
- Winner's share: £20,000
- High checkout: 161 Michael Smith

Champion(s)
- Gerwyn Price

The 2024 Australian Darts Masters was a professional darts tournament that was held at the WIN Entertainment Centre in Wollongong, Australia from 9–10 August 2024. It was the first staging of the tournament by the Professional Darts Corporation, and the sixth event in the 2024 World Series of Darts. The tournament featured 16 players (eight top-ranking PDC players and eight regional qualifiers).

Gerwyn Price won the tournament, defeating Luke Littler 8–1 in the final.

== Prize money ==
The total prize fund remained at £60,000.

Position (no. of players)		Prize money (Total: £60,000)
Winner	(1)	£20,000
Runner-up	(1)	£10,000
Semi-finalists	(2)	£5,000
Quarter-finalists	(4)	£2,500
First round	(8)	£1,250

== Qualifiers ==
The PDC announced the 8 elite players on 7 May. Both Michael van Gerwen and Nathan Aspinall declined their invites for family reasons. Australia's Damon Heta was a part of the PDC representatives list.

The seedings were based on the World Series Order of Merit following the first 5 events.

1. Luke Littler (runner-up)
2. Rob Cross (quarter-finals)
3. Gerwyn Price (winner)
4. Luke Humphries (quarter-finals)
5. Michael Smith (quarter-finals)
6. Peter Wright (semi-finals)
7. Dimitri Van den Bergh (semi-finals)
8. Damon Heta (quarter-finals)

The Oceanic qualifiers consisted of their other PDC Tour Card holders (Simon Whitlock and Haupai Puha), plus the four Australian players who won the DPA qualifiers, along with one New Zealand player from the DPNZ qualifier, and the highest-ranked non-qualifier on the DPA Order of Merit on 14 July.

Qualification	Player
PDC Tour Card Holders	Simon Whitlock (first round)
PDC Tour Card Holders	Haupai Puha (first round)
DPA Qualifiers	Brenton Lloyd (first round)
DPA Qualifiers	Rob Modra (first round)
DPA Qualifiers	Stuart Coburn (first round)
DPA Qualifiers	Joe Comito (first round)
DPNZ Qualifier	John Hurring (first round)
Highest Ranked Non-Qualifier On DPA Order of Merit	Jeremy Fagg (first round)

== Draw ==
The draw was made on 8 August.

First round (best of 11 legs); 9 August
1	Luke Littler 90.68	6
Rob Modra 90.44	2
Michael Smith 88.70	6
Stuart Coburn 76.54	2
4	Luke Humphries 87.18	6
Joe Comito 70.11	1
Dimitri Van den Bergh 86.85	6
Jeremy Fagg 72.40	1
2	Rob Cross 91.50	6
Haupai Puha 86.82	5
Peter Wright 95.42	6
Simon Whitlock 84.11	1
3	Gerwyn Price 95.18	6
Brenton Lloyd 81.28	2
Damon Heta 89.29	6
John Hurring 71.58	0

Quarter-finals (best of 11 legs); 10 August
1	Luke Littler 104.03	6
Michael Smith 99.93	4
4	Luke Humphries 90.16	2
Dimitri Van den Bergh 103.19	6
2	Rob Cross 92.51	4
Peter Wright 94.04	6
3	Gerwyn Price 91.38	6
Damon Heta 86.54	4

Semi-finals (best of 13 legs); 10 August
1	Luke Littler 104.92	7
Dimitri Van den Bergh 102.22	6
Peter Wright 93.24	6
3	Gerwyn Price 99.34	7

Final (best of 15 legs); 10 August
1	Luke Littler 94.24	1
3	Gerwyn Price 99.42	8
