= 2024 New Zealand Darts Masters =

Tournament information
- Dates: 16–17 August 2024
- Venue: Globox Arena
- Location: Hamilton
- Country: New Zealand
- Organisation(s): PDC
- Format: Legs
- Prize fund: £60,000
- Winner's share: £20,000
- High checkout: 155 Jonny Tata

Champion(s)
- Luke Humphries

The 2024 New Zealand Darts Masters was a professional darts tournament that was held at the Globox Arena in Hamilton, New Zealand from 16–17 August 2024. It was the fourth staging of the tournament by the Professional Darts Corporation, and the seventh event in the 2024 World Series of Darts. The tournament featured 16 players (eight top-ranking PDC players and eight regional qualifiers).

Rob Cross was the defending champion after defeating Nathan Aspinall 8–7 in the 2023 final. He was eliminated in the quarter-finals, losing 6–5 to Damon Heta.

Luke Humphries won his first World Series title, coming back from 6–2 down to defeat Luke Littler 7–6 in the semi-finals before beating Damon Heta 8–2 in the final.

== Prize money ==
The total prize fund remained at £60,000.

Position (no. of players)		Prize money (Total: £60,000)
Winner	(1)	£20,000
Runner-up	(1)	£10,000
Semi-finalists	(2)	£5,000
Quarter-finalists	(4)	£2,500
First round	(8)	£1,250

== Qualifiers ==
The PDC announced the 8 elite players on 7 May. Both Michael van Gerwen and Nathan Aspinall declined their invites for family reasons. Australia's Damon Heta was a part of the PDC representatives list.

The seedings were based on the World Series Order of Merit following the first 6 events.

1. Luke Littler (semi-finals)
2. Gerwyn Price (quarter-finals)
3. Rob Cross (quarter-finals)
4. Luke Humphries (champion)
5. Michael Smith (quarter-finals)
6. Peter Wright (semi-finals)
7. Dimitri Van den Bergh (quarter-finals)
8. Damon Heta (runner-up)

The Oceanic qualifiers consisted of their PDC Tour Card holders (Simon Whitlock and Haupai Puha), plus the top three players on the DPNZ Order of Merit, the two New Zealand players who won the DPNZ qualifiers, along with the highest ranked player on the DPA Order of Merit.

The field was confirmed on 25 July.

Qualification	Player
PDC Tour Card Holder	Simon Whitlock (first round)
PDC Tour Card Holder	Haupai Puha (first round)
DPNZ Order of Merit #1	Mark Cleaver (first round)
DPNZ Order of Merit #2	Kayden Milne (first round)
DPNZ Order of Merit #3	Ben Robb (first round)
DPNZ Qualifiers	Jonny Tata (first round)
DPNZ Qualifiers	Daniel Snookes (first round)
DPA Order of Merit #1	Jeremy Fagg (first round)

== Draw ==
The draw was made on 15 August.

First round (best of 11 legs); 16 August
1	Luke Littler 102.24	6
Jonny Tata 93.34	3
Dimitri Van den Bergh 94.14	6
Mark Cleaver 83.23	3
4	Luke Humphries 99.07	6
Kayden Milne 89.60	3
Michael Smith 84.90	6
Jeremy Fagg 77.96	3
2	Gerwyn Price 96.62	6
Ben Robb 82.83	3
Peter Wright 87.55	6
Daniel Snookes 65.15	0
3	Rob Cross 97.12	6
Haupai Puha 92.24	5
Damon Heta 97.43	6
Simon Whitlock 84.78	1

Quarter-finals (best of 11 legs); 17 August
1	Luke Littler 103.78	6
Dimitri Van den Bergh 99.48	4
4	Luke Humphries 99.42	6
Michael Smith 101.29	4
2	Gerwyn Price 88.78	4
Peter Wright 103.36	6
3	Rob Cross 96.52	5
Damon Heta 93.38	6

Semi-finals (best of 13 legs); 17 August
1	Luke Littler 93.99	6
4	Luke Humphries 95.10	7
Peter Wright 97.61	4
Damon Heta 96.82	7

Final (best of 15 legs); 17 August
4	Luke Humphries 102.21	8
Damon Heta 95.68	2
