= 2024 Bahrain Darts Masters =

Tournament information
- Dates: 18–19 January 2024
- Venue: Bahrain International Circuit
- Location: Sakhir, Bahrain
- Organisation(s): Professional Darts Corporation (PDC)
- Format: Legs
- Prize fund: £60,000
- Winner's share: £20,000
- Nine-dart finish: Luke Littler
- High checkout: 170 Haruki Muramatsu; Luke Littler

Champion(s)
- Luke Littler (ENG)

The 2024 Bahrain Darts Masters was a professional darts tournament that was held at the Bahrain International Circuit in Sakhir, Bahrain from 18–19 January 2024. It was the second staging of the tournament by the Professional Darts Corporation and was the first event in the 2024 World Series of Darts. The tournament featured 16 players (8 PDC representatives and 8 Asian representatives).

Michael Smith was the defending champion, having defeated Gerwyn Price 8–6 in the 2023 final. However, he lost 7–6 to Michael van Gerwen in the semi-finals.

On 19 January, two days before his 17th birthday, Luke Littler became the youngest player to hit a televised nine-dart finish, achieving the feat in the first leg of his 6–3 quarter-final win over Nathan Aspinall. The previous record of 17 years and 298 days had been set by van Gerwen at the 2007 Masters of Darts. Littler also became the second player, after Phil Taylor, to hit a nine-darter in the World Series.

Littler went on to win the tournament, and capture his first PDC senior title, by beating Gerwyn Price 7–3 in the semi-finals and Michael van Gerwen 8–5 in the final. He became the third player, after van Gerwen and Nathan Aspinall, to win a World Series title on his debut.

== Prize money ==
The total prize fund is at £60,000.

Position (no. of players)		Prize money (Total: £60,000)
Winner	(1)	£20,000
Runner-up	(1)	£10,000
Semi-finalists	(2)	£5,000
Quarter-finalists	(4)	£2,500
First round	(8)	£1,250

== Qualifiers ==
The PDC announced the 16-man line-up on 8 January 2024.

1. Luke Humphries (quarter-finals)
2. Michael van Gerwen (runner-up)
3. Michael Smith (semi-finals)
4. Nathan Aspinall (quarter-finals)
5. Gerwyn Price (semi-finals)
6. Peter Wright (quarter-finals)
7. Rob Cross (quarter-finals)
8. Luke Littler (champion)

The Asian representatives consisted of six invited players, alongside two Bahrain qualifiers that were decided in a qualifier. Christian Perez couldn't enter due to visa issues.

Qualification	Player
Asian Invitees	Lourence Ilagan (first round)
Asian Invitees	Paolo Nebrida (first round)
Asian Invitees	Reynaldo Rivera (first round)
Asian Invitees	Man Lok Leung (first round)
Asian Invitees	Haruki Muramatsu (first round)
Asian Invitees	Tomoya Goto (first round)
Bahrain qualifiers	Abdulla Saeed (first round)
Bahrain qualifiers	Hasan Haji (first round)

== Draw ==
The draw was announced on 17 January 2024.

First round (best of 11 legs); 18 January
1	Luke Humphries 98.02	6
Abdulla Saeed 68.83	0
Gerwyn Price 92.13	6
Reynaldo Rivera 94.86	4
4	Nathan Aspinall 97.20	6
Lourence Ilagan 84.35	5
Luke Littler 97.92	6
Man Lok Leung 90.56	3
2	Michael van Gerwen 106.09	6
Hasan Haji 60.18	0
Rob Cross 94.66	6
Tomoya Goto 94.69	3
3	Michael Smith 98.28	6
Paolo Nebrida 88.05	5
Peter Wright 91.69	6
Haruki Muramatsu 87.11	5

Quarter-finals (best of 11 legs); 19 January
1	Luke Humphries 95.39	4
Gerwyn Price 90.48	6
4	Nathan Aspinall 100.48	3
Luke Littler 104.50	6
2	Michael van Gerwen 105.97	6
Rob Cross 99.53	4
3	Michael Smith 95.52	6
Peter Wright 93.65	1

Semi-finals (best of 13 legs); 19 January
Gerwyn Price 92.88	3
Luke Littler 95.86	7
2	Michael van Gerwen 100.02	7
3	Michael Smith 91.58	6

Final (best of 15 legs); 19 January
Luke Littler 95.15	8
2	Michael van Gerwen 87.80	5
