= 2025 Players Championship Finals =

2025 Ladbrokes Players Championship Finals

Tournament information
- Dates: 21–23 November 2025
- Venue: Butlin's Minehead
- Location: Minehead, England
- Organisation(s): Professional Darts Corporation (PDC)
- Format: Legs
- Prize fund: £600,000
- Winner's share: £120,000
- High checkout: 170; Kevin Doets; Nathan Aspinall

Champion(s)
- Luke Littler (ENG)

The 2025 Players Championship Finals (known for sponsorship reasons as the 2025 Ladbrokes Players Championship Finals) was a professional darts tournament that was held at the Butlin's Resort in Minehead, England, from 21 to 23 November 2025. It was the 18th staging of the Players Championship Finals by the Professional Darts Corporation (PDC). The total prize fund was £600,000, with the winner receiving £120,000. The 2025 PDC World Youth Championship final between Gian van Veen and Beau Greaves also took place, being held between the semi-finals and the final of the main tournament, where Van Veen retained his title with a 6–3 win.

The tournament was the last PDC event before the 2026 PDC World Darts Championship. It featured the top 64 players based on ranking money earned in the 34 Players Championship events that were held as part of the 2025 PDC Pro Tour. Seven-time champion Michael van Gerwen missed the event for the first time in his career. 61st seed Niko Springer withdrew from the event due to illness and was replaced by Ryan Meikle.

Luke Humphries was the two-time defending champion, having defeated Luke Littler 11–7 in the 2024 final. In a rematch of the 2025 European Championship final, Humphries lost 6–5 to Van Veen in the first round. Littler won the tournament, his first Players Championship Finals title, by defeating Nathan Aspinall 11–8 in the final.

== Overview ==
=== Background ===
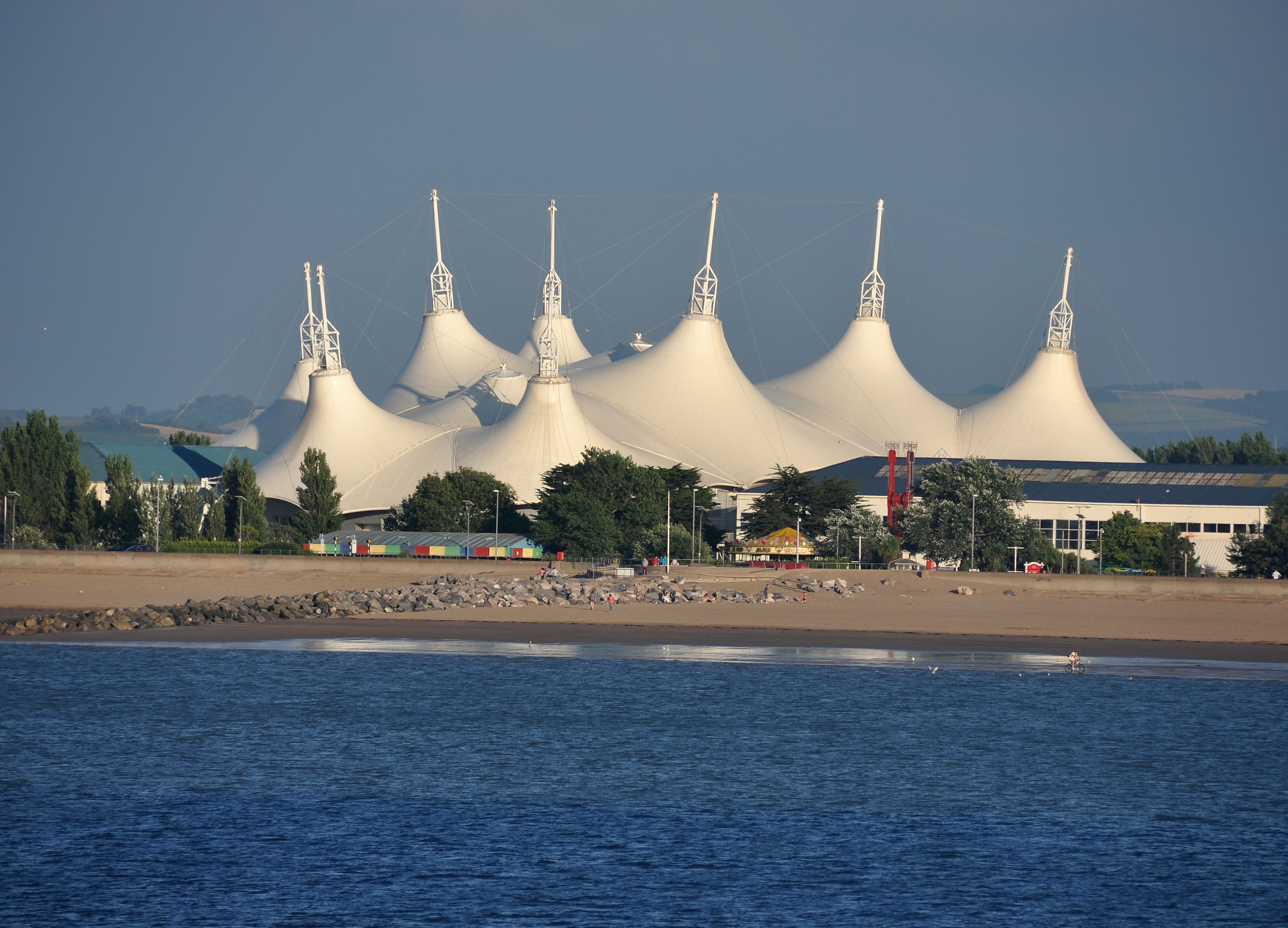
The tournament was held at the Butlin's Resort (pictured in 2010) in Minehead, England.

The 2025 Players Championship Finals was the 18th edition of the tournament to be staged by the Professional Darts Corporation (PDC) since the 2009 event. The tournament was first announced at the PDC Awards Dinner in January 2008 by PDC chairman Barry Hearn. The inaugural edition was held at the Circus Tavern in Purfleet, England – the former host venue of the PDC World Darts Championship. It was won by Phil Taylor, who defeated Robert Thornton 16–9 in the final. The tournament was initially held at the start of the year but was moved to the end of the year in 2011 to serve as the culmination to the PDC Pro Tour season. Qualifiers for the event are decided based on prize money earned during the year's Players Championship events; the field of participants expanded from 32 to 64 players in 2016.

The 2025 edition took place from 21 to 23 November 2025 at the Butlin's Resort in Minehead, England. British gambling company Ladbrokes continued its sponsorship of the event after becoming title sponsor the previous year. Luke Humphries was the defending champion, having defeated Luke Littler 11–7 in the 2024 final to retain his 2023 title.

=== Format ===
The 64-player field were seeded based on the Players Championship Order of Merit, a ranking comprising prize money won in Players Championship events during the year. All matches were in leg play format, with the number of legs required to win increasing as the tournament progressed.

- First round and second round: Best of 11 legs
- Third round and quarter-finals: Best of 19 legs
- Semi-finals and final: Best of 21 legs

=== Prize money ===
The prize fund remained at £600,000, with £120,000 going to the winner. The prize fund breakdown was:

Position (no. of players)		Prize money (Total: £600,000)
Winner	(1)	£120,000
Runner-up	(1)	£60,000
Semi-finalists	(2)	£30,000
Quarter-finalists	(4)	£20,000
Last 16 (third round)	(8)	£10,000
Last 32 (second round)	(16)	£6,500
Last 64 (first round)	(32)	£3,000

=== Broadcasts ===
The tournament was broadcast by ITV4 in the United Kingdom. It was the last PDC event to be produced by ITV Sport, with production of future televised tournaments on ITV4 to be managed by the PDC as part of a new multi-year deal. Other broadcasters included Viaplay in the Netherlands and the Nordic countries; DAZN in Germany, Austria and Switzerland; Fox Sports in Australia; Sky Sport in New Zealand; VTM in Belgium; Nova in Czechia and Slovakia; Network 4 in Hungary; FanDuel TV Extra in the United States; and BeIN Sports in the Middle East and North Africa. It was also available for subscribers outside of the United Kingdom, Germany, Austria and Switzerland on the PDC's streaming service, PDCTV, which also streamed matches on stage two worldwide.

== Qualification ==
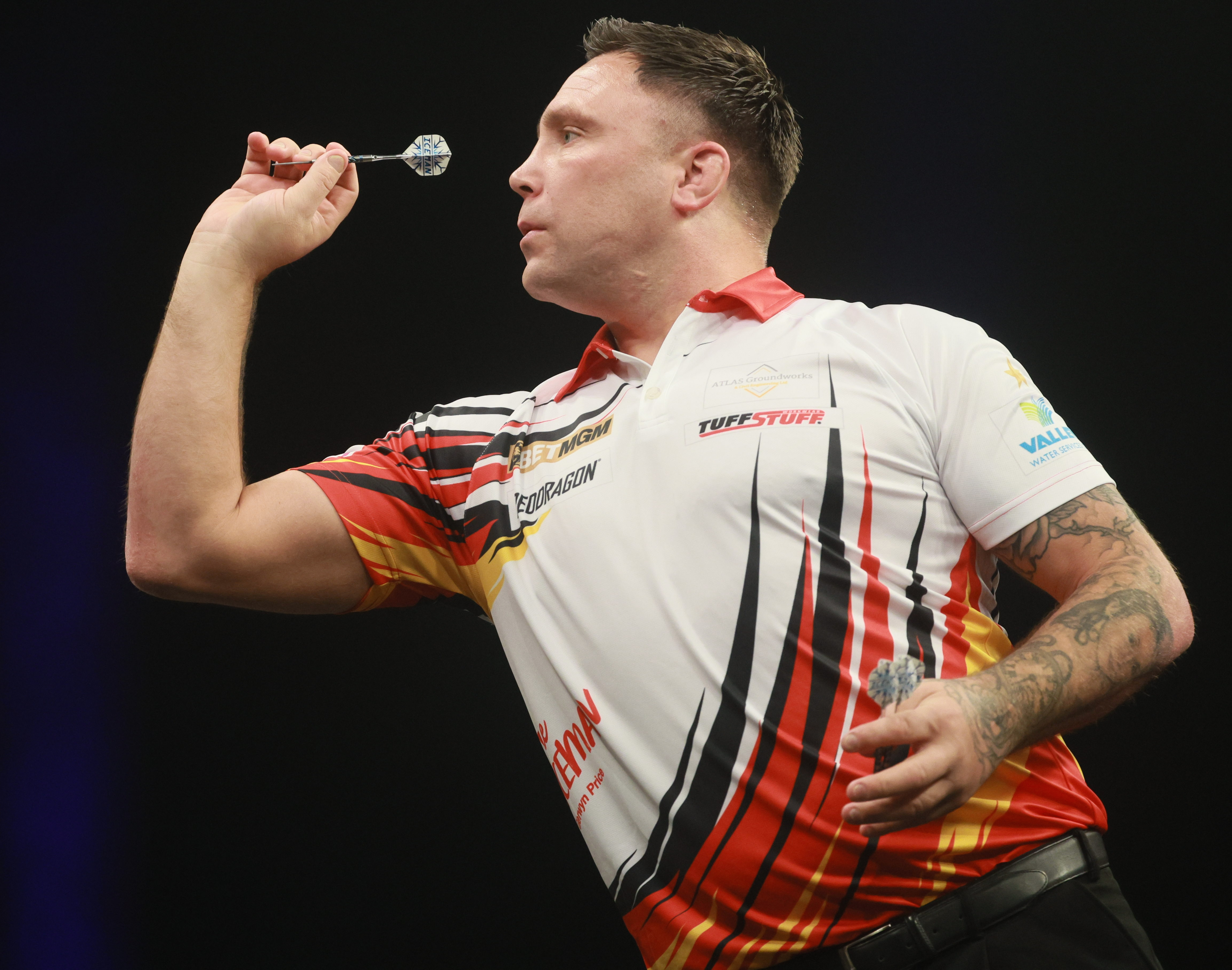
Gerwyn Price entered the tournament as the number one seed.

The 2025 Players Championship series was held as part of the 2025 PDC Pro Tour and consisted of 34 events. Following the final event of the season, the top 64 players on the Players Championship Order of Merit qualified for the tournament.

Three-time world champion and seven-time Players Championship Finals winner Michael van Gerwen missed the tournament for the first time in his career, having made his debut at the inaugural event in 2009 and competed in every subsequent edition. He withdrew from the final three Players Championship events of the season to focus on spending more time with his family. Reigning world champion Luke Littler was outside of the qualifying spots heading into the last three events of the season, but confirmed his place at the tournament by winning Players Championship 32. Defending champion Luke Humphries confirmed his qualification as the 58th seed on the final day of play, setting up a first-round match against 7th seed Gian van Veen in a repeat of the 2025 European Championship final.

Gerwyn Price entered the tournament as the number one seed after winning four Players Championship titles during the year. Wessel Nijman, Damon Heta, Ross Smith and Chris Dobey completed the top five in the Players Championship Order of Merit.

=== Top 64 in the Players Championship Order of Merit ===
The following players qualified for the tournament:

1. Gerwyn Price (WAL) (semi-finals)
2. Wessel Nijman (NED) (first round)
3. Damon Heta (AUS) (first round)
4. Ross Smith (ENG) (second round)
5. Chris Dobey (ENG) (quarter-finals)
6. Jermaine Wattimena (NED) (semi-finals)
7. Gian van Veen (NED) (second round)
8. Stephen Bunting (ENG) (second round)
9. Cameron Menzies (SCO) (first round)
10. Josh Rock (NIR) (quarter-finals)
11. Ryan Searle (ENG) (third round)
12. Jonny Clayton (WAL) (first round)
13. William O'Connor (IRL) (first round)
14. Joe Cullen (ENG) (first round)
15. Danny Noppert (NED) (third round)
16. Martin Schindler (GER) (third round)
17. Niels Zonneveld (NED) (first round)
18. Dirk van Duijvenbode (NED) (first round)
19. James Wade (ENG) (quarter-finals)
20. Gary Anderson (SCO) (second round)
21. Luke Woodhouse (ENG) (second round)
22. Kevin Doets (NED) (first round)
23. Scott Williams (ENG) (second round)
24. Bradley Brooks (ENG) (second round)
25. Brendan Dolan (NIR) (first round)
26. Krzysztof Ratajski (POL) (third round)
27. Dave Chisnall (ENG) (first round)
28. Mike De Decker (BEL) (first round)
29. Jeffrey de Graaf (SWE) (first round)
30. Andrew Gilding (ENG) (third round)
31. Karel Sedláček (CZE) (first round)
32. Rob Cross (ENG) (first round)
33. Sebastian Białecki (POL) (second round)
34. Nathan Aspinall (ENG) (runner-up)
35. Dom Taylor (ENG) (first round)
36. Luke Littler (ENG) (champion)
37. Cam Crabtree (ENG) (second round)
38. Ryan Joyce (ENG) (second round)
39. Raymond van Barneveld (NED) (first round)
40. Daryl Gurney (NIR) (quarter-finals)
41. Martin Lukeman (ENG) (first round)
42. Ian White (ENG) (first round)
43. Callan Rydz (ENG) (second round)
44. Alan Soutar (SCO) (first round)
45. Mario Vandenbogaerde (BEL) (first round)
46. Mickey Mansell (NIR) (first round)
47. Madars Razma (LAT) (second round)
48. Nick Kenny (WAL) (second round)
49. Michael Smith (ENG) (first round)
50. Ricky Evans (ENG) (first round)
51. Peter Wright (SCO) (second round)
52. Ricardo Pietreczko (GER) (third round)
53. James Hurrell (ENG) (third round)
54. Darren Beveridge (SCO) (first round)
55. Gabriel Clemens (GER) (first round)
56. Adam Lipscombe (ENG) (third round)
57. Ritchie Edhouse (ENG) (first round)
58. Luke Humphries (ENG) (first round)
59. Wesley Plaisier (NED) (first round)
60. Keane Barry (IRL) (first round)
61. ~~Niko Springer (GER)~~ (withdrew) (Note: Niko Springer withdrew from the tournament due to illness. He was replaced by the highest-ranked non-qualifier from the Players Championship Order of Merit, Ryan Meikle.)
62. Justin Hood (ENG) (second round)
63. Richard Veenstra (NED) (second round)
64. Max Hopp (GER) (first round)
65. Ryan Meikle (ENG) (first round)

== Summary ==
=== First round ===
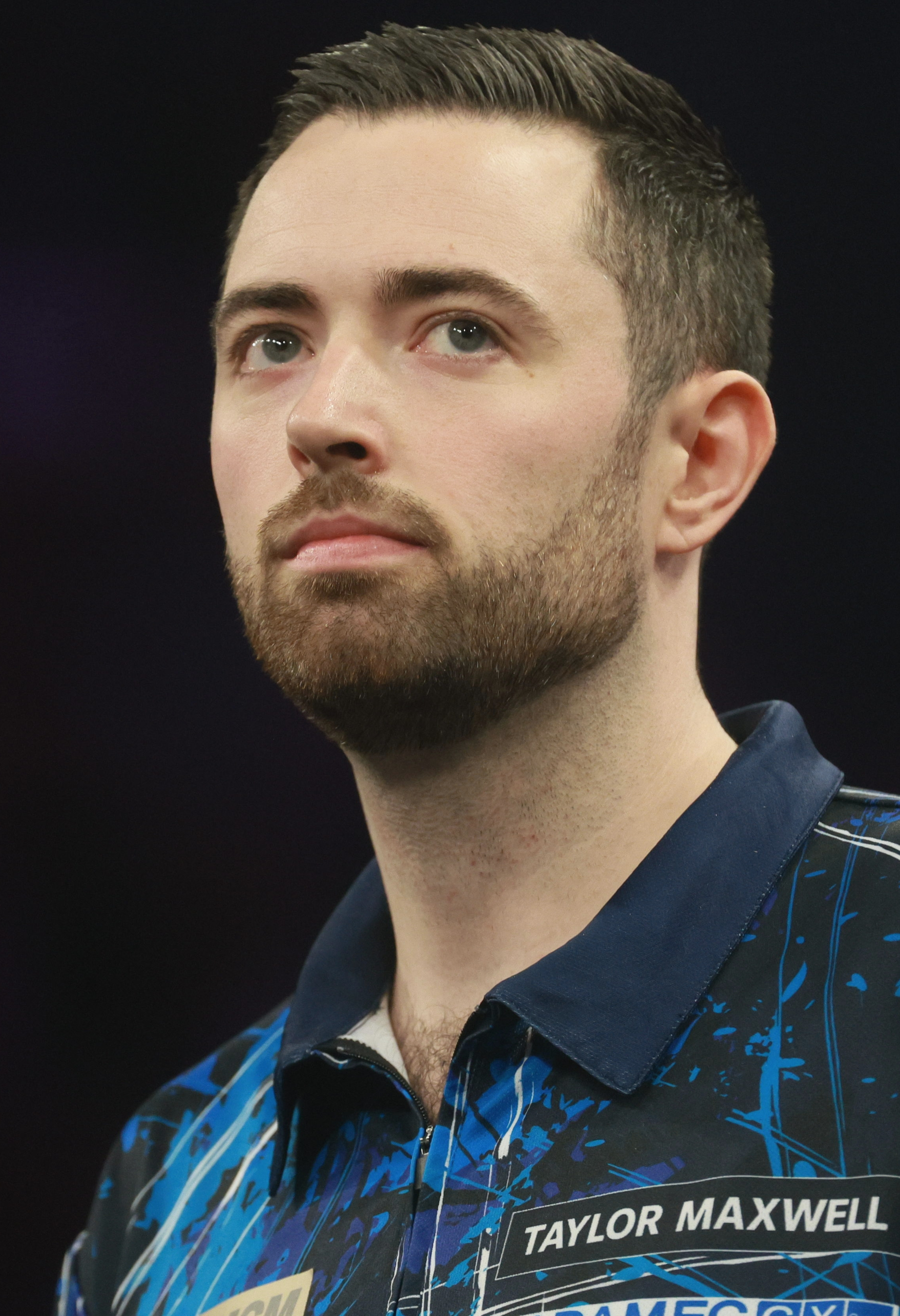
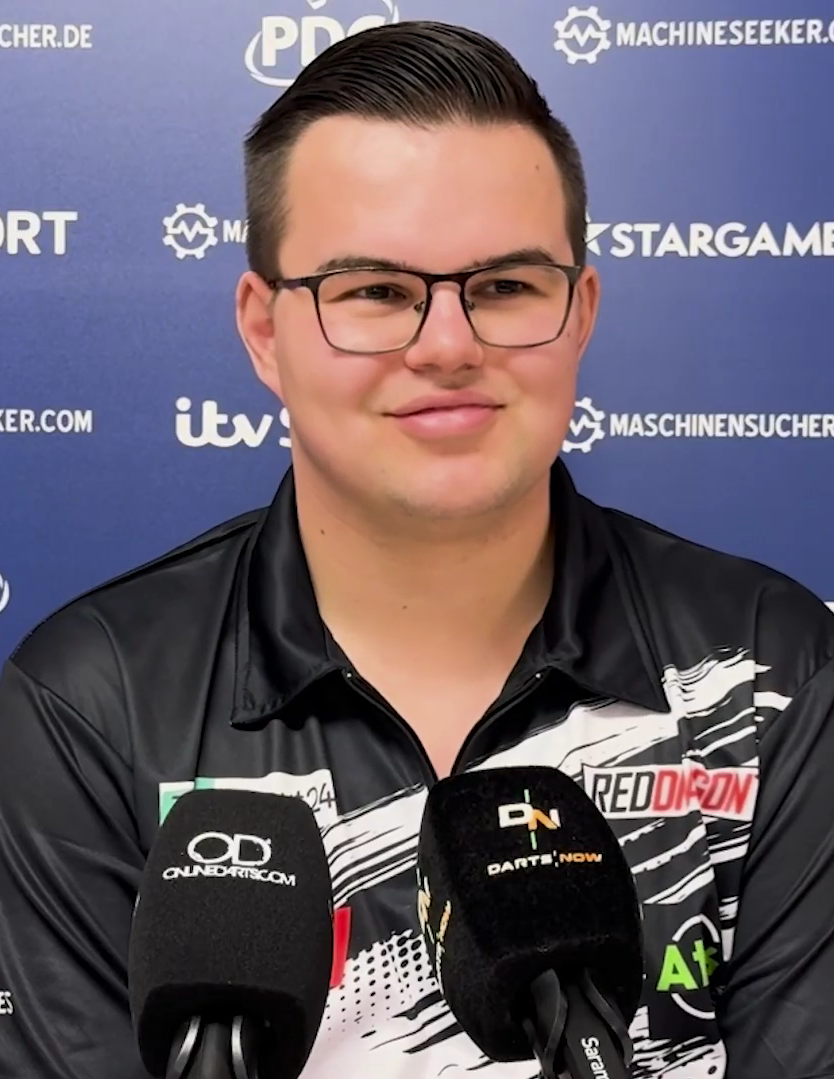
Luke Humphries (left) was the defending champion, but he was eliminated by Gian van Veen (right) in the first round.

The first round was played on 21 November, with matches split across the main stage and stage two. Defending champion Luke Humphries took a 3–0 lead against European champion Gian van Veen. Van Veen won his first leg by hitting a 161 checkout before he overturned the deficit and led 5–4. He missed two match darts as Humphries forced a deciding leg, where Van Veen would miss three further match darts before securing a 6–5 win. It was Van Veen's second victory against Humphries in the space of a month, after defeating him in the European Championship final, as well as his fourth consecutive victory against him overall. Reigning world champion Luke Littler played in his first match as world number one, having risen to the top of the PDC Order of Merit during his winning campaign at the Grand Slam. He defeated Jeffrey de Graaf 6–1 with a three-dart average of 104.46. Speaking about the Players Championship Finals, Littler commented: "It's a title that I have not won yet. I came up short last year to Luke Humphries, so I'm hungry to tick this one off."

Number one seed Gerwyn Price won his opening match by beating Max Hopp 6–2. Ryan Meikle, who received a place in the tournament following Niko Springer's withdrawal, suffered a 6–1 defeat to Ross Smith, while five-time world champion Raymond van Barneveld lost 6–3 to Krzysztof Ratajski. Number two seed Wessel Nijman hit five maximums and averaged 102.41 but was eliminated by Dutch compatriot Richard Veenstra, who prevailed in a deciding leg. Third seed Damon Heta was also beaten, losing 6–4 to debutant Justin Hood. World number six James Wade, an ever-present at the tournament, progressed to the second round by defeating Mickey Mansell 6–3. After the two shook hands without Mansell making eye contact, Wade recounted: "I shook his hand, said 'best of luck' and all that stuff but he wouldn't give it back to me and I was a little bit disheartened to be fair but it is what it is." 2018 champion Daryl Gurney eliminated fellow Northern Irish player Brendan Dolan 6–3, while their compatriot Josh Rock defeated Gabriel Clemens by the same scoreline.

Former finalists Jonny Clayton, Rob Cross and Dave Chisnall all went out in the first round; James Hurrell averaged 99.2 on his way to beating Clayton 6–3, Sebastian Białecki landed a 154 checkout in his 6–2 win over Cross, and Ryan Joyce defeated Chisnall 6–4. Cam Crabtree capitalised on six missed match darts from Mike De Decker to clinch a 6–5 win, former world champion Michael Smith was beaten 6–4 by Martin Schindler, and Cameron Menzies lost 6–1 to debutant Adam Lipscombe. Danny Noppert, who reached the semi-finals of the Grand Slam, hit a 164 checkout as he defeated Ricky Evans 6–2. Scottish world champions Gary Anderson and Peter Wright advanced with wins over Mario Vandenbogaerde and Joe Cullen respectively. Nathan Aspinall and Kevin Doets hit the only 170 checkouts of the tournament, with Aspinall triumphing 6–3 against Karel Sedláček and Doets succumbing to a 6–4 loss to Callan Rydz. World number four Stephen Bunting beat Ritchie Edhouse 6–2. Former UK Open champion Andrew Gilding survived nine match darts as he came back from 5–3 down to defeat Dom Taylor 6–5. William O'Connor lost his fourth consecutive first-round match at the tournament, being beaten 6–3 by Ricardo Pietreczko.

=== Second and third rounds ===
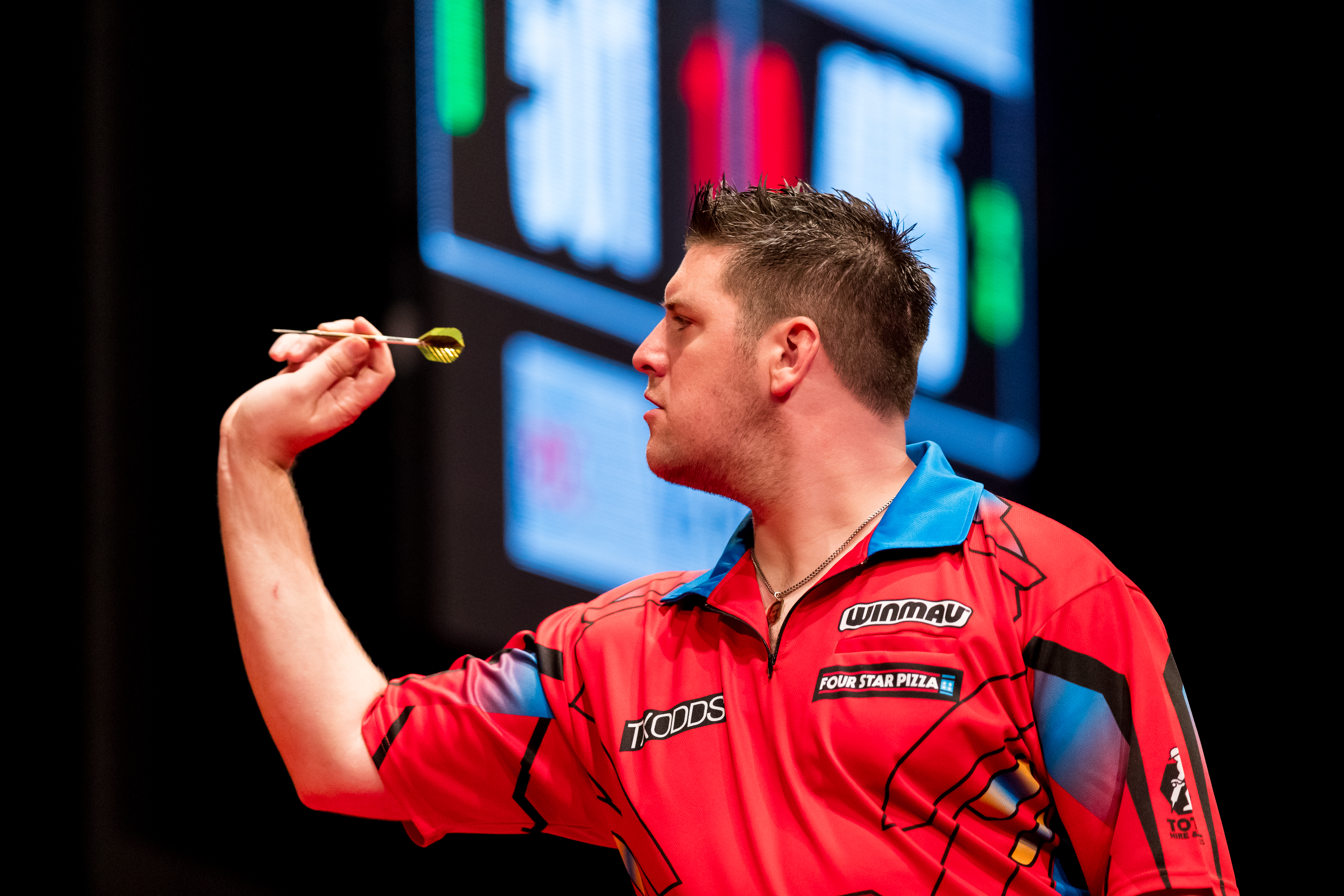
Daryl Gurney (pictured in 2019), who won the tournament in 2018, survived ten missed match darts from opponent Adam Lipscombe to progress to the quarter-finals.

The second round (best of 11 legs) and third round (best of 19 legs) were played on 22 November, with matches split across the main stage and stage two. Luke Littler averaged 107 in his 6–3 victory over Ross Smith to advance to a third-round tie against Ricardo Pietreczko, who had survived five match darts from Gary Anderson to win a deciding leg in the second round. Littler initially went 5–3 down but recovered to triumph 10–6. "I am never happy when I am losing. At 3–2 down, I then got it back to 5–5 and I just had to kick on there," Littler commented after the match. Top seed Gerwyn Price continued his run, beating Sebastian Białecki 6–1 before landing checkouts of 161 and 127 on his way to defeating Martin Schindler 10–6, winning six of the last seven legs to progress to the quarter-finals. "I haven't been doing it on the TV, but I think I'm due," stated Price, who also said he was "feeling good mentally" and was "confident in [his] ability". Daryl Gurney eliminated Stephen Bunting and faced Adam Lipscombe in the third round. Lipscombe missed a total of ten match darts as Gurney brought the match to a deciding leg, where Gurney took victory in 11 darts to set up a quarter-final against Price.

Josh Rock followed a 6–0 whitewash of Scott Williams by defeating Krzysztof Ratajski 10–8 after going 8–2 in front; Ratajski had already eliminated Gian van Veen in the second round, coming back from 5–3 down and surviving two match darts to prevail 6–5. Nathan Aspinall confirmed his place in the last eight by whitewashing Richard Veenstra and beating Danny Noppert 10–8 in a match where both players hit six maximums. Jermaine Wattimena defeated Ryan Joyce 6–2 with an average of 108.94 before clinching a 10–8 victory against Ryan Searle to reach the quarter-finals of the tournament for the first time. James Wade earned wins over Peter Wright and Andrew Gilding to move on to the final day, while fifth seed Chris Dobey came through a deciding leg against Cam Crabtree before winning 10–5 against James Hurrell to also advance.

=== Quarter-finals ===
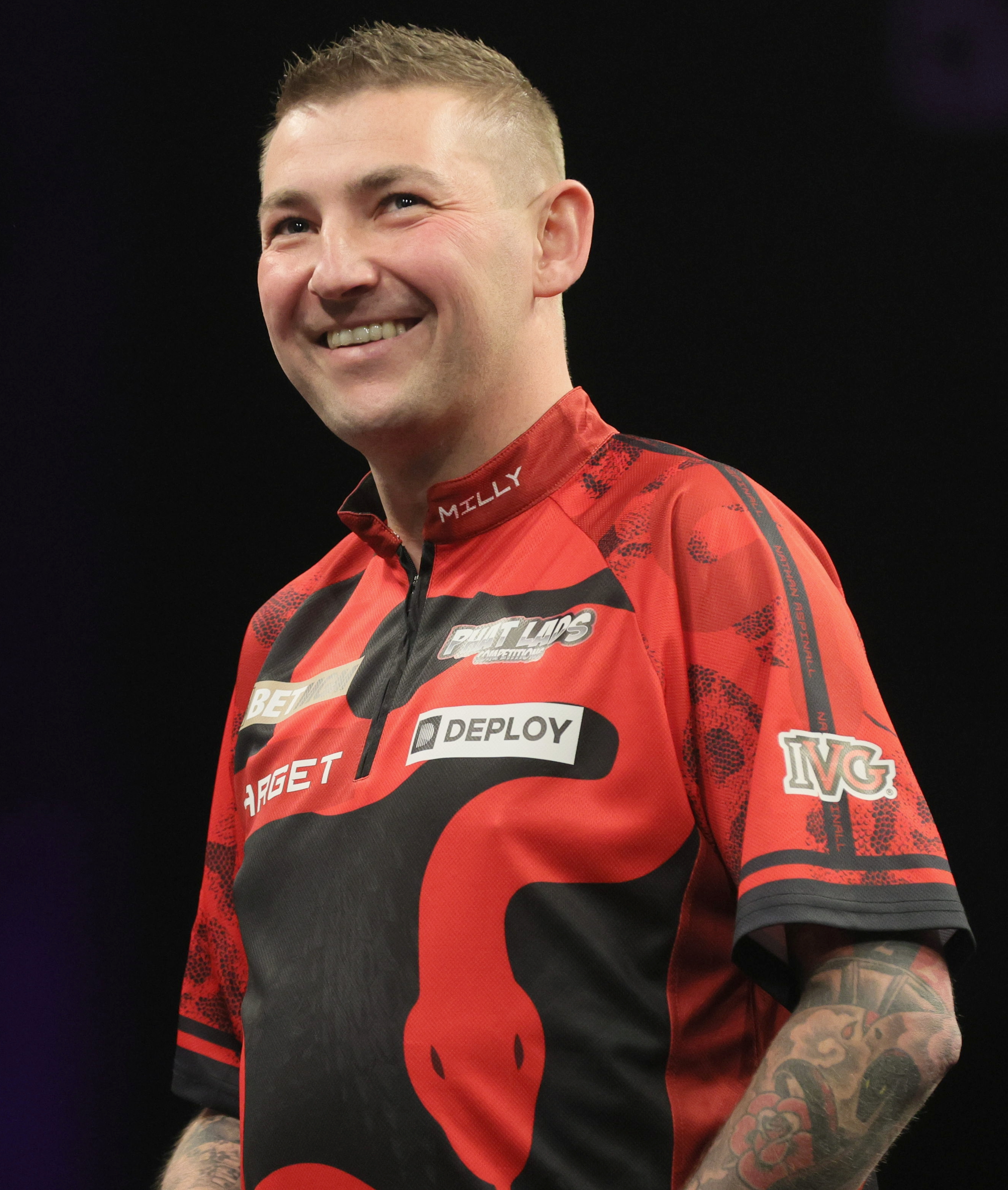
Nathan Aspinall (pictured) defeated Josh Rock 10–8 and Jermaine Wattimena 11–2 to secure a place in the final.

The quarter-finals were played in the afternoon session on 23 November. Gerwyn Price faced Daryl Gurney in the session's opening match. Gurney was able to go 6–5 ahead but Price then found two breaks of throw to take control, converting a 117 checkout to complete a run of five consecutive legs and win 10–6. Chris Dobey almost produced a nine-dart finish in the fifth leg of his quarter-final against Luke Littler, missing the final dart at double 18 by a considerable distance. Littler went on to win 10–5 with an average of almost 108, hitting nine maximums in the process. Littler said to "expect fireworks" in his semi-final tie against Price.

Nathan Aspinall took a 5–1 lead against Josh Rock in the third quarter-final. Rock found himself back in the match as he levelled the score at 8–8, but Aspinall claimed the next two legs for a 10–8 victory. First-time Players Championship Finals quarter-finalist Jermaine Wattimena went one step further as he defeated James Wade by the same scoreline, finishing the match with a 156 checkout.

=== Semi-finals ===
The semi-finals were played in the evening session on 23 November. Gerwyn Price faced Luke Littler and Nathan Aspinall faced Jermaine Wattimena. Price was competing in his first semi-final at the event in six years, while Littler reached his second successive semi-final, which marked his seventh major semi-final of 2025. Aspinall and Wattimena both reached the final four of the tournament for the first time, with Wattimena achieving his second PDC major semi-final.

Littler established a 5–2 lead against Price in the opening match. The number one seed reduced the deficit to 7–6, hitting a 114 checkout along the way, but the world number one restored a two-leg lead with a break of throw. Littler pinned double 16 to win 11–8 and secure a place in the final, ending the match with an average of 108.48. "We always bring the best out of each other, as shown by another cracking contest between us," Littler remarked afterwards.

Aspinall gained control of his semi-final with Wattimena early, completing a ten-dart leg to go 5–1 ahead. He won a further four legs on his way to 9–1 until Wattimena broke throw with a 70 checkout to claim his second leg of the match. Aspinall proceeded to take the next two legs for an 11–2 victory.

=== Final ===
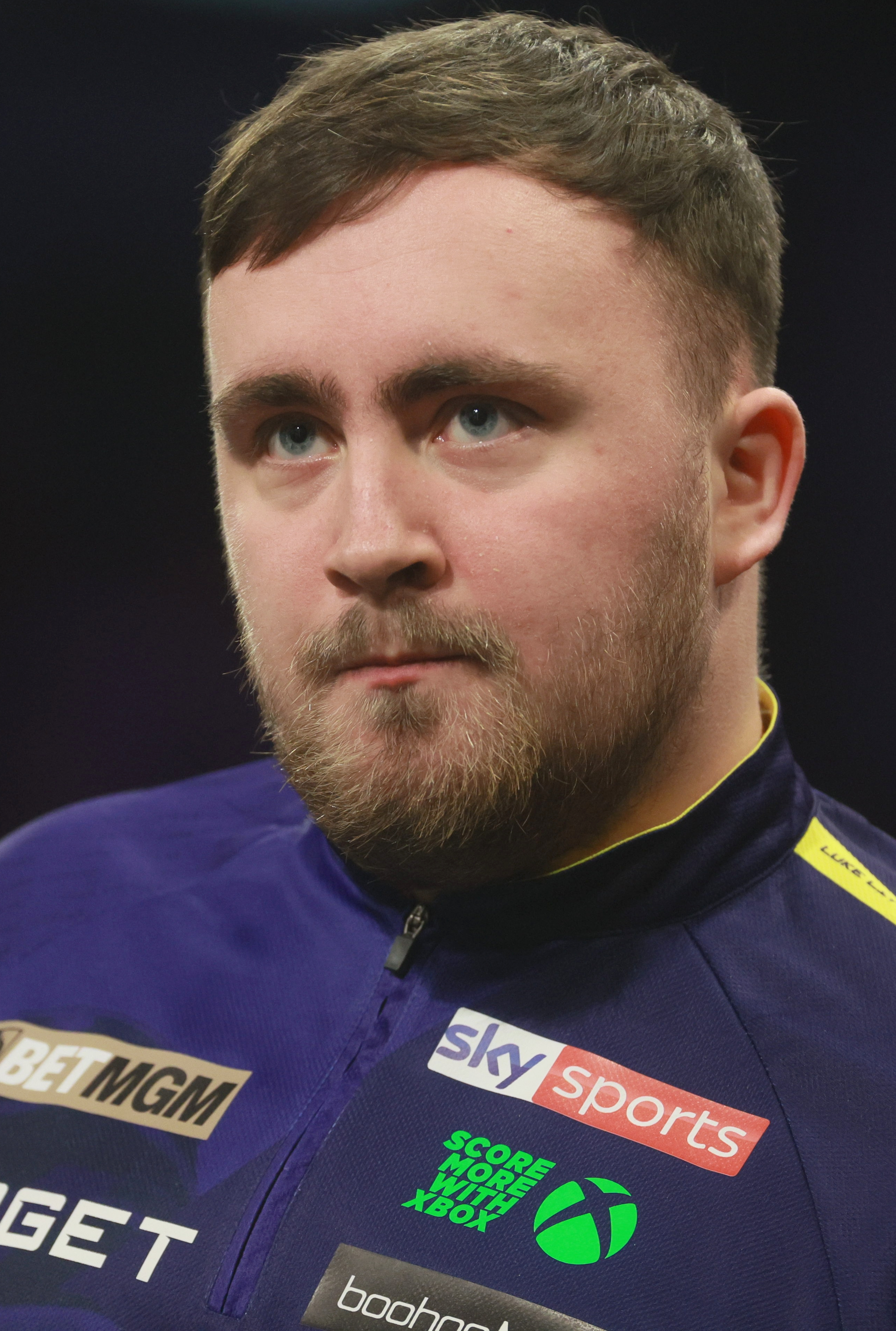
Luke Littler won the Players Championship Finals for the first time.

The final between 34th seed Nathan Aspinall and 36th seed Luke Littler was played in the evening session on 23 November after the World Youth Championship final. Aspinall, competing in the tournament's final for the first time and his seventh major final overall, was seeking his third major title, having previously won the 2019 UK Open and the 2023 World Matchplay. Littler, who finished as runner-up to Luke Humphries the previous year, reached his second straight final. He entered the tournament having won five major titles in 2025: the World Championship, UK Open, World Matchplay, World Grand Prix and Grand Slam. ITV Sport pundit Mark Webster previewed the match, stating that Aspinall "has to be at his best" and Littler "has to drop his level" if a possible Aspinall victory were to occur. "[Aspinall]'s got to take his opportunities and be ruthless, just like he was against Jermaine Wattimena," he added.

Littler maintained a healthy lead for the majority of the final, extending his 5–2 lead to 8–4. However, Aspinall fought back and won four of the next five legs, including checkouts of 127, 87 and 86, as he reduced the gap to 9–8. From there, Littler raced towards an 11–8 victory, winning the final leg by executing a 171 set-up shot and checking out 88 on double 6. Littler ended the match with an average of 103.33 as opposed to Aspinall's 93.64, although the runner-up hit more maximums in the final.

Littler won the Players Championship Finals for the first time; it was the eighth different PDC major title Littler had captured, leaving him with just the World Masters and the European Championship to complete the set. It was Littler's sixth major ranking title of the year, a tally only achieved previously by Phil Taylor and Michael van Gerwen. It was his ninth PDC major title overall, placing him fourth in the all-time list of major winners behind Taylor, Van Gerwen and James Wade. Aspinall, ranked world number 21 on the PDC Order of Merit before the tournament, re-entered the world's top 16 as he rose to world number 15. Littler declared that he was "very proud" to win his maiden Players Championship Finals title and that there were "only two more [major titles] to go". He closed by saying, "I'm very proud to lift this trophy, and now it's all eyes on the big one at the World Championship." Speaking about being back in the world's top 16, Aspinall said: "I'm back in the top 16 where I belong, and that was a big target coming into the weekend." He called Littler a "good mate of [his]" and affirmed that he was happy to share the stage with him.

== Draw ==
There was no draw held as all players were put in a fixed bracket by their seeding positions. The tournament bracket was confirmed following Players Championship 34 on 30 October. Numbers to the left of a player's name show the seedings for the 64 players in the tournament. Figures to the right of a player's name state their three-dart average in a match. The sole replacement player is indicated by 'Alt'. Players in bold denote match winners.

=== Finals ===
**Quarter-finals** (best of 19 legs); 23 November
**1**	**Gerwyn Price 97.30**	**10**
40	Daryl Gurney 92.07	6
**36**	**Luke Littler 107.88**	**10**
5	Chris Dobey 104.57	5
**34**	**Nathan Aspinall 101.40**	**10**
10	Josh Rock 95.45	8
19	James Wade 97.37	8
**6**	**Jermaine Wattimena 100.30**	**10**

**Semi-finals** (best of 21 legs); 23 November
1	Gerwyn Price 101.99	8
**36**	**Luke Littler 108.48**	**11**
**34**	**Nathan Aspinall 100.09**	**11**
6	Jermaine Wattimena 95.30	2

**Final** (best of 21 legs); 23 November
**36**	**Luke Littler 103.33**	**11**
34	Nathan Aspinall 93.64	8

=== Top half ===
==== Section 1 ====
**First round** (best of 11 legs); 21 November
**1**	**Gerwyn Price 90.09**	**6**
64	Max Hopp 88.74	2
32	Rob Cross 85.88	2
**33**	**Sebastian Białecki 88.23**	**6**
**16**	**Martin Schindler 92.19**	**6**
49	Michael Smith 86.07	4
17	Niels Zonneveld 92.41	4
**48**	**Nick Kenny 88.20**	**6**
**8**	**Stephen Bunting 93.59**	**6**
57	Ritchie Edhouse 96.56	2
25	Brendan Dolan 88.82	3
**40**	**Daryl Gurney 86.74**	**6**
9	Cameron Menzies 89.94	1
**56**	**Adam Lipscombe 92.32**	**6**
**24**	**Bradley Brooks 97.21**	**6**
41	Martin Lukeman 82.80	1

**Second round** (best of 11 legs); 22 November
**1**	**Gerwyn Price 105.06**	**6**
33	Sebastian Białecki 99.03	1
**16**	**Martin Schindler 86.89**	**6**
48	Nick Kenny 86.14	4
8	Stephen Bunting 89.15	4
**40**	**Daryl Gurney 95.47**	**6**
**56**	**Adam Lipscombe 91.92**	**6**
24	Bradley Brooks 91.35	2

**Third round** (best of 19 legs); 22 November
**1**	**Gerwyn Price 98.88**	**10**
16	Martin Schindler 83.20	6
**40**	**Daryl Gurney 88.31**	**10**
56	Adam Lipscombe 89.21	9

**Quarter-finals** (best of 19 legs); 23 November
**1**	**Gerwyn Price 97.30**	**10**
40	Daryl Gurney 92.07	6

==== Section 2 ====
**First round** (best of 11 legs); 21 November
**4**	**Ross Smith 84.41**	**6**
Alt/65	Ryan Meikle 74.25	1
29	Jeffrey de Graaf 90.36	1
**36**	**Luke Littler 104.46**	**6**
13	William O'Connor 83.93	3
**52**	**Ricardo Pietreczko 91.69**	**6**
**20**	**Gary Anderson 97.03**	**6**
45	Mario Vandenbogaerde 90.00	2
**5**	**Chris Dobey 86.04**	**6**
60	Keane Barry 87.90	1
28	Mike De Decker 85.40	5
**37**	**Cam Crabtree 88.64**	**6**
12	Jonny Clayton 96.87	3
**53**	**James Hurrell 99.18**	**6**
**21**	**Luke Woodhouse 90.79**	**6**
44	Alan Soutar 88.76	2

**Second round** (best of 11 legs); 22 November
4	Ross Smith 102.47	3
**36**	**Luke Littler 107.15**	**6**
**52**	**Ricardo Pietreczko 90.17**	**6**
20	Gary Anderson 95.61	5
**5**	**Chris Dobey 95.67**	**6**
37	Cam Crabtree 101.05	5
**53**	**James Hurrell 90.83**	**6**
21	Luke Woodhouse 88.68	1

**Third round** (best of 19 legs); 22 November
**36**	**Luke Littler 102.67**	**10**
52	Ricardo Pietreczko 90.41	6
**5**	**Chris Dobey 97.35**	**10**
53	James Hurrell 90.66	5

**Quarter-finals** (best of 19 legs); 23 November
**36**	**Luke Littler 107.88**	**10**
5	Chris Dobey 104.57	5

=== Bottom half ===
==== Section 3 ====
**First round** (best of 11 legs); 21 November
2	Wessel Nijman 102.41	5
**63**	**Richard Veenstra 96.39**	**6**
31	Karel Sedláček 93.51	3
**34**	**Nathan Aspinall 95.98**	**6**
**15**	**Danny Noppert 103.84**	**6**
50	Ricky Evans 91.33	2
18	Dirk van Duijvenbode 89.51	3
**47**	**Madars Razma 89.42**	**6**
**7**	**Gian van Veen 96.07**	**6**
58	Luke Humphries 95.01	5
**26**	**Krzysztof Ratajski 83.94**	**6**
39	Raymond van Barneveld 76.90	3
**10**	**Josh Rock 88.08**	**6**
55	Gabriel Clemens 79.99	3
**23**	**Scott Williams 92.78**	**6**
42	Ian White 79.32	2

**Second round** (best of 11 legs); 22 November
63	Richard Veenstra 87.40	0
**34**	**Nathan Aspinall 94.93**	**6**
**15**	**Danny Noppert 102.91**	**6**
47	Madars Razma 84.00	1
7	Gian van Veen 100.81	5
**26**	**Krzysztof Ratajski 99.02**	**6**
**10**	**Josh Rock 107.36**	**6**
23	Scott Williams 96.00	0

**Third round** (best of 19 legs); 22 November
**34**	**Nathan Aspinall 96.78**	**10**
15	Danny Noppert 100.25	8
26	Krzysztof Ratajski 97.08	8
**10**	**Josh Rock 99.67**	**10**

**Quarter-finals** (best of 19 legs); 23 November
**34**	**Nathan Aspinall 101.40**	**10**
10	Josh Rock 95.45	8

==== Section 4 ====
**First round** (best of 11 legs); 21 November
3	Damon Heta 88.86	4
**62**	**Justin Hood 92.50**	**6**
**30**	**Andrew Gilding 92.53**	**6**
35	Dom Taylor 99.43	5
14	Joe Cullen 91.98	3
**51**	**Peter Wright 93.11**	**6**
**19**	**James Wade 94.70**	**6**
46	Mickey Mansell 95.04	3
**6**	**Jermaine Wattimena 101.58**	**6**
59	Wesley Plaisier 95.98	3
27	Dave Chisnall 86.55	4
**38**	**Ryan Joyce 93.04**	**6**
**11**	**Ryan Searle 98.58**	**6**
54	Darren Beveridge 98.76	1
22	Kevin Doets 91.89	4
**43**	**Callan Rydz 94.96**	**6**

**Second round** (best of 11 legs); 22 November
62	Justin Hood 94.30	5
**30**	**Andrew Gilding 94.73**	**6**
51	Peter Wright 88.68	4
**19**	**James Wade 93.51**	**6**
**6**	**Jermaine Wattimena 108.94**	**6**
38	Ryan Joyce 94.77	2
**11**	**Ryan Searle 94.25**	**6**
43	Callan Rydz 99.92	5

**Third round** (best of 19 legs); 22 November
30	Andrew Gilding 88.65	6
**19**	**James Wade 86.06**	**10**
**6**	**Jermaine Wattimena 94.09**	**10**
11	Ryan Searle 90.68	8

**Quarter-finals** (best of 19 legs); 23 November
19	James Wade 97.37	8
**6**	**Jermaine Wattimena 100.30**	**10**
