= 2025 European Darts Trophy =

Darts tournament

2025 Elten Safety Shoes European Darts Trophy

Tournament information
- Dates: 21–23 March 2025
- Venue: Lokhalle
- Location: Göttingen, Germany
- Organisation(s): Professional Darts Corporation (PDC)
- Format: Legs; Final – first to 8 legs
- Prize fund: £175,000
- Winner's share: £30,000
- High checkout: 170; Alan Soutar; Ritchie Edhouse; Rob Cross; Nathan Aspinall

Champion(s)
- Nathan Aspinall (ENG)

The 2025 European Darts Trophy (known for sponsorship reasons as the 2025 Elten Safety Shoes European Darts Trophy) was a professional darts tournament that took place at the Lokhalle in Göttingen, Germany from 21 to 23 March 2025. It was the second of fourteen PDC European Tour events on the 2025 PDC Pro Tour. It featured a field of 48 players and £175,000 in prize money, with £30,000 going to the winner.

Michael van Gerwen was the defending champion after defeating James Wade 8–3 in the final of the last edition of the event, which was in 2018. However, he lost 7–5 to Ryan Joyce in the semi-finals.

Nathan Aspinall won his first European Tour title by defeating Joyce 8–4 in the final.

== Prize money ==
The prize fund remained at £175,000, with £30,000 to the winner:

Stage (num. of players)		Prize money
Winner	(1)	£30,000
Runner-up	(1)	£12,000
Semi-finalists	(2)	£8,500
Quarter-finalists	(4)	£6,000
Third round losers	(8)	£4,000
Second round losers	(16)	£2,500*
First round losers	(16)	£1,250*
Total	£175,000	

- Pre-qualified players from the Orders of Merit who lose in their first match of the event shall not be credited with prize money on any Order of Merit. A player who qualifies as a qualifier, but later becomes a seed due to the withdrawal of one or more other players shall be credited with their prize money on all Orders of Merit regardless of how far they progress in the event.

== Qualification and format ==
In a change from the previous year, the top 16 on the two-year main PDC Order of Merit ranking were now seeded and entered the tournament in the second round, while the 16 qualifiers from the one-year PDC Pro Tour Order of Merit ranking entered in the first round. The seedings were confirmed on 7 February.

The remaining 16 places went to players from four qualifying events – 10 from the Tour Card Holder Qualifier (held on 12 February), four from the Host Nation Qualifier (held on 8 February), one from the Nordic & Baltic Associate Member Qualifier (held on 14 February), and one from the East European Associate Member Qualifier (held on 1 February).

The following players took part in the tournament:

Seeded Players

1. Luke Humphries (quarter-finals)
2. Michael van Gerwen (semi-finals)
3. Rob Cross (third round)
4. Jonny Clayton (second round)
5. Dave Chisnall (third round)
6. Damon Heta (second round)
7. Gerwyn Price (quarter-finals)
8. Nathan Aspinall (champion)
9. Chris Dobey (second round)
10. Danny Noppert (second round)
11. Peter Wright (second round)
12. James Wade (second round)
13. Gary Anderson (semi-finals)
14. Dimitri Van den Bergh (second round)
15. Josh Rock (second round)
16. Michael Smith (third round)

Pro Tour Order of Merit Qualifiers
- Ryan Searle (second round)
- Martin Schindler (third round)
- Ross Smith (quarter-finals)
- Daryl Gurney (first round)
- Gian van Veen (third round)
- Raymond van Barneveld (first round)
- Cameron Menzies (quarter-finals)
- Mike De Decker (third round)
- Wessel Nijman (third round)
- Ritchie Edhouse (second round)
- Jermaine Wattimena (third round)
- Dirk van Duijvenbode (first round)
- Ricardo Pietreczko (second round)
- Luke Woodhouse (second round)
- Andrew Gilding (second round)
- Ryan Joyce (runner-up)

Tour Card Qualifier
- Joe Cullen (first round)
- Alan Soutar (first round)
- Adam Hunt (first round)
- Connor Scutt (first round)
- Dominik Grüllich (first round)
- Martin Lukeman (first round)
- Callan Rydz (first round)
- Kevin Doets (first round)
- Niko Springer (second round)
- Ricky Evans (second round)
Host Nation Qualifier
- Paul Krohne (first round)
- Michael Unterbuchner (first round)
- Laurin Welk (first round)
- Daniel Klose (first round)
Nordic & Baltic Qualifier
- Marko Kantele (first round)
East European Qualifier
- Boris Krčmar (second round)

== Summary ==
=== First round ===
The first round was played on Friday 21 March. Reigning European Champion Ritchie Edhouse progressed to the next round by defeating Kevin Doets 6–2. Belgian Darts Open runner-up Mike De Decker prevailed 6–3 against 2024 Grand Slam of Darts runner-up Martin Lukeman. Ricky Evans defeated Raymond van Barneveld on stage for the first time as he won 6–4; Evans, whose sister Elisha died earlier that month, commented: "I've just won a game of darts after everything I've been through, so I'm the happiest man in Germany right now." Boris Krčmar added to his wins at the Belgian Darts Open with a 6–4 victory over Dirk van Duijvenbode, setting up a match against world number one Luke Humphries in the second round. Recent Players Championship title winner Martin Schindler beat Adam Hunt 6–2. Ryan Joyce whitewashed Joe Cullen, converting two-thirds of his attempts at double in the process. Connor Scutt missed five match darts to allow Gian van Veen to win their tie in a last-leg decider. Wessel Nijman almost conceded victory to a comeback from Paul Krohne but also managed to triumph 6–5. Ross Smith averaged 106.44 in a 6–1 win over Michael Unterbuchner.

=== Second round ===
The second round was played on Saturday 22 March, where the 16 seeded players entered the tournament. Michael van Gerwen, who won the tournament in 2017 and 2018, came back from 5–3 down to defeat Germany's Niko Springer 6–5. "We all know good Niko Springer is and I had to fight really hard," Van Gerwen admitted. Luke Humphries battled past Boris Krčmar to win 6–4 to reach the third round. Jermaine Wattimena achieved the second-highest average of his career (111.07) in a 6–4 victory over Chris Dobey. Martin Schindler saw off Jonny Clayton 6–1 while Mike De Decker eliminated Peter Wright 6–4. Nathan Aspinall put an end to a late comeback from Ritchie Edhouse to set up a third-round meeting with Wattimena. Ryan Joyce produced a 167 checkout on his way to a 6–4 victory over Dimitri Van den Bergh. Former world champions Gerwyn Price, Rob Cross, Michael Smith and Gary Anderson all advanced.

=== Final day ===
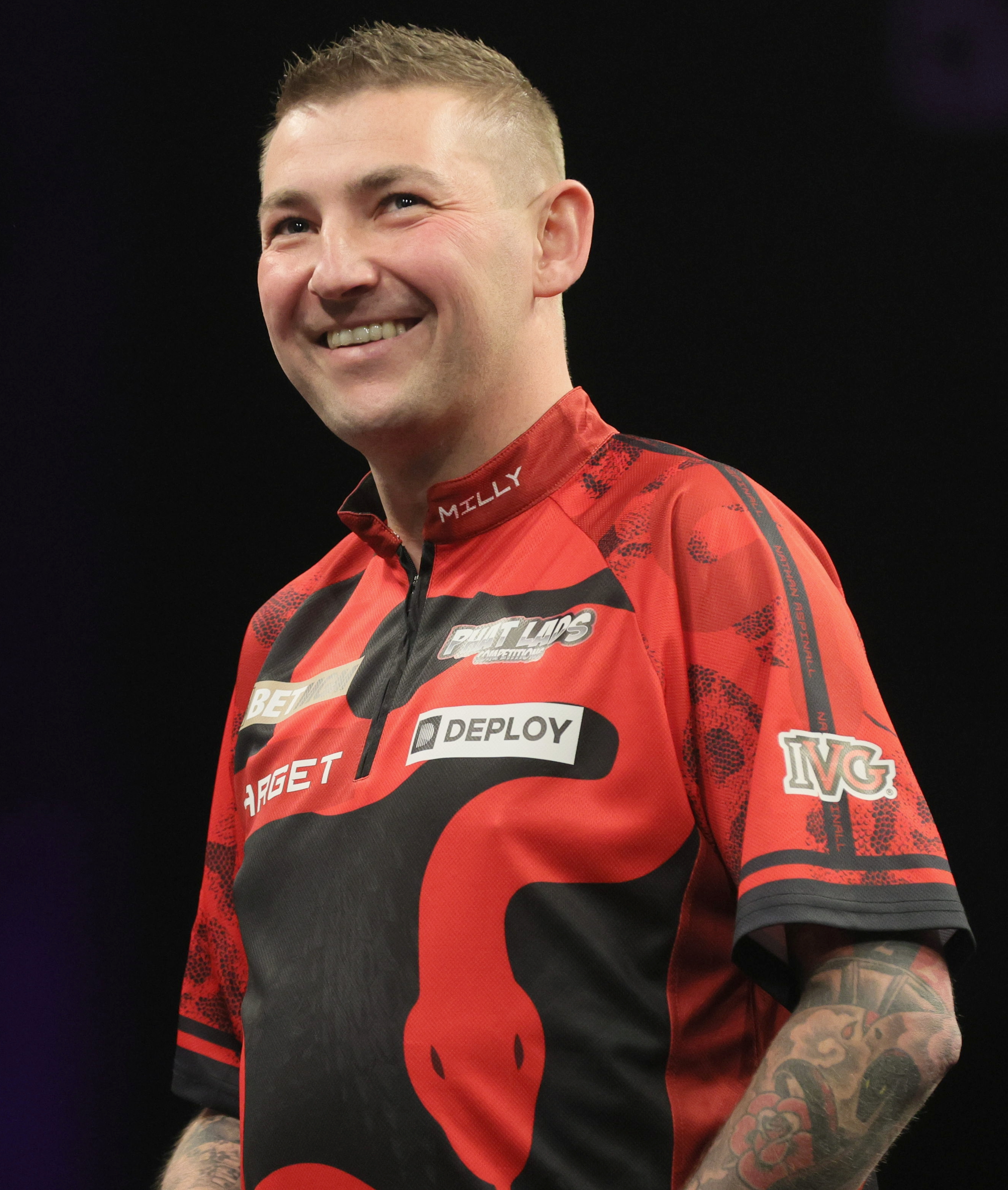
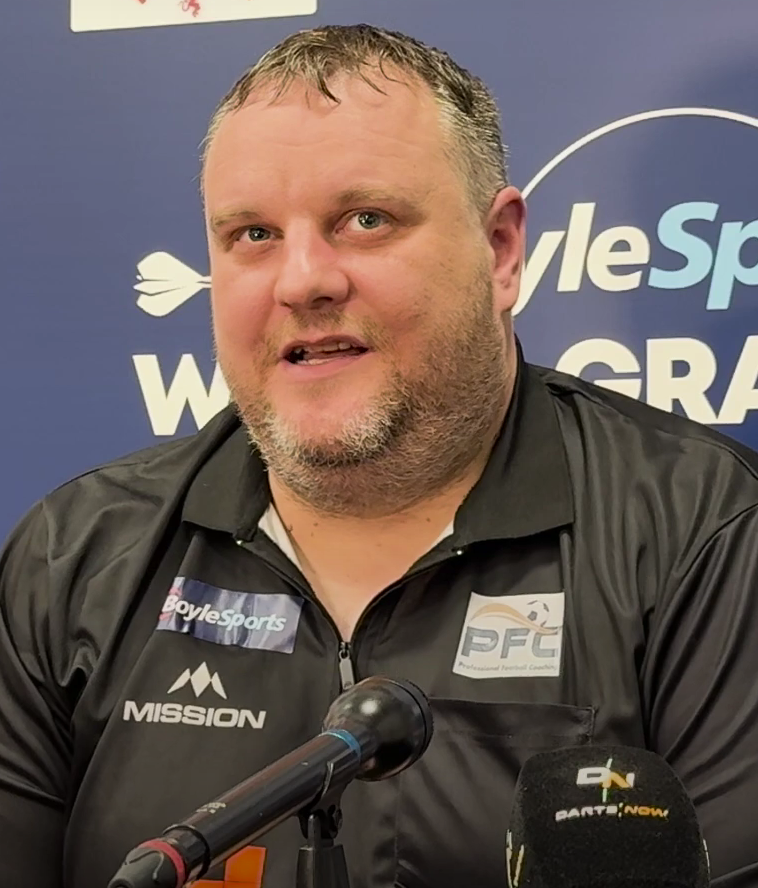
Nathan Aspinall and Ryan Joyce contested the final.

The third round, quarter-finals, semi-finals and final were played on Sunday 23 March. The final day saw Nathan Aspinall and Ryan Joyce reach the final. Aspinall got past Jermaine Wattimena in a last-leg decider in the third round before a 6–1 rout of Luke Humphries in the quarter-finals. In his semi-final tie against Gary Anderson, Aspinall took the match to another last-leg decider with a dramatic 170 checkout and progressed to the final with a 7–6 win. Joyce followed victories over Rob Cross and Cameron Menzies by stunning Michael van Gerwen 7–5 in the semi-finals. This was Joyce's first European Tour final, while Aspinall was unsuccessful in his only previous final at the 2023 German Darts Grand Prix.

Aspinall broke Joyce's throw in the first leg and established a 4–1 lead. Joyce made the match close by pulling the contest back to scores of 4–3 and 5–4 but Aspinall won the final three legs to win the final. Aspinall averaged 98 with five 180s scored. It was his first European Tour title and his first title overall since winning the 2023 World Matchplay. He became the 38th different player to win a European Tour event. Following his triumph, Aspinall said that after dealing with injuries and dartitis, this was "probably [his] proudest moment." He also stated: "This is what I needed. This will help me believe in myself and it shows I'm still good enough to compete against the top boys."

== Draw ==
The draw was announced on 20 March. Numbers to the left of players' names show the seedings for the top 16 in the tournament. The figures to the right of a player's name state their three-dart average in a match. Players in bold denote match winners.

**First round** (best of 11 legs); 21 March
Dirk van Duijvenbode 97.02	4
**Boris Krčmar 100.35**	**6**
**Ricardo Pietreczko 93.58**	**6**
Daniel Klose 87.26	3
**Ritchie Edhouse 94.93**	**6**
Kevin Doets 93.96	2
**Jermaine Wattimena 87.42**	**6**
Marko Kantele 76.42	2
**Martin Schindler 94.29**	**6**
Adam Hunt 87.60	2
**Luke Woodhouse 94.42**	**6**
Dominik Grüllich 87.30	4
Raymond van Barneveld 94.91	4
**Ricky Evans 95.55**	**6**
**Ross Smith 106.44**	**6**
Michael Unterbuchner 91.66	1
Daryl Gurney 90.57	4
**Niko Springer 95.34**	**6**
**Gian van Veen 92.43**	**6**
Connor Scutt 84.12	5
**Ryan Searle 99.10**	**6**
Laurin Welk 84.71	0
**Wessel Nijman 98.19**	**6**
Paul Krohne 91.55	5
**Andrew Gilding 94.97**	**6**
Callan Rydz 80.05	2
**Ryan Joyce 90.18**	**6**
Joe Cullen 81.41	0
**Cameron Menzies 99.91**	**6**
Alan Soutar 99.37	2
**Mike De Decker 93.61**	**6**
Martin Lukeman 90.38	3

**Second round** (best of 11 legs); 22 March
**1**	**Luke Humphries 101.35**	**6**
Boris Krčmar 102.88	4
**16**	**Michael Smith 94.27**	**6**
Ricardo Pietreczko 87.82	2
**8**	**Nathan Aspinall 88.59**	**6**
Ritchie Edhouse 91.02	5
9	Chris Dobey 101.73	4
**Jermaine Wattimena 111.07**	**6**
4	Jonny Clayton 89.93	1
**Martin Schindler 106.78**	**6**
**13**	**Gary Anderson 95.11**	**6**
Luke Woodhouse 90.51	4
**5**	**Dave Chisnall 97.32**	**6**
Ricky Evans 86.63	1
12	James Wade 98.10	2
**Ross Smith 99.34**	**6**
**2**	**Michael van Gerwen 101.23**	**6**
Niko Springer 98.90	5
15	Josh Rock 97.76	4
**Gian van Veen 100.46**	**6**
**7**	**Gerwyn Price 103.74**	**6**
Ryan Searle 105.62	4
10	Danny Noppert 99.96	5
**Wessel Nijman 93.91**	**6**
**3**	**Rob Cross 99.02**	**6**
Andrew Gilding 92.28	4
14	Dimitri Van den Bergh 98.29	4
**Ryan Joyce 98.48**	**6**
6	Damon Heta 91.40	5
**Cameron Menzies 92.04**	**6**
11	Peter Wright 105.42	4
**Mike De Decker 105.25**	**6**

**Third round** (best of 11 legs); 23 March
**1**	**Humphries 95.96**	**6**
16	M Smith 91.66	5
**8**	**Aspinall 100.63**	**6**
Wattimena 102.08	5
Schindler 98.01	5
**13**	**Anderson 97.85**	**6**
5	Chisnall 96.51	4
**R Smith 96.67**	**6**
**2**	**van Gerwen 99.00**	**6**
van Veen 102.59	4
**7**	**Price 110.83**	**6**
Nijman 100.00	3
3	Cross 92.09	4
**Joyce 88.86**	**6**
**Menzies 90.71**	**6**
De Decker 89.23	5

**Quarter-finals** (best of 11 legs); 23 March
1	Humphries 96.37	1
**8**	**Aspinall 106.72**	**6**
**13**	**Anderson 96.19**	**6**
R Smith 95.54	5
**2**	**van Gerwen 97.93**	**6**
7	Price 107.40	4
**Joyce 99.74**	**6**
Menzies 77.14	3

**Semi-finals** (best of 13 legs); 23 March
**8**	**Aspinall 98.66**	**7**
13	Anderson 103.72	6
2	van Gerwen 98.24	5
**Joyce 95.91**	**7**

**Final** (best of 15 legs); 23 March
**8**	**Aspinall 98.19**	**8**
Joyce 93.71	4

== Top averages ==
The table lists all players who achieved an average of at least 100 in a match. In the case one player has multiple records, this is indicated by the number in brackets.

#	Player	Round	Average	Result
1	Jermaine Wattimena	2	111.07	Won
2	Gerwyn Price	3	110.83	Won
3	Gerwyn Price (2)	QF	107.40	Lost
4	Nathan Aspinall	QF	106.72	Won
5	Martin Schindler	2	106.78	Won
6	Ryan Searle	2	105.62	Lost
7	Peter Wright	2	105.42	Lost
8	Mike De Decker	2	105.25	Won
9	Gerwyn Price (3)	2	103.74	Won
10	Gary Anderson	SF	103.72	Lost
11	Boris Krčmar	2	102.88	Lost
12	Gian van Veen (2)	3	102.59	Lost
13	Jermaine Wattimena (2)	3	102.08	Lost
14	Chris Dobey	2	101.73	Lost
15	Luke Humphries	2	101.35	Won
16	Michael van Gerwen	2	101.23	Won
17	Nathan Aspinall (2)	3	100.63	Won
18	Gian van Veen (2)	2	100.46	Won
19	Boris Krčmar (2)	1	100.35	Won
20	Wessel Nijman	3	100.00	Lost
