= 2023 New Zealand Darts Masters =

Tournament information
- Dates: 4-5 August 2023
- Venue: Globox Arena
- Location: Hamilton
- Country: New Zealand
- Organisation(s): PDC
- Format: Legs
- Prize fund: £60,000
- Winner's share: £20,000
- High checkout: 149 Gerwyn Price

Champion(s)
- Rob Cross

The 2023 New Zealand Darts Masters was the third staging of the tournament by the Professional Darts Corporation, and the fifth entry in the 2023 World Series of Darts. The tournament featured 16 players (eight PDC players and eight regional qualifiers) and was held at the Globox Arena in Hamilton, New Zealand on 4-5 August 2023.

== Players ==
The PDC invited eight players, while there were eight Oceanic representatives. Jonny Clayton, who had been initially invited, withdrew for personal reasons; he was replaced as an invitee by Damon Heta, who had previously been listed as an Oceanic representative, was moved to the PDC list; Warren Parry was added as an Oceanic representative.

The PDC representatives were:

- Michael Smith
- Peter Wright
- Gerwyn Price
- Nathan Aspinall
- Rob Cross
- Danny Noppert
- Damon Heta
- Dimitri Van den Bergh

The Oceanic representatives were:

Qualification	Player
PDC Tour Card Holder	Simon Whitlock
DartPlayers New Zealand #1	Ben Robb
DartPlayers New Zealand #2	Haupai Puha
DartPlayers New Zealand #3	Warren Parry
DartPlayers Australia #1	Darren Penhall
DartPlayers New Zealand Qualifier	Darren Herewini
DartPlayers New Zealand Qualifier	Jonny Tata
DartPlayers New Zealand Qualifier	Kayden Milne

== Prize money ==
The total prize fund remained at £60,000.

Position (no. of players)		Prize money (Total: £60,000)
Winner	(1)	£20,000
Runner-up	(1)	£10,000
Semi-finalists	(2)	£5,000
Quarter-finalists	(4)	£2,500
First round	(8)	£1,250

== Draw ==
First round (best of 11 legs); 4 August
1	Gerwyn Price 97.21	6
Simon Whitlock 84.66	1
Danny Noppert 98.08	6
Ben Robb 98.29	2
4	Peter Wright 84.02	3
Jonny Tata 84.06	6
Rob Cross 82.80	6
Warren Parry 76.29	3
2	Michael Smith 89.63	6
Darren Penhall 88.62	5
Damon Heta 89.54	6
Darren Herewini 80.95	2
3	Dimitri Van den Bergh 98.66	2
Haupai Puha 96.27	6
Nathan Aspinall 92.63	6
Kayden Milne 87.38	2

Quarter-finals (best of 11 legs); 5 August
1	Gerwyn Price 105.64	6
Danny Noppert 97.19	1
Jonny Tata 91.14	5
Rob Cross 95.03	6
2	Michael Smith 90.07	6
Damon Heta 87.18	5
Haupai Puha 77.84	1
Nathan Aspinall 87.18	6

Semi-finals (best of 13 legs); 5 August
1	Gerwyn Price 99.86	3
Rob Cross 99.35	7
2	Michael Smith 107.45	3
Nathan Aspinall 110.22	7

Final (best of 15 legs); 5 August
Rob Cross 98.04	8
Nathan Aspinall 98.88	7
