= Nathan Aspinall =

English darts player (born 1991)

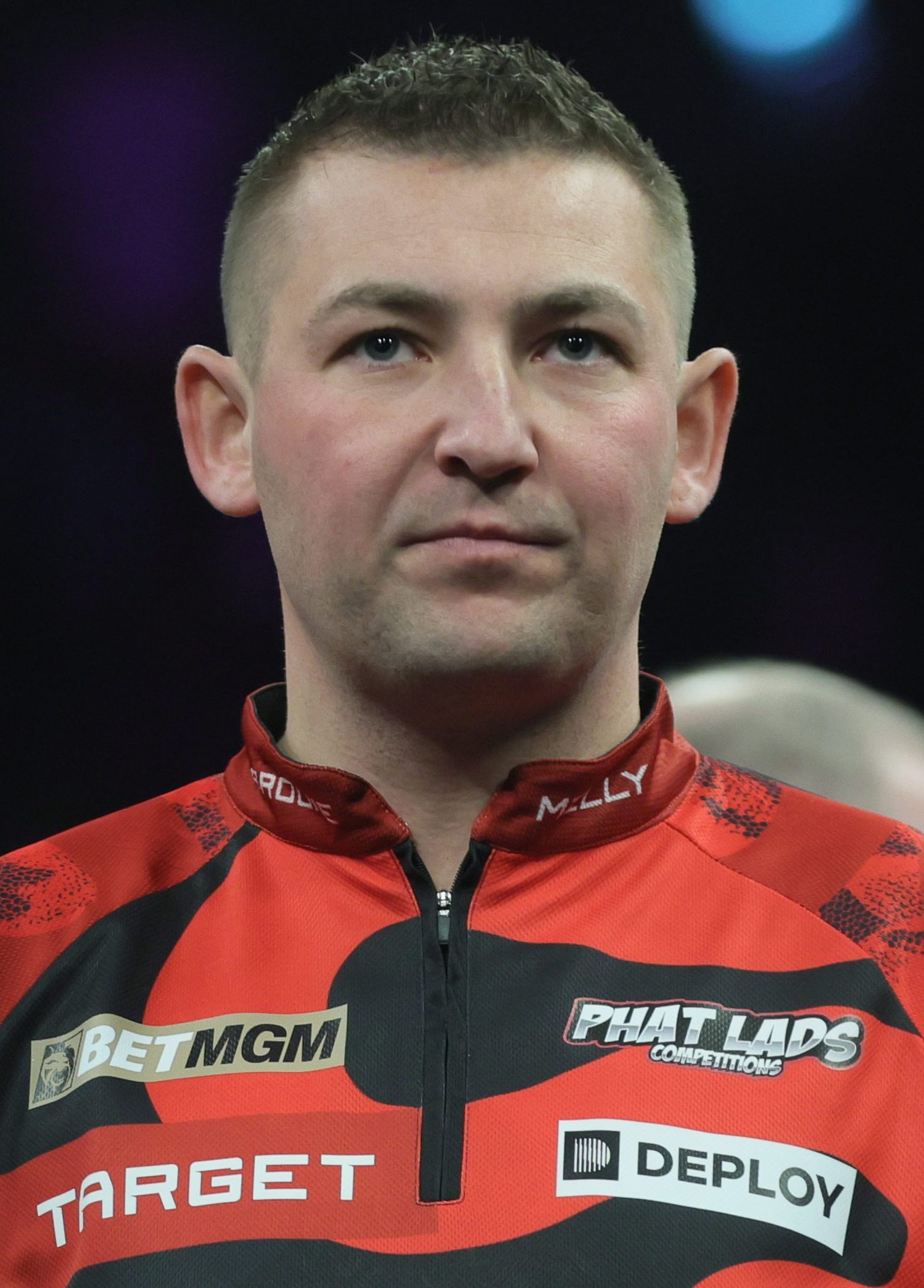
- Aspinall in 2025

Personal information
- Nickname: The Asp
- Born: 15 July 1991 (age 35) Stockport, England

Sport
- Sport: Darts
- Darts: 26g Target Signature Gen 1
- Laterality: Right-handed
- Walk-on music: "Mr. Brightside" by the Killers

Organisation (see split in darts)
- PDC: 2012–present (Tour Card: 2015–2016; 2018–present)
- Current world ranking: (PDC) 9 ▲2 (22 November 2026)

WDF major events – best performances
- World Masters: Last 272: 2013

PDC premier events – best performances
- World Championship: Semi-final: 2019, 2020
- World Matchplay: Winner (1): 2023
- World Grand Prix: Runner-up: 2022
- UK Open: Winner (1): 2019
- Grand Slam: Runner-up: 2022
- European Championship: Semi-final: 2021
- Premier League: Runner-up: 2020
- PC Finals: Runner-up: 2025
- Masters: Semi-final: 2020, 2024
- World Series Finals: Runner-up: 2023

Nathan Aspinall (born 15 July 1991) is an English professional darts player who competes in Professional Darts Corporation (PDC) events, where he is ranked world number nine; he reached a peak ranking of world number four in 2024. Nicknamed "the Asp", he has won two PDC major televised titles: the UK Open in 2019 and the World Matchplay in 2023. Aspinall has won a total of 12 PDC titles in his professional career, including four European Tour titles. He won his first World Series of Darts title at the 2019 US Darts Masters.

In the PDC World Darts Championship, Aspinall is a two-time semi-finalist with back-to-back semi-final appearances in 2019 and 2020.

== Early life ==
Aspinall played semi-professional football as a goalkeeper, having once been scouted by Manchester United's academy. He was offered a deal by Rangers but turned it down as his family did not want to move to Scotland. He played in Stockport County's academy until he was 15, joining Cheadle Town. He worked as a trainee accountant before quitting to become a professional darts player.

== Career ==
Aspinall began playing in PDC Development and Challenge Tour events in 2012. His first semi-final in those came in 2013, where he lost 4–2 to Max Hopp. He won a two-year PDC Tour Card in 2015 through the Q School Order of Merit and qualified for the UK Open, where he beat Chris Dobey 5–1 and James Richardson 9–4, before losing 4–9 to James Wade in the fourth round. Aspinall's first European Tour appearance was at the Dutch Darts Masters and he squeezed past Jamie Robinson and Vincent van der Voort both 6–5. In the third round Justin Pipe eliminated him 6–4. Aspinall won the seventh Development Tour event of 2015 with a 4–2 victory over Benito van de Pas. He also lost in the final of two other events during the year. Aspinall made his first televised appearance in the final of the 2015 PDC World Youth Championship, where he played the German Max Hopp. After 10 legs of holding throw, the final deciding leg was thrown by Aspinall, and despite having match darts, it was Hopp who won 6–5.

While throwing a dart, Aspinall often stops to grip it differently. Commentators and others have suggested that this is due to dartitis. Michael van Gerwen indicated in 2022 that, during a match, he thought his opponent was suffering from this problem. Aspinall himself invariably denies during interviews that the hiccups have a mental cause. However, he later openly admitted to having the condition, having first encountered it during a Premier League match against Peter Wright in 2023.

=== 2016 ===
Aspinall was beaten 6–5 by Stuart Kellett in the second round of the 2016 UK Open. At the sixth Players Championship he reached his first quarter-final on the main tour and narrowly lost 6–5 against Vincent van der Voort. Aspinall qualified for his first Grand Slam of Darts, but could not get a win out of his group fixtures with Raymond van Barneveld, Mensur Suljović and Danny Noppert to finish bottom of his group.

=== 2018 ===
Aspinall won his first ranking PDC title in September 2018, beating Ryan Searle 6–4 in the final of Players Championship 18, in Barnsley.

Aspinall made his Players Championship Finals debut at the 2018 edition as the 25th seed. He defeated 40th seed Martin Schindler 6–1 in the first round but lost to 8th seed James Wade 6–4 in the second round.

=== 2019: UK Open champion ===
At the 2019 World Championship, Aspinall made his debut as a ProTour Order of Merit qualifier. He was made a 500/1 outsider before the tournament. In the first round he whitewashed Geert Nentjes 3–0 before defeating the 6th seed Gerwyn Price 3–2 in a deciding set in the second round. Aspinall then defeated Kyle Anderson 4–1, Devon Petersen 4–3 and Brendan Dolan 5–1 on his way to the semi-finals, where he lost to Michael Smith 6–3.

Following Gary Anderson's withdrawal from the 2019 Premier League, Aspinall was selected as one of nine 'contenders' to replace him. He played a one-off match against Michael Smith on night six in Nottingham, losing 7–2.

Aspinall won his first PDC major at the 2019 UK Open, defeating Toni Alcinas, Christian Kist, Madars Razma, Steve Lennon, Ross Smith and Gerwyn Price to reach the final, where he defeated Rob Cross 11–5 to take the title, winning the final leg with a 170 checkout. The win took Aspinall into the top 16 of the PDC Order of Merit for the first time in his career.

Aspinall won his second televised title at the 2019 US Darts Masters, the first event on the 2019 World Series of Darts. It was Aspinall's first World Series event, and the only one he was selected to compete in during the 2019 edition. In the first round, he defeated Shawn Brenneman 6–2 before achieving wins over Rob Cross 8–5, and Peter Wright 8–7 in a last leg decider. Aspinall averaged 106.70 in the final, defeating Michael Smith 8-4. Aspinall received £20,000 in prize money for his victory.

He made his debut at the World Matchplay at the 2019 event. He was the first player to make his World Matchplay debut as a seed since Simon Whitlock in 2010. He lost to Mervyn King in the first round 10-5 despite averaging 103.

=== 2020 ===
At the 2020 World Championship, Aspinall once again reached the semi-finals. He defeated Gary Anderson before a 5–3 win over Dimitri Van den Bergh in the quarter-finals en route to the last four. He fell to defending champion Michael van Gerwen 6–3.

Aspinall followed his second world championship semi-final by reaching the semi-finals of the Masters, where he was beaten 11–10 by Michael Smith in a deciding leg. He was selected for his Premier League Darts debut season as part of the 2020 lineup after competing as a 'contender' the previous year. He qualified for the play-offs by finishing third in the league stage table. He defeated reigning world champion Peter Wright 10–7 in the semi-finals to set up a clash with fellow Premier League debutant Glen Durrant in the final. Aspinall succumbed to an 11–8 defeat to Durrant.

=== 2021 ===
At the 2021 World Championship, Aspinall came back from 2–0 down to beat Scott Waites 3–2 in the second round. He was eliminated from the tournament before the semi-finals for the first time as he lost 4–2 in the third round to Vincent van der Voort.

Aspinall finished third in the 2021 Premier League's league phase, losing 8–3 to José de Sousa on night 16 who took second place. The two met in the play-off semi-finals, with De Sousa beating Aspinall 10–9 in a deciding leg. He reached the quarter-finals of the World Matchplay, where he was defeated 16–9 by Michael van Gerwen. He then reached the semi-finals of the European Championship but lost 11–10 to Van Gerwen.

=== 2022 ===
Despite suffering with tendonitis, Aspinall was able to win his opening match at the 2022 World Championship, recovering from 2–1 down to defeat Joe Murnan, who had a dart to win the match. He was whitewashed 4–0 in the third round by Callan Rydz. He then withdrew from the Masters due to injury.

Aspinall reached the quarter-finals of the World Matchplay, where he was eliminated by Michael van Gerwen in a narrow 16–14 defeat. He also won two ranking titles during the year. He claimed the Players Championship 13 title with an 8–6 triumph over Matt Campbell in the final. He added a second Players Championship victory in the 22nd event, defeating Krzysztof Ratajski 8–3 in the final.

At the World Grand Prix in October, Aspinall reached the final following a 4–2 win over Gerwyn Price in the semi-finals, setting up a match against Michael van Gerwen for the prize. Despite briefly rallying from 4–0 down, he finally succumbed to a 5–3 defeat to Van Gerwen. The next month, he reached his second major final of the year at the Grand Slam of Darts, where he lost 16–5 to Michael Smith.

=== 2023: World Matchplay champion ===
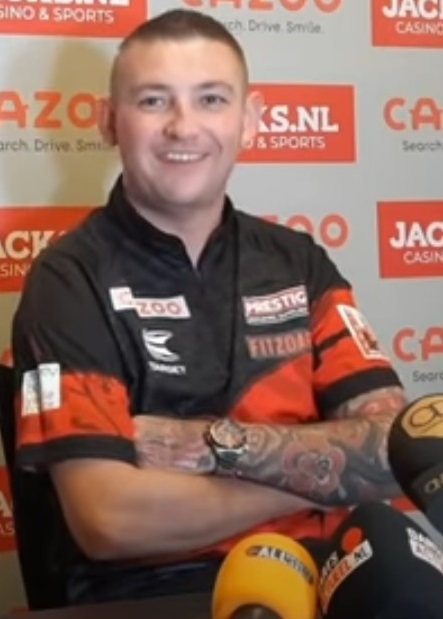
Aspinall in 2023

At the 2023 World Championship, Aspinall won his opening match 3–1 against Boris Krčmar. He lost 4–3 in the third round to Josh Rock.

Aspinall was a quarter-finalist at the UK Open, where he was beaten 10–6 by eventual runner-up Michael van Gerwen. He reached a sole 2023 European Tour final at the German Darts Grand Prix, losing 8–5 to Michael Smith. During the 2023 Premier League, he achieved his first nightly win on night 12 in Rotterdam. He got past Michael van Gerwen and Dimitri Van den Bergh to reach the final, where he defeated Gerwyn Price 6–4. He finished the league phase in fifth place, missing out on qualifying for the play-offs by failing to reach the final on night 16.

In July, Aspinall won a second major title at the World Matchplay. His run to the final included wins over Krzysztof Ratajski, Danny Noppert, Chris Dobey and Joe Cullen. In the final, he won 13 of the last 14 legs to defeat Jonny Clayton 18–6.

He made the final of the New Zealand Darts Masters but lost a deciding leg to Rob Cross who won 8–7. He was denied in a final once again at the World Series Finals, losing to Michael van Gerwen 11–4.

=== 2024 ===
At the 2024 World Championship, Aspinall suffered a shock early exit, losing 3–0 in the second round to Ricky Evans.

Aspinall achieved two nightly wins during the 2024 Premier League. He picked up his first win on night five in Exeter, beating Peter Wright and world champion Luke Humphries before a 6–2 victory over Rob Cross in the final. His second nightly win came in Rotterdam on night 12 where he defeated Michael Smith 6–4 in the final. Aspinall missed out on qualification for the play-offs by losing to Smith 6–3 in their opening match on night 16, with Smith claiming the final place.

In his defence of the World Matchplay, he was eliminated in the second round after an 11–8 loss to James Wade. Prior to the tournament, Aspinall admitted that due to a tennis elbow-like injury, he would be taking a break following his title defence. This resulted in him withdrawing from the World Series Finals in September. At the Players Championship Finals in November, he defeated number one seed Chris Dobey 6–1 in the first round, before exiting the tournament in a 6–3 defeat to Niels Zonneveld.

=== 2025 ===
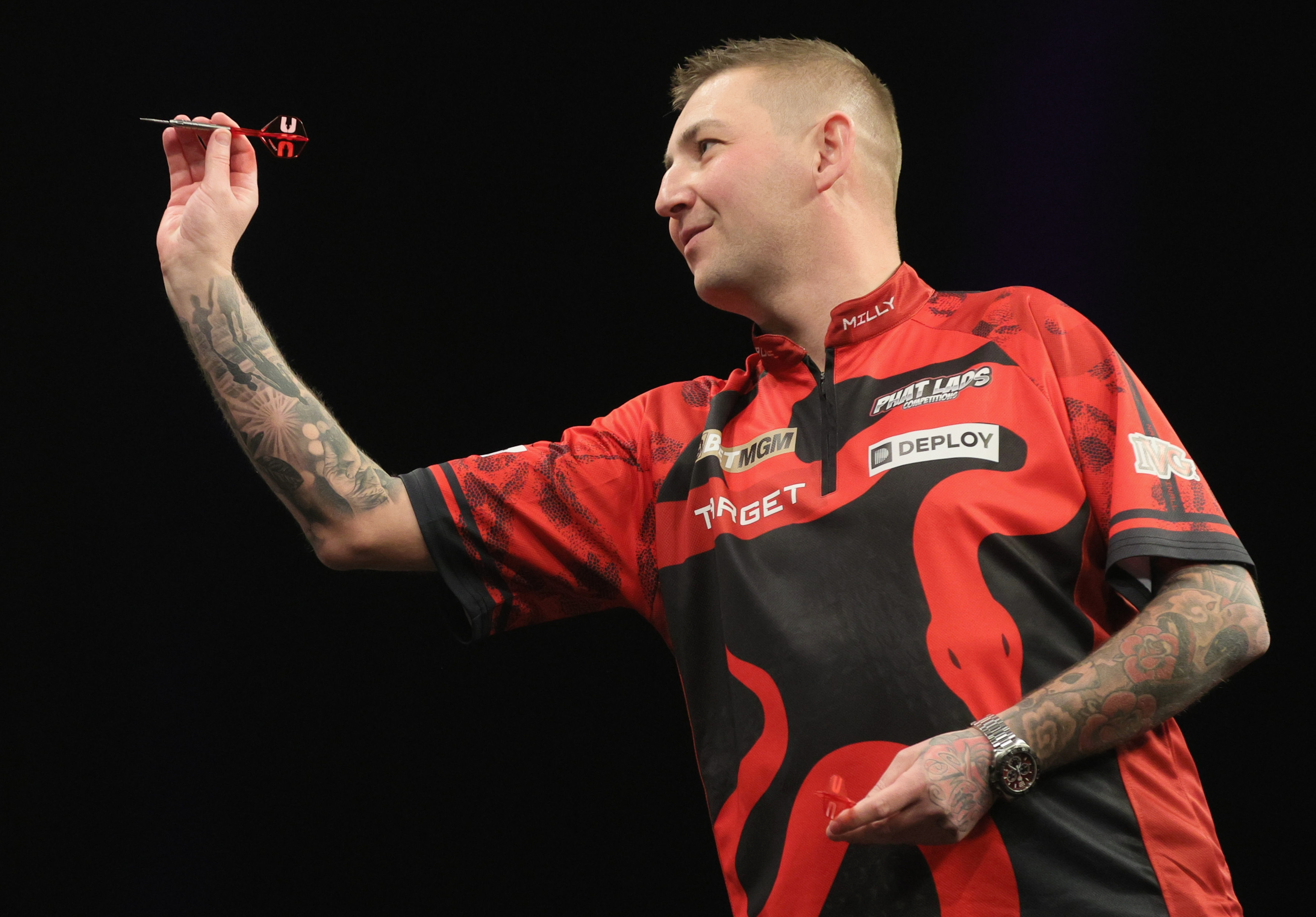
Aspinall on night nine of the 2025 Premier League

Entering the second round of the 2025 World Championship as 12th seed, Aspinall began his campaign with a 3–1 win over Leonard Gates. After the match, Aspinall stated that he wanted to prove how good he was and go deep in the tournament after facing scrutiny for recent poor performances. He defeated Andrew Gilding 4–0 before dispatching Ricardo Pietreczko by the same scoreline to progress to the quarter-finals. Aspinall was denied a third Alexandra Palace semi-final by Luke Littler, to whom he lost 5–2.

Aspinall reached his second European Tour final at the European Darts Trophy after defeating Gary Anderson in the semi-finals. He won the final 8–4 against Ryan Joyce to claim his first European Tour title. He reached the final of the next European Tour event – the International Darts Open – but was unable to achieve back-to-back wins, losing 8–5 to Stephen Bunting. Aspinall earned his first nightly win in the 2025 Premier League on night 10, triumphing 6–4 against the world number one Luke Humphries in the final. A second nightly win on night 15 saw Aspinall edge closer to a place in the play-offs. His qualification was confirmed after he defeated Michael van Gerwen 6–2 in the quarter-finals on night 16. On Finals Night on 29 May, he lost 10–7 to eventual champion Humphries in the semi-finals. The following weekend, he reached his third European Tour final of the year at the European Darts Open. After deciding leg victories over Chris Dobey and Wessel Nijman during the last session, he defeated Damon Heta 8–6 to win his second European Tour title.

Aspinall reached the final of the US Darts Masters, but was unable to win the tournament for a second time as he lost to Luke Humphries 8–6. He capped off the 2025 European Tour season by winning a third title at the German Darts Championship, defeating Dirk van Duijvenbode 8–6 in the final and ensuring that he would be the top seed at the European Championship. He was eliminated in the second round of the European Championship by Danny Noppert.

=== 2026 ===
At the 2026 World Championship, Aspinall reached the third round of the tournament following wins over Lourence Ilagan and Leonard Gates, before he was eliminated in a 4–3 defeat to Kevin Doets. Aspinall was omitted from the 2026 Premier League lineup, which saw him miss out on a place in the tournament for the first time since 2022. He reached the final of the opening Players Championship event of the year, losing 8–6 to James Wade. At the German Darts Grand Prix, he claimed his fourth European Tour title by defeating Danny Noppert 8–5 in the final.

== Personal life ==
Aspinall is a supporter of Manchester United and his local side Stockport County. Aspinall married his wife Kirsty in August 2026; they have two daughters.

== World Championship results ==
=== PDC World Championship ===
- 2019: Semi-finals (lost to Michael Smith 3–6)
- 2020: Semi-finals (lost to Michael van Gerwen 3–6)
- 2021: Third round (lost to Vincent van der Voort 2–4)
- 2022: Third round (lost to Callan Rydz 0–4)
- 2023: Third round (lost to Josh Rock 3–4)
- 2024: Second round (lost to Ricky Evans 0–3)
- 2025: Quarter-finals (lost to Luke Littler 2–5)
- 2026: Third round (lost to Kevin Doets 3–4)

== Career finals ==
=== PDC major finals: 7 (2 titles) ===
Legend
World Matchplay (1–0)
Premier League (0–1)
UK Open (1–0)
World Grand Prix (0–1)
Grand Slam (0–1)
Players Championship Finals (0–1)
World Series of Darts Finals (0–1)

Outcome	No.	Year	Championship	Opponent in the final	Score (Note: (l) = score in legs, (s) = score in sets.)	Ref.
Winner	1.	2019	UK Open	Rob Cross	11–5 (l)	
Runner-up	1.	2020	Premier League	Glen Durrant	8–11 (l)	
Runner-up	2.	2022	World Grand Prix	Michael van Gerwen	3–5 (s)	
Runner-up	3.	2022	Grand Slam	Michael Smith	5–16 (l)	
Winner	2.	2023	World Matchplay	Jonny Clayton	18–6 (l)	
Runner-up	4.	2023	World Series of Darts Finals	Michael van Gerwen	4–11 (l)	
Runner-up	5.	2025	Players Championship Finals	Luke Littler	8–11 (l)	

=== PDC World Series finals: 3 (1 title) ===
Outcome	No.	Year	Championship	Opponent in the final	Score
Winner	1.	2019	US Darts Masters	Michael Smith	8–4 (l)
Runner-up	1.	2023	New Zealand Darts Masters	Rob Cross	7–8 (l)
Runner-up	2.	2025	US Darts Masters	Luke Humphries	6–8 (l)

== Performance timeline ==
=== PDC ===
Tournament	2015	2016	2017	2018	2019	2020	2021	2022	2023	2024	2025	2026
PDC Ranked televised events
World Championship	Did not qualify				SF	SF	3R	3R	3R	2R	QF	3R
World Masters (Note: A non-ranked event until 2025)	Did not qualify					SF	QF	WD	1R	SF	QF	2R
UK Open	4R	2R	DNQ	3R	W	4R	4R	4R	QF	5R	QF	4R
World Matchplay	Did not qualify				1R	1R	QF	QF	W	2R	1R	2R
World Grand Prix	Did not qualify				QF	1R	1R	F	1R	2R	1R	SF
European Championship	DNQ		1R	DNQ	2R	2R	SF	1R	2R	1R	2R	2R
Grand Slam (Note: A non-ranked event until 2015)	DNQ	RR	DNQ		RR	QF	DNQ	F	2R	DNQ	RR	QF
Players Championship Finals	Did not qualify			2R	1R	2R	2R	1R	DNQ	2R	F	DNQ
PDC Non-ranked televised events
Premier League	Did not participate				C	F	SF	DNP	5th	5th	SF	DNP
World Series Finals	Did not qualify				1R	QF	1R	DNP	F	WD	1R	2R
World Youth Championship	F	Did not participate										
Career statistics
Year-end ranking	102	73	64	72	12	6	14	9	4	11	14	

==== European Tour ====
Season	1	2	3	4	5	6	7	8	9	10	11	12	13	14	15
2015	Did not qualify			DDM; 3R	IDO; DNQ	EDO; 1R	Did not qualify								
2016	DDM; DNQ	GDM; 1R	Did not qualify						EDG; 2R	GDC; DNQ					
2017	GDC; DNQ	GDM; DNP	GDO; 2R	DNQ		EDM; 2R	ADO; DNQ	EDO; 1R	DDM; 3R	GDG; 3R	IDO; DNQ	EDT; 2R			
2018	EDO; DNQ	GDG; 1R	GDO; 1R	Did not qualify											
2019	EDO; DNQ	GDC; 2R	GDG; DNQ	GDO; QF	ADO; 3R	EDG; QF	DDM; 1R	DDO; 2R	CDO; 2R	ADC; 2R	EDM; 2R	IDO; QF	GDT; SF		
2020	BDC; QF	GDC; 3R	EDG; QF	IDO; 3R											
2021	HDT; 3R	GDT; SF													
2022	IDO; SF	DNP		ADO; SF	EDO; QF	CDO; 2R	EDG; DNQ	DDC; 2R	EDM; QF	HDT; SF	GDO; 2R	BDO; 3R	GDT; QF		
2023	BSD; 2R	EDO; DNQ	IDO; 3R	GDG; F	ADO; 3R	DDC; 3R	BDO; QF	CDO; QF	EDG; QF	EDM; QF	GDO; 3R	HDT; 2R	GDC; 2R		
2024	BDO; 1R	GDG; QF	IDO; 3R	EDG; WD	ADO; DNP	BSD; 1R	Withdrew				HDT; 2R	SDT; 3R	CDO; 2R		
2025	BDO; 2R	EDT; W	IDO; F	GDG; DNP	ADO; 2R	EDG; 2R	DDC; DNP	EDO; W	BSD; 3R	FDT; WD	CDO; 2R	HDT; 2R	SDT; 2R	GDC; W	
2026	PDO; 3R	EDT; WD	BDO; 2R	GDG; W	EDG; QF	ADO; DNP	IDO; DNP	BSD; 2R	SDO; QF	EDO; QF	HDT; SF	CDO; 2R	FDT; QF	SDT; WD	DDC; 3R

==== Players Championships ====
Season	1	2	3	4	5	6	7	8	9	10	11	12	13	14	15	16	17	18	19	20	21	22	23	24	25	26	27	28	29	30	31	32	33	34
2015	BAR; 2R	BAR; 2R	BAR; 1R	BAR; 1R	BAR; 1R	COV; 2R	COV; 2R	COV; 2R	CRA; 1R	CRA; 2R	BAR; 1R	BAR; 2R	WIG; DNP		BAR; 2R	BAR; 1R	DUB; 1R	DUB; 1R	COV; 1R	COV; 1R														
2016	BAR; 2R	BAR; 1R	BAR; 1R	BAR; 1R	BAR; 3R	BAR; QF	BAR; 1R	COV; 1R	COV; 3R	BAR; 1R	BAR; 4R	BAR; 1R	BAR; 1R	BAR; 1R	BAR; 1R	BAR; 1R	DUB; 1R	DUB; 1R	BAR; 2R	BAR; 1R														
2017 (Note: Not a tour card holder)	Did not participate										MIL; 1R	MIL; 1R	WIG; DNP		BAR; 1R	BAR; QF	BAR; 2R	BAR; 1R	DUB; 1R	DUB; 2R	BAR; DNP	BAR; 2R												
2018	BAR; 2R	BAR; 3R	BAR; 2R	BAR; 3R	MIL; 2R	MIL; 1R	BAR; 4R	BAR; 1R	WIG; 1R	WIG; 1R	MIL; 3R	MIL; 2R	WIG; 1R	WIG; 4R	BAR; 2R	BAR; 1R	BAR; 1R	BAR; W	DUB; 3R	DUB; 2R	BAR; 3R	BAR; 2R												
2019	WIG; 2R	WIG; 1R	WIG; 2R	WIG; QF	BAR; 3R	BAR; SF	WIG; 2R	WIG; 1R	BAR; 4R	BAR; 1R	BAR; 3R	BAR; 3R	BAR; F	BAR; 3R	BAR; 2R	BAR; QF	WIG; F	WIG; 2R	BAR; 2R	BAR; 4R	HIL; 2R	HIL; 3R	BAR; 1R	BAR; 3R	BAR; F	BAR; 3R	DUB; QF	DUB; 2R	BAR; DNP					
2020	BAR; 4R	BAR; W	WIG; 3R	WIG; 3R	WIG; 4R	WIG; 3R	BAR; W	BAR; 1R	MIL; 1R	MIL; SF	MIL; 3R	MIL; 4R	MIL; QF	NIE; 3R	NIE; SF	NIE; 4R	NIE; QF	NIE; 1R	COV; 2R	COV; 1R	COV; 4R	COV; 4R	COV; 4R											
2021	BOL; SF	BOL; SF	BOL; 1R	BOL; 1R	MIL; 1R	MIL; 1R	MIL; 2R	MIL; 3R	NIE; 4R	NIE; 4R	NIE; 2R	NIE; 1R	MIL; 1R	MIL; DNP			COV; 2R	COV; 1R	COV; QF	COV; 3R	BAR; 2R	BAR; 3R	BAR; 1R	BAR; 1R	BAR; 3R	BAR; SF	BAR; QF	BAR; 2R	BAR; F	BAR; 3R				
2022	Did not participate				BAR; 3R	BAR; 2R	NIE; DNP		BAR; 1R	BAR; QF	BAR; F	BAR; 1R	BAR; W	WIG; 2R	WIG; 1R	NIE; 3R	NIE; F	BAR; SF	BAR; 1R	BAR; SF	BAR; QF	BAR; W	BAR; F	BAR; 3R	BAR; DNP		BAR; 1R	BAR; DNP	BAR; 3R	BAR; 1R				
2023	BAR; 3R	BAR; 1R	BAR; 3R	BAR; 2R	BAR; QF	BAR; 3R	Did not participate								LEI; 1R	LEI; 2R	Did not participate					BAR; 4R	BAR; 1R	BAR; 1R	BAR; 1R	BAR; 1R	Did not participate							
2024	WIG; 4R	WIG; 3R	LEI; 1R	LEI; 2R	HIL; DNP		LEI; 3R	LEI; 2R	DNP		HIL; 3R	HIL; 3R	MIL; 2R	MIL; 4R	Did not participate					WIG; 1R	WIG; 1R	MIL; 2R	MIL; 3R	WIG; 2R	WIG; 1R	WIG; 2R	WIG; 2R	WIG; 1R	LEI; 3R	LEI; 1R				
2025	WIG; 1R	WIG; 3R	ROS; 2R	ROS; 1R	LEI; DNP	LEI; 3R	HIL; DNP		LEI; 3R	LEI; 1R	LEI; DNP		ROS; F	Did not participate												HIL; 4R	HIL; 1R	LEI; 3R	LEI; 1R	LEI; 2R	WIG; F	WIG; QF	WIG; QF	WIG; 2R
2026	HIL; F	HIL; 1R	WIG; 3R	WIG; 2R	LEI; DNP		LEI; 1R	LEI; 3R	Did not participate										MIL; 1R	MIL; 3R	Did not participate						LEI; 3R	LEI; 2R	ROS; 4R	ROS; 4R	ROS; 1R	DNP		

==== World Series ====
Tournament	2019	2021	2023	2024	2025	2026
US Masters	W	NH	QF	QF	F	DNP
New Zealand Masters	DNP	NH	F	Did not participate		
Nordic Masters	NH	1R	DNP	QF	SF	DNP
Bahrain Masters	NH		DNP	QF	QF	SF
Poland Masters	NH		QF	1R	QF	NH
New South Wales Masters	NH		1R	Not held		
Dutch Masters	Not held			1R	1R	NH
Saudi Masters	Not held					SF

Performance Table Legend
W	Won the tournament	F	Finalist	SF	Semifinalist	QF	Quarterfinalist	#R; RR; Prel.	Lost in # round Round-robin; Preliminary round	DQ	Disqualified
DNQ	Did not qualify	DNP	Did not participate	WD	Withdrew	NH	Tournament not held	#R; RR; Prel.	Lost in # round Round-robin; Preliminary round	NYF	Not yet founded
