= Danny Noppert =

Dutch darts player (born 1990)

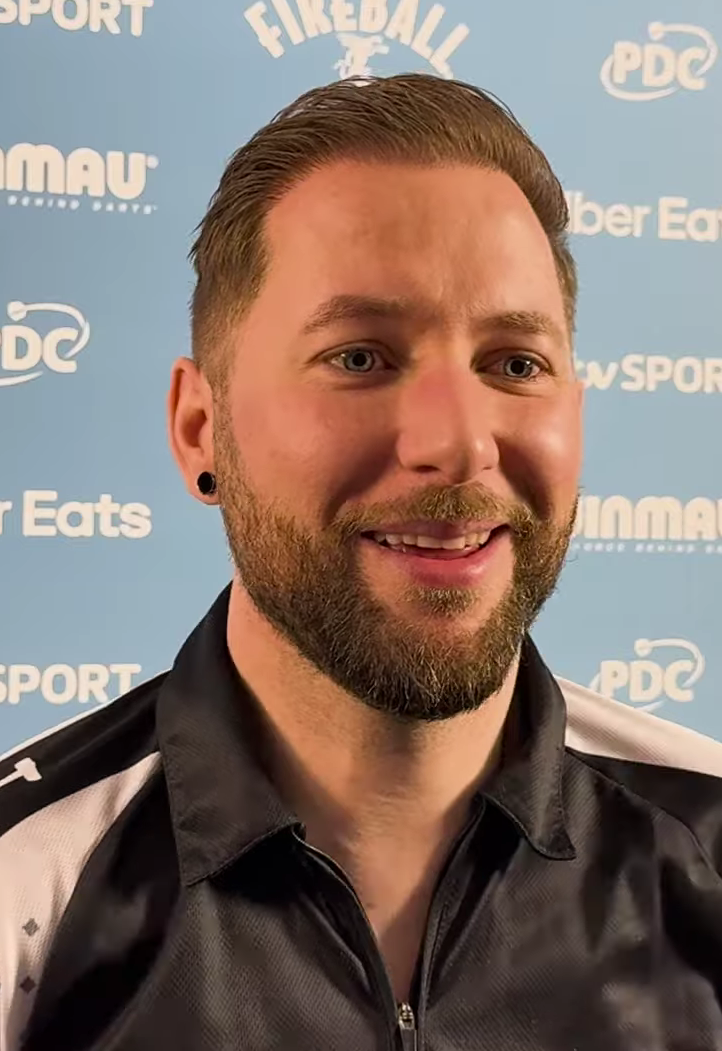
- Noppert at the 2025 World Masters

Personal information
- Nickname: "The Freeze"
- Born: 31 December 1990 (age 35) Joure, Netherlands

Sport
- Sport: Darts
- Playing since: 2009
- Darts: 23g Winmau Signature
- Laterality: Right-handed
- Walk-on music: "High Hopes" by Panic! at the Disco

Organisation (see split in darts)
- BDO: 2012–2018
- PDC: 2018–present (Tour Card: 2018–present)
- Current world ranking: (PDC) 14 ▼4 (22 November 2026)

WDF major events – best performances
- World Championship: Runner-up: 2017
- World Masters: Quarter-final: 2013
- World Trophy: Quarter-final: 2016
- Finder Masters: Winner (1): 2017

PDC premier events – best performances
- World Championship: Last 32: 2020, 2021, 2022, 2023
- World Matchplay: Semi-final: 2022
- World Grand Prix: Semi-final: 2021, 2025
- UK Open: Winner (1): 2022
- Grand Slam: Semi-final: 2025
- European Championship: Semi-final: 2023, 2024, 2025
- PC Finals: Semi-final: 2018
- Masters: Semi-final: 2025
- World Series Finals: Runner-up: 2019

Other tournament wins
- Years
| Players Championships (×5): 2018, 2022, 2023 (×2), 2024 |
Medal record
Men's Darts
Representing Netherlands
WDF Europe Cup
| Bronze medal – third place | 2014 Bucharest | Men's team |

Danny Noppert (born 31 December 1990) is a Dutch professional darts player who competes in Professional Darts Corporation (PDC) events, where he is ranked world number fourteen; he reached a peak ranking of world number six in 2025.

Previously competing in the British Darts Organisation (BDO), Noppert won his first BDO major title at the 2017 Finder Darts Masters and finished as the runner-up at the 2017 BDO World Championship. He obtained a Tour Card in 2018 and switched to the PDC, winning his first PDC major title at the 2022 UK Open by defeating Michael Smith 11–10 in the final. He has won a total 6 PDC ranking titles in his professional career.

Noppert has represented the Netherlands in the PDC World Cup of Darts on five occasions, reaching the semi-finals in 2022 with teammate Dirk van Duijvenbode and in 2025 with Gian van Veen.

== Career ==
=== 2013–2017: BDO ===
In 2013, Noppert reached the televised stages of the World Masters. He beat Jeffrey de Graaf and Dennis Nilsson 3–0 to book his place in the quarter-final, where he was beaten 3–1 by Darryl Fitton. He also made his debut at the Zuiderduin Masters. After beating Fitton 5–4 in his first match, he lost to Tony O'Shea 5–3 in the second match to be knocked out in the group stages.

In 2015, Noppert reached the last 16 of the World Masters. He also qualified for the Zuiderduin Masters. A 5–2 victory over Frans Harmsen and a 5–4 defeat to Scott Mitchell were enough to come through the group stage. He then beat Darryl Fitton 3–0 to reach the semi-finals, where he lost 3–1 to Martin Adams.

Noppert started off 2016 well by reaching the final of the Dutch Open, in which he lost to Martin Adams 3–1. Two weeks later, Noppert won the Scottish Open, beating Dean Reynolds 6–0 in the final. Noppert won also the Masters of Waregem, where he defeated Geert De Vos 3–1 in the final.

Noppert impressed during 2016 Grand Slam of Darts, beating Mensur Suljović and Nathan Aspinall before a narrow defeat in the last 16 to two-time PDC World Champion Gary Anderson 10–9.

In 2017, Noppert was able to reach the final of the 2017 BDO World Darts Championship, defeating defending champion Scott Waites on his way there. Noppert eventually lost to then-BDO world number one Glen Durrant 7–3. In December, Noppert won the Finder Darts Masters, beating Jim Williams in the final 5–3. This was Noppert's first major title.

=== 2018–2021: Move to the PDC ===
Noppert announced a move from the BDO to the Professional Darts Corporation following the 2018 BDO World Championship which saw him enter 2018 PDC Q-School. He won a Tour Card by finishing top of the European Order of Merit.

In his first year in the PDC, he won his first title in September by defeating Ian White 6–4 in the final of Players Championship 20. Two days later, he took part in his first World Grand Prix tournament. He also qualified for his first European Championship as 20th seed, where he lost to reigning world champion Rob Cross in the first round. Noppert reached his maiden PDC major semi-final at the Players Championship Finals, where he lost 11–3 to eventual champion Daryl Gurney.

Noppert made his PDC World Championship debut at the 2019 edition, entering the tournament as the highest ranked non-seed on the 2018 Pro Tour Order of Merit. He won his first-round match 3–0 against Hong Kong's Royden Lam. He was then eliminated in the second round following a 3–0 defeat to Max Hopp. Noppert also made his debut at that year's World Matchplay but he was beaten 10–6 by defending champion Gary Anderson in the opening round. In November, Noppert was invited to play at the World Series of Darts Finals in Amsterdam. He reached his first PDC televised final but lost the final 11–2 to Michael van Gerwen.

Noppert represented the Netherlands in the PDC World Cup of Darts for the first time at the 2020 edition, partnering Van Gerwen. The pair made it to the quarter-finals where they were eliminated by Gabriel Clemens and Max Hopp of Germany. At the 2021 World Grand Prix, Noppert defeated Michael van Gerwen, Vincent van der Voort and Ian White to reach the semi-finals, where he was beaten 4–1 by Jonny Clayton.

=== 2022: UK Open champion ===
Noppert was victorious in his opening match at the 2022 World Championship, winning three consecutive sets to defeat debutant Jason Heaver 3–1. He was beaten by Ryan Searle 4–2 in the third round. Noppert was set to make his Masters debut at the end of January but withdrew from the tournament to be present for the birth of his first child in the Netherlands.

In March 2022, he won his first PDC major title by winning the 2022 UK Open. He defeated Ryan Meikle, Devon Petersen, Dirk van Duijvenbode, Damon Heta, and William O'Connor on his way to the final, where he beat Michael Smith 11–10 in a last-leg decider, surviving a match dart from Smith in the process. This win saw Noppert rise to 12th on the PDC Order of Merit.

Representing the Netherlands in the World Cup of Darts alongside Dirk van Duijvenbode, the Dutch team was defeated in the semi-finals by eventual runners-up Wales, represented by Jonny Clayton and Gerwyn Price. Noppert entered the 2022 World Matchplay as the 11th seed. He defeated Brendan Dolan, Daryl Gurney, and Dirk van Duijvenbode en route to the semi-finals, where he was beaten 17–11 by Gerwyn Price.

On the Pro Tour, Noppert won his third PDC ranking title at Players Championship 19, coming back from 6–3 down to win the final 8–6 against Andrew Gilding. He also reached two European Tour finals at the Austrian Darts Open and the Dutch Darts Championship, but succumbed to defeats by Michael van Gerwen and Michael Smith.

=== 2023 ===
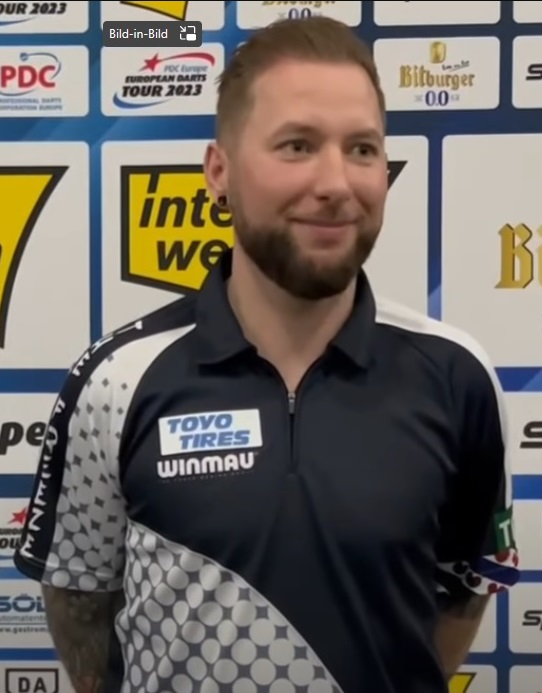
Noppert in 2023

Ninth seed Noppert began the 2023 World Championship with a 3–1 win over Canada's David Cameron in the second round. He faced Alan Soutar in the third round and took a 2–0 lead before Soutar won the next four sets to beat Noppert 4–2.

He entered the UK Open as defending champion but was eliminated in the fifth round by William O'Connor. In October, Noppert was a semi-finalist at the European Championship. His run included a comeback victory against Gerwyn Price in the quarter-finals where he recovered from 7–0 down to win 10–8. He lost 11–8 to eventual champion Peter Wright. Noppert was set to compete at the Players Championship Finals in November but withdrew from the tournament as he was expecting the birth of his second child.

On the Pro Tour, Noppert claimed his fourth and fifth PDC ranking titles, defeating Simon Whitlock 8–3 to win Players Championship 2 and Christian Kist 8–7 to win Players Championship 22.

=== 2024 ===
At the 2024 World Championship, Noppert entered the second round as seventh seed but ended up being defeated 3–0 by Scott Williams. In April, he won his sixth PDC ranking title by beating reigning world champion Luke Humphries 8–6 to win Players Championship 8. He reached another European Championship semi-final in October, losing 11–10 in a deciding leg to runner-up Jermaine Wattimena.

=== 2025 ===
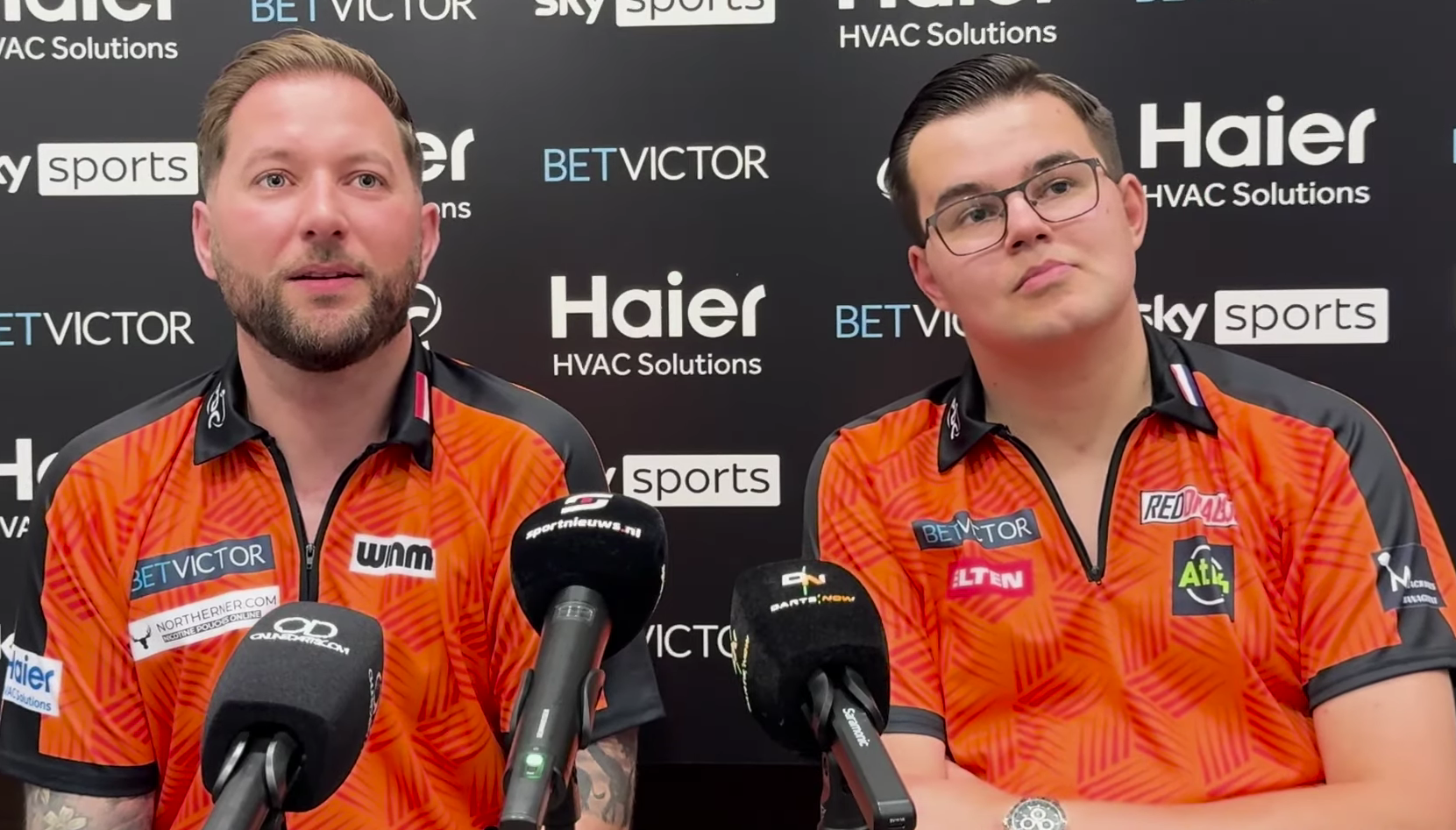
Noppert (left) and his Dutch teammate Gian van Veen at the 2025 PDC World Cup of Darts

Noppert was eliminated from the 2025 World Championship in his opening match, suffering a 3–1 defeat to Ryan Joyce. He returned to winning ways at the World Masters by reaching the semi-finals of the tournament, including a victory over defending champion Stephen Bunting in the quarter-finals. He lost 5–2 to eventual title winner Luke Humphries. Representing the Netherlands, he reached the semi-finals of the World Cup of Darts with teammate Gian van Veen, where the pair were beaten 8–5 by runners-up Wales.

Noppert was the runner-up at the Hungarian Darts Trophy in September, losing 8–7 to Niko Springer. He was a semi-finalist at the next three major events: the World Grand Prix, the European Championship and the Grand Slam.

=== 2026 ===
Noppert entered the 2026 World Championship with a career-high ranking of world number six. He won his first-round match 3–1 against Jurjen van der Velde. In the second round, Noppert trailed debutant Justin Hood 2–0 but took the match to a deciding set, which he lost in a sudden-death leg after missing a match dart. The match was described as an "epic" and an "Alexandra Palace classic" due to its high quality and dramatic play. In April, Noppert reached his fourth European Tour final at the German Darts Grand Prix, where he lost 8–5 to Nathan Aspinall.

== Personal life ==
Noppert is married; he and his wife have two children. His mother, Aleida, died in 2017; his walk-on song, "High Hopes" by Panic! at the Disco, is a tribute to her, with Noppert describing the lyric "Mama said don't give up" as an important one to him in a 2026 interview.

Noppert is nicknamed "the Freeze" due to his calmness on stage and as a reference to his home province, Friesland. In a 2025 interview, Noppert revealed he has attention deficit hyperactivity disorder (ADHD).

== World Championship results ==
=== BDO World Championship ===
- 2017: Runner-up (lost to Glen Durrant 3–7)
- 2018: Second round (lost to Mark McGeeney 1–4)

=== PDC World Championship ===
- 2019: Second round (lost to Max Hopp 0–3)
- 2020: Third round (lost to Kim Huybrechts 2–4)
- 2021: Third round (lost to Dave Chisnall 2–4)
- 2022: Third round (lost to Ryan Searle 2–4)
- 2023: Third round (lost to Alan Soutar 2–4)
- 2024: Second round (lost to Scott Williams 0–3)
- 2025: Second round (lost to Ryan Joyce 1–3)
- 2026: Second round (lost to Justin Hood 2–3)

== Career finals ==
=== BDO major finals: 2 (1 title) ===
Legend
World Championship (0–1)
Zuiderduin Masters (1–0)

| Outcome | No. | Year | Championship | Opponent in the final | Score (Note: (l) = score in legs, (s) = score in sets.) |
|---|---|---|---|---|---|
| Runner-up | 1. | 2017 | World Championship | (England) Glen Durrant | 3–7 (s) |
| Winner | 1. | 2017 | Finder Masters | (Wales) Jim Williams | 5–3 (s) |

=== PDC major finals: 2 (1 title) ===
Legend
UK Open (1–0)
World Series of Darts Finals (0–1)

| Outcome | No. | Year | Championship | Opponent in the final | Score |
|---|---|---|---|---|---|
| Runner-up | 1. | 2019 | World Series of Darts Finals | Michael van Gerwen | 2–11 (l) |
| Winner | 2 | 2022 | UK Open | Michael Smith | 11–10 (l) |

== Performance timeline ==
Danny Noppert's performance timeline is as follows:

=== BDO ===
| Tournament | 2013 | 2014 | 2015 | 2016 | 2017 | 2018 |
|---|---|---|---|---|---|---|
BDO Ranked televised events
| World Championship | Did not qualify | | | | F | 2R |
| World Trophy | NH | DNQ | | QF | 1R | PDC |
| World Masters | QF | 2R | 6R | 5R | DNP | PDC |
| Finder Masters | RR | DNQ | SF | RR | W | PDC |

=== PDC ===
| Tournament | 2016 | 2017 | 2018 | 2019 | 2020 | 2021 | 2022 | 2023 | 2024 | 2025 | 2026 |
|---|---|---|---|---|---|---|---|---|---|---|---|
PDC Ranked televised events
| World Championship | Non-PDC | | | 2R | 3R | 3R | 3R | 3R | 2R | 2R | 2R |
| World Masters (Note: A non-ranked event until 2025) | Did not qualify | | | | | | WD | QF | 2R | SF | QF |
| UK Open | Non-PDC | | 2R | 3R | 4R | 5R | W | 5R | 5R | 5R | QF |
| World Matchplay | Non-PDC | | DNQ | 1R | 2R | 1R | SF | 2R | 1R | 2R | 1R |
| World Grand Prix | Non-PDC | | 1R | 2R | 2R | SF | 2R | 1R | 1R | SF | 2R |
| European Championship | Non-PDC | | 1R | DNQ | 1R | QF | QF | SF | SF | SF | 1R |
| Grand Slam | 2R | RR | DNQ | RR | DNQ | | 2R | 2R | 2R | SF | DNQ |
| Players Championship Finals | Non-PDC | | SF | 2R | 2R | 3R | QF | WD | 3R | 3R | |
PDC Non-ranked televised events
| World Cup | Did not participate | | | | QF | DNP | SF | 2R | 2R | SF | DNP |
| World Series Finals | Did not qualify | | | F | DNQ | 1R | 2R | 2R | 2R | 2R | 1R |
Career statistics
| Season-end ranking | Non-PDC | | 46 | 27 | 25 | 18 | 8 | 7 | 13 | 10 | |

==== European Tour ====
| Season | 1 | 2 | 3 | 4 | 5 | 6 | 7 | 8 | 9 | 10 | 11 | 12 | 13 | 14 | 15 |
|---|---|---|---|---|---|---|---|---|---|---|---|---|---|---|---|
| 2018 | EDO; 2R | GDG; 2R | GDO; 2R | ADO; DNQ | EDG; SF | Did not qualify | | | | GDC; 1R | DDC; DNQ | IDO; SF | EDT; 1R | | |
| 2019 | EDO; DNQ | GDC; DNQ | GDG; 2R | Did not qualify | | | DDM; 2R | DDO; DNQ | CDO; 3R | ADC; DNQ | EDM; DNQ | IDO; 2R | GDT; 2R | | |
| 2020 | BDC; 3R | GDC; SF | EDG; DNQ | IDO; QF | | | | | | | | | | | |
| 2021 | HDT; WD | GDT; 3R | | | | | | | | | | | | | |
| 2022 | IDO; QF | GDC; DNP | GDG; DNP | ADO; F | EDO; DNQ | CDO; DNQ | EDG; QF | DDC; F | EDM; 1R | HDT; 2R | GDO; 2R | BDO; SF | GDT; 2R | | |
| 2023 | BSD; 2R | EDO; SF | IDO; 3R | GDG; QF | ADO; QF | DDC; QF | BDO; 3R | CDO; 3R | EDG; 2R | EDM; 3R | GDO; QF | HDT; 3R | GDC; 2R | | |
| 2024 | BDO; 3R | GDG; QF | IDO; QF | EDG; 3R | ADO; QF | BSD; SF | DDC; QF | EDO; 2R | GDC; 3R | FDT; 3R | HDT; 3R | SDT; 2R | CDO; 2R | | |
| 2025 | BDO; 2R | EDT; 2R | IDO; 2R | GDG; 2R | ADO; 3R | EDG; 3R | DDC; QF | EDO; 2R | BSD; QF | FDT; QF | CDO; 2R | HDT; F | SDT; 3R | GDC; QF | |
| 2026 | PDO; 2R | EDT; 3R | BDO; QF | GDG; F | EDG; QF | ADO; 3R | IDO; 2R | BSD; 2R | SDO; 3R | EDO; 2R | HDT; SF | CDO; QF | FDT; QF | SDT; 2R | DDC; F |

==== Players Championships ====
| Season | 1 | 2 | 3 | 4 | 5 | 6 | 7 | 8 | 9 | 10 | 11 | 12 | 13 | 14 | 15 | 16 | 17 | 18 | 19 | 20 | 21 | 22 | 23 | 24 | 25 | 26 | 27 | 28 | 29 | 30 | 31 | 32 | 33 | 34 |
|---|---|---|---|---|---|---|---|---|---|---|---|---|---|---|---|---|---|---|---|---|---|---|---|---|---|---|---|---|---|---|---|---|---|---|
| 2018 | BAR; 4R | BAR; 4R | BAR; 4R | BAR; 2R | MIL; 1R | MIL; 2R | BAR; 1R | BAR; 3R | WIG; 1R | WIG; 4R | MIL; 4R | MIL; 2R | WIG; 3R | WIG; 4R | BAR; 1R | BAR; QF | BAR; 1R | BAR; 2R | DUB; 2R | DUB; W | BAR; 3R | BAR; 1R | | | | | | | | | | | | |
| 2019 | WIG; 1R | WIG; 1R | WIG; 2R | WIG; 2R | BAR; SF | BAR; SF | WIG; 1R | WIG; 1R | BAR; 4R | BAR; 2R | BAR; 1R | BAR; QF | BAR; 4R | BAR; 1R | BAR; 4R | BAR; QF | WIG; 4R | WIG; 2R | BAR; 1R | BAR; 1R | HIL; SF | HIL; 1R | BAR; 4R | BAR; 2R | BAR; 2R | BAR; 3R | DUB; 4R | DUB; 3R | BAR; 2R | BAR; SF | | | | |
| 2020 | BAR; 2R | BAR; 3R | WIG; QF | WIG; SF | WIG; 2R | WIG; 3R | BAR; SF | BAR; 2R | MIL; QF | MIL; 1R | MIL; 3R | MIL; 3R | MIL; 3R | NIE; 3R | NIE; 4R | NIE; QF | NIE; 4R | NIE; 4R | COV; 4R | COV; 4R | COV; 2R | COV; 2R | COV; 2R | | | | | | | | | | | |
| 2021 | BOL; 2R | BOL; 3R | BOL; SF | BOL; 4R | MIL; 1R | MIL; 3R | MIL; 3R | MIL; 3R | NIE; 3R | NIE; 3R | NIE; 2R | NIE; SF | MIL; 3R | MIL; 1R | MIL; 3R | MIL; 1R | COV; 4R | COV; 3R | COV; 4R | COV; QF | BAR; 1R | BAR; 2R | BAR; 3R | BAR; 1R | BAR; 2R | BAR; 2R | BAR; 2R | BAR; 4R | BAR; 2R | BAR; QF | | | | |
| 2022 | DNP | | | | BAR; 3R | BAR; SF | NIE; 1R | NIE; 4R | BAR; SF | BAR; 2R | BAR; 2R | BAR; 2R | BAR; 2R | WIG; 2R | WIG; 2R | NIE; 4R | NIE; 3R | BAR; 2R | BAR; W | BAR; 1R | BAR; 4R | BAR; SF | BAR; 4R | BAR; 2R | BAR; 3R | BAR; 4R | BAR; 2R | BAR; 1R | BAR; DNP | BAR; DNP | | | | |
| 2023 | BAR; 4R | BAR; W | BAR; 4R | BAR; 1R | BAR; 2R | BAR; 3R | HIL; 2R | HIL; 1R | WIG; 3R | WIG; 1R | LEI; 2R | LEI; 1R | HIL; 3R | HIL; QF | LEI; 3R | LEI; 4R | HIL; DNP | HIL; DNP | BAR; 2R | BAR; 4R | BAR; QF | BAR; W | BAR; 2R | BAR; DNP | BAR; QF | BAR; 1R | BAR; 2R | BAR; 1R | BAR; 2R | BAR; QF | | | | |
| 2024 | WIG; 2R | WIG; 1R | LEI; QF | LEI; 1R | HIL; QF | HIL; 1R | LEI; 2R | LEI; W | HIL; 1R | HIL; QF | HIL; 3R | HIL; SF | MIL; 2R | MIL; 1R | MIL; 4R | MIL; 2R | MIL; 2R | MIL; QF | MIL; QF | WIG; 1R | WIG; 3R | LEI; 4R | LEI; 1R | WIG; 4R | WIG; 3R | WIG; QF | WIG; 3R | WIG; SF | LEI; SF | LEI; 3R | | | | |
| 2025 | WIG; 4R | WIG; 4R | ROS; 2R | ROS; 1R | LEI; 1R | LEI; 1R | HIL; 1R | HIL; 3R | LEI; 2R | LEI; 3R | LEI; 3R | LEI; 4R | ROS; 2R | ROS; SF | HIL; SF | HIL; QF | LEI; 3R | LEI; 3R | LEI; 1R | LEI; 4R | LEI; 3R | HIL; SF | HIL; 4R | MIL; 1R | MIL; 3R | HIL; QF | HIL; SF | LEI; 2R | LEI; QF | LEI; 2R | WIG; DNP | | | WIG; 4R |
| 2026 | HIL; 1R | HIL; QF | WIG; 4R | WIG; 2R | LEI; 4R | LEI; 4R | LEI; 3R | LEI; 2R | WIG; 1R | WIG; 1R | MIL; 3R | MIL; 3R | HIL; 2R | HIL; SF | LEI; DNP | | LEI; SF | LEI; 3R | MIL; 1R | MIL; 4R | WIG; 3R | WIG; 1R | LEI; 2R | LEI; QF | HIL; DNP | | LEI; 1R | LEI; 4R | ROS; 4R | ROS; 2R | ROS; 3R | ROS; 2R | LEI; QF | LEI; QF |

==== World Series ====
| Tournament | 2022 | 2023 | 2024 | 2025 | 2026 |
|---|---|---|---|---|---|
| Dutch Masters | QF | NH | QF | 1R | NH |
| Poland Masters | NH | QF | DNP | | NH |
| New Zealand Masters | DNP | QF | DNP | | |
| New South Wales Masters | DNP | QF | Not held | | |
| Bahrain Masters | NH | DNP | | | QF |
| Saudi Masters | Not held | | | | 1R |

Performance Table Legend
| W | Won the tournament | F | Finalist | SF | Semifinalist | QF | Quarterfinalist | #R; RR; Prel. | Lost in # round Round-robin; Preliminary round | DQ | Disqualified |
| DNQ | Did not qualify | DNP | Did not participate | WD | Withdrew | NH | Tournament not held | #R; RR; Prel. | Lost in # round Round-robin; Preliminary round | NYF | Not yet founded |
