= 2023 World Matchplay =

Darts competition

2023 Betfred World Matchplay

Tournament information
- Dates: 15–23 July 2023
- Venue: Winter Gardens
- Location: Blackpool, England
- Organisation(s): Professional Darts Corporation (PDC)
- Format: Legs
- Prize fund: £800,000
- Winner's share: £200,000
- High checkout: 170; Rob Cross; Jonny Clayton; Nathan Aspinall

Champion(s)
- Nathan Aspinall (ENG)

The 2023 World Matchplay (known for sponsorship reasons as the 2023 Betfred World Matchplay) was a professional darts tournament that was held at the Winter Gardens in Blackpool, England, from 15 to 23 July 2023. It was the 30th staging of the World Matchplay by the Professional Darts Corporation (PDC). The total prize fund was £800,000, with the winner receiving £200,000. The second edition of the Women's World Matchplay also took place on 23 July and was won by Beau Greaves.

The tournament, sponsored by Betfred, featured 32 players: the top 16 players on the two-year PDC Order of Merit and the top 16 players from the one-year PDC Pro Tour Order of Merit who had not yet qualified.

Michael van Gerwen was the defending champion, after winning his third World Matchplay title in 2022, defeating Gerwyn Price 18–14, but was eliminated in the first round, losing 10–7 to Brendan Dolan.

Nathan Aspinall won his first World Matchplay title and second Premier title overall, defeating Jonny Clayton 18–6 in the final.

The 2023 Women's World Matchplay also took place during the event, as Beau Greaves won her first televised championship by defeating Mikuru Suzuki 6–1 in the final.

== Prize money ==
The prize fund remained at £800,000, with £200,000 going to the winner.

| Position (no. of players) | | Prize money (Total: £800,000) |
|---|---|---|
| Winner | (1) | £200,000 |
| Runner-up | (1) | £100,000 |
| Semi-finalists | (2) | £50,000 |
| Quarter-finalists | (4) | £30,000 |
| Second round | (8) | £15,000 |
| First round | (16) | £10,000 |

== Format ==
All matches had to be won by two clear legs, with a match being extended if necessary for a maximum of six extra legs before a tie-break leg is required. For example, in a first to 10 legs first round match, if the score had reached 12–12 then the 25th leg would have been the decider.

| Round | First to (legs) |
|---|---|
| First | 10 |
| Second | 11 |
| Quarter-finals | 16 |
| Semi-finals | 17 |
| Final | 18 |

== Qualification ==
The top 16 players on the PDC Order of Merit at the cut-off point on 11 July were seeded for the tournament. The top 16 players on the ProTour Order of Merit, not to have already qualified on the cut-off date were unseeded.

The following players qualified for the tournament:

=== PDC Order of Merit ===
1. Michael Smith (second round)
2. Peter Wright (second round)
3. Michael van Gerwen (first round)
4. Gerwyn Price (second round)
5. Rob Cross (first round)
6. Luke Humphries (semi-finals)
7. Jonny Clayton (runner-up)
8. Danny Noppert (second round)
9. Nathan Aspinall (champion)
10. Dimitri Van den Bergh (second round)
11. Dirk van Duijvenbode (second round)
12. Dave Chisnall (first round)
13. Joe Cullen (semi-finals)
14. Damon Heta (quarter-finals)
15. Ryan Searle (quarter-finals)
16. James Wade (first round)

=== PDC ProTour Qualifiers ===
1. Josh Rock (first round)
2. Martin Schindler (first round)
3. Ross Smith (first round)
4. Krzysztof Ratajski (first round)
5. José de Sousa (first round)
6. Andrew Gilding (first round)
7. Gary Anderson (second round)
8. Stephen Bunting (first round)
9. Gabriel Clemens (first round)
10. Chris Dobey (quarter-finals)
11. Raymond van Barneveld (first round)
12. Daryl Gurney (quarter-finals)
13. Mike De Decker (first round)
14. Steve Beaton (first round)
15. Brendan Dolan (second round)
16. Kim Huybrechts (first round)

== Schedule ==
Saturday, 15 July

| Match # | Round | Player 1 | Score | Player 2 | Break 1 | Break 2 |
|---|---|---|---|---|---|---|
| 01 | 1 | Joe Cullen 100.67 | 10 – 7 | Mike De Decker 91.86 | 4 – 1 | 7 – 3 |
| 02 | 1 | Rob Cross 98.08 | 10 – 12 | Daryl Gurney 95.33 | 1 – 4 | 4 – 6 |
| 03 | 1 | Gerwyn Price 96.88 | 10 – 3 | Stephen Bunting 92.34 | 3 – 2 | 7 – 3 |
| 04 | 1 | Dave Chisnall 91.49 | 6 – 10 | Gary Anderson 94.07 | 3 – 2 | 3 – 7 |

Sunday, 16 July

| Match # | Round | Player 1 | Score | Player 2 | Break 1 | Break 2 |
|---|---|---|---|---|---|---|
| 05 | 1 | Danny Noppert 94.73 | 10 – 8 | Martin Schindler 88.57 | 3 – 2 | 7 – 3 |
| 06 | 1 | Dirk van Duijvenbode 95.52 | 12 – 10 | Kim Huybrechts 93.08 | 3 – 2 | 5 – 5 |
| 07 | 1 | Damon Heta 94.16 | 10 – 5 | Josh Rock 95.53 | 3 – 2 | 7 – 3 |
| 08 | 1 | James Wade 97.42 | 8 – 10 | Chris Dobey 96.22 | 1 – 4 | 4 – 6 |
| 09 | 1 | Nathan Aspinall 98.60 | 10 – 7 | Krzysztof Ratajski 96.78 | 3 – 2 | 6 – 4 |
| 10 | 1 | Luke Humphries 101.78 | 10 – 2 | José de Sousa 94.30 | 4 – 1 | 8 – 2 |
| 11 | 1 | Michael van Gerwen 98.98 | 7 – 10 | Brendan Dolan 95.50 | 1 – 4 | 5 – 5 |
| 12 | 1 | Michael Smith 88.96 | 10 – 2 | Steve Beaton 81.54 | 4 – 1 | 8 – 2 |

Monday, 17 July

| Match # | Round | Player 1 | Score | Player 2 | Break 1 | Break 2 |
|---|---|---|---|---|---|---|
| 13 | 1 | Dimitri Van den Bergh 101.24 | 10 – 8 | Ross Smith 90.71 | 2 – 3 | 5 – 5 |
| 14 | 1 | Ryan Searle 105.19 | 10 – 4 | Raymond van Barneveld 89.59 | 3 – 2 | 7 – 2 |
| 15 | 1 | Peter Wright 96.41 | 10 – 4 | Andrew Gilding 87.91 | 3 – 2 | 7 – 2 |
| 16 | 1 | Jonny Clayton 87.91 | 10 – 8 | Gabriel Clemens 94.51 | 4 – 1 | 7 – 3 |

Tuesday, 18 July

| Match # | Round | Player 1 | Score | Player 2 | Break 1 | Break 2 |
|---|---|---|---|---|---|---|
| 17 | 2 | Daryl Gurney 104.43 | 11 – 4 | Gary Anderson 102.47 | 5 – 0 | 8 – 2 |
| 18 | 2 | Danny Noppert 91.68 | 9 – 11 | Nathan Aspinall 98.07 | 2 – 3 | 4 – 6 |
| 19 | 2 | Gerwyn Price 100.31 | 11 – 13 | Joe Cullen 94.33 | 1 – 4 | 4 – 6 |
| 20 | 2 | Michael Smith 99.81 | 7 – 11 | Chris Dobey 98.24 | 3 – 2 | 5 – 5 |

Wednesday, 19 July

| Match # | Round | Player 1 | Score | Player 2 | Break 1 | Break 2 |
|---|---|---|---|---|---|---|
| 21 | 2 | Brendan Dolan 89.08 | 1 – 11 | Damon Heta 95.68 | 0 – 5 | 1 – 9 |
| 22 | 2 | Jonny Clayton 101.90 | 11 – 6 | Dimitri Van den Bergh 93.49 | 3 – 2 | 6 – 4 |
| 23 | 2 | Peter Wright 91.90 | 8 – 11 | Ryan Searle 95.22 | 2 – 3 | 4 – 6 |
| 24 | 2 | Luke Humphries 95.17 | 14 – 12 | Dirk van Duijvenbode 93.04 | 2 – 3 | 5 – 5 |

Thursday, 20 July

| Match # | Round | Player 1 | Score | Player 2 | Break 1 | Break 2 | Break 3 | Break 4 |
|---|---|---|---|---|---|---|---|---|
| 25 | QF | Joe Cullen 97.11 | 16 – 11 | Daryl Gurney 92.18 | 5 – 0 | 7 – 3 | 9 – 6 | 12 – 8 |
| 26 | QF | Chris Dobey 96.79 | 12 – 16 | Nathan Aspinall 99.33 | 3 – 2 | 6 – 4 | 7 – 8 | 8 – 12 |

Friday, 21 July

| Match # | Round | Player 1 | Score | Player 2 | Break 1 | Break 2 | Break 3 | Break 4 |
|---|---|---|---|---|---|---|---|---|
| 27 | QF | Ryan Searle 94.72 | 12 – 16 | Jonny Clayton 97.55 | 3 – 2 | 5 – 5 | 8 – 7 | 9 – 11 |
| 28 | QF | Damon Heta 93.22 | 13 – 16 | Luke Humphries 95.50 | 2 – 3 | 5 – 5 | 6 – 9 | 8 – 12 |

Saturday, 22 July

| Match # | Round | Player 1 | Score | Player 2 | Break 1 | Break 2 | Break 3 | Break 4 |
|---|---|---|---|---|---|---|---|---|
| 29 | SF | Nathan Aspinall 95.26 | 17 – 9 | Joe Cullen 91.22 | 3 – 2 | 6 – 4 | 10 – 5 | 13 – 7 |
| 30 | SF | Jonny Clayton 98.92 | 17 – 15 | Luke Humphries 95.86 | 2 – 3 | 4 – 6 | 7 – 8 | 9 – 11 |

Sunday, 23 July

| Match # | Round | Player 1 | Score | Player 2 | Break 1 | Break 2 | Break 3 | Break 4 |
|---|---|---|---|---|---|---|---|---|
| 31 | F | Nathan Aspinall 96.21 | 18 – 6 | Jonny Clayton 93.56 | 3 – 2 | 5 – 5 | 10 – 5 | 15 – 5 |

== Draw ==
First round (best of 19 legs); 15–17 July
1 | Michael Smith 88.96 | 10
Steve Beaton 81.54 | 2
16 | James Wade 97.42 | 8
Chris Dobey 96.22 | 10
8 | Danny Noppert 94.73 | 10
Martin Schindler 88.57 | 8
9 | Nathan Aspinall 98.60 | 10
Krzysztof Ratajski 96.78 | 7
4 | Gerwyn Price 96.88 | 10
Stephen Bunting 92.34 | 3
13 | Joe Cullen 100.67 | 10
Mike De Decker 91.86 | 7
5 | Rob Cross 98.08 | 10
Daryl Gurney 95.33 | 12
12 | Dave Chisnall 91.49 | 6
Gary Anderson 94.07 | 10
2 | Peter Wright 96.41 | 10
Andrew Gilding 87.91 | 4
15 | Ryan Searle 105.19 | 10
Raymond van Barneveld 89.59 | 4
7 | Jonny Clayton 87.91 | 10
Gabriel Clemens 94.51 | 8
10 | Dimitri Van den Bergh 101.24 | 10
Ross Smith 90.71 | 8
3 | Michael van Gerwen 98.98 | 7
Brendan Dolan 95.50 | 10
14 | Damon Heta 94.16 | 10
Josh Rock 95.53 | 5
6 | Luke Humphries 101.78 | 10
José de Sousa 94.30 | 2
11 | Dirk van Duijvenbode 95.52 | 12
Kim Huybrechts 93.08 | 10

Second round (best of 21 legs); 18–19 July
1 | Michael Smith 99.81 | 7
Chris Dobey 98.24 | 11
8 | Danny Noppert 91.68 | 9
9 | Nathan Aspinall 98.07 | 11
4 | Gerwyn Price 100.31 | 11
13 | Joe Cullen 94.33 | 13
Daryl Gurney 104.43 | 11
Gary Anderson 102.47 | 4
2 | Peter Wright 91.90 | 8
15 | Ryan Searle 95.22 | 11
7 | Jonny Clayton 101.90 | 11
10 | Dimitri Van den Bergh 93.49 | 6
Brendan Dolan 89.08 | 1
14 | Damon Heta 95.68 | 11
6 | Luke Humphries 95.17 | 14
11 | Dirk van Duijvenbode 93.04 | 12

Quarter-finals (best of 31 legs); 20–21 July
Chris Dobey 96.79 | 12
9 | Nathan Aspinall 99.33 | 16
13 | Joe Cullen 97.11 | 16
Daryl Gurney 92.18 | 11
15 | Ryan Searle 94.72 | 12
7 | Jonny Clayton 97.55 | 16
14 | Damon Heta 93.22 | 13
6 | Luke Humphries 95.50 | 16

Semi-finals (best of 33 legs); 22 July
9 | Nathan Aspinall 95.26 | 17
13 | Joe Cullen 91.22 | 9
7 | Jonny Clayton 98.92 | 17
6 | Luke Humphries 95.86 | 15

Final (best of 35 legs); 23 July
9 | Nathan Aspinall 96.21 | 18
7 | Jonny Clayton 93.56 | 6

== Top averages ==
The table lists all players who achieved an average of at least 100 in a match. In the case one player has multiple records, this is indicated by the number in brackets.

| # | Player | Round | Average | Result |
|---|---|---|---|---|
| 1 | Ryan Searle | 1st Round | 105.19 | Won |
| 2 | Daryl Gurney | 2nd Round | 104.43 | Won |
| 3 | Gary Anderson | 2nd Round | 102.47 | Lost |
| 4 | Jonny Clayton | 2nd Round | 101.90 | Won |
| 5 | Luke Humphries | 1st Round | 101.50 | Won |
| 6 | Dimitri Van den Bergh | 1st Round | 101.24 | Won |
| 7 | Joe Cullen | 1st Round | 100.67 | Won |
| 8 | Gerwyn Price | 2nd Round | 100.31 | Lost |
