= 2025 in darts =

This topic lists the darts events for the 2025 year.

== Major events ==
- December 15, 2024 – January 3: 2025 PDC World Darts Championship in (England) London
  - Winner: (England) Luke Littler
- January 30 - February 2: 2025 PDC World Masters in (England) Milton Keynes
  - Winner: (England) Luke Humphries
- February 6 – May 29: 2025 Premier League Darts
  - Winner: (England) Luke Humphries
- February 28 -March 2: 2025 UK Open in (England) Minehead
  - Winner: (England) Luke Littler
- June 12-15: 2025 PDC World Cup of Darts in (Germany) Frankfurt
  - Winner: Northern Ireland
- July 19-27: 2025 World Matchplay in (England) Blackpool
  - Winner: (England) Luke Littler
- September 12-14: 2025 World Series of Darts Finals in (Netherlands) Amsterdam
  - Winner: (Netherlands) Michael van Gerwen
- October 6–12: 2025 World Grand Prix in Leicester
  - Winner: (England) Luke Littler
- October 23-26: 2025 European Championship in (Germany) Dortmund
  - Winner: (Netherlands) Gian van Veen
- November 8-16: 2025 Grand Slam of Darts in (England) Wolverhampton
  - Winner: (England) Luke Littler
- November 21-23: 2025 Players Championship Finals in (England) Minehead
  - Winner: (England) Luke Littler

== World Series of Darts ==
- January 16-17: 2025 Bahrain Darts Masters in Sakhir
  - Winner: (England) Stephen Bunting
- January 24-25: 2025 Dutch Darts Masters in (Netherlands) 's-Hertogenbosch
  - Winner: (England) Rob Cross
- June 6-7: 2025 Nordic Darts Masters in (Denmark) Copenhagen
  - Winner: (England) Stephen Bunting
- June 27-28: 2025 US Darts Masters in (United States) New York City
  - Winner: (England) Luke Humphries
- July 4-5: 2025 Poland Darts Masters in Gliwice
  - Winner: (Wales) Gerwyn Price
- August 8-9: 2025 Australian Darts Masters in (Australia) Wollongong
  - Winner: (England) Luke Littler
- August 15-16: 2025 New Zealand Darts Masters in Hamilton
  - Winner: (England) Luke Littler
- September 12-14: 2025 World Series of Darts Finals in (Netherlands) Amsterdam
  - Winner: (Netherlands) Michael van Gerwen

== 2025 Premier League Darts ==
- February 6: Premier League Match Night 1 in SSE Arena, (Northern Ireland) Belfast
  - Winner: (England) Luke Humphries
- February 13: Premier League Match Night 2 in OVO Hydro, (Scotland) Glasgow
  - Winner: (England) Luke Littler
- February 20: Premier League Match Night 3 in 3Arena, (Republic of Ireland) Dublin
  - Winner: (Wales) Gerwyn Price
- February 27: Premier League Match Night 4 in Westport Arena, (England) Exeter
  - Winner: (England) Luke Humphries
- March 6: Premier League Match Night 5 in Brighton Centre (England) Brighton
  - Winner: (England) Luke Littler
- March 13: Premier League Match Night 6 in Motorpoint Arena Nottingham (England) Nottingham
  - Winner: (Wales) Gerwyn Price
- March 20: Premier League Match Night 7 in Cardiff International Arena (Wales) Cardiff
  - Winner: (England) Luke Littler
- March 27: Premier League Match Night 8 in Newcastle Arena (England) Newcastle
  - Winner: (England) Luke Littler
- April 3: Premier League Match Night 9 in Uber Arena (Germany) Berlin
  - Winner: (England) Stephen Bunting
- April 10: Premier League Match Night 10 in AO Arena (England) Manchester
  - Winner: (England) Nathan Aspinall
- April 17: Premier League Match Night 11 in Rotterdam Ahoy (Netherlands) Rotterdam
  - Winner: (England) Chris Dobey
- April 24: Premier League Match Night 12 in Liverpool Arena (England) Liverpool
  - Winner: (Wales) Gerwyn Price
- May 1: Premier League Match Night 13 in Utilita Arena Birmingham (England) Birmingham
  - Winner: (England) Luke Littler
- May 8: Premier League Match Night 14 in First Direct Arena (England) Leeds
  - Winner: (England) Luke Humphries
- May 15: Premier League Match Night 15 in P&J Live (Scotland) Aberdeen
  - Winner: (England) Nathan Aspinall
- May 22: Premier League Match Night 16 in Utilita Arena Sheffield (England) Sheffield
  - Winner: (England) Luke Littler
- May 29: Premier League Play-Offs in The O2 Arena, (England) London
  - Winner: (England) Luke Humphries

== World Darts Federation ==
Major events

- February 3–4: Dutch Open in (Netherlands) Assen
  - Winners: (Netherlands) Jeffrey Sparidaans
- November 29 – December 8: 2025 WDF World Darts Championship in (England) Frimley Green
