= 2025 US Darts Masters =

2025 bet365 US Darts Masters

Tournament information
- Dates: 27–28 June 2025
- Venue: The Theater at Madison Square Garden
- Location: New York City, United States
- Organisation(s): Professional Darts Corporation (PDC)
- Format: Legs
- Prize fund: £100,000
- Winner's share: £30,000
- High checkout: 170; Stephen Bunting; Damon Heta

Champion(s)
- Luke Humphries (ENG)

The 2025 US Darts Masters, known as the 2025 bet365 US Darts Masters for sponsorship reasons, was the seventh staging of the professional darts tournament by the Professional Darts Corporation and the fourth event in the 2025 World Series of Darts. The tournament featured 16 players (eight elite PDC players and eight North American representatives) and was held at the Theater at Madison Square Garden in New York City, United States from 27 to 28 June 2025. The total prize fund was £100,000, with the winner receiving £30,000. The North American Championship also took place on the afternoon of 28 June, exclusively for the North American representatives.

Rob Cross was the defending champion after defeating Gerwyn Price 8–7 in the 2024 final. However, he lost 6–0 to Danny Lauby in the first round.

Luke Humphries won the tournament, his second World Series title, by defeating Nathan Aspinall 8–6 in the final.

== Overview ==
=== Format ===
Eight elite PDC representatives were drawn to play eight North American representatives in the first round on Friday 27 June; the quarter-finals, semi-finals and final all took place on Saturday 28 June. All matches were in leg play format, with the number of legs required to win increasing as the tournament progressed:

- First round and quarter-finals: Best of eleven legs
- Semi-finals: Best of thirteen legs
- Final: Best of fifteen legs

=== Prize money ===
The winner received £30,000. The total prize fund was £100,000.

Position (no. of players)		Prize money (Total: £100,000)
Winner	(1)	£30,000
Runner-up	(1)	£16,000
Semi-finalists	(2)	£10,000
Quarter-finalists	(4)	£5,000
First round	(8)	£1,750

=== Broadcasts ===
In the United States, the tournament was broadcast on streaming service Peacock, as part of a deal between the PDC and NBC Sports that was announced on 29 May 2025, as well as FanDuel and MSG Networks. Other broadcasters included ITV4 (delayed coverage) and ITVX in the United Kingdom; DAZN in Germany, Austria and Switzerland; Viaplay in the Netherlands, Iceland, the Baltic states and Scandinavia; TV Nova in the Czech Republic and Slovakia; Fox Sports in Australia; Sky Sport in New Zealand; Pragosport in Hungary and VTM in Belgium. It was also available on PDCTV to international subscribers.

== Qualifiers ==
The PDC announced the eight players participating as their elite representatives on 15 April. Stephen Bunting and Damon Heta made their debuts at the event, with Heta making his first appearance on the 2025 World Series of Darts.

The seedings were based on the 2025 World Series rankings after three events:

1. Stephen Bunting (first round)
2. Rob Cross (first round)
3. Gerwyn Price (semi-finals)
4. Luke Littler (quarter-finals)
5. Luke Humphries (champion)
6. Nathan Aspinall (runner-up)
7. Michael van Gerwen (quarter-finals)
8. Damon Heta (semi-finals)

Matt Campbell, Jim Long, Danny Lauby and Jules van Dongen represented North America as PDC Tour Card holders. The remaining places were awarded to the Championship Darts Corporation (CDC)'s 2025 Cross-Border Challenge winner Leonard Gates and three CDC qualifiers: Adam Sevada, Jason Brandon and Stowe Buntz.

Qualification	Player
PDC Tour Card holders	Matt Campbell (first round)
PDC Tour Card holders	Jim Long (first round)
PDC Tour Card holders	Danny Lauby (quarter-finals)
PDC Tour Card holders	Jules van Dongen (first round)
CDC Cross-Border Challenge	Leonard Gates (first round)
CDC qualifiers	Adam Sevada (first round)
CDC qualifiers	Jason Brandon (quarter-finals)
CDC qualifiers	Stowe Buntz (first round)

== Summary ==
=== First round ===
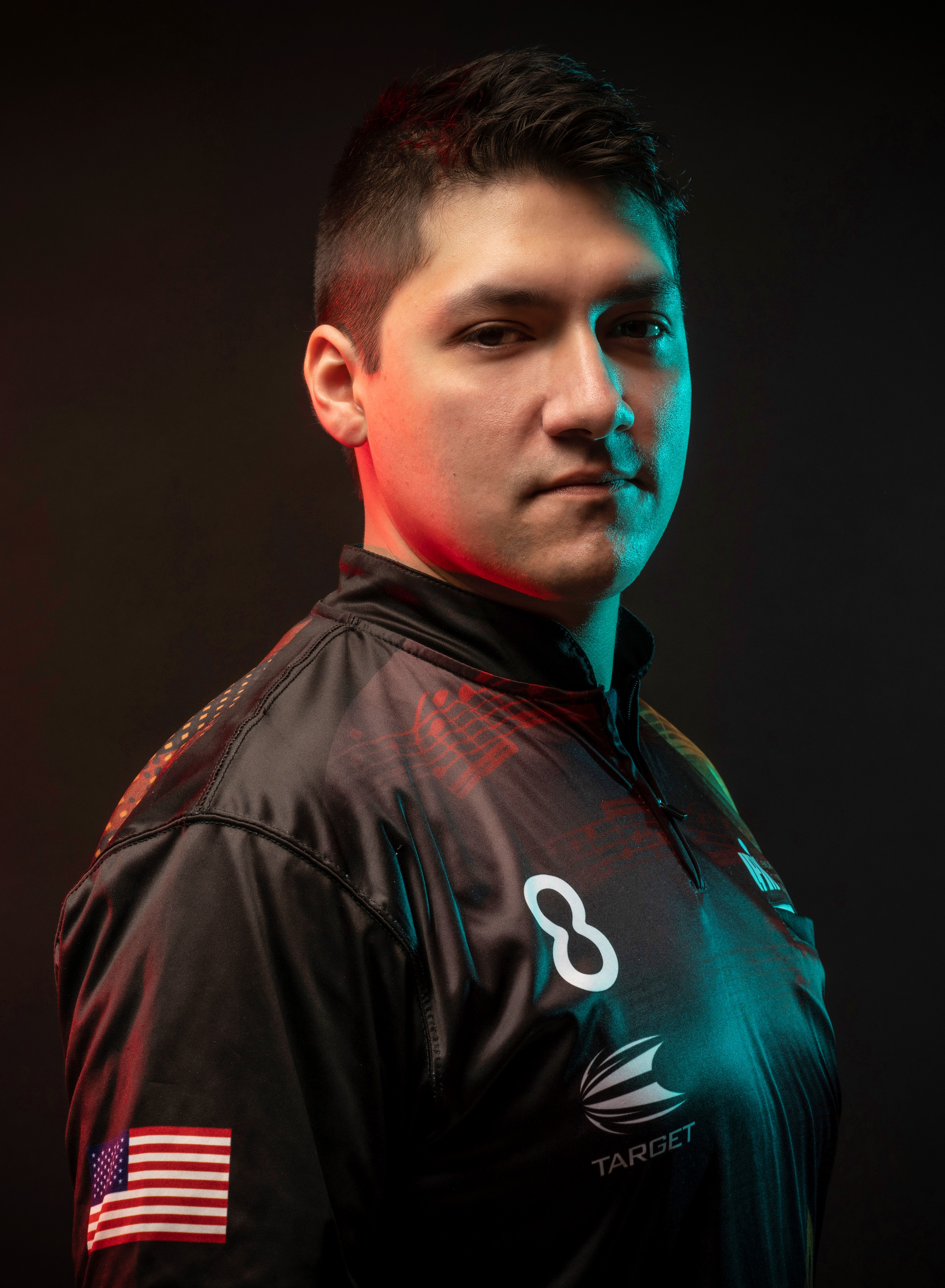
Danny Lauby defeated defending champion Rob Cross 6–0 in the first round.

Six of the eight elite PDC representatives were victorious in the first round. Reigning world champion Luke Littler defeated Jules van Dongen 6–1, winning the final leg with a 120 checkout that saw him hit three double 20s. World number one Luke Humphries went 4–3 down against Stowe Buntz but turned the match around to win 6–4. Nathan Aspinall and Gerwyn Price both averaged over 100 in their victories over Matt Campbell and Adam Sevada respectively, while Damon Heta beat Jim Long 6–1 in his US Darts Masters debut. Michael van Gerwen, returning to darts after separating from his wife, joined the other five PDC representatives in the second round by defeating Leonard Gates 6–1.

The first round saw two upset victories from the North American representatives, as Danny Lauby earned a whitewash victory over defending champion Rob Cross, and Jason Brandon eliminated number one seed Stephen Bunting through a 6–4 win. Lauby won at the event for the first time in four attempts, while Brandon secured his first win in his second appearance. Bunting produced a 170 checkout in defeat. Lauby commented on his win, saying he was "fortunate enough to take advantage" of a poor performance from Cross. Brandon called his triumph against Bunting his "biggest win."

=== Quarter-finals, semi-finals and final ===
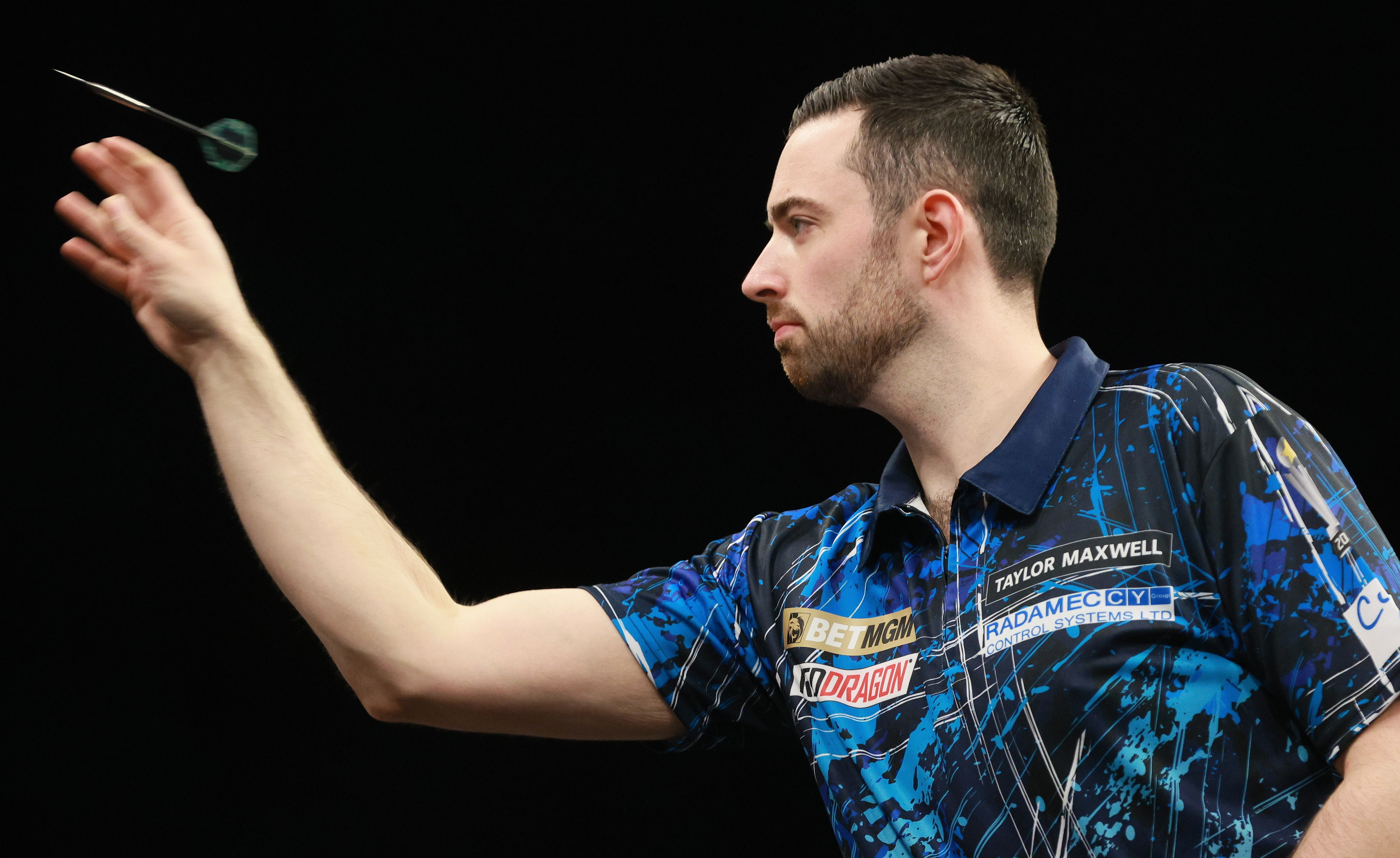
Luke Humphries won his second World Series of Darts title.

Both remaining North American representatives were unable to reach the semi-finals, as Jason Brandon lost 6–0 to Damon Heta and Danny Lauby was defeated by Luke Humphries. Luke Littler was eliminated by Nathan Aspinall in a high-quality contest, with Littler averaging nearly 109 in a 6–4 defeat. Gerwyn Price beat Michael van Gerwen 6–3 to conclude the quarter-finals. In the semi-finals, Heta hit a 170 checkout in his match against Nathan Aspinall, but Aspinall advanced to the final with a 7–3 victory. Luke Humphries won seven consecutive legs to defeat Gerwyn Price 7–2, setting up a final between Aspinall and Humphries. 2019 champion Aspinall aimed to win a second US Darts Masters, while Humphries was looking to claim a second World Series title after winning the 2024 New Zealand Darts Masters.

In the final, Humphries started the match by going 3–0 up in a race to eight legs, punishing a slow start from Aspinall. However, Aspinall brought the match back to 5–5 through a 90 checkout on the bullseye. Humphries responded with a 142 checkout to make it 6–5. With the score at 7–6, Aspinall missed two darts to take the match to a deciding leg, and Humphries hit double eight to win the final. This marked Humphries' second World Series victory and his third televised title win of 2025, following his wins at the World Masters and the Premier League. Speaking after the final, Humphries described Madison Square Garden as the "most iconic venue that [the PDC players] play in" and labelled the win an "amazing relief." Aspinall said that the event was one of the best tournaments he's played in a long time, and commended Humphries for his performance: "that's why he's world number one and the best player in the world." Both players thanked the crowd for their support over the course of the tournament.

== Draw ==
The draw was announced on 26 June. Numbers to the left of players' names show the seedings for the top four in the tournament. The figures to the right of a player's name state their three-dart average in a match. Players in bold denote match winners.

**First round** (best of 11 legs); 27 June
1	Stephen Bunting 91.85	4
**Jason Brandon 86.40**	**6**
**Damon Heta 98.68**	**6**
Jim Long 86.25	1
**4**	**Luke Littler 92.16**	**6**
Jules van Dongen 73.75	1
**Nathan Aspinall 104.68**	**6**
Matt Campbell 84.38	2
2	Rob Cross 89.26	0
**Danny Lauby 93.94**	**6**
**Luke Humphries 93.92**	**6**
Stowe Buntz 86.08	4
**3**	**Gerwyn Price 102.47**	**6**
Adam Sevada 74.65	2
**Michael van Gerwen 99.63**	**6**
Leonard Gates 90.33	1

**Quarter-finals** (best of 11 legs); 28 June
Jason Brandon 85.00	0
**Damon Heta 93.94**	**6**
4	Luke Littler 108.89	4
**Nathan Aspinall 105.88**	**6**
Danny Lauby 77.30	2
**Luke Humphries 90.26**	**6**
**3**	**Gerwyn Price 98.24**	**6**
Michael van Gerwen 93.94	3

**Semi-finals** (best of 13 legs); 28 June
Damon Heta 104.34	3
**Nathan Aspinall 102.00**	**7**
**Luke Humphries 96.82**	**7**
3	Gerwyn Price 90.13	2

**Final** (best of 15 legs); 28 June
Nathan Aspinall 92.49	6
**Luke Humphries 99.14**	**8**
