= PDC Triple Crown =

Three of darts' most prestigious tournaments

The Triple Crown refers to winning three of the most prestigious tournaments in the Professional Darts Corporation (PDC): the World Championship, the World Matchplay, and the Premier League. Since the PDC's inception in 1994, five professional players have won a career Triple Crown: Phil Taylor, Michael van Gerwen, Gary Anderson, Luke Humphries and Luke Littler. Although the Triple Crown is often discussed by players, fans and the media, the Triple Crown is not officially designated by the PDC and its status is controversial.

Taylor has won the most Triple Crown events, with 36, with his nearest competitor being van Gerwen with 13. Littler has six, while Anderson has won five and Humphries three, with Littler the most recent Triple Crown winner. Of the five, only Taylor and Littler have won all three Triple Crown events in a single year, with Taylor accomplishing the feat twice, in 2006 and 2010. Four further players are required to win only one of the three tournaments to be a Triple Crown champion; James Wade, Peter Wright, Rob Cross, and Raymond van Barneveld.

== History ==
In 2005, the inaugural Premier League was held. The event was won by Phil Taylor, who became the first player to win a career Triple Crown in the process, having already won the World Championship and the World Matchplay. In 2006, Taylor won the World Championship, the World Matchplay and the Premier League, becoming the first player to win all three tournaments in the same year, and repeated the feat in 2010. By 2015, broadcaster Sky Sports referred to the three tournaments as the Triple Crown, with Michael van Gerwen being next to achieve the career Triple Crown at the 2015 World Matchplay. In 2018, Anderson became the third player to complete the Triple Crown, winning the World Matchplay seven years after his first Triple Crown title. In 2025, Luke Humphries and Luke Littler became the fourth and fifth players to complete the Triple Crown respectively. Both players took less than two years to complete the achievement, with Humphries doing so by winning the 2025 Premier League while Littler completed the set at the 2025 World Matchplay.

The Triple Crown has been regarded by some as a prestigious achievement and goal of players owing to its rarity, with Luke Humphries describing the achievement as "really, really special" upon becoming the fourth player to win the Triple Crown. Luke Littler, the most recent Triple Crown winner, described the Triple Crown as an achievement he was "focused on" prior to completing it at the 2025 World Matchplay, though he also said that he hadn't previously "realised the Triple Crown was a thing". However, the status of the Triple Crown has been controversial, with critics such as former Players Champion and pundit Paul Nicholson pointing out its lack of official designation by the PDC. Other critics have suggested that the inclusion of the Premier League undermines the achievement as it is an invitational tournament. In 2025, PDC chief executive Matt Porter acknowledged that the concept of the Triple Crown and the debate around it was interesting for fans. However, he also described the Triple Crown as "invented by a small number of people" and ruled out the Triple Crown being officially designated as such in the future, believing that any such designation would undermine the other PDC Premier Events.

== Career Triple Crown winners ==
Five players have completed a career Triple Crown: Phil Taylor, Michael van Gerwen, Gary Anderson, Luke Humphries, and Luke Littler. Only Taylor and Littler have won all three Triple Crown events in the same year, with Taylor achieving the feat twice, in 2006 and 2010. After winning the World Championship in 2017, van Gerwen held all 3 Triple Crown titles simultaneously (having won both the Premier League and the World Matchplay in 2016).

Player	Total	World Championship	World Matchplay	Premier League	Winning span	Career Triple Crown first achieved	Single year Triple Crown	Ref.
Phil Taylor	36	14	16	6	1995–2017	2005 Premier League	2 (2006, 2010)	
**Michael van Gerwen**	13	3	3	7	2013–2023	2015 World Matchplay		
**Luke Littler**	6	2	2	2	2024–2026	2025 World Matchplay	1 (2026)	
**Gary Anderson**	5	2	1	2	2011–2018	2018 World Matchplay		
**Luke Humphries**	3	1	1	1	2024–2025	2025 Premier League		

Legend
The names of active players are marked in **bold**.

== Multiple Triple Crown event winners ==
Twelve players have won multiple Triple Crown events: Phil Taylor, Rod Harrington, John Part, James Wade, Adrian Lewis, Michael van Gerwen, Raymond van Barneveld, Gary Anderson, Rob Cross, Peter Wright, Luke Humphries and Luke Littler. Phil Taylor holds the record for most Triple Crown titles, having won 36 titles between 1995 and 2017.

Player	Total	World Championship	World Matchplay	Premier League	Winning span
Phil Taylor	36	14	16	6	1995–2017
**Michael van Gerwen**	13	3	3	7	2013–2023
**Luke Littler**	6	2	2	2	2024–2026
**Gary Anderson**	5	2	1	2	2011–2018
**Peter Wright**	3	2	1	0	2020–2022
**Luke Humphries**	3	1	1	1	2024–2025
John Part	2	2	0	0	2003–2008
Adrian Lewis	2	2	0	0	2011–2012
**Rob Cross**	2	1	1	0	2018–2019
**Raymond van Barneveld**	2	1	0	1	2007–2014
Rod Harrington	2	0	2	0	1998–1999
**James Wade**	2	0	1	1	2007–2009

Legend
	Player has won all three Triple Crown tournaments.
	Player has won two of the three Triple Crown tournaments.
**Bold**	Player is a current PDC Tour Card holder.

=== One win away from Triple Crown ===
James Wade has won the Premier League and the World Matchplay once each, meaning he needs to win the World Championship to complete the Triple Crown. Peter Wright is yet to win the Premier League, but does have two World Championship titles and a World Matchplay title to his name. With three Triple Crown competition wins, he has the highest number of Triple Crown titles of any player who has not completed the set. Rob Cross also needs to win the Premier League to complete the Triple Crown having won the World Championship in 2018 and the World Matchplay in 2019. Raymond van Barneveld has won the Premier League and World Championship once each, and needs to win a World Matchplay to complete the set.

Wright, van Barneveld and Cross have all reached the final of their respective missing Triple Crown tournaments, whereas Wade is a four-time World Championship semi-finalist.
