= 2024 World Matchplay =

2024 Betfred World Matchplay

Tournament information
- Dates: 13–21 July 2024
- Venue: Winter Gardens
- Location: Blackpool, England
- Organisation(s): Professional Darts Corporation (PDC)
- Format: Legs
- Prize fund: £800,000
- Winner's share: £200,000
- Nine-dart finish: Dimitri Van den Bergh
- High checkout: 170; Gian van Veen; Chris Dobey

Champion(s)
- Luke Humphries (ENG)

The 2024 World Matchplay (known for sponsorship reasons as the 2024 Betfred World Matchplay) was a professional darts tournament that was held at the Winter Gardens in Blackpool, England, from 13 to 21 July 2024. It was the 31st staging of the World Matchplay by the Professional Darts Corporation (PDC). The total prize fund was £800,000, with the winner receiving £200,000. The third edition of the Women's World Matchplay also took place on 21 July and was won by Beau Greaves.

The tournament, sponsored by Betfred, featured 32 players: the top 16 players on the two-year PDC Order of Merit and the top 16 players from the one-year PDC Pro Tour Order of Merit who had not yet qualified.

Nathan Aspinall was the defending champion, having defeated Jonny Clayton 18–6 in the 2023 final, but he was eliminated in the second round, losing 11–8 to James Wade.

Luke Humphries won his first World Matchplay title, beating Michael van Gerwen 18–15 in the final. He became the fourth player to win the World Championship and the World Matchplay in the same year after Phil Taylor, Michael van Gerwen and Peter Wright and only the second player after Phil Taylor to average more than 100 in all five matches on the way to the title.

Dimitri Van den Bergh hit a nine-darter during his first round win against Martin Schindler.

== Prize money ==
The prize fund remained at £800,000, with £200,000 going to the winner.

Position (no. of players)		Prize money (Total: £800,000)
Winner	(1)	£200,000
Runner-up	(1)	£100,000
Semi-finalists	(2)	£50,000
Quarter-finalists	(4)	£30,000
Last 16 (second round) losers	(8)	£15,000
Last 32 (first round) losers	(16)	£10,000

== Format ==
All games had to be won by two clear legs, with a game being extended if necessary for a maximum of six extra legs before a tie-break leg is required. For example, in a first to 10 legs first round match, if the score reaches 12–12 then the 25th leg is the decider.

The first round was played first to 10 legs, second round first to 11 legs, quarter-finals first to 16 legs, semi-finals first to 17 legs and final first to 18 legs.

== Qualification ==
The top 16 players on the PDC Order of Merit at the cut-off point on 7 July were seeded for the tournament. The top 16 players on the ProTour Order of Merit, not to have already qualified on the cut-off date were unseeded.

Gian van Veen, Luke Littler, Ricardo Pietreczko, Ritchie Edhouse and Luke Woodhouse made their World Matchplay debuts.

The following players qualified for the tournament:

=== PDC Order of Merit ===
1. Luke Humphries (champion)
2. Michael van Gerwen (runner-up)
3. Michael Smith (semi-finals)
4. Gerwyn Price (second round)
5. Nathan Aspinall (second round)
6. Rob Cross (quarter-finals)
7. Dave Chisnall (first round)
8. Jonny Clayton (second round)
9. Dimitri Van den Bergh (quarter-finals)
10. Peter Wright (first round)
11. Damon Heta (first round)
12. Danny Noppert (first round)
13. Ross Smith (quarter-finals)
14. Chris Dobey (second round)
15. Joe Cullen (second round)
16. Stephen Bunting (second round)

=== PDC Pro Tour Qualifiers ===
1. Gary Anderson (first round)
2. Josh Rock (first round)
3. Ryan Searle (second round)
4. Martin Schindler (first round)
5. Gian van Veen (first round)
6. Luke Littler (first round)
7. Ricardo Pietreczko (first round)
8. Daryl Gurney (first round)
9. Ryan Joyce (first round)
10. Raymond van Barneveld (first round)
11. Brendan Dolan (first round)
12. Ritchie Edhouse (first round)
13. Krzysztof Ratajski (second round)
14. Luke Woodhouse (first round)
15. Andrew Gilding (quarter-finals)
16. James Wade (semi-finals)

== Schedule ==
Saturday, 13 July

Match #	Round	Player 1	Score	Player 2	Break 1	Break 2
01	1	Gerwyn Price 99.43	10 – 4	Daryl Gurney 94.88	4 – 1	6 – 4
02	1	Jonny Clayton 100.77	10 – 7	Raymond van Barneveld 96.17	3 – 2	7 – 3
03	1	Luke Humphries 108.76	10 – 4	Ricardo Pietreczko 100.74	4 – 1	7 – 3
04	1	Nathan Aspinall 92.24	10 – 8	Luke Woodhouse 92.28	2 – 3	6 – 4

Sunday, 14 July

Match #	Round	Player 1	Score	Player 2	Break 1	Break 2
05	1	Ross Smith 99.15	10 – 4	Josh Rock 98.91	3 – 2	7 – 3
06	1	Danny Noppert 91.96	5 – 10	James Wade 95.91	1 – 4	3 – 7
07	1	Dimitri Van den Bergh 98.91	10 – 6	Martin Schindler 94.81	3 – 2	6 – 4
08	1	Stephen Bunting 97.42	12 – 10	Ryan Joyce 95.57	3 – 2	6 – 4
09	1	Rob Cross 100.42	13 – 12	Gian van Veen 100.81	2 – 3	6 – 4
10	1	Joe Cullen 100.19	10 – 4	Brendan Dolan 89.99	3 – 2	6 – 4
11	1	Peter Wright 95.26	5 – 10	Andrew Gilding 94.35	1 – 4	4 – 6
12	1	Dave Chisnall 85.76	2 – 10	Krzysztof Ratajski 95.11	0 – 5	2 – 8

Monday, 15 July

Match #	Round	Player 1	Score	Player 2	Break 1	Break 2
13	1	Damon Heta 100.93	4 – 10	Ryan Searle 101.01	2 – 3	3 – 7
14	1	Michael Smith 102.08	10 – 5	Gary Anderson 98.97	2 – 3	7 – 3
15	1	Michael van Gerwen 101.93	10 – 6	Luke Littler 100.83	3 – 2	6 – 4
16	1	Chris Dobey 93.94	10 – 7	Ritchie Edhouse 87.63	3 – 2	5 – 5

Tuesday, 16 July

Match #	Round	Player 1	Score	Player 2	Break 1	Break 2
17	2	Gerwyn Price 93.57	9 – 11	Ross Smith 98.70	2 – 3	5 – 5
18	2	Nathan Aspinall 87.14	8 – 11	James Wade 93.41	1 – 4	5 – 5
19	2	Luke Humphries 102.34	11 – 7	Stephen Bunting 94.51	3 – 2	5 – 5
20	2	Jonny Clayton 96.72	5 – 11	Dimitri Van den Bergh 96.85	2 – 3	4 – 6

Wednesday, 17 July

Match #	Round	Player 1	Score	Player 2	Break 1	Break 2
21	2	Krzysztof Ratajski 95.19	5 – 11	Andrew Gilding 98.30	2 – 3	3 – 7
22	2	Rob Cross 106.99	11 – 6	Ryan Searle 96.72	2 – 3	6 – 4
23	2	Michael van Gerwen 95.49	11 – 8	Joe Cullen 91.88	4 – 1	6 – 4
24	2	Michael Smith 93.91	11 – 9	Chris Dobey 94.80	4 – 1	6 – 4

Thursday, 18 July

Match #	Round	Player 1	Score	Player 2	Break 1	Break 2	Break 3	Break 4
25	QF	Ross Smith 99.87	10 – 16	James Wade 100.30	3 – 2	4 – 6	6 – 9	8 – 12
26	QF	Luke Humphries 101.21	16 – 10	Dimitri Van den Bergh 95.64	3 – 2	5 – 5	8 – 7	11 – 9

Friday, 19 July

Match #	Round	Player 1	Score	Player 2	Break 1	Break 2	Break 3	Break 4
27	QF	Michael van Gerwen 96.99	16 – 10	Andrew Gilding 89.98	3 – 2	4 – 6	7 – 8	12 – 8
28	QF	Michael Smith 96.35	16 – 7	Rob Cross 94.19	4 – 1	8 – 2	11 – 4	14 – 6

Saturday, 20 July

Match #	Round	Player 1	Score	Player 2	Break 1	Break 2	Break 3	Break 4
29	SF	Luke Humphries 100.64	17 – 10	James Wade 102.38	3 – 2	5 – 5	8 – 7	12 – 8
30	SF	Michael van Gerwen 98.43	17 – 13	Michael Smith 96.93	4 – 1	5 – 5	9 – 6	11 – 9

Sunday, 21 July

Match #	Round	Player 1	Score	Player 2	Break 1	Break 2	Break 3	Break 4	Break 5
31	F	Luke Humphries 100.94	18 – 15	Michael van Gerwen 98.74	2 – 3	6 – 4	9 – 6	11 – 9	13 – 12

== Draw ==
First round (best of 19 legs); 13–15 July
1	Luke Humphries 108.76	10
Ricardo Pietreczko 100.74	4
16	Stephen Bunting 97.42	12
Ryan Joyce 95.57	10
8	Jonny Clayton 100.77	10
Raymond van Barneveld 96.17	7
9	Dimitri Van den Bergh 98.91	10
Martin Schindler 94.81	6
4	Gerwyn Price 99.43	10
Daryl Gurney 94.88	4
13	Ross Smith 99.15	10
Josh Rock 98.91	4
5	Nathan Aspinall 92.24	10
Luke Woodhouse 92.28	8
12	Danny Noppert 91.96	5
James Wade 95.91	10
2	Michael van Gerwen 101.93	10
Luke Littler 100.83	6
15	Joe Cullen 100.14	10
Brendan Dolan 89.99	4
7	Dave Chisnall 85.76	2
Krzysztof Ratajski 95.11	10
10	Peter Wright 95.26	5
Andrew Gilding 94.35	10
3	Michael Smith 102.08	10
Gary Anderson 98.97	5
14	Chris Dobey 93.94	10
Ritchie Edhouse 87.63	7
6	Rob Cross 100.42	13
Gian van Veen 100.81	12
11	Damon Heta 100.93	4
Ryan Searle 101.01	10

Second round (best of 21 legs); 16–17 July
1	Luke Humphries 102.34	11
16	Stephen Bunting 94.51	7
8	Jonny Clayton 96.72	5
9	Dimitri Van den Bergh 96.85	11
4	Gerwyn Price 93.57	9
13	Ross Smith 98.70	11
5	Nathan Aspinall 87.14	8
James Wade 93.41	11
2	Michael van Gerwen 95.49	11
15	Joe Cullen 91.88	8
Krzysztof Ratajski 95.19	5
Andrew Gilding 98.30	11
3	Michael Smith 93.91	11
14	Chris Dobey 94.80	9
6	Rob Cross 106.99	11
Ryan Searle 96.72	6

Quarter-finals (best of 31 legs); 18–19 July
1	Luke Humphries 101.21	16
9	Dimitri Van den Bergh 95.64	10
13	Ross Smith 99.87	10
James Wade 100.30	16
2	Michael van Gerwen 96.99	16
Andrew Gilding 89.98	10
3	Michael Smith 96.35	16
6	Rob Cross 94.19	7

Semi-finals (best of 33 legs); 20 July
1	Luke Humphries 100.64	17
James Wade 102.38	10
2	Michael van Gerwen 98.43	17
3	Michael Smith 96.93	13

Final (best of 35 legs); 21 July
1	Luke Humphries 100.94	18
2	Michael van Gerwen 98.74	15

== Top averages ==
The table lists all players who achieved an average of at least 100 in a match. In the case one player has multiple records, this is indicated by the number in brackets.

#	Player	Round	Average	Result
1	Luke Humphries	1st Round	108.76	Won
2	Rob Cross	2nd Round	106.99	Won
3	James Wade	Semi-final	102.38	Lost
4	Luke Humphries (2)	2nd Round	102.34	Won
5	Michael Smith	1st Round	102.08	Won
6	Michael van Gerwen	1st Round	101.93	Won
7	Luke Humphries (3)	Quarter-final	101.21	Won
8	Ryan Searle	1st Round	101.01	Won
9	Luke Humphries (4)	Final	100.94	Won
10	Damon Heta	1st Round	100.93	Lost
11	Luke Littler	1st Round	100.83	Lost
12	Gian van Veen	1st Round	100.81	Lost
13	Jonny Clayton	1st Round	100.77	Won
14	Ricardo Pietreczko	1st Round	100.74	Lost
15	Luke Humphries (5)	Semi-final	100.64	Won
16	Rob Cross (2)	1st Round	100.42	Won
17	James Wade (2)	Quarter-final	100.30	Won
18	Joe Cullen	1st Round	100.19	Won
