= Luke Humphries =

English darts player (born 1995)

Luke Humphries MBE
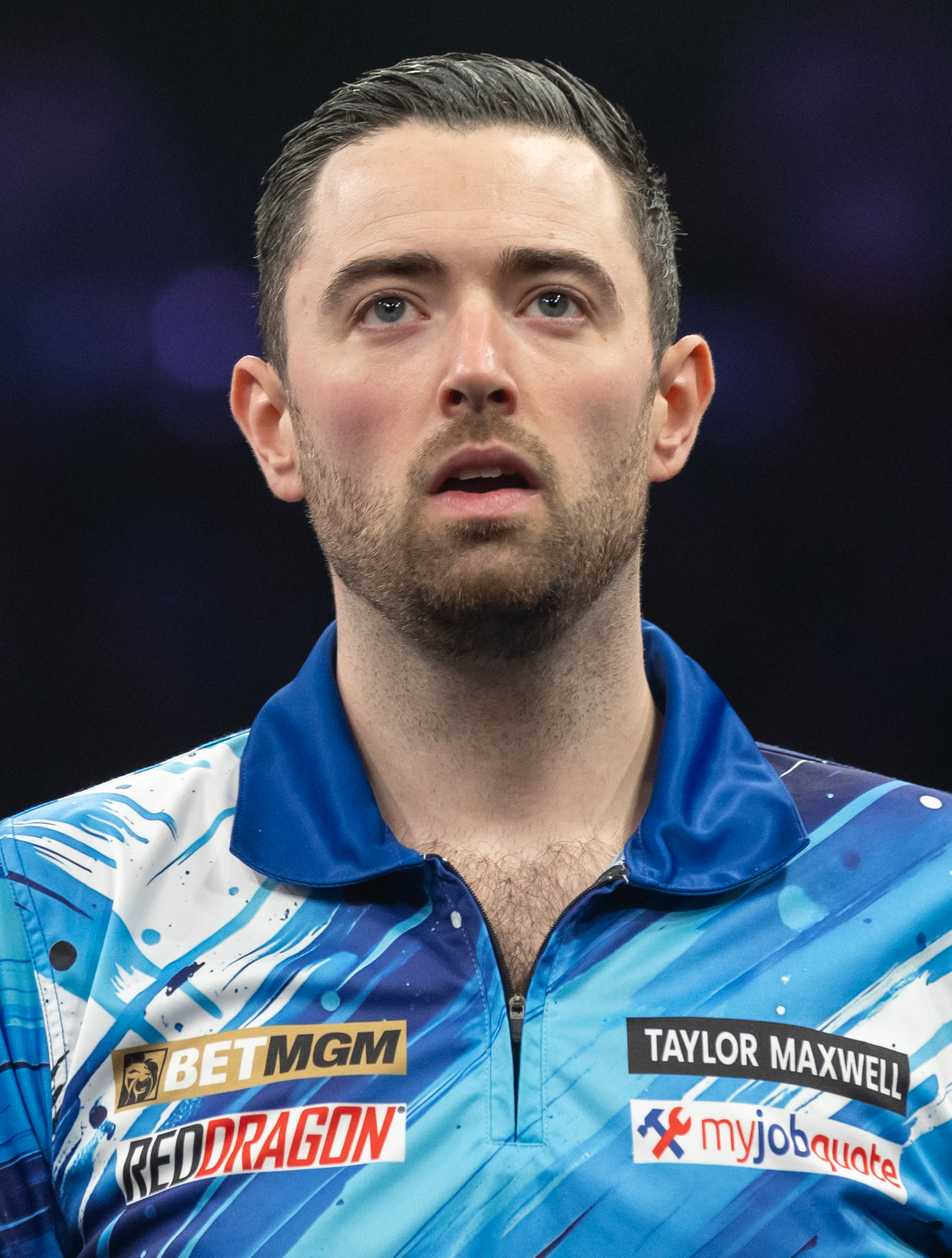
- Humphries in 2026

Personal information
- Nickname: "Cool Hand"
- Born: 11 February 1995 (age 31) Reading, Berkshire, England
- Home town: Newbury, Berkshire, England

Sport
- Sport: Darts
- Playing since: 2010
- Darts: 22g Red Dragon Signature
- Laterality: Right-handed
- Walk-on music: “I Predict a Riot” by Kaiser Chiefs

Organisation (see split in darts)
- PDC: 2011–present (Tour Card: 2018–present)
- Current world ranking: (PDC) 4 ▼2 (22 November 2026)

PDC premier events – best performances
- World Championship: Winner (1): 2024
- World Matchplay: Winner (1): 2024
- World Grand Prix: Winner (2): 2023, 2026
- UK Open: Runner-up: 2021, 2024
- Grand Slam: Winner (1): 2023
- European Championship: Runner-up: 2025
- Premier League: Winner (1): 2025
- PC Finals: Winner (2): 2023, 2024
- Masters: Winner (1): 2025
- World Series Finals: Semi-final: 2023

Other tournament wins
- Years
| PDC World Cup of Darts (team event) | 2024, 2026 |

Other achievements
| 2019 | Best Newcomer |
| 2020 | Young Player of the Year |
| 2022 | Pro Tour Player of the Year |
| 2023 | PDC Player of the Year |
| 2023 | Fans' Player of the Year |
| 2023 | PDPA Players' Player of the Year |

Luke Humphries (born 11 February 1995) is an English professional darts player who competes in Professional Darts Corporation (PDC) events, where he is ranked world number four; he was ranked world number one from 3 January 2024 to 16 November 2025. Nicknamed "Cool Hand", he won the 2024 PDC World Darts Championship. He has won nine PDC major singles titles—ranked fifth all-time—and a total of 31 PDC titles.

After winning the 2019 PDC World Youth Championship and eleven PDC Development Tour titles, Humphries reached his first PDC major final at the 2021 UK Open and won four titles on the 2022 European Tour. He won his first three PDC major titles in 2023, followed by his maiden World Championship victory at the 2024 edition, where he defeated Luke Littler 7–4 in the final. That year, he won a further two PDC major titles, including the World Matchplay. Humphries won two more PDC major titles in 2025, including the Premier League. He has also won the World Cup of Darts twice for England, teaming with Michael Smith in 2024 and Littler in 2026.

Humphries was named PDC Player of the Year in 2023. He was appointed a Member of the Order of the British Empire (MBE) in the 2025 Birthday Honours for services to darts.

== Early life ==
Luke Humphries was born on 11 February 1995 in Reading, Berkshire. He grew up in Newbury. His maternal grandfather was Irish. His father, a fan of football club Leeds United FC, named him Luke as an acronym for "Leeds United, Kings of Europe". His father also played county darts for Berkshire, inspiring a young Humphries to follow in his footsteps.

== Career ==
=== 2017–2018 ===
Humphries won five PDC Development Tour titles in 2017, finishing top of the Development Tour Order of Merit. As a result of this, he qualified for the 2018 PDC World Darts Championship and received a PDC Tour Card for the 2018 and 2019 seasons. He also won a PDC Challenge Tour title in Event 12, defeating Andy Smith 5–4 in the final. At the 2018 World Championship, he lost 2–0 to Jeff Smith in the preliminary round. He added another three titles to his name during the 2018 Development Tour, topping the Order of Merit once again.

=== 2019: World Youth champion ===
At the 2019 World Championship, Humphries had his breakthrough event on television, beating Adam Hunt, Stephen Bunting, Dimitri Van den Bergh, and defending champion Rob Cross, before eventually losing to Michael Smith in the quarter-finals.

Following Gary Anderson's withdrawal from the 2019 Premier League, Humphries was selected as one of nine 'contenders' to replace him. He played a one-off match against Gerwyn Price on night four in Exeter, which ended in a 6–6 draw.

At the age of 24, Humphries won the 2019 PDC World Youth Championship, where he beat Adam Gawlas 6–0 in the final.

=== 2020–2021: First major final ===
At the 2020 World Championship, Humphries once again reached the quarter-finals before losing 5–3 to eventual champion Peter Wright. Humphries was once again selected for the Premier League, this time under the tag of 'challenger'. He faced Gary Anderson in Exeter and became the first challenger to win their game. Humphries was the winner of PDC Home Tour 2 after winning five of his six Championship Group matches, beating Jonny Clayton based on leg difference.

At the 2021 World Championship, Humphries suffered a shock 3–2 first-round defeat to 66-year-old Paul Lim. He made his first major televised final at the 2021 UK Open in March 2021. His run to the final saw him claim wins over Dave Chisnall in the quarter-finals and then-reigning champion Michael van Gerwen in the semi-finals. He was defeated 11–5 by James Wade in the final.

=== 2022: European Tour wins ===
At the 2022 World Championship, Humphries reached his third quarter-final in four years before losing 5–2 to Gary Anderson. He won his maiden PDC ranking title in the opening Players Championship event of the year, defeating Ryan Searle 8–4 in the final.

Humphries reached his first PDC European Tour final at the German Darts Grand Prix by beating Jeffrey de Zwaan, Michael Smith and Wesley Plaisier before a 7–0 whitewash against Michael van Gerwen in the semi-finals. He beat Martin Lukeman 8–2 in the final. He then won back-to-back titles at the Czech Darts Open and the European Darts Grand Prix before adding an 8–7 win against Rowby-John Rodriguez in the final of the 2022 European Darts Matchplay, ending the year with four European Tour titles.

His year culminated with back-to-back major semi-finals at the Grand Slam and Players Championship Finals, being eliminated by Nathan Aspinall and Michael van Gerwen respectively.

=== 2023: First major titles ===
At the 2023 World Championship, Humphries reached the fourth round before losing 4–1 to Stephen Bunting. He won a European Tour title and two Players Championship titles on the 2023 PDC Pro Tour. Humphries retained the European Darts Matchplay, surviving four match darts from Dirk van Duijvenbode to prevail 8–7 in a deciding leg. Over a week later, he defeated Dave Chisnall 8–7 to win Players Championship 15. He then defeated Kevin Doets 8–6 in the final of Players Championship 20. He reached the semi-finals of the World Matchplay, where he was beaten 17–15 by Jonny Clayton.

In October, Humphries won his first major title at the World Grand Prix. He overcame a 2–0 deficit to beat Peter Wright 3–2 in the second round after Wright missed match darts, before defeating tournament favourite Gerwyn Price 5–2 in the final. The £120,000 prize money earned through this victory saw him move into fourth in the PDC Order of Merit. He won his second major televised title 42 days later at the Grand Slam of Darts, defeating Rob Cross 16–8 in the final. Humphries added a third title at the Players Championship Finals. He came back from 9–5 down to defeat Michael van Gerwen 11–9.

=== 2024: World champion ===
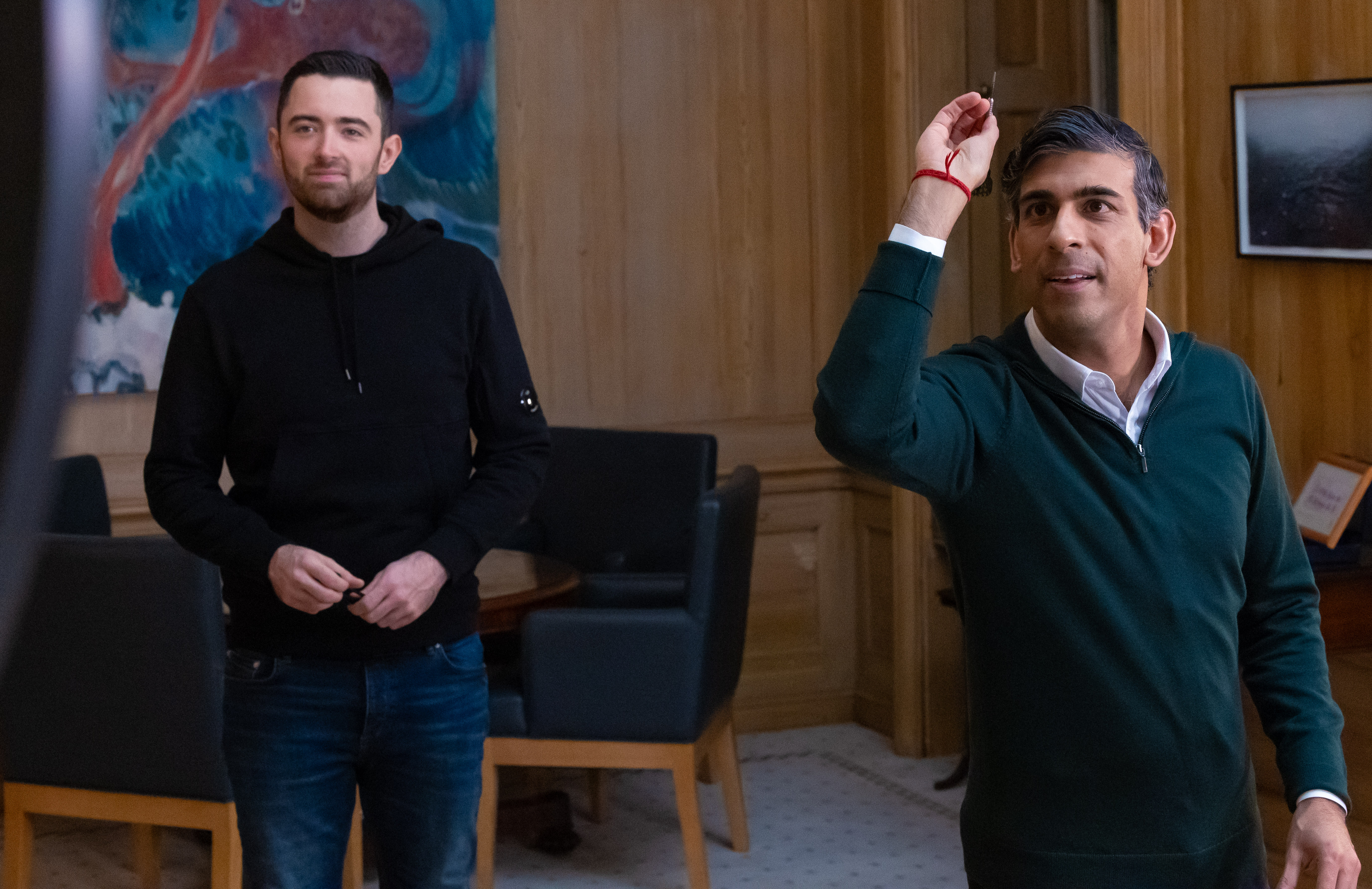
Humphries (left) playing darts with Rishi Sunak, then-UK Prime Minister

Humphries entered the 2024 World Championship with many considering him the favourite to win the tournament. He reached the final by beating Scott Williams 6–0 in the semi-finals, having survived a sudden-death leg against Joe Cullen in the fourth round. On 3 January 2024, Humphries won the World Championship by winning five sets in a row to defeat 16-year-old Luke Littler 7–4 in the final, earning the £500,000 top prize and becoming the new world number one on the PDC Order of Merit. Following his victory, he was invited to meet Prime Minister Rishi Sunak at Downing Street.

In March, Humphries reached the final of the UK Open for the second time. He missed two match darts to win the title in an 11–10 loss to Dimitri Van den Bergh. Competing in a full Premier League Darts season for the first time, Humphries won his first Premier League night on night six. He achieved a streak of three consecutive nightly wins with further victories on nights seven and eight. He secured a fourth nightly win on night 15 in Leeds. After sixteen nights, Humphries finished second in the Premier League table behind Luke Littler. He was matched up against third-placed Michael van Gerwen in the semi-finals of the play-offs. He won the semi-final 10–5 to advance to the final, which he lost 11–7 to Littler.

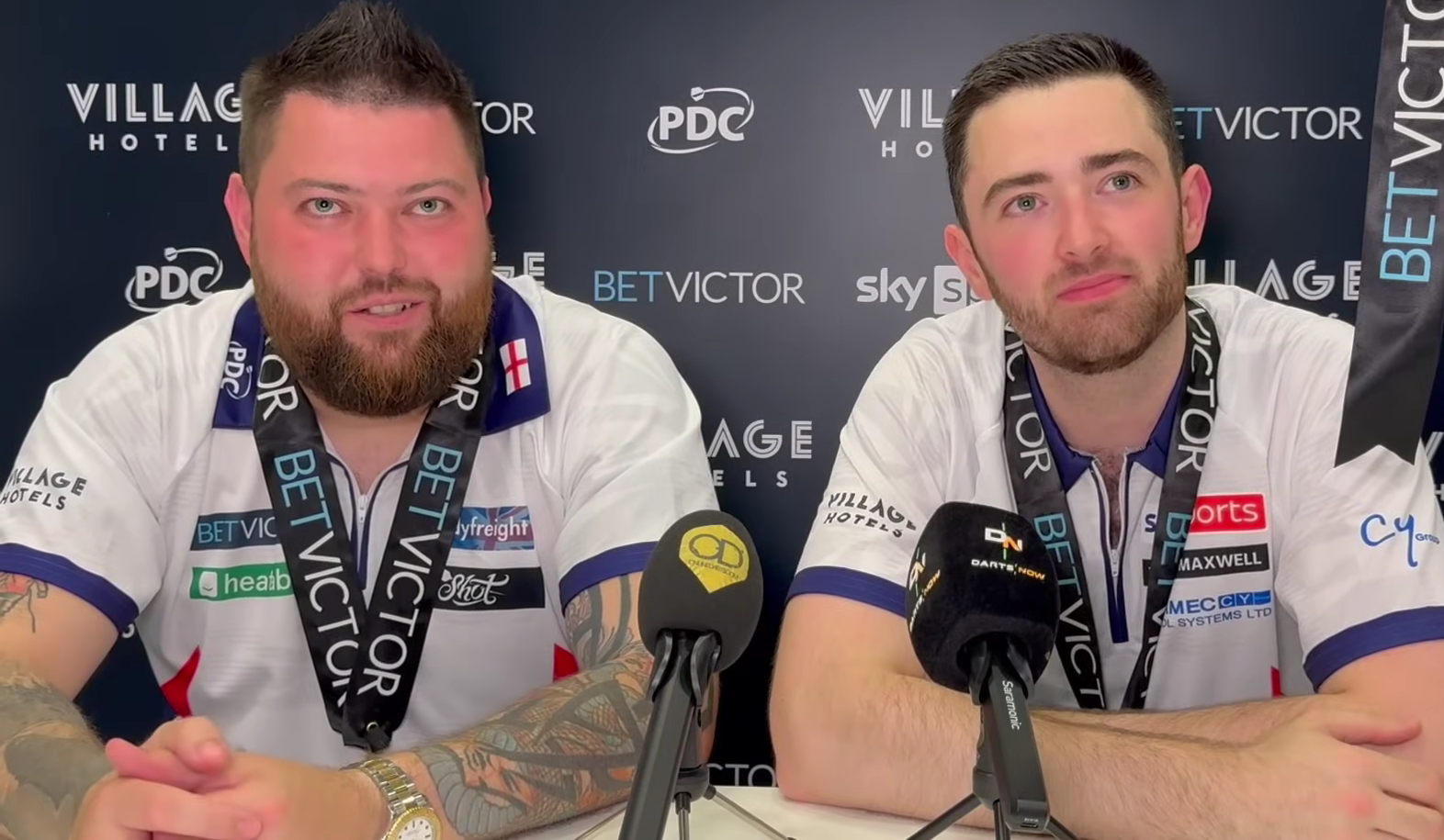
Humphries (right) with Michael Smith after their win in the 2024 PDC World Cup of Darts

Humphries won his first European Tour title of the season at the German Darts Grand Prix, winning 8–1 against Michael van Gerwen in the final. He represented England for the first time in the World Cup of Darts in June, partnering Michael Smith. The pair became the first English team to win the tournament since 2016, defeating Austria 10–6 in the final. In July, he won the World Matchplay, beating Van Gerwen 18–15 in the final. This made him the fourth player after Phil Taylor, Van Gerwen and Peter Wright to win the World Championship and the World Matchplay within the same year. In August, Humphries won his first World Series of Darts title, defeating Damon Heta 8–2 to win the New Zealand Darts Masters.

In October, Humphries started his defence of the World Grand Prix, where he reached the final for a second consecutive year. However, he lost 6–4 to outsider Mike De Decker. Humphries added two more Pro Tour titles during the month, with an 8–7 win over Stephen Bunting in the final at Players Championship 26 and an 8–1 win over Kim Huybrechts in the final of the Czech Darts Open. In November, following elimination in the group stage of the Grand Slam, Humphries retained the Players Championship Finals, defeating Luke Littler 11–7 in the final.

=== 2025: Premier League champion ===
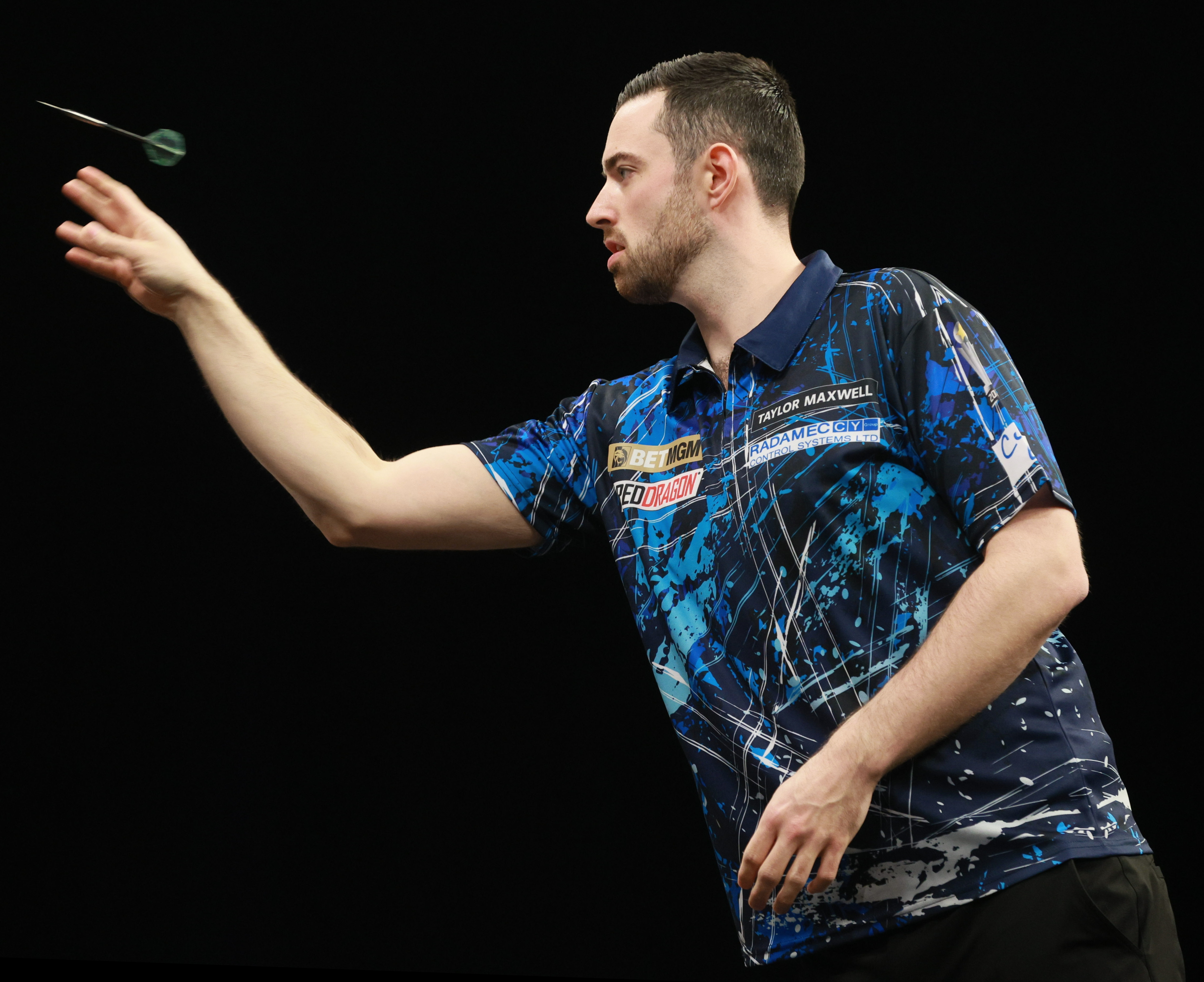
Humphries on night nine of the 2025 Premier League

At the 2025 World Championship, Humphries began his title defence with a 3–0 whitewash win over Thibault Tricole, followed by a 4–0 victory against Nick Kenny, setting up a fourth-round tie against Peter Wright. The pair exchanged words about each other in the lead-up to the match, leading Humphries to accuse Wright of "mind games". In their match, Humphries levelled the contest at 1–1 before dropping the next three sets to lose to Wright 4–1, ending his tenure as world champion.

In February, he won the PDC World Masters, defeating Jonny Clayton 6–5 to win his seventh major title. On night five of the Premier League, he achieved a nine-dart finish in his 6–4 loss to Rob Cross. After a third nightly win in Leeds on night 14, he ended the league stage of the Premier League on 34 points, finishing second in the table and qualifying for the play-offs. On Finals Night on 29 May, he defeated Nathan Aspinall 10–7 in the semi-finals to set up a tie with Luke Littler in the final – a rematch of the previous year's final. Humphries avenged his 2024 loss by beating Littler 11–8 to win his first Premier League title. This made him the fourth player to win the so-called PDC Triple Crown (Premier League, World Championship and World Matchplay) after Gary Anderson, Phil Taylor and Michael van Gerwen.

Humphries won his second World Series title at the US Darts Masters, defeating Nathan Aspinall 8–6 in the final. He won the Czech Darts Open for the third time by beating Josh Rock 8–5. Humphries finished as runner-up at both the World Grand Prix and the European Championship; he was defeated 6–1 by Luke Littler in the World Grand Prix final, and missed a match dart to beat Gian van Veen in the European Championship, losing 11–10. After hitting a nine-darter in his group-stage win against Michael Smith, Humphries reached a third consecutive major final at the Grand Slam, where he was beaten 16–11 by Littler, who replaced Humphries as world number one in the process.

=== 2026 ===
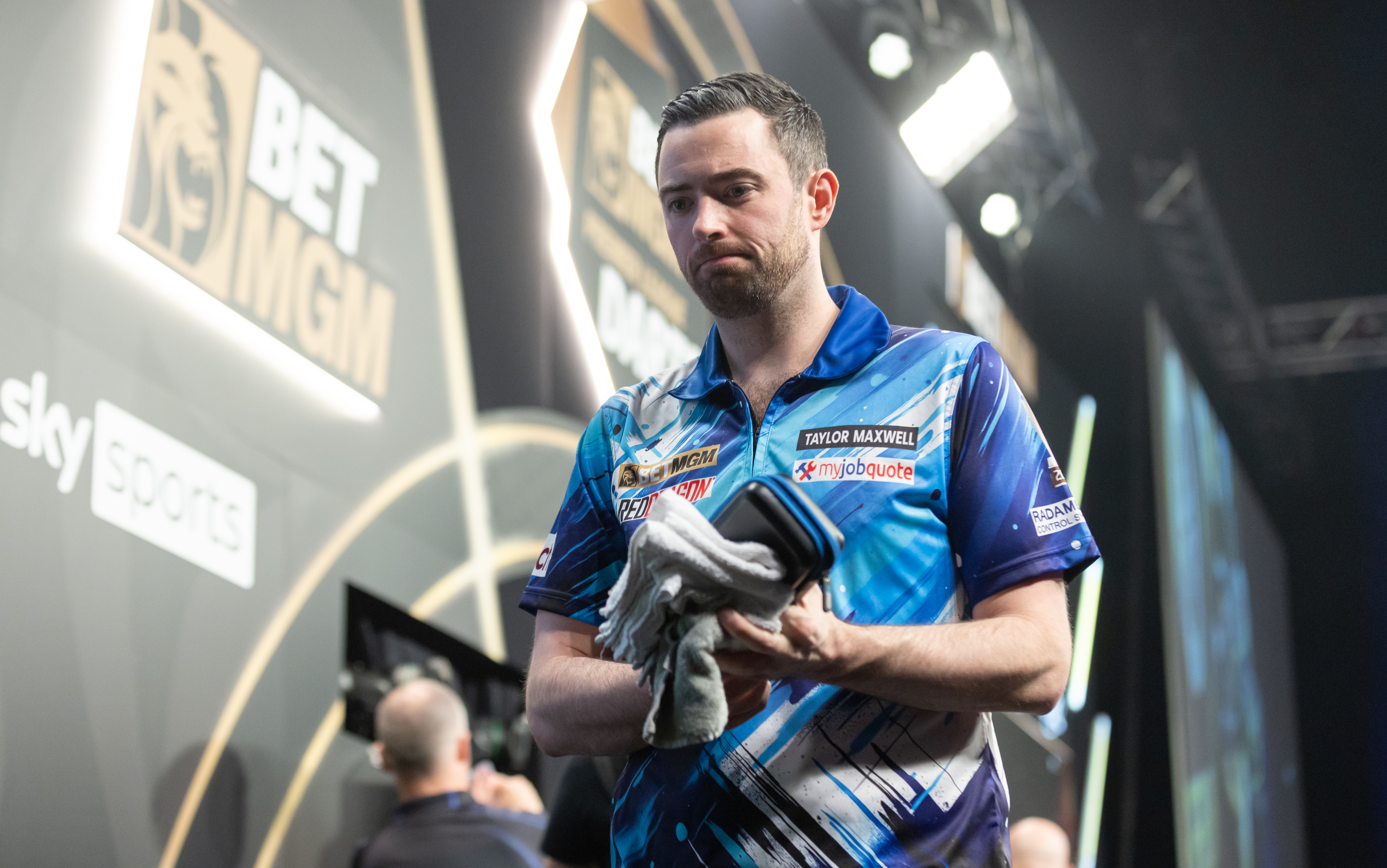
Humphries on night eight of the 2026 Premier League

Humphries defeated Ted Evetts 3–1 in his opening match of the 2026 World Championship. He won 3–0 against Paul Lim in the second round, a rematch of their 2021 World Championship meeting. Following victories over Gabriel Clemens and Kevin Doets, Humphries was eliminated from the tournament in the quarter-finals, losing 5–1 to Gian van Veen. At the World Masters, he hit a nine-dart finish against Luke Woodhouse in the second round. He reached the final of the tournament, where he took a 5–4 lead before losing 6–5 to Luke Littler.

Humphries won his first title of 2026 at Players Championship 4, defeating Wessel Nijman 8–6 in the final. At the Belgian Darts Open, he won his ninth European Tour title with an 8–6 win over Jonny Clayton. He added a third title at Players Championship 17 by beating Jermaine Wattimena 8–4. Humphries achieved his sole Premier League nightly win on night 15 in Birmingham, earning victories over Stephen Bunting, Luke Littler, and Gerwyn Price. This secured his place in the Premier League play-offs; he finished the league stage in third place with 27 points. On Finals Night on 28 May, he defeated Clayton 10–9 after Clayton missed a dart to win the match. He contested a third consecutive Premier League final against Littler, to whom he lost 11–10.

At the World Cup of Darts, Humphries represented England alongside Luke Littler for the second consecutive year, with the pair defeating the Netherlands 10–5 in the final to win Humphries's second World Cup title and England's record-extending sixth title overall. He beat Brendan Dolan 8–6 to win Players Championship 28 in August. He won his second World Grand Prix title in October, beating Gerwyn Price in the final.

== Personal life ==
Humphries is nicknamed "Cool Hand" in the reference to the 1967 film Cool Hand Luke. Like his father, he is a fan of football club Leeds United. He paraded his World Championship trophy at Elland Road during half-time of the club's match against Preston North End in January 2024. He uses Kaiser Chiefs' "I Predict a Riot" as his walk-on song due to the song's connection to Leeds United, having previously used DNCE's "Cake by the Ocean".

Humphries previously worked six years as a roofer in Newbury, retiring in 2018 to pursue darts full-time. During a match at the 2019 German Darts Open, Humphries suffered an anxiety attack. He considered quitting the sport as a result. He began a weight loss journey in 2021 in order to improve his fitness and stamina, which led to him losing four stone (56 pounds). He attributes his success in darts to his loss in weight, claiming that it has made him a stronger person and that he no longer runs out of energy during longer days of play.

Humphries lives in Crewe with his fiancée Kayley, his stepdaughter and son; their son was born in October 2022. On 30 May 2024, whilst in New York for the 2024 US Darts Masters, Humphries proposed to his partner on the top floor of The Edge. In June 2025, he was appointed a Member of the Order of the British Empire (MBE) in the 2025 Birthday Honours for services to darts.

== World Championship results ==
=== PDC World Championship ===
- 2018: Preliminary round (lost to Jeff Smith 0–2)
- 2019: Quarter-finals (lost to Michael Smith 1–5)
- 2020: Quarter-finals (lost to Peter Wright 3–5)
- 2021: First round (lost to Paul Lim 2–3)
- 2022: Quarter-finals (lost to Gary Anderson 2–5)
- 2023: Fourth round (lost to Stephen Bunting 1–4)
- 2024: Winner (beat Luke Littler 7–4)
- 2025: Fourth round (lost to Peter Wright 1–4)
- 2026: Quarter-finals (lost to Gian van Veen 1–5)

== Career finals ==
=== PDC major finals: 18 (9 titles) ===
Legend
World Championship (1–0)
World Matchplay (1–0)
UK Open (0–2)
Premier League (1–2)
World Grand Prix (2–2)
Grand Slam (1–1)
European Championship (0–1)
Players Championship Finals (2–0)
World Masters (1–1)

| Outcome | No. | Year | Championship | Opponent in the final | Score (Note: (l) = score in legs, (s) = score in sets.) |
|---|---|---|---|---|---|
| Runner-up | 1. | 2021 | UK Open | James Wade | 5–11 (l) |
| Winner | 1. | 2023 | World Grand Prix | Gerwyn Price | 5–2 (s) |
| Winner | 2. | 2023 | Grand Slam | Rob Cross | 16–8 (l) |
| Winner | 3. | 2023 | Players Championship Finals | Michael van Gerwen | 11–9 (l) |
| Winner | 4. | 2024 | World Championship | Luke Littler | 7–4 (s) |
| Runner-up | 2. | 2024 | UK Open (2) | Dimitri Van den Bergh | 10–11 (l) |
| Runner-up | 3. | 2024 | Premier League | Luke Littler | 7–11 (l) |
| Winner | 5. | 2024 | World Matchplay | Michael van Gerwen | 18–15 (l) |
| Runner-up | 4. | 2024 | World Grand Prix | Mike De Decker | 4–6 (s) |
| Winner | 6. | 2024 | Players Championship Finals (2) | Luke Littler | 11–7 (l) |
| Winner | 7. | 2025 | World Masters | Jonny Clayton | 6–5 (s) |
| Winner | 8. | 2025 | Premier League | Luke Littler | 11–8 (l) |
| Runner-up | 5. | 2025 | World Grand Prix (2) | Luke Littler | 1–6 (s) |
| Runner-up | 6. | 2025 | European Championship | Gian van Veen | 10–11 (l) |
| Runner-up | 7. | 2025 | Grand Slam | Luke Littler | 11–16 (l) |
| Runner-up | 8. | 2026 | World Masters | Luke Littler | 5–6 (s) |
| Runner-up | 9. | 2026 | Premier League | Luke Littler | 10–11 (l) |
| Winner | 9. | 2026 | World Grand Prix (2) | Gerwyn Price | 6–4 (s) |

=== PDC World Series finals: 5 (3 titles) ===
| Outcome | No. | Year | Championship | Opponent in the final | Score |
|---|---|---|---|---|---|
| Winner | 1. | 2024 | New Zealand Masters | Damon Heta | 8–2 (l) |
| Winner | 2. | 2025 | US Masters | Nathan Aspinall | 8–6 (l) |
| Runner-up | 1. | 2025 | New Zealand Masters | Luke Littler | 4–8 (l) |
| Runner-up | 2. | 2026 | Nordic Masters | Michael van Gerwen | 7–8 (l) |
| Winner | 3. | 2026 | US Masters (2) | Luke Littler | 8–7 (l) |

=== PDC team finals: 2 (2 titles) ===
| Outcome | No. | Year | Championship | Team | Teammate | Opponents in the final | Score |
|---|---|---|---|---|---|---|---|
| Winner | 1. | 2024 | World Cup of Darts | England | Michael Smith | Austria – Mensur Suljović and Rowby-John Rodriguez | 10–6 (l) |
| Winner | 2. | 2026 | World Cup of Darts | England | Luke Littler | Netherlands – Gian van Veen and Michael van Gerwen | 10–5 (l) |

== Performance timeline ==
=== PDC ===
| Tournament | 2016 | 2017 | 2018 | 2019 | 2020 | 2021 | 2022 | 2023 | 2024 | 2025 | 2026 |
|---|---|---|---|---|---|---|---|---|---|---|---|
PDC Ranked televised events
| World Championship | DNQ | | Prel. | QF | QF | 1R | QF | 4R | W | 4R | QF |
| World Masters (Note: A non-ranked event until 2025) | Did not qualify | | | | | | 2R | 2R | 2R | W | F |
| UK Open | DNQ | | 3R | 3R | 4R | F | 4R | 6R | F | QF | 6R |
| World Matchplay | Did not qualify | | | | | 2R | 1R | SF | W | 1R | 1R |
| World Grand Prix | Did not qualify | | | | | 2R | 1R | W | F | F | W |
| European Championship | Did not qualify | | | | | 2R | QF | QF | QF | F | WD |
| Grand Slam | Did not qualify | | | | RR | RR | SF | W | RR | F | 2R |
| Players Championship Finals | DNP | | | 1R | 3R | 3R | SF | W | W | 1R | |
PDC Non-ranked televised events
| Premier League | Did not participate | | | C | C | Did not participate | | | F | W | F |
| World Cup | Did not participate | | | | | | | | W | 2R | W |
| World Series Finals | Did not participate | | | | | | | SF | QF | QF | 2R |
| World Youth Championship | 2R | SF | 2R | W | Did not participate | | | | | | |
Career statistics
| Season-end ranking | NR | NR | 57 | 35 | 42 | 19 | 5 | 1 | 1 | 2 | |

==== Premier League ====
| Contender | Week 4 |
|---|---|
| 2019 | EXE; D |
| Contender | Week 5 |
| 2020 | EXE; W |

| Legend: | W | Win | D | Draw |

| Season | 1 | 2 | 3 | 4 | 5 | 6 | 7 | 8 | 9 | 10 | 11 | 12 | 13 | 14 | 15 | 16 | F |
|---|---|---|---|---|---|---|---|---|---|---|---|---|---|---|---|---|---|
| 2024 | CAR; QF | BER; SF | GLA; F | NEW; QF | EXE; SF | BRI; W | NOT; W | DUB; W | BEL; QF | MAN; QF | BIR; SF | ROT; SF | LIV; QF | ABD; SF | LEE; W | SHF; F | LON; F |
| 2025 | BEL; W | GLA; F | DUB; SF | EXE; W | BRI; QF | NOT; QF | CAR; QF | NEW; F | GLA; SF | MAN; F | ROT; QF | LIV; F | BIR; QF | LEE; W | ABD; QF | SHF; F | LON; W |
| 2026 | NEW; SF | ANT; QF | GLA; SF | BEL; QF | CAR; SF | NOT; F | DUB; SF | BER; QF | MAN; QF | BRI; QF | ROT; SF | LIV; QF | ABD; F | LEE; F | BIR; W | SHF; F | LON; F |

==== European Tour ====
| Season | 1 | 2 | 3 | 4 | 5 | 6 | 7 | 8 | 9 | 10 | 11 | 12 | 13 | 14 | 15 |
|---|---|---|---|---|---|---|---|---|---|---|---|---|---|---|---|
| 2018 | EDO; 1R | GDG; 3R | GDO; 2R | ADO; 2R | Did not qualify | | | | EDM; 2R | Did not qualify | | | EDT; 2R | | |
| 2019 | EDO; DNQ | GDC; 2R | GDG; DNQ | GDO; 2R | Did not qualify | | | | | ADC; 2R | Did not qualify | | | | |
| 2020 | BDC; 1R | Did not qualify | | | | | | | | | | | | | |
| 2021 | HDT; SF | GDT; 1R | | | | | | | | | | | | | |
| 2022 | IDO; DNQ | GDC; 2R | GDG; W | ADO; 2R | EDO; SF | CDO; W | EDG; W | DDC; WD | EDM; W | HDT; 2R | GDO; QF | BDO; WD | GDT; QF | | |
| 2023 | BSD; F | EDO; WD | IDO; WD | GDG; QF | ADO; 2R | DDC; F | BDO; F | CDO; QF | EDG; F | EDM; W | GDO; 3R | HDT; F | GDC; SF | | |
| 2024 | BDO; 3R | GDG; W | IDO; 3R | EDG; QF | ADO; WD | BSD; F | DDC; DNP | EDO; 2R | GDC; DNP | FDT; SF | HDT; 2R | SDT; QF | CDO; W | | |
| 2025 | BDO; 2R | EDT; QF | IDO; SF | GDG; WD | ADO; DNP | EDG; 3R | DDC; SF | EDO; WD | BSD; QF | FDT; WD | CDO; W | HDT; QF | SDT; 3R | GDC; WD | |
| 2026 | PDO; SF | EDT; WD | BDO; W | GDG; WD | EDG; DNP | ADO; DNP | IDO; WD | BSD; WD | SDO; DNP | EDO; DNP | HDT; 2R | CDO; F | FDT; WD | SDT; F | DDC; WD |

==== Players Championships ====
| Season | 1 | 2 | 3 | 4 | 5 | 6 | 7 | 8 | 9 | 10 | 11 | 12 | 13 | 14 | 15 | 16 | 17 | 18 | 19 | 20 | 21 | 22 | 23 | 24 | 25 | 26 | 27 | 28 | 29 | 30 | 31 | 32 | 33 | 34 |
|---|---|---|---|---|---|---|---|---|---|---|---|---|---|---|---|---|---|---|---|---|---|---|---|---|---|---|---|---|---|---|---|---|---|---|
| 2018 | BAR; 1R | BAR; 3R | BAR; 2R | BAR; 1R | MIL; 1R | MIL; 1R | BAR; 1R | BAR; 3R | WIG; 1R | WIG; 1R | MIL; 1R | MIL; 1R | WIG; 2R | WIG; 1R | BAR; 1R | BAR; 1R | BAR; 1R | BAR; 2R | DUB; 1R | DUB; 1R | BAR; 2R | BAR; SF | | | | | | | | | | | | |
| 2019 | WIG; 2R | WIG; 2R | WIG; 1R | WIG; 2R | BAR; 1R | BAR; 1R | WIG; 2R | WIG; 1R | BAR; 2R | BAR; 2R | BAR; 3R | BAR; 2R | BAR; 2R | BAR; 1R | BAR; DNP | | WIG; QF | WIG; 3R | BAR; 2R | BAR; 3R | HIL; 4R | HIL; 2R | BAR; 4R | BAR; 1R | BAR; 4R | BAR; DNP | DUB; 2R | DUB; 3R | BAR; 3R | BAR; 2R | | | | |
| 2020 | BAR; 1R | BAR; 1R | WIG; 1R | WIG; 3R | WIG; 3R | WIG; 2R | BAR; 4R | BAR; 3R | MIL; 1R | MIL; 2R | MIL; 1R | MIL; 2R | MIL; DNP | NIE; 2R | NIE; 1R | NIE; QF | NIE; 3R | NIE; 2R | COV; 3R | COV; 1R | COV; 1R | COV; 1R | COV; 1R | | | | | | | | | | | |
| 2021 | BOL; 1R | BOL; 1R | BOL; 3R | BOL; 2R | MIL; 2R | MIL; F | MIL; 3R | MIL; 3R | NIE; F | NIE; 2R | NIE; 1R | NIE; 3R | MIL; 2R | MIL; 3R | MIL; 2R | MIL; F | COV; 2R | COV; 2R | COV; 4R | COV; 1R | BAR; 4R | BAR; 1R | BAR; QF | BAR; 1R | BAR; 3R | BAR; 1R | BAR; 2R | BAR; 1R | BAR; 2R | BAR; 4R | | | | |
| 2022 | BAR; W | BAR; 4R | WIG; 1R | WIG; QF | BAR; 4R | BAR; 3R | NIE; 4R | NIE; SF | BAR; 3R | BAR; QF | BAR; 2R | BAR; 4R | BAR; 2R | WIG; 1R | WIG; DNP | NIE; QF | NIE; 3R | BAR; QF | BAR; SF | BAR; 4R | BAR; 2R | BAR; QF | BAR; 1R | BAR; F | BAR; QF | BAR; 2R | BAR; 3R | BAR; F | BAR; 1R | BAR; DNP | | | | |
| 2023 | BAR; 4R | BAR; SF | BAR; 3R | BAR; 1R | BAR; 3R | BAR; SF | HIL; 4R | HIL; 3R | WIG; 3R | WIG; 4R | LEI; 3R | LEI; 3R | HIL; DNP | | LEI; W | LEI; 1R | HIL; DNP | | BAR; 1R | BAR; W | BAR; QF | BAR; DNP | BAR; F | BAR; 1R | BAR; DNP | BAR; SF | BAR; 3R | BAR; DNP | | | | | | |
| 2024 | WIG; 2R | WIG; 1R | Did not participate | | | | LEI; 3R | LEI; F | HIL; DNP | | | | | MIL; 4R | MIL; 4R | MIL; SF | MIL; DNP | | | WIG; QF | WIG; 1R | LEI; 3R | LEI; 4R | WIG; 4R | WIG; 1R | WIG; W | WIG; 4R | WIG; 2R | LEI; DNP | | | | | |
| 2025 | WIG; SF | DNP | | | LEI; 3R | LEI; F | Did not participate | | | | LEI; 2R | LEI; 3R | Did not participate | | | | | | | | | | | | | HIL; 2R | HIL; 1R | LEI; 1R | LEI; QF | LEI; 3R | WIG; 2R | WIG; 2R | WIG; 1R | WIG; 2R |
| 2026 | HIL; DNP | | WIG; 3R | WIG; W | LEI; DNP | | | | WIG; 4R | WIG; 1R | MIL; 3R | MIL; 1R | Did not participate | | | | LEI; W | Did not participate | | | | | | | | | LEI; 1R | LEI; W | ROS; DNP | | | | LEI; W | LEI; F |

==== World Series ====
| Tournament | 2023 | 2024 | 2025 | 2026 |
|---|---|---|---|---|
| Bahrain Masters | QF | QF | SF | QF |
| Nordic Masters | QF | SF | QF | F |
| US Masters | SF | SF | W | W |
| Poland Masters | QF | QF | DNP | NH |
| New Zealand Masters | DNP | W | F | DNP |
| Dutch Masters | DNP | QF | 1R | NH |
| Australian Masters | NH | QF | QF | DNP |
| Saudi Masters | NH | | | QF |

Key

Performance Table Legend
| W | Won the tournament | F | Finalist | SF | Semifinalist | QF | Quarterfinalist | #R; RR; Prel. | Lost in # round Round-robin; Preliminary round | DQ | Disqualified |
| DNQ | Did not qualify | DNP | Did not participate | WD | Withdrew | NH | Tournament not held | #R; RR; Prel. | Lost in # round Round-robin; Preliminary round | NYF | Not yet founded |

== Titles ==
The following is a list of titles won by Luke Humphries in his career.

=== PDC ===
- Majors (9)
  - World Championship (1): 2024
  - World Matchplay (1): 2024
  - World Grand Prix (2): 2023, 2026
  - Grand Slam of Darts (1): 2023
  - Premier League Darts (1): 2025
  - Players Championship Finals (2): 2023, 2024
  - World Masters (1): 2025
- World Cup (2)
  - 2024
  - 2026
- World Series (3)
  - New Zealand Masters (1): 2024
  - US Masters (2): 2025, 2026
- Pro Tour (17)
  - European Tour (9)
    - Belgian Open (1): 2026
    - Czech Open (3): 2022, 2024, 2025
    - European Grand Prix (1): 2022
    - European Matchplay (2): 2022, 2023
    - German Grand Prix (2): 2022, 2024
  - Players Championships (8)
    - 2022 (1): 1
    - 2023 (2): 15, 20
    - 2024 (1): 26
    - 2026 (4): 4, 17, 28, 33
- Secondary Tours
  - Challenge Tour (1)
    - 2017 (1): 12
  - PDC Development Tour (11)
    - 2017 (5): 1, 4, 9, 16, 20
    - 2018 (3): 7, 3, 17
    - 2019 (3): 11, 17, 20
- World Youth Championship (1)
  - 2019
- Home Tour (1)
  - 2020 (1): 2

== Nine-dart finishes ==
Luke Humphries's televised nine-dart finishes
| Date | Opponent | Tournament | Method | Ref. |
|---|---|---|---|---|
| 6 March 2025 | Rob Cross | 2025 Premier League Darts | 3 x T20; 3 x T20; T20, T19, D12 | |
| 9 November 2025 | Michael Smith | 2025 Grand Slam of Darts | 2 x T20, T19; 3 x T20; 2 x T20, D12 | |
| 31 January 2026 | Luke Woodhouse | 2026 PDC World Masters | 3 x T20; 3 x T20; T20, T19, D12 | |

Sporting positions
| Preceded by Michael Smith | PDC World Number One; 3 January 2024 – 16 November 2025 | Succeeded by Luke Littler |
Awards
| Preceded by Michael Smith | PDC Player of the Year; 2023 | Succeeded by Luke Littler |
