= 2025 Premier League Darts =

Darts competition

2025 BetMGM Premier League Darts

Tournament information
- Dates: 6 February – 29 May 2025
- Nine-dart finish: Gerwyn Price (×2); Luke Humphries; Rob Cross; Luke Littler

Champion(s)
- Luke Humphries (ENG)

The 2025 Premier League Darts, also known as the 2025 BetMGM Premier League Darts for sponsorship reasons, was a darts tournament organised by the Professional Darts Corporation – the twenty-first edition of the tournament. The event began on Thursday 6 February 2025, at the SSE Arena in Belfast, and ended with the play-offs, at The O_{2} Arena in London on Thursday 29 May 2025.

Luke Littler was the defending champion after defeating Luke Humphries 11–7 in the 2024 final, but was defeated by Humphries 11–8 in the final, who won his first Premier League title and completed the Triple Crown.

There were five nine-dart finishes hit over the course of the tournament. Night five produced the first two; Humphries hit the first in his 6–4 loss to Rob Cross, then Cross hit his own perfect leg in his semi-final against Nathan Aspinall, a match he lost 6–5. Littler hit the third nine-dart finish of the tournament in his night seven final win against Michael van Gerwen. Gerwyn Price hit the fourth on night 10 in his 6–3 quarter-final loss against Littler. On night 15, Price hit his second nine-dart finish and the fifth of the tournament in his 6–4 quarter-final loss to Stephen Bunting.

Luke Littler achieved a record six nightly wins during the league stage and also broke his own seasonal points record, finishing on 45 points.

== Format ==
The 2025 Premier League Darts used the same format that was introduced for the 2022 edition. It remained an eight-person knockout bracket every night, with each of the seven matches played as the first to six legs. The players were guaranteed to meet each other once in the quarter-finals throughout the first seven weeks, and once in the quarter-finals in weeks 9–15, with weeks 8 and 16 being drawn based on the league standings at that point. Players received two points per semi-final finish, three points per runner-up finish, and five points per final win.

Following the league phase, the top four players in the table contested the two knockout semi-finals with 1st playing 4th and 2nd playing 3rd.

== Venues ==
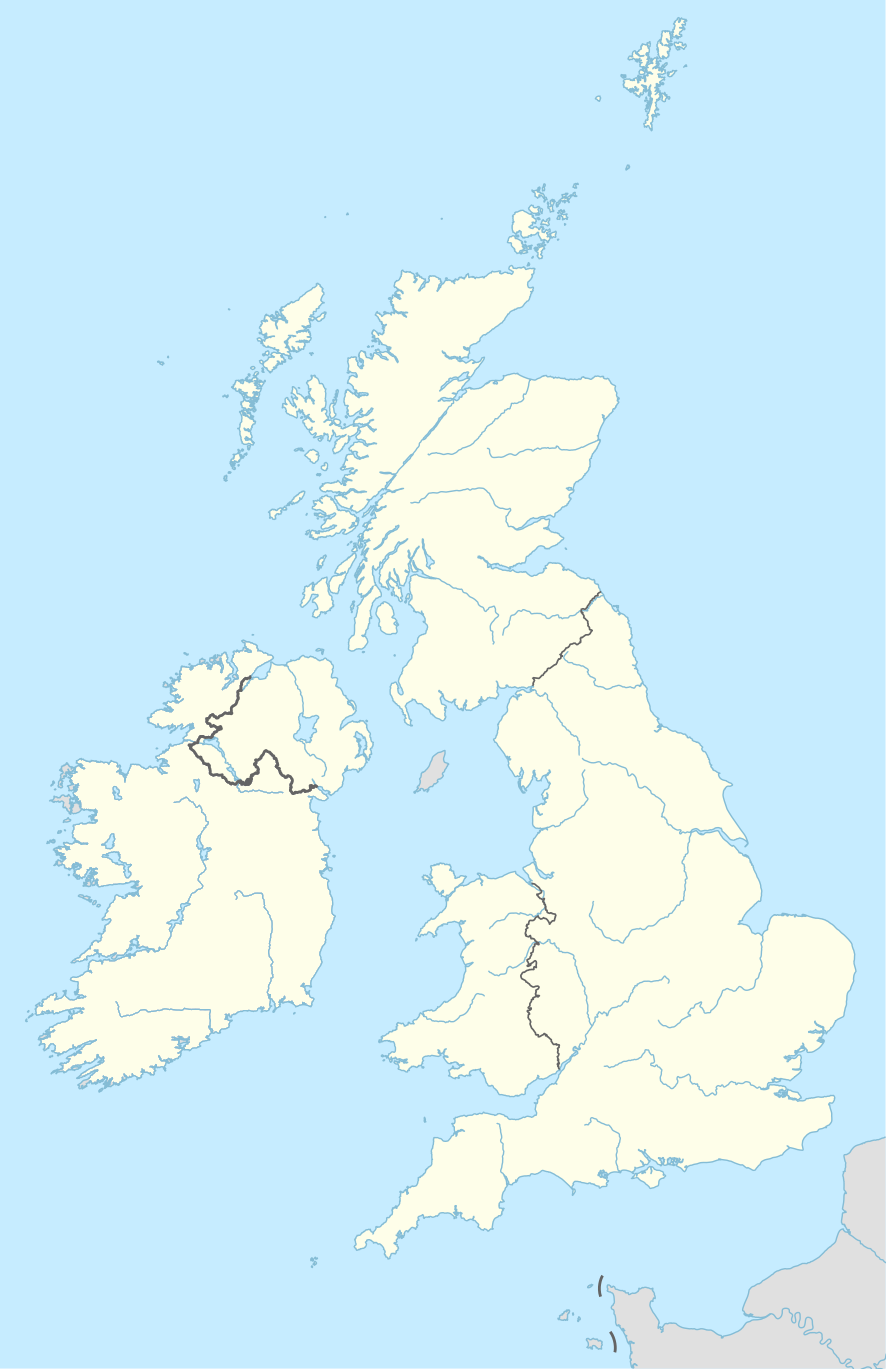
Locations of the 2025 Premier League venues in the UK and Ireland.
Other locations of the 2025 Premier League venues in Europe.

(Northern Ireland) Belfast	(Scotland) Glasgow	(Republic of Ireland) Dublin	(England) Exeter
SSE Arena Belfast Thursday 6 February	OVO Hydro Thursday 13 February	3Arena Thursday 20 February	Westpoint Exeter Thursday 27 February
(England) Brighton	(England) Nottingham	(Wales) Cardiff	(England) Newcastle
Brighton Centre Thursday 6 March	Nottingham Arena Thursday 13 March	Cardiff International Arena Thursday 20 March	Newcastle Arena Thursday 27 March
(Germany) Berlin	(England) Manchester	(Netherlands) Rotterdam	(England) Liverpool
Uber Arena Thursday 3 April	Manchester Arena Thursday 10 April	Rotterdam Ahoy Thursday 17 April	Liverpool Arena Thursday 24 April
(England) Birmingham	(England) Leeds	(Scotland) Aberdeen	(England) Sheffield
Arena Birmingham Thursday 1 May	Leeds Arena Thursday 8 May	P&J Live Thursday 15 May	Sheffield Arena Thursday 22 May
(England) London
The O_{2} Thursday 29 May

== Prize money ==
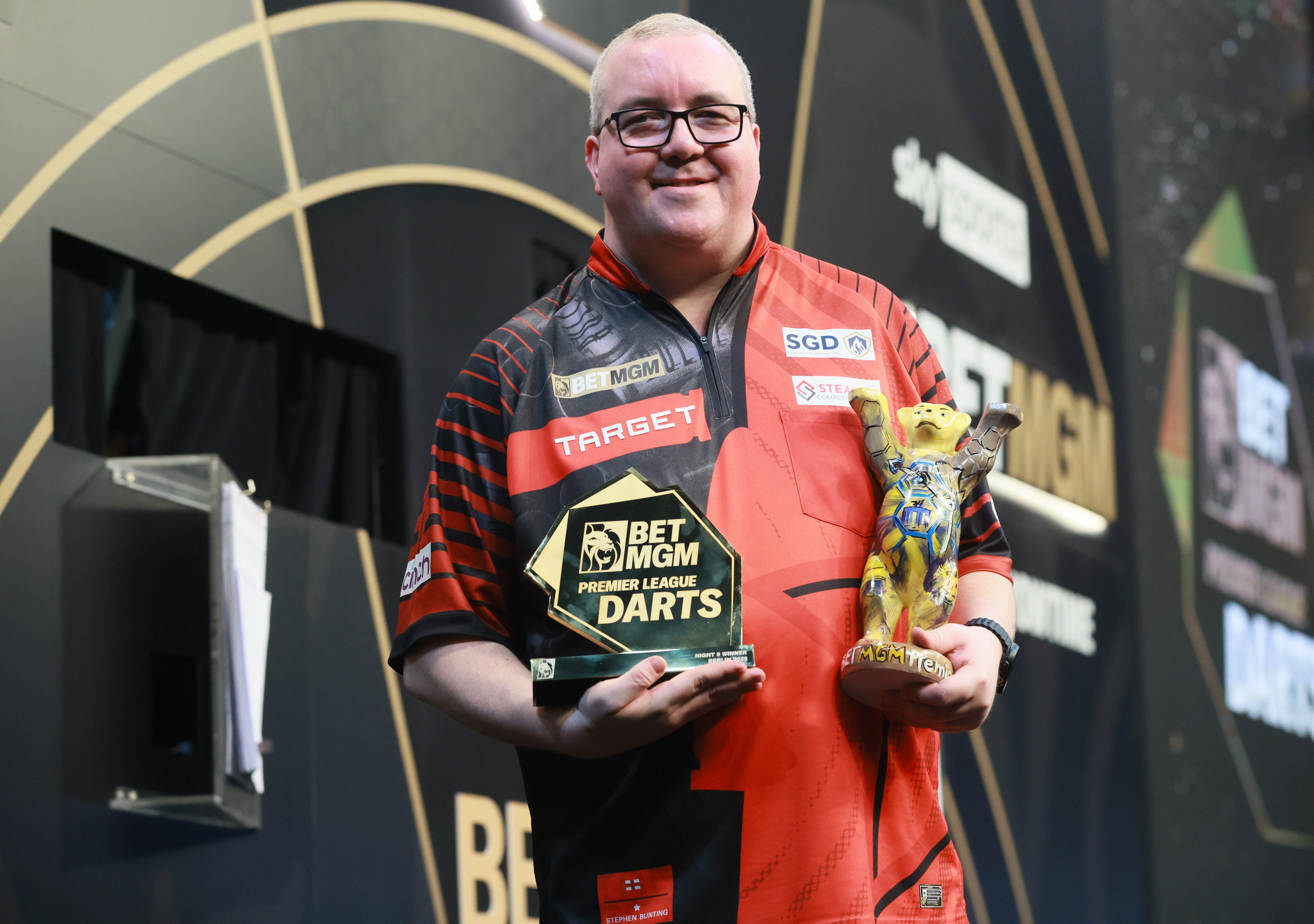
Stephen Bunting received a weekly bonus for winning night nine.

The prize money for the 2025 edition of the tournament remained at £1 million, including a £10,000 bonus to each night's winner.

Stage	Prize money
Winner	£275,000
Runner-up	£125,000
Semi-finalists (x2)	£85,000
5th place	£75,000
6th place	£70,000
7th place	£65,000
8th place	£60,000
Weekly Winner Bonus (x16)	£10,000
Total	£1,000,000

== Players ==
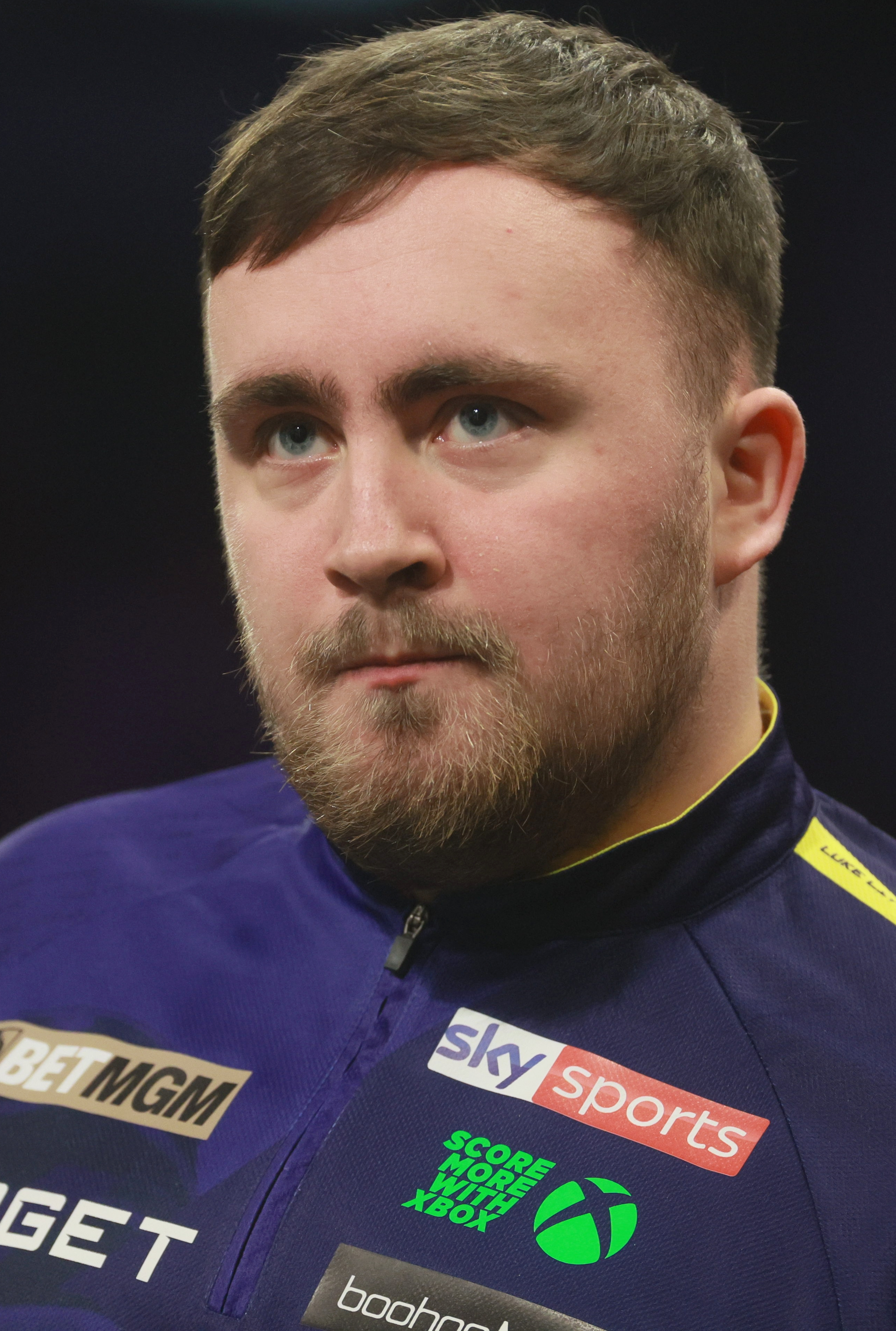
Luke Littler was the defending champion going into the tournament.

The top four players on the PDC Order of Merit—Luke Humphries, Luke Littler, Michael van Gerwen and Rob Cross—automatically qualified. The remaining four players were announced on 6 January 2025 live on Sky Sports News. The announcement saw two changes made from the 2024 lineup, with Stephen Bunting and Chris Dobey replacing Peter Wright and Michael Smith. Former participants and Scottish World Cup duo Wright and Gary Anderson were not selected, marking the first Premier League line-up to not feature a player representing Scotland since 2010. Reigning World Grand Prix champion Mike De Decker became the first victor of a premier event televised on Sky Sports to miss out on selection the following year.

Player	Appearance in Premier League	Consecutive Streak	Order of Merit Rank	Previous best performance
Luke Humphries	2nd (Note: Humphries had previously appeared as a one-off challenger in both 2019 and 2020.)	2	1	Runner-up: (2024)
Luke Littler	2nd	2	2	Winner: (2024)
Michael van Gerwen	13th	13	3	Winner: (2013, 2016, 2017, 2018, 2019, 2022, 2023)
Rob Cross	6th	2	4	Runner-up: (2019)
Stephen Bunting	2nd (Note: Bunting had additionally appeared as a one-off challenger in 2020.)	1	5	8th: (2015)
Gerwyn Price	7th	4	9	Runner-up: (2023)
Chris Dobey	2nd (Note: Dobey had additionally appeared as a one-off challenger in 2019 and 2020.)	1	10	7th: (2023)
Nathan Aspinall	5th (Note: Aspinall had additionally appeared as a one-off challenger in 2019.)	3	11	Runner up: (2020)

== League stage ==
The fixtures were released on 22 January 2025. Match winners are shown in bold and all players are accompanied by their three-dart average for the match.

=== 6 February – Night 1 ===
(Northern Ireland) **SSE Arena, Belfast**

Luke Humphries was the winner on Night 1, defeating Chris Dobey 6–1 in the night's final.

**Quarter-finals** (best of 11 legs)
**Chris Dobey 97.87**	**6**
Gerwyn Price 96.21	4
Stephen Bunting 94.03	4
**Rob Cross 97.61**	**6**
Luke Littler 113.91	5
**Michael van Gerwen 105.91**	**6**
Nathan Aspinall 95.73	2
**Luke Humphries 105.19**	**6**

**Semi-finals** (best of 11 legs)
**Chris Dobey 92.69**	**6**
Rob Cross 89.55	4
Michael van Gerwen 101.51	5
**Luke Humphries 99.31**	**6**

**Final** (best of 11 legs)
Chris Dobey 96.88	1
**Luke Humphries 95.86**	**6**

Night 1 Statistics
Night's Total Average: **98.63**
Highest Checkout: Chris Dobey **170**
Most 180s: Chris Dobey and Michael van Gerwen **9**
Night's 180s: **38**

=== 13 February – Night 2 ===
(Scotland) **OVO Hydro, Glasgow**

Luke Littler was the winner on Night 2, defeating Luke Humphries 6–5 in the night’s final.

**Quarter-finals** (best of 11 legs)
Rob Cross 99.96	5
**Luke Littler 104.59**	**6**
**Michael van Gerwen 109.16**	**6**
Stephen Bunting 93.91	1
Nathan Aspinall 96.25	4
**Gerwyn Price 94.46**	**6**
**Luke Humphries 106.07**	**6**
Chris Dobey 97.57	4

**Semi-finals** (best of 11 legs)
**Luke Littler 104.02**	**6**
Michael van Gerwen 98.52	2
Gerwyn Price 97.63	4
**Luke Humphries 101.98**	**6**

**Final** (best of 11 legs)
**Luke Littler 101.03**	**6**
Luke Humphries 93.68	5

Night 2 Statistics
Night's Total Average: **99.79**
Highest Checkout: Luke Littler **170**
Most 180s: Luke Humphries and Luke Littler **11**
Night's 180s: **46**

=== 20 February – Night 3 ===
(Republic of Ireland) **3Arena, Dublin**

Gerwyn Price was the winner on Night 3, defeating Nathan Aspinall 6–3 in the night's final.

**Quarter-finals** (best of 11 legs)
**Luke Humphries 103.51**	**6**
Stephen Bunting 100.49	4
**Gerwyn Price 102.64**	**6**
Luke Littler 99.78	4
Rob Cross 90.42	3
**Nathan Aspinall 85.53**	**6**
**Michael van Gerwen 98.96**	**6**
Chris Dobey 96.99	4

**Semi-finals** (best of 11 legs)
Luke Humphries 93.56	3
**Gerwyn Price 96.26**	**6**
**Nathan Aspinall 99.22**	**6**
Michael van Gerwen 93.21	3

**Final** (best of 11 legs)
**Gerwyn Price 100.57**	**6**
Nathan Aspinall 90.83	3

Night 3 Statistics
Night's Total Average: **96.74**
Highest Checkout: Gerwyn Price **170**
Most 180s: Nathan Aspinall **14**
Night's 180s: **45**

=== 27 February – Night 4 ===
(England) **Westpoint Exeter, Exeter**

Luke Humphries was the winner on Night 4, defeating Luke Littler 6–4 in the night’s final.

**Quarter-finals** (best of 11 legs)
Michael van Gerwen 92.88	5
**Rob Cross 99.33**	**6**
Gerwyn Price 89.77	4
**Luke Humphries 97.22**	**6**
Chris Dobey 92.98	5
**Nathan Aspinall 93.69**	**6**
Stephen Bunting 104.89	3
**Luke Littler 112.34**	**6**

**Semi-finals** (best of 11 legs)
Rob Cross 98.81	5
**Luke Humphries 100.08**	**6**
Nathan Aspinall 95.21	2
**Luke Littler 109.67**	**6**

**Final** (best of 11 legs)
**Luke Humphries 101.24**	**6**
Luke Littler 96.82	4

Night 4 Statistics
Night's Total Average: **98.32**
Highest Checkout: Luke Humphries **167**
Most 180s: Luke Littler **20**
Night's 180s: **57**

=== 6 March – Night 5 ===
(England) **Brighton Centre, Brighton**

Luke Littler was the winner on Night 5, defeating Nathan Aspinall 6–3 in the night's final.

**Quarter-finals** (best of 11 legs)
Gerwyn Price 90.11	3
**Michael van Gerwen 95.36**	**6**
**Luke Littler 97.83**	**6**
Chris Dobey 100.21	5
**Rob Cross 111.19**	**6**
Luke Humphries 98.60	4
Stephen Bunting 97.06	2
**Nathan Aspinall 106.46**	**6**

**Semi-finals** (best of 11 legs)
Michael van Gerwen 90.41	2
**Luke Littler 106.11**	**6**
Rob Cross 106.91	5
**Nathan Aspinall 96.49**	**6**

**Final** (best of 11 legs)
**Luke Littler 100.47**	**6**
Nathan Aspinall 94.54	3

Night 5 Statistics
Night's Total Average: **99.40**
Highest Checkout: Luke Humphries and Rob Cross **141**
Most 180s: Luke Littler **12**
Night's 180s: **49**
Nine-Dart Finish: Luke Humphries and Rob Cross

=== 13 March – Night 6 ===
(England) **Nottingham Arena, Nottingham**

Gerwyn Price was the winner on Night 6, defeating Luke Littler 6–3 in the night's final.

**Quarter-finals** (best of 11 legs)
Luke Humphries 99.49	4
**Luke Littler 100.15**	**6**
**Rob Cross 100.90**	**6**
Chris Dobey 98.79	2
Stephen Bunting 102.11	4
**Gerwyn Price 97.86**	**6**
Nathan Aspinall 89.04	4
**Michael van Gerwen 95.13**	**6**

**Semi-finals** (best of 11 legs)
**Luke Littler 107.82**	**6**
Rob Cross 103.88	3
**Gerwyn Price 107.25**	**6**
Michael van Gerwen 97.58	1

**Final** (best of 11 legs)
Luke Littler 103.39	3
**Gerwyn Price 94.10**	**6**

Night 6 Statistics
Night's Total Average: **99.45**
Highest Checkout: Stephen Bunting **170**
Most 180s: Luke Littler **16**
Night's 180s: **42**

=== 20 March – Night 7 ===
(Wales) **Cardiff International Arena, Cardiff**

Luke Littler was the winner on Night 7, defeating Michael van Gerwen 6–4 in the night's final.

**Quarter-finals** (best of 11 legs)
**Chris Dobey 90.27**	**6**
Stephen Bunting 87.05	2
Luke Humphries 101.93	4
**Michael van Gerwen 104.04**	**6**
**Luke Littler 102.21**	**6**
Nathan Aspinall 88.73	3
Gerwyn Price 97.10	5
**Rob Cross 89.40**	**6**

**Semi-finals** (best of 11 legs)
Chris Dobey 82.28	1
**Michael van Gerwen 91.53**	**6**
**Luke Littler 107.67**	**6**
Rob Cross 99.80	2

**Final** (best of 11 legs)
Michael van Gerwen 101.41	4
**Luke Littler 112.50**	**6**

Night 7 Statistics
**Night's Total Average: 96.78**
Highest Checkout: Rob Cross **170**
Most 180s: Luke Littler **22**
**Night's 180s: 52**
Nine-Dart Finish: Luke Littler

=== 27 March – Night 8 ===
(England) **Newcastle Arena, Newcastle**

Luke Littler was the winner on Night 8, defeating Luke Humphries 6–1 in the night's final.

**Quarter-finals** (best of 11 legs)
**1**	**Luke Littler 109.98**	**6**
8	Stephen Bunting 102.15	0
4	Gerwyn Price 86.17	2
**5**	**Rob Cross 100.87**	**6**
**2**	**Luke Humphries 92.93**	**6**
7	Chris Dobey 93.60	3
3	Michael van Gerwen 96.04	5
**6**	**Nathan Aspinall 97.09**	**6**

**Semi-finals** (best of 11 legs)
**1**	**Luke Littler 97.51**	**6**
5	Rob Cross 94.98	3
**2**	**Luke Humphries 106.73**	**6**
6	Nathan Aspinall 101.18	5

**Final** (best of 11 legs)
**1**	**Luke Littler 93.62**	**6**
2	Luke Humphries 93.31	1

Night 8 Statistics
**Night's Total Average: 97.36**
Highest Checkout: Nathan Aspinall **142**
Most 180s: Luke Littler **10**
**Night's 180s: 37**

=== 3 April – Night 9 ===
(Germany) **Uber Arena, Berlin**

Stephen Bunting was the winner on Night 9, defeating Gerwyn Price 6–5 in the night's final. Michael van Gerwen withdrew due to a shoulder injury.

**Quarter-finals** (best of 11 legs)
Nathan Aspinall 100.23	2
**Stephen Bunting 103.40**	**6**
**Luke Humphries 98.00**	**6**
Rob Cross 99.68	3
**Chris Dobey 93.23**	**6**
Luke Littler 93.28	2
Michael van Gerwen	w/d
**Gerwyn Price**	**w/o**

**Semi-finals** (best of 11 legs)
**Stephen Bunting 95.66**	**6**
Luke Humphries 87.83	2
Chris Dobey 96.94	2
**Gerwyn Price 92.42**	**6**

**Final** (best of 11 legs)
**Stephen Bunting 93.73**	**6**
Gerwyn Price 93.12	5

Night 9 Statistics
**Night's Total Average: 95.63**
Highest Checkout: Rob Cross **110**
Most 180s: Stephen Bunting **12**
**Night's 180s: 35**

=== 10 April – Night 10 ===
(England) **Manchester Arena, Manchester**

Nathan Aspinall was the winner on Night 10, defeating Luke Humphries 6–4 in the night's final.

**Quarter-finals** (best of 11 legs)
Chris Dobey 94.32	4
**Michael van Gerwen 97.20**	**6**
**Nathan Aspinall 96.00**	**6**
Rob Cross 97.93	2
**Luke Littler 103.93**	**6**
Gerwyn Price 103.47	3
Stephen Bunting 105.33	1
**Luke Humphries 118.43**	**6**

**Semi-finals** (best of 11 legs)
Michael van Gerwen 85.59	2
**Nathan Aspinall 101.31**	**6**
Luke Littler 96.63	4
**Luke Humphries 93.80**	**6**

**Final** (best of 11 legs)
**Nathan Aspinall 93.29**	**6**
Luke Humphries 98.55	4

Night 10 Statistics
**Night's Total Average: 98.20**
Highest Checkout: Luke Humphries **142**
Most 180s: Nathan Aspinall **11**
**Night's 180s: 45**
Nine-Dart Finish: Gerwyn Price

=== 17 April – Night 11 ===
(Netherlands) **Rotterdam Ahoy, Rotterdam**

Chris Dobey was the winner on Night 11, defeating Stephen Bunting 6–2 in the night's final.

**Quarter-finals** (best of 11 legs)
**Chris Dobey 100.49**	**6**
Luke Humphries 90.17	3
Gerwyn Price 94.19	3
**Nathan Aspinall 97.02**	**6**
**Stephen Bunting 99.76**	**6**
Michael van Gerwen 89.86	5
**Luke Littler 108.56**	**6**
Rob Cross 110.15	5

**Semi-finals** (best of 11 legs)
**Chris Dobey 100.67**	**6**
Nathan Aspinall 90.03	2
**Stephen Bunting 106.43**	**6**
Luke Littler 101.39	5

**Final** (best of 11 legs)
**Chris Dobey 101.84**	**6**
Stephen Bunting 97.12	2

Night 11 Statistics
**Night's Total Average: 99.28**
Highest Checkout: Nathan Aspinall **170**
Most 180s: Chris Dobey **14**
**Night's 180s: 49**

=== 24 April – Night 12 ===
(England) **Liverpool Arena, Liverpool**

Gerwyn Price was the winner on Night 12, defeating Luke Humphries 6–4 in the night's final.

**Quarter-finals** (best of 11 legs)
**Luke Humphries 113.50**	**6**
Nathan Aspinall 104.03	3
**Michael van Gerwen 95.53**	**6**
Luke Littler 98.77	5
**Rob Cross 100.05**	**6**
Stephen Bunting 91.01	1
**Gerwyn Price 106.74**	**6**
Chris Dobey 105.61	2

**Semi-finals** (best of 11 legs)
**Luke Humphries 98.22**	**6**
Michael van Gerwen 98.21	4
Rob Cross 86.51	2
**Gerwyn Price 105.27**	**6**

**Final** (best of 11 legs)
Luke Humphries 102.64	4
**Gerwyn Price 104.43**	**6**

Night 12 Statistics
**Night's Total Average: 100.56**
Highest Checkout: Luke Littler **160**
Most 180s: Gerwyn Price **9**
**Night's 180s: 34**

=== 1 May – Night 13 ===
(England) **Arena Birmingham, Birmingham**

Luke Littler was the winner on Night 13, defeating Michael van Gerwen 6–4 in the night's final.

**Quarter-finals** (best of 11 legs)
**Luke Littler 98.11**	**6**
Stephen Bunting 95.25	5
**Nathan Aspinall 92.28**	**6**
Chris Dobey 87.43	3
Luke Humphries 107.46	5
**Gerwyn Price 99.43**	**6**
Rob Cross 97.97	4
**Michael van Gerwen 95.79**	**6**

**Semi-finals** (best of 11 legs)
**Luke Littler 96.56**	**6**
Nathan Aspinall 98.16	5
Gerwyn Price 80.53	3
**Michael van Gerwen 91.98**	**6**

**Final** (best of 11 legs)
**Luke Littler 102.50**	**6**
Michael van Gerwen 94.31	4

Night 13 Statistics
**Night's Total Average: 95.68**
Highest Checkout: Michael van Gerwen **130**
Most 180s: Luke Littler **13**
**Night's 180s: 44**

=== 8 May – Night 14 ===
(England) **Leeds Arena, Leeds**

Luke Humphries was the winner on Night 14, defeating Luke Littler 6–5 in the night's final.

**Quarter-finals** (best of 11 legs)
Rob Cross 88.76	5
**Gerwyn Price 94.16**	**6**
Nathan Aspinall 95.81	4
**Luke Littler 91.41**	**6**
Michael van Gerwen 92.08	4
**Luke Humphries 98.89**	**6**
**Stephen Bunting 97.46**	**6**
Chris Dobey 99.43	5

**Semi-finals** (best of 11 legs)
Gerwyn Price 97.82	3
**Luke Littler 104.29**	**6**
**Luke Humphries 91.94**	**6**
Stephen Bunting 95.70	4

**Final** (best of 11 legs)
Luke Littler 99.89	5
**Luke Humphries 100.96**	**6**

Night 14 Statistics
**Night's Total Average: 96.13**
Highest Checkout: Nathan Aspinall **164**
Most 180s: Luke Humphries **10**
**Night's 180s: 39**

=== 15 May – Night 15 ===
(Scotland) **P&J Live, Aberdeen**

Nathan Aspinall was the winner on Night 15, defeating Chris Dobey 6–1 in the night's final.

**Quarter-finals** (best of 11 legs)
Michael van Gerwen 97.52	3
**Nathan Aspinall 97.20**	**6**
Gerwyn Price 91.56	4
**Stephen Bunting 94.82**	**6**
**Chris Dobey 107.08**	**6**
Rob Cross 100.42	2
**Luke Littler 115.96**	**6**
Luke Humphries 110.01	3

**Semi-finals** (best of 11 legs)
**Nathan Aspinall 94.19**	**6**
Stephen Bunting 95.63	1
**Chris Dobey 97.89**	**6**
Luke Littler 101.44	5

**Final** (best of 11 legs)
**Nathan Aspinall 92.77**	**6**
Chris Dobey 98.39	1

Night 15 Statistics
**Night's Total Average: 99.40**
Highest Checkout: Luke Littler **144**
Most 180s: Luke Littler and Chris Dobey **13**
**Night's 180s: 57**
Nine-Dart Finish: Gerwyn Price

=== 22 May – Night 16 ===
(England) **Sheffield Arena, Sheffield**

Luke Littler was the winner on Night 16, defeating Luke Humphries 6–3 in the night's final.

**Quarter-finals** (best of 11 legs)
**1**	**Luke Littler 114.37**	**6**
8	Stephen Bunting 94.14	1
**4**	**Nathan Aspinall 98.72**	**6**
5	Michael van Gerwen 88.72	2
**2**	**Luke Humphries 97.41**	**6**
7	Rob Cross 95.91	4
3	Gerwyn Price 103.96	5
**6**	**Chris Dobey 108.91**	**6**

**Semi-finals** (best of 11 legs)
**1**	**Luke Littler 98.42**	**6**
4	Nathan Aspinall 96.42	4
**2**	**Luke Humphries 106.04**	**6**
6	Chris Dobey 98.18	2

**Final** (best of 11 legs)
**1**	**Luke Littler 96.99**	**6**
2	Luke Humphries 92.93	3

Night 16 Statistics
**Night's Total Average: 99.23**
Highest Checkout: Luke Littler **170**
Most 180s: Chris Dobey **10**
**Night's 180s: 39**

== 29 May – Play-offs ==
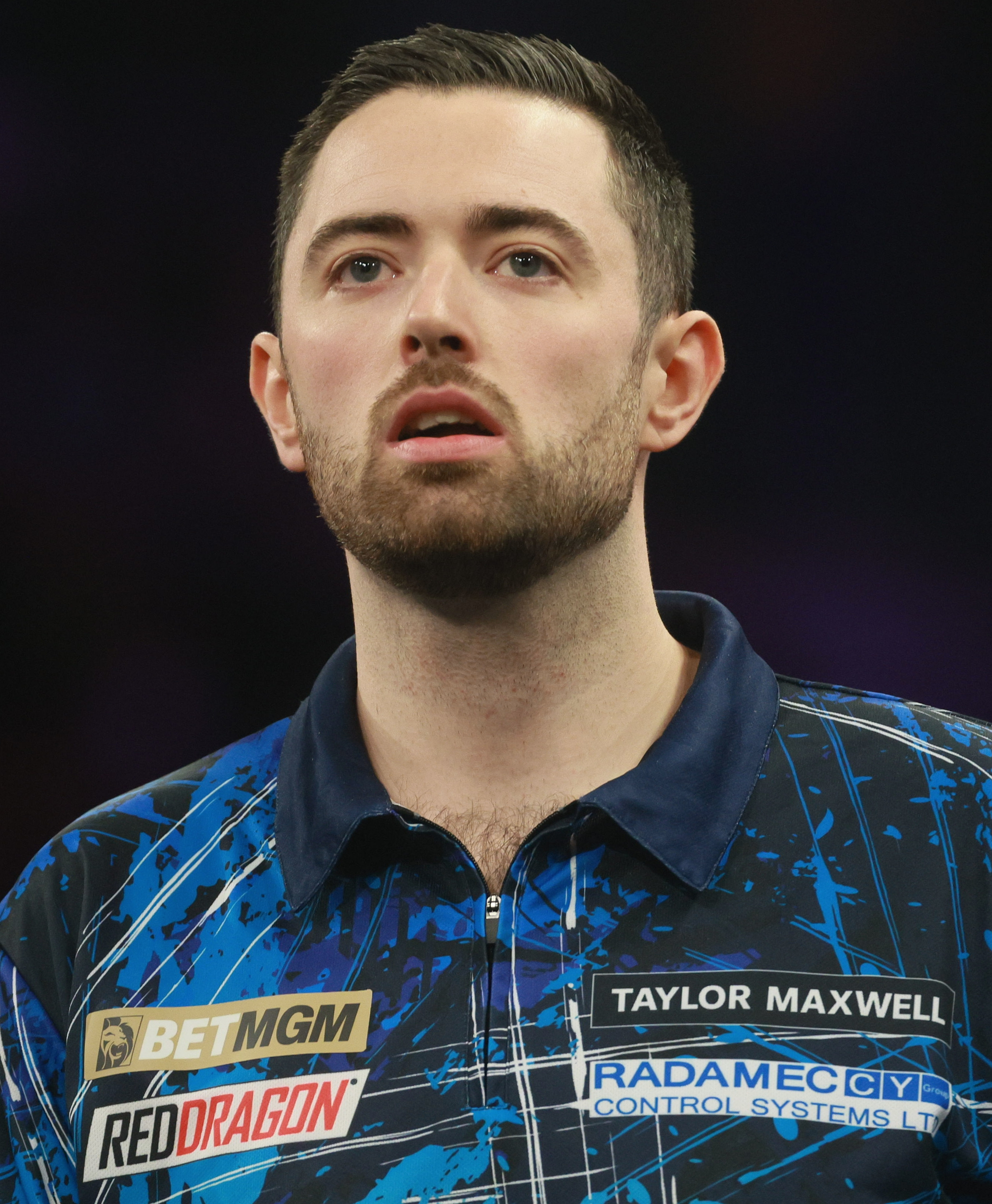
Luke Humphries won his first Premier League title.

The top four players of the league stage contested the play-offs to decide the champion of the Premier League.

Luke Humphries won the Premier League for the first time, defeating Luke Littler 11–8 in the final. This made Humphries the fourth player to complete the PDC Triple Crown after Gary Anderson, Phil Taylor and Michael van Gerwen.

(England) The O_{2}, London

	Score	
Semi-finals (best of 19 legs)
Luke Littler 104.64	10–7	Gerwyn Price 95.37
Luke Humphries 105.81	10–7	Nathan Aspinall 101.76
Final (best of 21 legs)
Luke Littler 100.29	8–11	Luke Humphries 97.86
Night's Total Average: 100.83
Highest Checkout: Gerwyn Price 132
Most 180s: Luke Littler 16
Night's 180s: 38

== Final standings ==
Five points are awarded for a night win, three points for the runner-up and two points for the losing semi-finalists. When players are tied on points, nights won is used first as a tie-breaker and after that overall matches won.

The top four players after 16 nights advanced to the play-offs.

Pos	Name	Nights					Matches			Legs				Scoring						
Pos	Name	Pts	W	RU	SF	QF	Pld	W	L	LF	LA	LD	LWAT	100+	140+	180	A	HC	CR	C%
1	Luke Littler (RU)	45	6	3	3	4	37	27	10	204	147	57	76	221	180	169	102.43	170	204/454	44.94%
2	Luke Humphries (C)	34	3	5	2	6	34	21	13	171	153	18	67	245	170	101	99.67	167	171/416	41.11%
3	Nathan Aspinall	26	2	2	5	7	29	15	14	136	128	8	55	213	112	93	95.70	170	136/354	38.41%
4	Gerwyn Price	24	3	1	3	9	27	14	13	126	120	7	48	189	78	71	96.60	170	126/331	38.06%
5	Michael van Gerwen	20	0	2	7	6	26	11	15	117	134	–17	47	166	95	70	96.07	130	117/307	38.11%
6	Chris Dobey	17	1	2	3	10	25	10	15	104	121	–17	41	164	89	87	97.19	170	108/259	41.70%
7	Rob Cross	14	0	0	7	9	23	7	16	99	119	–20	34	138	86	55	98.18	170	99/234	42.30%
8	Stephen Bunting	12	1	1	2	12	22	7	15	77	118	–41	26	150	102	62	97.48	170	77/223	34.52%

(C) Champion
(RU) Runner-up
(E) Eliminated
(Q) Qualified

As of 22 May 2025
(Week 16 of 16)

== Streaks ==
Player	Nights																
Player	1	2	3	4	5	6	7	8	9	10	11	12	13	14	15	16	Play-offs
Luke Littler	QF	W	QF	RU	W	RU	W		QF	SF		QF	W	RU	SF	W	RU
Luke Humphries	W	RU	SF	W	QF			RU	SF	RU	QF	RU	QF	W	QF	RU	W
Nathan Aspinall	QF		RU	SF	RU	QF		SF	QF	W	SF	QF	SF	QF	W	SF	SF
Gerwyn Price	QF	SF	W	QF		W	QF		RU	QF		W	SF		QF		SF
Michael van Gerwen	SF			QF	SF		RU	QF	WD	SF	QF	SF	RU	QF			DNQ
Chris Dobey	RU	QF					SF	QF	SF	QF	W	QF			RU	SF	DNQ
Rob Cross	SF	QF		SF					QF			SF	QF				DNQ
Stephen Bunting	QF								W	QF	RU	QF		SF		QF	DNQ

Legend:	DNQ	Did not qualify	WD	withdrew	QF	Lost in Quarterfinals	SF	Semi-finalist	RU	Runner-up	W	Night winner

== Positions by week ==
Player	Nights															
Player	1	2	3	4	5	6	7	8	9	10	11	12	13	14	15	16
Luke Littler	5	2	4	2		1										
Luke Humphries	1					2										
Nathan Aspinall	8	7	5		3	6				4	3	4	5		4	3
Gerwyn Price	6		2	3	5	3	4		3		4	3				4
Michael van Gerwen	3			4			3		4	5			4		5	
Chris Dobey	2	4	6	7							6	7			6	
Rob Cross	4	5	7	6		5				6	7	6			7	
Stephen Bunting	7	8														

== Incidents ==
Night two of the 2025 Premier League in Glasgow was marred by disruptive crowd behaviour, particularly whistling sounds aimed at Gerwyn Price during his semi-final match with Luke Humphries, as well as at Humphries himself along with opponent Luke Littler during the final. The disruption led to referee Kirk Bevins asking the crowd to stop whistling during his officiating of the latter contest. Price responded to the hecklers by whistling back at them as Humphries jokingly covered his ears. Sky Sports presenter Abigail Davies showed her displeasure with the crowd in a social media post, claiming "There is no way you can be a fan of the sport if you do that." Nightly winner Littler also gave his thoughts, stating that the intervention by Bevins only made the situation worse. He added: "Obviously, they've got to step in at some point and say something. But yeah, that was pretty bad, but I got the win." The PDC issued a statement on the crowd's behaviour the following day, condemning any excessive whistling or booing while players throw and reiterating that they would remove any spectators acting inappropriately.

On night five, Littler addressed media after his second nightly win and spoke about a member of the crowd throwing a pint at Nathan Aspinall moments before the final. He provided further comments surrounding crowd behaviour, stating: "I think we all know some have been good, some have been a bit bad. But that is the darts fans for you, they are either good or they are either bad."

== Broadcasting rights ==
In the United Kingdom and the Republic of Ireland, the tournament was broadcast live on Sky Sports. Viaplay and DAZN also aired the tournament. In the United States, Peacock streamed the play-offs. The PDC's streaming service, PDCTV, is broadcasting the tournament for Rest of the World subscribers.
