= 2014 WDF Europe Cup =

Tournament information
- Dates: 23–27 September
- Venue: Intercontinental Hotel Bucharest
- Location: Bucharest
- Country: Romania
- Organisation(s): WDF
- Format: Legs

Champion(s)
- Singles (Republic of Ireland) David Concannon (men's singles) (Russia) Anastasia Dobromyslova (women's singles); Pairs; Scott Waites & Scott Mitchell (men's pairs) (Germany) Irina Armstrong & Anne Willcomm (women's pairs); Team; Wales (men's team); England (women's team); Overall; England (men's overall); England (women's overall)

The 2014 WDF Europe Cup was the 19th edition of the WDF Europe Cup darts tournament, organised by the World Darts Federation. It was held in Bucharest, Romania from September 23 to 27.

== Medal tally ==
No information about silver and bronze medals in overall men's and women's competition.

* Host nation (Romania)

Rank	Nation	Gold	Silver	Bronze	Total
1	England (ENG)	4	2	4	10
2	Germany (GER)	1	0	1	2
2	Russia (RUS)	1	0	1	2
2	Wales (WAL)	1	0	1	2
5	Ireland (IRL)	1	0	0	1
6	Netherlands (NED)	0	3	0	3
7	Lithuania (LTU)	0	1	0	1
8	Denmark (DEN)	0	0	1	1
8	Finland (FIN)	0	0	1	1
8	Greece (GRE)	0	0	1	1
8	Northern Ireland (NIR)	0	0	1	1
8	Scotland (SCO)	0	0	1	1
Totals (12 entries)		8	6	12	26

== Entered teams ==
33 countries/associations entered a men's selection in the event. 25 countries/associations entered a women's selection in the event.

Nr.	Country	Men's Selection
1	Austria	Felix Losan, Peter Nigitz, Christoph Kleindienst, Hannes Schnier
2	Belgium	Jorgen Aerts, Dennis Piepers, Jeffrey Van Egdom, John Desreumaux
3	Bulgaria	Tsetso Todorov, Ivan Neykov, Nikolai Krustev, Krasimir Ivanov
4	Catalonia	Angel Rodriguez, Carles Arola, Fernando Gavilan, Juan Robles
5	Cyprus	Demetris Georgiou, Wayne Halliwel, John Ross, Alin Patru
6	Czech Republic	Karel Sedláček, Petr Hyncica, Pavel Drtil, Michal Ondo
7	Denmark	Brian Buur, Vladimir Andersen, Mogens Christensen, Ulrich Meyn
8	England	Glen Durrant, Scott Waites, Scott Mitchell, James Wilson
9	Finland	Sami Sanssi, Asko Niskala, Kim Viljanen, Marko Kantele
10	France	Matthieu Leclercq, David Thooris, Renaud Lescure, Michel Boulet
11	Germany	Alexander Reiher, Frank Gansen, Robert Allenstein, Daniel Zygla
12	Greece	Stathis Pantelidis, Kostas Pantelidis, George Portokalis, Antonis Lampropoulos
13	Gibraltar	John Duo, Antony Lopez, Manuel Vilerio, Dylan Duo
14	Iceland	Kristjan Thorsteinsson, Valur Sigurdsson, Gudmundur Fridbjörnsson, Hallgrimur Egilsson
15	Ireland	David Concannon, Benny Grace, Jason Cullen, Sean McGowan
16	Italy	Marco Apollonio, Daniele Sergi, Salvatore Mantarro, Loris Polese
17	Jersey	Stuart Moon, Nathan Le Bailly, Eddie Le Bailly-Jnr, Steve Eusebini
18	Lithuania	Tomas Sakys, Rokas Aniulis, Darius Labanauskas, Arūnas Čiplys
19	Luxembourg	Tom Burquel, Steven Miles, Mingo Claudiano, Roland Weis
20	Netherlands	Remco van Eijden, Jeffrey de Graaf, Danny Noppert, Wesley Harms
21	Northern Ireland	Colin McGarry, Gary Elliot, Barry Copeland, Kevin Burness
22	Norway	Henrik Halsvik, Stig-Jarle Knudsen, Robert Hansen, Vegar Elvevoll
23	Poland	Krzysztof Chmielewski, Krzysztof Stróżyk, Bartosz Wieczorek, Piotr Lega
24	Romania	Adrian Frim, László Kádár, Remus Cotrau, Gabriel Plesca
25	Russia	Boris Koltsov, Nikolai Mikhalin, Roman Obukhov, Aleksei Kadochnikov
26	Scotland	Craig Baxter, Ross Montgomery, Alan Soutar, Steve Ritchie
27	Serbia	Oliver Ferenc, Vladimir Petkovic, Aleksandar Boric, Aleksandar Milovanovic
28	Sweden	Dennis Nilsson, Peter Sajwani, Johan Engström, Daniel Larsson
29	Switzerland	Patrick Rey, Philippe Ruckstuhl, Rocco Fulciniti, Thomas Junghans
30	Turkey	Eser Tekin, Engin Kayaoglu, Utku Karaca, Engin Ceylan
31	Wales	Jonny Clayton, David Smith-Hayes, Wayne Warren, Martin Phillips
32	Isle of Man	Ian Fields, Wayne Harrison, Paul Kelly, Robert Nelson
33	Spain	Stephen-Charles Hatton, Darren Sanderson, Phillip Stockton, Antonio Munoz Ramos

Nr.	Country	Woman's Selection
1	Austria	Ursula Binder, Eva-Maria Thaler, Daniela Piassoni, Katrin Spitzer
2	Belgium	Kathy Geeraerts, Els Verpoorten, Sharon Bracke, Peggy van Ballaert
3	Bulgaria	Anelia Eneva, Cvetelina Bozhilova, Bilyana Marinova, Galina Angelova
4	Czech Republic	Karolina Farna, Lenka Drtilova, Hana Belobradkova, Jana Kanovska
5	Denmark	Hanne Johnson, Janni Larsen, Berit Schouw, Henriette Honore
6	England	Lorraine Winstanley, Trina Gulliver, Lisa Ashton, Deta Hedman
7	Finland	Kirsi Viinikainen, Sari Nikula, Maret Liiri, Kaisu Rekinen
8	France	Carole Frison, Nelly Le Moullec, Dorothee Lemaire, Laure Schweitzer
9	Germany	Anne Willkomm, Michelle Sossong, Irina Armstrong, Heike Ernst
10	Greece	Marietta Chatzh, Giota Sfakioti, Polita Varouxi, Evi Nakka
11	Iceland	Jóhanna Bergsdóttir, Elinborg Bjornsdóttir, Ólafía Gudmundsdóttir, Ingibjörg Magnúsdóttir
12	Ireland	Olive McIntyre, Veronica Skeffington, Catherine Flemming, Caroline Breen
13	Italy	Giada Ciofi, Giovanna Novelli, Samantha Piccolo, Elisa Brunetti
14	Netherlands	Anneke Kuijten, Aileen de Graaf, Tamara Schuur, Sharon Prins
15	Northern Ireland	Jennifer Mullan, Kelly McGivern, Margaret Maguire, Grace Crane
16	Norway	Rachna David, Inita Bite, Elin Aasetrand, Ramona Eriksen
17	Poland	Renata Slowikowska, Joanna Kubowicz, Aleksandra Grzesik, Jolanta Rzepka
18	Romania	Oana-Diana Birsan, Oana Cimpoca, Silvia Nedelcu, Michaela Ivan
19	Russia	Anastasia Dobromyslova, Lidiya Koltsova, Marina Shershukova, Tatiana Volokhina
20	Scotland	Jenny Tully, Louise Hepburn, Kate Smith, Frances Lawson
21	Serbia	Natasa Maksimovic, Djurdina Miskovic, Tamara Milic, Jelena Popov
22	Sweden	Maud Jansson, Anna Forsmark, Deana Rosenblom, Linda Nilsson
23	Switzerland	Katharina Von Rufs, Daniela Buel, Jeannette Stoop, Colette Rudin
24	Turkey	Rabia Uslu, Sennur Yasli, Rabia Dolgun, Gamze Eraslan
25	Wales	Rhian Griffiths, Julie Gore, Elaine Powell, Chris Savvery

== Men's singles ==
1st Round (best of 7 legs)
Ross Montgomery	4
(Gibraltar) John Duo	1
Frank Gansen	4
Steven Miles	2
Brendan Grace	4
Piotr Lega	1
László Kádár	4
Henrik Halsvik	1
Fernando Gavilan	1
Wayne Warren	4
Antonis Lampropoulos	1
Michal Ondo	4
Scott Mitchell	4
Nathan Le Bailly	0
Marco Apollonio	4
Tomas Sakys	1
Michel Boulet	2
Utku Karaca	4
Thomas Junghans	4
Wayne Halliwel	1
Boris Koltsov	4
Jeffey van Egdom	0
Remco van Eijden	4
Peter Nigitz	1
Ulrich Meyn	4
Asko Niskala	2
Kristjan Thorsteinsson	1
Krasimir Ivanov	4
Vladimir Petkovic	0
Kevin Burgess	4
Daniel Larsson
Bye
Colin McGarry
Bye
Renaud Lescure	1
Hannes Schnier	4
Valur Sigurdsson	4
Aleksei Kadochnikov	3
Peter Sajwani	4
Mogens Christensen	3
Pavel Drtil	2
Darius Labanauskas	4
Alan Soutar	3
Daniele Sergi	4
John Ross	0
Sami Sanssi	4
Aleksandar Boric	3
Vegar Elvevoll	4
Rocco Fulciniti	4
Ivan Neykov	3
John Desreumaux	3
Daniel Zygla	4
Carles Arola	4
Eddie Le Bailly-Jnr	1
Tom Burquel	2
Stathis Pantelidis	4
Engin Kayaoglu	4
Gabriel Plesca	0
Scott Waites	0
Jason Cullen	4
Krzysztof Chmielewski	1
Danny Noppert	4
Martin Phillips	4
(Gibraltar) Antony Lopez	0
Marko Kantele	4
(Gibraltar) Manuel Vilerio	0
Philippe Ruckstuhl	3
Oliver Ferenc	4
George Portokalis	3
Nikolai Mikhalin	4
Bartosz Wieczorek	4
Juan Robles	1
Gudmundur Fridbjörnsson	1
Barry Copeland	4
Adrian Frim	4
Craig Baxter	1
Jorgen Aerts	4
Alin Patru	0
Eser Tekin	4
Steve Eusebini	3
Johan Engström	4
Matthieu Leclercq	2
David Concannon	4
Felix Losan	1
James Wilson	4
Salvatore Mantarro	0
Jonny Clayton	4
Tsetso Todorov	0
Vladimir Andersen	1
Robert Allenstein	4
Jeffrey de Graaf	4
Karel Sedláček	1
Rokas Aniulis	4
Roland Weis	3
Robert Hansen	4
(Gibraltar) Dylan Duo	0
Glen Durrant
Bye
Brian Buur	4
Mingo Claudiano	2
Kim Viljanen	4
Steve Ritchie	1
Arūnas Čiplys	0
Stig-Jarle Knudsen	4
Kostas Pantelidis	4
Aleksandar Milovanovic	3
Alexander Reiher	4
Angel Rodriguez	0
Dennis Nilsson	4
Christoph Kleindienst	1
Sean McGowan	4
Stuart Moon	0
David Thooris	3
Krzysztof Stróżyk	4
Dennis Piepers	1
David Smith-Hayes	4
Remus Cotrau	0
Roman Obukhov	4
Patrick Rey	4
Hallgrimur Egilsson	2
Petr Hyncica	3
Loris Polese	4
Gary Elliot	3
Demetris Georgiou	4
Engin Ceylan	1
Nikolai Krustev	4
Wesley Harms
Bye

2nd Round (best of 7 legs)
Ross Montgomery	4
Frank Gansen	2
Brendan Grace	1
László Kádár	4
Wayne Warren	3
Michal Ondo	4
Scott Mitchell	4
Marco Apollonio	0
Utku Karaca	0
Thomas Junghans	4
Boris Koltsov	4
Remco van Eijden	1
Ulrich Meyn	4
Krasimir Ivanov	3
Kevin Burgess	2
Daniel Larsson	4
Colin McGarry	3
Hannes Schnier	4
Valur Sigurdsson	0
Peter Sajwani	4
Darius Labanauskas	4
Daniele Sergi	0
Sami Sanssi	3
Vegar Elvevoll	4
Rocco Fulciniti	3
Daniel Zygla	4
Carles Arola	4
Stathis Pantelidis	1
Engin Kayaoglu	1
Jason Cullen	4
Danny Noppert	4
Martin Phillips	3
Marko Kantele	1
Oliver Ferenc	4
Nikolai Mikhalin	4
Bartosz Wieczorek	1
Barry Copeland	4
Adrian Frim	1
Jorgen Aerts	4
Eser Tekin	1
Johan Engström	3
David Concannon	4
James Wilson	4
Jonny Clayton	0
Robert Allenstein	4
Jeffrey de Graaf	3
Rokas Aniulis	2
Robert Hansen	4
Glen Durrant	4
Brian Buur	1
Kim Viljanen	4
Stig-Jarle Knudsen	0
Kostas Pantelidis	4
Alexander Reiher	1
Dennis Nilsson	1
Sean McGowan	4
Krzysztof Stróżyk	3
David Smith-Hayes	4
Roman Obukhov	3
Patrick Rey	4
Loris Polese	0
Demetris Georgiou	4
Nikolai Krustev	2
Wesley Harms	4

3rd Round (best of 7 legs)
Ross Montgomery	4
László Kádár	0
Michal Ondo	4
Scott Mitchell	1
Thomas Junghans	0
Boris Koltsov	4
Ulrich Meyn	1
Daniel Larsson	4
Hannes Schnier	2
Peter Sajwani	4
Darius Labanauskas	4
Vegar Elvevoll	0
Daniel Zygla	4
Carles Arola	1
Jason Cullen	4
Danny Noppert	0
Oliver Ferenc	4
Nikolai Mikhalin	2
Barry Copeland	3
Jorgen Aerts	4
David Concannon	4
James Wilson	0
Robert Allenstein	4
Robert Hansen	2
Glen Durrant	4
Kim Viljanen	0
Kostas Pantelidis	1
Sean McGowan	4
David Smith-Hayes	4
Patrick Rey	2
Demetris Georgiou	1
Wesley Harms	4

4th Round (best of 7 legs)
Ross Montgomery	4
Michal Ondo	2
Boris Koltsov	4
Daniel Larsson	2
Peter Sajwani	0
Darius Labanauskas	4
Daniel Zygla	2
Jason Cullen	4
Oliver Ferenc	3
Jorgen Aerts	4
David Concannon	4
Robert Allenstein	0
Glen Durrant	4
Sean McGowan	2
David Smith-Hayes	4
Wesley Harms	2

Quarter-finals (best of 9 legs)
Ross Montgomery 87.48	4
Boris Koltsov 79.98	5
Darius Labanauskas 94.32	5
Jason Cullen 83.40	1
Jorgen Aerts 82.17	3
David Concannon 90.03	5
Glen Durrant 87.03	2
David Smith-Hayes 90.66	5

Semi-finals (best of 11 legs)
Boris Koltsov 84.00	3
Darius Labanauskas 86.82	6
Final (best of 13 legs)
Darius Labanauskas 88.56	5
David Concannon 93.15	7
David Concannon 89.01	6
David Smith-Hayes 81.36	1

== Men's Pairs ==
1st Round (best of 7 legs)
Jeffrey de Graaf; Wesley Harms	4
(Gibraltar) John Duo (Gibraltar) Dylan Duo	0
Nathan Le Bailly; Eddie Le Bailly-Jnr	1
Robert Allenstein; Daniel Zygla	4
Vladimir Petkovic; Aleksandar Boric	4
Alin Patru; John Ross	2
Dennis Nilsson; Peter Sajwani	4
Loris Polese; Salvatore Mantarro	2
Craig Baxter; Steve Ritchie	4
Petr Hyncica; Michal Ondo	1
Gary Elliot; Kevin Burness	4
Rokas Aniulis; Tomas Sakys	1
Tsetso Todorov; Krasimir Ivanov	4
Angel Rodriguez; Fernando Gavilan	3
George Portokalis; Kostas Pantelidis	4
Eser Tekin; Engin Kayaoglu	2
Scott Mitchell; Scott Waites	4
Krzysztof Chmielewski; Krzysztof Stróżyk	2
Henrik Halsvik; Stig-Jarle Knudsen	4
David Thooris; Renaud Lescure	0
Philippe Ruckstuhl; Rocco Fulciniti	4
Tom Burquel; Roland Weis	3
Jonny Clayton; David Smith-Hayes	3
Brendan Grace; David Concannon	4
Dennis Piepers; Jorgen Aerts	4
Valur Sigurdsson; Hallgrimur Egilsson	2
Peter Nigitz; Christoph Kleindienst	1
Adrian Frim; László Kádár	4
Mogens Christensen; Ulrich Meyn	4
Nikolai Mikhalin; Roman Obukhov	3
Kim Viljanen; Marko Kantele
Bye
Darius Labanauskas; Arūnas Čiplys	4
(Gibraltar) Antony Lopez (Gibraltar) Manuel Vilerio	1
Jason Cullen; Sean McGowan	4
Hannes Schnier; Felix Losan	1
Gudmundur Fridbjörnsson; Kristjan Thorsteinsson	2
Brian Buur; Vladimir Andersen	4
Demetris Georgiou; Wayne Halliwel	4
Piotr Lega; Bartosz Wieczorek	2
Matthieu Leclercq; Michel Boulet	0
Alan Soutar; Ross Montgomery	4
Robert Hansen; Vegar Elvevoll	4
Steve Eusebini; Stuart Moon	0
Remus Cotrau; Gabriel Plesca	2
Aleksandar Milovanovic; Oliver Ferenc	4
Danny Noppert; Remco van Eijden	3
Wayne Warren; Martin Phillips	4
Colin McGarry; Barry Copeland	4
Mingo Claudiano; Steven Miles	3
Stathis Pantelidis; Antonis Lampropoulos	1
Patrick Rey; Thomas Junghans	4
Karel Sedláček; Pavel Drtil	4
Engin Ceylan; Utku Karaca	2
Sami Sanssi; Asko Niskala	4
Carles Arola; Juan Robles	2
Ivan Neykov; Nikolai Krustev	1
Alexander Reiher; Frank Gansen	4
Daniel Larsson; Johan Engström	2
James Wilson; Glen Durrant	4
Boris Koltsov; Aleksei Kadochnikov	3
Daniele Sergi; Marco Apollonio	4
John Desreumaux; Jeffey van Egdom
Bye

2nd Round (best of 7 legs)
Jeffrey de Graaf; Wesley Harms	4
Robert Allenstein; Daniel Zygla	2
Vladimir Petkovic; Aleksandar Boric	0
Dennis Nilsson; Peter Sajwani	4
Craig Baxter; Steve Ritchie	1
Gary Elliot; Kevin Burness	4
Tsetso Todorov; Krasimir Ivanov	2
George Portokalis; Kostas Pantelidis	4
Scott Mitchell; Scott Waites	4
Henrik Halsvik; Stig-Jarle Knudsen	3
Philippe Ruckstuhl; Rocco Fulciniti	1
Brendan Grace; David Concannon	4
Dennis Piepers; Jorgen Aerts	3
Adrian Frim; László Kádár	4
Mogens Christensen; Ulrich Meyn	2
Kim Viljanen; Marko Kantele	4
Darius Labanauskas; Arūnas Čiplys	3
Jason Cullen; Sean McGowan	4
Brian Buur; Vladimir Andersen	4
Demetris Georgiou; Wayne Halliwel	0
Alan Soutar; Ross Montgomery	4
Robert Hansen; Vegar Elvevoll	0
Aleksandar Milovanovic; Oliver Ferenc	1
Wayne Warren; Martin Phillips	4
Colin McGarry; Barry Copeland	4
Patrick Rey; Thomas Junghans	2
Karel Sedláček; Pavel Drtil	1
Sami Sanssi; Asko Niskala	4
Alexander Reiher; Frank Gansen	1
James Wilson; Glen Durrant	4
Daniele Sergi; Marco Apollonio	3
John Desreumaux; Jeffey van Egdom	4

3rd Round (best of 7 legs)
Jeffrey de Graaf; Wesley Harms	4
Dennis Nilsson; Peter Sajwani	1
Gary Elliot; Kevin Burgess	2
George Portokalis; Kostas Pantelidis	4
Scott Mitchell; Scott Waites	4
Brendan Grace; David Concannon	3
Adrian Frim; László Kádár	1
Kim Viljanen; Marko Kantele	4
Jason Cullen; Sean McGowan	1
Brian Buur; Vladimir Andersen	4
Alan Soutar; Ross Montgomery	4
Wayne Warren; Martin Phillips	2
Colin McGarry; Barry Copeland	4
Sami Sanssi; Asko Niskala	1
James Wilson; Glen Durrant	4
John Desreumaux; Jeffey van Egdom	0

Quarter-finals (best of 7 legs)
Jeffrey de Graaf; Wesley Harms	3
George Portokalis; Kostas Pantelidis	4
Scott Mitchell; Scott Waites	4
Kim Viljanen; Marko Kantele	1
Brian Buur; Vladimir Andersen	1
Alan Soutar; Ross Montgomery	4
Colin McGarry; Barry Copeland	3
James Wilson; Glen Durrant	4

Semi-finals (best of 9 legs)
George Portokalis; Kostas Pantelidis	0
Scott Mitchell; Scott Waites	5
Craig Baxter; Steve Ritchie	3
James Wilson; Glen Durrant	5

Final (best of 11 legs)
Scott Mitchell; Scott Waites	6
James Wilson; Glen Durrant	5

== Men's team ==
Round Robin

Group A

Pos	Team	Pld	Win	Lose	LF	LA	+/-
1	Netherlands	2	1	1	16	12	+4
2	Germany	2	1	1	16	16	0
3	Serbia	2	1	1	12	16	-4

- Netherlands 9 - 3 Serbia
- Germany 9 - 7 Netherlands
- Serbia 9 - 7 Germany

Group B

Pos	Team	Pld	Win	Lose	LF	LA	+/-
1	Finland	3	3	0	27	2	+25
2	Poland	3	2	1	18	18	0
3	Russia	3	1	2	18	20	-2
4	Catalonia	3	0	3	4	27	-23

- Finland 9 - 0 Poland
- Finland 9 - 2 Russia
- Finland 9 - 2 Catalonia
- Poland 9 - 7 Russia
- Poland 9 - 2 Catalonia
- Russia 9 - 2 Catalonia

Group C

Pos	Team	Pld	Win	Lose	LF	LA	+/-
1	Scotland	3	3	0	27	12	+15
2	Czech Republic	3	2	1	25	20	+5
3	France	3	1	2	17	26	-9
4	Romania	3	0	3	16	27	-11

- Scotland 9 - 3 Czech Republic
- Scotland 9 - 7 France
- Scotland 9 - 2 Romania
- Czech Republic 9 - 5 France
- Czech Republic 9 - 6 Romania
- France 9 - 8 Romania

Group D

Pos	Team	Pld	Win	Lose	LF	LA	+/-
1	Wales	3	3	0	27	12	+15
2	Norway	3	2	1	24	18	+6
3	Bulgaria	3	1	2	18	26	-8
4	Jersey	3	0	3	14	27	-13

- Wales 9 - 6 Norway
- Wales 9 - 4 Bulgaria
- Wales 9 - 2 Jersey
- Norway 9 - 5 Bulgaria
- Norway 9 - 4 Jersey
- Bulgaria 9 - 8 Jersey

Group E

Pos	Team	Pld	Win	Lose	LF	LA	+/-
1	Greece	3	3	0	27	18	+9
2	Belgium	3	2	1	24	19	+5
3	Switzerland	3	1	2	22	23	-1
4	Cyprus	3	0	3	14	27	-13

- Greece 9 - 6 Belgium
- Greece 9 - 6 Switzerland
- Greece 9 - 6 Cyprus
- Belgium 9 - 7 Switzerland
- Belgium 9 - 3 Cyprus
- Switzerland 9 - 5 Cyprus

Group F

Pos	Team	Pld	Win	Lose	LF	LA	+/-
1	Northern Ireland	3	3	0	27	12	+15
2	Turkey	3	2	1	26	20	+6
3	Italy	3	1	2	17	23	-6
4	Lithuania	3	0	3	12	27	-15

- Northern Ireland 9 - 8 Turkey
- Northern Ireland 9 - 2 Italy
- Northern Ireland 9 - 2 Lithuania
- Turkey 9 - 6 Italy
- Turkey 9 - 5 Lithuania
- Italy 9 - 5 Lithuania

Group G

Pos	Team	Pld	Win	Lose	LF	LA	+/-
1	Denmark	3	2	1	26	18	+8
2	Sweden	3	2	1	24	16	+8
3	Ireland	3	2	1	24	18	+6
4	Iceland	3	0	3	5	27	-22

- Denmark 9 - 6 Sweden
- Denmark 9 - 3 Iceland
- Sweden 9 - 6 Ireland
- Sweden 9 - 1 Iceland
- Ireland 9 - 8 Denmark
- Ireland 9 - 1 Iceland

Group H

Pos	Team	Pld	Win	Lose	LF	LA	+/-
1	England	2	2	0	18	3	+15
2	Luxembourg	2	1	1	10	14	-4
3	Austria	2	0	2	7	18	-11

- England 9 - 1 Luxembourg
- England 9 - 2 Austria
- Luxembourg 9 - 5 Austria

Knock Out

Last 16 (best of 17 legs)
A1	Netherlands	9
G2	Sweden	8
B1	Finland	9
H2	Luxembourg	0
C1	Scotland	9
E2	Belgium	5
D1	Wales	9
F2	Turkey	6
E1	Greece	9
C2	Czech Republic	5
F1	Northern Ireland	9
D2	Norway	7
G1	Denmark	4
A2	Germany	9
H1	England	9
B2	Poland	2

Quarter-finals (best of 17 legs)
A1	Netherlands	9
B1	Finland	6
C1	Scotland	3
D1	Wales	9
E1	Greece	3
F1	Northern Ireland	9
A2	Germany	5
H1	England	9

Semi-finals (best of 17 legs)
A1	Netherlands	4
D1	Wales	9
F1	Northern Ireland	5
H1	England	9

Final (best of 17 legs)
D1	Wales	9
H1	England	7

== Women's singles ==
1st Round (best of 7 legs)
Peggy van Ballaert
Bye
Aleksandra Grzesik	1
Colette Rudin	4
Daniela Piassoni	1
Sharon Prins	4
Evi Nakka	4
Sari Nikula	1
Berit Schouw
Bye
Deta Hedman	4
Veronica Skeffington	0
Nelly Le Moullec	1
Sennur Yasli	4
Frances Lawson
Bye
Jelena Popov
Bye
Chris Savvery	4
Ingibjörg Magnúsdóttir	0
Elisa Brunetti	4
Cvetelina Bozhilova	1
Ramona Eriksen
Bye
Silvia Nedelcu
Bye
Grace Crane	4
Tatiana Volokhina	3
Anne Willkomm	4
Deana Rosenblom	2
Lenka Drtilova
Bye
Julie Gore
Bye
Gamze Eraslan	1
Linda Nilsson	4
Giota Sfakioti	1
Caroline Breen	4
Aileen de Graaf	4
Natasa Maksimovic	0
Giada Ciofi
Bye
Lidiya Koltsova	4
Jóhanna Bergsdóttir	0
Michelle Sossong	4
Hana Belobradkova	2
Lorraine Winstanley
Bye
Carole Frison
Bye
Oana-Diana Birsan	4
Sharon Bracke	2
Kate Smith	4
Maret Liiri	3
Anelia Eneva
Bye
Eva-Maria Thaler
Bye
Elin Aasetrand	4
Renata Slowikowska	1
Kelly McGivern	1
Hanne Johnson	4
Katharina von Rufs
Bye
Louise Hepburn
Bye
Heike Ernst	4
Bilyana Marinova	0
Michaela Ivan	2
Marietta Chatzh	4
Rachna David	1
Trina Gulliver	4
Maud Jansson
Bye
Elinborg Bjornsdottir	3
Joanna Kubowicz	4
Elaine Powell	4
Samantha Piccolo	2
Anneke Kuijten
Bye
Rabia Dolgun
Bye
Dorothee Lemaire	0
Janni Larsen	4
Tamara Milic	0
Anastasia Dobromyslova	4
Jennifer Mullan
Bye
Catherine Flemming
Bye
Ursula Binder	1
Els Verpoorten	4
Jeannette Stoop	4
Jana Kanovska	3
Kirsi Viinikainen
Bye
Jolanta Rzepka
Bye	4
Oana Cimpoca	4
Margaret Maguire	1
Djurdina Miskovic	0
Anna Forsmark	4
Laure Schweitzer	2
Olive McIntyre	4
Olavia Gudmundsdottir
Bye
Karolina Farna	2
Inita Bite	4
Katrin Spitzer	4
Daniela Buel	2
Polita Varouxi
Bye
Kathy Geeraerts
Bye
Kaisu Rekinen	3
Tamara Schuur	4
Giovanna Novelli	0
Jenni Tully	4
Marina Shershukova
Bye
Irina Armstrong
Bye
Galina Angelova	3
Rabia Uslu	4
Henriette Honore	2
Rhian Griffiths	4
Lisa Ashton
Bye

2nd Round (best of 7 legs)
Peggy Van Ballaert	0
Colette Rudin	4
Sharon Prins	4
Evi Nakka	0
Berit Schouw	0
Deta Hedman	4
Sennur Yasli	0
Frances Lawson	4
Jelena Popov	1
Chris Savvery	4
Elisa Brunetti	1
Ramona Eriksen	4
Silvia Nedelcu	0
Grace Crane	4
Anne Willkomm	4
Lenka Drtilova	1
Julie Gore	4
Linda Nilsson	3
Caroline Breen	0
Aileen de Graaf	4
Giada Ciofi	4
Lidiya Koltsova	0
Michelle Sossong	0
Lorraine Winstanley	4
Carole Frison	4
Oana-Diana Birsan	3
Kate Smith	4
Anelia Eneva	2
Eva-Maria Thaler	1
Elin Aasetrand	4
Hanne Johnson	2
Katharina Von Rufs	4
Louise Hepburn	4
Heike Ernst	3
Marietta Chatzh	0
Trina Gulliver	4
Maud Jansson	4
Joanna Kubowicz	1
Elaine Powell	2
Anneke Kuijten	4
Rabia Dolgun	4
Janni Larsen	1
Anastasia Dobromyslova	4
Jennifer Mullan	0
Catherine Flemming	2
Els Verpoorten	4
Jeannette Stoop	1
Kirsi Viinikainen	4
Jolanta Rzepka	4
Oana Cimpoca	3
Anna Forsmark	3
Olive McIntyre	4
Olavia Gudmundsdottir	1
Inita Bite	4
Katrin Spitzer	4
Polita Varouxi	1
Kathy Geeraerts	1
Tamara Schuur	4
Jenni Tully	1
Marina Shershukova	4
Irina Armstrong	4
Rabia Uslu	0
Rhian Griffiths	4
Lisa Ashton	3

3rd Round (best of 7 legs)
Colette Rudin	1
Sharon Prins	4
Deta Hedman	4
Frances Lawson	0
Chris Savvery	3
Ramona Eriksen	4
Grace Crane	3
Anne Willkomm	4
Julie Gore	1
Aileen de Graaf	4
Giada Ciofi	0
Lorraine Winstanley	4
Carole Frison	4
Kate Smith	3
Elin Aasetrand	4
Katharina Von Rufs	2
Louise Hepburn	4
Trina Gulliver	2
Maud Jansson	4
Anneke Kuijten	1
Rabia Dolgun	0
Anastasia Dobromyslova	4
Els Verpoorten	0
Kirsi Viinikainen	4
Jolanta Rzepka	4
Olive McIntyre	3
Inita Bite	3
Katrin Spitzer	4
Tamara Schuur	4
Marina Shershukova	0
Irina Armstrong	4
Rhian Griffiths	0

4th Round (best of 7 legs)
Sharon Prins	1
Deta Hedman	4
Ramona Eriksen	4
Anne Willkomm	2
Aileen de Graaf	3
Lorraine Winstanley	4
Carole Frison	4
Elin Aasetrand	0
Louise Hepburn	2
Maud Jansson	4
Anastasia Dobromyslova	4
Kirsi Viinikainen	1
Jolanta Rzepka	4
Katrin Spitzer	1
Tamara Schuur	2
Irina Armstrong	4

Quarter-finals (best of 9 legs)
Deta Hedman 77.58	5
Ramona Eriksen 63.96	0
Lorraine Winstanley 78.63	5
Carole Frison 64.08	0
Maud Jansson 49.95	0
Anastasia Dobromyslova 73.44	5
Jolanta Rzepka 60.54	2
Irina Armstrong 57.45	5

Semi-finals (best of 11 legs)
Deta Hedman 73.68	6
Lorraine Winstanley 74.40	4
Final (best of 13 legs)
Deta Hedman 83.34	5
Anastasia Dobromyslova 80.46	7
Anastasia Dobromyslova 65.34	6
Irina Armstrong 70.53	5

== Woman's Pairs ==
1st Round (best of 7 legs)
Aileen de Graaf; Anneke Kuijten
Bye
Eva-Maria Thaler; Ursula Binder	4
Joanna Kubowicz; Renata Slowikowska	1
Julie Gore; Rhian Griffiths	4
Bilyana Marinova; Anelia Eneva	2
Michelle Sossong; Heike Ernst	4
Giada Ciofi; Samantha Piccolo	0
Oana-Diana Birsan; Silvia Nedelcu
Bye
Marietta Chatzh; Polita Varouxi	4
Olavia Gudmundsdottir; Jóhanna Bergsdóttir	1
Sharon Bracke; Els Verpoorten	4
Kaisu Rekinen; Maret Liiri	3
Maud Jansson; Anna Forsmark
Bye
Rachna David; Inita Bite
Bye
Hana Belobradkova; Jana Kanovska	0
Lorraine Winstanley; Deta Hedman	4
Margaret Maguire; Kelly McGivern	1
Gamze Eraslan; Rabia Dolgun	4
Marina Shershukova; Anastasia Dobromyslova
Bye
Daniela Buel; Katharina Von Rufs
Bye
Hanne Johnson; Janni Larsen	4
Catherine Flemming; Veronica Skeffington	1
Dorothee Lemaire; Carole Frison	4
Tamara Milic; Djurdina Miskovic	0
Frances Lawson; Louise Hepburn
Bye
Trina Gulliver; Lisa Ashton
Bye
Henriette Honore; Berit Schouw	4
Nelly Le Moullec; Laure Schweitzer	1
Elinborg Bjornsdottir; Ingibjörg Magnúsdóttir	1
Lidiya Koltsova; Tatiana Volokhina	4
Ramona Eriksen; Elin Aasetrand	2
Linda Nilsson; Deana Rosenblom	4
Daniela Piassoni; Katrin Spitzer
Bye
Kate Smith; Jenny Tully	4
Lenka Drtilova; Karolina Farna	2
Cvetelina Bozhilova; Galina Angelova	2
Giota Sfakioti; Evi Nakka	4
Jennifer Mullan; Grace Crane
Bye
Caroline Breen; Olive McIntyre
Bye
Michaela Ivan; Oana Cimpoca	0
Tamara Schuur; Sharon Prins	4
Natasa Maksimovic; Jelena Popov	1
Anne Willkomm; Irina Armstrong	4
Kathy Geeraerts; Peggy van Ballaert
Bye
Sennur Yasli; Rabia Uslu
Bye
Jolanta Rzepka; Aleksandra Grzesik	2
Giovanna Novelli; Elisa Brunetti	4
Kirsi Viinikainen; Sari Nikula
Bye
Chris Savvery; Elaine Powell
Bye

2nd Round (best of 7 legs)
Aileen de Graaf; Anneke Kuijten	4
Eva-Maria Thaler; Ursula Binder	0
Julie Gore; Rhian Griffiths	4
Michelle Sossong; Heike Ernst	0
Oana-Diana Birsan; Silvia Nedelcu	3
Marietta Chatzh; Polita Varouxi	4
Sharon Bracke; Els Verpoorten	1
Maud Jansson; Anna Forsmark	4
Rachna David; Inita Bite	0
Lorraine Winstanley; Deta Hedman	4
Gamze Eraslan; Rabia Dolgun	1
Marina Shershukova; Anastasia Dobromyslova	4
Daniela Buel; Katharina Von Rufs	2
Hanne Johnson; Janni Larsen	4
Dorothee Lemaire; Carole Frison	4
Frances Lawson; Louise Hepburn	3
Trina Gulliver; Lisa Ashton	4
Henriette Honore; Berit Schouw	0
Lidiya Koltsova; Tatiana Volokhina	3
Linda Nilsson; Deana Rosenblom	4
Daniela Piassoni; Katrin Spitzer	2
Kate Smith; Jenny Tully	4
Giota Sfakioti; Evi Nakka	0
Jennifer Mullan; Grace Crane	4
Caroline Breen; Olive McIntyre	4
Tamara Schuur; Sharon Prins	3
Anne Willkomm; Irina Armstrong	4
Kathy Geeraerts; Peggy van Ballaert	0
Sennur Yasli; Rabia Uslu	4
Giovanna Novelli; Elisa Brunetti	1
Kirsi Viinikainen; Sari Nikula	2
Chris Savvery; Elaine Powell	4

3rd Round (best of 7 legs)
Aileen de Graaf; Anneke Kuijten	4
Julie Gore; Rhian Griffiths	2
Marietta Chatzh; Polita Varouxi	1
Maud Jansson; Anna Forsmark	4
Lorraine Winstanley; Deta Hedman	4
Marina Shershukova; Anastasia Dobromyslova	2
Hanne Johnson; Janni Larsen	4
Dorothee Lemaire; Carole Frison	1
Trina Gulliver; Lisa Ashton	4
Linda Nilsson; Deana Rosenblom	1
Kate Smith; Jenny Tully	1
Jennifer Mullan; Grace Crane	4
Caroline Breen; Olive McIntyre	1
Anne Willkomm; Irina Armstrong	4
Sennur Yasli; Rabia Uslu	0
Chris Savvery; Elaine Powell	4

Quarter-finals (best of 7 legs)
Aileen de Graaf; Anneke Kuijten	4
Maud Jansson; Anna Forsmark	0
Lorraine Winstanley; Deta Hedman	4
Hanne Johnson; Janni Larsen	0
Trina Gulliver; Lisa Ashton	4
Jennifer Mullan; Grace Crane	0
Anne Willkomm; Irina Armstrong	4
Chris Savvery; Elaine Powell	1

Semi-finals (best of 9 legs)
Aileen de Graaf; Anneke Kuijten	5
Lorraine Winstanley; Deta Hedman	3
Trina Gulliver; Lisa Ashton	3
Anne Willkomm; Irina Armstrong	5

Final (best of 11 legs)
Aileen de Graaf; Anneke Kuijten	5
Anne Willkomm; Irina Armstrong	6

== Woman's Team ==
Round Robin

Group A

Pos	Team	Pld	Win	Lose	LF	LA	+/-
1	Netherlands	2	2	0	18	3	+15
2	Turkey	2	1	1	11	12	-1
3	Austria	2	0	2	4	18	-14

- Netherlands 9 - 2 Turkey
- Netherlands 9 - 1 Austria
- Turkey 9 - 3 Austria

Group B

Pos	Team	Pld	Win	Lose	LF	LA	+/-
1	Sweden	3	2	1	26	20	+10
2	Russia	3	2	1	23	25	-2
3	Norway	3	1	2	21	21	0
4	France	3	1	2	15	23	-8

- Sweden 9 - 4 Norway
- Sweden 9 - 3 France
- Russia 9 - 8 Sweden
- Russia 9 - 8 Norway
- Norway 9 - 3 France
- France 9 - 5 Russia

Group C

Pos	Team	Pld	Win	Lose	LF	LA	+/-
1	Wales	2	2	0	18	5	-13
2	Italy	2	1	1	12	11	+1
3	Bulgaria	2	0	2	4	18	-14

- Wales 9 - 3 Italy
- Wales 9 - 2 Bulgaria
- Italy 9 - 2 Bulgaria

Group D

Pos	Team	Pld	Win	Lose	LF	LA	+/-
1	Scotland	2	2	0	18	3	+15
2	Serbia	2	1	1	11	16	-5
3	Romania	2	0	2	8	18	-10

- Scotland 9 - 2 Serbia
- Scotland 9 - 1 Romania
- Serbia 9 - 7 Romania

Group E

Pos	Team	Pld	Win	Lose	LF	LA	+/-
1	Finland	2	2	0	18	13	+5
2	Denmark	2	1	1	17	15	+2
3	Belgium	2	0	2	11	18	-7

- Finland 9 - 8 Denmark
- Finland 9 - 5 Belgium
- Denmark 9 - 6 Belgium

Group F

Pos	Team	Pld	Win	Lose	LF	LA	+/-
1	Germany	2	2	0	18	8	+10
2	Ireland	2	1	1	13	13	0
3	Switzerland	2	0	2	8	18	-10

- Germany 9 - 4 Ireland
- Germany 9 - 4 Switzerland
- Ireland 9 - 4 Switzerland

Group G

Pos	Team	Pld	Win	Lose	LF	LA	+/-
1	Czech Republic	2	2	0	18	5	+13
2	Northern Ireland	2	1	1	12	12	0
3	Iceland	2	0	2	5	18	-13

- Czech Republic 9 - 3 Northern Ireland
- Czech Republic 9 - 3 Iceland
- Northern Ireland 9 - 3 Iceland

Group H

Pos	Team	Pld	Win	Lose	LF	LA	+/-
1	England	2	2	0	18	0	+18
2	Poland	2	1	1	9	16	-7
3	Greece	2	0	2	7	18	-11

- England 9 - 0 Poland
- England 9 - 0 Greece
- Poland 9 - 7 Greece

Knock Out

Last 16 (best of 17 legs)
A1	Netherlands	9
G2	Northern Ireland	4
B1	Sweden	9
H2	Poland	4
C1	Wales	7
E2	Denmark	9
D1	Scotland	6
F2	Ireland	9
E1	Finland	9
C2	Italy	6
F1	Germany	9
D2	Serbia	1
G1	Czech Republic	9
A2	Turkey	1
H1	England	9
B2	Russia	4

Quarter-finals (best of 17 legs)
A1	Netherlands	9
B1	Sweden	5
E2	Denmark	9
F2	Ireland	8
E1	Finland	9
F1	Germany	8
G1	Czech Republic	2
H1	England	9

Semi-finals (best of 17 legs)
A1	Netherlands	9
E2	Denmark	3
E1	Finland	0
H1	England	9

Final (best of 17 legs)
A1	Netherlands	3
H1	England	9
