= 2010 WDF Europe Cup =

Tournament information
- Venue: Grand Haber Hotel
- Location: Kemer
- Country: Turkey
- Established: 13–17 October
- Organisation(s): WDF
- Format: Legs

Champion(s)
- Singles; Martin Phillips (men's singles) (Netherlands) Francis Hoenselaar (women's singles); Pairs; Martin Adams & Scott Waites (men's pairs) (Wales) Rhian Edwards & Julie Gore (women's pairs); Team; Belgium (men's team); Overall; England (men's overall); Wales (women's overall)

The 2010 WDF Europe Cup was the 17th edition of the WDF Europe Cup darts tournament, organised by the World Darts Federation. It was held in Kemer, Turkey from 13–17 October 2010.

== Entered team ==
29 countries/associations entered a men's selection in the event.

27 countries/associations entered a women's selection in the event.

Nr.	Country	Men's Selection
1	Austria	Franz Thaler, Alireza Ghafouri, Rene Jorgensen, Christoph Kleindienst
2	Belgium	Kurt van de Rijck, Geert De Vos, Ronny Huybrechts, Kim Huybrechts
3	Czech Republic	Jiri Jenicek, Michal Ondo, Miroslav Slusarcik, David Miklas
4	Denmark	Vladimir Andersen, Frede Johansen, Glenn Honore, Stig Jorgensen
5	England	Martin Adams, Darryl Fitton, Tony O'Shea, Scott Waites
6	Estonia	Kaido Poldma, Mati Leis, Kristo Mannik, Tarmo Putsepp
7	Finland	Vesa Nuutinen, Jaakko Kiiski, Petri Korte, Ulf Ceder
8	France	Cyril Blot, Michel Boulet, Christian Demazure, Renaud Lescure
9	Germany	Marko Puls, Colin Rice, Kevin Münch, Swen Seifert
10	Greece	Kyriakos Anastasiadis, Stathis Pantelidis, Kostas Pantelidis, Emmanouil Vichos
11	Gibraltar	Darren Olivero, Dylan Duo, John Duo, George Federico
12	Iceland	Einar Moller, Ivar Jonsson, Aegir Bjornsson, Fridrik Diego
13	Ireland	Stephen McDonnell, Paddy Meaney, Martin McCloskey, Sean McGowan
14	Italy	Claudio Dolcetti, Luigi Marino, Danilo Vigato, Loris Polese
15	Latvia	Richards Tomasickis, Imants Nikolajevs, Guntars Grebskis, Janis Armanovics
16	Lithuania	Arūnas Čiplys, Osvaldas Ksanys, Leonidas Smirinenka, Tomas Sakys
17	Netherlands	Cor Ernst, Rick Hofstra, Joey ten Berge, Willy van de Wiel
18	Northern Ireland	John Elder, Michael Mansell, Gary Elliot, Barry Copeland
19	Norway	Vegar Elvevoll, Øyvind Aasland, Robert Wagner, Thor-Helmer Johansen
20	Poland	Patryk Zabka, Marcin Koziarek, Krzysztof Galus, Marek Kubowicz
21	Romania	Daniel Racoveanu, Claudius-Bert Kuvi, László Kádár, Vlad-Christian Popa
22	Scotland	Ewan Hyslop, John Henderson, Ross Montgomery, Mike Veitch
23	Serbia	Branko Grba, Radivoj Bezbradica, Vladimir Pavkovic, Oliver Ferenc
24	Slovenia	Joze Vautar, Mitja Habijan, Leopold Slanic, Bac Ales
25	Spain	Francisco Gonzalez, Rafael Higuera, Antonio Jimenez, Casiano Paniagua
26	Sweden	Orjan Thomsson, Daniel Larsson, Magnus Caris, Dennis Nilsson
27	Switzerland	Urs Von Rufs, Pascal Barbezat, Thomas Bremgartner, Roman Bleistein
28	Turkey	Eser Tekin, Engin Kayaoglu, Utku Karaca, Emre Toros
29	Wales	Stephen Cake, Robert Hughes, Wayne Warren, Martin Phillips

Nr.	Country	Women's Selection
1	Austria	Daniela Piassoni & Ursula Binder
2	Belgium	Inge Van Genechten & Brigitte Smets
3	Czech Republic	Radana Jandova & Marcela Melicharova
4	Denmark	Mette Funch & Christina Buchwald
5	England	Trina Gulliver & Lisa Ashton
6	Finland	Tarja Salminen & Kirsi Viinikainen
7	France	Dorothee Lemaire & Carole Frison
8	Germany	Heike Ernst & Stefanie Lück
9	Greece	Giota Sfakioti & Maria Prompona
10	Iceland	Sigridur-Gudrun Jonsdottir & Petrea Fridriksdottir
11	Ireland	Caroline Breen & Angela De Ward
12	Italy	Veleda Gaiga & Romanan Petrini
13	Latvia	Ligita Vilks & Vita Grebska
14	Lithuania	Erika Bagdonaviciene & Ryte Banatiene
15	Netherlands	Karin Krappen & Francis Hoenselaar
16	Northern Ireland	Nicole Dillon & Denise Cassidy
17	Norway	Veronica Simonsen & Marianne Halvorsen
18	Poland	Ewa Zabka & Malgorzara Storczyk
19	Romania	Oana-Cristina Tapu & Daniela-Anca Comeaga
20	Scotland	Susanna Young & Frances Lawson
21	Serbia	Marija Bogunvic & Kristina Cikos
22	Slovenia	Viktorija Klanecek & Valerija Tasner
23	Spain	Alicia Sanchez-Anadon & Yolanda Salvo-Sierra
24	Sweden	Anna Forsmark & Carina Ekberg
25	Switzerland	Katharina Von Rufs & Rose-Marie Bussard
26	Turkey	Asli-Baris Tekin & Duygu Karaca
27	Wales	Julie Gore & Rhian Edwards

== Men's singles ==
1st Round (best of 7 legs)
(Wales) Robert Hughes	4
(Gibraltar) George Federico	0
(Serbia) Radivoj Bezbradica	0
(Belgium) Geert De Vos	4
(Finland) Vesa Nuutinen	1
(Northern Ireland) John Elder	4
(Lithuania) Leonidas Smirinenka	4
(Switzerland) Urs von Rufs	1
(Turkey) Eser Tekin	4
(Romania) Daniel Racoveanu	0
(Poland) Patryk Zabka	1
(France) Renaud Lescure	4
(England) Scott Waites	4
(Netherlands) Joey ten Berge	2
(Austria) Christoph Kleindienst
Bye
(Estonia) Tarmo Putsepp
Bye
(Republic of Ireland) Sean McGowan	4
(Iceland) Ivar Jonsson	0
(Scotland) Mike Veitch	4
(Denmark) Frede Johansen	2
(Spain) Casiano Paniagua-Palma	0
(Czech Republic) Michal Ondo	4
(Sweden) Dennis Nilsson	4
(Slovenia) Bac Ales	1
(Latvia) Janis Armanovics	0
(Greece) Kyriakos Anastasiadis	4
(Norway) Øyvind Aasland	4
(Germany) Marko Puls	0
(Italy) Loris Polese
Bye
(Scotland) John Henderson	4
(Gibraltar) Darren Olivero	3
(England) Darryl Fitton	2
(Sweden) Daniel Larsson	4
(Switzerland) Pascal Barbezat	1
(Greece) Kostas Pantelidis	4
(Denmark) Stig Jorgensen	4
(Latvia) Guntars Grebskis	3
(Italy) Danilo Vigato	4
(Finland) Petri Korte	1
(Slovenia) Joze Vautar	4
(Northern Ireland) Gary Elliot	1
(Serbia) Oliver Ferenc	1
(Republic of Ireland) Martin McCloskey	4
(Czech Republic) David Miklas	4
(Gibraltar) Dylan Duo	0
(Germany) Kevin Münch	4
(Gibraltar) John Duo	0
(Norway) Robert Wagner	4
(Iceland) Aegir Bjornsson	3
(Romania) Laszlo Kadar	0
(France) Christian Demazure	4
(Spain) Francisco-Javier Gonzalez	4
(Austria) Rene Jorgensen	2
(Belgium) Ronny Huybrechts	4
(Lithuania) Tomas Sakys	0
(Wales) Stephen Cake	4
(Estonia) Mati Leis	1
(Poland) Krzysztof Galus	4
(Turkey) Engin Kayaoglu	3
(Netherlands) Willy van de Wiel
Bye
(England) Martin Adams
Bye
(Poland) Marek Kubowicz	0
(Spain) Antonio Jimenez-Cabrera	4
(Slovenia) Mitja Habijan	1
(Turkey) Utku Karaca	4
(Austria) Franz Thaler	2
(Denmark) Glenn Honore	4
(Lithuania) Arūnas Čiplys	4
(Northern Ireland) Michael Mansell	1
(Serbia) Branko Grba	0
(Netherlands) Rick Hofstra	4
(Scotland) Ewan Hyslop	4
(Germany) Swen Seifert	1
(France) Michel Boulet
Bye
(Belgium) Kurt van de Rijck
Bye
(Switzerland) Thomas Bremgartner	4
(Estonia) Kristo Mannik	1
(Italy) Claudio Dolcetti	4
(Greece) Emmanouil Vichos	1
(Czech Republic) Jiri Jenicek	0
(Wales) Martin Phillips	4
(Sweden) Magnus Caris	4
(Latvia) Imants Nikolajevs	0
(Republic of Ireland) Stephen McDonnell	4
(Norway) Vegar Elvevoll	1
(Romania) Vlad-Christian Popa	4
(Iceland) Fridrik Diego	1
(Finland) Ulf Ceder
Bye
(Denmark) Vladimir Andersen
Bye
(Scotland) Ross Montgomery	4
(Sweden) Orjan Thomsson	0
(Estonia) Kaido Poldma	1
(Netherlands) Cor Ernst	4
(Latvia) Richards Tomasickis	0
(Belgium) Kim Huybrechts	4
(Austria) Alireza Ghafouri	2
(Republic of Ireland) Paddy Meaney	4
(Norway) Thor-Helmer Johansen	4
(Romania) Claudius-Bert Kuvi	0
(Turkey) Emre Toros	0
(Wales) Wayne Warren	4
(Greece) Stathis Pantelidis
Bye
(Iceland) Einar Moller
Bye
(Serbia) Vladimir Pavkovic	1
(Slovenia) Leopold Slanic	4
(Lithuania) Osvaldas Ksanys	2
(Germany) Colin Rice	4
(Switzerland) Roman Bleistein	4
(Czech Republic) Miroslav Slusarcik	1
(France) Cyril Blot	2
(Finland) Jaakko Kiiski	4
(Spain) Rafael Higuera-Ruiz	4
(Italy) Luigi Marino	1
(England) Tony O'Shea	4
(Poland) Marcin Koziarek	0
(Northern Ireland) Barry Copeland
Bye

2nd Round (best of 7 legs)
(Wales) Robert Hughes	4
(Belgium) Geert De Vos	0
(Northern Ireland) John Elder	4
(Lithuania) Leonidas Smirinenka	1
(Turkey) Eser Tekin	4
(France) Renaud Lescure	1
(England) Scott Waites	4
(Austria) Christoph Kleindienst	1
(Estonia) Tarmo Putsepp	1
(Republic of Ireland) Sean McGowan	4
(Scotland) Mike Veitch	4
(Czech Republic) Michal Ondo	1
(Sweden) Dennis Nilsson	4
(Greece) Kyriakos Anastasiadis	1
(Norway) Øyvind Aasland	4
(Italy) Loris Polese	1
(Scotland) John Henderson	4
(Sweden) Daniel Larsson	1
(Greece) Kostas Pantelidis	4
(Denmark) Stig Jorgensen	1
(Italy) Danilo Vigato	4
(Slovenia) Joze Vautar	2
(Republic of Ireland) Martin McCloskey	4
(Czech Republic) David Miklas	0
(Germany) Kevin Münch	3
(Norway) Robert Wagner	4
(France) Christian Demazure	2
(Spain) Francisco-Javier Gonzalez	4
(Belgium) Ronny Huybrechts	4
(Wales) Stephen Cake	3
(Poland) Krzysztof Galus	1
(Netherlands) Willy van de Wiel	4
(England) Martin Adams	4
(Spain) Antonio Jimenez-Cabrera	0
(Turkey) Utku Karaca	0
(Denmark) Glenn Honore	4
(Lithuania) Arūnas Čiplys	0
(Netherlands) Rick Hofstra	4
(Scotland) Ewan Hyslop	4
(France) Michel Boulet	3
(Belgium) Kurt van de Rijck	3
(Switzerland) Thomas Bremgartner	4
(Italy) Claudio Dolcetti	1
(Wales) Martin Phillips	4
(Sweden) Magnus Caris	4
(Republic of Ireland) Stephen McDonnell	2
(Romania) Vlad-Christian Popa	0
(Finland) Ulf Ceder	4
(Denmark) Vladimir Andersen	3
(Scotland) Ross Montgomery	4
(Netherlands) Cor Ernst	4
(Belgium) Kim Huybrechts	1
(Republic of Ireland) Paddy Meaney	1
(Norway) Thor-Helmer Johansen	4
(Wales) Wayne Warren	4
(Greece) Stathis Pantelidis	1
(Iceland) Einar Moller	1
(Slovenia) Leopold Slanic	4
(Germany) Colin Rice	3
(Switzerland) Roman Bleistein	4
(Finland) Jaakko Kiiski	4
(Spain) Rafael Higuera-Ruiz	3
(England) Tony O'Shea	4
(Northern Ireland) Barry Copeland	1

3rd Round (best of 7 legs)
(Wales) Robert Hughes	1
(Northern Ireland) John Elder	4
(Turkey) Eser Tekin	3
(England) Scott Waites	4
(Republic of Ireland) Sean McGowan	3
(Scotland) Mike Veitch	4
(Sweden) Dennis Nilsson	4
(Norway) Øyvind Aasland	3
(Scotland) John Henderson	4
(Greece) Kostas Pantelidis	3
(Italy) Danilo Vigato	0
(Republic of Ireland) Martin McCloskey	4
(Norway) Robert Wagner	4
(Spain) Francisco-Javier Gonzalez	2
(Belgium) Ronny Huybrechts	2
(Netherlands) Willy van de Wiel	4
(England) Martin Adams	4
(Denmark) Glenn Honore	1
(Netherlands) Rick Hofstra	4
(Scotland) Ewan Hyslop	0
(Switzerland) Thomas Bremgartner	3
(Wales) Martin Phillips	4
(Sweden) Magnus Caris	4
(Finland) Ulf Ceder	3
(Scotland) Ross Montgomery	3
(Netherlands) Cor Ernst	4
(Norway) Thor-Helmer Johansen	1
(Wales) Wayne Warren	4
(Slovenia) Leopold Slanic	3
(Switzerland) Roman Bleistein	4
(Finland) Jaakko Kiiski	4
(England) Tony O'Shea	2

4th Round (best of 7 legs)
(Northern Ireland) John Elder	2
(England) Scott Waites	4
(Scotland) Mike Veitch	4
(Sweden) Dennis Nilsson	3
(Scotland) John Henderson	2
(Republic of Ireland) Martin McCloskey	4
(Norway) Robert Wagner	1
(Netherlands) Willy van de Wiel	4
(England) Martin Adams	4
(Netherlands) Rick Hofstra	2
(Wales) Martin Phillips	4
(Sweden) Magnus Caris	1
(Netherlands) Cor Ernst	1
(Wales) Wayne Warren	4
(Switzerland) Roman Bleistein	2
(Finland) Jaakko Kiiski	4

Quarter-finals (best of 9 legs)
(England) Scott Waites	3
(Scotland) Mike Veitch	5
(Republic of Ireland) Martin McCloskey	1
(Netherlands) Willy van de Wiel	5
(England) Martin Adams	4
(Wales) Martin Phillips	5
(Wales) Wayne Warren	5
(Finland) Jaakko Kiiski	0

Semi-finals (best of 11 legs)
(Scotland) Mike Veitch	3
(Netherlands) Willy van de Wiel	6
Final (best of 13 legs)
(Netherlands) Willy van de Wiel	3
(Wales) Martin Phillips	7
(Wales) Martin Phillips	6
(Wales) Wayne Warren	1

== Men's pairs ==
1st Round (best of 7 legs)
(England) Martin Adams (England) Scott Waites	4
(Gibraltar) Dylan Dup (Gibraltar) John Duo	3
(Greece) Kyriakos Anastasiadis (Greece) Emmanouil Vichos	0
(France) Renaud Lescure (France) Michel Boulet	4
(Belgium) Kim Huybrechts (Belgium) Ronny Huybrechts	4
(Republic of Ireland) Martin McCloskey (Republic of Ireland) Sean McGowan	3
(Scotland) Mike Veitch (Scotland) John Henderson	4
(Romania) Laszlo Kadar (Romania) Vlad-Christian Popa	2
(Lithuania) Osvaldas Ksanys (Lithuania) Arūnas Čiplys	1
(Slovenia) Bac Ales (Slovenia) Leopold Slanic	4
(Poland) Marcin Koziarek (Poland) Marek Kubowicz	4
(Serbia) Radivoj Bezbradica (Serbia) Branko Grba	0
(Northern Ireland) Michael Mansell (Northern Ireland) John Elder	4
(Estonia) Tarmo Putsepp (Estonia) Mati Leis	0
(Germany) Marko Puls (Germany) Kevin Münch
Bye
(Wales) Wayne Warren (Wales) Martin Phillips	4
(Gibraltar) Darren Olivero (Gibraltar) George Federico	0
(Spain) Francisco-Javier Gonzalez-Cruz (Spain) Rafael Higuera-Ruiz	2
(Norway) Robert Wagner (Norway) Thor-Helmer Johansen	4
(Denmark) Frede Johansen (Denmark) Glenn Honore	4
(Iceland) Einar Moller (Iceland) Aegir Bjornsson	0
(Finland) Jaakko Kiiski (Finland) Petri Korte	4
(Switzerland) Roman Bleistein (Switzerland) Pascal Barbezat	3
(Italy) Loris Polese (Italy) Luigi Marino	1
(Turkey) Utku Karaca (Turkey) Engin Kayaoglu	4
(Latvia) Imants Nikolajevs (Latvia) Janis Armanovics	0
(Austria) Christoph Kleindienst (Austria) Rene Jorgensen	4
(Netherlands) Willy van de Wiel (Netherlands) Joey ten Berge	4
(Czech Republic) Michal Ondo (Czech Republic) Jiri Jenicek	0
(Sweden) 'Daniel Larsson (Sweden) Magnus Caris
Bye
(Scotland) Ewan Hyslop (Scotland) Ross Montgomery
Bye
(Germany) Colin Rice (Germany) Swen Seifert	1
(England) Tony O'Shea (England) Darryl Fitton	4
(Italy) Claudio Dolcetti (Italy) Danilo Vigato	1
(Poland) Patryk Zabka (Poland) Krzysztof Galus	4
(Spain) Antonio Jimenez-Cabrera (Spain) Casiano Paniagua-Palma	4
(Switzerland) Thomas Bremgartner (Switzerland) Urs Von Rufs	3
(Norway) Vegar Elvevoll (Norway) Øyvind Aasland	4
(Romania) Claudius-Bert Kuvi (Romania) Daniel Racoveanu	2
(Serbia) Vladimir Pavkovic (Serbia) Oliver Ferenc	0
(Republic of Ireland) Paddy Meaney (Republic of Ireland) Stephen McDonnell	4
(Belgium) Kurt van de Rijck (Belgium) Geert De Vos	4
(Czech Republic) David Miklas (Czech Republic) Miroslav Slusarcik	3
(Austria) Alireza Ghafouri (Austria) Franz Thaler
Bye
(Denmark) Stig Jorgensen (Denmark) Vladimir Andersen
Bye
(Turkey) Eser Tekin (Turkey) Emre Toros	2
(Sweden) Orjan Thomsson (Sweden) Dennis Nilsson	4
(Northern Ireland) Barry Copeland (Northern Ireland) Gary Elliot	4
(Slovenia) Joze Vautar (Slovenia) Mitja Habijan	3
(Estonia) Kaido Poldma (Estonia) Kristo Mannik	3
(Lithuania) Leonidas Smirinenka (Lithuania) Tomas Sakys	4
(Latvia) Richards Tomasickis (Latvia) Guntars Grebskis	4
(Iceland) Ivar Jonsson (Iceland) Fridrik Diego	1
(Wales) Stephen Cake (Wales) Robert Hughes	3
(France) Cyril Blot (France) Christian Demazure	4
(Netherlands) Rick Hofstra (Netherlands) Cor Ernst	4
(Greece) Stathis Pantelidis (Greece) Kostas Pantelidis	1
(Finland) Ulf Ceder (Finland) Vesa Nuutinen
Bye

2nd Round (best of 7 legs)
(England) Martin Adams (England) Scott Waites	4
(France) Renaud Lescure (France) Michel Boulet	1
(Belgium) Kim Huybrechts (Belgium) Ronny Huybrechts	4
(Scotland) Mike Veitch (Scotland) John Henderson	2
(Slovenia) Bac Ales (Slovenia) Leopold Slanic	3
(Poland) Marcin Koziarek (Poland) Marek Kubowicz	4
(Northern Ireland) Michael Mansell (Northern Ireland) John Elder	4
(Germany) Marko Puls (Germany) Kevin Münch	1
(Wales) Wayne Warren (Wales) Martin Phillips	4
(Norway) Robert Wagner (Norway) Thor-Helmer Johansen	1
(Denmark) Frede Johansen (Denmark) Glenn Honore	2
(Finland) Jaakko Kiiski (Finland) Petri Korte	4
(Turkey) Utku Karaca (Turkey) Engin Kayaoglu	4
(Austria) Christoph Kleindienst (Austria) Rene Jorgensen	1
(Netherlands) Willy van de Wiel (Netherlands) Joey ten Berge	4
(Sweden) Daniel Larsson (Sweden) Magnus Caris	2
(Scotland) Ewan Hyslop (Scotland) Ross Montgomery	1
(England) Tony O'Shea (England) Darryl Fitton	4
(Poland) Patryk Zabka (Poland) Krzysztof Galus	2
(Spain) Antonio Jimenez-Cabrera (Spain) Casiano Paniagua-Palma	4
(Norway) Vegar Elvevoll (Norway) Øyvind Aasland	4
(Republic of Ireland) Paddy Meaney (Republic of Ireland) Stephen McDonnell	3
(Belgium) Kurt van de Rijck (Belgium) Geert De Vos	4
(Austria) Alireza Ghafouri (Austria) Franz Thaler	1
(Denmark) Stig Jorgensen (Denmark) Vladimir Andersen	3
(Sweden) Orjan Thomsson (Sweden) Dennis Nilsson	4
(Northern Ireland) Barry Copeland (Northern Ireland) Gary Elliot	4
(Lithuania) Leonidas Smirinenka (Lithuania) Tomas Sakys	2
(Latvia) Richards Tomasickis (Latvia) Guntars Grebskis	1
(France) Cyril Blot (France) Christian Demazure	4
(Netherlands) Rick Hofstra (Netherlands) Cor Ernst	4
(Finland) Ulf Ceder (Finland) Vesa Nuutinen	3

3rd Round (best of 7 legs)
(England) Martin Adams (England) Scott Waites	4
(Belgium) Kim Huybrechts (Belgium) Ronny Huybrechts	1
(Poland) Marcin Koziarek (Poland) Marek Kubowicz	3
(Northern Ireland) Michael Mansell (Northern Ireland) John Elder	4
(Wales) Wayne Warren (Wales) Martin Phillips	4
(Finland) Jaakko Kiiski (Finland) Petri Korte	1
(Turkey) Utku Karaca (Turkey) Engin Kayaoglu	1
(Netherlands) Willy van de Wiel (Netherlands) Joey ten Berge	4
(England) Tony O'Shea (England) Darryl Fitton	4
(Spain) Antonio Jimenez-Cabrera (Spain) Casiano Paniagua-Palma	0
(Norway) Vegar Elvevoll (Norway) Øyvind Aasland	3
(Belgium) Kurt van de Rijck (Belgium) Geert De Vos	4
(Sweden) Orjan Thomsson (Sweden) Dennis Nilsson	1
(Northern Ireland) Barry Copeland (Northern Ireland) Gary Elliot	4
(France) Cyril Blot (France) Christian Demazure	0
(Netherlands) Rick Hofstra (Netherlands) Cor Ernst	4

Quarter-finals (best of 7 legs)
(England) Martin Adams (England) Scott Waites	4
(Northern Ireland) Michael Mansell (Northern Ireland) John Elder	0
(Wales) Wayne Warren (Wales) Martin Phillips	4
(Netherlands) Willy van de Wiel (Netherlands) Joey ten Berge	2
(England) Tony O'Shea (England) Darryl Fitton	4
(Belgium) Kurt van de Rijck (Belgium) Geert De Vos	3
(Northern Ireland) Barry Copeland (Northern Ireland) Gary Elliot	2
(Netherlands) Rick Hofstra (Netherlands) Cor Ernst	4

Semi-finals (best of 9 legs)
(England) Martin Adams (England) Scott Waites	5
(Wales) Wayne Warren (Wales) Martin Phillips	3
(England) Tony O'Shea (England) Darryl Fitton	5
(Netherlands) Rick Hofstra (Netherlands) Cor Ernst	2

Final (best of 11 legs)
(England) Martin Adams (England) Scott Waites	6
(England) Tony O'Shea (England) Darryl Fitton	4

== Men's team ==
Round Robin

Group A

Pos	Team	Pld	Win	Lose	LF	LA	+/−
1	Ireland	2	2	0	18	13	+5
2	Denmark	2	1	1	17	12	+5
3	Czech Republic	2	0	2	8	18	−10

- Ireland 9 – 8 Denmark
- Ireland 9 – 5 Czech Republic
- Denmark 9 – 3 Czech Republic

Group B

Pos	Team	Pld	Win	Lose	LF	LA	+/−
1	Finland	3	3	0	27	7	+20
2	France	3	1	2	19	20	−1
3	Slovenia	3	1	2	19	26	−7
4	Poland	3	1	2	14	26	−12

- Finland 9 – 2 France
- Finland 9 – 2 Slovenia
- Finland 9 – 3 Poland
- France 9 – 2 Poland
- Slovenia 9 – 8 France
- Poland 9 – 8 Slovenia

Group C

Pos	Team	Pld	Win	Lose	LF	LA	+/−
1	England	3	3	0	27	7	+20
2	Norway	3	1	2	19	20	−1
3	Italy	3	1	2	12	21	−9
4	Turkey	3	1	2	14	24	−10

- England 9 – 4 Norway
- England 9 – 1 Italy
- England 9 – 2 Turkey
- Norway 9 – 2 Italy
- Italy 9 – 3 Turkey
- Turkey 9 – 6 Norway

Group D

Pos	Team	Pld	Win	Lose	LF	LA	+/−
1	Scotland	2	2	0	18	2	+16
2	Romania	2	1	1	10	16	−6
3	Estonia	2	0	2	8	18	−10

- Scotland 9 – 1 Romania
- Scotland 9 – 1 Estonia
- Romania 9 – 7 Estonia

Group E

Pos	Team	Pld	Win	Lose	LF	LA	+/−
1	Germany	2	2	0	18	4	+14
2	Greece	2	1	1	12	0	+2
3	Latvia	2	0	2	2	18	−16

- Germany 9 – 3 Greece
- Germany 9 – 1 Latvia
- Greece 9 – 1 Latvia

Group F

Pos	Team	Pld	Win	Lose	LF	LA	+/−
1	Wales	3	3	0	27	7	+20
2	Belgium	3	2	1	22	15	+7
3	Switzerland	3	1	2	15	23	−8
4	Spain	3	0	3	8	27	−19

- Wales 9 – 4 Belgium
- Wales 9 – 3 Switzerland
- Wales 9 – 0 Spain
- Belgium 9 – 3 Switzerland
- Belgium 9 – 3 Spain
- Switzerland 9 – 5 Spain

Group G

Pos	Team	Pld	Win	Lose	LF	LA	+/−
1	Northern Ireland	3	3	0	27	7	+20
2	Sweden	3	2	1	23	16	+7
3	Lithuania	3	1	2	13	19	−6
4	Austria	3	0	3	6	27	−21

- Northern Ireland 9 – 5 Sweden
- Northern Ireland 9 – 2 Lithuania
- Northern Ireland 9 – 0 Austria
- Sweden 9 – 2 Lithuania
- Sweden 9 – 5 Austria
- Lithuania 9 – 1 Austria

Group H

Pos	Team	Pld	Win	Lose	LF	LA	+/−
1	Netherlands	2	2	0	18	0	+18
2	Iceland	2	1	1	9	12	−3
3	Serbia	2	0	2	3	18	−15

- Netherlands 9 – 0 Iceland
- Netherlands 9 – 0 Serbia
- Iceland 9 – 3 Serbia

Knock Out

Last 16 (best of 17 legs)
A1	Ireland	6
G2	Sweden	9
B1	Finland	9
H2	Iceland	2
C1	England	9
E2	Greece	0
D1	Scotland	5
F2	Belgium	9
E1	Germany	7
C2	Norway	9
F1	Wales	9
D2	Romania	7
G1	Northern Ireland	4
A2	Denmark	9
H1	Netherlands	9
B2	France	4

Quarter-finals (best of 17 legs)
G2	Sweden	9
B1	Finland	3
C1	England	6
F2	Belgium	9
C2	Norway	9
F1	Wales	5
A2	Denmark	4
H1	Netherlands	9

Semi-finals (best of 17 legs)
G2	Sweden	6
F2	Belgium	9
C2	Norway	4
H1	Netherlands	9

Final (best of 17 legs)
F2	Belgium	9
H1	Netherlands	5

== Women's singles ==
1st Round (best of 7 legs)
(Scotland) Frances Lawson
Bye
(Lithuania) Ryte Banatiene	4
(Czech Republic) Marcela Melicharova	0
(England) Trina Gulliver	4
(Greece) Maria Prompona	0
(Norway) Veronica Simonsen	3
(Turkey) Asli-Baris Tekin	4
(Austria) Ursula Binder
Bye
(Italy) Veleda Gaiga	4
(Latvia) Vita Grebska	2
(Germany) Stefanie Lück	4
(Iceland) Sigridur-Gudrun Jonsdottir	0
(Northern Ireland) Nicole Dillon
Bye
(Sweden) Carina Ekberg
Bye
(Netherlands) Francis Hoenselaar	4
(Republic of Ireland) Caroline Breen	0
(Finland) Tarja Salminen	4
(Denmark) Mette Funch	0
(France) Dorothee Lemaire	1
(Wales) Rhian Edwards	4
(Serbia) Marija Bogunvic	2
(Slovenia) Valerija Tasner	4
(Romania) Daniela-Anca Comeaga	0
(Belgium) Brigitte Smets	4
(Switzerland) Rose-Marie Bussard	4
(Spain) Yolanda Salvo-Sierra	3
(Poland) Ewa Zabka
Bye
(Denmark) Christina Buchwald
Bye
(Spain) Alicia Sanchez-Anadon	2
(Scotland) Susanna Young	4
(Poland) Malgorzara Storczyk	2
(Lithuania) Erika Bagdonaviciene	4
(Latvia) Ligita Vilks	0
(Finland) Kirsi Viinikainen	4
(Belgium) Inge van Genechten
Bye
(Switzerland) Katharina Von Rufs	1
(Austria) Daniela Piassoni	4
(Republic of Ireland) Angela De Ward	4
(Turkey) Duygu Karaca	2
(Wales) Julie Gore
Bye
(Netherlands) Karin Krappen
Bye
(Serbia) Kristina Cikos	0
(Romania) Oana-Cristina Tapu	4
(France) Carole Frison	2
(Sweden) Anna Forsmark	4
(Greece) Giota Sfakioti	1
(Slovenia) Viktorija Klanecek	4
(Northern Ireland) Denise Cassidy	4
(Czech Republic) Radana Jandova	0
(Germany) Heike Ernst	4
(Norway) Marianne Halvorsen	0
(Italy) Romanan Petrini	1
(Iceland) Petrea Fridriksdottir	4
(England) Lisa Ashton
Bye

2nd Round (best of 7 legs)
(Scotland) Frances Lawson	4
(Lithuania) Ryte Banatiene	2
(England) Trina Gulliver	4
(Turkey) Asli-Baris Tekin	1
(Austria) Ursula Binder	4
(Italy) Veleda Gaiga	3
(Germany) Stefanie Lück	1
(Northern Ireland) Nicole Dillon	4
(Sweden) Carina Ekberg	1
(Netherlands) Francis Hoenselaar	4
(Finland) Tarja Salminen	1
(Wales) Rhian Edwards	4
(Slovenia) Valerija Tasner	2
(Belgium) Brigitte Smets	4
(Switzerland) Rose-Marie Bussard	4
(Poland) Ewa Zabka	0
(Denmark) Christina Buchwald	1
(Scotland) Susanna Young	4
(Lithuania) Erika Bagdonaviciene	0
(Finland) Kirsi Viinikainen	4
(Belgium) Inge van Genechten	4
(Austria) Daniela Piassoni	1
(Republic of Ireland) Angela De Ward	3
(Wales) Julie Gore	4
(Netherlands) Karin Krappen	4
(Romania) Oana-Cristina Tapu	0
(Sweden) Anna Forsmark	4
(Slovenia) Viktorija Klanecek	3
(Northern Ireland) Denise Cassidy	4
(Germany) Heike Ernst	3
(Iceland) Petrea Fridriksdottir	0
(England) Lisa Ashton	4

3rd Round (best of 7 legs)
(Scotland) Frances Lawson	2
(England) Trina Gulliver	4
(Austria) Ursula Binder	1
(Northern Ireland) Nicole Dillon	4
(Netherlands) Francis Hoenselaar	4
(Wales) Rhian Edwards	2
(Belgium) Brigitte Smets	3
(Switzerland) Rose-Marie Bussard	4
(Scotland) Susanna Young	2
(Finland) Kirsi Viinikainen	4
(Belgium) Inge van Genechten	0
(Wales) Julie Gore	4
(Netherlands) Karin Krappen	3
(Sweden) Anna Forsmark	4
(Northern Ireland) Denise Cassidy	0
(England) Lisa Ashton	4

Quarter-finals (best of 9 legs)
(England) Trina Gulliver	5
(Northern Ireland) Nicole Dillon	1
(Netherlands) Francis Hoenselaar	5
(Switzerland) Rose-Marie Bussard	0
(Finland) Kirsi Viinikainen	1
(Wales) Julie Gore	5
(Sweden) Anna Forsmark	3
(England) Lisa Ashton	5

Semi-finals (best of 11 legs)
(England) Trina Gulliver	5
(Netherlands) Francis Hoenselaar	6
(Wales) Julie Gore	6
(England) Lisa Ashton	4

Final (best of 13 legs)
(Netherlands) Francis Hoenselaar	7
(Wales) Julie Gore	5

== Women's pairs ==
Round Robin

Group A

Pos	Team	Pld	Win	Lose	LF	LA	+/−
1	(Sweden) Anna Forsmark (Sweden) Carina Ekberg	2	2	0	8	3	+5
2	(Belgium) Inge Van Genechten (Belgium) Brigitte Smets	2	1	1	6	7	−1
3	(Turkey) Asli-Baris Tekin (Turkey) Duygu Karaca	2	0	2	4	8	−4

- (Sweden) Anna Forsmark & Carina Ekberg 4 – 2 (Belgium) Inge Van Genechten & Brigitte Smets
- (Sweden) Anna Forsmark & Carina Ekberg 4 – 1 (Turkey) Asli-Baris Tekin & Duygu Karaca
- (Belgium) Inge Van Genechten & Brigitte Smets 4 – 3 (Turkey) Asli-Baris Tekin & Duygu Karaca

Group B

Pos	Team	Pld	Win	Lose	LF	LA	+/−
1	(Republic of Ireland) Caroline Breen (Republic of Ireland) Angela De Ward	3	3	0	12	2	+10
2	(Austria) Daniela Piassoni (Austria) Ursula Binder	3	2	1	9	8	+1
3	(Lithuania) Erika Bagdonaviciene (Lithuania) Ryte Banatiene	3	1	2	8	10	−2
4	(Iceland) Sigridur-Gudrun Jonsdottir (Iceland) Petrea Fridriksdottir	3	0	3	3	12	−9

- (Republic of Ireland) Caroline Breen & Christine Hunt 4 – 1 (Austria) Daniela Piassoni & Ursula Binder
- (Republic of Ireland) Caroline Breen & Christine Hunt 4 – 1 (Lithuania) Erika Bagdonaviciene & Ryte Banatiene
- (Republic of Ireland) Caroline Breen & Christine Hunt 4 – 0 (Iceland) Sigridur-Gudrun Jonsdottir & Petrea Fridriksdottir
- (Austria) Daniela Piassoni & Ursula Binder 4 – 3 (Lithuania) Erika Bagdonaviciene & Ryte Banatiene
- (Austria) Daniela Piassoni & Ursula Binder 4 – 1 (Iceland) Sigridur-Gudrun Jonsdottir & Petrea Fridriksdottir
- (Lithuania) Erika Bagdonaviciene & Ryte Banatiene 4 – 2 (Iceland) Sigridur-Gudrun Jonsdottir & Petrea Fridriksdottir

Group C

Pos	Team	Pld	Win	Lose	LF	LA	+/−
1	(Norway) Veronica Simonsen (Norway) Marianne Halvorsen	2	2	0	8	3	+5
2	(Poland) Ewa Zabka (Poland) Malgorzara Storczyk	2	1	1	4	7	−3
3	(Czech Republic) Radana Jandova (Czech Republic) Marcela Melicharova	2	0	2	6	8	−2

- (Norway) Veronica Simonsen & Marianne Halvorsen 4 – 0 (Poland) Ewa Zabka & Malgorzara Storczyk
- (Norway) Veronica Simonsen & Marianne Halvorsen 4 – 3 (Czech Republic) Radana Jandova & Marcela Melicharova
- (Poland) Ewa Zabka & Malgorzara Storczyk 4 – 3 (Czech Republic) Radana Jandova & Marcela Melicharova

Group D

Pos	Team	Pld	Win	Lose	LF	LA	+/−
1	(Scotland) Susanna Young (Scotland) Frances Lawson	2	2	0	8	0	+8
2	(Romania) Oana-Cristina Tapu (Romania) Daniela-Anca Comeaga	2	1	1	4	7	−3
3	(Switzerland) Katharina Von Rufs (Switzerland) Rose-Marie Bussard	2	0	2	3	8	−5

- (Scotland) Susanna Young & Frances Lawson 4 – 0 (Romania) Oana-Cristina Tapu & Daniela-Anca Comeaga
- (Scotland) Susanna Young & Frances Lawson 4 – 0 (Switzerland) Katharina Von Rufs & Rose-Marie Bussard
- (Romania) Oana-Cristina Tapu & Daniela-Anca Comeaga 4 – 3 (Switzerland) Katharina Von Rufs & Rose-Marie Bussard

Group E

Pos	Team	Pld	Win	Lose	LF	LA	+/−
1	(England) Trina Gulliver (England) Lisa Ashton	2	2	0	8	1	+7
2	(Spain) Alicia Sanchez-Anadon (Spain) Yolanda Salvo-Sierra	2	1	1	4	4	0
3	(Denmark) Mette Funch (Denmark) Christina Buchwald	2	0	2	1	8	−7

- (England) Trina Gulliver & Lisa Ashton 4 – 0 (Spain) Alicia Sanchez-Anadon & Yolanda Salvo-Sierra
- (England) Trina Gulliver & Lisa Ashton 4 – 1 (Denmark) Mette Funch & Christina Buchwald
- (Spain) Alicia Sanchez-Anadon & Yolanda Salvo-Sierra 4 – 0 (Denmark) Mette Funch & Christina Buchwald

Group F

Pos	Team	Pld	Win	Lose	LF	LA	+/−
1	(Netherlands) Karin Krappen (Netherlands) Francis Hoenselaar	3	3	0	12	3	+9
2	(Northern Ireland) Nicole Dillon (Northern Ireland) Denise Cassidy	3	2	1	11	7	+4
3	(France) Dorothee Lemaire (France) Carole Frison	3	1	2	6	8	−2
4	(Latvia) Ligita Vilks (Latvia) Vita Grebska	3	0	3	1	12	−11

- (Netherlands) Karin Krappen & Francis Hoenselaar 4 – 3 (Northern Ireland) Nicole Dillon & Denise Cassidy
- (Netherlands) Karin Krappen & Francis Hoenselaar 4 – 0 (France) Dorothee Lemaire & Carole Frison
- (Netherlands) Karin Krappen & Francis Hoenselaar 4 – 0 (Latvia) Ligita Vilks & Vita Grebska
- (Northern Ireland) Nicole Dillon & Denise Cassidy 4 – 2 (France) Dorothee Lemaire & Carole Frison
- (Northern Ireland) Nicole Dillon & Denise Cassidy 4 – 1 (Latvia) Ligita Vilks & Vita Grebska
- (France) Dorothee Lemaire & Carole Frison 4 – 0 (Latvia) Ligita Vilks & Vita Grebska

Group G

Pos	Team	Pld	Win	Lose	LF	LA	+/−
1	(Germany) Heike Ernst (Germany) Stefanie Lück	3	3	0	12	5	+7
2	(Finland) Tarja Salminen (Finland) Kirsi Viinikainen	3	2	1	11	4	+7
3	(Italy) Veleda Gaiga (Italy) Romanan Petrini	3	1	2	5	11	−6
4	(Greece) Giota Sfakioti (Greece) Maria Prompona	3	0	3	4	12	−8

- (Germany) Heike Ernst & Stefanie Lück 4 – 3 (Finland) Tarja Salminen & Kirsi Viinikainen
- (Germany) Heike Ernst & Stefanie Lück 4 – 1 (Italy) Veleda Gaiga & Romanan Petrini
- (Germany) Heike Ernst & Stefanie Lück 4 – 1 (Greece) Giota Sfakioti & Maria Prompona
- (Finland) Tarja Salminen & Kirsi Viinikainen 4 – 0 (Italy) Veleda Gaiga & Romanan Petrini
- (Finland) Tarja Salminen & Kirsi Viinikainen 4 – 0 (Greece) Giota Sfakioti & Maria Prompona
- (Italy) Veleda Gaiga & Romanan Petrini 4 – 3 (Greece) Giota Sfakioti & Maria Prompona

Group H

Pos	Team	Pld	Win	Lose	LF	LA	+/−
1	(Wales) Julie Gore (Wales) Rhian Edwards	2	2	0	8	1	+7
2	(Slovenia) Viktorija Klanecek (Slovenia) Valerija Tasner	2	1	1	5	7	−2
3	(Serbia) Marija Bogunovic (Serbia) Kristina Cikos	2	0	2	3	8	−5

- (Wales) Julie Gore & Rhian Edwards 4 – 1 (Slovenia) Viktorija Klanecek & Valerija Tasner
- (Wales) Julie Gore & Rhian Edwards 4 – 0 (Serbia) Marija Bogunovic & Kristina Cikos
- (Slovenia) Viktorija Klanecek & Valerija Tasner 4 – 3 (Serbia) Marija Bogunovic & Kristina Cikos

Knock Out

Last 16 (best of 7 legs)
A1	(Sweden) Anna Forsmark (Sweden) Carina Ekberg	2
G2	(Finland) Tarja Salminen (Finland) Kirsi Viinikainen	4
B1	(Republic of Ireland) Caroline Breen (Republic of Ireland) Angela De Ward	4
H2	(Slovenia) Viktorija Klanecek (Slovenia) Valerija Tasner	2
C1	(Norway) Veronica Simonsen (Norway) Marianne Halvorsen	2
E2	(Spain) Alicia Sanchez-Anadon (Spain) Yolanda Salvo-Sierra	4
D1	(Scotland) Susanna Young (Scotland) Frances Lawson	2
F2	(Northern Ireland) Nicole Dillon (Northern Ireland) Denise Cassidy	4
E1	(England) Trina Gulliver (England) Lisa Ashton	4
C2	(Poland) Ewa Zabka (Poland) Malgorzara Storczyk	0
F1	(Netherlands) Karin Krappen (Netherlands) Francis Hoenselaar	4
D2	(Romania) Oana-Cristina Tapu (Romania) Daniela-Anca Comeaga	0
G1	(Germany) Heike Ernst (Germany) Stefanie Lück	4
A2	(Belgium) Inge Van Genechten (Belgium) Brigitte Smets	0
H1	(Wales) Julie Gore (Wales) Rhian Edwards	4
B2	(Austria) Daniela Piassoni (Austria) Ursula Binder	2

Quarter-finals (best of 7 legs)
G2	(Finland) Tarja Salminen (Finland) Kirsi Viinikainen	2
B1	(Republic of Ireland) Caroline Breen (Republic of Ireland) Angela De Ward	4
E2	(Spain) Alicia Sanchez-Anadon (Spain) Yolanda Salvo-Sierra	0
F2	(Northern Ireland) Nicole Dillon (Northern Ireland) Denise Cassidy	4
E1	(England) Trina Gulliver (England) Lisa Ashton	4
F1	(Netherlands) Karin Krappen (Netherlands) Francis Hoenselaar	2
G1	(Germany) Heike Ernst (Germany) Stefanie Lück	1
H1	(Wales) Julie Gore (Wales) Rhian Edwards	4

Semi-finals (best of 7 legs)
B1	(Republic of Ireland) Caroline Breen (Republic of Ireland) Angela De Ward	4
F2	(Northern Ireland) Nicole Dillon (Northern Ireland) Denise Cassidy	3
E1	(England) Trina Gulliver (England) Lisa Ashton	1
H1	(Wales) Julie Gore (Wales) Rhian Edwards	4

Final (best of 11 legs)
B1	(Republic of Ireland) Caroline Breen (Republic of Ireland) Angela De Ward	2
H1	(Wales) Julie Gore (Wales) Rhian Edwards	6
