= Estonia Open =

International darts competition

Tournament information
- Venue: Sokos Hotel Viru
- Location: Tallinn
- Country: Estonia
- Established: 2004
- Organisation(s): WDF
- Format: Legs
- Prize fund: €3,720
- Month(s) Played: April

Current champion(s)
- Dennis Nilsson (men's); Paige Pauling (women's)

The Estonia Open is a darts tournament that has been held since 2007.

== List of winners ==
=== Men's ===
Year	Champion	Av.	Score	Runner-Up	Av.	Prize Money			Venue
Year	Champion	Av.	Score	Runner-Up	Av.	Total	Ch.	R.-Up	Venue
2004	Tilt Haidak	n/a	beat	Seppo Kirjavainen	n/a	€1,000	€400	€200	Tallinn
2005	(Finland)	n/a	6 – 2	Žanis Buklovskis	n/a	€1,000	€400	€200	Villa Andropoff, Parnumaa
2006	Juris Aleksāns	n/a	beat	Aigars Strēlis	n/a	€1,000	€400	€200	Villa Andropoff, Parnumaa
2007	Tomas Šakys	n/a	beat	Arvydas Kvedaras	n/a	€1,000	€400	€200	Villa Andropoff, Parnumaa
2008	Tomas Šakys (2)	72.84	5 – 1	Ian Hoeve	68.45	€1,000	€400	€200	Villa Andropoff, Parnumaa
2009	Arūnas Čiplys	79.62	5 – 1	Matti Hatinen	79.05	€1,000	€400	€200	Villa Andropoff, Parnumaa
2010	Vesa Nuutinen	n/a	5 – 1	Veijo Viinikka	n/a	€3,200	€1,500	€700	Villa Andropoff, Parnumaa
2011	Johan Engström	n/a	5 – 2	Arūnas Čiplys	n/a	€3,200	€1,500	€700	Baribal Billiards Club, Tallinn
2012	Darius Labanauskas	68.85	5 – 3	Ali Roberts	67.56	€2,200	€1,000	€500	Baribal Billiards Club, Tallinn
2013	Darius Labanauskas (2)	n/a	5 – 0	Madars Razma	n/a	€2,200	€1,000	€500	Europa Hotel, Tallinn
2014	Geert De Vos	84.51	5 – 4	Darius Labanauskas	89.19	€2,200	€1,000	€500	Europa Hotel, Tallinn
2015	Darius Labanauskas (3)	95.13	5 – 0	Madars Razma	87.18	€2,200	€1,000	€500	Dzingel Hotel, Tallinn
2016	Peter Sajwani	n/a	5 – 2	(Norway) Robert Wagner	n/a	€2,200	€1,000	€500	Dzingel Hotel, Tallinn
2017	Peter Sajwani (2)	92.17	5 – 4	Darius Labanauskas	92.34	€2,200	€1,000	€500	Dzingel Hotel, Tallinn
2018	Aleksandr Oreshkin	71.89	5 – 3	Neil Hembrow	70.37	€1,930	€700	€350	Radisson Blu Hotel Olümpia, Tallinn
2019	John Scott	77.46	5 – 4	Tobias Lundblad	75.02	€1,930	€700	€350	Radisson Blu Hotel Olümpia, Tallinn
2023	Valters Melderis	73.95	5 – 4	Jonas Masalin	75.07	€2,400	€800	€400	Radisson Blu Hotel Olümpia, Tallinn
2024	Björn Lejon	81.27	5 – 3	Ralfs Laumanis	78.70	€1,820	€600	€300	Radisson Blu Hotel Olümpia, Tallinn
2025	Dennis Nilsson	79.61	6 – 2	Sybren Gijbels	76.43	€1,820	€600	€300	Sokos Hotel Viru, Tallinn

=== Women's ===
Year	Champion (average in final)	Score	Runner-up (average in final)	Total prize money	Champion	Runner-up
2004	(Estonia) Triin Timmermann	beat	(Finland) Pirjo Ruotsalainen			
2005	(Finland)	beat	(Estonia) Reili Roodla			
2006	(Lithuania) Rytė Banaitienė	beat	(Estonia) Reili Roodla			
2007	(Latvia) Zeltīte Putniņa	beat	(Lithuania) Irena Čiplienė			
2008	(Latvia) Natālija Zelenika	beat	(Latvia) Zeltīte Putniņa			
2009	(Finland) Maret Liiri	4 – 2	(Latvia) Ieva Brikmane			
2010	(Finland) Tarja Salminen	4 – 0	(Latvia) Vita Grebska			
2011	Kirsi Viinikainen	4 – 1	Maret Liiri			
2012	Irina Armstrong 57.33	4 – 1	Maret Liiri 52.20			
2013	Irina Armstrong	beat	Kirsi Viinikainen			
2014	Kirsi Viinikainen 51.66	4 – 2	Kaisu Rekinen 53.70			
2015	Maret Liiri 62.73	4 – 2	Kirsi Viinikainen 56.28			
2016	(Finland) Kaisu Rekinen	4 – 1	(Sweden) Linda Nilsson			
2017	Kaisu Rekinen 64.20	4 – 2	Helene Sundelin 61.56			
2018	Olga Abramova 57.55	4 – 1	Kaisu Rekinen 53.57			
2019	Kaisu Rekinen 72.42	4 – 0	Marika Juhola 56.10	€600	€240	€120
2023	Kirsi Viinikainen 64.48	4 – 2	Kaisu Rekinen 57.38	€1,000	€400	€200
2024	Anna Forsmark 61.69	4 – 2	Maud Jansson 55.98	€760	€300	€150
2025	Paige Pauling 76.15	6 – 5	Kirsi Viinikainen 76.24	€760	€300	€150

=== Tallinn Open Men's ===
From 2023 a new tournament was created which would coincide with the Estonia Open, this was called the Tallinn Open. The Tallinn Open was awarded as a bronze ranked tournament by the World Darts Federation in 2023.

Year	Champion	Av.	Score	Runner-Up	Av.	Prize Money			Venue
Year	Champion	Av.	Score	Runner-Up	Av.	Total	Ch.	R.-Up	Venue
2023	(England) John Scott	71.95	5 – 4	Petri Rasmus	69.72	€1,820	€600	€300	Radisson Blu Hotel Olümpia, Tallinn
2024	Scott Walters	83.94	5 – 1	Sybren Gijbels	78.79	€1,600	€500	€200	Radisson Blu Hotel Olümpia, Tallinn
2025	(England) Darren Williams	84.79	6 – 2	Jonas Masalin	78.20	€1,820	€600	€300	Sokos Hotel Viru, Tallinn

=== Tallinn Open Women's ===
Year	Champion	Av.	Score	Runner-Up	Av.	Prize Money			Venue
Year	Champion	Av.	Score	Runner-Up	Av.	Total	Ch.	R.-Up	Venue
2023	Kirsi Viinikainen	74.45	4 – 2	Maud Jansson	62.68	€760	€300	€150	Radisson Blu Hotel Olümpia, Tallinn
2024	Gréta Tekauer	64.30	4 – 1	Lerena Rietbergen	66.74	€760	€300	€150	Radisson Blu Hotel Olümpia, Tallinn
2025	Kirsi Viinikainen (2)	72.23	6 – 1	Maud Jansson	55.90	€760	€300	€150	Sokos Hotel Viru, Tallinn
