= Sajwan =

Sajwan is a surname. Notable people with the surname include:

- Aditi Sajwan, Indian television actress
- Shoorveer Singh Sajwan (born 1950), Indian politician
- Vijaypal Singh Sajwan (born 1958), Indian politician

== See also ==
- Sajwan Nagar
- Sajwani
