= 2010 Apatin Open darts =

Apatin Open

Tournament information
- Dates: 11 July 2010
- Country: Serbia
- Organisation(s): WDF
- Winner's share: €600

Champion(s)
- (Hungary) Nandor Bezzeg

2010 Apatin Open is a darts tournament, which took place in Apatin, Serbia in 2010.

== Results ==
Quarter-finals
(Hungary)	Nandor Bezzeg	4
(Serbia)	Nenad Kovacevic	0
(Serbia)	Radivoj Bezbradica	4
(Serbia)	Ljubomir Krkljes	0
(Slovenia)	Vastimir Gavrilovic	4
(Serbia)	Stevan Djokic	1
(Serbia)	Oliver Ferenc	4
(Serbia)	Branko Grba	3

Semi-finals
(Hungary)	Nandor Bezzeg	5
(Serbia)	Radivoj Bezbradica	4
(Slovenia)	Vastimir Gavrilovic	5
(Serbia)	Oliver Ferenc	4

Final
(Serbia)	Nandor Bezzeg	6
(Slovenia)	Vastimir Gavrilovic	3
