= László Kádár =

Romanian and Hungarian darts player (born 1969)

Personal information
- Nickname: "The Teacher"
- Born: 31 March 1969 (age 57) Târgu Mureș, Romania

Sport
- Sport: Darts
- Playing since: 2010
- Darts: 24g Target Perfect Storm
- Laterality: Right-handed
- Walk-on music: "The Final Countdown" by Europe

Organisation (see split in darts)
- BDO: 2010–2020
- WDF: 2010–present
- Current world ranking: (WDF) 101 ▼7 (17 August 2026) (PDC) 165 ▼1 (18 October 2026)

WDF major events – best performances
- World Championship: Last 32: 2022
- World Masters: Last 128: 2010, 2025

Other tournament wins
- Years
Apatin Open	2021
Balaton Darts Classics	2022
Romanian Open	2023
Slovak Open	2022
Timisoara Darts Classic	2026
Medal record
Men's Darts
Representing Romania
WDF Europe Cup
Bronze medal – third place	2024 Šamorín	Men's singles

László Kádár (born 31 March 1969) is a Romanian professional darts player who competes in World Darts Federation (WDF) and Professional Darts Corporation (PDC) events. He has won 5 WDF ranking titles. He reached the second round of the 2022 WDF World Darts Championship. He is of Hungarian descent, and competes under a Hungarian flag for PDC events.

== Career ==
Kadar has been playing at international World Darts Federation tournaments since 2010, made his debut at the 2010 WDF Europe Cup, where he was defeated by a whitewash in his opening game against Christian Demazure. In his subsequent 2010 Winmau World Masters debut, Kadar won his first game against Peter Holczer before losing to Dennis Harbour in the third round.

In 2011, Kadar took part in the 2011 WDF World Cup for the first time, winning his first game against Kevin Jacob 4–3 in legs. It was followed by the end against Hiroaki Shimizu in the second round. In the years that followed, Kadar only played the WDF tournaments in his region, primarily in Romania. He landed a bigger success at the 2014 WDF Europe Cup, where it went to the third round in singles competition, but lost 0–4 to Ross Montgomery.

In 2017, he advanced to Last 16 stage at the Hungarian Classic for the first time. Two more rather meager years were then followed by a significant improvement in form from 2020. Kadar made it to the final of the Romanian Open, but had to admit defeat against Nick Kenny. In 2021, he snagged his first tournament victory at the Apatin Open, did it in a decider leg over Oliver Ferenc.

In 2022, he won the Slovak Open against Scott Marsh. As the best Eastern European player in the World Darts Federation rankings, Kadar qualified for the 2022 WDF World Darts Championship for the first time, where in the first round he beat Andreas Harrysson by 2–1 in sets. Kadar survived match darts and advanced to second round, but failed to win a set against Richard Veenstra.

Kadar made his PDC European Tour debut at the 2026 Hungarian Darts Trophy, winning his first round match against Daryl Gurney 6–5 in a deciding leg.

== World Championship results ==
=== WDF ===
- 2022: Second round (lost to Richard Veenstra 0–3) (sets)
- 2023: First round (lost to Edwin Torbjörnsson 0–2)
- 2024: First round (lost to Hannes Schnier 1–2)

== Performance timeline ==
Tournament	2010	2022	2023	2025
WDF Ranked televised events
World Championship	DNQ	2R	1R	DNQ
World Masters	3R	DNQ		2R
