= 2012 Apatin Open darts =

Apatin Open

Tournament information
- Dates: 7 July 2012
- Country: Serbia
- Organisation(s): WDF
- Winner's share: €600

Champion(s)
- (Croatia) Zdravko Antunovic

2012 Apatin Open is a darts tournament, which took place in Apatin, Serbia in 2012.

== Results ==
Round	Player
Winner	(Croatia) Zdravko Antunovic
Final	(Slovenia) Vastimir Gavrilovic
Semi-finals	(Hungary) Nandor Bezzeg
Semi-finals	(Hungary) Istvan Nyiregyhazki
Quarter-finals	(Serbia) Oliver Ferenc
Quarter-finals	(Serbia) Aleksandar Boric
Quarter-finals	(Croatia) Zoran Keser
Quarter-finals	(Serbia) Srdjan Veselinovic
