= God Macabre =

Swedish death metal band

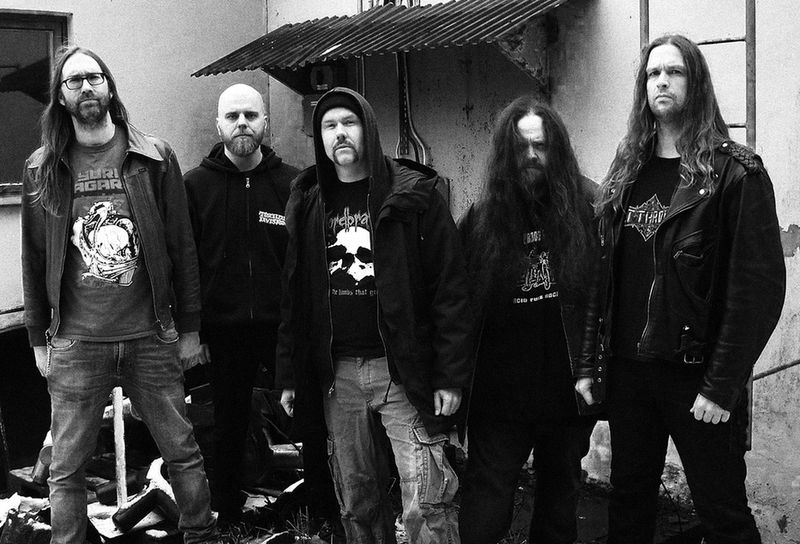
- Swedish death metal band God Macabre 2014. L to R: Jonas Stålhammar, Björn Larsson, Per Boder, Ola Sjöberg, Tobias Gustafsson.

Background information
- Also known as: Botten På Burken; Macabre End
- Origin: Vålberg, Sweden
- Genre: Death metal
- Years active: 1988-1989 (as Botten På Burken); 1989-1991 (as Macabre End); 1991-1992; 2013-present
- Labels: M.B.R., Relapse, H.M.S.S. Records
- Members: Per Boder; Jonas Stålhammar; Ola Sjöberg; Björn Larsson; Tobias Gustafsson
- Past members: Niklas Nilsson; Tomas Johansson

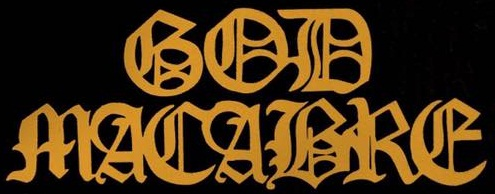
God Macabre Logo

God Macabre is a Swedish death metal band. They were formed in the winter of 1988 as a grindcore band named Botten På Burken. In 1989, they switched to death metal and changed their name to Macabre End. Jonas Stålhammar joined the band in the spring of 1990 and took over most of the songwriting. They released a demo in September 1990, Consumed by Darkness. They changed their name again to God Macabre. In 1992, the band split up, after Johansson and Nilsson had left the band in 1991, and no suitable replacements were found. Boder and Sjöberg formed the band Snake Machine, which evolved into Space Probe Taurus. After the split-up, the only album recorded was released - The Winterlong.... Relapse Records reissued the album in 2002 with the demo as bonus tracks. In March 2008, Swedish label Bloodharvest Records released the Relapse version of the album on vinyl for the first time.There was a second re-release of The Winterlong... in May 2014, this time by Relapse Records with the bonus track "Life's Verge", a song from 1991 that was not recorded until 2013.

== Discography ==
- Consumed by Darkness (demo, September 1990) - as Macabre End

The demo was remixed and released as a 7" in June 1991.

- The Winterlong... (Recorded December 1991, Released December 1993)
- Eve Of Souls Forsaken (Live Album, Recorded September 1991, Released 2010)

== Members ==
Current members

- Per Boder - Vocals (1991-1992, 2013–present)
- Ola Sjöberg - Guitars (1991-1992, 2013–present)
- Jonas Stålhammar - Guitars, Bass (1991-1992), Guitars (2013-present)
- Björn Larsson - Bass (2013–present)
- Tobias Gustafsson - Drums (2013–present)

Former members

- Niklas Nilsson - Drums (1991)
- Tomas Johansson - Bass (1991)
