= 2013 Apatin Open darts =

Apatin Open

Tournament information
- Dates: 7 July 2012
- Country: Serbia
- Organisation(s): WDF
- Winner's share: €600

Champion(s)
- (Slovenia) Vastimir Gavrilovic

2013 Apatin Open is a darts tournament, which took place in Apatin, Serbia in 2013.

== Results ==
Round	Player
Winner	(Slovenia) Vastimir Gavrilovic
Final	(Serbia) Aco Babic
Semi-finals	(Serbia) Aleksandar Boric
Semi-finals	(Serbia) Oliver Ferenc
Quarter-finals	(Croatia) Zdravko Antunovic
Quarter-finals	(Serbia) Sandor Utasi
Quarter-finals	(Serbia) Vladimir Petkovic
Quarter-finals	(Serbia) Aleksandar Milovanovic
