= Krzysztof Chmielewski (darts player) =

Polish darts player

Personal information
- Full name: Krzysztof Chmielewski
- Nickname: "The Joker"
- Born: 20 September 1970 (age 56) Olecko, Poland
- Home town: Ełk, Poland

Sport
- Sport: Darts
- Playing since: 1996
- Darts: 23g Red Dragon
- Laterality: Right-handed

Organisation (see split in darts)
- BDO: 2014–2016
- PDC: 2014–2016
- WDF: 2014–2016

Other tournament wins
- Years
Polish Ch'ship	2014
Polish Cup	2014
Polish Super League	2014

Krzysztof Chmielewski (born 20 September 1970) is a Polish professional darts player who played in World Darts Federation (WDF) and Professional Darts Corporation (PDC) events. He has represented Poland at the PDC World Cup of Darts and WDF Europe Cup. He is the Polish Champion in steel-tip darts.

== Career ==
Chmielewski began his career in the 1996, playing at the soft-tip dartboards. At that time, he competed with the country's top players. After changing his job and moving to Gdańsk, he started playing at the steel-tip dartboards. In 2014, he won the Polish Cup, Polish Super League and finally the Polish Darts Championship. Outstanding successes resulted in an invitation to participate in the 2014 PDC World Cup of Darts, together with Krzysztof Stróżyk. After a fierce match in the first round, they defeated the seeded Finland team (Jarkko Komula and Jani Haavisto) with a score of 5–4 in legs.

In the second round, the Poles faced the Wales team (Mark Webster and Richie Burnett). In the first match, Chmielewski surprisingly defeated Mark Webster by 4–3 in legs. During the match, he finished one of the legs in an unusual way, where with 80 points to the end he threw D20 + D1 and D19, and checked a leg. In the next leg, he had approach to the nine-dart finish, but missed seventh dart at the T20. After the loss of Stróżyk in the match against Burnett, the Poles faced off in a doubles match and, despite the higher average, lost the match 2–4 in legs.

During the 2014 WDF Europe Cup, he lost to Danny Noppert in the first round of singles competition. In the doubles competition, again together with Krzysztof Stróżyk, they were defeated by the eventual winners from England (Scott Mitchell and Scott Waites). In the team competition, Poland advanced from the second place in they group to the knock-out phase, however they lost to the England team in the second round match.

Chmielewski made his next international start in the 2016 WDF Europe Cup. In the singles competition, he advanced to the fourth round by defeated Jacques Labre, Kyle McKinstry and Wayne Halliwell. In the fourth round, he narrowly lost to Daniel Zygla, by 3–4 in legs. In the pairs competition, together with Grzegorz Działkowski, he lost in the first round to the Czech Republic team (Michal Šmejda and Michal Ondo). Poland team had a very good performance, advancing to the quarter-finals in the team competition. In the end, they lost in the competition to Scotland, only by 6–9 in legs.

He unsuccessfully tried his hand at qualifying for the PDC European Tour tournaments. He unsuccessfully tried his hand at qualifying for the PDC European Tour tournaments. In July 2023, Chmielewski returned to active competition at the national level and took part in the qualifying tournament for the 2023 Poland Darts Masters. Unfortunately, he lost in the final match to Łukasz Wacławski by 4–6 in legs.

== Personal life ==
He was an employee of the Pepsi manufacturing plant. Currently, he is offering darts training for aspiring players.

== Performance timeline ==
Tournament	2014
PDC Non-ranked televised events
World Cup of Darts	2R
