= Krzysztof Stróżyk =

Polish darts player

Personal information
- Full name: Krzysztof Stróżyk
- Nickname: "The Angel"
- Born: 28 May 1980 (age 46) Poznań, Poland
- Home town: Poznań, Poland

Sport
- Sport: Darts
- Darts: 23g Winmau
- Laterality: Right-handed

Organisation (see split in darts)
- BDO: 2012–2014
- PDC: 2014–2015
- WDF: 2012–2014

WDF major events – best performances
- World Masters: Last 256: 2012, 2013

Krzysztof Stróżyk (born 28 May 1980) is a Polish professional darts player who played in World Darts Federation (WDF) and Professional Darts Corporation (PDC) events. He has represented Poland at the PDC World Cup of Darts and WDF Europe Cup.

== Career ==
Stróżyk was one of the leading Polish players at the beginning of the second decade of the 21st century. In 2012, as a top player in the national ranking, he was invited to participate in the 2012 Winmau World Masters. In his first round match, he lost to Peter Sajwani by 2–3 in sets. In the same year, he represented Poland at the 2012 WDF Europe Cup. He started singles competition with a confident victory over Darius Labanauskas by 4–0 in legs. In the second round, after an even duel, he lost to Wesley Harms by 2–4 in legs.

In the pairs competition, he played together with Patryk Żabka. After a confidently won duel with players from Catalonia, they lost to Finland team (Jani Haavisto and Kim Viljanen). The Polish national team was very close to winning the first medal by advancing to the quarter-finals in the team competition. In the end, they lost in a duel with England by 3–9 in legs. He made another start in an international tournament at the 2013 Winmau World Masters, where he lost in the first match to Robbie Nelson.

He was invited to participate in the 2014 PDC World Cup of Darts, together with Krzysztof Chmielewski. After a fierce match in the first round, they defeated the seeded Finland team (Jarkko Komula and Jani Haavisto) with a score of 5–4 in legs. In the second round, the Poles faced the Wales team (Mark Webster and Richie Burnett). In the first match, Chmielewski surprisingly defeated Mark Webster by 4–3 in legs. After the loss of Stróżyk in the match against Burnett, the Poles faced off in a doubles match and, despite the higher average, lost the match 3–4 in legs.

During the 2014 WDF Europe Cup, he advanced to the second round of singles competition, where he lost to David Smith-Hayes by 3–4 in legs. In the doubles competition, again together with Krzysztof Chmielewski, they were defeated by the eventual winners from England (Scott Mitchell and Scott Waites). In the team competition, Poland advanced from the second place in they group to the knock-out phase, however they lost to the England team in the second round match.

He unsuccessfully tried his hand at qualifying for the PDC European Tour tournaments.

== Performance timeline ==
Tournament	2012	2013	2014
WDF Ranked televised events
World Masters	1R	1R	DNQ
PDC Non-ranked televised events
World Cup of Darts	DNQ		2R
