= Sajwani =

Sajwani is a surname. Notable people with the surname include:

- Hussain Sajwani (born 1953), Emirati billionaire property developer
- Peter Sajwani (born 1977), Swedish darts player

== See also ==
- Sajwan
