= Dennis Nilsson =

Swedish darts player (born 1976)

Personal information
- Nickname: "Strongman"
- Born: 21 March 1976 (age 50) Vålberg, Sweden

Sport
- Sport: Darts
- Darts: 24g Superdarts
- Laterality: Right-handed
- Walk-on music: "Heaven's on Fire" by Kiss

Organisation (see split in darts)
- BDO: 2006–2018
- PDC: 2018–
- WDF: 2006–2018, 2022–

WDF major events – best performances
- World Championship: Semi-final: 2023
- World Masters: Last 16: 2013
- World Trophy: Last 32: 2017

PDC premier events – best performances
- World Championship: Last 72: 2012

Other tournament wins
- Years
Baltic Cup Open	2016
Estonia Open	2025
Finnish Masters	2016
Lithuania Open	2017
Riga Open	2022
Sweden Championship	2011
PDC Challenge Tour	2018
PDCNB Pro Tour	2019, 2022
Medal record
Men's Darts
Representing Sweden
WDF World Cup
Bronze medal – third place	2011 Castlebar	Men's team
Bronze medal – third place	2013 St. Johns	Men's team
Bronze medal – third place	2023 Esbjerg	Men's team
Bronze medal – third place	2025 Seoul	Men's team
WDF Europe Cup
Bronze medal – third place	2010 Kemer	Men's team
Bronze medal – third place	2022 Gandía	Men's team

Dennis Nilsson (born 21 March 1976) is a Swedish professional darts player who competes in both World Darts Federation (WDF) and Professional Darts Corporation (PDC) events and formerly participated in British Darts Organisation (BDO) tournaments. He has participated in five Lakeside World Championships (two BDO and three World Darts Federation (WDF), reaching the semi-finals in 2023. He has represented Sweden at the PDC World Cup as well as the WDF World Cup and WDF Europe Cup. He has won a total of six bronze medals in the WDF team competitions.

In the past, he competed as a strongman, hence his nickname "Strongman".

== Career ==
Nilsson qualified for the 2012 PDC World Darts Championship, where he lost 4–2 to Japan's Haruki Muramatsu in the preliminary round. He represented Sweden with Magnus Caris in the 2012 PDC World Cup of Darts and together they were beaten 3–1 by Belgium in the second round, having defeated Japan in round one. He progressed through to the last 16 of the 2013 World Masters and was defeated 3–0 by Danny Noppert. A win over Steve Lennon saw Nilsson claim the 2016 Finnish Masters.

== World Championship results ==
=== PDC ===
- 2012: Preliminary round (lost to Haruki Muramatsu 2–4) (legs)

=== BDO ===
- 2017: Preliminary round (lost to Ryan Joyce 0–3)
- 2018: First round (lost to Jim Williams 2–3)

=== WDF ===
- 2023: Semi-finals (lost to Andy Baetens 2–5)
- 2024: Second round (lost to Gary Stone 2–3)
- 2025: Second roud (lost to James Beeton 2–3)
