= Slovak Open (darts) =

Tournament information
- Venue: x-bionic® sphere
- Location: Šamorín
- Country: Slovakia
- Established: 2018
- Organisation(s): WDF
- Format: Legs
- Prize fund: €8,000
- Month(s) Played: February

Current champion(s)
- Benjamin Pratnemer (men's); Jitka Císařová (women's)

The Slovak Open is a darts tournament that has been held in Šamorín since 2018.

== Results ==
=== Men's ===
Year	Champion	Av.	Score	Runner-Up	Av.	Prize Money			Venue
Year	Champion	Av.	Score	Runner-Up	Av.	Total	Ch.	R.-Up	Venue
2018	Scott Waites	81.55	6 – 3	(Wales) Martin Phillips	78.33	€8,400	€2,000	€1,000	x-bionic® sphere, Šamorín
2019	Wesley Harms	87.42	6 – 5	Adam Smith-Neale	82.81	€8,400	€2,000	€1,000	x-bionic® sphere, Šamorín
2020	Chris Landman	86.75	6 – 1	Sebastian Steyer	75.92	€8,000	€2,000	€1,000	x-bionic® sphere, Šamorín
2022	László Kádár	85.68	5 – 4	Scott Marsh	84.24	€5,600	€1,600	€800	x-bionic® sphere, Šamorín
2023	Liam Maendl-Lawrance	96.69	5 – 4	Andy Baetens	93.00	€6,400	€1,600	€800	x-bionic® sphere, Šamorín
2024	Benjamin Pratnemer	–	5 – 4	László Kádár	–	€6,420	€1,800	€900	x-bionic® sphere, Šamorín
2025	Benjamin Pratnemer (2)	82.83	5 – 1	Nick Fullwell	75.11	€6,420	€1,800	€900	x-bionic® sphere, Šamorín

=== Women's ===
Year	Champion	Av.	Score	Runner-Up	Av.	Prize Money			Venue
Year	Champion	Av.	Score	Runner-Up	Av.	Total	Ch.	R.-Up	Venue
2018	(England) Fallon Sherrock	79.95	5 – 0	(England) Danielle Ashton	59.33	€2,300	€800	€400	x-bionic® sphere, Šamorín
2019	(England) Maria O'Brien	85.06	5 – 2	(England) Lisa Ashton	78.53	€2,300	€800	€400	x-bionic® sphere, Šamorín
2020	(England) Lorraine Winstanley	–	5 – 4	(England) Laura Turner	–	€2,300	€800	€400	x-bionic® sphere, Šamorín
2022	Jo Clements	64.92	5 – 2	Suzanne Smith	61.55	€2,400	€800	€400	x-bionic® sphere, Šamorín
2023	Irina Armstrong	60.33	5 – 1	Jitka Císařová	54.21	€1,600	€350	€250	x-bionic® sphere, Šamorín
2024	Paige Pauling	–	5 – 0	(Slovakia) Martina Sulovska	–	€1,600	€500	€250	x-bionic® sphere, Šamorín
2025	Jitka Císařová	76.87	5 – 4	Gréta Tekauer	70.42	€1,600	€500	€250	x-bionic® sphere, Šamorín

=== Boys ===
Year	Champion	Av.	Score	Runner-Up	Av.						
Year	Champion	Av.	Score	Runner-Up	Av.	2018	(Hungary) Bence Katona	n/a	beat	(Austria) Marcel Steinacher	n/a
2019	(England) James Beeton	n/a	beat	(Czech Republic) Vilém Šedivý	n/a						
2020	(England) James Beeton (2)	n/a	beat	(Hungary) Péter Gévai	n/a						
2022	(Hungary) Rajmund Papp	79.86	4 – 2	(Czech Republic) Ondřej Skalický	73.10						
2023	András Borbély	81.24	4 – 0	(Hungary) Zsombor Baranyi	65.25						
2024	(Hungary) Csongor Onodi	n/a	4 - 0	(Czech Republic) Matyáš Rejhon	n/a						
2025	Florian Preis	n/a	4 - 1	Piotr Chochol							

=== Girls ===
Year	Champion	Av.	Score	Runner-Up	Av.	Venue							
Year	Champion	Av.	Score	Runner-Up	Av.	Venue	2019	(Czech Republic) Denisa Feklova	n/a	beat	(Slovakia) Veronika Krchova	n/a	x-bionic® sphere, Šamorín
2020	Ksenia Klochek	n/a	beat	Tamara Kovács	n/a								x-bionic® sphere, Šamorín
2022	(Slovakia) Michaela Jamnicka	n/a	3 – 0	(Slovakia) Vanessa Jozafova	n/a								x-bionic® sphere, Šamorín
2023	Paige Pauling	n/a	3 – 0	Sophie McKinlay	n/a								x-bionic® sphere, Šamorín
2024	Paige Pauling (2)	n/a	4 - 0	Krisztina Turai	n/a								
2025	Paige Pauling (3)	n/a	4 - 1	(Slovakia) Bibiana Bugyiova	n/a								
