= 2014 PDC World Cup of Darts =

Tournament information
- Dates: 6–8 June 2014
- Venue: Alsterdorfer Sporthalle
- Location: Hamburg
- Country: Germany
- Organisation(s): PDC
- Format: Legs
- Prize fund: £200,000
- Winner's share: £40,000
- High checkout: 167 (England) Phil Taylor (quarter-finals)

Champion(s)
- Netherlands (Michael van Gerwen and Raymond van Barneveld)

The 2014 PDC World Cup of Darts, known as the 2014 bwin World Cup of Darts for sponsorship reasons, was the fourth edition of the PDC World Cup of Darts which took place between 6–8 June 2014 at the Alsterdorfer Sporthalle in Hamburg, Germany.

The Netherlands pairing of Michael van Gerwen and Raymond van Barneveld won their country's second World Cup title by defeating defending champions Phil Taylor and Adrian Lewis of England 3–0 in the final.

The Netherlands averaged the third highest television average of 117.88 against Northern Ireland in their semi-final doubles match, the highest ever televised doubles average.

== Format ==
The tournament was expanded from 24 nations to 32 this year. 16 teams were seeded and were drawn to face the remaining 16 teams in the first round. Unlike in previous years, there are no groups this year with the tournament being a straight knockout.

First round: Best of nine legs doubles.
Second round, quarter and semi-finals: Two best of seven legs singles matches. If the scores are tied, a best of seven legs doubles match settled the tie.
Final: Up to the four best of seven legs singles matches. First team to 3 points wins the title. Should the tie be 2–2, then a fifth and final doubles tie will be played.

== Prize money ==
Prize money is per team:

Position (no. of teams)		Prize money (Total: £200,000)
Winners	(1)	£40,000
Runners-Up	(1)	£20,000
Semi-finalists	(2)	£14,000
Quarter-finalists	(4)	£7,000
Last 16 (second round)	(8)	£4,500
Last 32 (first round)	(16)	£3,000

== Teams and seeding ==
In a change to recent years, the top 16 teams were seeded, while the other 16 teams were unseeded.

With there now being 32 nations this year, many new nations entered. The new entrants were China, France, Hong Kong, India, Norway, Singapore and Thailand. Russia also returned after missing the last two events, and Malaysia also returned after missing the 2013 event. 2013 quarter-finalists Croatia didn't return.

Seeded nations

Rank	Country	Top two ranked players
1	England	Phil Taylor and Adrian Lewis
2	Netherlands	Michael van Gerwen and Raymond van Barneveld
3	Scotland	Peter Wright and Robert Thornton
4	Australia	Simon Whitlock and Paul Nicholson
5	Wales	Mark Webster and Richie Burnett
6	Northern Ireland	Brendan Dolan and Mickey Mansell
7	Belgium	Kim Huybrechts and Ronny Huybrechts
8	Ireland	Connie Finnan and William O'Connor
9	Germany	Jyhan Artut and Andree Welge
10	Austria	Mensur Suljović and Rowby-John Rodriguez
11	Canada	John Part and Shaun Narain
12	Finland	Jarkko Komula and Jani Haavisto
13	Hong Kong	Royden Lam and Scott MacKenzie
14	Sweden	Magnus Caris and Peter Sajwani
15	Spain	Antonio Alcinas and Carlos Rodríguez
16	United States	Darin Young and Larry Butler

Unseeded nations

Country	Top two ranked players
China	Yin Deng and Jun Cai
Denmark	Per Laursen and Dennis Lindskjold
France	Jacques Labre and Lionel Maranhao
Gibraltar	Dylan Duo and Dyson Parody
Hungary	Zsolt Mészáros and Nándor Bezzeg
India	Amit Gilitwala and Nitin Kumar
Italy	Marco Brentegani and Daniele Petri
Japan	Morihiro Hashimoto and Haruki Muramatsu
Malaysia	Kesava Roa and Thomat Darus
New Zealand	Rob Szabo and Craig Caldwell
Norway	Robert Wagner and Vegar Elvevoll
Poland	Krzysztof Chmielewski and Krzysztof Stróżyk
Russia	Evgenii Zhukov and Evgenii Izotov
Singapore	Paul Lim and Harith Lim
South Africa	Devon Petersen and Graham Filby
Thailand	Thanawat Yong and Watanyu Charoonroj

== Results ==
=== Draw ===
First round (best of 9 legs); 6 June
1	England 91.65	5
Thailand 80.85	0
16	United States 94.15	5
Hungary 77.04	1
8	Ireland 82.44	3
Singapore 86.04	5
9	Germany 82.94	3
South Africa 97.40	5
5	Wales 82.33	5
France 71.23	4
12	Finland 81.30	4
Poland 83.48	5
4	Australia 87.98	5
Denmark 85.13	2
13	Hong Kong 84.98	5
Norway 84.57	2
2	Netherlands 85.03	5
Italy 75.05	2
15	Spain 82.40	5
New Zealand 79.97	3
7	Belgium 91.65	5
India 69.96	0
10	Austria 70.79	5
China 63.78	2
6	Northern Ireland 97.14	5
Malaysia 73.16	2
11	Canada 78.57	4
Japan 77.33	5
3	Scotland 87.82	5
Russia 76.15	1
14	Sweden 75.89	5
Gibraltar 76.49	2

Second round (best of 3 sets); 7 June
1	England	4	1	4	2
16	United States	1	4	1	1
Singapore	0	4	3	1
South Africa	4	3	4	2
5	Wales	3	4	4	2
Poland	4	2	3	1
4	Australia	4	1	4	2
13	Hong Kong	2	4	0	1
2	Netherlands	4	4	2
15	Spain	1	1	0
7	Belgium	4	4	2
10	Austria	1	0	0
6	Northern Ireland	4	4	2
Japan	1	2	0
3	Scotland	4	4	2
14	Sweden	0	1	0

Quarter-finals (best of 3 sets); 8 June
1	England	4	4	2
South Africa	3	2	0
5	Wales	1	4	0	1
4	Australia	4	2	4	2
2	Netherlands	2	4	4	2
7	Belgium	4	2	0	1
6	Northern Ireland	4	3	4	2
3	Scotland	2	4	1	1

Semi-finals (best of 3 sets); 8 June
1	England	4	2	4	2
4	Australia	1	4	0	1
2	Netherlands	3	4	4	2
6	Northern Ireland	4	0	0	1

Final (best of 5 sets); 8 June
1	England	0	0	2	0
2	Netherlands	4	4	4	3

=== Second round ===
Two best of seven legs singles matches. If the scores were tied, a best of seven legs doubles match settled the match.

England (1)	United States (16)	Score
Phil Taylor 96.24	Larry Butler 93.33	4–1
Adrian Lewis 90.44	Darin Young 91.04	1–4
Taylor & Lewis 98.25	Butler & Young 87.16	4–1
Final result		2–1

Singapore	South Africa	Score
Paul Lim 73.30	Devon Petersen 87.13	0–4
Harith Lim 77.26	Graham Filby 73.74	4–3
P. Lim & H. Lim 86.07	Petersen & Filby 92.65	3–4
Final result		1–2

Wales (5)	Poland	Score
Mark Webster 74.44	Krzysztof Chmielewski 85.90	3–4
Richie Burnett 89.12	Krzysztof Stróżyk 84.16	4–2
Webster & Burnett 82.77	Chmielewski & Strozyk 90.58	4–3
Final result		2–1

Australia (4)	Hong Kong (13)	Score
Simon Whitlock 96.40	Royden Lam 92.90	4–2
Paul Nicholson 91.46	Scott MacKenzie 97.52	1–4
Whitlock & Nicholson 82.35	Lam & MacKenzie 78.33	4–0
Final result		2–1

Netherlands (2)	Spain (15)	Score
Michael van Gerwen 103.71	Toni Alcinas 82.80	4–1
Raymond van Barneveld 88.52	Carlos Rodríguez 86.23	4–1
Final result		2–0

Belgium (7)	Austria (10)	Score
Kim Huybrechts 105.17	Mensur Suljović 84.96	4–1
Ronny Huybrechts 92.49	Rowby-John Rodriguez 68.57	4–0
Final result		2–0

Northern Ireland (6)	Japan	Score
Mickey Mansell 83.60	Haruki Muramatsu 78.53	4–1
Brendan Dolan 90.49	Morihiro Hashimoto 79.58	4–2
Final result		2–0

Scotland (3)	Sweden (14)	Score
Peter Wright 92.49	Magnus Caris 77.29	4–0
Robert Thornton 78.95	Peter Sajwani 76.15	4–1
Final result		2–0

=== Quarter-finals ===
Two best of seven legs singles matches. If the scores were tied, a best of seven legs doubles match settled the match.

England (1)	South Africa	Score
Phil Taylor 98.76	Devon Petersen 92.37	4–3
Adrian Lewis 97.74	Graham Filby 85.85	4–2
Final result		2–0

Wales (5)	Australia (4)	Score
Mark Webster 85.30	Simon Whitlock 100.34	1–4
Richie Burnett 99.38	Paul Nicholson 87.59	4–2
Webster & Burnett 73.14	Whitlock & Nicholson 87.13	0–4
Final result		1–2

Netherlands (2)	Belgium (7)	Score
Michael van Gerwen 100.33	Kim Huybrechts 106.76	2–4
Raymond van Barneveld 89.84	Ronny Huybrechts 90.00	4–2
van Gerwen & van Barneveld 91.09	K. Huybrechts & R. Huybrechts 85.24	4–0
Final result		2–1

Northern Ireland (6)	Scotland (3)	Score
Brendan Dolan 94.90	Peter Wright 95.17	4–2
Mickey Mansell 94.99	Robert Thornton 107.97	3–4
Dolan & Mansell 93.76	Wright & Thornton 89.56	4–1
Final result		2–1

=== Semi-finals ===
Two best of seven legs singles matches. If the scores were tied, a best of seven legs doubles match settled the match.

England (1)	Australia (4)	Score
Phil Taylor 94.82	Simon Whitlock 84.58	4–1
Adrian Lewis 83.00	Paul Nicholson 86.90	2–4
Taylor & Lewis 92.49	Whitlock & Nicholson 80.15	4–0
Final result		2–1

Netherlands (2)	Northern Ireland (6)	Score
Michael van Gerwen 98.75	Brendan Dolan 99.46	3–4
Raymond van Barneveld 92.49	Mickey Mansell 78.24	4–0
van Gerwen & van Barneveld 117.88	Dolan & Mansell 95.19	4–0
Final result		2–1

=== Final ===
Three match wins were needed to win the title. Two best of seven legs singles matches were played, followed by reverse singles matches. If the score had been level after that, a best of seven legs doubles match would have been played to determine the champion.

England (1)	Netherlands (2)	Score
Phil Taylor 93.89	Michael van Gerwen 103.66	0–4
Adrian Lewis 76.91	Raymond van Barneveld 85.89	0–4
Adrian Lewis 95.13	Michael van Gerwen 97.25	2–4
Final result		0–3
