= Krasimir Ivanov =

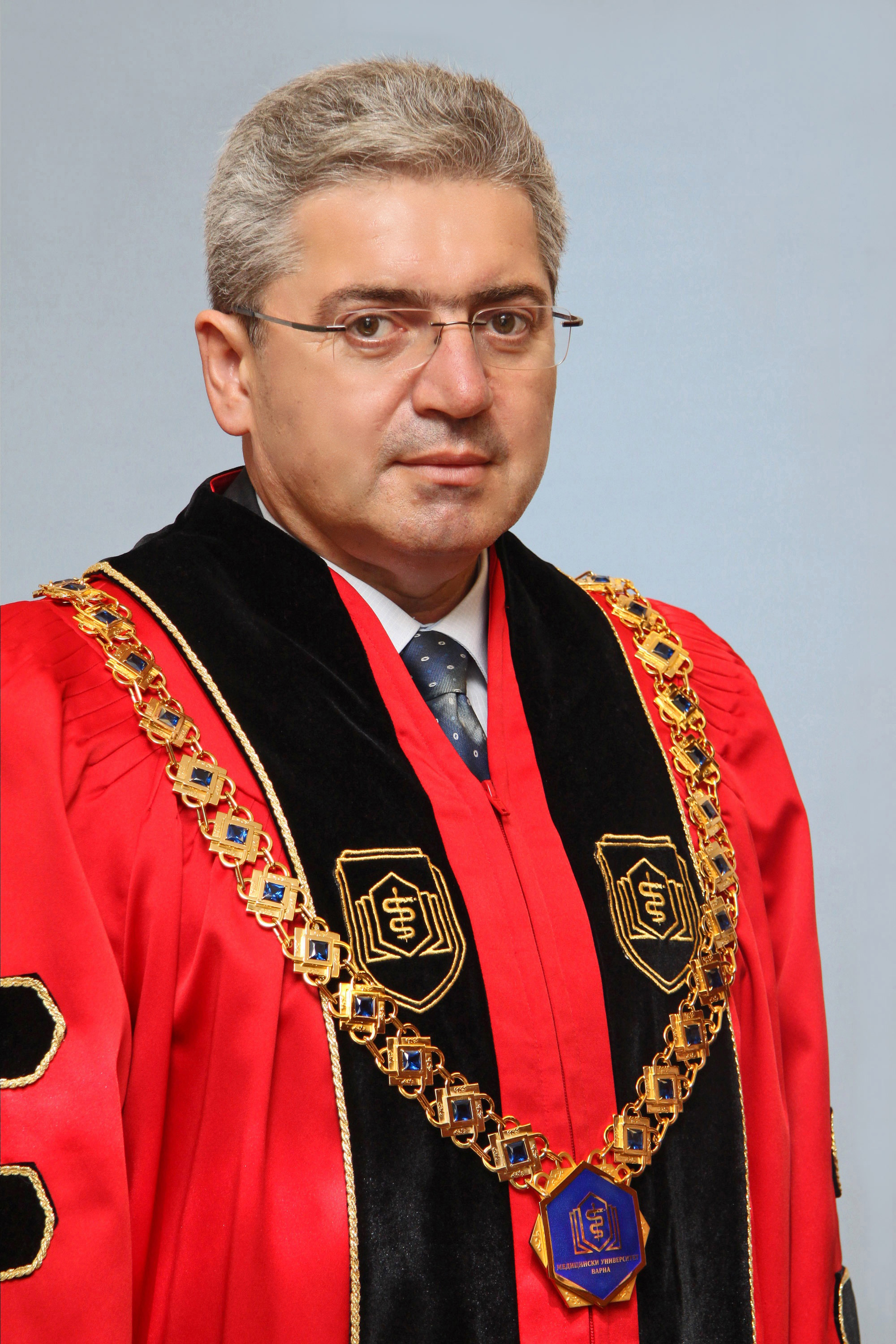
- Bulgarian surgeon and oncologist
- Born: 10 March 1960 (age 66); Varna, Bulgaria

Krasimir Dimitrov Ivanov is a Bulgarian surgeon and oncologist, professor and rector of the Medical University "Prof. Dr. Paraskev Stoyanov" of Varna in the period 2012–2020. In the past, he was the executive director of St. Marina University Hospital of Varna (until 2010).

== Biography ==
Krasimir Ivanov was born in Varna on March 10, 1960. He graduated from the Medical University of Varna. He specialised in surgery and oncology, gaining scientific degrees of Doctor (PhD), Doctor of Medical Sciences (DSc), along with an MS degree in economic management. In 2002, he earned the scientific degree of Associate Professor and, in 2009, was elected as a professor at the Department of General and Operative Surgery, Anaesthesia and Intensive Care, Medical University of Varna. He was head of the department until his election as rector of the Medical University of Varna.

During the period 2001 – 2010, Krasimir Ivanov held the position of executive director of St. Marina University Hospital of Varna; since 2010, he has occupied the position of chairman of the board of directors. He is a National Consultant in surgery (2012).

Prof. Krasimir Ivanov is the 12th rector of the Medical University of Varna (first term in office started on March 19, 2012; second term in office started on March 14, 2016). During his term in office, the university has expanded with new affiliates, developed its structure with new research institutions and centres during his term in office.

In 2020 he became President of the General Assembly of the Medical University of Varna.

In May 2020, he was elected as the Chair of the Association of University Hospitals in Bulgaria (AUHRB).

== Career and research ==
He is a specialist in visceral surgery, professor in abdominal surgery, practising surgeon-oncologist, an authority in rectal carcinoma diagnostics, and an expert in economic management. His research activities are focused on benign and malignant conditions of the gastrointestinal tract (surgical oncology), laparoscopic (or minimally invasive) surgery, telemedicine and telesurgery (surgical robotics). In 1996, he pioneered a new approach to rectal carcinoma diagnostics, i.e. three-dimensional evaluation of endorectal ultrasound by means of newly created software later implemented in the ultrasound.

His academic career as a professor involves tutoring students, nurses and postgraduates, as well as research supervision of PhD students who pursue further in their scientific and professional calling. He is fluent in English and Russian. His research activities are represented by more than 350 publications; he is the author of textbooks and surgery manuals; Editor-in-Chief of the scholarly medical journals Scripta Scientifica Medica and Varna Medical Forum, a member of the editorial boards of Surgery journal (Sofia) and the World Journal of Gastrointestinal Surgery (until 2017), as well as an editor of Biomedical Reviews.

== Memberships, awards and honours ==
- Member of: IASGO - International Association of Surgeons, Gastroenterologists, and Oncologists; ISUCRS – International Society of University Colon and Rectal Surgeons; Bulgarian Surgical Society; Bulgarian Medical Association, and the Union of Scientists in Bulgaria.
- On 15.08.2020 he was conferred the title Honorary Citizen of Varna for his indisputable and long-term efforts, and the outstanding results achieved in the development of healthcare and medical education in the Sea Capital.
- On 22.06.2020, with a presidential decree, he was awarded the Order of St. Cyril and Methodius - Pendant for his contribution to the medical science and education in the Republic of Bulgaria.
- In March 2020, he was awarded the order of St. Andrew the First-Called by Yoan (John), the Varna and Veliki Preslav Metropolitan, for his contribution to the Varna and Veliki Preslav eparchy.
- Awarded the academic title Doctor Honoris Causa of the Nikola Vaptsarov Naval Academy for establishing the Military Doctor program, a mutual program between the Naval Academy, Medical University of Varna, and Military Medical Academy (May 5, 2019).
- His honours also include: Honorary Member of the German Society of Surgery in Munich for achievements in Colorectal and Minimally Invasive Surgery, and owing to his scientific work and achievements in the building up and development of the Medical School at the Varna Medical University, and the education of hundreds of German students (2019); Honorary citizen of the city of Sliven for significant contribution to its development (2017); the Shumen Award for Person of the Year for his contribution to enhancing the academic institutions in the city (2017); the statue of Lesses Capra of the Bulgarian Association of Healthcare Professionals for his contribution to higher education (2017); Honorary Golden Sign "For Merits to Varna" (2015) for his contribution to the development of science and medicine; twice the winner of the Varna Award - in 2006 (with a team of physicians from St. Marina University Hospital) and in 2010 (for the start-up of the Department of Living-Donor Transplantation); the Bulgarian Surgical Society Award (2008); Honorary member of the Romanian Society of Surgery, June 2008; the Bulgarian Physician honorary sign; golden badge for special merits in the development of minimally invasive surgery; Manager of the Year Award by Forum Medicus.
