= Sajwan Nagar =

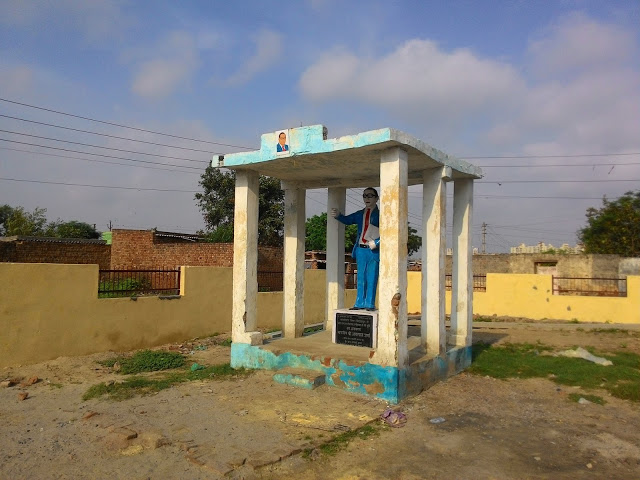
- Hindon River, Ghaziabad NH 24
- Nickname: Gate Way of Uttar Pradesh
- Location within India Location within Uttar Pradesh
- Coordinates: 28.67°N 77.42°E
- Country: India
- State: Uttar Pradesh
- District: Ghaziabad District
- Established: 1740
- Founder: Wazir Ghazi-ud-din

Government
  - Body: Municipal Corporation
- Demonym: Ghaziabad

Languages
  - Official: Hindi, Urdu, English, Punjabi
- Time zone: UTC+5:30 (IST)
- PIN: 201009
- Telephone code: 91-120
- Vehicle registration: UP-14
- Website: ghaziabad.nic.in

Sajwan Nagar is a village in the Ghaziabad district of Uttar Pradesh, India. It was established in 1989. The village is one of Ghaziabad's oldest villages.
