= Jennifer Mullan =

American author and mental health practitioner (born 1978)

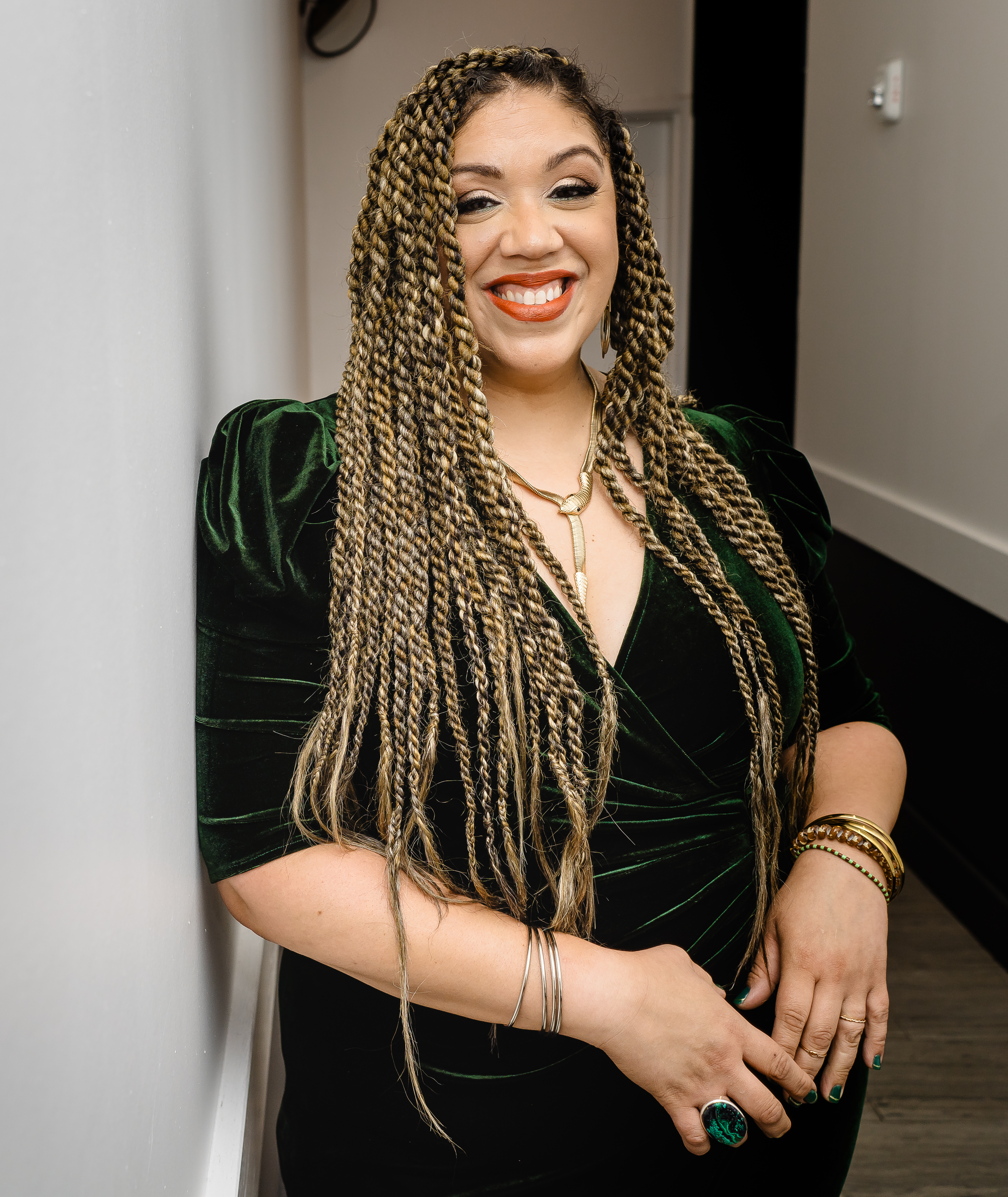
- Born: July 1978 (age 48); New Jersey, U.S.
- Citizenship: American
- Education: California Institute of Integral Studies (PsyD)
- Occupations: Author; psychologist
- Notable work: Decolonizing Therapy (2023)
- Website: drjennifermullan.com

Jennifer L. Mullan (born July 1978) is an American author and mental health practitioner known for founding Decolonizing Therapy, an approach to mental health care that critiques Western psychology and incorporates historical, ancestral, and sociopolitical context. Trained as a clinical psychologist, she is the author of Decolonizing Therapy: Oppression, Historical Trauma, and Politicizing Your Practice (2023), published by W. W. Norton & Company. She has been called "the Rage Doctor."

== Early life and education ==
Mullan is a native of New Jersey. She earned a doctorate in clinical psychology at the California Institute of Integral Studies. She has described herself as a multiracial, Black-identified woman of Panamanian, Irish, Italian, and Indigenous descent.

== Career ==
Mullan worked for more than two decades as a clinical psychologist, including as a counselor at New Jersey City University. In 2017, she began publishing under the name Decolonizing Therapy on Instagram. By 2020, the account had reached roughly 100,000 followers. During the COVID-19 pandemic and the 2020 racial justice protests, she was cited in national media discussing racial trauma and its psychological effects on Black Americans. She later stopped seeing patients to focus on public speaking and writing.

== Work ==
Mullan's approach, which she calls Decolonizing Therapy, holds that mainstream psychotherapy reflects Eurocentric assumptions and can retraumatize people from marginalized communities. It emphasizes historical and intergenerational trauma and situates individual distress within a broader social and political context. She has argued that conventional clinical training discourages therapists from engaging with clients' histories of racism and cultural trauma. Her work has been referenced in academic writing on decolonial approaches to counselling psychology.

== Books ==
Decolonizing Therapy: Oppression, Historical Trauma, and Politicizing Your Practice was published by W. W. Norton & Company in November 2023. In a review for the Mental Health Commission of Canada's Catalyst, Simon Gardner described the book as a wide-ranging critique of the mental health system, distinguished by its "feisty, passionate, and challenging voice." A second book, Sacred Rage, has been announced as forthcoming.

== Recognition ==
In 2020, Mullan received Essence magazine's Essential Hero Award in the mental health category.

== Personal life ==
Mullan lives in Montclair, New Jersey.
