= Daniel Zygla =

German darts player

Personal information
- Nickname: "The Flame"
- Born: 24 April 1990 (age 36) Stade, Germany
- Home town: Harsefeld, Germany

Sport
- Sport: Darts
- Playing since: 2005
- Darts: 24 Gram One80 Signature
- Laterality: Right-handed
- Walk-on music: "Kiss" by Tom Jones

Organisation (see split in darts)
- BDO: 2008–2017, 2019–2020
- PDC: 2023
- WDF: 2019-

WDF major events – best performances
- World Masters: Last 32: 2022

Other tournament wins
- Tournament: Years
- Sylt Classic Dinslaken Open Kirchheim Classic Kirchheim Open: 2019; 2017; 2016; 2016

Daniel Zygla (born 24 April 1990) is a German former professional darts player who played in British Darts Organisation (BDO) events.

Since 2016, he has won three regional tournaments in Germany: the Kirchheim Classic and the Kirchheim Open in 2016, and the Dinslaken Open in 2017.

In 2023, Zygla attended EU Q-School, however failed to win a PDC Tour Card, instead competing on the Challenge Tour.
