= Vålberg =

- Location within Sweden
- Coordinates: 59°24′N 13°10′E
- Country: Sweden
- Province: Värmland
- County: Värmland County
- Municipality: Karlstad Municipality

Area
  - Total: 3.86 km^{2} (1.49 sq mi)

Population (31 December 2010)
  - Total: 2,770
  - Density: 718/km^{2} (1,860/sq mi)
- Time zone: UTC+1 (CET)
  - Summer (DST): UTC+2 (CEST)

Vålberg is a locality situated in Karlstad Municipality, Värmland County, Sweden with 2,770 inhabitants in 2010.
