= Dylan Duo =

Gibraltarian darts player (born 1977)

Personal information
- Full name: Dylan Duo Sr
- Nickname: "The Rock"
- Born: 24 November 1977 (age 48) Gibraltar
- Home town: Gibraltar

Sport
- Sport: Darts
- Playing since: 1995
- Darts: 22 Gram Bull's Signature
- Laterality: Right-handed
- Walk-on music: "We Will Rock You" by Queen

Organisation (see split in darts)
- BDO: 2000–2008
- PDC: 2008–2020

WDF major events – best performances
- World Masters: Last 128: 2005, 2006, 2017

PDC premier events – best performances
- World Championship: Last 64: 2010
- UK Open: Last 64: 2010

Other tournament wins
- Years
GDA College Cosmos Open	2012
GDA Dave Obee Singles	2010
GDA Diamond Jubilee Superstars	2012
GDA Invitation Trophy	2012
GDA Joe Goldwin Classic	2010
GDA John Smiths Singles	2010
GDA Johnny Neale Charity Singles	2011, 2012
GDA Masters Singles	2010
GDA Millenium Singles	2009
GDA Willie Duo Singles	2012
Gibraltar National Championships	2008, 2012
Torremolinos Open	2008

Dylan Duo (born 24 November 1977) is a Gibraltarian professional darts player who has played in Professional Darts Corporation (PDC) events.

== Career ==
Duo qualified for the 2010 PDC World Darts Championship via the European Order of Merit. He became the first darts player from Gibraltar to qualify for either version of the World Darts Championship. In the first round, he was whitewashed 3–0 by Vincent van der Voort.

He played for and captained the College 501 team in the Gibraltar Darts Association league. In the 2009/10 season he achieved a first by winning all four major domestic ranking tournaments. He served several years as Treasurer of the Gibraltar Darts Association.

Duo represented Gibraltar with Dyson Parody in the 2012 PDC World Cup of Darts and together they were beaten 5–4 by Denmark in the first round, with Duo missing two darts for the match. During the rest of 2012 he won six tournaments on the Gibraltar Darts Association tour.

In January 2013, Duo entered Q School in an attempt to win a two-year PDC Tour Card and was one match away from doing so on the fourth and final day, but lost to Steve Coote 6–0. Duo played in his third World Cup of Darts with Dyson Parody in February, but they finished bottom of Group E after losing 5–2 to Poland and 5–0 to the Netherlands. In June he qualified for the Gibraltar Darts Trophy but was thrashed 6–0 by Gary Anderson in the first round. In the final of the Iberian qualifier for the 2014 World Championship, Duo was narrowly beaten 10–9 by Julio Barbero.

At the 2014 World Cup of Darts, Duo and Parody were beaten 5–2 by Sweden in the opening round.

In August 2015, Dylan Duo was disciplined by the Darts Regulation Authority for "Threatening behaviour and failure to mark" at the Gibraltar Qualifier for the PDC World Cup. He was fined £350.

At the 2017 World Cup, Duo and Parody lost 5–2 to England in the opening round.

Duo quit the PDC in January 2020.

== World Championship results ==
=== PDC ===
- 2010: First round (lost to Vincent van der Voort 0–3) (sets)
