= Peter Sajwani =

Swedish darts player

Personal information
- Nickname: "Chatterbox"
- Born: 27 May 1977 (age 49) Las Palmas, Spain
- Home town: Stockholm, Sweden

Sport
- Sport: Darts
- Playing since: 1990
- Laterality: Right-handed
- Walk-on music: "I Want It All" by Queen

Organisation (see split in darts)
- BDO: 2010-2017

WDF major events – best performances
- World Championship: Last 16: 2015
- World Masters: Last 80: 2012, 2014
- World Trophy: Last 32: 2015

Other tournament wins
- Tournament: Years
- Estonian Open Iceland Open Torremolinos Open: 2016, 2017; 2017; 2014

Peter Sajwani (born 27 May 1977) is a Swedish former darts player. He was born in Las Palmas, Spain, to an Indian father and a Swedish mother.

== Career ==
Sajwani won the 2014 Torremolinos Open, beating John Roberts in the final 4–1. In June 2014, he competed in the 2014 PDC World Cup of Darts with his playing partner Magnus Caris; they both lost their singles games in the second round against Scotland's Peter Wright and Robert Thornton to exit the tournament. He qualified for the 2015 BDO World Darts Championship, where he played Sam Head in the Preliminary round, winning 3–0. In the First Round, he played the number one seed James Wilson, winning 3–1. He played Robbie Green in the Second round, but lost 4-0.

== World Championship results ==
=== BDO ===
- 2015: 2nd Round (lost to Robbie Green 0-4)
- 2016: 1st Round (lost to Mark McGeeney 0-3)
