= Oliver Ferenc =

Serbian darts player (born 1969)

Personal information
- Full name: Oliver Ferenc
- Nickname: "Oli"
- Born: 5 November 1969 (age 56) Apatin, SR Serbia, SFR Yugoslavia
- Home town: Apatin, Serbia

Sport
- Sport: Darts
- Playing since: 1990
- Darts: 20 g
- Laterality: Right-handed

Organisation (see split in darts)
- BDO: 2018–2020
- PDC: 2010–2018
- WDF: 2018–

WDF major events – best performances
- World Championship: Last 32: 2019

PDC premier events – best performances
- World Championship: Last 72: 2012

Other tournament wins
- Years
Apatin Open	2007, 2008
Hungarian Masters	2017
PDC World Qualifying	2011
Medal record
Men's Darts
Representing Serbia
EDU European Ch'ship
Bronze medal – third place	2007 Prague	Men's singles

Oliver Ferenc (born 5 November 1969) is a Serbian professional darts player who has competed in events organised by the World Darts Federation (WDF), Professional Darts Corporation (PDC) and British Darts Organisation (BDO).

== Career ==
Ferenc began playing darts competitively in 1990. He qualified for the 2012 PDC World Darts Championship by winning the South-East Europe qualifier. He was defeated 4–2 by Joe Cullen in the preliminary round.

At the 2012 Hungarian Open Ferenc reached the final, finishing runner-up to Dave Prins. He was also runner-up at the 2015 FCD Anniversary Open, losing to Kevin Simm in the final.

Ferenc has represented Serbia in regional and European competitions, and won a bronze medal in the men's singles at the 2007 EDF/EDU European Championship in Prague. He has played as a right-handed thrower using 20 g darts and uses the nickname "Oli" on the circuit.

== World Championship results ==
=== PDC ===
- 2012: Preliminary round (lost to Joe Cullen 2–4) (legs)

=== BDO ===
- 2019: First round (lost to Scott Mitchell 0–3)
