= 2019 Grand Slam of Darts =

2019 BoyleSports Grand Slam of Darts

Tournament information
- Dates: 9–17 November 2019
- Venue: Aldersley Leisure Village
- Location: Aldersley, Wolverhampton
- Country: England
- Organisation(s): PDC
- Format: Legs
- Prize fund: £550,000
- Winner's share: £125,000
- High checkout: 167 (Republic of Ireland) Steve Lennon (group stage)

Champion(s)
- (Wales) Gerwyn Price

The 2019 BoyleSports Grand Slam of Darts was the thirteenth staging of the tournament, organised by the Professional Darts Corporation. The event took place from 9–17 November 2019 in Wolverhampton, England, and like in 2018, it took place at Aldersley Leisure Village.

The tournament's defending champion was Gerwyn Price, who won his first PDC major title by defeating Gary Anderson 16–13, in a highly controversial final in 2018. Price successfully defended the title to win his second PDC major, beating Peter Wright 16–6 with the second highest average in a Grand Slam final.

== Prize money ==
The prize fund for the Grand Slam increased from £450,000 in 2018 to £550,000 this year, with the winner getting £125,000.

Position (no. of players)		Prize money (Total: £550,000)
Winner	(1)	£125,000
Runner-up	(1)	£65,000
Semi-finalists	(2)	£40,000
Quarter-finalists	(4)	£20,000
Last 16 (second round)	(8)	£10,000
Third in group	(8)	£7,500
Fourth in group	(8)	£4,000
Group winner bonus	(8)	£3,500

== Qualifying ==
=== PDC Qualifying Tournaments ===
PDC Main Tournaments
Tournament	Year	Position	Player	Qualifiers
PDC World Darts Championship	2019	Winner	(Netherlands) Michael van Gerwen	(Netherlands) Michael van Gerwen (Wales) Gerwyn Price (England) Rob Cross (Belgium) Dimitri Van den Bergh (England) Nathan Aspinall (Northern Ireland) Daryl Gurney (Scotland) Gary Anderson (Scotland) Peter Wright (England) Michael Smith (England) Dave Chisnall (Germany) Martin Schindler (England) James Wade (Netherlands) Danny Noppert (Republic of Ireland) Steve Lennon (Republic of Ireland) William O'Connor
Grand Slam of Darts	2018	Winner	(Wales) Gerwyn Price	(Netherlands) Michael van Gerwen (Wales) Gerwyn Price (England) Rob Cross (Belgium) Dimitri Van den Bergh (England) Nathan Aspinall (Northern Ireland) Daryl Gurney (Scotland) Gary Anderson (Scotland) Peter Wright (England) Michael Smith (England) Dave Chisnall (Germany) Martin Schindler (England) James Wade (Netherlands) Danny Noppert (Republic of Ireland) Steve Lennon (Republic of Ireland) William O'Connor
Premier League Darts	2019	Winner	(Netherlands) Michael van Gerwen	(Netherlands) Michael van Gerwen (Wales) Gerwyn Price (England) Rob Cross (Belgium) Dimitri Van den Bergh (England) Nathan Aspinall (Northern Ireland) Daryl Gurney (Scotland) Gary Anderson (Scotland) Peter Wright (England) Michael Smith (England) Dave Chisnall (Germany) Martin Schindler (England) James Wade (Netherlands) Danny Noppert (Republic of Ireland) Steve Lennon (Republic of Ireland) William O'Connor
World Matchplay	2019	Winner	(England) Rob Cross	(Netherlands) Michael van Gerwen (Wales) Gerwyn Price (England) Rob Cross (Belgium) Dimitri Van den Bergh (England) Nathan Aspinall (Northern Ireland) Daryl Gurney (Scotland) Gary Anderson (Scotland) Peter Wright (England) Michael Smith (England) Dave Chisnall (Germany) Martin Schindler (England) James Wade (Netherlands) Danny Noppert (Republic of Ireland) Steve Lennon (Republic of Ireland) William O'Connor
World Grand Prix	2019	Winner	(Netherlands) Michael van Gerwen	(Netherlands) Michael van Gerwen (Wales) Gerwyn Price (England) Rob Cross (Belgium) Dimitri Van den Bergh (England) Nathan Aspinall (Northern Ireland) Daryl Gurney (Scotland) Gary Anderson (Scotland) Peter Wright (England) Michael Smith (England) Dave Chisnall (Germany) Martin Schindler (England) James Wade (Netherlands) Danny Noppert (Republic of Ireland) Steve Lennon (Republic of Ireland) William O'Connor
PDC World Youth Championship	2018	Winner	(Belgium) Dimitri Van den Bergh	(Netherlands) Michael van Gerwen (Wales) Gerwyn Price (England) Rob Cross (Belgium) Dimitri Van den Bergh (England) Nathan Aspinall (Northern Ireland) Daryl Gurney (Scotland) Gary Anderson (Scotland) Peter Wright (England) Michael Smith (England) Dave Chisnall (Germany) Martin Schindler (England) James Wade (Netherlands) Danny Noppert (Republic of Ireland) Steve Lennon (Republic of Ireland) William O'Connor
Masters	2019	Winner	(Netherlands) Michael van Gerwen	(Netherlands) Michael van Gerwen (Wales) Gerwyn Price (England) Rob Cross (Belgium) Dimitri Van den Bergh (England) Nathan Aspinall (Northern Ireland) Daryl Gurney (Scotland) Gary Anderson (Scotland) Peter Wright (England) Michael Smith (England) Dave Chisnall (Germany) Martin Schindler (England) James Wade (Netherlands) Danny Noppert (Republic of Ireland) Steve Lennon (Republic of Ireland) William O'Connor
UK Open	2019	Winner	(England) Nathan Aspinall	(Netherlands) Michael van Gerwen (Wales) Gerwyn Price (England) Rob Cross (Belgium) Dimitri Van den Bergh (England) Nathan Aspinall (Northern Ireland) Daryl Gurney (Scotland) Gary Anderson (Scotland) Peter Wright (England) Michael Smith (England) Dave Chisnall (Germany) Martin Schindler (England) James Wade (Netherlands) Danny Noppert (Republic of Ireland) Steve Lennon (Republic of Ireland) William O'Connor
European Championship	2019	Winner	(England) Rob Cross	(Netherlands) Michael van Gerwen (Wales) Gerwyn Price (England) Rob Cross (Belgium) Dimitri Van den Bergh (England) Nathan Aspinall (Northern Ireland) Daryl Gurney (Scotland) Gary Anderson (Scotland) Peter Wright (England) Michael Smith (England) Dave Chisnall (Germany) Martin Schindler (England) James Wade (Netherlands) Danny Noppert (Republic of Ireland) Steve Lennon (Republic of Ireland) William O'Connor
Players Championship Finals	2018	Winner	(Northern Ireland) Daryl Gurney	(Netherlands) Michael van Gerwen (Wales) Gerwyn Price (England) Rob Cross (Belgium) Dimitri Van den Bergh (England) Nathan Aspinall (Northern Ireland) Daryl Gurney (Scotland) Gary Anderson (Scotland) Peter Wright (England) Michael Smith (England) Dave Chisnall (Germany) Martin Schindler (England) James Wade (Netherlands) Danny Noppert (Republic of Ireland) Steve Lennon (Republic of Ireland) William O'Connor
Champions League of Darts	2019	Winner	(Netherlands) Michael van Gerwen	(Netherlands) Michael van Gerwen (Wales) Gerwyn Price (England) Rob Cross (Belgium) Dimitri Van den Bergh (England) Nathan Aspinall (Northern Ireland) Daryl Gurney (Scotland) Gary Anderson (Scotland) Peter Wright (England) Michael Smith (England) Dave Chisnall (Germany) Martin Schindler (England) James Wade (Netherlands) Danny Noppert (Republic of Ireland) Steve Lennon (Republic of Ireland) William O'Connor
World Series of Darts Finals	2019	Winner	(Netherlands) Michael van Gerwen	(Netherlands) Michael van Gerwen (Wales) Gerwyn Price (England) Rob Cross (Belgium) Dimitri Van den Bergh (England) Nathan Aspinall (Northern Ireland) Daryl Gurney (Scotland) Gary Anderson (Scotland) Peter Wright (England) Michael Smith (England) Dave Chisnall (Germany) Martin Schindler (England) James Wade (Netherlands) Danny Noppert (Republic of Ireland) Steve Lennon (Republic of Ireland) William O'Connor
PDC World Cup of Darts	2019	Winners	(Scotland) Gary Anderson (Scotland) Peter Wright	(Netherlands) Michael van Gerwen (Wales) Gerwyn Price (England) Rob Cross (Belgium) Dimitri Van den Bergh (England) Nathan Aspinall (Northern Ireland) Daryl Gurney (Scotland) Gary Anderson (Scotland) Peter Wright (England) Michael Smith (England) Dave Chisnall (Germany) Martin Schindler (England) James Wade (Netherlands) Danny Noppert (Republic of Ireland) Steve Lennon (Republic of Ireland) William O'Connor
PDC World Darts Championship	2019	Runner-up	(England) Michael Smith	(Netherlands) Michael van Gerwen (Wales) Gerwyn Price (England) Rob Cross (Belgium) Dimitri Van den Bergh (England) Nathan Aspinall (Northern Ireland) Daryl Gurney (Scotland) Gary Anderson (Scotland) Peter Wright (England) Michael Smith (England) Dave Chisnall (Germany) Martin Schindler (England) James Wade (Netherlands) Danny Noppert (Republic of Ireland) Steve Lennon (Republic of Ireland) William O'Connor
Grand Slam of Darts	2018	Runner-up	(Scotland) Gary Anderson	(Netherlands) Michael van Gerwen (Wales) Gerwyn Price (England) Rob Cross (Belgium) Dimitri Van den Bergh (England) Nathan Aspinall (Northern Ireland) Daryl Gurney (Scotland) Gary Anderson (Scotland) Peter Wright (England) Michael Smith (England) Dave Chisnall (Germany) Martin Schindler (England) James Wade (Netherlands) Danny Noppert (Republic of Ireland) Steve Lennon (Republic of Ireland) William O'Connor
Premier League Darts	2019	Runner-up	(England) Rob Cross	(Netherlands) Michael van Gerwen (Wales) Gerwyn Price (England) Rob Cross (Belgium) Dimitri Van den Bergh (England) Nathan Aspinall (Northern Ireland) Daryl Gurney (Scotland) Gary Anderson (Scotland) Peter Wright (England) Michael Smith (England) Dave Chisnall (Germany) Martin Schindler (England) James Wade (Netherlands) Danny Noppert (Republic of Ireland) Steve Lennon (Republic of Ireland) William O'Connor
World Matchplay	2019	Runner-up	(England) Michael Smith	(Netherlands) Michael van Gerwen (Wales) Gerwyn Price (England) Rob Cross (Belgium) Dimitri Van den Bergh (England) Nathan Aspinall (Northern Ireland) Daryl Gurney (Scotland) Gary Anderson (Scotland) Peter Wright (England) Michael Smith (England) Dave Chisnall (Germany) Martin Schindler (England) James Wade (Netherlands) Danny Noppert (Republic of Ireland) Steve Lennon (Republic of Ireland) William O'Connor
World Grand Prix	2019	Runner-up	(England) Dave Chisnall	(Netherlands) Michael van Gerwen (Wales) Gerwyn Price (England) Rob Cross (Belgium) Dimitri Van den Bergh (England) Nathan Aspinall (Northern Ireland) Daryl Gurney (Scotland) Gary Anderson (Scotland) Peter Wright (England) Michael Smith (England) Dave Chisnall (Germany) Martin Schindler (England) James Wade (Netherlands) Danny Noppert (Republic of Ireland) Steve Lennon (Republic of Ireland) William O'Connor
PDC World Youth Championship	2018	Runner-up	(Germany) Martin Schindler	(Netherlands) Michael van Gerwen (Wales) Gerwyn Price (England) Rob Cross (Belgium) Dimitri Van den Bergh (England) Nathan Aspinall (Northern Ireland) Daryl Gurney (Scotland) Gary Anderson (Scotland) Peter Wright (England) Michael Smith (England) Dave Chisnall (Germany) Martin Schindler (England) James Wade (Netherlands) Danny Noppert (Republic of Ireland) Steve Lennon (Republic of Ireland) William O'Connor
Masters	2019	Runner-up	(England) James Wade	(Netherlands) Michael van Gerwen (Wales) Gerwyn Price (England) Rob Cross (Belgium) Dimitri Van den Bergh (England) Nathan Aspinall (Northern Ireland) Daryl Gurney (Scotland) Gary Anderson (Scotland) Peter Wright (England) Michael Smith (England) Dave Chisnall (Germany) Martin Schindler (England) James Wade (Netherlands) Danny Noppert (Republic of Ireland) Steve Lennon (Republic of Ireland) William O'Connor
UK Open	2019	Runner-up	(England) Rob Cross	(Netherlands) Michael van Gerwen (Wales) Gerwyn Price (England) Rob Cross (Belgium) Dimitri Van den Bergh (England) Nathan Aspinall (Northern Ireland) Daryl Gurney (Scotland) Gary Anderson (Scotland) Peter Wright (England) Michael Smith (England) Dave Chisnall (Germany) Martin Schindler (England) James Wade (Netherlands) Danny Noppert (Republic of Ireland) Steve Lennon (Republic of Ireland) William O'Connor
European Championship	2019	Runner-up	(Wales) Gerwyn Price	(Netherlands) Michael van Gerwen (Wales) Gerwyn Price (England) Rob Cross (Belgium) Dimitri Van den Bergh (England) Nathan Aspinall (Northern Ireland) Daryl Gurney (Scotland) Gary Anderson (Scotland) Peter Wright (England) Michael Smith (England) Dave Chisnall (Germany) Martin Schindler (England) James Wade (Netherlands) Danny Noppert (Republic of Ireland) Steve Lennon (Republic of Ireland) William O'Connor
Players Championship Finals	2018	Runner-up	(Netherlands) Michael van Gerwen	(Netherlands) Michael van Gerwen (Wales) Gerwyn Price (England) Rob Cross (Belgium) Dimitri Van den Bergh (England) Nathan Aspinall (Northern Ireland) Daryl Gurney (Scotland) Gary Anderson (Scotland) Peter Wright (England) Michael Smith (England) Dave Chisnall (Germany) Martin Schindler (England) James Wade (Netherlands) Danny Noppert (Republic of Ireland) Steve Lennon (Republic of Ireland) William O'Connor
Champions League of Darts	2019	Runner-up	(Scotland) Peter Wright	(Netherlands) Michael van Gerwen (Wales) Gerwyn Price (England) Rob Cross (Belgium) Dimitri Van den Bergh (England) Nathan Aspinall (Northern Ireland) Daryl Gurney (Scotland) Gary Anderson (Scotland) Peter Wright (England) Michael Smith (England) Dave Chisnall (Germany) Martin Schindler (England) James Wade (Netherlands) Danny Noppert (Republic of Ireland) Steve Lennon (Republic of Ireland) William O'Connor
World Series of Darts Finals	2019	Runner-up	(Netherlands) Danny Noppert	(Netherlands) Michael van Gerwen (Wales) Gerwyn Price (England) Rob Cross (Belgium) Dimitri Van den Bergh (England) Nathan Aspinall (Northern Ireland) Daryl Gurney (Scotland) Gary Anderson (Scotland) Peter Wright (England) Michael Smith (England) Dave Chisnall (Germany) Martin Schindler (England) James Wade (Netherlands) Danny Noppert (Republic of Ireland) Steve Lennon (Republic of Ireland) William O'Connor
PDC World Cup of Darts	2019	Runners-Up	(Republic of Ireland) Steve Lennon (Republic of Ireland) William O'Connor	(Netherlands) Michael van Gerwen (Wales) Gerwyn Price (England) Rob Cross (Belgium) Dimitri Van den Bergh (England) Nathan Aspinall (Northern Ireland) Daryl Gurney (Scotland) Gary Anderson (Scotland) Peter Wright (England) Michael Smith (England) Dave Chisnall (Germany) Martin Schindler (England) James Wade (Netherlands) Danny Noppert (Republic of Ireland) Steve Lennon (Republic of Ireland) William O'Connor
Note: Players in italics had already qualified for the tournament.				(Netherlands) Michael van Gerwen (Wales) Gerwyn Price (England) Rob Cross (Belgium) Dimitri Van den Bergh (England) Nathan Aspinall (Northern Ireland) Daryl Gurney (Scotland) Gary Anderson (Scotland) Peter Wright (England) Michael Smith (England) Dave Chisnall (Germany) Martin Schindler (England) James Wade (Netherlands) Danny Noppert (Republic of Ireland) Steve Lennon (Republic of Ireland) William O'Connor

At most sixteen players could qualify through this method, where the position in the list depicts the priority of the qualification.

As the list of qualifiers from the main tournaments produced fewer than sixteen players, the field of sixteen players is filled from the reserve lists. The first list consists of the winners from 2019 European Tour events, in which the winners are ordered by number of event wins then in Order of Merit position order at the cut-off date.

PDC European Tour
Tournament	Event	Position	Player	Qualifiers
2019 European Tour
2019 European Tour	European Darts Open	Winner	(Netherlands) Michael van Gerwen	(England) Ian White
2019 European Tour	German Darts Championship	Winner	(Northern Ireland) Daryl Gurney	(England) Ian White
2019 European Tour	German Darts Grand Prix	Winner	(Netherlands) Michael van Gerwen	(England) Ian White
2019 European Tour	German Darts Open	Winner	(Netherlands) Michael van Gerwen	(England) Ian White
2019 European Tour	Austrian Darts Open	Winner	(Netherlands) Michael van Gerwen	(England) Ian White
2019 European Tour	European Darts Grand Prix	Winner	(England) Ian White	(England) Ian White
2019 European Tour	Dutch Darts Masters	Winner	(England) Ian White	(England) Ian White
2019 European Tour	Danish Darts Open	Winner	(England) Dave Chisnall	(England) Ian White
2019 European Tour	Czech Darts Open	Winner	(England) Jamie Hughes	(England) Ian White
2019 European Tour	Austrian Darts Championship	Winner	(Austria) Mensur Suljović	(England) Ian White
2019 European Tour	European Darts Matchplay	Winner	(England) Joe Cullen	(England) Ian White
2019 European Tour	International Darts Open	Winner	(Wales) Gerwyn Price	(England) Ian White
2019 European Tour	Gibraltar Darts Trophy	Winner	(Poland) Krzysztof Ratajski	(England) Ian White
Note: Players in italics had already qualified for the tournament.				(England) Ian White

If there were still less than sixteen qualified players after the winners of European Tour events are added, then the winners of 2019 Players Championships events would have been added, firstly by winners of multiple events followed by Order of Merit order, but that was not needed for this year's competition.

=== PDC Qualifying Event ===
A further eight places in the Grand Slam of Darts were filled by qualifiers from a PDC qualifier in Wigan on 4 November. These are the qualifiers:

- (Germany) Gabriel Clemens
- (England) Ryan Harrington
- (Scotland) Robert Thornton
- (Northern Ireland) Brendan Dolan
- (England) Jamie Hughes
- (England) Darren Webster
- (England) Ross Smith
- (England) Adrian Lewis

=== BDO Qualifying Tournaments ===
The men's and women's champions from the 2019 BDO World Darts Championship were invited, as was the winner of the 2019 BDO World Trophy.

Tournament	Year	Position	Player
BDO World Darts Championship	2019	Men's Winner	(England) Glen Durrant
BDO World Darts Championship	2019	Women's Winner	(Japan) Mikuru Suzuki
BDO World Trophy	2019	Winner	(Wales) Jim Williams

=== BDO Ranking qualifiers ===
The top ranked male and female players were invited.

- (Netherlands) Wesley Harms
- (England) Lisa Ashton

Three more invitations were given to the next highest ranked men's players:

- (Netherlands) Richard Veenstra
- (England) Dave Parletti
- (Wales) Wayne Warren

== Pools ==
Pool A	Pool B	Pool C	Pool D
(PDC Seeded Players)	(PDC Qualifiers)		(BDO Representatives)
(Netherlands) Michael van Gerwen (1) (England) Rob Cross (2) (England) Michael Smith (3) (Scotland) Gary Anderson (4) (Wales) Gerwyn Price (5) (Northern Ireland) Daryl Gurney (6) (Scotland) Peter Wright (7) (England) James Wade (8)	(England) Dave Chisnall (England) Ian White (England) Nathan Aspinall (England) Adrian Lewis (England) Darren Webster (Belgium) Dimitri Van den Bergh (Netherlands) Danny Noppert (Northern Ireland) Brendan Dolan	(Republic of Ireland) Steve Lennon (Republic of Ireland) William O'Connor (Germany) Gabriel Clemens (England) Ross Smith (Germany) Martin Schindler (England) Jamie Hughes (Scotland) Robert Thornton (England) Ryan Harrington	(England) Glen Durrant (Japan) Mikuru Suzuki (Wales) Jim Williams (Netherlands) Wesley Harms (England) Lisa Ashton (Netherlands) Richard Veenstra (England) Dave Parletti (Wales) Wayne Warren

== Draw ==
=== Group stage ===
All group matches are best of nine legs
After three games, the top two in each group qualify for the knock-out stage

NB: P = Played; W = Won; L = Lost; LF = Legs for; LA = Legs against; +/− = Plus/minus record, in relation to legs; Pts = Points; Status = Qualified to knockout stage

==== Group A ====
Pos.	Player	P	W	L	LF	LA	+/−	Pts	Status
1	(Netherlands) Michael van Gerwen (1)	3	3	0	15	6	+9	6	Q
2	(England) Adrian Lewis (Q)	3	2	1	12	10	+2	4	Q
3	(Wales) Jim Williams (BDO)	3	1	2	10	11	–1	2	Eliminated
4	(England) Ross Smith (Q)	3	0	3	5	15	–10	0	Eliminated

9 November

97.89 Michael van Gerwen (Netherlands)	5 – 2	(Wales) Jim Williams 83.34
87.48 Adrian Lewis (England)	5 – 2	(England) Ross Smith 86.11

10 November

104.53 Michael van Gerwen (Netherlands)	5 – 2	(England) Adrian Lewis 96.29
85.63 Ross Smith (England)	1 – 5	(Wales) Jim Williams 92.35

12 November

111.38 Michael van Gerwen (Netherlands)	5 – 2	(England) Ross Smith 101.10
96.69 Adrian Lewis (England)	5 – 3	(Wales) Jim Williams 91.38

==== Group B ====
Pos.	Player	P	W	L	LF	LA	+/−	Pts	Status
1	(England) James Wade (8)	3	2	1	14	11	+3	4	Q
2	(England) Ian White	3	2	1	14	11	+3	4	Q
3	(Republic of Ireland) Steve Lennon	3	2	1	12	13	–1	4	Eliminated
4	(Netherlands) Wesley Harms (BDO)	3	0	3	10	15	–5	0	Eliminated

9 November

93.72 James Wade (England)	5 – 2	(Netherlands) Wesley Harms 86.78
88.94 Ian White (England)	5 – 2	(Republic of Ireland) Steve Lennon 90.42

10 November

99.84 James Wade (England)	5 – 4	(England) Ian White 98.17
88.31 Steve Lennon (Republic of Ireland)	5 – 4	(Netherlands) Wesley Harms 82.78

12 November

86.66 James Wade (England)	4 – 5	(Republic of Ireland) Steve Lennon 91.73
97.09 Ian White (England)	5 – 4	(Netherlands) Wesley Harms 97.66

==== Group C ====
Pos.	Player	P	W	L	LF	LA	+/−	Pts	Status
1	(Wales) Gerwyn Price (5)	3	3	0	15	9	+6	6	Q
2	(Scotland) Robert Thornton (Q)	3	2	1	14	12	+2	4	Q
3	(Belgium) Dimitri Van den Bergh	3	1	2	11	11	0	2	Eliminated
4	(Japan) Mikuru Suzuki (BDO)	3	0	3	7	15	–8	0	Eliminated

9 November

88.21 Gerwyn Price (Wales)	5 – 3	(Japan) Mikuru Suzuki 84.24
95.44 Dimitri Van den Bergh (Belgium)	4 – 5	(Scotland) Robert Thornton 91.46

10 November

92.12 Gerwyn Price (Wales)	5 – 4	(Scotland) Robert Thornton 93.26
90.80 Dimitri Van den Bergh (Belgium)	5 – 1	(Japan) Mikuru Suzuki 84.65

12 November

97.14 Gerwyn Price (Wales)	5 – 2	(Belgium) Dimitri Van den Bergh 91.59
94.25 Robert Thornton (Scotland)	5 – 3	(Japan) Mikuru Suzuki 85.60

==== Group D ====
Pos.	Player	P	W	L	LF	LA	+/−	Pts	Status
1	(Scotland) Gary Anderson (4)	3	2	1	14	9	+5	4	Q
2	(England) Darren Webster (Q)	3	2	1	13	11	+2	4	Q
3	(Republic of Ireland) William O'Connor	3	1	2	10	13	–3	2	Eliminated
4	(England) Dave Parletti (BDO)	3	1	2	8	12	–4	2	Eliminated

9 November

94.75 Gary Anderson (Scotland)	5 – 1	(England) Dave Parletti 86.20
96.70 Darren Webster (England)	3 – 5	(Republic of Ireland) William O'Connor 98.87

10 November

105.08 Gary Anderson (Scotland)	5 – 3	(Republic of Ireland) William O'Connor 92.21
91.61 Darren Webster (England)	5 – 2	(England) Dave Parletti 85.05

12 November

97.17 Gary Anderson (Scotland)	4 – 5	(England) Darren Webster 100.86
88.87 William O'Connor (Republic of Ireland)	2 – 5	(England) Dave Parletti 83.97

==== Group E ====
Pos.	Player	P	W	L	LF	LA	+/−	Pts	Status
1	(England) Dave Chisnall	3	3	0	15	7	+8	6	Q
2	(England) Rob Cross (2)	3	2	1	13	11	+2	4	Q
3	(England) Jamie Hughes (Q)	3	1	2	12	11	+1	2	Eliminated
4	(England) Lisa Ashton (BDO)	3	0	3	4	15	–11	0	Eliminated

9 November

93.19 Rob Cross (England)	5 – 2	(England) Lisa Ashton 80.70
97.19 Dave Chisnall (England)	5 – 3	(England) Jamie Hughes 95.75

10 November

95.19 Rob Cross (England)	3 – 5	(England) Dave Chisnall 94.61
94.42 Jamie Hughes (England)	5 – 1	(England) Lisa Ashton 86.80

11 November

92.10 Rob Cross (England)	5 – 4	(England) Jamie Hughes 85.65
94.61 Dave Chisnall (England)	5 – 1	(England) Lisa Ashton 82.50

==== Group F ====
Pos.	Player	P	W	L	LF	LA	+/−	Pts	Status
1	(Scotland) Peter Wright (7)	3	3	0	15	6	+9	6	Q
2	(England) Ryan Harrington (Q)	3	2	1	12	10	+2	4	Q
3	(Netherlands) Danny Noppert	3	1	2	11	11	0	2	Eliminated
4	(Wales) Wayne Warren (BDO)	3	0	3	4	15	–11	0	Eliminated

9 November

98.16 Peter Wright (Scotland)	5 – 2	(Wales) Wayne Warren 88.65
95.34 Danny Noppert (Netherlands)	4 – 5	(England) Ryan Harrington 93.65

10 November

101.11 Peter Wright (Scotland)	5 – 2	(England) Ryan Harrington 86.34
97.50 Danny Noppert (Netherlands)	5 – 1	(Wales) Wayne Warren 92.46

11 November

99.77 Peter Wright (Scotland)	5 – 2	(Netherlands) Danny Noppert 98.58
78.58 Ryan Harrington (England)	5 – 1	(Wales) Wayne Warren 74.72

==== Group G ====
Pos.	Player	P	W	L	LF	LA	+/−	Pts	Status
1	(Germany) Gabriel Clemens (Q)	3	3	0	15	7	+8	6	Q
2	(Northern Ireland) Daryl Gurney (6)	3	2	1	14	7	+7	4	Q
3	(Northern Ireland) Brendan Dolan (Q)	3	1	2	8	11	–3	2	Eliminated
4	(Netherlands) Richard Veenstra (BDO)	3	0	3	3	15	–12	0	Eliminated

9 November

91.65 Daryl Gurney (Northern Ireland)	5 – 0	(Netherlands) Richard Veenstra 75.69
92.55 Brendan Dolan (Northern Ireland)	1 – 5	(Germany) Gabriel Clemens 99.40

10 November

100.80 Daryl Gurney (Northern Ireland)	4 – 5	(Germany) Gabriel Clemens 97.43
91.56 Brendan Dolan (Northern Ireland)	5 – 1	(Netherlands) Richard Veenstra 79.76

11 November

95.03 Daryl Gurney (Northern Ireland)	5 – 2	(Northern Ireland) Brendan Dolan 92.34
110.27 Gabriel Clemens (Germany)	5 – 2	(Netherlands) Richard Veenstra 90.26

==== Group H ====
Pos.	Player	P	W	L	LF	LA	+/−	Pts	Status
1	(England) Michael Smith (3)	3	3	0	15	8	+7	6	Q
2	(England) Glen Durrant (BDO)	3	2	1	13	9	+4	4	Q
3	(England) Nathan Aspinall	3	1	2	6	10	–4	2	Eliminated
4	(Germany) Martin Schindler	3	0	3	8	15	–7	0	Eliminated

9 November

99.28 Michael Smith (England)	5 – 3	(England) Glen Durrant 93.08
98.88 Nathan Aspinall (England)	5 – 0	(Germany) Martin Schindler 91.54

10 November

113.62 Michael Smith (England)	5 – 1	(England) Nathan Aspinall 104.65
88.74 Martin Schindler (Germany)	4 – 5	(England) Glen Durrant 89.52

11 November

91.38 Michael Smith (England)	5 – 4	(Germany) Martin Schindler 86.18
86.26 Nathan Aspinall (England)	0 – 5	(England) Glen Durrant 86.38

=== Knockout stage ===
Second round (best of 19 legs); 13–14 November
A1	(Netherlands) Michael van Gerwen (1) 101.41	10
B2	(England) Ian White 97.50	7
B1	(England) James Wade (8) 93.23	9
A2	(England) Adrian Lewis (Q) 95.99	10
C1	(Wales) Gerwyn Price (5) 98.75	10
D2	(England) Darren Webster (Q) 90.56	1
D1	(Scotland) Gary Anderson (4) 90.97	10
C2	(Scotland) Robert Thornton (Q) 87.36	8
E1	(England) Dave Chisnall 102.02	10
F2	(England) Ryan Harrington (Q) 96.47	3
F1	(Scotland) Peter Wright (7) 98.59	10
E2	(England) Rob Cross (2) 89.06	3
G1	(Germany) Gabriel Clemens (Q) 98.34	9
H2	(England) Glen Durrant (BDO) 96.47	10
H1	(England) Michael Smith (3) 101.56	10
G2	(Northern Ireland) Daryl Gurney (6) 100.49	7

Quarter-finals (best of 31 legs); 15–16 November
A1	(Netherlands) Michael van Gerwen (1) 103.05	16
A2	(England) Adrian Lewis (Q) 86.28	6
C1	(Wales) Gerwyn Price (5) 95.69	16
D1	(Scotland) Gary Anderson (4) 91.37	9
E1	(England) Dave Chisnall 98.64	12
F1	(Scotland) Peter Wright (7) 101.25	16
H2	(England) Glen Durrant (BDO) 98.15	16
H1	(England) Michael Smith (3) 97.95	12

Semi-finals (best of 31 legs); 17 November
A1	(Netherlands) Michael van Gerwen (1) 101.91	12
C1	(Wales) Gerwyn Price (5) 100.73	16
F1	(Scotland) Peter Wright (7) 97.34	16
H2	(England) Glen Durrant (BDO) 94.28	11

Final (best of 31 legs); 17 November
C1	(Wales) Gerwyn Price (5) 107.86	16
F1	(Scotland) Peter Wright (7) 96.28	6
