= 2020 World Matchplay =

2020 Betfred World Matchplay

Tournament information
- Dates: 18–26 July 2020
- Venue: Arena MK
- Location: Milton Keynes, England
- Organisation(s): Professional Darts Corporation (PDC)
- Format: Legs
- Prize fund: £700,000
- Winner's share: £150,000
- High checkout: 170; Gabriel Clemens; Dimitri Van den Bergh

Champion(s)
- Dimitri Van den Bergh (BEL)

The 2020 Betfred World Matchplay was the 27th annual staging of the World Matchplay, organised by the Professional Darts Corporation. The tournament took place, behind closed doors, at the Arena MK, Milton Keynes, from 18 to 26 July 2020.

Rob Cross was the defending champion, having won his first World Matchplay title with an 18–13 win over Michael Smith in the 2019 final. However, he was beaten by Gabriel Clemens 10–8 in the first round.

Dimitri Van den Bergh became the first unseeded player since James Wade in 2006 to reach the World Matchplay final; like Wade, Van den Bergh was making his debut in the competition. He went on to win his first major title, beating Gary Anderson 18–10 in the final. Van den Bergh was the first debutant to win the World Matchplay, excluding Larry Butler's win in the inaugural tournament.

The tournament was moved from its planned venue of Winter Gardens, Blackpool, due to the disruption caused by the COVID-19 pandemic. This was the first and so far only time the tournament has not been held in Blackpool.

== Prize money ==
The prize fund remained at £700,000, with the winner's earnings being £150,000.

Position (no. of players)		Prize money (Total: £700,000)
Winner	(1)	£150,000
Runner-up	(1)	£70,000
Semi-finalists	(2)	£50,000
Quarter-finalists	(4)	£25,000
Second round	(8)	£15,000
First round	(16)	£10,000

== Format ==
All games have to be won by two clear legs, with a game being extended if necessary for a maximum of six extra legs before a tie-break leg is required. For example, in a first to 10 legs first round match, if the score reaches 12-12 then the 25th leg will be the decider. The first round is played first to 10 legs, second round first to 11 legs, quarter finals first to 16 legs, semi final first to 17 legs and final first to 18 legs.

== Qualification ==
Under the published rules, the top 16 players on the PDC Order of Merit as of 12 July 2020 were seeded for the tournament. The top 16 players on the ProTour Order of Merit, not to have already qualified on the cut-off date were unseeded.

The following players have qualified for the tournament:

=== PDC Order of Merit ===
1. Michael van Gerwen (second round)
2. Peter Wright (second round)
3. Gerwyn Price (first round)
4. Rob Cross (first round)
5. Michael Smith (semi-finals)
6. Nathan Aspinall (first round)
7. Daryl Gurney (second round)
8. Gary Anderson (runner-up)
9. James Wade (second round)
10. Dave Chisnall (first round)
11. Ian White (first round)
12. Mensur Suljović (second round)
13. Krzysztof Ratajski (quarter-finals)
14. Adrian Lewis (quarter-finals)
15. Glen Durrant (semi-finals)
16. Simon Whitlock (quarter-finals)

=== PDC ProTour qualifiers ===
1. Joe Cullen (second round)
2. Brendan Dolan (first round)
3. José de Sousa (first round)
4. Danny Noppert (second round)
5. Jermaine Wattimena (first round)
6. Gabriel Clemens (second round)
7. Jonny Clayton (first round)
8. Jamie Hughes (first round)
9. Jeffrey de Zwaan (first round)
10. Ryan Joyce (first round)
11. Dimitri Van den Bergh (champion)
12. Justin Pipe (first round)
13. Vincent van der Voort (quarter-finals)
14. Keegan Brown (first round)
15. Steve Beaton (first round)
16. Ricky Evans (first round)

== Draw ==
First round (best of 19 legs); 18–21 July
1	Michael van Gerwen 99.82	10
Brendan Dolan 91.88	7
16	Simon Whitlock 89.96	10
Ryan Joyce 90.11	4
8	Gary Anderson 90.59	10
Justin Pipe 87.41	5
9	James Wade 96.58	12
Keegan Brown 99.45	10
4	Rob Cross 94.40	8
Gabriel Clemens 89.22	10
13	Krzysztof Ratajski 107.53	10
Jermaine Wattimena 96.47	4
5	Michael Smith 101.02	10
Jonny Clayton 91.10	3
12	Mensur Suljović 100.47	12
Jamie Hughes 101.13	10
2	Peter Wright 98.94	10
José de Sousa 96.21	8
15	Glen Durrant 106.93	10
Jeffrey de Zwaan 96.71	3
7	Daryl Gurney 92.37	10
Ricky Evans 90.29	5
10	Dave Chisnall 94.20	6
Vincent van der Voort 98.95	10
3	Gerwyn Price 90.73	7
Danny Noppert 90.92	10
14	Adrian Lewis 97.27	11
Steve Beaton 89.94	9
6	Nathan Aspinall 93.54	5
Dimitri Van den Bergh 98.42	10
11	Ian White 93.80	12
Joe Cullen 90.42	13

Second round (best of 21 legs); 21–22 July
1	Michael van Gerwen 90.80	4
16	Simon Whitlock 98.11	11
8	Gary Anderson 92.91	11
9	James Wade 93.96	8
Gabriel Clemens 96.89	10
13	Krzysztof Ratajski 99.69	12
5	Michael Smith 94.99	14
12	Mensur Suljović 91.70	12
2	Peter Wright 100.87	8
15	Glen Durrant 98.36	11
7	Daryl Gurney 93.79	5
Vincent van der Voort 97.67	11
Danny Noppert 87.63	7
14	Adrian Lewis 99.81	11
Dimitri Van den Bergh 93.19	11
Joe Cullen 92.81	9

Quarter-finals (best of 31 legs); 23–24 July
16	Simon Whitlock 95.29	12
8	Gary Anderson 98.09	16
13	Krzysztof Ratajski 93.82	13
5	Michael Smith 98.32	16
15	Glen Durrant 95.21	18
Vincent van der Voort 93.79	16
14	Adrian Lewis 96.26	12
Dimitri Van den Bergh 99.67	16

Semi-finals (best of 33 legs); 25 July
8	Gary Anderson 97.99	18
5	Michael Smith 93.85	16
15	Glen Durrant 98.44	15
Dimitri Van den Bergh 98.97	17

Final (best of 35 legs); 26 July
8	Gary Anderson 92.81	10
Dimitri Van den Bergh 98.31	18
