= 2020 Premier League Darts =

Darts competition

2020 Unibet Premier League Darts

Tournament information
- Nine-dart finish: Michael Smith; Peter Wright

Champion(s)
- Glen Durrant (ENG)

The 2020 Unibet Premier League Darts was a darts tournament organised by the Professional Darts Corporation – the sixteenth edition of the tournament. The event began on Thursday 6 February at the P&J Live in Aberdeen and ended with the Play-offs at the Coventry Arena in Coventry on Thursday 15 October, after a delay was caused by the COVID-19 outbreak.

Michael van Gerwen was the four-time defending champion after defeating Rob Cross 11–5 in the 2019 final. However, he was eliminated from the competition in week 16, after an 8–2 defeat to Daryl Gurney, and a poor run of form saw him slip out of the playoffs, for the first time in his career.

Glen Durrant, who was making his debut in the tournament, finished the regular season in 1st place (becoming only the third player to do so at the time, after van Gerwen and Phil Taylor) to set up a semi-final meeting between Gary Anderson. Durrant claimed a narrow 10–9 victory (including surviving 4 match darts from Anderson), before eventually winning the competition, by beating fellow debutant Nathan Aspinall 11–8 in the final to claim his first televised PDC title.

This was also the first time in Premier League Darts history that the four players that qualified for the finals had not appeared in the finals of the previous year's edition (the four players being van Gerwen, Gurney, Cross and James Wade).

On 12 March 2020, it was announced that the double-header due to be played in Rotterdam had been postponed due to coronavirus concerns. The following day it was announced that the Rotterdam dates would be moved to September, with the culmination of the tournament taking place there instead of London. On 16 March 2020. it was announced the round to be played in Newcastle would be moved to October, taking over as the tournament's final round.

The May dates were postponed on 9 April 2020, with the PDC announcing a fully rescheduled calendar, the play-offs now taking place in Sheffield. Further changes were announced in July and August, with the cancellation of the events in Birmingham, Belfast, Leeds, Berlin, Glasgow, Manchester, Newcastle, Sheffield, and the double header in Rotterdam; and the reinstatement of The O_{2} Arena as the host of the final. Ten nights were added to the calendar to be held behind closed doors at the Marshall Arena in Milton Keynes. The play-offs were subsequently moved to the Ricoh Arena in Coventry and also played behind closed doors.

== Format ==
The tournament format remained the same as 2019, with the only difference being the re-branding of 'contenders' to 'challengers' for the season.

Phase 1: In each round, eight of the nine players play each other in four matches and the ninth player plays one match against one of the nine challengers. Phase 1 matches have a maximum of twelve legs, allowing for the winner being first to seven or a six-six draw. At the end of Phase 1, the bottom player is eliminated from the competition.

Phase 2: In each round, the remaining eight players play each other in four matches. Phase 2 matches have a maximum of fourteen legs, allowing for the winner being first to eight or a seven-seven draw. At the end of Phase 2, the bottom four players in the league table are eliminated from the competition.

Play-off Night: The top four players in the league table contest the two knockout semi-finals with 1st playing 4th and 2nd playing 3rd. The semi-finals are first to 10 legs (best of 19). The two winning semi-finalists meet in the final which is first to 11 legs (best of 21).

== Venues ==
The only change of venues from 2019 to 2020 was the introduction of the P&J Live in Aberdeen, which hosted the opening night's action.

Following the COVID-19 outbreak, the rounds in Birmingham, Belfast, Leeds, Berlin, Rotterdam, Glasgow, Manchester, Newcastle and Sheffield were cancelled, with rounds being added in Milton Keynes to make up.

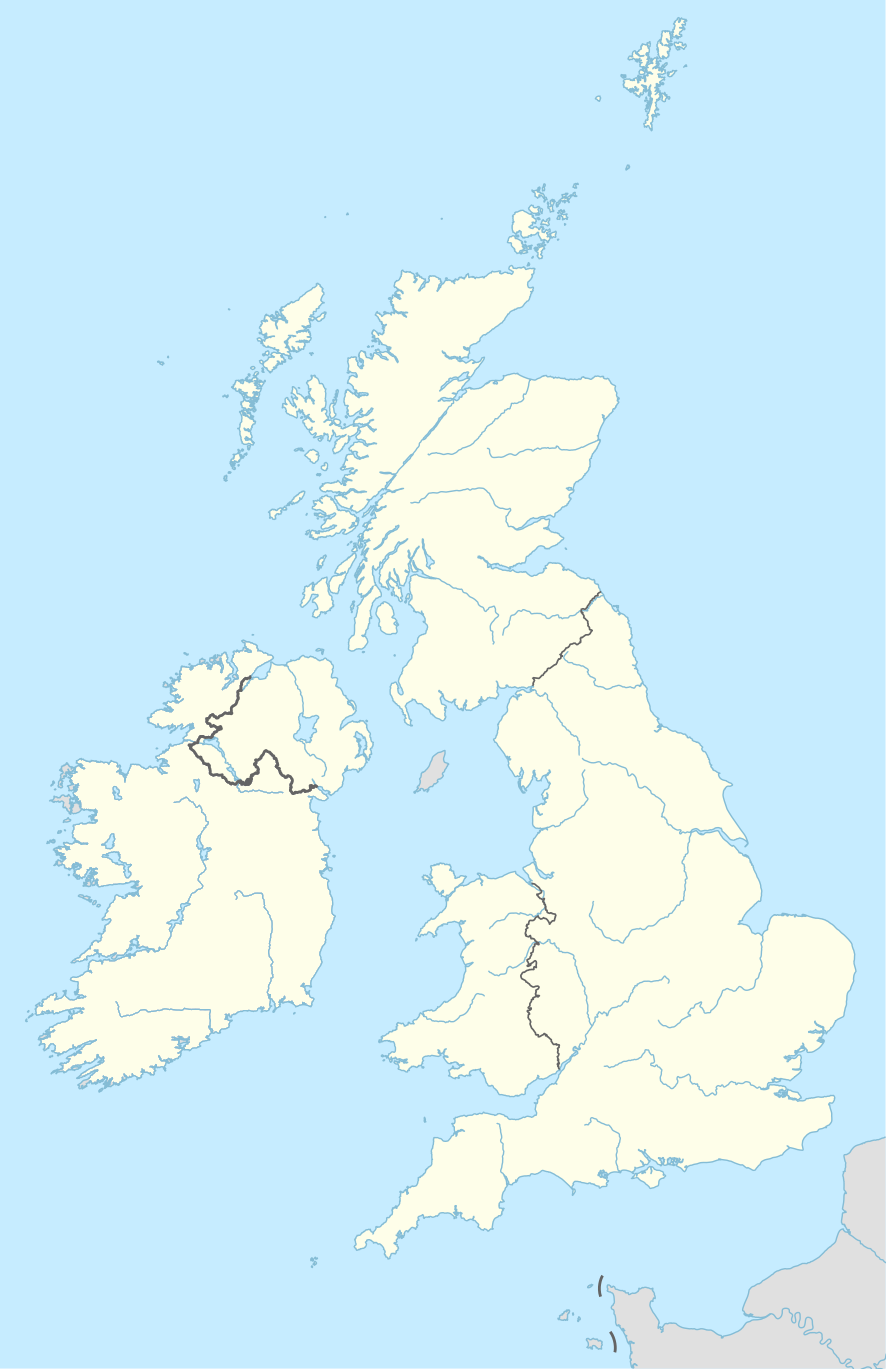
Locations of the 2020 Premier League venues in the UK and Ireland.
Other locations of the 2020 Premier League venues in Europe.

(Scotland) Aberdeen	(England) Nottingham	(Wales) Cardiff	(Republic of Ireland) Dublin
P&J Live; Thursday 6 February	Nottingham Arena; Thursday 13 February	Cardiff International Arena; Thursday 20 February	3Arena; Thursday 27 February
(England) Exeter	(England) Liverpool	(England) Birmingham	(Northern Ireland) Belfast
Westpoint Exeter; Thursday 5 March	Liverpool Arena; Thursday 12 March	Arena Birmingham (cancelled)	SSE Arena Belfast (cancelled)
(England) Leeds	(Germany) Berlin	(Netherlands) Rotterdam	(England) Milton Keynes
Leeds Arena (cancelled)	Mercedes-Benz Arena (cancelled)	Rotterdam Ahoy (cancelled)	Arena MK; Tuesday 25 August – Saturday 5 September
(Scotland) Glasgow	(England) Manchester	(England) Newcastle	(England) Sheffield
OVO Hydro (cancelled)	Manchester Arena (cancelled)	Newcastle Arena (cancelled)	Sheffield Arena (cancelled)
(England) London	(England) Coventry		
The O_{2} Arena (cancelled)	Coventry Arena; Thursday 15 October		

== Prize money ==
The prize money for the 2020 tournament remained at £825,000.

Stage	Prize money
Winner	£250,000
Runner-up	£120,000
Semi-finalists (x2)	£80,000
5th place	£70,000
6th place	£60,000
7th place	£55,000
8th place	£50,000
9th place	£35,000
League Winner Bonus	£25,000
Total	£825,000

== Players ==
The players in this year's tournament were announced following the 2020 PDC World Darts Championship final on 1 January. The top four on the PDC Order of Merit are joined by five wildcards.

Player	Appearance in Premier League	Consecutive Streak	Order of Merit Rank on 1/1/20	Previous best performance	Qualification
(Netherlands) Michael van Gerwen	8th	8	1	Winner (2013, 2016, 2017, 2018, 2019)	PDC Order of Merit
(Scotland) Peter Wright	7th	7	2	Runner-up (2017)	PDC Order of Merit
(Wales) Gerwyn Price	3rd	3	3	5th (2019)	PDC Order of Merit
(England) Rob Cross	3rd	3	4	Runner-up (2019)	PDC Order of Merit
(England) Michael Smith	4th	3	5	Runner-up (2018)	Wildcard
(Scotland) Gary Anderson	9th	1 (Note: Anderson qualified for the 2019 Premier League Darts, but withdrew following an injury.)	6	Winner (2011, 2015)	Wildcard
(Northern Ireland) Daryl Gurney	3rd	3	7	Semi-final (2019)	Wildcard
(England) Nathan Aspinall	1st (Note: Competed in 2019 Premier League Darts as a contender.)	1	8	Debut	Wildcard
(England) Glen Durrant	1st	1	22	Debut	Wildcard

The format is similar to that of 2019, with 9 main players plus 9 invited players, now referred to as 'challengers' in a re-brand from the tag of 'contenders'. The 9 main players earn league points if they win or draw against the challengers. The challengers do not earn any league points but they earn financial bonuses if they win or draw their match.

Player	Venue	Order of Merit Rank on 1/1/20
(Scotland) John Henderson	Aberdeen	31
(England) Fallon Sherrock	Nottingham	91 (Note: Not a PDC Tour Card holder following the 2020 PDC World Darts Championship)
(Wales) Jonny Clayton	Cardiff	16
(Republic of Ireland) William O'Connor	Dublin	37
(England) Luke Humphries	Exeter	35
(England) Stephen Bunting	Liverpool	17
(England) Chris Dobey	Milton Keynes	19
(Netherlands) Jeffrey de Zwaan	Milton Keynes	20
(Netherlands) Jermaine Wattimena	Milton Keynes	23

== League stage ==
Players in italics are "Challengers", and only play on that night.

=== 6 February – Night 1 (Phase 1) ===
(Scotland) P&J Live, Aberdeen

	Score	
Michael Smith (England); 95.41	3 – 7	(England) Glen Durrant; 95.01
Gary Anderson (Scotland); 94.71	7 – 5	(Northern Ireland) Daryl Gurney; 91.65
Michael van Gerwen (Netherlands); 104.13	7 – 5	(Scotland) Peter Wright; 97.71
Nathan Aspinall (England); 89.19	7 – 3	(Scotland) John Henderson; 81.93
Gerwyn Price (Wales); 95.86	6 – 6	(England) Rob Cross; 100.10
Night's Average: 94.62
Highest Checkout: (England) Nathan Aspinall 170
Most 180s: (Netherlands) Michael van Gerwen and (Scotland) Peter Wright 4
Night's 180s: 25

=== 13 February – Night 2 (Phase 1) ===
(England) Nottingham Arena, Nottingham

	Score	
Rob Cross (England); 94.71	7 – 5	(England) Nathan Aspinall; 95.48
Gerwyn Price (Wales); 98.11	6 – 6	(England) Michael Smith; 101.71
Gary Anderson (Scotland); 95.58	6 – 6	(Scotland) Peter Wright; 88.72
Glen Durrant (England); 92.21	6 – 6	(England) Fallon Sherrock; 87.36
Daryl Gurney (Northern Ireland); 93.92	1 – 7	(Netherlands) Michael van Gerwen; 105.05
Night's Average: 94.81
Highest Checkout: (England) Michael Smith 140
Most 180s: (Scotland) Peter Wright 6
Night's 180s: 27

=== 20 February – Night 3 (Phase 1) ===
(Wales) Cardiff International Arena, Cardiff

	Score	
Peter Wright (Scotland); 101.95	7 – 5	(England) Rob Cross; 90.13
Jonny Clayton (Wales); 97.44	1 – 7	(England) Michael Smith; 105.51
Michael van Gerwen (Netherlands); 97.61	5 – 7	(England) Nathan Aspinall; 101.12
Daryl Gurney (Northern Ireland); 97.46	6 – 6	(Wales) Gerwyn Price; 93.70
Glen Durrant (England); 97.24	7 – 4	(Scotland) Gary Anderson; 96.89
Night's Average: 97.64
Highest Checkout: (England) Michael Smith 167
Most 180s: Four players 3
Night's 180s: 21

=== 27 February – Night 4 (Phase 1) ===
(Republic of Ireland) 3Arena, Dublin

	Score	
Glen Durrant (England); 92.81	5 – 7	(England) Nathan Aspinall; 93.82
Rob Cross (England); 91.36	5 – 7	(Scotland) Gary Anderson; 97.77
Daryl Gurney (Northern Ireland); 85.98	5 – 7	(England) Michael Smith; 88.19
William O'Connor (Republic of Ireland); 95.31	4 – 7	(Netherlands) Michael van Gerwen; 97.62
Gerwyn Price (Wales); 98.75	7 – 1	(Scotland) Peter Wright; 83.59
Night's Average: 92.62
Highest Checkout: (England) Glen Durrant 144
Most 180s: (Scotland) Gary Anderson and (Northern Ireland) Daryl Gurney 4
Night's 180s: 22
Nine-dart finish: (England) Michael Smith

=== 5 March – Night 5 (Phase 1) ===
(England) Westpoint Exeter, Exeter

	Score	
Rob Cross (England); 98.55	6 – 6	(Northern Ireland) Daryl Gurney; 94.88
Gerwyn Price (Wales); 96.68	3 – 7	(England) Glen Durrant; 100.76
Nathan Aspinall (England); 99.67	3 – 7	(Scotland) Peter Wright; 110.00
Gary Anderson (Scotland); 87.76	5 – 7	(England) Luke Humphries; 88.67
Michael Smith (England); 95.42	7 – 4	(Netherlands) Michael van Gerwen; 99.43
Night's Average: 96.50
Highest Checkout: (England) Michael Smith 134
Most 180s: (England) Rob Cross, (Scotland) Peter Wright and (Scotland) Gary Anderson 4
Night's 180s: 26

=== 12 March – Night 6 (Phase 1) ===
(England) Liverpool Arena, Liverpool

	Score	
Michael Smith (England); 94.00	4 – 7	(Scotland) Peter Wright; 100.78
Daryl Gurney (Northern Ireland); 95.43	5 – 7	(England) Glen Durrant; 95.39
Gerwyn Price (Wales); 98.07	5 – 7	(Netherlands) Michael van Gerwen; 106.27
Rob Cross (England); 90.14	6 – 6	(England) Stephen Bunting; 91.25
Gary Anderson (Scotland); 94.27	6 – 6	(England) Nathan Aspinall; 107.64
Night's Average: 97.07
Highest Checkout: (Wales) Gerwyn Price 157
Most 180s: (England) Nathan Aspinall 8
Night's 180s: 37

=== 25 August – Night 7 (Phase 1) ===
(England) Arena MK, Milton Keynes

	Score	
Michael Smith (England); 107.02	3 – 7	(Scotland) Gary Anderson; 109.24
Michael van Gerwen (Netherlands); 103.37	7 – 2	(England) Rob Cross; 89.48
Nathan Aspinall (England); 97.82	7 – 4	(Wales) Gerwyn Price; 96.33
Chris Dobey (England); 79.01	2 – 7	(Northern Ireland) Daryl Gurney; 86.88
Peter Wright (Scotland); 99.43	6 – 6	(England) Glen Durrant; 102.43
Night's Average: 97.02
Highest Checkout: (Scotland) Peter Wright 170
Most 180s: (England) Michael Smith 7
Night's 180s: 25

=== 26 August – Night 8 (Phase 1) ===
(England) Arena MK, Milton Keynes

	Score	
Gary Anderson (Scotland); 95.53	1 – 7	(Wales) Gerwyn Price; 99.16
Nathan Aspinall (England); 103.01	5 – 7	(Northern Ireland) Daryl Gurney; 97.95
Michael Smith (England); 96.57	7 – 3	(England) Rob Cross; 93.61
Michael van Gerwen (Netherlands); 98.18	3 – 7	(England) Glen Durrant; 104.43
Peter Wright (Scotland); 102.26	7 – 1	(Netherlands) Jeffrey de Zwaan; 92.05
Night's Average: 98.38
Highest Checkout: (England) Glen Durrant 167
Most 180s: (England) Nathan Aspinall and (England) Michael Smith 5
Night's 180s: 25

=== 27 August – Night 9 (Phase 1) (Judgement Night) ===
(England) Arena MK, Milton Keynes

	Score	
Nathan Aspinall (England); 102.96	7 – 5	(England) Michael Smith; 102.06
Michael van Gerwen (Netherlands); 95.21	4 – 7	(Scotland) Gary Anderson; 99.77
Jermaine Wattimena (Netherlands); 81.24	0 – 7	(Wales) Gerwyn Price; 102.15
Peter Wright (Scotland); 99.21	7 – 4	(Northern Ireland) Daryl Gurney; 91.90
Glen Durrant (England); 106.02	7 – 4	(England) Rob Cross; 103.97
Night's Average: 98.91
Highest Checkout: (England) Glen Durrant 167
Most 180s: (England) Michael Smith 6
Night's 180s: 23
Eliminated: (England) Rob Cross

=== 28 August – Night 10 (Phase 2) ===
(England) Arena MK, Milton Keynes

	Score	
Glen Durrant (England); 98.56	8 – 4	(Wales) Gerwyn Price; 93.46
Peter Wright (Scotland); 101.54	5 – 8	(Scotland) Gary Anderson; 101.19
Nathan Aspinall (England); 96.09	6 – 8	(Netherlands) Michael van Gerwen; 95.33
Michael Smith (England); 94.02	8 – 3	(Northern Ireland) Daryl Gurney; 88.13
Night's Average: 96.11
Highest Checkout: (Wales) Gerwyn Price 140
Most 180s: (Scotland) Peter Wright, (England) Nathan Aspinall and (England) Michael Smith 5
Night's 180s: 29

=== 29 August – Night 11 (Phase 2) ===
(England) Arena MK, Milton Keynes

	Score	
Daryl Gurney (Northern Ireland); 94.93	8 – 6	(Scotland) Peter Wright; 103.07
Michael Smith (England); 93.74	6 – 8	(England) Nathan Aspinall; 96.46
Gary Anderson (Scotland); 95.80	7 – 7	(England) Glen Durrant; 97.01
Michael van Gerwen (Netherlands); 99.19	4 – 8	(Wales) Gerwyn Price; 95.81
Night's Average: 96.92
Highest Checkout: (Northern Ireland) Daryl Gurney 164
Most 180s: (Scotland) Peter Wright 9
Night's 180s: 29
Nine-dart finish: (Scotland) Peter Wright

=== 30 August – Night 12 (Phase 2) ===
(England) Arena MK, Milton Keynes

	Score	
Nathan Aspinall (England); 98.18	6 – 8	(Scotland) Gary Anderson; 101.36
Peter Wright (Scotland); 107.37	6 – 8	(Wales) Gerwyn Price; 106.83
Michael van Gerwen (Netherlands); 102.35	8 – 5	(England) Michael Smith; 99.75
Glen Durrant (England); 102.00	8 – 3	(Northern Ireland) Daryl Gurney; 97.72
Night's Average: 101.96
Highest Checkout: (England) Michael Smith 145
Most 180s: (Scotland) Gary Anderson 6
Night's 180s: 36

=== 2 September – Night 13 (Phase 2) ===
(England) Arena MK, Milton Keynes

	Score	
Glen Durrant (England); 99.31	7 – 7	(England) Michael Smith; 99.14
Daryl Gurney (Northern Ireland); 98.02	6 – 8	(Scotland) Gary Anderson; 100.78
Peter Wright (Scotland); 105.09	8 – 1	(Netherlands) Michael van Gerwen; 91.54
Gerwyn Price (Wales); 93.93	6 – 8	(England) Nathan Aspinall; 99.35
Night's Average: 98.37
Highest Checkout: (Northern Ireland) Daryl Gurney 150
Most 180s: (Scotland) Gary Anderson 7
Night's 180s: 35

=== 3 September – Night 14 (Phase 2) ===
(England) Arena MK, Milton Keynes

	Score	
Gerwyn Price (Wales); 99.21	7 – 7	(Northern Ireland) Daryl Gurney; 97.21
Gary Anderson (Scotland); 102.25	8 – 2	(England) Michael Smith; 89.67
Peter Wright (Scotland); 103.11	8 – 5	(England) Nathan Aspinall; 98.67
Glen Durrant (England); 96.19	7 – 7	(Netherlands) Michael van Gerwen; 98.43
Night's Average: 98.19
Highest Checkout: (Scotland) Gary Anderson 154
Most 180s: (Scotland) Peter Wright and (England) Nathan Aspinall 5
Night's 180s: 28

=== 4 September – Night 15 (Phase 2) ===
(England) Arena MK, Milton Keynes

	Score	
Daryl Gurney (Northern Ireland); 91.15	5 – 8	(England) Nathan Aspinall; 99.24
Glen Durrant (England); 89.11	6 – 8	(Scotland) Peter Wright; 94.80
Gary Anderson (Scotland); 100.33	6 – 8	(Netherlands) Michael van Gerwen; 103.17
Michael Smith (England); 102.50	7 – 7	(Wales) Gerwyn Price; 103.76
Night's Average: 97.87
Highest Checkout: (Wales) Gerwyn Price 164
Most 180s: (England) Michael Smith 9
Night's 180s: 39

=== 5 September – Night 16 (Phase 2) ===
(England) Arena MK, Milton Keynes

	Score	
Gerwyn Price (Wales); 107.70	8 – 3	(Scotland) Gary Anderson; 83.39
Michael van Gerwen (Netherlands); 91.74	2 – 8	(Northern Ireland) Daryl Gurney; 91.04
Peter Wright (Scotland); 96.62	8 – 5	(England) Michael Smith; 94.33
Nathan Aspinall (England); 101.46	8 – 2	(England) Glen Durrant; 100.15
Night's Average: 95.69
Highest Checkout: (Scotland) Gary Anderson and (England) Nathan Aspinall 170
Most 180s: (Wales) Gerwyn Price, (Scotland) Peter Wright and (England) Michael Smith 3
Night's 180s: 16

== Play-offs – 15 October ==
(England) Coventry Arena, Coventry

	Score	
Semi-finals (best of 19 legs)
(England) Glen Durrant; 86.10	10 – 9	(Scotland) Gary Anderson; 87.82
(Scotland) Peter Wright; 94.02	7 – 10	(England) Nathan Aspinall; 95.67
Final (best of 21 legs)
(England) Glen Durrant; 91.84	11 – 8	(England) Nathan Aspinall; 92.15
Night's Total Average: 91.01
Highest Checkout: (England) Nathan Aspinall 141
Most 180s: (England) Nathan Aspinall 13
Night's 180s: 26

== Table and streaks ==
=== Table ===
After the first nine rounds in phase 1, the bottom player in the table is eliminated. In phase 2, the eight remaining players play in a single match on each of the seven nights. The top four players then compete in the knockout semi-finals and final on the playoff night.

The nine challengers are not ranked in the table, but the main nine players can earn league points for a win or draw in the games against them.

Two points are awarded for a win and one point for a draw. When players are tied on points, leg difference is used first as a tie-breaker, after that legs won against throw and then tournament average.

#	Name	Matches					Legs				Scoring					
#	Name	Pld	W	D	L	Pts	LF	LA	+/-	LWAT	100+	140+	180s	A	HC	C%
1	(England) Glen Durrant W	16	8	5	3	21	104	85	+19	36	222	136	35	98.05	167	40.63
2	(Scotland) Peter Wright	16	9	2	5	20	102	84	+18	29	219	135	62	99.66	170	47.00
3	(England) Nathan Aspinall RU	16	9	1	6	19	103	92	+11	36	223	142	61	98.62	170	39.02
4	(Scotland) Gary Anderson	16	8	3	5	19	98	92	+6	36	209	135	52	97.07	170	39.74
5	(Wales) Gerwyn Price	16	6	5	5	17	99	84	+15	33	220	122	45	98.56	164	41.60
6	(Netherlands) Michael van Gerwen	16	8	1	7	17	89	93	–4	28	206	105	43	99.05	144	41.06
7	(England) Michael Smith	16	5	3	8	13	89	96	−7	33	193	110	73	97.20	167	36.33
8	(Northern Ireland) Daryl Gurney	16	4	3	9	11	86	101	−15	31	212	123	41	93.50	164	38.91
9	(England) Rob Cross	9	1	3	5	5	44	58	−14	17	119	69	19	94.61	143	37.61

W = Winner RU = Runner Up

=== Streaks ===
Player	Phase 1, Nights 1 to 9									Phase 2, Nights 10 to 16							Play-offs	
Player	1	2	3	4	5	6	7	8	9	10	11	12	13	14	15	16	SF	F
(England) Glen Durrant	W	D	W	L	W	W	D	W	W	W	D	W	D	D	L	L	W	W
(Scotland) Peter Wright	L	D	W	L	W	W	D	W	W	L	L	L	W	W	W	W	L	—N/a
(England) Nathan Aspinall	W	L	W	W	L	D	W	L	W	L	W	L	W	L	W	W	W	L
(Scotland) Gary Anderson	W	D	L	W	L	D	W	L	W	W	D	W	W	W	L	L	L	—N/a
(Wales) Gerwyn Price	D	D	D	W	L	L	L	W	W	L	W	W	L	D	D	W	—N/a	
(Netherlands) Michael van Gerwen	W	W	L	W	L	W	W	L	L	W	L	W	L	D	W	L	—N/a	
(England) Michael Smith	L	D	W	W	W	L	L	W	L	W	L	L	D	L	D	L	—N/a	
(Northern Ireland) Daryl Gurney	L	L	D	L	D	L	W	W	L	L	W	L	L	D	L	W	—N/a	
(England) Rob Cross	D	W	L	L	D	D	L	L	L	Eliminated								
Challengers	L	D	L	L	W	D	L	L	L	—N/a								

Legend:	W	Win	D	Draw	L	Loss	—N/a	Eliminated

=== Positions by Week ===
Player	Phase 1, Nights 1 to 9									Phase 2, Nights 10 to 16						
Player	1	2	3	4	5	6	7	8	9	10	11	12	13	14	15	16
(England) Glen Durrant	1	2	1	4	1	1	2	1	1	1	1	1	1	1	1	1
(Scotland) Peter Wright	8	7	7	8	7	5	5	3	2	3	4	6	4	3	3	2
(England) Nathan Aspinall	2	5	3	2	4	4	3	4	3	6	2	5	3	4	4	3
(Scotland) Gary Anderson	3	4	8	6	6	6	4	5	5	4	3	2	2	2	2	4
(Wales) Gerwyn Price	6	6	6	3	5	7	7	7	6	7	6	4	6	6	6	5
(Netherlands) Michael van Gerwen	4	1	2	1	3	2	1	2	4	2	5	3	5	5	5	6
(England) Michael Smith	9	8	4	5	2	3	6	6	7	5	7	7	7	7	7	7
(Northern Ireland) Daryl Gurney	7	9	9	9	9	9	9	8	8	8	8	8	8	8	8	8
(England) Rob Cross	5	3	5	7	8	8	8	9	9	Eliminated						
