= 2015 Zuiderduin Masters =

Zuiderduin Masters

Tournament information
- Dates: 4 December 2015 – 6 December 2015
- Venue: Hotel Zuiderduin
- Location: Egmond aan Zee
- Country: North Holland, the Netherlands
- Organisation(s): BDO / WDF
- Format: Legs (group stage); Sets (Knock out stage); Final – best of 9 Sets (men) Final – best of 3 Sets (women)

Champion(s)
- (England) Glen Durrant (men) (England) Fallon Sherrock (women)

The 2015 Zuiderduin Masters is a BDO/WDF darts tournament that took place in Egmond aan Zee, Netherlands.

Glen Durrant defeated Martin Adams in the finals for the men's title.

== Men results ==
=== Men's tournament ===
==== Group stage ====
All matches best of 9 legs. Two points are gained for every match won.
P = Played; W = Won; L = Lost; LF = Legs for; LA = Legs against; +/- = Leg difference; Pts = Points

Group A

Pos	Name	P	W	L	Pts
1	(Wales) Jim Williams	2	2	0	4
2	(Netherlands) Wesley Harms	2	1	1	2
3	(England) James Hurrell	2	0	2	0

Group B

Pos	Name	P	W	L	Pts
1	(England) Brian Dawson	2	1	1	2
2	(England) Andy Fordham	2	1	1	2
3	(England) Jamie Hughes	2	1	1	2

Group C

Pos	Name	P	W	L	Pts
1	(England) Glen Durrant	2	2	0	4
2	(England) Scott Waites	2	1	1	2
3	(Latvia) Madars Razma	2	0	2	0

Group D

Pos	Name	P	W	L	Pts
1	(Wales) Martin Phillips	2	1	1	2
2	(Netherlands) Jeffrey de Graaf	2	1	1	2
3	(England) Pip Blackwell	2	1	1	2

Group E

Pos	Name	P	W	L	Pts
1	(Netherlands) Danny Noppert	2	1	1	2
2	(Netherlands) Frans Harmsen	2	1	1	2
3	(England) Scott Mitchell	2	1	1	2

Group F

Pos	Name	P	W	L	Pts
1	(England) Darryl Fitton	2	1	1	2
2	(Lithuania) Darius Labanauskas	2	1	1	2
3	(Scotland) Ross Montgomery	2	1	1	2

Group G

Pos	Name	P	W	L	Pts
1	(England) Tony O'Shea	2	2	0	4
2	(Belgium) Geert De Vos	2	1	1	2
3	(Netherlands) Remco van Eijden	2	0	2	0

Group H

Pos	Name	P	W	L	Pts
1	(England) Martin Adams	2	2	0	4
2	(Netherlands) Richard Veenstra	2	1	1	2
3	(England) Gary Robson	2	0	2	0

==== Knockout stages ====
Quarter-finals; Best of 5 sets
1	(Wales) Jim Williams	3
8	(England) Brian Dawson	1
4	(England) Glen Durrant	3
5	(Wales) Martin Phillips	0
2	(Netherlands) Danny Noppert	3
7	(England) Darryl Fitton	0
3	(England) Martin Adams	3
6	(England) Tony O'Shea	0

Semi-finals; Best of 5 sets
(England) Glen Durrant	3
(Wales) Jim Williams	1
(England) Martin Adams	3
(Netherlands) Danny Noppert	1

Final; Best of 9 sets
(England) Glen Durrant	5
(England) Martin Adams	2
