= 2017 BDO World Darts Championship =

Tournament information
- Dates: 7–15 January 2017
- Venue: Lakeside Country Club
- Location: Frimley Green, Surrey
- Country: England
- Organisation(s): British Darts Organisation (BDO)
- Format: Sets
- Prize fund: £339,000 (total)
- Winner's share: £100,000 (men) £12,000 (women) £5,000 (youth)
- High checkout: 170; Darryl Fitton; Glen Durrant

Champion(s)
- Glen Durrant (ENG) (Men); Lisa Ashton (ENG) (Women); Justin van Tergouw (NED) (Youth)

The 2017 BDO World Darts Championship (known for sponsorship reasons as the 2017 Lakeside World Professional Darts Championship) was the 40th World Championship organised by the British Darts Organisation, and the 32nd staging at the Lakeside Country Club at Frimley Green.

== Format and qualifiers ==
The cutoff for qualification through the BDO Invitational Tables was on 30 September 2016. Additional qualifiers were determined in playoffs held on 30 November 2016.

=== Men's ===
Top 16 (seeded)

1. (England) Glen Durrant (winner)
2. (England) Scott Mitchell (second round)
3. (Netherlands) Danny Noppert (runner-up)
4. (England) Jamie Hughes (semi-final)
5. (England) Martin Adams (quarter-final)
6. (England) Scott Waites (quarter-final)
7. (Wales) Dean Reynolds (first round)
8. (Lithuania) Darius Labanauskas (quarter-final)
9. (Netherlands) Wesley Harms (first round)
10. (England) Darryl Fitton (semi-final)
11. (England) Mark McGeeney (second round)
12. (England) Brian Dawson (first round)
13. (Wales) Jim Williams (second round)
14. (Netherlands) Richard Veenstra (second round)
15. (Belgium) Geert De Vos (quarter-final)
16. (Wales) Martin Phillips (first round)

17–24 in BDO rankings (first round)

17. (England) Tony O'Shea (first round)
18. (Scotland) Ross Montgomery (first round)
19. (Netherlands) Wouter Vaes (first round)
20. (Wales) Nick Kenny (first round)
21. (England) Pip Blackwell (second round)
22. (England) James Hurrell (first round)
23. (England) Conan Whitehead (first round)
24. (England) Martin Atkins (first round)

25–26 in BDO rankings (preliminary round)

25. (England) Dennis Harbour (first round)
26. (Netherlands) Jimmy Hendriks (preliminary round)

2016 finalist not in top 26 (preliminary round)

1. (Canada) Jeff Smith (second round)

Regional table qualifiers (preliminary round)

1. (Japan) Seigo Asada (preliminary round)
2. (Australia) Raymond Smith (first round)
3. (Sweden) Dennis Nilsson (preliminary round)
4. (England) Ryan Joyce (first round)
5. (Canada) David Cameron (first round)
6. (Poland) Krzysztof Ratajski (second round)
7. (New Zealand) Craig Caldwell (preliminary round)
8. (United States) Tom Sawyer (preliminary round)
9. (Belgium) Roger Janssen (preliminary round)

Playoff qualifiers (preliminary round)

1. (England) Paul Hogan (second round)
2. (Netherlands) Willem Mandigers (preliminary round)
3. (New Zealand) Mark McGrath (first round)
4. (Belgium) Davy Van Baelen (preliminary round)

=== Women's ===
Top 8 (seeded)

1. (England) Deta Hedman (first round)
2. (England) Lisa Ashton (winner)
3. (Netherlands) Aileen de Graaf (semi-final)
4. (Russia) Anastasia Dobromyslova (semi-final)
5. (England) Lorraine Winstanley (quarter-final)
6. (England) Trina Gulliver (quarter-final)
7. (England) Fallon Sherrock (quarter-final)
8. (Australia) Corrine Hammond (runner-up)

9–14 in BDO rankings

9. (Netherlands) Sharon Prins (first round)
10. (Wales) Rhian Griffiths (first round)
11. (Netherlands) Anca Zijlstra (first round)
12. (England) Rachel Brooks (first round)
13. (England) Casey Gallagher (quarter-final)
14. (England) Claire Brookin (first round)

Playoff qualifiers

1. (Scotland) Olive Byamukama (first round)
2. (Canada) Patricia Farrell (first round)

== Draw bracket ==
=== Men ===
==== Preliminary round ====
All matches are the first to 3 sets.

Av.	Player	Score	Player	Av.
81.69	(Q) Dennis Nilsson (Sweden)	0 – 3	(England) Ryan Joyce (Q)	90.18
86.70	(Q) Seigo Asada (Japan)	1 – 3	(Canada) Jeff Smith (WC)	84.63
77.37	(Q) Roger Janssen (Belgium)	2 – 3	(New Zealand) Mark McGrath (Q)	81.60
72.69	(Q) Tom Sawyer (United States)	0 – 3	(England) Paul Hogan (Q)	85.65
88.05	(Q) Krzysztof Ratajski (Poland)	3 – 2	(Netherlands) Willem Mandigers (Q)	87.48
80.31	(Q) Raymond Smith (Australia)	3 – 2	(Belgium) Davy Van Baelen (Q)	83.55
86.19	(Q) David Cameron (Canada)	3 – 1	(Netherlands) Jimmy Hendriks	86.40
79.74	(Q) Craig Caldwell (New Zealand)	1 – 3	(England) Dennis Harbour	81.99

==== Last 32 ====
First Round (best of 5 sets); 7–10 January
1	(England) Glen Durrant 96.96	3
(Wales) Nick Kenny 92.64	1
16	(Wales) Martin Phillips 83.61	2
Q	(England) Paul Hogan 91.62	3
8	(Lithuania) Darius Labanauskas 91.74	3
(England) Conan Whitehead 83.46	1
9	(Netherlands) Wesley Harms 84.27	0
Q	(Poland) Krzysztof Ratajski 84.15	3
5	(England) Martin Adams 91.74	3
Q	(England) Ryan Joyce 87.87	2
12	(England) Brian Dawson 87.24	2
WC	(Canada) Jeff Smith 91.71	3
4	(England) Jamie Hughes 94.38	3
(England) Martin Atkins 88.69	1
13	(Wales) Jim Williams 82.62	3
(England) Tony O'Shea 76.47	0
2	(England) Scott Mitchell 87.81	3
Q	(New Zealand) Mark McGrath 78.54	0
15	(Belgium) Geert De Vos 96.90	3
Q	(Australia) Raymond Smith 92.19	0
7	(Wales) Dean Reynolds 79.26	2
(England) Pip Blackwell 81.36	3
10	(England) Darryl Fitton 85.26	3
(Netherlands) Wouter Vaes 79.65	0
6	(England) Scott Waites 90.54	3
(England) Dennis Harbour 89.28	1
11	(England) Mark McGeeney 90.96	3
(England) James Hurrell 87.75	1
3	(Netherlands) Danny Noppert 98.06	3
Q	(Canada) David Cameron 86.77	1
14	(Netherlands) Richard Veenstra 91.47	3
(Scotland) Ross Montgomery 86.25	1

Second Round (best of 7 sets); 11–12 January
1	(England) Glen Durrant 89.85	4
Q	(England) Paul Hogan 92.01	3
8	(Lithuania) Darius Labanauskas 89.37	4
Q	(Poland) Krzysztof Ratajski 86.76	3
5	(England) Martin Adams 89.94	4
WC	(Canada) Jeff Smith 89.31	1
4	(England) Jamie Hughes 84.96	4
13	(Wales) Jim Williams 89.85	1
2	(England) Scott Mitchell 89.94	2
15	(Belgium) Geert De Vos 92.28	4
(England) Pip Blackwell 83.73	1
10	(England) Darryl Fitton 87.75	4
6	(England) Scott Waites 88.14	4
11	(England) Mark McGeeney 87.03	2
3	(Netherlands) Danny Noppert 91.02	4
14	(Netherlands) Richard Veenstra 87.93	0

Quarter-finals (best of 9 sets); 13 January
1	(England) Glen Durrant 89.82	5
8	(Lithuania) Darius Labanauskas 87.15	2
5	(England) Martin Adams 92.55	4
4	(England) Jamie Hughes 91.89	5
15	(Belgium) Geert De Vos 87.12	4
10	(England) Darryl Fitton 89.97	5
6	(England) Scott Waites 94.41	3
3	(Netherlands) Danny Noppert 95.58	5

Semi-finals (best of 11 sets); 14 January
1	(England) Glen Durrant 96.27	6
4	(England) Jamie Hughes 96.93	1
10	(England) Darryl Fitton 95.73	3
3	(Netherlands) Danny Noppert 93.57	6

Final (best of 13 sets); 15 January
1	(England) Glen Durrant 93.48	7
3	(Netherlands) Danny Noppert 93.30	3

=== Women ===
First Round (best of 3 sets); 7–11 January
1	(England) Deta Hedman 73.62	3	2	0
(England) Casey Gallagher 79.86	2	3	3
8	(Australia) Corrine Hammond 70.44	3	3
Q	(Canada) Patricia Farrell 61.26	1	0
4	(Russia) Anastasia Dobromyslova 85.50	0	3	3
(Wales) Rhian Griffiths 86.46	3	0	1
5	(England) Lorraine Winstanley 74.52	3	3
(Netherlands) Anca Zijlstra 63.51	0	0
2	(England) Lisa Ashton 87.06	3	3
(Netherlands) Sharon Prins 74.70	2	0
7	(England) Fallon Sherrock 78.39	3	3
Q	(Scotland) Olive Byamukama 69.87	1	0
3	(Netherlands) Aileen de Graaf 76.44	3	3
(England) Rachel Brooks 70.26	0	1
6	(England) Trina Gulliver 72.00	3	3
(England) Claire Brookin 66.12	2	1

Quarter-finals (best of 3 sets); 12 January
(England) Casey Gallagher 68.85	2	2
8	(Australia) Corrine Hammond 70.08	3	3
4	(Russia) Anastasia Dobromyslova 82.20	3	1	3
5	(England) Lorraine Winstanley 71.76	0	3	1
2	(England) Lisa Ashton 81.12	3	3
7	(England) Fallon Sherrock 76.05	1	2
3	(Netherlands) Aileen de Graaf 69.78	3	3
6	(England) Trina Gulliver 63.99	1	2

Semi-finals (best of 3 sets); 13 January
8	(Australia) Corrine Hammond 72.33	3	3
4	(Russia) Anastasia Dobromyslova 77.04	2	2
2	(England) Lisa Ashton 85.44	3	3
3	(Netherlands) Aileen de Graaf 75.24	0	1

Final (best of 5 sets); 14 January
8	(Australia) Corrine Hammond 73.53	0	2	1
2	(England) Lisa Ashton 81.81	3	3	3

=== Youth ===
For the third consecutive year, a youth final was played on the Lakeside stage during the Championships. In November 2016, the Youth tournament was played down to the final two. The final took place on 12 January, and was contested between 14 year old Nathan Girvan from Scotland and 16 year old Justin van Tergouw from the Netherlands. The format was first to three sets.

Justin van Tergouw was crowned champion, after only dropping one leg and recording a 3–0 victory, whilst throwing a three dart average of 88.20.

Av.	Player	Score	Player	Av.
74.55	Nathan Girvan (Scotland)	0 – 3	(Netherlands) Justin van Tergouw	88.20

== TV coverage ==
Channel 4 signed a 2-year deal to broadcast both the men's and women's World Championship. Channel 4 showed afternoon games and the first semi final. BT Sport showed the evening games and the second semi final. The final was shown on both channels.

Outside of the United Kingdom, live coverage of all matches was provided by YouTube on the BDO's own channel.

=== Channel 4 ===
It was announced in December 2016 that Rob Walker would present Channel 4's World Darts coverage. He was joined in the studio by analysts Deta Hedman and Paul Nicholson. Bobby George also featured in Channel 4's coverage, however, unlike the BBC where he was their main pundit, he instead did 'special features'. Reporters for the tournament were Seema Jaswal and Danny Crates. In a similar arrangement that the BBC had with BT Sport, they shared commentary teams. This was led by John Rawling who was joined by Vassos Alexander and Jim Proudfoot in the commentary booth.

Channel 4 had the rights to all afternoon sessions, the first men's semi final, and shared coverage of the men's final.

=== BT Sport ===
BT Sport broadcast their 3rd BDO World Darts Championships. Ray Stubbs, who presented BT Sport's coverage of darts since its inception, moved to Talksport 2 and was replaced by Matt Smith. He was joined in the studio alongside two-time Lakeside semi finalist Chris Mason who acted as their analyst throughout the championships. They shared the same commentary team as Channel 4 which was led by John Rawling, with Vassos Alexander and Jim Proudfoot also in the commentary box, alongside Mason and Paul Nicholson. Reshmin Chowdury was BT Sport's roving reporter from the Lakeside once again. BT Sport broadcast each evening session, the 2nd men's semi final and shared coverage of the final.
