= Glen Durrant =

English darts player (born 1970)

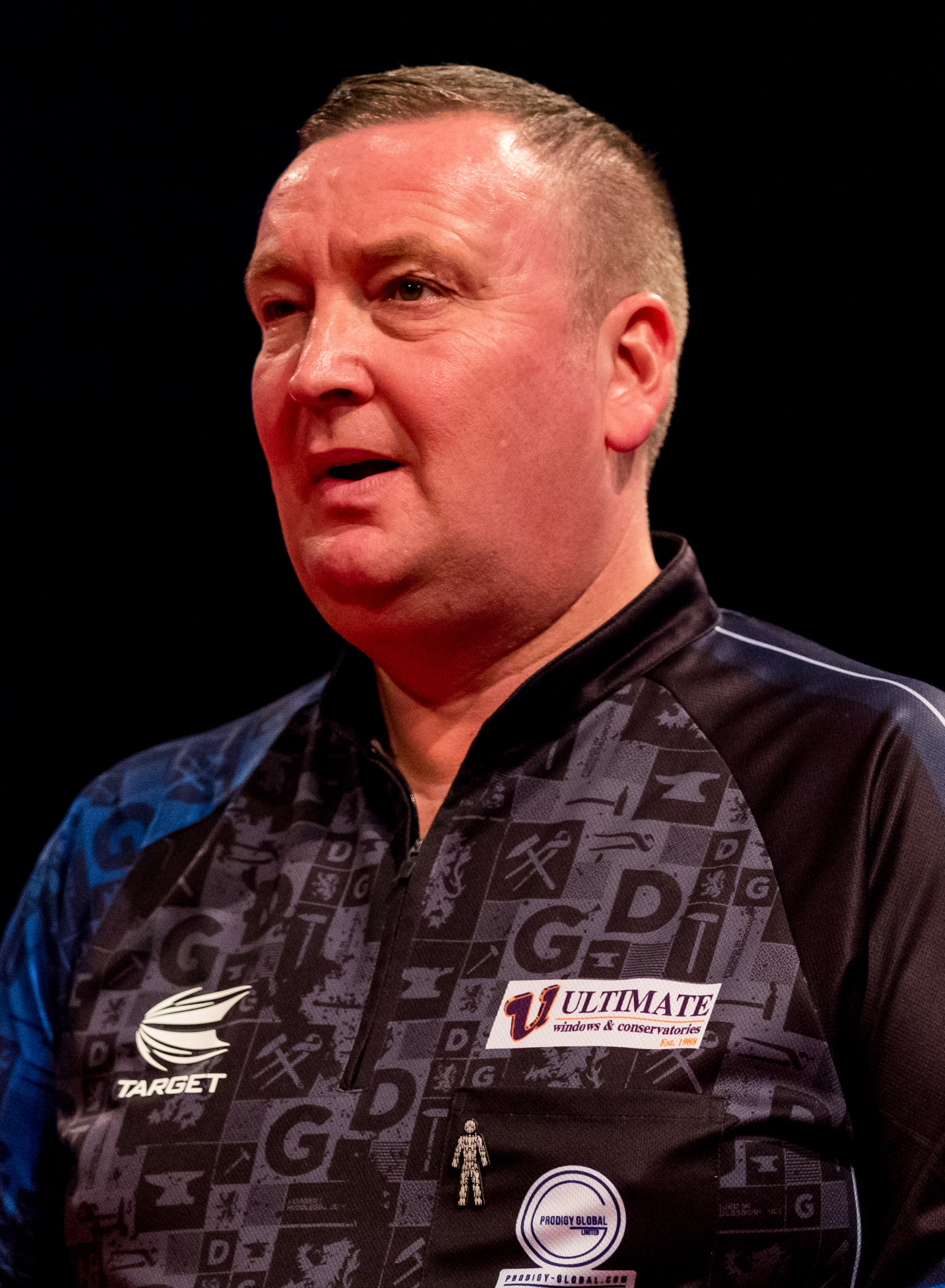
- Durrant in 2019

Personal information
- Full name: Glen Thomas Durrant
- Nickname: "Duzza"
- Born: 24 November 1970 (age 55) Middlesbrough, England
- Home town: Ormesby, Middlesbrough, England

Sport
- Sport: Darts
- Playing since: 1985
- Darts: 24g Target Signature
- Laterality: Right-handed
- Walk-on music: "Reach Up (Papa's Got a Brand New Pigbag)" by Perfecto Allstarz "Pump It Up!" by Endor

Organisation (see split in darts)
- BDO: 2004–2019
- PDC: 2019–2022 (Tour Card 2019–2022)

WDF major events – best performances
- World Championship: Winner (3): 2017, 2018, 2019
- World Masters: Winner (2): 2015, 2016
- World Trophy: Winner (1): 2018
- Finder Masters: Winner (3): 2015, 2016, 2018

PDC premier events – best performances
- World Championship: Quarter-final: 2020
- World Matchplay: Semi-final: 2019, 2020
- World Grand Prix: Semi-final: 2019
- UK Open: Last 64: 2020, 2021, 2022
- Grand Slam: Semi-final: 2019
- European Championship: Last 32: 2019
- Premier League: Winner (1): 2020
- PC Finals: Last 16: 2019
- Masters: Last 24: 2021
- World Series Finals: Quarter-final: 2020

WSDT major events – best performances
- World Championship: Last 32: 2023, 2024
- World Matchplay: Last 16: 2023
- World Masters: Last 16: 2024

Other tournament wins
- Years
BDO Gold Cup	2016
Belgium Open	2018
British Classic	2016
Denmark Masters	2016, 2017
Denmark Open	2015
England Classic	2012, 2013, 2015
England Masters	2016
England Matchplay	2015, 2016, 2017, 2018
England Open	2016
European Darts Open	2016
Isle of Man Classic	2015
Isle of Man Open	2018
Jersey Open	2012
Northern Ireland Open	2013, 2014
Swedish Open	2016
Welsh Open	2015, 2017
Winmau Wolverhampton Classic	2017
WDF Europe Cup Team	2016
WDF World Cup Team	2015
Players Championships (x2)
2019 (x2)

Glen Thomas Durrant (born 24 November 1970), nicknamed "Duzza", is an English former professional darts player who competed in British Darts Organisation (BDO) and Professional Darts Corporation (PDC) events. Durrant is a three-time BDO World Champion, having won the title in consecutive years: 2017, 2018 and 2019. Durrant also won six other BDO major titles: the 2018 BDO World Trophy, the World Masters in 2015 and 2016, and the Finder Darts Masters in 2015, 2016 and 2018.

Durrant won a PDC Tour Card in 2019 and won 2 PDC ranking titles that year before winning the 2020 Premier League, his only PDC major title. Subsequently, his form declined and he retired from professional darts in 2022. He now works as a commentator on Sky Sports and for the MODUS Super Series.

== BDO ==
=== Early career ===
Although he began playing in 1985, Durrant's first major appearance was in the 2004 Winmau World Masters, where he lost out in the early stages to Dietmar Burger. He would have more success the following year however. Two consecutive 3-0 wins put him in the last 32 and this was followed by a 3–1 win over Anthony Miera, to set up a last 16 match against Martin Adams. Durrant almost pulled off a famous victory but lost out 2–3.

Durrant has appeared in the PDC's UK Open on three occasions. In 2005, he won his opening match against Darren Moulsley before losing a deciding leg against Ray Cornibert in the last 64. In 2009, Durrant defeated Graham Usher and John McGuirk before losing out to Terry Jenkins 1–9. Durrant also qualified for the UK Open in 2012 by winning the Riley's qualifier in Middlesbrough. He drew a fellow Riley's qualifier in Stephen Bunting and lost 0–4 in the preliminary round.

=== 2011–2014 ===
In 2011, Durrant made his third appearance in the Winmau World Masters. Four consecutive wins and losing only three legs put him into the televised stages of the tournament where he defeated Craig Baxter 3–2 in sets in the last 24. In the last 16, he faced 2000 world champion John Walton. A 3–1 win in sets saw an emotional Durrant set up a rematch against Martin Adams, where Adams won 3–1.

Durrant came within one match of qualifying for the World Championship in 2012, but was beaten in the final round by Alan Norris who went on to reach the quarter-finals.

Durrant is a dominant force locally in his own Teesside area and has won the Teesside darts championship 3 times in the last 4 years.

He threw his first competitive nine-dart finish in the England Darts Organisations Grosvenor Casino Tyneside Classic. This was part of a dramatic comeback from 0–4, to win 5–4, against England teammate Garry Thompson in the last 16.

The first major International open tournament win for Durrant came in September 2012, when he recorded victories against Martin Adams, Robbie Green and Martin Atkins, amongst others, before defeating Scott Waites in the final to win the 2012 EDO England Classic and the £3000 first prize. At the same tournament he "did the double" by winning the pairs competition with his playing partner Tony Eccles and also was runner up in the inaugural EDO England Matchplay. After adding the 2012 Jersey Open, Durrant retained the England Classic in 2013.

Durrant made his debut at the World Championship in 2014 as a seeded player. He defeated qualifier Mike Day 3–0 in the first round before losing 4–1 to Norris.

Durrant reached the semi-finals of the Masters in 2014. He survived six match darts en route including four against Scott Mitchell in the quarter-finals (the other two were against Brian Dawson in a previous round), before losing in a deciding leg against eventual champion Martin Phillips having missed one match dart at the bullseye. Durrant then lost to Mitchell in the final of the Jersey Open, televised on Eurosport, having led 5–3 in a race to six and missed three match darts.

=== 2015–2019 ===
Durrant's reached the last four of the 2015 World Championship, maintaining a 90+ average in each of his first three wins over Karel Sedláček, Jamie Hughes and Darryl Fitton. In the semi-final, Martin Adams defeated Durrant 6–5, despite Durrant having led 5–4 and missing one match dart to win 6–4, and then leading the deciding set 2–0 in legs and missing two further match darts. The match was lauded as one of the best in the history of the tournament as Durrant averaged 99.57 to Adams' 97.92 and they hit 12 ton+ finishes between them. After the world championships, Durrant approached renowned sports mind coach Stephen McKibben from Northern Ireland, who was accredited with leading Scott Mitchell to world glory. He has worked with Stephen ever since and it has enabled him to win his majors and dominate the BDO world tour.

Durrant had a fine 2015 on the BDO Circuit and has picked up the English Classic, English Matchplay, Welsh Open, Denmark Open and Isle of Man classic titles, and was finalist in the Scottish Open, Isle of Man Open, English Open and British Classic. He also helped his country to win the WDF World Cup team title.

Durrant won his first major title with the 2015 World Masters title, after showing superb form throughout the tournament. He defeated the former World Matchplay champion, Larry Butler, 7–3 in the final. Durrant mentioned about how much working with Stephen has changed him from a nearly man to a major winner.

His second major BDO title came in December when he won the 2015 Zuiderduin Masters, beating Martin Adams 5–2 in sets in the final and averaging 100.69.

Durrant entered the 2016 World Championship as the favourite to win the tournament, and won his first two matches without dropping a set, defeating Dean Reynolds and Larry Butler. In the quarter-final, the 2013 world champion and eventual winner, Scott Waites, defeated Durrant 5–4, despite Durrant leading 3–1 and 4–2 in sets and being 2–0 up in legs during the seventh set.

Durrant entered the 2017 BDO World Darts Championship as the number 1 seed and won the tournament for the first time, beating Danny Noppert in the final 7–3. Durrant had a pressure filled tournament, and contacted his mind coach Stephen McKibben after a near miss against Paul Hogan. Durrant excelled in the rest of the tournament, dominating his remaining games.

In 2018, Durannt retained the BDO World Darts Championship, edging out Mark McGeeney 7–6 in a tie-break final after McGeeney missed two championship darts. Through the year he won the BDO World Trophy for the first time, lost in the final of the Winmau World Masters and won the Finder Darts Masters, meaning he had reached the final of all four BDO majors and won three of them.

Despite being the reigning Lakeside champion. Durrant was seeded number 2 for the 2019 BDO World Darts Championship and defeated Mark McGrath, Scott Baker, Kyle McKinstry, Jim Williams and Scott Waites in the final to once again retain the championship. He is the only player since Eric Bristow to win the championship three years in a row.

== PDC ==
=== 2019 ===
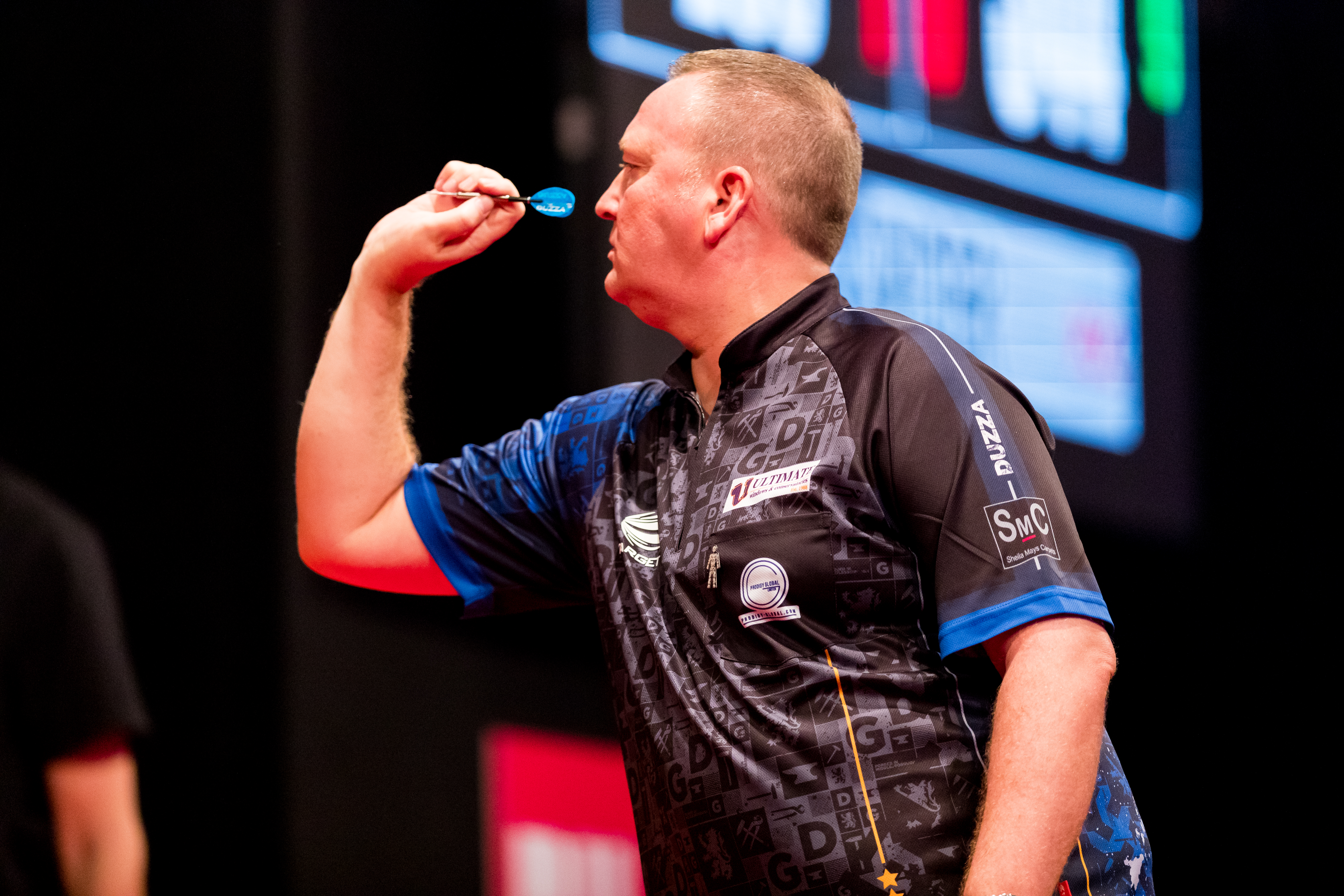
Durrant during the 2019 European Darts Matchplay

On 15 November 2018, Durrant announced his intentions to enter the PDC Q-School in January regardless of his performance in the BDO World Championship due to there being no penalties from the BDO, unlike previous years. He lost in the last 128 round at the first two days of Q School to Darren Herewini and Vince Tipple, collecting two points on the Q School Order or Merit. Durrant did better on the third day, but lost at the final hurdle to Reece Robinson.

On 21 January 2019, Durrant survived match darts from Matthew Dennant before going on to reach the last 16 to seal his two-year PDC Tour Card via the UK Q-School Order of Merit.

Following Gary Anderson's withdrawal from the 2019 Premier League, Durrant was selected as one of nine 'contenders' to replace him. He would play a one-off match against Daryl Gurney on night two in Glasgow which he lost 7–3.

At the second PDC Players Championship event in 2019, Durrant made his first PDC final after he beat Joe Cullen 7–4 in the semi-final. He hit a 170 checkout to stay in the match against Dave Chisnall, but eventually lost the final 8–7. The following week, Durrant would claim his first PDC title in just his fourth Pro Tour event, dispatching Dimitri Van den Bergh 8–3 in the final. On 18 May 2019, Durrant clinched his second PDC title at Players Championship 15 after a series of impressive performances on the day, beating Darius Labanauskas 8–1 in the final, having already dismissed World number 1 Michael van Gerwen 7–2 in the semi-final. At the World Matchplay in July, Durrant advanced to the semi-finals, a run which included wins over Adrian Lewis, van Gerwen and James Wade.

=== 2020 ===
On his debut at the 2020 PDC World Darts Championship, Durrant lost 5–1 in the quarter-finals to Gerwyn Price.

In October 2020, Durrant won the 2020 Premier League on his debut appearance in the tournament, beating Nathan Aspinall in the final after surviving four match darts against Anderson in the semis. Durrant also topped the league phase, making him the third player to do so after van Gerwen the previous seven years and Phil Taylor the eight years previously. Two weeks after winning the Premier League, Durrant contracted COVID-19, forcing him to miss a couple of tournaments.

=== 2021 ===
At the 2021 PDC World Darts Championship, Durrant lost 4–3 in the fourth round to Dirk van Duijvenbode. Durrant was selected to compete in the 2021 Premier League Darts, but endured a nightmare defence, losing all 9 of his matches, and being eliminated with 2 matches to spare. Durrant's struggles continued, as he suffered first-round defeats at both the 2021 World Matchplay and the 2021 World Grand Prix, posting a 58.02 average in defeat to José de Sousa at the latter tournament.

=== 2022 ===
At the 2022 PDC World Darts Championship, Durrant suffered a 3–0 whitewash to William O'Connor in the second round. He appeared on Eggheads with Keegan Brown on 1 November 2022. Durrant reached the fourth round of the UK Open, but failed to qualify for any other PDC major that year. After failing to qualify for the 2023 World Championship, Durrant tweeted: "Well that's it I'm no longer a professional dart player", though he later clarified that he was not retiring, he was just no longer a professional.

=== 2024 ===
During the 2024 PDC World Championship Durrant was a commentator on matches broadcast on Sky Sports.

== World Championship results ==
=== BDO World Championship ===
- 2014: Second round (lost to Alan Norris 1–4)
- 2015: Semi-finals (lost to Martin Adams 5–6)
- 2016: Quarter-finals (lost to Scott Waites 4–5)
- 2017: Winner (beat Danny Noppert 7–3)
- 2018: Winner (beat Mark McGeeney 7–6)
- 2019: Winner (beat Scott Waites 7–3)

=== PDC World Championship ===
- 2020: Quarter-finals (lost to Gerwyn Price 1–5)
- 2021: Fourth round (lost to Dirk van Duijvenbode 3–4)
- 2022: Second round (lost to William O'Connor 0–3)

=== World Seniors Championship ===
- 2023: First round (lost to Mark Dudbridge 0–3)
- 2024: First round (lost to Mark Dudbridge 2–3)

== Career finals ==
=== BDO major finals: 10 (9 titles) ===
Legend
World Championship (3–0)
Winmau World Masters (2–1)
Zuiderduin Masters (3–0)
BDO World Trophy (1–0)

Outcome	No.	Year	Championship	Opponent in the final	Score (Note: (l) = score in legs, (s) = score in sets, (m) = matches won.)
Winner	1.	2015	Winmau World Masters (1)	(United States) Larry Butler	7–3 (s)
Winner	2.	2015	Zuiderduin Masters (1)	(England) Martin Adams	5–2 (s)
Winner	3.	2016	Winmau World Masters (2)	(England) Mark McGeeney	6–3 (s)
Winner	4.	2016	Zuiderduin Masters (2)	(England) Jamie Hughes	5–3 (s)
Winner	5.	2017	World Championship (1)	(Netherlands) Danny Noppert	7–3 (s)
Winner	6.	2018	World Championship (2)	(England) Mark McGeeney	7–6 (s)
Winner	7.	2018	BDO World Trophy	(Germany) Michael Unterbuchner	10–7 (l)
Runner-up	1.	2018	Winmau World Masters	(England) Adam Smith-Neale	4–6 (s)
Winner	8.	2018	Zuiderduin Masters (3)	(Netherlands) Richard Veenstra	5–3 (s)
Winner	9.	2019	World Championship (3)	(England) Scott Waites	7–3 (s)

=== PDC major finals: 1 (1 title) ===
Legend
Premier League (1–0)

Outcome	No.	Year	Championship	Opponent in the final	Score
Winner	1.	2020	Premier League	Nathan Aspinall	11–8 (l)

== Performance timeline ==
=== BDO ===
Tournament	2004	2005	2011	2012	2013	2014	2015	2016	2017	2018	2019
BDO Ranked televised events
World Championship	DNQ					2R	SF	QF	W	W	W
World Trophy	Not held					1R	QF	2R	QF	W	PDC
World Masters	Prel.	4R	QF	5R	6R	SF	W	W	QF	F	PDC
Finder Masters	DNQ						W	W	RR	W	NH

=== PDC ===
Tournament	2005	2009	2012	2016	2017	2018	2019	2020	2021	2022
PDC Ranked televised events
World Championship	Non-PDC							QF	4R	2R
UK Open	2R	3R	Prel.	DNQ			3R	4R	4R	4R
World Matchplay	Non-PDC						SF	SF	1R	DNQ
World Grand Prix	Non-PDC						SF	1R	1R	DNQ
European Championship	NH	Non-PDC					1R	WD	DNQ	
Grand Slam	NH	DNQ		2R	QF	RR	SF	RR	DNQ	
Players Championship Finals	NH	Non-PDC					3R	1R	DNQ	
PDC Non-ranked televised events
Premier League	Non-PDC						C	W	10th	DNP
Masters	NYF			Non-PDC				DNQ	1R	DNQ
World Series Finals	Not held			Non-PDC			DNQ	QF	DNQ	
Season-end ranking (PDC)	Non-PDC						22	13	31	80

==== European Tour ====
Season	1	2	3	4	5	6	7	8	9	10	11	12	13
2019	EDO; 2R	GDC; DNQ	GDG; 2R	GDO; DNQ	ADO; DNQ	EDG; 1R	DDM; QF	DDO; 1R	CDO; 2R	ADC; DNQ	EDM; QF	IDO; SF	GDT; 3R
2020	BDC; 2R	GDC; 3R	EDG; 3R	IDO; WD									

==== Players Championships ====
Season	1	2	3	4	5	6	7	8	9	10	11	12	13	14	15	16	17	18	19	20	21	22	23	24	25	26	27	28	29	30
2019	WIG; 1R	WIG; F	WIG; 1R	WIG; W	BAR; 4R	BAR; 2R	WIG; 3R	WIG; 3R	BAR; 3R	BAR; 3R	BAR; QF	BAR; QF	BAR; 3R	BAR; 4R	BAR; W	BAR; 1R	WIG; 3R	WIG; 2R	BAR; 4R	BAR; 1R	HIL; 1R	HIL; QF	BAR; QF	BAR; 4R	BAR; 1R	BAR; 4R	DUB; 2R	DUB; F	BAR; 3R	BAR; 1R
2020	BAR; 3R	BAR; 3R	WIG; QF	WIG; 4R	WIG; QF	WIG; 3R	BAR; 4R	BAR; 4R	MIL; QF	MIL; QF	MIL; 1R	MIL; 4R	MIL; 2R	NIE; QF	NIE; 2R	NIE; 4R	NIE; 3R	NIE; 3R	COV; 1R	COV; 1R	COV; 3R	COV; 1R	COV; 1R							
2021	BOL; 2R	BOL; 2R	BOL; QF	BOL; 2R	MIL; 2R	MIL; 2R	MIL; 1R	MIL; 1R	NIE; DNP	NIE; DNP	NIE; DNP	NIE; DNP	MIL; 1R	MIL; 1R	MIL; 1R	MIL; DNP	COV; 1R	COV; 1R	COV; 2R	COV; 1R	BAR; 1R	BAR; 1R	BAR; 1R	BAR; 1R	BAR; 1R	BAR; DNP	BAR; DNP	BAR; 1R	BAR; DNP	BAR; DNP
2022	BAR; 1R	BAR; 1R	WIG; 1R	WIG; 1R	BAR; 1R	BAR; 1R	NIE; 1R	NIE; 1R	BAR; 3R	BAR; 1R	BAR; 1R	BAR; 1R	BAR; 1R	WIG; 1R	WIG; 1R	NIE; 1R	NIE; 1R	BAR; 1R	BAR; 1R	BAR; DNP	BAR; DNP	BAR; 1R	BAR; 1R	BAR; 1R	BAR; 1R	BAR; 1R	BAR; 1R	BAR; DNP	BAR; 1R	BAR; 1R

Performance Table Legend
W	Won the tournament	F	Finalist	SF	Semifinalist	QF	Quarterfinalist	#R; RR; Prel.	Lost in # round Round-robin; Preliminary round	DQ	Disqualified
DNQ	Did not qualify	DNP	Did not participate	WD	Withdrew	NH	Tournament not held	#R; RR; Prel.	Lost in # round Round-robin; Preliminary round	NYF	Not yet founded
