= Brian Dawson (darts player) =

English darts player

Personal information
- Nickname: "Doggy"
- Born: 12 December 1968 (age 57) Thurnscoe, England
- Home town: Barnsley, England

Sport
- Sport: Darts
- Playing since: 1980
- Darts: 23 Gram
- Laterality: Right-handed
- Walk-on music: "Now Is the Time" by Jimmy James and the Vagabonds

Organisation (see split in darts)
- BDO: 2009–2020
- PDC: 2020–

WDF major events – best performances
- World Championship: Quarter Final: 2015
- World Masters: Last 16: 2016
- World Trophy: Last 16: 2016
- Finder Masters: Quarter Final: 2015

PDC premier events – best performances
- UK Open: Last 128: 2017

WSDT major events – best performances
- World Matchplay: Last 16: 2022

Other tournament wins
- Tournament: Years
- BDO Gold Cup German Masters: 2015; 2019

Brian "Doggy" Dawson (born 12 December 1968) is an English professional darts player currently playing in Professional Darts Corporation (PDC) events.

== Career ==
Dawson began to see success in the 2014–15 season as he qualified for the televised stages of the Winmau World Masters, losing narrowly to Glen Durrant after having match darts. Dawson then debuted at the World Championship and reached the quarter-finals, after victories against Seigo Asada, Madars Razma, and Jeffrey de Graaf. He was eventually defeated by fourth seed Scott Mitchell, who went on to win the tournament. In 2017 Dawson was called up to the British International Championships for the second time.

== World Championship results ==
=== BDO ===
- 2015: Quarter-finals (lost to Scott Mitchell 2–5)
- 2016: 2nd round (lost to Jeff Smith 1–4)
- 2017: 1st round (lost to Jeff Smith 2–3)

== Performance timeline ==
Tournament	2014	2015	2016	2017	2018
BDO World Championship	DNQ	QF	2R	1R	DNQ
BDO World Trophy	DNQ		2R	1R	DNQ
Winmau World Masters	L32	L32	L16	L272	
Zuiderduin Masters	DNQ	QF	RR	DNQ	

Performance Table Legend
DNP	Did not play at the event	DNQ	Did not qualify for the event	NYF	Not yet founded	#R	lost in the early rounds of the tournament (WR = Wildcard round, RR = Round robin)
QF	lost in the quarter-finals	SF	lost in the semi-finals	RU	lost in the final	W	won the tournament
