= Olive Byamukama =

Personal information
- Nickname: Olive Oyl
- Born: 31 August 1975 (age 51) Kampala, Uganda
- Home town: Inverness, Scotland

Sport
- Sport: Darts
- Playing since: 2002
- Darts: 22 Gram
- Walk-on music: "Take On Me" by A-ha

Organisation (see split in darts)
- BDO: 2010, 2011, 2016-2017

WDF major events – best performances
- World Championship: Last 16: 2017
- World Masters: Last 16: 2010

Olive Byamukama is a former Ugandan-born Scottish professional darts player who played in British Darts Organisation events.

== Career ==
Byamukama reached the Last 16 of the World Masters in 2010. In 2011 she reached the Quarter-final of the BDO Gold Cup. She qualified for the 2017 BDO World Darts Championship, facing Fallon Sherrock in the last 16, which she lost 2–0.

== World Championship results ==
=== BDO ===
- 2017: Last 16 (lost to Fallon Sherrock 0–2) (sets)
