= 2019 World Grand Prix (darts) =

2019 BoyleSports World Grand Prix

Tournament information
- Dates: 6–12 October 2019
- Venue: Citywest Hotel
- Location: Dublin, Ireland
- Organisation(s): Professional Darts Corporation (PDC)
- Format: Sets "Double in, Double out"
- Prize fund: £450,000
- Winner's share: £110,000
- High checkout: 170; Michael van Gerwen; Mervyn King; Dave Chisnall

Champion(s)
- Michael van Gerwen (NED)

The 2019 BoyleSports World Grand Prix was the 22nd staging of the World Grand Prix. It was held from 6 to 12 October 2019 at the Citywest Hotel in Dublin, Ireland.

Michael van Gerwen was the defending champion, after defeating Peter Wright 5–2 in the 2018 final, and he successfully defended the Grand Prix for the first time, winning the title for the fifth time overall with a 5–2 win against Dave Chisnall in the final.

== Prize money ==
The total prize money increased from £400,000 to £450,000.

The following is the breakdown of the fund:

Position (num. of players)		Prize money (Total: £450,000)
Winner	(1)	£110,000
Runner-up	(1)	£50,000
Semi-finalists	(2)	£25,000
Quarter-finalists	(4)	£16,000
Second round losers	(8)	£10,000
First round losers	(16)	£6,000

== Qualification ==
The field of 32 players included the top 16 on the PDC Order of Merit and the top 16 non-qualified players from the ProTour Order of Merit; the top eight players seeded for the tournament.

PDC Order of Merit (1–16) (Top 8 seeded)

1. (Netherlands) Michael van Gerwen (champion)
2. (England) Rob Cross (second round)
3. (Northern Ireland) Daryl Gurney (first round)
4. (Scotland) Gary Anderson (second round)
5. (England) Michael Smith (second round)
6. (Wales) Gerwyn Price (first round)
7. (Scotland) Peter Wright (second round)
8. (England) James Wade (second round)
9. (Austria) Mensur Suljović (first round)
10. (England) Ian White (quarter-finals)
11. (England) Dave Chisnall (runner-up)
12. (Australia) Simon Whitlock (first round)
13. (England) Nathan Aspinall (quarter-finals)
14. (Wales) Jonny Clayton (first round)
15. (England) Adrian Lewis (first round)
16. (England) Joe Cullen (first round)

Pro Tour

1. (Poland) Krzysztof Ratajski (first round)
2. (England) Glen Durrant (semi-finals)
3. (Netherlands) Jermaine Wattimena (quarter-finals)
4. (England) Jamie Hughes (first round)
5. (Netherlands) Jeffrey de Zwaan (second round)
6. (England) Ricky Evans (first round)
7. (England) Steve Beaton (first round)
8. (England) Keegan Brown (first round)
9. (England) Chris Dobey (semi-finals)
10. (England) Stephen Bunting (second round)
11. (Netherlands) Danny Noppert (second round)
12. (Germany) Max Hopp (first round)
13. (Scotland) John Henderson (first round)
14. (Netherlands) Vincent van der Voort (first round)
15. (England) Mervyn King (quarter-finals)
16. (Belgium) Dimitri Van den Bergh (first round)

== Draw ==
First round (best of 3 sets); 6–7 October
1	(Netherlands) Michael van Gerwen 84.59	2
(England) Jamie Hughes 85.08	1
(Netherlands) Jeffrey de Zwaan 88.67	2
(England) Steve Beaton 73.68	0
8	(England) James Wade 86.15	2
(Scotland) John Henderson 82.79	1
(England) Mervyn King 88.03	2
(Belgium) Dimitri Van den Bergh 84.95	1
5	(England) Michael Smith 83.39	2
(Australia) Simon Whitlock 77.96	1
(England) Joe Cullen 84.44	1
(England) Ian White 85.95	2
4	(Scotland) Gary Anderson 84.26	2
(England) Keegan Brown 81.50	0
(England) Ricky Evans 79.08	0
(England) Chris Dobey 89.50	2
2	(England) Rob Cross 87.75	2
(Austria) Mensur Suljović 84.70	1
(England) Glen Durrant 84.90	2
(Poland) Krzysztof Ratajski 84.94	1
7	(Scotland) Peter Wright 80.82	2
(Germany) Max Hopp 79.49	0
(England) Adrian Lewis 82.14	1
(Netherlands) Jermaine Wattimena 78.59	2
6	(Wales) Gerwyn Price 79.69	1
(England) Dave Chisnall 92.50	2
(England) Stephen Bunting 77.88	2
(Wales) Jonny Clayton 73.42	0
3	(Northern Ireland) Daryl Gurney 84.04	0
(Netherlands) Danny Noppert 79.60	2
(Netherlands) Vincent van der Voort 65.32	0
(England) Nathan Aspinall 92.04	2

Second round (best of 5 sets); 8–9 October
1	(Netherlands) Michael van Gerwen 94.79	3
(Netherlands) Jeffrey de Zwaan 74.87	0
8	(England) James Wade 78.59	1
(England) Mervyn King 85.83	3
5	(England) Michael Smith 76.98	1
(England) Ian White 86.29	3
4	(Scotland) Gary Anderson 82.99	1
(England) Chris Dobey 85.77	3
2	(England) Rob Cross 86.44	2
(England) Glen Durrant 85.30	3
7	(Scotland) Peter Wright 83.12	1
(Netherlands) Jermaine Wattimena 88.85	3
(England) Dave Chisnall 86.35	3
(England) Stephen Bunting 70.82	0
(Netherlands) Danny Noppert 80.75	2
(England) Nathan Aspinall 87.26	3

Quarter-finals (best of 5 sets); 10 October
1	(Netherlands) Michael van Gerwen 94.64	3
(England) Mervyn King 87.74	1
(England) Ian White 76.99	2
(England) Chris Dobey 90.13	3
(England) Glen Durrant 85.42	3
(Netherlands) Jermaine Wattimena 83.60	2
(England) Dave Chisnall 90.00	3
(England) Nathan Aspinall 93.26	1

Semi-finals (best of 7 sets); 11 October
1	(Netherlands) Michael van Gerwen 91.41	4
(England) Chris Dobey 83.56	0
(England) Glen Durrant 87.20	1
(England) Dave Chisnall 91.17	4

Final (best of 9 sets); 12 October
1	(Netherlands) Michael van Gerwen 94.74	5
(England) Dave Chisnall 93.32	2
