= 2019 World Matchplay =

2019 Betfred World Matchplay

Tournament information
- Dates: 20–28 July 2019
- Venue: Winter Gardens
- Location: Blackpool, England
- Organisation(s): Professional Darts Corporation (PDC)
- Format: Legs
- Prize fund: £700,000
- Winner's share: £150,000
- High checkout: 170; Peter Wright; Rob Cross

Champion(s)
- Rob Cross (ENG)

The 2019 Betfred World Matchplay was the 26th annual staging of the World Matchplay, organised by the Professional Darts Corporation. The tournament took place at the Winter Gardens, Blackpool, from 20–28 July 2019.

Gary Anderson was the defending champion, after defeating Mensur Suljović 21–19 after extra time in the longest final in the tournament's history. However, he lost to Mervyn King 11–8 in the second round.

Rob Cross won his first World Matchplay title with an 18–13 win over Michael Smith in the final. He also became just the fourth player in history to win both the PDC World Championship and the World Matchplay.

== Prize money ==
The prize fund rose from £500,000 to £700,000, with the winner's earnings being up from £115,000 in 2018 to £150,000.

Position (no. of players)		Prize money (Total: £700,000)
Winner	(1)	£150,000
Runner-up	(1)	£70,000
Semi-finalists	(2)	£50,000
Quarter-finalists	(4)	£25,000
Second round	(8)	£15,000
First round	(16)	£10,000

== Format ==
In previous stagings of the event all games had to be won by two clear legs with no sudden-death legs. However, after consulting the host broadcaster Sky Sports in 2013, the PDC decided that games would now only proceed for a maximum of six extra legs before a tie-break leg is required. For example, in a first to 10 legs first round match, if the score reached 12-12 then the 25th leg would be the decider.

== Qualification ==
The top 16 players on the PDC Order of Merit as of 30 June 2019 were seeded for the tournament. The top 16 players on the ProTour Order of Merit, not to have already qualified on the cut-off date were unseeded.

The following players qualified for the tournament:

=== PDC Order of Merit ===
1. (Netherlands) Michael van Gerwen (second round)
2. (England) Rob Cross (champion)
3. (Northern Ireland) Daryl Gurney (semi-finals)
4. (Scotland) Gary Anderson (second round)
5. (England) Michael Smith (runner-up)
6. (Scotland) Peter Wright (quarter-finals)
7. (Wales) Gerwyn Price (first round)
8. (England) James Wade (quarter-finals)
9. (Austria) Mensur Suljović (second round)
10. (England) Ian White (second round)
11. (Australia) Simon Whitlock (second round)
12. (England) Dave Chisnall (first round)
13. (England) Nathan Aspinall (first round)
14. (Wales) Jonny Clayton (first round)
15. (England) Darren Webster (first round)
16. (England) Adrian Lewis (first round)

=== PDC ProTour qualifiers ===
1. (Poland) Krzysztof Ratajski (second round)
2. (England) Ricky Evans (first round)
3. (England) Glen Durrant (semi-finals)
4. (England) Joe Cullen (first round)
5. (England) Steve Beaton (first round)
6. (England) Stephen Bunting (quarter-finals)
7. (Netherlands) Jermaine Wattimena (first round)
8. (England) Jamie Hughes (first round)
9. (Netherlands) Jeffrey de Zwaan (first round)
10. (England) Chris Dobey (first round)
11. (Netherlands) Danny Noppert (first round)
12. (Germany) Max Hopp (second round)
13. (England) Mervyn King (quarter-finals)
14. (Scotland) John Henderson (first round)
15. (England) Keegan Brown (second round)
16. (Netherlands) Vincent van der Voort (first round)

== Draw ==
First round (best of 19 legs); 20–22 July
1	(Netherlands) Michael van Gerwen 93.00	10
(England) Steve Beaton 89.86	6
16	(England) Adrian Lewis 94.69	4
(England) Glen Durrant 101.05	10
8	(England) James Wade 96.16	13
(Netherlands) Jeffrey de Zwaan 95.26	12
9	(Austria) Mensur Suljović 96.76	10
(Netherlands) Jermaine Wattimena 82.02	1
5	(England) Michael Smith 98.78	10
(England) Jamie Hughes 97.54	7
12	(England) Dave Chisnall 97.69	9
(Germany) Max Hopp 94.71	11
4	(Scotland) Gary Anderson 93.75	10
(Netherlands) Danny Noppert 87.77	6
13	(England) Nathan Aspinall 102.96	5
(England) Mervyn King 100.55	10
2	(England) Rob Cross 100.60	10
(England) Chris Dobey 91.34	3
15	(England) Darren Webster 88.61	5
(Poland) Krzysztof Ratajski 89.23	10
7	(Wales) Gerwyn Price 92.02	12
(England) Stephen Bunting 95.11	13
10	(England) Ian White 98.24	10
(England) Joe Cullen 88.63	0
6	(Scotland) Peter Wright 102.04	10
(Netherlands) Vincent van der Voort 97.40	5
11	(Australia) Simon Whitlock 94.99	10
(Scotland) John Henderson 101.33	8
3	(Northern Ireland) Daryl Gurney 96.34	10
(England) Ricky Evans 89.33	7
14	(Wales) Jonny Clayton 93.46	8
(England) Keegan Brown 95.59	10

Second round (best of 21 legs); 23–24 July
1	(Netherlands) Michael van Gerwen 98.67	11
(England) Glen Durrant 99.33	13
8	(England) James Wade 93.86	13
9	(Austria) Mensur Suljović 92.91	11
5	(England) Michael Smith 96.72	12
(Germany) Max Hopp 92.98	10
4	(Scotland) Gary Anderson 94.95	8
(England) Mervyn King 94.88	11
2	(England) Rob Cross 98.47	11
(Poland) Krzysztof Ratajski 94.45	5
(England) Stephen Bunting 92.82	14
10	(England) Ian White 94.63	12
6	(Scotland) Peter Wright 103.01	11
11	(Australia) Simon Whitlock 87.42	2
3	(Northern Ireland) Daryl Gurney 93.44	11
(England) Keegan Brown 92.44	9

Quarter-finals (best of 31 legs); 25–26 July
(England) Glen Durrant 92.84	16
8	(England) James Wade 85.68	7
5	(England) Michael Smith 96.54	16
(England) Mervyn King 88.37	11
2	(England) Rob Cross 101.83	16
(England) Stephen Bunting 96.08	14
6	(Scotland) Peter Wright 104.57	13
3	(Northern Ireland) Daryl Gurney 101.86	16

Semi-finals (best of 33 legs); 27 July
(England) Glen Durrant 94.16	10
5	(England) Michael Smith 100.77	17
2	(England) Rob Cross 96.64	17
3	(Northern Ireland) Daryl Gurney 92.46	15

Final (best of 35 legs); 28 July
5	(England) Michael Smith 95.91	13
2	(England) Rob Cross 95.16	18

== Statistics ==
Player	Eliminated	Played	Legs Won	Legs Lost	100+	140+	180s	High checkout	3-dart average	Checkout success
(England) Rob Cross	Winner	5	72	50	140	84	34	170	98.14	43.90%
(England) Michael Smith	Runner up	5	68	56	141	99	33	147	97.61	38.42%
(England) Glen Durrant	Semi-finals	4	49	39	98	55	22	137	97.08	44.55%
(Northern Ireland) Daryl Gurney	Semi-finals	4	52	46	140	65	36	124	94.63	32.31%
(Scotland) Peter Wright	Quarter-finals	3	34	23	105	64	15	170	102.53	48.84%
(England) Mervyn King	Quarter-finals	3	32	29	60	48	12	160	94.60	42.67%
(England) Stephen Bunting	Quarter-finals	3	41	40	94	59	22	120	93.97	39.71%
(England) James Wade	Quarter-finals	3	33	39	106	47	12	160	91.90	43.42%
(England) Ian White	Second round	2	22	14	34	28	14	121	96.44	32.35%
(Netherlands) Michael van Gerwen	Second round	2	21	19	41	25	11	134	95.84	32.81%
(Austria) Mensur Suljović	Second round	2	21	14	51	25	8	101	94.84	42.00%
(Scotland) Gary Anderson	Second round	2	18	17	35	25	10	160	94.35	35.29%
(England) Keegan Brown	Second round	2	19	19	45	17	8	148	94.02	40.43%
(Germany) Max Hopp	Second round	2	21	21	66	27	10	128	93.85	42.86%
(Poland) Krzysztof Ratajski	Second round	2	15	16	36	23	3	160	91.84	45.45%
(Australia) Simon Whitlock	Second round	2	12	19	38	12	7	124	91.21	46.15%
(England) Nathan Aspinall	First round	1	5	10	17	3	4	127	102.96	26.32%
(Scotland) John Henderson	First round	1	8	10	24	16	4	97	101.33	47.06%
(England) Dave Chisnall	First round	1	9	11	26	9	10	81	97.69	29.03%
(England) Jamie Hughes	First round	1	7	10	25	13	2	128	97.54	36.84%
(Netherlands) Vincent van der Voort	First round	1	5	10	21	12	2	52	97.40	31.25%
(Netherlands) Jeffrey de Zwaan	First round	1	12	13	28	21	6	119	95.26	37.50%
(England) Adrian Lewis	First round	1	4	10	15	8	6	80	94.69	40.00%
(Wales) Jonny Clayton	First round	1	8	10	23	13	2	101	93.46	44.44%
(Wales) Gerwyn Price	First round	1	12	13	23	11	6	106	92.02	51.17%
(England) Chris Dobey	First round	1	3	10	17	5	2	145	91.34	33.33%
(England) Steve Beaton	First round	1	6	10	22	6	4	46	89.86	35.29%
(England) Ricky Evans	First round	1	7	10	20	8	2	85	89.33	58.33%
(England) Joe Cullen	First round	1	0	10	8	6	2	—N/a	88.63	00.00%
(England) Darren Webster	First round	1	5	10	18	12	1	105	88.61	33.33%
(Netherlands) Danny Noppert	First round	1	6	10	16	10	2	86	87.77	31.58%
(Netherlands) Jermaine Wattimena	First round	1	1	10	9	3	3	32	82.02	14.29%

Source: Match reports from the draw.
