= 2019 Premier League Darts =

Darts competition

2019 Unibet Premier League Darts

Tournament information
- Dates: 7 February - 23 May 2019

Champion(s)
- Michael van Gerwen (NED)

The 2019 Unibet Premier League Darts was a darts tournament organised by the Professional Darts Corporation – the fifteenth edition of the tournament. The event began on Thursday 7 February at the Newcastle Arena in Newcastle and ended with the Play-offs at The O2 Arena in London on Thursday 23 May. It was also the last to feature Raymond van Barneveld, as he retired from professional darts after the following World Darts Championship, although he returned in 2022. He appeared a record 14 times in the competition.

Michael van Gerwen was the three-time defending champion after defeating Michael Smith 11–4 in the 2018 final. He won a fourth consecutive (and fifth overall) title by defeating Rob Cross 11–5 in the final.

== Format ==
The tournament format was modified for this season.

Phase 1: During the first nine nights, eight of the nine players play each other in four matches and the ninth player plays one match against one of the nine contenders. At the end of Phase 1, the bottom player is eliminated from the competition.

Phase 2: In the seven nights of weeks 9 to 15, each player plays the other seven players once. In a change from previous years, all players only play one match each night. Phase 2 matches have been increased to a maximum of fourteen legs, allowing for a 7-7 draw. In previous years, the maximum number of legs was twelve. At the end of Phase 2, the bottom four players in the league table are eliminated from the competition.

Play-off Night: The top four players in the league table contest the two knockout semi-finals with 1st playing 4th and 2nd playing 3rd. The semi-finals are first to 10 legs (best of 19). The two winning semi-finalists meet in the final which is first to 11 legs (best of 21).

== Venues ==
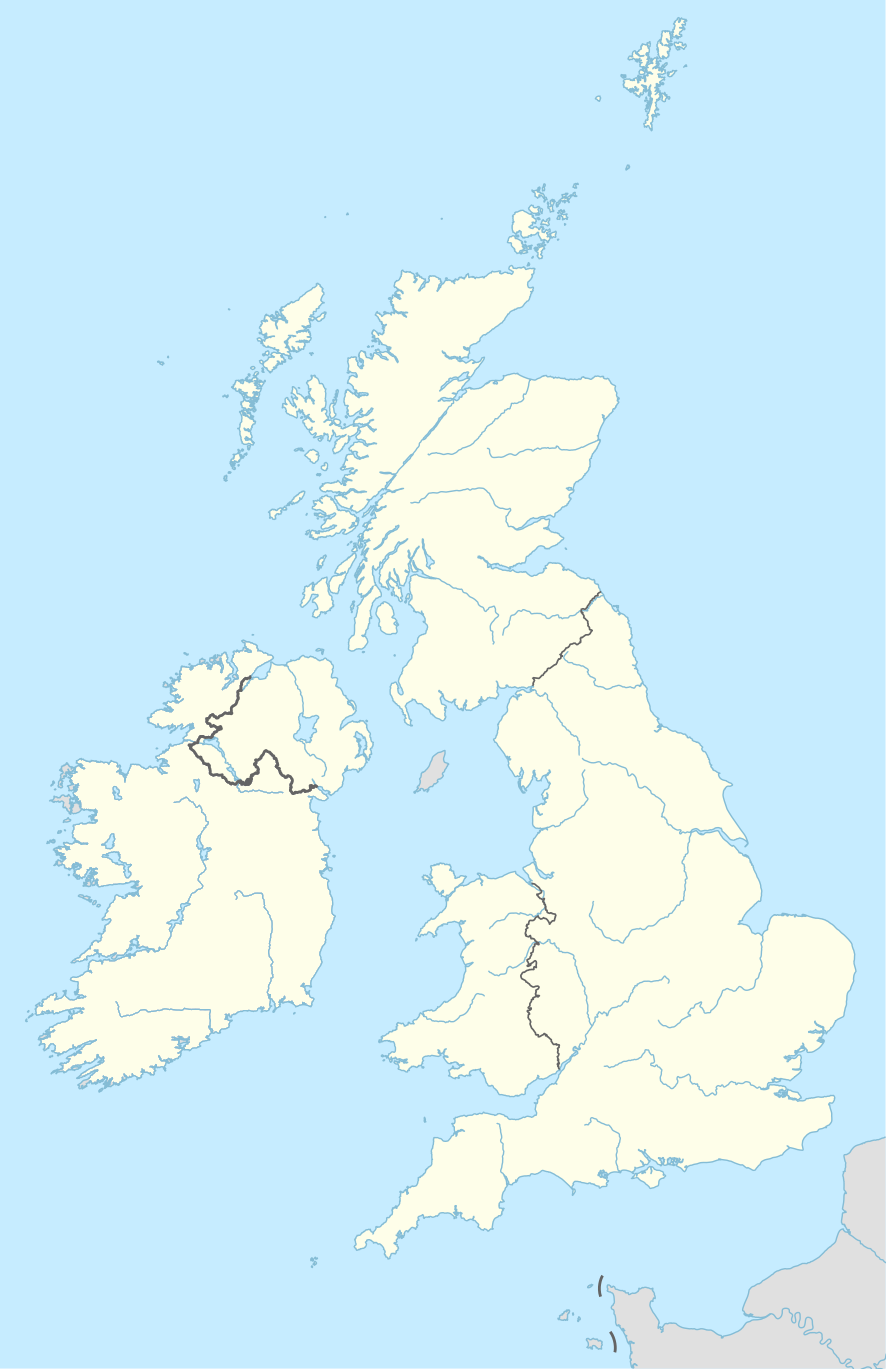
Locations of the 2019 Premier League venues in the U.K. and Ireland.
Other locations of the 2019 Premier League venues in Europe.

(England) Newcastle	(Scotland) Glasgow	(Republic of Ireland) Dublin	(England) Exeter
Newcastle Arena; Thursday 7 February	SSE Hydro; Thursday 14 February	3Arena; Thursday 21 February	Westpoint Exeter; Thursday 28 February
(Scotland) Aberdeen	(England) Nottingham	(Germany) Berlin	(Netherlands) Rotterdam
AECC Arena; Thursday 7 March	Nottingham Arena; Thursday 14 March	Mercedes-Benz Arena; Thursday 21 March	Rotterdam Ahoy; Wednesday 27 & Thursday 28 March
(Northern Ireland) Belfast	(England) Liverpool	(Wales) Cardiff	(England) Birmingham
SSE Arena Belfast; Thursday 4 April	Liverpool Arena; Thursday 11 April	Cardiff International Arena; Thursday 18 April	Arena Birmingham; Thursday 25 April
(England) Manchester	(England) Sheffield	(England) Leeds	(England) London
Manchester Arena; Thursday 2 May	Sheffield Arena; Thursday 9 May	Leeds Arena; Thursday 16 May	The O_{2} Thursday 23 May

== Players ==
The players in this year's tournament were announced following the 2019 PDC World Darts Championship final on 1 January, with the top four of the PDC Order of Merit joined by six Wildcards.

Gary Anderson, who qualified as fourth on the Order of Merit, withdrew on 4 February, three days prior to the tournament beginning, with a back injury.

Player	Appearance in Premier League	Consecutive Streak	Order of Merit Rank	Previous best performance	Qualification
(Netherlands) Michael van Gerwen	7th	7	1	Winner (2013, 2016, 2017, 2018)	PDC Order of Merit
(England) Rob Cross	2nd	2	2	Semi-final (2018)	PDC Order of Merit
(Scotland) Peter Wright	6th	6	3	Runner-up (2017)	PDC Order of Merit
(Northern Ireland) Daryl Gurney	2nd	2	5	5th (2018)	PDC Wildcard
(England) Michael Smith	3rd	2	6	Runner-up (2018)	PDC Wildcard
(Wales) Gerwyn Price	2nd	2	7	10th (2018)	PDC Wildcard
(England) James Wade	10th	1	10	Winner (2009)	PDC Wildcard
(Austria) Mensur Suljović	2nd	2	8	9th (2018)	Sky Sports Wildcard
(Netherlands) Raymond van Barneveld	14th	14	28	Winner (2014)	Sky Sports Wildcard

Nine invited players were chosen to appear on each of the nine Phase 1 nights in the slots which were available as a result of Anderson's withdrawal. The nine main players could earn league points if they won or drew against the invited players. The invited players would not earn any points in the competition.

Player	Venue	Order of Merit Rank
(England) Chris Dobey	Newcastle	35
(England) Glen Durrant	Glasgow	74
(Republic of Ireland) Steve Lennon	Dublin	36
(England) Luke Humphries	Exeter	56
(Scotland) John Henderson	Aberdeen	19
(England) Nathan Aspinall	Nottingham	34
(Germany) Max Hopp	Berlin	30
(Belgium) Dimitri Van den Bergh	Rotterdam (27 March)	33
(Netherlands) Jeffrey de Zwaan	Rotterdam (28 March)	43

== Prize money ==
The prize money for the 2019 tournament was set to increase to £855,000 from £825,000 in 2018. As the contenders picked up four draws between them it ended up being a total of £851,500.

Stage	Prize money
Winner	£250,000
Runner-up	£120,000
Semi-finalists (x2)	£80,000
5th place	£70,000
6th place	£60,000
7th place	£55,000
8th place	£50,000
9th place	£35,000
'Contenders' win (x0)	£5,000
'Contenders' draw (x4)	£3,500
'Contenders' lose (x5)	£2,500
League Winner Bonus	£25,000
Total	£825,000

== League stage ==
Players in italics are "Contenders", and will only play on that night.

=== 7 February – Week 1 (Phase 1) ===
(England) Utilita Arena, Newcastle

	Score	
James Wade (England); 99.24	7–4	(Netherlands) Raymond van Barneveld; 95.15
Gerwyn Price (Wales); 104.11	7–4	(Northern Ireland) Daryl Gurney; 98.78
Chris Dobey (England); 98.53	6–6	(Austria) Mensur Suljović; 100.99
Michael van Gerwen (Netherlands); 104.98	7–5	(England) Michael Smith; 95.23
Peter Wright (Scotland); 101.56	6–6	(England) Rob Cross; 103.57
Night's Average: 100.19
Highest Checkout: (England) Michael Smith 150
Most 180s: (Wales) Gerwyn Price and (England) Chris Dobey 6
Night's 180s: 37

=== 14 February – Week 2 (Phase 1) ===
(Scotland) SSE Hydro, Glasgow

	Score	
Peter Wright (Scotland); 88.95	6–6	(England) Michael Smith; 97.61
Rob Cross (England); 102.58	7–4	(England) James Wade; 100.81
Raymond van Barneveld (Netherlands); 88.79	6–6	(Wales) Gerwyn Price; 95.60
Daryl Gurney (Northern Ireland); 100.05	7–3	(England) Glen Durrant; 99.89
Mensur Suljović (Austria); 101.07	3–7	(Netherlands) Michael van Gerwen; 99.82
Night's Average: 97.09
Highest Checkout: (Northern Ireland) Daryl Gurney 121 (x2)
Most 180s: (England) Michael Smith 6
Night's 180s: 29

=== 21 February – Week 3 (Phase 1) ===
(Republic of Ireland) 3Arena, Dublin

	Score	
Gerwyn Price (Wales); 96.22	6–6	(England) James Wade; 103.89
Steve Lennon (Republic of Ireland); 90.80	5–7	(Scotland) Peter Wright; 96.95
Michael van Gerwen (Netherlands); 101.34	7–2	(England) Rob Cross; 93.31
Michael Smith (England); 93.18	5–7	(Northern Ireland) Daryl Gurney; 99.14
Mensur Suljović (Austria); 94.50	6–6	(Netherlands) Raymond van Barneveld; 91.65
Night's Average: 95.95
Highest Checkout: (Northern Ireland) Daryl Gurney 140
Most 180s: (England) James Wade and (Wales) Gerwyn Price 5
Night's 180s: 33

=== 28 February – Week 4 (Phase 1) ===
(England) Westpoint Arena, Exeter

	Score	
Luke Humphries (England); 101.30	6–6	Gerwyn Price; 99.48
Daryl Gurney (Northern Ireland); 90.35	1–7	(England) Rob Cross; 102.16
Mensur Suljović (Austria); 98.27	7–4	(Scotland) Peter Wright; 97.23
Michael van Gerwen (Netherlands); 94.33	3–7	(England) James Wade; 95.65
Michael Smith (England); 98.79	7–4	(Netherlands) Raymond van Barneveld; 94.38
Night's Average: 97.30
Highest Checkout: (England) Luke Humphries 161
Most 180s: (Scotland) Peter Wright 5
Night's 180s: 24

=== 7 March – Week 5 (Phase 1) ===
(Scotland) BHGE Arena, Aberdeen

	Score	
Michael Smith (England); 100.21	3–7	(England) Rob Cross; 103.96
Daryl Gurney (Northern Ireland); 94.45	0–7	(England) James Wade; 109.59
Mensur Suljović (Austria); 95.55	3–7	(Wales) Gerwyn Price; 93.13
Raymond van Barneveld (Netherlands); 95.36	3–7	(Scotland) Peter Wright; 106.64
Michael van Gerwen (Netherlands); 103.91	6–6	(Scotland) John Henderson; 97.38
Night's Average: 99.88
Highest Checkout: (England) Rob Cross 164
Most 180s: (Scotland) John Henderson 6
Night's 180s: 21

=== 14 March – Week 6 (Phase 1) ===
(England) Motorpoint Arena Nottingham, Nottingham

	Score	
Nathan Aspinall (England); 88.35	2–7	(England) Michael Smith; 93.99
James Wade (England); 97.05	3–7	(Austria) Mensur Suljović; 101.38
Rob Cross (England); 101.21	7–3	(Netherlands) Raymond van Barneveld; 91.22
Gerwyn Price (Wales); 92.15	2–7	(Netherlands) Michael van Gerwen; 96.07
Peter Wright (Scotland); 102.91	6–6	(Northern Ireland) Daryl Gurney; 94.98
Night's Average: 96.07
Highest Checkout: (England) Nathan Aspinall 158
Most 180s: (Austria) Mensur Suljović 6
Night's 180s: 28

=== 21 March – Week 7 (Phase 1) ===
(Germany) Mercedes-Benz Arena, Berlin

	Score	
Gerwyn Price (Wales); 98.17	4–7	(England) Rob Cross; 104.33
James Wade (England); 98.42	6–6	(Scotland) Peter Wright; 98.93
Michael van Gerwen (Netherlands); 98.54	5–7	(Northern Ireland) Daryl Gurney; 98.71
Michael Smith (England); 85.34	2–7	(Austria) Mensur Suljović; 96.44
Max Hopp (Germany); 88.41	3–7	(Netherlands) Raymond van Barneveld; 90.00
Night's Average: 95.93
Highest Checkout: (Netherlands) Raymond van Barneveld 170
Most 180s: (Netherlands) Michael van Gerwen 6
Night's 180s: 35

=== 27 March – Week 8A (Phase 1) ===
(Netherlands) Rotterdam Ahoy, Rotterdam

	Score	
Gerwyn Price (Wales); 93.15	5–7	(England) Michael Smith; 93.87
James Wade (England); 103.35	6–6	(Belgium) Dimitri Van den Bergh; 100.73
Rob Cross (England); 92.83	5–7	(Austria) Mensur Suljović; 88.71
Peter Wright (Scotland); 87.34	1–7	(Netherlands) Michael van Gerwen; 100.74
Raymond van Barneveld (Netherlands); 81.96	1–7	(Northern Ireland) Daryl Gurney; 89.84
Night's Average: 93.52
Highest Checkout: (Wales) Gerwyn Price 141
Most 180s: (England) James Wade 7
Night's 180s: 25

=== 28 March – Week 8B (Phase 1) ===
(Netherlands) Rotterdam Ahoy, Rotterdam

	Score	
Daryl Gurney (Northern Ireland); 98.28	7–3	(Austria) Mensur Suljović; 91.58
Peter Wright (Scotland); 87.60	5–7	(Wales) Gerwyn Price; 94.47
Rob Cross (England); 94.46	7–4	(Netherlands) Jeffrey de Zwaan; 96.63
Raymond van Barneveld (Netherlands); 84.68	1–7	(Netherlands) Michael van Gerwen; 101.39
James Wade (England); 102.44	7–4	(England) Michael Smith; 99.39
Night's Average: 95.06
Highest Checkout: (Scotland) Peter Wright 160
Most 180s: (England) Rob Cross 8
Night's 180s: 36

=== 4 April – Week 9 (Phase 2) ===
(Northern Ireland) SSE Arena Belfast, Belfast

	Score	
Mensur Suljović (Austria); 93.69	8–6	(England) James Wade; 85.76
Michael Smith (England); 100.78	7–7	(Scotland) Peter Wright; 90.95
Rob Cross (England); 104.71	8–4	(Northern Ireland) Daryl Gurney; 95.96
Michael van Gerwen (Netherlands); 102.32	7–7	(Wales) Gerwyn Price; 98.73
Night's Average: 96.25
Highest Checkout: (England) James Wade 137
Most 180s: (Austria) Mensur Suljović 5
Night's 180s: 22

=== 11 April – Week 10 (Phase 2) ===
(England) M&S Bank Arena, Liverpool

	Score	
Rob Cross (England); 102.03	8–5	(Scotland) Peter Wright; 100.28
Gerwyn Price (Wales); 89.24	8–5	(Austria) Mensur Suljović; 88.80
James Wade (England); 90.17	7–7	(Northern Ireland) Daryl Gurney; 104.05
Michael Smith (England); 100.42	3–8	(Netherlands) Michael van Gerwen; 109.11
Night's Average: 98.97.35
Highest Checkout: (England) Rob Cross 140
Most 180s: (Northern Ireland) Daryl Gurney 6
Night's 180s: 26

=== 18 April – Week 11 (Phase 2) ===
(Wales) Motorpoint Arena Cardiff, Cardiff

	Score	
Mensur Suljović (Austria); 92.45	8–5	(Northern Ireland) Daryl Gurney; 91.42
Rob Cross (England); 94.49	2–8	(Netherlands) Michael van Gerwen; 107.87
Michael Smith (England); 99.11	5–8	(Wales) Gerwyn Price; 98.43
Peter Wright (Scotland); 85.48	2–8	(England) James Wade; 94.32
Night's Average: 95.26
Highest Checkout: (Wales) Gerwyn Price and (England) Michael Smith 170
Most 180s: (England) Michael Smith 5
Night's 180s: 18

=== 25 April – Week 12 (Phase 2) ===
(England) Arena Birmingham, Birmingham

	Score	
Mensur Suljović (Austria); 100.13	7–7	(England) Michael Smith; 101.25
Rob Cross (England); 97.81	7–7	(Wales) Gerwyn Price; 101.18
Daryl Gurney (Northern Ireland); 99.34	8–4	(Scotland) Peter Wright; 96.04
James Wade (England); 103.66	7–7	(Netherlands) Michael van Gerwen; 106.78
Night's Average: 100.80
Highest Checkout: (Scotland) Peter Wright 124
Most 180s: (England) Michael Smith 7
Night's 180s: 25

=== 2 May – Week 13 (Phase 2) ===
(England) Manchester Arena, Manchester

	Score	
Rob Cross (England); 102.54	8–1	(England) Michael Smith; 97.65
Peter Wright (Scotland); 89.49	6–8	(Austria) Mensur Suljović; 93.91
Daryl Gurney (Northern Ireland); 95.58	8–5	(Netherlands) Michael van Gerwen; 95.22
James Wade (England); 94.30	8–4	(Wales) Gerwyn Price; 89.00
Night's Average: 94.20
Highest Checkout: (Austria) Mensur Suljović 144
Most 180s: (England) Rob Cross 5
Night's 180s: 19

=== 9 May – Week 14 (Phase 2) ===
(England) FlyDSA Arena, Sheffield

	Score	
Michael Smith (England); 95.77	7–7	(England) James Wade; 92.80
Mensur Suljović (Austria); 98.59	4–8	(England) Rob Cross; 102.66
Daryl Gurney (Northern Ireland); 94.71	7–7	(Wales) Gerwyn Price; 96.93
Michael van Gerwen (Netherlands); 110.85	8–1	(Scotland) Peter Wright; 102.29
Night's Average: 98.34
Highest Checkout: (England) James Wade 161
Most 180s: (England) Rob Cross 7
Night's 180s: 25

=== 16 May – Week 15 (Phase 2) ===
(England) First Direct Arena, Leeds

	Score	
Gerwyn Price (Wales); 98.58	8–3	(Scotland) Peter Wright; 95.61
Daryl Gurney (Northern Ireland); 101.80	8–3	(England) Michael Smith; 100.66
Michael van Gerwen (Netherlands); 97.73	8–5	(Austria) Mensur Suljović; 96.50
James Wade (England); 94.40	8–6	(England) Rob Cross; 92.39
Night's Average: 96.88
Highest Checkout: (Wales) Gerwyn Price 142
Most 180s: (Wales) Gerwyn Price and (Northern Ireland) Daryl Gurney 5
Night's 180s: 25

== Play-offs – 23 May ==
(England) The O2 Arena, London

	Score	
Semi-finals (best of 19 legs)
Michael van Gerwen (Netherlands); 96.48	10–7	(Northern Ireland) Daryl Gurney; 94.02
Rob Cross (England); 100.31	10–5	(England) James Wade; 91.91
Final (best of 21 legs)
Michael van Gerwen (Netherlands); 103.36	11–5	(England) Rob Cross; 100.98
Night's Total Average: 97.76
Highest Checkout: (Netherlands) Michael van Gerwen 130
Most 180s: (Netherlands) Michael van Gerwen 8
Night's 180s: 21

== Table and streaks ==
=== Table ===
After the withdrawal of Gary Anderson, nine invited players were added to replace him with one playing each week. After the first nine rounds in phase 1, the bottom player in the table is eliminated. In phase 2, the eight remaining players play in a single match on each of the seven nights. The top four players then compete in the knockout semi-finals and final on the playoff night.

The nine invited players are not ranked in the table, but the main nine players can earn league points for a win or draw in the games against them.

Two points are awarded for a win and one point for a draw. When players are tied on points, leg difference is used first as a tie-breaker, after that legs won against throw and then tournament average.

#	Name	Matches					Legs				Scoring					
#	Name	Pld	W	D	L	Pts	LF	LA	+/-	LWAT	100+	140+	180s	A	HC	C%
1	(Netherlands) Michael van Gerwen W	16	10	3	3	23	107	67	+40	40	208	123	41	101.94	132	49.08%
2	(England) Rob Cross RU	16	10	2	4	22	102	76	+26	39	190	117	54	99.69	164	44.16%
3	(England) James Wade	16	7	6	3	20	104	84	+20	38	274	150	44	97.87	161	43.70%
4	(Northern Ireland) Daryl Gurney	16	8	3	5	19	93	86	+7	33	226	130	45	96.72	140	40.26%
5	(Wales) Gerwyn Price	16	6	6	4	18	99	93	+6	33	223	94	54	96.16	170	42.67%
6	(Austria) Mensur Suljović	16	7	3	6	17	94	95	–1	36	248	154	42	95.79	144	39.66%
7	(England) Michael Smith	16	3	4	9	10	79	105	–26	24	215	133	55	97.08	170	35.59%
8	(Scotland) Peter Wright	16	2	5	9	9	76	108	–32	22	215	138	43	95.52	160	41.76%
9	(Netherlands) Raymond van Barneveld	9	1	2	6	4	42	57	–15	12	115	65	25	90.35	170	36.46%

(Q) = Qualified For The Playoffs (E) = Eliminated From Playoff Contention

=== Streaks ===
Player	Phase 1, Weeks 1 to 8									Phase 2, Weeks 9 to 15							Play-offs	
Player	1	2	3	4	5	6	7	8A	8B	9	10	11	12	13	14	15	SF	F
(Netherlands) Michael van Gerwen	W	W	W	L	D	W	L	W	W	D	W	W	D	L	W	W	W	W
(England) Rob Cross	D	W	L	W	W	W	W	L	W	W	W	L	D	W	W	L	W	L
(England) James Wade	W	L	D	W	W	L	D	D	W	L	D	W	D	W	D	W	L	–
(Northern Ireland) Daryl Gurney	L	W	W	L	L	D	W	W	W	L	D	L	W	W	D	W	L	–
(Wales) Gerwyn Price	W	D	D	D	W	L	L	L	W	D	W	W	D	L	D	W	–	
(Austria) Mensur Suljović	D	L	D	W	L	W	W	W	L	W	L	W	D	W	L	L	–	
(England) Michael Smith	L	D	L	W	L	W	L	W	L	D	L	L	D	L	D	L	–	
(Scotland) Peter Wright	D	D	W	L	W	D	D	L	L	D	L	L	L	L	L	L	–	
(Netherlands) Raymond van Barneveld	L	D	D	L	L	L	W	L	L	Eliminated								
Contenders	D	L	L	D	D	L	L	D	L	—N/a								

Legend:	W	Win	D	Draw	L	Loss	—N/a	Eliminated

=== Positions by Week ===
Player	Phase 1, Weeks 1 to 8									Phase 2, Weeks 9 to 15						
Player	1	2	3	4	5	6	7	8A	8B	9	10	11	12	13	14	15
(Netherlands) Michael van Gerwen	3	1	1	1	3	1	2	1	1	2	2	1	1	2	2	1
(England) Rob Cross	5	3	6	3	2	2	1	2	2	1	1	2	2	1	1	2
(England) James Wade	2	6	5	2	1	3	3	4	3	4	3	3	3	3	3	3
(Northern Ireland) Daryl Gurney	8	4	2	7	7	8	7	9	4	5	6	6	6	5	5	4
(Wales) Gerwyn Price	1	2	3	4	4	5	6	7	6	6	4	4	4	6	6	5
(Austria) Mensur Suljović	4	9	8	5	6	6	4	3	5	3	5	5	5	4	4	6
(England) Michael Smith	7	7	9	8	8	7	9	8	8	8	8	8	7	8	7	7
(Scotland) Peter Wright	6	5	4	6	5	4	5	6	7	7	7	7	8	7	8	8
(Netherlands) Raymond van Barneveld	9	8	7	9	9	9	8	7	9	Eliminated						
