= Northern Ireland Open (darts) =

Tournament information
- Venue: Bellini's
- Location: Newry
- Country: Northern Ireland
- Established: 2003
- Organisation(s): WDF
- Format: Legs

Current champion(s)
- Darren Johnson (men's); Lisa Ashton (women's); Alfie Baird (boys); Sophie McKinlay (girls)

The Northern Ireland Open is a darts tournament that has been held since 2003.

== List of tournaments ==
=== Men's ===
Year	Champion	Score	Runner-up	Total Prize Money	Champion	Runner-up
2003	Gary Anderson	beat	(England) Darryl Fitton	£3,400	£1,200	£600
2004	Raymond van Barneveld	beat	Paul Hogan	£3,400	£1,200	£600
2005	Michael van Gerwen	2 – 0	(England) Tony Eccles	£3,400	£1,200	£600
2006	(Wales) Mark Webster	beat	(England) Darryl Fitton	£3,400	£1,200	£600
2007	Gary Anderson (2)	2 – 1	(England) Darryl Fitton	£3,500	£1,500	£700
2008	Stephen Bunting	2 – 0	(England) Darryl Fitton	£3,650	£1,600	£750
2009	(England) Martin Atkins	2 – 0	(Netherlands) Willy van de Wiel	£3,650	£1,600	£750
2010	(England) Robbie Green	2 – 0	(Scotland) Ewan Hyslop	£3,650	£1,600	£750
2011	(England) Tony O'Shea	2 – 1	(Republic of Ireland) Martin McCloskey	£3,600	£1,600	£700
2012	Daryl Gurney	2 – 0	(Netherlands) Willy van de Wiel	£3,600	£1,600	£700
2013	Glen Durrant	6 – 5	(Republic of Ireland) Glenn Spearing	£3,600	£1,600	£700
2014	Glen Durrant (2)	6 – 2	(Wales) Martin Phillips	£3,600	£1,600	£700
2015	(Northern Ireland) Colin McGarry	6 – 2	(Republic of Ireland) Mick McGowan	£3,650	£1,600	£750
2016	(Republic of Ireland) Keith Rooney	7 – 3	(Northern Ireland) Kyle McKinstry	£3,650	£1,600	£750
2017	(Northern Ireland) Kyle McKinstry	6 – 4	(England) Dave Parletti	£5,000	£1,800	£800
2018	Jim Williams	6 – 0	(Republic of Ireland) Francis Carragher	£5,000	£2,000	£800
2019	Kyle McKinstry 92.47 (2)	6 – 5	Jason Heaver 86.22	£5,000	£2,000	£800
2022	Darren Johnson	5 – 4	Nick Kenny	£5,600	£1,600	£800

=== Women's ===
Year	Champion	Score	Runner-up	Total Prize Money	Champion	Runner-up
2003	(Sweden) Carina Ekberg	beat	(England) Crissy Manley			
2004	(Wales) Jan Robbins	beat	(England) Dee Bateman			
2005	(England) Trina Gulliver	beat	(Netherlands) Francis Hoenselaar			
2006	(Wales) Julie Gore	beat	(Netherlands) Francis Hoenselaar			
2007	(Northern Ireland) Denise Cassidy	beat	(England) Trina Gulliver			
2008	(Netherlands) Francis Hoenselaar	5 – 2	(Northern Ireland) Trina Gulliver			
2009	(England) Karen Lawman	beat	(Northern Ireland) Denise Cassidy			
2010	(Northern Ireland) Denise Cassidy	5 – 4	(Northern Ireland) Dawn Campbell			
2011	(Wales) Sarah Thornbury	5 – 4	(Russia) Anastasia Dobromyslova			
2012	(England) Deta Hedman	bt.	(England) Fallon Sherrock			
2013	(England) Deta Hedman	bt.	(England) Rachel Brooks			
2014	(England) Paula Jacklin	5–1	(Northern Ireland) Kayleigh O'Neill			
2015	(England) Deta Hedman	5–2	(England) Trina Gulliver			
2016	(England) Deta Hedman	5–3	(Russia) Anastasia Dobromyslova			
2017	(Russia) Anastasia Dobromyslova	5–0	(England) Paula Jacklin			
2018	(England) Lorraine Winstanley	5–2	(Russia) Anastasia Dobromyslova	£1,325	£650	£275
2019	Kirsty Hutchinson 72.26	5–0	Kaisu Rekinen 54.09	£1,325	£650	£275
2022	(England) Lisa Ashton	5–1	(Scotland) Lorraine Hyde	£2,400	£800	£400

=== Boys ===
Year	Champion	Av.	Score	Runner-Up	Av.	Prize Money			Venue
Year	Champion	Av.	Score	Runner-Up	Av.	Total	Ch.	R.-Up	Venue
2012	(Northern Ireland) Jason McConnell	n/a	beat	(Republic of Ireland) Mark Connolly	n/a	—	—	—	Bellini's, Newry
2014	Nathan Rafferty	n/a	beat	(Republic of Ireland) Mark Connolly	n/a	—	—	—	Bellini's, Newry
2015	Nathan Rafferty (2)	n/a	beat	Keane Barry	n/a	—	—	—	Bellini's, Newry
2016	Keane Barry	n/a	beat	(Northern Ireland) Gareth Kilgallon	n/a	—	—	—	Bellini's, Newry
2022	Alfie Baird	n/a	5 – 4	Travis Baur	n/a	—	—	—	Bellini's, Newry

=== Girls ===
Year	Champion	Av.	Score	Runner-Up	Av.	Prize Money			Venue
Year	Champion	Av.	Score	Runner-Up	Av.	Total	Ch.	R.-Up	Venue
2012	(Northern Ireland) Kayleigh O'Neill	n/a	beat	(Republic of Ireland) Emma Smith	n/a	—	—	—	Bellini's, Newry
2015	(Republic of Ireland) Jamie O'Connor	n/a	beat	(Northern Ireland) Hanna Balmer	n/a	—	—	—	Bellini's, Newry
2022	Sophie McKinlay	n/a	4 – 0	Chelsea Hamill	n/a	—	—	—	Bellini's, Newry

== Tournament records ==
- Most wins 3: (Northern Ireland) Fred McMullan.
- Most Finals 4: (England) Darryl Fitton.
- Most Semi Finals 4: (England) Darryl Fitton, (England) Gary Robson.
- Most Quarter Finals 4: (England) Darryl Fitton, Gary Anderson, (England) Gary Robson.
- Most Appearances 6: (England) Martin Atkins.
- Most Prize Money won £3,200: (England) Glen Durrant.
- Best winning average (.) : v's.
- Youngest Winner age 16: (Netherlands) Michael van Gerwen.
- Oldest Winner age 50: (England) Tony O'Shea.

== See also ==
- List of BDO ranked tournaments
- List of WDF tournaments
