= Justin Thompson (darts player) =

Australian darts player (born 1969)

Personal information
- Nickname: "Thommo"
- Born: 8 January 1969 (age 57) Bendigo, Victoria, Australia
- Home town: Beverford, Victoria, Australia

Sport
- Sport: Darts
- Playing since: 1990
- Darts: 23 Gram
- Laterality: Right-handed
- Walk-on music: "Shotgun" by George Ezra

Organisation (see split in darts)
- BDO: 2003–2020
- WDF: 2003–
- Current world ranking: (WDF) NR (17 August 2026)

WDF major events – best performances
- World Championship: Last 32: 2018, 2019, 2020, 2022
- World Masters: Last 80: 2017
- World Trophy: Last 32: 2018, 2019

Other tournament wins
- Years
DPA Australian Pro Tour Hobart	2017
DPA Pro Tour	2017
DPA World Series Qualifier	2017
Geelong Classic	2017
Murray Bridge Grand Prix	2018
Newcastle Classic	2018
Sunshine State Classic	2018
Van Diemen Classic	2017
Geelong dart club Classic	2016,2017,2019
Darts Victoria Easter Classic	2021
North Queensland Classic	2019
Victoria Representative	1999, 2000,2001,2002,2003,2004,2016,2017,2018 2019,2020,2022,2024
Australia Representative	2004,2016,2017,2018,2019,2020,2022
WDF World Cup Team	2017
Medal record
Men's Darts
Representing Australia
WDF Asia-Pacific Cup
Gold medal – first place	2016 Osaka	Men's singles
Gold medal – first place	2016 Osaka	Men's pairs
Gold medal – first place	2016 Osaka	Team event
Gold medal – first place	2018 Seoul	Men's pairs
Bronze medal – third place	2018 Seoul	Team event

Justin Thompson (born 8 January 1969) is an Australian professional darts player who plays in World Darts Federation (WDF) events.

== Career ==
A veteran of the DPA circuit, he won the WDF Asia-Pacific Cup Singles in 2016, plus the Geelong Classic. Winner DA Australian Men's Singles 2017 as well as two DPA Australian Pro Tour events in 2017.

Thompson competed in the 2018 BDO World Darts Championship, making his first appearance in the event against Chris Gilliland in the preliminary round, a match which he overcame Gilliland 3–2.

== World Championship results ==
=== BDO/WDF ===
- 2018: First round (lost to Darryl Fitton 2–3) (sets)
- 2019: First round (lost to Michael Unterbuchner 2–3)
- 2020: First round (lost to Wayne Warren 2–3)
- 2022: Second round (lost to Neil Duff 0–3)
