= Darts World Rankings =

The Darts World Rankings are systems designed to determine a list of the best darts players in the world based on their performances in past tournaments.

In 1993, a group of former world champions and other high-profile players separated from the British Darts Organisation, meaning there were several major governing bodies in the sport. Each organization has its own players, and each has its own ranking system.

After the British Darts Organisation folded in 2020, the two main rankings are now maintained by the World Darts Federation and the Professional Darts Corporation.

The ranking systems are used to arrange tournament seedings, which are so arranged, that the number one player in the world will not face the number two player until the final of a tournament, providing they both reach that final.

== PDC World Rankings ==
The Professional Darts Corporation's Ranking is based on the amount of prize money won in ranking tournaments on a two year cycle.

PDC World Rankings as of 29 July 2026.
Players ranked 1–32
Rank	Change	Player	Earnings
1	Steady	Luke Littler	£3,128,500
2	Steady	Luke Humphries	£1,005,500
3	Steady	Gian van Veen	£1,005,250
4	Steady	Gerwyn Price	£725,000
5	Steady	Jonny Clayton	£683,000
6	Steady	James Wade	£656,250
7	Steady	Michael van Gerwen	£645,000
8	Steady	Josh Rock	£639,500
9	Steady	Stephen Bunting	£618,250
10	Steady	Danny Noppert	£601,750
11	Steady	Gary Anderson	£598,250
12	Steady	Ryan Searle	£596,250
13	Steady	Wessel Nijman	£570,250
14	Steady	Chris Dobey	£569,500
15	Steady	Ross Smith	£534,250
16	Steady	Nathan Aspinall	£531,750
17	Steady	Jermaine Wattimena	£510,750
18	Steady	Luke Woodhouse	£492,000
19	Steady	Martin Schindler	£448,750
20	▲1	Damon Heta	£439,250
21	▼1	Krzysztof Ratajski	£430,000
22	▲1	Dirk van Duijvenbode	£425,750
23	▼1	Mike De Decker	£424,500
24	Steady	Rob Cross	£423,000
25	Steady	Ryan Joyce	£396,250
26	Steady	Cameron Menzies	£383,250
27	Steady	Andrew Gilding	£365,250
28	Steady	Dave Chisnall	£362,250
29	Steady	Daryl Gurney	£353,500
30	Steady	Kevin Doets	£347,750
31	Steady	Joe Cullen	£314,500
32	Steady	Ritchie Edhouse	£301,250
*Change since 26 July 2026.

PDC World Rankings as of 29 July 2026.
Players ranked 33–64
Rank	Change	Player	Earnings
33	Steady	Peter Wright	£282,000
34	Steady	Ricardo Pietreczko	£279,750
35	Steady	Michael Smith	£253,750
36	Steady	Niels Zonneveld	£253,250
37	Steady	William O'Connor	£251,000
38	▲1	Niko Springer	£217,000
39	▼1	Martin Lukeman	£214,250
40	▲1	Raymond van Barneveld	£200,500
41	▼1	Callan Rydz	£199,000
42	▲1	Mickey Mansell	£192,750
43	▼1	Madars Razma	£192,250
44	▲3	Justin Hood	£189,000
45	▼1	Gabriel Clemens	£187,750
46	▼1	Connor Scutt	£184,250
47	▼1	Dimitri Van den Bergh	£182,500
48	▲3	Jeffrey de Graaf	£174,750
49	Steady	Ricky Evans	£174,000
50	Steady	James Hurrell	£173,250
51	▼3	Scott Williams	£171,250
52	Steady	Kim Huybrechts	£164,000
53	Steady	Mensur Suljović	£161,250
54	Steady	Brendan Dolan	£160,250
55	Steady	Ian White	£154,750
56	▲4	Sebastian Białecki	£145,000
56	Steady	Keane Barry	£145,000
58	▲1	Karel Sedláček	£144,500
58	Steady	Richard Veenstra	£144,500
60	▼3	Alan Soutar	£137,250
61	Steady	Robert Owen	£128,750
62	Steady	Ryan Meikle	£124,750
63	▲1	Nick Kenny	£123,750
64	▼1	Lukas Wenig	£123,500
*Change since 26 July 2026.

Click "show" to view players ranked outside top 64

PDC World Rankings as of 29 July 2026.
Players ranked 65th or lower
Rank	Change	Player	Earnings
65	Steady	Thibault Tricole	£118,250
66	▲1	Mario Vandenbogaerde	£113,000
67	▼1	Max Hopp	£111,000
68	Steady	Bradley Brooks	£109,750
69	Steady	Cam Crabtree	£100,000
70	Steady	Wesley Plaisier	£92,750
71	Steady	Adam Lipscombe	£78,750
72	Steady	Maik Kuivenhoven	£76,750
73	Steady	Cristo Reyes	£76,000
74	Steady	Tom Bissell	£67,500
75	▲2	Darryl Pilgrim	£66,250
76	▼1	Cor Dekker	£65,750
77	▲1	Beau Greaves	£62,500
78	▼2	Dominik Grüllich	£62,250
79	Steady	Christian Kist	£60,500
80	Steady	Andy Boulton	£53,000
81	Steady	Jim Long	£50,500
82	Steady	Tom Sykes	£49,000
83	Steady	Charlie Manby	£42,000
84	▲5	Joe Hunt	£40,750
84	▲2	Oskar Lukasiak	£40,750
86	▼3	Leon Weber	£40,000
87	▼2	Thomas Lovely	£38,500
88	Steady	Jimmy van Schie	£38,250
89	▼2	Tavis Dudeney	£37,250
90	Steady	Marvin van Velzen	£36,500
91	Steady	Darius Labanauskas	£36,250
92	Steady	Viktor Tingström	£34,500
93	Steady	Shane McGuirk	£33,500
94	Steady	Alexander Merkx	£32,250
95	▲30	Henry Coates	£30,750
96	▼1	Kai Gotthardt	£29,750
97	▲1	Mervyn King	£29,000
98	▲4	David Sharp	£28,750
99	▼1	Adam Paxton	£28,250
100	▼4	Adam Warner	£27,500
100	▼4	Dennie Olde Kalter	£27,500
102	▼2	Greg Ritchie	£26,750
103	▼2	Adam Gawlas	£25,750
104	▲4	Jurjen van der Velde	£24,750
105	Steady	Jeffrey de Zwaan	£24,250
106	▼3	Jeffrey Sparidaans	£23,750
107	▲3	Benjamin Pratnemer	£23,250
107	▼3	Owen Bates	£23,250
109	▼4	Tommy Morris	£23,000
110	▲4	Tyler Thorpe	£22,750
110	▼1	Niall Culleton	£22,750
112	▼5	Scott Waites	£22,500
113	▼2	Chris Landman	£20,750
114	▲1	Jack Tweddell	£20,500
114	▼2	Stephen Burton	£20,500
116	▼3	Martijn Dragt	£20,250
117	▲5	Sietse Lap	£19,250
118	Steady	Maximilian Czerwinski	£18,750
119	▲2	Rhys Griffin	£18,000
120	▼4	Arno Merk	£17,750
120	▼4	Derek Coulson	£17,750
122	▼4	Tommy Lishman	£17,500
123	▼3	Adam Leek	£17,250
124	Steady	Stephen Rosney	£15,750
125	▼2	Tytus Kanik	£15,000
126	▲3	Stefaan Henderyck	£14,250
127	▲3	Steve Lennon	£13,750
128	▼2	Nathan Potter	£13,000
128	▼2	Harry Ward	£13,000
130	▼2	Stefan Bellmont	£12,750
131	▼1	Yorick Hofkens	£12,500
132	Steady	Pascal Rupprecht	£12,250
133	▲1	Samuel Price	£10,750
134	▲2	Carl Sneyd	£10,500
135	▼2	Rusty-Jake Rodriguez	£10,000
136	▲5	Daniel Ayres	£9,750
137	▲1	Marvin Kraft	£9,500
137	▼3	Paul Krohne	£9,500
139	▼3	Boris Krčmar	£8,500
140	▼2	Daniel Klose	£8,250
141	▼1	Andy Baetens	£8,000
142	Steady	Michael Unterbuchner	£7,500
143	Steady	Jan Schmidt	£7,000
143	Steady	Patrik Kovács	£7,000
145	▲3	Lewis Pride	£6,500
145	Steady	Pero Ljubić	£6,500
147	▼1	Dragutin Horvat	£5,500
147	▼1	Marcel Hausotter	£5,500
149	▲4	Christopher Wickenden	£5,000
150	▲9	Oliver Mitchell	£4,250
151	▼2	Johan Engström	£4,000
151	▼2	Finn Behrens	£4,000
151	▼2	Callum Goffin	£4,000
151	▼2	Anton Östlund	£4,000
155	▼2	Aden Kirk	£3,750
155	▼2	Filip Bereza	£3,750
155	▼2	Scott Campbell	£3,750
158	▼1	Valters Melderis	£3,500
159	▼1	Jack Aldridge	£3,250
160	▼1	Patrik Williams	£3,000
161	▲34	Ted Evetts	£2,500
161	Steady	Graham Hall	£2,500
163	▼1	Jaimy van de Weerd	£2,000
163	▼1	Michal Šmejda	£2,000
163	▼1	Mio Varila	£2,000
163	▼1	Adrian Dudek	£2,000
163	▼1	Gabriel Varaljay	£2,000
163	▼1	Jan Sliacky	£2,000
163	▼1	Juraj Holub	£2,000
163	▼1	Péter Kelemen	£2,000
163	▼1	Jason Riedtke	£2,000
163	▼1	Nándor Major	£2,000
163	▼1	Teemu Harju	£2,000
163	▼1	György Jehirszki	£2,000
163	▼1	Liam Maendl-Lawrance	£2,000
163	▼1	Aaron Hardy	£2,000
163	▼1	Nick Zwittnigg	£2,000
163	▼1	Zoran Lerchbacher	£2,000
163	▼1	Michael Hurtz	£2,000
163	▼1	Petr Křivka	£2,000
163	▼1	Robin Masino	£2,000
163	▼1	Kevin Troppmann	£2,000
163	▼1	François Schweyen	£2,000
163	▼1	Jani Haavisto	£2,000
163	▼1	Pascal Devroey	£2,000
163	▼1	Florian Hempel	£2,000
163	▼1	Florian Preis	£2,000
163	▼1	Jonas Masalin	£2,000
163	▼1	Wojciech Bruliński	£2,000
163	▼1	Sam Spivey	£2,000
163	▼1	Andreas Harrysson	£2,000
163	▼1	Dawid Robak	£2,000
163	▼1	Krzysztof Kciuk	£2,000
163	▼1	Mirosław Grudziecki	£2,000
163	▼1	Piotr Maciejczak	£2,000
196	New entry	Gilbert van der Meijden	£1,250
196	▼1	Danny Trueman	£1,250
196	▼1	Matthias Ehlers	£1,250
196	▼1	Jack Todd	£1,250
196	▼1	Jamai van den Herik	£1,250
196	▼1	Oliver King	£1,250
196	▼1	Ron Meulenkamp	£1,250
196	▼1	Samuel Whittaker	£1,250
204	▼1	Danny van Trijp	£750
204	▼1	Jesús Sálate	£750
*Change since 26 July 2026.

== WDF World rankings ==
The rankings are based on a cumulative points system, calculated on a rolling one-year basis. When a tournament is played, the previous year's results are removed from the rankings and the new tournament scores are used. This list is used to determine seeds for some of the WDF Opens. The World Darts Federation ranking system is designed to provide a measure of the global activities of darts players in every WDF recognized darts event. It used to be very similar to the BDO system but was revised in January 2007 to include categories by country and by events, and the distribution of ranking points reflect the levels of prize money on offer and the numbers of entries in a tournament. Players gain points in six levels of categorized events and prize money and at the end of the season the leading players receive monetary bonus rewards from the WDF.

=== Current points distribution ===
Points are currently awarded as follows:

=== Current rankings ===
WDF Open World Rankings as of 22 June 2026.
Rank	Change	Player	Points
1	Steady	Mitchell Lawrie	919
2	▲1	Jenson Walker	708
3	▲1	Paul Krohne	700
4	▲5	Neil Duff	626
5	▲6	Jeff Smith	567
6	▼1	Jason Brandon	541
7	▼1	Corné Groeneveld	503
8	▼6	Leonard Gates	481
9	▼1	Alex Spellman	449
10	▲2	Raymond Smith	442
11	▼4	James Beeton	416
12	▼2	Ben Robb	415
13	▲18	Moreno Blom	391
14	▲7	Alex Williams	375
15	▲18	Daniel Zapata	360
16	▼1	Stefan Schröder	357
17	▲76	Jarno Bottenberg	352
18	▼5	Matt Clark	344
19	▼3	Caleb Hope	343
20	▼2	Ross Montgomery	335
21	▼1	Cliff Prior	327
22	▼8	Liam Maendl-Lawrance	321
23	▲22	Dustin Holt	311
24	▼2	Thomas Junghans	308
25	▲19	Darren Johnson	303
26	▼9	François Schweyen	301
27	▲2	Kevin Luke	297
28	▲4	András Borbély	291
29	▲44	Franko Giuliani	279
30	▲13	Ethan De Veyra	276
31	▼5	Vince Tipple	266
32	▲80	Mursel Yavuz	260

WDF Women's World Rankings as of 16 March 2026.
Rank	Change	Player	Points
1	Steady	Deta Hedman	1272
2	Steady	Lerena Rietbergen	967
3	Steady	Priscilla Steenbergen	856
4	▲1	Nicole Regnaud	776
5	▼1	Lorraine Hyde	771
6	▲2	Rhian O'Sullivan	728
7	▼1	Sophie McKinlay	719
8	▼1	Kirsi Viinikainen	695
9	▲1	Irina Armstrong	654
10	▼1	Tracy Feiertag	647
11	Steady	Jitka Císařová	645
12	Steady	Aileen de Graaf	640
13	Steady	Paula Murphy	564
14	Steady	Paige Pauling	529
15	▲1	Joanne Hadley	480
16	▲1	Emine Dursun	474
17	▲1	Cali West	470
18	▼3	Eve Watson	462
19	Steady	Maria Carli	450
20	Steady	Paula Jacklin	443
21	▲20	Gemma Hayter	434
22	▼1	Aaja Jalbert	433
23	▼1	Aletta Wajer	423
24	▼1	Maud Jansson	400
25	▼1	Rachna David	390
26	▼1	Veronika Ihász	377
27	▼1	Mikuru Suzuki	360
28	▼1	Gréta Tekauer	359
29	▼1	Anca Zijlstra	350
30	▲1	Desi Mercer	315
31	▼2	Mayumi Ouchi	309
32	▼2	Taylor-Marsh Kahaki	298

== Previous World Number Ones (Men's, WDF) ==
The following is a list of players who ended the year ranked number one in the WDF.

- 1976 (Wales) Alan Evans
- 1977 (England) John Lowe
- 1978 (Wales) Leighton Rees
- 1979 (England) John Lowe (2)
- 1980 (England) Eric Bristow
- 1981 (England) Eric Bristow (2)
- 1982 (Scotland) Jocky Wilson
- 1983 (England) Eric Bristow (3)
- 1984 (England) Eric Bristow (4)
- 1985 (England) Eric Bristow (5)
- 1986 (England) John Lowe (3)
- 1987 (England) Bob Anderson
- 1988 (England) John Lowe (4)
- 1989 (England) Bob Anderson (2)
- 1990 (England) Eric Bristow (6)
- 1991 (England) Phil Taylor
- 1992 (England) Rod Harrington
- 1993 (Belgium) Leo Laurens
- 1994 (England) Steve Beaton
- 1995 (Wales) Richie Burnett
- 1996 (England) Martin Adams
- 1997 (England) Martin Adams (2)
- 1998 (England) Ronnie Baxter
- 1999 (Netherlands) Raymond van Barneveld
- 2000 (Netherlands) Raymond van Barneveld (2)
- 2001 (England) Mervyn King
- 2002 (England) John Walton
- 2003 (England) Martin Adams (3)
- 2004 (Netherlands) Raymond van Barneveld (3)
- 2005 (Netherlands) Raymond van Barneveld (4)
- 2006 (England) Martin Adams (4)
- 2007 (Scotland) Gary Anderson
- 2008 (England) Scott Waites
- 2009 (England) Tony O'Shea
- 2010 (England) Martin Adams (5)
- 2011 (England) Scott Waites (2)
- 2012 (England) Stephen Bunting
- 2013 (England) James Wilson
- 2014 (England) Alan Norris
- 2015 (Lithuania) Darius Labanauskas
- 2016 (Lithuania) Darius Labanauskas (2)
- 2017 (England) Scott Mitchell
- 2018 Jim Williams
- 2019 Nick Kenny
- 2020 Wayne Warren
- 2021 Brian Raman
- 2022 Jelle Klaasen
- 2023 Andy Baetens
- 2024 Jimmy van Schie
- 2025 Jimmy van Schie (2)

== BDO rankings ==
The BDO Invitational Table relates only to registered playing members of the BDO, who comply with BDO and World Darts Federation (WDF) eligibility rules, including terms and conditions of the 1997 Tomlin Order.

The BDO awards points depending on a player's performances within each of its events and other BDO-recognised qualifying events. Forty-nine points are awarded to the champion of each of its three Major Events – The Lakeside World Professional Championship, The Bavaria World Darts Trophy and the Winmau World Masters and A+ events. Lower points are awarded for each round of the tournament reached. Other events are placed into Category A, B, C, and D based on the prize pool and number of payouts, with points for placings slowly decreasing. Only the best 12 placings are added for a player's ranking.

=== Final rankings ===
Following a cease in tournaments due to the COVID-19 pandemic, the BDO stopped publishing rankings on 18 March 2020. The BDO having entered liquidation in September of that year, what follows are the final published rankings by the organisation.

Final BDO Men's World Rankings as of 18 March 2020.
Rank	Player	Points
1	Jim Williams	381
2	Wesley Harms	357
3	Wayne Warren	329
4	Nick Kenny	307
5	Michael Warburton	306
6	Richard Veenstra	261
7	Dave Parletti	259
8	Martijn Kleermaker	253
9	David Evans	250
10	Mario Vandenbogaerde	247

BDO Women's World Rankings as of 18 March 2020.
Rank	Player	Points
1	Lisa Ashton	431
2	Beau Greaves	415
3	Fallon Sherrock	406
4	Anastasia Dobromyslova	359
5	Lorraine Winstanley	348
6	Aileen de Graaf	336
7	Mikuru Suzuki	329
8	Deta Hedman	321
9	Laura Turner	307
10	Maria O'Brien	274
