= England Open =

Tournament information
- Venue: Camber Sands (1995–2000); Brean Sands (2001–2007, 2022); Bunn Leisure (2008–2021); Ilfracombe Holiday Park (2024)
- Location: Camber (1995–2000); Burnham-on-Sea (2001–2007, 2022); Selsey (2008–2021); Ilfracombe (2024)
- Country: England
- Established: 1995
- Organisation(s): WDF
- Format: Legs
- Prize fund: £7,060

Current champion(s)
- Neil Duff (men's); Beau Greaves (women's)

The England Open is a darts tournament that has been held annually since 1995.

== List of tournaments ==
=== Men's ===
Year	Champion	Av.	Score	Runner-Up	Av.	Prize Money			Venue
Year	Champion	Av.	Score	Runner-Up	Av.	Total	Ch.	R.-Up	Venue
1995	Kevin Painter	n/a	2 – 0	Ronnie Baxter	n/a	n/a	n/a	n/a	Camber Sands, Camber
1996	Geoff Wylie	n/a	2 – 1	Raymond van Barneveld	n/a	n/a	n/a	n/a	Camber Sands, Camber
1997	Andy Smith	n/a	2 – 1	Roland Scholten	n/a	n/a	n/a	n/a	Camber Sands, Camber
1998	Alan Warriner-Little	n/a	2 – 1	Ritchie Davies	n/a	n/a	n/a	n/a	Camber Sands, Camber
1999	Peter Manley	n/a	2 – 1	Colin Monk	n/a	n/a	n/a	n/a	Camber Sands, Camber
2000	Andy Jenkins	n/a	2 – 1	Mick Nixon	n/a	n/a	n/a	n/a	Camber Sands, Camber
2001	Chris Mason	92.49	2 – 0	Mike Veitch	78.15	n/a	n/a	n/a	Brean Sands, Burnham-on-Sea
2002	Brian Derbyshire	n/a	2 – 0	Dave Routledge	n/a	n/a	n/a	n/a	Brean Sands, Burnham-on-Sea
2003	Ted Hankey	n/a	2 – 0	Gary Anderson	n/a	n/a	n/a	n/a	Brean Sands, Burnham-on-Sea
2004	Dave Routledge	n/a	2 – 1	Ted Hankey	n/a	£2,940	£1,500	£500	Brean Sands, Burnham-on-Sea
2005	Tony Eccles	n/a	2 – 1	Remco van Eijden	n/a	£2,940	£1,500	£500	Brean Sands, Burnham-on-Sea
2006	Mike Veitch	87.33	3 – 2	Paul Gibbs	80.22	£2,940	£1,500	£500	Brean Sands, Burnham-on-Sea
2007	Ted Hankey (2)	83.88	3 – 0	Gary Anderson	79.23	£2,940	£1,500	£500	Brean Sands, Burnham-on-Sea
2008	Ross Montgomery	n/a	3 – 2	Gary Anderson	n/a	£6,200	£2,000	£1,000	Bunn Leisure, Selsey
2009	Ted Hankey (3)	96.36	5 – 0	Tony O'Shea	87.66	£6,200	£2,000	£1,000	Bunn Leisure, Selsey
2010	Dean Winstanley	n/a	5 – 2	Mark Harris	n/a	£7,800	£3,000	£1,000	Bunn Leisure, Selsey
2011	Gary Robson	83.64	6 – 2	Ted Hankey	75.96	£7,800	£3,000	£1,000	Bunn Leisure, Selsey
2012	Wesley Harms	n/a	6 – 1	Tony Broughton	n/a	£7,800	£3,000	£1,000	Bunn Leisure, Selsey
2013	Stephen Bunting	97.68	6 – 4	Geert De Vos	92.97	£13,800	£5,000	£2,000	Bunn Leisure, Selsey
2014	Wesley Harms (2)	97.56	7 – 2	Scott Mitchell	91.41	£13,800	£5,000	£2,000	Bunn Leisure, Selsey
2015	Wesley Harms (3)	100.74	7 – 5	Glen Durrant	90.33	£15,400	£5,000	£2,000	Bunn Leisure, Selsey
2016	Glen Durrant	n/a	6 – 3	Conan Whitehead	n/a	£15,400	£5,000	£2,000	Bunn Leisure, Selsey
2017	Geert De Vos	n/a	9 – 5	Mark McGeeney	n/a	£15,400	£5,000	£2,000	Bunn Leisure, Selsey
2018	Kyle McKinstry	n/a	6 – 0	Derk Telnekes	n/a	£15,400	£5,000	£2,000	Bunn Leisure, Selsey
2019	Jim Williams	n/a	6 – 1	Wayne Warren	n/a	£15,400	£5,000	£2,000	Bunn Leisure, Selsey
2021	Brian Raman	n/a	6 – 2	Ian Jones	n/a	£13,600	£4,000	£1,800	Bunn Leisure, Selsey
2022	David Pallett	n/a	5 – 4	Graham Hall	n/a	£7,040	£2,000	£1,000	Brean Sands, Burnham-on-Sea
2024	Neil Duff	n/a	6 – 3	Callum Francis	n/a	£4,940	£1,400	£700	Ilfracombe Holiday Park, Ilfracombe

=== Women's ===
Year	Champion	Av.	Score	Runner-Up	Av.	Prize Money			Venue
Year	Champion	Av.	Score	Runner-Up	Av.	Total	Ch.	R.-Up	Venue
1995	Pauline Dyer	n/a	beat	Mandy Solomons	n/a	n/a	n/a	n/a	Camber Sands, Camber
1996	Deta Hedman	n/a	3 – 2	Sue Edwards	n/a	n/a	n/a	n/a	Camber Sands, Camber
1997	Trina Gulliver	n/a	beat	Crissy Manley	n/a	n/a	n/a	n/a	Camber Sands, Camber
1998	Trina Gulliver (2)	n/a	beat	Francis Hoenselaar	n/a	n/a	n/a	n/a	Camber Sands, Camber
1999	Francis Hoenselaar	n/a	beat	Tricia Wright	n/a	n/a	n/a	n/a	Camber Sands, Camber
2000	Vicky Pruim	n/a	beat	Trina Gulliver	n/a	n/a	n/a	n/a	Camber Sands, Camber
2001	Trina Gulliver (3)	n/a	3 – 2	Francis Hoenselaar	n/a	n/a	n/a	n/a	Brean Sands, Burnham-on-Sea
2002	Trina Gulliver (4)	n/a	beat	Karin Krappen	n/a	n/a	n/a	n/a	Brean Sands, Burnham-on-Sea
2003	Trina Gulliver (5)	n/a	beat	Francis Hoenselaar	n/a	n/a	n/a	n/a	Brean Sands, Burnham-on-Sea
2004	Jan Robbins	n/a	3 – 0	Tricia Wright	n/a	n/a	n/a	n/a	Brean Sands, Burnham-on-Sea
2005	Francis Hoenselaar (2)	n/a	beat	Sue Gulliver	n/a	n/a	n/a	n/a	Brean Sands, Burnham-on-Sea
2006	Dee Bateman	n/a	beat	Karen Littler	n/a	n/a	n/a	n/a	Brean Sands, Burnham-on-Sea
2007	Anastasia Dobromyslova	n/a	beat	Louise Carroll	n/a	n/a	n/a	n/a	Brean Sands, Burnham-on-Sea
2008	Trina Gulliver (6)	n/a	beat	Irina Armstrong	n/a	n/a	n/a	n/a	Bunn Leisure, Selsey
2009	Irina Armstrong	71.28	3 – 1	Trina Gulliver	71.46	n/a	n/a	n/a	Bunn Leisure, Selsey
2010	Trina Gulliver (7)	n/a	4 – 0	Louise Hepburn	n/a	n/a	n/a	n/a	Bunn Leisure, Selsey
2011	Karen Lawman	70.23	4 – 2	Kirsi Viinikainen	65.25	n/a	n/a	n/a	Bunn Leisure, Selsey
2012	Anastasia Dobromyslova (2)	n/a	4 – 3	Deta Hedman	n/a	n/a	n/a	n/a	Bunn Leisure, Selsey
2013	Deta Hedman (2)	74.91	4 – 1	Lisa Ashton	73.71	n/a	n/a	n/a	Bunn Leisure, Selsey
2014	Anastasia Dobromyslova (3)	90.03	4 – 3	Aileen de Graaf	82.29	n/a	n/a	n/a	Bunn Leisure, Selsey
2015	Fallon Sherrock	86.04	6 – 3	Trina Gulliver	77.85	£6,000	£2,000	£1,000	Bunn Leisure, Selsey
2016	Deta Hedman (3)	n/a	5 – 2	Aileen de Graaf	n/a	£6,000	£2,000	£1,000	Bunn Leisure, Selsey
2017	Lorraine Winstanley	n/a	6 – 5	Aileen de Graaf	n/a	£6,000	£2,000	£1,000	Bunn Leisure, Selsey
2018	Lisa Ashton	n/a	5 – 3	Aileen de Graaf	n/a	£6,000	£2,000	£1,000	Bunn Leisure, Selsey
2019	Beau Greaves	n/a	5 – 4	Fallon Sherrock	n/a	£6,000	£2,000	£1,000	Bunn Leisure, Selsey
2021	Deta Hedman (4)	n/a	6 – 2	Anastasia Dobromyslova	n/a	£5,400	£1,800	£900	Bunn Leisure, Selsey
2022	Beau Greaves (2)	n/a	5 – 0	Cathy Hughes	n/a	£3,020	£1,000	£500	Brean Sands, Burnham-on-Sea
2024	Beau Greaves (3)	n/a	6 – 0	Rhian O'Sullivan	n/a	£2,120	£700	£350	Ilfracombe Holiday Park, Ilfracombe

== Tournament records ==
- Most wins 3: (England) Ted Hankey, (Netherlands) Wesley Harms.
- Most Finals 5: (England) Ted Hankey.
- Most Semi Finals 5: (England) Ted Hankey.
- Most Quarter Finals 8: (England) Ted Hankey.
- Most Appearances 10: (England) Ted Hankey.
- Youngest Winner age 24: (Belgium) Brian Raman.
- Oldest Winner age 51: (Northern Ireland) Neil Duff.
