= Chris Landman =

Dutch darts player (born 1981)

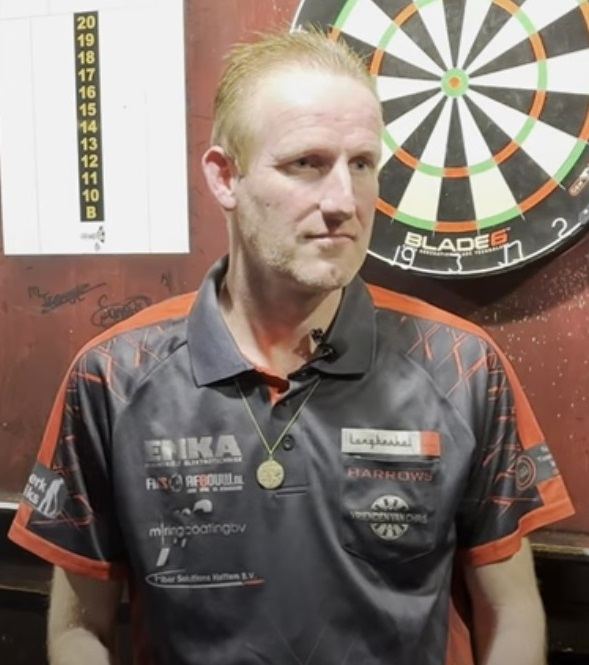
- Landman in 2023

Personal information
- Nickname: "The Countryman"
- Born: 17 January 1981 (age 45) Hattem, Netherlands
- Home town: Wapenveld, Netherlands

Sport
- Sport: Darts
- Playing since: 2011
- Darts: 21g Bull's NL
- Laterality: Right-handed
- Walk-on music: "Crazy on the Dancefloor" by DJ Norman

Organisation (see split in darts)
- BDO: 2016–2020
- PDC: 2022–present (Tour Card: 2024–present)
- WDF: 2016–2023
- Current world ranking: (PDC) 108 ▲1 (29 October 2026)

WDF major events – best performances
- World Championship: Runner-up: 2023
- World Masters: Last 16: 2017
- World Trophy: Last 32: 2018, 2019
- Finder Masters: Last 24 Group: 2018

PDC premier events – best performances
- World Championship: Last 64: 2022
- UK Open: Last 128: 2024
- PC Finals: Last 64: 2023, 2024

Other tournament wins
- Years
Catalonia Open	2017
Slovak Open	2020
Italian Open	2021
Northern Ireland Matchplay	2022
PDC Challenge Tour	2023
MODUS Super Series Weekly Winner	2024
Medal record
Men's Darts
Representing Netherlands
WDF Europe Cup
Silver medal – second place	2018 Budapest	Men's pairs
Silver medal – second place	2018 Budapest	Men's team
Silver medal – second place	2018 Budapest	Men's overall

Chris Landman (born 17 January 1981) is a Dutch professional darts player who competes in Professional Darts Corporation (PDC) events and previously competed in World Darts Federation (WDF) events. Landman reached the final at the WDF World Championship in 2023, finishing as runner-up to Andy Baetens. Also in 2023, Landman won a title on the PDC Challenge Tour and reached the final at Players Championship 9 on the 2023 PDC Pro Tour. Landman has won a PDC Tour Card at Qualifying School (Q–School) on two occasions: in 2024 and 2026.

== Career ==
=== 2017 ===
Landman won the 2017 Catalonian Open, reached the quarter-final of the 2017 WDF World Cup Singles, and reached the Last 16 of the 2017 BDO World Masters.

=== 2018 ===
Landman qualified for the 2018 BDO World Darts Championship as one of the Regional Table Qualifiers, losing to Derk Telnekes 3–0 in sets in the preliminary round.

=== 2019 ===
Landman also qualified for the 2019 BDO World Championship, losing in the first round to Kyle McKinstry 3–2.

=== 2020 ===
Landman qualified for the 2020 BDO World Championship and reached the quarter-finals after beating Dave Parletti 3–2 and Ben Hazel 4–3 before losing to eventual champion Wayne Warren 5–3.

=== 2021 ===
Landman qualified for the 2022 PDC World Darts Championship by winning the West Europe Qualifier. He whitewashed Sven Verdonck in the qualifier before defeating Niels Zonneveld 6–5 in a deciding leg, beating Mats Gies in the final 6–3. He played former BDO World Champion Scott Mitchell in the Last 96, beating him 3–0. This set up a clash with seeded player Ian White in the last 64, to whom Landman lost 3–1. Landman then went to Q-School, where he failed to gain a tour card. In 2022, Landman won the Northern Ireland Matchplay beating Shaun Griffiths 5–1.

Landman qualified for the 2023 WDF World Darts Championship as the 7th seed. He whitewashed Davie Kirwan 3–0, defeated Thomas Junghans 3–2, the number 2 seed and defending 2022 champion Neil Duff 4–3, and the number 3 seed and 2006 BDO World Champion Jelle Klaasen 5–3 in sets to reach the final where he was defeated by number 1 seed Andy Baetens 6–1.

Landman competed in the 2023 PDC Challenge Tour series and won event one, defeating Lukas Wenig 5–2 in the final. Landman received call–ups for 2023 PDC Players Championship series events filling in as a reserve for an absent tour card holder virtue of his ranking on the Challenge Tour Order of Merit. At Players Championship 7, Landman reached the final, losing to Krzysztof Ratajski 8–1.

In January 2024, Landman earned a Tour Card for the first time at the 2024 Q-School by finishing fourth on the European Q-School Order of Merit.

== Career finals ==
=== WDF major finals: 1 ===
Legend
World Championship (0–1)

Outcome	No.	Year	Championship	Opponent in the final	Score (Note: (l) = score in legs, (s) = score in sets.)
Runner-up	1.	2023	World Championship	(Belgium) Andy Baetens	1–6 (s)

== World Championship results ==
=== BDO World Championship ===
- 2018: Preliminary round (lost to Derk Telnekes 0–3) (sets)
- 2019: First round (lost to Kyle McKinstry 2–3)
- 2020: Quarter-finals (lost to Wayne Warren 3–5)

=== WDF World Championship ===
- 2023: Runner-up (lost to Andy Baetens 1–6)

=== PDC World Championship ===
- 2022: Second round (lost to Ian White 1–3)
- 2025: First round (lost to Lok Yin Lee 1–3)
- 2026: First round (lost to Ryan Searle 0–3)

== Performance timeline ==
=== BDO ===
Tournament	2016	2017	2018	2019	2020
BDO Ranked televised events
World Championship	DNQ		Prel.	1R	QF
World Masters	1R	6R	4R	DNQ	NH
World Trophy	DNP		1R	1R	NH
Finder Masters	DNQ		RR	NH	

=== WDF ===
Tournament	2022	2023
WDF Ranked televised events
World Championship	PDC	F
World Masters	5R	NH

=== PDC ===
Tournament	2022	2023	2024	2025	2026
PDC Ranked televised events
World Championship	2R	DNQ		1R	1R
World Masters	DNQ			Prel.	Prel.
UK Open	DNP		2R	2R	2R
Players Championship Finals	DNQ	1R	1R	DNQ	
Career statistics
Season-end ranking	–	103	84	69	

==== European Tour ====
Tournament	2024	2025	2026
Belgian Open	1R	DNQ	
Austrian Open	DNQ	2R	1R
Swiss Trophy	DNQ	2R	DNQ
International Open	DNQ		1R
Flanders Trophy	DNQ		2R

==== Players Championships ====
Season	1	2	3	4	5	6	7	8	9	10	11	12	13	14	15	16	17	18	19	20	21	22	23	24	25	26	27	28	29	30	31	32	33	34
2023 (Note: Not a Tour card holder)	BAR; 2R	BAR; 1R	BAR; 1R	BAR; 1R	BAR; QF	BAR; 4R	HIL; 1R	HIL; 1R	WIG; F	WIG; 1R	LEI; 2R	LEI; 1R	HIL; 1R	HIL; 1R	LEI; 2R	LEI; 2R	HIL; 1R	HIL; 1R	BAR; DNP			BAR; 2R	BAR; 1R	BAR; 1R	BAR; 1R	BAR; 4R	BAR; 1R	BAR; 3R	BAR; 1R	BAR; 3R				
2024	WIG; 1R	WIG; 1R	LEI; 2R	LEI; 2R	HIL; 3R	HIL; 3R	LEI; 4R	LEI; 1R	HIL; 2R	HIL; 1R	HIL; 1R	HIL; 2R	MIL; 1R	MIL; 1R	MIL; 2R	MIL; 1R	MIL; 4R	MIL; 4R	MIL; 2R	WIG; 3R	WIG; 1R	MIL; 2R	MIL; 1R	WIG; 1R	WIG; 3R	WIG; 1R	WIG; 2R	WIG; 1R	LEI; SF	LEI; 1R				
2025	WIG; 1R	WIG; 1R	ROS; DNP		LEI; 2R	LEI; 2R	HIL; 1R	HIL; 1R	LEI; 1R	LEI; 3R	LEI; 1R	LEI; 2R	ROS; 2R	ROS; 1R	HIL; 1R	HIL; 4R	LEI; 2R	LEI; 1R	LEI; 2R	LEI; 1R	LEI; 1R	HIL; 1R	HIL; 3R	MIL; 2R	MIL; 1R	HIL; 1R	HIL; 2R	LEI; 1R	LEI; 2R	LEI; 3R	WIG; QF	WIG; 1R	WIG; 4R	WIG; 1R
2026	HIL; 1R	HIL; 2R	WIG; 2R	WIG; 1R	LEI; 1R	LEI; 1R	LEI; 1R	LEI; 1R	WIG; 2R	WIG; 1R	MIL; 1R	MIL; 4R	HIL; 1R	HIL; 1R	LEI; 2R	LEI; 1R	LEI; 2R	LEI; 4R	MIL; 2R	MIL; 1R	WIG; 1R	WIG; 1R	LEI; 1R	LEI; 3R	HIL; 1R	HIL; 1R	LEI; 2R	LEI; 1R	ROS; 2R	ROS; 1R	ROS; 3R	ROS; 1R	LEI; 1R	LEI; 3R

Performance Table Legend
W	Won the tournament	F	Finalist	SF	Semifinalist	QF	Quarterfinalist	#R; RR; Prel.	Lost in # round Round-robin; Preliminary round	DQ	Disqualified
DNQ	Did not qualify	DNP	Did not participate	WD	Withdrew	NH	Tournament not held	#R; RR; Prel.	Lost in # round Round-robin; Preliminary round	NYF	Not yet founded
