= Ben Hazel =

English darts player (born 1990)

Personal information
- Nickname: "Mr Ben"
- Born: 22 May 1990 (age 36) Hertfordshire, England
- Home town: Woolmer Green, Hertfordshire, England

Sport
- Sport: Darts
- Playing since: 2013
- Darts: 23g
- Laterality: Right-handed
- Walk-on music: "Freed from Desire" by GALA

Organisation (see split in darts)
- BDO: 2015–2020
- WDF: 2015–
- Current world ranking: (WDF) NR (17 August 2026)

WDF major events – best performances
- World Championship: Last 16: 2020
- World Masters: Last 128: 2019

Other tournament wins
- Years
Vilnius Open	2018

Ben Hazel (born 22 May 1990) is an English professional darts player who plays in World Darts Federation (WDF) events.

== Career ==
In May 2018, Hazel won the Vilnius Open, he beat Łukasz Wacławski in the final. In 2019, he reached Quarter-Finals in both the Swedish and Belfry Open.

In October 2019, he qualified for the 2020 BDO World Darts Championship as one of the Playoff Qualifiers, he defeated Jesús Noguera and Allan Edwards to secure his place in the tournament. He beat Joe Chaney in the preliminary round and Gary Robson in the last 32, before losing to Chris Landman.

== World Championship results ==
=== BDO/WDF ===
- 2020: Third round (lost to Chris Landman 3–4) (sets)
- 2022: Second round (lost to Luke Littler 2–3)
