= Brian Raman =

Belgian darts player (born 1996)

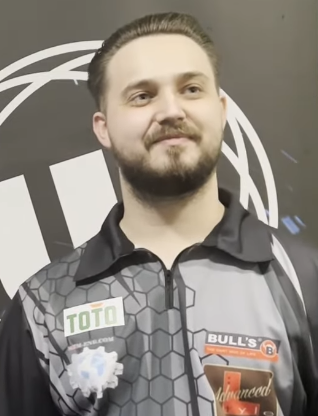
- Raman in 2024

Personal information
- Nickname: "The Riddler"
- Born: 14 October 1996 (age 30) Schoten, Belgium
- Home town: Wuustwezel, Belgium

Sport
- Sport: Darts
- Playing since: 2012
- Darts: 24g Bull's Signature
- Laterality: Right-handed
- Walk-on music: "The Business" by Tiësto

Organisation (see split in darts)
- BDO: 2014–2020
- PDC: 2015– (Tour Card: 2022–23)
- WDF: 2014–2022, 2024–
- Current world ranking: (WDF) 34 ▲1 (17 August 2026)

WDF major events – best performances
- World Championship: Quarter-final: 2022
- World Masters: Runner-up: 2026
- Dutch Open: Last 32: 2025, 2026

PDC premier events – best performances
- UK Open: Last 96: 2022

Other tournament wins
- Years
Belfry Open	2019
Denmark Masters	2019
England Open	2021
Italian Open	2024
Romanian Open	2025
Swedish Masters	2025

Brian Raman (born 14 October 1996) is a Belgian darts player who competes in World Darts Federation (WDF) and Professional Darts Corporation (PDC) events. In 2021, he became the second Belgian WDF world number one, after Leo Laurens in 1993. Raman has won 6 WDF ranking titles.

== Career ==
In 2019, Raman won the Denmark Masters, beating Willem Mandigers in the Final. In September 2019, he qualified for the 2020 BDO World Darts Championship and played Paul Hogan in the Preliminary Round, losing 3 sets to 1. In 2020, he attended PDC Q-school, where he reached a semi-final on day one of the final phase, losing out to Harald Leitinger.

Raman won a PDC Tour Card at 2022 Q-School by winning the second event of the final phase. He beat Jules van Dongen in the final 6–4.

During his two years as a PDC Tour Card holder, he was unable to reach the top 64 of the PDC Order of Merit, hampered by a shoulder injury which required surgery in late 2023. Thus, he failed to retain his Tour Card, As a result, he attended 2024 Q-School. He was unable to win a new Tour Card and subsequently returned to playing WDF events. He has won two WDF ranking titles in 2025.

== World Championship results ==
=== BDO ===
- 2020: Preliminary round (lost to Paul Hogan 1–3)

=== WDF ===
- 2022: Quarter-finals (lost to Richard Veenstra 2–4)
- 2024: Third round (lost to François Schweyen 2–3)
- 2025: First round (lost to Jeffrey Sparidaans 2–3)

== Career finals ==
=== WDF major finals: 1 (0 titles) ===
Legend
World Masters (0–1)

Outcome	No.	Year	Championship	Opponent in the final	Score
Runner-up	1.	2026	World Masters	(United States) Chris Lim	6–7 (l)

== Performance timeline ==
=== BDO ===
Tournament	2015	2016	2017	2019	2020
BDO Ranked televised events
World Championship	Did not qualify				Prel.
World Masters	1R	3R	1R	2R	NH

=== WDF ===
Tournament	2022	2024	2025	2026
WDF Ranked major/platinum events
World Championship	QF	3R	1R	
World Masters	PDC	3R	RR	F

=== PDC ===
Tournament	2017	2018	2019	2020	2021	2022	2023
PDC Ranked televised events
UK Open	Non-PDC		1R	DNQ	1R	3R	2R
PDC Non-ranked televised events
World Youth Championship	1R	2R	DNP	QF	DNP		
Career statistics
Season-end ranking (PDC)	-	229	-	173	-	111	89

==== European Tour ====
Tournament	2022	2023	2024
International Darts Open	3R	2R	DNQ
German Darts Open	DNQ	QF	DNQ
Flanders Darts Trophy	NH		1R

==== Players Championships ====
Season	1	2	3	4	5	6	7	8	9	10	11	12	13	14	15	16	17	18	19	20	21	22	23	24	25	26	27	28	29	30
2020	DNP						BAR; 2R	BAR; 1R	Did not participate					NIE; 1R	NIE; 1R	NIE; 2R	NIE; 1R	NIE; 2R	Did not participate											
2022	BAR; 3R	BAR; 1R	WIG; 2R	WIG; 1R	BAR; 1R	BAR; 1R	NIE; 2R	NIE; 1R	BAR; 3R	BAR; 1R	BAR; 1R	BAR; DNP		WIG; 1R	WIG; 1R	NIE; 2R	NIE; 2R	BAR; 3R	BAR; 4R	BAR; 1R	BAR; 1R	BAR; 2R	BAR; 3R	BAR; 3R	BAR; 1R	BAR; 2R	BAR; 1R	BAR; 1R	BAR; 2R	BAR; 1R
2023	BAR; 2R	BAR; 2R	BAR; 2R	BAR; 2R	BAR; 2R	BAR; 1R	HIL; 1R	HIL; 1R	WIG; 1R	WIG; 3R	LEI; 1R	LEI; 1R	HIL; 1R	HIL; 1R	LEI; 1R	LEI; 3R	HIL; 2R	HIL; 1R	BAR; 1R	BAR; 1R	BAR; 3R	BAR; 1R	BAR; 1R	BAR; 1R	BAR; 1R	BAR; 1R	BAR; 2R	BAR; 1R	BAR; 1R	BAR; 2R

Performance Table Legend
W	Won the tournament	F	Finalist	SF	Semifinalist	QF	Quarterfinalist	#R; RR; Prel.	Lost in # round Round-robin; Preliminary round	DQ	Disqualified
DNQ	Did not qualify	DNP	Did not participate	WD	Withdrew	NH	Tournament not held	#R; RR; Prel.	Lost in # round Round-robin; Preliminary round	NYF	Not yet founded
