= 2019 BDO World Trophy =

BDO World Trophy

Tournament information
- Dates: 30 August - 1 September 2019
- Venue: King George's Hall
- Location: Blackburn
- Country: England
- Organisation(s): BDO
- Format: Legs; Finals: best of 15 (men) best of 11 (women)
- Prize fund: £34,000 (men) £13,500 (women)
- Winner's share: £8,000 (men) £3,000 (women)
- High checkout: 170 (England) Andy Hamilton (Men's second round)

Champion(s)
- (Wales) Jim Williams (men) (England) Lisa Ashton (women)

The 2019 BDO World Trophy was a major darts tournament run by the British Darts Organisation. It was held between 30 August and 1 September 2019 at King George's Hall, Blackburn, England.

Glen Durrant and Fallon Sherrock were the defending champions, after beating Michael Unterbuchner (10–7) and Lorraine Winstanley (6–3) respectively in the finals of last year's edition. However, Durrant was unable to defend his title after his switch to the PDC, while Sherrock lost 4–3 to Mikuru Suzuki in the first round.

Jim Williams claimed his maiden major title by beating Richard Veenstra 8–6 in the men's final, while Lisa Ashton won her third World Trophy after a 6–2 win over Anastasia Dobromyslova in the women's final.

== Competitors ==
=== Men ===
Top 16 in BDO Rankings

1. (Netherlands) Richard Veenstra (runner-up)
2. (Wales) Jim Williams (champion)
3. (Netherlands) Wesley Harms (quarter-finals)
4. (England) Scott Mitchell (second round)
5. (Germany) Michael Unterbuchner (first round)
6. (England) Dave Parletti (first round)
7. (England) Gary Robson (first round)
8. (England) Scott Waites (first round)
9. (Wales) Wayne Warren (second round)
10. (Netherlands) Willem Mandigers (second round)
11. (Netherlands) Chris Landman (first round)
12. (Belgium) Mario Vandenbogaerde (second round)
13. (Scotland) Ross Montgomery (first round)
14. (England) Andy Hamilton (second round)
15. (Netherlands) Derk Telnekes (first round)
16. (Northern Ireland) Kyle McKinstry (first round)

17–20 in BDO Rankings

17. (Wales) Nick Kenny (second round)
18. (Netherlands) Martijn Kleermaker (second round)
19. (England) Daniel Day (quarter-finals)
20. (England) Wes Newton (first round)

World Master

- (England) Adam Smith-Neale (first round)

Regional Qualifiers

- (United States) Joe Chaney (quarter-finals)
- (Belgium) Roger Janssen (quarter-finals)
- (New Zealand) Mark McGrath (semi-finals)
- (Poland) Sebastian Steyer (semi-finals)
- (England) Paul Hogan (first round)
- (Denmark) Brian Løkken (first round)
- (Australia) Justin Thompson (first round)

Play-Off Qualifiers

- (England) Scott Taylor (second round)
- (England) Martin Adams (first round)
- (England) Carl Hamilton (first round)
- (England) John Scott (first round)

=== Draw bracket ===
The draws were made on 4 August 2019 at the BDO AGM.

First Round (best of 9 legs)
1	(Netherlands) Richard Veenstra 90.76	5
Q	(Australia) Justin Thompson 87.36	2
16	(Northern Ireland) Kyle McKinstry 81.96	0
(Wales) Nick Kenny 92.78	5
8	(England) Scott Waites 97.69	1
(England) Daniel Day 90.42	5
9	(Wales) Wayne Warren 86.17	5
Q	(England) John Scott 79.77	3
5	(Germany) Michael Unterbuchner 91.90	4
Q	(Belgium) Roger Janssen 97.22	5
12	(Belgium) Mario Vandenbogaerde 94.57	5
Q	(Denmark) Brian Løkken 73.60	3
4	(England) Scott Mitchell 88.38	5
Q	(England) Martin Adams 81.73	3
13	(Scotland) Ross Montgomery 80.91	3
Q	(Poland) Sebastian Steyer 81.35	5
2	(Wales) Jim Williams 86.15	5
(England) Wes Newton 80.56	1
15	(Netherlands) Derk Telnekes 93.00	3
Q	(England) Scott Taylor 104.60	5
7	(England) Gary Robson 95.58	2
Q	(United States) Joe Chaney 92.83	5
10	(Netherlands) Willem Mandigers 75.83	5
Q	(England) Carl Hamilton 82.97	4
6	(England) Dave Parletti 86.26	1
(Netherlands) Martijn Kleermaker 93.53	5
11	(Netherlands) Chris Landman 83.19	3
Q	(New Zealand) Mark McGrath 86.36	5
3	(Netherlands) Wesley Harms 96.38	5
Q	(England) Paul Hogan 77.88	2
14	(England) Andy Hamilton 90.54	5
WC	(England) Adam Smith-Neale 95.96	0

Second Round (best of 9 legs)
1	(Netherlands) Richard Veenstra 87.40	5
(Wales) Nick Kenny 87.11	4
(England) Daniel Day 94.32	5
9	(Wales) Wayne Warren 98.95	4
Q	(Belgium) Roger Janssen 95.36	5
12	(Belgium) Mario Vandenbogaerde 99.83	3
4	(England) Scott Mitchell 94.03	4
Q	(Poland) Sebastian Steyer 95.38	5
2	(Wales) Jim Williams 89.53	5
Q	(England) Scott Taylor 83.17	4
Q	(United States) Joe Chaney 87.38	5
10	(Netherlands) Willem Mandigers 74.90	0
(Netherlands) Martijn Kleermaker 75.16	0
Q	(New Zealand) Mark McGrath 96.35	5
3	(Netherlands) Wesley Harms 90.68	5
14	(England) Andy Hamilton 92.70	3

Quarter-finals (best of 11 legs)
1	(Netherlands) Richard Veenstra 84.81	6
(England) Daniel Day 80.97	5
Q	(Belgium) Roger Janssen 77.49	4
Q	(Poland) Sebastian Steyer 78.27	6
2	(Wales) Jim Williams 90.95	6
Q	(United States) Joe Chaney 86.93	5
Q	(New Zealand) Mark McGrath 90.33	6
3	(Netherlands) Wesley Harms 88.10	5

Semi-finals (best of 13 legs)
1	(Netherlands) Richard Veenstra 80.01	7
Q	(Poland) Sebastian Steyer 79.25	4
2	(Wales) Jim Williams 92.57	7
Q	(New Zealand) Mark McGrath 81.99	2

Final (best of 15 legs)
1	(Netherlands) Richard Veenstra 84.67	6
2	(Wales) Jim Williams 85.36	8

=== Women ===
Top 8 in BDO Rankings
1. (England) Lisa Ashton (champion)
2. (England) Lorraine Winstanley (semi-finals)
3. (England) Deta Hedman (first round)
4. (Netherlands) Aileen de Graaf (semi-finals)
5. (England) Fallon Sherrock (first round)
6. (Russia) Anastasia Dobromyslova (runner-up)
7. (England) Laura Turner (quarter-finals)
8. (England) Trina Gulliver (first round)

9–14 in BDO Rankings

9. (England) Maria O'Brien (quarter-finals)
10. (England) Casey Gallagher (quarter-finals)
11. (Netherlands) Sharon Prins (first round)
12. (England) Paula Jacklin (first round)
13. (Australia) Corrine Hammond (first round)
14. (Japan) Mikuru Suzuki (quarter-finals)

Play-Off Qualifiers

- (Netherlands) Priscilla Steenbergen (first round)
- (England) Kirsty Hutchinson (first round)

=== Draw bracket ===
First Round (best of 7 legs)
1	(England) Lisa Ashton 77.08	4
(Australia) Corrine Hammond 74.67	0
8	(England) Trina Gulliver 53.36	0
(England) Casey Gallagher 60.12	4
4	(Netherlands) Aileen de Graaf 81.24	4
Q	(Netherlands) Priscilla Steenbergen 54.67	0
5	(England) Fallon Sherrock 81.29	3
(Japan) Mikuru Suzuki 88.17	4
2	(England) Lorraine Winstanley 87.08	4
Q	(England) Kirsty Hutchinson 84.42	3
7	(England) Laura Turner 72.03	4
(England) Paula Jacklin 62.91	1
3	(England) Deta Hedman 71.93	3
(England) Maria O'Brien 78.16	4
6	(Russia) Anastasia Dobromyslova 85.89	4
(Netherlands) Sharon Prins 72.68	0

Quarter-finals (best of 7 legs)
1	(England) Lisa Ashton 86.94	4
(England) Casey Gallagher 75.12	2
4	(Netherlands) Aileen de Graaf 78.87	4
(Japan) Mikuru Suzuki 71.95	2
2	(England) Lorraine Winstanley 75.15	4
7	(England) Laura Turner 71.31	0
(England) Maria O'Brien 72.56	1
6	(Russia) Anastasia Dobromyslova 88.13	4

Semi-finals (best of 9 legs)
1	(England) Lisa Ashton 79.92	5
4	(Netherlands) Aileen de Graaf 82.86	4
2	(England) Lorraine Winstanley 75.00	0
6	(Russia) Anastasia Dobromyslova 81.68	5

Final (best of 11 legs)
1	(England) Lisa Ashton 81.04	6
6	(Russia) Anastasia Dobromyslova 78.82	2
