= Joe Chaney =

American darts player

Personal information
- Nickname: "Chainsaw"
- Home town: Harrison, Tennessee, U.S.

Sport
- Sport: Darts
- Playing since: 1994
- Darts: 24g Shot
- Laterality: Right-handed
- Walk-on music: "Chainsaw" by Family Force 5

Organisation (see split in darts)
- BDO: 2010–2020
- PDC: 2006–2009
- WDF: 2010–

WDF major events – best performances
- World Championship: Last 40: 2018, 2020
- World Masters: Last 80: 2017
- World Trophy: Quarter Final: 2019

PDC premier events – best performances
- US Open/WSoD: Last 32: 2006

Other tournament wins
- Years
ADO Americas Cup – Barbados	2016
ADO Battle of Stones River	2014, 2015, 2016
ADO Blueberry Hill Open	2014
ADO Chicago Open	2012
ADO Choo Choo Classic	2011, 2017
ADO Colorado Open	2016
ADO Early Bird	2012, 2015
ADO Fire on the Mountain	2013, 2014
ADO Firecracker Open	2010, 2014
ADO Foothills Fling	2013
ADO Garden City Classic	2014
ADO Ghost On The Coast	2016
ADO Savannah Open	2012, 2015
ADO Yoda’S Jedi Master Tourney	2016
Camellia Classic	2017
Charlotte Open	2016
Colorado Open	2016
Las Vegas Open	2017

Joe Chaney is an American darts player playing mainly in British Darts Organisation (BDO) events.

== Career ==
In 2017, Chaney reached the Last 80 of the World Masters and Last 32 of the BDO World Trophy. He qualified for the 2018 BDO World Darts Championship as one of the Regional Table Qualifiers and lost to Danny Noppert in the preliminary round.

== World Championship results ==
=== BDO ===
- 2018: Preliminary round (lost to Danny Noppert 0–3)
- 2020: Preliminary round (lost to Ben Hazel 2–3)
