= 2018 Finder Darts Masters =

Finder Darts Masters

Tournament information
- Dates: 7–9 December 2018
- Venue: Hotel Zuiderduin
- Location: Egmond aan Zee
- Country: The Netherlands
- Organisation(s): BDO
- Format: Legs (group stage); Sets (knock-out stage); Final – best of 9 sets (men); Final – best of 3 sets (women)
- Prize fund: €33,500
- Winner's share: €5,000
- High checkout: 170 (England) Glen Durrant

Champion(s)
- (England) Glen Durrant (men) (England) Lisa Ashton (women) (Republic of Ireland) Keane Barry (youth)

The 2018 Finder Darts Masters was a major darts tournament run by the British Darts Organisation. It was held between 7 and 9 December 2018 at Hotel Zuiderduin, Egmond aan Zee.

== Prize money ==
Stage	Prize money (Total €33,500)
Winner	€ 5,000
Runner-up	€ 2,500
Semi-final	€ 2,000
Quarter-final	€ 1,500
Last 24	€ 1,000

== Men ==
=== Qualifiers ===
Seeds

1. (Wales) Jim Williams
2. (Netherlands) Willem Mandigers
3. (England) Mark McGeeney
4. (Netherlands) Richard Veenstra
5. (Netherlands) Derk Telnekes
6. (England) Scott Mitchell
7. (England) Glen Durrant
8. (Netherlands) Chris Landman

Other qualifiers

- (England) Gary Robson
- (Netherlands) Wesley Harms
- (Wales) Dean Reynolds
- (Germany) Michael Unterbuchner
- (England) Scott Waites
- (England) Conan Whitehead
- (Wales) Wayne Warren
- (Belgium) Jeffrey Van Egdom
- (Netherlands) Jeffrey Sparidaans
- (England) Andy Hamilton
- (Scotland) Ross Montgomery
- (England) Daniel Day
- (England) Tony O'Shea
- (England) Martin Adams
- (Netherlands) Martijn Kleermaker
- (Netherlands) Wouter Vaes

=== Group stage ===
==== Group A ====
Pos.	Player	P	W	L	LF	LA	+/−	Pts	Status
1	(Wales) Jim Williams (1)	2	2	0	10	5	+5	4	Q
2	(Netherlands) Jeffrey Sparidaans	2	1	1	6	5	+1	2	Eliminated
3	(Belgium) Jeffrey Van Egdom	2	0	2	4	10	-6	0	Eliminated

Jeffrey Van Egdom (Belgium)	0 – 5	(Netherlands) Jeffrey Sparidaans
Jim Williams (Wales)	5 – 4	(Belgium) Jeffrey Van Egdom
Jim Williams (Wales)	5 – 1	(Netherlands) Jeffrey Sparidaans

==== Group B ====
Pos.	Player	P	W	L	LF	LA	+/−	Pts	Status
1	(Wales) Wayne Warren	2	2	0	10	7	+3	4	Q
2	(Netherlands) Chris Landman (8)	2	1	1	9	9	0	2	Eliminated
3	(England) Martin Adams	2	0	2	7	10	-3	0	Eliminated

Martin Adams (England)	3 – 5	(Wales) Wayne Warren
Chris Landman (Netherlands)	5 – 4	(England) Martin Adams
Chris Landman (Netherlands)	4 – 5	(Wales) Wayne Warren

==== Group C ====
Pos.	Player	P	W	L	LF	LA	+/−	Pts	Status
1	(Netherlands) Derk Telnekes (5)	2	2	0	10	1	+9	4	Q
2	(Scotland) Ross Montgomery	2	1	1	5	8	-3	2	Eliminated
3	(Netherlands) Martijn Kleermaker	2	0	2	4	10	-6	0	Eliminated

Martijn Kleermaker (Netherlands)	3 – 5	(Scotland) Ross Montgomery
Derk Telnekes (Netherlands)	5 – 1	(Netherlands) Martijn Kleermaker
Derk Telnekes (Netherlands)	5 – 0	(Scotland) Ross Montgomery

==== Group D ====
Pos.	Player	P	W	L	LF	LA	+/−	Pts	Status
1	(Netherlands) Richard Veenstra (4)	2	2	0	10	6	+4	4	Q
2	(Netherlands) Wesley Harms	2	1	1	9	6	+3	2	Eliminated
3	(Wales) Dean Reynolds	2	0	2	3	10	-7	0	Eliminated

Wesley Harms (Netherlands)	5 – 1	(Wales) Dean Reynolds
Richard Veenstra (Netherlands)	5 – 2	(Wales) Dean Reynolds
Richard Veenstra (Netherlands)	5 – 4	(Netherlands) Wesley Harms

==== Group E ====
Pos.	Player	P	W	L	LF	LA	+/−	Pts	Status
1	(England) Mark McGeeney (3)	2	2	0	10	8	+2	4	Q
2	(England) Andy Hamilton	2	1	1	9	9	0	2	Eliminated
3	(Germany) Michael Unterbuchner	2	0	2	8	10	-2	0	Eliminated

Michael Unterbuchner (Germany)	4 – 5	(England) Andy Hamilton
Mark McGeeney (England)	5 – 4	(Germany) Michael Unterbuchner
Mark McGeeney (England)	5 – 4	(England) Andy Hamilton

==== Group F ====
Pos.	Player	P	W	L	LF	LA	+/−	Pts	Status
1	(England) Scott Mitchell (6)	2	2	0	10	7	+3	4	Q
2	(Netherlands) Wouter Vaes	2	1	1	9	9	0	2	Eliminated
3	(England) Daniel Day	2	0	2	7	10	-3	0	Eliminated

Daniel Day (England)	4 – 5	(Netherlands) Wouter Vaes
Scott Mitchell (England)	5 – 3	(England) Daniel Day
Scott Mitchell (England)	5 – 4	(Netherlands) Wouter Vaes

==== Group G ====
Pos.	Player	P	W	L	LF	LA	+/−	Pts	Status
1	(England) Glen Durrant (7)	2	2	0	10	7	+3	4	Q
2	(England) Gary Robson	2	1	1	8	8	0	2	Eliminated
3	(England) Scott Waites	2	0	2	7	10	-3	0	Eliminated

Gary Robson (England)	5 – 3	(England) Scott Waites
Glen Durrant (England)	5 – 4	(England) Scott Waites
Glen Durrant (England)	5 – 3	(England) Gary Robson

==== Group H ====
Pos.	Player	P	W	L	LF	LA	+/−	Pts	Status
1	(England) Conan Whitehead	2	2	0	10	3	+7	4	Q
2	(Netherlands) Willem Mandigers (2)	2	1	1	7	7	0	2	Eliminated
3	(England) Tony O'Shea	2	0	2	3	10	-7	0	Eliminated

Tony O'Shea (England)	1 – 5	(England) Conan Whitehead
Willem Mandigers (Netherlands)	5 – 2	(England) Tony O'Shea
Willem Mandigers (Netherlands)	2 – 5	(England) Conan Whitehead

=== Knockout phase ===
Quarterfinals
1	(Wales) Jim Williams 90.40	3
(Wales) Wayne Warren 88.97	2
5	(Netherlands) Derk Telnekes 79.96	1
4	(Netherlands) Richard Veenstra 87.16	3
3	(England) Mark McGeeney 94.59	3
6	(England) Scott Mitchell 91.49	2
7	(England) Glen Durrant 94.35	3
(England) Conan Whitehead 89.59	1

Semifinals
1	(Wales) Jim Williams 87.49	1
4	(Netherlands) Richard Veenstra 89.41	3
3	(England) Mark McGeeney 94.91	1
7	(England) Glen Durrant 99.34	3

Finals
4	(Netherlands) Richard Veenstra 92.11	3
7	(England) Glen Durrant 100.60	5

== Women ==
=== Qualifiers ===
Seeds

1. (England) Deta Hedman
2. (Netherlands) Aileen de Graaf

Other Qualifiers

- (Netherlands) Sharon Prins
- (Netherlands) Astrid Trouwborst
- (England) Lisa Ashton
- (England) Fallon Sherrock

=== Group stage ===
==== Group A ====
Pos.	Player	P	W	L	LF	LA	+/−	Pts	Status
1	(England) Fallon Sherrock	2	2	0	8	3	+5	4	Q
2	(Netherlands) Astrid Trouwborst	2	1	1	4	7	-3	2	Eliminated
3	(England) Deta Hedman (1)	2	0	2	6	8	-2	0	Eliminated

Astrid Trouwborst (Netherlands)	0 – 4	(England) Fallon Sherrock
Deta Hedman (England)	3 – 4	(Netherlands) Astrid Trouwborst
Deta Hedman (England)	3 – 4	(England) Fallon Sherrock

==== Group B ====
Pos.	Player	P	W	L	LF	LA	+/−	Pts	Status
1	(England) Lisa Ashton	2	2	0	8	3	+5	4	Q
2	(Netherlands) Aileen de Graaf (2)	2	1	1	7	6	+1	2	Eliminated
3	(Netherlands) Sharon Prins	2	0	2	2	8	-6	0	Eliminated

Sharon Prins (Netherlands)	0 – 4	(England) Lisa Ashton
Aileen de Graaf (Netherlands)	4 – 2	(Netherlands) Sharon Prins
Aileen de Graaf (Netherlands)	3 – 4	(England) Lisa Ashton

=== Final ===
Av.	Player	Score	Player	Av.
84.58	Fallon Sherrock (England)	1 – 2	(England) Lisa Ashton	88.68

== Youth ==
=== Qualifiers ===
- (Netherlands) Lars Plaisier
- (Netherlands) Jurjen van der Velde
- (Republic of Ireland) Keane Barry
- (Scotland) Nathan Girvan
- (Netherlands) Levy Frauenfelder
- (Netherlands) Kevin Lasker

=== Group stage ===
==== Group A ====
Pos.	Player	P	W	L	LF	LA	+/−	Pts	Status
1	(Netherlands) Levy Frauenfelder	2	2	0	8	3	+5	4	Q
2	(Netherlands) Jurjen van der Velde	2	1	1	6	4	+2	2	Eliminated
3	(Netherlands) Kevin Lasker	2	0	2	1	8	-7	0	Eliminated

Levy Frauenfelder (Netherlands)	4 – 2	(Netherlands) Jurjen van der Velde
Kevin Lasker (Netherlands)	0 – 4	(Netherlands) Jurjen van der Velde
Kevin Lasker (Netherlands)	1 – 4	(Netherlands) Levy Frauenfelder

==== Group B ====
Pos.	Player	P	W	L	LF	LA	+/−	Pts	Status
1	(Republic of Ireland) Keane Barry	2	2	0	8	0	+8	4	Q
2	(Scotland) Nathan Girvan	2	1	1	4	6	-2	2	Eliminated
3	(Netherlands) Lars Plaisier	2	0	2	2	8	-6	0	Eliminated

Keane Barry (Republic of Ireland)	4 – 0	(Scotland) Nathan Girvan
Lars Plaisier (Netherlands)	2 – 4	(Scotland) Nathan Girvan
Lars Plaisier (Netherlands)	0 – 4	(Republic of Ireland) Keane Barry

=== Final ===
Av.	Player	Score	Player	Av.
80.52	Levy Frauenfelder (Netherlands)	0 – 2	(Republic of Ireland) Keane Barry	75.47
