= Jeffrey Sparidaans =

Dutch darts player (born 1993)

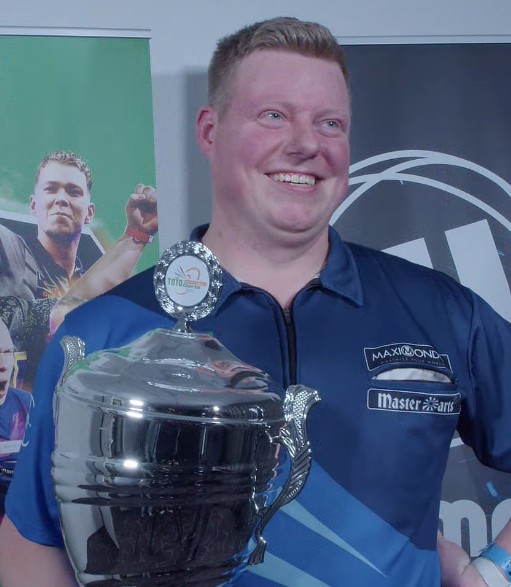
- Sparidaans with the Dutch Open trophy

Personal information
- Nickname: "Jefke"
- Born: 8 September 1993 (age 33) Tilburg, Netherlands

Sport
- Sport: Darts
- Playing since: 2010
- Darts: 24g Masterdarts
- Laterality: Right-handed
- Walk-on music: "Enter Sandman" by Metallica

Organisation (see split in darts)
- BDO: 2016–2020
- PDC: 2023– (Tour Card 2023–2024; 2026–)
- WDF: 2016–2022, 2025
- Current world ranking: (PDC) 112 (29 October 2026)

WDF major events – best performances
- World Championship: Last 32: 2025
- World Masters: Last 80: 2017
- World Trophy: Last 32: 2018
- Finder Masters: Last 24: 2016, 2018
- Dutch Open: Winner (1): 2025

PDC premier events – best performances
- UK Open: Last 128: 2024

Other tournament wins
- Years
Czech Open	2015
England Classic	2017
Hungarian Classic	2017
Swiss Open	2016
Vilnius Open	2019
Medal record
Men's Darts
Representing Netherlands
WDF World Cup
Gold medal – first place	2019 Cluj	Men's overall
Bronze medal – third place	2019 Cluj	Men's pairs
Bronze medal – third place	2019 Cluj	Men's team
WDF Europe Cup
Gold medal – first place	2016 Egmond aan Zee	Men's overall
Silver medal – second place	2016 Egmond aan Zee	Men's team
WDF Europe Cup Youth
Gold medal – first place	2009 Veldhoven	Boys team
Silver medal – second place	2010 Kirchheim	Boys team

Jeffrey Sparidaans (born 8 September 1993) is a Dutch professional darts player who competes in Professional Darts Corporation (PDC) and World Darts Federation (WDF) events. He has won six WDF ranking titles, including the 2025 Dutch Open.

== Career ==
=== 2015 ===
In 2015, Sparidaans won the Czech Open.

=== 2016 ===
In 2016, he won the Swiss Open. He also reached the second round of the 2016 World Masters, losing to Toon Greebe 3–2 in a deciding set.

=== 2017 ===
In 2017, he won the England Classic and Hungarian Classic. Sparidaans also reached the third round of the 2017 World Masters where he lost to William Borland 3–2 in a deciding set.

=== 2018 ===
He qualified for the 2018 BDO World Darts Championship virtue of being 25th in the rankings, making his debut, but was whitewashed 3–0 by Dennis Nilsson in the preliminary round.

=== 2019 ===
Spaaridaans reached the semi-finals at the 2019 Romanian Classic, but lost to the eventual champion John Michael in the semi-finals.

=== 2023 ===
Sparidaans won a PDC Tour Card for the first time at the 2023's European Q-School. He won day one of the final stage, defeating Jan de Weerdt, Patrick Maat and Jacob Taylor each 6–3, Maik Kuivenhoven 6–1 averaging 95.92, Owen Roelofs 6–4, and Jacques Labre also 6–4, with a 101.62 average before defeating Ronny Huybrechts 6–3 in the final to secure his Tour card for the 2023 and 2024 seasons.

On the 2023 PDC Pro Tour Sparidaans reached the last 16 of a Players Championship event on four occasions. At the ET8 Tour Card Holder Qualifier he defeated the qualifier's 12th seed Chris Dobey 6–3, and Robbie Knops 6–2 to qualify for the Czech Darts Open event on the PDC European Tour. He lost to home favourite Karel Sedláček 6–5 in a deciding leg in the first round.

=== 2024 ===
On the 2024 PDC Pro Tour Sparidaans competed in the 2024 PDC Players Championship series, reaching the last 16 of an event on three occasions. At the ET4 Tour Card Holder Qualifier he whitewashed Lee Evans 6–0, and defeated Josh Payne and Steve Beaton 6–5 in last–leg deciders to qualify for the 2024 European Darts Grand Prix (ET4), where he beat Callan Rydz 6–1 in the first round before losing 6–2 to 8th seed Josh Rock in the second round.

=== 2025 ===
After losing his Tour Card, Sparidaans participated in the Dutch Open, where he became the fourth consecutive Dutch player to win the tournament after defeating David Fatum 3–0 in the final.

== World Championship results ==
=== BDO/WDF ===
- 2018: Preliminary round (lost to Dennis Nilsson 0–3)
- 2025: Second round (lost to François Schweyen 2–3)

== Performance timeline ==
=== BDO ===
Tournament	2015	2016	2017	2018
BDO Ranked televised events
World Championship	DNQ			Prel.
World Trophy	DNQ			1R
World Masters	1R	2R	3R	1R
Finder Masters	DNQ	RR	DNQ	RR

=== WDF ===
Tournament	2015	2016	2017	2018	2019	2020	2022	2025
WDF televised events
World Championship	Not held						PDC	2R
Dutch Open	8R	3R	6R	7R	8R	8R	7R	W

=== PDC ===
Tournament	2023	2024
PDC Ranked televised events
UK Open	1R	2R
Career statistics
Season-end ranking	117	81

==== PDC European Tour ====
Season	1	2	3	4	5	6	7	8	9	10	11	12	13	
2023	Did not qualify							CDO; 1R	Did not qualify					
2024	DNQ			EDG; 2R	Did not qualify									
2026	Did not qualify						IDO; 1R	Did not qualify						DDC

==== PDC Players Championships ====
Season	1	2	3	4	5	6	7	8	9	10	11	12	13	14	15	16	17	18	19	20	21	22	23	24	25	26	27	28	29	30	31	32	33	34
2023	BAR; 1R	BAR; 1R	BAR; 3R	BAR; 4R	BAR; 1R	BAR; 1R	HIL; 4R	HIL; 3R	WIG; 2R	WIG; 4R	LEI; 1R	LEI; 1R	HIL; 1R	HIL; 4R	LEI; 2R	LEI; 3R	HIL; 1R	HIL; 1R	BAR; 2R	BAR; 1R	BAR; 1R	BAR; 1R	BAR; 1R	BAR; 1R	BAR; 2R	BAR; 1R	BAR; 1R	BAR; 4R	BAR; 1R	BAR; 1R				
2024	WIG; 2R	WIG; 1R	LEI; 4R	LEI; 1R	HIL; 1R	HIL; 2R	LEI; 2R	LEI; 1R	HIL; 2R	HIL; 1R	HIL; 4R	HIL; 1R	MIL; 2R	MIL; 1R	MIL; 2R	MIL; 2R	MIL; 2R	MIL; 1R	MIL; 4R	WIG; 1R	WIG; 2R	MIL; 1R	MIL; 3R	WIG; 1R	WIG; 1R	WIG; 1R	WIG; 1R	WIG; 2R	LEI; 2R	LEI; 1R				
2026	HIL; 1R	HIL; 1R	WIG; 2R	WIG; 1R	LEI; 1R	LEI; 2R	LEI; QF	LEI; 2R	WIG; 1R	WIG; 2R	MIL; 3R	MIL; 1R	HIL; 1R	HIL; 1R	LEI; 1R	LEI; 1R	LEI; 2R	LEI; 4R	MIL; 1R	MIL; 1R	WIG; 1R	WIG; 3R	LEI; 2R	LEI; 2R	HIL; 1R	HIL; 1R	LEI; 3R	LEI; 1R	ROS; 1R	ROS; 1R	ROS; 1R	ROS; 2R	LEI; 1R	LEI; 2R

Key

Performance Table Legend
W	Won the tournament	F	Finalist	SF	Semifinalist	QF	Quarterfinalist	#R; RR; Prel.	Lost in # round Round-robin; Preliminary round	DQ	Disqualified
DNQ	Did not qualify	DNP	Did not participate	WD	Withdrew	NH	Tournament not held	#R; RR; Prel.	Lost in # round Round-robin; Preliminary round	NYF	Not yet founded
