= Jim Williams (darts player) =

Welsh darts player (born 1984)

Personal information
- Nickname: "The Quiff"
- Born: 27 July 1984 (age 42) Cardiff, Wales
- Home town: Easthampton, Herefordshire, England

Sport
- Sport: Darts
- Playing since: 2004
- Darts: 25g One80 Signature
- Laterality: Right-handed
- Walk-on music: "Hit Me with Your Best Shot" by Pat Benatar

Organisation (see split in darts)
- BDO: 2012–2020
- PDC: 2021–present (Tour Card: 2022–2025)
- WDF: 2012–2021

WDF major events – best performances
- World Championship: Runner-up: 2020
- World Masters: Semi-final: 2018
- World Trophy: Winner (1): 2019
- Finder Masters: Runner-up: 2017

PDC premier events – best performances
- World Championship: Last 32: 2023, 2024
- UK Open: Last 64: 2022, 2023
- Grand Slam: Group Stage: 2018, 2019, 2021
- PC Finals: Last 64: 2022, 2023, 2024

Other tournament wins
- Years
MAD Darts Welsh Belt Winner	2020
UKDA National Singles Champion	2023, 2024
BDO/WDF Events (x12)
Antwerp Open (x2)	2015, 2017
BDO International Open	2018
Belfry Open	2018
Bruges Open	2018
England Masters	2018
England Open	2019
French Open	2017
Northern Ireland Open	2018
Scottish Open	2020
Swiss Open	2017
Turkish Open	2015
Players Championships
2022 PC6
PDC Challenge Tour (x2)
2020, 2021
Medal record
Men's Darts
Representing Wales
WDF World Cup
Gold medal – first place	2015 Antalja	Men's singles
Gold medal – first place	2019 Cluj	Men's team

Jim Williams (born 27 July 1984) is a Welsh professional darts player who competes in Professional Darts Corporation (PDC) events. He won his first PDC ranking title at 2022 Players Championship 6.

Williams previously competed in British Darts Organisation (BDO) tournaments. He won the 2019 BDO World Trophy and finished as the runner-up at the 2020 BDO World Championship.

== Career ==
In October 2012, Williams first rose to prominence at the 2012 Winmau World Masters. There he beat four players in the preliminary rounds to reach the main stage, most notably defeating reigning Lakeside World Champion Christian Kist 3–2 in his final match. Once on stage, he beat established campaigners Jan Dekker 3–1 and Ross Montgomery 3–2 to reach the quarter-finals, before losing out to eventual champion Stephen Bunting 3–1 in sets.

In February 2013, he came closest to winning his first BDO ranking title, beating Jan Dekker and Remco van Eijden to reach the Scottish Open final, before losing to Wesley Harms 5–4. In April, he made it to the semi-finals of the German Open, beating Paul Jennings and Richie George, but lost to champion Geert De Vos. One week later, he defeated Glen Durrant, Tony Eccles and John Walton to reach the last 4 of the Polish Open, but was beaten by Jeffrey de Graaf. In the Autumn, he lost to Tony O'Shea in the semis of the Romanian Open, and a fourth semi-final placing in 2013 came at the Northern Ireland Open. Add to that three further quarter final results last year and it amounts to a seeding place at Williams' first Lakeside. Williams made his debut at Lakeside in 2014 as the sole Welsh representative in the men's competition, and hoped to emulate countrymen Leighton Rees, Richie Burnett and Mark Webster by becoming BDO World Champion, but lost in the first round to Dave Prins.

In 2015, on the tour, Williams had some successful tournament runs, including a Final at the German Masters, losing out 6–4 to Wesley Harms. A last-8 in his home Welsh Open before eventually losing out to eventual winner Glen Durrant 4–0. Then a semi-final at the Polish Open, losing out to eventual winner Darius Labanauskas. Another final at the England national after defeating World number one Glen Durrant and Berkshire's Jason Heaver in the semi-final, he eventually lost out 6–5 to Cambridgeshire's Dennis Harbour. Another Quarter-final at Belgian Open where he lost out 4–2 the eventual winner Jeffrey de Graaf. Then his first ranking event title came at the Antwerp Open where he beat Brian Dawson in the quarters Fabian Roosenbrand in the semi-final before defeating Sven Verndock 2–0 in sets to become the 2015 Antwerp Open Champion. Also in 2015, Williams became Welsh individuals champion defeating Wayne Warren 2–0 in sets in the final. He also collected his first Welsh cap in the six nations of darts, and has been called up to represent Wales at the World cup in Turkey. In October, he went on to reach the final of the English classic, defeating Darryl Fitton 5–4 in the semi-final before going on to lose 6–2 to good friend Glen Durrant in the final. He then went on to the World Masters in Hull, losing out in the last 32 3 sets to 1 to Darius Labanauskas. He then went on to the Turkish Open, completing the singles and pairs double, winning the pairs with fellow countryman Martin Phillips, and then going on to defeat Phillips in the singles final 6–5 in legs to become the 2015 Turkish Open Champion.

=== PDC ===
In 2019, Williams attempted to secure a PDC Tour Card. After failing to get a Tour card, which would have allowed Williams to compete within the Professional Darts Corporation, he told Dartsnews.com: "I am definitely staying with the BDO. I will possibly do a few PDC Challenge Tours but I’m not sure to be honest." In 2020, he reached the BDO World Championship final, but lost to Wayne Warren 7–4 in sets. This turned out to be the last ever BDO World Championship final, as the organization went into liquidation later that year. After failing to secure a PDC tour card for both the 2020 and 2021 PDC Pro Tour, Williams finally earned a tour card for the 2022 season by winning the 2021 PDC UK Challenge Tour, which also earned him a place in both the 2021 Grand Slam of Darts, and the 2022 PDC World Darts Championship. He was beaten by Joe Cullen in the last 64 at the World Championship. He won his first senior PDC title at 2022's Players Championship 6, defeating Ricky Evans 8–6 in the final. Williams earned £12,000 in ranking money with his title win. At the 2023 PDC World Darts Championship, Williams reached the third round but was narrowly defeated by Gabriel Clemens in a seven-set thriller.

At the 2024 PDC World Championship, he knocked out Peter Wright with a 3–0 victory in the second round, before being knocked out by Raymond van Barneveld 4–1. Williams got the late call-up and played alongside Jonny Clayton for Wales at the 2024 PDC World Cup of Darts after Gerwyn Price was ruled out due to health issues. They were defeated in the second round by Croatia 8–6.

== World Championship performances ==
=== BDO ===
- 2014: First round (lost to Dave Prins 0–3) (sets)
- 2016: Second round (lost to Wesley Harms 3–4)
- 2017: Second round (lost to Jamie Hughes 1–4)
- 2018: Quarter-finals (lost to Glen Durrant 4–5)
- 2019: Semi-finals (lost to Glen Durrant 3–6)
- 2020: Runner-up (lost to Wayne Warren 4–7)

=== PDC ===
- 2022: Second round (lost to Joe Cullen 2–3)
- 2023: Third round (lost to Gabriel Clemens 3–4)
- 2024: Third round (lost to Raymond van Barneveld 1–4)
- 2025: First round (lost to Paolo Nebrida 2–3)

== Career finals ==
=== BDO major finals: 3 (1 title) ===
Legend
World Championship (0–1)
Zuiderduin Masters (0–1)
BDO World Trophy (1–0)

Outcome	No.	Year	Championship	Opponent in the final	Score (Note: (l) = score in legs, (s) = score in sets.)
Runner-up	1.	2017	Zuiderduin Masters	(Netherlands) Danny Noppert	3–5 (s)
Winner	1.	2019	BDO World Trophy	(Netherlands) Richard Veenstra	8–6 (l)
Runner-up	2.	2020	World Darts Championship	(Wales) Wayne Warren	4–7 (s)

== Performance timeline ==
=== BDO ===
Tournament	2012	2013	2014	2015	2016	2017	2018	2019	2020
BDO World Championship	DNQ		1R	DNQ	2R	2R	QF	SF	F
BDO World Trophy	NH		2R	DNQ	1R	1R	SF	W	NH
World Masters	QF	3R	2R	5R	6R	QF	SF	2R	NH
Finder Darts Masters	DNP			SF	RR	F	SF	NH	

=== PDC ===
Tournament	2018	2019	2020	2021	2022	2023	2024	2025	2026
PDC World Championship	BDO			DNP	2R	3R	3R	1R	DNQ
UK Open	DNQ				4R	4R	3R	3R	DNQ
Grand Slam of Darts	RR	RR	DNQ	RR	DNQ				
Players Championship Finals	DNQ				1R	1R	1R	DNQ	
Non-ranked televised events
PDC World Cup of Darts	Did not qualify						2R	DNQ	
Career statistics
Season-end ranking	–	–	160	93	59	40	51		

==== European Tour ====
Season	1	2	3	4	5	6	7	8	9	10	11	12	13
2022	IDO; DNP	GDC; DNQ	GDG; 1R	ADO; 2R	DNQ		EDG; 1R	DDC; WD	EDM; DNQ	HDT; 3R	GDO; 2R	BDO; DNQ	GDT; 1R
2023	BSD; DNQ	EDO; 2R	IDO; DNQ	GDG; 3R	ADO; WD	DDC; 2R	Did not qualify						
2024	Did not qualify										HDT; 2R	SDT; 1R	CDO; DNQ

==== Players Championships ====
Season	1	2	3	4	5	6	7	8	9	10	11	12	13	14	15	16	17	18	19	20	21	22	23	24	25	26	27	28	29	30	31	32	33	34
2020 (Note: Not a Tour card holder)	Did not participate																		COV; 4R	COV; 1R	COV; 3R	COV; 1R	COV; 1R											
2022	BAR; 3R	BAR; 1R	WIG; 2R	WIG; 1R	BAR; 3R	BAR; W	NIE; DNP		BAR; 1R	BAR; 2R	BAR; 2R	BAR; 1R	BAR; 3R	WIG; 1R	WIG; 2R	NIE; 3R	NIE; 4R	BAR; 1R	BAR; 1R	BAR; 2R	BAR; 2R	BAR; 1R	BAR; 3R	BAR; 1R	BAR; 3R	BAR; 1R	BAR; 1R	BAR; 4R	BAR; 2R	BAR; 1R				
2023	BAR; 2R	BAR; 3R	BAR; 3R	BAR; QF	BAR; 2R	BAR; 1R	HIL; 3R	HIL; 1R	WIG; 1R	WIG; 3R	LEI; 1R	DNP			LEI; 1R	LEI; 3R	HIL; DNP		BAR; 2R	BAR; 2R	BAR; 1R	BAR; 3R	BAR; 2R	BAR; 3R	BAR; SF	BAR; 3R	BAR; 1R	BAR; 3R	BAR; 1R	BAR; F				
2024	WIG; 1R	WIG; 1R	LEI; 3R	LEI; 4R	HIL; DNP		LEI; 3R	LEI; 2R	HIL; 1R	HIL; 3R	HIL; 1R	HIL; 3R	MIL; 3R	MIL; 1R	MIL; 2R	MIL; 1R	MIL; 4R	MIL; QF	MIL; 1R	WIG; 2R	WIG; 3R	LEI; 2R	LEI; 1R	WIG; DNP			WIG; 2R	WIG; 2R	LEI; 2R	LEI; 3R				
2025	DNP				LEI; 1R	LEI; 1R	HIL; DNP		LEI; 1R	LEI; 3R	LEI; 2R	LEI; 1R	ROS; 1R	ROS; 1R	HIL; 3R	HIL; 1R	LEI; 1R	LEI; 1R	LEI; 1R	LEI; 1R	LEI; 1R	HIL; 1R	HIL; 1R	MIL; 1R	MIL; 1R	HIL; 2R	HIL; 1R	LEI; 3R	LEI; 1R	LEI; 1R	WIG; DNP		WIG; 1R	WIG; 1R

Performance Table Legend
W	Won the tournament	F	Finalist	SF	Semifinalist	QF	Quarterfinalist	#R; RR; Prel.	Lost in # round Round-robin; Preliminary round	DQ	Disqualified
DNQ	Did not qualify	DNP	Did not participate	WD	Withdrew	NH	Tournament not held	#R; RR; Prel.	Lost in # round Round-robin; Preliminary round	NYF	Not yet founded
