= 2018 BDO World Trophy =

BDO World Trophy

Tournament information
- Dates: 30 May - 3 June 2018
- Venue: Preston Guild Hall
- Location: Preston
- Country: England
- Organisation(s): BDO
- Format: Legs; Finals: best of 19 (men's) best of 11 (women's)
- Prize fund: £34,000
- Winner's share: £8,000
- High checkout: Men: 170 (Scotland) Ryan Hogarth (first round) Women: 124 (England) Fallon Sherrock (final)

Champion(s)
- (England) Glen Durrant (men) (England) Fallon Sherrock (women)

The 2018 BDO World Trophy was a major darts tournament run by the British Darts Organisation. It was host between 30 May and 3 June 2018 at Preston Guild Hall, Preston, England.

Peter Machin and Aileen de Graaf were defending their champions, after beating Martin Phillips (10–8) and Anastasia Dobromyslova (6–2) respectively in the final of last year's edition.

Machin lost to Michael Unterbuchner 7–1 in the Quarter-finals. De Graaf lost in the First round 4–3 to Maria O'Brien.

Unterbuchner went on to lose in the final of the men’s event to Glen Durrant (10–7), who has now completed the ‘triple crown’ of BDO majors. In the women’s competition, Fallon Sherrock won her second televised title with a 6–3 win over Lorraine Winstanley.

== Men ==
=== Qualifiers ===
Top 16 in BDO Rankings

1. (England) Glen Durrant (winner)
2. (England) Mark McGeeney (second round)
3. (England) Scott Mitchell (second round)
4. (Wales) Jim Williams (semi-finals)
5. (England) Scott Waites (first round)
6. (Scotland) Ross Montgomery (semi-finals)
7. (Netherlands) Wesley Harms (second round)
8. (Netherlands) Willem Mandigers (first round)
9. (Wales) Martin Phillips (first round)
10. (England) James Hurrell (first round)
11. (England) Gary Robson (first round)
12. (Belgium) Andy Baetens (second round)
13. (England) Conan Whitehead (first round)
14. (Northern Ireland) Kyle McKinstry (quarter-finals)
15. (Wales) Dean Reynolds (first round)
16. (Netherlands) Jeffrey Sparidaans (first round)

17–25 in BDO Rankings

17. (England) Scott Baker (quarter-finals)
18. (Wales) Wayne Warren (first round)
19. (Netherlands) Chris Landman (first round)
20. (Germany) Michael Unterbuchner (runner-up)
21. (Lithuania) Darius Labanauskas (quarter-finals)
22. (England) Tony O'Shea (second round)
23. (Netherlands) Derk Telnekes (first round)
24. (England) Daniel Day (first round)
25. (Wales) Richie Edwards (second round)

WDF regional Qualifiers

- (Brunei) Pengiran Mohamed (first round)
- (Australia) Justin Thompson (first round)

Play-Offs Qualifiers

- (Scotland) William Borland (second round)
- (Wales) Dafydd Edwards (first round)
- (Scotland) Ryan Hogarth (second round)
- (Wales) Jonathan Worsley (first round)

Last Year Winner not Qualified

- (Australia) Peter Machin (quarter-finals)

=== Draw bracket ===
First Round (best of 11 legs); 30 May - 1 June
1	(England) Glen Durrant 98.56	6
Q	(Wales) Dafydd Edwards 87.76	2
16	(Netherlands) Jeffrey Sparidaans 77.68	1
(England) Tony O'Shea 86.67	6
8	(Netherlands) Willem Mandigers 80.43	3
(Wales) Richie Edwards 84.57	6
9	(Wales) Martin Phillips 81.69	2
(Lithuania) Darius Labanauskas 86.79	6
5	(England) Scott Waites 95.47	5
(England) Scott Baker 95.34	6
12	(Belgium) Andy Baetens 82.20	6
Q	(Australia) Justin Thompson 84.90	4
4	(Wales) Jim Williams 90.13	6
(Netherlands) Derk Telnekes 87.32	3
13	(England) Conan Whitehead 82.22	1
Q	(Scotland) William Borland 91.87	6
2	(England) Mark McGeeney 98.36	6
(Netherlands) Chris Landman 89.73	4
15	(Wales) Dean Reynolds 71.28	1
(Germany) Michael Unterbuchner 84.74	6
7	(Netherlands) Wesley Harms 96.37	6
(Wales) Wayne Warren 90.38	3
10	(England) James Hurrell 80.96	3
WC	(Australia) Peter Machin 89.17	6
6	(Scotland) Ross Montgomery 94.28	6
(England) Daniel Day 90.07	3
11	(England) Gary Robson 90.88	3
Q	(Scotland) Ryan Hogarth 89.29	6
3	(England) Scott Mitchell 96.52	6
Q	(Brunei) Pengiran Mohamed 77.82	2
14	(Northern Ireland) Kyle McKinstry 99.18	6
Q	(Wales) Jonathan Worsley 86.54	3

Second Round (best of 11 legs); 2 June
1	(England) Glen Durrant 102.90	6
(England) Tony O'Shea 80.82	1
(Wales) Richie Edwards 80.64	4
(Lithuania) Darius Labanauskas 83.49	6
(England) Scott Baker 85.82	6
12	(Belgium) Andy Baetens 88.53	4
4	(Wales) Jim Williams 89.46	6
Q	(Scotland) William Borland 88.00	2
2	(England) Mark McGeeney 92.31	5
(Germany) Michael Unterbuchner 95.62	6
7	(Netherlands) Wesley Harms 92.58	5
WC	(Australia) Peter Machin 90.36	6
6	(Scotland) Ross Montgomery 102.24	6
Q	(Scotland) Ryan Hogarth 92.34	2
3	(England) Scott Mitchell 85.65	3
14	(Northern Ireland) Kyle McKinstry 92.01	6

Quarter-finals (best of 13 legs); 3 June
1	(England) Glen Durrant 100.26	7
(Lithuania) Darius Labanauskas 95.88	5
(England) Scott Baker 96.33	3
4	(Wales) Jim Williams 95.37	7
(Germany) Michael Unterbuchner 96.63	7
WC	(Australia) Peter Machin 91.86	1
6	(Scotland) Ross Montgomery 89.34	7
14	(Northern Ireland) Kyle McKinstry 82.65	6

Semi-finals (best of 15 legs); 3 June
1	(England) Glen Durrant 98.62	8
4	(Wales) Jim Williams 95.79	6
(Germany) Michael Unterbuchner 94.12	8
6	(Scotland) Ross Montgomery 88.75	6

Final (best of 19 legs); 3 June
1	(England) Glen Durrant 97.00	10
(Germany) Michael Unterbuchner 95.67	7

== Women ==
=== Qualifiers ===
Top 8 in BDO Rankings
1. (England) Lorraine Winstanley (runner-up)
2. (Netherlands) Aileen de Graaf (first round)
3. (England) Deta Hedman (first round)
4. (England) Lisa Ashton (quarter-finals)
5. (Russia) Anastasia Dobromyslova (semi-finals)
6. (Netherlands) Sharon Prins (quarter-finals)
7. (England) Fallon Sherrock (winner)
8. (England) Trina Gulliver (first round)

9–14 in BDO Rankings

9. (Australia) Corrine Hammond (first round)
10. (Netherlands) Anca Zijlstra (quarter-finals)
11. (Wales) Rhian Griffiths (first round)
12. (England) Paula Jacklin (first round)
13. (England) Tricia Wright (first round)
14. (England) Maria O'Brien (quarter-finals)

Play-Offs Qualifiers

- (Wales) Rhian O'Sullivan (first round)
- (England) Roz Bulmer (semi-finals)

=== Draw bracket ===
First Round (best of 7 legs); 30 May - 1 June
1	(England) Lorraine Winstanley 76.76	4
(England) Paula Jacklin 62.87	1
8	(England) Trina Gulliver 64.46	3
(Netherlands) Anca Zijlstra 68.45	4
4	(England) Lisa Ashton 79.11	4
(Australia) Corrine Hammond 56.79	0
5	(Russia) Anastasia Dobromyslova 74.22	4
Q	(Wales) Rhian O'Sullivan 64.77	0
2	(Netherlands) Aileen de Graaf 81.64	3
(England) Maria O'Brien 79.06	4
7	(England) Fallon Sherrock 75.78	4
(Wales) Rhian Griffiths 70.41	2
3	(England) Deta Hedman 66.62	3
Q	(England) Roz Bulmer 69.83	4
6	(Netherlands) Sharon Prins 71.32	4
(England) Tricia Wright 70.77	1

Quarter-finals (best of 7 legs); 2 June
1	(England) Lorraine Winstanley 79.11	4
(Netherlands) Anca Zijlstra 70.00	0
4	(England) Lisa Ashton 74.03	2
5	(Russia) Anastasia Dobromyslova 82.17	4
(England) Maria O'Brien 74.50	3
7	(England) Fallon Sherrock 74.96	4
Q	(England) Roz Bulmer 68.31	4
6	(Netherlands) Sharon Prins 61.74	0

Semi-finals (best of 9 legs); 3 June
1	(England) Lorraine Winstanley 74.47	5
5	(Russia) Anastasia Dobromyslova 81.04	4
7	(England) Fallon Sherrock 91.65	5
Q	(England) Roz Bulmer 76.85	0

Final (best of 11 legs); 3 June
1	(England) Lorraine Winstanley 84.77	3
7	(England) Fallon Sherrock 94.22	6
