= Paula Jacklin =

English darts player

Personal information
- Nickname: Kickass
- Born: 24 March 1957 (age 69) England
- Home town: Gainsborough, Lincolnshire, England

Sport
- Sport: Darts
- Darts: Custom Darts
- Laterality: Right-handed
- Walk-on music: "Turn Down for What" by DJ Snake

Organisation (see split in darts)
- BDO: 2012–2020
- WDF: 2012–
- Current world ranking: (WDF W) 12 (17 August 2026)

WDF major events – best performances
- World Championship: Last 16: 2015, 2016, 2018, 2019, 2020
- World Masters: Last 20: 2016
- World Trophy: Last 16: 2014, 2015, 2016, 2017, 2018, 2019
- Dutch Open: Semi-final: 2026

Other tournament wins
- Years
Gibraltar Open	2014, 2019
Northern Ireland Open	2014
Torremolinos Open	2016, 2018, 2019
Acropolis Darts Open	2019
Greek Open	2019
Malta Open	2021
Torremolinos Classic	2022
Helvetia Open	2024
Slovak Masters	2025
Catalonia Open	2026
FCD Anniversary Open	2026

Paula Jacklin (24 March 1957) is an English darts player who competes in World Darts Federation (WDF) events.

== World Championship results ==
=== BDO/WDF ===
- 2015: First round (lost to Aileen de Graaf 0–2)
- 2016: First round (lost to Lisa Ashton 0–2)
- 2018: First round (lost to Aileen de Graaf 0–2)
- 2019: First round (lost to Aileen de Graaf 0–2)
- 2020: First round (lost to Lisa Ashton 0–2)
- 2022: First round (lost to Rhian O'Sullivan 0–2)
- 2023: First round (lost to Aletta Wajer 0–2)
- 2024: First round (lost to Paula Murphy 0–2)
- 2025: First round (lost to Eve Henley-Spread 0–2)
