= David Evans (darts player) =

English darts player (born 1989)

Personal information
- Nickname: "Stretch"
- Born: 9 November 1989 (age 36) Preston, Lancashire, England
- Home town: Ribbleton, England

Sport
- Sport: Darts
- Playing since: 2000
- Darts: 23g Unicorn Signature
- Laterality: Right-handed
- Walk-on music: "The Business" by Tiësto

Organisation (see split in darts)
- BDO: 2013–2014, 2019–2020
- PDC: 2013, 2016–
- WDF: 2019–2020

WDF major events – best performances
- World Championship: Quarter-final: 2020

PDC premier events – best performances
- World Championship: Last 96: 2021
- UK Open: Last 64: 2018, 2021

Other tournament wins
- Years
PDC Challenge Tour	2018, 2020 (x3)
MODUS Super Series Weekly Winner	2025 x 2

David Evans (born 9 November 1989) is an English professional darts player who competes in Professional Darts Corporation events. He previously participated in British Darts Organisation (BDO) tournaments; he reached a peak ranking of BDO world number two. He previously held a PDC tour card for two years, losing it at the end of 2022. Evans has won four Challenge Tour Titles and topped the Challenge Tour Order of Merit in 2020.

Evans played in the PDC until December 2022 after obtaining his Tour Card through topping the Challenge Tour Order of Merit in 2020. He now plays on the PDC Challenge Tour across Germany and the UK and ADC events across the UK. He has also featured in the Modus Super Series recently, winning Series 10 Week 11 in 2025.

He is a six-time participant in the UK Open, and has played in two European Tour in Sindelfingen and Jena, averaging over 100 on his debut.

== Career ==
In September 2019, Evans qualified for the 2020 BDO World Darts Championship as the 14th seed, where he got to the quarter-finals on debut. He also had a successful spell in his younger days whilst playing cricket, opening the bowling for Stacksteads Cricket Club in the Ribblesdale Cricket league.

== World Championship results ==
=== BDO ===
- 2020: Quarter-finals (lost to Mario Vandenbogaerde 3–5) (sets)

=== PDC ===
- 2021: First round (lost to Ross Smith 0–3)

== Performance timeline ==
=== PDC Players Championships ===
Season	1	2	3	4	5	6	7	8	9	10	11	12	13	14	15	16	17	18	19	20	21	22	23	24	25	26	27	28	29	30
2019 (Note: Not a Tour card holder)	Did not participate																										DUB; 1R	DUB; 3R	BAR; 1R	BAR; 2R
2020	Did not participate																		COV; 1R	COV; 1R	COV; 2R	COV; 2R	COV; 3R							
2021	BOL; 1R	BOL; 1R	BOL; 1R	BOL; 1R	MIL; 2R	MIL; 1R	MIL; 1R	MIL; 1R	NIE; 1R	NIE; 1R	NIE; 1R	NIE; 1R	MIL; 1R	MIL; 2R	MIL; 1R	MIL; 1R	COV; 2R	COV; 1R	COV; 1R	COV; 2R	BAR; 2R	BAR; 2R	BAR; 1R	BAR; 1R	BAR; 1R	BAR; 1R	BAR; 2R	BAR; 1R	BAR; 1R	BAR; 2R
2022	BAR; 1R	BAR; 1R	WIG; 1R	WIG; 1R	BAR; 1R	BAR; 1R	NIE; 2R	NIE; 1R	BAR; 1R	BAR; 2R	BAR; 1R	BAR; 1R	BAR; 1R	WIG; 1R	WIG; 1R	NIE; 1R	NIE; 1R	BAR; 1R	BAR; 1R	BAR; 1R	BAR; 1R	BAR; 1R	BAR; 2R	BAR; 2R	BAR; 1R	BAR; 1R	BAR; 1R	BAR; 1R	BAR; 2R	BAR; 1R
2023	Did not participate																							BAR; 1R	BAR; DNP			BAR; 1R	BAR; DNP	
2024	Did not participate																									WIG; 1R	WIG; 1R	WIG; 1R	LEI; DNP	
