= 2020 BDO World Darts Championship =

Tournament information
- Dates: 4–12 January 2020
- Venue: Indigo at The O2
- Location: London, England
- Organisation(s): British Darts Organisation (BDO)
- Format: Sets
- Prize fund: £127,000 (men) £26,500 (women)
- Winner's share: £23,000 (men) £10,000 (women)
- High checkout: 170; Martijn Kleermaker (x2); Chris Landman; Willem Mandigers

Champion(s)
- Wayne Warren (WAL) (men); Mikuru Suzuki (JPN) (women); Keane Barry (IRL) (youth)

The 2020 BDO World Professional Darts Championship was the 43rd and final World Championship organised by the British Darts Organisation, and the only staging at the Indigo at The O2 in London. It was the first BDO World Darts Championship not held at the Lakeside Country Club since 1985. Gabriel Pascaru and Thibault Tricole became the first players from Romania and France respectively to play in a World Darts Championship. Three-time men's defending champion Glen Durrant was absent from the event, having switched to the Professional Darts Corporation in January 2019. The reigning women's champion was Mikuru Suzuki. She successfully retained her title, by defeating Lisa Ashton 3–0 in the final. Wayne Warren won his first world title with a 7–4 win over fellow Welshman Jim Williams in the final. He became the oldest player ever to win a world title.

It was the final World Darts Championship organised by the BDO due to the collapse of the organisation in September 2020. Following the tournament, the World Darts Federation announced plans to launch the WDF World Championship in 2020, but due to the COVID-19 pandemic these plans were pushed back to 2022.

== Prize money ==
On 30 December 2019, less than a week before the tournament was due to start, it was announced that due to ticket sales of only 15%, the prize money would be 'reduced somewhat'. A reduction from £359,000 to £150,000 was reported in the media but prize money aside from the winners was unconfirmed. It was thought that the prize money would be reduced by half in most cases, although this was unconfirmed. On 15 January 2020, the prize fund was finally revealed with the men's champion portion dropping from £100,000 last year to only £23,000 this year. On 11 February 2020, it was reported that players had still not received any prize money, despite payment being due by 9 February, 28 days after the tournament ended.

Men's

Position (number of players)		Prize money
Winner	(1)	£23,000
Runner-up	(1)	£10,000
Semi-finalist	(2)	£5,000
Quarter-finalist	(4)	£4,000
Second round losers	(8)	£3,000
First round losers	(16)	£2,000
Preliminary round losers	(8)	£1,500
Total	£127,000	

Women's

Position (number of players)		Prize money
Winner	(1)	£10,000
Runner-up	(1)	£4,500
Semi-finalist	(2)	£2,000
Quarter-finalist	(4)	£1,000
First round losers	(8)	£500
Total	£26,500	

== Men's ==
=== Format and qualifiers ===
1–16 in BDO rankings
Seeded in First round

1. (Netherlands) Wesley Harms (second round)
2. (Wales) Jim Williams (runner-up)
3. (Netherlands) Richard Veenstra (second round)
4. (England) Dave Parletti (first round)
5. (Wales) Wayne Warren (winner)
6. (Wales) Nick Kenny (first round)
7. (Netherlands) Martijn Kleermaker (second round)
8. (Netherlands) Willem Mandigers (first round)
9. (England) Scott Mitchell (semi-finals)
10. (England) Adam Smith-Neale (first round)
11. (Belgium) Mario Vandenbogaerde (semi-finals)
12. (England) Andy Hamilton (second round)
13. (England) Gary Robson (first round)
14. (England) David Evans (quarter-finals)
15. (Scotland) Ryan Hogarth (second round)
16. (England) Scott Waites (quarter-finals)

17–24 in BDO rankings
First round

17. (Scotland) Gary Stone (first round)
18. (England) Leighton Bennett (first round)
19. (Netherlands) Chris Landman (quarter-finals)
20. (Germany) Michael Unterbuchner (second round)
21. (Netherlands) Dennie Olde Kalter (second round)
22. (Netherlands) Gino Vos (first round)
23. (England) Martin Adams (first round)
24. (Poland) Sebastian Steyer (first round)

25–27 in BDO rankings
Preliminary round

25. (England) Simon Stainton (preliminary round)
26. (Belgium) Brian Raman (preliminary round)
27. (Scotland) Ross Montgomery (preliminary round)

World Master
Preliminary round

28. (Republic of Ireland) John O'Shea (preliminary round)

Regional Table qualifiers
Preliminary round

- (Australia) Justin Thompson (first round)
- (Sweden) Andreas Harrysson (first round)
- (England) Paul Hogan (quarter-finals)
- (Canada) David Cameron (preliminary round)
- (Romania) Gabriel Pascaru (preliminary round)
- (New Zealand) Darren Herewini (first round)
- (United States) Joe Chaney (preliminary round)
- (France) Thibault Tricole (first round)

Playoff qualifiers
Preliminary round

- (England) Nick Fullwell (first round)
- (England) Justin Hood (first round)
- (England) Scott Williams (preliminary round)
- (England) Ben Hazel (second round)

== Draw bracket ==
=== Preliminary round ===
All matches are the first to 3 sets

Av.	Player	Score	Player	Av.
83.78	(Q) Justin Thompson (Australia)	3 – 0	(England) Scott Williams (Q)	82.41
87.30	(Q) Darren Herewini (New Zealand)	3 – 1	(England) Simon Stainton	86.22
86.19	(Q) Thibault Tricole (France)	3 – 2	(Scotland) Ross Montgomery	93.08
86.27	(Q) Joe Chaney (United States)	2 – 3	(England) Ben Hazel (Q)	86.22
80.98	(Q) Andreas Harrysson (Sweden)	3 – 2	(Republic of Ireland) John O'Shea (WC)	75.38
88.51	(Q) Paul Hogan (England)	3 – 1	(Belgium) Brian Raman	89.22
81.90	(Q) Gabriel Pascaru (Romania)	1 – 3	(England) Justin Hood (Q)	90.24
86.71	(Q) David Cameron (Canada)	1 – 3	(England) Nick Fullwell (Q)	90.44

=== Last 32 ===
First round (best of 5 sets)
1	(Netherlands) Wesley Harms 91.79	3
Q	(Sweden) Andreas Harrysson 88.22	2
16	(England) Scott Waites 84.20	3
(England) Martin Adams 85.62	2
8	(Netherlands) Willem Mandigers 94.16	1
(Germany) Michael Unterbuchner 89.71	3
9	(England) Scott Mitchell 84.96	3
(England) Leighton Bennett 77.58	1
5	(Wales) Wayne Warren 92.75	3
Q	(Australia) Justin Thompson 91.11	2
12	(England) Andy Hamilton 82.59	3
Q	(New Zealand) Darren Herewini 79.53	1
4	(England) Dave Parletti 83.69	2
(Netherlands) Chris Landman 84.17	3
13	(England) Gary Robson 79.47	2
Q	(England) Ben Hazel 80.30	3
2	(Wales) Jim Williams 85.52	3
(Scotland) Gary Stone 85.12	2
15	(Scotland) Ryan Hogarth 80.36	3
Q	(France) Thibault Tricole 82.21	1
7	(Netherlands) Martijn Kleermaker 93.27	3
(Netherlands) Gino Vos 82.15	0
10	(England) Adam Smith-Neale 83.21	0
Q	(England) Paul Hogan 97.51	3
6	(Wales) Nick Kenny 89.02	2
(Netherlands) Dennie Olde Kalter 88.15	3
11	(Belgium) Mario Vandenbogaerde 88.98	3
(Poland) Sebastian Steyer 83.10	0
3	(Netherlands) Richard Veenstra 86.31	3
Q	(England) Justin Hood 90.22	1
14	(England) David Evans 83.65	3
Q	(England) Nick Fullwell 88.26	2

Second round (best of 7 sets)
1	(Netherlands) Wesley Harms 90.67	2
16	(England) Scott Waites 88.98	4
(Germany) Michael Unterbuchner 91.99	0
9	(England) Scott Mitchell 92.58	4
5	(Wales) Wayne Warren 92.69	4
12	(England) Andy Hamilton 95.58	1
(Netherlands) Chris Landman 87.18	4
Q	(England) Ben Hazel 83.93	3
2	(Wales) Jim Williams 94.36	4
15	(Scotland) Ryan Hogarth 86.91	0
7	(Netherlands) Martijn Kleermaker 92.58	1
Q	(England) Paul Hogan 99.69	4
(Netherlands) Dennie Olde Kalter 84.90	1
11	(Belgium) Mario Vandenbogaerde 90.63	4
3	(Netherlands) Richard Veenstra 94.11	2
14	(England) David Evans 95.65	4

Quarter-finals (best of 9 sets)
16	(England) Scott Waites 93.85	4
9	(England) Scott Mitchell 92.53	5
5	(Wales) Wayne Warren 90.81	5
(Netherlands) Chris Landman 85.04	3
2	(Wales) Jim Williams 86.81	5
Q	(England) Paul Hogan 82.14	1
11	(Belgium) Mario Vandenbogaerde 89.50	5
14	(England) David Evans 89.39	3

Semi-finals (best of 11 sets)
9	(England) Scott Mitchell 93.81	3
5	(Wales) Wayne Warren 93.32	6
2	(Wales) Jim Williams 90.98	6
11	(Belgium) Mario Vandenbogaerde 86.49	4

Final (best of 13 sets)
5	(Wales) Wayne Warren 93.72	7
2	(Wales) Jim Williams 94.53	4

== Women's ==
=== Format and qualifiers ===
1–8 in BDO rankings
Seeded in first round

1. (England) Lisa Ashton (Runner up)
2. (Japan) Mikuru Suzuki (winner)
3. (Netherlands) Aileen de Graaf (quarter-finals)
4. ~~(England) Fallon Sherrock~~ (Note: Fallon Sherrock withdrew from the tournament following the BDO announcement that prize money for the event had been cut. She was replaced in the draw by the next highest ranked player not qualified, which was Vicky Pruim)
5. (England) Deta Hedman (first round)
6. (England) Beau Greaves (semi-finals)
7. (Russia) Anastasia Dobromyslova (quarter-finals)
8. (England) Lorraine Winstanley (quarter-finals)

9–16 in BDO rankings
First round

9. (England) Laura Turner (quarter-finals)
10. (England) Maria O'Brien (first round)
11. (England) Casey Gallagher (first round)
12. (England) Paula Jacklin (first round)
13. (Netherlands) Sharon Prins (first round)
14. ~~(England) Trina Gulliver~~ (Note: Trina Gulliver withdrew from the tournament due to ill health. She was replaced in the draw by the next highest ranked player not qualified, which was Tori Kewish)
15. (Australia) Tori Kewish (first round)
16. (Sweden) Vicky Pruim (first round)

Playoff qualifiers
First round

- (Australia) Corrine Hammond (semi-finals)
- (England) Kirsty Hutchinson (first round)

=== Draw ===
First round (best of 3 sets)
1	(England) Lisa Ashton 79.81	3	3
(England) Paula Jacklin 63.50	0	0
8	(England) Lorraine Winstanley 73.17	3	3
(England) Casey Gallagher 73.84	0	2
Alt	(Sweden) Vicky Pruim 71.18	2	1
Q	(Australia) Corrine Hammond 69.35	3	3
5	(England) Deta Hedman 64.15	1	2
(England) Laura Turner 64.57	3	3
2	(Japan) Mikuru Suzuki 84.92	0	3	3
(England) Maria O'Brien 80.69	3	0	1
7	(Russia) Anastasia Dobromyslova 64.51	3	3
(Netherlands) Sharon Prins 62.35	1	2
3	(Netherlands) Aileen de Graaf 72.99	1	3	3
Q	(England) Kirsty Hutchinson 70.15	3	0	2
6	(England) Beau Greaves 80.37	3	3
Alt	(Australia) Tori Kewish 75.63	0	1

Quarter-finals (best of 3 sets)
1	(England) Lisa Ashton 79.90	3	3
8	(England) Lorraine Winstanley 78.45	2	2
Q	(Australia) Corrine Hammond 67.75	3	3
(England) Laura Turner 61.82	1	1
2	(Japan) Mikuru Suzuki 77.87	3	3
7	(Russia) Anastasia Dobromyslova 77.56	2	2
3	(Netherlands) Aileen de Graaf 81.59	0	3	0
6	(England) Beau Greaves 86.28	3	2	3

Semi-finals (best of 3 sets)
1	(England) Lisa Ashton 84.28	3	3
Q	(Australia) Corrine Hammond 77.08	0	0
2	(Japan) Mikuru Suzuki 79.14	3	0	3
6	(England) Beau Greaves 76.24	2	3	0

Final (best of 5 sets)
1	(England) Lisa Ashton 85.00	1	2	2
2	(Japan) Mikuru Suzuki 83.39	3	3	3

== Youth ==
Av.	Player	Score	Player	Av.
84.24	Leighton Bennett (England)	0 – 3	(Republic of Ireland) Keane Barry	90.54
