= Kyle McKinstry =

Northern Irish darts player

Personal information
- Nickname: "The Village Man"
- Born: 26 August 1986 (age 40) Tandragee, Northern Ireland
- Home town: Moygashel, Northern Ireland

Sport
- Sport: Darts
- Playing since: 2004
- Darts: 24 Gram
- Laterality: Right-handed
- Walk-on music: "Penny Arcade" by Roy Orbison

Organisation (see split in darts)
- BDO: 2014–2019
- PDC: 2020

WDF major events – best performances
- World Championship: Quarter Finals: 2019
- World Masters: Last 32: 2015
- World Trophy: Quarter Finals: 2018
- Finder Masters: Last 24 Group: 2017

PDC premier events – best performances
- UK Open: Last 16: 2020

Other tournament wins
- Years
England Open	2018
Hal Masters	2017
Northern Ireland Open	2017, 2019
PDC Challenge Tour	2019

Kyle McKinstry (born 26 August 1986) is a Northern Irish professional darts player who is currently serving an eight-year ban from the sport after admitting to match fixing in 2020.

== Career ==
In 2017, McKinstry won the Hal Masters and the Northern Ireland Open. He qualified for the 2018 BDO World Darts Championship as number 17 in the BDO rankings, but he lost 3–2 to Richard Veenstra in the first round. The following year, he qualified for the tournament once again, and has beaten Chris Landman 3–2 in the first round, David Cameron 4–3 in the second round and losing to Glen Durrant 5–2 in the Quarter Finals.

In 2020, McKinstry debut of the 2020 UK Open has beaten Fallon Sherrock in the first round, Jason Heaver in the second round, Stephen Burton in the third round, Bradley Brooks in the fourth round, Martin Schindler in the fifth round and losing to Dimitri Van den Bergh 10–8 in the Sixth Round. In August 2020, McKinstry and Wessel Nijman were suspended for match-fixing during Modus Live League games. McKinstry was eventually served with an eight-year ban from the sport following the DRA inquiry.

== World Championship results ==
=== BDO ===
- 2018: 1st round (lost to Richard Veenstra 2–3)
- 2019: Quarter-finals (lost to Glen Durrant 2–5)

== Performance timeline ==
Tournament	2015	2016	2017	2018	2019	2020
BDO World Championship	DNQ			1R	QF	DNQ
BDO World Trophy	DNQ			QF	1R	NH
Winmau World Masters	L32	L48	L48	DNP		NH
Zuiderduin Masters	DNQ		RR	DNQ	Not held	
UK Open	Did not qualify					6R

Performance Table Legend
DNP	Did not play at the event	DNQ	Did not qualify for the event	NYF	Not yet founded	#R	lost in the early rounds of the tournament (WR = Wildcard round, RR = Round robin)
QF	lost in the quarter-finals	SF	lost in the semi-finals	RU	lost in the final	W	won the tournament
