= Dave Parletti =

English darts player

Personal information
- Nickname: "The Architect"
- Born: 22 April 1983 (age 43) London, England
- Home town: Mortlake, England

Sport
- Sport: Darts
- Playing since: 2003
- Darts: 24g One80 Dave Parletti (The Architect)
- Laterality: Right-handed
- Walk-on music: "Boys Will Be Boys" by The Ordinary Boys

Organisation (see split in darts)
- BDO: 2015–2020
- PDC: 2015, 2021 Q School
- WDF: 2015–

WDF major events – best performances
- World Championship: Last 32: 2019, 2020, 2022
- World Masters: Last 16: 2018
- World Trophy: Last 32: 2019

PDC premier events – best performances
- UK Open: Last 96: 2017
- Grand Slam: Group Stage: 2019

Other tournament wins
- Years
Jersey Classic	2017
Romanian Open	2019
Welsh Classic	2019
Welsh Masters	2018
Winmau Wolverhampton Open	2018

Dave Parletti (born 22 April 1983) is an English professional darts player who plays in events of the World Darts Federation.

== Career ==
In 2017, Parletti won the Jersey Classic. In 2018, he won the Welsh Masters and the Winmau Wolverhampton Open, and also reached the Last 16 of the 2018 World Masters. In 2019, he won the Welsh Classic, after defeating Martin Adams in the final, whilst earlier in the year he picked up the Romanian Open, beating Gary Robson in the final 6-5.

== World Championship results ==
=== BDO/WDF ===
- 2019: First round (lost to Krzysztof Kciuk 1–3)
- 2020: First round (lost to Chris Landman 2–3)
- 2022: Second round (lost to Andy Baetens 1–3)
