= Wayne Warren =

Welsh darts player

Personal information
- Nickname: "Yank"
- Born: 12 June 1962 (age 64) Cardiff, Wales
- Home town: Tynewydd, Wales

Sport
- Sport: Darts
- Playing since: 1985
- Darts: 17.5g Red Dragon Signature
- Laterality: Right Handed
- Walk-on music: "Eye of the Tiger" by Survivor

Organisation (see split in darts)
- BDO: 2003–2020
- WDF: 2003–2022

WDF major events – best performances
- World Championship: Winner (1): 2020
- World Masters: Quarter-final: 2018
- World Trophy: Quarter-final: 2015
- Finder Masters: Quarter-final: 2018

PDC premier events – best performances
- Grand Slam: Group Stage: 2019, 2020

WSDT major events – best performances
- World Championship: Last 16: 2022

Other tournament wins
- Tournament: Years
- Antwerp Open BDO Gold Cup BDO International Open Romanian Classic Slovak Masters WDF Europe Cup Team: 2019; 2014; 2012; 2020; 2020; 2014

Other achievements
- 2014 Glamorgan Open

Wayne Warren (born 12 June 1962) is a Welsh former professional darts player who competed in British Darts Organisation (BDO) and World Darts Federation (WDF) events. He won the 2020 BDO World Darts Championship, becoming the last BDO World Champion. He is the oldest player to become a world champion.

== Darts career ==
=== BDO ===
Warren qualified for the 2005 BDO World Darts Championship, where he was the only Welshman in the field. He lost 3–0 in the first round to third seed Mervyn King. Warren has come close to qualifying for Lakeside on two occasions, falling two games short of qualifying for the 2008 World Championship in a loss to Mike Veitch who eventually qualified, and then falling at the same hurdle again in the qualifiers for the 2009 World Championship, losing to Robbie Green. Warren fell two games short once more of qualifying for the 2010 World Championship, losing to Irishman Martin McCloskey who eventually qualified.

Warren's best TV performance came in the 2015 BDO World Trophy, where he reached the quarter-finals, beating Madars Razma 6–4 and 2015 World Champion Scott Mitchell with ease 7–2. He fell at the Last-8 stage, losing a close game with Jeff Smith 8–7.

Warren also qualified for the 2013 World Championship, but lost in the first round to Alan Norris.

In 2014, Warren won the BDO Gold Cup, beating Pip Blackwell in the final three sets to nil.

Warren reached the quarter-final of the 2018 World Championship, beating Wesley Harms 3–1 in an impressive showing in the 1st round; in the 2nd round, after a tough start, he defeated Willem Mandigers 4–2 to set up a quarter-final match against Mark McGeeney. Warren led McGeeney 4–3 in sets and led the eighth by a break of throw, but McGeeney took the set to a deciding leg, in which Warren hit a double-one attempting to hit a single 20 that would have given him one match dart. McGeeney won the set and ultimately the match 5–4.

At the 2020 World Championship, Warren improved on his best performance by reaching the final, and beat fellow Welshman Jim Williams 7–4 to win the BDO world title. At 57, Warren was the oldest winner of either version of the world championship. His prize winning fee of £23,000 was the lowest awarded to a world champion since 1989, as a result of the BDO's financial difficulties which led to it going into liquidation later in the year. Warren is therefore the last player to win the BDO version of the world championship, and became the World Darts Federation's number one ranked player as a result of his victory.

== Style of play ==
Fellow players and commentators have commented on Warren's smooth and relaxing throwing style.

== Personal life ==
Warren is an active player on the darts exhibition circuit.

Away from darts, Warren works as a roofer and lives in Tynewydd, Rhondda Cynon Taf. He is sponsored by Red Dragon Darts.

In 2001, Warren was involved in an incident in which he was splashed with boiling chip fat – suffering 20% upper body burns which gave him heavy scarring.

== World Championship performances ==
=== BDO ===
- 2005: First round (lost to Mervyn King 0–3)
- 2013: First round (lost to Alan Norris 1–3)
- 2018: Quarter-finals (lost to Mark McGeeney 4–5)
- 2019: Second round (lost to Michael Unterbuchner 0–4)
- 2020: Winner (beat Jim Williams 7–4)

=== WDF ===
- 2022: Third round (lost to Cameron Menzies 0-3)

== Career finals ==
=== BDO major finals: 1 (1 title) ===
Legend
World Championship (1–0)

Outcome	No.	Year	Championship	Opponent in the final	Score (Note: (l) = score in legs, (s) = score in sets.)
Winner	1.	2020	World Darts Championship	(Wales) Jim Williams	7–4 (s)

== Performance timeline ==
BDO

Tournament	2003	2004	2005	2006	2007	2008	2009	2010	2011	2012	2013	2014	2015	2016	2017	2018	2019	2020
BDO World Championship	DNQ		1R	DNQ							1R	DNQ				QF	2R	W
BDO World Trophy	Not held											DNQ	QF	DNQ		1R	2R	NH
Winmau World Masters	1R	DNP	1R	DNP	2R	DNP	1R	3R	4R	2R	4R	2R	1R	1R	1R	QF	DNP	NH
Finder Darts Masters	DNP			NH	DNP											QF	NH	

PDC

Tournament	2019	2020
Grand Slam of Darts	RR	RR

WDF

Tournament	2022
WDF World Championship	3R

Performance Table Legend
W	Won the tournament	F	Finalist	SF	Semifinalist	QF	Quarterfinalist	#R; RR; Prel.	Lost in # round Round-robin; Preliminary round	DQ	Disqualified
DNQ	Did not qualify	DNP	Did not participate	WD	Withdrew	NH	Tournament not held	#R; RR; Prel.	Lost in # round Round-robin; Preliminary round	NYF	Not yet founded
