= British Darts Organisation =

Former governing body of darts in Great Britain

- Abbreviation: BDO
- Formation: 7 January 1973; 53 years ago
- Defunct: September 2020; 6 years ago
- Type: Professional darts organisation
- Headquarters: Tonypandy, Wales, United Kingdom
- Website: bdodarts.com

The British Darts Organisation (BDO) was a darts organisation founded on 7 January 1973 by Olly Croft, and dissolved in 2020 under the stewardship of Des Jacklin. Made up of 66 member counties, it oversaw professional, semi-professional and amateur darts competitions in Britain. The BDO was a founder member of the World Darts Federation in 1974. It also staged a World Professional Darts Championship from 1978 to 2020.

In the early 1990s, a dispute between Croft and the top darts players over the decline in TV coverage and sponsorship led to an acrimonious split in the game, with the players breaking away to form their own governing body which became the Professional Darts Corporation (PDC). Henceforth, the BDO and PDC ran their own separate tours, each with its own world championship.

The BDO suffered an increasing number of problems in its later years. Many of its top players defected to the more lucrative PDC. Irregularities at the 2019 World Masters led to the BDO being demoted to associate member status by the World Darts Federation. Financial issues led to prize money for the 2020 World Championship being greatly reduced. The BDO subsequently went into liquidation in September 2020. Since then, in place of the BDO, the United Kingdom Darts Association (UKDA) is now sanctioning darts in the United Kingdom.

== History ==
The BDO was founded on 7 January 1973 by Olly Croft. It gradually superseded the existing National Darts Association of Great Britain (NDAGB), which had been the de facto governing body of darts in the UK since 1954. The BDO set the rules which govern the game of darts, including setting the distance of the throwing oche (2.37m / 7 ft 9 ¼ inches) and the height and dimensions of the board. The BDO organised the first World Professional Darts Championship in 1978, known for 26 years as The Embassy due to its sponsorship by Imperial Tobacco until 2003. It was then known from 2004 to 2019 as the Lakeside World Professional Darts Championship, or Lakeside for short. In 2019, before the tournament moved to the O2 Arena in 2020, the tournament was derecognised by the World Darts Federation.

== Split in darts ==
After the World Championship began, televised darts became more prevalent with many major tournaments appearing on ITV and BBC. But by 1988, darts had lost many of its sponsors and only the World Championship remained on television. Some players became frustrated by the lack of opportunity to make a living professionally.

A group of 19 players (including all previous world champions who were still active in the game) created the World Darts Council (WDC), later the Professional Darts Corporation (PDC) towards the end of 1990. They wanted more tournaments to be staged and to appoint a PR consultant to improve the image of the game.

The 1993 Embassy World Championship was the last unified world darts championship. On 7 January 1993, the rebel players issued a joint statement affirming that they would only compete in the 1994 tournament if it was held under the auspices of the WDC. The BDO responded by banning the rebel players from all BDO tournaments. After a long legal battle, the BDO was forced to acknowledge the WDC's legitimacy and the right of players to choose which body they competed for. In return the WDC dropped its claim to being the sport's governing body and renamed itself the Professional Darts Corporation.

== After the split ==
Following the split, the BDO and PDC ran their own tours, including their own versions of the world championship, with separate pools of players. Since there were two World Championships from 1994 onwards, there were calls for head-to-head matches between the two champions. There were two head-to-head matches between the reigning champions of the two organisations. The challenge matches, held in 1999 and 2004, were officially recognised as undisputed championship matches. In their respective matches, the incumbent BDO champions Raymond van Barneveld and Andy Fordham were defeated by the PDC champion Phil Taylor.

The BDO board continued to support players from the grassroots of the game since the "split", although there were several high-profile players who made a name within the organisation only to later join the PDC. Raymond van Barneveld's career in the BDO helped boost the popularity of the sport in his home country, the Netherlands. Dutch broadcaster SBS6 has broadcast the World Championship since 1998, and used to show two major BDO tournaments, the International Darts League and World Darts Trophy. (Neither of these any longer exists.) However, the popularity of the sport has possibly contributed to the Netherlands making more star players, including the 2006 BDO World Champion, Jelle Klaasen, and the three-time PDC World Champion, Michael van Gerwen.

== Exodus of players ==
The rival PDC ran many more televised tournaments and offered greater prize money, allowing top players to make a full-time living from darts. Consequently, a large number of players who originally played in the BDO "defected" to the PDC. In 2015, one commentator described the BDO as "mostly an unwilling feeder to the PDC: most of its biggest stars... jump ship given the chance."

In 2001, six prominent BDO players, including 1996 champion Steve Beaton and two-time runner-up Ronnie Baxter, announced that they would be competing in the PDC version of the world championship in 2002. Croft insisted the six players would not be missed and suggested that none would have progressed beyond the first round of the tournament. The executive producer of BBC Darts disagreed, stating "You can't just replace recognisable people with unknowns and say it is the same and that nothing has changed." In 2006, in what was described as a "massive coup" for the PDC, four-time BDO champion Raymond van Barneveld moved to the PDC. Van Barneveld said he was switching for the challenge and to "compete against the best players in the world, including the best, Phil Taylor." In January 2007, Dutch trio Jelle Klaasen, Michael van Gerwen and Vincent van der Voort moved to the PDC. They were followed a month later by Mervyn King.

BDO number 1 Robert Thornton decided to move to the PDC in May 2008. Gary Anderson and Mark Webster were the BDO's two top ranked players when they signed with the PDC in January 2009. 2008 Lakeside runner-up Simon Whitlock also signed with the PDC in 2009. Weeks after winning the Lakeside title in January 2014, Stephen Bunting became the first reigning BDO champion to join the PDC. Three-time defending champion Glen Durrant followed suit in 2019 after winning a PDC tour card at Q School, declaring it "as good as winning the championship at Lakeside." John Part (1997), Richie Burnett (2000), Ted Hankey (2012), Les Wallace (2013), Christian Kist (2014), and Scott Waites (2020) are the other past BDO champions who subsequently switched to the PDC.

By contrast, very few players moved from the PDC to the BDO. 2004 Lakeside champion Andy Fordham moved to the PDC in 2009 and returned to the BDO in 2013. Three time BDO women's champion Anastasia Dobromyslova switched to the PDC in 2008, before returning in 2011. Ted Hankey, after switching to the PDC in 2012, returned to the BDO in 2014. Andy Hamilton and Wes Newton began playing in BDO events at the start of 2018 after losing their PDC tour cards and both qualified for the 2019 BDO world championship.

== 2011 Annual General Meeting ==
Prior to the 2011 Annual General Meeting of the BDO, many players and officials within the organisation had expressed increasing degrees of dissatisfaction with the performance of the existing Board of Directors. Particular areas of concern were the BDO's apparent stagnation in terms of creating new televised events and gaining new sponsors. An open letter was circulated to the various counties within the BDO structure, setting out the perceived issues, although the said letter was vague as to actual suggestions for improvement. At the subsequent AGM, all but one of the directors were voted out of office (other than Dave Alderman who had already resigned), with only Vic Sexton retaining his seat on the Board.

== Later issues, WDF demotion and liquidation ==
The BDO was dealt a blow in 2016 when the BBC opted not to renew its contract to cover the annual BDO world championship, bringing to an end the 38-year relationship between the BBC and the Lakeside tournament. The BBC instead decided to focus its darts coverage on a new PDC tournament, the Champions League of Darts. The 2017 and 2018 BDO tournaments were broadcast jointly by Channel 4 and BT Sport. From 2019, the tournament was no longer covered by one of the former analogue channels and was shown free-to-air on Quest and on sister pay channel Eurosport.

The 2019 World Masters was beset with problems. Several seeded players opted not to participate in the event in protest at a change to qualifying criteria. Other players who did attend found they were unregistered, having been unaware of a new rule which required them to register in advance online. Due to the confusion, officials announced that there would be a redraw, which included fake names, apparently so they could be substituted if more real players arrived. Players were also not informed of the event's prize money in advance.

Due to the issues at the World Masters, the World Darts Federation subsequently released a statement announcing that the BDO was to be demoted to "associate member" status and the WDF would no longer recognise BDO-organised tournaments. They cited the recent "breach of rules" and "draw changes during their competition", adding "we cannot be a part of or support such activities."

On 30 December 2019, five days before the start of the 2020 BDO World Championship, BDO chairman Des Jacklin announced that the prize money for the upcoming event would have to be "reduced somewhat", although the BDO did not confirm what the new prize fund would be. Jacklin cited the failure to secure a sponsor for the event, and the fact that only 15% of tickets had been sold. The reduction in the prize fund and the failure to confirm the reduced amounts that players would receive was criticised by a number of players. In protest at the reduced prize money on offer, Fallon Sherrock, runner-up in the 2015 women's event, confirmed that she would be withdrawing from the competition. Ultimately, champion Wayne Warren received £23,000, a 77% reduction on the previous year's prize money and the lowest amount received by a winner of the tournament since 1989. In September 2020, the company went into liquidation bringing an end to 47 years of history.

In March 2023, the 38 trophies and plaques belonging to the now defunct British Darts Organisation were put up for auction in order to pay off creditors that were affected by the liquidation of the BDO in 2020.

== Major tournaments ==
BDO Events Ltd was the commercial arm of the BDO (British Darts Organisation) and was set up in 2013. The annual BDO Major events were the following British televised events:

=== World Professional Championship ===
The World Championship was the biggest of the tournaments, held at the Lakeside Country Club, Frimley Green, from 1985 until 2019; for its 43rd and final year it moved to Indigo at The O2. The tournament started in 1978 and for the first 15 years it was a unified World Championship, before a separate competition (the PDC World Championship) began in 1994. There have been 24 different winners of the event; Eric Bristow is the player with the most BDO World titles, including a hat-trick between 1984 and 1986.

In December 2019, the World Darts Federation announced that it would no longer recognise the BDO as the ruling body of darts in the UK and no longer recognised the BDO World Championship. In January 2020, the WDF assumed full responsibility for the running of the event and will be launching the tournament under the WDF banner.

=== World Masters ===
The World Masters began in 1974 and was the longest-running BDO major title. It was the second-biggest major title on the BDO stage. Having been first staged in Fulham, the tournament has been to Wembley, Earls Court, Kensington, the Lakeside Country Club and others. Its last venue was the Circus Tavern in Purfleet.

The tournament featured shorter sets than the World Championship – each set is the best of three legs instead of five at Lakeside. In the 40-year history of the event, only 7 players have managed to win the title on more than one occasion. Eric Bristow holds the record for most tournament wins with five. Bob Anderson and Martin Adams hold the record of winning the title three years running 86, 87, 88 for Anderson and 08, 09, 10 for Adams. Only 14 players have won both the Masters and World titles in their career. In January 2020, the WDF assumed full responsibility for the running of the event and will be launching the tournament under the WDF banner.

=== The BDO World Trophy ===
The BDO World Trophy was the newest "Major" Darts tournament added to the BDO's events calendar from 2014 onwards, organised by BDO Events – the new commercial arm of the British Darts Organisation. BDO Events was part of the first liquidation when the BDO wound up its commercial business; shortly afterward the BDO itself also filed for liquidation, bringing an end to 47 years as the governing body for darts in the UK.

== Former televised tournaments ==
=== Topic International Darts League ===
The Topic International Darts League was a tournament staged in the Netherlands and formed the second leg of the Grand Slam having been introduced in 2003. Whilst its format evolved in later years, it featured players competing in a round-robin tournament. The 2006 event featured 32 players in 8 groups of 4, which were then reduced to 4 further groups of 4. The top two in each group then went through to the knockout stages.

When Raymond van Barneveld switched to the PDC in 2006, the tournament organisers agreed with the BDO to invite four players from the rival organisation. Van Barneveld (PDC) went on to win the title for the third time in 2006 and Gary Anderson (BDO) won the 2007 event. This remains the only major event to date that Phil Taylor hasn't won in either the BDO or PDC.

=== Bullit World Darts Trophy ===
The World Darts Trophy (WDT) was the third BDO major of the year and the second to be held in the Netherlands. Its straight knock-out format is comparable to the two versions of the World Championship.

The WDT followed the International Darts League by inviting four PDC players to the tournament in 2006, and again a PDC player (Phil Taylor) won the title.

=== British Gold Cup ===
The British Gold Cup began in 1978 and was held in Stoke. It was broadcast on the BBC until 1982, with the 1983 tournament blacked out due to a technicians' strike. It was then broadcast in 2008 on Setanta Sports in the UK, after a brief stint on the short-lived channel Wire TV (1994–95).

== Discontinued tournaments ==
=== British Professional Championship ===
The Unipart British Professional Championship was a tournament televised by the BBC between 1981 and 1988. After the 1988 championships, the BBC withdrew their coverage of the event and it left UK terrestrial television with only one televised tournament – the World Championships. The game was at an all-time low and players eventually went on to set up the World Darts Council in an attempt to bring back sponsors and television.

Jocky Wilson won the title a record four times – John Lowe also reached four finals but lost them all.

=== British Matchplay ===
British Matchplay ran from 1976 to 1998. The tournament was broadcast on the ITV network in 1978, but usually broadcast regionally including by host broadcaster Anglia Television. BSB covered the event in 1990.

=== Bullseye Darts Championship ===
Not to be confused with the long-running game show Bullseye, this was a BBC2 tournament which ran for three years during the peak of darts' boom period at the turn of the eighties. Jocky Wilson was twice the winner.

=== Butlins Grand Masters ===
ATV broadcast the Butlins Grand Masters between 1977 and 1988. Matches were played over the best of nine legs. The tournament was held at a pub in Birmingham. Bobby George was twice the winner and Eric Bristow won a hat-trick of titles.

=== World Matchplay ===
The MFI World Matchplay championship was short-lived but historic in darts as it featured the first ever televised nine-dart finish on 13 October 1984 when John Lowe won £102,000 for the perfect game of darts against Keith Deller. Lowe went on to win the title that year. The tournament was broadcast on ITV and originally came from the Fulcrum Centre, Slough before switching to Festival Hall, Basildon. ITV ceased coverage after the 1988 championships and the tournament ended. ITV also pulled coverage of the World Masters after the 1988 event, leaving the BBC as the only broadcaster of darts until 1992.

The PDC introduced a new version of World Matchplay in 1994.

== See also ==
- World Darts Federation
- World Professional Darts Championship
- Darts tournaments – previous winners, history and information.
- Darts players Profiles of players – past and present.
- List of darts players
