= 2016 WDF Europe Cup =

Darts tournament

Tournament information
- Venue: Hotel Zuiderduin
- Location: Egmond aan Zee
- Country: Netherlands
- Established: 20–24 September
- Organisation(s): WDF
- Format: Legs

Champion(s)
- Singles; Richard Veenstra (men's singles); Sharon Prins (women's singles); Pairs; Wesley Harms & Richard Veenstra (men's pairs) (Wales) Rhian Edwards & Rhian Griffiths (women's pairs); Team; England (men's team); England (women's team); Overall; Netherlands (men's overall); England (women's overall)

The 2016 WDF Europe Cup was the 20th edition of the WDF Europe Cup darts tournament, organised by the World Darts Federation. It was held in Egmond aan Zee, Netherlands from September 20 to 24.

== Medal tally ==
* Host nation (Netherlands)

Rank	Nation	Gold	Silver	Bronze	Total
1	Netherlands (NED)*	4	2	0	6
2	England (ENG)	3	4	2	9
3	Wales (WAL)	1	1	1	3
4	Scotland (SCO)	0	1	2	3
5	Germany (GER)	0	0	4	4
6	Sweden (SWE)	0	0	2	2
7	Ireland (IRL)	0	0	1	1
7	Malta (MLT)	0	0	1	1
7	Northern Ireland (NIR)	0	0	1	1
Totals (9 entries)		8	8	14	30

== Entered teams ==
33 countries/associations entered a men's selection in the event. 26 countries/associations entered a women's selection in the event.

Nr.	Country	Men's Selection
1	Belgium	Roger Janssen, Sven Verdonck, Jeffrey Van Egdom, Sven Wens
2	Catalonia	Carles Arola, Josep Arimany, Raul Invernon, Javier Velasco
3	Cyprus	Nikolas Economou, Argyris Soteriou, John Ross, Wayne Halliwell
4	Czech Republic	Michal Ondo, Jakub Milo, Pavel Jirkal, Michal Šmejda
5	Denmark	Mogens Christensen, Lars Helsinghof, Ulrich Meyn, Alex Jensen
6	England	Scott Mitchell, Glen Durrant, Jamie Hughes, James Hurrell
7	Finland	Ulf Ceder, Asko Niskala, Marko Kantele, Tatu Pehkonen
8	France	Cyril Blot, Jacques Labre, Thibault Tricole, Yoann Belchun
9	Germany	Daniel Zygla, Jens Ziegler, Marko Puls, Martin Schindler
10	Gibraltar	Manuel Vilerio, Justin Broton, George Federico, David Francis
11	Greece	Stefanos Samouchos, Gerasimos Krontiris, Ioannis Selachoglou, Michail Vlassis
12	Hungary	Pál Székely, Patrik Kovács, Gábor Takács, Zsolt Mészáros
13	Iceland	Hallgrimur Egilsson, Vitor Manuel Guerra Charrua, Thorgeir Guðmundsson, Throstur Ingimarsson
14	Ireland	Steve Lennon, Michael Meaney, David O'Connor, John Flood
15	Isle of Man	Paul Kelly, Wayne Harrison, Ian Fields, Robbie Nelson
16	Italy	Danilo Vigato, Luca Catallo, Daniele Sergi, Stefano Tomassetti
17	Jersey	Craig Quemard, Steve Eusebini, Phil Speak, Bobby Williams
18	Latvia	Aigars Strelis, Madars Razma, Nauris Gleglu, Guntars Stipins
19	Lithuania	Ugnius Jankūnas, Mindaugas Barauskas, Osvaldas Kšanys, Darius Labanauskas
20	Luxembourg	Steven Miles, Tom Burquel, Tom Becker, Sebastien Lemmer
21	Malta	Vincent Busutill, Gordon Stanmore, Albert Scerri, Norbert Attard
22	Netherlands	Wesley Harms, Richard Veenstra, Jeffrey Sparidaans, Gino Vos
23	Northern Ireland	Chris Gilliland, Kyle McKinstry, Neil Duff, Peter Shaw
24	Norway	Kenneth Svardal, Vegar Elvevoll, Cor Dekker, Kent Sivertsen
25	Poland	Krzysztof Chmielewski, Grzegorz Działkowski, Krzysztof Gontarewicz, Paweł Wołynka
26	Romania	Adrian Frim, Razvan Negot, Laszlo Kadar, Gabriel Pascaru
27	Scotland	Ross Montgomery, Craig Quinn, Alan Soutar, Steve Ritchie
28	Serbia	Oliver Ferenc, Tihomir Patrik, Aco Babic, Dejan Kovacevic
29	Sweden	Daniel Larsson, Tony Alanentalo, Andreas Harrysson, Oskar Lukasiak
30	Switzerland	Philipp Ruckstuhl, Patrick Rey, Jorge Fonseca, Marcel Hirzel
31	Spain	Stephen-Charles Hatton, Carlos Segura, Antonio Munoz Ramos, Phillip Stockton
32	Turkey	Mursel Yavuz, Cagri Turgut, Umit Uygunsozlu, Semih Pismis
33	Wales	Martin Phillips, Nick Kenny, Wayne Warren, Jim Williams

Nr.	Country	Woman's Selection
1	Belgium	Els Verpoorten, Carine Dessein, Lynn Taeymans, Peggy Van Ballaert
2	Czech Republic	Jana Kanovská, Jitka Cisarová, Dagmar Komorová, Hana Belobrádková
3	Denmark	Berit Schouw, Henriette Honoré, Janni Larsen, Kirsten Byø
4	England	Trina Gulliver, Deta Hedman, Fallon Sherrock, Lorraine Winstanley
5	Finland	Kaisu Rekinen, Lumi Silvan, Sari Nikula, Marika Juhola
6	France	Dorothee Lemaire, Elodie Valentin, Angélique Flahauw, Carole Frison
7	Germany	Stefanie Lück, Stefanie Rennoch, Anne Willkomm, Silke Lowe
8	Greece	Maria Poulidou, Giota Sfakioti, Evdokia Nakka, Anastasia Pentagioti
9	Hungary	Viktória Kiss, Klaudia Horváth, Nóra Fekete, Nikolett Wachter
10	Iceland	Jóhanna Bergsdóttir, Ólafía Guðmundsdóttir, Ingibjörg Magnúsdóttir, Elinborg Steinunardóttir
11	Ireland	Robyn Byrne, Linda Harte, Olive McIntyre, Veronica Skeffington
12	Isle of Man	Margaret Kelly, Wendy Andrews, Nikki Bardsley, Janine Halsall
13	Italy	Giada Ciofi, Michela Michelini, Marzia Catino, Giada Marani
14	Latvia	Anda Seimane, Kristine Kuzmane, Zeltite Strade, Irena Bauze
15	Lithuania	Asta Juknienė, Rūta Šereškova, Renata Vaikutienė, Algina Juknaitė
16	Netherlands	Aileen de Graaf, Sharon Prins, Anneke Kuijten, Anca Zijlstra
17	Northern Ireland	Grace Crane, Gail Mullan, Margaret Coulter, Kayleigh O'Neill
18	Norway	Iselin Hauen, Lise Gro Finnestad, Ramona Mostad Eriksen, Rachna David
19	Poland	Karolina Podgórska, Katarzyna Żabka, Małgorzata Markowska, Renata Słowikowska
20	Romania	Oana Diana Birsan, Monica Dan, Oana Cimpoca, Doriana Elena Epuran
21	Scotland	Frances Lawson, Kate Smith, Lorriane Hyde, Lynn Cowan
22	Serbia	Marija Bogunovic, Tamara Milic, Djurdjina Miscevic, Jelena Popov
23	Sweden	Paulina Söderström, Maud Jansson, Vicky Pruim, Kristiinna Pruim Korpi
24	Switzerland	Jeannette Stoop, Katharina Von Rufs, Colette Rudin, Angela Heinrich
25	Turkey	Rabia Uslu, Necla Sahin, Emine Erkan, Ayca Ozmen
26	Wales	Rhian Edwards, Katie Bellerby, Rhian Griffiths, Ann-Marie Potts

== Men's singles ==
1st Round (best of 7 legs)
Michael Meaney	3
Oliver Ferenc	4
Razyan Negot	0
Michal Šmeyda	4
Tom Burquel	4
Manuel Vilerio	2
James Hurrell	4
Argyris Soteriou	2
Marcel Hirzel	4
Guntars Stipins	2
Krzysztof Gontarewicz	0
Kenneth Svardal	4
Ulf Ceder	4
Thorgeir Guðmundsson	0
Stefanos Samouchos	1
Andreas Harrysson	4
Neil Duff	4
Jens Ziegler	2
Wayne Warren	2
Stefano Tomassetti	4
Gábor Takács	4
Phil Speak	1
Cagri Turgut	3
Sven Wens	4
Cyril Blot	2
Lars Helsinghof	4
Vince Busuttil	4
Josep Arimany	1
Osvaldas Kšanys	0
Paul Kelly	4
Alan Soutar	3
Gino Vos	4
Glen Durrant	3
Stephen Lennon	4
Ugnius Jankúnas	2
Wayne Halliwell	4
Jacques Labre	0
Krzysztof Chmielewski	4
Kyle McKinstry	4
Gordon Stanmore	1
Craig Quemard	1
Marko Kantele	4
Nauris Gleglu	4
Pál Székely	0
Halgrímur Egilsson	2
Gabriel Pascaru	4
Sebastien Lemmer	2
Daniel Zygla	4
Wesley Harms	2
Mogens Christensen	4
Patrick Rey	3
Gerasimos Krontiris	4
Wayne Harisson	2
Tony Alanentalo	4
Tihomir Patrik	4
Javier Velasco	2
Luca Catallo	4
George Federico	1
Jakub Milo	4
Semih Pismis	0
Jeffrey Van Egdom	2
Craig Quinn	4
Kent Sivertsen	2
Jim Williams	4
Daniele Sergi	1
Steven Miles	4
Mindaugas Barauskas	4
Tatu Pehkonen	0
Ross Montgomery	4
Jamie Hughes	1
Pawel Wolynka	0
Phillipp Ruckstuhl	4
Aco Babic	3
John Ross	4
David O'Connor	2
Martin Phillips	4
Steve Eusebini	4
Mursel Yavez	2
Ian Fields	2
Thibault Tricole	4
Martin Schindler	4
Ulrich Meyn	2
Justin Broton	4
Lazlo Kadar	2
Aigars Strelis	2
Cor Dekker	4
Zsolt Mészáros	4
Carles Arola	2
Michail Vlassis	1
Chris Gilliland	4
Throsdur Ingimarsson	2
Albert Scerri	4
Sven Verdonck	3
Richard Veenstra	4
Pavel Jirkal	1
Daniel Larsson	4
Marko Puls	4
Yoann Belchun	0
Dejan Kovacevic	0
Vegar Elvevoll	4
Raul Invernon	1
Asko Niskala	4
John Flood	4
Jorge Fonseca	3
Vitor Manuel Guerra Charrua	4
Nikolas Economou	1
Jeffrey Sparidaans	4
Grzegorz Dzialkowski	0
Alex Jensen	4
Adrian Frim	2
Ioannis Selachoglou	2
Tom Becker	4
Robbie Nelson	2
Nick Kenny	4
Bobby Williams	1
David Francis	4
Peter Shaw	4
Michael Ondo	2
Roger Janssen	1
Patrik Kovács	4
Steve Ritchie	4
Madars Razma	3
Umit Uygunsozlu	2
Oskar Lukasiak	4
Norbert Attard	4
Scott Mitchell	3
Danilo Vigato	0
Darius Labanauskas	4

2nd Round (best of 7 legs)
Oliver Ferenc	4
Michal Šmejda	3
Tom Burquel	0
James Hurrell	4
Marcel Hirzel	0
Kenneth Svardal	4
Ulf Ceder	2
Andreas Harrysson	4
Neil Duff	3
Stefano Tomassetti	4
Gábor Takács	2
Sven Wens	4
Lars Helsinghof	4
Vince Busuttil	0
Paul Kelly	1
Gino Vos	4
Stephen Lennon	1
Wayne Halliwell	4
Krzysztof Chmielewski	4
Kyle McKinstry	3
Marko Kantele	4
Nauris Gleglu	0
Gabriel Pascaru	3
Daniel Zygla	4
Mogens Christensen	4
Gerasimos Krontiris	1
Tony Alanentalo	4
Tihomir Patrik	0
Luca Catallo	4
Jakub Milo	1
Craig Quinn	3
Jim Williams	4
Steven Miles	4
Mindaugas Barauskas	2
Ross Montgomery	4
Phillipp Ruckstuhl	3
John Ross	0
Martin Phillips	4
Steve Eusebini	1
Thibault Tricole	4
Martin Schindler	1
Justin Broton	4
Cor Dekker	4
Zsolt Mészáros	0
Chris Gilliland	3
Albert Scerri	4
Richard Veenstra	4
Daniel Larsson	2
Marko Puls	1
Vegar Elvevoll	4
Asko Niskala	4
John Flood	3
Vitor Manuel Guerra Charrua	0
Jeffrey Sparidaans	4
Alex Jensen	4
Tom Becker	3
Nick Kenny	4
David Francis	0
Peter Shaw	4
Patrik Kovács	3
Steve Ritchie	2
Oskar Lukasiak	4
Norbert Attard	4
Darius Labanauskas	1

3rd Round (best of 7 legs)
Oliver Ferenc	4
James Hurrell	3
Kenneth Svardal	2
Andreas Harrysson	4
Stefano Tomassetti	0
Sven Wens	4
Lars Helsinghof	0
Gino Vos	4
Wayne Halliwell	2
Krzysztof Chmielewski	4
Marko Kantele	2
Daniel Zygla	4
Mogens Christensen	4
Tony Alanentalo	2
Luca Catallo	3
Jim Williams	4
Steven Miles	4
Ross Montgomery	0
Martin Phillips	1
Thibault Tricole	4
Justin Broton	0
Cor Dekker	4
Albert Scerri	3
Richard Veenstra	4
Vegar Elvevoll	0
Asko Niskala	4
Jeffrey Sparidaans	0
Alex Jensen	4
Nick Kenny	2
Peter Shaw	4
Oskar Lukasiak	1
Norbert Attard	4

4th Round (best of 7 legs)
Oliver Ferenc	2
Andreas Harrysson	4
Sven Wens	4
Gino Vos	2
Krzysztof Chmielewski	3
Daniel Zygla	4
Mogens Christensen	0
Jim Williams	4
Steven Miles	3
Thibault Tricole	4
Cor Dekker	1
Richard Veenstra	4
Asko Niskala	3
Alex Jensen	4
Peter Shaw	2
Norbert Attard	4

Quarter-finals (best of 9 legs)
Andreas Harrysson	5
Sven Wens	2
Daniel Zygla	4
Jim Williams	5
Thibault Tricole	3
Richard Veenstra	5
Alex Jensen	4
Norbert Attard	5

Semi-finals (best of 11 legs)
Andreas Harrysson	3
Jim Williams	6
Final (best of 13 legs)
Jim Williams	5
Richard Veenstra	7
Richard Veenstra	6
Norbert Attard	1

== Men's Pairs ==
1st Round (best of 7 legs)
Scott Mitchell; James Hurrell	4
Pavel Jirkal; Jakub Milo	1
Guntars Stipins; Nauris Gleglu	1
Mursel Yavuz; Umit Uygunsozlu	4
Daniel Zygla; Martin Schindler	4
Wayne Harisson; Robbie Nelson	1
George Federico; David Francis	3
Craig Quinn; Steve Ritchie	4
Pawel Wolynka; Krzusztof Gontarewicz	4
Michail Vlassis; Ioannis Selachoglou	2
Darius Labanauskas; Mindaugas Barauskas	4
Kent Sivertsen; Cor Dekker	0
Argyris Soteriou; Nikolas Economou	1
Sebastien Lemmer; Tom Becker	4
Alex Jensen; Lars Helsinghof	3
Wesley Harms; Richard Veenstra	4
Ulf Ceder; Asko Niskala	4
Gábor Takács; Zsolt Mészáros	3
Laszlo Kadar; Gabriel Pascaru	3
Oliver Ferenc; Tihomir Patrik	4
Sven Wens; Jeffrey van Egdom	2
David O'Connor; John Flood	4
Josep Arimany; Raul Invernon	3
Gordon Stanmore; Vincent Busutill	4
Daniele Sergi; Luca Catallo	4
Vitor Manuel Guerra Charrua; Hallgrimur Egilsson	3
Patrick Rey] Jorge Fonseca	4
Jacques Labre; Yoann Belchun	2
Phil Speak; Bobby Williams	0
Jim Williams; Nick Kenny	4
Daniel Larsson; Tony Alanentalo	4
Neil Duff; Kyle McKinstry	3
Stefanos Samouchos; Gerasimos Krontiris	4
Norbert Attard; Albert Scerri	3
Krzysztof Chmielewski; Grzegorz Dzialkowski	3
Michal Šmejda; Michal Ondo	4
Aigars Strelis; Madars Razma	3
Aco Babic; Dejan Kovacevic	4
Paul Kelly; Ian Fields	2
Roger Janssen; Sven Verdonck	4
Andreas Harrysson; Oskar Lukasiak	4
Wayne Halliwell; John Ross	0
Peter Shaw; Chris Gilliland	0
Marko Puls; Jens Ziegler	4
Marko Kantele; Tatu Pehkonen	4
Adrian Frim; Razvan Negot	2
Martin Phillips; Wayne Warren	4
Mogens Christensen; Ulrich Meyn	3
Michael Meaney; Stephen Lennon	4
Steven Miles; Tom Burquel	1
Throstur Ingimarsson; Thorgeir Guðmundsson	1
Pál Székely; Patrik Kovács	4
Jeffrey Sparidaans; Gino Vos	1
Kenneth Svardal; Vegar Elvevoll	4
Philipp Ruckstuhl; Marcel Hirzel	3
Stefano Tomassetti; Danilo Vigato	4
Cyril Blot; Thibault Tricole	0
Glen Durrant; Jamie Hughes	4
Ugnius Jankūnas; Osvaldas Kšanys	4
Manuel Vilerio; Justin Broton	2
Cagri Turgut; Semih Pismis	0
Carles Arola; Javier Velasco	4
Steve Eusebini; Craig Quemard	0
Ross Montgomery; Alan Soutar	4

2nd Round (best of 7 legs)
Scott Mitchell; James Hurrell	4
Mursel Yavuz; Umit Uygunsozlu	2
Daniel Zygla; Martin Schindler	4
Craig Quinn; Steve Ritchie	3
Pawel Wolynka; Krzusztof Gontarewicz	3
Darius Labanauskas; Mindaugas Barauskas	4
Sebastien Lemmer; Tom Becker	1
Wesley Harms; Richard Veenstra	4
Ulf Ceder; Asko Niskala	4
Oliver Ferenc; Tihomir Patrik	2
David O'Connor; John Flood	4
Gordon Stanmore; Vincent Busutill	0
Daniele Sergi; Luca Catallo	4
Patrick Rey; Jorge Fonseca	3
Jim Williams; Nick Kenny	3
Daniel Larsson; Tony Alanentalo	4
Stefanos Samouchos; Gerasimos Krontiris	4
Michal Šmejda; Michal Ondo	3
Aco Babic; Dejan Kovacevic	4
Roger Janssen; Sven Verdonck	2
Andreas Harrysson; Oskar Lukasiak	4
Marko Puls; Jens Ziegler	0
Marko Kantele; Tatu Pehkonen	4
Martin Phillips; Wayne Warren	1
Michael Meaney; Stephen Lennon	4
Pál Székely; Patrik Kovács	2
Kenneth Svardal; Vegar Elvevoll	2
Stefano Tomassetti; Danilo Vigato	4
Glen Durrant; Jamie Hughes	4
Ugnius Jankūnas; Osvaldas Kšanys	0
Carles Arola; Javier Velasco	2
Ross Montgomery; Alan Soutar	4

3rd Round (best of 7 legs)
Scott Mitchell; James Hurrell	4
Daniel Zygla; Martin Schindler	1
Darius Labanauskas; Mindaugas Barauskas	1
Wesley Harms; Richard Veenstra	4
Ulf Ceder; Asko Niskala	3
David O'Connor; John Flood	4
Daniele Sergi; Luca Catallo	3
Daniel Larsson; Tony Alanentalo	4
Stefanos Samouchos; Gerasimos Krontiris	4
Aco Babic; Dejan Kovacevic	1
Andreas Harrysson; Oskar Lukasiak	4
Marko Kantele; Tatu Pehkonen	2
Michael Meaney; Stephen Lennon	4
Stefano Tomassetti; Danilo Vigato	0
Glen Durrant; Jamie Hughes	1
Ross Montgomery; Alan Soutar	4

Quarter-finals (best of 7 legs)
Scott Mitchell; James Hurrell	2
Wesley Harms; Richard Veenstra	4
David O'Connor; John Flood	4
Daniel Larsson; Tony Alanentalo	2
Stefanos Samouchos; Gerasimos Krontiris	2
Andreas Harrysson; Oskar Lukasiak	4
Michael Meaney; Stephen Lennon	3
Ross Montgomery; Alan Soutar	4

Semi-finals (best of 9 legs)
Wesley Harms; Richard Veenstra	5
David O'Connor; John Flood	2
Andreas Harrysson; Oskar Lukasiak	1
Ross Montgomery; Alan Soutar	5

Final (best of 11 legs)
Wesley Harms; Richard Veenstra	6
Ross Montgomery; Alan Soutar	2

== Men's team ==
Round Robin

Group A

Pos	Team	Pld	Win	Lose	LF	LA	+/-
1	Norway	3	2	1	25	12	+10
2	Wales	3	2	1	20	12	+8
3	France	3	2	1	18	18	0
4	Cyprus	3	0	3	9	27	-18

- Norway 9 - 2 Wales
- Norway 9 - 4 Cyprus
- Wales 9 - 0 France
- Wales 9 - 3 Cyprus
- France 9 - 7 Norway
- France 9 - 2 Cyprus

Group B

Pos	Team	Pld	Win	Lose	LF	LA	+/-
1	Malta	3	3	0	27	14	+13
2	Luxembourg	3	2	1	24	22	+2
3	Germany	3	1	2	21	24	-3
4	Iceland	3	0	3	15	27	-12

- Malta 9 - 6 Luxembourg
- Malta 9 - 4 Germany
- Malta 9 - 4 Iceland
- Luxembourg 9 - 8 Germany
- Luxembourg 9 - 5 Iceland
- Germany 9 - 6 Iceland

Group C

Pos	Team	Pld	Win	Lose	LF	LA	+/-
1	Sweden	3	3	0	27	15	+12
2	Scotland	3	2	1	25	14	+11
3	Gibraltar	3	1	2	14	20	-6
4	Hungary	3	0	3	7	27	-20

- Sweden 9 - 7 Scotland
- Sweden 9 - 3 Gibraltar
- Sweden 9 - 2 Hungary
- Scotland 9 - 2 Gibraltar
- Scotland 9 - 3 Hungary
- Gibraltar 9 - 2 Hungary

Group D

Pos	Team	Pld	Win	Lose	LF	LA	+/-
1	Netherlands	3	3	0	27	8	+19
2	Poland	3	2	1	21	19	+2
3	Switzerland	3	1	2	19	21	-2
4	Turkey	3	0	3	8	27	-19

- Netherlands 9 - 3 Poland
- Netherlands 9 - 4 Switzerland
- Netherlands 9 - 1 Turkey
- Poland 9 - 6 Switzerland
- Poland 9 - 4 Turkey
- Switzerland 9 - 3 Turkey

Group E

Pos	Team	Pld	Win	Lose	LF	LA	+/-
1	Northern Ireland	3	3	0	27	10	+17
2	Serbia	3	2	1	21	20	+1
3	Catalonia	3	1	2	19	24	-5
4	Isle of Man	3	0	3	14	27	-13

- Northern Ireland 9 - 3 Serbia
- Northern Ireland 9 - 3 Catalonia
- Northern Ireland 9 - 4 Isle of Man
- Serbia 9 - 7 Catalonia
- Serbia 9 - 4 Isle of Man
- Catalonia 9 - 6 Isle of Man

Group F

Pos	Team	Pld	Win	Lose	LF	LA	+/-
1	Belgium	3	3	0	27	10	+17
2	Lithuania	3	2	1	21	16	+5
3	Latvia	3	1	2	18	19	-1
4	Greece	3	0	3	14	27	-13

- Belgium 9 - 3 Lithuania
- Belgium 9 - 6 Latvia
- Belgium 9 - 1 Greece
- Lithuania 9 - 3 Latvia
- Lithuania 9 - 4 Greece
- Latvia 9 - 1 Greece

Group G

Pos	Team	Pld	Win	Lose	LF	LA	+/-
1	Finland	3	3	0	27	14	+13
2	Denmark	3	2	1	23	14	+9
3	Ireland	3	1	3	17	20	-3
4	Jersey	3	0	3	8	27	-19

- Finland 9 - 5 Denmark
- Finland 9 - 6 Ireland
- Finland 9 - 3 Jersey
- Denmark 9 - 2 Ireland
- Denmark 9 - 3 Jersey
- Ireland 9 - 2 Jersey

Group H

Pos	Team	Pld	Win	Lose	LF	LA	+/-
1	England	3	3	0	27	5	+22
2	Romania	3	2	1	20	20	0
3	Czech Republic	3	1	2	17	23	-6
4	Italy	3	0	3	11	27	-16

- England 9 - 2 Romania
- England 9 - 1 Czech Republic
- England 9 - 2 Italy
- Romania 9 - 7 Czech Republic
- Romania 9 - 4 Italy
- Czech Republic 9 - 5 Italy

Knock Out

Last 16 (best of 17 legs)
A1	Norway	7
D2	Poland	9
B1	Malta	4
C2	Scotland	9
C1	Sweden	9
B2	Luxembourg	5
D1	Netherlands	9
A2	Wales	4
E1	Northern Ireland	9
H2	Romania	3
F1	Belgium	2
G2	Denmark	9
G1	Finland	9
F2	Lithuania	6
H1	England	9
E2	Serbia	4

Quarter-finals (best of 17 legs)
D2	Poland	6
C2	Scotland	9
C1	Sweden	4
D1	Netherlands	9
E1	Northern Ireland	9
G2	Denmark	6
G1	Finland	2
H1	England	9

Semi-finals (best of 17 legs)
C2	Scotland	6
D1	Netherlands	9
E1	Northern Ireland	1
H1	England	9

Final (best of 17 legs)
D1	Netherlands	6
H1	England	9

== Woman's singles ==
1st Round (best of 7 legs)
Deta Hedman
Bye
Sharon Prins	4
Anne Willkomm	1
Maud Jansson	4
Margaret Coulter	2
Wendy Andrews	1
Marika Juhola	4
Djurdjina Miscevic
Bye
Lynn Taeymans	4
Kristine Kuzmane	3
Renata Vaikutiene	1
Giota Sfakioti	4
Oana Birsan
Bye
Klaudia Horváth
Bye
Necla Sahin	1
Dagmar Komorová	4
Iselin Hauen	4
Elinborg Steinunnardóttir	1
Angélique Flahauw
Bye
Veronica Skeffington	1
Kate Smith	4
Marzia Catino	3
Kirsten Byø	4
Katie Bellerby	4
Angela Heinrich
Renata Slowikowska
Bye
Rachna David
Bye
Stefanie Lück	4
Ingibjörg Magnúsdóttir	1
Paulina Söderström	4
Olive McIntyre	0
Janine Halsall	4
Monica Dan	0
Rhian Griffiths
Bye
Kayleigh O'Neill	4
Anda Seimane	3
Asta Jukniene	0
Trina Gulliver	4
Rabia Uslu
Bye
Michela Michelini
Bye
Carole Frison	2
Carine Dessein	4
Malgorzata Markowska	2
Maria Poulidou	4
Sari Nikula
Bye
Berit Schouw	3
Tamara Milic	4
Lynn Cowan	4
Nikolett Wachter	0
Jeannette Stoop	4
Hana Belobrádková	3
Anca Zijlstra
Bye
Stefanie Rennoch
Bye
Kristiinna Pruim Korpi	4
Emine Erkan	0
Nikki Bardsley	1
Linda Harte	4
Peggy Van Ballaert	4
Marija Bogunovic	0
Anastasia Pentagioti
Bye
Elodie Valentin	4
Colette Rudin	3
Ann-Marie Potts	4
Irena Bauze	0
Grace Crane
Bye
Henriette Honoré
Bye
Kaisu Rekinen	'0
Lorraine Winstanley	4
Giada Marani	4
Doriana Epuran	2
Rúta Šereškova
Bye
Ólafia Gudmundsdóttir	0
Jana Kanovská	4
Viktória Kiss	4
Lise Gro Finnestad	1
Anneke Kuijten	4
Katarzyna Zabka	1
Frances Lawson
Bye
Vicky Pruim
Bye
Oana Cimpoca	1
Janni Larsen	4
Algina Juknaite	0
Silke Lowe	4
Fallon Sherrock	4
Evdokia Nakka	1
Jitka Císarová
Bye
Robyn Byrne	4
Giada Ciofi	2
Lorraine Hyde	2
Lumi Silvan	4
Katharina Von Rufs
Bye
Dorothée Lemaire
Bye
Margaret Kelly	1
Ramona Eriksen	4
Rhian Edwards	1
Aileen de Graaf	4
Els Verpoorten
Bye
Gail Mullan	0
Karolina Podgórska	4
Jelena Popov	4
Jóhanna Bergsdóttir	0
Ayca Ozmen	0
Nóra Fekete	4
Zeltite Strade
Bye

2nd Round (best of 7 legs)
Deta Hedman	3
Sharon Prins	4
Maud Jansson	4
Marika Juhola	2
Djurdjina Miscevic	4
Lynn Taeymans	2
Giota Sfakioti	3
Oana Birsan	4
Klaudia Horváth	2
Dagmar Komorová	4
Iselin Hauen	4
Angélique Flahauw	1
Kate Smith	4
Kirsten Byø	2
Katie Bellerby	4
Renata Slowikowska	0
Rachna David	4
Stefanie Lück	0
Paulina Söderström	4
Janine Halsall	1
Rhian Griffiths	4
Kayleigh O'Neill	1
Trina Gulliver	4
Rabia Uslu	0
Michela Michelini	3
Carine Dessein	4
Maria Poulidou	1
Sari Nikula	4
Tamara Milic	3
Lynn Cowan	4
Jeannette Stoop	2
Anca Zijlstra	4
Stefanie Rennoch	4
Kristiinna Pruim Korpi	0
Linda Harte	4
Peggy Van Ballaert	3
Anastasia Pentagioti	2
Elodie Valentin	4
Ann-Marie Potts	4
Grace Crane	2
Henriette Honoré	2
Lorraine Winstanley	4
Giada Marani	4
Rúta Šereškova	3
Jana Kanovská	2
Viktória Kiss	4
Anneke Kuijten	4
Frances Lawson	1
Vicky Pruim	4
Janni Larsen	2
Silke Lowe	0
Fallon Sherrock	4
Jitka Císarová	2
Robyn Byrne	4
Lumi Silvan	4
Katharina Von Rufs	3
Dorothée Lemaire	1
Ramona Eriksen	4
Aileen de Graaf	4
Els Verpoorten	0
Karolina Podgórska	4
Jelena Popov	1
Nóra Fekete	4
Zeltite Strade	1

3rd Round (best of 7 legs)
Sharon Prins	4
Maud Jansson	0
Djurdjina Miscevic	4
Oana Birsan	0
Dagmar Komorová	1
Iselin Hauen	4
Kate Smith	4
Katie Bellerby	3
Rachna David	4
Paulina Söderström	3
Rhian Griffiths	1
Trina Gulliver	4
Carine Dessein	4
Sari Nikula	3
Lynn Cowan	0
Anca Zijlstra	4
Stefanie Rennoch	4
Linda Harte	3
Elodie Valentin	0
Ann-Marie Potts	4
Lorraine Winstanley	4
Giada Marani	0
Viktória Kiss	3
Anneke Kuijten	4
Vicky Pruim	0
Fallon Sherrock	4
Robyn Byrne	2
Lumi Silvan	4
Ramona Eriksen	1
Aileen de Graaf	4
Karolina Podgórska	0
Nóra Fekete	4

4th Round (best of 7 legs)
Sharon Prins	4
Djurdjina Miscevic	2
Iselin Hauen	2
Kate Smith	4
Rachna David	0
Trina Gulliver	4
Carine Dessein	4
Anca Zijlstra	3
Stefanie Rennoch	4
Ann-Marie Potts	0
Lorraine Winstanley	4
Anneke Kuijten	0
Fallon Sherrock	4
Lumi Silvan	1
Aileen de Graaf	4
Nóra Fekete	1

Quarter-finals (best of 9 legs)
Sharon Prins	5
Kate Smith	3
Trina Gulliver	5
Carine Dessein	2
Stefanie Rennoch	1
Lorraine Winstanley	5
Fallon Sherrock	5
Aileen de Graaf	2

Semi-finals (best of 11 legs)
Sharon Prins	6
Trina Gulliver	2
Final (best of 13 legs)
Sharon Prins	7
Fallon Sherrock	3
Lorraine Winstanley	5
Fallon Sherrock	6

== Woman's Pairs ==
1st Round (best of 7 legs)
Stefanie Rennoch; Stefanie Lück
Bye
Anda Seimane; Kristine Kuzmane	4
Lise Gro Finnestad; Iselin Hauen	3
Margaret Coulter; Gail Mullan	3
Margaret Kelly; Wendy Andrews	4
Marija Bogunovic; Jelena Popov	2
Jeannette Stoop; Colette Rudin	4
Carine Dessein; Peggy Van Ballaert
Bye
Oana Diana Birsan; Monica Dan	0
Anca Zijlstra; Anneke Kuijten	4
Kirsten Byø; Henriette Honoré	2
Giada Marani; Marzia Catino	4
Jóhanna Bergsdóttir; Ólafía Guðmundsdóttir
Bye
Rhian Edwards; Rhian Griffiths
Bye
Frances Lawson; Kate Smith	0
Trina Gulliver; Fallon Sherrock	4
Lumi Silvan; Kaisu Rekinen	4
Nóra Fekete; Viktória Kiss	2
Rabia Uslu; Necla Sahin
Bye
Asta Juknienė; Algina Juknaitė	2
Robyn Byrne; Linda Harte	4
Carole Frison; Dorothee Lemaire	4
Malgorzata Markowska; Karolina Podgorska	3
Dagmar Komorová; Hana Belobrádková	4
Maria Poulidou; Anastasia Pentagioti	2
Vicky Pruim; Kristiinna Pruim Korpi
Bye
Aileen de Graaf; Sharon Prins
Bye
Olive McIntyre; Veronica Skeffington	4
Oana Cimpoca; Doriana Elena Epuran	3
Rūta Šereškova; Renata Vaikutienė	2
Giada Ciofi; Michela Michelini	4
Elinborg Steinunardóttir; Ingibjörg Magnúsdóttir	0
Anne Willkomm; Silke Lowe	4
Jana Kanovská; Jitka Cisarová
Bye
Elodie Valentin; Angélique Flahauw	2
Klaudia Horváth; Nikolett Wachter	4
Nikki Bardsley; Janine Halsall	1
Lorriane Hyde; Lynn Cowan	4
Janni Larsen; Berit Schouw
Bye
Grace Crane; Kayleigh O'Neill
Bye
Renata Slowikowska; Katarzyna Zabka	3
Paulina Söderström; Maud Jansson	4
Katharina Von Rufs; Angela Heinrich	1
Sari Nikula; Marika Juhola	4
Tamara Milic; Djurdjina Miscevic
Bye
Irena Bauze; Zeltite Strade	4
Giota Sfakioti; Evdokia Nakka	2
Rachna David; Ramona Mostad Eriksen	4
Katie Bellerby; Ann-Marie Potts	2
Lynn Taeymans; Els Verpoorten	4
Emine Erkan; Ayca Ozmen	1
Deta Hedman; Lorraine Winstanley
Bye

2nd Round (best of 7 legs)
Stefanie Rennoch; Stefanie Lück	4
Anda Seimane; Kristine Kuzmane	0
Margaret Kelly; Wendy Andrews	3
Jeannette Stoop; Colette Rudin	4
Carine Dessein; Peggy Van Ballaert	1
Anca Zijlstra; Anneke Kuijten	4
Giada Marani; Marzia Catino	4
Jóhanna Bergsdóttir; Ólafía Guðmundsdóttir	0
Rhian Edwards; Rhian Griffiths	4
Trina Gulliver; Fallon Sherrock	0
Lumi Silvan; Kaisu Rekinen	4
Rabia Uslu; Necla Sahin	0
Robyn Byrne; Linda Harte	3
Carole Frison; Dorothee Lemaire	4
Dagmar Komorová; Hana Belobrádková	3
Vicky Pruim; Kristiinna Pruim Korpi	4
Aileen de Graaf; Sharon Prins	4
Olive McIntyre; Veronica Skeffington	0
Giada Ciofi; Michela Michelini	1
Anne Willkomm; Silke Lowe	4
Jana Kanovská; Jitka Cisarová	4
Klaudia Horváth; Nikolett Wachter	3
Lorriane Hyde; Lynn Cowan	0
Janni Larsen; Berit Schouw	4
Grace Crane; Kayleigh O'Neill	1
Paulina Söderström; Maud Jansson	4
Sari Nikula; Marika Juhola	4
Tamara Milic; Djurdjina Miscevic	0
Irena Bauze; Zeltite Strade	1
Rachna David; Ramona Mostad Eriksen	4
Lynn Taeymans; Els Verpoorten	1
Deta Hedman; Lorraine Winstanley	4

3rd Round (best of 7 legs)
Stefanie Rennoch; Stefanie Lück	4
Jeannette Stoop; Colette Rudin	2
Anca Zijlstra; Anneke Kuijten	4
Giada Marani; Marzia Catino	1
Rhian Edwards; Rhian Griffiths	4
Lumi Silvan; Kaisu Rekinen	1
Carole Frison; Dorothee Lemaire	2
Vicky Pruim; Kristiinna Pruim Korpi	4
Aileen de Graaf; Sharon Prins	3
Anne Willkomm; Silke Lowe	4
Jana Kanovská; Jitka Cisarová	4
Janni Larsen; Berit Schouw	0
Paulina Söderström; Maud Jansson	4
Sari Nikula; Marika Juhola	0
Rachna David; Ramona Mostad Eriksen	2
Deta Hedman; Lorraine Winstanley	4

Quarter-finals (best of 7 legs)
Stefanie Rennoch; Stefanie Lück	4
Anca Zijlstra; Anneke Kuijten	1
Rhian Edwards; Rhian Griffiths	4
Vicky Pruim; Kristiinna Pruim Korpi	3
Anne Willkomm; Silke Lowe	4
Jana Kanovská; Jitka Cisarová	0
Paulina Söderström; Maud Jansson	0
Deta Hedman; Lorraine Winstanley	4

Semi-finals (best of 9 legs)
Stefanie Rennoch; Stefanie Lück	2
Rhian Edwards; Rhian Griffiths	5
Anne Willkomm; Silke Lowe	2
Deta Hedman; Lorraine Winstanley	5

Final (best of 11 legs)
Rhian Edwards; Rhian Griffiths	6
Deta Hedman; Lorraine Winstanley	5

== Woman's Team ==
Round Robin

Group A

Pos	Team	Pld	Win	Lose	LF	LA	+/-
1	England	3	3	0	27	1	+26
2	Switzerland	3	2	1	18	21	-3
3	Hungary	3	1	2	18	24	-6
4	Belgium	3	0	3	10	27	-17

- England 9 - 0 Switzerland
- England 9 - 1 Hungary
- England 9 - 0 Belgium
- Switzerland 9 - 8 Hungary
- Switzerland 9 - 4 Belgium
- Hungary 9 - 6 Belgium

Group B

Pos	Team	Pld	Win	Lose	LF	LA	+/-
1	Czech Republic	2	2	0	18	8	+10
2	Italy	2	1	1	11	16	-5
3	Northern Ireland	2	0	2	13	18	-5

- Czech Republic 9 - 2 Italy
- Czech Republic 9 - 6 Northern Ireland
- Italy 9 - 7 Northern Ireland

Group C

Pos	Team	Pld	Win	Lose	LF	LA	+/-
1	Germany	2	2	0	18	5	+13
2	Poland	2	1	1	13	11	+2
3	Latvia	2	0	2	3	18	-15

- Germany 9 - 4 Poland
- Germany 9 - 1 Latvia
- Poland 9 - 2 Latvia

Group D

Pos	Team	Pld	Win	Lose	LF	LA	+/-
1	Finland	2	2	0	18	5	+13
2	Turkey	2	1	1	11	14	-3
3	France	2	0	2	8	18	-10

- Finland 9 - 2 Turkey
- Finland 9 - 3 France
- Turkey 9 - 5 France

Group E

Pos	Team	Pld	Win	Lose	LF	LA	+/-
1	Norway	2	2	0	18	7	+11
2	Denmark	2	1	1	13	10	+3
3	Iceland	2	0	2	4	18	-14

- Norway 9 - 4 Denmark
- Norway 9 - 3 Iceland
- Denmark 9 - 1 Iceland

Group F

Pos	Team	Pld	Win	Lose	LF	LA	+/-
1	Wales	2	2	0	18	6	+12
2	Sweden	2	1	1	15	13	+2
3	Greece	2	0	2	4	18	-14

- Wales 9 - 6 Sweden
- Wales 9 - 0 Greece
- Sweden 9 - 4 Greece

Group G

Pos	Team	Pld	Win	Lose	LF	LA	+/-
1	Ireland	2	2	0	18	5	+13
2	Romania	2	1	1	9	15	-6
3	Lithuania	2	0	2	11	18	-7

- Ireland 9 - 0 Romania
- Ireland 9 - 5 Lithuania
- Romania 9 - 6 Lithuania

Group H

Pos	Team	Pld	Win	Lose	LF	LA	+/-
1	Netherlands	3	3	0	27	4	+23
2	Scotland	3	2	1	21	15	+6
3	Serbia	3	1	2	13	22	-9
4	Isle of Man	3	0	3	7	27	-20

- Netherlands 9 - 3 Scotland
- Netherlands 9 - 1 Serbia
- Netherlands 9 - 0 Isle of Man
- Scotland 9 - 3 Serbia
- Scotland 9 - 3 Isle of Man
- Serbia 9 - 4 Isle of Man

Knock Out

Last 16 (best of 17 legs)
A1	England	9
D2	Turkey	0
B1	Czech Republic	9
C2	Poland	8
C1	Germany	9
B2	Italy	5
D1	Finland	9
A2	Switzerland	2
E1	Norway	9
H2	Scotland	7
F1	Wales	9
G2	Romania	0
G1	Ireland	9
F2	Sweden	6
H1	Netherlands	9
E2	Denmark	3

Quarter-finals (best of 17 legs)
A1	England	9
B1	Czech Republic	3
C1	Germany	9
D1	Finland	6
E1	Norway	5
F1	Wales	9
G1	Ireland	3
H1	Netherlands	9

Semi-finals (best of 17 legs)
A1	England	9
C1	Germany	4
F1	Wales	8
H1	Netherlands	9

Final (best of 17 legs)
A1	England	9
H1	Netherlands	3
