= 2012 WDF Europe Cup =

Tournament information
- Venue: Grand Haber Hotel
- Location: Kemer
- Country: Turkey
- Established: 31 October – 3 November
- Organisation(s): WDF
- Format: Legs

Champion(s)
- Singles (Scotland) Gary Stone (men's singles) (Belgium) Patricia De Peuter (women's singles); Pairs; Jan Dekker & Christian Kist (men's pairs) (Netherlands) Karin Krappen & Tamara Schuur (women's pairs); Team; Netherlands (men's team); Overall; Netherlands (men's overall); Netherlands (women's overall)

The 2012 WDF Europe Cup was the 18th edition of the WDF Europe Cup darts tournament, organised by the World Darts Federation. It was held in Kemer, Turkey from 31 October to 3 November 2012.

== Entered teams ==
32 countries/associations entered a men's selection in the event.

28 countries/associations entered a women's selection in the event.

Nr.	Country	Men's Selection
1	Austria	Christoph Kleindienst, Philip Karall, Stefan Kuntner, Christian Steindl
2	Belgium	Donnie Michels, Ronny Huybrechts, Geert De Vos, Davyd Venken
3	Bulgaria	Nikolai Krustev, Marin Marinov, Ivan Neykov, Krasimir Ivanov
4	CAT	Pere Grau, Xavier Pla, Doroteo Bermudez, Daniel Zapata
5	Czech Republic	Filip Slavik, Martin Popelka, Michal Ondo, Jiri Jenicek
6	Denmark	Vladimir Andersen, Frede Johansen, Glenn Honore, Stig Jorgensen
7	England	Martin Atkins, Martin Adams, Tony O'Shea, Scott Waites
8	Finland	Kim Viljanen, Jarkko Komula, Ulf Ceder, Jani Haavisto
9	France	Renaud Lescure, Thibault Tricole, Nicolas Thuillier, Martin Goodin
10	Germany	Colin Rice, Marko Puls, Benjamin Sensenschmidt, Olaf Tupuschis
11	Gibraltar	Dyson Parody, Manuel Vilerio, Dylan Duo, George Federico
12	Iceland	Hallgrimur Egilsson, Einar Moller, Hinrik Thordarson, Gudmundur Sigurdsson
13	Ireland	Stephen McDonnell, Terry McNulty, Jason Cullen, Sean McGowan
14	Isle of Man	Rob Corrin, Robert Nelson, Paul Sertin, Colin Tyrer
15	Italy	Daniele Sergi, Gianluca Grillini, Alessandro Colnaghi, Loris Polese
16	Jersey	Phil Speak, Dave Moore, Steve Eusebini, Eddie Le Bailly-snr
17	Lithuania	Tomas Sakys, Gintaras Nagevius, Darius Labanauskas, Arūnas Čiplys
18	Luxembourg	Mingo Claudiano, Tom Becker, Steven Miles, Joe Kieffer
19	Netherlands	Wesley Harms, Jan Dekker, Christian Kist, Benito van de Pas
20	Northern Ireland	Darren Clifford, David Glenn, Roy Baillie, Daryl Gurney
21	Norway	Vegar Elvevoll, Rune David, Øyvind Aasland, Robert Hansen
22	Poland	Krzysztof Wojciechowski, Patryk Żabka, Przemysław Bobrowski, Krzysztof Stróżyk
23	Romania	Vlad-Christian Popa, Ravzan Negot, Adrian Frim, Cristian Cimpoca
24	Russia	Boris Koltsov, Maksim Evmenenkov, Aleksei Kadochnikov, Roman Obukhov
25	Scotland	Gary Stone, Craig Baxter, Ross Montgomery, Alan Soutar
26	Serbia	Milan Stankovic, Tihomir Patrik, Ljubomir Krkljes, Oliver Ferenc
27	Slovenia	Andrej Gorjak, Damjan Pilinger, Joze Vautar, Sasa Vutek
28	Spain	Philip Stockton, Leonard Pitman, David Rogers, Kas van Golde
29	Sweden	Mats Andersson, Lennart Efraimsson, Johan Engström, Daniel Larsson
30	Switzerland	Daniel Van Allmen, Thomas Bremgartner, Christoph Kappeler, Reto Sigrist
31	Turkey	Emre Toros, Kagan Aytek, Engin Kayaoglu, Eser Tekin
32	Wales	Jonny Clayton, David Smith-Hayes, Wayne Warren, Martin Phillips

Nr.	Country	Woman's Selection
1	Austria	Karin Jahn & Petra Hristovski
2	Belgium	Patricia De Peuter & Joyce Janssens
3	Bulgaria	Kunka Ivanova & Anelia Eneva
4	Catalonia	Iolanda Riba & Laura Damont
5	Czech Republic	Radana Jandova & Iveta Bruska
6	Denmark	Janni Larsen & Charlotte Pedersen
7	England	Trina Gulliver & Deta Hedman
8	Finland	Lumi Silvan & Kirsi Viinikainen
9	France	Sandrine Valverde & Laure Schweitzer
10	Germany	Heike Ernst & Irina Armstrong
11	Iceland	Sigridur-Gudrun Jonsdottir & Petrea Fridriksdottir
12	Ireland	Caroline Breen & Angela De Ward
13	Italy	Barbara Osti & Giada Ciofi
14	Lithuania	Erika Bagdonaviciene & Renata Vaikutiene
15	Netherlands	Tamara Schuur & Karin Krappen
16	Northern Ireland	Grace Crane & Nicole Dillon
17	Norway	Rachna David & Hege Løkken
18	Poland	Jolanta Rzepka & Aleksandra Grzesik
19	Romania	Oana-Diana Birsan & Oana Nutu
20	Scotland	Susanna Young & Louise Hepburn
21	Serbia	Sanja Andjelkovic & Djurdina Miskovic
22	Slovenia	Gustin Blanka & Viktorija Klanecek
23	Spain	Paula Smith & Christine Hunt
24	Sweden	Kristin Bomander & Maud Jansson
25	Switzerland	Jeannette Stoop & Colette Rudin
26	Turkey	Cagla-Pinar Utkutug & Sedra Uzunca
27	Wales	Julie Gore & Rhian Edwards

== Men's singles ==
1st Round (best of 7 legs)
(Wales) David Smith-Hayes	4
(Gibraltar) Manuel Vilerio	0
(Romania) Adrian Frim	0
(Belgium) Geert De Vos	4
(Northern Ireland) Roy Baillie	4
(Germany) Colin Rice	2
(Turkey) Kagan Aytek	4
(Austria) Philip Karall	1
(Iceland) Hinrik Thordarson	1
(Serbia) Oliver Ferenc	4
(Republic of Ireland) Terry McNulty	4
(Jersey) Eddie Le Bailly-snr	3
(Denmark) Glenn Honore	4
(Spain) Philip Stockton	2
(Finland) Kim Viljanen	0
(Scotland) Gary Stone	4
(Bulgaria) Marin Marinov	1
(Italy) Daniele Sergi	4
(France) Thibault Tricole	3
(Russia) Boris Koltsov	4
(Sweden) Daniel Larsson	3
(Netherlands) Wesley Harms	4
(Poland) Krzysztof Strozyk	4
(Lithuania) Darius Labanauskas	0
(England) Martin Atkins	4
(Gibraltar) Dyson Parody	3
(Czech Republic) Martin Popelka	4
(Luxembourg) Tom Becker	1
(Catalonia) Pere Grau	3
(Slovenia) Sasa Vutek	4
(Norway) Øyvind Aasland	4
(Gibraltar) Dylan Duo	2
(Republic of Ireland) Sean McGowan	4
(Gibraltar) George Federico	1
(Spain) Leonard Pitman	0
(Netherlands) Benito van de Pas	4
(Finland) Ulf Ceder	4
(Italy) Gianluca Grillini	2
(Belgium) Davyd Venken	4
(Austria) Christian Steindl	1
(Luxembourg) Joe Kieffer	1
(Lithuania) Tomas Sakys	4
(Jersey) Steve Eusebini	0
(Russia) Roman Obukhov	4
(Switzerland) Daniel van Allmen	4
(Turkey) Engin Kayaoglu	2
(Bulgaria) Krasimir Ivanov	0
(Wales) Martin Phillips	4
(Poland) Przemyslaw Bobrowski	1
(Germany) Marko Puls	4
(Catalonia) Doroteo Bermudez	0
(Sweden) Mats Andersson	4
(France) Nicolas Thuillier	4
(Iceland) Einar Moller	0
(Czech Republic) Michal Ondo	4
(Scotland) Ross Montgomery	3
(Slovenia) Damjan Pilinger	1
(Norway) Rune David	4
(Northern Ireland) Darren Clifford	0
(Romania) Vlad-Christian Popa	4
(Serbia) Tihomir Patrik	2
(Denmark) Stig Jorgensen	4
(Switzerland) Reto Sigrist	0
(England) Martin Adams	4
(Scotland) Alan Soutar
Bye
(Lithuania) Arūnas Čiplys	3
(Slovenia) Andrej Gorjak	4
(England) Scott Waites	4
(Austria) Stefan Kuntner	0
(Spain) Kas van Golde	0
(Republic of Ireland) Jason Cullen	4
(Czech Republic) Jiri Jenicek	1
(Italy) Alessandro Colnaghi	4
(Belgium) Ronny Huybrechts	1
(Turkey) Eser Tekin	4
(Luxembourg) Mingo Claudiano	0
(Northern Ireland) Daryl Gurney	4
(Romania) Ravzan Negot	1
(Russia) Aleksei Kadochnikov	4
(Bulgaria) Ivan Neykov	3
(Catalonia) Daniel Zapata	4
(Wales) Jonny Clayton	4
(Poland) Patryk Zabka	3
(Denmark) Vladimir Andersen	4
(Switzerland) Christoph Kappeler	0
(Iceland) Hallgrimur Egilsson	1
(Netherlands) Jan Dekker	4
(Norway) Robert Hansen	4
(Serbia) Ljubomir Krkljes	2
(Jersey) Phil Speak	1
(Finland) Jani Haavisto	4
(France) Renaud Lescure	3
(Germany) Benjamin Sensenschmidt	4
(Sweden) Johan Engström
Bye
(Finland) Jarkko Komula
Bye	4
(England) Tony O'Shea	4
(Catalonia) Xavier Pla	2
(Austria) Christoph Kleindienst	1
(Denmark) Frede Johansen	4
(Bulgaria) Nikolai Krustev	2
(Turkey) Emre Toros	4
(Republic of Ireland) Stephen McDonnell	2
(Belgium) Donnie Michels	4
(Wales) Wayne Warren	3
(Czech Republic) Filip Slavik	4
(Romania) Cristian Cimpoca	3
(Scotland) Craig Baxter	4
(Poland) Krzysztof Wojciechowski	4
(Russia) Maksim Evmenenkov	0
(Iceland) Gudmundur Fridbjörnsson	0
(Northern Ireland) David Glenn	4
(Luxembourg) Steven Miles	4
(Serbia) Milan Stankovic	3
(Sweden) Lennart Efraimsson	4
(Jersey) Dave Moore	0
(Germany) Olaf Tupuschis	4
(Slovenia) Joze Vautar	3
(Switzerland) Thomas Bremgartner	4
(Lithuania) Gintaras Nagevius	2
(Spain) David Rogers	0
(Norway) Vegar Elvevoll	4
(France) Martin Goodin	2
(Italy) Loris Polese	4
(Netherlands) Christian Kist
Bye

2nd Round (best of 7 legs)
(Wales) David Smith-Hayes	0
(Belgium) Geert De Vos	4
(Northern Ireland) Roy Baillie	4
(Turkey) Kagan Aytek	0
(Serbia) Oliver Ferenc	4
(Republic of Ireland) Terry McNulty	1
(Denmark) Glenn Honore	0
(Scotland) Gary Stone	4
(Italy) Daniele Sergi	4
(Russia) Boris Koltsov	3
(Netherlands) Wesley Harms	4
(Poland) Krzysztof Strozyk	2
(England) Martin Atkins	4
(Czech Republic) Martin Popelka	0
(Slovenia) Sasa Vutek	2
(Norway) Øyvind Aasland	4
(Republic of Ireland) Sean McGowan	4
(Netherlands) Benito van de Pas	0
(Finland) Ulf Ceder	4
(Belgium) Davyd Venken	3
(Lithuania) Tomas Sakys	3
(Russia) Roman Obukhov	4
(Switzerland) Daniel van Allmen	0
(Wales) Martin Phillips	4
(Germany) Marko Puls	4
(Sweden) Mats Andersson	1
(France) Nicolas Thuillier	4
(Czech Republic) Michal Ondo	2
(Norway) Rune David	4
(Romania) Vlad-Christian Popa	1
(Denmark) Stig Jorgensen	4
(England) Martin Adams	3
(Scotland) Alan Soutar	4
(Slovenia) Andrej Gorjak	0
(England) Scott Waites	2
(Republic of Ireland) Jason Cullen	4
(Italy) Alessandro Colnaghi	2
(Turkey) Eser Tekin	4
(Northern Ireland) Daryl Gurney	4
(Russia) Aleksei Kadochnikov	3
(Catalonia) Daniel Zapata	1
(Wales) Jonny Clayton	4
(Denmark) Vladimir Andersen	1
(Netherlands) Jan Dekker	4
(Norway) Robert Hansen	1
(Finland) Jani Haavisto	4
(Germany) Benjamin Sensenschmidt	2
(Sweden) Johan Engström	4
(Finland) Jarkko Komula	4
(England) Tony O'Shea	1
(Denmark) Frede Johansen	4
(Turkey) Emre Toros	0
(Belgium) Donnie Michels	4
(Czech Republic) Filip Slavik	0
(Scotland) Craig Baxter	4
(Poland) Krzysztof Wojciechowski	3
(Northern Ireland) David Glenn	4
(Luxembourg) Steven Miles	2
(Sweden) Lennart Efraimsson	4
(Germany) Olaf Tupuschis	2
(Switzerland) Thomas Bremgartner	4
(Norway) Vegar Elvevoll	2
(Italy) Loris Polese	2
(Netherlands) Christian Kist	4

3rd Round (best of 7 legs)
(Belgium) Geert De Vos	3
(Northern Ireland) Roy Baillie	4
(Serbia) Oliver Ferenc	2
(Scotland) Gary Stone	4
(Italy) Daniele Sergi	2
(Netherlands) Wesley Harms	4
(England) Martin Atkins	4
(Norway) Øyvind Aasland	1
(Republic of Ireland) Sean McGowan	2
(Finland) Ulf Ceder	4
(Russia) Roman Obukhov	4
(Wales) Martin Phillips	3
(Germany) Marko Puls	3
(France) Nicolas Thuillier	4
(Norway) Rune David	4
(Denmark) Stig Jorgensen	2
(Scotland) Alan Soutar	4
(Republic of Ireland) Jason Cullen	1
(Turkey) Eser Tekin	2
(Northern Ireland) Daryl Gurney	4
(Wales) Jonny Clayton	4
(Netherlands) Jan Dekker	3
(Finland) Jani Haavisto	4
(Sweden) Johan Engström	3
(Finland) Jarkko Komula	4
(Denmark) Frede Johansen	3
(Belgium) Donnie Michels	2
(Scotland) Craig Baxter	4
(Wales) David Glenn	2
(Sweden) Lennart Efraimsson	4
(Switzerland) Thomas Bremgartner	0
(Netherlands) Christian Kist	4

4th Round (best of 7 legs)
(Northern Ireland) Roy Baillie	3
(Scotland) Gary Stone	4
(Netherlands) Wesley Harms	2
(England) Martin Atkins	4
(Finland) Ulf Ceder	4
(Russia) Roman Obukhov	1
(France) Nicolas Thuillier	0
(Norway) Rune David	4
(Scotland) Alan Soutar	4
(Northern Ireland) Daryl Gurney	0
(Wales) Jonny Clayton	4
(Finland) Jani Haavisto	3
(Finland) Jarkko Komula	4
(Scotland) Craig Baxter	2
(Sweden) Lennart Efraimsson	0
(Netherlands) Christian Kist	4

Quarter-finals (best of 9 legs)
(Scotland) Gary Stone	5
(England) Martin Atkins	2
(Finland) Ulf Ceder	5
(Norway) Rune David	2
(Scotland) Alan Soutar	0
(Wales) Jonny Clayton	5
(Finland) Jarkko Komula	4
(Netherlands) Christian Kist	5

Semi-finals (best of 11 legs)
(Scotland) Gary Stone	6
(Finland) Ulf Ceder	3
Final (best of 13 legs)
(Scotland) Gary Stone	7
(Netherlands) Christian Kist	4
(Wales) Jonny Clayton	2
(Netherlands) Christian Kist	6

== Men's pairs ==
1st Round (best of 7 legs)
(England) Martin Adams (England) Martin Atkins	4
(Gibraltar) George Federico (Gibraltar) Manuel Vilerio	1
(Spain) Leonard Pitman (Spain) David Rogers	4
(Jersey) Steve Eusebini (Jersey) Eddie Le Bailly-snr	1
(Catalonia) Pere Grau (Catalonia) Xavier Pla	1
(Switzerland) Christoph Kappeler (Switzerland) Daniel Van Allmen	4
(Iceland) Hallgrimur Egilsson (Iceland) Einar Moller	1
(Republic of Ireland) Jason Cullen (Republic of Ireland) Stephen McDonnell	4
(Sweden) Daniel Larsson (Sweden) Johan Engström	4
(Germany) Benjamin Sensenschmidt (Germany) Marko Puls	0
(Denmark) Frede Johansen (Denmark) Vladimir Andersen	1
(Norway) Robert Hansen (Norway) Rune David	4
(Slovenia) Damjan Pilinger (Slovenia) Sasa Vutek	1
(Lithuania) Darius Labanauskas (Lithuania) Arūnas Čiplys	4
(Russia) Maksim Evmenenkov (Russia) Boris Koltsov	2
(Poland) Krzysztof Wojciechowski (Poland) Przemyslaw Bobrowski	4
(Belgium) Ronny Huybrechts (Belgium) Geert De Vos	4
(France) Thibault Tricole (France) Renaud Lescure	0
(Romania) Vlad-Christian Popa (Romania) Cristian Cimpoca	1
(Netherlands) Benito van de Pas (Netherlands) Wesley Harms	4
(Turkey) Engin Kayaoglu (Turkey) Eser Tekin	4
(Italy) Gianluca Grillini (Italy) Alessandro Colnaghi	0
(Scotland) Gary Stone (Scotland) Craig Baxter	4
(Austria) Stefan Kuntner (Austria) Philip Karall	0
(Finland) Jarkko Komula (Finland) Ulf Ceder	4
(Luxembourg) Steven Miles (Luxembourg) Mingo Claudiano	3
(Northern Ireland) Darren Clifford (Northern Ireland) Roy Baillie	1
(Serbia) Oliver Ferenc (Serbia) Milan Stankovic	4
(Bulgaria) Nikolai Krustev (Bulgaria) Ivan Neykov	4
(Czech Republic) Michal Ondo (Czech Republic) Martin Popelka	2
(Wales) David Smith-Hayes (Wales) Jonny Clayton
Bye
(Northern Ireland) David Glenn (Northern Ireland) Daryl Gurney	4
(Gibraltar) Dyson Parody (Gibraltar) Dylan Duo	0
(Wales) Wayne Warren (Wales) Martin Phillips	4
(Lithuania) Tomas Sakys (Lithuania) Gintaras Nagevius	1
(Serbia) Tihomir Patrik (Serbia) Ljubomir Krkljes	4
(Jersey) Dave Moore (Jersey) Phil Speak	1
(Italy) Daniele Sergi (Italy) Loris Polese	1
(Germany) Olaf Tupuschis (Germany) Colin Rice	4
(Romania) Adrian Frim (Romania) Ravzan Negot	0
(England) Tony O'Shea (England) Scott Waites	4
(Switzerland) Thomas Bremgartner (Switzerland) Reto Sigrist	2
(Belgium) Davyd Venken (Belgium) Donnie Michels	4
(Denmark) Glenn Honore (Denmark) Stig Jorgensen	4
(Iceland) Hinrik Thordarson (Iceland) Gudmundur Sigurdsson	0
(Austria) Christoph Kleindienst (Austria) Christian Steindl	2
(Norway) Vegar Elvevoll (Norway) Øyvind Aasland	4
(France) Martin Goodin (France) Nicolas Thuillier	4
(Luxembourg) Joe Kieffer (Luxembourg) Tom Becker	1
(Turkey) Emre Toros (Turkey) Kagan Aytek	4
(Spain) Philip Stockton (Spain) Kas van Golde	3
(Russia) Aleksei Kadochnikov (Russia) Roman Obukhov	3
(Finland) Jani Haavisto (Finland) Kim Viljanen	4
(Catalonia) Daniel Zapata (Catalonia) Doroteo Bermudez	0
(Poland) Krzysztof Strozyk (Poland) Patryk Zabka	4
(Republic of Ireland) Sean McGowan (Republic of Ireland) Terry McNulty	4
(Bulgaria) Marin Marinov (Bulgaria) Krasimir Ivanov	3
(Slovenia) Joze Vautar (Slovenia) Andrej Gorjak	4
(Sweden) Mats Andersson (Sweden) Lennart Efraimsson	2
(Scotland) Alan Soutar (Scotland) Ross Montgomery	4
(Czech Republic) Filip Slavik (Czech Republic) Jiri Jenicek	0
(Netherlands) Christian Kist (Netherlands) Jan Dekker
Bye

2nd Round (best of 7 legs)
(England) Martin Adams (England) Martin Atkins	4
(Spain) Leonard Pitman (Spain) David Rogers	0
(Switzerland) Christoph Kappeler (Switzerland) Daniel Van Allmen	4
(Republic of Ireland) Jason Cullen (Republic of Ireland) Stephen McDonnell	1
(Sweden) Daniel Larsson (Sweden) Johan Engström	4
(Norway) Robert Hansen (Norway) Rune David	1
(Lithuania) Darius Labanauskas (Lithuania) Arūnas Čiplys	4
(Poland) Krzysztof Wojciechowski (Poland) Przemyslaw Bobrowski	3
(Belgium) Ronny Huybrechts (Belgium) Geert De Vos	4
(Netherlands) Benito van de Pas (Netherlands) Wesley Harms	2
(Turkey) Engin Kayaoglu (Turkey) Eser Tekin	4
(Scotland) Gary Stone (Scotland) Craig Baxter	2
(Finland) Jarkko Komula (Finland) Ulf Ceder	4
(Serbia) Oliver Ferenc (Serbia) Milan Stankovic	1
(Bulgaria) Nikolai Krustev (Bulgaria) Ivan Neykov	1
(Wales) David Smith-Hayes (Wales) Jonny Clayton	4
(Northern Ireland) David Glenn (Northern Ireland) Daryl Gurney	4
(Wales) Wayne Warren (Wales) Martin Phillips	1
(Serbia) Tihomir Patrik (Serbia) Ljubomir Krkljes	0
(Germany) Olaf Tupuschis (Germany) Colin Rice	4
(England) Tony O'Shea (England) Scott Waites	1
(Belgium) Davyd Venken (Belgium) Donnie Michels	4
(Denmark) Glenn Honore (Denmark) Stig Jorgensen	4
(Norway) Vegar Elvevoll (Norway) Øyvind Aasland	0
(France) Martin Goodin (France) Nicolas Thuillier	4
(Turkey) Emre Toros (Turkey) Kagan Aytek	3
(Finland) Jani Haavisto (Finland) Kim Viljanen	4
(Poland) Krzysztof Strozyk (Poland) Patryk Zabka	2
(Republic of Ireland) Sean McGowan (Republic of Ireland) Terry McNulty	3
(Slovenia) Joze Vautar (Slovenia) Andrej Gorjak	4
(Scotland) Alan Soutar (Scotland) Ross Montgomery	1
(Netherlands) Christian Kist (Netherlands) Jan Dekker	4

3rd Round (best of 7 legs)
(England) Martin Adams (England) Martin Atkins	4
(Switzerland) Christoph Kappeler (Switzerland) Daniel Van Allmen	1
(Sweden) Daniel Larsson (Sweden) Johan Engström	3
(Lithuania) Darius Labanauskas (Lithuania) Arūnas Čiplys	4
(Belgium) Ronny Huybrechts (Belgium) Geert De Vos	4
(Turkey) Engin Kayaoglu (Turkey) Eser Tekin	3
(Finland) Jarkko Komula (Finland) Ulf Ceder	2
(Wales) David Smith-Hayes (Wales) Jonny Clayton	4
(Northern Ireland) David Glenn (Northern Ireland) Daryl Gurney	4
(Germany) Olaf Tupuschis (Germany) Colin Rice	0
(Belgium) Davyd Venken (Belgium) Donnie Michels	4
(Denmark) Glenn Honore (Denmark) Stig Jorgensen	2
(France) Martin Goodin (France) Nicolas Thuillier	3
(Finland) Jani Haavisto (Finland) Kim Viljanen	4
(Slovenia) Joze Vautar (Slovenia) Andrej Gorjak	0
(Netherlands) Christian Kist (Netherlands) Jan Dekker	4

Quarter-finals (best of 7 legs)
(England) Martin Adams (England) Martin Atkins	3
(Lithuania) Darius Labanauskas (Lithuania) Arūnas Čiplys	4
(Belgium) Ronny Huybrechts (Belgium) Geert De Vos	4
(Wales) David Smith-Hayes (Wales) Jonny Clayton	3
(Northern Ireland) David Glenn (Northern Ireland) Daryl Gurney	3
(Belgium) Davyd Venken (Belgium) Donnie Michels	4
(Finland) Jani Haavisto (Finland) Kim Viljanen	2
(Netherlands) Christian Kist (Netherlands) Jan Dekker	4

Semi-finals (best of 9 legs)
(Lithuania) Darius Labanauskas (Lithuania) Arūnas Čiplys	5
(Belgium) Ronny Huybrechts (Belgium) Geert De Vos	3
(Belgium) Davyd Venken (Belgium) Donnie Michels	4
(Netherlands) Christian Kist (Netherlands) Jan Dekker	5

Final (best of 11 legs)
(Lithuania) Darius Labanauskas (Lithuania) Arūnas Čiplys	0
(Netherlands) Christian Kist (Netherlands) Jan Dekker	6

== Men's team ==
Round Robin

Group A

Pos	Team	Pld	Win	Lose	LF	LA	+/−
1	Belgium	2	2	0	18	8	+10
2	Turkey	2	1	1	14	12	+2
3	Austria	2	0	2	6	18	−12

- Belgium 9 – 5 Turkey
- Belgium 9 – 3 Austria
- Turkey 9 – 3 Austria

Group B

Pos	Team	Pld	Win	Lose	LF	LA	+/−
1	Ireland	3	3	0	27	12	+15
2	Denmark	3	2	1	24	13	+11
3	Bulgaria	3	1	2	11	21	−10
4	Serbia	3	0	3	11	27	−16

- Ireland 9 – 6 Denmark
- Ireland 9 – 1 Bulgaria
- Ireland 9 – 5 Serbia
- Denmark 9 – 1 Bulgaria
- Denmark 9 – 3 Serbia
- Bulgaria 9 – 3 Serbia

Group C

Pos	Team	Pld	Win	Lose	LF	LA	+/−
1	England	3	3	0	27	5	+22
2	Switzerland	3	2	1	19	24	−5
3	Russia	2	0	2	11	18	−7
4	Romania	2	0	2	8	18	−10

- England 9 – 1 Switzerland
- England 9 – 3 Russia
- England 9 – 1 Romania
- Switzerland 9 – 8 Russia
- Switzerland 9 – 7 Romania
- Russia 0 – 0 Romania

Group D

Pos	Team	Pld	Win	Lose	LF	LA	+/−
1	Poland	3	3	0	27	12	+15
2	Norway	3	2	1	26	20	+6
3	Czech Republic	3	1	2	18	23	−5
4	Iceland	3	0	3	11	27	−16

- Poland 9 – 8 Norway
- Poland 9 – 2 Czech Republic
- Poland 9 – 2 Iceland
- Norway 9 – 7 Czech Republic
- Norway 9 – 4 Iceland
- Czech Republic 9 – 5 Iceland

Group E

Pos	Team	Pld	Win	Lose	LF	LA	+/−
1	Sweden	3	3	0	27	10	+17
2	Germany	3	2	1	23	18	+5
3	Jersey	3	1	2	16	25	−9
4	Catalonia	3	0	3	14	27	−13

- Sweden 9 – 5 Germany
- Sweden 9 – 3 Jersey
- Sweden 9 – 2 Catalonia
- Germany 9 – 4 Jersey
- Germany 9 – 5 Catalonia
- Jersey 9 – 7 Catalonia

Group F

Pos	Team	Pld	Win	Lose	LF	LA	+/−
1	Wales	3	3	0	27	10	+17
2	Lithuania	3	1	2	24	23	+1
3	Luxembourg	3	1	2	16	21	−5
4	France	3	1	2	13	26	−13

- Wales 9 – 7 Lithuania
- Wales 9 – 2 Luxembourg
- Wales 9 – 1 France
- Lithuania 9 – 5 Luxembourg
- Luxembourg 9 – 3 France
- France 9 – 8 Lithuania

Group G

Pos	Team	Pld	Win	Lose	LF	LA	+/−
1	Scotland	3	3	0	27	8	+19
2	Finland	3	2	1	25	16	+9
3	Italy	3	1	2	16	23	−7
4	Slovenia	3	0	3	6	27	−21

- Scotland 9 – 7 Finland
- Scotland 9 – 1 Italy
- Scotland 9 – 0 Slovenia
- Finland 9 – 6 Italy
- Finland 9 – 1 Slovenia
- Italy 9 – 5 Slovenia

Group H

Pos	Team	Pld	Win	Lose	LF	LA	+/−
1	Netherlands	2	2	0	18	4	+14
2	Northern Ireland	2	1	1	13	12	+1
3	Spain	2	0	2	3	18	−15

- Netherlands 9 – 4 Northern Ireland
- Netherlands 9 – 0 Spain
- Northern Ireland 9 – 3 Spain

Knock Out

Last 16 (best of 17 legs)
A1	Belgium	9
G2	Finland	2
B1	Ireland	6
H2	Northern Ireland	9
C1	England	9
E2	Germany	3
D1	Poland	9
F2	Lithuania	3
E1	Sweden	9
C2	Switzerland	2
F1	Wales	9
D2	Norway	6
G1	Scotland	9
A2	Turkey	6
H1	Netherlands	9
B2	Denmark	7

Quarter-finals (best of 17 legs)
A1	Belgium	9
H2	Northern Ireland	3
C1	England	9
D1	Poland	3
E1	Sweden	5
F1	Wales	9
G1	Scotland	7
H1	Netherlands	9

Semi-finals (best of 17 legs)
A1	Belgium	4
C1	England	9
F1	Wales	6
H1	Netherlands	9

Final (best of 17 legs)
C1	England	7
H1	Netherlands	9

== Women's singles ==
1st Round (best of 7 legs)
(Netherlands) Karin Krappen
Bye
(Italy) Giada Ciofi	0
(Wales) Julie Gore	4
(Romania) Oana-Diana Birsan	2
(Republic of Ireland) Caroline Breen	4
(Sweden) Kristin Bomander	1
(Germany) Irina Armstrong	4
(Austria) Petra Hristovski
Bye
(Norway) Rachna David	4
(Lithuania) Erika Bagdonaviciene	0
(Bulgaria) Kunka Ivanova	4
(France) Laure Schweitzer	3
(Belgium) Patricia De Peuter
Bye
(Finland) Kirsi Viinikainen
Bye
(Czech Republic) Radana Jandova	2
(Iceland) Petrea Fridriksdottir	4
(Poland) Jolanta Rzepka	4
(Turkey) Cagla-Pinar Utkutug	3
(England) Deta Hedman	4
(Slovenia) Viktorija Klanecek	0
(Switzerland) Jeannette Stoop	4
(Spain) Christine Hunt	2
(Catalonia) Iolanda Riba	0
(Scotland) Susanna Young	4
(Denmark) Charlotte Pedersen	4
(Serbia) Sanja Andjelkovic	0
(Northern Ireland) Grace Crane
Bye
(Wales) Rhian Edwards
Bye
(Bulgaria) Anelia Eneva	4
(Romania) Oana Nutu	2
(Spain) Paula Smith	0
(France) Sandrine Valverde	4
(Slovenia) Gustin Blanka	0
(Czech Republic) Iveta Bruska	4
(Turkey) Sedra Uzunca
Bye
(Italy) Barbara Osti	4
(Iceland) Sigridur-Gudrun Jonsdottir	0
(Northern Ireland) Nicole Dillon	4
(Republic of Ireland) Angela De Ward	2
(Scotland) Louise Hepburn
Bye
(Sweden) Maud Jansson
Bye
(Austria) Karin Jahn	0
(Belgium) Joyce Janssens	4
(Norway) Hege Løkken	2
(Catalonia) Laura Damont	4
(Poland) Aleksandra Grzesik	4
(Lithuania) Renata Vaikutiene	0
(Netherlands) Tamara Schuur	4
(Serbia) Djurdina Miskovic	1
(Germany) Heike Ernst	4
(Finland) Lumi Silvan	2
(Switzerland) Colette Rudin	4
(Denmark) Janni Larsen	1
(England) Trina Gulliver
Bye

2nd Round (best of 7 legs)
(Netherlands) Karin Krappen	3
(Wales) Julie Gore	4
(Republic of Ireland) Caroline Breen	1
(Germany) Irina Armstrong	4
(Austria) Petra Hristovski	4
(Norway) Rachna David	0
(Bulgaria) Kunka Ivanova	2
(Belgium) Patricia De Peuter	4
(Finland) Kirsi Viinikainen	4
(Iceland) Petrea Fridriksdottir	0
(Poland) Jolanta Rzepka	0
(England) Deta Hedman	4
(Switzerland) Jeannette Stoop	4
(Scotland) Susanna Young	2
(Denmark) Charlotte Pedersen	1
(Northern Ireland) Grace Crane	4
(Wales) Rhian Edwards	2
(Bulgaria) Anelia Eneva	4
(France) Sandrine Valverde	0
(Czech Republic) Iveta Bruska	4
(Turkey) Sedra Uzunca	4
(Italy) Barbara Osti	2
(Northern Ireland) Nicole Dillon	3
(Scotland) Louise Hepburn	4
(Sweden) Maud Jansson	3
(Belgium) Joyce Janssens	4
(Catalonia) Laura Damont	4
(Poland) Aleksandra Grzesik	1
(Netherlands) Tamara Schuur	4
(Germany) Heike Ernst	1
(Switzerland) Colette Rudin	2
(England) Trina Gulliver	4

3rd Round (best of 7 legs)
(Wales) Julie Gore	4
(Germany) Irina Armstrong	3
(Norway) Rachna David	1
(Belgium) Patricia De Peuter	4
(Finland) Kirsi Viinikainen	4
(England) Deta Hedman	3
(Switzerland) Jeannette Stoop	4
(Northern Ireland) Grace Crane	1
(Bulgaria) Anelia Eneva	3
(Czech Republic) Iveta Bruska	4
(Turkey) Sedra Uzunca	1
(Scotland) Louise Hepburn	4
(Belgium) Joyce Janssens	0
(Catalonia) Laura Damont	4
(Netherlands) Tamara Schuur	3
(England) Trina Gulliver	4

Quarter-finals (best of 9 legs)
(Wales) Julie Gore	4
(Belgium) Patricia De Peuter	5
(Finland) Kirsi Viinikainen	4
(Switzerland) Jeannette Stoop	5
(Czech Republic) Iveta Bruska	1
(Scotland) Louise Hepburn	5
(Catalonia) Laura Damont	1
(England) Trina Gulliver	5

Semi-finals (best of 11 legs)
(Belgium) Patricia De Peuter	6
(Switzerland) Jeannette Stoop	3
(Scotland) Louise Hepburn	2
(England) Trina Gulliver	6

Final (best of 13 legs)
(Belgium) Patricia De Peuter	7
(England) Trina Gulliver	6

== Women's pairs ==
Round Robin

Group A

Pos	Team	Pld	Win	Lose	LF	LA	+/−
1	(Switzerland) Jeannette Stoop (Switzerland) Colette Rudin	2	1	1	6	5	+1
2	(Wales) Julie Gore (Wales) Rhian Edwards	2	1	1	5	5	0
3	(Czech Republic) Radana Jandova (Czech Republic) Iveta Bruska	2	1	1	5	6	−1

- (Switzerland) Jeannette Stoop & Colette Rudin 4 – 1 (Wales) Julie Gore & Rhian Edwards
- (Wales) Julie Gore & Rhian Edwards 4 – 1 (Czech Republic) Radana Jandova & Iveta Bruska
- (Czech Republic) Radana Jandova & Iveta Bruska 4 – 2 (Switzerland) Jeannette Stoop & Colette Rudin

Group B

Pos	Team	Pld	Win	Lose	LF	LA	+/−
1	(Scotland) Susanna Young (Scotland) Louise Hepburn	3	3	0	12	2	+10
2	(Serbia) Sanja Andjelkovic (Serbia) Djurdjina Miscevic	3	2	1	8	7	+1
3	(Spain) Paula Smith (Spain) Christine Hunt	3	1	2	8	11	−2
4	(Lithuania) Erika Bagdonaviciene (Lithuania) Renata Vaikutiene	3	0	3	3	12	−9

- (Scotland) Susanna Young & Louise Hepburn 4 – 0 (Serbia) Sanja Andjelkovic & Djurdjina Miscevic
- (Scotland) Susanna Young & Louise Hepburn 4 – 2 (Spain) Paula Smith & Christine Hunt
- (Scotland) Susanna Young & Louise Hepburn 4 – 0 (Lithuania) Erika Bagdonaviciene & Renata Vaikutiene
- (Serbia) Sanja Andjelkovic & Djurdjina Miscevic 4 – 3 (Spain) Paula Smith & Christine Hunt
- (Serbia) Sanja Andjelkovic & Djurdjina Miscevic 4 – 0 (Lithuania) Erika Bagdonaviciene & Renata Vaikutiene
- (Spain) Paula Smith & Christine Hunt 4 – 3 (Lithuania) Erika Bagdonaviciene & Renata Vaikutiene

Group C

Pos	Team	Pld	Win	Lose	LF	LA	+/−
1	(Netherlands) Tamara Schuur (Netherlands) Karin Krappen	2	2	0	8	2	+6
2	(Denmark) Janni Larsen (Denmark) Charlotte Pedersen	2	1	1	6	4	+2
3	(Austria) Karin Jahn (Austria) Petra Hristovski	2	0	2	0	8	−8

- (Netherlands) Tamara Schuur & Karin Krappen 4 – 2 (Denmark) Janni Larsen & Charlotte Pedersen
- (Netherlands) Tamara Schuur & Karin Krappen 4 – 0 (Austria) Karin Jahn & Petra Hristovski
- (Denmark) Janni Larsen & Charlotte Pedersen 4 – 0 (Austria) Karin Jahn & Petra Hristovski

Group D

Pos	Team	Pld	Win	Lose	LF	LA	+/−
1	(Northern Ireland) Grace Crane (Northern Ireland) Nicole Dillon	2	2	0	8	3	+5
2	(Belgium) Patricia De Peuter (Belgium) Joyce Janssens	2	1	1	7	4	+3
3	(Romania) Oana-Diana Birsan (Romania) Oana Nutu	2	0	2	0	8	−8

- (Northern Ireland) Grace Crane & Nicole Dillon 4 – 3 (Belgium) Patricia De Peuter & Joyce Janssens
- (Northern Ireland) Grace Crane & Nicole Dillon 4 – 0 (Romania) Oana-Diana Birsan & Oana Nutu
- (Belgium) Patricia De Peuter & Joyce Janssens 4 – 0 (Romania) Oana-Diana Birsan & Oana Nutu

Group E

Pos	Team	Pld	Win	Lose	LF	LA	+/−
1	(England) Trina Gulliver (England) Deta Hedman	2	2	0	8	1	+7
2	(Italy) Barbara Osti (Italy) Giada Ciofi	2	1	1	5	7	−2
3	(Turkey) Cagla-Pinar Utkutug (Turkey) Sedra Uzunca	2	0	2	3	8	−5

- (England) Trina Gulliver & Deta Hedman 4 – 1 (Italy) Barbara Osti & Giada Ciofi
- (England) Trina Gulliver & Deta Hedman 4 – 0 (Turkey) Cagla-Pinar Utkutug & Sedra Uzunca
- (Italy) Barbara Osti & Giada Ciofi 4 – 3 (Turkey) Cagla-Pinar Utkutug & Sedra Uzunca

Group F

Pos	Team	Pld	Win	Lose	LF	LA	+/−
1	(Norway) Rachna David (Norway) Hege Løkken	3	3	0	12	1	+11
2	(Finland) Lumi Silvan (Finland) Kirsi Viinikainen	3	2	1	9	6	+3
3	(Iceland) Sigridur-Gudrun Jonsdottir (Iceland) Petrea Fridriksdottir	3	1	2	6	10	−4
4	(Slovenia) Gustin Blanka (Slovenia) Viktorija Klanecek	3	0	3	2	12	−10

- (Norway) Rachna David & Hege Løkken 4 – 1 (Finland) Lumi Silvan & Kirsi Viinikainen
- (Norway) Rachna David & Hege Løkken 4 – 0 (Iceland) Sigridur-Gudrun Jonsdottir & Petrea Fridriksdottir
- (Norway) Rachna David & Hege Løkken 4 – 0 (Slovenia) Gustin Blanka & Viktorija Klanecek
- (Finland) Lumi Silvan & Kirsi Viinikainen 4 – 2 (Iceland) Sigridur-Gudrun Jonsdottir & Petrea Fridriksdottir
- (Finland) Lumi Silvan & Kirsi Viinikainen 4 – 0 (Slovenia) Gustin Blanka & Viktorija Klanecek
- (Iceland) Sigridur-Gudrun Jonsdottir & Petrea Fridriksdottir 4 – 2 (Slovenia) Gustin Blanka & Viktorija Klanecek

Group G

Pos	Team	Pld	Win	Lose	LF	LA	+/−
1	(Germany) Heike Ernst (Germany) Irina Armstrong	3	3	0	12	2	+10
2	(Sweden) Kristin Bomander (Sweden) Maud Jansson	3	2	1	8	5	+3
3	(Poland) Jolanta Rzepka (Poland) Aleksandra Grzesik	3	1	2	7	11	−4
4	(France) Sandrine Valverde (France) Laure Schweitzer	3	0	3	3	12	−9

- (Germany) Heike Ernst & Irina Armstrong 4 – 0 (Sweden) Kristin Bomander & Maud Jansson
- (Germany) Heike Ernst & Irina Armstrong 4 – 2 (Poland) Jolanta Rzepka & Aleksandra Grzesik
- (Germany) Heike Ernst & Irina Armstrong 4 – 0 (France) Sandrine Valverde & Laure Schweitzer
- (Sweden) Kristin Bomander & Maud Jansson 4 – 1 (Poland) Jolanta Rzepka & Aleksandra Grzesik
- (Sweden) Kristin Bomander & Maud Jansson 4 – 0 (France) Sandrine Valverde & Laure Schweitzer
- (Poland) Jolanta Rzepka & Aleksandra Grzesik 4 – 3 (France) Sandrine Valverde & Laure Schweitzer

Group H

Pos	Team	Pld	Win	Lose	LF	LA	+/−
1	(Republic of Ireland) Caroline Breen (Republic of Ireland) Angela De Ward	2	2	0	8	1	+7
2	(Catalonia) Iolanda Riba (Catalonia) Laura Damont	2	1	1	5	6	−1
3	(Bulgaria) Kunka Ivanova (Bulgaria) Anelia Eneva	2	0	2	2	8	−6

- (Republic of Ireland) Caroline Breen & Angela De Ward 4 – 1 (Catalonia) Iolanda Riba & Laura Damont
- (Republic of Ireland) Caroline Breen & Angela De Ward 4 – 0 (Bulgaria) Kunka Ivanova & Anelia Eneva
- (Catalonia) Iolanda Riba & Laura Damont 4 – 2 (Bulgaria) Kunka Ivanova & Anelia Eneva

Knock Out

Last 16 (best of 7 legs)
A1	(Switzerland) Jeannette Stoop (Switzerland) Colette Rudin	2
G2	(Sweden) Kristin Bomander (Sweden) Maud Jansson	4
B1	(Scotland) Susanna Young (Scotland) Louise Hepburn	4
H2	(Catalonia) Iolanda Riba (Catalonia) Laura Damont	1
C1	(Netherlands) Tamara Schuur (Netherlands) Karin Krappen	4
E2	(Italy) Barbara Osti (Italy) Giada Ciofi	0
D1	(Northern Ireland) Grace Crane (Northern Ireland) Nicole Dillon	4
F2	(Finland) Lumi Silvan (Finland) Kirsi Viinikainen	2
E1	(England) Trina Gulliver (England) Deta Hedman	4
C2	(Denmark) Janni Larsen (Denmark) Charlotte Pedersen	0
F1	(Norway) Rachna David (Norway) Hege Løkken	4
D2	(Belgium) Patricia De Peuter (Belgium) Joyce Janssens	3
G1	(Germany) Heike Ernst (Germany) Irina Armstrong	2
A2	(Wales) Julie Gore (Wales) Rhian Edwards	4
H1	(Republic of Ireland) Caroline Breen (Republic of Ireland) Angela De Ward	4
B2	(Serbia) Sanja Andjelkovic (Serbia) Djurdjina Miscevic	3

Quarter-finals (best of 7 legs)
G2	(Sweden) Kristin Bomander (Sweden) Maud Jansson	0
B1	(Scotland) Susanna Young (Scotland) Louise Hepburn	4
C1	(Netherlands) Tamara Schuur (Netherlands) Karin Krappen	4
D1	(Northern Ireland) Grace Crane (Northern Ireland) Nicole Dillon	3
E1	(England) Trina Gulliver (England) Deta Hedman	4
F1	(Norway) Rachna David (Norway) Hege Løkken	1
A2	(Wales) Julie Gore (Wales) Rhian Edwards	4
H1	(Republic of Ireland) Caroline Breen (Republic of Ireland) Angela De Ward	2

Semi-finals (best of 9 legs)
B1	(Scotland) Susanna Young (Scotland) Louise Hepburn	1
C1	(Netherlands) Tamara Schuur (Netherlands) Karin Krappen	5
E1	(England) Trina Gulliver (England) Deta Hedman	3
A2	(Wales) Julie Gore (Wales) Rhian Edwards	5

Final (best of 11 legs)
C1	(Netherlands) Tamara Schuur (Netherlands) Karin Krappen	6
A2	(Wales) Julie Gore (Wales) Rhian Edwards	3
