= FCD Anniversary Open =

Tournament information
- Venue: Fábrica Llobet Gurí
- Location: Calella
- Country: Spain
- Established: 2015
- Organisation(s): WDF
- Format: Legs
- Prize fund: €3,400
- Month(s) Played: September

Current champion(s)
- Timothy Verbrugghe (men's); Paula Jacklin (women's)

The FCD Anniversary Open is a darts tournament held in Calella, Catalunya. It has been held since 2015 when the Federació Catalana de Dards celebrated the 25th anniversary of its foundation. Always been held on Calella the same weekenend of Catalonia Open Darts.

This competicion is organizate by Federació Catalana de Dards (FCD) and is ranked for World Darts Federation (WDF) and British Darts Organisation (BDO).

In 2020 the competition was canceled due to the Covid-19 pandemic

== List of winners ==
=== Men's ===
Year	Champion	Av.	Score	Runner-up	Av.	Prize Money			Venue
Year	Champion	Av.	Score	Runner-up	Av.	Total	Ch.	R.-Up	Venue
2015	Kevin Simm	90.25	6–5	Oliver Ferenc	84.55	€2,340	€1,000	€400	Fábrica Llobet Gurí, Calella
2016	José de Sousa	n/a	6–2	Willem Mandigers	n/a	€2,000	€900	€300	Fábrica Llobet Gurí, Calella
2017	Martín Martí	n/a	6–4	Kay Smeets	n/a	€2,000	€900	€300	Fábrica Llobet Gurí, Calella
2018	Kay Smeets	86.91	6–2	Ian Jolly	75.68	€2,000	€900	€300	Fábrica Llobet Gurí, Calella
2019	Carles Arola	86.43	6–3	Kay Smeets	86.82	€2,000	€900	€300	Fábrica Llobet Gurí, Calella
2021	Andy Baetens	n/a	5–1	Daniel Zapata	n/a	€2,000	€900	€300	Fábrica Llobet Gurí, Calella
2022	Shane McGuirk	n/a	5–4	Andy Baetens	n/a	€2,400	€800	€400	Fábrica Llobet Gurí, Calella
2023	Jelle Klaasen	n/a	5–1	Matthew Edgar	n/a	€2,400	€800	€400	Fábrica Llobet Gurí, Calella
2024	Daniel Zapata	86.02	5–2	Patrick Peters	82.17	€2,400	€800	€400	Fábrica Llobet Gurí, Calella
2025	José Justicia	83.50	5–0	Paul Millford	82.85	€2,400	€800	€400	
2026	Timothy Verbrugghe	89.88	5–1	Nick Fullwell	66.68	€2,400	€800	€400	
2027	.	.		.	.	€2,400	€800	€400	

=== Women's ===
Year	Champion	Av.	Score	Runner-up	Av.	Prize Money			Venue
Year	Champion	Av.	Score	Runner-up	Av.	Total	Ch.	R.-Up	Venue
2015	Sharon Prins	65.53	5–1	Els Verpoorten	51.60	€1,100	€500	€200	Fábrica Llobet Gurí, Calella
2016	Aileen de Graaf	78.23	5–1	Sharon Prins	70.23	€850	€400	€180	Fábrica Llobet Gurí, Calella
2017	Aileen de Graaf (2)	n/a	5–4	Sharon Prins	n/a	€850	€400	€180	Fábrica Llobet Gurí, Calella
2018	Sharon Prins (2)	78.70	5–2	Maud Jansson	71.89	€850	€400	€180	Fábrica Llobet Gurí, Calella
2019	Aileen de Graaf (3)	78.22	5–3	Sharon Prins	74.19	€850	€400	€180	Fábrica Llobet Gurí, Calella
2021	Aileen de Graaf (4)	n/a	4–1	Paula Jacklin	n/a	€850	€400	€180	Fábrica Llobet Gurí, Calella
2022	Maud Jansson	n/a	4–3	Anna Forsmark	n/a	€1,000	€400	€200	Fábrica Llobet Gurí, Calella
2023	Patricia De Peuter	n/a	4–1	Shana Van Nieuwenhoven	n/a	€1,000	€400	€200	Fábrica Llobet Gurí, Calella
2024	Gréta Tekauer	60.60	4–3	Priscilla Steenbergen	64.97	€1,000	€400	€200	Fábrica Llobet Gurí, Calella
2025	Lerena Rietbergen	81.84	4–0	Patricia de Peuter	66.00	€1,000	€400	€200	
2026	(England) Paula Jacklin	61.47	5 – 4	(Sweden) Anna Forsmark	57.55	€1,000	€400	€200	
2027		.			.	€1,000	€400	€200	
