= Patricia De Peuter =

Belgian darts player

Personal information
- Born: 23 April 1967 (age 59) Antwerp, Belgium
- Home town: Antwerp, Belgium

Sport
- Sport: Darts
- Laterality: Right-handed

Organisation (see split in darts)
- BDO: 2010–2020
- WDF: 2010–
- Current world ranking: (WDF W) NR (17 August 2026)

WDF major events – best performances
- World Championship: Quarter Final: 2011
- World Masters: Last 64: 2010

Other tournament wins
- Years
| Catalonia Open | 2022 |
Medal record
Women's Darts
Representing Belgium
WDF Europe Cup
| Gold medal – first place | 2012 Kemer | Women's singles |
| Bronze medal – third place | 2012 Kemer | Women's overall |
EDU European Darts Championship
| Silver medal – second place | 2010 Leukerbad | Women's cricket |
EDF European Darts Championship
| Gold medal – first place | 2017 Podčetrtek | Mixed pairs |
| Gold medal – first place | 2019 Podčetrtek | Women's singles |
| Silver medal – second place | 2017 Podčetrtek | Women's singles |
| Silver medal – second place | 2019 Podčetrtek | Mixed pairs |

Patricia De Peuter (born 23 April 1967) is a Belgian professional soft-tip and steel-tip darts player who plays in the World Darts Federation (WDF) events. Her biggest achievement to date is qualifying for the BDO World Darts Championship and winning a gold medal at the WDF Europe Cup and EDF European Darts Championship. She also participated in the WDF World Cup and EDU European Darts Championship.

== Career ==
Patricia has been a member of the Belgium national team for over 10 years. With short breaks, she represented her country at many international soft-tip and steel-tip events. In 2010, she won a silver medal in the singles cricket competition during EDU European Darts Championship in Leukerbad. In the final match, she lost to Karina Nagapetynts. In the same year, she was appointed by the Belgian federation to participate in the 2010 Winmau World Masters. In the second round match, she lost to Rhian O'Sullivan by 2–4 in legs. That same week, she won the qualifying tournament for the 2011 BDO World Darts Championship and she make her debut at this stage. In the first duel, she faced Deta Hedman and lost by 1–2 in sets.

In 2012, she was appointed by the national federation to participate in the 2012 WDF Europe Cup. In the singles competition, she presented a fantastic level, defeated Rachna David, Julie Gore and Jeannette Stoop on her way to the final. In the last match, she defeated Trina Gulliver in the last leg, finishing the match with a score 7–6 in legs, winning the historic first gold medal for the Belgium. A satisfactory result in the pairs competition gave Belgium the bronze medal in the overall classification of this tournament. In 2014, Patricia took part in the Catalonia Open, where she advanced to the final, but she lost to Sharon Prins by 2–5 in legs. In 2016, she back on the international stage during 2016 Winmau World Masters, but she was eliminated in the first round, lost to Helen Dunn by 0–4 in legs.

At the beginning of September 2022, she won her first open tournament organized by the World Darts Federation. In the final of Catalonia Open she beat Ramona Eriksen by 4–3 in legs. At the end of this month, she was selected by the national federation to participate in the 2022 WDF Europe Cup. On the second day of the tournament, she advanced to the second round of the singles competition, where she lost to Lorraine Hyde by 0–4 in legs. On the third day, she lost in the first round of the pairs competition. In the team tournament, she advanced with Belgium team to second round, where they lost to Sweden by 1–9 in legs. In December, he will take part in the 2022 Winmau World Masters as a seeded player.

== Personal life ==
She has a son and daughter. She works as an assistant in a retail company Delhaize.

== World Championship results ==
=== BDO/WDF ===
- 2011: Quarter-finals (lost to Deta Hedman 1–2) (sets)

== Performance timeline ==
| Tournament | 2010 | 2011 | 2012 | 2013 | 2014 | 2015 | 2016 |
|---|---|---|---|---|---|---|---|
WDF Ranked televised events
| World Championship | DNQ | QF | DNQ | | | | |
| World Masters | 2R | DNQ | | | | | 1R |
