= Stefanie Rennoch =

German darts player

Personal information
- Nickname: "Steffi"
- Born: 14 April 1976 (age 50) Hanover, West Germany
- Home town: Berlin, Germany

Sport
- Sport: Darts
- Playing since: 2002
- Darts: 23g DPuls
- Laterality: Right-handed

Organisation (see split in darts)
- BDO: 2013–2019
- PDC: 2022–
- WDF: 2013–2019
- Current world ranking: (WDF W) NR (17 August 2026)

WDF major events – best performances
- World Masters: Quarter Final: 2022

Other tournament wins
- Years
DDV German Ch'ship	2015
DDV German Masters	2015
Medal record
Women's Darts
Representing Germany
WDF World Cup
Silver medal – second place	2015 Antalya	Women's team
WDF Europe Cup
Bronze medal – third place	2016 Egmond aan Zee	Women's pairs
Bronze medal – third place	2016 Egmond aan Zee	Women's team

Stefanie Rennoch (née Zwitkowitsch; born 14 April 1976) is a German professional darts player who plays in Professional Darts Corporation (PDC) events.Her biggest achievement to date was qualified for 2022 PDC Women's Series semi-finals and winning a silver medal at the WDF World Cup.

== Career ==
Rennoch started playing darts in 2002, when friends persuaded her to throw a few darts. Rennoch has been taking part in German tournaments and various World Darts Federation (WDF) competitions since 2013, with more than remarkable success. She is a multiple German Champion in steel-tip and soft-tip darts and won the DDV German Masters.

At the 2015 WDF World Cup, she won her first medal at an international event in the team competition. Germany team won only five of the fourteen bouts against England and they took silver medal after tough rivalry. Moreover, in the singles competition, she advanced to the quarter-finals, where she lost 4–5 in legs to Grace Crane.

Next year, she qualified for the 2016 WDF Europe Cup and winning two bronze medals in the pairs and team competition. In the singles competition, she advanced to the quarter-finals, where she lost 1–5 in legs to Lorraine Winstanley. In December, she successfully participated in the 2016 Winmau World Masters, where she lost 3–4 in the fifth round match to Corrine Hammond and missed the television stage of that tournament.

In 2017, she advanced for the first time to final of the World Darts Federation tournament Police Masters and lost in decider leg 4–5 to Ramona Eriksen. In the same year, she once again represented her country at the 2017 WDF World Cup. Apart from losing early in the pairs and team competitions, she achieved only the third round in the singles competition, lost 2–4 in legs to Paula Murphy.

In the following years, she took part only in national tournaments, and in 2019 she tried taking part in an international tournament again. In final of the Polish Open, she lost 4–5 in legs to Fie Skinnes. It was her last start in the World Darts Federation tournament.

In 2022, she returned to competing at the international level, this time taking part in Professional Darts Corporation (PDC) tournaments for ladies. At the 2022 PDC Women's Series in August, Rennoch reached the semi-finals for the first time, lost 3–5 to Aileen de Graaf. In the same weekend, she also completed another quarter-final in her career.

== Performance timeline ==
Tournament	2016	2017	2018	2019	2020	2021	2022
WDF Ranked televised events
World Masters	5R	DNQ			NH		QF
