= Catalonia Open =

Tournament information
- Venue: Fábrica Llobet Gurí
- Location: Calella
- Country: Spain
- Established: 1995
- Organisation(s): WDF
- Format: Legs
- Prize fund: €3,400
- Month(s) Played: September

Current champion(s)
- (England) Jenson Walker (men's) (England) Paula Jacklin (women's)

The Catalonia Open is a darts tournament held in Calella, Catalonia. It has been held since 1995. The first edition was staged in Barcelona and then moved to Calella. This competition is organized by Federació Catalana de Dards (FCD) and is ranked for World Darts Federation (WDF) and British Darts Organisation (BDO). The official darts federation from Catalunya are a full member of World Darts Federation (WDF) from September 2011.

Originated by the successful participation of Catalonia Open, the organization was created FCD Anniversary Open coinciding with the twenty-fifth anniversary, and since 2015 this competition celebrates next day of the Catalonia Open on Sunday.

In 2020 the competition was canceled due to the Covid-19 pandemic.

== List of winners ==
=== Men's singles ===
Year	Champion	Av.	Score	Runner-Up	Av.	Prize Money			Venue
Year	Champion	Av.	Score	Runner-Up	Av.	Total	Ch.	R.-Up	Venue
2012	(Portugal) José de Sousa	94.90	6 – 4	(Catalonia) Antonio Jiménez	95.83	€2,340	€1,000	€400	Estació del Nord, Barcelona
2013	(Finland) Ulf Ceder	87.16	6 – 2	(Belgium) Dimitri Van den Bergh	85.92	€2,340	€1,000	€400	Fábrica Llobet Gurí, Calella
2014	(England) Alan Norris	94.72	6 – 1	(England) Sam Head	89.60	€2,340	€1,000	€400	Fábrica Llobet Gurí, Calella
2015	(Catalonia) Carles Arola	86.70	6 – 1	(Portugal) José de Sousa	81.03	€3,820	€1,800	€720	Fábrica Llobet Gurí, Calella
2016	(Catalonia) Martín Martí	92.13	6 – 5	(Netherlands) Willem Mandigers	91.36	€3,820	€1,800	€720	Fábrica Llobet Gurí, Calella
2017	(Netherlands) Chris Landman	83.83	6 – 2	(Belgium) Stefaan Henderyck	78.82	€3,820	€1,800	€720	Fábrica Llobet Gurí, Calella
2018	(Denmark) Niels Heinsøe	77.71	6 – 4	(England) Martin Compton	74.77	€3,820	€1,800	€720	Fábrica Llobet Gurí, Calella
2019	(Netherlands) Kevin Doets	93.57	6 – 3	(Catalonia) Carles Arola	83.53	€3,820	€1,800	€720	Fábrica Llobet Gurí, Calella
2021	(Belgium) Andy Baetens	105.85	5 – 0	(Catalonia) Martín Martí	82.50	€3,820	€1,800	€720	Fábrica Llobet Gurí, Calella
2022	Patrick Maat	n/a	5 – 1	Alexander Merkx	n/a	€3,600	€800	€400	Fábrica Llobet Gurí, Calella
2023	(Netherlands) Raymond van den Ende	.	5 – 4	(Netherlands) Jelle Klaasen	.	€3,600	€800	€400	Fábrica Llobet Gurí, Calella
2024	(Netherlands) Jimmy van Schie	89.18	5 – 3	(Republic of Ireland) Dylan Quinn	80.66	€3,600	€800	€400	Fábrica Llobet Gurí, Calella
2025	(Netherlands) Jimmy van Schie (2)	82.18	5 – 2	(Netherlands) Patrick Peters	72.82	€3,600	€800	€400	Fábrica Llobet Gurí, Calella
2026	(England) Jenson Walker	88.17	5 – 4	(Catalonia) Martín Martí	85.75	€3,600	€800	€400	Fábrica Llobet Gurí, Calella
2027						€3,600	€800	€400	

=== Women's singles ===
Year	Champion	Av.	Score	Runner-Up	Av.	Prize Money			Venue
Year	Champion	Av.	Score	Runner-Up	Av.	Total	Ch.	R.-Up	Venue
2012	(Belgium) Kathy Geeraerts	n/a	4 – 3	(Catalonia) Isi Chaparro	n/a	€1,100	€500	€200	Estació del Nord, Barcelona
2013	(Netherlands) Sharon Prins	n/a	5 – 2	(Belgium) Kathy Geeraerts	n/a	€1,100	€500	€200	Fábrica Llobet Gurí, Calella
2014	(Netherlands) Sharon Prins (2)	n/a	5 – 2	Patricia De Peuter	n/a	€1,100	€500	€200	Fábrica Llobet Gurí, Calella
2015	(Netherlands) Sharon Prins (3)	n/a	5 – 1	(Catalonia) Laura Damont	n/a	€1,500	€750	€300	Fábrica Llobet Gurí, Calella
2016	(Netherlands) Sharon Prins (4)	n/a	5 – 4	(Netherlands) Aileen de Graaf	n/a	€1,500	€750	€300	Fábrica Llobet Gurí, Calella
2017	(Netherlands) Sharon Prins (5)	n/a	5 – 3	(Netherlands) Aileen de Graaf	n/a	€1,500	€750	€300	Fábrica Llobet Gurí, Calella
2018	(Netherlands) Sharon Prins (6)	n/a	5 – 1	(Sweden) Maud Jansson	n/a	€1,500	€750	€300	Fábrica Llobet Gurí, Calella
2019	(Netherlands) Sharon Prins (7)	n/a	5 – 4	(Norway) Ramona Eriksen	n/a	€1,500	€750	€300	Fábrica Llobet Gurí, Calella
2021	(Netherlands) Aileen de Graaf	n/a	4 – 1	(Sweden) Anna Forsmark	n/a	€1,500	€750	€300	Fábrica Llobet Gurí, Calella
2022	Patricia De Peuter	n/a	4 – 3	(Norway) Ramona Eriksen	n/a	€1,000	€400	€200	Fábrica Llobet Gurí, Calella
2023	(Sweden) Anna Forsmark	n/a	4 – 3	(Belgium) Shana Van Nieuwenhoven	n/a	€1,000	€400	€200	Fábrica Llobet Gurí, Calella
2024	(Belgium) Patricia De Peuter (2)	82.36	4 – 0	(Hungary) Greta Tekauer	53.08	€1,000	€400	€200	Fábrica Llobet Gurí, Calella
2025	(Netherlands) Lerena Rietbergen	75.43	4 – 1	Patricia De Peuter	65.94	€1,000	€400	€200	Fábrica Llobet Gurí, Calella
2026	(England) Paula Jacklin	57.12	5 – 1	(Sweden) Anna Forsmark	52.30	€1,000	€400	€200	Fábrica Llobet Gurí, Calella
2027						€1,000	€400	€200	Fábrica Llobet Gurí, Calella

== Tournament records ==
Mens:

- Most Wins 2: (England) Jez Porter, (Netherlands) Jimmy van Schie
- Most Finals 3: (England) Colin Whiley
- Most Semi Finals 3: (England) Colin Whiley
- Most Quarter Finals 4: (Catalonia) Carles Arola

Ladies

- Most Wins 7: (Netherlands) Sharon Prins.
- Most Finals 7: (Netherlands) Sharon Prins.
- Most Semi Finals 2: (Netherlands) Aileen de Graaf
