= WDF Virtual Cup =

Tournament information
- Dates: 4 October – 11 November 2020
- Venue: Virtual
- Location: Virtual
- Organisation(s): WDF
- Format: Legs

Champion(s)
- Patrik Kovács (men's); Fallon Sherrock (women's)

The WDF Virtual Cup was the first and only edition organised by the World Darts Federation, when the coronavirus pandemic stopped the organization of many international tournaments.

Member countries may select two men and two women to compete in this event. All matches will be played online and participating players will need one device to keep score, one device with camera to show dartboards, reliable WiFi internet access, DartConnect membership and Skype account. The Virtual Cup will have men's and women's singles competitions composed of group-stage with the top four of each group advancing to a knock-out stage.

Patrik Kovács and Fallon Sherrock were the competition winners.

== Men's draw ==
Second round (best of 7 legs); 24–25 October
Alan Soutar 83.50	4
Altantülkhüür Myagmarsüren 68.38	0
Danny Baggish 96.46	4
Aleksei Kadochnikov 92.52	2
Masande Mgedeza 96.71	4
Ricardo Pietreczko 89.16	1
Adam Gawlas 91.47	4
Keane Barry 97.19	2
Anthony Tekira 84.90	4
Oleksii Bushui 74.17	2
Paul Hogan 86.45	4
Steve Russell 81.62	1
John Williams 90.91	4
Elvis Jackson 90.42	1
Zvonko Antunović 78.95	4
Benjamin Pratnemer 76.47	2
Martin Adams	4
Bruno Rangel	0
Mal Cuming 95.69	4
Neil Duff 95.81	3
Kevin Lane 93.50	4
Jacques Labre 87.48	3
Richard Veenstra 76.46	4
Vladimír Zatko 78.55	2
Sebastian Białecki 93.32	4
Robbie Mills 83.54	1
Justin Thompson 86.03	4
Colin McGarry 79.10	1
Martin Heneghan 94.96	4
Jonathan Martin 82.97	2
Patrik Kovács 112.13	4
Dameon Steffens 97.58	2

Third round (best of 7 legs); 26–29 October
Alan Soutar 88.18	4
Danny Baggish 88.06	2
Masande Mgedeza 85.10	3
Adam Gawlas 84.24	4
Anthony Tekira 99.98	4
Paul Hogan 102.24	3
John Williams 101.90	4
Zvonko Antunović 77.28	0
Martin Adams 95.43	4
Mal Cuming 92.55	0
Kevin Lane 84.68	4
Richard Veenstra 86.73	0
Sebastian Białecki 81.23	4
Justin Thompson 82.42	3
Martin Heneghan 83.18	2
Patrik Kovács 93.38	4

Quarter-finals (best of 7 legs); 1–2 November
Alan Soutar 98.50	4
Adam Gawlas 90.42	3
Anthony Tekira 81.49	2
John Williams 87.42	4
Martin Adams 91.28	4
Kevin Lane 85.71	1
Sebastian Białecki 87.67	2
Patrik Kovács 96.75	4

Semi-finals (best of 9 legs); 3–6 November
Alan Soutar 99.00	5
John Williams 99.52	3
Martin Adams 87.71	3
Patrik Kovács 97.83	5

Final (best of 11 legs); 11 November
Alan Soutar 95.50	4
Patrik Kovács 88.57	6

== Women's draw ==
Second round (best of 7 legs); 24–25 October
Mikuru Suzuki 78.03	4
Denise Cassidy 77.10	1
Lorraine Winstanley 71.57	4
Robin Curry 61.56	0
Irina Armstrong 74.18	4
Zahra Rajabi 65.24	2
Katie Sheldon 65.10	4
Jitka Císařová 64.72	1
Tori Kewish 70.53	4
Kristine Mickus 60.80	1
Ksenia Klochek 66.73	4
Trish Grzesik 64.17	1
Aileen de Graaf 81.24	4
Martina Sulovská 62.17	0
Ema Hawley 60.09	4
Jasminka Adamic 61.04	3
Fallon Sherrock 73.32	4
Petrica Massiah 56.69	0
Erdenechimeg Dondov 61.98	4
Sarmite Lavrentjeva 47.97	0
Marina Letica 62.63	4
Elodie Valentin 56.55	0
Kriya Odayar 70.24	4
Anca Zijlstra 69.96	1
Diane Gobeil 67.35	4
Elena Shulgina 71.14	1
Lorraine Hyde 71.22	4
Kasumi Sato 69.45	2
Robyn Byrne 65.64	4
Vladimira Tonarova 65.77	1
Tracey Davies 72.35	4
Katarína Nagyová 66.21	3

Third round (best of 7 legs); 26–29 October
Mikuru Suzuki 79.22	4
Lorraine Winstanley 84.41	1
Irina Armstrong 66.29	4
Katie Sheldon 64.46	1
Tori Kewish 66.38	2
Ksenia Klochek 72.95	4
Aileen de Graaf 63.72	4
Ema Hawley 60.34	1
Fallon Sherrock 79.19	4
Erdenechimeg Dondov 69.27	1
Marina Letica 71.45	4
Kriya Odayar 70.95	2
Diane Gobeil 58.74	4
Lorraine Hyde 59.67	3
Robyn Byrne 63.02	3
Tracey Davies 71.96	4

Quarter-finals (best of 7 legs); 1–2 November
Mikuru Suzuki 62.96	0
Irina Armstrong 76.10	4
Ksenia Klochek 70.76	4
Aileen de Graaf 71.85	3
Fallon Sherrock 80.29	4
Marina Letica 66.89	1
Diane Gobeil 68.14	4
Tracey Davies 64.07	2

Semi-finals (best of 9 legs); 3–6 November
Irina Armstrong 62.43	1
Ksenia Klochek 66.40	5
Fallon Sherrock 78.48	5
Diane Gobeil 71.17	4

Final (best of 11 legs); 11 November
Ksenia Klochek 66.82	1
Fallon Sherrock 79.64	6

== Top averages ==
This table shows the highest averages achieved by players throughout the knock-out stage of tournament.

#	Player	Round	Average	Result
1	Patrik Kovács	R2	112.13	Won
2	Paul Hogan	R3	102.24	Lost
3	John Williams	R3	101.90	Won
4	Anthony Tekira	R3	99.98	Won
5	John Williams	SF	99.52	Lost
6	Alan Soutar	SF	99.00	Won
7	Alan Soutar	R2	98.50	Won
8	Patrik Kovács	SF	97.83	Won
9	Dameon Steffens	R1	97.58	Lost
10	Keane Barry	R1	97.19	Lost
