= Harley Kemp =

Australian darts player

Personal information
- Nickname: "The Wonder Boy"
- Born: 9 July 1994 (age 32) Werribee, Victoria, Australia
- Home town: Melbourne, Victoria, Australia

Sport
- Sport: Darts
- Playing since: 2007
- Darts: 23g Puma Darts Russell Stewart Legend
- Laterality: Right-handed
- Walk-on music: "Million Voices" by Otto Knows

Organisation (see split in darts)
- BDO: 2011–2017
- PDC: 2018–2021

WDF major events – best performances
- World Championship: Last 40: 2014
- World Masters: Last 272: 2013
- World Trophy: Last 32: 2014

Other tournament wins
- Tournament: Years
- Australian Masters Central Coast Australian Classic DPA ProTour Event Mittagong RSL Open: 2013; 2013 2023; 2012

Harley Kemp (born 9 July 1994) is an Australian professional darts player. He won the Australian Masters in 2013 and qualified for the 2014 BDO World Darts Championship.

== Career ==
In 2013, Harley won the Australian Masters and the Central Coast Australian Classic. He qualified for the 2014 BDO World Darts Championship he played Michael Meaney in the preliminary round and lost 3–0. He played Darryl Fitton at the 2014 BDO World Trophy, he lost 5–6 in legs.

Harley quit of the PDC in April 2021.

== World Championship results ==
=== BDO ===
- 2014: Preliminary round (lost to Michael Meaney 0–3) (sets)
