= Andreas Harrysson =

Swedish darts player (born 1975)

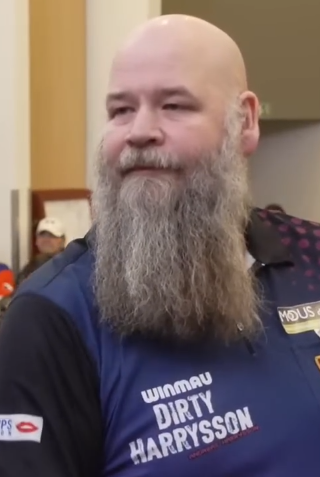
- Harrysson in 2024

Personal information
- Nickname: "Dirty Harrysson"
- Born: 3 June 1975 (age 51) Sweden
- Home town: Målilla, Sweden

Sport
- Sport: Darts
- Playing since: 1999
- Darts: 21g Winmau Signature
- Laterality: Right-handed
- Walk-on music: "The Nights" by Avicii

Organisation (see split in darts)
- BDO: 2013–2020
- PDC: 2019–
- WDF: 2013–
- Current world ranking: (PDC) 172 ▼2 (18 October 2026)

WDF major events – best performances
- World Championship: Last 32: 2020
- World Masters: Last 32: 2024

PDC premier events – best performances
- World Championship: Last 16: 2026
- UK Open: Last 128: 2025

Other tournament wins
- Years
Denmark Masters	2024
Finnish Masters	2018
Nordic Cup	2022
PDC Challenge Tour	2024 (x2)
PDCNB Tour	2022, 2024, 2025 (x4)
MODUS Super Series 7	2024
Medal record
Men's Darts
Representing Sweden
WDF World Cup
Bronze medal – third place	2023 Esbjerg	Men's team
Bronze medal – third place	2025 Seoul	Men's team
WDF Europe Cup
Gold medal – first place	2018 Budapest	Men's team
Gold medal – first place	2024 Šamorín	Men's pairs
Gold medal – first place	2024 Šamorín	Men's team
Gold medal – first place	2024 Šamorín	Men's overall
Bronze medal – third place	2016 Egmond aan Zee	Men's singles
Bronze medal – third place	2016 Egmond aan Zee	Men's pairs
Bronze medal – third place	2016 Egmond aan Zee	Men's overall
Bronze medal – third place	2022 Gandía	Men's team

Andreas Harrysson (born 3 June 1975) is a Swedish darts player who competes in Professional Darts Corporation (PDC) and World Darts Federation (WDF) events. He has won six titles on the PDC Nordic & Baltic Tour and two on the PDC Challenge Tour.

== Career ==
=== 2016 ===
In 2016 Harrysson won the Nordic Cup Men Singles.

He also played at the WDF Europe Cup for the first time, reaching the semi-finals of the 2016 edition, losing out to Wales player Jim Williams.

=== 2017 ===
In 2017 Harrysson became the Swedish champion for the first time.

=== 2018 ===
In 2018 Harrysson defended the Swedish title and also won the WDF Finnish Masters and WDF Europe Cup Men Teams as well as the Nordic Cup Pairs.

=== 2019 ===
Harrysson added a third consecutive Swedish title in 2019, joining the likes of Stefan Lord and Magnus Caris in winning it three times.

He qualified for the 2020 BDO World Darts Championship as the Baltic & Scandinavian Qualifier.

=== 2020 ===
At Lakeside Harrysson made his first appearance in a televised event. At the 2020 BDO World Darts Championship, televised live on Eurosport, Harrysson won his preliminary round game 3–2 in sets against the 2019 World Masters champion John O'Shea before losing out to number one seed Wesley Harms in the first round 3–2 in sets.

Harrysson made his PDC debut in October 2020 at the 2020 International Darts Open, after qualifying via the Nordic & Baltic qualifier. He defeated Benito van de Pas in the first round before losing out to James Wade in the second round.

=== 2021 ===
Harrysson made his second appearance on the European Tour at the 2021 Gibraltar Darts Trophy. He won his first game against Keane Barry before losing out to Danny Noppert in the second round.

=== 2023 ===
In June Harrysson participated in the World Series of Darts for the first time. At the 2023 Nordic Darts Masters he lost in the first round to Michael van Gerwen.

In December Harrysson hit a nine-dart finish in a deciding leg in a 4–3 win against Andreas Toft-Jørgensen in the Modus Super Series.

=== 2024 ===
Harrysson made his third appearance on the European Tour at the 2024 Belgian Darts Open. He defeated Gian van Veen 6–1 in the first round with an average of 107.27. In the second round he lost out to Gary Anderson 6–5 in a last leg decider.

In March, in Group A, Session 1 of Week 5 of Modus Super Series 7, Harryson posted a 117.88 average in a 4–0 whitewash of Michael Burgoine. Harrysson followed this up with winning the event and becoming the second player in history to win three MODUS Super Series weekly events. By winning the event he qualified for the MODUS Super Series Champions Week. Harrysson withdrew from the Nordic Cup in order to participate in Champions Week.

In May Harrysson won the Modus Super Series 7 Champions Week. He defeated Cam Crabtree 4–3 in the final, finishing 121 on the Bullseye in the deciding leg. Harrysson received £25,000 in prize money for his victory.

In September, he picked up three gold medals while representing Sweden at the WDF Europe Cup, winning the pairs event with Johan Engström, team event and the men's overall event.

In November, Harrysson won his first two PDC Challenge Tour titles. He defeated Stefaan Henderyck 5–2 in the final of Challenge Tour 22 (CT22) and Connor Scutt 5–3 in the CT23 final.

=== 2025 ===
In 2025, Harrysson won four titles in PDC Nordic & Baltic Tour events. He topped the Nordic & Baltic Order of Merit, qualifying him for his PDC World Darts Championship debut. At the 2026 PDC World Championship, he defeated 12th seed Ross Smith 3–2 in sets in the first round, before defeating Motomu Sakai 3–0 in the second round and Ricardo Pietreczko 4–2 in the third round. He was defeated 4–2 by Jonny Clayton in the fourth round.

== World Championship results ==
=== BDO ===
- 2020: First round (lost to Wesley Harms 2–3)

=== WDF ===
- 2022: First round (lost to László Kádár 1–2)

=== PDC ===
- 2026: Fourth round (lost to Jonny Clayton 2–4)

== Performance timeline ==
=== BDO ===
Tournament	2014	2016	2017	2018	2019	2020
BDO Ranked televised events
World Championship	Did not qualify					1R
World Masters	1R	2R	3R	1R	2R	NH

=== WDF ===
Tournament	2022	2024
WDF Ranked televised events
World Championship	1R	DNQ
World Masters	2R	4R

=== PDC ===
Tournament	2025	2026
PDC Ranked televised events
World Championship	DNQ	4R
World Masters	Prel.	
UK Open	2R	
Career statistics
Season-end ranking (PDC)	73	

=== PDC European Tour ===
Season	1	2	3	4	5	6	7	8	9	10	11	12	13	14
2020	Did not qualify			IDO; 2R										
2021	HDT; DNQ	GDT; 2R												
2024	BDO; 2R	Did not qualify												
2025	Did not qualify							EDO; 3R	Did not qualify					

=== PDC Players Championships ===
Season	1	2	3	4	5	6	7	8	9	10	11	12	13	14	15	16	17	18	19	20	21	22	23	24	25	26	27	28	29	30	31	32	33	34
2025 (Note: Not a Tour card holder)	Did not participate												ROS; 1R	ROS; 4R	HIL; 1R	HIL; 1R	Did not participate					HIL; 3R	HIL; 4R	MIL; DNP		HIL; 2R	HIL; 2R	LEI; DNP			WIG; 4R	WIG; 2R	WIG; DNP	

Performance Table Legend
W	Won the tournament	F	Finalist	SF	Semifinalist	QF	Quarterfinalist	#R; RR; Prel.	Lost in # round Round-robin; Preliminary round	DQ	Disqualified
DNQ	Did not qualify	DNP	Did not participate	WD	Withdrew	NH	Tournament not held	#R; RR; Prel.	Lost in # round Round-robin; Preliminary round	NYF	Not yet founded

== Nine-dart finishes ==
Andreas Harrysson's televised nine-dart finishes
Date	Opponent	Tournament	Method	Ref.
10 December 2023	Andreas Toft Jørgensen	Modus Super Series	3 x T20; 3 x T20; T20, T15, D18	
