= Patrik Kovács (darts player) =

Hungarian darts player (born 1996)

Personal information
- Nickname: "The Planner"
- Born: 3 June 1996 (age 30) Ózd, Hungary

Sport
- Sport: Darts
- Playing since: 2010
- Darts: 23g Bull's Signature
- Laterality: Right-handed
- Walk-on music: "Let's Get It Started" by Black Eyed Peas

Organisation (see split in darts)
- BDO: 2012–2020
- PDC: 2011, 2018–2021
- WDF: 2012–present
- Current world ranking: (PDC) 145 ▼1 (18 October 2026)

WDF major events – best performances
- World Championship: Last 48: 2023, 2024
- World Masters: Group Stage: 2024

PDC premier events – best performances
- World Championship: Last 128: 2026

Other tournament wins
- Years
Budapest Classic	2021, 2022
Budapest Masters	2021
Romanian Open	2022
Serbia Open	2022
WDF Virtual Cup	2020
Youth events
Hungarian Open	2011, 2012, 2013
Medal record
Men's Darts
Representing Hungary
WDF Europe Cup Youth
Bronze medal – third place	2013 Keszthely	Boys pairs

Patrik Kovács (born 3 June 1996) is a Hungarian darts player who competes in Professional Darts Corporation (PDC) and World Darts Federation (WDF) events. He is a two-time Budapest Classic champion. He has represented Hungary five times at the PDC World Cup of Darts.

== Career ==
At the age of 16, he took part in the PDC Development Tour for the first time, where he reached his first quarter-finals in 2011. In the following years, he competed only in national tournaments of international rank, where he three-time won the Hungarian Open youth's competition. In 2013, he was invited by the national federation to participate in the 2013 WDF Europe Cup Youth. In the singles competition he was eliminated in the second round, but in the pairs competition with András Borbényi they won a bronze medal.

In 2015, based on the national results, he was invited to participate in the senior 2015 WDF World Cup. In the singles competition he lost in the first round to Darius Labanauskas by 2–4 in legs. In the pairs and team competition he did not achieve success, dropping out in the first phase of both competitions. Nevertheless, Kovács took part in the 2016 PDC World Cup of Darts for the first time, where he reached the second round together with Nándor Bezzeg, defeating quite unexpectedly the representation of Thailand in the first round match. In the second round, they lost to Belgium in singles matches against Kim Huybrechts and Ronny Huybrechts.

In 2016, he also went to the Hungarian Classic final and played in the 2016 WDF Europe Cup where representing Hungary. However, he was knocked out again in the early stages of all competitions. In 2018, Kovács qualified for the 2018 International Darts Open, where he lost in the first round match to Steve Lennon by 1–6 in legs. It was also the year he transferred his commitment to Professional Darts Corporation tournaments. In November, he took part in the 2018 PDC World Youth Championship for the first time. In the group stage, he lost both matches against Keelan Kay and the eventual winner Dimitri Van den Bergh.

In 2019, Kovács played in his first PDC Q-School, once it went to the Last 32 phase. However, the lack of success brought him back to competing in World Darts Federation tournaments. His best achievement was his promotion to the Last 16 phase of the Apatin Open. In the second half of the year, he reached his second quarter-finals on the PDC Development Tour. He won the Eastern Europe Qualifier for the 2019 PDC World Youth Championship, while he lost in the group-stage against the favored Keane Barry.

He also took part in the PDC Q-School in 2020, but again, not successfully. In some World Darts Federation tournaments, Kovács made it to the Last 16 phase before qualifying for the 2020 PDC World Cup of Darts when he played for Hungary with János Végső. In the first round match they were defeated by José de Sousa and José Marquês from Portugal by 0–5 in legs. At the end of the year, he had a good chance to start in the PDC World Darts Championship, but lost in the Eastern Europe qualifying tournament to Boris Krcmar.

At the beginning of November 2020, Kovács participated in the WDF Virtual Cup. Kovács registered two ton-plus averages during the early stages of the competition, finishing third in his group due to losses against Dale Hughes and Ricardo Pietreczko. Hungarian recorded over 112 average in a match against Dameon Steffens, before beat Martin Heneghan and Sebastian Białecki to reach the semi-finals. Kovács subsequently denied Martin Adams in the semi-finals and finally beat Alan Soutar by 6–4 in legs to take the unique cup.

In 2021, he once again became a representative of Hungary in the 2021 PDC World Cup of Darts with János Végső. This time they fell again in the first round match, losing to Darius Labanauskas and Mindaugas Barauskas from Lithuania. In September, he took part in the 2021 Gibraltar Darts Trophy, but he lost to Rob Cross by 4–6 in legs.

In 2022, Kovács won the Budapest Classic and a little later he was successful at the Romanian Open. At the Serbia Open, he won his third World Darts Federation title in this year. Outstanding performance in the region allowed him to gain a powerful ranking advantage, guaranteeing him a debut in the 2023 WDF World Darts Championship.

== World Championship results ==
=== WDF ===
- 2023: First round (lost to Jim Widmayer 1–2)
- 2024: First round (lost to Björn Lejon 0–2)

=== PDC ===
- 2026: First round (lost to Callan Rydz 0–3)

== Performance timeline ==
WDF

Tournament	2023	2024
WDF Ranked televised events
World Championship	1R	1R

PDC

Tournament	2016	2020	2021	2023	2026
PDC Ranked televised events
World Championship	DNP/DNQ				1R
Non-ranked televised events
PDC World Cup of Darts	2R	1R	1R	RR	RR
