= 2024 European Darts Grand Prix =

2024 NEO.bet European Darts Grand Prix

Tournament information
- Dates: 19–21 April 2024
- Venue: Glaspalast
- Location: Sindelfingen, Germany
- Organisation(s): Professional Darts Corporation (PDC)
- Format: Legs
- Prize fund: £175,000
- Winner's share: £30,000
- High checkout: 170; Josh Rock (x3)

Champion(s)
- Gary Anderson

The 2024 European Darts Grand Prix, known as the 2024 NEO.bet European Darts Grand Prix for sponsorship reasons, was a professional darts tournament that took place at the Glaspalast in Sindelfingen, Germany from 19 to 21 April 2024. It was the fourth of thirteen European Tour events on the 2024 PDC Pro Tour. It featured a field of 48 players and £175,000 in prize money, with £30,000 going to the winner.

Rob Cross was the defending champion after defeating Luke Humphries 8–6 in the 2023 final. He was eliminated in the semi-finals, losing 5–7 to eventual winner Gary Anderson.

Gary Anderson won his first European Tour title since the 2014 German Darts Championship, defeating Ross Smith 8–6 in the final.

== Prize money ==
The prize fund remained at £175,000, with £30,000 to the winner:

Stage (num. of players)		Prize money
Winner	(1)	£30,000
Runner-up	(1)	£12,000
Losing semi-finalists	(2)	£8,500
Losing quarter-finalists	(4)	£6,000
Third round losers	(8)	£4,000
Second round losers	(16)	£2,500*
First round losers	(16)	£1,250*
Total	£175,000	

* Pre-qualified players from the Orders of Merit who lose in their first match of the event shall not be credited with prize money on any Order of Merit. A player who qualifies as a qualifier, but later becomes a seed due to the withdrawal of one or more other players shall be credited with their prize money on all Orders of Merit regardless of how far they progress in the event.

== Qualification and format ==
A massive overhaul in the qualification for the 2024 European Tour events was announced on 7 January.

For the first time, both the PDC Order of Merit and the PDC Pro Tour Order of Merit rankings were used to determine 32 of the 48 entrants for the event. The top 16 on the PDC Order of Merit qualified, along with the highest 16 ranked players on the PDC ProTour Order of Merit (after the PDC Order of Merit players were removed). From those 32 players, the 16 highest ranked players on the PDC ProTour Order of Merit were seeded for the event. The seedings were confirmed on 16 February.

The remaining 16 places went to players from four qualifying events – 10 from the Tour Card Holder Qualifier (held on 21 February), four from the Host Nation Qualifier (held on 18 February), one from the Nordic & Baltic Associate Member Qualifier (held on 4 April), and one from the East European Associate Member Qualifier (held on 11 February).

Nathan Aspinall and Dimitri Van den Bergh withdrew and were replaced by Ian White and Niels Zonneveld.

The following players took part in the tournament:

Seeded Players

1. Dave Chisnall (third round)
2. Luke Humphries (quarter-finals)
3. Gerwyn Price (third round)
4. Damon Heta (quarter-finals)
5. Dirk van Duijvenbode (second round)
6. Josh Rock (quarter-finals)
7. Rob Cross (semi-finals)
8. Michael van Gerwen (semi-finals)
9. Jonny Clayton (third round)
10. Danny Noppert (third round)
11. Michael Smith (third round)
12. Ross Smith (runner-up)
13. Krzysztof Ratajski (second round)
14. Gary Anderson (champion)
15. Ryan Searle (second round)
16. Ricardo Pietreczko (second round)

Order of Merit Qualifiers
- Peter Wright (first round)
- Joe Cullen (first round)
- Chris Dobey (second round)
- Stephen Bunting (third round)
- Martin Schindler (second round)
- Andrew Gilding (first round)
- Daryl Gurney (second round)
- James Wade (first round)
- Gian van Veen (first round)
- Gabriel Clemens (quarter-finals)
- José de Sousa (first round)
- Brendan Dolan (second round)
- Raymond van Barneveld (second round)
- Luke Woodhouse (second round)

Tour Card Qualifier
- Keane Barry (second round)
- Callan Rydz (first round)
- Luke Littler (second round)
- Martin Lukeman (first round)
- Ritchie Edhouse (third round)
- Jeffrey Sparidaans (second round)
- Mickey Mansell (second round)
- Stephen Burton (first round)
- Scott Williams (third round)
- Christian Perez (second round)

Host Nation Qualifier
- René Eidams (first round)
- Franz Rötzsch (first round)
- Arno Merk (first round)
- Niko Springer (first round)

Nordic & Baltic Qualifier
- Johan Engström (second round)

East European Qualifier
- Romeo Grbavac (first round)

Reserve List
- Ian White (first round)
- Niels Zonneveld (first round)

== Draw ==
Numbers to the left of players' names show the seedings for the top 16 in the tournament. The two reserves are indicated by (Alt). The figures to the right of a player's name state their three-dart average in a match. Players in bold denote match winners.

**First round** (best of 11 legs); 19 April
Stephen Burton 86.85	5
**Keane Barry 87.70**	**6**
**Gabriel Clemens 89.77**	**6**
René Eidams 78.41	1
**Johan Engström 99.14**	**6**
Joe Cullen 86.14	1
**Chris Dobey 97.21**	**6**
Alt	Ian White 90.34	1
Peter Wright 88.47	5
**Mickey Mansell 87.53**	**6**
**Scott Williams 88.42**	**6**
Niko Springer 83.78	1
**Ritchie Edhouse 103.15**	**6**
James Wade 86.76	2
**Luke Woodhouse 95.00**	**6**
Martin Lukeman 91.07	4
Arno Merk 67.54	0
**Luke Littler 101.33**	**6**
**Stephen Bunting 98.60**	**6**
Romeo Grbavac 89.32	1
**Martin Schindler 108.82**	**6**
Gian van Veen 100.29	2
José de Sousa 90.84	2
**Daryl Gurney 95.85**	**6**
Andrew Gilding 90.61	4
**Brendan Dolan 97.68**	**6**
Alt	Niels Zonneveld 97.25	4
**Christian Perez 88.51**	**6**
Callan Rydz 80.02	1
**Jeffrey Sparidaans 90.18**	**6**
Franz Rötzsch 92.64	2
**Raymond van Barneveld 93.73**	**6**

**Second round** (best of 11 legs); 20 April
**1**	**Dave Chisnall 86.64**	**6**
Keane Barry 84.81	3
16	Ricardo Pietreczko 80.15	2
**Gabriel Clemens 93.64**	**6**
**8**	**Michael van Gerwen 100.75**	**6**
Johan Engström 92.07	1
**9**	**Jonny Clayton 96.58**	**6**
Chris Dobey 96.97	5
**4**	**Damon Heta 117.48**	**6**
Mickey Mansell 104.81	2
13	Krzysztof Ratajski 94.08	4
**Scott Williams 92.94**	**6**
5	Dirk van Duijvenbode 85.53	1
**Ritchie Edhouse 94.68**	**6**
**12**	**Ross Smith 92.88**	**6**
Luke Woodhouse 84.79	2
**2**	**Luke Humphries 101.15**	**6**
Luke Littler 100.10	5
15	Ryan Searle 102.38	5
**Stephen Bunting 98.20**	**6**
**7**	**Rob Cross 102.65**	**6**
Martin Schindler 106.08	5
**10**	**Danny Noppert 103.89**	**6**
Daryl Gurney 99.97	5
**3**	**Gerwyn Price 110.12**	**6**
Brendan Dolan 101.50	1
**14**	**Gary Anderson 110.23**	**6**
Christian Perez 94.41	3
**6**	**Josh Rock 90.89**	**6**
Jeffrey Sparidaans 86.06	2
**11**	**Michael Smith 94.79**	**6**
Raymond van Barneveld 96.09	5

**Third round** (best of 11 legs); 21 April
1	Chisnall 93.40	3
**Clemens 101.43**	**6**
**8**	**van Gerwen 93.71**	**6**
9	Clayton 87.80	4
**4**	**Heta 92.83**	**6**
Williams 89.30	2
Edhouse 85.96	5
**12**	**R. Smith 90.94**	**6**
**2**	**Humphries 105.86**	**6**
Bunting 100.92	5
**7**	**Cross 91.14**	**6**
10	Noppert 94.46	1
3	Price 98.49	4
**14**	**Anderson 102.52**	**6**
**6**	**Rock 96.58**	**6**
11	M. Smith 99.76	5

**Quarter-finals** (best of 11 legs); 21 April
Clemens 94.40	3
**8**	**van Gerwen 99.23**	**6**
4	Heta 90.68	5
**12**	**R. Smith 95.41**	**6**
2	Humphries 94.96	2
**7**	**Cross 98.46**	**6**
**14**	**Anderson 89.52**	**6**
6	Rock 93.83	5

**Semi-finals** (best of 13 legs); 21 April
8	van Gerwen 94.73	6
**12**	**R. Smith 98.77**	**7**
7	Cross 89.89	5
**14**	**Anderson 93.31**	**7**

**Final** (best of 15 legs); 21 April
12	R. Smith 90.88	6
**14**	**Anderson 90.76**	**8**
