= Sven Verdonck (darts player) =

Belgian darts player

Personal information
- Nickname: "Slow Hand"
- Born: 26 December 1963 (age 62) Zele, Belgium
- Home town: Zele, Belgium

Sport
- Sport: Darts
- Playing since: 2001
- Darts: 21g
- Laterality: Left-handed
- Walk-on music: "Lose Yourself" by Eminem

Organisation (see split in darts)
- BDO: 2013–2020
- PDC: 2001–2003
- WDF: 2013–
- Current world ranking: (WDF) NR (17 August 2026)

WDF major events – best performances
- World Masters: Last 16: 2015

Other tournament wins
- Tournament: Years
- Brussels Open: 2015

Sven Verdonck (born 26 December 1963) is a Belgian professional darts player.

== Career ==
Verdnock has played darts professionally since 2001. He has never won a tournament, with his highest placements being making it to the final of the Antwerp Open in 2016 semi-finals in 2015 England Masters and 2014 British Classic. Verdonck wins of the 2015 Brussels Open he defeated Scott Waites of England.

He qualified for the 2017 BDO World Darts Championship.
