= Thorgeir Guðmundsson =

Icelandic-Danish clergy and ancient manuscript publisher

Thorgeir Guðmundsson (27 December 1794 - 28 January 1871) was an Icelandic-Danish clergyman and publisher of ancient Norse manuscripts. He was a co-founder of the Royal Society for Ancient Norse Manuscripts in 1825.

== Early life and education ==
Guðmundsson was born at Olafsvellir, Iceland. He matriculated in 1814 from Bessastaðir before moving to Copenhagen in 1824 to study theology at the University of Copenhagen. He received his Master of Theology degree in 1924. He spent the following 15 years teaching at the naval boys' school and the school (kateket) under Holmens Church.

== Icelandic manuscripts ==
Guðmundsson was a co-founder of Det Kongelige Nordiske Oldskriftselskab (1825) and was the publisher or co-publisher of several volumes of Fornmanna sögur. He was also instrumental in the publication of Islendinga sögur I-II (1829–30) and other publications. In 1827, he received economic support from the society to travel to Stockholm to copy and register saga manuscripts. He did not acquire a deeper knowledge of philology, and his publications are flawed by a number of misreadings and other errors.

== Late life on Lolland ==
A controversy with the Society of Ancient Norse Manuscripts' secretary C. C. Rafn prompted Guðmundsson to leave his position. In 1839, he was appointed as pastor of Gloslunde and Græshave on Lolland. In 1849, he was transferred to Nysted and Herridslev. He is buried at Nysted Cemetery.
