= Christine Hunt =

Australian javelin thrower (1950–2020)

Personal information
- Nationality: Australian
- Born: 15 June 1950
- Died: 25 September 2020 (aged 70)

Sport
- Sport: Athletics
- Event: Javelin throw

Christine Hunt (15 June 1950 – 25 September 2020) was an Australian athlete. She competed in the women's javelin throw at the 1976 Summer Olympics.
