= Michael Meaney (darts player) =

Irish darts player

Personal information
- Nickname: Powerhouse
- Born: 5 December 1989 (age 36) Kilkenny, Ireland
- Home town: Bandon, County Cork, Ireland

Sport
- Sport: Darts
- Playing since: 2009
- Darts: 21g
- Laterality: Right-handed
- Walk-on music: "Levels" by Avicii

Organisation (see split in darts)
- BDO: 2010–2020
- WDF: 2019–2023

WDF major events – best performances
- World Championship: Last 32: 2014
- World Masters: Last 32: 2016, 2017

Michael Meaney (born 5 December 1989) is a former Irish professional darts player who competed in British Darts Organisation (BDO) and World Darts Federation (WDF) events. He reached the last 32 at both the 2014 BDO World Darts Championship and the World Masters in 2016 and 2017.

== Career ==
=== BDO ===
He qualified for the 2014 BDO World Darts Championship, defeating Harley Kemp 3–0 in the preliminary round. He lost to Ross Montgomery 3–2 in the first round.

Meaney left the BDO in 2020, and it was dissolved that year.

== World Championship results ==
=== BDO ===
- 2014: First round (lost to Ross Montgomery 2–3) (sets)
