= Ulf Ceder =

Finnish darts player (born 1974)

Personal information
- Born: 17 April 1974 (age 52) Finland
- Home town: Lahti, Finland

Sport
- Sport: Darts
- Playing since: 1991
- Darts: 24 Gram
- Laterality: Right-handed
- Walk-on music: "The Game" by Motörhead

Organisation (see split in darts)
- BDO: 1996–2012
- PDC: 2012–2020

WDF major events – best performances
- World Championship: Last 32: 2006
- World Masters: Last 32: 1996

Other tournament wins
- Tournament: Years
- Catalonia Open Darts Finland National Championship Turkish Open SDC Pro Tour SDC Finland: 2013; 2005 2011 2014

Ulf Ceder (born 17 April 1974) is a Finnish former professional darts player.

== Career ==
Ceder reached the first round of the 1996 Winmau World Masters where he lost to Roland Scholten. Ceder then reached the last 32 stage of the 2004 WDF Europe Cup, defeating John Walton before losing to Robert Wagner. He then won the 2005 Finland National Championship, beating Kim Viljanen in the final.

Ceder qualified for the 2006 BDO World Darts Championship, winning one of six places in the international playoffs. He was beaten in the first round 3–1 by Scotland's Mike Veitch. In 2008, Ceder attempted to make a return to the World Championship by entering the PDC's Finnish Qualifying Event, in a bid to become Finland's first ever qualifier in the PDC World Darts Championship but lost in the semi-final stage.

He played in the inaugural 2012 SDC Scandinavian Tour, finishing sixth overall, and finished runner-up to Jani Haavisto in the first event of the 2013 tour.

== World Championship results ==
=== BDO ===
- 2006: 1st round (lost to Mike Veitch 1–3)
