= Rachna David =

Norwegian darts player

Personal information
- Nickname: The Tigress
- Born: 22 October 1985 (age 40) Oslo, Norway

Sport
- Sport: Darts
- Playing since: 1996
- Laterality: Right-handed
- Walk-on music: "Crazy Frog" by Axel F

Organisation (see split in darts)
- BDO: 2011–2020
- WDF: 2011–
- Current world ranking: (WDF W) 19 (17 August 2026)

WDF major events – best performances
- World Championship: Last 16: 2014, 2018
- World Masters: Runner-up: 2025
- World Trophy: Last 16: 2014
- Dutch Open: Runner-up: 2026

Rachna David
Medal record

Women's Darts

Representing Norway

WDF Europe Cup
Bronze medal – third place	2018 Budapest	Women's singles

Rachna David (born 22 October 1985) is a darts player who competes in World Darts Federation events. She finished as the runner-up at the World Masters in 2025 and the Dutch Open in 2026. She also competed in 2 BDO World Championships.

== Career ==
David qualified for the 2014 BDO World Darts Championship as a qualifier, facing Julie Gore in the last 16, she lost 2–0. She qualified for the 2018 BDO World Darts Championship as one of the Playoff Qualifiers, facing Deta Hedman in the last 16, she lost 2–0.

David has played in two platinum event finals in the World Darts Federation having reached the final of the 2025 World Masters where she lost to Lorraine Hyde 6–5 and in the 2026 Dutch Open where she lost to Priscilla Steenbergen in the final 5–3.

== World Championship results ==
=== BDO ===
- 2014: Last 16 (lost to Julie Gore 0–2)
- 2018: Last 16 (lost to Deta Hedman 0–2)

== Career finals ==
=== WDF major finals: 2 ===
Legend
World Masters (0–1)

Outcome	No.	Year	Championship	Opponent in the final	Score (Note: (l) = score in legs, (s) = score in sets.)
Runner-up	1.	2025	World Masters	Lorraine Hyde	5–6 (l)
Runner-up	2.	2026	Dutch Open	Priscilla Steenbergen	3–5 (l)
