= Sharon Prins =

Dutch darts player

Personal information
- Full name: Sharon Boxem-Prins
- Nickname: "Racing Angel"
- Born: 24 August 1988 (age 38) 's-Gravenzande, Netherlands
- Home town: Zoetermeer, Netherlands

Sport
- Sport: Darts
- Playing since: 2006
- Darts: Harrows Cobalt
- Laterality: Right-handed
- Walk-on music: "Born to Be Wild" by Steppenwolf

Organisation (see split in darts)
- BDO: 2010–2020

WDF major events – best performances
- World Championship: Semi-final: 2013, 2015
- World Masters: Last 20: 2018
- World Trophy: Quarter-final: 2014, 2018
- Finder Masters: Last 6 Group: 2012, 2013, 2014, 2015, 2016, 2017, 2018

Other tournament wins
- Tournament: Years
- Sunparks Masters Catalonia Open Darts: 2013; Winner 2013, 2014, 2015, 2016, 2017, 2018

Sharon Prins (also known by her married name Sharon Boxem-Prins; born 24 August 1988) is a former Dutch darts player who played in events of the British Darts Organisation (BDO).

== Career ==
Prins was born in 1988 in Zoetermeer and became a darts player in 2006. Her nickname is "Racing Angel" and follows from her passion for motorcycling. Prins plays darts since 2006. She managed to qualify for the BDO Women World Championship 2013, where she lost in the semi-final to Lisa Ashton.

Prins has won the Catalonia Open Darts in 2013, 2014, 2015, 2016, 2017, and 2018.

== 2020 ==
Since the 2020 World Championship she has not participated in any darts event.

== BDO World Championships results ==
=== BDO ===
- 2013: Semi-final (lost to Lisa Ashton 0–2)
- 2014: Quarter Final (lost to Irina Armstrong 1–2)
- 2015: Semi-final (lost to Lisa Ashton 0–2)
- 2017: Last 16 (lost to Lisa Ashton 0–2)
- 2018: Quarter Final (lost to Deta Hedman 0–2)
- 2019: Quarter Final (lost to Mikuru Suzuki 0–2)
- 2020: Last 16 (lost to Anastasia Dobromyslova 0–2)
