= 2022 CDC Tour series =

Professional darts tournament

The 2022 CDC Tour consisted of 12 darts tournaments on the 2022 PDC Pro Tour. The tournament is exclusively for players from the United States and Canada, with each nation hosting two weekends of three events, making a total of 12 tournaments. The highest ranking player from each nation qualified for the 2023 PDC World Darts Championship.

== Prize money ==
The prize money for CDC Tour events is as follows:

Stage	Prize money
Winner	US$2,000
Runner-up	US$1,000
Semi-finalists	US$750
Quarter-finalists	US$500
Last 16	US$250
Last 32	US$125

== May ==
=== CDC Tour 1 ===
Tour 1 (also known as the Galaxy Grand Prix) was contested on Saturday 14 May at American Legion Post 331, Brownsburg, United States. The tournament was won by Matt Campbell.

Quarter-finals (best of 11 legs)
1	Matt Campbell 78.99	6
Keith Way 73.13	1
4	Chuck Puleo 82.44	4
12	Jacob Taylor 79.91	6
Danny Baggish 87.28	6
Jim Widmayer 80.61	1
Jeff Springer 84.50	6
Alex Spellman 85.31	3

Semi-finals (best of 13 legs)
1	Matt Campbell 86.79	7
12	Jacob Taylor 93.92	5
Danny Baggish 89.29	7
Jeff Springer 79.70	3

Final (best of 13 legs)
1	Matt Campbell 98.54	7
Danny Baggish 96.54	4

=== CDC Tour 2 ===
Tour 2 (also known as the Indianapolis 501) was contested on Saturday 14 May at American Legion Post 331, Brownsburg, United States. The tournament was won by Leonard Gates.

Quarter-finals (best of 11 legs)
16	Danny Baggish 95.30	5
Joey Lynaugh 93.60	6
4	Chuck Puleo 84.49	6
Jim Widmayer 87.50	4
15	David Cameron 95.73	4
7	Leonard Gates 92.67	6
3	Danny Lauby 88.67	5
11	John Norman Jnr 87.26	6

Semi-finals (best of 13 legs)
Joey Lynaugh 81.97	3
5	Chuck Puleo 88.75	7
7	Leonard Gates 95.24	7
11	John Norman Jnr 87.47	6

Final (best of 13 legs)
5	Chuck Puleo 96.32	5
7	Leonard Gates 97.04	7

=== CDC Tour 3 ===
Tour 3 was contested on Sunday 15 May at American Legion Post 331, Brownsburg, United States. The tournament was won by Danny Baggish.

Quarter-finals (best of 11 legs)
16	Danny Baggish 96.97	6
Kevin Luke 82.07	0
4	Chuck Puleo 93.21	6
Jeff Springer 92.58	4
Joey Lynaugh 79.73	4
10	John Norman Jnr 82.13	6
Robbie Phillips 83.00	1
6	Leonard Gates 91.94	6

Semi-finals (best of 13 legs)
16	Danny Baggish 91.86	7
4	Chuck Puleo 88.98	3
10	John Norman Jnr 85.82	4
6	Leonard Gates 85.28	7

Final (best of 13 legs)
16	Danny Baggish 88.24	7
6	Leonard Gates 82.60	5

== June ==
=== CDC Tour 4 ===
Tour 4 (also known as the Cosmo Classic) was contested on Saturday 25 June at Cambridge Newfoundland Club, Cambridge, Canada. The tournament was won by Jacob Taylor.

Quarter-finals (best of 11 legs)
Steve Warnock 87.64	6
4	Larry Butler 76.55	4
4	Leonard Gates 91.37	1
12	Jacob Taylor 86.15	6
Cashmere Ventura 83.29	4
10	Danny Baggish 83.13	6
Shaun Narain 88.16	6
Doug Boehm 79.59	1

Semi-finals (best of 13 legs)
Steve Warnock 83.36	3
12	Jacob Taylor 90.37	7
10	Danny Baggish 95.26	7
Shaun Narain 79.88	1

Final (best of 13 legs)
12	Jacob Taylor 88.77	7
10	Danny Baggish 90.76	6

=== CDC Tour 5 ===
Tour 5 (also known as the Boomerang Tours Fiesta) was contested on Saturday 25 June at Cambridge Newfoundland Club, Cambridge, Canada. The tournament was won by David Cameron.

Quarter-finals (best of 11 legs)
1	Matt Campbell 87.14	3
Keith Way 85.32	6
13	David Cameron 92.02	6
James Solek 70.81	0
2	Leonard Gates 96.37	6
7	Gary Mawson 84.26	3
Alex Spellman 94.67	5
6	Jacob Taylor 93.66	6

Semi-finals (best of 13 legs)
Keith Way 87.60	5
13	David Cameron 89.82	7
2	Leonard Gates 93.77	7
6	Jacob Taylor 90.85	6

Final (best of 13 legs)
13	David Cameron 97.10	7
2	Leonard Gates 96.80	3

=== CDC Tour 6 ===
Tour 6 (also known as the Magic Darts Masters) was contested on Sunday 26 June at Cambridge Newfoundland Club, Cambridge, Canada. The tournament was won by David Cameron.

Quarter-finals (best of 11 legs)
1	Matt Campbell 97.63	6
8	John Norman Jnr 91.55	2
4	Chuck Puleo 83.33	4
Jules van Dongen 82.57	6
2	Leonard Gates 97.37	6
7	Danny Baggish 90.18	1
3	Danny Lauby 89.74	1
11	David Cameron 98.16	6

Semi-finals (best of 13 legs)
1	Matt Campbell 91.17	7
Jules van Dongen 83.28	3
2	Leonard Gates 96.46	6
11	David Cameron 94.12	7

Final (best of 13 legs)
1	Matt Campbell 88.66	2
11	David Cameron 93.79	7

== August ==
=== CDC Tour 7 ===
Tour 7 (also known as the Cosmo Darts Challenge) was contested on Saturday 13 August 2022 at American Legion Post 331, Brownsburg, United States. The tournament was won by Jacob Taylor.

Quarter-finals (best of 11 legs)
16	Alex Spellman 102.56	6
8	John Norman Jnr 90.26	1
13	Kiley Edmunds 84.45	3
12	Larry Butler 84.92	6
2	Leonard Gates 91.93	4
7	Danny Baggish 93.06	6
Doug Boehm 89.58	4
6	Jacob Taylor 95.90	6

Semi-finals (best of 13 legs)
16	Alex Spellman 89.98	7
12	Larry Butler 86.00	1
7	Danny Baggish 82.75	3
6	Jacob Taylor 85.65	7

Final (best of 13 legs)
16	Alex Spellman 93.18	2
6	Jacob Taylor 90.30	7

=== CDC Tour 8 ===
Tour 8 was contested on Saturday 13 August 2022 at American Legion Post 331, Brownsburg, United States. The tournament was won by David Cameron.

Quarter-finals (best of 11 legs)
16	Nick Linberg 89.31	1
8	David Cameron 93.70	6
Jason Brandon 85.91	3
12	Gary Mawson 85.20	6
Jeff Springer 87.63	6
10	Larry Butler 85.52	3
14	Alex Spellman 101.12	6
6	Danny Baggish 99.81	5

Semi-finals (best of 13 legs)
8	David Cameron 87.87	7
12	Gary Mawson 83.27	3
Jeff Springer 89.56	5
14	Alex Spellman 87.90	7

Final (best of 13 legs)
8	David Cameron 84.69	7
14	Alex Spellman 85.33	3

=== CDC Tour 9 ===
Tour 9 (also known as the Galaxy Barrel Bash) was contested on Sunday 14 August 2022 at American Legion Post 331, Brownsburg, United States. The tournament was won by Larry Butler.

Quarter-finals (best of 11 legs)
Ryan Vander Weit 80.53	5
8	John Norman Jnr 81.99	6
13	Jason Brandon 84.70	2
12	Larry Butler 90.74	6
15	Nick Linberg 77.46	1
7	Danny Baggish 93.40	6
14	Alex Spellman 95.93	6
Ross Snook 80.76	3

Semi-finals (best of 13 legs)
8	John Norman Jnr 83.62	0
12	Larry Butler 89.16	7
7	Danny Baggish 88.44	7
14	Alex Spellman 89.72	6

Final (best of 13 legs)
12	Larry Butler 91.20	7
7	Danny Baggish 90.52	3

== September ==
=== CDC Tour 10 ===
Tour 10 (also known as the Magic Darts Derby) was contested on Saturday 10 September 2022 at Royal Canadian Legion Branch 551, Waterdown, Canada. The tournament was won by Danny Baggish.

Quarter-finals (best of 11 legs)
1	Matt Campbell 89.91	6
8	Gary Mawson 87.56	4
4	Danny Baggish 94.48	6
5	David Cameron 89.39	2
Stowe Buntz 98.24	6
10	Alex Spellman 94.99	1
3	Jacob Taylor 85.00	2
6	John Norman Jnr 90.21	6

Semi-finals (best of 13 legs)
1	Matt Campbell 95.60	5
4	Danny Baggish 98.84	7
Stowe Buntz 94.09	7
6	John Norman Jnr 92.13	5

Final (best of 13 legs)
4	Danny Baggish 90.89	7
Stowe Buntz 92.38	3

=== CDC Tour 11 ===
Tour 11 (also known as the Galaxy Gold Cup) was contested on Saturday 10 September 2022 at Royal Canadian Legion Branch 551, Waterdown, Canada. The tournament was won by Jim Long.

Quarter-finals (best of 11 legs)
Justin Fawcett 72.97	0
9	Jim Long 95.94	6
Ryan Vander Weit 83.57	3
5	David Cameron 91.25	6
2	Danny Baggish 94.66	6
10	Alex Spellman 96.64	5
3	Leonard Gates 96.16	3
Stowe Buntz 97.16	6

Semi-finals (best of 13 legs)
9	Jim Long 79.95	7
5	David Cameron 80.45	5
2	Danny Baggish 82.60	2
Stowe Buntz 90.18	7

Final (best of 13 legs)
9	Jim Long 80.28	7
Stowe Buntz 75.08	3

=== CDC Tour 12 ===
Tour 12 (also known as the 9/11 Memorial) was contested on Sunday 11 September 2022 at Royal Canadian Legion Branch 551, Waterdown, Canada. The tournament was won by Jacob Taylor.

Quarter-finals (best of 11 legs)
1	Danny Baggish 90.32	5
8	Jim Long 90.70	6
4	Jacob Taylor 92.27	6
5	David Cameron 94.12	4
Stowe Buntz 90.60	4
10	Gary Mawson 89.68	6
14	Ross Snook 90.52	5
6	John Norman Jnr 92.84	6

Semi-finals (best of 13 legs)
8	Jim Long 98.98	4
4	Jacob Taylor 97.88	7
10	Gary Mawson 92.84	7
6	John Norman Jnr 94.08	6

Final (best of 13 legs)
4	Jacob Taylor 90.13	7
10	Gary Mawson 91.30	5
