= 2022 PDC Pro Tour =

Darts tournament

The 2022 PDC Pro Tour was a series of non-televised darts tournaments organised by the Professional Darts Corporation (PDC). Players Championships and European Tour events are the events that make up the Pro Tour. There were thirty Players Championship events and thirteen PDC European Tour events, and after the split format last year, the Challenge and Development Tours returned as one big tour, rather than a UK/European split tour.

== Prize money ==
The prize money for the Players Championship events rose from 2021 levels, with each event having a prize fund of £100,000.

This is how the prize money is divided:

Stage	ET	PC	CT/DT	WS
Winner	£25,000	£12,000	£2,000	£1,000
Runner-up	£10,000	£8,000	£1,000	£600
Semi-finalists	£6,500	£4,000	£500	£400
Quarter-finalists	£5,000	£3,000	£300	£250
Last 16	£3,000	£2,000	£200	£100
Last 32	£2,000	£1,250	£100	£50
Last 48	£1,000	N/A	N/A	N/A
Last 64	N/A	£750	£50	N/A
Total	£140,000	£100,000	£10,000	£5,000

== PDC Tour Card ==
128 players are granted Tour Cards, which enables them to participate in all Players Championships events, the UK Open and qualifiers for all European Tour and select televised events.

=== Tour cards ===
The 2022 Tour Cards are awarded to:

- (64) The top 64 players from the PDC Order of Merit after the 2022 World Championship.
- (24) 24 qualifiers from 2021 Q-School not ranked in the top 64 of the PDC Order of Merit following the World Championship.
  - Robert Marijanović and Kirk Shepherd resigned their Tour Cards after one year.
- (2) Two highest qualifiers from 2020 Challenge Tour (David Evans and Ritchie Edhouse).
- (2) Two highest qualifiers from 2020 Development Tour (Keane Barry and Berry van Peer).
- (1) The winner of the 2021 UK Challenge Tour (Jim Williams).
- (1) The winner of the 2021 European Challenge Tour (Matt Campbell).
- (1) The winner of the 2021 UK Development Tour (Bradley Brooks).
- (1) The winner of the 2021 European Development Tour (Rusty-Jake Rodriguez).
- (8) The daily winners from the 2022 Qualifying Schools.

Afterwards, the playing field will be complemented by the highest qualified players from the Q-School Order of Merit until the maximum number of 128 Pro Tour Card players has been reached. In 2022, that means that a total of 24 additional players will qualify this way.

=== Q-School ===
The PDC Pro Tour Qualifying School (or Q-School) was split into a UK and European Q-School. Players that are not from Europe can choose which Q-School they want to compete in.

Q-School was once again be split into two stages; with all players who lost their tour cards after the 2022 World Championship and the players who finished from second to fourth in the 2021 Challenge Tour and Development Tour Orders of Merit exempted to the final stage. The first stage consisted a block of three days, with the last eight players on each day qualifying into the final stage. A ranking of other players was also be produced with players qualifying via that ranking to produce a full list of 128 players for each final stage.

Stage One took place between 9–11 January; with the Final Stage held between 12 and 15 January. The winner of each day's play in the Final Stage were given a PDC Tour Card.

The UK Q-School was held at the Arena MK, Milton Keynes, England; with the European Q-School held at the H+ Hotel, Niedernhausen, Germany.

UK Q-School
January 12	January 13	January 14	January 15
James Wilson (ENG)	Darren Webster (ENG)	Ross Montgomery (SCO)	Josh Rock (NIR)
128 players	127 players	125 players	119 players
European Q-School
January 12	January 13	January 14	January 15
José Justicia (ESP)	Brian Raman (BEL)	Luc Peters (NED)	Krzysztof Kciuk (POL)
128 players	125 players	121 players	110 players

An Order of Merit was created for each Q School. For every win after the Last 64, the players will be awarded 1 point.

To complete the field of 128 Tour Card Holders, places were allocated down the final Q-School Order of Merits in proportion to the number of participants, with 13 cards going to the UK Q-School and 11 going to the European Q-School.

The following players picked up Tour Cards as a result:

UK Q-School Order of Merit

1. Jamie Clark (SCO)
2. Ted Evetts (ENG)
3. Connor Scutt (ENG)
4. Richie Burnett (WAL)
5. Kevin Burness (NIR)
6. Scott Waites (ENG)
7. Nathan Rafferty (NIR)
8. Cameron Menzies (SCO)
9. John O'Shea (IRL)
10. George Killington (ENG)
11. Mickey Mansell (NIR)
12. Nick Fullwell (ENG)
13. Shaun Wilkinson (ENG)

European Q-School Order of Merit

1. Mario Vandenbogaerde (BEL)
2. Jules van Dongen (USA)
3. Kevin Doets (NED)
4. Tony Martinez (ESP)
5. Danny Jansen (NED)
6. Radek Szagański (POL)
7. Damian Mol (NED)
8. Jimmy Hendriks (NED)
9. Ricardo Pietreczko (GER)
10. Vladimir Andersen (DEN)
11. Rowby-John Rodriguez (AUT)

== Players Championships ==
Following the Super Series events in the last 18 months, the Players Championship events returned to normal in 2022 with 30 events taking place.

No.	Date	Venue	Winner	Legs	Runner-up	Ref.
1	Saturday 5 February	Barnsley Metrodome, (England) Barnsley	Luke Humphries (100.55)	8 – 4	Ryan Searle (94.05)	
2	Sunday 6 February	Barnsley Metrodome, (England) Barnsley	Peter Wright (95.36)	8 – 5	Gerwyn Price (96.55)	
3	Saturday 12 February	Robin Park Sports Centre, (England) Wigan	Joe Cullen (95.35)	8 – 4	Damon Heta (99.37)	
4	Sunday 13 February	Robin Park Sports Centre, (England) Wigan	Joe Cullen (102.34)	8 – 1	Dimitri Van den Bergh (95.06)	
5	Saturday 19 March	Barnsley Metrodome, (England) Barnsley	Damon Heta (107.27)	8 – 6	Gary Anderson (103.42)	
6	Sunday 20 March	Barnsley Metrodome, (England) Barnsley	Jim Williams (89.92)	8 – 6	Ricky Evans (85.79)	
7	Saturday 26 March	H+ Hotel, (Germany) Niedernhausen	Gerwyn Price (101.02)	8 – 4	Madars Razma (93.05)	
8	Sunday 27 March	H+ Hotel, (Germany) Niedernhausen	Michael van Gerwen (102.42)	8 – 4	Martin Schindler (98.60)	
9	Friday 1 April	Barnsley Metrodome, (England) Barnsley	Danny Jansen (95.51)	8 – 6	Andrew Gilding (95.37)	
10	Saturday 2 April	Barnsley Metrodome, (England) Barnsley	Michael van Gerwen (96.59)	8 – 4	Peter Wright (97.82)	
11	Sunday 3 April	Barnsley Metrodome, (England) Barnsley	Ryan Searle (103.02)	8 – 3	Nathan Aspinall (100.88)	
12	Saturday 9 April	Barnsley Metrodome, (England) Barnsley	Dirk van Duijvenbode (98.04)	8 – 7	Ryan Searle (104.05)	
13	Sunday 10 April	Barnsley Metrodome, (England) Barnsley	Nathan Aspinall (96.41)	8 – 6	Matt Campbell (91.41)	
14	Tuesday 10 May	Robin Park Sports Centre, (England) Wigan	Michael Smith (101.39)	8 – 5	John O'Shea (93.81)	
15	Wednesday 11 May	Robin Park Sports Centre, (England) Wigan	Michael Smith (109.95)	8 – 3	Callan Rydz (104.13)	
16	Tuesday 14 June	H+ Hotel, (Germany) Niedernhausen	Michael Smith (105.58)	8 – 6	Dirk van Duijvenbode (107.29)	
17	Wednesday 15 June	H+ Hotel, (Germany) Niedernhausen	Scott Williams (91.79)	8 – 5	Nathan Aspinall (86.50)	
18	Friday 8 July	Barnsley Metrodome, (England) Barnsley	Dirk van Duijvenbode (100.20)	8 – 0	Gabriel Clemens (90.63)	
19	Saturday 9 July	Barnsley Metrodome, (England) Barnsley	Danny Noppert (96.86)	8 – 6	Andrew Gilding (98.67)	
20	Sunday 10 July	Barnsley Metrodome, (England) Barnsley	Adrian Lewis (103.02)	8 – 4	Boris Koltsov (92.73) (Note: Boris Koltsov, of Russia, has competed under a neutral designation since the 2022 Russian invasion of Ukraine.)	
21	Monday 11 July	Barnsley Metrodome, (England) Barnsley	Brendan Dolan (97.10)	8 – 5	Jonny Clayton (95.52)	
22	Wednesday 3 August	Barnsley Metrodome, (England) Barnsley	Nathan Aspinall (97.18)	8 – 3	Krzysztof Ratajski (91.37)	
23	Thursday 4 August	Barnsley Metrodome, (England) Barnsley	Keegan Brown (93.87)	8 – 7	Nathan Aspinall (89.05)	
24	Friday 5 August	Barnsley Metrodome, (England) Barnsley	Rob Cross (98.87)	8 – 3	Luke Humphries (97.41)	
25	Thursday 20 October	Barnsley Metrodome, (England) Barnsley	Dave Chisnall (100.63)	8 – 4	Josh Rock (97.15)	
26	Friday 21 October	Barnsley Metrodome, (England) Barnsley	Damon Heta (103.52)	8 – 4	Dirk van Duijvenbode (90.68)	
27	Saturday 22 October	Barnsley Metrodome, (England) Barnsley	Rob Cross (94.10)	8 – 4	Peter Wright (96.63)	
28	Sunday 23 October	Barnsley Metrodome, (England) Barnsley	Josh Rock (108.07)	8 – 5	Luke Humphries (102.96)	
29	Friday 4 November	Barnsley Metrodome, (England) Barnsley	Gerwyn Price (102.25)	8 – 4	Gian van Veen (94.37)	
30	Saturday 5 November	Barnsley Metrodome, (England) Barnsley	James Wade (94.82)	8 – 6	Steve Beaton (93.99)	

== European Tour ==
The PDC European Tour returned to the pre-pandemic level of 13 events, having been reduced to four events in 2020, and just two in 2021. On 9 February 2022, the Belgian Darts Open, originally scheduled for 25–27 March was rescheduled to 23–25 September, owing to COVID-19 restrictions in Belgium.

No.	Date	Event	Location	Winner	Legs	Runner-up	Ref.
1	25–27 February	International Darts Open	(Germany) Riesa, SACHSENarena	Gerwyn Price (106.95)	8 – 4	Peter Wright (106.74)	
2	11–13 March	German Darts Championship	(Germany) Hildesheim, Halle 39	Michael van Gerwen (104.08)	8 – 5	Rob Cross (101.53)	
3	16–18 April	German Darts Grand Prix	(Germany) Munich, Kulturhalle Zenith	Luke Humphries (92.07)	8 – 2	Martin Lukeman (83.87)	
4	29 April–1 May	Austrian Darts Open	(Austria) Premstätten, Steiermarkhalle	Michael van Gerwen (98.78)	8 – 5	Danny Noppert (89.30)	
5	6–8 May	European Darts Open	(Germany) Leverkusen, Ostermann-Arena	Michael van Gerwen (102.49)	8 – 5	Dimitri Van den Bergh (89.54)	
6	13–15 May	Czech Darts Open	(Czech Republic) Prague, Královka Arena	Luke Humphries (100.34)	8 – 5	Rob Cross (94.41)	
7	20–22 May	European Darts Grand Prix	(Germany) Stuttgart, Hanns-Martin-Schleyer-Halle	Luke Humphries (102.33)	8 – 7	Rob Cross (101.82)	
8	27–29 May	Dutch Darts Championship	(Netherlands) Zwolle, IJsselhallen	Michael Smith (99.44)	8 – 7	Danny Noppert (96.78)	
9	1–3 July	European Darts Matchplay	(Germany) Trier, Trier Arena	Luke Humphries (97.26)	8 – 7	Rowby-John Rodriguez (91.22)	
10	2–4 September	Hungarian Darts Trophy	(Hungary) Budapest, BOK Sportcsarnok	Joe Cullen (97.59)	8 – 2	William O'Connor (89.15)	
11	9–11 September	German Darts Open	(Germany) Jena, Sparkassen-Arena	Peter Wright (99.75)	8 – 6	Dimitri Van den Bergh (92.74)	
12	23–25 September	Belgian Darts Open	(Belgium) Wieze, Oktoberhallen	Dave Chisnall (92.31)	8 – 6	Andrew Gilding (89.69)	
13	14–16 October	Gibraltar Darts Trophy	Gibraltar, Victoria Stadium	Damon Heta (92.15)	8 – 7	Peter Wright (92.37)	

== PDC Challenge Tour ==
Following the split into UK and European Challenge Tours in 2021, the Challenge Tour became one again in 2022, with 4 weekends of 5 events, and 1 weekend of 4 events. The top 2 players on the Order of Merit earned a PDC Tour Card and a place at the 2023 PDC World Darts Championship, while the winner of the Order of Merit earned a spot at the 2022 Grand Slam of Darts as well.

Final Challenge Tour ranking
Rank	Player	Earnings
1	Scott Williams (Note: Qualified for 2023 PDC World Darts Championship via another method.) (Note: Qualified for 2023 Tour Card via another method.)	£9,850
2	Robert Owen	£6,200
3	Danny van Trijp	£5,950
4	Stephen Burton	£5,300
5	Jurjen van der Velde	£5,150
6	Thibault Tricole	£5,100
7	Karel Sedláček	£4,900
8	David Pallett	£4,700
9	Christian Kist	£4,300
10	Gian van Veen	£4,100

No.	Date	Venue	Winner	Legs	Runner-up	Ref.
1	Friday 21 January	Marshall Arena, (England) Milton Keynes	Scott Williams (88.81)	5 – 2	Robert Owen (89.54)	
2	Friday 21 January	Marshall Arena, (England) Milton Keynes	Scott Williams (95.83)	5 – 2	Lee Evans (87.97)	
3	Saturday 22 January	Marshall Arena, (England) Milton Keynes	Steve Haggerty (81.44)	5 – 4	Haupai Puha (90.74)	
4	Saturday 22 January	Marshall Arena, (England) Milton Keynes	Stu Wilson (93.85)	5 – 3	Peter Burgoyne (85.10)	
5	Sunday 23 January	Marshall Arena, (England) Milton Keynes	Jim McEwan (97.60)	5 – 0	Stephen Burton (87.00)	
6	Friday 1 April	Halle 39, (Germany) Hildesheim	Scott Williams (94.28)	5 – 4	Scott Marsh (92.35)	
7	Friday 1 April	Halle 39, (Germany) Hildesheim	Stefan Bellmont (87.94)	5 – 4	Karel Sedláček (87.87)	
8	Saturday 2 April	Halle 39, (Germany) Hildesheim	Stephen Burton (95.13)	5 – 0	Danny van Trijp (82.62)	
9	Saturday 2 April	Halle 39, (Germany) Hildesheim	Danny van Trijp (92.59)	5 – 2	Lukas Wenig (85.25)	
10	Sunday 3 April	Halle 39, (Germany) Hildesheim	Andy Jenkins (94.27)	5 – 3	Karel Sedláček (84.74)	
11	Friday 15 July	Halle 39, (Germany) Hildesheim	Danny van Trijp (95.86)	5 – 2	Jelle Klaasen (92.19)	
12	Friday 15 July	Halle 39, (Germany) Hildesheim	Gian van Veen (97.81)	5 – 4	David Pallett (88.02)	
13	Saturday 16 July	Halle 39, (Germany) Hildesheim	Jurjen van der Velde (92.79)	5 – 3	Robert Owen (88.27)	
14	Saturday 16 July	Halle 39, (Germany) Hildesheim	Kenny Neyens (82.54)	5 – 4	Michael Flynn (81.28)	
15	Sunday 17 July	Halle 39, (Germany) Hildesheim	David Pallett (95.38)	5 – 3	Dennie Olde Kalter (90.23)	
16	Friday 16 September	Morningside Arena, (England) Leicester	Robert Owen (94.46)	5 – 2	Christian Kist (85.98)	
17	Friday 16 September	Morningside Arena, (England) Leicester	Wesley Plaisier (90.34)	5 – 3	Robert Thornton (86.87)	
18	Saturday 17 September	Morningside Arena, (England) Leicester	Jurjen van der Velde (89.06)	5 – 4	Patrick Peters (86.36)	
19	Saturday 17 September	Morningside Arena, (England) Leicester	Christian Kist (79.87)	5 – 3	Danny Lauby (82.45)	
20	Sunday 18 September	Morningside Arena, (England) Leicester	Scott Williams (91.00)	5 – 2	Thibault Tricole (77.89)	
21	Saturday 15 October	Morningside Arena, (England) Leicester	Thibault Tricole (94.16)	5 – 3	Gian van Veen (86.13)	
22	Saturday 15 October	Morningside Arena, (England) Leicester	Jacques Labre (87.82)	5 – 3	Lee Evans (88.35)	
23	Sunday 16 October	Morningside Arena, (England) Leicester	Justin Smith (83.42)	5 – 2	Matthew Dennant (82.68)	
24	Sunday 16 October	Morningside Arena, (England) Leicester	Andy Hamilton (89.27)	5 – 4	Scott Taylor (90.19)	

== PDC Development Tour ==
Following the split into UK and European Development Tours in 2021, the Development Tour became one again in 2022, with 4 weekends of 5 events, and 1 weekend of 4 events. The top 2 players on the Order of Merit get a PDC Tour Card and a place at the 2023 PDC World Darts Championship, meanwhile the winner of the Order of Merit gets a spot at the 2022 Grand Slam of Darts as well.

Final Development Tour ranking
Rank	Player	Earnings
1	Nathan Rafferty (Note: Qualified for 2023 Tour Card via another method.) (Note: Qualified for 2022 Grand Slam of Darts via another method.)	£14,200
2	Josh Rock (Note: Qualified for 2023 PDC World Darts Championship via another method.)	£13,650
3	Keane Barry	£9,950
4	Lewy Williams	£8,500
5	Geert Nentjes	£8,450
6	Jurjen van der Velde	£7,100
7	Nathan Girvan	£6,750
8	Kevin Doets	£6,500
9	Sebastian Białecki	£6,300
10	Bradley Brooks	£5,700

No.	Date	Venue	Winner	Legs	Runner-up	Ref.
1	Friday 18 February	Robin Park Tennis Centre, (England) Wigan	Bradley Brooks (88.57)	5 – 1	Christopher Holt (76.30)	
2	Friday 18 February	Robin Park Tennis Centre, (England) Wigan	Keane Barry (93.14)	5 – 4	Conor Heneghan (85.85)	
3	Saturday 19 February	Robin Park Tennis Centre, (England) Wigan	Josh Rock (94.57)	5 – 4	Lewy Williams (97.06)	
4	Saturday 19 February	Robin Park Tennis Centre, (England) Wigan	Kevin Doets (95.06)	5 – 3	Josh Rock (93.29)	
5	Sunday 20 February	Robin Park Tennis Centre, (England) Wigan	Josh Rock (94.14)	5 – 3	Nathan Girvan (93.66)	
6	Friday 6 May	Robin Park Tennis Centre, (England) Wigan	Nathan Rafferty (88.83)	5 – 4	Lewy Williams (90.18)	
7	Friday 6 May	Robin Park Tennis Centre, (England) Wigan	Jurjen van der Velde (81.28)	5 – 1	Geert Nentjes (81.03)	
8	Saturday 7 May	Robin Park Tennis Centre, (England) Wigan	Conor Heneghan (87.78)	5 – 1	Jitse van der Wal (85.52)	
9	Saturday 7 May	Robin Park Tennis Centre, (England) Wigan	Nathan Girvan (99.21)	5 – 2	Nathan Rafferty (85.06)	
10	Sunday 8 May	Robin Park Tennis Centre, (England) Wigan	Geert Nentjes (90.09)	5 – 1	Jitse van der Wal (73.11)	
11	Friday 3 June	Halle 39, (Germany) Hildesheim	Nathan Rafferty (96.17)	5 – 4	Gian van Veen (92.53)	
12	Friday 3 June	Halle 39, (Germany) Hildesheim	Keane Barry (93.94)	5 – 0	Ciarán Teehan (81.16)	
13	Saturday 4 June	Halle 39, (Germany) Hildesheim	Geert Nentjes (91.41)	5 – 1	Niko Springer (85.17)	
14	Saturday 4 June	Halle 39, (Germany) Hildesheim	Sebastian Białecki (92.71)	5 – 3	Keane Barry (84.80)	
15	Sunday 5 June	Halle 39, (Germany) Hildesheim	Keane Barry (95.85)	5 – 3	Owen Bates (91.01)	
16	Friday 19 August	Halle 39, (Germany) Hildesheim	Josh Rock (112.16)	5 – 0	Dylan Dowling (85.38)	
17	Friday 19 August	Halle 39, (Germany) Hildesheim	Josh Rock (104.38)	5 – 0	Nathan Girvan (79.14)	
18	Saturday 20 August	Halle 39, (Germany) Hildesheim	Gian van Veen (95.93)	5 – 4	Josh Rock (95.30)	
19	Saturday 20 August	Halle 39, (Germany) Hildesheim	Lewy Williams (86.47)	5 – 4	Kevin Doets (89.48)	
20	Sunday 21 August	Halle 39, (Germany) Hildesheim	Nathan Rafferty (84.66)	5 – 2	Kevin Doets (86.10)	
21	Friday 7 October	Robin Park Tennis Centre, (England) Wigan	Josh Rock (95.85)	5 – 2	Rusty-Jake Rodriguez (86.02)	
22	Friday 7 October	Robin Park Tennis Centre, (England) Wigan	Nathan Rafferty (97.82)	5 – 3	Niko Springer (93.47)	
23	Saturday 8 October	Robin Park Tennis Centre, (England) Wigan	Nathan Rafferty (91.57)	5 – 2	Lewy Williams (87.83)	
24	Saturday 8 October	Robin Park Tennis Centre, (England) Wigan	Joshua Richardson (81.76)	5 – 4	Jurjen van der Velde (86.70)	

== PDC Women's Series ==
The PDC Women's Series was expanded to 20 events held over five weekends.

The top two ranked players qualify for the 2023 PDC World Darts Championship, meanwhile the Order of Merit leader after all events qualifies for the 2022 Grand Slam of Darts as well. The top eight ranked players (after 12 events) qualified for the first edition of the Women's World Matchplay in 2022.

Final Women's Series Order of Merit
Rank	Player	Earnings
1	Lisa Ashton	£10,150
2	Beau Greaves	£8,000
3	Fallon Sherrock	£6,950
4	Lorraine Winstanley	£5,050
5	Aileen de Graaf	£4,800
6	Mikuru Suzuki	£4,550
7	Katie Sheldon	£3,400
8	Laura Turner	£2,950
9	Rhian Griffiths	£2,850
10	Rhian O'Sullivan	£2,200

No.	Date	Venue	Winner	Legs	Runner-up	Ref.
1	Saturday 12 March	Barnsley Metrodome, (England) Barnsley	Lisa Ashton (78.14)	5 – 2	Rhian Griffiths (76.50)	
2	Saturday 12 March	Barnsley Metrodome, (England) Barnsley	Lisa Ashton (80.14)	5 – 3	Robyn Byrne (74.72)	
3	Sunday 13 March	Barnsley Metrodome, (England) Barnsley	Fallon Sherrock (85.64)	5 – 3	Jo Locke (80.47)	
4	Sunday 13 March	Barnsley Metrodome, (England) Barnsley	Lisa Ashton (91.25)	5 – 4	Fallon Sherrock (94.41)	
5	Saturday 30 April	Robin Park Tennis Centre, (England) Wigan	Trina Gulliver (80.81)	5 – 1	Laura Turner (74.51)	
6	Saturday 30 April	Robin Park Tennis Centre, (England) Wigan	Lisa Ashton (75.98)	5 – 2	Laura Turner (70.26)	
7	Sunday 1 May	Robin Park Tennis Centre, (England) Wigan	Fallon Sherrock (85.69)	5 – 1	Lisa Ashton (81.92)	
8	Sunday 1 May	Robin Park Tennis Centre, (England) Wigan	Lisa Ashton (79.05)	5 – 2	Katie Sheldon (74.58)	
9	Saturday 25 June	Barnsley Metrodome, (England) Barnsley	Lisa Ashton (79.07)	5 – 1	Aileen de Graaf (81.69)	
10	Saturday 25 June	Barnsley Metrodome, (England) Barnsley	Lorraine Winstanley (71.83)	5 – 4	Rhian O'Sullivan (74.12)	
11	Sunday 26 June	Barnsley Metrodome, (England) Barnsley	Fallon Sherrock (85.70)	5 – 3	Natalie Gilbert (76.76)	
12	Sunday 26 June	Barnsley Metrodome, (England) Barnsley	Lisa Ashton (85.36)	5 – 2	Aileen de Graaf (83.07)	
13	Saturday 27 August	Halle 39, (Germany) Hildesheim	Beau Greaves (84.98)	5 – 1	Mikuru Suzuki (77.91)	
14	Saturday 27 August	Halle 39, (Germany) Hildesheim	Beau Greaves (94.21)	5 – 2	Mikuru Suzuki (88.64)	
15	Sunday 28 August	Halle 39, (Germany) Hildesheim	Beau Greaves (95.47)	5 – 3	Mikuru Suzuki (92.22)	
16	Sunday 28 August	Halle 39, (Germany) Hildesheim	Beau Greaves (82.99)	5 – 3	Aileen de Graaf (75.90)	
17	Saturday 29 October	Robin Park Tennis Centre, (England) Wigan	Beau Greaves (88.81)	5 – 3	Mikuru Suzuki (85.87)	
18	Saturday 29 October	Robin Park Tennis Centre, (England) Wigan	Beau Greaves (88.06)	5 – 4	Lisa Ashton (87.65)	
19	Sunday 30 October	Robin Park Tennis Centre, (England) Wigan	Beau Greaves (107.86)	5 – 3	Fallon Sherrock (89.86)	
20	Sunday 30 October	Robin Park Tennis Centre, (England) Wigan	Beau Greaves (88.12)	5 – 1	Mikuru Suzuki (73.69)	

== Professional Darts Corporation Nordic & Baltic (PDCNB) Tour ==
On 26 November 2021, the PDCNB unveiled their 2022 calendar, which is set to include 5 weekends, incorporating 2 weekends in Denmark, and one weekend each in Sweden, Finland and Latvia, although the Sweden weekend will be purely held for European Tour qualifiers. The top two players on the Order of merit qualify for the 2023 PDC World Darts Championship.

Final PDCNB Order of Merit
Rank	Player	Points
1	Darius Labanauskas	6825
2	Daniel Larsson	4425
3	Vladimir Andersen	3575
4	Madars Razma	3125
5	Marko Kantele	2650
6	Dennis Nilsson	2500
7	Andreas Harrysson	2200
8	Benjamin Drue Reus	1675
9	Andreas Toft Jørgensen	1150
10	Veijo Viinikka	1100

No.	Date	Venue	Winner	Legs	Runner-up	Ref.
1	Saturday 29 January	Slangerup Dart Club, (Denmark) Slangerup	Vladimir Andersen (86.93)	6 – 5	Daniel Larsson (87.75)	
2	Sunday 30 January	Slangerup Dart Club, (Denmark) Slangerup	Madars Razma (87.21)	6 – 4	Darius Labanauskas (87.40)	
3	Saturday 4 June	Hotelli Tallukka, (Finland) Vääksy	Darius Labanauskas (85.30)	6 – 3	Marko Kantele (77.10)	
4	Sunday 5 June	Hotelli Tallukka, (Finland) Vääksy	Dennis Nilsson (82.10)	6 – 1	Madars Razma (79.72)	
5	Saturday 30 July	Slangerup Dart Club, (Denmark) Slangerup	Andreas Harrysson (92.04)	6 – 3	Darius Labanauskas (87.35)	
6	Sunday 31 July	Slangerup Dart Club, (Denmark) Slangerup	Daniel Larsson (84.05)	6 – 4	Vladimir Andersen (77.12)	
7	Friday 12 August	Bellevue Park Hotel, (Latvia) Riga	Darius Labanauskas (94.82)	6 – 2	Veijo Viinikka (82.88)	
8	Saturday 13 August	Bellevue Park Hotel, (Latvia) Riga	Darius Labanauskas (83.41)	6 – 4	Daniel Larsson (84.60)	
9	Saturday 13 August	Bellevue Park Hotel, (Latvia) Riga	Darius Labanauskas (90.45)	6 – 1	Vladimir Andersen (81.83)	
10	Sunday 14 August	Bellevue Park Hotel, (Latvia) Riga	Marko Kantele (88.73)	6 – 4	Daniel Larsson (88.68)	

== Dartplayers Australia (DPA) Pro Tour ==
The Dartplayers Australia Tour was modified once again to reduce the amount of travel required within the context of the global pandemic. The original format was that every event would consist of five state round robin rounds. After which an online 32 player knockout round would be played. After the first event there were technical difficulties with the online knockout round. It was then decided that every state event would be played out with separate knockout stages. With the top 16 from every state after all 15 events qualifying for the Australasian Championships.

=== Online Knockout Event ===
No.	Date	Winner	Legs	Runner-up	Ref.
1	Friday 11 February	(85.38) Tim Pusey	6 – 3	David Littleboy (73.88)	

=== New South Wales ===
No.	Date	Venue	Winner	Legs	Runner-up	Ref.
2	Saturday 12 February	Warilla Bowls Club, (New South Wales) Barrack Heights	(69.83) Jake Buckley	5 – 4	Daniel Pearson (66.95)	
3	Sunday 13 February	Warilla Bowls Club, (New South Wales) Barrack Heights	(67.69) Mark Taafe	6 – 3	David Cairns (67.12)	
4	Friday 11 March	Warilla Bowls Club, (New South Wales) Barrack Heights	(90.53) Dave Hanel	6 – 2	Pat Molloy (79.92)	
5	Saturday 12 March	Warilla Bowls Club, (New South Wales) Barrack Heights	(80.64) Jamie Browne	6 – 3	Dave Hanel (72.43)	
6	Sunday 13 March	Warilla Bowls Club, (New South Wales) Barrack Heights	(69.49) Mitchell Clegg	6 – 5	David Cairns (68.77)	
7	Friday 8 April	Warilla Bowls Club, (New South Wales) Barrack Heights	(83.34) Dave Marland	6 – 5	Mark Taafe (78.34)	
8	Saturday 9 April	Warilla Bowls Club, (New South Wales) Barrack Heights	(79.46) Mitchell Clegg	6 – 4	Dave Hanel (81.12)	
9	Sunday 10 April	Warilla Bowls Club, (New South Wales) Barrack Heights	(73.57) Dave Marland	6 – 3	Mark Taafe (69.17)	
10	Friday 13 May	Warilla Bowls Club, (New South Wales) Barrack Heights	(81.98) Dave Hanel	6 – 5	Jamie Browne (80.36)	
11	Saturday 14 May	Warilla Bowls Club, (New South Wales) Barrack Heights	(83.98) Dave Marland	6 – 4	Daniel Pearson (76.52)	
12	Sunday 15 May	Warilla Bowls Club, (New South Wales) Barrack Heights	(78.32) Dave Marland	6 – 5	Dave Hanel (78.14)	
13	Friday 10 June	Warilla Bowls Club, (New South Wales) Barrack Heights	(82.73) Dave Marland	6 – 0	Dave Hanel (69.72)	
14	Saturday 11 June	Warilla Bowls Club, (New South Wales) Barrack Heights	(76.31) Matt Liddall	6 – 3	Andrew Eagers (66.14)	
15	Sunday 12 June	Warilla Bowls Club, (New South Wales) Barrack Heights	(77.83) Dave Hanel	6 – 2	David Cairns (76.45)	

=== Queensland ===
No.	Date	Venue	Winner	Legs	Runner-up	Ref.
2	Saturday 12 February	Surfers Paradise Golf Club, (Queensland) Clear Island Waters	(84.64) Raymond O'Donnell	6 – 4	Robbie King (76.91)	
3	Sunday 13 February	Surfers Paradise Golf Club, (Queensland) Clear Island Waters	(92.44) Raymond Smith	6 – 4	Robbie King (82.88)	
4	Friday 11 March	Surfers Paradise Golf Club, (Queensland) Clear Island Waters	(91.09) Raymond Smith	6 – 2	Robbie King (89.15)	
5	Saturday 12 March	Surfers Paradise Golf Club, (Queensland) Clear Island Waters	(86.76) Raymond Smith	6 – 3	Jeremy Fagg (81.97)	
6	Sunday 13 March	Surfers Paradise Golf Club, (Queensland) Clear Island Waters	(96.92) Raymond Smith	6 – 2	Robbie King (92.04)	
7	Friday 8 April	North Lakes Community Centre, (Queensland) North Lakes	Cancelled			
8	Saturday 9 April	North Lakes Community Centre, (Queensland) North Lakes	Cancelled			
9	Sunday 10 April	North Lakes Community Centre, (Queensland) North Lakes	Cancelled			
10	Friday 13 May	North Lakes Community Centre, (Queensland) North Lakes	(89.36) Robbie King	6 – 2	James Bailey (78.05)	
11	Saturday 14 May	North Lakes Community Centre, (Queensland) North Lakes	(75.93) Peter Willmott	6 – 5	Robbie King (77.01)	
12	Sunday 15 May	North Lakes Community Centre, (Queensland) North Lakes	(88.59) Robbie King	6 – 2	James Bailey (78.84)	
13	Friday 24 June	Surfers Paradise Golf Club, (Queensland) Clear Island Waters	(83.94) Peter Willmott	6 – 3	Matthew McLennan (78.04)	
14	Saturday 25 June	Surfers Paradise Golf Club, (Queensland) Clear Island Waters	(83.05) Bill Aitken	6 – 3	Matthew McLennan (81.77)	
15	Sunday 26 June	Surfers Paradise Golf Club, (Queensland) Clear Island Waters	(83.04) Bill Aitken	6 – 3	Matthew McLennan (76.90)	

=== Western Australia ===
No.	Date	Venue	Winner	Legs	Runner-up	Ref.
2	Saturday 12 February	Port Kennedy Tavern, (Western Australia) Port Kennedy	(89.70) Tim Pusey	6 – 2	Justin Miles (83.48)	
3	Sunday 13 February	Port Kennedy Tavern, (Western Australia) Port Kennedy	(69.19) Bailey Marsh	6 – 2	Dave Burke (71.19)	
4	Friday 11 March	Port Kennedy Tavern, (Western Australia) Port Kennedy	(89.53) Bailey Marsh	6 – 5	Joe Comito (81.10)	
5	Saturday 12 March	Port Kennedy Tavern, (Western Australia) Port Kennedy	(88.70) David Platt	6 – 2	Tim Pusey (83.18)	
6	Sunday 13 March	Port Kennedy Tavern, (Western Australia) Port Kennedy	(82.44) Bailey Marsh	6 – 3	Brenton Lloyd (80.54)	
7	Friday 8 April	Port Kennedy Tavern, (Western Australia) Port Kennedy	(78.50) Justin Miles	6 – 5	David Platt (76.79)	
8	Saturday 9 April	Port Kennedy Tavern, (Western Australia) Port Kennedy	(91.52) David Platt	6 – 2	Howard Jones (84.32)	
9	Sunday 10 April	Port Kennedy Tavern, (Western Australia) Port Kennedy	(79.72) Justin Miles	6 – 4	Bailey Marsh (83.59)	
10	Friday 13 May	Port Kennedy Tavern, (Western Australia) Port Kennedy	(100.24) Justin Miles	6 – 1	David Platt (90.09)	
11	Saturday 14 May	Port Kennedy Tavern, (Western Australia) Port Kennedy	(92.23) Howard Jones	6 – 3	Tim Pusey (86.36)	
12	Sunday 15 May	Port Kennedy Tavern, (Western Australia) Port Kennedy	(85.71) Justin Miles	6 – 2	Joe Comito (82.40)	
13	Friday 10 June	Port Kennedy Tavern, (Western Australia) Port Kennedy	(77.06) Koha Kokiri	6 – 4	Dave Burke (74.51)	
14	Saturday 11 June	Port Kennedy Tavern, (Western Australia) Port Kennedy	(73.23) Blake Hatchett	6 – 5	Brenton Lloyd (71.27)	
15	Sunday 12 June	Port Kennedy Tavern, (Western Australia) Port Kennedy	(72.38) Howard Jones	6 – 5	Bailey Marsh (73.00)	

=== South Australia ===
Notably in the South Australian events, Kym Mitchell became the first female winner of a DPA event in the 20-year history of the organisation.

No.	Date	Venue	Winner	Legs	Runner-up	Ref.
2	Saturday 12 February	Northern Districts Darts Association, (South Australia) Elizabeth North	(77.84) Danny Porter	6 – 5	Scott Hallett (77.18)	
3	Sunday 13 February	Northern Districts Darts Association, (South Australia) Elizabeth North	(79.66) Danny Porter	6 – 4	Adam Leek (74.66)	
4	Friday 11 March	Northern Districts Darts Association, (South Australia) Elizabeth North	(66.94) Danny Porter	6 – 3	Adam Leek (66.75)	
5	Saturday 12 March	Northern Districts Darts Association, (South Australia) Elizabeth North	(86.01) Rob Modra	6 – 4	Danny Porter (84.43)	
6	Sunday 13 March	Northern Districts Darts Association, (South Australia) Elizabeth North	(70.31) Kevin Young	6 – 5	Danny Porter (71.47)	
7	Friday 8 April	Northern Districts Darts Association, (South Australia) Elizabeth North	(85.28) Rob Modra	6 – 3	Danny Porter (83.13)	
8	Saturday 9 April	Northern Districts Darts Association, (South Australia) Elizabeth North	(69.77) Danny Porter	6 – 1	Jed Nethercott (64.41)	
9	Sunday 10 April	Northern Districts Darts Association, (South Australia) Elizabeth North	(87.40) Danny Porter	6 – 1	Rob Modra (76.23)	
10	Friday 13 May	Northern Districts Darts Association, (South Australia) Elizabeth North	(80.79) Danny Porter	6 – 1	Adam Leek (68.36)	
11	Saturday 14 May	Northern Districts Darts Association, (South Australia) Elizabeth North	(80.79) Danny Porter	6 – 3	Brett Selga (73.24)	
12	Sunday 15 May	Northern Districts Darts Association, (South Australia) Elizabeth North	(71.95) Danny Porter	6 – 3	Phillip Rowland (70.91)	
13	Friday 10 June	Northern Districts Darts Association, (South Australia) Elizabeth North	(81.12) Danny Porter	6 – 4	Rob Modra (76.55)	
14	Saturday 11 June	Northern Districts Darts Association, (South Australia) Elizabeth North	(81.43) Kym Mitchell	6 – 5	Danny Porter (79.90)	
15	Sunday 12 June	Northern Districts Darts Association, (South Australia) Elizabeth North	(84.75) Danny Porter	6 – 1	Kym Mitchell (70.98)	

=== Victoria ===
No.	Date	Venue	Winner	Legs	Runner-up	Ref.
2	Saturday 12 February	Australian Italian Club, (Victoria (state)) Morwell	(85.46) Mal Cuming	5 – 2	Brody Klinge (83.48)	
3	Sunday 13 February	Australian Italian Club, (Victoria (state)) Morwell	(84.30) Mal Cuming	6 – 3	Brody Klinge (77.59)	
4	Friday 11 March	Melton Dart Club, (Victoria (state)) Melton	(81.09) Brandon Weening	6 – 1	Barry Leddington (74.07)	
5	Saturday 12 March	Melton Dart Club, (Victoria (state)) Melton	(81.60) Brandon Weening	6 – 4	Justin Thompson (79.29)	
6	Sunday 13 March	Melton Dart Club, (Victoria (state)) Melton	(87.45) Mal Cuming	6 – 2	Justin Thompson (89.05)	
7	Friday 8 April	Australian Italian Club, (Victoria (state)) Morwell	(84.95) Brandon Weening	6 – 4	Mal Cuming (81.45)	
8	Saturday 9 April	Australian Italian Club, (Victoria (state)) Morwell	(87.20) Stuart Coburn	6 – 4	Brandon Weening (83.87)	
9	Sunday 10 April	Australian Italian Club, (Victoria (state)) Morwell	(86.81) Mal Cuming	6 – 3	Brandon Weening (89.18)	
10	Friday 13 May	Melton Dart Club, (Victoria (state)) Melton	(84.61) Brandon Weening	6 – 2	Mal Cuming (77.76)	
11	Saturday 14 May	Melton Dart Club, (Victoria (state)) Melton	(88.63) Brandon Weening	6 – 3	Mal Cuming (85.95)	
12	Sunday 15 May	Melton Dart Club, (Victoria (state)) Melton	(88.16) Mal Cuming	6 – 1	Stuart Coburn (79.51)	
13	Friday 10 June	Geelong Darts Club, (Victoria (state)) Corio	(82.88) Brandon Weening	6 – 3	Stuart Coburn (81.62)	
14	Saturday 11 June	Geelong Darts Club, (Victoria (state)) Corio	(82.67) Brandon Weening	6 – 4	Stuart Coburn (81.40)	
15	Sunday 12 June	Geelong Darts Club, (Victoria (state)) Corio	(87.66) Stuart Coburn	6 – 4	Brandon Weening (83.84)	

=== DPA ProTour Playoff ===
On 17 July, the DPA hosted the ProTour Playoff.The tournament was won by Raymond Smith, who qualified for the 2023 PDC World Darts Championship.

Quarter-finals (best of 11 legs)
Joe Comito 88.22	6
Tim Pusey 85.70	3
Dave Marland 78.80	6
Bailey Marsh 76.25	1
Mal Cuming 76.75	0
Howard Jones 81.24	6
Raymond Smith 100.24	6
Peter Willmott 90.24	1

Semi-finals (best of 3 sets)
Joe Comito 93.14	2
Dave Marland 89.96	1
Howard Jones 85.51	0
Raymond Smith 84.86	2

Final (best of 5 sets)
Joe Comito 88.36	0
Raymond Smith 88.04	3

=== DPA Oceanic Masters ===
On 23 October, the DPA hosted the Oceanic Masters.The tournament was won by Mal Cuming, who qualified for the 2023 PDC World Darts Championship.

Quarter-finals (best of 11 legs)
Gordon Mathers 87.24	6
Bailey Marsh 80.93	2
Mark Cleaver 80.67	6
Jamie Browne 74.90	2
Haupai Puha 90.18	6
Joshua Walters 78.40	2
Mal Cuming 90.75	6
David Platt 89.27	3

Semi-finals (best of 11 legs)
Gordon Mathers 85.64	6
Mark Cleaver 81.38	2
Haupai Puha 86.37	4
Mal Cuming 93.75	6

Final (best of 3 sets)
Gordon Mathers 90.39	1
Mal Cuming 94.20	2

== Dartplayers New Zealand (DPNZ) Pro Tour ==
The Dartplayers New Zealand Tour consisted of 8 events in 2022. They were held over 4 weekends.

No.	Date	Venue	Winner	Legs	Runner-up	Ref.
1	Saturday 11 June	Papakura Club, (New Zealand) Auckland	Ben Robb	7 – 5	Haupai Puha	
2	Sunday 12 June	Papakura Club, (New Zealand) Auckland	Warren Parry	7 – 5	Ben Robb	
3	Saturday 6 August	Black Horse Hotel, (New Zealand) Christchurch	Ben Robb	7 – 5	Mark Cleaver	
4	Sunday 7 August	Black Horse Hotel, (New Zealand) Christchurch	Ben Robb	7 – 2	Warren Parry	
5	Saturday 24 September	Birkenhead RSA, (New Zealand) Auckland	(85.36) Mark Cleaver	7 – 3	John Hurring (81.27)	
6	Sunday 25 September	Birkenhead RSA, (New Zealand) Auckland	(91.74) Ben Robb	7 – 5	Haupai Puha (87.30)	
7	Saturday 15 October	Dunedin Metro Club, (New Zealand) Dunedin	Haupai Puha	7 – 6	Kayden Milne	
8	Sunday 16 October	Dunedin Metro Club, (New Zealand) Dunedin	Ben Robb	7 – 1	Haupai Puha	

== EuroAsian Darts Corporation (EADC) Pro Tour ==
The EuroAsian Darts Corporation was due to host 6 events over 2 weekends, however the second weekend was cancelled due to the 2022 Russian invasion of Ukraine, and the EADC was suspended from hosting any darting events until further notice.

No.	Date	Venue	Winner	Legs	Runner-up	Ref.
1	Saturday 26 February	Maxima Zarya Hotel, (Russia) Moscow	Aleksei Kadochnikov	6 – 3	Anton Kolesov	
2	Saturday 26 February	Maxima Zarya Hotel, (Russia) Moscow	Dmitriy Sitkarev	6 – 5	Roman Obukhov	
3	Sunday 27 February	Maxima Zarya Hotel, (Russia) Moscow	Boris Koltsov	6 – 1	Andrey Pontus	
4	Saturday 23 April	Maxima Zarya Hotel, (Russia) Moscow	Cancelled (Note: Following the events of the 2022 Russian invasion of Ukraine, the PDC suspended all darts events in Russia.)			
5	Saturday 23 April	Maxima Zarya Hotel, (Russia) Moscow	Cancelled			
6	Sunday 24 April	Maxima Zarya Hotel, (Russia) Moscow	Cancelled			

== Championship Darts Corporation (CDC) Pro Tour ==
The Championship Darts Corporation returned as one combined tour in 2022, after having split US and Canadian events in 2021. It hosted 12 events held over 4 weekends. The top players from the United States and Canada on the Tour Points List qualified for the 2023 PDC World Darts Championship, and they were Danny Baggish and David Cameron.

Final CDC Tour Points List
Rank	Player	Points
1	Danny Baggish	116
2	David Cameron	96
3	Jacob Taylor	92
4	Leonard Gates	81
5	Alex Spellman	70
6	John Norman Jnr	68
7	Larry Butler	62
8	Matt Campbell	62
9	Jim Long	52
10	Gary Mawson	52

No.	Date	Venue	Winner	Legs	Runner-up	Ref.
1	Saturday 14 May	American Legion Post 331, (United States) Brownsburg	Matt Campbell (98.54)	7 – 4	Danny Baggish (96.84)	
2	Saturday 14 May	American Legion Post 331, (United States) Brownsburg	Leonard Gates (97.04)	7 – 5	Chuck Puleo (96.32)	
3	Sunday 15 May	American Legion Post 331, (United States) Brownsburg	Danny Baggish (88.24)	7 – 5	Leonard Gates (82.60)	
4	Saturday 25 June	Cambridge Newfoundland Club, (Canada) Cambridge	Jacob Taylor (88.77)	7 – 6	Danny Baggish (90.76)	
5	Saturday 25 June	Cambridge Newfoundland Club, (Canada) Cambridge	David Cameron (97.10)	7 – 3	Leonard Gates (96.80)	
6	Sunday 26 June	Cambridge Newfoundland Club, (Canada) Cambridge	David Cameron (93.79)	7 – 2	Matt Campbell (88.66)	
7	Saturday 13 August	American Legion Post 331, (United States) Brownsburg	Jacob Taylor (90.30)	7 – 2	Alex Spellman (93.18)	
8	Saturday 13 August	American Legion Post 331, (United States) Brownsburg	David Cameron (84.69)	7 – 3	Alex Spellman (85.33)	
9	Sunday 14 August	American Legion Post 331, (United States) Brownsburg	Larry Butler (91.20)	7 – 3	Danny Baggish (90.52)	
10	Saturday 10 September	Royal Canadian Legion Branch 551, (Canada) Waterdown	Danny Baggish (90.89)	7 – 3	Stowe Buntz (92.38)	
11	Saturday 10 September	Royal Canadian Legion Branch 551, (Canada) Waterdown	Jim Long (80.28)	7 – 3	Stowe Buntz (75.08)	
12	Sunday 11 September	Royal Canadian Legion Branch 551, (Canada) Waterdown	Jacob Taylor (90.13)	7 – 5	Gary Mawson (91.30)	

=== Continental Cup ===
The CDC Continental Cup was held on 22 October. It featured the top sixteen players from the 2022 CDC Tour Points List (with the exception of Danny Baggish and Matt Campbell, due to their commitments on the PDC Pro Tour). The winner of the Continental Cup will earn entry into the 2023 US Darts Masters.

First round (best of 9 legs)
1	David Cameron 79.33	5
16	Ross Snook 83.72	3
8	Gary Mawson 86.84	5
9	Steve Warnock 83.74	3
4	Alex Spellman 90.52	5
13	Keith Way 85.31	4
5	John Norman Jnr 89.94	2
12	Stowe Buntz 89.21	5
2	Jacob Taylor 80.76	2
15	Doug Boehm 92.60	5
7	Jim Long 97.59	5
10	Chuck Puleo 92.73	3
3	Leonard Gates 84.07	3
14	Ryan Vander Weit 93.57	5
6	Larry Butler 84.11	2
11	Joey Lynaugh 84.69	5

Quarter-finals (best of 11 legs)
1	David Cameron 88.92	6
8	Gary Mawson 87.26	3
4	Alex Spellman 88.96	6
12	Stowe Buntz 78.98	5
15	Doug Boehm 105.05	6
7	Jim Long 82.75	2
14	Ryan Vander Weit 84.65	4
11	Joey Lynaugh 86.23	6

Semi-finals (best of 13 legs)
1	David Cameron 95.43	5
4	Alex Spellman 97.53	7
15	Doug Boehm 88.34	7
11	Joey Lynaugh 86.26	4

Final (best of 15 legs)
4	Alex Spellman 86.66	8
15	Doug Boehm 82.06	7

== World Championship International Qualifiers ==
Amongst the World Championship qualifiers for the 2023 PDC World Darts Championship saw the guarantee of the first ever representative from Ukraine, following the suspension of the Eurasian Darts Corporation (EADC), due to the as-still ongoing Russian invasion of Ukraine.

Date	Tournament	Venue	Winner	Score	Runner-up	Ref.
Saturday 4 June	PDC North American Championship	(United States) New York City, Hulu Theater	Leonard Gates (87.71)	6 – 3	Danny Baggish (94.84)	
Saturday 16 July	DPA Satellite Tour Play-Off	(Australia) Barrack Heights, Warilla Bowls Club	Raymond Smith (88.04)	3 – 0	Joe Comito (88.36)	
Sunday 17 July	PDJ Championship	(Japan) Kobe, Sanbo Hall 2F	Nobuhiro Yamamoto (82.86)	5 – 4	Sho Katsumi (80.89)	
Sunday 24 July	Women's World Matchplay	(England) Blackpool, Winter Gardens	Fallon Sherrock (82.41)	6 – 3	Aileen de Graaf (76.30)	
Sunday 4 September	PDC China Premier League	(China)	Xiaochen Zong (84.21)	11 – 6	Xicheng Han (74.99) (Note: Zong won the qualifier, but declined the invitation for personal reasons. Han took his place.)	
Sunday 25 September	PDC Asian Championship	(Japan) Fukuoka, Fukuoka Convention Center	Lourence Ilagan (74.13)	6 – 4	Yuichiro Ogawa (70.62)	
Sunday 25 September	PDC Asian Championship	(Japan) Fukuoka, Fukuoka Convention Center	Christian Perez (84.77)	6 – 5	Yoshihisa Baba (78.02)	
Sunday 25 September	PDC Asian Championship	(Japan) Fukuoka, Fukuoka Convention Center	Toru Suzuki (78.57)	6 – 5	Yuki Yamada (82.14)	
Sunday 25 September	PDC Asian Championship	(Japan) Fukuoka, Fukuoka Convention Center	Paolo Nebrida (90.03)	6 – 1	Jun Matsuda (85.00)	
Sunday 9 October	Africa Qualifier	(South Africa) Cape Town, Goodwood Sports Club	Grant Sampson	8 – 3	Laezeltrich Wentzel	
Sunday 16 October	Ukrainian Qualifier	(Ukraine) Kyiv, Hotel Nyvky	Vladyslav Omelchenko (76.42)	3 – 0	Volodymyr Zalevskyi (69.19)	
Sunday 16 October	South/Central American Qualifier (Note: A two event series was held to determine the World Championship qualifier from the South & Central America/Caribbean region. As there was a tie in the Order of Merit after two events, a one-game play-off was held to determine the qualifier.)	(Costa Rica) San José, Hotel Radisson	Diogo Portela (79.37)	6 – 4	Jesús Sálate (76.09)	
Monday 17 October	DPNZ Qualifier	(New Zealand) Dunedin, Dunedin Metro Club	Ben Robb (96.07)	8 – 4	Haupai Puha (86.05)	
Sunday 23 October	DPA Oceanic Masters	(Australia) Barrack Heights, Warilla Bowls Club	Mal Cuming (94.20)	2 – 1	Gordon Mathers (90.39)	
Sunday 30 October	India Qualifier	(India) Surat, Surat Tennis Club	Prakash Jiwa (80.14)	6 – 4	Nitin Kumar (81.57)	
Friday 11 November	PDC Europe Super League	(Germany) Niedernhausen, H+ Hotel	Florian Hempel (94.56)	10 − 8	Niko Springer (92.57)	
Saturday 19 November	South-West Europe Qualifier	(Spain) Ávila, Hotel Cuatro Postes	José Justicia (96.44)	6 − 2	Thibault Tricole (88.73)	
Saturday 19 November	East Europe Qualifier	(Austria) Eisenstadt, Dartsportzentrum Burgenland	Sebastian Białecki (87.43)	7 − 4	Christian Gödl (85.85)	
Saturday 26 November	West Europe Qualifier	(Germany) Kalkar, Wunderland Kalkar	Jimmy Hendriks (94.23)	7 – 2	Max Hopp (87.13)	
Sunday 27 November	World Youth Championship	(England) Minehead, Butlin's Minehead	Josh Rock (104.13)	6 – 1	Nathan Girvan (89.12)	
Monday 28 November	PDC Tour Card Holder Qualifier	(England) Barnsley, Barnsley Metrodome	Richie Burnett (86.98)	7 – 3	David Evans (84.96)	
Monday 28 November	PDC Tour Card Holder Qualifier	(England) Barnsley, Barnsley Metrodome	Ryan Joyce (96.72)	7 – 3	Jamie Clark (90.47)	
Monday 28 November	PDC Tour Card Holder Qualifier	(England) Barnsley, Barnsley Metrodome	Jeff Smith (89.45)	7 – 1	Nick Fullwell (79.21)	
