= 2021 PDC World Cup of Darts =

Tournament information
- Dates: 9–12 September 2021
- Venue: Sparkassen-Arena
- Location: Jena
- Country: Germany
- Organisation(s): PDC
- Format: Legs
- Prize fund: £350,000
- Winner's share: £70,000
- High checkout: 170 Danny Lauby (second round)

Champion(s)
- Scotland (Peter Wright and John Henderson)

The 2021 PDC World Cup of Darts, known as the 2021 Cazoo World Cup of Darts for sponsorship reasons, was the eleventh edition of the PDC World Cup of Darts. It took place from 9–12 September 2021 at the Sparkassen-Arena in Jena, Germany.

Wales (consisting of players Gerwyn Price and Jonny Clayton) were the defending champions, after beating the English team (Michael Smith and Rob Cross) 3–0 in the 2020 final. However, they lost 2–1 to Scotland (Peter Wright and John Henderson) in the semi-finals.

Scotland went on to win their second title after beating Austria, represented by Mensur Suljović and Rowby-John Rodriguez, in the final 3–1.

== Format ==
The tournament remained at 32 teams this year, with the top 8 teams being seeded and the remaining 24 teams being unseeded in the first round. As with recent years, the tournament is a straight knockout.

First round: Best of nine legs doubles.
Second round, quarter and semi-finals: Two best of seven legs singles matches. If the scores are tied, a best of seven legs doubles match will settle the match.
Final: Three points needed to win the title. Two best of seven legs singles matches are played, followed by a best of seven doubles match. If necessary, one or two best of seven legs singles matches in reverse order are played to determine the champion.

== Prize money ==
Total prize money remained at £350,000.

The prize money per team was:

Position (no. of teams)		Prize money (Total: £350,000)
Winners	(1)	£70,000
Runners-Up	(1)	£40,000
Semi-finalists	(2)	£24,000
Quarter-finalists	(4)	£16,000
Last 16 (second round)	(8)	£8,000
Last 32 (first round)	(16)	£4,000

== Teams and seedings ==
The competing nations were confirmed on 6 September 2021. The Top eight nations based on combined Order of Merit rankings were seeded, and all players named to those teams were the top 2 of each nation on the PDC Order of Merit, with the exception of Scotland and the United States. Peter Wright revealed on September 4 that Gary Anderson would not be representing Scotland for personal reasons and that John Henderson would replace him, while Danny Baggish also had to withdraw from the United States team due to quarantine regulations, with Chuck Puleo replacing him. Players representing unseeded nations were chosen by qualification tournaments specifically for this event.

China and Singapore returned to the competition after having to miss out last year, due to travel problems relating to COVID-19. Croatia were set to return, having not participated in the competition since 2013, but on 7 September, Croatia withdrew following an illness to Boris Krčmar, with Greece (represented by John Michael and Veniamin Symeonidis) replacing them. New Zealand (who were to be represented by Warren Parry and Ben Robb) missed out for the first time owing to their country's COVID travel restrictions, and after a confusion by an incorrect communication sent by PDC Nordic & Baltic, it was revealed that the Latvian team of Madars Razma and Nauris Gleglu would be the first reserves, and not one of the 32 teams in the competition.

Paolo Nebrida was due to represent the Philippines, but had to withdraw as his COVID-19 vaccination was not on the approved list to get him into Germany, so he was replaced by Christian Perez. Russia's Dmitriy Gorbunov also had to withdraw to due quarantine regulations and was replaced by Evgenii Izotov.

The teams are as follows:

Seeded nations

Rank	Country	Entered players
1	England	James Wade and Dave Chisnall
2	Wales	Gerwyn Price and Jonny Clayton
3	Netherlands	Michael van Gerwen and Dirk van Duijvenbode
4	Belgium	Dimitri Van den Bergh and Kim Huybrechts
5	Northern Ireland	Daryl Gurney and Brendan Dolan
6	Scotland	Peter Wright and John Henderson
7	Australia	Simon Whitlock and Damon Heta
8	Germany	Gabriel Clemens and Max Hopp

Unseeded nations

Country	Entered players
Austria	Mensur Suljović and Rowby-John Rodriguez
Brazil	Diogo Portela and Artur Valle
Canada	Jeff Smith and Matt Campbell
China	Jianfeng Lu and Wenqing Liu
Czech Republic	Karel Sedláček and Adam Gawlas
Denmark	Andreas Toft Jørgensen and Niels Heinsøe
Finland	Marko Kantele and Veijo Viinikka
Gibraltar	Sean Negrette and Justin Hewitt
Greece	John Michael and Veniamin Symeonidis
Hong Kong	Kai Fan Leung and Man Lok Leung
Hungary	János Végső and Patrik Kovács
Ireland	William O'Connor and Steve Lennon
Italy	Danilo Vigato and Michele Turetta
Japan	Jun Matsuda and Yoshihisa Baba
Lithuania	Darius Labanauskas and Mindaugas Barauskas
Philippines	Lourence Ilagan and Christian Perez
Poland	Krzysztof Ratajski and Krzysztof Kciuk
Portugal	José de Sousa and José Marquês
Russia	Boris Koltsov and Evgenii Izotov
Singapore	Paul Lim and Harith Lim
South Africa	Devon Petersen and Carl Gabriel
Spain	Jesús Noguera and José Justicia
Sweden	Daniel Larsson and Johan Engström
United States	Danny Lauby Jr. and Chuck Puleo

== Results ==
=== Draw ===
First round (best of 9 legs); 9–10 September
1	England 80.95	5
32	Brazil 73.34	2
Spain 91.24	4
16	South Africa 82.32	5
8	Germany 85.31	5
24	Canada 84.15	3
Russia 79.63	1
8	Japan 82.51	5
4	Belgium 88.66	5
28	Greece 80.70	2
Austria 90.00	5
12	Philippines 78.77	1
5	Northern Ireland 86.63	5
20	Hong Kong 88.74	4
29	Ireland 86.42	4
4	Portugal 86.81	5
2	Wales 89.30	5
30	Finland 82.57	2
19	Hungary 71.26	3
14	Lithuania 75.02	5
7	Australia 92.78	5
22	Italy 68.22	0
27	United States 91.99	5
6	Sweden 86.35	1
3	Netherlands 92.35	5
26	Denmark 79.93	1
23	Gibraltar 71.48	4
10	Singapore 78.59	5
6	Scotland 93.94	5
18	China 62.12	0
31	Czech Republic 103.47	2
2	Poland 104.97	5

Second round (best of 3 matches); 11 September
1	England 90.53	4	4	2
South Africa 81.79	1	2	0
8	Germany 79.20	4	0	4	2
Japan 81.35	2	4	2	1
4	Belgium 93.22	1	2	0
Austria 93.40	4	4	2
5	Northern Ireland 95.71	4	4	2
Portugal 78.55	0	0	0
2	Wales 95.08	4	2	4	2
Lithuania 81.47	2	4	3	1
7	Australia 93.65	4	4	2
United States 88.57	3	2	0
3	Netherlands 86.54	4	4	2
Singapore 77.34	0	3	0
6	Scotland 88.84	4	4	2
Poland 87.92	3	2	0

Quarter-finals (best of 3 matches); 12 September
1	England 95.52	4	4	2
8	Germany 87.85	1	0	0
Austria 92.57	3	4	4	2
5	Northern Ireland 88.44	4	2	3	1
2	Wales 88.21	4	4	2
7	Australia 84.98	1	3	0
3	Netherlands 93.79	4	1	3	1
6	Scotland 92.90	1	4	4	2

Semi-finals (best of 3 matches); 12 September
1	England 98.32	1	1	0
Austria 105.90	4	4	2
2	Wales 99.64	2	4	3	1
6	Scotland 93.32	4	2	4	2

Final (best of 5 matches); 12 September
Austria 84.84	4	1	3	3	1
6	Scotland 91.87	1	4	4	4	3

=== Second round ===
Two best of seven legs singles matches. If the scores were tied, a best of seven legs doubles match settled the match.

England (1)	South Africa	Score
James Wade 90.26	Carl Gabriel 77.64	4–1
Dave Chisnall 90.81	Devon Petersen 85.94	4–2
Final result		2–0

Germany (8)	Japan	Score
Gabriel Clemens 84.03	Jun Matsuda 80.72	4–2
Max Hopp 71.91	Yoshihisa Baba 82.36	0–4
Clemens & Hopp 79.22	Matsuda & Baba 80.97	4–2
Final result		2–1

Belgium (4)	Austria	Score
Kim Huybrechts 108.38	Mensur Suljović 107.91	1–4
Dimitri Van den Bergh 78.06	Rowby-John Rodriguez 78.90	2–4
Final result		0–2

Northern Ireland (5)	Portugal	Score
Brendan Dolan 95.43	José Marquês 72.10	4–0
Daryl Gurney 96.97	José de Sousa 85.00	4–0
Final result		2–0

Wales (2)	Lithuania	Score
Gerwyn Price 91.25	Mindaugas Barauskas 71.36	4–2
Jonny Clayton 95.36	Darius Labanauskas 88.08	2–4
Price & Clayton 98.11	Barauskas & Labanauskas 84.48	4–3
Final result		2–1

Australia (7)	United States	Score
Simon Whitlock 96.47	Danny Lauby 91.97	4–3
Damon Heta 90.84	Chuck Puleo 85.18	4–2
Final result		2–0

Netherlands (3)	Singapore	Score
Michael van Gerwen 88.41	Paul Lim 75.55	4–0
Dirk van Duijvenbode 84.67	Harith Lim 79.14	4–3
Final result		2–0

Scotland (6)	Poland	Score
Peter Wright 92.01	Krzysztof Kciuk 90.37	4–3
John Henderson 85.68	Krzysztof Ratajski 85.47	4–2
Final result		2–0

=== Quarter-finals ===
Two best of seven legs singles matches. If the scores were tied, a best of seven legs doubles match settled the match.

England (1)	Germany (8)	Score
James Wade 101.31	Gabriel Clemens 93.75	4–1
Dave Chisnall 89.73	Max Hopp 81.95	4–0
Final result		2–0

Austria	Northern Ireland (5)	Score
Mensur Suljović 93.17	Brendan Dolan 90.37	3–4
Rowby-John Rodriguez 99.67	Daryl Gurney 87.97	4–2
Suljović & Rodriguez 84.88	Dolan & Gurney 86.92	4–3
Final result		2–1

Wales (2)	Australia (7)	Score
Gerwyn Price 85.99	Simon Whitlock 83.24	4–1
Jonny Clayton 90.43	Damon Heta 86.72	4–3
Final result		2–0

Netherlands (3)	Scotland (6)	Score
Michael van Gerwen 93.16	John Henderson 93.40	4–1
Dirk van Duijvenbode 94.16	Peter Wright 96.04	1–4
Van Gerwen & Van Duijvenbode 93.97	Henderson & Wright 89.27	3–4
Final result		1–2

=== Semi-finals ===
Two best of seven legs singles matches. If the scores were tied, a best of seven legs doubles match will settle the match.

England (1)	Austria	Score
James Wade 91.91	Mensur Suljović 109.66	1–4
Dave Chisnall 104.73	Rowby-John Rodriguez 102.13	1–4
Final result		0–2

Wales (2)	Scotland (6)	Score
Gerwyn Price 103.33	John Henderson 95.20	2–4
Jonny Clayton 90.93	Peter Wright 88.29	4–2
Price & Clayton 103.93	Henderson & Wright 96.03	3–4
Final result		1–2

=== Final ===
Three match wins were needed to win the title. Two best of seven legs singles matches followed by a best of seven doubles match. If necessary, one or two best of seven legs reverse singles matches were played to determine the champion.

Austria	Scotland (6)	Score
Mensur Suljović 89.84	John Henderson 87.93	4–1
Rowby-John Rodriguez 78.12	Peter Wright 98.09	1–4
Suljovic & Rodriguez 87.83	Henderson & Wright 82.68	3–4
Mensur Suljović 83.07	Peter Wright 98.77	3–4
Final result		1–3
