= 2024 US Darts Masters =

2024 bet365 US Darts Masters

Tournament information
- Dates: 31 May–1 June 2024
- Venue: The Theater at Madison Square Garden
- Location: New York City
- Country: United States
- Organisation(s): PDC
- Format: Legs
- Prize fund: £60,000
- Winner's share: £20,000
- High checkout: 170 Gerwyn Price

Champion(s)
- Rob Cross

The 2024 bet365 US Darts Masters was a professional darts tournament that was held at The Theater at Madison Square Garden in New York City, United States from 31 May–1 June 2024. It was the sixth staging of the tournament by the Professional Darts Corporation and the third event in the 2024 World Series of Darts. The tournament featured 16 players (eight PDC players and eight North American representatives).

Michael van Gerwen was the defending champion after defeating Jeff Smith 8–0 in the 2023 final. However, he was beaten by Rob Cross 6–4 in the quarter-finals.

Rob Cross won his first US Darts Masters and his fourth World Series title in all, beating Gerwyn Price 8–7 in the final.

== Prize money ==
The total prize fund was £60,000.

Position (no. of players)		Prize money (Total: £60,000)
Winner	(1)	£20,000
Runner-up	(1)	£10,000
Semi-finalists	(2)	£5,000
Quarter-finalists	(4)	£2,500
First round	(8)	£1,250

== Qualifiers ==
The PDC announced the eight players who would be their elite representatives at the event on 13 March.

The seedings were based on the 2024 World Series rankings after 2 events:

1. Michael van Gerwen (quarter-finals)
2. Luke Littler (semi-finals)
3. Gerwyn Price (runner-up)
4. Luke Humphries (semi-finals)
5. Michael Smith (first round)
6. Nathan Aspinall (quarter-finals)
7. Rob Cross (champion)
8. Peter Wright (quarter-finals)

The three North American PDC Tour Card holders (Matt Campbell, Jules van Dongen and Danny Lauby) were joined by the winner of the 2023 CDC Continental Cup (Stowe Buntz), the winner of the 2024 CDC Cross-Border Challenge (Alex Spellman), and three qualifiers from events held on 17–18 May.

Qualification	Player
PDC Tour Card Holders	Matt Campbell (first round)
PDC Tour Card Holders	Jules van Dongen (first round)
PDC Tour Card Holders	Danny Lauby (first round)
CDC Continental Cup Winner	Stowe Buntz (first round)
CDC Cross-Border Challenge Winner	Alex Spellman (first round)
CDC Qualifiers	David Cameron (first round)
CDC Qualifiers	Jeff Smith (quarter-finals)
CDC Qualifiers	Adam Sevada (first round)

== Draw ==
The draw was made on 30 May.

First round (best of 11 legs); 31 May
1	Michael van Gerwen 89.67	6
Danny Lauby 84.62	1
Rob Cross 95.10	6
Adam Sevada 89.41	1
4	Luke Humphries 95.94	6
David Cameron 84.13	0
Nathan Aspinall 95.00	6
Stowe Buntz 93.83	2
2	Luke Littler 103.66	6
Matt Campbell 84.52	0
Michael Smith 86.56	1
Jeff Smith 85.36	6
3	Gerwyn Price 97.13	6
Jules van Dongen 86.23	3
Peter Wright 87.75	6
Alex Spellman 88.76	5

Quarter-finals (best of 11 legs); 1 June
1	Michael van Gerwen 92.07	4
Rob Cross 95.23	6
4	Luke Humphries 100.01	6
Nathan Aspinall 98.09	5
2	Luke Littler 104.07	6
Jeff Smith 93.44	2
3	Gerwyn Price 104.52	6
Peter Wright 92.18	1

Semi-finals (best of 13 legs); 1 June
Rob Cross 96.69	7
4	Luke Humphries 90.51	5
2	Luke Littler 104.59	6
3	Gerwyn Price 100.05	7

Final (best of 15 legs); 1 June
Rob Cross 91.55	8
3	Gerwyn Price 96.36	7
