= 2023 US Darts Masters =

2023 bet365 US Darts Masters

Tournament information
- Dates: 2–3 June 2023
- Venue: The Theater at Madison Square Garden
- Location: New York City, United States
- Organisation(s): Professional Darts Corporation (PDC)
- Format: Legs
- Prize fund: £60,000
- Winner's share: £20,000
- High checkout: 170 Rob Cross

Champion(s)
- Michael van Gerwen

The 2023 bet365 US Darts Masters was the fifth staging of the tournament by the Professional Darts Corporation and the third entry in the 2023 World Series of Darts. The tournament featured 16 players (eight top-ranking players and eight regional qualifiers), and was held at The Theater at Madison Square Garden in New York City, United States on 2–3 June 2023.

Michael Smith was the defending champion, after he defeated Michael van Gerwen 8–4 in the 2022 final, but he was eliminated in round 1, losing 2–6 to debutant Jim Long.

Van Gerwen went on to win the tournament for a second time, beating Jeff Smith 8–0 in the final.

== Prize money ==
Position (no. of players)		Prize money (Total: £60,000)
Winner	(1)	£20,000
Runner-up	(1)	£10,000
Semi-finalists	(2)	£5,000
Quarter-finalists	(4)	£2,500
First round	(8)	£1,250

== Qualifiers ==
The PDC announced the eight players who would be their elite representatives at the event included World Champion Michael Smith, reigning World Series of Darts Finals winner Gerwyn Price and three-time World Champion Michael van Gerwen. They were joined by Peter Wright, Rob Cross, Luke Humphries, Dimitri Van den Bergh and Nathan Aspinall.

The seedings were based on the 2023 World Series rankings after 2 events:

1. Michael Smith (ENG)
2. Gerwyn Price (WAL)
3. Peter Wright (SCO)
4. Rob Cross (ENG)
5. Luke Humphries (ENG)
6. Dimitri Van den Bergh (BEL)
7. Michael van Gerwen (NED)
8. Nathan Aspinall (ENG)

The three North American Tour Card holders were joined by the winners of the CDC Continental Cup and the CDC Cross-Border Challenge, as well as three qualifiers from events held on 20 and 21 May 2023.

Qualification	Player
PDC Tour Card Holders	Jeff Smith
PDC Tour Card Holders	Matt Campbell
PDC Tour Card Holders	Jules van Dongen
CDC Continental Cup Winner	Alex Spellman
CDC Cross-Border Challenge Winner*	Jim Long
CDC Qualifiers	Jason Brandon
CDC Qualifiers	J.T. Davis
CDC Qualifiers	Jake Macmillan

=== CDC Continental Cup ===
This competition featured the top sixteen players from the 2022 CDC Tour Points List (with the exception of Danny Baggish and Matt Campbell, due to their commitments on the PDC Pro Tour). The tournament was entirely held on 22 October 2022.

First round (best of 9 legs)
1	David Cameron 79.33	5
16	Ross Snook 83.72	3
8	Gary Mawson 86.84	5
9	Steve Warnock 83.74	3
4	Alex Spellman 90.52	5
13	Keith Way 85.31	4
5	John Norman Jnr 89.94	2
12	Stowe Buntz 89.21	5
2	Jacob Taylor 80.76	2
15	Doug Boehm 92.60	5
7	Jim Long 97.59	5
10	Chuck Puleo 92.73	3
3	Leonard Gates 84.07	3
14	Ryan Vander Weit 93.57	5
6	Larry Butler 84.11	2
11	Joey Lynaugh 84.69	5

Quarter-finals (best of 11 legs)
1	David Cameron 88.92	6
8	Gary Mawson 87.26	3
4	Alex Spellman 88.96	6
12	Stowe Buntz 78.98	5
15	Doug Boehm 105.05	6
7	Jim Long 82.75	2
14	Ryan Vander Weit 84.65	4
11	Joey Lynaugh 86.23	6

Semi-finals (best of 13 legs)
1	David Cameron 95.43	5
4	Alex Spellman 97.53	7
15	Doug Boehm 88.34	7
11	Joey Lynaugh 86.26	4

Final (best of 15 legs)
4	Alex Spellman 86.66	8
15	Doug Boehm 82.06	7

=== Cross-Border Darts Challenge ===
The new tournament featured eight players from both Canada and the United States facing off against each other. The event took place at White Eagle Hall in Jersey City, New Jersey on 21–22 April 2023.

Since Jeff Smith, who was already qualified as a Tour Card holder, won the CDC Cross-Border Challenge, runner-up Jim Long was awarded the place instead.

First round (best of 7 legs); 21 Apr
Joey Lynaugh 84.35 (Note: Lynaugh replaced USA's top-seeded Danny Baggish in the tournament)	3
Keith Way 83.55	4
CAN4	Jim Long 81.18	4
Chuck Puleo 85.94	3
CAN2	Jacob Taylor 87.24	4
Gary Mawson 70.59	1
USA3	Alex Spellman 77.26	4
John Part 77.48	3
CAN1	David Cameron 77.38	3
Jules van Dongen 78.21	4
USA4	Larry Butler 80.77	2
Jeff Smith 82.01	4
USA2	Leonard Gates 82.35	1
Steve Warnock 86.24	4
CAN3	John Norman Jnr 81.23	4
Danny Lauby 80.63	1

Quarter-finals (best of 9 legs); 22 Apr
Keith Way 88.11	4
CAN4	Jim Long 88.58	5
CAN2	Jacob Taylor 84.86	5
USA3	Alex Spellman 83.26	3
Jules van Dongen 90.56	0
Jeff Smith 96.35	5
Steve Warnock 89.30	5
CAN3	John Norman Jnr 85.13	3

Semi-finals (best of 9 legs); 22 Apr
CAN4	Jim Long 90.62	5
CAN2	Jacob Taylor 87.14	2
Jeff Smith 86.38	5
Steve Warnock 81.71	0

Final (best of 11 legs); 22 Apr
CAN4	Jim Long 69.57	0
Jeff Smith 79.81	6

== Draw ==
First round (best of 11 legs); 2 June
1	Michael Smith 87.32	2
Jim Long 92.61	6
Michael van Gerwen 91.15	6
Jake Macmillan 75.84	2
4	Rob Cross 82.53	6
Jason Brandon 75.39	2
Dimitri Van den Bergh 95.17	6
J.T. Davis 82.08	2
2	Gerwyn Price 105.62	6
Jules van Dongen 83.59	2
Luke Humphries 85.47	6
Alex Spellman 82.30	2
3	Peter Wright 88.48	2
Jeff Smith 87.23	6
Nathan Aspinall 105.81	6
Matt Campbell 97.95	4

Quarter-finals (best of 11 legs); 3 June
Jim Long 91.84	2
Michael van Gerwen 96.71	6
4	Rob Cross 98.43	6
Dimitri Van den Bergh 99.48	2
2	Gerwyn Price 104.37	4
Luke Humphries 98.61	6
Jeff Smith 96.00	6
Nathan Aspinall 99.89	2

Semi-finals (best of 13 legs); 3 June
Michael van Gerwen 99.78	7
4	Rob Cross 102.13	6
Luke Humphries 95.12	6
Jeff Smith 92.23	7

Final (best of 15 legs); 3 June
Michael van Gerwen 91.09	8
Jeff Smith 86.41	0
