= 2020 PDC World Cup of Darts =

Tournament information
- Dates: 6–8 November 2020
- Venue: Salzburgarena
- Location: Salzburg
- Country: Austria
- Organisation(s): PDC
- Format: Legs
- Prize fund: £350,000
- Winner's share: £70,000
- High checkout: 160 Matt Campbell; Rowby-John Rodriguez

Champion(s)
- Wales (Gerwyn Price and Jonny Clayton)

The 2020 PDC World Cup of Darts, known as the 2020 BetVictor World Cup of Darts for sponsorship reasons, was the tenth edition of the PDC World Cup of Darts. It occurred behind closed doors from 6–8 November 2020 at the Salzburgarena in Salzburg, Austria. The event was originally due to be held between 18–21 June 2020 at the Barclaycard Arena in Hamburg, Germany, but was postponed and relocated due to the COVID-19 pandemic. It was also relocated away from a second planned venue of the Premstättner Halle in Graz.

Scotland were the defending champions, after defeating the Irish team of William O'Connor and Steve Lennon 3–1 in the 2019 final, Peter Wright and Gary Anderson did not defend the title for Scotland this year, as both withdrew from taking part due to the COVID-19 pandemic, and were replaced by John Henderson and Robert Thornton, making Scotland the first defending champions of this tournament to be unseeded at the following tournament. The new-look Scotland team were beaten 2–1 by Wales in the second round.

Wales, represented by Gerwyn Price and Jonny Clayton, won their first World Cup of Darts title by defeating the English team of Michael Smith and Rob Cross 3–0 in the final.

== Format ==
The tournament remained at 32 teams this year, with the top 8 teams being seeded and the remaining 24 teams being unseeded in the first round. As in recent years, the tournament is a straight knockout.

First round: Best of nine legs doubles.
Second round, quarter and semi-finals: Two best-of-seven-leg singles matches. If the scores are tied, a best-of-seven-leg doubles match will settle the match.
Final: Three points needed to win the title. Two best-of-seven legs singles matches are played, followed by a best-of-seven doubles match. If necessary, one or two best-of-seven legs singles matches in reverse order are played to determine the champion.

== Prize money ==
Total prize money remained at £350,000.

The prize money per team was:

Position (no. of teams)		Prize money (Total: £350,000)
Winners	(1)	£70,000
Runners-Up	(1)	£40,000
Semi-finalists	(2)	£24,000
Quarter-finalists	(4)	£16,000
Last 16 (second round)	(8)	£8,000
Last 32 (first round)	(16)	£4,000

== Teams and seedings ==
All the countries that participated in the 2019 event returned for the 2020 event, although notably owing to the changes of personnel in their teams, neither Scotland nor Australia will be seeded at this tournament for the very first time. On 18 October, the Philippines expressed concerns due to logistics issues caused by COVID-19 travel restrictions, and had threatened to withdraw, but they were cleared to participate in the end.

On 2 November, Singapore withdrew from the competition as Harith Lim couldn't fly to Austria, because of new regulations in Singapore (whereas his teammate Paul Lim was based in Hong Kong), so they were replaced by Portugal (represented by José de Sousa and José Marquês), while Kim Viljanen, Cristo Reyes and Xicheng Han of Finland, Spain and China respectively, were replaced by Veijo Viinikka, Jesús Noguera and Zizhao Zheng. On the eve of the tournament, the Chinese team of Zizhao Zheng and Di Zhuang were forced to withdraw after issues with their flights to Austria, with the standby team Latvia, represented by Madars Razma & Janis Mustafejevs, taking their spot.

The competing nations were confirmed following the conclusion of the 2020 World Grand Prix on 12 October; all players named on the seeded nations are the top 2 of each nation on the PDC Order of Merit, although team selection was subject to change. The Top 8 nations based on combined Order of Merit rankings on 12 October will be seeded.

The teams were officially announced on 15 October:

Seeded nations

Rank	Country	Entered players
1	England	Michael Smith and Rob Cross
2	Wales	Gerwyn Price and Jonny Clayton
3	Netherlands	Michael van Gerwen and Danny Noppert
4	Northern Ireland	Daryl Gurney and Brendan Dolan
5	Belgium	Dimitri Van den Bergh and Kim Huybrechts
6	Germany	Max Hopp and Gabriel Clemens
7	Ireland	William O'Connor and Steve Lennon
8	Austria	Mensur Suljović and Rowby-John Rodriguez

Unseeded nations

Country	Entered players
Australia	Simon Whitlock and Damon Heta
Brazil	Diogo Portela and Bruno Rangel
Canada	Jeff Smith and Matt Campbell
Czech Republic	Karel Sedláček and Adam Gawlas
Denmark	Niels Heinsøe and Per Laursen
Finland	Marko Kantele and Veijo Viinikka
Gibraltar	Craig Galliano and Justin Hewitt
Greece	John Michael and Veniamin Symeonidis
Hong Kong	Kai Fan Leung and Royden Lam
Hungary	Patrik Kovács and János Végső
Italy	Andrea Micheletti and Daniele Petri
Japan	Seigo Asada and Yuki Yamada
Latvia	Madars Razma and Janis Mustafejevs
Lithuania	Darius Labanauskas and Mindaugas Barauskas
New Zealand	Cody Harris and Haupai Puha
Philippines	Lourence Ilagan and Noel Malicdem
Poland	Krzysztof Ratajski and Krzysztof Kciuk
Portugal	José de Sousa and José Marquês
Russia	Boris Koltsov and Aleksei Kadochnikov
Scotland	John Henderson and Robert Thornton
South Africa	Devon Petersen and Carl Gabriel
Spain	Toni Alcinas and Jesús Noguera
Sweden	Daniel Larsson and Dennis Nilsson
United States	Chuck Puleo and Danny Lauby Jr.

== Results ==
=== Draw ===
First round (best of 9 legs); 6 November
1	England 90.32	5
Philippines 89.48	3
Lithuania 87.23	5
Gibraltar 77.17	3
8	Austria 82.91	5
United States 81.18	2
Portugal 85.40	5
Hungary 73.32	0
4	Northern Ireland 87.78	2
Canada 94.51	5
New Zealand 86.22	5
Denmark 72.85	2
5	Belgium 93.53	5
Czech Republic 90.37	4
Hong Kong 81.54	4
Latvia 78.35	5
2	Wales 93.94	5
Russia 73.60	0
Japan 75.08	3
Scotland 80.45	5
7	Ireland 93.12	2
Australia 92.52	5
Poland 90.54	5
South Africa 82.73	0
3	Netherlands 94.00	5
Brazil 76.42	1
Italy 78.83	4
Spain 86.13	5
6	Germany 96.35	5
Finland 81.77	0
Sweden 82.92	0
Greece 91.65	5

Second round (best of 3 matches); 7 November
1	England 91.92	4	4	2
Lithuania 78.72	0	2	0
8	Austria 83.92	4	4	2
Portugal 83.87	2	1	0
Canada 92.26	4	4	2
New Zealand 88.33	1	2	0
5	Belgium 85.35	4	4	2
Latvia 76.10	0	3	0
2	Wales 96.32	4	2	4	2
Scotland 85.72	2	4	0	1
Australia 97.91	4	4	2
Poland 82.61	3	1	0
3	Netherlands 96.96	4	4	2
Spain 85.89	0	3	0
6	Germany 92.73	4	4	2
Greece 85.72	1	0	0

Quarter-finals (best of 3 matches); 8 November
1	England 90.90	3	4	4	2
8	Austria 90.98	4	3	3	1
Canada 93.61	1	4	2	1
5	Belgium 97.16	4	1	4	2
2	Wales 98.90	4	3	4	2
Australia 98.59	3	4	2	1
3	Netherlands 84.78	3	4	3	1
6	Germany 86.46	4	1	4	2

Semi-finals (best of 3 matches); 8 November
1	England 95.55	4	4	2
5	Belgium 89.60	3	3	0
2	Wales 99.38	4	4	2
6	Germany 92.12	2	2	0

Final (best of 5 matches); 8 November
1	England 95.38	1	2	3	0
2	Wales 101.30	4	4	4	3

=== Second round ===
Two best-of-seven singles matches. If the scores were tied, a best-of-seven-leg doubles match settled the match.

England (1)	Lithuania	Score
Michael Smith 91.09	Darius Labanauskas 81.48	4–0
Rob Cross 92.74	Mindaugas Barauskas 75.95	4–2
Final result		2–0

Austria (8)	Portugal	Score
Mensur Suljović 86.48	José de Sousa 93.52	4–2
Rowby-John Rodriguez 81.36	José Marquês 74.22	4–1
Final result		2–0

Canada	New Zealand	Score
Jeff Smith 88.32	Haupai Puha 88.41	4–1
Matt Campbell 96.19	Cody Harris 88.24	4–2
Final result		2–0

Belgium (5)	Latvia	Score
Kim Huybrechts 87.13	Janis Mustafejevs 69.43	4–0
Dimitri Van den Bergh 83.56	Madars Razma 82.76	4–3
Final result		2–0

Wales (2)	Scotland	Score
Gerwyn Price 104.60	John Henderson 93.62	4–2
Jonny Clayton 82.47	Robert Thornton 74.13	2–4
Price & Clayton 101.90	Henderson & Thornton 89.42	4–0
Final result		2–1

Australia	Poland	Score
Simon Whitlock 95.82	Krzysztof Ratajski 94.78	4–3
Damon Heta 99.99	Krzysztof Kciuk 70.44	4–1
Final result		2–0

Netherlands (3)	Spain	Score
Michael van Gerwen 101.90	Toni Alcinas 86.00	4–0
Danny Noppert 92.01	Jesús Noguera 85.78	4–3
Final result		2–0

Germany (6)	Greece	Score
Gabriel Clemens 95.73	John Michael 85.00	4–1
Max Hopp 89.73	Veniamin Symeonidis 86.43	4–0
Final result		2–0

=== Quarter-finals ===
Two best-of-seven singles matches. If the scores were tied, a best-of-seven-leg doubles match settled the match.

England (1)	Austria (8)	Score
Michael Smith 101.54	Mensur Suljović 109.52	3–4
Rob Cross 88.89	Rowby-John Rodriguez 83.54	4–3
Cross and Smith 82.28	Suljović and Rowby-John Rodriguez 79.88	4–3
Final result		2–1

Canada	Belgium (5)	Score
Jeff Smith 97.57	Kim Huybrechts 108.32	1–4
Matt Campbell 97.56	Dimitri Van den Bergh 94.42	4–1
Smith & Campbell 85.71	Van den Bergh & Huybrechts 88.75	2–4
Final result		1–2

Wales (2)	Australia	Score
Gerwyn Price 98.04	Simon Whitlock 104.13	4–3
Jonny Clayton 99.87	Damon Heta 102.25	2–4
Price & Clayton 98.80	Whitlock & Heta 89.38	4–2
Final result		2–1

Netherlands (3)	Germany (6)	Score
Danny Noppert 84.91	Gabriel Clemens 88.58	3–4
Michael van Gerwen 87.00	Max Hopp 77.24	4–1
Van Gerwen & Noppert 82.42	Clemens & Hopp 93.57	3–4
Final result		1–2

=== Semi-finals ===
Two best-of-seven singles matches. If the scores were tied, a best-of-seven-leg doubles match would settle the match.

England (1)	Belgium (5)	Score
Michael Smith 96.57	Kim Huybrechts 88.60	4–3
Rob Cross 94.53	Dimitri Van den Bergh 90.59	4–3
Final result		2–0

Wales (2)	Germany (6)	Score
Gerwyn Price 94.36	Gabriel Clemens 90.51	4–2
Jonny Clayton 104.40	Max Hopp 93.72	4–2
Final result		2–0

=== Final ===
Three match wins were needed to win the title. Two best-of-seven singles matches followed by a best-of-seven doubles match. If necessary, one or two best-of-seven reverse singles matches were played to determine the champion.

England (1)	Wales (2)	Score
Michael Smith 96.89	Gerwyn Price 95.38	1–4
Rob Cross 94.41	Jonny Clayton 105.00	2–4
Smith & Cross 94.85	Price & Clayton 103.52	3–4
Final result		0–3
