= 2022 Belgian Darts Open =

2022 edition of Belgian Darts Open

Tournament information
- Dates: 23–25 September 2022
- Venue: Oktoberhallen
- Location: Wieze
- Country: Belgium
- Organisation(s): PDC
- Format: Legs
- Prize fund: £140,000
- Winner's share: £25,000
- Nine-dart finish: Dave Chisnall
- High checkout: 170 Dave Chisnall (second round)

Champion(s)
- Dave Chisnall

The 2022 Belgian Darts Open was the twelfth of thirteen PDC European Tour events on the 2022 PDC Pro Tour. The tournament took place at the Oktoberhallen, Wieze, Belgium, from 23–25 September 2022. It featured a field of 48 players and £140,000 in prize money, with £25,000 going to the winner.

Dave Chisnall won his third European tour title, beating Andrew Gilding 8–6 in the final. He also hit the first European Tour nine-darter for three years in his semi-final win over Danny Noppert.

== Prize money ==
The prize money was unchanged from the European Tours of the last 3 years:

Stage (num. of players)		Prize money
Winner	(1)	£25,000
Runner-up	(1)	£10,000
Semi-finalists	(2)	£6,500
Quarter-finalists	(4)	£5,000
Third round losers	(8)	£3,000
Second round losers	(16)	£2,000*
First round losers	(16)	£1,000*
Total	£140,000	

- Seeded players who lose in the second round and host nation qualifiers (who qualify automatically as a result of their ranking) who lose in their first match of the event shall not be credited with prize money on any Order of Merit. A player who qualifies as a qualifier, but later becomes a seed due to the withdrawal of one or more other players shall be credited with their prize money on all Orders of Merit regardless of how far they progress in the event.

== Qualification and format ==
The top 16 entrants from the PDC ProTour Order of Merit on 26 July automatically qualified for the event and were seeded in the second round.

The remaining 32 places went to players from six qualifying events – 24 from the Tour Card Holder Qualifier (held on 2 August), two from the Associate Member Qualifier (held on 27 August), the two highest ProTour ranking Belgian players, two from the Host Nation Qualifier (held on 22 September), one from the Nordic & Baltic Associate Member Qualifier (held on 29 July), and one from the East European Associate Member Qualifier (held on 26 June).

Luke Humphries, Gerwyn Price and Michael Smith withdrew as seeds prior to the draw, meaning Martin Schindler, Gabriel Clemens and Adrian Lewis were promoted into seeded positions and three extra places were made available in the Host Nation Qualifier.

The following players took part in the tournament:

Top 16

1. Michael van Gerwen (second round)
2. Rob Cross (third round)
3. Damon Heta (second round)
4. Nathan Aspinall (third round)
5. Ryan Searle (third round)
6. Peter Wright (second round)
7. Dirk van Duijvenbode (third round)
8. Joe Cullen (third round)
9. Danny Noppert (semi-finals)
10. Jonny Clayton (semi-finals)
11. Dimitri Van den Bergh (second round)
12. José de Sousa (quarter-finals)
13. Dave Chisnall (winner)
14. Martin Schindler (quarter-finals)
15. Gabriel Clemens (quarter-finals)
16. Adrian Lewis (quarter-finals)

Tour Card Qualifier
- Jeff Smith (first round)
- Danny Baggish (first round)
- Boris Krčmar (second round)
- Niels Zonneveld (third round)
- Ross Smith (second round)
- Rusty-Jake Rodriguez (third round)
- Vincent van der Voort (first round)
- Simon Whitlock (first round)
- Keane Barry (second round)
- Bradley Brooks (second round)
- Alan Soutar (first round)
- Andrew Gilding (runner-up)
- Mervyn King (second round)
- Steve Beaton (first round)
- Kevin Doets (first round)
- Steve West (first round)
- Ryan Meikle (second round)
- Chris Dobey (first round)
- Jamie Hughes (second round)
- Madars Razma (second round)
- Cameron Menzies (first round)

Associate Member Qualifier
- Gian van Veen (first round)
- Jelle Klaasen (second round)

Highest Ranked Belgians
- Kim Huybrechts (third round)
- Mike De Decker (second round)

Host Nation Qualifier
- Andy Baetens (first round)
- Wouter Vanrolleghem (first round)
- Roberto Vandaele (first round)
- Remo Mandiau (first round)
- François Schweyen (first round)

Nordic & Baltic Qualifier
- Dennis Nilsson (second round)

East European Qualifier
- Karel Sedláček (second round)

== Draw ==
First round (best of 11 legs); 23 September
Steve West 78.16	4
Kim Huybrechts 82.41	6
Boris Krčmar 86.78	6
Cameron Menzies 83.20	1
Dennis Nilsson 90.49	6
Kevin Doets 86.21	2
Andy Baetens 88.56	4
Madars Razma 82.88	6
Jamie Hughes 90.17	6
Vincent van der Voort 93.36	3
Jelle Klaasen 92.50	6
François Schweyen 90.91	4
Bradley Brooks 82.27	6
Chris Dobey 84.03	5
Steve Beaton 85.90	2
Ross Smith 100.82	6
Mike De Decker 83.46	6
Remo Mandiau 79.42	3
Gian van Veen 82.44	4
Ryan Meikle 81.68	6
Mervyn King 88.69	6
Wouter Vanrolleghem 75.72	3
Keane Barry 96.58	6
Danny Baggish 85.21	2
Rusty-Jake Rodriguez 89.07	6
Jeff Smith 91.10	3
Karel Sedláček 84.87	6
Roberto Vandaele 81.05	4
Niels Zonneveld 88.16	6
Alan Soutar 81.64	2
Andrew Gilding 99.81	6
Simon Whitlock 92.60	5

Second round (best of 11 legs); 24 September
1	Michael van Gerwen 88.93	4
Kim Huybrechts 84.83	6
16	Adrian Lewis 102.94	6
Boris Krčmar 96.91	1
8	Joe Cullen 97.04	6
Dennis Nilsson 91.09	2
9	Danny Noppert 92.13	6
Madars Razma 90.58	5
4	Nathan Aspinall 97.74	6
Jamie Hughes 92.59	1
13	Dave Chisnall 98.39	6
Jelle Klaasen 95.76	2
5	Ryan Searle 90.18	6
Bradley Brooks 79.67	1
12	José de Sousa 98.52	6
Ross Smith 103.31	5
2	Rob Cross 93.37	6
Mike De Decker 91.59	4
15	Gabriel Clemens 100.13	6
Ryan Meikle 91.94	1
7	Dirk van Duijvenbode 99.53	6
Mervyn King 95.71	5
10	Jonny Clayton 91.21	6
Keane Barry 88.09	5
3	Damon Heta 91.80	5
Rusty-Jake Rodriguez 88.91	6
14	Martin Schindler 95.75	6
Karel Sedláček 90.85	2
6	Peter Wright 97.61	5
Niels Zonneveld 94.86	6
11	Dimitri Van den Bergh 95.57	5
Andrew Gilding 96.00	6

Third round (best of 11 legs); 25 September
Huybrechts 88.09	1
16	Lewis 93.72	6
8	Cullen 102.20	4
9	Noppert 101.65	6
4	Aspinall 94.59	4
13	Chisnall 94.84	6
5	Searle 97.20	4
12	Sousa 106.18	6
2	Cross 86.38	3
15	Clemens 94.43	6
7	van Duijvenbode 105.74	4
10	Clayton 106.68	6
Rodriguez 86.18	3
14	Schindler 94.04	6
Zonneveld 94.74	3
Gilding 93.74	6

Quarter-finals (best of 11 legs); 25 September
16	Lewis 86.40	3
9	Noppert 95.53	6
13	Chisnall 89.72	6
12	Sousa 85.96	2
15	Clemens 96.46	5
10	Clayton 97.59	6
14	Schindler 84.73	2
Gilding 87.41	6

Semi-finals (best of 13 legs); 25 September
9	Noppert 99.60	4
13	Chisnall 103.89	7
10	Clayton 97.49	5
Gilding 97.87	7

Final (best of 15 legs); 25 September
13	Chisnall 92.31	8
Gilding 89.69	6
