= 2022 German Darts Grand Prix =

2022 edition of German Darts Grand Prix

2022 Interwetten German Darts Grand Prix

Tournament information
- Dates: 16–18 April 2022
- Venue: Kulturhalle Zenith
- Location: Munich, Germany
- Organisation(s): Professional Darts Corporation (PDC)
- Format: Legs
- Prize fund: £140,000
- Winner's share: £25,000
- High checkout: 170 Damon Heta

Champion(s)
- Luke Humphries

The 2022 German Darts Grand Prix (known for sponsorship reasons as the 2022 Interwetten German Darts Grand Prix) was the third of thirteen PDC European Tour events on the 2022 PDC Pro Tour. The tournament took place at Kulturhalle Zenith, Munich from 16 to 18 April 2022. It featured a field of 48 players and £140,000 in prize money, with £25,000 going to the winner.

Michael van Gerwen was the defending champion after defeating Simon Whitlock 8–3 in the 2019 final, but he was whitewashed 7–0 by Luke Humphries in the semi-finals.

Humphries went on to win his first European Tour event, defeating Martin Lukeman 8–2 in the final.

== Prize money ==
The prize money was unchanged from the European Tours of the last 3 years:

Stage (num. of players)		Prize money
Winner	(1)	£25,000
Runner-up	(1)	£10,000
Semi-finalists	(2)	£6,500
Quarter-finalists	(4)	£5,000
Third round losers	(8)	£3,000
Second round losers	(16)	£2,000*
First round losers	(16)	£1,000*
Total	£140,000	

- Seeded players who lose in the second round and host nation qualifiers (who qualify automatically as a result of their ranking) who lose in their first match of the event shall not be credited with prize money on any Order of Merit. A player who qualifies as a qualifier, but later becomes a seed due to the withdrawal of one or more other players shall be credited with their prize money on all Orders of Merit regardless of how far they progress in the event.

== Qualification and format ==
The top 16 entrants from the PDC Pro Tour Order of Merit on 1 February automatically qualified for the event and were seeded in the second round.

The remaining 32 places went to players from six qualifying events – 24 from the Tour Card Holder Qualifier (held on 11 February), two from the Associate Member Qualifier (held on 23 February), the two highest ProTour ranking German players, two from the Host Nation Qualifier (held on 24 February), one from the Nordic & Baltic Associate Member Qualifier (held on 29 January), and one from the East European Associate Member Qualifier (held on 5 March).

Krzysztof Ratajski withdrew after the qualifiers, so Gabriel Clemens was promoted into the seeded positions, and Karel Sedláček received a bye into the second round.

Gerwyn Price withdrew from his second round match due to illness, so Keane Barry received a bye to the third round.

The following players will take part in the tournament:

Top 16

1. Gerwyn Price (second round, withdrew)
2. José de Sousa (second round)
3. Michael Smith (third round)
4. Peter Wright (second round)
5. Jonny Clayton (quarter-finals)
6. Joe Cullen (second round)
7. Michael van Gerwen (semi-finals)
8. Brendan Dolan (second round)
9. Ryan Searle (third round)
10. Rob Cross (third round)
11. Dirk van Duijvenbode (third round)
12. Dimitri Van den Bergh (second round)
13. Damon Heta (semi-finals)
14. Luke Humphries (champion)
15. Callan Rydz (second round)
16. Gabriel Clemens (second round)

Tour Card Qualifier
- Keegan Brown (quarter-finals)
- Kim Huybrechts (first round)
- Boris Krčmar (second round)
- Madars Razma (third round)
- Chris Dobey (second round)
- Alan Soutar (first round)
- Berry van Peer (second round)
- Adam Hunt (first round)
- Jermaine Wattimena (first round)
- James Wilson (first round)
- Dave Chisnall (second round)
- Keane Barry (third round)
- Raymond van Barneveld (second round)
- Jim Williams (first round)
- Danny Baggish (second round)
- Luke Woodhouse (first round)
- Vincent van der Voort (first round)
- Scott Waites (third round)
- Ryan Meikle (first round)
- Adam Gawlas (first round)
- Martin Lukeman (runner-up)
- Jeffrey de Zwaan (second round)
- Max Hopp (third round)
- John O'Shea (first round)

Associate Member Qualifier
- Wesley Plaisier (quarter-finals)
- Thomas Junghans (first round)

Highest Ranked Germans
- Martin Schindler (quarter-finals)

Host Nation Qualifier
- Lukas Wenig (first round)
- Dragutin Horvat (first round)

Nordic & Baltic Qualifier
- Daniel Larsson (first round)

East European Qualifier
- Karel Sedláček (second round)

== Draw ==
The draw was confirmed on 14 April. Numbers to the left of a player's name show the seedings for the top 16 in the tournament. The figures to the right of a player's name state their three-dart average in a match. Players in bold denote match winners.

**First round** (best of 11 legs); 16 April
**Keane Barry** 83.11	**6**
Lukas Wenig 85.81	4
**Martin Lukeman** 88.30	**6**
Adam Gawlas 85.42	3
**Martin Schindler** 93.55	**6**
Jermaine Wattimena 90.23	3
**Danny Baggish** 78.64	**6**
Thomas Junghans 76.81	2
Dragutin Horvat 90.20	1
**Scott Waites** 89.65	**6**
**Raymond van Barneveld** 94.93	**6**
James Wilson 77.19	0
Ryan Meikle 98.44	4
**Dave Chisnall** 98.18	**6**
Alan Soutar 83.19	4
**Max Hopp** 85.06	**6**
Kim Huybrechts 91.00	4
**Madars Razma** 92.17	**6**
**Keegan Brown** 95.24	**6**
Adam Hunt 85.79	2
John O'Shea 81.04	2
**Chris Dobey** 84.62	**6**
**Karel Sedláček**	**bye**
Daniel Larsson 96.15	4
**Berry van Peer** 95.69	**6**
**Jeffrey de Zwaan** 95.12	**6**
Vincent van der Voort 94.68	5
**Wesley Plaisier** 104.05	**6**
Jim Williams 91.55	3
**Boris Krčmar** 85.51	**6**
Luke Woodhouse 81.85	3

**Second round** (best of 11 legs); 17 April
1	Gerwyn Price	w/d
**Keane Barry**	**w/o**
16	Gabriel Clemens 77.52	3
**Martin Lukeman** 92.54	**6**
8	Brendan Dolan 92.49	5
**Martin Schindler** 91.79	**6**
**9**	**Ryan Searle** 100.20	**6**
Danny Baggish 91.70	2
4	Peter Wright 91.67	5
**Scott Waites** 93.30	**6**
**13**	**Damon Heta** 99.73	**6**
Raymond van Barneveld 90.31	4
**5**	**Jonny Clayton** 102.32	**6**
Dave Chisnall 94.93	2
12	Dimitri Van den Bergh 86.53	3
**Max Hopp** 92.66	**6**
2	José de Sousa 86.83	4
**Madars Razma** 85.96	**6**
15	Callan Rydz 87.37	3
**Keegan Brown** 86.14	**6**
**7**	**Michael van Gerwen** 105.55	**6**
Chris Dobey 98.88	5
**10**	**Rob Cross** 92.50	**6**
Karel Sedláček 85.60	3
**3**	**Michael Smith** 100.90	**6**
Berry van Peer 89.00	4
**14**	**Luke Humphries** 90.68	**6**
Jeffrey de Zwaan 92.94	4
6	Joe Cullen 89.32	4
**Wesley Plaisier** 93.16	**6**
**11**	**Dirk van Duijvenbode** 93.64	**6**
Boris Krčmar 89.46	5

**Third round** (best of 11 legs); 18 April
Barry 82.06	5
**Lukeman** 87.57	**6**
**Schindler** 109.24	**6**
9	Searle 97.09	1
Waites 92.82	3
**13**	**Heta** 100.73	**6**
**5**	**Clayton** 96.99	**6**
Hopp 88.91	1
Razma 77.86	4
**Brown** 86.77	**6**
**7**	**van Gerwen** 103.68	**6**
10	Cross 101.87	3
3	Smith 101.90	3
**14**	**Humphries** 101.46	**6**
**Plaisier** 95.44	**6**
11	van Duijvenbode 101.12	5

**Quarter-finals** (best of 11 legs); 18 April
**Lukeman** 98.35	**6**
Schindler 96.22	4
**13**	**Heta** 97.63	**6**
5	Clayton 91.07	5
Brown 91.53	2
**7**	**van Gerwen** 102.58	**6**
**14**	**Humphries** 102.46	**6**
Plaisier 99.20	5

**Semi-finals** (best of 13 legs); 18 April
**Lukeman** 92.19	**7**
13	Heta 94.85	5
7	van Gerwen 90.40	0
**14**	**Humphries** 107.36	**7**

**Final** (best of 15 legs); 18 April
Lukeman 83.87	2
**14**	**Humphries** 92.07	**8**
