= Sparkassen-Arena, Jena =

Indoor arena in Jena, Germany

Coordinates: 50.8999°N 11.5886°E

Sparkassen Arena
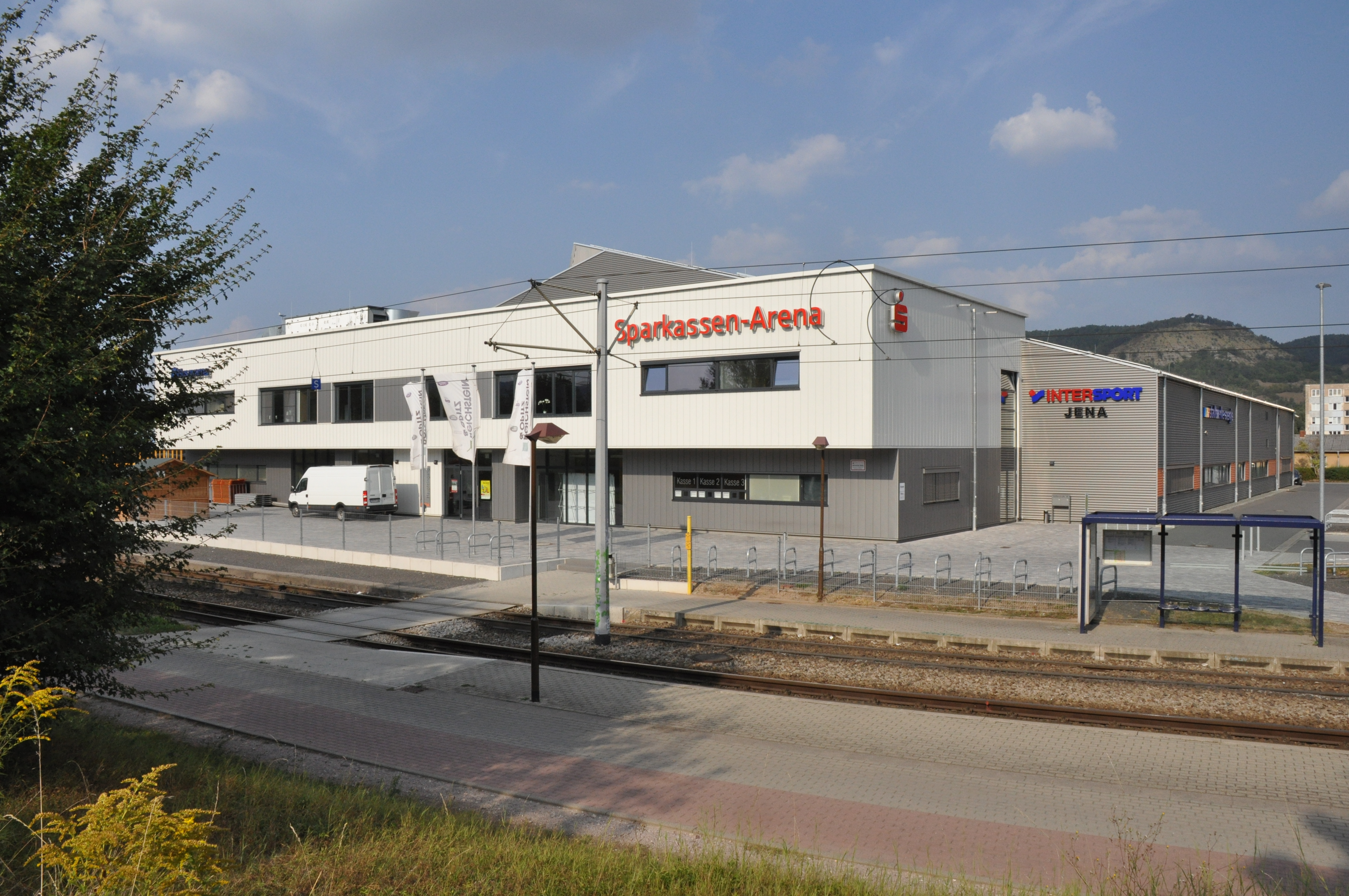
- Interactive map of Sparkassen Arena
- Location: Jena, Thuringia; Germany
- Owner: Arena Betriebsgesellschaft mbH
- Capacity: 3,000 (Basketball)

Construction
- Groundbreaking: 2012
- Opened: 2014
- Cost: €7 million
- Architect: Jana Margull
- General contractors: Bilfinger & Berger

Tenant
- Science City Jena (BBL) (2012-present)

Sparkassen Arena is an indoor arena in Jena, Germany. It serves as the home arena for Science City Jena of the Basketball Bundesliga. It has a seating capacity of 3,000. The naming sponsor was a local savings bank, Sparkasse Jena-Saale-Holzland.

In 2021, it hosted the PDC World Cup of Darts, which was won by Scotland.
