= Jim Long (darts player) =

Canadian darts player (born 1968)

Personal information
- Nickname: "The Gentleman"
- Born: 28 May 1968 (age 58) London, Ontario, Canada

Sport
- Sport: Darts
- Playing since: 1999
- Darts: 22g Galaxy Signature
- Laterality: Right-handed
- Walk-on music: "Sweat (A La La La La Long)" by Inner Circle

Organisation (see split in darts)
- PDC: 2009–present (Tour Card: 2025–present)
- Current world ranking: (PDC) 84 ▼1 (5 November 2026)

WDF major events – best performances
- World Masters: Last 64: 2022

PDC premier events – best performances
- World Championship: Last 64: 2019
- UK Open: Last 64: 2026
- World Series Finals: Last 16: 2026

WSDT major events – best performances
- World Championship: Semi-final: 2024

Other tournament wins
- Years
| Canadian Open | 2023 |
| K-W Tri City Open | 2023 |
CDC Pro Tour (×6)
| 2019, 2020, 2022, 2024 (×2), 2025 |

Jim Long (born 28 May 1968) is a Canadian darts player who competes in Professional Darts Corporation (PDC) events. Nicknamed "the Gentleman", Long is a Canadian Open champion and a winner of 6 titles on the CDC Pro Tour.

== Career ==
Long started playing darts when he was 19.

In 2018, Long qualified for the 2019 PDC World Darts Championship as the highest ranked Canadian player on the CDC Championship Circuit. He won the first round match against Mickey Mansell before being defeated by Benito van de Pas in an extended game.

At the 2019 US Darts Masters, he made his debut on the World Series of Darts. In June, he played alongside captain Dawson Murschell for Canada in the 2019 PDC World Cup of Darts. They reached the quarter-finals.

In 2023, Long made his second appearance at the US Darts Masters. In the first-round match, he achieved a surprise win over Michael Smith before losing to Michael van Gerwen in the quarter-finals.

In 2024, he again qualified for the 2025 PDC World Darts Championship as the highest ranked Canadian player on the CDC Order of Merit. He lost 3–0 to James Hurrell in the first round.

Long won a PDC Tour Card for the first time at 2025 Q-School, winning it outright on the final day. He reached the final of the 2025 North American Championship but was defeated 6–3 by fellow Canadian Matt Campbell.

=== WSDT ===
Long also played events on the World Seniors Darts Tour. He qualified for the 2024 World Seniors Darts Championship and reached the semi-finals after wins over compatriot David Cameron, Martin Adams and Paul Hogan. Eventually, he was defeated by John Henderson.

== Personal life ==
From 1990 until his retirement in 2020, Long worked at a General Motors plant in Ingersoll. He is married to Rhonda and the couple have three children.

== World Championship results ==
=== PDC World Championship ===
- 2019: Second round (lost to Benito van de Pas 2–3)
- 2025: First round (lost to James Hurrell 0–3)

=== World Seniors Championship ===
- 2024: Semi-finals (lost to John Henderson 0–3)

== Performance timeline ==
=== PDC ===
| Tournament | 2019 | 2023 | 2025 | 2026 |
|---|---|---|---|---|
PDC Ranked televised events
| World Championship | 2R | DNQ | 1R | DNQ |
| World Masters | DNP | | | Prel. |
| UK Open | DNQ | | 2R | 4R |
PDC Non-ranked televised events
| World Cup | QF | DNQ | RR | RR |
| World Series Finals | Did not qualify | | | 2R |
PDC Other televised events
| North American Championship | QF | QF | F | F |

=== PDC European Tour ===
| Tournament | 2025 | 2026 |
|---|---|---|
| Belgian Darts Open | 1R | DNQ |
| Slovak Darts Open | NH | 2R |
| Flanders Darts Trophy | DNQ | 2R |

==== Players Championships ====
| Season | 1 | 2 | 3 | 4 | 5 | 6 | 7 | 8 | 9 | 10 | 11 | 12 | 13 | 14 | 15 | 16 | 17 | 18 | 19 | 20 | 21 | 22 | 23 | 24 | 25 | 26 | 27 | 28 | 29 | 30 | 31 | 32 | 33 | 34 |
|---|---|---|---|---|---|---|---|---|---|---|---|---|---|---|---|---|---|---|---|---|---|---|---|---|---|---|---|---|---|---|---|---|---|---|
| 2025 | WIG; 1R | WIG; 1R | ROS; 2R | ROS; 2R | LEI; 1R | LEI; 2R | HIL; 1R | HIL; 1R | LEI; 2R | LEI; 1R | LEI; 1R | LEI; 2R | ROS; 2R | ROS; 1R | HIL; 2R | HIL; 4R | LEI; 2R | LEI; 1R | LEI; 1R | LEI; 1R | LEI; 1R | HIL; 1R | HIL; 1R | MIL; 1R | MIL; 1R | HIL; 1R | HIL; 1R | LEI; 1R | LEI; 1R | LEI; 2R | WIG; 2R | WIG; 3R | WIG; 2R | WIG; 1R |
| 2026 | HIL; 2R | HIL; 1R | WIG; QF | WIG; 1R | LEI; 2R | LEI; 2R | LEI; 2R | LEI; 3R | WIG; 3R | WIG; 1R | MIL; 1R | MIL; 1R | HIL; 2R | HIL; 2R | LEI; 2R | LEI; 2R | LEI; 2R | LEI; 1R | MIL; 2R | MIL; 1R | WIG; 1R | WIG; 2R | LEI; 3R | LEI; 1R | HIL; 4R | HIL; 1R | LEI; 1R | LEI; 1R | ROS; 2R | ROS; 1R | ROS; 2R | ROS; 1R | LEI; 1R | LEI; 1R |
