= Alex Spellman =

American darts player (born 1988)

Personal information
- Nickname: "The Jackal"
- Born: November 6, 1988 (age 37) Boone, North Carolina, U.S.
- Home town: Fuquay-Varina, North Carolina, U.S.

Sport
- Sport: Darts
- Darts: 22g Winmau Signature
- Laterality: Right-handed
- Walk-on music: "Superstition" by Stevie Wonder

Organisation (see split in darts)
- PDC: 2023–
- WDF: 2022–
- Current world ranking: (WDF) 20 ▼11 (17 August 2026)

PDC premier events – best performances
- World Championship: Last 96: 2024
- Grand Slam: Group Stage: 2025

Other tournament wins
- Years
CDC Continental Cup	2022, 2025

Alex Spellman (born November 6, 1988) is an American professional darts player who competes in Professional Darts Corporation (PDC) events. He is a two-time CDC Continental Cup champion.

== Career ==
In June 2023, Spellman took part in the 2023 US Darts Masters, where he was one of the eight North American qualifiers, qualifying by winning the 2022 CDC Continental Cup. He lost to Luke Humphries 6–2 in the first round. At the same time, he played in the 2023 North American Championship, where he defeated JT Davis 6–3 in quarterfinals, before losing to Matt Campbell 6–2 in semi-finals.

In 2024, Spellman qualified for the 2024 PDC World Darts Championship via CDC Pro Tour rankings, where he was beaten 3–1 by Ryan Joyce.

Also apart from steeltip darts, Spellman plays in darts tournaments of the World Soft Darts Association (WSDA) as well.

== World Championship results ==
=== PDC ===
- 2024: First round (lost to Ryan Joyce 1–3)
- 2026: First round (lost to Gabriel Clemens 0–3)

== Performance timeline ==
=== PDC ===
Tournament	2024	2025	2026
PDC Ranked televised events
World Championship	1R	DNQ	1R
Grand Slam	DNQ	RR	

==== Players Championships ====
Season	1	2	3	4	5	6	7	8	9	10	11	12	13	14	15	16	17	18	19	20	21	22	23	24	25	26	27	28	29	30
2023	DNP						HIL; 1R	HIL; 1R	Did not participate																					

==== CDC Tour ====
Season	1	2	3	4	5	6	7	8	9	10	11	12	13	14	15	16
2021	L32	QF	QF	L64	QF	L32										
2022	QF	L32	L32	L32	QF	L16	F	F	SF	QF	QF	L16				
2023	QF	W	L16	L16	W	L16	F	F	L16	W	SF	SF				
2024	QF	L64	L16	QF	L16	QF	L16	F	SF	QF	W	QF	QF	SF		
2025	QF	L64	SF	L16	QF	QF	L32	L16	L16	QF	W	F	SF	QF	L32	SF
