= Danny Lauby Jr. =

American darts player (born 1992)

Danny Lauby
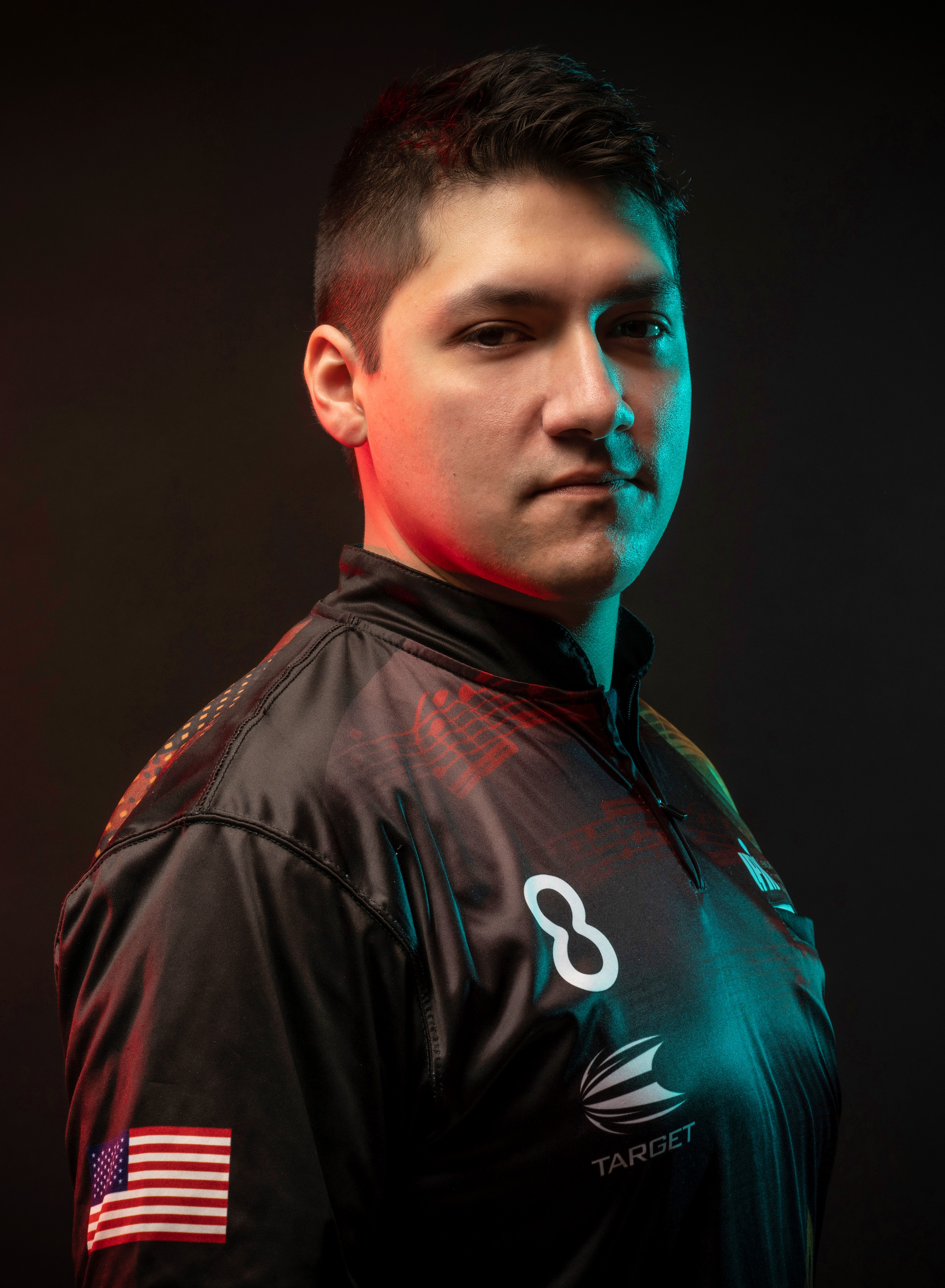
- Lauby in 2021

Personal information
- Full name: Daniel Lauby Junior
- Born: December 11, 1992 (age 33) Terre Haute, Indiana, U.S.

Sport
- Sport: Darts
- Playing since: 2001
- Darts: 22g Target
- Laterality: Left-handed
- Walk-on music: "Rock and Roll" by Led Zeppelin

Organisation (see split in darts)
- PDC: 2010–present (Tour Card: 2024–2025)
- WDF: 2022–2023

WDF major events – best performances
- World Championship: Quarter-final: 2023
- World Masters: Semi-final: 2022

PDC premier events – best performances
- World Championship: Last 96: 2021, 2022
- UK Open: Last 32: 2025
- World Series Finals: Last 32: 2025

Other tournament wins
- Years
ADO Youth Ch'ship	2008
ADO Buckeye Open	2016
ADO Music City Classic	2018
Cherry Bomb International	2022
Cleveland Extravaganza	2022
Indiana State Ch'ship	2018, 2019, 2020
Oregon Open	2022
Seacoast Open	2022
Witch City Open	2022
CDC Continental Cup	2019
CDC Pro Tour	2017
CDC Pro Tour
CDC Pro Tour (Waterdown)	2019
CDC Pro Tour (Tampa)	2021 (2x)
CDC Pro Tour (Wheeling)	2023

Daniel Lauby Jr. (born December 11, 1992) is an American professional darts player who competes in Professional Darts Corporation (PDC) events. He won the 2019 CDC Continental Cup. Lauby formerly played in World Darts Federation (WDF) events, where reached the semi finals of the 2022 World Masters and the quarter-finals at the 2023 WDF World Darts Championship. He is the son of fellow darts player Dan Lauby.

== Career ==
=== 2018 ===
Lauby made his World Series of Darts debut at the 2018 US Darts Masters, where he lost to James Wade 6–5 in a deciding leg.

=== 2019 ===
Lauby went to PDC Pro Tour Qualifying School, entering the 2019 UK Q–School, attempting to earn a PDC Tour Card, but lost in the final on the second day of qualification, thereby failing to win a card.

In October, Lauby beat Gary Mawson in the finals to win the CDC North American Continental Cup. This win ultimately lead to Lauby qualifying for the 2021 PDC World Darts Championship.

At the end of 2019, Lauby held 5th place on the CDC North American Two-Year Order of Merit and 6th place for the 2019 CDC North American Order of Merit.

=== 2020 ===
Lauby made his debut at the 2020 PDC World Cup of Darts alongside Chuck Puleo after Darin Young had to withdraw. They lost to Austria in the first round.

=== 2021 ===
In the CDC USA Tour 2021, Lauby won two events and reached a final in six events. Lauby won the first two events by beating Leonard Gates and Gary Mawson, 6–2 and 6–1 respectively, but lost the final of the third event to Leonard Gates, 5–6. He topped the year-end rankings and secured a place in the World Championship for a second year running and a place at the CDC Continental Cup on November 20.

=== 2022 ===
In January 2022 Lauby played again at Q-School. He qualified for the Final Stage as first in the First Stage ranking but still failed to reach his goal of a Tour Card. But two weeks later he qualified via the Riley's Amateur Qualifier in Chorlton-cum-Hardy for the UK Open 2022, where he lost after wins over Niko Springer and Paul Hogan in the third round to Andy Boulton.

=== 2023 ===
Lauby qualified for the WDF World Championship and reached the quarterfinals after wins over Jarno Bottenberg and Leonard Gates. He was defeated by Jelle Klaasen in the following round.

=== 2024 ===
After attending PDC Qualifying School, in an effort to earn his PDC Tour Card in consecutive years since 2018, Lauby finally won a card in 2024 by finishing 6th on the UK Q-School Order of Merit. He qualified for his first PDC European Tour event with the 2024 Austrian Darts Open. He won his first game against Ryan Joyce before losing 6–5 to Peter Wright in the second round.

=== 2025 ===
He reached the fifth round at the 2025 UK Open after defeating Brendan Dolan in a deciding leg in the fourth round. He then lost to Ryan Joyce. At the US Darts Masters, Lauby won a match at the tournament for the first time in four attempts, whitewashing defending champion Rob Cross 6–0 in the opening round.

== World Championship results ==
=== PDC World Championship ===
- 2021: First round (lost to Ryan Searle 2–3)
- 2022: First round (lost to William O'Connor 2–3)

=== WDF World Championship ===
- 2023: Quarter-finals (lost to Jelle Klaasen 1–4)

== Performance timeline ==
=== WDF ===
Tournament	2022	2023
WDF Ranked televised events
World Championship	DNQ	QF
World Masters	SF	NH
Career statistics
Season-end ranking (WDF)	10	9

=== PDC ===
Tournament	2020	2021	2022	2023	2024	2025
PDC Ranked televised events
World Championship	DNQ	1R	1R	Did not qualify		
World Masters	Did not qualify					Prel.
UK Open	DNQ		3R	1R	4R	5R
PDC Non-ranked televised events
World Cup	1R	2R	DNQ		RR	RR
Career statistics
Season-end ranking (PDC)	125	126	211	147	117	

==== European Tour ====
Tournament	2024
Austrian Open	2R

==== Players Championships ====
Season	1	2	3	4	5	6	7	8	9	10	11	12	13	14	15	16	17	18	19	20	21	22	23	24	25	26	27	28	29	30	31	32	33	34
2023 (Note: Not a Tour card holder)	Did not participate												HIL; QF	HIL; 1R	LEI; DNP	LEI; 3R	Did not participate													BAR; 3R				
2024	WIG; 1R	WIG; 3R	LEI; 1R	LEI; 1R	HIL; 1R	HIL; 3R	LEI; 2R	LEI; 2R	HIL; 1R	HIL; 1R	HIL; 2R	HIL; 1R	MIL; 1R	MIL; 1R	MIL; 2R	MIL; 1R	MIL; 1R	MIL; 4R	MIL; 1R	WIG; 1R	WIG; 1R	MIL; 1R	MIL; 1R	WIG; 1R	WIG; 1R	WIG; 1R	WIG; 2R	WIG; 3R	LEI; 1R	LEI; 1R				
2025	WIG; 1R	WIG; 2R	ROS; 1R	ROS; 1R	LEI; 1R	LEI; 1R	HIL; 2R	HIL; 2R	LEI; 1R	LEI; 1R	LEI; 1R	LEI; 1R	ROS; 1R	ROS; 1R	HIL; 1R	HIL; 2R	LEI; 2R	LEI; 1R	LEI; 2R	LEI; 1R	LEI; 1R	HIL; 1R	HIL; 1R	MIL; 1R	MIL; 1R	HIL; 1R	HIL; 1R	LEI; 2R	LEI; 1R	LEI; 2R	WIG; 1R	WIG; 1R	WIG; 2R	WIG; 1R

Performance Table Legend
W	Won the tournament	F	Finalist	SF	Semifinalist	QF	Quarterfinalist	#R; RR; L#	Lost in # round Round-robin; Last # stage	DQ	Disqualified
DNQ	Did not qualify	DNP	Did not participate	WD	Withdrew	NH	Tournament not held	#R; RR; L#	Lost in # round Round-robin; Last # stage	NYF	Not yet founded
