= John Norman Jnr =

Canadian darts player

Personal information
- Born: 15 June 1974 (age 52) Shea Heights, St. John's, Canada
- Home town: St. John's, Newfoundland, Canada

Sport
- Sport: Darts
- Playing since: 1994
- Darts: 24 Gram
- Laterality: Right-handed
- Walk-on music: "Any Way You Want It" by Journey

Organisation (see split in darts)
- BDO: 2006–2007, 2015–2016
- PDC: 2017–2024

WDF major events – best performances
- World Masters: Last 32: 2015

PDC premier events – best performances
- World Championship: Last 96: 2022

Other tournament wins
- Tournament: Years
- WDF Americas Cup Singles Molsons NL Fall Classic Ontario Open CDC Canada Pro Tour: 2016 2016 2015; 2021 (x2)

John Norman Jnr (born 15 June 1974) is a Canadian former professional darts player who has played in the Professional Darts Corporation (PDC) events.

He earned a PDC Tour Card in 2017, as one of the top 12 ranked players on the Q-School Order of Merit. He represented Canada in the 2017 PDC World Cup of Darts along with John Part, where they reached the second round before losing to the Austrian pairing of Mensur Suljović and Rowby-John Rodriguez.

== World Championship results ==
=== PDC ===
- 2022: First round (lost to Chas Barstow 1–3) (sets)
