= Stowe Buntz =

American darts player (born 1979)

Personal information
- Nickname: "Neon Nightmare"
- Born: 25 January 1979 (age 47) Portsmouth, Virginia, U.S.

Sport
- Sport: Darts
- Playing since: 2004
- Darts: 23g Shot
- Laterality: Right-handed
- Walk-on music: "Celebration" by Kool & the Gang

Organisation (see split in darts)
- PDC: 2023–
- Current world ranking: (WDF) 135 ▼68 (17 August 2026)

PDC premier events – best performances
- World Championship: Last 96: 2024
- Grand Slam: Quarter-final: 2023

Other tournament wins
- Years
DPFL Live Event	2025
CDC Continental Cup	2023
Gibraltar Open	2024
Oregon Open	2010
Washington Area Open	2023
CDC Pro Tour (x9)
2023 (x3), 2024 (x2), 2025 (x4)

Stowe Buntz (born January 25, 1979) is an American professional darts player who competes in Professional Darts Corporation (PDC) events. He is active in the Championship Darts Circuit (CDC), the North American affiliate of the PDC; he has won nine CDC Pro Tour titles, as well as the 2023 CDC Continental Cup. He reached his first PDC major quarter-final at the 2023 Grand Slam.

== Career ==
In October 2023, Buntz won the 2023 CDC Continental Cup his beaten by America's Jason Brandon by 8–6 to secure his place at the 2023 Grand Slam of Darts. This came after placing as the second-ranked American on the 2023 CDC Tour to lock in his debut at the 2024 PDC World Darts Championship, a rank made possible after becoming the first player in CDC history to win three tour events in the same weekend. In November, Buntz was drawn into Group E with Peter Wright, Dave Chisnall, and Stephen Bunting. His debut match on his first televised major event was against former two-time world champion Peter Wright, where he won 5–1. In his next match, he faced Stephen Bunting, defeating him 5–3, before losing his last match in his group to Dave Chisnall 5–4; however, despite the loss, he still topped first in the group. In the last 16, Buntz defeated the runner-up of Group F, Andrew Gilding, 10–5 before exiting the tournament at the quarterfinals in a rematch against Stephen Bunting, losing 16–8.

At the 2024 PDC World Darts Championship, Buntz played Kevin Doets in the opening match of the tournament, with the winner to face defending champion Michael Smith in the next round. Buntz lost 3–0 to Doets.

Buntz was a part of the field for the 2024 US Darts Masters as the CDC Continental Cup winner. He lost to Nathan Aspinall in the first round.

He qualified for the 2025 PDC World Darts Championship, where he lost to Nick Kenny 3–0 in the first round.

== World Championship results ==
=== PDC ===
- 2024: First round (lost to Kevin Doets 0–3)
- 2025: First round (lost to Nick Kenny 0–3)
- 2026: First round (lost to James Hurrell 1–3)

== Performance timeline ==
Tournament	2023	2024	2025	2026
PDC Ranked televised events
World Championship	DNQ	1R	1R	1R
Grand Slam	QF	DNQ	DNQ	
PDC Non-ranked televised events
World Cup	DNQ			2R
Career statistics
Season-end ranking (PDC)	91	145	144	
