= Veijo Viinikka =

Finnish darts player

Personal information
- Born: 27 March 1966 (age 60) Jyväskylä, Finland
- Home town: Jyväskylä, Finland

Sport
- Sport: Darts
- Playing since: 1998
- Darts: 25 gram Matchstick
- Laterality: Right-handed
- Walk-on music: "Burn It to the Ground" by Nickelback

Organisation (see split in darts)
- BDO: 2002–2010
- PDC: 2011–

WDF major events – best performances
- World Masters: Last 128: 2002

PDC premier events – best performances
- World Championship: Last 72: 2011

Other tournament wins
- Tournament: Years
- Hungarian Open PDC World Finland Qualifying Event Sawo Open SDC Pro Tour SDC Denmark: 2006; 2010; 2013 2012

Veijo Viinikka (born 27 March 1966) is a Finnish professional darts player.

He competed in the 2011 PDC World Darts Championship, losing 4–2 to Roland Scholten in the preliminary round. He made his European Tour debut for German Darts Championship, but he lost to David Pallett in the first round. He made his PDC World Cup debut for Finland in 2020, but he and Marko Kantele lost to Germany 0–5.

== World Championship performances ==
=== PDC ===
- 2011: Preliminary round (lost to Roland Scholten 2–4) (legs)
