= Danny Baggish =

American darts player (born 1983)

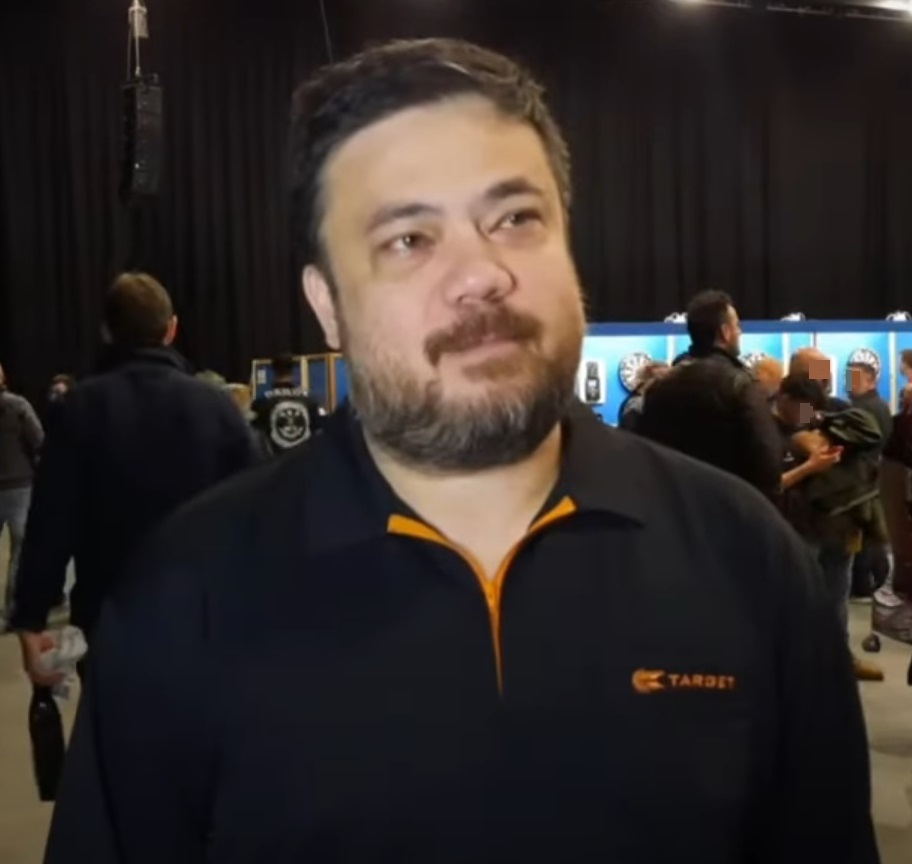
- Baggish in 2022

Personal information
- Nickname: "The Gambler"
- Born: August 19, 1983 (age 43) Hagåtña, Guam
- Home town: Lakeland, Florida, U.S.

Sport
- Sport: Darts
- Playing since: 2003
- Darts: 23g Target Signature
- Laterality: Right-handed
- Walk-on music: "The Gambler" by Kenny Rogers

Organisation (see split in darts)
- BDO: 2011–2019
- PDC: 2007–2008, 2019–present
- WDF: 2020

WDF major events – best performances
- World Masters: Last 64: 2019

PDC premier events – best performances
- World Championship: Last 32: 2021
- UK Open: Last 96: 2022
- World Series Finals: Last 24: 2022

Other tournament wins
- Years
North American Championship	2019
CDC Pro Tour (×10)	2019 (×1); 2020 (×3); 2022 (×2)
Cherry Bomb International (×2)	2019, 2023
Port City Open	2023
Witch City Open	2019
Virginia Beach Classic	2023

Daniel Baggish (born August 19, 1983) is an American professional darts player. He had a PDC tour card from 2021 to 2022, after being the only American player to win one at Q-School in 2021. He is sponsored by Target Darts, and has been a member of Team Target since 2019.

== Career ==
He first came to prominence in 2019, when he was one of 8 North American qualifiers who played in the 2019 US Darts Masters, where he lost 6–1 to Daryl Gurney in the first round. He went on to defeat Elliot Milk and Leonard Gates, before beating Jeff Smith in the final of the North American Championship, which meant he qualified for the 2020 PDC World Darts Championship.

He then won a CDC Pro Tour event in Philadelphia, defeating Joe Huffman in the final.

Baggish became the first American player to qualify for a PDC European Tour event by qualifying for the 2022 German Darts Grand Prix. At the tournament, he beat Thomas Junghans to become the first American to win a European Tour game.

== World Championship results ==
=== PDC ===
- 2020: Second round (lost to Nathan Aspinall 1–3)
- 2021: Third round (lost to Glen Durrant 2–4)
- 2023: Second round (lost to Mervyn King 2–3)

== Performance timeline ==
=== BDO ===
Tournament	2019
World Masters	L64

=== PDC ===
Tournament	2020	2021	2022	2023
PDC Ranked televised events
World Championship	2R	3R	DNQ	2R
UK Open	DNP	2R	3R	DNP
PDC Non-ranked televised events
World Cup	DNP		1R	DNP

==== Players Championships ====
Season	1	2	3	4	5	6	7	8	9	10	11	12	13	14	15	16	17	18	19	20	21	22	23	24	25	26	27	28	29	30
2021	BOL; 1R	BOL; 1R	BOL; 2R	BOL; 1R	MIL; 1R	MIL; 1R	MIL; 3R	MIL; 1R	NIE; 1R	NIE; 1R	NIE; 1R	NIE; 2R	MIL; 1R	MIL; 1R	MIL; 1R	MIL; 2R	COV; 1R	COV; 3R	COV; 1R	COV; 1R	BAR; 1R	BAR; 1R	BAR; 2R	BAR; 2R	BAR; 1R	BAR; 2R	BAR; 4R	BAR; 2R	BAR; 1R	BAR; 3R
2022	BAR; 1R	BAR; 1R	WIG; 1R	WIG; 2R	BAR; 2R	BAR; 1R	NIE; DNP		BAR; 1R	BAR; 1R	BAR; 1R	BAR; 1R	BAR; 1R	WIG; DNP		NIE; 2R	NIE; 2R	BAR; 1R	BAR; 1R	BAR; 2R	BAR; 1R	BAR; 1R	BAR; 4R	BAR; 1R	BAR; 3R	BAR; 3R	BAR; 2R	BAR; 2R	BAR; 2R	BAR; 1R

Performance Table Legend
W	Won the tournament	F	Finalist	SF	Semifinalist	QF	Quarterfinalist	#R; RR; L#	Lost in # round Round-robin; Last # stage	DQ	Disqualified
DNQ	Did not qualify	DNP	Did not participate	WD	Withdrew	NH	Tournament not held	#R; RR; L#	Lost in # round Round-robin; Last # stage	NYF	Not yet founded
