= Chuck Puleo =

American darts player

Personal information
- Nickname: "Pipes"
- Born: September 20, 1972 (age 54) Everett, Massachusetts, U.S.
- Home town: Mesa, Arizona, U.S.

Sport
- Sport: Darts
- Playing since: 1991
- Darts: 24g Winmau
- Laterality: Right-handed
- Walk-on music: "I'm Shipping Up to Boston" by Dropkick Murphy

Organisation (see split in darts)
- PDC: 2017–2023

PDC premier events – best performances
- World Championship: Last 96: 2019

Other tournament wins
- Years
CDC Pro Tour
CDC Pro Tour (Chicago)	2018
CDC Pro Tour (New York City)	2018
CDC Pro Tour (Philadelphia)	2018

Chuck Puleo (born September 20, 1972) is an American professional darts player who plays in Professional Darts Corporation (PDC) events.

He qualified for the 2019 PDC World Darts Championship as the highest-ranked American finisher in the 2018 CDC Pro Tour. He was drawn to play against the twice World Youth Champion Dimitri Van den Bergh of Belgium, and despite neither player playing anywhere near top form, Van den Bergh won the match 3–0.

Puleo, along with Darin Young, represented the United States at the 2019 PDC World Cup of Darts.

== World Championship results ==
=== PDC ===
- 2019: First round: (lost to Dimitri Van den Bergh 0–3)
