= Nico Kurz =

German darts player

Personal information
- Born: 31 January 1997 (age 29) Hanau, Germany
- Home town: Nidderau, Germany

Sport
- Sport: Darts
- Playing since: 2014
- Darts: 20 Gram
- Laterality: Right-handed
- Walk-on music: "Live Is Life" by Opus

Organisation (see split in darts)
- PDC: 2016–

PDC premier events – best performances
- World Championship: Last 32: 2020

Other tournament wins
- Years
German Super League	2020
PDC European Development Tour	2021

Nico Kurz (born 31 January 1997) is a German darts player currently playing in Professional Darts Corporation (PDC) events.

In 2018, he qualified as a German Superleague qualifier for the 2018 German Darts Masters in the 2018 World Series of Darts, but lost 6–5 against Jamie Lewis. He made his European Tour debut by qualifying for the 2019 European Darts Open but lost 6–5 against Kim Huybrechts after missing seven match darts.

At the 2019 German Darts Masters Kurz caused a huge upset by beating world number three Gary Anderson 6–4 in the first round and hitting a maximum 170 finish in the match, but lost 6–8 to Peter Wright in the Quarter-finals.

== World Championship results ==
=== PDC ===
- 2020: Third round (lost to Luke Humphries 2–4)
- 2021: Second round (lost to Gabriel Clemens 1–3)

== Performance timeline ==
PDC

Tournament	2019	2020	2021	2022	2023
PDC World Championship	3R	2R	DNQ		
Career statistics
Season-end ranking	87	96	–	171	

PDC European Tour

Season	1	2	3	4	5	6	7	8	9	10	11	12	13
2019	EDO; 1R	GDC; DNQ	GDG; DNP	GDO; DNQ	ADO; DNP	EDG; DNP	DDM; DNP	DDO; DNP	CDO; DNP	ADC; DNP	EDM; DNQ	IDO; DNQ	GDT; DNP
2020	BDC; DNP	GDC; DNQ	EDG; DNQ	IDO; DNP									
2021	Did not play												
2022	IDO; 2R	GDC; DNQ	GDG; DNQ	ADO; DNQ	EDO; 1R	CDO; DNQ	EDG; DNQ	DDC; DNP	EDM; DNQ	HDT; DNP	GDO; DNQ	BDO; DNP	GDT; DNP
2023	BSD; DNQ	EDO; 1R	IDO; DNQ	GDG; DNQ	ADO; DNQ	DDC; DNP	BDO; DNP	CDO; DNP	EDG; 1R	EDM; DNQ	GDO; 1R	HDT; DNP	GDC; 3R

Performance Table Legend
W	Won the tournament	F	Finalist	SF	Semifinalist	QF	Quarterfinalist	#R; RR; Prel.	Lost in # round Round-robin; Preliminary round	DQ	Disqualified
DNQ	Did not qualify	DNP	Did not participate	WD	Withdrew	NH	Tournament not held	#R; RR; Prel.	Lost in # round Round-robin; Preliminary round	NYF	Not yet founded
