= 2023 German Darts Open =

Darts tournament

2023 Interwetten German Darts Open

Tournament information
- Dates: 8–10 September 2023
- Venue: Sparkassen-Arena
- Location: Jena, Germany
- Organisation(s): Professional Darts Corporation (PDC)
- Format: Legs
- Prize fund: £175,000
- Winner's share: £30,000
- High checkout: 164 Daryl Gurney

Champion(s)
- Krzysztof Ratajski

The 2023 Interwetten German Darts Open was the eleventh of thirteen PDC European Tour events on the 2023 PDC Pro Tour. The tournament took place at the Sparkassen-Arena, Jena, Germany from 8-10 September 2023. It featured a field of 48 players and £175,000 in prize money, with £30,000 going to the winner.

The defending champion was Peter Wright, who defeated Dimitri Van den Bergh 8–6 in the 2022 final. However, he was beaten by Cameron Menzies 4–6 in the second round.

Krzysztof Ratajski won his second European Tour title, defeating Stephen Bunting 8–3 in the final.

== Prize money ==
The prize money was increased for the first time in 4 years for all European Tours:

Stage (num. of players)		Prize money
Winner	(1)	£30,000
Runner-up	(1)	£12,000
Semi-finalists	(2)	£8,000
Quarter-finalists	(4)	£6,000
Third round losers	(8)	£4,000
Second round losers	(16)	£2,500*
First round losers	(16)	£1,250
Total	£175,000	

- Seeded players who lose in the second round of the event shall not be credited with prize money on any Order of Merit. A player who qualifies as a qualifier, but later becomes a seed due to the withdrawal of one or more other players shall be credited with their prize money on all Orders of Merit regardless of how far they progress in the event.

== Qualification and format ==
The top 16 entrants from the PDC ProTour Order of Merit on 15 August 2023 automatically qualified for the event and were seeded in the second round.

The remaining 32 places went to players from six qualifying events – 24 from the Tour Card Holder Qualifier (held on 28 August), two from the Associate Member Qualifier (held on 20 May), the two highest ranked Germans automatically qualified, alongside two from the Host Nation Qualifier (held on 20 May), one from the Nordic & Baltic Associate Member Qualifier (held on 3 June), and one from the East European Associate Member Qualifier (held on 3 June).

The following players took part in the tournament:

Top 16

1. Dave Chisnall (third round)
2. Damon Heta (second round)
3. Luke Humphries (third round)
4. Dirk van Duijvenbode (quarter-finals)
5. Josh Rock (semi-finals)
6. Rob Cross (second round)
7. Joe Cullen (second round)
8. Peter Wright (second round)
9. Danny Noppert (quarter-finals)
10. Martin Schindler (third round)
11. Nathan Aspinall (third round)
12. Ryan Searle (third round)
13. José de Sousa (third round)
14. Ross Smith (second round)
15. Andrew Gilding (quarter-finals)
16. Krzysztof Ratajski (champion)

Tour Card Qualifier
- James Wade (first round)
- Simon Whitlock (first round)
- Kevin Doets (second round)
- Gian van Veen (second round)
- Stephen Bunting (runner-up)
- Callum Goffin (first round)
- Daryl Gurney (second round)
- Brian Raman (quarter-finals)
- George Killington (first round)
- Madars Razma (second round)
- Dylan Slevin (second round)
- Mickey Mansell (first round)
- Mike De Decker (second round)
- Ricky Evans (second round)
- Cameron Menzies (third round)
- Stephen Burton (first round)
- Florian Hempel (third round)
- Alan Soutar (first round)
- Darius Labanauskas (first round)
- Jules van Dongen (second round)
- Steve Lennon (first round)
- Connor Scutt (first round)
- Luke Woodhouse (second round)
- Daniel Klose (first round)

Associate Member Qualifier
- Wesley Plaisier (semi-finals)
- Roy van de Griendt (second round)

Highest Ranking Germans
- Gabriel Clemens (first round)
- Ricardo Pietreczko (second round)

Host Nation Qualifier
- Danny Teßmann (first round)
- Nico Kurz (first round)

Nordic & Baltic Qualifier
- Jeffrey de Graaf (first round)

East European Qualifier
- Patrik Kovács (first round)

== Draw ==
First round (best of 11 legs); 8 September
Luke Woodhouse 98.45	6
Gabriel Clemens 94.55	5
Alan Soutar 75.65	0
Ricky Evans 94.93	6
Darius Labanauskas 87.88	5
Cameron Menzies 90.65	6
Dylan Slevin 87.20	6
Jeffrey de Graaf 85.65	4
Roy van de Griendt 78.44	6
Danny Teßmann 77.63	3
Patrik Kovács 89.59	1
Mike De Decker 94.18	6
Connor Scutt 88.33	3
Jules van Dongen 95.40	6
Kevin Doets 96.39	6
Callum Goffin 83.23	2
Florian Hempel 97.19	6
James Wade 94.36	3
Madars Razma 96.31	6
Stephen Burton 89.04	1
Stephen Bunting 91.59	6
Mickey Mansell 94.85	4
Daryl Gurney 92.88	6
Steve Lennon 83.29	2
Daniel Klose 96.27	4
Ricardo Pietreczko 94.08	6
Wesley Plaisier 99.81	6
George Killington 96.02	4
Brian Raman 84.20	6
Nico Kurz 78.77	3
Simon Whitlock 94.82	1
Gian van Veen 95.03	6

Second round (best of 11 legs); 9 September
1	Dave Chisnall 102.86	6
Luke Woodhouse 89.16	1
16	Krzysztof Ratajski 99.63	6
Ricky Evans 92.52	3
8	Peter Wright 89.15	4
Cameron Menzies 92.27	6
9	Danny Noppert 89.86	6
Dylan Slevin 91.79	5
4	Dirk van Duijvenbode 93.76	6
Roy van de Griendt 87.88	4
13	José de Sousa 88.34	6
Mike De Decker 86.04	4
5	Josh Rock 108.48	6
Jules van Dongen 98.80	2
12	Ryan Searle 95.23	6
Kevin Doets 93.62	3
2	Damon Heta 91.88	2
Florian Hempel 91.15	6
15	Andrew Gilding 86.19	6
Madars Razma 78.94	2
7	Joe Cullen 96.45	5
Stephen Bunting 92.19	6
10	Martin Schindler 93.15	6
Daryl Gurney 98.14	5
3	Luke Humphries 98.43	6
Ricardo Pietreczko 94.77	5
14	Ross Smith 94.22	2
Wesley Plaisier 101.79	6
6	Rob Cross 94.20	5
Brian Raman 91.61	6
11	Nathan Aspinall 86.23	6
Gian van Veen 92.48	3

Third round (best of 11 legs); 10 September
1	Chisnall 92.83	2
16	Ratajski 89.58	6
Menzies 91.61	4
9	Noppert 92.15	6
4	van Duijvenbode 98.12	6
13	de Sousa 96.32	3
5	Rock 98.13	6
12	Searle 91.68	5
Hempel 86.11	3
15	Gilding 89.10	6
Bunting 98.21	6
10	Schindler 92.01	1
3	Humphries 92.09	5
Plaisier 97.92	6
Raman 93.23	6
11	Aspinall 86.90	4

Quarter-finals (best of 11 legs); 10 September
16	Ratajski 92.83	6
9	Noppert 89.87	3
4	van Duijvenbode 100.16	5
5	Rock 98.25	6
15	Gilding 93.43	5
Bunting 90.56	6
Plaisier 93.04	6
Raman 86.65	3

Semi-finals (best of 13 legs); 10 September
16	Ratajski 95.23	7
5	Rock 95.77	4
Bunting 95.21	7
Plaisier 90.35	6

Final (best of 15 legs); 10 September
16	Ratajski 93.68	8
Bunting 92.50	3
