= Florian Hempel =

German darts player (born 1990)

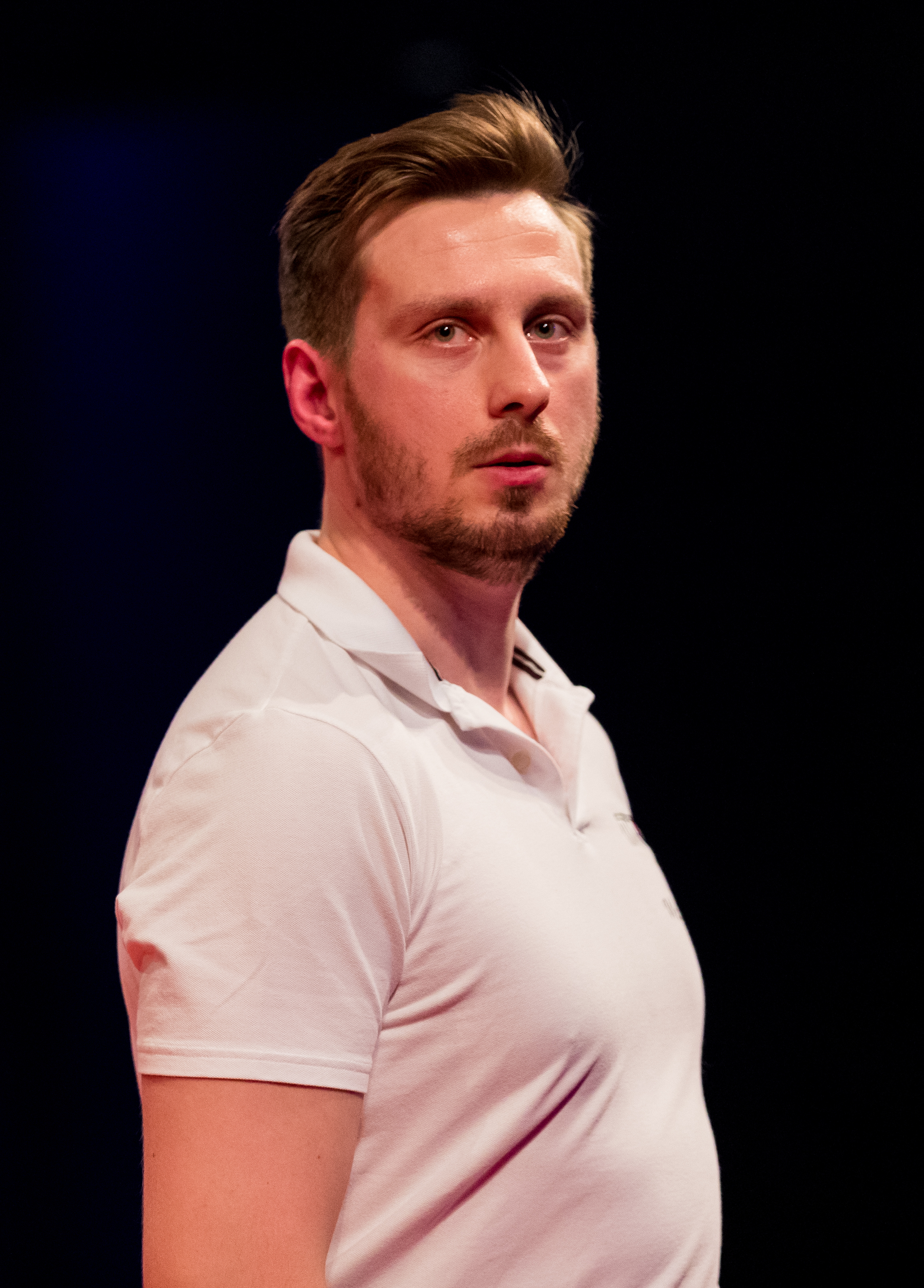
- Hempel in 2019

Personal information
- Full name: Florian Hempel
- Born: 10 April 1990 (age 36) Dessau, East Germany
- Home town: Cologne, Germany

Sport
- Sport: Darts
- Playing since: 2017
- Darts: 21g Winmau Signature
- Laterality: Right-handed
- Walk-on music: "Kölsche Jung" by Brings

Organisation (see split in darts)
- PDC: 2018–present (Tour Card: 2021–2025)
- Current world ranking: (PDC) 172 ▼2 (18 October 2026)

WDF major events – best performances
- Dutch Open: Last 64: 2026

PDC premier events – best performances
- World Championship: Last 32: 2022, 2024
- UK Open: Last 64: 2022, 2023, 2024
- European Championship: Last 16: 2021
- PC Finals: Last 32: 2024
- Masters: Last 32: 2025

Florian Hempel (born 10 April 1990) is a German professional darts player and former handball player who competes in Professional Darts Corporation (PDC) events.

Hempel began his sporting career in handball, playing as a goalkeeper for Dessau-Roßlauer HV, where he made his professional debut in 2010, and later played for HC Burgenland. Achieving little success, Hempel quit the sport and began playing darts. He made his PDC European Tour debut in the 2019 Dutch Darts Masters, and gained his tour card in 2021. He has since qualified for four World Championships, reaching the last 32 on two occasions.

== Early life and career ==
Born in Dessau, East Germany, Hempel was a goalkeeper in handball, beginning his career with SG Kühnau, before moving to Dessau-Roßlauer HV in the 2010–11 2. Handball-Bundesliga season. This proved to be his only appearance in the division, and made a further two appearances in the third tier. In 2016, Hempel ended his handball career in Cologne with Longericher Sport Club, where he had moved to advance his educational studies; he eventually qualified as a fitness coach and nutritionist.

== Darts career ==
Hempel began playing darts in his flat in 2017, and in 2018 quit his job, registered for unemployment benefits, and took on darts as a full-time job.

On his PDC European Tour debut at the Dutch Darts Masters in May 2019, he whitewashed Ryan Harrington 6–0. Hempel lost to Simon Whitlock 6–3 in the second round.

Having previously attempted to gain a Tour Card in both 2018 and 2020, Hempel won a PDC Tour Card at 2021 European Q-School, winning the event 3 final. In March, he withdrew from the UK Open due to family reasons. In April, he completed his first nine-dart finish during a European Super League whitewash victory over Marco Obst.

Hempel made his PDC televised debut in October at the 2021 European Championship, eliminating reigning champion Peter Wright 6–3. The following week, he reached his first semi-final on the PDC Pro Tour before losing there 7–3 to Michael Smith. Ahead of his PDC World Darts Championship debut, Hempel featured as a guest commentator on Sport1 for the 2021 Grand Slam of Darts. During the 2022 PDC World Darts Championship, Hempel caused a "major upset" when he defeated fifth seed Dimitri Van den Bergh in the second round, averaging 98.37, and described it as "madness". He would go on to lose 4–1 to Australia's Raymond Smith in the third round.

=== 2024 ===
At the 2024 World Championship, Hempel faced Dylan Slevin in the first round. Slevin won the first set and hit a 167 checkout in the second set, but Hempel managed to mount a comeback to win the match 3–1. In the second round, Hempel defeated Dimitri Van den Bergh 3–2, despite losing the first two sets. The match was a repeat of the 2022 second round tie which Hempel also won. In the third round, Hempel was whitewashed 0–4 by Stephen Bunting.

== World Championship results ==
=== PDC ===
- 2022: Third round (lost to Raymond Smith 1–4)
- 2023: Second round (lost to Luke Humphries 2–3)
- 2024: Third round (lost to Stephen Bunting 0–4)
- 2025: Second round (lost to Daryl Gurney 2–3)

== Performance timeline ==
| Tournament | 2021 | 2022 | 2023 | 2024 | 2025 | 2026 |
|---|---|---|---|---|---|---|
| PDC World Championship | DNQ | 3R | 2R | 3R | 2R | DNQ |
| PDC World Masters | DNQ | | | | 1R | DNQ |
| UK Open | WD | 4R | 4R | 4R | 3R | DNQ |
| European Championship | 2R | DNQ | | | | |
| Players Championship Finals | DNQ | | | 2R | DNQ | |
Career statistics
| Season-end ranking | 62 | 50 | 60 | 53 | 72 | |

=== PDC European Tour ===
| Season | 1 | 2 | 3 | 4 | 5 | 6 | 7 | 8 | 9 | 10 | 11 | 12 | 13 |
|---|---|---|---|---|---|---|---|---|---|---|---|---|---|
| 2019 | Did not qualify | | | | | | DDM; 2R | DNQ | | | EDM; 1R | DNQ | |
| 2021 | HDT; 2R | GDT; 2R | | | | | | | | | | | |
| 2022 | IDO; 1R | DNQ | | | | CDO; 1R | DNQ | | EDM; 2R | DNQ | | | |
| 2023 | BSD; 1R | EDO; 1R | IDO; 2R | GDG; 1R | Did not qualify | | | | | | GDO; 3R | HDT; DNQ | GDC; 1R |
| 2024 | Did not qualify | | | | | | | | | | HDT; 2R | SDT; DNQ | CDO; 1R |

=== PDC Players Championships ===
| Season | 1 | 2 | 3 | 4 | 5 | 6 | 7 | 8 | 9 | 10 | 11 | 12 | 13 | 14 | 15 | 16 | 17 | 18 | 19 | 20 | 21 | 22 | 23 | 24 | 25 | 26 | 27 | 28 | 29 | 30 | 31 | 32 | 33 | 34 |
|---|---|---|---|---|---|---|---|---|---|---|---|---|---|---|---|---|---|---|---|---|---|---|---|---|---|---|---|---|---|---|---|---|---|---|
| 2021 | Did not participate | | | | | | | | NIE; 1R | NIE; 1R | NIE; 2R | NIE; 1R | MIL; DNP | | | | COV; 3R | COV; 2R | COV; 2R | COV; 3R | BAR; 3R | BAR; 1R | BAR; 1R | BAR; 2R | BAR; 2R | BAR; 1R | BAR; SF | BAR; 1R | BAR; 4R | BAR; 1R | | | | |
| 2022 | BAR; 1R | BAR; 2R | WIG; 1R | WIG; 2R | BAR; 1R | BAR; 2R | NIE; 1R | NIE; 1R | BAR; 1R | BAR; 1R | BAR; 1R | BAR; 4R | BAR; 3R | WIG; 1R | WIG; QF | NIE; 1R | NIE; 1R | BAR; 2R | BAR; 2R | BAR; 1R | BAR; 1R | BAR; 3R | BAR; 1R | BAR; 3R | BAR; 2R | BAR; 1R | BAR; 2R | BAR; 3R | BAR; 2R | BAR; 1R | | | | |
| 2023 | BAR; 2R | BAR; 1R | BAR; 1R | BAR; 2R | BAR; 1R | BAR; 2R | HIL; 2R | HIL; 2R | WIG; DNP | | LEI; 2R | LEI; 1R | HIL; 1R | HIL; 3R | LEI; 1R | LEI; 1R | HIL; 3R | HIL; 1R | BAR; 1R | BAR; 4R | BAR; 3R | BAR; 1R | BAR; 1R | BAR; 2R | BAR; 1R | BAR; 2R | BAR; 2R | BAR; 4R | BAR; 1R | BAR; 1R | | | | |
| 2024 | WIG; 1R | WIG; 2R | LEI; 1R | LEI; 4R | HIL; 3R | HIL; 1R | LEI; DNP | | HIL; 1R | HIL; 1R | HIL; 2R | HIL; 2R | MIL; 2R | MIL; 3R | MIL; 1R | MIL; 3R | MIL; SF | MIL; 2R | MIL; 2R | WIG; 3R | WIG; 2R | LEI; 1R | LEI; 1R | WIG; 1R | WIG; 1R | WIG; 2R | WIG; 1R | WIG; 3R | LEI; 3R | LEI; 2R | | | | |
| 2025 | WIG; 1R | WIG; QF | ROS; 2R | ROS; 1R | LEI; 2R | LEI; 1R | HIL; 1R | HIL; 2R | LEI; 1R | LEI; 1R | LEI; 2R | LEI; 1R | ROS; 1R | ROS; 1R | HIL; 1R | HIL; 1R | LEI; 2R | LEI; 1R | LEI; 3R | LEI; DNP | | HIL; 1R | HIL; 2R | MIL; 3R | MIL; 3R | HIL; 1R | HIL; 1R | LEI; 2R | LEI; 1R | LEI; 1R | WIG; 2R | WIG; 2R | WIG; 2R | WIG; 2R |

Performance Table Legend
| W | Won the tournament | F | Finalist | SF | Semifinalist | QF | Quarterfinalist | #R; RR; Prel. | Lost in # round Round-robin; Preliminary round | DQ | Disqualified |
| DNQ | Did not qualify | DNP | Did not participate | WD | Withdrew | NH | Tournament not held | #R; RR; Prel. | Lost in # round Round-robin; Preliminary round | NYF | Not yet founded |
