= 2023 German Darts Championship =

Darts tournament

2023 Interwetten German Darts Championship

Tournament information
- Dates: 13–15 October 2023
- Venue: Halle 39
- Location: Hildesheim, Germany
- Organisation(s): Professional Darts Corporation (PDC)
- Format: Legs
- Prize fund: £175,000
- Winner's share: £30,000
- Nine-dart finish: Scott Waites
- High checkout: 170 Michael van Gerwen

Champion(s)
- Ricardo Pietreczko (GER)

The 2023 German Darts Championship (known for sponsorship reasons as the 2023 Interwetten German Darts Championship) was the thirteenth of thirteen PDC European Tour events on the 2023 PDC Pro Tour. The tournament took place at Halle 39, Hildesheim, Germany from 13 to 15 October 2023. It featured a field of 48 players and £175,000 in prize money, with £30,000 going to the winner.

The defending champion was Michael van Gerwen, who defeated Rob Cross 8–5 in the 2022 final, but he lost 6–7 to Ricardo Pietreczko in the semi-finals.

Pietreczko won his first European Tour and his first PDC ranking title as well, defeating Peter Wright 8–4 in the final without missing a single dart at a double. He became only the second German player to win a PDC ranking title, and the first since Max Hopp in 2019.

Scott Waites hit a nine-dart finish in his first round loss against George Killington.

== Prize money ==
The prize money was increased for the first time in 4 years for all European Tours:

Stage (num. of players)		Prize money
Winner	(1)	£30,000
Runner-up	(1)	£12,000
Semi-finalists	(2)	£8,500
Quarter-finalists	(4)	£6,000
Third round losers	(8)	£4,000
Second round losers	(16)	£2,500*
First round losers	(16)	£1,250
Total	£175,000	

- Seeded players who lost in the second round of the event were not credited with prize money on any Order of Merit.

== Qualification and format ==
The top 16 entrants from the PDC Pro Tour Order of Merit on 23 August 2023 automatically qualified for the event and are seeded in the second round.

The remaining 32 places went to players from six qualifying events – 24 from the Tour Card Holder Qualifier (held on 6 September), two from the Associate Member Qualifier (held on 21 May), the two highest ranked Germans automatically qualified, alongside two from the Host Nation Qualifier (held on 12 October), one from the Nordic & Baltic Associate Member Qualifier (held on 15 July), and one from the East European Associate Member Qualifier (held on 4 June).

Gerwyn Price withdrew and was replaced by Ross Smith from the Reserve List. Under PDC Rules, Price is replaced as a seed by the player ranked highest on the ProTour OoM at the entry deadline, which was also Smith.

The following players took part in the tournament:

Top 16

1. Dave Chisnall (second round)
2. Damon Heta (quarter-finals)
3. Luke Humphries (semi-finals)
4. Dirk van Duijvenbode (second round)
5. Josh Rock (second round)
6. Rob Cross (quarter-finals)
7. Jonny Clayton (second round)
8. Michael van Gerwen (semi-finals)
9. Joe Cullen (third round)
10. Peter Wright (runner-up)
11. Michael Smith (third round)
12. Danny Noppert (second round)
13. Martin Schindler (second round)
14. Nathan Aspinall (second round)
15. Ryan Searle (second round)
16. Ross Smith (third round)

Tour Card Qualifier
- Mickey Mansell (first round)
- Chris Dobey (second round)
- Steve Lennon (second round)
- Jules van Dongen (third round)
- Vincent van der Voort (first round)
- Jeff Smith (first round)
- James Wade (third round)
- Danny Jansen (first round)
- Martin Lukeman (third round)
- Scott Waites (first round)
- Boris Krčmar (second round)
- Gian van Veen (second round)
- Stephen Bunting (quarter-finals)
- Ryan Joyce (first round)
- Dylan Slevin (first round)
- Alan Soutar (second round)
- Daryl Gurney (second round)
- Lee Evans (first round)
- Florian Hempel (first round)
- Madars Razma (first round)
- Karel Sedláček (first round)
- James Wilson (first round)
- George Killington (third round)
- Arron Monk (second round)

Associate Member Qualifier
- Darryl Pilgrim (second round)
- Jelle Klaasen (first round)

Highest Ranking Germans
- Gabriel Clemens (quarter-finals)
- Ricardo Pietreczko (champion)

Host Nation Qualifier
- Marcus Kirchmann (first round)
- Nico Kurz (third round)

Nordic & Baltic Qualifier
- Jeffrey de Graaf (first round)

East European Qualifier
- Patrik Kovács (first round)

== Draw ==
First round (best of 11 legs); 13 October
Gabriel Clemens 95.00	6
Danny Jansen 90.71	3
Vincent van der Voort 87.89	2
Daryl Gurney 95.09	6
Steve Lennon 90.18	6
Marcus Kirchmann 77.56	3
Florian Hempel 91.69	4
Arron Monk 85.18	6
Scott Waites 95.28	5
George Killington 91.05	6
Ricardo Pietreczko 91.57	6
Mickey Mansell 86.94	4
Stephen Bunting 93.44	6
Jeffrey de Graaf 92.73	5
Patrik Kovács 78.68	2
Jules van Dongen 94.27	6
Jeff Smith 83.26	1
Darryl Pilgrim 102.88	6
Martin Lukeman 90.19	6
Madars Razma 88.53	5
Dylan Slevin 90.76	2
Nico Kurz 92.59	6
Chris Dobey 93.87	6
Lee Evans 93.80	5
Boris Krčmar 88.63	6
Ryan Joyce 81.28	4
Jelle Klaasen 94.58	2
James Wade 94.31	6
James Wilson 91.01	4
Gian van Veen 94.12	6
Karel Sedláček 88.95	1
Alan Soutar 91.82	6

Second round (best of 11 legs); 14 October
1	Dave Chisnall 99.38	2
Gabriel Clemens 100.99	6
16	Ross Smith 102.21	6
Daryl Gurney 97.22	3
8	Michael van Gerwen 90.38	6
Steve Lennon 88.44	3
9	Joe Cullen 95.73	6
Arron Monk 90.78	4
4	Dirk van Duijvenbode 80.93	0
George Killington 103.66	6
13	Martin Schindler 96.53	2
Ricardo Pietreczko 107.08	6
5	Josh Rock 95.62	3
Stephen Bunting 101.70	6
12	Danny Noppert 100.73	2
Jules van Dongen 101.32	6
2	Damon Heta 94.46	6
Darryl Pilgrim 90.84	4
15	Ryan Searle 96.31	4
Martin Lukeman 89.94	6
7	Jonny Clayton 91.54	5
Nico Kurz 93.67	6
10	Peter Wright 94.26	6
Chris Dobey 98.50	2
3	Luke Humphries 106.23	6
Boris Krčmar 92.63	2
14	Nathan Aspinall 102.23	4
James Wade 98.53	6
6	Rob Cross 98.96	6
Gian van Veen 92.40	5
11	Michael Smith 91.43	6
Alan Soutar 89.56	5

Third round (best of 11 legs); 15 October
Clemens 87.86	6
16	R. Smith 84.80	4
8	van Gerwen 96.72	6
9	Cullen 90.09	5
Killington 92.36	2
Pietreczko 96.35	6
Bunting 90.99	6
van Dongen 91.53	5
2	Heta 90.72	6
Lukeman 89.16	5
Kurz 86.54	3
10	Wright 92.93	6
3	Humphries 111.33	6
Wade 94.81	0
6	Cross 102.16	6
11	M. Smith 100.83	5

Quarter-finals (best of 11 legs); 15 October
Clemens 90.36	5
8	van Gerwen 94.26	6
Pietreczko 102.23	6
Bunting 103.74	4
2	Heta 89.03	4
10	Wright 97.73	6
3	Humphries 105.86	6
6	Cross 96.37	4

Semi-finals (best of 13 legs); 15 October
8	van Gerwen 98.15	6
Pietreczko 99.15	7
10	Wright 101.59	7
3	Humphries 101.00	5

Final (best of 15 legs); 15 October
Pietreczko 92.93	8
10	Wright 85.08	4
