= 2022 European Darts Open =

2022 edition of European Darts Open

2022 Interwetten European Darts Open

Tournament information
- Dates: 6–8 May 2022
- Venue: Ostermann-Arena
- Location: Leverkusen
- Country: Germany
- Organisation(s): PDC
- Format: Legs
- Prize fund: £140,000
- Winner's share: £25,000
- High checkout: 164 Michael van Gerwen

Champion(s)
- Michael van Gerwen

The 2022 Interwetten European Darts Open was the fifth of thirteen PDC European Tour events on the 2022 PDC Pro Tour. The tournament took place at the Ostermann-Arena, Leverkusen, Germany, from 6–8 May 2022. It featured a field of 48 players and £140,000 in prize money, with £25,000 going to the winner.

Michael van Gerwen entered the event as defending champion, having defeated Rob Cross 8–6 in the 2019 final. He successfully defended his title with an 8–5 win over Dimitri Van den Bergh in the final.

== Prize money ==
The prize money is unchanged from the European Tours of the last 3 years:

Stage (num. of players)		Prize money
Winner	(1)	£25,000
Runner-up	(1)	£10,000
Semi-finalists	(2)	£6,500
Quarter-finalists	(4)	£5,000
Third round losers	(8)	£3,000
Second round losers	(16)	£2,000*
First round losers	(16)	£1,000*
Total	£140,000	

- Seeded players who lose in the second round and host nation qualifiers (who qualify automatically as a result of their ranking) who lose in their first match of the event shall not be credited with prize money on any Order of Merit. A player who qualifies as a qualifier, but later becomes a seed due to the withdrawal of one or more other players shall be credited with their prize money on all Orders of Merit regardless of how far they progress in the event.

== Qualification and format ==
The top 16 entrants from the PDC ProTour Order of Merit on 16 March automatically qualified for the event and were seeded in the second round.

The remaining 32 places went to players from six qualifying events – 24 from the Tour Card Holder Qualifier (held on 18 March), two from the Associate Member Qualifier (held on 22 April), the two highest ProTour ranking German players, two from the Host Nation Qualifier (held on 22 April), one from the Nordic & Baltic Associate Member Qualifier (held on 19 February), and one from the East European Associate Member Qualifier (held on 6 March).

Danny Baggish withdrew from the event for personal reasons, so Karel Sedláček received a bye into the second round.

Due to illness, James Wade withdrew from his semi-final match, so Dimitri Van den Bergh received a bye into the final.

The following players took part in the tournament:

Top 16

1. Gerwyn Price (third round)
2. Peter Wright (second round)
3. José de Sousa (third round)
4. Joe Cullen (third round)
5. Michael van Gerwen (champion)
6. Ryan Searle (quarter-finals)
7. Dimitri Van den Bergh (runner-up)
8. Luke Humphries (semi-finals)
9. Brendan Dolan (third round)
10. Rob Cross (second round)
11. Damon Heta (second round)
12. Jonny Clayton (third round)
13. Dirk van Duijvenbode (quarter-finals)
14. James Wade (semi-finals, withdrew)
15. Krzysztof Ratajski (second round)
16. Nathan Aspinall (quarter-finals)

Tour Card Qualifier
- Kevin Burness (first round)
- Krzysztof Kciuk (second round)
- Daryl Gurney (second round)
- Connor Scutt (first round)
- Mickey Mansell (first round)
- Cameron Menzies (second round)
- Stephen Bunting (first round)
- Ritchie Edhouse (first round)
- Dave Chisnall (third round)
- Luke Woodhouse (second round)
- Rowby-John Rodriguez (second round)
- Josh Rock (quarter-finals)
- Berry van Peer (second round)
- Keane Barry (first round)
- Maik Kuivenhoven (second round)
- Adam Gawlas (first round)
- Andrew Gilding (second round)
- Kevin Doets (first round)
- Ian White (first round)
- Martin Lukeman (first round)
- Devon Petersen (second round)
- Luc Peters (first round)
- Jermaine Wattimena (first round)

Associate Member Qualifier
- Darren Penhall (second round)
- Scott Williams (third round)

Highest Ranked Germans
- Gabriel Clemens (first round)
- Martin Schindler (third round)

Host Nation Qualifier
- Lukas Wenig (first round)
- Nico Kurz (first round)

Nordic & Baltic Qualifier
- Dennis Nilsson (second round)

East European Qualifier
- Karel Sedláček (second round)

== Draw ==
First round (best of 11 legs); 6 May
Mickey Mansell 94.58	0
Luke Woodhouse 109.98	6
Karel Sedláček	bye
Darren Penhall 100.20	6
Luc Peters 90.54	0
Andrew Gilding 91.29	6
Lukas Wenig 87.02	3
Devon Petersen 87.19	6
Kevin Doets 88.05	5
Stephen Bunting 83.05	5
Maik Kuivenhoven 81.70	6
Daryl Gurney 91.96	6
Kevin Burness 83.11	5
Rowby-John Rodriguez 86.47	6
Nico Kurz 86.68	4
Adam Gawlas 98.51	5
Scott Williams 98.60	6
Josh Rock 98.02	6
Connor Scutt 82.59	0
Cameron Menzies 92.94	6
Ian White 90.51	3
Martin Schindler 97.08	6
Ritchie Edhouse 97.10	2
Dennis Nilsson 92.81	6
Martin Lukeman 89.13	3
Berry van Peer 88.02	6
Jermaine Wattimena 84.85	4
Krzysztof Kciuk 85.82	6
Keane Barry 87.27	3
Dave Chisnall 92.10	6
Gabriel Clemens 88.79	3

Second round (best of 11 legs); 7 May
1	Gerwyn Price 91.32	6
Luke Woodhouse 92.69	4
16	Nathan Aspinall 90.67	6
Karel Sedláček 88.37	2
8	Luke Humphries 99.63	6
Darren Penhall 85.96	2
9	Brendan Dolan 103.66	6
Andrew Gilding 94.66	0
4	Joe Cullen 96.08	6
Devon Petersen 85.23	1
13	Dirk van Duijvenbode 88.21	6
Maik Kuivenhoven 83.38	1
5	Michael van Gerwen 113.79	6
Daryl Gurney 95.04	3
12	Jonny Clayton 96.88	6
Rowby-John Rodriguez 93.84	2
2	Peter Wright 86.84	4
Scott Williams 84.91	6
15	Krzysztof Ratajski 98.78	2
Josh Rock 101.68	6
7	Dimitri Van den Bergh 95.83	6
Cameron Menzies 87.74	1
10	Rob Cross 88.36	4
Martin Schindler 93.06	6
3	José de Sousa 95.09	6
Dennis Nilsson 82.02	5
14	James Wade 102.25	6
Berry van Peer 91.71	1
6	Ryan Searle 102.60	6
Krzysztof Kciuk 89.66	2
11	Damon Heta 99.11	4
Dave Chisnall 100.90	6

Third round (best of 11 legs); 8 May
1	Price 96.25	5
16	Aspinall 99.32	6
8	Humphries 98.47	6
9	Dolan 96.02	4
4	Cullen 99.44	3
13	van Duijvenbode 106.90	6
5	van Gerwen 98.06	6
12	Clayton 99.23	4
Williams 84.07	1
Rock 96.36	6
7	Van den Bergh 105.31	6
Schindler 97.25	4
3	de Sousa 89.18	4
14	Wade 94.82	6
6	Searle 93.57	6
Chisnall 100.62	5

Quarter-finals (best of 11 legs); 8 May
16	Aspinall 100.47	3
8	Humphries 107.87	6
13	van Duijvenbode 91.07	5
5	van Gerwen 93.07	6
Rock 94.90	1
7	Van den Bergh 97.63	6
14	Wade 94.93	6
6	Searle 96.50	5

Semi-finals (best of 13 legs); 8 May
8	Humphries 95.38	2
5	van Gerwen 105.26	7
7	Van den Bergh	w/o
14	Wade	w/d

Final (best of 15 legs); 8 May
5	van Gerwen 102.49	8
7	Van den Bergh 89.54	5
