= 2022 International Darts Open =

2022 edition of International Darts Open

2022 Interwetten International Darts Open

Tournament information
- Dates: 25–27 February 2022
- Venue: SACHSENarena
- Location: Riesa, Germany
- Organisation(s): Professional Darts Corporation (PDC)
- Format: Legs
- Prize fund: £140,000
- Winner's share: £25,000
- High checkout: 170 Jermaine Wattimena; James Wade

Champion(s)
- Gerwyn Price

The 2022 Interwetten International Darts Open was the first of thirteen PDC European Tour events on the 2022 PDC Pro Tour. The tournament took place at the SACHSENarena, Riesa from 25 to 27 February 2022. It featured a field of 48 players and £140,000 in prize money, with £25,000 going to the winner.

Joe Cullen was the defending champion after defeating Michael van Gerwen 8–5 in the 2020 final, but lost to Nathan Aspinall in the third round.

Gerwyn Price won his sixth European Tour title after beating Peter Wright 8–4 in the final, retaining his status as world number one, which he would have surrendered to Wright had he lost.

== Prize money ==
The prize money was unchanged from the European Tours of the last 3 years:

Stage (num. of players)		Prize money
Winner	(1)	£25,000
Runner-up	(1)	£10,000
Semi-finalists	(2)	£6,500
Quarter-finalists	(4)	£5,000
Third round losers	(8)	£3,000
Second round losers	(16)	£2,000*
First round losers	(16)	£1,000
Total	£140,000	

- Seeded players who lose in the second round of the event shall not be credited with prize money on any Order of Merit. A player who qualifies as a qualifier, but later becomes a seed due to the withdrawal of one or more other players shall be credited with their prize money on all Orders of Merit regardless of how far they progress in the event.

== Qualification and format ==
The top 16 entrants from the PDC ProTour Order of Merit on 28 June 2021 automatically qualified for the event and were seeded in the second round.

The remaining 32 places went to players from six qualifying events – 24 from the Tour Card Holder Qualifier (held on 9 July 2021), one from the Associate Member Qualifiers (held on 5 July 2021 and 23 February (Note: In 2021, Associate Member qualifiers were held in the EU and UK; however the relevant UK qualifier was not held for this event.)), four from the Host Nation Qualifier (held on 24 February), one from the Nordic & Baltic Associate Member Qualifier (held in 2021), and one from the East European Associate Member Qualifier (held in 2021).

As three qualifying events were held in 2021, but only two actual events were held, the qualifiers for the third event of 2021 were carried over to the first event of 2022. This resulted in Wayne Jones competing as a Tour Card holder despite having lost his Tour Card. Players who had entered either of the qualifiers that took place in 2021 were not eligible to enter a qualifier in 2022; and players who had gained a Tour Card since the 2021 qualifier were eligible to enter the Associate Member qualifier for this event.

Ryan Joyce withdrew prior to the event. A fifth place was made available to the Host Nation Qualifier.

The following players took part in the tournament:

Top 16

1. Joe Cullen (third round)
2. José de Sousa (second round)
3. Peter Wright (runner-up)
4. Michael van Gerwen (third round)
5. Gerwyn Price (champion)
6. Michael Smith (quarter-finals)
7. Jonny Clayton (semi-finals)
8. James Wade (quarter-finals)
9. Devon Petersen (second round)
10. Krzysztof Ratajski (second round)
11. Dirk van Duijvenbode (third round)
12. Damon Heta (third round)
13. Danny Noppert (quarter-finals)
14. Brendan Dolan (second round)
15. Mensur Suljović (second round)
16. Nathan Aspinall (semi-finals)

Tour Card Qualifier
- Kim Huybrechts (third round)
- Florian Hempel (first round)
- Dimitri Van den Bergh (quarter-finals)
- Jermaine Wattimena (first round)
- Rob Cross (first round)
- Luke Woodhouse (second round)
- Martin Lukeman (first round)
- Krzysztof Kciuk (second round)
- Daryl Gurney (second round)
- Jeff Smith (second round)
- Ritchie Edhouse (second round)
- Madars Razma (second round)
- Mervyn King (second round)
- Andy Boulton (first round)
- Ron Meulenkamp (first round)
- Gabriel Clemens (first round)
- Keane Barry (second round)
- Vincent van der Voort (second round)
- Lewy Williams (third round)
- Ryan Searle (first round)
- Wayne Jones (first round)
- Simon Whitlock (second round)
- Adam Gawlas (first round)

Associate Member Qualifier
- Danny van Trijp (first round)
- Brian Raman (third round)

Host Nation Qualifier
- Fabian Schmutzler (first round)
- Niko Springer (third round)
- David Schlichting (first round)
- Dragutin Horvat (first round)
- Nico Kurz (second round)

Nordic & Baltic Qualifier
- Dennis Nilsson (first round)

East European Qualifier
- János Végső (first round)

== Draw ==
First round (best of 11 legs); 25 February
Madars Razma 86.47	6
Wayne Jones 86.92	4
Danny van Trijp 83.58	4
Jeff Smith 87.09	6
Adam Gawlas 97.93	3
Vincent van der Voort 103.69	6
Florian Hempel 85.46	3
Kim Huybrechts 97.52	6
Keane Barry 95.85	6
Ron Meulenkamp 86.03	2
Mervyn King 84.42	6
János Végső 81.48	3
Ryan Searle 85.76	4
Ritchie Edhouse 89.41	6
Fabian Schmutzler 83.86	2
Daryl Gurney 86.74	6
David Schlichting 74.87	3
Brian Raman 80.13	6
Dimitri Van den Bergh 101.44	6
Martin Lukeman 90.00	2
Rob Cross 88.49	1
Krzysztof Kciuk 92.04	6
Lewy Williams 90.38	6
Dennis Nilsson 82.45	4
Luke Woodhouse 95.38	6
Andy Boulton 90.15	2
Jermaine Wattimena 91.39	4
Niko Springer 92.48	6
Simon Whitlock 95.94	6
Dragutin Horvat 75.97	0
Gabriel Clemens 89.67	3
Nico Kurz 87.69	6

Second round (best of 11 legs); 26 February
1	Joe Cullen 96.41	6
Madars Razma 81.12	1
16	Nathan Aspinall 88.26	6
Jeff Smith 87.47	4
8	James Wade 90.45	6
Vincent van der Voort 87.68	4
9	Devon Petersen 84.43	3
Kim Huybrechts 93.17	6
4	Michael van Gerwen 101.91	6
Keane Barry 98.93	4
13	Danny Noppert 89.89	6
Mervyn King 93.66	3
5	Gerwyn Price 99.80	6
Ritchie Edhouse 88.62	3
12	Damon Heta 98.24	6
Daryl Gurney 94.67	2
2	José de Sousa 93.45	5
Brian Raman 90.66	6
15	Mensur Suljović 86.44	1
Dimitri Van den Bergh 98.12	6
7	Jonny Clayton 98.61	6
Krzysztof Kciuk 87.73	5
10	Krzysztof Ratajski 92.51	5
Lewy Williams 92.12	6
3	Peter Wright 88.41	6
Luke Woodhouse 83.03	0
14	Brendan Dolan 93.84	5
Niko Springer 90.98	6
6	Michael Smith 91.94	6
Simon Whitlock 93.41	4
11	Dirk van Duijvenbode 100.20	6
Nico Kurz 82.97	0

Third round (best of 11 legs); 27 February
1	Cullen 87.99	3
16	Aspinall 95.49	6
8	Wade 100.11	6
Huybrechts 101.18	1
4	van Gerwen 94.80	4
13	Noppert 94.69	6
5	Price 102.16	6
12	Heta 94.98	2
Raman 86.60	1
Van den Bergh 99.11	6
7	Clayton 96.34	6
Williams 90.64	4
3	Wright 97.70	6
Springer 94.75	2
6	Smith 102.58	6
11	van Duijvenbode 92.72	1

Quarter-finals (best of 11 legs); 27 February
16	Aspinall 102.00	6
8	Wade 99.89	2
13	Noppert 87.12	4
5	Price 99.10	6
Van den Bergh 94.09	4
7	Clayton 87.43	6
3	Wright 98.33	6
6	Smith 91.50	5

Semi-finals (best of 13 legs); 27 February
16	Aspinall 89.05	3
5	Price 95.56	7
7	Clayton 96.95	3
3	Wright 95.67	7

Final (best of 15 legs); 27 February
5	Price 106.95	8
3	Wright 106.74	4
