= Dylan Slevin =

Irish darts player (born 2002)

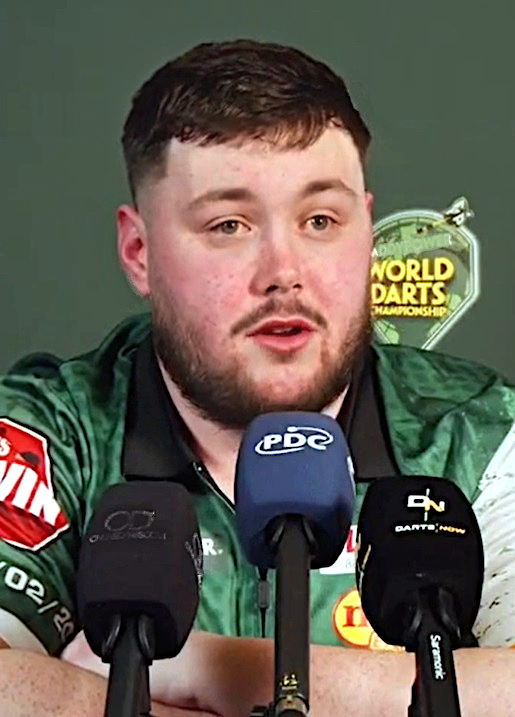
- Slevin in 2024

Personal information
- Nicknames: "Ocean's", "Slevinator"
- Born: 19 November 2002 (age 23) Borrisokane, County Tipperary, Ireland

Sport
- Sport: Darts
- Playing since: 2014
- Darts: 25g Mission Signature
- Laterality: Left-handed
- Walk-on music: "Crazy Crazy Nights" by Kiss

Organisation (see split in darts)
- BDO: 2018–2020
- PDC: 2023– (Tour Card: 2023–2025)
- WDF: 2018–2022

PDC premier events – best performances
- World Championship: Last 64: 2025
- UK Open: Last 32: 2025
- PC Finals: Last 64: 2023

Other tournament wins
- Years
Youth events
Irish Open	2019
PDC Development Tour	2023
Medal record
Men's Darts
Representing Ireland
WDF Europe Cup Youth
Gold medal – first place	2019 Ankara	Boys team
Bronze medal – third place	2018 Ankara	Boys team

Dylan Slevin (born 19 November 2002) is an Irish professional darts player who competes in Professional Darts Corporation (PDC) events. Nicknamed "Ocean's", Slevin was a PDC Tour Card holder from 2023 to 2025. On his PDC Pro Tour debut, Slevin reached the semi-finals at 2023 Players Championship 1.

In his youth career, Slevin won 2023 Development Tour 2. He also won two medals in the WDF Europe Cup Youth representing Ireland.

== Career ==
=== Early career ===
Slevin was a leading youth player in Ireland. As a member of the Irish youth (boys) team, he won the medal twice in the WDF Europe Cup Youth, bronze in 2018 and gold in 2019.

=== 2022 ===
In November 2022, he participated in the Irish Open. On his way to the final, he defeated several of the top players in the World Darts Federation ranking, including Nick Kenny, Neil Duff, Richard Veenstra and Chris Landman. In the final, he lost to Jelle Klaasen by 3–6 in legs. In the Irish Classic, he ended his participation in the fourth round after losing to Dennie Olde Kalter by 3–4 in legs. This year, Slevin participated in the PDC Development Tour, reaching the semi-finals twice. He managed to qualify for the PDC World Youth Championship 2022, in the group stage, he remained unbeaten and would eventually reach the quarter-finals, in which he lost 4–6 with Josh Rock.

=== 2023 ===
In January 2023, he took part in the PDC Q-School qualifying tournament. On the fourth day of the tournament finals, he obtained a PDC Tour Card for the next two years. In early February, he made his debut at 2023 PDC Players Championship 1. He advanced to the semi-finals, where he lost to Jamie Hughes 7–2 in legs.

He took part in the 2023 UK Open where he defeated Maik Kuivenhoven, Shaun Wilkinson and Robbie Knops, before losing to Joe Cullen 10–7 in legs. In March he won his first PDC Development Tour title, winning 2023 Development Tour 2 by beating Luke Littler 5–4 in the final. Slevin made his PDC European Tour debut at the 2023 Austrian Darts Open where he lost to John Henderson 6–4 in legs. He appeared in seven European Tour events during the season, but failed to qualify for 2023 European Championship.

He finished on 65th place of Players Championship Order of Merit, initially not qualifying for 2023 Players Championship Finals. However, ninth seed Danny Noppert withdrew prior to the tournament due to the imminent birth of his second child and Slevin came directly into the draw to replace him. In the first round he lost in a deciding leg to Matt Campbell 6–5.

Slevin was able to qualify for 2024 PDC World Darts Championship, finishing in 50th place on the PDC Pro Tour Order of Merit.

=== 2024 ===
At the World Championship, Slevin lost to Florian Hempel. 3–1 in the first round, despite winning the first set and hitting a 167 checkout in the second set.

He made it to the semi finals of the 2024 PDC World Youth Championship, but lost to eventual champion Gian van Veen.

After not initially qualifying for the 2025 PDC World Darts Championship, Slevin was one of four players to qualify for the event through the Tour Card Holder qualifier. He was drawn against Irish compatriot William O'Connor in the first round and beat O'Connor 3–1 in sets. Slevin lost in the second round to Dimitri Van den Bergh.

== World Championship results ==
=== PDC ===
- 2024: First round (lost to Florian Hempel 1–3)
- 2025: Second Round (lost to Dimitri Van den Bergh 0–3)

== Performance timeline ==
Tournament	2022	2023	2024	2025	2026
PDC Ranked televised events
World Championship	DNQ		1R	2R	DNQ
World Masters	DNQ			Prel.	DNQ
UK Open	DNQ	4R	3R	5R	
Players Championship Finals	DNP	1R	DNQ		
PDC Non-ranked televised events
World Youth Championship	QF	2R	SF	3R	4R
Career statistics
Season-end ranking (PDC)	–	82	58	79	

PDC European Tour

Season	1	2	3	4	5	6	7	8	9	10	11	12	13	14
2023	DNQ				ADO; 1R	DDC; 2R	BDO; 1R	CDO; 1R	EDG; 1R	EDM; DNQ	GDO; 2R	HDT; DNQ	GDC; 1R	
2024	DNP		IDO; 1R	Did not qualify				EDO; 2R	GDC; 2R	Did not qualify				
2025	Did not qualify									FDT; 2R	Did not qualify			

PDC Players Championships

Season	1	2	3	4	5	6	7	8	9	10	11	12	13	14	15	16	17	18	19	20	21	22	23	24	25	26	27	28	29	30	31	32	33	34
2023	BAR; SF	BAR; 1R	BAR; 2R	BAR; 3R	BAR; 3R	BAR; 1R	HIL; 2R	HIL; 1R	WIG; 3R	WIG; 1R	LEI; 1R	LEI; 1R	HIL; 1R	HIL; 1R	LEI; 4R	LEI; 2R	HIL; 1R	HIL; 1R	BAR; 2R	BAR; 1R	BAR; 1R	BAR; 2R	BAR; 2R	BAR; 1R	BAR; 2R	BAR; 1R	BAR; 1R	BAR; 2R	BAR; 2R	BAR; 2R				
2024	WIG; DNP	WIG; DNP	LEI; 2R	LEI; 1R	HIL; 2R	HIL; 4R	LEI; 2R	LEI; 2R	HIL; 1R	HIL; 1R	HIL; 2R	HIL; 1R	MIL; 1R	MIL; 1R	MIL; 3R	MIL; 1R	MIL; 1R	MIL; 1R	MIL; 2R	WIG; 2R	WIG; 1R	MIL; 1R	MIL; 2R	WIG; 1R	WIG; 1R	WIG; 2R	WIG; 1R	WIG; 2R	LEI; 1R	LEI; 2R				
2025	WIG; 3R	WIG; 1R	ROS; 1R	ROS; 1R	LEI; 3R	LEI; 2R	HIL; 1R	HIL; QF	LEI; 1R	LEI; 2R	LEI; 2R	LEI; 1R	ROS; 2R	ROS; 2R	HIL; 1R	HIL; 1R	LEI; 2R	LEI; 1R	LEI; 1R	LEI; 1R	LEI; 1R	HIL; 3R	HIL; 1R	MIL; 2R	MIL; 1R	HIL; 2R	HIL; 3R	LEI; 1R	LEI; 1R	LEI; 1R	WIG; 1R	WIG; 1R	WIG; 1R	WIG; 3R

Performance Table Legend
W	Won the tournament	F	Finalist	SF	Semifinalist	QF	Quarterfinalist	#R; RR; L#	Lost in # round Round-robin; Last # stage	DQ	Disqualified
DNQ	Did not qualify	DNP	Did not participate	WD	Withdrew	NH	Tournament not held	#R; RR; L#	Lost in # round Round-robin; Last # stage	NYF	Not yet founded
