= Jules van Dongen =

Dutch-American darts player

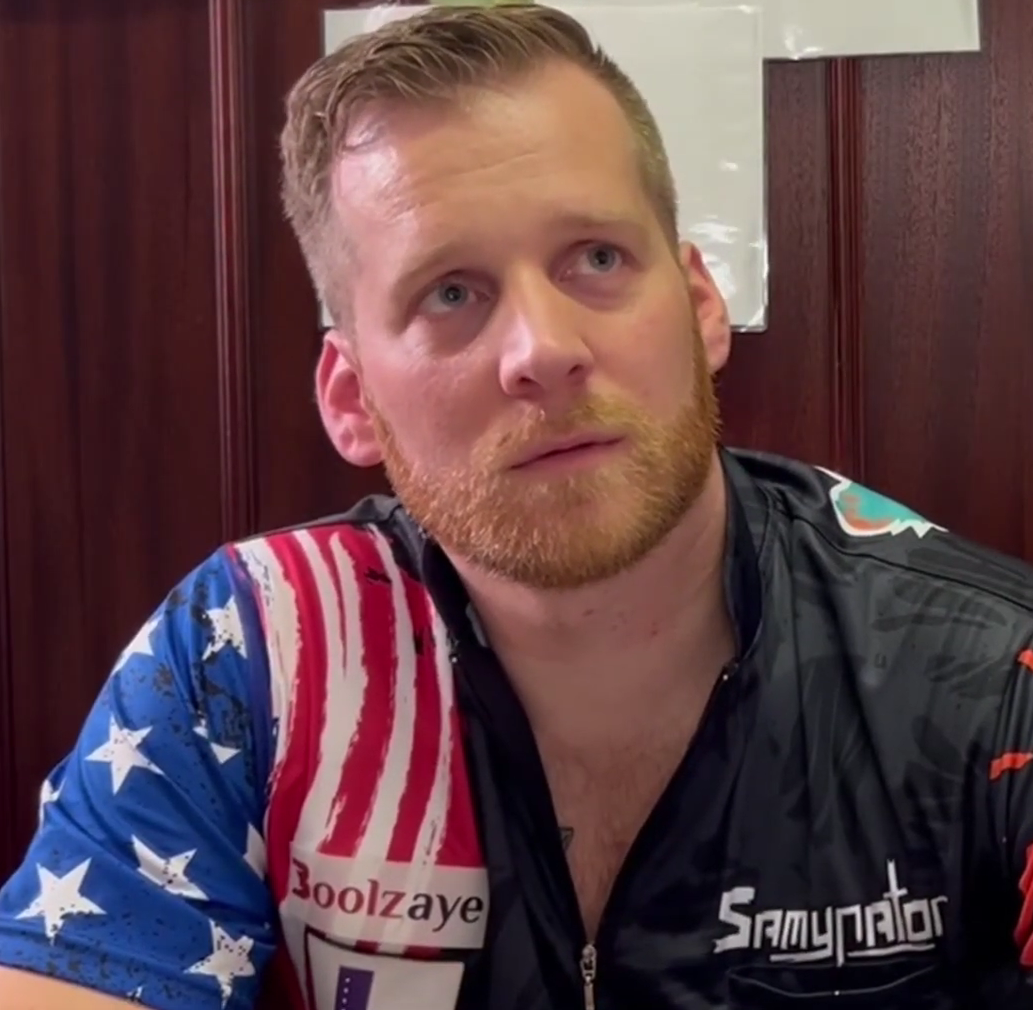
- van Dongen in 2023

Personal information
- Nickname: "The Dutch Dragon"
- Born: July 13, 1990 (age 36) Meerssen, Netherlands
- Home town: Parkville, Missouri, U.S.

Sport
- Sport: Darts
- Playing since: 2020
- Darts: 23g Winmau Signature
- Laterality: Left-Handed
- Walk-on music: "Lekkah!" by Spitnoise (Samynator Remix)

Organisation (see split in darts)
- PDC: 2022–2025 (Tour Card: 2022–2025)

WDF major events – best performances
- World Championship: Last 32: 2022

PDC premier events – best performances
- World Championship: Last 96: 2024
- UK Open: Last 128: 2022, 2023
- PC Finals: Last 64: 2023

Other tournament wins
- Years
Charlotte Open	2021
Cherry Bomb International	2021
Seacoast Open	2021
CDC Pro Tour (Wheeling)	2023

Jules van Dongen (born July 13, 1990) is a Dutch-American professional darts player who competes in Professional Darts Corporation (PDC) events. He won a PDC affiliate tour event on the 2023 Championship Darts Corporation (CDC) Pro Tour.

== Career ==
At Q-School in 2022, van Dongen won his Tour Card by finishing second on the European Q-School Order of Merit, to get himself a two-year card on the PDC circuit.

Van Dongen qualified as a seed for the 2022 WDF World Darts Championship, which he was allowed to play after getting special dispensation from the PDC, but he would lose in the second round to Ryan de Vreede.

Having lost his Tour Card at the end of 2023 by being outside the top 64 of the PDC rankings, van Dongen immediately won his Tour Card back at the 2024 European Q-School.

== World Championship results ==
=== WDF World Championship ===
- 2022: Second round (lost to Ryan de Vreede 1–3)

=== PDC World Championship ===
- 2024: First round (lost to Darren Penhall 1–3)

== Performance timeline ==
=== WDF ===
Tournament	2022
WDF Ranked televised events
World Championship	2R

=== PDC ===
Tournament	2022	2023	2024	2025	2026
PDC Ranked televised events
World Championship	DNQ		1R	DNQ	
UK Open	2R	2R	1R	1R	
Players Championship Finals	DNQ	1R	DNQ		
PDC Non-ranked televised events
World Cup	1R	RR	RR	RR	
Career statistics
Season-end ranking (PDC)	142	78	171	187	

==== European Tour ====
Season	1	2	3	4	5	6	7	8	9	10	11	12	13
2022	Did not qualify					CDO; 2R	Did not qualify						
2023	DNQ			GDG; 1R	Did not qualify						GDO; 2R	HDT; DNQ	GDC; 3R

==== Players Championships ====
Season	1	2	3	4	5	6	7	8	9	10	11	12	13	14	15	16	17	18	19	20	21	22	23	24	25	26	27	28	29	30	31	32	33	34
2022	BAR; 1R	BAR; 1R	WIG; 1R	WIG; 2R	BAR; 1R	BAR; 1R	NIE; 1R	NIE; 2R	BAR; 1R	BAR; 1R	BAR; 1R	BAR; 1R	BAR; 1R	WIG; 1R	WIG; 1R	NIE; 1R	NIE; 1R	BAR; 1R	BAR; 1R	BAR; 1R	BAR; 1R	BAR; 2R	BAR; 1R	BAR; 3R	BAR; 3R	BAR; 3R	BAR; 1R	BAR; 1R	BAR; 1R	BAR; 2R				
2023	BAR; 1R	BAR; 2R	BAR; 1R	BAR; 2R	BAR; 2R	BAR; 1R	HIL; 1R	HIL; 1R	WIG; 1R	WIG; 1R	LEI; 2R	LEI; 2R	HIL; 1R	HIL; 1R	LEI; 3R	LEI; 3R	HIL; 2R	HIL; 2R	BAR; 2R	BAR; 4R	BAR; 2R	BAR; 4R	BAR; 1R	BAR; 4R	BAR; 3R	BAR; 2R	BAR; 2R	BAR; 2R	BAR; 1R	BAR; 1R				
2024	WIG; 2R	WIG; 1R	LEI; 1R	LEI; 1R	HIL; 1R	HIL; 1R	LEI; 1R	LEI; 1R	HIL; 1R	HIL; 2R	HIL; 2R	HIL; 1R	MIL; DNP		MIL; 1R	MIL; 1R	MIL; 1R	MIL; 1R	MIL; 1R	WIG; DNP		LEI; 2R	LEI; 1R	WIG; 1R	WIG; 1R	WIG; 1R	WIG; 1R	WIG; 1R	LEI; 1R	LEI; 1R				
2025	WIG; 1R	WIG; 1R	ROS; 1R	ROS; 1R	Did not participate																												WIG; 1R	WIG; 1R

Performance Table Legend
W	Won the tournament	F	Finalist	SF	Semifinalist	QF	Quarterfinalist	#R; RR; Prel.	Lost in # round Round-robin; Preliminary round	DQ	Disqualified
DNQ	Did not qualify	DNP	Did not participate	WD	Withdrew	NH	Tournament not held	#R; RR; Prel.	Lost in # round Round-robin; Preliminary round	NYF	Not yet founded
