= 2023 Players Championship Finals =

2023 Cazoo Players Championship Finals

Tournament information
- Dates: 24–26 November 2023
- Venue: Butlin's Minehead
- Location: Minehead, England
- Organisation(s): Professional Darts Corporation (PDC)
- Format: Legs
- Prize fund: £600,000
- Winner's share: £120,000
- Nine-dart finish: Michael van Gerwen
- High checkout: 164; Stephen Bunting; Jermaine Wattimena

Champion(s)
- Luke Humphries (ENG)

The 2023 Cazoo Players Championship Finals was the sixteenth edition of the Professional Darts Corporation (PDC) darts tournament, which sees the top 64 players from the 2023 PDC Players Championship series taking part. The tournament took place from 24 to 26 November 2023 at the Butlin's Resort, Minehead.

Michael van Gerwen was the defending champion after defeating Rob Cross 11–6 in the 2022 final to win the title for the seventh time.

Luke Humphries won his first Players Championship Finals title and third Premier title, beating Van Gerwen 11–9 in the final. Van Gerwen hit a nine-dart finish in the final.

== Prize money ==
The 2023 Players Championship Finals had a prize fund of £600,000, up from £500,000

The following is the breakdown of the fund:

Position (no. of players)		Prize money (Total: £600,000)
Winner	(1)	£120,000
Runner-Up	(1)	£60,000
Semi-finalists	(2)	£30,000
Quarter-finalists	(4)	£20,000
Last 16 (Third round)	(8)	£10,000
Last 32 (Second round)	(16)	£6,500
Last 64 (First round)	(32)	£3,000

== Qualification ==
The top 64 players from the Players Championships Order of Merit qualified, which was solely based on prize money won in the 30 Players Championship events during the season.

Ninth seed Danny Noppert withdrew prior to the tournament due to the imminent birth of his second child. Dylan Slevin came directly into the draw to replace him.

Another notable absentee was Peter Wright who failed to qualify to the PC Finals for the first time since the inaugural 2009 event.

The following players qualified:

Click on the seed number of a player to go to their draw section.

=== Top 64 in the Players Championship Order of Merit ===
1. Gerwyn Price (second round)
2. Gary Anderson (second round)
3. Damon Heta (quarter-finals)
4. Dave Chisnall (third round)
5. Josh Rock (second round)
6. Dirk van Duijvenbode (first round)
7. Luke Humphries (champion)
8. Ross Smith (second round)
9. ~~Danny Noppert~~ (withdrew)
10. Ryan Searle (third round)
11. Ryan Joyce (semi-finals)
12. Jonny Clayton (second round)
13. Rob Cross (second round)
14. Krzysztof Ratajski (first round)
15. James Wade (quarter-finals)
16. Stephen Bunting (quarter-finals)
17. Gian van Veen (second round)
18. Andrew Gilding (first round)
19. Brendan Dolan (third round)
20. Luke Woodhouse (quarter-finals)
21. Daryl Gurney (first round)
22. Joe Cullen (second round)
23. Ricardo Pietreczko (second round)
24. Mike De Decker (first round)
25. Callan Rydz (first round)
26. Radek Szagański (second round)
27. Michael Smith (first round)
28. Gabriel Clemens (semi-finals)
29. Chris Dobey (second round)
30. José de Sousa (first round)
31. Dimitri Van den Bergh (third round)
32. Kim Huybrechts (third round)
33. Martin Schindler (first round)
34. Jim Williams (first round)
35. Kevin Doets (second round)
36. Raymond van Barneveld (first round)
37. Connor Scutt (first round)
38. Richard Veenstra (second round)
39. Ian White (first round)
40. Michael van Gerwen (runner-up)
41. Mario Vandenbogaerde (third round)
42. Christian Kist (first round)
43. Jamie Hughes (first round)
44. Niels Zonneveld (third round)
45. Simon Whitlock (first round)
46. Ritchie Edhouse (first round)
47. Steve Lennon (second round)
48. Chris Landman (first round)
49. Mickey Mansell (first round)
50. William O'Connor (first round)
51. Maik Kuivenhoven (second round)
52. Cameron Menzies (first round)
53. Stephen Burton (first round)
54. Daniel Klose (first round)
55. Boris Krčmar (first round)
56. Matt Campbell (second round)
57. Scott Williams (first round)
58. Martin Lukeman (first round)
59. Jermaine Wattimena (third round)
60. Rowby-John Rodriguez (first round)
61. Lee Evans (first round)
62. Jules van Dongen (first round)
63. Steve Beaton (first round)
64. Ricky Evans (first round)
65. Dylan Slevin (first round)

== Draw ==
There was no draw held, all players were put in a fixed bracket by their seeding positions.

=== Finals ===
Quarter-finals (best of 19 legs); 26 November
16	Stephen Bunting 100.08	9
40	Michael van Gerwen 107.07	10
20	Luke Woodhouse 91.41	7
28	Gabriel Clemens 98.75	10
15	James Wade 92.01	7
7	Luke Humphries 97.99	10
3	Damon Heta 95.69	6
11	Ryan Joyce 95.74	10

Semi-finals (best of 21 legs); 26 November
40	Michael van Gerwen 101.54	11
28	Gabriel Clemens 94.36	6
7	Luke Humphries 106.26	11
11	Ryan Joyce 83.95	3

Final (best of 21 legs); 26 November
40	Michael van Gerwen 103.19	9
7	Luke Humphries 100.75	11

=== Top half ===
==== Section 1 ====
First round (best of 11 legs); 24 November
1	Gerwyn Price 93.94	6
64	Ricky Evans 90.80	0
32	Kim Huybrechts 96.27	6
33	Martin Schindler 88.59	5
16	Stephen Bunting 97.98	6
49	Mickey Mansell 87.79	4
17	Gian van Veen 96.64	6
48	Chris Landman 87.65	1
8	Ross Smith 98.23	6
57	Scott Williams 82.30	2
25	Callan Rydz 76.51	3
40	Michael van Gerwen 97.29	6
Alt/65	Dylan Slevin 82.63	5
56	Matt Campbell 88.56	6
24	Mike De Decker 86.71	1
41	Mario Vandenbogaerde 93.53	6

Second round (best of 11 legs); 25 November
1	Gerwyn Price 85.92	1
32	Kim Huybrechts 92.04	6
16	Stephen Bunting 105.66	6
17	Gian van Veen 90.94	1
8	Ross Smith 104.54	1
40	Michael van Gerwen 118.52	6
56	Matt Campbell 85.00	2
41	Mario Vandenbogaerde 88.62	6

Third round (best of 19 legs); 25 November
32	Kim Huybrechts 88.50	8
16	Stephen Bunting 91.19	10
40	Michael van Gerwen 94.53	10
41	Mario Vandenbogaerde 86.47	6

Quarter-finals (best of 19 legs); 26 November
16	Stephen Bunting 100.08	9
40	Michael van Gerwen 107.07	10

==== Section 2 ====
First round (best of 11 legs); 24 November
4	Dave Chisnall 99.20	6
61	Lee Evans 91.97	2
29	Chris Dobey 90.18	6
36	Raymond van Barneveld 87.75	3
13	Rob Cross 92.39	6
52	Cameron Menzies 85.89	3
20	Luke Woodhouse 92.94	6
45	Simon Whitlock 86.50	4
5	Josh Rock 91.28	6
60	Rowby-John Rodriguez 81.51	4
28	Gabriel Clemens 95.52	6
37	Connor Scutt 90.24	3
12	Jonny Clayton 96.04	6
53	Stephen Burton 87.21	4
21	Daryl Gurney 90.19	3
44	Niels Zonneveld 100.85	6

Second round (best of 11 legs); 25 November
4	Dave Chisnall 109.88	6
29	Chris Dobey 103.43	4
13	Rob Cross 89.87	3
20	Luke Woodhouse 90.74	6
5	Josh Rock 112.27	3
28	Gabriel Clemens 101.93	6
12	Jonny Clayton 91.63	2
44	Niels Zonneveld 98.08	6

Third round (best of 19 legs); 25 November
4	Dave Chisnall 91.22	8
20	Luke Woodhouse 95.31	10
28	Gabriel Clemens 98.60	10
44	Niels Zonneveld 82.15	1

Quarter-finals (best of 19 legs); 26 November
20	Luke Woodhouse 91.41	7
28	Gabriel Clemens 98.75	10

=== Bottom half ===
==== Section 3 ====
First round (best of 11 legs); 24 November
2	Gary Anderson 92.72	6
63	Steve Beaton 87.63	5
31	Dimitri Van den Bergh 93.00	6
34	Jim Williams 96.18	4
15	James Wade 101.49	6
50	William O'Connor 88.95	2
18	Andrew Gilding 85.38	3
47	Steve Lennon 91.49	6
7	Luke Humphries 99.67	6
58	Martin Lukeman 92.17	4
26	Radek Szagański 82.82	6
39	Ian White 82.62	2
10	Ryan Searle 98.32	6
55	Boris Krčmar 93.82	4
23	Ricardo Pietreczko 87.33	6
42	Christian Kist 68.08	1

Second round (best of 11 legs); 25 November
2	Gary Anderson 88.25	5
31	Dimitri Van den Bergh 93.68	6
15	James Wade 92.05	6
47	Steve Lennon 82.71	2
7	Luke Humphries 107.36	6
26	Radek Szagański 98.43	0
10	Ryan Searle 106.62	6
23	Ricardo Pietreczko 103.36	3

Third round (best of 19 legs); 25 November
31	Dimitri Van den Bergh 87.62	6
15	James Wade 91.03	10
7	Luke Humphries 103.70	10
10	Ryan Searle 99.08	7

Quarter-finals (best of 19 legs); 26 November
15	James Wade 92.01	7
7	Luke Humphries 97.99	10

==== Section 4 ====
First round (best of 11 legs); 24 November
3	Damon Heta 90.73	6
62	Jules van Dongen 81.03	1
30	José de Sousa 87.95	5
35	Kevin Doets 84.55	6
14	Krzysztof Ratajski 89.96	4
51	Maik Kuivenhoven 93.32	6
19	Brendan Dolan 91.47	6
46	Ritchie Edhouse 92.43	4
6	Dirk van Duijvenbode 80.05	3
59	Jermaine Wattimena 91.91	6
27	Michael Smith 85.35	3
38	Richard Veenstra 97.36	6
11	Ryan Joyce 97.43	6
54	Daniel Klose 87.24	3
22	Joe Cullen 84.38	6
43	Jamie Hughes 74.61	1

Second round (best of 11 legs); 25 November
3	Damon Heta 88.94	6
35	Kevin Doets 89.89	4
51	Maik Kuivenhoven 88.87	5
19	Brendan Dolan 86.31	6
59	Jermaine Wattimena 103.39	6
38	Richard Veenstra 97.11	5
11	Ryan Joyce 96.22	6
22	Joe Cullen 92.67	4

Third round (best of 19 legs); 25 November
3	Damon Heta 99.50	10
19	Brendan Dolan 92.38	8
59	Jermaine Wattimena 89.09	7
11	Ryan Joyce 89.80	10

Quarter-finals (best of 19 legs); 26 November
3	Damon Heta 95.69	6
11	Ryan Joyce 95.74	10

== Top averages ==
The 118.52 average by Michael van Gerwen in his second round match against Ross Smith was the highest average in the Players Championship Finals since its inception in 2009.

The table lists all players who achieved an average of at least 100 in a match. In the case one player has multiple records, this is indicated by the number in brackets.

#	Player	Round	Average	Result
1	Michael van Gerwen	2R	118.52	Won
2	Josh Rock	2R	112.27	Lost
3	Dave Chisnall	2R	109.88	Won
4	Luke Humphries	2R	107.36	Won
5	Michael van Gerwen (2)	QF	107.07	Won
6	Ryan Searle	2R	106.62	Won
7	Luke Humphries (2)	SF	106.26	Won
8	Stephen Bunting	2R	105.66	Won
9	Ross Smith	2R	104.54	Lost
10	Luke Humphries (3)	3R	103.70	Won
11	Chris Dobey	2R	103.43	Lost
12	Jermaine Wattimena	2R	103.39	Won
13	Ricardo Pietreczko	2R	103.36	Lost
14	Gabriel Clemens	2R	101.93	Won
15	Michael van Gerwen (3)	SF	101.54	Won
16	James Wade	1R	101.49	Won
17	Niels Zonneveld	1R	100.85	Won
18	Stephen Bunting (2)	QF	100.08	Lost
