= 2023 PDC Pro Tour =

Darts tournament series

The 2023 PDC Pro Tour was a series of non-televised darts tournaments organised by the Professional Darts Corporation (PDC). Players Championships and European Tour events are the events that make up the Pro Tour. There were thirty Players Championship events, thirteen PDC European Tour events, 24 events for the Challenge and Development Tours, as well as the Women's Series.

== Prize money ==
On 21 November 2022, it was announced that the prize money for the Women's Series will be doubled in 2023.

The following day, it was announced that the prize money for Challenge/Development Tour events would also increase, with the prize fund going up from £10,000 to £15,000 per event.

On 15 February 2023, it was announced that the prize money for the PDC European Tour events was to increase by 25% with prize funds increasing from £140,000 to £175,000 per event.

This is how the prize money was divided:

Stage	ET	PC	CT/DT	WS
Winner	£30,000	£12,000	£2,500	£2,000
Runner-up	£12,000	£8,000	£1,000	£1,000
Semi-finalists	£8,500	£4,000	£750	£500
Quarter-finalists	£6,000	£3,000	£500	£300
Last 16	£4,000	£2,000	£300	£200
Last 32	£2,500	£1,250	£200	£100
Last 48	£1,250	N/A	N/A	N/A
Last 64	N/A	£750	£75	£50 (Note: Last 64 prize money will only be paid out, if a minimum of 128 participants take part in a Women's Series event.)
Total	£175,000	£100,000	£15,000	£10,000

== PDC Tour Card ==
128 players were granted Tour Cards, which enabled them to participate in all Players Championship events, the UK Open and qualifiers for all European Tour and select televised events.

=== Tour cards ===
The 2023 Tour Cards were awarded to:

- (64) The top 64 players from the PDC Order of Merit after the 2023 World Championship.
- (30) 30 qualifiers from 2022 Q-School not ranked in the top 64 of the PDC Order of Merit following the World Championship.
- (1) The winner of the 2021 UK Challenge Tour (Jim Williams).
  - Jim Williams was also in the top 64 of the PDC Order of Merit, and therefore, one extra Tour Card was awarded to a Q-School qualifier.
- (1) The winner of the 2021 European Challenge Tour (Matt Campbell).
- (1) The winner of the 2021 UK Development Tour (Bradley Brooks).
- (1) The winner of the 2021 European Development Tour (Rusty-Jake Rodriguez).
- (2) Two highest qualifiers from 2022 Challenge Tour (Robert Owen and Danny van Trijp).
- (2) Two highest qualifiers from 2022 Development Tour (Geert Nentjes and Jurjen van der Velde).
- (8) The daily winners from the 2023 Q-Schools.

Afterwards, the playing field was complemented by the highest qualified players from the Q-School Order of Merit until the maximum number of 128 Pro Tour Card players has been reached. In 2023, that meant a total of 19 additional players qualified this way.

=== Q-School ===
The PDC Pro Tour Qualifying School (or Q-School) was split into a UK and European Q-School. Players that are not from Europe could choose which Q-School to compete in.

Q-School was once again split into two stages; with all players who lost their tour cards after the 2023 World Championship and the players who finished from third to sixteenth in the 2022 Challenge Tour and Development Tour Orders of Merit exempted to the final stage. The first stage consisted a block of three days, with the last eight players on each day qualifying into the final stage. A ranking of other players was also produced with players qualifying via that ranking to produce a full list of 128 players for each final stage.

Stage One took place between 9–11 January; with the Final Stage being held between 12 and 15 January. The winner of each day's play in the Final Stage received a PDC Tour Card.

The UK Q-School was held at the Marshall Arena, Milton Keynes, England; with the European Q-School held at Wunderland Kalkar in Kalkar, Germany.

UK Q-School
January 12	January 13	January 14	January 15
(England) Arron Monk	(England) Graham Usher	(England) Josh Payne	(England) Adam Smith-Neale
127 players	125 players	123 players	117 players
European Q-School
January 12	January 13	January 14	January 15
(Netherlands) Jeffrey Sparidaans	(Australia) Corey Cadby	(Netherlands) Jeffrey de Zwaan	(Belgium) Robbie Knops
127 players	125 players	123 players	106 players

An Order of Merit was created for each Q School. For every win after the Last 64, the players were awarded 1 point.

To complete the field of 128 Tour Card Holders, places were allocated down the final stage Q-School Order of Merits in proportion to the number of participants, with 9 cards going to the UK Q-School and 10 going to the European Q-School.

The following players picked up Tour Cards as a result:

UK Q-School Order of Merit

1. (Republic of Ireland) Dylan Slevin
2. (England) Lee Evans
3. (England) Stephen Burton
4. (Wales) Nick Kenny
5. (England) Keegan Brown
6. (England) Adam Warner
7. (England) Graham Hall
8. (Wales) Callum Goffin
9. (Philippines) Christian Perez

European Q-School Order of Merit

1. (Netherlands) Maik Kuivenhoven
2. (Netherlands) Richard Veenstra
3. (Netherlands) Niels Zonneveld
4. (Germany) Pascal Rupprecht
5. (Belgium) Ronny Huybrechts
6. (Czech Republic) Karel Sedláček
7. (France) Jacques Labre
8. (Germany) Daniel Klose
9. (Netherlands) Gian van Veen
10. (Netherlands) Owen Roelofs

== Players Championships ==
There were 30 Players Championship events in 2023.

No.	Date	Venue	Winner	Legs	Runner-up	Ref.
1	Saturday 11 February	Barnsley Metrodome, (England) Barnsley	Ryan Searle (100.75)	8 – 4	Jamie Hughes (93.07)	
2	Sunday 12 February	Barnsley Metrodome, (England) Barnsley	Danny Noppert (100.70)	8 – 3	Simon Whitlock (89.53)	
3	Saturday 18 February	Barnsley Metrodome, (England) Barnsley	Kim Huybrechts (92.60)	8 – 1	Gabriel Clemens (85.89)	
4	Sunday 19 February	Barnsley Metrodome, (England) Barnsley	Dirk van Duijvenbode (100.08)	8 – 2	Ryan Searle (88.66)	
5	Saturday 11 March	Barnsley Metrodome, (England) Barnsley	Ross Smith (93.69)	8 – 6	Gary Anderson (92.12)	
6	Sunday 12 March	Barnsley Metrodome, (England) Barnsley	Dirk van Duijvenbode (103.92)	8 – 4	Ryan Searle (96.97)	
7	Sunday 19 March	Halle 39, (Germany) Hildesheim	Michael van Gerwen (98.29)	8 – 4	Josh Rock (99.75)	
8	Monday 20 March	Halle 39, (Germany) Hildesheim	Gary Anderson (99.77)	8 – 5	Krzysztof Ratajski (93.31)	
9	Saturday 15 April	Robin Park Tennis Centre, (England) Wigan	Krzysztof Ratajski (94.17)	8 – 1	Chris Landman (83.76)	
10	Sunday 16 April	Robin Park Tennis Centre, (England) Wigan	Dirk van Duijvenbode (99.92)	8 – 3	José de Sousa (94.37)	
11	Saturday 20 May	Leicester Arena, (England) Leicester	Rob Cross (101.59)	8 – 3	Mike De Decker (86.94)	
12	Sunday 21 May	Leicester Arena, (England) Leicester	Jonny Clayton (98.30)	8 – 5	Josh Rock (99.52)	
13	Monday 12 June	Halle 39, (Germany) Hildesheim	Michael Smith (93.87)	8 – 7	Gary Anderson (93.96)	
14	Tuesday 13 June	Halle 39, (Germany) Hildesheim	Damon Heta (89.83)	8 – 2	Luke Woodhouse (77.09)	
15	Monday 10 July	Leicester Arena, (England) Leicester	Luke Humphries (98.46)	8 – 7	Dave Chisnall (96.78)	
16	Tuesday 11 July	Leicester Arena, (England) Leicester	Damon Heta (103.55)	8 – 4	Ryan Joyce (88.48)	
17	Saturday 26 August	Halle 39, (Germany) Hildesheim	Gerwyn Price (94.48)	8 – 5	Josh Rock (95.44)	
18	Sunday 27 August	Halle 39, (Germany) Hildesheim	Gerwyn Price (98.52)	8 – 1	Gian van Veen (93.66)	
19	Sunday 3 September	Barnsley Metrodome, (England) Barnsley	Callan Rydz (91.90)	8 – 7	Dave Chisnall (92.51)	
20	Monday 4 September	Barnsley Metrodome, (England) Barnsley	Luke Humphries (94.79)	8 – 6	Kevin Doets (92.97)	
21	Tuesday 5 September	Barnsley Metrodome, (England) Barnsley	Gerwyn Price (96.57)	8 – 6	Daniel Klose (89.99)	
22	Wednesday 27 September	Barnsley Metrodome, (England) Barnsley	Danny Noppert (95.74)	8 – 7	Christian Kist (97.14)	
23	Thursday 28 September	Barnsley Metrodome, (England) Barnsley	Dave Chisnall (103.98)	8 – 3	Luke Humphries (101.94)	
24	Friday 29 September	Barnsley Metrodome, (England) Barnsley	Gary Anderson (103.68)	8 – 4	Ryan Joyce (92.81)	
25	Wednesday 18 October	Barnsley Metrodome, (England) Barnsley	Gary Anderson (97.39)	8 – 4	Josh Rock (91.16)	
26	Thursday 19 October	Barnsley Metrodome, (England) Barnsley	Ryan Joyce (95.80)	8 – 7	Gerwyn Price (96.70)	
27	Friday 20 October	Barnsley Metrodome, (England) Barnsley	Radek Szagański (98.28)	8 – 5	Connor Scutt (89.84)	
28	Saturday 21 October	Barnsley Metrodome, (England) Barnsley	Ross Smith (104.68)	8 – 6	Damon Heta (96.68)	
29	Wednesday 1 November	Barnsley Metrodome, (England) Barnsley	Gerwyn Price (100.31)	8 – 3	Dave Chisnall (87.39)	
30	Thursday 2 November	Barnsley Metrodome, (England) Barnsley	Dave Chisnall (96.46)	8 – 4	Jim Williams (94.19)	

== PDC European Tour ==
The PDC European Tour remained at 13 events for 2023, although there was no event in Gibraltar, ending 10 years of darts on the peninsula.

No.	Date	Event	Location	Winner	Legs	Runner-up	Ref.
1	24–26 February	Baltic Sea Darts Open	(Germany) Kiel, Wunderino Arena	Dave Chisnall (101.31)	8 – 5	Luke Humphries (96.27)	
2	24–26 March	European Darts Open	(Germany) Leverkusen, Ostermann-Arena	Gerwyn Price (96.28)	8 – 7	Dirk van Duijvenbode (98.27)	
3	31 March–2 April	International Darts Open	(Germany) Riesa, SACHSENarena	Gerwyn Price (105.64)	8 – 4	Michael van Gerwen (100.46)	
4	8–10 April	German Darts Grand Prix	(Germany) Munich, Kulturhalle Zenith	Michael Smith (102.88)	8 – 5	Nathan Aspinall (94.63)	
5	21–23 April	Austrian Darts Open	(Austria) Premstätten, Steiermarkhalle	Jonny Clayton (101.36)	8 – 6	Josh Rock (101.47)	
6	28–30 April	Dutch Darts Championship	(Netherlands) Leeuwarden, WTC Expo	Dave Chisnall (99.89)	8 – 5	Luke Humphries (96.31)	
7	5–7 May	Belgian Darts Open	(Belgium) Wieze, Oktoberhallen	Michael van Gerwen (99.69)	8 – 6	Luke Humphries (101.03)	
8	12–14 May	Czech Darts Open	(Czech Republic) Prague, PVA EXPO	Peter Wright (95.68)	8 – 6	Dave Chisnall (97.40)	
9	26–28 May	European Darts Grand Prix	(Germany) Sindelfingen, Glaspalast	Rob Cross (97.73)	8 – 6	Luke Humphries (104.22)	
10	30 June–2 July	European Darts Matchplay	(Germany) Trier, Trier Arena	Luke Humphries (93.27)	8 – 7	Dirk van Duijvenbode (91.06)	
11	8–10 September	German Darts Open	(Germany) Jena, Sparkassen-Arena	Krzysztof Ratajski (93.68)	8 – 3	Stephen Bunting (92.50)	
12	22–24 September	Hungarian Darts Trophy	(Hungary) Budapest, MVM Dome	Dave Chisnall (104.82)	8 – 7	Luke Humphries (100.97)	
13	13–15 October	German Darts Championship	(Germany) Hildesheim, Halle 39	Ricardo Pietreczko (92.93)	8 – 4	Peter Wright (85.08)	

== PDC Challenge Tour ==
The Challenge Tour will once again consist of 4 weekends of 5 events, and 1 weekend of 4 events. The top 2 players on the Order of Merit get a PDC Tour Card and a place at the 2024 PDC World Darts Championship, meanwhile the winner of the Order of Merit gets a spot at the 2023 Grand Slam of Darts as well. The Challenge Tour rankings are additionally used to top up Players Championship events should not all 128 Tour Card holders choose to enter. Furthermore, the eight highest ranked players from the 2023 Challenge Tour without a tour card for the 2024 season qualified for the first round of the 2024 UK Open.

2023 Challenge Tour ranking
Rank	Player	Earnings
1	Berry van Peer	£13,275
2	Owen Bates	£9,700
3	John Henderson	£9,525
4	Andy Boulton	£8,850
5	Cam Crabtree	£8,850
6	Christian Kist (Note: Qualified for 2024 PDC World Darts Championship via another method.)	£7,625
7	Dom Taylor	£6,200
8	James Hurrell	£6,200
9	Dragutin Horvat	£6,075
10	Thibault Tricole	£5,875

No.	Date	Venue	Winner	Legs	Runner-up	Ref.
1	Friday 20 January	Arena MK, (England) Milton Keynes	Chris Landman (92.52)	5 – 2	Lukas Wenig (85.04)	
2	Friday 20 January	Arena MK, (England) Milton Keynes	Christian Kist (92.18)	5 – 2	Scott Mitchell (87.24)	
3	Saturday 21 January	Arena MK, (England) Milton Keynes	Andy Boulton (86.19)	5 – 3	Martijn Dragt (88.86)	
4	Saturday 21 January	Arena MK, (England) Milton Keynes	Cam Crabtree (94.65)	5 – 4	Owen Bates (103.22)	
5	Sunday 22 January	Arena MK, (England) Milton Keynes	Thibault Tricole (93.87)	5 – 2	Owen Bates (89.28)	
6	Friday 17 March	Halle 39, (Germany) Hildesheim	Berry van Peer (94.51)	5 – 2	Peter Jacques (94.56)	
7	Friday 17 March	Halle 39, (Germany) Hildesheim	John Henderson (87.96)	5 – 3	Ron Meulenkamp (89.18)	
8	Saturday 18 March	Halle 39, (Germany) Hildesheim	Ron Meulenkamp (98.88)	5 – 0	Alexander Merkx (84.80)	
9	Saturday 18 March	Halle 39, (Germany) Hildesheim	Dragutin Horvat (78.28)	5 – 0	Christian Kist (76.37)	
10	Friday 5 May	Arena MK, (England) Milton Keynes	Berry van Peer (88.29)	5 – 2	Dragutin Horvat (84.63)	
11	Friday 5 May	Arena MK, (England) Milton Keynes	Wayne Jones (90.92)	5 – 2	Daniel Ayres (83.57)	
12	Saturday 6 May	Arena MK, (England) Milton Keynes	Berry van Peer (90.26)	5 – 3	Harry Ward (88.32)	
13	Saturday 6 May	Arena MK, (England) Milton Keynes	Berry van Peer (87.77)	5 – 3	Scott Mitchell (82.70)	
14	Sunday 7 May	Arena MK, (England) Milton Keynes	Conan Whitehead (97.60)	5 – 2	William Borland (84.76)	
15	Friday 11 August	Arena MK, (England) Milton Keynes	Wesley Plaisier (96.42)	5 – 2	Scott Mitchell (91.67)	
16	Friday 11 August	Arena MK, (England) Milton Keynes	Darryl Pilgrim (95.64)	5 – 1	Andy Boulton (88.40)	
17	Saturday 12 August	Arena MK, (England) Milton Keynes	Robert Grundy (85.08)	5 – 2	Christian Kist (84.44)	
18	Saturday 12 August	Arena MK, (England) Milton Keynes	Cam Crabtree (86.64)	5 – 2	Stefan Bellmont (85.90)	
19	Sunday 13 August	Arena MK, (England) Milton Keynes	Owen Bates (93.52)	5 – 4	Wesley Plaisier (87.98)	
20	Saturday 28 October	Robin Park Tennis Centre, (England) Wigan	John Henderson (93.55)	5 – 3	Lukas Wenig (86.80)	
21	Saturday 28 October	Robin Park Tennis Centre, (England) Wigan	Dom Taylor (94.50)	5 – 2	Cam Crabtree (87.53)	
22	Sunday 29 October	Robin Park Tennis Centre, (England) Wigan	Vítězslav Sedlák (86.51)	5 – 2	John Henderson (89.51)	
23	Sunday 29 October	Robin Park Tennis Centre, (England) Wigan	Andy Boulton (93.00)	5 – 4	Owen Bates (89.07)	
24	Monday 30 October	Robin Park Tennis Centre, (England) Wigan	James Hurrell (90.03)	5 – 2	Owen Bates (78.35)	

== PDC Development Tour ==
The Development Tour once again consisted of 4 weekends of 5 events, and 1 weekend of 4 events. The top 2 players on the Order of Merit received a PDC Tour Card and a place at the 2024 PDC World Darts Championship, meanwhile the winner of the Order of Merit received a spot at the 2023 Grand Slam of Darts as well. The Development Tour rankings additionally formed a large part of qualification for the 2023 PDC World Youth Championship. Furthermore, the top 8 ranked players from the 2023 Development Tour Order of Merit, who did not manage to earn a Tour Card for the 2024 season, qualified for the first round of the 2024 UK Open.

2023 Development Tour ranking
Rank	Player	Earnings
1	Gian van Veen (Note: Qualified for 2024 PDC World Darts Championship via another method.) (Note: Qualified for 2024 Tour Card via another method.)	£20,950
2	Luke Littler	£20,175
3	Wessel Nijman	£14,825
4	Nathan Rafferty	£10,125
5	Sebastian Białecki	£9,025
6	Dylan Slevin	£8,725
7	Rusty-Jake Rodriguez	£8,000
8	Bradley Brooks	£7,475
9	Cam Crabtree	£7,175
10	Jurjen van der Velde	£7,125

No.	Date	Venue	Winner	Legs	Runner-up	Ref.
1	Friday 31 March	Arena MK, (England) Milton Keynes	Christopher Toonders (90.65)	5 – 2	Marvin Kraft (82.22)	
2	Friday 31 March	Arena MK, (England) Milton Keynes	Dylan Slevin (97.34)	5 – 4	Luke Littler (93.64)	
3	Saturday 1 April	Arena MK, (England) Milton Keynes	Luke Littler (91.41)	5 – 1	Jurjen van der Velde (72.18)	
4	Saturday 1 April	Arena MK, (England) Milton Keynes	Gian van Veen (80.50)	5 – 2	Adam Paxton (74.85)	
5	Sunday 2 April	Arena MK, (England) Milton Keynes	Luke Littler (92.55)	5 – 3	Kevin Troppmann (80.93)	
6	Friday 28 April	Robin Park Tennis Centre, (England) Wigan	Wessel Nijman (96.87)	5 – 3	Nathan Girvan (90.43)	
7	Friday 28 April	Robin Park Tennis Centre, (England) Wigan	Sebastian Białecki (85.32)	5 – 4	Leighton Bennett (82.78)	
8	Saturday 29 April	Robin Park Tennis Centre, (England) Wigan	Gian van Veen (97.17)	5 – 2	Thomas Banks (95.37)	
9	Saturday 29 April	Robin Park Tennis Centre, (England) Wigan	Ciarán Teehan (89.44)	5 – 4	Jurjen van der Velde (90.50)	
10	Sunday 30 April	Robin Park Tennis Centre, (England) Wigan	Gian van Veen (87.27)	5 – 1	Bradly Roes (81.91)	
11	Friday 9 June	Halle 39, (Germany) Hildesheim	Bradley Brooks (101.38)	5 – 3	Owen Roelofs (98.24)	
12	Friday 9 June	Halle 39, (Germany) Hildesheim	Wessel Nijman (100.34)	5 – 1	Dylan Slevin (95.38)	
13	Saturday 10 June	Halle 39, (Germany) Hildesheim	Gian van Veen (96.05)	5 – 4	Wessel Nijman (98.48)	
14	Saturday 10 June	Halle 39, (Germany) Hildesheim	Jarred Cole (90.09)	5 – 1	Rusty-Jake Rodriguez (80.94)	
15	Sunday 11 June	Halle 39, (Germany) Hildesheim	Adam Gawlas (87.84)	5 – 4	Dylan Slevin (91.49)	
16	Friday 14 July	Leicester Arena, (England) Leicester	Luke Littler (90.03)	5 – 2	Bradly Roes (88.25)	
17	Friday 14 July	Leicester Arena, (England) Leicester	Gian van Veen (93.94)	5 – 0	Reece Colley (74.58)	
18	Saturday 15 July	Leicester Arena, (England) Leicester	Nathan Rafferty (92.44)	5 – 3	Cam Crabtree (93.13)	
19	Saturday 15 July	Leicester Arena, (England) Leicester	Wessel Nijman (96.23)	5 – 3	Gian van Veen (93.28)	
20	Sunday 16 July	Leicester Arena, (England) Leicester	Luke Littler (89.87)	5 – 4	Gian van Veen (89.36)	
21	Friday 18 August	Arena MK, (England) Milton Keynes	Rusty-Jake Rodriguez (84.35)	5 – 3	Dominik Grüllich (81.20)	
22	Friday 18 August	Arena MK, (England) Milton Keynes	Sebastian Białecki (96.62)	5 – 3	Keane Barry (96.08)	
23	Saturday 19 August	Arena MK, (England) Milton Keynes	Gian van Veen (94.61)	5 – 4	Luke Littler (95.68)	
24	Saturday 19 August	Arena MK, (England) Milton Keynes	Luke Littler (91.97)	5 – 1	Cam Crabtree (83.31)	

=== World Youth Championship ===
The preliminary rounds of the 2023 World Youth Championship were held on 20 August 2023 at Arena MK, Milton Keynes; while the final was held on 26 November 2023 at Butlin's Minehead as part of the 2023 Players Championship Finals. The winner qualified for the 2024 PDC World Darts Championship.

Josh Rock, who was not eligible to play on the Development Tour due to being in the top 32 on the PDC Order of Merit, was reigning champion and top seed going into the tournament. However he was defeated by Gian van Veen in the quarter-finals 6–5.

The top 2 from the 2023 PDC Development Tour series met in the final, with Luke Littler defeating Gian van Veen 6–4.

The results from the third round onwards are shown below.

Third round (best of 11 legs); 20 August
1	Josh Rock 91.06	6
Jarno Bottenberg 90.98	4
8	Gian van Veen 95.78	6
9	Dylan Slevin 88.99	3
Moreno Blom 79.89	4
13	Owen Bates 91.08	6
5	Nathan Rafferty 98.85	0
21	Wessel Nijman 106.09	6
2	Keane Barry 85.35	3
15	Luke Littler 92.94	6
Jacob Gwynne 84.61	6
10	Jurjen van der Velde 82.75	3
Viktor Tingström 83.36	3
19	Jitse van der Wal 84.50	6
6	Bradley Brooks 74.79	1
22	Sebastian Białecki 91.63	6

Quarter-finals (best of 11 legs); 20 August
1	Josh Rock 88.90	5
8	Gian van Veen 90.66	6
13	Owen Bates 82.32	2
21	Wessel Nijman 102.95	6
15	Luke Littler 90.76	6
Jacob Gwynne 93.02	3
19	Jitse van der Wal 86.39	5
22	Sebastian Białecki 87.46	6

Semi-finals (best of 11 legs); 20 August
8	Gian van Veen 103.20	6
21	Wessel Nijman 102.08	5
15	Luke Littler 101.86	6
22	Sebastian Białecki 98.78	3

Final (best of 11 legs); 26 November
8	Gian van Veen 97.48	4
15	Luke Littler 102.16	6

== PDC Women's Series ==
The 2023 PDC Women's Series was expanded from 20 to 24 events held over six weekends. The top 8 ranked players earned from the last 8 Women's Series events of 2022 and the first 12 events of 2023 qualified for the 2023 Women's World Matchplay in Blackpool. The top two players from the series qualified for the 2024 PDC World Darts Championship, while the top non-qualified player qualified for the 2023 Grand Slam of Darts.

Final standings of the 2023 Women's World Matchplay Race(Cut-off: June 26, 2023)
Rank	Player	Earnings
1	Beau Greaves	£24,300
2	Mikuru Suzuki	£12,100
3	Fallon Sherrock	£7,750
4	Robyn Byrne	£6,150
5	Rhian O'Sullivan	£5,400
6	Lisa Ashton	£5,200
7	Aileen de Graaf	£4,400
8	Noa-Lynn van Leuven	£3,750
9	Lorraine Winstanley	£3,150
10	Priscilla Steenbergen	£2,700

2023 Women's Series ranking
Rank	Player	Earnings
1	Beau Greaves (Note: Qualified for 2023 Grand Slam of Darts via another method.) (Note: Decided to play at 2023 WDF World Darts Championship after PDC didn't permit to play at two World Championships in one year.)	£29,400
2	Fallon Sherrock	£17,200
3	Mikuru Suzuki	£13,600
4	Rhian O'Sullivan	£9,100
5	Lisa Ashton	£8,950
6	Robyn Byrne	£6,900
7	Aileen de Graaf	£5,400
8	Noa-Lynn van Leuven	£5,300
9	Natalie Gilbert	£4,700
10	Anastasia Dobromyslova (Note: Anastasia Dobromyslova has competed under a neutral designation since the 2022 Russian invasion of Ukraine.)	£4,300

No.	Date	Venue	Winner	Legs	Runner-up	Ref.
1	Saturday 25 February	Leicester Arena, (England) Leicester	Beau Greaves (94.34)	5 – 3	Mikuru Suzuki (86.82)	
2	Saturday 25 February	Leicester Arena, (England) Leicester	Beau Greaves (81.68)	5 – 0	Kim Holden (65.72)	
3	Sunday 26 February	Leicester Arena, (England) Leicester	Mikuru Suzuki (84.62)	5 – 1	Rhian O'Sullivan (79.43)	
4	Sunday 26 February	Leicester Arena, (England) Leicester	Beau Greaves (89.46)	5 – 0	Robyn Byrne (74.38)	
5	Saturday 13 May	Arena MK, (England) Milton Keynes	Beau Greaves (94.75)	5 – 2	Fallon Sherrock (93.48)	
6	Saturday 13 May	Arena MK, (England) Milton Keynes	Rhian O'Sullivan (84.53)	5 – 3	Beau Greaves (80.21)	
7	Sunday 14 May	Arena MK, (England) Milton Keynes	Robyn Byrne (78.88)	5 – 1	Laura Turner (69.44)	
8	Sunday 14 May	Arena MK, (England) Milton Keynes	Mikuru Suzuki (78.10)	5 – 3	Noa-Lynn van Leuven (76.45)	
9	Saturday 24 June	Halle 39, (Germany) Hildesheim	Beau Greaves (95.94)	5 – 1	Mikuru Suzuki (84.47)	
10	Saturday 24 June	Halle 39, (Germany) Hildesheim	Fallon Sherrock (88.95)	5 – 2	Robyn Byrne 81.82	
11	Sunday 25 June	Halle 39, (Germany) Hildesheim	Beau Greaves (89.05)	5 – 4	Fallon Sherrock (90.92)	
12	Sunday 25 June	Halle 39, (Germany) Hildesheim	Beau Greaves (104.38)	5 – 0	Noa-Lynn van Leuven (81.77)	
13	Saturday 29 July	Arena MK, (England) Milton Keynes	Beau Greaves (93.31)	5 – 2	Lisa Ashton (90.76)	
14	Saturday 29 July	Arena MK, (England) Milton Keynes	Beau Greaves (104.96)	5 – 1	Fallon Sherrock (83.89)	
15	Sunday 30 July	Arena MK, (England) Milton Keynes	Beau Greaves (91.65)	5 – 0	Mikuru Suzuki (74.77)	
16	Sunday 30 July	Arena MK, (England) Milton Keynes	Beau Greaves (85.02)	5 – 4	Mikuru Suzuki (77.51)	
17	Saturday 16 September	Robin Park Tennis Centre, (England) Wigan	Mikuru Suzuki (81.93)	5 – 1	Lisa Ashton (72.73)	
18	Saturday 16 September	Robin Park Tennis Centre, (England) Wigan	Lisa Ashton (93.94)	5 – 0	Anastasia Dobromyslova (68.46)	
19	Sunday 17 September	Robin Park Tennis Centre, (England) Wigan	Beau Greaves (94.01)	5 – 2	Anastasia Dobromyslova (80.66)	
20	Sunday 17 September	Robin Park Tennis Centre, (England) Wigan	Fallon Sherrock (84.78)	5 – 4	Beau Greaves (92.67)	
21	Saturday 14 October	Robin Park Tennis Centre, (England) Wigan	Fallon Sherrock (95.13)	5 – 0	Vicky Pruim (80.40)	
22	Saturday 14 October	Robin Park Tennis Centre, (England) Wigan	Fallon Sherrock (82.58)	5 – 0	Aoife McCormack (79.11)	
23	Sunday 15 October	Robin Park Tennis Centre, (England) Wigan	Fallon Sherrock (88.30)	5 – 3	Rhian O'Sullivan (82.85)	
24	Sunday 15 October	Robin Park Tennis Centre, (England) Wigan	Natalie Gilbert (74.61)	5 – 3	Lorraine Winstanley (71.63)	

== PDC Asian Tour ==
Following a break of three years, the PDC Asian Tour returned in 2023 with an expanded tour consisting of 24 events held over 8 weekends. The first 15 events were confirmed on 10 November 2022, with the remaining 9 confirmed at a later date. The top four players from the final 2023 PDC Asian Tour Order of Merit qualified for the 2024 PDC World Darts Championship.

The Asian Championship also returned, this time taking place in Shimonoseki between 5–8 October. The PDC Asian Championship winner and runner-up will also qualify, and if either or both players have already qualified from the PDC Asian Tour Order of Merit then the place(s) would be passed to the next-best-placed non-qualified player from the PDC Asian Championship (split by PDC Asian Tour OOM if required using standard PDC countback rules). In addition, the best-placed non-qualified Japanese player from the PDC Asian Championship (if no Japanese player reaches the final) will also qualify for the World Championship, with any ties to be split by PDC Asian Tour OOM if required using standard PDC countback rules. If one or both of the PDC Asian Championship finalists are Japanese, this place will pass to the PDC Asian Tour Order of Merit.

The last two places were occupied by the PDC China Premier League qualifiers, which were held between June and August, with a final playoff at the end, and an Indian Qualifier from an event taking place on 28 October 2023.

2023 Asian Tour ranking
Rank	Player	Earnings
1	Lourence Ilagan	$11,000
2	Tomoya Goto	$9,150
3	Paolo Nebrida	$9,100
4	Reynaldo Rivera	$8,700
5	Man Lok Leung (Note: As the winner of the Asian Championship was Japanese, an additional place was made for the PDC Asian Tour Order of Merit.)	$8,700
6	Lok Yin Lee	$7,800
7	Jun Matsuda	$7,300
8	Paul Lim	$6,650
9	Rosendo Lubaton	$6,050
10	Nitin Kumar	$5,900

No.	Date	Venue	Winner	Legs	Runner-up	Ref.
1	Saturday 11 March	Kobe International Exhibition Centre, (Japan) Kobe	Man Lok Leung (94.91)	5 – 3	Lourence Ilagan (89.29)	
2	Saturday 11 March	Kobe International Exhibition Centre, (Japan) Kobe	Lourence Ilagan (97.70)	5 – 2	Motomu Sakai (90.96)	
3	Sunday 12 March	Kobe International Exhibition Centre, (Japan) Kobe	Haruki Muramatsu (82.38)	5 – 4	Lourence Ilagan (88.91)	
4	Saturday 25 March	KINTEX 1 Hall Grand Ballroom, (South Korea) Seoul	Lok Yin Lee (90.51)	5 – 2	Keita Ono (77.43)	
5	Saturday 25 March	KINTEX 1 Hall Grand Ballroom, (South Korea) Seoul	Jun Matsuda (84.38)	5 – 3	Tomoya Goto (81.11)	
6	Sunday 26 March	KINTEX 1 Hall Grand Ballroom, (South Korea) Seoul	Man Lok Leung (87.27)	5 – 2	Tomoya Goto (87.62)	
7	Saturday 15 April	Leyte Academic Center, (Philippines) Palo	Rosendo Lubaton (104.59)	5 – 2	Lourence Ilagan (89.40)	
8	Saturday 15 April	Leyte Academic Center, (Philippines) Palo	Ryan Condat (96.77)	5 – 2	Nitin Kumar (86.02)	
9	Sunday 16 April	Leyte Academic Center, (Philippines) Palo	Reynaldo Rivera (110.51)	5 – 0	Lourence Ilagan (93.71)	
10	Saturday 29 April	Riverside Regal Hotel, Hong Kong	Christian Perez (95.71)	5 – 1	Nitin Kumar (85.68)	
11	Saturday 29 April	Riverside Regal Hotel, Hong Kong	Lourence Ilagan (88.14)	5 – 1	Reynaldo Rivera (83.84)	
12	Sunday 30 April	Riverside Regal Hotel, Hong Kong	Paolo Nebrida (88.96)	5 – 4	Reynaldo Rivera (94.57)	
13	Saturday 27 May	Triple Event Hall, (Mongolia) Ulaanbaatar	Zong Xiao Chen (92.73)	5 – 2	Altantulkhuur Myagmarsuren (75.83)	
14	Saturday 27 May	Triple Event Hall, (Mongolia) Ulaanbaatar	Nitin Kumar (88.20)	5 – 4	Paul Lim (81.47)	
15	Sunday 28 May	Triple Event Hall, (Mongolia) Ulaanbaatar	Zong Xiao Chen (83.03)	5 – 1	Jun Matsuda (74.47)	
16	Saturday 1 July	Forest3 Cafe, Singapore	Mohd Nasir Bin Jantan (89.49)	5 – 3	Paolo Nebrida (86.07)	
17	Sunday 2 July	Forest3 Cafe, Singapore	Tomoya Goto (88.99)	5 – 3	Alexis Toylo (89.02)	
18	Sunday 2 July	Forest3 Cafe, Singapore	Mohd Nasir Bin Jantan (94.00)	5 – 2	Paolo Nebrida (93.75)	
19	Saturday 29 July	Tide Resort, (Thailand) Bang Saen	Mitsuhiko Tatsunami (88.76)	5 – 2	Paolo Nebrida (78.85)	
20	Saturday 29 July	Tide Resort, (Thailand) Bang Saen	Man Lok Leung (93.44)	5 – 3	Paolo Nebrida (90.62)	
21	Sunday 30 July	Tide Resort, (Thailand) Bang Saen	Paul Lim (91.74)	5 – 1	Paolo Nebrida (85.70)	
22	Saturday 9 September	Hampton by Hilton, (China) Qingdao	Lok Yin Lee (84.20)	5 – 4	Rosendo Lubaton (84.57)	
23	Saturday 9 September	Hampton by Hilton, (China) Qingdao	Reynaldo Rivera (93.16)	5 – 2	Alexis Toylo (78.96)	
24	Sunday 10 September	Hampton by Hilton, (China) Qingdao	Tomoya Goto (100.21)	5 – 1	Paolo Nebrida (87.78)	

Due to a tie, the fourth advancing place had to be decided by a decisive match:

Date	Winner	Legs	Runner-up	Ref.
Sunday 10 September	Reynaldo Rivera (88.71)	5 – 4	Man Lok Leung (86.59)	

=== PDC Asian Championship ===
The Asian Championship was held in Shimonoseki. The top 16 players from the PDC Asian Tour Order of Merit qualified, as did the winners of sixteen national qualifiers and qualifiers from events held prior to the Championship, up to a count of 48 players. The finalists qualified for the 2024 PDC World Darts Championship; while the winner qualified for the 2023 Grand Slam of Darts.

The results from the second round onwards are shown below.

Second round (best of 9 legs); 7 October
1	Lourence Ilagan 85.71	4
Motomu Sakai 92.59	5
8	Paul Lim 82.66	5
9	Rosendo Lubaton 81.58	4
Alex Tagarao 91.93	2
13	Haruki Muramatsu 101.76	5
Raymond Copano 79.99	5
12	Mohd Nasir Bin Jantan 76.19	4
2	Tomoya Goto 79.89	4
15	Sonny Balagat 77.93	5
Sandro Eric Sosing 89.37	5
Jemel Modesto 81.68	1
Ryusei Azemoto 89.40	5
14	Tatsunami Mitsuhiko 85.38	3
6	Lok Yin Lee 79.20	2
11	Christian Perez 80.07	5

Quarter-finals (best of 11 legs); 8 October
Motomu Sakai 85.08	6
8	Paul Lim 72.48	0
13	Haruki Muramatsu 92.60	6
Raymond Copano 88.91	1
15	Sonny Balagat 81.03	1
Sandro Eric Sosing 94.05	6
Ryusei Azemoto 87.55	6
11	Christian Perez 88.40	4

Semi-finals (best of 11 legs); 8 October
Motomu Sakai 82.02	1
13	Haruki Muramatsu 87.38	6
Sandro Eric Sosing 86.21	6
Ryusei Azemoto 85.03	3

Final (best of 13 legs); 8 October
13	Haruki Muramatsu 91.08	7
Sandro Eric Sosing 81.53	6

=== PDC China Premier League ===
2023 China Premier League ranking
Rank	Player	Points
1	Xiaochen Zong	28
2	Lihao Wen	18
3	Xicheng Han	14
4	Bin Zheng	10
5	(China) Chengan Liu	8
6	Zhou Bu	2
6	Hailong Chen	2
6	Zhiwei Lin	2

2023 China Premier League
Night	Date	Winner	Legs	Runner-up	Ref.
1	Tuesday 6 Jun	Xiaochen Zong (87.78)	5 – 1	Xicheng Han (79.92)	
2	Tuesday 11 July	Xicheng Han (96.35)	5 – 0	Lihao Wen (79.81)	
3	Tuesday 25 July	Xiaochen Zong (91.79)	5 – 3	Lihao Wen (79.03)	
4	Tuesday 15 Aug	Lihao Wen (85.12)	5 – 4	Zong Xiao Chen (81.06)	
5	Saturday 26 Aug	Xiaochen Zong (79.77)	5 – 1	Chengan Liu (78.70)	
6	Saturday 26 Aug	Xiaochen Zong (95.81)	5 – 1	Chengan Liu (85.42)	
7	Saturday 27 Aug	Xiaochen Zong (84.06)	5 – 3	Lihao Wen (82.11)	

The 2023 China Premier League playoff was held on August 27. The winner qualified for the 2024 PDC World Darts Championship.

Semi-finals (best of 19 legs); 27 Aug
1	Xiaochen Zong (87.64)	10
4	Bin Zheng (81.33)	3
2	Lihao Wen (85.88)	6
3	Xicheng Han (90.30)	10

Final (best of 21 legs); 27 Aug
1	Xiaochen Zong (90.62)	11
3	Xicheng Han (80.72)	10

=== PDC India Qualifier 2023 ===
The PDC India Qualifier was held on 28 October, the winner qualified for the 2024 PDC World Darts Championship. The results from the quarter-final onwards are shown.

Quarter-finals (best of 7 legs); 28 Oct
Aal Nakeeran 73.05	4
Nitin Kumar 74.39	2
Amit Gilitwala 71.40	1
Prakash Jiwa 93.94	4
Bhav Patel 69.76	4
Akshay Mehta 67.46	1
Phalgun Tiruvasu 57.12	4
Vikehelie Suohu 54.52	2

Semi-finals (best of 9 legs); 28 Oct
Aal Nakeeran 81.68	1
Prakash Jiwa 78.28	5
Bhav Patel 77.47	5
Phalgun Tiruvasu 57.77	0

Final (best of 11 legs); 28 Oct
Prakash Jiwa 90.97 (Note: The original qualifier Prakash Jiwa was suspended by the Darts Regulation Authority on 16 November 2023 while an investigation is conducted into suspicious betting in the independent Modus Super Series. Jiwa was replaced by the runner-up of the Indian Qualifier on 25 November 2023.)	6
Bhav Patel 71.50	1

== Professional Darts Corporation Nordic & Baltic (PDCNB) Tour ==
On 15 January 2023, PDC Nordic & Baltic announced their 2023 calendar, which had 5 weekends in 5 different countries. The top 2 players on the Order of Merit received a place at the 2024 PDC World Darts Championship.

2023 PDCNB Tour ranking
Rank	Player	Earnings
1	Marko Kantele	€6,050
2	Jeffrey de Graaf	€4,225
3	Benjamin Drue Reus	€3,200
4	Daniel Larsson	€3,150
5	Dennis Nilsson	€2,125
6	Paavo Myller	€1,975
7	Vladimir Andersen	€1,825
8	Mindaugas Barauskas	€1,700
9	Tom Veje	€1,400
10	Oskar Lukasiak	€1,300

No.	Date	Venue	Winner	Legs	Runner-up	Ref.
1	Saturday 18 February	Slangerup Dart Club, (Denmark) Slangerup	Marko Kantele (93.33)	6 – 1	Jeffrey de Graaf (85.37)	
2	Sunday 19 February	Slangerup Dart Club, (Denmark) Slangerup	Mindaugas Barauskas (79.07)	6 – 5	Tom Veje (72.26)	
3	Saturday 11 March	Apple Hotel, (Sweden) Gothenburg	Marko Kantele (88.12)	6 – 4	Hannu Suominen (86.06)	
4	Sunday 12 March	Apple Hotel, (Sweden) Gothenburg	Daniel Larsson (84.48)	6 – 1	Benjamin Drue Reus (77.71)	
5	Saturday 15 April	Bullseye, (Iceland) Reykjavík	Vladimir Andersen (90.96)	6 – 4	Daniel Larsson (91.22)	
6	Sunday 16 April	Bullseye, (Iceland) Reykjavík	Marko Kantele (89.50)	6 – 1	Jeffrey de Graaf (83.33)	
7	Saturday 3 June	Hotelli Tallukka, (Finland) Vääksy	Marko Kantele (86.33)	6 – 5	Dennis Nilsson (88.45)	
8	Sunday 4 June	Hotelli Tallukka, (Finland) Vääksy	Jeffrey de Graaf (83.76)	6 – 1	Paavo Myller (76.13)	
9	Saturday 15 July	Bellevue Park Hotel, (Latvia) Riga	Jeffrey de Graaf (93.98)	6 – 5	Dennis Nilsson (92.17)	
10	Sunday 16 July	Bellevue Park Hotel, (Latvia) Riga	Benjamin Drue Reus (83.73)	6 – 3	Valters Melderis (75.31)	

== Dartplayers Australia (DPA) Pro Tour ==
The Dartplayers Australia Tour returned to a unified tour for 2023. Dates announced by Dartsplayer Australia. The winner after twenty tournaments received a place at the 2024 PDC World Darts Championship.

2023 DPA Pro Tour ranking
Rank	Player	Earnings
1	Darren Penhall	$9,890
2	Brandon Weening	$3,440
3	Mal Cuming	$3,360
4	Joe Comito	$3,300
5	Harley Kemp	$2,030
6	Brenton Lloyd	$1,970
7	Jeremy Fagg	$1,550
8	Gordon Mathers	$1,510
9	Mitchell Clegg	$1,200
10	Bailey Marsh	$1,080
10	David Platt	$1,080

No.	Date	Venue	Winner	Legs	Runner-up	Ref.
1	Saturday 18 February	Warilla Bowls Club, (Australia) Barrack Heights	(86.84) Jeremy Fagg	5 – 2	Gordon Mathers (83.87)	
2	Saturday 18 February	Warilla Bowls Club, (Australia) Barrack Heights	(86.49) Brandon Weening	5 – 3	Bill Aitken (82.30)	
3	Sunday 19 February	Warilla Bowls Club, (Australia) Barrack Heights	(86.72) Mal Cuming	5 – 4	Gordon Mathers (85.84)	
4	Sunday 19 February	Warilla Bowls Club, (Australia) Barrack Heights	(85.14) Darren Penhall	5 – 2	Brandon Weening (74.57)	
5	Saturday 18 March	Warilla Bowls Club, (Australia) Barrack Heights	(77.88) Harley Kemp	5 – 2	Brenton Lloyd (77.39)	
6	Saturday 18 March	Warilla Bowls Club, (Australia) Barrack Heights	(87.32) Darren Penhall	5 – 3	Joe Comito (82.89)	
7	Sunday 19 March	Warilla Bowls Club, (Australia) Barrack Heights	(95.98) Joe Comito	5 – 4	Darren Penhall (91.02)	
8	Sunday 19 March	Warilla Bowls Club, (Australia) Barrack Heights	(96.54) Darren Penhall	5 – 2	Mitchell Clegg (75.36)	
9	Friday 28 April	Geelong Greyhound Club, (Australia) Geelong	(88.00) Mal Cuming	5 – 1	Brody Klinge (82.17)	
10	Saturday 29 April	Geelong Greyhound Club, (Australia) Geelong	(100.27) Darren Penhall	5 – 3	Brandon Weening (95.41)	
11	Saturday 29 April	Geelong Greyhound Club, (Australia) Geelong	(92.91) Darren Penhall	5 – 4	Mal Cuming (86.98)	
12	Sunday 30 April	Geelong Greyhound Club, (Australia) Geelong	(88.02) Mal Cuming	5 – 1	Joe Comito (78.86)	
13	Sunday 30 April	Geelong Greyhound Club, (Australia) Geelong	(91.53) Darren Penhall	5 – 2	Mal Cuming (91.83)	
14	Saturday 27 May	Warilla Bowls Club, (Australia) Barrack Heights	(90.66) Darren Penhall	5 – 3	Joe Comito (91.20)	
15	Saturday 27 May	Warilla Bowls Club, (Australia) Barrack Heights	(85.28) Darren Penhall	5 – 4	Joe Comito (82.42)	
16	Sunday 28 May	Warilla Bowls Club, (Australia) Barrack Heights	(81.41) Bailey Marsh	5 – 4	Darren Penhall (83.30)	
17	Sunday 28 May	Warilla Bowls Club, (Australia) Barrack Heights	(83.60) David Platt	5 – 4	Brenton Lloyd (78.51)	
18	Saturday 8 July	Warilla Bowls Club, (Australia) Barrack Heights	(85.89) Darren Penhall	5 – 3	Brandon Weening (84.36)	
19	Saturday 8 July	Warilla Bowls Club, (Australia) Barrack Heights	(96.29) Darren Penhall	5 – 2	Brandon Weening (86.29)	
20	Saturday 9 July	Warilla Bowls Club, (Australia) Barrack Heights	(87.62) Darren Penhall	5 – 4	Brandon Weening (83.66)	
21	Saturday 9 July	Warilla Bowls Club, (Australia) Barrack Heights	(89.21) Jeremy Fagg	5 – 4	Darren Penhall (89.73)	

== Dartplayers New Zealand (DPNZ) Pro Tour ==
The Dartplayers New Zealand Tour returned for an extended tour for 2023. There were 12 events held over 6 weekends.

2023 DPNZ Open Rankings
Rank	Player	Points
1	Ben Robb	168
2	Haupai Puha	144
3	Kayden Milne	124
4	Warren Parry	120
5	Mark Cleaver	88
6	Tukina Weko	72
7	John Hurring	72
8	Darren Dummigan	48

No.	Date	Venue	Winner	Legs	Runner-up	Ref.
1	Saturday 25 February	Black Horse Hotel, (New Zealand) Christchurch	(86.12) Ben Robb	7 – 3	Warren Parry (79.35)	
2	Sunday 26 February	Black Horse Hotel, (New Zealand) Christchurch	(94.62) Ben Robb	7 – 4	Haupai Puha (86.69)	
3	Saturday 25 March	Birkenhead RSA, (New Zealand) Auckland	(94.76) John Hurring	7 – 6	Ben Robb (92.73)	
4	Sunday 26 March	Birkenhead RSA, (New Zealand) Auckland	(90.12) Haupai Puha	7 – 4	Tukina Weko (79.59)	
5	Saturday 29 April	Sun City, (New Zealand) Nelson	(90.62) Ben Robb	7 – 5	Kayden Milne (78.22)	
6	Sunday 30 April	Sun City, (New Zealand) Nelson	(83.39) Ben Robb	7 – 3	Haupai Puha (74.95)	
7	Saturday 13 May	Hamilton Cossie Club, (New Zealand) Hamilton	(82.47) Kayden Milne	7 – 3	Warren Parry (77.48)	
8	Sunday 14 May	Hamilton Cossie Club, (New Zealand) Hamilton	(86.36) Ben Robb	7 – 5	Haupai Puha (81.70)	
9	Saturday 2 September	Dunedin Metropolitan Club, (New Zealand) Dunedin	(88.10) Ben Robb	7 – 1	Kayden Milne (86.64)	
10	Sunday 3 September	Dunedin Metropolitan Club, (New Zealand) Dunedin	(85.02) Darren Dummigan	7 – 5	Tukina Weko (80.33)	
11	Saturday 7 October	Black Horse Hotel, (New Zealand) Christchurch	(100.20) Haupai Puha	7 – 0	Jonny Tata (78.66)	
12	Sunday 8 October	Black Horse Hotel, (New Zealand) Christchurch	(86.52) Warren Parry	7 – 6	Mark Cleaver (90.10)	

Following the culmination of the 2023 DPNZ ProTour season, the top 16 players on the DPNZ Order of Merit competed in the 2024 PDC World Darts Championship qualifier on 9 October in Christchurch. The results from the semi-final onwards are shown.

Semi-finals (best of 13 legs); 09 Oct
Ben Robb (88.85)	7
Kayden Milne (82.84)	4
Darren Herewini (82.49)	0
Haupai Puha (93.11)	7

Final (best of 15 legs); 09 Oct
Ben Robb (94.62)	8
Haupai Puha (90.17)	4

=== DPA Winmau Oceanic Masters 2023 ===
The 2023 Oceanic Masters was held on October 22, the winner qualified for the 2024 PDC World Darts Championship. The results from the quarter-final onwards are shown.

Quarter-finals (best of 2 sets); 22 Oct
1	Mal Cuming 83.79	2
8	Stu Irwin 77.17	0
4	Mark Cleaver 74.93	1
12	Hipirini Tewhakaara 74.96	2
2	Haupai Puha 88.44	2
7	Joe Comito 82.47	1
3	Jeremy Fagg 101.02	2
11	Gordon Mathers 94.15	0

Semi-finals (best of 3 sets); 22 Oct
1	Mal Cuming 87.50	3
12	Hipirini Tewhakaara 74.71	2
2	Haupai Puha 87.78	3
3	Jeremy Fagg 84.74	1

Final (best of 3 sets); 22 Oct
1	Mal Cuming 89.67	1
2	Haupai Puha 94.72	3

== Championship Darts Corporation (CDC) Pro Tour ==
The Championship Darts Corporation continued in 2023. It hosted 12 events held over 4 weekends. The top players from the United States and Canada on the Tour Points qualified for the 2024 PDC World Darts Championship.

2023 CDC Pro Tour Rankings
Rank	Player	Points
1	Alex Spellman	116
2	Stowe Buntz	102
3	Leonard Gates	96
4	David Cameron	94
5	Jacob Taylor	84
6	Danny Lauby	82
7	Jim Long	70
8	Doug Boehm	48
9	(United States) Jason Brandon	48
10	Larry Butler	45

No.	Date	Venue	Winner	Legs	Runner-up	Ref.
1	Saturday 20 May	American Legion Post 331, (United States) Brownsburg	Jake Womack (88.72)	7 – 2	Stowe Buntz (78.41)	
2	Saturday 20 May	American Legion Post 331, (United States) Brownsburg	Alex Spellman (95.78)	7 – 5	Jason Brandon (89.03)	
3	Sunday 21 May	American Legion Post 331, (United States) Brownsburg	Leonard Gates (97.62)	7 – 1	J.T. Davis (88.61)	
4	Saturday 15 July	Ramada Plaza Hotel North Shore, (United States) Wheeling	Jules van Dongen (96.53)	7 – 4	Danny Lauby (97.29)	
5	Saturday 15 July	Ramada Plaza Hotel North Shore, (United States) Wheeling	Alex Spellman (99.84)	7 – 4	David Cameron (87.91)	
6	Sunday 16 July	Ramada Plaza Hotel North Shore, (United States) Wheeling	Danny Lauby (89.77)	7 – 5	Jacob Taylor (87.99)	
7	Saturday 12 August	Cambridge Newfoundland Club, (Canada) Cambridge	Stowe Buntz (81.88)	7 – 4	Alex Spellman (82.34)	
8	Saturday 12 August	Cambridge Newfoundland Club, (Canada) Cambridge	Stowe Buntz (84.14)	7 – 6	Alex Spellman (85.11)	
9	Sunday 13 August	Cambridge Newfoundland Club, (Canada) Cambridge	Stowe Buntz (91.28)	7 – 2	Jim Long (85.50)	
10	Friday 8 September	American Legion Post 331, (United States) Brownsburg	Alex Spellman (100.19)	7 – 3	Leonard Gates (94.38)	
11	Saturday 9 September	American Legion Post 331, (United States) Brownsburg	David Cameron (86.31)	7 – 3	Stowe Buntz (92.80)	
12	Sunday 10 September	American Legion Post 331, (United States) Brownsburg	Leonard Gates (98.50)	7 – 2	David Cameron (92.31)	

=== North American Championship ===
As in the previous year, the North American Championship was played on the Saturday afternoon of the US Darts Masters.

Under PDC Rule 3.9, champion Jeff Smith (third year of Tour Card) was not eligible to qualify for the 2024 PDC World Darts Championship or 2023 Grand Slam of Darts by virtue of winning the North American Championship.

Quarter-finals (best of 11 legs); 3 Jun
1	Matt Campbell 92.68	6
Jason Brandon 83.78	4
4	Alex Spellman 90.34	6
J.T. Davis 83.12	3
2	Jeff Smith 91.02	6
Jim Long 87.48	5
3	Jules van Dongen 79.30	6
Jake Macmillan 81.49	5

Semi-finals (best of 11 legs); 3 Jun
1	Matt Campbell 92.41	6
4	Alex Spellman 87.54	2
2	Jeff Smith 93.08	6
3	Jules van Dongen 77.54	1

Final (best of 11 legs); 3 Jun
1	Matt Campbell 91.20	5
2	Jeff Smith 88.52	6

=== Cross-Border Darts Challenge ===
Before the CDC main season started, there was also a new tournament called the Cross-Border Darts Challenge featuring 8 players from both Canada and the United States facing off against each other, with the winner earning a place at the 2023 US Darts Masters. The event took place at White Eagle Hall in Jersey City, New Jersey on 21–22 April.

Joey Lynaugh replaces Danny Baggish in the tournament.

First round (best of 7 legs); 21 Apr
Joey Lynaugh 84.35	3
Keith Way 83.55	4
CAN4	Jim Long 81.18	4
Chuck Puleo 85.94	3
CAN2	Jacob Taylor 87.24	4
Gary Mawson 70.59	1
USA3	Alex Spellman 77.26	4
John Part 77.48	3
CAN1	David Cameron 77.38	3
Jules van Dongen 78.21	4
USA4	Larry Butler 80.77	2
Jeff Smith 82.01	4
USA2	Leonard Gates 82.35	1
Steve Warnock 86.24	4
CAN3	John Norman Jnr 81.23	4
Danny Lauby 80.63	1

Quarter-finals (best of 9 legs); 22 Apr
Keith Way 88.11	4
CAN4	Jim Long 88.58	5
CAN2	Jacob Taylor 84.86	5
USA3	Alex Spellman 83.26	3
Jules van Dongen 90.56	0
Jeff Smith 96.35	5
Steve Warnock 89.30	5
CAN3	John Norman Jnr 85.13	3

Semi-finals (best of 9 legs); 22 Apr
CAN4	Jim Long 90.62	5
CAN2	Jacob Taylor 87.14	2
Jeff Smith 86.38	5
Steve Warnock 81.71	0

Final (best of 11 legs); 22 Apr
CAN4	Jim Long 69.57	0
Jeff Smith 79.81	6

=== CDC Continental Cup 2023 ===
The top 16 players in North America qualified for the CDC Continental Cup. The winner became CDC Tour Champion, with the winner also earning a place at the 2023 Grand Slam of Darts as well as the 2024 US Darts Masters and 2024 North American Darts Championship.

First round (best of 9 legs); 20 Oct
1	Alex Spellman 89.46	5
16	Ryan Vander Weit 66.26	0
8	Jason Brandon 85.12	5
9	Doug Boehm 84.73	3
4	David Cameron 81.69	5
13	Gary Mawson 73.92	3
5	Danny Lauby 81.02	5
12	Keith Way 78.32	3
2	Stowe Buntz 104.15	5
15	Jake Macmillan 88.68	2
7	Jim Long 88.30	4
10	Larry Butler 83.23	5
3	Leonard Gates 92.95	5
14	Jake Womack 85.77	3
6	Jacob Taylor 93.94	5
11	J.T. Davis 77.08	0

Quarter-finals (best of 11 legs); 21 Oct
1	Alex Spellman 85.74	5
8	Jason Brandon 87.33	6
4	David Cameron 93.39	6
5	Danny Lauby 91.38	5
2	Stowe Buntz 78.97	6
10	Larry Butler 75.34	2
3	Leonard Gates 71.19	1
6	Jacob Taylor 90.44	6

Semi-finals (best of 13 legs); 21 Oct
8	Jason Brandon 88.60	7
4	David Cameron 87.10	4
2	Stowe Buntz 83.10	7
6	Jacob Taylor 83.20	2

Final (best of 15 legs); 21 Oct
8	Jason Brandon 85.06	6
2	Stowe Buntz 84.98	8

The CDC Evolution Tour 2023 final was held on the same day as the CDC Continental Cup, with the following results:

Winner	Legs	Runner-up	Ref.
Gavin Nicoll (71.89)	6 – 5	Brayden Hall (63.21)	

== African Continental Tour ==
On 15 February 2023, it was announced that in co-operation with the African Darts Group, a first ever African Continental Tour would take place. It included qualifiers for the 2023 PDC World Cup of Darts, as well as the 2023 PDC World Youth Championship and the 2024 PDC World Darts Championship.

African Continental Tours rankings
Rank	Player	Points
1	Cameron Carolissen	2160
2	Stefan Vermaak	1210
3	Vernon Bouwers	1130
4	Grant Sampson	770
5	Dameon Steffens	680

No.	Date	Winner	Legs	Runner up	Ref.
1	Saturday 12 August	Stefan Vermaak (74.79)	8 – 7	Simon Adams (72.99)	
2	Saturday 23 September	Cameron Carolissen (101.15)	8 – 2	Vernon Bouwers (89.10)	
3	Saturday 29 October	Cameron Carolissen (82.70)	8 – 7	Grant Sampson (77.29)	
4	Friday 17 November	Cameron Carolissen (92.55)	8 – 5	Vernon Bouwers (84.72)	

The African Continental Tour Grand Final was held on 18 November 2023. The results from the quarter-final onwards are shown.

Quarter-finals (best of 11 legs); 18 Nov
1	Cameron Carolissen 81.91	6
9	Deon Oliver 59.79	1
13	Charles Losper Snr. 64.05	2
5	Simon Adams 71.71	6
15	Carl Gabriel 72.14	6
10	Tyrone Shackleton 71.30	5
3	Vernon Bouwers 102.48	6
6	Dameon Steffens 82.86	0

Semi-finals (best of 13 legs); 18 Nov
1	Cameron Carolissen 83.50	7
5	Simon Adams 74.22	0
15	Carl Gabriel 79.85	6
3	Vernon Bouwers 83.89	7

Final (best of 15 legs); 18 Nov
1	Cameron Carolissen 91.61	8
3	Vernon Bouwers 78.99	1

=== African qualifier for 2024 PDC World Darts Championship ===
The African qualifier for the World Darts Championship was held on 24 September 2023. The results from the quarter-final onwards are shown.

Quarter-finals (best of 11 legs); 24 Sep
1	Stefan Vermaak 69.03	6
8	Charles Losper Snr. 69.01	5
Tyrone Shackleton 83.18	4
5	Graham Filby 91.73	6
2	Simon Adams 70.04	6
Benson Ngari 70.84	5
Xander Faddel 74.68	6
11	Giovanni Mathee 74.72	5

Semi-finals (best of 13 legs); 24 Sep
1	Stefan Vermaak 70.79	7
5	Graham Filby 75.31	5
2	Simon Adams 72.82	7
Xander Faddel 72.11	6

Final (best of 15 legs); 24 Sep
1	Stefan Vermaak 73.12	0
2	Simon Adams 93.94	8

== Championship Darts Latin America and Caribbean (CDLC) Tour ==
The 2023 CDLC Tour began in the Costa Rican capital of San José from 4–6 August, with two warm-up events being followed by back-to-back CDLC Tour events on the weekend 5–6 August. The Hotel Torremayor in Santiago then hosted the second and final weekend from 13–15 October, with CDLC Tour Events Three and Four taking place in Chile. Following the conclusion of October's double-header, the player at the top of the CDLC Order of Merit qualified for the 2024 PDC World Darts Championship at London's Alexandra Palace in December.

2023 CDLC Tour rankings
Rank	Player	Points
1	Norman Madhoo	44
2	Sudesh Fitzgerald	38
3	Guillermo Soto	34
4	Alex Gutierrez	32
5	Jesús Sálate	30

No.	Date	City	Winner	Legs	Runner up	Ref.
1	Saturday 5 August	(Costa Rica) San José	Norman Madhoo (75.71)	6 – 3	Sudesh Fitzgerald (72.38)	
2	Sunday 6 August	(Costa Rica) San José	Sudesh Fitzgerald (68.26)	6 – 2	Alex Gutierrez (62.10)	
3	Saturday 14 October	(Chile) Santiago	Norman Madhoo (80.02)	6 – 3	Jesús Sálate (82.21)	
4	Sunday 15 October	(Chile) Santiago	Artur Valle (69.58)	6 – 4	Guillermo Soto (70.48)	
