= Darren Penhall =

English darts player

Personal information
- Nickname: "Smooth Operator"
- Born: 18 November 1972 (age 53) St Austell, Cornwall, England
- Home town: Coochiemudlo Island, Australia

Sport
- Sport: Darts
- Playing since: 2012
- Darts: 22g
- Laterality: Right-handed
- Walk-on music: "Country Girl (Shake It for Me)" by Luke Bryan

Organisation (see split in darts)
- PDC: 2020–present (Tour Card: 2020-2021)

PDC premier events – best performances
- World Championship: Last 64: 2024
- UK Open: Last 160: 2020

Other tournament wins
- Years
ADA Tour	2026
DPA Pro Tour	2023 (x13), 2025

Darren Penhall (born 18 November 1972) is an English-born Australian darts player who competes in Professional Darts Corporation (PDC) events.

== Career ==
Penhall entered Q-School in January 2020 and won his Tour Card on the fourth day by finishing eleventh on the UK Q-School Order of Merit. He will play on the PDC ProTour in 2020 and 2021.

After losing his Tour Card, he returned to Australia, and took part in the DPA Tour from 2023. He won his first Australian title in February 2023. Penhall has dominated the DPA circuit in 2023, reaching 18 finals in 25 events, and winning 13 of those to boast a lead at the top of the DPA Order of Merit, qualifying for 2024 PDC World Darts Championship.

Penhall played Jules van Dongen in the first round and won 3–1. Despite the win, he revealed his plans to walk away from the sport after the tournament. In the second round, he lost 0–3 to Joe Cullen.

He came out of retirement in 2025 and returned to competitive darts on the DPA Pro Tour, winning a title in event five.

== World Championship results ==
=== PDC ===
- 2024: Second round (lost to Joe Cullen 0–3) (sets)

== Performance timeline ==
Tournament	2020	2021	2024
PDC Ranked televised events
World Championship	DNQ		2R
UK Open	1R	WD	DNP
Career statistics
Year-end ranking	152	155	–

=== European Tour ===
Tournament	2020	2022
Belgian Championship	1R	NH
German Championship	1R	DNP
European Open	NH	2R

=== Players Championships ===
Season	1	2	3	4	5	6	7	8	9	10	11	12	13	14	15	16	17	18	19	20	21	22	23	24	25	26	27	28	29	30
2020	BAR; 2R	BAR; 1R	WIG; 1R	WIG; 1R	WIG; 3R	WIG; 1R	BAR; 1R	BAR; 2R	MIL; 1R	MIL; 1R	MIL; 1R	MIL; 1R	MIL; 1R	NIE; DNP					COV; 1R	COV; 1R	COV; 1R	COV; 1R	COV; 1R							
2022	Did not participate								BAR; 3R	BAR; 1R	BAR; 1R	Did not participate																		
