= 2023 Dutch Darts Championship =

Tournament information
- Dates: 28–30 April 2023
- Venue: WTC Expo
- Location: Leeuwarden, Netherlands
- Organisation(s): Professional Darts Corporation (PDC)
- Format: Legs
- Prize fund: £175,000
- Winner's share: £30,000
- High checkout: 170; Michael van Gerwen (x2); Damon Heta

Champion(s)
- Dave Chisnall

The 2023 Dutch Darts Championship was a professional darts tournament that took place at the WTC Expo in Leeuwarden, Netherlands from 28 to 30 April 2023. It was the sixth of thirteen European Tour events on the 2023 PDC Pro Tour. It featured a field of 48 players and £175,000 in prize money, with £30,000 going to the winner.

Michael Smith was the defending champion after defeating Danny Noppert 8–7 in the 2022 final, but he lost 6–4 to Peter Wright in the third round.

Dave Chisnall won his second European Tour title of the year, and as with the first one, he defeated Luke Humphries 8–5 in the final.

This was the first time in European Tour history that all the top four seeds made the semi-finals.

== Prize money ==
The prize money was increased for the first time in 4 years for all European Tours:

Stage (num. of players)		Prize money
Winner	(1)	£30,000
Runner-up	(1)	£12,000
Semi-finalists	(2)	£8,500
Quarter-finalists	(4)	£6,000
Third round losers	(8)	£4,000
Second round losers	(16)	£2,500*
First round losers	(16)	£1,250
Total	£175,000	

- Seeded players who lost in the second round of the event were not credited with prize money on any Order of Merit. A player who qualified as a qualifier, but later became a seed due to the withdrawal of one or more other players was credited with their prize money on all Orders of Merit regardless of how far they progressed in the event.

== Qualification and format ==
The top 16 entrants from the PDC Pro Tour Order of Merit on 7 March 2023 automatically qualified for the event and were seeded into the second round.

The remaining 32 places went on to qualifiers from six qualifying events – 24 from the Tour Card Holder Qualifier (held on 13 March), two from the associate member qualifier, the two highest ranked Dutchmen automatically qualified, alongside two from the Host Nation Qualifier, one from the Nordic & Baltic Associate Member Qualifier, and one from the East European Associate Member Qualifier.

The following players took part in the tournament:

Top 16

1. Luke Humphries (runner-up)
2. Dave Chisnall (champion)
3. Michael van Gerwen (semi-finals)
4. Damon Heta (semi-finals)
5. Dirk van Duijvenbode (third round)
6. Rob Cross (second round)
7. Michael Smith (third round)
8. Nathan Aspinall (third round)
9. Danny Noppert (quarter-finals)
10. Peter Wright (quarter-finals)
11. Ryan Searle (third round)
12. Joe Cullen (second round)
13. Jonny Clayton (second round)
14. Martin Schindler (third round)
15. Josh Rock (third round)
16. Andrew Gilding (third round)

Tour Card Qualifier
- Dylan Slevin (second round)
- Adam Smith-Neale (first round)
- Stephen Bunting (quarter-finals)
- Martin Lukeman (second round)
- Dimitri Van den Bergh (second round)
- Jim Williams (second round)
- Gabriel Clemens (second round)
- Steve Beaton (second round)
- Ross Smith (second round)
- Daryl Gurney (second round)
- Madars Razma (second round)
- Ian White (second round)
- Alan Soutar (first round)
- Ricardo Pietreczko (first round)
- Krzysztof Ratajski (second round)
- Graham Hall (second round)
- Adam Gawlas (first round)
- Arron Monk (first round)
- Kim Huybrechts (first round)
- Gian van Veen (first round)
- Gary Anderson (first round)
- Keane Barry (quarter-finals)
- John O'Shea (first round)
- George Killington (first round)

Associate Member Qualifier
- Andy Boulton (first round)
- Marcel Hausotter (first round)

Highest ranking Dutchmen
- Jermaine Wattimena (first round)
- Raymond van Barneveld (first round)

Host nation qualifier
- Martijn Dragt (first round)
- Berry van Peer (third round)

Nordic & Baltic Qualifier
- Marko Kantele (first round)

East European Qualifier
- Roman Benecký (second round)

== Draw ==
The draw was confirmed on 27 April.

First round (best of 11 legs); 21 April
Ross Smith 101.33	6
Jermaine Wattimena 87.79	0
Ian White 97.88	6
Arron Monk 94.98	2
Ricardo Pietreczko 90.94	2
Daryl Gurney 101.18	6
Madars Razma 103.20	6
John O'Shea 86.40	3
Steve Beaton 92.57	6
Kim Huybrechts 99.08	4
Alan Soutar 82.46	2
Berry van Peer 96.17	6
Dylan Slevin 81.24	6
Marcel Hausotter 68.47	0
Stephen Bunting 99.10	6
Adam Smith-Neale 78.67	0
Martin Lukeman 92.91	6
Martijn Dragt 91.96	3
Graham Hall 89.29	6
Adam Gawlas 75.47	0
Jim Williams 104.25	6
George Killington 87.61	1
Andy Boulton 89.27	4
Krzysztof Ratajski 99.78	6
Gian van Veen 95.85	5
Gabriel Clemens 98.32	6
Gary Anderson 87.66	2
Roman Benecký 89.12	6
Keane Barry 95.66	6
Marko Kantele 83.28	2
Raymond van Barneveld 91.92	3
Dimitri Van den Bergh 105.62	6

Second round (best of 11 legs); 22 April
1	Luke Humphries 101.42	6
Ross Smith 97.98	3
16	Andrew Gilding 108.58	6
Ian White 100.85	4
8	Nathan Aspinall 89.78	6
Daryl Gurney 89.87	4
9	Danny Noppert 96.06	6
Madars Razma 89.41	1
4	Damon Heta 87.06	6
Steve Beaton 92.48	4
13	Jonny Clayton 97.66	5
Berry van Peer 97.89	6
5	Dirk van Duijvenbode 92.93	6
Dylan Slevin 85.08	5
12	Joe Cullen 95.16	5
Stephen Bunting 94.54	6
2	Dave Chisnall 100.48	6
Martin Lukeman 93.48	4
15	Josh Rock 92.16	6
Graham Hall 84.33	2
7	Michael Smith 100.46	6
Jim Williams 93.42	4
10	Peter Wright 87.51	6
Krzysztof Ratajski 87.23	5
3	Michael van Gerwen 97.45	6
Gabriel Clemens 83.79	2
14	Martin Schindler 90.46	6
Roman Benecký 81.02	4
6	Rob Cross 104.43	3
Keane Barry 101.50	6
11	Ryan Searle 109.14	6
Dimitri Van den Bergh 105.37	1

Third round (best of 11 legs); 23 April
1	Humphries 96.08	6
16	Gilding 91.93	4
8	Aspinall 84.78	5
9	Noppert 89.81	6
4	Heta 96.31	6
van Peer 89.80	1
5	van Duijvenbode 97.06	4
Bunting 100.25	6
2	Chisnall 102.51	6
15	Rock 91.99	3
7	Smith 94.80	4
10	Wright 102.71	6
3	van Gerwen 97.40	6
14	Schindler 91.17	2
Barry 92.06	6
11	Searle 94.48	5

Quarter-finals (best of 11 legs); 23 April
1	Humphries 102.38	6
9	Noppert 92.19	5
4	Heta 97.98	6
Bunting 89.39	2
2	Chisnall 95.74	6
10	Wright 90.00	1
3	van Gerwen 91.22	6
Barry 92.13	3

Semi-finals (best of 13 legs); 23 April
1	Humphries 91.83	7
4	Heta 86.47	3
2	Chisnall 91.43	7
3	van Gerwen 89.12	6

Final (best of 15 legs); 23 April
1	Humphries 96.31	5
2	Chisnall 99.89	8
