= Interwetten =

Online gambling company

Interwetten Ltd.
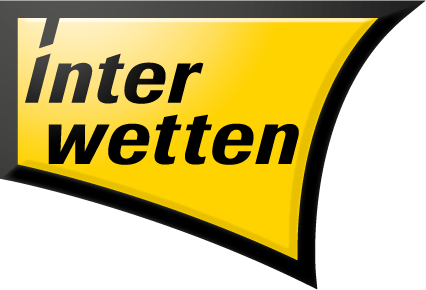
- Industry: Gambling
- Founded: 1990
- Headquarters: Gżira, Malta
- Products: Sports betting, Online games, Online casino
- Revenue: € 39.3 million (2013)
- Number of employees: approx. 100

Interwetten was founded in 1990. It operates in the field of online entertainment, offering its customers sports betting, live betting, a casino, a live casino, and games.

In 1997, Interwetten became the second company in the world, after Intertops, to also offer sports betting online. Today, the company is based in Malta.

The online entertainment platform is currently available in ten languages and is visited by users in more than 200 countries around the world. The company is particularly well known in German-speaking countries and southern Europe for its sports betting offer. In 2012, Interwetten users placed bets on more than 100,000 different sports events held in over 70 countries.

Interwetten was one of the founding members of the non-profit organization, the European Gaming and Betting Association (EGBA). It is also a member of the European Sports Security Association (ESSA) which was established in 2005.

== Licenses ==
Interwetten Gaming Ltd. in Malta holds licenses to operate various online gambling services, including sports betting, online games, and a casino. These licenses authorize and regulate the company's activities in the specified areas of the online gaming industry.

On 1 June 2012, Interwetten España Plc. was officially licensed by Spanish regulatory authority DGOJ, and since then it has been online in Spain with a sports betting and casino game portfolio.

Since December 2012, Interwetten Gaming Ltd. has been authorized to offer sports betting in Schleswig-Holstein. Authorization for casino games was granted by the Ministry of the Interior of Schleswig-Holstein in January 2013.

Interwetten Gaming Ltd. expanded into Africa for the first time in March 2020 by acquiring a Nigerian betting license from the National Lottery Regulatory Commission. To strengthen their visibility and gain further traction in the market, Interwetten recently signed the Nigerian footballer Yakubu Ayegbeni as their official Nigeria ambassador.

== Company History ==
Interwetten was founded in September 1990 in Vienna, Austria. Between 1990 and 1997, the company exclusively offered sports betting, with customers placing their bets via telephone. In 1997, Interwetten took its business online, and in 2004, a casino area was added to the product portfolio. In June 2006, Interwetten launched a Skill Games platform.

== Product Portfolio ==
=== Sports betting ===
Interwetten has been providing sports betting services since 1990. The online platform was introduced in 1997.

=== Casino ===
Customers have been able to visit Interwetten online casino since July 2004. The casino games, which are particularly popular among female customers, include classics such as Roulette and Blackjack. The live casino offer is also very popular among the casino's visitors.

=== Online games ===
In 2006, Interwetten expanded its product portfolio by introducing a skill games platform. This platform includes games designed to test the player's skill and aptitude, offering a diverse range of challenges within the company's offerings. Among these products are also particular games such as "Schnapsen", which is not widely available as an online game.

=== Mobile platform ===
==== Sports betting ====
The betting offer is optimized for Android mobile phones, the iPhone and iPad, and Windows Phones. The "Today" shortcut, for example, shows the user the betting programme over the next 24 hours.

==== Casino and Live Casino ====
Interwetten offers its customers access to the online casino in a format designed especially for tablets and smartphones.
