= 2023 PDC World Darts Championship =

30th edition of the PDC's World Championship event

2022/23 Cazoo World Darts Championship

Tournament information
- Dates: 15 December 2022 – 3 January 2023
- Venue: Alexandra Palace
- Location: London, England
- Organisation(s): Professional Darts Corporation (PDC)
- Format: Sets; Final – first to 7 sets
- Prize fund: £2,500,000
- Winner's share: £500,000
- Nine-dart finish: Michael Smith
- High checkout: 170; Martin Schindler; Michael Smith; Chris Dobey; Dirk van Duijvenbode; Dimitri Van den Bergh; Michael van Gerwen

Champion(s)
- Michael Smith (ENG)

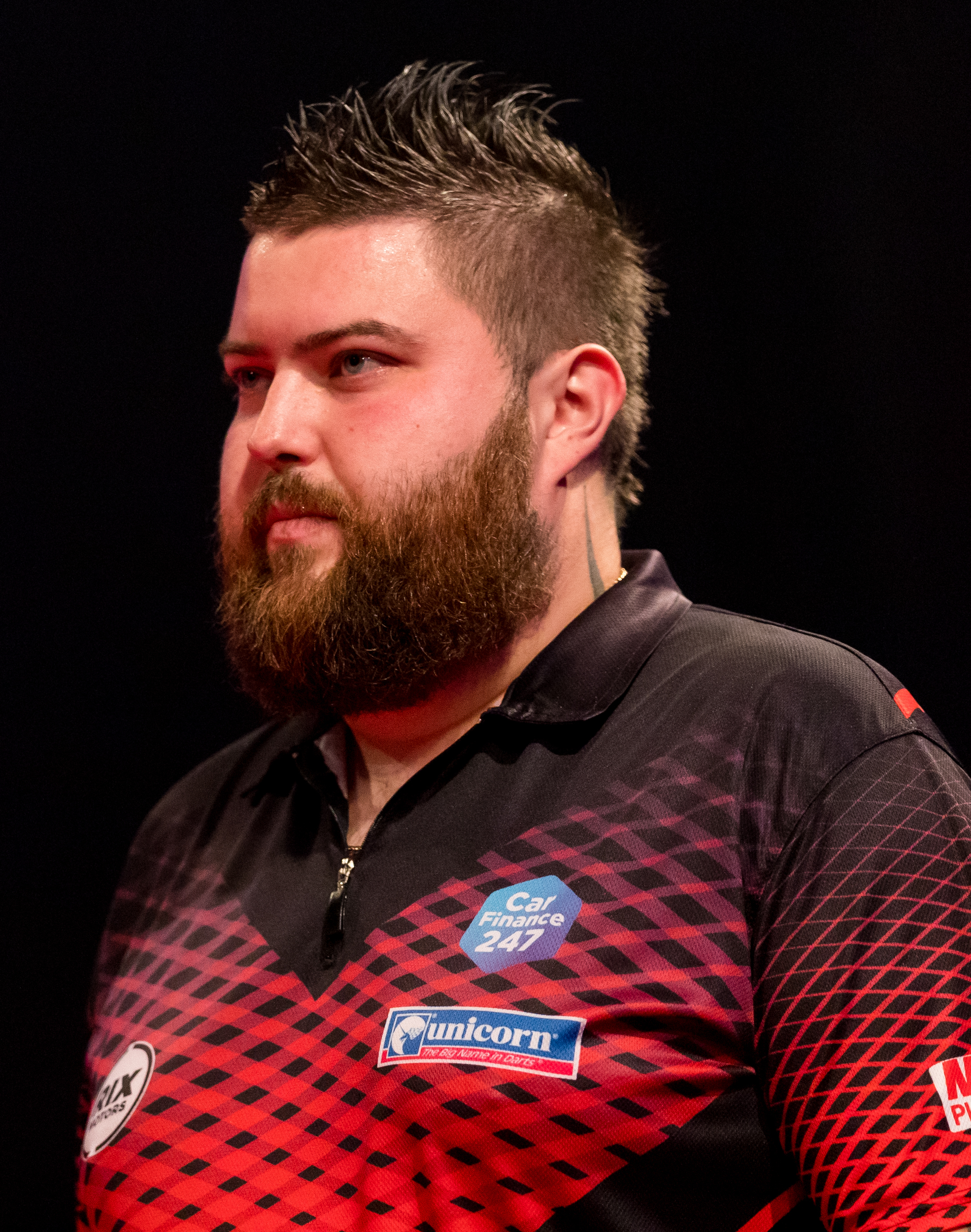
Michael Smith won the PDC World Darts Championship for the first time

The 2023 PDC World Darts Championship (known for sponsorship reasons as the 2022/23 Cazoo World Darts Championship) was a professional darts event that took place at Alexandra Palace in London, England, from 15 December 2022 to 3 January 2023. It was the thirtieth World Darts Championship to be organised by the Professional Darts Corporation since it separated from the now-defunct British Darts Organisation.

Steve Beaton made a record-extending 32nd consecutive World Championship appearance, but lost in the first round to Danny van Trijp, and Dutchman Raymond van Barneveld became the second player to make 30 World Championship appearances. Peter Wright was the defending champion, having defeated Michael Smith in the 2022 final, but he lost 4–1 to Kim Huybrechts in the third round.

Smith defeated Michael van Gerwen 7–4 in the final, winning his first world title and reaching world number one on the PDC Order of Merit for the first time. Smith hit the only nine-dart finish of the tournament in the final, with the score at 1–0 in sets to van Gerwen and 1–1 in legs, when van Gerwen had thrown eight darts at trebles and missed a dart at double 12 for a nine-dart finish himself in the same leg. Broadcasters and commentators subsequently labelled the leg as the greatest in the history of darts.

== Overview ==
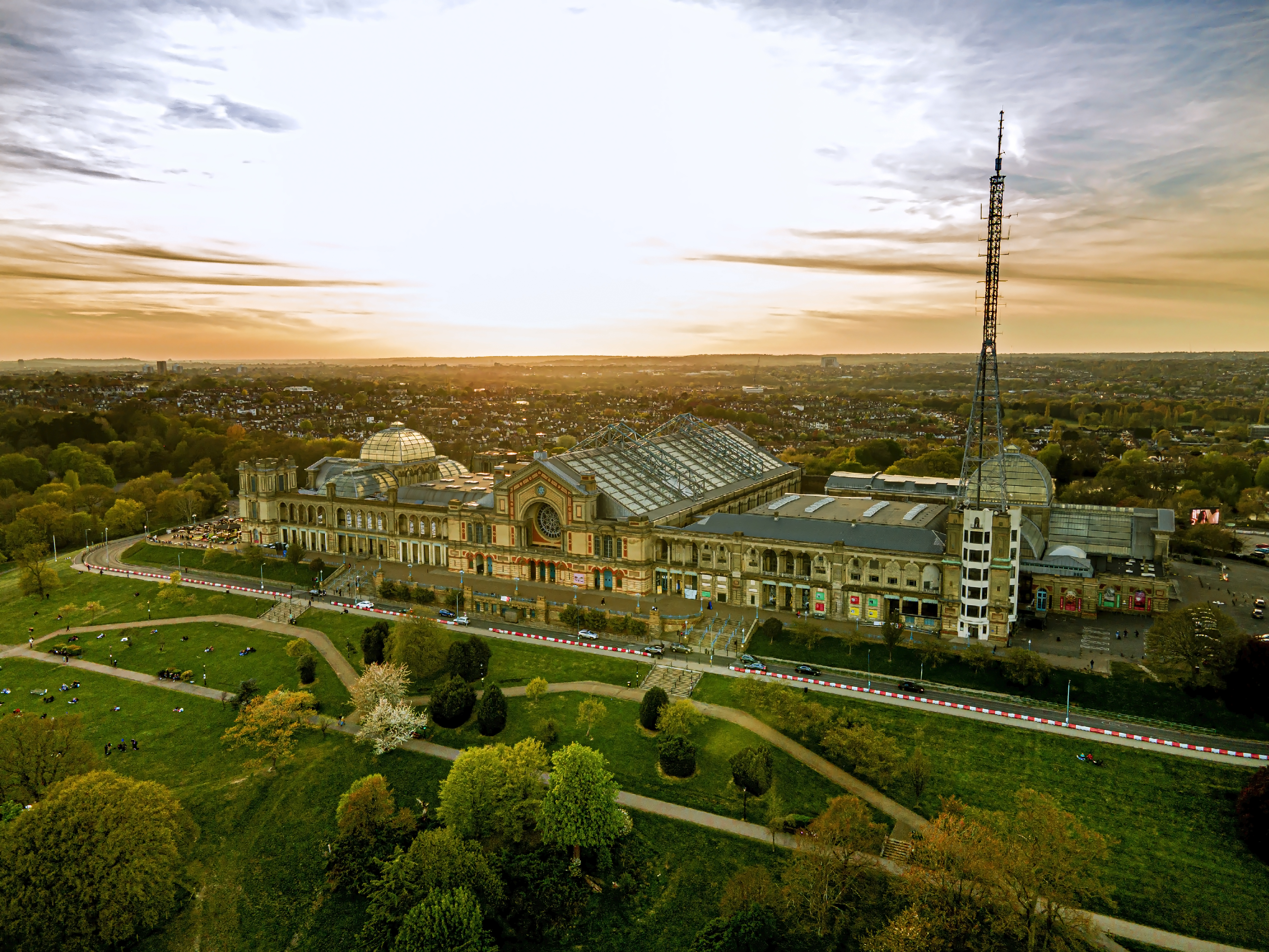
Alexandra Palace in London, host venue for the event

In January 2022, it was announced that online car retailer Cazoo would become the new title sponsor on a multi-year deal. The deal brought an end to 20 years of the tournament being sponsored by bookmakers, with Ladbrokes sponsoring the event from 2003 to 2014, before William Hill's sponsorship of the event began the following year. The deal was Cazoo's fifth title sponsorship within the PDC, following deals to secure the naming rights for the World Cup of Darts, the European Championship, the Grand Slam of Darts, and the Premier League Darts. Japanese company Toyo Tires also sponsored the event, with their logo being worn on the sleeves of all 96 players.

As part of a four-year contract extension signed in 2021, the event was staged at Alexandra Palace in London. The same venue has been used since the 2008 championship. The dartboard used for the event was the Winmau Blade 6 Triple Core, used for the first time at a PDC World Championship following the end of the PDC's 25-year partnership with manufacturer Unicorn in January 2022.

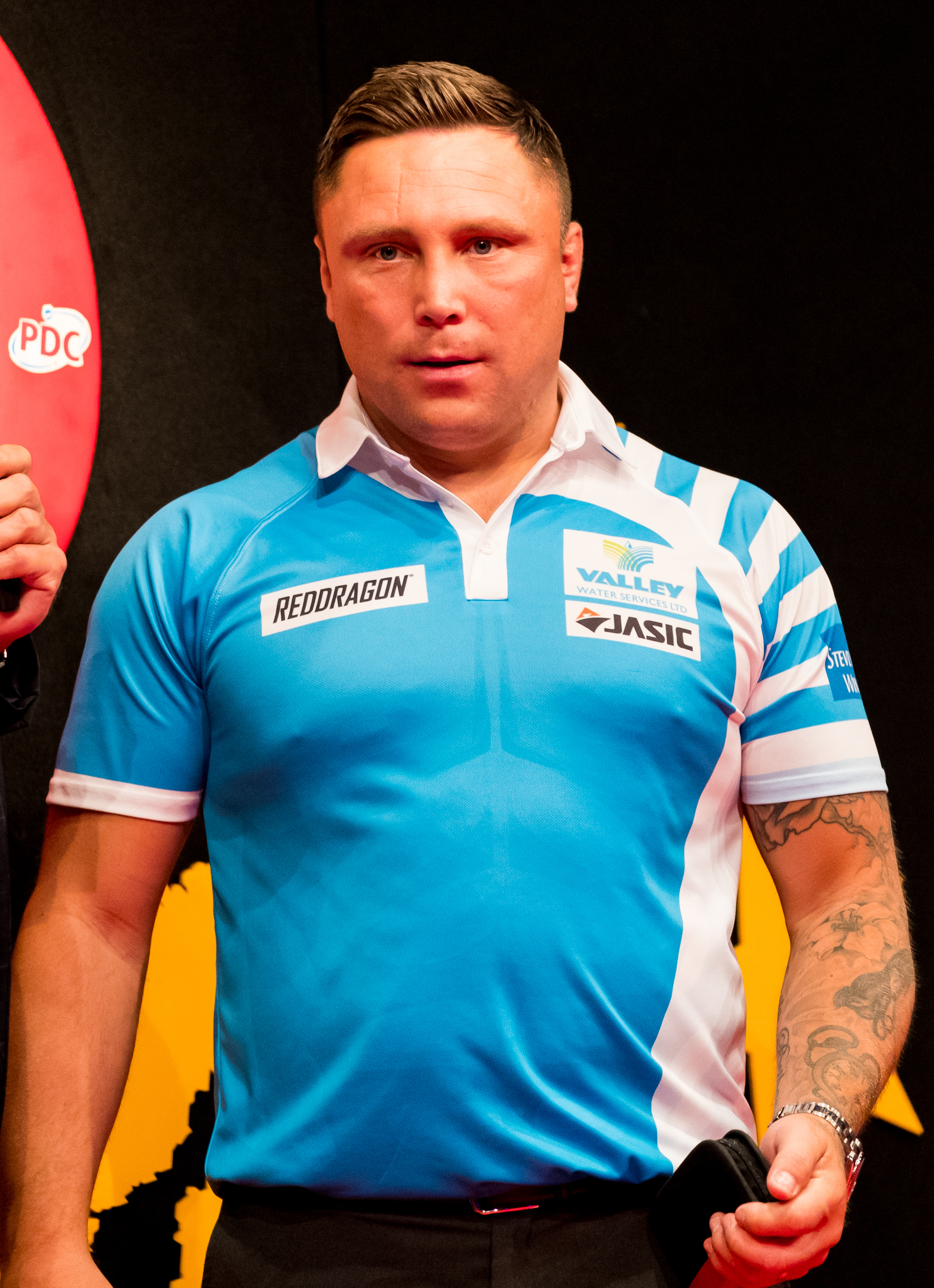
Gerwyn Price, the 2021 champion, was the top seed at the 2023 tournament.

Dutchman Michael van Gerwen went into the event widely seen as the favourite to lift his fourth championship, with Sky Sports pundits Wayne Mardle and Mark Webster both backing him, while rival Gerwyn Price of Wales declared him as "the one to beat". Van Gerwen himself said that he had nothing to prove, but warned his rivals that "there is only more to come", but acknowledged that as he was a favourite he was a "big target". Ladbrokes, who returned to sponsoring the event as an "official betting partner", gave odds of 13/5 for Van Gerwen.

Wright's own preparations received a setback in November when his wife was rushed to hospital during the Grand Slam, following which he pulled out of the Players Championship Finals, but he told Oche magazine that he would return in time to defend his championship.

=== Prize money ===
The prize money for the tournament remained at £2.5 million in total for the fifth year in a row, with the winner's share totalling £500,000. Additionally, a special jackpot of £100,000 was created by tournament sponsors Selco in the event a player hit two nine-dart finishes, with the player receiving £50,000 and the remainder split between Cancer Research UK and a member of the public chosen at random. Gerwyn Price described it as a "great initiative", particularly amid the cost of living crisis in the United Kingdom. In addition, the winner of the tournament receives the Sid Waddell Trophy, named after the former commentator who died in 2012.

Position (no. of players)		Prize money (Total: £2,500,000)
Winner	(1)	£500,000
Runner-up	(1)	£200,000
Semi-finalists	(2)	£100,000
Quarter-finalists	(4)	£50,000
Fourth round losers	(8)	£35,000
Third round losers	(16)	£25,000
Second round losers	(32)	£15,000
First round losers	(32)	£7,500

=== Format ===
All matches were played as single in, double out – requiring the players to score 501 points to win a leg, finishing on either a double or the bullseye. Matches were played in set format, with each set being the best of five legs (first to three).

For all rounds except the first, the deciding set had to be won by two or more clear legs; however, if the set score went to 5–5, a sudden-death leg was played with no throw for the bull.

Round	Best of (sets)	First to (sets)
First	5	3
Second	5	3
Third	7	4
Fourth	7	4
Quarter-finals	9	5
Semi-finals	11	6
Final	13	7

== Qualification ==
96 players competed in the championship, with the thirty-two highest ranked players on the PDC Order of Merit being seeded to the second round, and the next thirty-two highest ranked players from the 2022 PDC Pro Tour Order of Merit and thirty-two players from the various qualifiers going into the first round.

=== Seeds ===
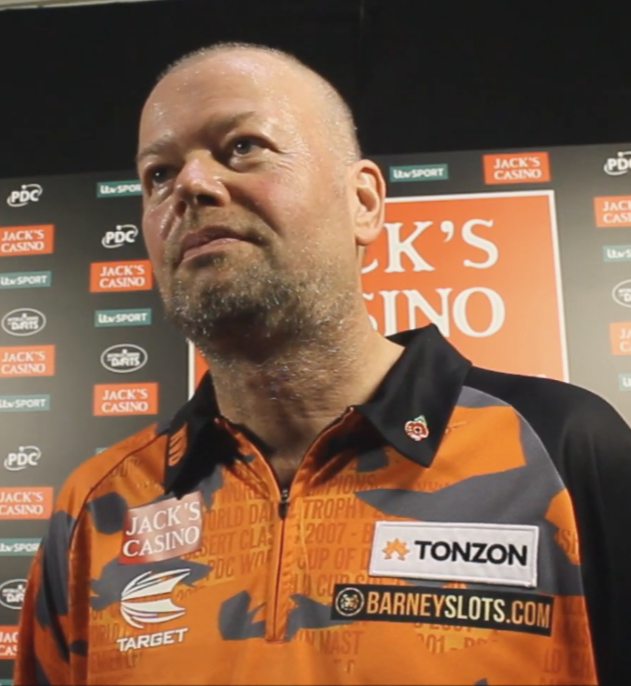
Raymond van Barneveld qualified for a 30th World Championship, only the second player to do so.

2021 PDC World Champion and 2022 World Series Finals winner Gerwyn Price was top of the two-year PDC Order of Merit and number one seed going into the tournament. Reigning champion from 2022 Peter Wright, who was also champion in 2020, was second seed and Michael van Gerwen, the three-time World Champion from 2014, 2017 and 2019, was third seed; having in 2022 won four major titles; the Premier League, the World Matchplay, the World Grand Prix and the Players Championship Finals. As well as Price, Wright and Van Gerwen, three other previous PDC world champions qualified as seeds; 2018 champion Rob Cross was the 6th seed, and 2015 and 2016 champion Gary Anderson was 11th seeded. 2007 champion Raymond van Barneveld was the 32nd and final seed, qualifying for his 30th world championship and becoming only the second player to do. 2014 BDO World Champion Stephen Bunting qualified as 21st seed as one of two BDO champions to qualify as seeds, alongside four-time BDO champion Van Barneveld.

The top seeds behind Price, Wright and Van Gerwen were 2022 Grand Slam of Darts champion Michael Smith, four-time 2022 European Tour event winner Luke Humphries, Cross, Jonny Clayton, and James Wade. Other 2022 major event champions to qualify as seeds were the 9th seeded UK Open champion Dutchman Danny Noppert, Masters champion Joe Cullen at 13th seed, European Champion Ross Smith in 19th with Damon Heta, one half of the victorious Australian World Cup team, one place below him in 20th.

=== Pro Tour qualification ===
Northern Irish newcomer Josh Rock, an event winner on the 2022 PDC Pro Tour and 2022 World Youth Champion, was the highest-ranked non-seed on the 2022 PDC Pro Tour Order of Merit in his debut year. 2011 and 2012 champion Adrian Lewis was a qualifier via the Pro Tour. 1996 BDO champion Steve Beaton also qualified, extending his record to 32 consecutive World Championship appearances.

As well as Rock, other players making their debuts were Martin Lukeman, Scott Williams, Danny Jansen, Cameron Menzies, John O'Shea and Adam Gawlas. Other players qualifying via the Pro Tour included Heta's World Cup of Darts teammate Simon Whitlock.

=== International qualifiers ===
The final group of 32 qualifiers were determined by a series of international qualifiers and secondary tours. The PDC Development and Challenge Tours, having been split into UK and EU sections in 2021, were restored as unified tours, with the top two from each tour qualifying. A new Asian Championship was held for the first time, with the four semi-finalists from that event qualifying for the World Championship. The Euro-Asian Darts Corporation qualifier, which was predominately contested by players from Russia and Belarus, was cancelled after both countries were suspended in the wake of the 2022 Russian invasion of Ukraine. In its place, a special qualifier was held for Ukrainian players only, with Vladyslav Omelchenko becoming the first Ukrainian player to qualify for the World Championship. The North American Championship was held for the first time since 2019, having been cancelled the previous two years due to COVID-19 restrictions. Qualification events were additionally held for Eastern Europe, Western Europe, South-West Europe, Germany, Australia, New Zealand, Central/Southern America, Japan, China & India, as well as top players from the Nordic & Baltic tour and the North American Championship Darts Circuit qualifying.

Four-time BDO Women's World Champion Lisa Ashton and inaugural WDF Women's World Champion Beau Greaves qualified via the PDC Women's Tour. The first Women's World Matchplay, held in July 2022, was retrospectively declared to carry a World Championship spot in November, granting qualification to Fallon Sherrock, the only woman to have previously won a match at the event. 2022 World Seniors Darts Masters champion David Cameron was another qualifier, having been the highest ranked Canadian player on the Championship Darts Circuit. The final three places were awarded by a qualifier for non-qualified PDC Tour Card holders, with 1995 BDO World Champion Richie Burnett qualifying for the first time since 2014, and Ryan Joyce and Canadian Jeff Smith also returning to the World Championship.

Debutants via the international and invitation qualifiers were Sebastian Białecki (Poland), David Cameron (Canada), Mal Cuming (Australia), Leonard Gates (United States), Beau Greaves (England), Xicheng Han (China), Prakash Jiwa (India), Paolo Nebrida (Philippines), Vladyslav Omelchenko (Ukraine), Robert Owen (Wales), Nathan Rafferty (Northern Ireland), Grant Sampson (South Africa), Danny van Trijp (Netherlands), and Nobuhiro Yamamoto (Japan).

=== List of qualifiers ===
Order of Merit
Second round (seeded)

1. Gerwyn Price (quarter-finals)
2. Peter Wright (third round)
3. Michael van Gerwen (runner-up)
4. Michael Smith (champion)
5. Luke Humphries (fourth round)
6. Rob Cross (fourth round)
7. Jonny Clayton (quarter-finals)
8. James Wade (second round)
9. Danny Noppert (third round)
10. Nathan Aspinall (third round)
11. Gary Anderson (third round)
12. Dave Chisnall (third round)
13. Joe Cullen (fourth round)
14. Dirk van Duijvenbode (fourth round)
15. Dimitri Van den Bergh (semi-finals)
16. Ryan Searle (third round)
17. José de Sousa (fourth round)
18. Krzysztof Ratajski (third round)
19. Ross Smith (third round)
20. Damon Heta (third round)
21. Stephen Bunting (quarter-finals)
22. Chris Dobey (quarter-finals)
23. Callan Rydz (second round)
24. Daryl Gurney (second round)
25. Gabriel Clemens (semi-finals)
26. Brendan Dolan (third round)
27. Mervyn King (third round)
28. Vincent van der Voort (third round)
29. Martin Schindler (third round)
30. Mensur Suljović (third round)
31. Kim Huybrechts (fourth round)
32. Raymond van Barneveld (third round)

Pro Tour Order of Merit
First round

1. Josh Rock (fourth round)
2. Andrew Gilding (second round)
3. Martin Lukeman (second round)
4. Madars Razma (second round)
5. Adrian Lewis (second round)
6. Rowby-John Rodriguez (first round)
7. Scott Williams (second round)
8. Jim Williams (third round)
9. Ryan Meikle (second round)
10. William O'Connor (second round)
11. Steve Beaton (first round)
12. Jermaine Wattimena (first round)
13. Simon Whitlock (second round)
14. Keane Barry (first round)
15. Keegan Brown (first round)
16. Ricky Evans (second round)
17. Alan Soutar (fourth round)
18. Karel Sedláček (second round)
19. Jamie Hughes (first round)
20. Matt Campbell (first round)
21. Danny Jansen (second round)
22. Mike De Decker (second round)
23. Ritchie Edhouse (first round)
24. Boris Krčmar (second round)
25. Cameron Menzies (second round)
26. Luke Woodhouse (second round)
27. Mickey Mansell (second round)
28. Geert Nentjes (first round)
29. Niels Zonneveld (first round)
30. Martijn Kleermaker (second round)
31. John O'Shea (first round)
32. Adam Gawlas (second round)

International qualifiers
First round

- Lisa Ashton – PDC Women's Series (first round)
- Danny Baggish – CDC Tour US Player (second round)
- Sebastian Białecki – East Europe Qualifier (first round)
- Richie Burnett – PDC Tour Card Holder Qualifier (first round)
- David Cameron – CDC Tour Canadian Player (second round)
- Mal Cuming – DPA Oceanic Masters (first round)
- Leonard Gates – North American Championship (second round)
- Beau Greaves – PDC Women's Series (first round)
- Xicheng Han – PDC China Premier League (first round) (Note: China Premier League winner Zong Xiao Chen withdrew, due to COVID-19 pandemic regulations. His place was taken by the runner up.)
- Florian Hempel – German Super League (second round)
- Jimmy Hendriks – West Europe Qualifier (second round)
- Lourence Ilagan – Asian Championship (second round)
- Prakash Jiwa – Indian Qualifier (first round)
- Ryan Joyce – PDC Tour Card Holder Qualifier (first round)
- José Justicia – South-West Europe Qualifier (first round)
- Darius Labanauskas – PDC Nordic & Baltic (second round)
- Daniel Larsson – PDC Nordic & Baltic (first round)
- Paolo Nebrida – Asian Championship (first round)
- Vladyslav Omelchenko – Ukrainian Qualifier (first round)
- Robert Owen – PDC Challenge Tour (first round)
- Christian Perez – Asian Championship (first round)
- Diogo Portela – Central/South America Qualifier (first round)
- Nathan Rafferty – PDC Development Tour (second round)
- Ben Robb – DPNZ Qualifier (first round)
- Grant Sampson – African Qualifier (second round)
- Fallon Sherrock – Women's World Matchplay (first round)
- Jeff Smith – PDC Tour Card Holder Qualifier (first round)
- Raymond Smith – DPA Satellite Tour (first round)
- Toru Suzuki – Asian Championship (first round)
- Danny van Trijp – PDC Challenge Tour (second round)
- Lewy Williams – PDC Development Tour (second round)
- Nobuhiro Yamamoto – PDJ Championship (first round)

== Summary ==
=== Opening rounds ===
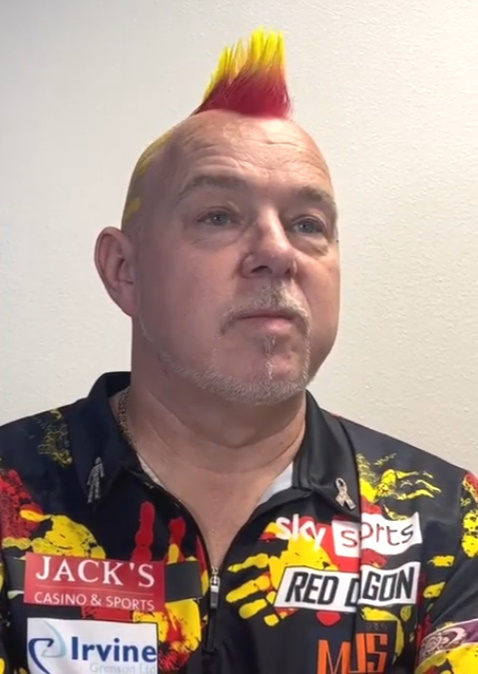
Defending champion Peter Wright was eliminated in the third round by Belgian Kim Huybrechts.

The opening rounds were noted for the unusually low number of unseeded players to make it to the third round, with only three seeds losing, the lowest since the increase to 32 seeded players at the 2006 championship. World number eight James Wade was the highest profile casualty, losing 3–2 to Jim Williams. The other seeds to lose were 23rd seed Callan Rydz, who lost to Josh Rock, and 24th seed Daryl Gurney losing to Alan Soutar, both players by 3–0.

Further seeds passed without much difficulty, with Dirk van Duijvenbode's victory over Karel Sedláček being the only match to go to extra legs, and only a further three games going to the final set. The highest average of the first two rounds was thrown by Ryan Joyce, who was defeated by Scott Williams 3–1 in the first round despite an average of 103.04; the highest winning average was 101.84, achieved by Michael van Gerwen in his victory over Lewy Williams. The first 170 "big fish" finish of the tournament was hit by Martin Schindler in his second round match against Martin Lukeman, the first to be hit by a German player in any PDC World Championship.

=== Third round ===
Reigning champion Peter Wright's title came to an end in the third round, after a 4–1 defeat to Belgian Kim Huybrechts. Wright was one of three former World Champions to lose in the third round, as Raymond van Barneveld was eliminated 4–0 by fellow former champion Gerwyn Price, and Gary Anderson lost to Chris Dobey. Two unseeded players made their way through to the fourth round, Alan Soutar reaching the fourth round for the second consecutive year after a 4–2 win over Danny Noppert, and debutant Josh Rock beating Nathan Aspinall 4–3.

Van Gerwen set a new highest average of the tournament, averaging 107.66 in a 4–2 victory over Mensur Suljović. Michael Smith hit the second 170 checkout of the tournament, in a match that saw him come back from 3–1 down to triumph 4–3 over Schindler. The match between Van Duijvenbode and Ross Smith saw 31 maximum scores – the record for a best of 7 sets match – 19 of which were for Smith, equalling the record for an individual player in a best of 7 match. It was the first match of the tournament to go to a final sudden-death leg, which Van Duijvenbode won.

=== Fourth round ===
Two of the top six seeds were eliminated in the fourth round, former champion Rob Cross losing 4–2 to Dobey, and Luke Humphries being eliminated by Stephen Bunting after a 4–1 defeat. Dobey's win saw him throw one of two 170 finishes in the round, with the other being hit by Van Duijvenbode. Despite the big finish, Van Duijvenbode was eliminated after 4–1 defeat to Van Gerwen.

The runs of Rock and Soutar were both ended in this stage, Rock losing 4–3 to Jonny Clayton and Soutar falling 4–1 to Gabriel Clemens, with Clemens becoming the first ever German player to reach the quarter-final of a PDC World Darts Championship. Dimitri Van den Bergh beat Huybrechts 4–0 in an all Belgian affair, and Price and Michael Smith both triumphed 4–1 over José de Sousa and Joe Cullen respectively.

=== Quarter-finals ===
The quarter-finals were held on New Year's Day. The first to be played was between van den Bergh and Clayton. The first six sets of the match went with throw before van den Bergh took advantage of one missed dart for the seventh set from Clayton to break throw and take a lead which turned out to be decisive after van den Bergh won the eighth set for a 5–3 victory. This made van den Bergh the first Belgian player to qualify for a semi-final, having been eliminated at the quarter-final stage on two previous occasions.

The second quarter-final was between Smith and Bunting. The first two sets were shared before Smith went on a run of three consecutive set wins, only losing two legs over those three sets. Bunting fought back, taking the sixth and seventh set, before missed darts in the eighth set proved decisive, Smith taking it 3–1 and sealing a 5–3 triumph. Smith reached the semi-final for the second consecutive year and the third time overall.

In the third quarter-final, between Price and Clemens, Price took the first set comfortably, but Clemens levelled the match by winning the second set, and then broke Price's throw in the third leg of the third set, taking both that set and the next one 3–1 to hold a 3–1 set lead as the players left the stage for a TV advertising break. Price returned to the stage wearing a large set of ear defenders, and took the first leg comfortably after the break, but Clemens took back control of the match from there and won the next six legs to win 5–1 and continue his historic run for German darts. After the match, Price stated on Instagram that he was not sure he would play in the World Championship again.

The final quarter-final was between van Gerwen and Dobey, and the three-time champion van Gerwen comfortably defeated Dobey to emphasise his status as favourite for the tournament. Dobey only managed to take three legs in the entire match as Van Gerwen won 5–0 with an average of 102.39 to reach his eighth semi-final, and his first since the 2020 tournament.

=== Semi-finals ===
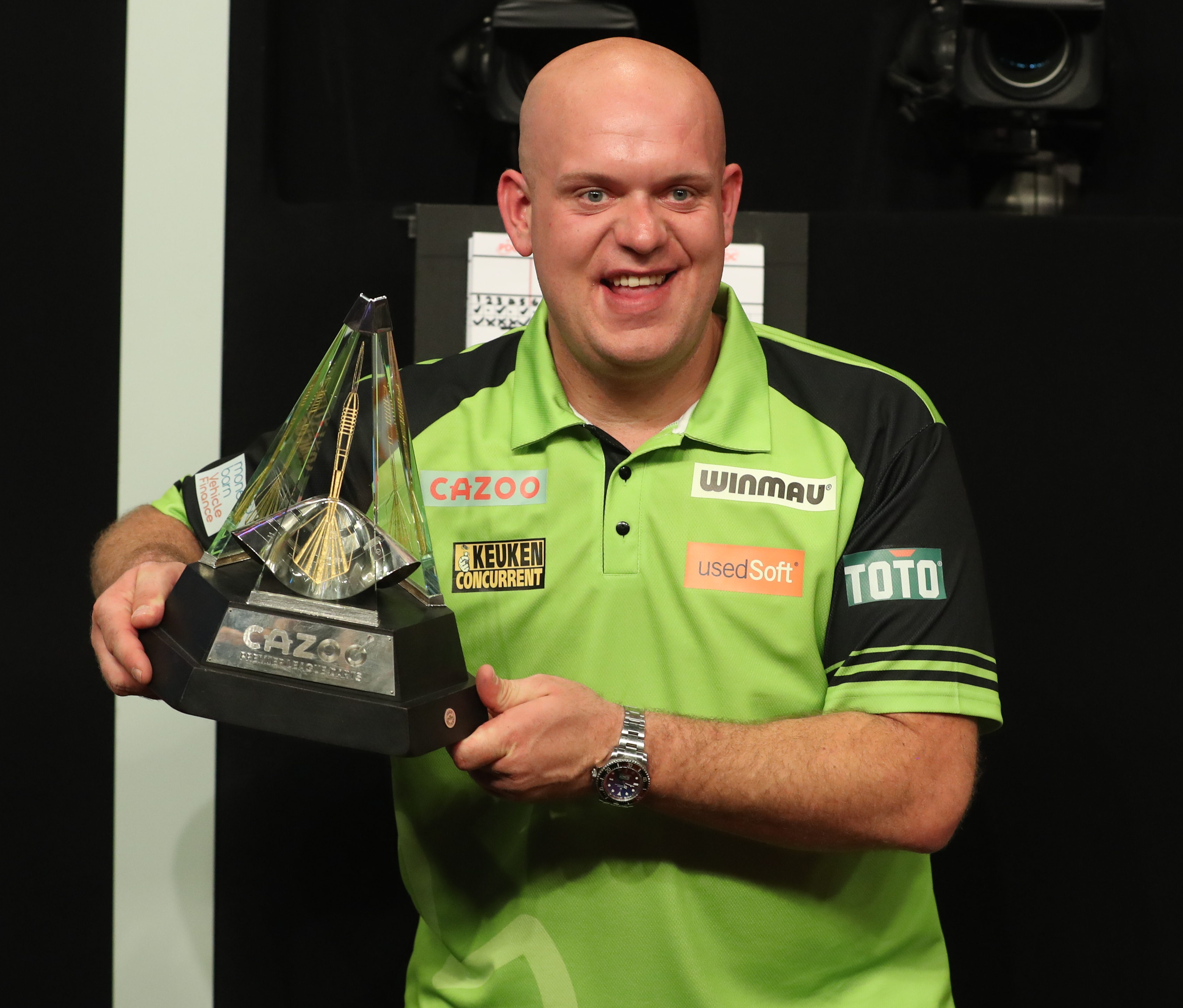
Three-time PDC World Champion Michael van Gerwen reached the final for a sixth time in his career.

The semi-finals were held on 2 January, with Clemens playing Smith in the first to be played. The first four sets all went to last legs but were all holds of throw. Smith took the fifth set 3–0, before taking out a finish of 83 on the bullseye in the sixth set's deciding leg to break the Clemens throw for the first time. Smith held on to the seventh set in another deciding leg to go one set away. A break of the Clemens throw in the third leg gave Smith the lead in the eighth set, which he held on to, securing a 6–2 victory and qualifying for his third world final, and second consecutive.

The second semi-final saw Van den Bergh take on Van Gerwen. Van den Bergh broke the throw in the first set by taking out a 170 finish in the third leg, but Van Gerwen immediately broke back and held the set, before breaking Van den Bergh twice in the second set to win it 3–0. Van Gerwen hit the match's second 170 finish in the second leg of the third set to break Van den Bergh's throw and completed the third set 3–0. Van den Bergh managed to take the fourth set to a final leg but Van Gerwen broke his throw yet again to take a 4–0 lead. Van Gerwen took another 3–0 victory in the fifth set, and took the sixth set by the same scoreline to win 6–0 and reach his sixth final, having only lost three sets in the tournament to that point. Van Gerwen's match average of 108.28 is the highest of the tournament so far.

=== Final ===
The final between Smith and van Gerwen, a repeat of the 2019 PDC World Darts Championship final, took place on 3 January. Smith threw first in the opening set, but lost his throw in the third leg after missing a dart for a 127 checkout, and Van Gerwen held throw in the next leg to take the first set.

In the third leg of the second set, both players opened with 180s, with Van Gerwen following with a 177 while Smith recorded a second straight 180. Van Gerwen then hit the first two treble 20s but missed double 12 for a perfect nine-dart finish and Smith immediately hit treble 20 followed by treble 19 and double 12 to complete his own perfect leg. Smith became just the second player to record a nine-dart finish in a PDC World Championship final after Adrian Lewis became the first in 2011 against Gary Anderson. Broadcasters and sportswriters subsequently labeled the leg as the greatest in darting history, with factors including not just a nine-dart finish in a World Championship final but also 17 out of 18 perfect darts thrown by the two players combined. The 141 finish for Smith was also his highest checkout of the entire match.

Smith subsequently won the next leg to level the set score and also won the third set 3–2, but Van Gerwen levelled the match again with a 3–0 win in set four. Van Gerwen then won the deciding leg in the next set to regain the advantage, but a 3–1 win for Smith restored parity. Van Gerwen looked to be taking the seventh set after winning the first two legs, but Smith fought back and managed to win a deciding leg to go over the half way mark.

In the eighth set it was Smith's turn to take a two leg lead, and unlike the previous set the advantage was not surrendered, with Smith taking the set 3–1. With Van Gerwen now under huge pressure Smith took the ninth set 3–0 to go one away from the Championship. The tenth set went down to a last leg, which Van Gerwen managed to take to keep the match alive. Van Gerwen took the first two legs in the next set, but Smith fought back to set up a deciding leg for the Championship. Smith opened the deciding leg with two 180s and closed on double eight to become World Champion for the first time. The victory also moved Smith to top of the PDC Order of Merit for the first time.

== Schedule ==
The schedule of play was confirmed on 30 November 2022. The first and second rounds took place from 15 to 23 December, when the tournament took a break for Christmas, before resuming on 27 December. The third and fourth rounds were scheduled from 27 to 30 December, with the quarter-final, semi-final and final stages occurring in January 2023.

Thursday, 15 December

Match #	Round	Player 1	Score	Player 2	Set 1	Set 2	Set 3	Set 4	Set 5
Evening session 19:00 (GMT)
01	1	Mickey Mansell 92.49	3 – 1	Ben Robb 89.13	3 – 0	0 – 3	3 – 0	3 – 2	—N/a
02	1	Keane Barry 78.35	1 – 3	Grant Sampson 77.29	2 – 3	2 – 3	3 – 1	1 – 3	—N/a
03	1	Jermaine Wattimena 88.46	2 – 3	Nathan Rafferty 87.63	2 – 3	3 – 2	0 – 3	3 – 0	1 – 3
04	2	Peter Wright 88.34	3 – 0	Mickey Mansell 77.50	3 – 1	3 – 0	3 – 0	—N/a	

Friday, 16 December

Match #	Round	Player 1	Score	Player 2	Set 1	Set 2	Set 3	Set 4	Set 5
Afternoon session 12:30 (GMT)
05	1	Alan Soutar 86.98	3 – 0	Mal Cuming 78.23	3 – 0	3 – 1	3 – 1	—N/a	
06	1	Boris Krčmar 78.21	3 – 0	Toru Suzuki 78.43	3 – 1	3 – 0	3 – 2	—N/a	
07	1	Adrian Lewis 93.57	3 – 0	Daniel Larsson 83.87	3 – 1	3 – 1	3 – 1	—N/a	
08	2	Kim Huybrechts 83.37	3 – 0	Grant Sampson 68.97	3 – 1	3 – 0	3 – 0	—N/a	
Evening session 19:00 (GMT)
09	1	Rowby-John Rodriguez 91.30	2 – 3	Lourence Ilagan 87.98	1 – 3	1 – 3	3 – 1	3 – 0	2 – 3
10	1	William O'Connor 94.26	3 – 0	Beau Greaves 88.34	3 – 2	3 – 2	3 – 0	—N/a	
11	1	Keegan Brown 91.54	2 – 3	Florian Hempel 88.55	2 – 3	3 – 2	3 – 2	1 – 3	2 – 3
12	2	Michael Smith 96.62	3 – 0	Nathan Rafferty 82.39	3 – 0	3 – 0	3 – 0	—N/a	

Saturday, 17 December

Match #	Round	Player 1	Score	Player 2	Set 1	Set 2	Set 3	Set 4	Set 5
Afternoon session 11:00 (GMT)
13	1	Martin Lukeman 87.00	3 – 0	Nobuhiro Yamamoto 83.25	3 – 0	3 – 1	3 – 2	—N/a	
14	1	Simon Whitlock 87.25	3 – 2	Christian Perez 85.81	3 – 0	2 – 3	3 – 2	0 – 3	3 – 1
15	1	Adam Gawlas 84.86	3 – 2	Richie Burnett 85.12	3 – 0	0 – 3	1 – 3	3 – 1	3 – 1
16	2	Daryl Gurney 91.25	0 – 3	Alan Soutar 92.29	2 – 3	2 – 3	2 – 3	—N/a	
Evening session 20:00 (GMT)
17	1	Ryan Meikle 91.88	3 – 2	Lisa Ashton 84.04	3 – 1	3 – 2	2 – 3	2 – 3	3 – 0
18	1	Cameron Menzies 85.92	3 – 1	Diogo Portela 83.03	3 – 1	1 – 3	3 – 1	3 – 1	—N/a
19	1	Josh Rock 93.36	3 – 1	José Justicia 85.66	3 – 1	1 – 3	3 – 1	3 – 0	—N/a
20	2	Dimitri Van den Bergh 94.69	3 – 0	Lourence Ilagan 79.60	3 – 0	3 – 2	3 – 0	—N/a	

Sunday, 18 December

Match #	Round	Player 1	Score	Player 2	Set 1	Set 2	Set 3	Set 4	Set 5
Afternoon session 11:00 (GMT)
21	1	Madars Razma 89.30	3 – 1	Prakash Jiwa 86.19	3 – 2	2 – 3	3 – 2	3 – 0	—N/a
22	1	Karel Sedláček 98.72	3 – 0	Raymond Smith 92.40	3 – 2	3 – 0	3 – 2	—N/a	
23	1	Luke Woodhouse 87.89	3 – 0	Vladyslav Omelchenko 80.51	3 – 0	3 – 2	3 – 1	—N/a	
24	2	Damon Heta 96.17	3 – 0	Adrian Lewis 82.96	3 – 1	3 – 2	3 – 1	—N/a	
Evening session 20:00 (GMT)
25	1	Mike De Decker 88.56	3 – 1	Jeff Smith 92.09	3 – 0	3 – 2	2 – 3	3 – 2	—N/a
26	1	Scott Williams 100.32	3 – 1	Ryan Joyce 103.04	3 – 1	1 – 3	3 – 2	3 – 1	—N/a
27	1	Matt Campbell 93.58	0 – 3	Danny Baggish 92.96	1 – 3	2 – 3	2 – 3	—N/a	
28	2	Nathan Aspinall 97.80	3 – 1	Boris Krčmar 91.88	3 – 2	2 – 3	3 – 1	3 – 0	—N/a

Monday, 19 December

Match #	Round	Player 1	Score	Player 2	Set 1	Set 2	Set 3	Set 4	Set 5
Afternoon session 12:30 (GMT)
29	1	Andrew Gilding 88.43	3 – 2	Robert Owen 86.52	1 – 3	3 – 2	3 – 1	0 – 3	3 – 1
30	1	Danny Jansen 83.42	3 – 2	Paolo Nebrida 82.75	3 – 1	3 – 2	2 – 3	0 – 3	3 – 0
31	1	Niels Zonneveld 86.88	0 – 3	Lewy Williams 92.81	1 – 3	2 – 3	1 – 3	—N/a	
32	2	José de Sousa 86.75	3 – 2	Simon Whitlock 86.23	2 – 3	2 – 3	3 – 0	3 – 1	3 – 1
Evening session 19:00 (GMT)
33	1	Geert Nentjes 78.35	1 – 3	Leonard Gates 81.21	3 – 2	1 – 3	0 – 3	2 – 3	—N/a
34	1	Ritchie Edhouse 87.34	2 – 3	David Cameron 87.86	3 – 0	3 – 2	2 – 3	0 – 3	1 – 3
35	1	Steve Beaton 85.23	0 – 3	Danny van Trijp 87.06	1 – 3	1 – 3	2 – 3	—N/a	
36	2	Gerwyn Price 92.88	3 – 1	Luke Woodhouse 89.05	1 – 3	3 – 2	3 – 1	3 – 0	—N/a

Tuesday, 20 December

Match #	Round	Player 1	Score	Player 2	Set 1	Set 2	Set 3	Set 4	Set 5
Evening session 19:00 (GMT)
37	1	Jim Williams 91.09	3 – 2	Sebastian Białecki 90.32	0 – 3	3 – 1	2 – 3	3 – 0	3 – 1
38	1	Jamie Hughes 79.78	1 – 3	Jimmy Hendriks 78.33	3 – 2	1 – 3	2 – 3	1 – 3	—N/a
39	1	Ricky Evans 89.32	3 – 1	Fallon Sherrock 89.71	1 – 3	3 – 2	3 – 2	3 – 2	—N/a
40	2	Raymond van Barneveld 95.18	3 – 1	Ryan Meikle 93.89	1 – 3	3 – 0	3 – 2	3 – 0	—N/a

Wednesday, 21 December

Match #	Round	Player 1	Score	Player 2	Set 1	Set 2	Set 3	Set 4	Set 5
Afternoon session 12:30 (GMT)
41	1	John O'Shea 81.08	2 – 3	Darius Labanauskas 83.78	3 – 2	3 – 2	1 – 3	2 – 3	1 – 3
42	1	Martijn Kleermaker 86.28	3 – 0	Xicheng Han 77.73	3 – 0	3 – 1	3 – 1	—N/a	
43	2	Callan Rydz 88.10	0 – 3	Josh Rock 92.27	2 – 3	1 – 3	1 – 3	—N/a	
44	2	Dave Chisnall 97.87	3 – 1	Andrew Gilding 95.01	0 – 3	3 – 0	3 – 2	3 – 2	—N/a
Evening session 19:00 (GMT)
45	2	Mervyn King 93.74	3 – 2	Danny Baggish 88.01	3 – 2	3 – 2	2 – 3	1 – 3	3 – 1
46	2	Gabriel Clemens 95.64	3 – 0	William O'Connor 91.86	3 – 2	3 – 2	3 – 0	—N/a	
47	2	Michael van Gerwen 101.84	3 – 0	Lewy Williams 81.79	3 – 1	3 – 0	3 – 0	—N/a	
48	2	Stephen Bunting 91.35	3 – 1	Leonard Gates 87.09	2 – 3	3 – 1	3 – 1	3 – 1	—N/a

Thursday, 22 December

Match #	Round	Player 1	Score	Player 2	Set 1	Set 2	Set 3	Set 4	Set 5
Afternoon session 12:30 (GMT)
49	2	Krzysztof Ratajski 88.61	3 – 1	Danny Jansen 81.97	3 – 1	0 – 3	3 – 1	3 – 1	—N/a
50	2	Ryan Searle 88.60	3 – 0	Adam Gawlas 82.04	3 – 2	3 – 1	3 – 2	—N/a	
51	2	Mensur Suljović 88.65	3 – 0	Mike De Decker 85.63	3 – 1	3 – 2	3 – 1	—N/a	
52	2	Dirk van Duijvenbode 95.18	3 – 2	Karel Sedláček 88.26	3 – 1	1 – 3	2 – 3	3 – 1	4 – 2
Evening session 19:00 (GMT)
53	2	Gary Anderson 96.39	3 – 1	Madars Razma 90.96	3 – 2	2 – 3	3 – 2	3 – 2	—N/a
54	2	James Wade 91.01	2 – 3	Jim Williams 90.49	3 – 1	1 – 3	0 – 3	3 – 0	1 – 3
55	2	Luke Humphries 90.95	3 – 2	Florian Hempel 86.47	2 – 3	3 – 0	1 – 3	3 – 0	3 – 1
56	2	Vincent van der Voort 90.78	3 – 0	Cameron Menzies 88.31	3 – 0	3 – 1	3 – 2	—N/a	

Friday, 23 December

Match #	Round	Player 1	Score	Player 2	Set 1	Set 2	Set 3	Set 4	Set 5
Afternoon session 12:30 (GMT)
57	2	Brendan Dolan 87.85	3 – 1	Jimmy Hendriks 83.36	3 – 1	3 – 0	2 – 3	3 – 0	—N/a
58	2	Chris Dobey 86.74	3 – 0	Martijn Kleermaker 85.23	3 – 2	3 – 1	3 – 2	—N/a	
59	2	Ross Smith 100.97	3 – 1	Darius Labanauskas 93.85	3 – 2	3 – 0	2 – 3	3 – 2	—N/a
60	2	Rob Cross 99.32	3 – 1	Scott Williams 96.98	2 – 3	3 – 2	3 – 2	3 – 2	—N/a
Evening session 19:00 (GMT)
61	2	Martin Schindler 93.04	3 – 1	Martin Lukeman 94.52	3 – 2	2 – 3	3 – 1	3 – 1	—N/a
62	2	Danny Noppert 95.03	3 – 1	David Cameron 90.26	3 – 1	3 – 1	2 – 3	3 – 1	—N/a
63	2	Jonny Clayton 99.62	3 – 0	Danny van Trijp 83.30	3 – 1	3 – 1	3 – 1	—N/a	
64	2	Joe Cullen 95.03	3 – 1	Ricky Evans 90.82	3 – 1	3 – 2	2 – 3	3 – 1	—N/a

Tuesday, 27 December

Match #	Round	Player 1	Score	Player 2	Set 1	Set 2	Set 3	Set 4	Set 5	Set 6	Set 7
Afternoon session 12:30 (GMT)
65	3	Dimitri Van den Bergh 92.92	4 – 1	Krzysztof Ratajski 92.38	3 – 2	3 – 0	0 – 3	3 – 1	3 – 1	—N/a	
66	3	Nathan Aspinall 98.19	3 – 4	Josh Rock 95.92	2 – 3	3 – 1	3 – 1	1 – 3	2 – 3	3 – 0	1 – 3
67	3	Jonny Clayton 93.76	4 – 1	Brendan Dolan 94.07	3 – 2	3 – 2	3 – 2	2 – 3	3 – 2	—N/a	
Evening session 19:00 (GMT)
68	3	Jim Williams 98.45	3 – 4	Gabriel Clemens 97.55	1 – 3	3 – 0	2 – 3	3 – 2	3 – 1	2 – 3	1 – 3
69	3	Gerwyn Price 93.68	4 – 0	Raymond van Barneveld 92.64	3 – 1	3 – 1	3 – 2	3 – 1	—N/a		
70	3	Peter Wright 91.28	1 – 4	Kim Huybrechts 91.50	3 – 0	0 – 3	1 – 3	2 – 3	2 – 3	—N/a	

Wednesday, 28 December

Match #	Round	Player 1	Score	Player 2	Set 1	Set 2	Set 3	Set 4	Set 5	Set 6	Set 7
Afternoon session 12:30 (GMT)
71	3	Ryan Searle 87.51	3 – 4	José de Sousa 91.75	3 – 1	3 – 2	3 – 1	2 – 3	2 – 3	1 – 3	1 – 3
72	3	Danny Noppert 90.42	2 – 4	Alan Soutar 93.38	3 – 1	3 – 0	1 – 3	0 – 3	1 – 3	0 – 3	—N/a
73	3	Gary Anderson 93.87	1 – 4	Chris Dobey 95.34	3 – 0	2 – 3	2 – 3	2 – 3	1 – 3	—N/a	
Evening session 19:00 (GMT)
74	3	Joe Cullen 98.09	4 – 0	Damon Heta 94.00	3 – 2	3 – 1	3 – 2	3 – 0	—N/a		
75	3	Michael van Gerwen 107.66	4 – 2	Mensur Suljović 98.90	3 – 2	3 – 2	1 – 3	3 – 2	2 – 3	3 – 1	—N/a
76	3	Michael Smith 95.36	4 – 3	Martin Schindler 94.97	2 – 3	3 – 0	2 – 3	1 – 3	3 – 2	3 – 1	3 – 1

Thursday, 29 December

Match #	Round	Player 1	Score	Player 2	Set 1	Set 2	Set 3	Set 4	Set 5	Set 6	Set 7
Afternoon session 12:30 (GMT)
77	3	Dirk van Duijvenbode 93.44	4 – 3	Ross Smith 96.95	3 – 1	1 – 3	3 – 0	1 – 3	2 – 3	3 – 2	6 – 5
78	3	Rob Cross 99.13	4 – 1	Mervyn King 92.10	3 – 0	3 – 0	3 – 1	1 – 3	3 – 1	—N/a	
79	3	Dave Chisnall 101.82	2 – 4	Stephen Bunting 102.24	3 – 1	0 – 3	0 – 3	3 – 2	1 – 3	2 – 3	—N/a
Evening session 19:00 (GMT)
80	3	Luke Humphries 96.48	4 – 3	Vincent van der Voort 92.68	3 – 1	3 – 1	2 – 3	1 – 3	3 – 2	2 – 3	3 – 0
81	4	Gerwyn Price 94.43	4 – 1	José de Sousa 91.92	3 – 1	3 – 2	1 – 3	3 – 2	3 – 2	—N/a	
82	4	Jonny Clayton 97.73	4 – 3	Josh Rock 96.97	0 – 3	3 – 1	3 – 1	2 – 3	2 – 3	3 – 1	3 – 0

Friday, 30 December

Match #	Round	Player 1	Score	Player 2	Set 1	Set 2	Set 3	Set 4	Set 5	Set 6	Set 7
Afternoon session 12:30 (GMT)
83	4	Kim Huybrechts 87.13	0 – 4	Dimitri Van den Bergh 95.59	0 – 3	2 – 3	1 – 3	0 – 3	—N/a		
84	4	Gabriel Clemens 93.96	4 – 1	Alan Soutar 91.92	3 – 0	1 – 3	3 – 0	3 – 2	3 – 2	—N/a	
85	4	Michael Smith 103.25	4 – 1	Joe Cullen 93.86	3 – 2	0 – 3	3 – 0	3 – 2	3 – 2	—N/a	
Evening session 19:00 (GMT)
86	4	Rob Cross 100.02	2 – 4	Chris Dobey 102.13	3 – 1	0 – 3	3 – 0	2 – 3	1 – 3	2 – 3	—N/a
87	4	Michael van Gerwen 100.42	4 – 1	Dirk van Duijvenbode 89.77	3 – 1	3 – 1	1 – 3	3 – 2	3 – 0	—N/a	
88	4	Luke Humphries 89.92	1 – 4	Stephen Bunting 99.43	1 – 3	0 – 3	3 – 1	2 – 3	0 – 3	—N/a	

Sunday, 1 January

Match #	Round	Player 1	Score	Player 2	Set 1	Set 2	Set 3	Set 4	Set 5	Set 6	Set 7	Set 8	Set 9
Afternoon session 12:30 (GMT)
89	QF	Dimitri Van den Bergh 95.49	5 – 3	Jonny Clayton 93.92	0 – 3	3 – 0	1 – 3	3 – 0	2 – 3	3 – 2	3 – 1	3 – 2	—N/a
90	QF	Michael Smith 91.63	5 – 3	Stephen Bunting 97.16	3 – 2	0 – 3	3 – 1	3 – 1	3 – 0	0 – 3	1 – 3	3 – 1	—N/a
Evening session 19:30 (GMT)
91	QF	Gerwyn Price 94.58	1 – 5	Gabriel Clemens 99.94	3 – 0	1 – 3	1 – 3	1 – 3	1 – 3	0 – 3	—N/a		
92	QF	Michael van Gerwen 102.39	5 – 0	Chris Dobey 90.81	3 – 1	3 – 1	3 – 0	3 – 0	3 – 1	—N/a			

Monday, 2 January

Match #	Round	Player 1	Score	Player 2	Set 1	Set 2	Set 3	Set 4	Set 5	Set 6	Set 7	Set 8	Set 9	Set 10	Set 11
Evening session 19:30 (GMT)
93	SF	Gabriel Clemens 96.98	2 – 6	Michael Smith 101.85	2 – 3	3 – 2	2 – 3	3 – 2	0 – 3	2 – 3	2 – 3	1 – 3	—N/a		
94	SF	Dimitri Van den Bergh 96.46	0 – 6	Michael van Gerwen 108.28	2 – 3	0 – 3	0 – 3	2 – 3	0 – 3	0 – 3	—N/a				

Tuesday, 3 January

Match #	Round	Player 1	Score	Player 2	Set 1	Set 2	Set 3	Set 4	Set 5	Set 6	Set 7	Set 8	Set 9	Set 10	Set 11	Set 12	Set 13
Evening session 20:00 (GMT)
95	F	Michael Smith 100.87	7 – 4	Michael van Gerwen 99.58	1 – 3	3 – 1	3 – 1	0 – 3	2 – 3	3 – 1	3 – 2	3 – 1	3 – 0	2 – 3	3 – 2	—N/a	

== Draw ==
External videos
- YouTube stream of draw

The draw of the tournament was made by Wayne Mardle and Mark Webster live on Sky Sports News and streamed via YouTube on 28 November 2022.

=== Final ===
Best of 13 sets Referee: Kirk Bevins; Alexandra Palace, London, England, 3 January 2023
Michael Smith	7 – 4	Michael van Gerwen
1–3, 3–1, 3–1, 0–3, 2–3, 3–1, 3–2, 3–1, 3–0, 2–3, 3–2
100.87	Average (3 darts)	99.58
50	100+ scores	50
31	140+ scores	28
22	180 scores	15
141	Highest checkout	105
3	100+ Checkouts	2
26/55 (47.3%)	Checkout summary	20/52 (38.5%)

=== Finals ===
Quarter-finals (best of 9 sets); 1 January
1	Gerwyn Price 94.58	1
25	Gabriel Clemens 99.94	5
4	Michael Smith 91.63	5
21	Stephen Bunting 97.16	3
15	Dimitri Van den Bergh 95.49	5
7	Jonny Clayton 93.92	3
3	Michael van Gerwen 102.39	5
22	Chris Dobey 90.81	0

Semi-finals (best of 11 sets); 2 January
25	Gabriel Clemens 96.98	2
4	Michael Smith 101.85	6
15	Dimitri Van den Bergh 96.46	0
3	Michael van Gerwen 108.28	6

Final (best of 13 sets); 3 January
4	Michael Smith 100.87	7
3	Michael van Gerwen 99.58	4

=== Top half ===
==== Section 1 ====
First round (best of 5 sets); 15–21 December
Luke Woodhouse 87.89	3
Q	Vladyslav Omelchenko 80.51	0
Ryan Meikle 91.88	3
Q	Lisa Ashton 84.04	2
Adam Gawlas 84.86	3
Q	Richie Burnett 85.12	2
Simon Whitlock 87.25	3
Q	Christian Perez 85.81	2
Jim Williams 91.09	3
Q	Sebastian Białecki 90.32	2
William O'Connor 94.26	3
Q	Beau Greaves 88.34	0
Ritchie Edhouse 87.34	2
Q	David Cameron 87.86	3
Alan Soutar 86.98	3
Q	Mal Cuming 78.23	0

Second round (best of 5 sets); 15–23 December
1	Gerwyn Price 92.88	3
Luke Woodhouse 89.05	1
32	Raymond van Barneveld 95.18	3
Ryan Meikle 93.89	1
16	Ryan Searle 88.60	3
Adam Gawlas 82.04	0
17	José de Sousa 86.75	3
Simon Whitlock 86.23	2
8	James Wade 91.01	2
Jim Williams 90.49	3
25	Gabriel Clemens 95.64	3
William O'Connor 91.86	0
9	Danny Noppert 95.03	3
Q	David Cameron 90.26	1
24	Daryl Gurney 91.25	0
Alan Soutar 92.29	3

Third round (best of 7 sets); 27–29 December
1	Gerwyn Price 93.68	4
32	Raymond van Barneveld 92.64	0
16	Ryan Searle 87.51	3
17	José de Sousa 91.75	4
Jim Williams 98.45	3
25	Gabriel Clemens 97.55	4
9	Danny Noppert 90.42	2
Alan Soutar 93.38	4

Fourth round (best of 7 sets); 29–30 December
1	Gerwyn Price 94.43	4
17	José de Sousa 91.92	1
25	Gabriel Clemens 93.96	4
Alan Soutar 91.92	1

Quarter-finals (best of 9 sets); 1 January
1	Gerwyn Price 94.58	1
25	Gabriel Clemens 99.94	5

==== Section 2 ====
First round (best of 5 sets); 15–21 December
Jermaine Wattimena 88.46	2
Q	Nathan Rafferty 87.63	3
Martin Lukeman 87.00	3
Q	Nobuhiro Yamamoto 83.25	0
Ricky Evans 89.32	3
Q	Fallon Sherrock 89.71	1
Adrian Lewis 93.57	3
Q	Daniel Larsson 83.87	0
Keegan Brown 91.54	2
Q	Florian Hempel 88.55	3
Cameron Menzies 85.92	3
Q	Diogo Portela 83.03	1
Andrew Gilding 88.43	3
Q	Robert Owen 86.52	2
Geert Nentjes 78.35	1
Q	Leonard Gates 81.21	3

Second round (best of 5 sets); 15–23 December
4	Michael Smith 96.62	3
Q	Nathan Rafferty 82.39	0
29	Martin Schindler 93.04	3
Martin Lukeman 94.52	1
13	Joe Cullen 95.03	3
Ricky Evans 90.82	1
20	Damon Heta 96.17	3
Adrian Lewis 82.96	0
5	Luke Humphries 90.95	3
Q	Florian Hempel 86.47	2
28	Vincent van der Voort 90.78	3
Cameron Menzies 88.31	0
12	Dave Chisnall 97.87	3
Andrew Gilding 95.01	1
21	Stephen Bunting 91.35	3
Q	Leonard Gates 87.09	1

Third round (best of 7 sets); 27–29 December
4	Michael Smith 95.36	4
29	Martin Schindler 94.97	3
13	Joe Cullen 98.09	4
20	Damon Heta 94.00	0
5	Luke Humphries 96.48	4
28	Vincent van der Voort 92.68	3
12	Dave Chisnall 101.82	2
21	Stephen Bunting 102.24	4

Fourth round (best of 7 sets); 29–30 December
4	Michael Smith 103.25	4
13	Joe Cullen 93.86	1
5	Luke Humphries 89.92	1
21	Stephen Bunting 99.43	4

Quarter-finals (best of 9 sets); 1 January
4	Michael Smith 91.63	5
21	Stephen Bunting 97.16	3

=== Bottom half ===
==== Section 3 ====
First round (best of 5 sets); 15–21 December
Mickey Mansell 92.49	3
Q	Ben Robb 89.13	1
Keane Barry 78.35	1
Q	Grant Sampson 77.29	3
Rowby-John Rodriguez 91.30	2
Q	Lourence Ilagan 87.98	3
Danny Jansen 83.42	3
Q	Paolo Nebrida 82.75	2
Steve Beaton 85.23	0
Q	Danny van Trijp 87.06	3
Jamie Hughes 79.78	1
Q	Jimmy Hendriks 78.33	3
Boris Krčmar 78.21	3
Q	Toru Suzuki 78.43	0
Josh Rock 93.36	3
Q	José Justicia 85.66	1

Second round (best of 5 sets); 15–23 December
2	Peter Wright 88.34	3
Mickey Mansell 77.50	0
31	Kim Huybrechts 83.37	3
Q	Grant Sampson 68.97	0
15	Dimitri Van den Bergh 94.69	3
Q	Lourence Ilagan 79.60	0
18	Krzysztof Ratajski 88.61	3
Danny Jansen 81.97	1
7	Jonny Clayton 99.62	3
Q	Danny van Trijp 83.30	0
26	Brendan Dolan 87.85	3
Q	Jimmy Hendriks 83.36	1
10	Nathan Aspinall 97.80	3
Boris Krčmar 91.88	1
23	Callan Rydz 88.10	0
Josh Rock 92.27	3

Third round (best of 7 sets); 27–29 December
2	Peter Wright 91.28	1
31	Kim Huybrechts 91.50	4
15	Dimitri Van den Bergh 92.92	4
18	Krzysztof Ratajski 92.38	1
7	Jonny Clayton 93.76	4
26	Brendan Dolan 94.07	1
10	Nathan Aspinall 98.19	3
Josh Rock 95.92	4

Fourth round (best of 7 sets); 29–30 December
31	Kim Huybrechts 87.13	0
15	Dimitri Van den Bergh 95.59	4
7	Jonny Clayton 97.73	4
Josh Rock 96.97	3

Quarter-finals (best of 9 sets); 1 January
15	Dimitri Van den Bergh 95.49	5
7	Jonny Clayton 93.92	3

==== Section 4 ====
First round (best of 5 sets); 15–21 December
Niels Zonneveld 86.88	0
Q	Lewy Williams 92.81	3
Mike De Decker 88.56	3
Q	Jeff Smith 92.09	1
Karel Sedláček 98.72	3
Q	Raymond Smith 92.40	0
John O'Shea 81.08	2
Q	Darius Labanauskas 83.78	3
Scott Williams 100.32	3
Q	Ryan Joyce 103.04	1
Matt Campbell 93.58	0
Q	Danny Baggish 92.96	3
Madars Razma 89.30	3
Q	Prakash Jiwa 86.19	1
Martijn Kleermaker 86.28	3
Q	Xicheng Han 77.73	0

Second round (best of 5 sets); 15–23 December
3	Michael van Gerwen 101.84	3
Q	Lewy Williams 81.79	0
30	Mensur Suljović 88.65	3
Mike De Decker 85.63	0
14	Dirk van Duijvenbode 95.18	3
Karel Sedláček 88.26	2
19	Ross Smith 100.97	3
Q	Darius Labanauskas 93.85	1
6	Rob Cross 99.32	3
Scott Williams 96.98	1
27	Mervyn King 93.74	3
Q	Danny Baggish 88.01	2
11	Gary Anderson 96.39	3
Madars Razma 90.96	1
22	Chris Dobey 86.74	3
Martijn Kleermaker 85.23	0

Third round (best of 7 sets); 27–29 December
3	Michael van Gerwen 107.66	4
30	Mensur Suljović 98.90	2
14	Dirk van Duijvenbode 93.44	4
19	Ross Smith 96.95	3
6	Rob Cross 99.13	4
27	Mervyn King 92.10	1
11	Gary Anderson 93.87	1
22	Chris Dobey 95.34	4

Fourth round (best of 7 sets); 29–30 December
3	Michael van Gerwen 100.42	4
14	Dirk van Duijvenbode 89.77	1
6	Rob Cross 100.02	2
22	Chris Dobey 102.13	4

Quarter-finals (best of 9 sets); 1 January
3	Michael van Gerwen 102.39	5
22	Chris Dobey 90.81	0

== Statistics ==
=== Highest averages ===
This table shows all averages over 100 achieved by players throughout the tournament. In the case one player has multiple records, this is indicated by the number in brackets.

The three-dart average is the most cited statistic in darts matches as it gives a rough estimate of a player's form. An average of 100 is regarded as a benchmark for a world class performance. For comparison with previous years, see the highest ever recorded averages in the World Darts Championship.

#	Player	Round	Average	Result
1	Michael van Gerwen	SF	108.28	Won
2	Michael van Gerwen (2)	R3	107.66	Won
3	Michael Smith	R4	103.25	Won
4	Ryan Joyce	R1	103.04	Lost
5	Michael van Gerwen (3)	QF	102.39	Won
6	Stephen Bunting	R3	102.24	Won
7	Chris Dobey	R4	102.13	Won
8	Michael Smith (2)	SF	101.85	Won
9	Michael van Gerwen (4)	R2	101.84	Won
10	Dave Chisnall	R3	101.82	Lost
11	Ross Smith	R2	100.97	Won
12	Michael Smith (3)	F	100.87	Won
13	Michael van Gerwen (5)	R4	100.42	Won
14	Scott Williams	R1	100.32	Won
15	Rob Cross	R4	100.02	Lost

== Broadcasting rights ==
In the United Kingdom and Republic of Ireland, the event was broadcast by Sky Sports as part of a seven-year contract signed in 2017 with the PDC. Sky Sports' coverage was fronted by Emma Paton, who replaced Laura Woods in the role following her departure to ITV Sport earlier in 2022. Pundits for the event included former world champions John Part and Mark Webster, plus Wayne Mardle and Laura Turner. The championship was the first since the deaths of long-time Sky Sports commentators John Gwynne and Nigel Pearson. As part of a two-year contract extension signed in 2021, the tournament was also broadcast via radio station Talksport, with former players Paul Nicholson and Chris Mason among the commentary team.

In Netherlands, the tournament was aired on subscription streaming service Viaplay. German coverage was aired on Sport1, and achieved a record viewership for darts in Germany for Gabriel Clemens' semi-final.

=== Television ===
Country	Broadcaster
Australia	Fox Sports
Austria; Germany; Switzerland	Sport1, DAZN
Belgium	VTM 2, VTM 4
Brazil; Canada; Italy; Japan; Spain; United States	DAZN
Croatia	SPTV
Czech Republic; Slovakia	Nova Sport 2
Denmark; Estonia; Finland; Iceland; Latvia; Lithuania; Netherlands; Norway; Sweden	Viaplay
Hungary	SportTV
New Zealand	Sky Sport
Philippines	Setanta Sports
Poland	TVP Sport
South Africa	SuperSport
United Kingdom; Ireland	Sky Sports Darts
