= 2023 PDC World Cup of Darts =

Tournament information
- Dates: 16–19 June 2023
- Venue: Eissporthalle
- Location: Frankfurt, Germany
- Organisation(s): Professional Darts Corporation (PDC)
- Format: Legs
- Prize fund: £450,000
- Winner's share: £80,000
- High checkout: 144 Krzysztof Ratajski

Champion(s)
- Wales (Gerwyn Price and Jonny Clayton)

The 2023 PDC World Cup of Darts, known as the 2023 My Diesel Claim World Cup of Darts for sponsorship reasons, was the thirteenth edition of the PDC World Cup of Darts. It took place from 16 to 19 June 2023 at the Eissporthalle in Frankfurt, Germany.

Australia (Damon Heta and Simon Whitlock) were the defending champions, after beating Wales (Gerwyn Price and Jonny Clayton) 3–1 in the 2022 final, but they were eliminated in the quarter finals, losing 7–8 to Belgium .

Wales won the tournament for the second time, defeating Scotland (Peter Wright and Gary Anderson) 10–2 in the final.

== Format ==
A new format was introduced for 2023, with an expansion to 40 teams. The top four teams are seeded to the second round, with the other 36 competing in a group stage of twelve groups of three, with one qualifying from each group.

In the new format all rounds consist of a doubles match, removing singles matches, which had been a part of World Cups in previous years, entirely.

Group stage: Best of seven legs.
Second round, quarter and semi-finals: Best of fifteen legs.
Final: Best of nineteen legs

== Prize money ==
Total prize money was increased to £450,000 from the previous £350,000, with the winning prize going up to £80,000 from £70,000.

The prize money per team was:

Position (no. of teams)		Prize money (Total: £450,000)
Winners	(1)	£80,000
Runners-Up	(1)	£50,000
Semi-finalists	(2)	£30,000
Quarter-finalists	(4)	£20,000
Last 16 (Second round)	(8)	£9,000
Second in group	(12)	£5,000
Third in group	(12)	£4,000

== Teams and seedings ==
The top four nations based on combined Order of Merit rankings are seeded to the second round, while the next twelve nations are seeded in the group stage.

On 22 February 2023, a Latin America qualifier was announced to determine a representative team from that region.

The top two players from nations represented by the PDC Order of Merit were confirmed on 29 May; the top players from nations on the PDC Asian Tour were confirmed on 1 May, and the top players from the Nordic & Baltic regions were confirmed on 5 June.

The expansion sees Bahrain, Guyana, Iceland and Ukraine enter for the first time, while Croatia will compete for the first time since 2013, France for the first time since 2014, India for the first time since 2015, Thailand for the first time since 2018, and China return having missed the 2022 tournament.

Following the first round draw, Michael van Gerwen withdrew due to a dental operation, and was replaced with Dirk van Duijvenbode. This resulted in Wales moving ahead of the Netherlands in the seedings.

The teams and players were as follows:

Seeded nations (top four to second round)

Rank	Country	Players
1	England	Michael Smith and Rob Cross
2	Wales	Gerwyn Price and Jonny Clayton
3	Netherlands	Danny Noppert and Dirk van Duijvenbode
4	Scotland	Peter Wright and Gary Anderson
5	Belgium	Dimitri Van den Bergh and Kim Huybrechts
6	Germany	Gabriel Clemens and Martin Schindler
7	Australia	Damon Heta and Simon Whitlock
8	Northern Ireland	Brendan Dolan and Daryl Gurney
9	Ireland	William O'Connor and Keane Barry
10	Austria	Mensur Suljović and Rowby-John Rodriguez
11	Poland	Krzysztof Ratajski and Krzysztof Kciuk
12	Canada	Matt Campbell and Jeff Smith
13	Czech Republic	Adam Gawlas and Karel Sedláček
14	Spain	José Justicia and Tony Martinez
15	Latvia	Madars Razma and Dmitrijs Žukovs
16	Switzerland	Stefan Bellmont and Marcel Walpen

Unseeded nations

Country	Players
Bahrain	Bassim Mahmood and Abdulnaser Yusuf
China	Xiaochen Zong and Lihao Wen
Croatia	Boris Krčmar and Romeo Grbavac
Denmark	Vladimir Andersen and Benjamin Drue Reus
Finland	Marko Kantele and Paavo Myller
France	Thibault Tricole and Jacques Labre
Gibraltar	Craig Galliano and Justin Hewitt
Guyana	Sudesh Fitzgerald and Norman Madhoo
Hong Kong	Man Lok Leung and Lee Lok Yin
Hungary	Patrik Kovács and Levente Sárai
Iceland	Vitor Charrua and Hallgrímur Egilsson
India	Prakash Jiwa and Amit Gilitwala
Italy	Massimo Dante and Michele Turetta
Japan	Jun Matsuda and Tomoya Goto
Lithuania	Darius Labanauskas and Mindaugas Barauskas
New Zealand	Ben Robb and Warren Parry
Philippines	Christian Perez and Lourence Ilagan
Portugal	José de Sousa and Luis Ameixa
Singapore	Paul Lim and Harith Lim
South Africa	Devon Petersen and Vernon Bouwers
Sweden	Dennis Nilsson and Oskar Lukasiak
Thailand	Thanawat Gaweenuntawong and Attapol Eupakaree
Ukraine	Vladyslav Omelchenko and Ilya Pekaruk
United States	Jules van Dongen and Leonard Gates

== Group stage ==
All group matches are best of 7 legs
After three games, the team that finishes top in each group qualify for the knock-out stage
If teams were tied on points after all the matches were completed, the ties were broken based on leg difference

NB: P = Played; W = Won; L = Lost; LF = Legs for; LA = Legs against; LD = Leg difference; Pts = Points

=== Group A ===
Pos	Team	Pld	W	L	LF	LA	LD	Pts	Status
1	Belgium (5)	2	2	0	8	3	+5	4	Q
2	Finland	2	1	1	4	4	0	2	E
3	China	2	0	2	3	8	−5	0	E

15 June

Belgium 91.09	4–0	Finland 74.00

16 June

Finland 79.11	4–0	China 77.76
Belgium 94.37	4–3	China 80.94

=== Group B ===
Pos	Team	Pld	W	L	LF	LA	LD	Pts	Status
1	Germany (6)	2	2	0	8	0	+8	4	Q
2	Japan	2	1	1	4	7	−3	2	E
3	Hong Kong	2	0	2	3	8	−5	0	E

15 June

Germany 93.94	4–0	Hong Kong 80.85

16 June

Hong Kong 82.32	3–4	Japan 77.75
Germany 84.68	4–0	Japan 70.61

=== Group C ===
Pos	Team	Pld	W	L	LF	LA	LD	Pts	Status
1	Australia (7)	2	2	0	8	0	+8	4	Q
2	Gibraltar	2	1	1	4	5	−1	2	E
3	Guyana	2	0	2	1	8	−7	0	E

15 June

Australia 81.24	4–0	Guyana 69.46

16 June

Guyana 62.86	1–4	Gibraltar 74.29
Australia 88.41	4–0	Gibraltar 75.36

=== Group D ===
Pos	Team	Pld	W	L	LF	LA	LD	Pts	Status
1	France	2	2	0	8	1	+7	4	Q
2	Northern Ireland (8)	2	1	1	5	4	+1	2	E
3	Ukraine	2	0	2	0	8	−8	0	E

15 June

Northern Ireland 81.83	1–4	France 83.09

16 June

Northern Ireland 96.97	4–0	Ukraine 60.75
France 81.24	4–0	Ukraine 73.60

=== Group E ===
Pos	Team	Pld	W	L	LF	LA	LD	Pts	Status
1	Croatia	2	2	0	8	4	+4	4	Q
2	Ireland (9)	2	1	1	5	5	0	2	E
3	Thailand	2	0	2	4	8	−4	0	E

15 June

Ireland 84.31	4–1	Thailand 76.17

16 June

Thailand 71.66	3–4	Croatia 77.57
Ireland 81.97	1–4	Croatia 85.13

=== Group F ===
Pos	Team	Pld	W	L	LF	LA	LD	Pts	Status
1	Denmark	2	1	1	7	6	+1	2	Q
2	Austria (10)	2	1	1	6	6	0	2	E
3	United States	2	1	1	6	7	−1	2	E

15 June

Austria 91.74	2–4	Denmark 90.94

16 June

Austria 88.40	4–2	United States 80.91
Denmark 81.77	3–4	United States 85.89

=== Group G ===
Pos	Team	Pld	W	L	LF	LA	LD	Pts	Status
1	Poland (11)	2	2	0	8	4	+4	4	Q
2	Lithuania	2	1	1	5	5	0	2	E
3	Portugal	2	0	2	4	8	−4	0	E

15 June

Poland 80.37	4–3	Portugal 81.20

16 June

Portugal 79.70	1–4	Lithuania 88.04
Poland 118.10	4–1	Lithuania 86.75

=== Group H ===
Pos	Team	Pld	W	L	LF	LA	LD	Pts	Status
1	Canada (12)	2	2	0	8	3	+5	4	Q
2	Hungary	2	1	1	5	4	+1	2	E
3	India	2	0	2	2	8	−6	0	E

15 June

Canada 81.94	4–2	India 72.42

16 June

India 71.80	0–4	Hungary 76.10
Canada 89.82	4–1	Hungary 87.76

=== Group I ===
Pos	Team	Pld	W	L	LF	LA	LD	Pts	Status
1	Philippines	2	2	0	8	2	+6	4	Q
2	Czech Republic (13)	2	1	1	5	6	−1	2	E
3	Singapore	2	0	2	3	8	−5	0	E

15 June

Czech Republic 88.65	4–2	Singapore 85.16

16 June

Singapore 78.38	1–4	Philippines 82.70
Czech Republic 75.00	1–4	Philippines 86.03

=== Group J ===
Pos	Team	Pld	W	L	LF	LA	LD	Pts	Status
1	South Africa	2	2	0	8	4	+4	4	Q
2	Spain (14)	2	1	1	6	6	0	2	E
3	Iceland	2	0	2	4	8	−4	0	E

15 June

Spain 82.69	2–4	South Africa 84.69

16 June

Spain 78.05	4–2	Iceland 69.56
South Africa 89.16	4–2	Iceland 66.64

=== Group K ===
Pos	Team	Pld	W	L	LF	LA	LD	Pts	Status
1	Latvia (15)	2	2	0	8	4	+4	4	Q
2	New Zealand	2	1	1	6	5	+1	2	E
3	Bahrain	2	0	2	3	8	−5	0	E

15 June

Latvia 87.82	4–2	New Zealand 83.13

16 June

New Zealand 83.90	4–1	Bahrain 63.10
Latvia 86.79	4–2	Bahrain 71.73

=== Group L ===
Pos	Team	Pld	W	L	LF	LA	LD	Pts	Status
1	Sweden	2	2	0	8	4	+4	4	Q
2	Italy	2	1	1	7	7	0	2	E
3	Switzerland (16)	2	0	2	4	8	−4	0	E

15 June

Switzerland 76.66	3–4	Italy 78.53

16 June

Switzerland 82.79	1–4	Sweden 79.92
Italy 78.22	3–4	Sweden 88.02

== Knockout stage ==
Second round (best of 15 legs); 17 June
1	England 93.50	8
15	Latvia 83.98	4
11	Poland 89.67	6
6	Germany 87.31	8
4	Scotland 89.01	8
Philippines 87.91	5
France 83.43	8
South Africa 75.99	4
2	Wales 99.97	8
Denmark 82.27	2
Sweden 91.44	8
12	Canada 87.66	5
3	Netherlands 93.20	7
5	Belgium 92.13	8
7	Australia 89.60	8
Croatia 85.65	6

Quarter-finals (best of 15 legs); 18 June
1	England 94.07	3
6	Germany 92.67	8
4	Scotland 89.07	8
France 80.59	0
2	Wales 92.34	8
Sweden 82.78	5
5	Belgium 92.52	8
7	Australia 95.12	7

Semi-finals (best of 15 legs); 18 June
6	Germany 84.45	5
4	Scotland 86.27	8
2	Wales 95.85	8
5	Belgium 92.25	7

Final (best of 19 legs); 18 June
4	Scotland 90.08	2
2	Wales 96.18	10
