= 2023 German Darts Grand Prix =

2023 Interwetten German Darts Grand Prix

Tournament information
- Dates: 8–10 April 2023
- Venue: Kulturhalle Zenith
- Location: Munich, Germany
- Organisation(s): Professional Darts Corporation (PDC)
- Format: Legs
- Prize fund: £175,000
- Winner's share: £30,000
- High checkout: 167; Jim Williams

Champion(s)
- Michael Smith

The 2023 German Darts Grand Prix, known as the 2023 Interwetten German Darts Grand Prix for sponsorship reasons, was a professional darts tournament that took place at the Kulturhalle Zenith in Munich, Germany from 8–10 April 2023. It was the fourth of thirteen European Tour events on the 2023 PDC Pro Tour. It featured a field of 48 players and £175,000 in prize money, with £30,000 going to the winner.

The defending champion was Luke Humphries, who defeated Martin Lukeman 8–2 in the 2022 final, however he lost 6–3 to Joe Cullen in the quarter-finals.

Michael Smith won his sixth European Tour title by defeating Nathan Aspinall 8–5 in the final.

== Prize money ==
The prize money was increased for the first time in 4 years for all European Tours:

Stage (num. of players)		Prize money
Winner	(1)	£30,000
Runner-up	(1)	£12,000
Semi-finalists	(2)	£8,500
Quarter-finalists	(4)	£6,000
Third round losers	(8)	£4,000
Second round losers	(16)	£2,500*
First round losers	(16)	£1,250
Total	£175,000	

- Seeded players who lost in the second round of the event were not credited with prize money on any Order of Merit. A player who qualified as a qualifier, but later became a seed due to the withdrawal of one or more other players was credited with their prize money on all Orders of Merit regardless of how far they progressed in the event.

== Qualification and format ==
The top 16 entrants from the PDC Pro Tour Order of Merit on 15 February 2023 automatically qualified for the event and were seeded in the second round.

The remaining 32 places went to players from six qualifying events – 24 from the Tour Card Holder Qualifier (held on 20 February), two from the Associate Member Qualifier (held on 11 February), the two highest ranked Germans automatically qualified, alongside two from the Host Nation Qualifier (held on 11 February), one from the Nordic & Baltic Associate Member Qualifier (held on 10 March), and one from the East European Associate Member Qualifier (held on 12 February).

The following players took part in the tournament:

Top 16

1. Luke Humphries (quarter-finals)
2. Damon Heta (semi-finals)
3. Rob Cross (second round)
4. Dave Chisnall (third round)
5. Nathan Aspinall (runner-up)
6. Michael Smith (champion)
7. Dirk van Duijvenbode (third round)
8. Peter Wright (second round)
9. Joe Cullen (semi-finals)
10. Danny Noppert (quarter-finals)
11. Gerwyn Price (third round)
12. Martin Schindler (second round)
13. Jonny Clayton (second round)
14. Josh Rock (second round)
15. Dimitri Van den Bergh (second round)
16. José de Sousa (third round)

Tour Card Qualifier
- Andrew Gilding (quarter-finals)
- Simon Whitlock (first round)
- Robert Owen (first round)
- Jim Williams (third round)
- Mario Vandenbogaerde (first round)
- Jeffrey de Zwaan (second round)
- Chris Dobey (third round)
- Ross Smith (second round)
- Keane Barry (quarter-finals)
- Jules van Dongen (first round)
- Ian White (first round)
- Cameron Menzies (second round)
- Scott Waites (first round)
- Steve Beaton (second round)
- Tony Martinez (first round)
- Matt Campbell (first round)
- Callan Rydz (second round)
- Vincent van der Voort (first round)
- Adam Warner (second round)
- Lee Evans (third round)
- Brendan Dolan (first round)
- Raymond van Barneveld (second round)
- Daryl Gurney (first round)
- Alan Soutar (first round)

Associate Member Qualifier
- Andy Boulton (first round)
- Berry van Peer (third round)

Highest Ranking Germans
- Gabriel Clemens (second round)
- Florian Hempel (first round)

Host Nation Qualifier
- Dragutin Horvat (second round)
- Liam Maendl-Lawrance (second round)

Nordic & Baltic Qualifier
- Oskar Lukasiak (first round)

East European Qualifier
- Tytus Kanik (first round)

== Draw ==
The draw was made on 7 April.

First round (best of 11 legs); 30 March
Brendan Dolan 91.59	5
Jeffrey de Zwaan 94.86	6
Simon Whitlock 88.41	5
Steve Beaton 88.10	6
Alan Soutar 84.44	2
Lee Evans 95.26	6
Ross Smith 101.03	6
Florian Hempel 87.80	1
Scott Waites 87.54	4
Dragutin Horvat 85.81	6
Andrew Gilding 89.67	6
Tytus Kanik 78.86	1
Daryl Gurney 83.45	4
Cameron Menzies 84.35	6
Jim Williams 95.25	6
Vincent van der Voort 93.36	3
Gabriel Clemens 94.62	6
Oskar Lukasiak 87.28	4
Chris Dobey 101.56	6
Tony Martinez 75.71	1
Matt Campbell 92.74	3
Callan Rydz 95.10	6
Robert Owen 85.60	5
Liam Maendl-Lawrance 82.20	6
Andy Boulton 89.85	3
Keane Barry 91.24	6
Jules van Dongen 83.97	1
Berry van Peer 97.21	6
Mario Vandenbogaerde 90.43	4
Adam Warner 90.90	6
Ian White 97.88	5
Raymond van Barneveld 102.49	6

Second round (best of 11 legs); 31 March
1	Luke Humphries 99.00	6
Jeffrey de Zwaan 85.32	2
16	José de Sousa 86.41	6
Steve Beaton 84.11	2
8	Peter Wright 91.16	1
Lee Evans 92.69	6
9	Joe Cullen 91.26	6
Ross Smith 100.69	5
4	Dave Chisnall 88.07	6
Dragutin Horvat 82.76	4
13	Jonny Clayton 91.14	1
Andrew Gilding 102.98	6
5	Nathan Aspinall 96.43	6
Cameron Menzies 95.44	3
12	Martin Schindler 84.39	1
Jim Williams 91.43	6
2	Damon Heta 89.13	6
Gabriel Clemens 87.27	3
15	Dimitri Van den Bergh 95.17	2
Chris Dobey 96.56	6
7	Dirk van Duijvenbode 95.49	6
Callan Rydz 90.38	3
10	Danny Noppert 92.27	6
Liam Maendl-Lawrance 90.18	5
3	Rob Cross 100.31	3
Keane Barry 97.10	6
14	Josh Rock 93.20	3
Berry van Peer 94.07	6
6	Michael Smith 85.60	6
Adam Warner 85.89	5
11	Gerwyn Price 100.02	6
Raymond van Barneveld 83.15	2

Third round (best of 11 legs); 1 April
1	Humphries 99.91	6
16	Sousa 97.04	2
Evans 88.89	3
9	Cullen 96.70	6
4	Chisnall 99.59	5
Gilding 99.54	6
5	Aspinall 92.03	6
Williams 94.57	3
2	Heta 98.30	6
Dobey 93.86	5
7	van Duijvenbode 98.89	2
10	Noppert 104.20	6
Barry 92.50	6
van Peer 98.42	5
6	M. Smith 107.97	6
11	Price 99.85	2

Quarter-finals (best of 11 legs); 1 April
1	Humphries 95.54	3
9	Cullen 92.34	6
Gilding 91.51	4
5	Aspinall 93.58	6
2	Heta 96.16	6
10	Noppert 93.98	3
Barry 99.21	4
6	M. Smith 94.17	6

Semi-finals (best of 13 legs); 1 April
9	Cullen 93.23	5
5	Aspinall 92.39	7
2	Heta 98.05	6
6	M. Smith 94.36	7

Final (best of 15 legs); 1 April
5	Aspinall 94.63	5
6	M. Smith 102.88	8
