= 2019 World Masters (darts) =

Tournament on the BDO/WDF calendar for 2018

One80 L-style World Masters

Tournament information
- Dates: 23–28 October
- Venue: Circus Tavern
- Location: Circus Tavern, Purfleet
- Country: England
- Organisation(s): BDO
- Format: Sets for men, Legs for women, boys and girls
- Prize fund: £70,500
- Winner's share: £25,000 (men) £5,000 (women)
- High checkout: 170 (England) Scott Waites (stage matches)

Champion(s)
- (Republic of Ireland) John O'Shea (men) (England) Lisa Ashton (women) (Republic of Ireland) Keane Barry (boys) (Republic of Ireland) Katie Sheldon (girls)

The 2019 One80 L-style World Masters was a major tournament on the BDO/WDF calendar for 2019. It took place from 23 to 28 October at the Circus Tavern in Purfleet, Essex, which hosted the PDC World Darts Championship from 1994 to 2007.

Adam Smith-Neale was the reigning men's champion after defeating Glen Durrant in the previous year's final by 6 sets to 4, but lost in the Last 128 to Hannes Schnier of Austria. John O'Shea won his first major title with a 6 sets to 4 win over Scott Waites. He became the third non-seeded World Master in three consecutive years. Lisa Ashton was the defending women's champion after defeating Casey Gallagher 4 legs to 2 in last year's women final. She defended her title successfully with a 5 to 4 legs final win over Anastasia Dobromyslova. The youth tournaments were won by Keane Barry and Katie Sheldon of the Republic of Ireland. It was the first time three Irish players won the Singles tournaments of the World Masters.

The tournament was beset with problems, including:

- Prizemoney was not announced in advance.
- The tournament format was changed shortly before the event and the top-16 seeds had to play from the first round instead of receiving a bye to the televised stages.
- Several players boycotted the event in protest at the above. Nick Kenny and Wayne Warren were among the seeds who didn't attend.
- Other players arrived but found they were not registered as they were not aware they had to register.
- The chairman admitted that the original draw was made with fake names, which he said was in case more players showed up.
- The draw was then redone. Brian Cathcart, who never attended the event, was still in the draw for the last-32.
- There was a shortage of scorers and volunteers had to be called for.
- Participants were asked to sign a contract affirming that they would not enter the 2020 PDC World Darts Championship or its qualifiers, otherwise prizemoney might be withheld or have to be repaid. Some refused to sign and played anyway.
- BDO chairman Des Jacklin announced that he would stand down after the 2020 BDO World Darts Championship held in January.

These irregularities led to the BDO, a founder member of the World Darts Federation, being demoted to associate status by the WDF.

The tournament was the last World Masters organised by the BDO after the collapse of the organisation in September 2020. Following the tournament, the World Darts Federation announced plans to launch the WDF World Masters in 2020, but due to the COVID-19 pandemic these plans were pushed back to 2021, and then 2022.

== Men's seeds ==
The seedings were finalised on 10 September. For the fourth consecutive year, there were 16 seeds (a decrease from 32 between 2012 and 2015), but with a change from last year, all seeds started playing in the Last 128.

1. (Netherlands) Wesley Harms (Last 64)
2. (Netherlands) Richard Veenstra (Last 32)
3. (Wales) Jim Williams (Last 128)
4. (England) Dave Parletti (Last 32)
5. (Netherlands) Willem Mandigers (Last 16)
6. (England) Scott Mitchell (Last 32)
7. (England) Adam Smith-Neale (Last 128)
8. (Scotland) Ryan Hogarth (Last 32)
9. (Belgium) Mario Vandenbogaerde (semi-finals)
10. (England) Scott Waites (runner-up)
11. (England) Andy Hamilton (Last 64)
12. (England) David Evans (Last 128)
13. (Scotland) Gary Stone (Last 16)
14. (Poland) Sebastian Steyer (Last 128)
15. (England) Martin Adams (Last 128)
16. (England) Simon Stainton (Last 16)

== Men's draw (last 32 onwards) ==
Last 32; 25 October (best of 5 sets)
(England) Graham Usher 85.02	3
(Norway) Stig Jarle Knudsen 75.99	0
16	(England) Simon Stainton 81.18	3
(Northern Ireland) Gareth Chambers 70.25	1
8	(Scotland) Ryan Hogarth 84.00	0
(Canada) Jeff Smith 87.99	3
9	(Belgium) Mario Vandenbogaerde 90.65	3
(Wales) Richard Eirig Rowlands 85.06	1
5	(Netherlands) Willem Mandigers 81.23	3
(Northern Ireland) Marty Moreland 78.29	0
(England) Justin Hood 81.96	1
(Republic of Ireland) John O'Shea 78.18	3
4	(England) Dave Parletti 82.57	2
(Northern Ireland) Neil Duff 87.85	3
13	(Scotland) Gary Stone 84.62	3
(England) John Mann 79.06	1
2	(Netherlands) Richard Veenstra 85.64	2
(Scotland) Craig Owens 87.26	3
(England) Carl Hamilton 92.65	3
(Slovenia) Benjamin Pratnemer 85.46	0
(England) Joe Davis 84.63	2
(England) Paul Hogan 89.88	3
10	(England) Scott Waites 88.41	3
(England) Nick Fullwell 82.63	0
6	(England) Scott Mitchell 91.84	2
(Wales) Michael Warburton 96.04	3
(Republic of Ireland) Keith Geraghty 85.48	3
(France) Thibault Tricole 81.42	1
(England) David Copley 74.53	0
(Republic of Ireland) Ciaran Teehan 80.52	3
(Netherlands) Roemer Mooijman 86.26	3
(England) Paul Harvey 79.11	1

Last 16; 26 October (best of 5 sets)
(England) Usher 95.28	3
16	(England) Stainton 90.16	1
(Canada) Smith 97.14	2
9	(Belgium) Vandenbogaerde 95.93	3
5	(Netherlands) Mandigers 90.45	1
(Republic of Ireland) O'Shea 97.25	3
(Northern Ireland) Duff 93.03	3
13	(Scotland) Stone 91.90	1
(Scotland) Owens 85.50	2
(England) C Hamilton 82.17	3
(England) Hogan 94.42	2
10	(England) Waites 95.48	3
(Wales) Warburton 87.97	3
(Republic of Ireland) Geraghty 79.48	2
(Republic of Ireland) Teehan 86.54	3
(Netherlands) Mooijman 84.07	1

Quarter-finals; 27 October (best of 7 sets)
(England) Usher 86.74	2
9	(Belgium) Vandenbogaerde 90.82	4
(Republic of Ireland) O'Shea 84.17	4
(Northern Ireland) Duff 86.00	1
(England) C Hamilton 77.70	0
10	(England) Waites 90.12	4
(Wales) Warburton 79.16	4
(Republic of Ireland) Teehan 77.39	2

Semi-finals; 27 October (best of 9 sets)
9	(Belgium) Vandenbogaerde 90.04	1
(Republic of Ireland) O'Shea 91.55	5
10	(England) Waites 91.28	5
(Wales) Warburton 81.96	1

Final; 27 October (best of 11 sets)
(Republic of Ireland) O'Shea 88.89	6
10	(England) Waites 86.24	4

== Women's seeds ==
It was announced before the start of the event that the Ladies seeds were to rise from 8 to 16. No reason for the change was given.

1. (England) Lisa Ashton (champion)
2. (Japan) Mikuru Suzuki (Last 32)
3. (Netherlands) Aileen de Graaf (Last 16)
4. (England) Deta Hedman (quarter-finals)
5. (England) Fallon Sherrock (Last 32)
6. (Russia) Anastasia Dobromyslova (runner-up)
7. (England) Lorraine Winstanley (semi-finals)
8. (England) Laura Turner (Last 64)
9. (England) Maria O'Brien (Last 16)
10. (England) Casey Gallagher (Last 16)
11. (England) Trina Gulliver (Last 128)
12. (England) Paula Jacklin (Last 128)
13. (Australia) Tori Kewish (Last 16)
14. (England) Kirsty Hutchinson (Last 64)
15. (Sweden) Vicky Pruim (quarter-finals)
16. (England) Jo Clements (Last 128)

== Women's draw (last 8 onwards) ==
Quarter-finals (best of 7 legs); 26 October
1	(England) Lisa Ashton 85.69	4
(Japan) Mayumi Ouchi 68.19	1
(Japan) Kasumi Sato 87.13	4
4	(England) Deta Hedman 74.55	0
(Australia) Corrine Hammond 67.37	1
6	(Russia) Anastasia Dobromyslova 76.86	4
7	(England) Lorraine Winstanley 85.89	4
15	(Sweden) Vicky Pruim 79.70	0

Semi-finals (best of 7 legs); 27 October
1	(England) Lisa Ashton 79.59	5
(Japan) Kasumi Sato 72.11	1
6	(Russia) Anastasia Dobromyslova 80.09	5
7	(England) Lorraine Winstanley 68.43	1

Final (best of 9 legs); 27 October
1	(England) Lisa Ashton 85.50	5
6	(Russia) Anastasia Dobromyslova 82.76	4
