= Vladyslav Omelchenko =

Ukrainian darts player (born 1975)

Personal information
- Full name: Владислав Омельченко
- Nickname: "The Miner"
- Born: 24 September 1975 (age 51) Krivyi Rih, Ukrainian SSR, Soviet Union
- Home town: Krivyi Rih, Ukraine

Sport
- Sport: Darts
- Playing since: 2007
- Darts: 24g Winmau
- Laterality: Right-handed
- Walk-on music: "Wild Dances" by Ruslana

Organisation (see split in darts)
- PDC: 2022–
- WDF: 2018–2019

PDC premier events – best performances
- World Championship: Last 96: 2023

Other tournament wins
- Years
PDC Ukrainian Qualifier	2022

Vladyslav Omelchenko (Ukrainian: Владислав Омельченко; born 24 September 1975) is a Ukrainian darts player who has competed in the Professional Darts Corporation (PDC) and other national events. He became the first player from Ukraine to qualify for the PDC World Darts Championship. He has represented his country in the PDC World Cup of Darts, WDF World Cup and WDF Europe Cup. In the past, he worked as a miner.

== Career ==
Omelchenko made his international debut at the 2018 WDF Europe Cup. In the singles competition, he only played one game in the first round, where he lost to Andy Bless by 2–4 in legs. In the team competition, Ukraine was eliminated in the group stage, finishing fourth out of five. In 2019, Vladyslav took part in the second edition of Ukraine Open and Kiev Masters. In the second tournament he reached the quarter-finals.

A month later, he represented Ukraine at the 2019 WDF World Cup. In the individual competition, he reached the third round, defeating on his way Marjan Sket and Wesley Daries. In the third round, he slightly lost to Andreas Harrysson by 3–4 in legs. In the team competition, the Ukrainians surprisingly left the group by defeating Germany. In the second round they were defeated by the Slovak national team.

In the following years, his career development was slowed down by the coronavirus pandemic. Due to the situation related to 2022 Russian invasion of Ukraine, he took part in the first ever qualification for the PDC World Darts Championship for players from Ukraine. He won his way through to the quarter-finals, where he beat Artem Usyk by 6–3 in legs. In the semi-finals he defeated Yaroslav Mykytyn by 6–4 in legs, and in the final he defeated Volodymyr Zalevskyi 3–0 in sets, qualified for the 2023 PDC World Darts Championship for the first time. He was drawn to play Luke Woodhouse in the first round and lost 3–0, with his biggest highlight being a 143 checkout. Despite the defeat, his performance was praised by opponent Woodhouse as well as two-time PDC World Championship semi-finalist Mark Webster.

Omelchenko represented Ukraine in the PDC World Cup of Darts for the first time at the 2023 edition in the nation's debut at the tournament, teaming with qualifier Ilya Pekaruk. The pair finished bottom of Group D after 4–0 losses to Northern Ireland and France.

== World Championship results ==
=== PDC ===
- 2023: First round (lost to Luke Woodhouse 0–3)
