= Farranree =

Suburb of Cork, Ireland

Farranree Fearann an Rí
- Suburb
- Location in Ireland
- Coordinates: 51.9135°N 8.4835°W
- Country: Ireland
- Administrative area: Cork (city)
- Time zone: UTC+0 (WET)
  - Summer (DST): UTC-1 (IST (WEST))

Farranree (Irish: Fearann an Rí) is a mainly residential townland and suburb in Cork, Ireland. It is bordered by the larger suburbs of Blackpool, Churchfield and Fairhill.

== History ==
As of the early 20th century, Farranree was a rural area to the north of Cork City. It had a large field called "Fairfield" to which farmers from around County Cork brought their cattle for sale. Beside it were smaller fields where farmers would spancel their cattle as they waited to be sold. This area, on the hillside beside the "Fairfield", was called Spangle or Spancel Hill.

Cork Corporation subsequently developed a number of housing schemes in the area, which was then known as Spangle Hill. From the 1930s, the city gradually began to expand and houses were built in areas such as Farranferris (1939 & 1951), Fairfield (1956), Knockpogue (1956), Knockfree (1959/1960) and Closes (1961).

In 1957, the Catholic Bishop of Cork, Cornelius Lucey, commenced construction on a new church in the district. Built as one of several "rosary churches", intended to serve the expanding city, it was called the Church of the Resurrection.

== Amenities ==
Farranree has a local Gala Express shop, a credit union, a butchers and a public park. It also has a Catholic church named the Church of the Resurrection.

The local Gaelic Athletic Association (GAA) club is Na Piarsaigh GAA club.

Primary schools in the area include Scoil Aiséirí Chríost and Scoil Íosagain. Nano Nagle College (formerly North Presentation Secondary School) is also in Farranree. The North Monastery campus is also nearby.

The area is served by Bus Éireann route numbers 201 and 203.

== Notable residents ==
- John Gardiner, Na Piarsaigh and Cork senior All-Ireland winning hurler
- Seán Óg Ó hAilpín, Na Piarsaigh and Cork senior All-Ireland winning hurler and footballer
- Mae Agnes "Maisie" Kelly Gleason, the mother of Jackie Gleason, was born at Farranree
- Fiona Shaw, actress, born in Farranree
- John O'Shea, professional darts player, BDO World Masters winner
