= Nobuhiro Yamamoto =

Japanese darts player

Nobuhiro Yamamoto 山本 信博
Personal information
- Nickname: "The Craftsman"
- Born: 12 November 1977 (age 48) Osaka, Osaka Prefecture, Japan
- Home town: Osaka, Japan

Sport
- Sport: Darts
- Playing since: 2009
- Darts: 18g Dynasty
- Laterality: Right-handed
- Walk-on music: "Be There" by B'z

Organisation (see split in darts)
- BDO: 2015–2020
- PDC: 2014–
- WDF: 2015–

PDC premier events – best performances
- World Championship: Last 96: 2023

Other tournament wins
- Years
PDJ Championship	2022

Nobuhiro Yamamoto (山本 信博, Yamamoto Nobuhiro; born 12 November 1977) is a Japanese professional soft-tip and steel-tip darts player who plays in Professional Darts Corporation (PDC), World Darts Federation (WDF) and other national events. He played at the 2023 PDC World Darts Championship as a PDJ Japan Champion.

== Career ==
He started his career in 2009 when he qualified for a local soft-tip tournament, where he reached the fourth round. Since 2012, he has been in the leading positions in the national ranking. In 2014, he tried his hand at qualifying for the PDC World Darts Championship for the first time. In 2015, he advanced to the quarter-finals of the Japan Open. In 2018, he reached the quarter-finals again in the Japan Open.

In 2019, he participated in the PDC Asian Tour tournaments organised in Kobe. In the fourth tournament of this series, he advanced to the fourth round, where he lost to Seigo Asada by 3–5 in legs. Due to the coronavirus pandemic, he was not active in international steel-tip tournaments. He returned to competition in 2022, starting at the Bud Brick Memorial and the Japan Open. In both tournaments he advanced to the quarter-finals. At the end of July 2022, he won a PDC Japan Championship, which is considered the qualifier for the 2023 PDC World Darts Championship. In the final, he beat Sho Katsumi by 5–4 in legs.

== World Championship results ==
=== PDC ===
- 2023: First round (lost to Martin Lukeman 0–3)

== Performance timeline ==
Tournament	2023
PDC Ranked televised events
World Championship	1R
