= Keane Barry =

Irish darts player (born 2002)

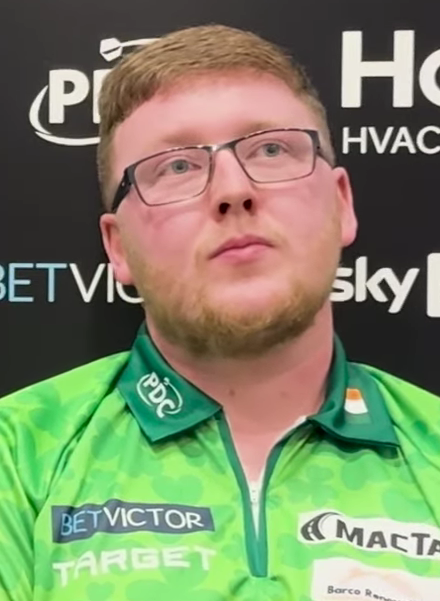
- Barry in 2025

Personal information
- Nickname: "Dynamite"
- Born: 25 June 2002 (age 24) Duleek, County Meath, Ireland

Sport
- Sport: Darts
- Playing since: 2006
- Darts: 24g Target Keane Barry G2
- Laterality: Right-handed
- Walk-on music: "TNT" by AC/DC

Organisation (see split in darts)
- BDO: 2016–2020
- PDC: 2020–present (Tour Card: 2021–present)
- Current world ranking: (PDC) 56 (29 October 2026)

PDC premier events – best performances
- World Championship: Last 64: 2022, 2024, 2025, 2026
- UK Open: Semi-final: 2022
- European Championship: Last 32: 2021, 2023
- PC Finals: Last 16: 2022
- World Series Finals: Last 32: 2024

Other tournament wins
- Years
Northern Ireland Matchplay	2019
PDC Challenge Tour	2020
Tom Kirby Memorial Irish Matchplay	2019
Youth events
BDO Finder Youth Masters	2018
BDO World Masters	2019
BDO World Youth Championship	2020
JDC International Open	2019
JDC Super 16	2020
JDC World Championship	2019
PDC Development Tour	2020 (×2); 2022 (×3); 2024 (×3)

Keane Barry (born 25 June 2002) is an Irish professional darts player who competes in Professional Darts Corporation (PDC) events. A professional since 2021, he reached his first PDC major semi-final at the 2022 UK Open and has represented Ireland at the PDC World Cup of Darts.

In his youth career, Barry found success in the British Darts Organisation (BDO)'s youth system, most notably winning the 2020 BDO World Youth Championship. He also won eight PDC Development Tours, as well as the Junior Darts Corporation's JDC World Darts Championship in 2019.

== Early life ==
Born on 25 June 2002, Keane Barry is from Duleek, County Meath, Ireland. The son of Neil and Vivienne Barry, he was named after footballer Roy Keane. He started playing darts at the age of four after asking his father to let him join in on his practice; he claimed to hit his first score of 180 at age five. He began competing in adult tournaments at a pub in Tullyallen, County Louth. Outside of darts, Barry played underage Gaelic football for Duleek/Bellewstown GAA. He was educated at St Mary's Diocesan School in Drogheda.

== Career ==
=== 2015–2019: Early career ===
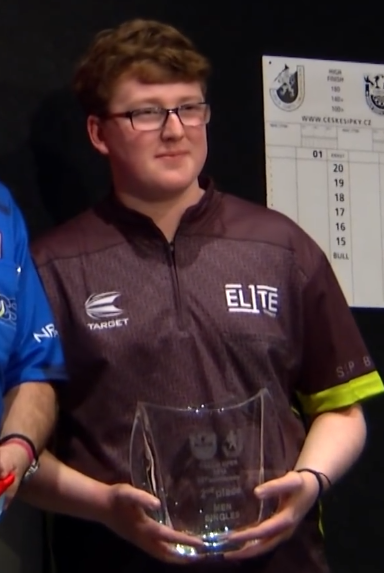
Barry at the 2019 Czech Open

Barry started competing alongside his father, Neil, in the local Duleek and District Darts League, representing the Greyhound Bar. He showed promise from an early age and was awarded the league's Star of the Future Award in 2015, at the age of 12. He became captain of the Irish youth national team and was a finalist in the 2016 WDF Europe Youth Cup boys' event, where he lost 3–1 to Justin van Tergouw of the Netherlands. He won his first British Darts Organisation (BDO) youth tournament at the 2016 Northern Ireland Open. At age 15, he was touted as the number-one youth player in Ireland by former professional Mick McGowan.

Barry was the runner-up at the BDO World Youth Masters in 2017 and 2018, losing in a deciding leg in both matches. He won the youth final at the 2018 Finder Darts Masters by beating Levy Frauenfelder 2–0 in sets. He captured the World Youth Masters title in 2019, defeating Charlie Manby in his third successive final. He began competing on the PDC Development Tour in 2018 and reached his first final during the 2019 season, losing to compatriot Shane McGuirk. He also won the 2019 JDC International Open, beating Nathan Girvan in the final.

After playing the early rounds of the Tom Kirby Memorial Irish Matchplay in Tramore, Barry qualified for the final which was contested during the World Grand Prix in October. In the lead-up to the match, he claimed his first BDO senior title at the Northern Ireland Matchplay with a 6–2 victory over Paul Hogan. Barry beat Liam Gallagher to win the Irish Matchplay, coming back from 5–2 down to win 6–5 and surviving eleven missed match darts from Gallagher. This victory secured him a place at the 2020 PDC World Championship.

Barry reached the semi-finals of the 2019 PDC World Youth Championship, where he lost 6–2 to Luke Humphries. On 16 December 2019, he made his PDC World Championship debut as the youngest player in the tournament, aged 17, where he lost to Vincent van der Voort 3–0 in sets. On 21 December, he defeated Adam Gawlas 5–3 in the JDC World Championship final.

=== 2020: BDO World Youth Champion ===
In January 2020, Barry defeated defending champion Leighton Bennett 3–0 in sets to win the 2020 BDO World Youth Championship. Later in January, Barry attended UK Q-School in an attempt to earn a PDC Tour Card. On the last day of play, he reached the final alongside Scott Waites, with the victor obtaining a Tour Card; Barry lost 5–0.

In February, Barry won the JDC Super 16 title in his last JDC event with a 5–3 win over Luke Littler. He spent the rest of 2020 competing in PDC Development Tour and Challenge Tour events. He picked up his sole Challenge Tour title in event five, beating Maikel Verberk 5–4 in the final. He won back-to-back Development Tour titles in events eight and nine: he won five straight legs to defeat Ryan Meikle 5–3 in the final of the former, before beating Meikle again the following day to claim the event nine title with a 5–4 score. He finished second on the 2020 Development Tour Order of Merit to secure a PDC Tour Card for the first time and a place at the 2021 PDC World Championship.

=== 2021–2022: UK Open semi-finalist ===
Barry competed on the opening night of the 2021 World Championship, losing his first-round match to Jeff Smith 3–1 in sets. He made his PDC European Tour debut at the 2021 Hungarian Darts Trophy. He got past Thomas Lovely and Dirk van Duijvenbode to reach the third round, where he lost to eventual runner-up Michael Smith.

Barry claimed his first Alexandra Palace win in the first round of the 2022 World Championship. He established a 2–0 lead against Royden Lam before Lam won the next two sets to level the match at 2–2, with Barry taking the final set to secure a 3–2 victory. He almost produced a surprise result in the second round by going 2–1 up against Jonny Clayton – one of the tournament favourites – before ultimately losing 3–2. At the UK Open, Barry had his best run at a PDC major event by reaching the semi-finals, including eliminating the defending champion James Wade 10–4 in the quarter-finals. He lost 11–6 in the semi-finals to Michael Smith. His run at the tournament saw him earn £20,000 in prize money, which caused him to rise from 66th to 52nd on the PDC Order of Merit. Barry reached the semi-finals of Players Championship 16 in June 2022, where he was beaten 7–1 by Dirk van Duijvenbode. He also competed on the Development Tour that year, closing his campaign with three titles at events two, 12, and 15.

=== 2023–present ===
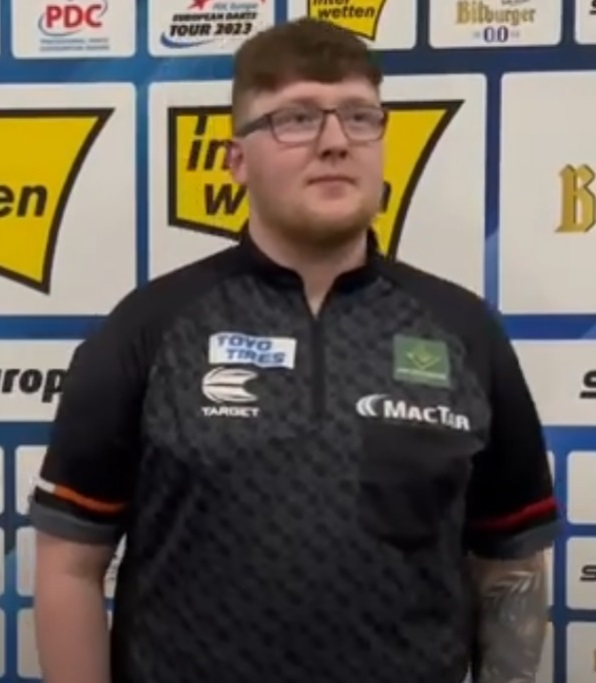
Barry at the 2023 Dutch Darts Championship

Barry, ranked world number 45, was eliminated in the first round of the 2023 World Championship in a shock 3–1 loss to South African qualifier Grant Sampson. On the European Tour, Barry reached the quarter-finals at both the German Grand Prix and the Dutch Championship; he was eliminated by reigning world champion Michael Smith and three-time world champion Michael van Gerwen, respectively. His results on the European Tour saw him qualify for the European Championship, where he succumbed to a 6–1 defeat to former world champion Gerwyn Price in the first round. Barry also represented Ireland in the PDC World Cup for the first time, partnering William O'Connor.

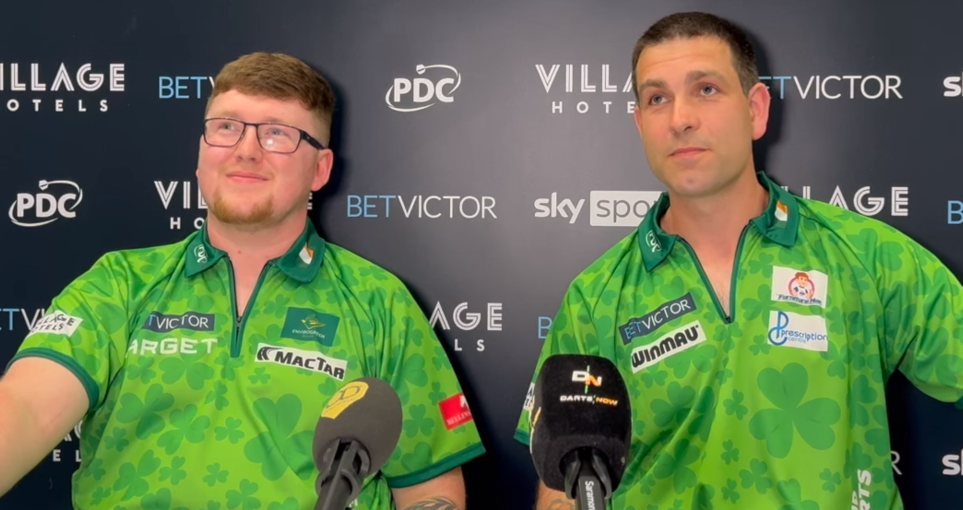
Barry (left) and William O'Connor representing Ireland at the 2024 PDC World Cup of Darts

Barry was drawn against Reynaldo Rivera in the first round of the 2024 World Championship. He defeated Rivera 3–1 to advance to the second round, where he was eliminated following a 3–0 loss to Michael van Gerwen. He partnered O'Connor again at the PDC World Cup, where they were eliminated in Group E by Chinese Taipei. He reached his second PDC World Youth Championship semi-final, where he was defeated 6–4 by Jurjen van der Velde. In November, Barry was one of eight players to earn a place at the Grand Slam of Darts through the Tour Card Holder Qualifier, his debut at the event. He exited the tournament by finishing third in Group F, with a win against Lourence Ilagan and losses against Luke Littler and Dimitri Van den Bergh.

Barry took one of the two Development Tour qualifying spots for the 2025 World Championship after winning three titles in 2024. He claimed back-to-back titles at events two and three before adding a third win at event twelve. At his sixth PDC World Championship, he won his opening match 3–1 against Kim Huybrechts, before a 3–0 defeat by Gerwyn Price in the second round. Barry and O'Connor reached the quarter-finals of the 2025 PDC World Cup, where they were eliminated by Northern Ireland.

At the 2026 World Championship, Barry defeated Tim Pusey 3–0 in the first round. He was beaten 3–0 by Martin Schindler in the second round. He defeated Michael Smith and Stephen Bunting on his way to the semi-finals of Players Championship 7 in March 2026, losing 7–6 to Alan Soutar.

== Personal life ==
After leaving school, Barry worked for his father's scaffolding business. He has an avid interest in greyhound racing, as his father owned greyhounds when he was younger, and his girlfriend's family are also involved in the sport. In 2026, he partnered with optical retail chain Specsavers.

Barry has been associated with darts manufacturer Target since 2019. His darts nickname is "Dynamite" – in reference to his quick throwing style – and his walk-on music is "TNT" by AC/DC.

== World Championship results ==
=== PDC ===
- 2020: First round (lost to Vincent van der Voort 0–3)
- 2021: First round (lost to Jeff Smith 1–3)
- 2022: Second round (lost to Jonny Clayton 2–3)
- 2023: First round (lost to Grant Sampson 1–3)
- 2024: Second round (lost to Michael van Gerwen 0–3)
- 2025: Second round (lost to Gerwyn Price 0–3)
- 2026: Second round (lost to Martin Schindler 0–3)

== Performance timeline ==
Keane Barry's performance timeline is as follows:

Tournament	2019	2020	2021	2022	2023	2024	2025	2026
PDC Ranked televised events
World Championship	DNQ	1R	1R	2R	1R	2R	2R	2R
World Masters (Note: A non-ranked event until 2025)	Did not qualify						Prel.	Prel.
UK Open	DNP	1R	3R	SF	4R	6R	3R	6R
European Championship	DNQ		1R	DNQ	1R	DNQ		
Grand Slam	Did not qualify					RR	DNQ	
Players Championship Finals	DNQ		1R	3R	DNQ		1R	
PDC Non-ranked televised events
World Cup	Did not qualify				RR	RR	QF	DNQ
World Series Finals	Did not qualify					1R	DNQ	
World Youth Championship	SF	3R	QF	QF	3R	SF	QF	2R
Career statistics
Season-end ranking (PDC)	137	118	72	42	41	50	58	

=== PDC European Tour ===
Season	1	2	3	4	5	6	7	8	9	10	11	12	13	14	15
2021	HDT; 3R	GDT; 1R													
2022	IDO; 2R	GDC; DNQ	GDG; 3R	ADO; DNQ	EDO; 1R	Did not qualify					GDO; 1R	BDO; 2R	GDT; 1R		
2023	Did not qualify			GDG; QF	ADO; DNQ	DDC; QF	BDO; 2R	CDO; DNQ	EDG; DNQ	EDM; 2R	GDO; DNQ	HDT; 2R	GDC; DNQ		
2024	Did not qualify			EDG; 2R	Did not qualify						HDT; 2R	SDT; DNQ	CDO; DNQ		
2025	Did not qualify													GDC; 1R	
2026	PDO; DNQ	EDT; 1R	DNQ		EDG; 2R	ADO; DNQ	IDO; 1R	BSD; DNQ	SDO; 1R	EDO; DNQ	HDT; 3R	CDO; 3R	DNQ		DDC

=== PDC Players Championships ===
Season	1	2	3	4	5	6	7	8	9	10	11	12	13	14	15	16	17	18	19	20	21	22	23	24	25	26	27	28	29	30	31	32	33	34
2020 (Note: Not a Tour Card holder)	DNP																		COV; 3R	COV; 4R	COV; 3R	COV; 1R	COV; 2R											
2021	BOL; 4R	BOL; 1R	BOL; 4R	BOL; 1R	MIL; 1R	MIL; 2R	MIL; 1R	MIL; 1R	NIE; 1R	NIE; 1R	NIE; 2R	NIE; 1R	MIL; 3R	MIL; DNP	MIL; DNP	MIL; DNP	COV; 3R	COV; 1R	COV; 2R	COV; 1R	BAR; 1R	BAR; QF	BAR; 1R	BAR; 3R	BAR; 1R	BAR; 1R	BAR; 2R	BAR; 2R	BAR; 2R	BAR; 2R				
2022	BAR; 3R	BAR; 2R	WIG; QF	WIG; 1R	BAR; 3R	BAR; 2R	NIE; 3R	NIE; 4R	BAR; 1R	BAR; 2R	BAR; 1R	BAR; 3R	BAR; 1R	WIG; 1R	WIG; 3R	NIE; SF	NIE; 1R	BAR; 1R	BAR; 2R	BAR; 1R	BAR; 3R	BAR; 1R	BAR; 1R	BAR; 3R	BAR; 1R	BAR; 1R	BAR; 2R	BAR; 1R	BAR; 1R	BAR; 3R				
2023	BAR; 1R	BAR; 2R	BAR; 1R	BAR; 4R	BAR; 1R	BAR; 2R	HIL; 1R	HIL; 1R	WIG; 4R	WIG; 2R	LEI; 1R	LEI; DNP	HIL; 2R	HIL; 1R	LEI; 3R	LEI; 1R	HIL; 1R	HIL; 3R	BAR; 1R	BAR; 1R	BAR; 2R	BAR; 1R	BAR; 1R	BAR; 2R	BAR; 2R	BAR; 4R	BAR; 1R	BAR; 1R	BAR; 1R	BAR; 1R				
2024	WIG; 1R	WIG; 1R	LEI; 1R	LEI; 1R	HIL; 1R	HIL; 1R	LEI; 1R	LEI; 1R	HIL; 1R	HIL; 3R	HIL; 1R	HIL; QF	MIL; 1R	MIL; 1R	MIL; 2R	MIL; 1R	MIL; QF	MIL; 1R	MIL; 1R	WIG; 1R	WIG; 2R	LEI; 1R	LEI; 2R	WIG; 1R	WIG; 2R	WIG; 2R	WIG; QF	WIG; 2R	LEI; 1R	LEI; 2R				
2025	WIG; 2R	WIG; 1R	ROS; 1R	ROS; 1R	LEI; 2R	LEI; 3R	HIL; 1R	HIL; 1R	LEI; 2R	LEI; 1R	LEI; 1R	LEI; 1R	ROS; 1R	ROS; 1R	HIL; 3R	HIL; 1R	LEI; 2R	LEI; 2R	LEI; 2R	LEI; 4R	LEI; 1R	HIL; 4R	HIL; 2R	MIL; 2R	MIL; 4R	HIL; 4R	HIL; 1R	LEI; 2R	LEI; 1R	LEI; 1R	WIG; 2R	WIG; 1R	WIG; 2R	WIG; QF
2026	HIL; 2R	HIL; 1R	WIG; 1R	WIG; 1R	LEI; 2R	LEI; 1R	LEI; SF	LEI; 4R	WIG; 1R	WIG; 1R	MIL; 1R	MIL; 2R	HIL; 1R	HIL; 4R	LEI; 4R	LEI; 1R	LEI; 4R	LEI; 1R	MIL; 1R	MIL; 1R	WIG; 3R	WIG; 1R	LEI; 1R	LEI; 1R	HIL; 1R	HIL; 1R	LEI; 3R	LEI; 2R	ROS; 3R	ROS; 3R	ROS; 4R	ROS; 2R	LEI; 1R	LEI; 1R

Performance Table Legend
W	Won the tournament	F	Finalist	SF	Semifinalist	QF	Quarterfinalist	#R; RR; Prel.	Lost in # round Round-robin; Preliminary round	DQ	Disqualified
DNQ	Did not qualify	DNP	Did not participate	WD	Withdrew	NH	Tournament not held	#R; RR; Prel.	Lost in # round Round-robin; Preliminary round	NYF	Not yet founded
