= Grant Sampson =

South African darts player

Personal information
- Nickname: "The Samurai"
- Born: 26 January 1982 (age 44) Cape Town, South Africa
- Home town: Cape Town, South Africa

Sport
- Sport: Darts
- Playing since: 2020
- Darts: 22g Red Dragon
- Laterality: Right-handed
- Walk-on music: "I Believe" by Yolanda Adams

Organisation (see split in darts)
- PDC: 2022–

PDC premier events – best performances
- World Championship: Last 64: 2023

Other tournament wins
- Years
PDC African Qualifier	2022

Grant Sampson (born 26 January 1982) is a South African professional darts player who plays in the Professional Darts Corporation (PDC) and other national events. He qualified for the 2023 PDC World Darts Championship by winning the African Qualifier to make his first appearance at the Worlds.

== Career ==
In October 2022, Sampson defeated Laezeltrich Wentzel to win the African Qualifier (after earlier beating heavy favourite Devon Petersen) and qualify for the 2023 PDC World Darts Championship, his debut year at the competition. He was defeated by 31st seed Kim Huybrechts 0–3 in the second round, having defeated Keane Barry 3–1 in his first round match.

== World Championship results ==
=== PDC ===
- 2023: Second round (lost to Kim Huybrechts 0–3) (sets)

== Performance timeline ==
Tournament	2023
PDC Ranked televised events
World Championship	2R
Career statistics
Year-end ranking (PDC)	119
