= John O'Shea (darts player) =

Irish darts player (born 1975)

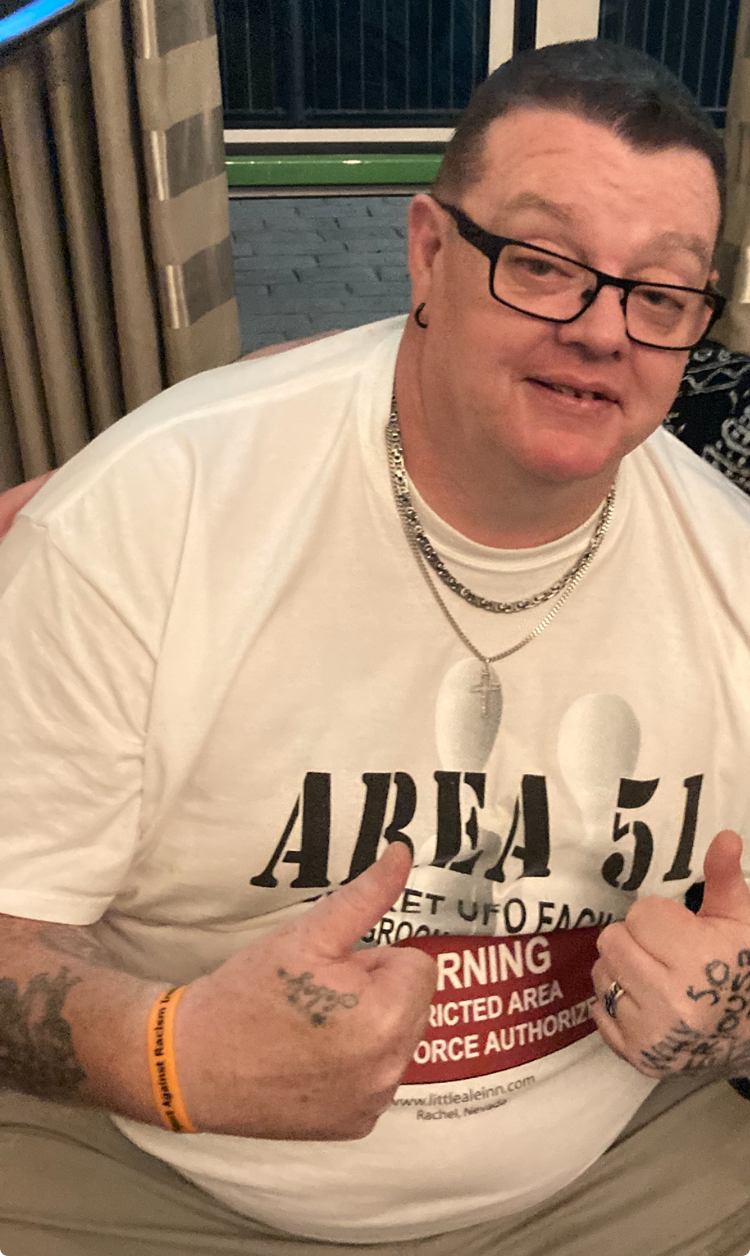
- O'Shea in 2025

Personal information
- Nickname: "The Joker"
- Born: 24 July 1975 (age 51) Cork, Ireland
- Home town: Farranree, Cork, Ireland

Sport
- Sport: Darts
- Playing since: 1995
- Darts: 23g Mission
- Laterality: Right-handed
- Walk-on music: "Tell Me Ma" by Sham Rock

Organisation (see split in darts)
- BDO: 2009–2010, 2015–2020
- PDC: 2010–2014, 2022–
- WDF: 2009–2010, 2015–2022

WDF major events – best performances
- World Championship: Last 40: 2020
- World Masters: Winner (1): 2019

PDC premier events – best performances
- World Championship: Last 96: 2023
- UK Open: Last 96: 2011, 2022
- PC Finals: Last 64: 2022

Other tournament wins
- Years
Irish Players Ch'ship	2010, 2011, 2014
Tramore Autumn Festival	2010

John O'Shea (born 24 July 1975) is an Irish darts player who formerly competed in Professional Darts Corporation (PDC) events. Formerly known as "Seboy", O'Shea is now nicknamed "the Joker". He won the 2019 World Masters.

== Career ==
O'Shea started playing darts at the age of 16. He won two All-Ireland darts titles with Cork and a European bronze medal playing for Ireland.

O'Shea had his biggest career win at the 2019 World Masters, where he defeated Scott Waites 6–4 in the final. He became the first Irish player to be crowned champion in the tournament's history. Originally ranked number 219 in the British Darts Organisation rankings, he rose to number 59 and also earned qualification for the 2020 BDO World Darts Championship. At the BDO World Championship, he lost 3–2 to Andreas Harrysson in the preliminary round.

O'Shea earned a two-year PDC Tour Card at 2022 Q-School after finishing ninth in the UK Q-School Order of Merit. He reached his first PDC ranking final in Players Championship 14, losing 7–4 to Michael Smith.

He made his PDC World Darts Championship debut at the 2023 World Championship, but lost 3–2 to Darius Labanauskas in the first round.

== Personal life ==
O'Shea lives in Farranree with his wife and four children.

== World Championship results ==
=== BDO ===
- 2020: Preliminary round (lost to Andreas Harrysson 2–3)

=== PDC ===
- 2023: First round (lost to Darius Labanauskas 2–3)

== Performance timeline ==
=== BDO ===
Tournament	2016	2017	2019	2020
BDO Ranked televised events
BDO World Championship	DNQ			Prel.
World Masters	QF	3R	W	NH

=== PDC ===
Tournament	2011	2022	2023
PDC Ranked televised events
World Championship	DNQ		1R
UK Open	2R	3R	2R
Players Championship Finals	DNP	1R	DNQ
Career statistics
Year-end ranking	134	85	77

==== European Tour ====
Tournament	2022	2023
German Grand Prix	1R	DNQ
Dutch Championship	DNQ	1R

=== PDC Players Championships ===
Season	1	2	3	4	5	6	7	8	9	10	11	12	13	14	15	16	17	18	19	20	21	22	23	24	25	26	27	28	29	30	31
2011 (Note: Not a Tour card holder)	HAL; DNP		DER; 1R	DER; 1R	Did not participate												DER; 2R	DER; 2R	NUL; 1R	NUL; 1R	Did not participate										
2022	BAR; 2R	BAR; 3R	WIG; 1R	WIG; 1R	BAR; 3R	BAR; 2R	NIE; 1R	NIE; 1R	BAR; 2R	BAR; 2R	BAR; 2R	BAR; 1R	BAR; 1R	WIG; F	WIG; 2R	NIE; 2R	NIE; 3R	BAR; 1R	BAR; 1R	BAR; 3R	BAR; 1R	BAR; 4R	BAR; 1R	BAR; 1R	BAR; 3R	BAR; 1R	BAR; 2R	BAR; 2R	BAR; 2R	BAR; 2R	
2023	BAR; 1R	BAR; 2R	BAR; 2R	BAR; 1R	BAR; 1R	BAR; 3R	HIL; 1R	HIL; 1R	WIG; 2R	WIG; 3R	LEI; DNP		HIL; 1R	HIL; 1R	LEI; 1R	LEI; 2R	HIL; 1R	HIL; 1R	BAR; 1R	BAR; 3R	BAR; 1R	BAR; 2R	BAR; 1R	BAR; 1R	BAR; 2R	BAR; 2R	BAR; 1R	BAR; 1R	BAR; 1R	BAR; 1R	

Performance Table Legend
W	Won the tournament	F	Finalist	SF	Semifinalist	QF	Quarterfinalist	#R; RR; Prel.	Lost in # round Round-robin; Preliminary round	DQ	Disqualified
DNQ	Did not qualify	DNP	Did not participate	WD	Withdrew	NH	Tournament not held	#R; RR; Prel.	Lost in # round Round-robin; Preliminary round	NYF	Not yet founded
