= 2022 Players Championship Finals =

2022 Cazoo Players Championship Finals

Tournament information
- Dates: 25–27 November 2022
- Venue: Butlin's Minehead
- Location: Minehead, England
- Organisation(s): Professional Darts Corporation (PDC)
- Format: Legs
- Prize fund: £500,000
- Winner's share: £100,000
- Nine-dart finish: Michael van Gerwen
- High checkout: 170 Michael van Gerwen

Champion(s)
- Michael van Gerwen (NED)

The 2022 Cazoo Players Championship Finals was the fifteenth edition of the PDC darts tournament, which saw the top 64 players from the 2022 PDC Players Championship series take part. The tournament took place from 25 to 27 November 2022 at the Butlin's Resort, Minehead.

Peter Wright was the previous champion, after defeating Ryan Searle 11–10 in the 2021 final. However, he did not defend his title after withdrawing for family reasons.

Michael van Gerwen won the tournament for a seventh time, defeating Rob Cross 11–6 in the final, hitting the tournament's only nine-dart finish and a 170 checkout in the final.

In a slight change to the usual format, and to avoid a direct clash with England’s 2022 FIFA World Cup group match with the USA which took place on the evening of the opening night of the competition, all matches in the first round were played during the day in a single bumper session.

== Prize money ==
The 2022 Players Championship Finals prize fund remained at £500,000, before going up to £600,000 in 2023.

The following is the breakdown of the fund:

Position (no. of players)		Prize money (Total: £500,000)
Winner	(1)	£100,000
Runner-up	(1)	£50,000
Semi-finalists	(2)	£25,000
Quarter-finalists	(4)	£15,000
Last 16 (third round)	(8)	£10,000
Last 32 (second round)	(16)	£5,000
Last 64 (first round)	(32)	£2,500

== Qualification ==
The top 64 players from the Players Championships Order of Merit qualified, which is solely based on prize money won in the 30 Players Championship events during the season. Peter Wright withdrew from the event for family reasons and was directly replaced in the draw by Gian van Veen.

The following players qualified:

Click on the seed number of a player to go to their draw section.

=== Top 64 in the Players Championship Order of Merit ===
1. Damon Heta (first round)
2. Luke Humphries (semi-finals)
3. Nathan Aspinall (first round)
4. Dirk van Duijvenbode (quarter-finals)
5. Rob Cross (runner-up)
6. Michael Smith (first round)
7. Dave Chisnall (second round)
8. Gerwyn Price (first round)
9. ~~Peter Wright~~ (withdrew)
10. Joe Cullen (quarter-finals)
11. Josh Rock (first round)
12. Martin Schindler (third round)
13. Ryan Searle (third round)
14. Danny Noppert (quarter-finals)
15. Krzysztof Ratajski (third round)
16. Andrew Gilding (second round)
17. Adrian Lewis (first round)
18. José de Sousa (second round)
19. James Wade (second round)
20. Stephen Bunting (first round)
21. Chris Dobey (second round)
22. Michael van Gerwen (champion)
23. Kim Huybrechts (second round)
24. Jonny Clayton (semi-finals)
25. Brendan Dolan (first round)
26. Scott Williams (third round)
27. Dimitri Van den Bergh (third round)
28. Gabriel Clemens (first round)
29. Daryl Gurney (second round)
30. Matt Campbell (third round)
31. Jim Williams (first round)
32. Callan Rydz (quarter-finals)
33. Madars Razma (first round)
34. Mike De Decker (second round)
35. Steve Beaton (first round)
36. Keegan Brown (first round)
37. Gary Anderson (second round)
38. Martin Lukeman (first round)
39. Alan Soutar (first round)
40. Jermaine Wattimena (second round)
41. John O'Shea (first round)
42. Raymond van Barneveld (first round)
43. Ryan Meikle (first round)
44. Geert Nentjes (first round)
45. Jamie Hughes (second round)
46. Mensur Suljović (first round)
47. Danny Jansen (first round)
48. Keane Barry (third round)
49. Ricky Evans (first round)
50. William O'Connor (first round)
51. Simon Whitlock (first round)
52. Mervyn King (first round)
53. Vincent van der Voort (first round)
54. Cameron Menzies (second round)
55. Rowby-John Rodriguez (first round)
56. Ross Smith (second round)
57. Ryan Joyce (third round)
58. Niels Zonneveld (first round)
59. Ritchie Edhouse (second round)
60. Kevin Doets (first round)
61. Mickey Mansell (first round)
62. Martijn Kleermaker (second round)
63. Nathan Rafferty (first round)
64. Ricardo Pietreczko (second round)
65. Gian van Veen (first round)

== Draw ==
There was no draw held; all players were put in a fixed bracket by their seeding positions.

=== Finals ===
Quarter-finals (best of 19 legs); 27 November
32	Callan Rydz 90.58	3
24	Jonny Clayton 96.17	10
4	Dirk van Duijvenbode 94.62	3
5	Rob Cross 104.17	10
2	Luke Humphries 102.85	10
10	Joe Cullen 94.72	3
14	Danny Noppert 95.30	7
22	Michael van Gerwen 100.75	10

Semi-finals (best of 21 legs); 27 November
24	Jonny Clayton 93.86	7
5	Rob Cross 97.83	11
2	Luke Humphries 93.90	5
22	Michael van Gerwen 101.59	11

Final (best of 21 legs); 27 November
5	Rob Cross 100.33	6
22	Michael van Gerwen 99.92	11

=== Top half ===
==== Section 1 ====
First round (best of 11 legs); 25 November
1	Damon Heta 96.17	5
64	Ricardo Pietreczko 92.15	6
32	Callan Rydz 87.72	6
33	Madars Razma 78.68	5
16	Andrew Gilding 100.91	6
49	Ricky Evans 92.65	2
17	Adrian Lewis 88.33	4
48	Keane Barry 97.69	6
8	Gerwyn Price 95.74	5
57	Ryan Joyce 94.56	6
25	Brendan Dolan 91.36	3
40	Jermaine Wattimena 94.26	6
Alt/65	Gian van Veen 95.78	2
56	Ross Smith 95.97	6
24	Jonny Clayton 95.94	6
41	John O'Shea 95.24	0

Second round (best of 11 legs); 26 November
64	Ricardo Pietreczko 88.52	3
32	Callan Rydz 86.39	6
16	Andrew Gilding 91.66	5
48	Keane Barry 100.70	6
57	Ryan Joyce 92.83	6
40	Jermaine Wattimena 84.09	3
56	Ross Smith 92.95	5
24	Jonny Clayton 92.38	6

Third round (best of 19 legs); 26 November
32	Callan Rydz 91.29	10
48	Keane Barry 93.28	8
57	Ryan Joyce 87.76	3
24	Jonny Clayton 91.90	10

Quarter-finals (best of 19 legs); 27 November
32	Callan Rydz 90.58	3
24	Jonny Clayton 96.17	10

==== Section 2 ====
First round (best of 11 legs); 25 November
4	Dirk van Duijvenbode 95.62	6
61	Mickey Mansell 92.52	5
29	Daryl Gurney 81.97	6
36	Keegan Brown 83.20	3
13	Ryan Searle 99.42	6
52	Mervyn King 92.14	4
20	Stephen Bunting 83.98	4
45	Jamie Hughes 92.03	6
5	Rob Cross 96.11	6
60	Kevin Doets 89.53	3
28	Gabriel Clemens 90.78	4
37	Gary Anderson 86.13	6
12	Martin Schindler 102.17	6
53	Vincent van der Voort 96.36	4
21	Chris Dobey 94.73	6
44	Geert Nentjes 91.95	1

Second round (best of 11 legs); 26 November
4	Dirk van Duijvenbode 100.69	6
29	Daryl Gurney 93.88	1
13	Ryan Searle 101.49	6
45	Jamie Hughes 91.71	1
5	Rob Cross 97.61	6
37	Gary Anderson 92.61	5
12	Martin Schindler 91.64	6
21	Chris Dobey 94.20	5

Third round (best of 19 legs); 26 November
4	Dirk van Duijvenbode 112.05	10
13	Ryan Searle 103.33	9
5	Rob Cross 92.60	10
12	Martin Schindler 91.47	6

Quarter-finals (best of 19 legs); 27 November
4	Dirk van Duijvenbode 94.62	3
5	Rob Cross 104.17	10

=== Bottom half ===
==== Section 3 ====
First round (best of 11 legs); 25 November
2	Luke Humphries 97.23	6
63	Nathan Rafferty 91.03	3
31	Jim Williams 96.80	4
34	Mike De Decker 97.38	6
15	Krzysztof Ratajski 91.14	6
50	William O'Connor 89.10	4
18	José de Sousa 93.41	6
47	Danny Jansen 85.01	2
7	Dave Chisnall 99.83	6
58	Niels Zonneveld 98.05	3
26	Scott Williams 92.85	6
39	Alan Soutar 88.63	4
10	Joe Cullen 92.19	6
55	Rowby-John Rodriguez 78.47	2
23	Kim Huybrechts 100.93	6
42	Raymond van Barneveld 95.21	4

Second round (best of 11 legs); 26 November
2	Luke Humphries 100.99	6
34	Mike De Decker 93.38	4
15	Krzysztof Ratajski 93.33	6
18	José de Sousa 84.20	1
7	Dave Chisnall 102.56	4
26	Scott Williams 93.04	6
10	Joe Cullen 92.84	6
23	Kim Huybrechts 84.00	1

Third round (best of 19 legs); 26 November
2	Luke Humphries 104.92	10
15	Krzysztof Ratajski 98.72	7
26	Scott Williams 90.81	7
10	Joe Cullen 99.09	10

Quarter-finals (best of 19 legs); 27 November
2	Luke Humphries 102.85	10
10	Joe Cullen 94.72	3

==== Section 4 ====
First round (best of 11 legs); 25 November
3	Nathan Aspinall 94.32	4
62	Martijn Kleermaker 89.30	6
30	Matt Campbell 91.37	6
35	Steve Beaton 93.13	3
14	Danny Noppert 106.59	6
51	Simon Whitlock 98.71	1
19	James Wade 89.06	6
46	Mensur Suljović 79.66	2
6	Michael Smith 98.22	5
59	Ritchie Edhouse 86.30	6
27	Dimitri Van den Bergh 88.41	6
38	Martin Lukeman 83.41	5
11	Josh Rock 96.16	3
54	Cameron Menzies 98.84	6
22	Michael van Gerwen 102.60	6
43	Ryan Meikle 96.71	3

Second round (best of 11 legs); 26 November
62	Martijn Kleermaker 89.58	4
30	Matt Campbell 93.37	6
14	Danny Noppert 97.67	6
19	James Wade 90.33	1
59	Ritchie Edhouse 91.82	5
27	Dimitri Van den Bergh 90.43	6
54	Cameron Menzies 87.45	4
22	Michael van Gerwen 96.45	6

Third round (best of 19 legs); 26 November
30	Matt Campbell 93.58	9
14	Danny Noppert 93.69	10
27	Dimitri Van den Bergh 92.57	6
22	Michael van Gerwen 105.98	10

Quarter-finals (best of 19 legs); 27 November
14	Danny Noppert 95.30	7
22	Michael van Gerwen 100.75	10

== Top averages ==
The table lists all players who achieved an average of at least 100 in a match. In the case one player has multiple records, this is indicated by the number in brackets.

#	Player	Round	Average	Result
1	Dirk van Duijvenbode	3R	112.05	Won
2	Danny Noppert	1R	106.59	Won
3	Michael van Gerwen	3R	105.98	Won
4	Luke Humphries	3R	104.92	Won
5	Rob Cross	QF	104.17	Won
6	Ryan Searle	3R	103.33	Lost
7	Luke Humphries (2)	QF	102.85	Won
8	Michael van Gerwen (2)	1R	102.60	Won
9	Dave Chisnall	2R	102.56	Lost
10	Martin Schindler	1R	102.17	Won
11	Michael van Gerwen (3)	SF	101.59	Won
12	Ryan Searle (2)	2R	101.49	Won
13	Luke Humphries (3)	2R	100.99	Won
14	Kim Huybrechts	1R	100.93	Won
15	Andrew Gilding	1R	100.91	Won
16	Michael van Gerwen (4)	QF	100.75	Won
17	Keane Barry	2R	100.70	Won
18	Dirk van Duijvenbode (2)	2R	100.69	Won
19	Rob Cross (2)	F	100.33	Lost
