= Prakash Jiwa =

Darts player (born 1970)

Personal information
- Nickname: The Apache
- Born: 21 May 1970 (age 56) Rugby, Warwickshire, England
- Home town: Rugby, Warwickshire

Sport
- Sport: Darts
- Playing since: 1990
- Darts: 23g Cuesoul
- Laterality: Right-handed
- Walk-on music: "Apache" by The Sugarhill Gang

Organisation (see split in darts)
- PDC: 2008–2023

PDC premier events – best performances
- World Championship: Last 96: 2023
- UK Open: Last 96: 2012, 2013

Prakash Jiwa (born 21 May 1970) is an English-Indian suspended darts player He has won a tour card through Qualifying School to compete in Professional Darts Corporation events on three occasions.

== PDC career ==
Jiwa qualified in 2010 as an amateur for the UK Open but lost in the first round to Simon Cunningham 6–4. He took part in the PDC Qualifying School in 2011 and earned a Tour Card to compete on the PDC Circuit full-time on the fourth and final day. In 2012 he reached the quarter-finals of two UK Open qualifiers to enter the tournament itself in the second round, where he lost 4–2 to Mark Barilli. Jiwa also reached the quarter-finals of the 12th Players Championship where he was edged out 6–5 by Michael van Gerwen.

In 2013, Jiwa could not advance beyond the last 32 in any tournament and lost 5–1 to Terry Temple in the second round of the UK Open. In September 2014 he won five games to play in the final of the 13th Challenge Tour event, but missed five darts for the title in the deciding leg to be defeated 5–4 by Mark Frost. He matched his best performance on the main PDC tour at the final Players Championship of the year by reaching the quarter-finals in a run which began with a 6–4 victory over five-time world champion Raymond van Barneveld. In the last eight he was whitewashed 6–0 by Peter Wright who averaged 108.65.

Jiwa won a new two-year tour card in January 2015 by finishing joint fifth on the Q School Order of Merit. The only European Tour event he could qualify for was the Dutch Darts Masters and he was defeated 6–4 by John Henderson in the first round. Jiwa did not progress past the last 32 of any tournament during the year.

The last 32 was the furthest he could reach in 2016 too, which he did in two Players Championship events.

In 2017 he had to enter Q School again in order to regain his tour card, and did so on the first day. This was the third time Jiwa had come through the event and he said, with the help of new equipment, he was aiming to get into the top 64 on the Order of Merit in the next two years. Jiwa entered the 2017 UK Open Qualifiers and picked up £250 on each of Qualifiers 3 and 6, but this proves insufficient to enter him in the 2017 UK Open. Jiwa hit poor form and claimed only £500 in prize money until the end of the season.

He won £750 in the sixth and final qualifier for the 2018 PDC UK Open, sealing a return to Butlin's Minehead Resort for the tournament. Unfortunately for him, the 'Apache' lost in a last leg decider in the First Round to Riley's Qualifier Jason Mold. Jiwa averaged 75.08 to Mold's 78.47. During 2018 Jiwa picked up £5,000 on the PDC Pro Tour from his participation in the Players Championship events, yet this did not assist him much in qualifying neither for the Players Championship Finals, nor the 2019 PDC World Darts Championship. Jiwa attempted to make his way to Alexandra Palace via the Tour Card Holders' Qualifier, but lost 4-6 to Madars Razma in the Last 12.

Jiwa failed to get past the Last 128 of any of the 4 PDC UK Q School events, which meant he was eligible to play only on the Challenge Your. His best run there came in the 2nd event, where he picked up £200 en route to the Last 16.

Jiwa returned to the 2020 PDC UK Q School, but runs to the Last 256, Last 16, Last 128 and a first round loss on the final day deprived him of any possibilities of returning on the professional circuit. Since then Jiwa has persisted playing only on the Challenge tour. He started to represent India instead of England in 2022, and he won Indian qualifier for World Championship beating Nitin Kumar in the final 6:4. That was his PDC World Championship debut at the age of 52. He lost in the first round to Madars Razma.

On 16 November 2023, Jiwa was one of three players suspended by the Darts Regulation Authority while an investigation was being carried out into suspicious betting patterns in the Modus Super Series. In early 2025 he was found guilty of match-fixing and illegal betting on darts matches, and sentenced to an eight-year ban.

== Personal life ==
Jiwa is based in Rugby, Warwickshire, and works as a warehouse manager.

== World Championship results ==
=== PDC ===
- 2023: First round (lost to Madars Razma 1–3)
