= Chris Dobey =

English darts player (born 1990)

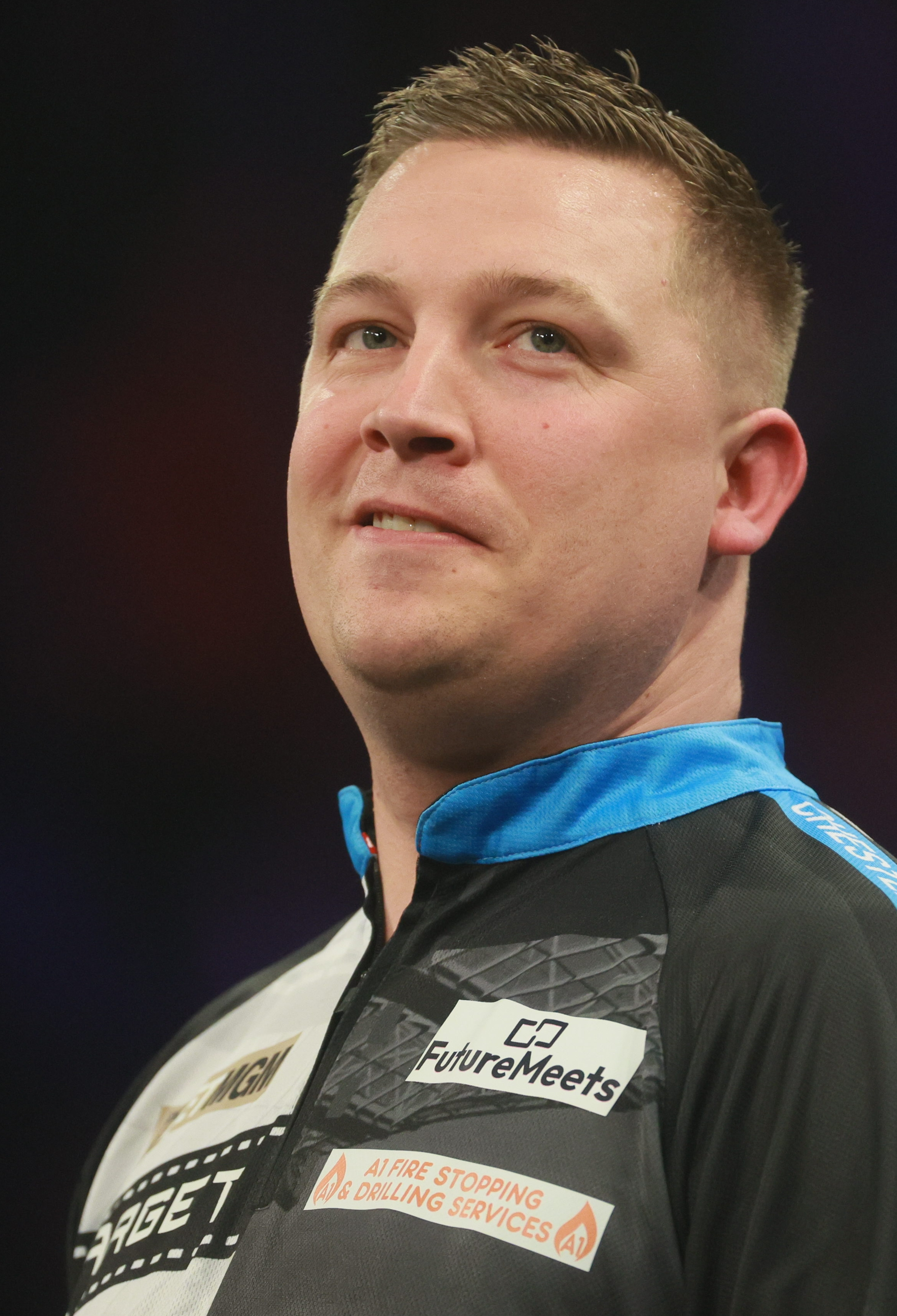
- Dobey in 2025

Personal information
- Nickname: "Hollywood"
- Born: 31 May 1990 (age 36) Bedlington, Northumberland, England

Sport
- Sport: Darts
- Playing since: 2010
- Darts: 23g Target Signature Gen 1
- Laterality: Right-handed
- Walk-on music: "Hey Jude" by The Beatles

Organisation (see split in darts)
- BDO: 2013–2015
- PDC: 2015–present (Tour Card: 2015–present)
- Current world ranking: (PDC) 15 ▲1 (22 November 2026)

WDF major events – best performances
- World Masters: Last 32: 2014

PDC premier events – best performances
- World Championship: Semi-final: 2025
- World Matchplay: Quarter-final: 2023
- World Grand Prix: Semi-final: 2019
- UK Open: Last 16: 2018, 2020, 2021
- Grand Slam: Quarter-final: 2016
- European Championship: Semi-final: 2022
- Premier League: 6th: 2025
- PC Finals: Semi-final: 2019
- Masters: Winner (1): 2023
- World Series Finals: Quarter-final: 2024, 2025

Other tournament wins
- Years
- Players Championships (×11); 2021 (×2), 2024 (×3), 2025 (×3), 2026 (×3)

Chris Dobey (born 31 May 1990) is an English professional darts player who competes in Professional Darts Corporation (PDC) events, where he is ranked world number fifteen; he reached a peak ranking of world number six in 2025. Nicknamed "Hollywood", he won his first major title at the 2023 Masters, defeating Rob Cross 11–7 in the final. A PDC Tour Card holder since 2015, Dobey has since won 11 PDC Players Championship titles.

He is a one-time World Championship semi-finalist, reaching the last four at the 2025 PDC World Championship.

== Early life ==
Dobey was born in Bedlington in 1990. He comes from a darting family; his father Gordon and uncle Arthur both played league darts. Prior to playing darts, Dobey worked in traffic management. He played football in the Northern Football Alliance with his local team.

== Career ==
Dobey started playing darts in 2010 at a local club. He received the nickname "Hollywood" due to wearing a baseball cap while playing darts.

=== 2015 ===
Dobey's first major TV appearance came in the 2015 UK Open where he lost to Nathan Aspinall 5–1 in the first round. At Players Championship 11 he had deciding leg victories over Jan Dekker, Kim Huybrechts and Max Hopp to reach the last 16 of a PDC event for the first time, where he was defeated by Mark Webster 6–2. Dobey qualified for the 2015 World Series of Darts Finals and lost in a last leg decider to Terry Jenkins 6–5.

=== 2016 ===
At the 2016 German Darts Masters, Dobey saw off Ben Davies 6–1 and then averaged 100.64 in a win over Robert Thornton and 102.25 whilst beating Dave Chisnall 6–4. In his first PDC quarter-final he averaged over 100 again, but lost to world number one Michael van Gerwen 6–5, having led 5–4. At Players Championship 19 Dobey beat Stephen Bunting 6–3 to reach the semi-finals and took out a 120 finish after Adrian Lewis had missed match darts. This meant he played in his first senior final, but lost Simon Whitlock 6–4. He qualified for the 2016 European Championship and was eliminated by Joe Cullen 6–2 in the first round. Dobey also played in the Grand Slam of Darts for the first time and wins over Lewis and Scott Mitchell saw him advance to the knockout stage, where he hit a ten dart leg to move 9–5 up on Jamie Hughes. However, Hughes closed the deficit to force a deciding leg which Dobey took to advance to his first major quarter-final, but he was outclassed by James Wade who won 16–5.

His performances gave him a PDC Pro Tour spot in the 2017 World Championship, where he beat Justin Pipe 3–1 in the first round. In the second round he lost to Dave Chisnall 4–2.

=== 2018 ===
At the 2018 World Championship, Dobey drew Phil Taylor in the first round. Taylor was appearing in his final World Championship following his decision to retire after the conclusion of the event. Dobey lost 3-1.

He played in the 2018 UK Open in Minehead, reaching the fifth round before losing out to Corey Cadby.

Dobey reached 2 finals on the Pro Tour in 2018, losing to Michael van Gerwen 6–2 in the final of Players Championship 5 despite having an average of over 109, and then losing to Krzysztof Ratajski 6–2 in the final of Players Championship 21. These performances aided him in qualifying for the 2018 Players Championship Finals where he had a run to the quarter-finals, losing out to eventual winner Daryl Gurney 10–2.

=== 2019 ===
He qualified for the 2019 PDC World Darts Championship via the Pro Tour, reaching the last 16 stage with 3–0 whitewash wins over Boris Koltsov, and Steve Beaton and a 4–3 win over Vincent van der Voort. He lost to Gary Anderson 4–3, in a match which saw 28 180s thrown, 15 of them by Dobey.

Following Gary Anderson's withdrawal from the 2019 Premier League, Dobey was selected as one of nine 'Contenders'. He would play a one-off match against Mensur Suljović on night one in Newcastle. Dobey started well leading 5–1 before Suljović would win 5 consecutive legs to lead 6–5. Dobey would win the final leg to draw the match 6–6.

Dobey reached his fourth PDC final at the 2019 Danish Darts Open, winning through as a non seed, but lost to Dave Chisnall 8–3.

He reached the semi-finals at both the 2019 World Grand Prix and 2019 Players Championship Finals.

=== 2020 ===
At the 2020 PDC World Darts Championship, Dobey was seeded into the second round for the first time as 22nd seed. He defeated Ron Meulenkamp 3–2 in his opening match. This set up a tie against Fallon Sherrock in the third round, who had beaten Ted Evetts to become the first woman to win a match at the PDC World Championship before eliminating 11th seed Mensur Suljović in the next round. In their match, Dobey came back from 2–1 down to defeat Sherrock 4–2. He then exited the tournament after a 4–3 loss to Glen Durrant.

Following the end of the World Championship, Dobey was once again selected as a 'Challenger' (re-brand of 'Contender') for the Premier League. He played on Night 7 in Milton Keynes where he lost 7–2 to Daryl Gurney.

=== 2021 ===
In 2021, Dobey won his first PDC ranking title at Players Championship 18 in Coventry. Along the way he defeated Jeff Smith, Luke Humphries, William Borland, Jonny Clayton, Stephen Bunting, Maik Kuivenhoven & José de Sousa. Dobey then went on to claim his 2nd ranking title at PC28 in Barnsley, he defeated Rob Cross in the semi-finals where the pair threw a combined average of 224.68 (111.73 for Dobey).

=== 2022 ===
At the 2022 PDC World Darts Championship, Dobey won his opening match 3–2 against Rusty-Jake Rodriguez. He was originally supposed to play Michael van Gerwen in the third round, but van Gerwen withdrew from the tournament after testing positive for COVID-19. Dobey received a bye to the fourth round, where he lost 4–3 to Luke Humphries despite leading the match 3–1. He avenged his loss to Humphries in the first round of the 2022 World Grand Prix, beating Humphries 2–0. He faced Adrian Lewis in the second round and won the match in a last-leg decider after Lewis missed a match dart on the bullseye. He was eliminated by Michael van Gerwen in the quarter-finals.

Dobey got a surprise win against Michael van Gerwen in the first round of the 2022 European Championship, beating him 6–5 and claiming his first ever career win against the three-time World Champion. He defeated José de Sousa in the next round and Dave Chisnall in the quarter-finals to reach his third televised semi-final. He lost to eventual champion Ross Smith 11–9.

=== 2023 ===
At the 2023 PDC World Darts Championship, Dobey reached a World Championship quarter-final for the first time. He defeated Martijn Kleermaker in his opening match before eliminating former World Champions Gary Anderson and Rob Cross. In the quarter-finals, he lost 5–0 to Michael van Gerwen. On 29 January 2023, Dobey reached his first televised final at the 2023 Masters. He beat reigning Masters champion Joe Cullen, Luke Humphries, Dirk van Duijvenbode and reigning World Champion Michael Smith before defeating Rob Cross 11–7 in the final. The following day, Dobey was confirmed to be in the 2023 Premier League, his first full-time inclusion in the event after two years as a 'Challenger'.

In his full-time Premier League debut, Dobey won night one with victories over Peter Wright and Nathan Aspinall before winning a last-leg decider in the final against Michael van Gerwen with a 160 checkout. His run to the night seven final included a historic 6–0 win over Michael van Gerwen, making Dobey the first player to whitewash van Gerwen in the Premier League. Dobey lost 6–4 to Gerwyn Price in the final. The next week on night eight, he played in front of his home crowd in Newcastle. Dobey marked the occasion with a special walk-on, using "Going Home: Theme of the Local Hero" by Mark Knopfler as his walk-on song due to the song's connection to Dobey's favourite football club Newcastle United. He won his opening match 6–4 against Michael Smith but lost to Gerwyn Price 6–4 in the semi-finals. Dobey only registered two more wins in the latter half of the league stage and finished in seventh place after being overtaken by Dimitri van den Bergh, who won night sixteen.

Dobey reached three consecutive quarter-finals in televised ranking events, beginning at the 2023 World Matchplay where he defeated James Wade and Michael Smith before losing 16–12 to eventual champion Nathan Aspinall. At the 2023 World Grand Prix, he beat Dimitri Van den Bergh in the first round and earned a 3–2 win over Michael van Gerwen in the next round to progress to the quarter-finals. Despite leading the match 2–1, he was eliminated after a 3–2 loss to Joe Cullen. Dobey lost to eventual champion Peter Wright in the quarter-finals of the 2023 European Championship. On 1 September 2023, Chris Dobey announced that he signed with darts manufacturer Target Darts.

=== 2024 ===
At the 2024 PDC World Championship, Dobey whitewashed defending champion Michael Smith 4–0 in the fourth round to reach his second consecutive World Championship quarter-final. He played Rob Cross for a place in the semi-finals and established a 4–0 lead, one set away from winning. However, Cross then won five consecutive sets to win 5–4, after Dobey missed one dart at bullseye to win 5-2.

Dobey topped the 2024 PDC Players Championship (PC) Order of Merit ranking, winning three titles. He won PC7, defeating Josh Rock 8–4 in the final. He hit a nine-dart finish in his third round win over Mickey Mansell. In August, Dobey won PC19, defeating Cameron Menzies 8–6 in the final. In October, he won PC25, defeating Stephen Bunting 8–3 in the final.

=== 2025 ===
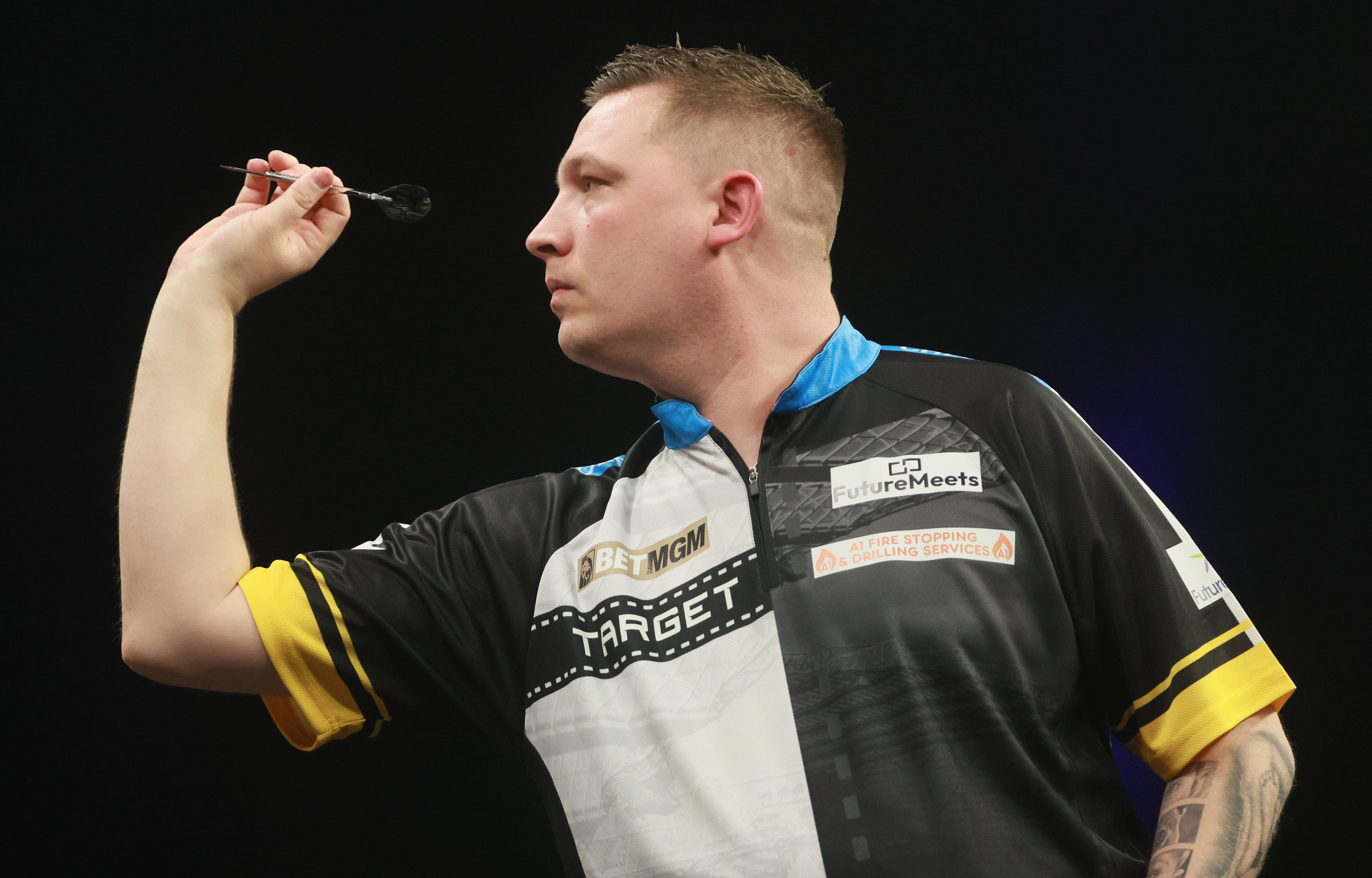
Dobey on night nine of the 2025 Premier League

Dobey made it three successive PDC World Championship quarter-finals at the 2025 event, defeating Alexander Merkx, Josh Rock and Kevin Doets along the way. In the quarter-finals, Dobey faced Gerwyn Price and went 2–0 down before leveling the match at 2–2. He won the next two sets to go 4–2 up but missed five match darts, allowing Price to reduce the gap to 4–3. However, he won the next set to win the match 5–3 and reach his first World Championship semi-final, where he was defeated 6-1 by Michael van Gerwen. He was subsequently announced as part of the 2025 Premier League line-up on 6 January.

After finishing as runner-up in the second Players Championship event, Dobey won his first title of the year at Players Championship 3, defeating Jelle Klaasen 8–4 in the final. He earned a sole nightly win during the 2025 Premier League on night 11 with a 6–2 victory over Stephen Bunting in the final. He finished the league stage in sixth place with 17 points. Dobey won his second Players Championship title of the year at the 17th event by beating Dirk van Duijvenbode 8–7 in the final. At the end of June, Dobey reached a career-high ranking of sixth in the PDC Order of Merit. He earned his third title of 2025 at the penultimate Players Championship event, defeating William O'Connor 8–6 in the final.

=== 2026 ===
Dobey defeated Xiaochen Zong 3–1 in the first round of the 2026 World Championship. He was eliminated from the tournament following a 3–1 loss to Andrew Gilding in the second round. Dobey won his first title of the year by defeating Stephen Bunting 8–1 in the final of Players Championship 3. Following a runner-up finish to Ross Smith at Players Championship 5, he achieved his 10th Players Championship title at Players Championship 9, beating Justin Hood 8–4 in the final.

== Personal life ==
Dobey is a supporter of Newcastle United. He has two sons born in 2017 and 2023.

== World Championship results ==
=== PDC World Championship ===
- 2017: Second round (lost to Dave Chisnall 2–4)
- 2018: First round (lost to Phil Taylor 1–3)
- 2019: Fourth round (lost to Gary Anderson 3–4)
- 2020: Fourth round (lost to Glen Durrant 3–4)
- 2021: Third round (lost to Daryl Gurney 1–4)
- 2022: Fourth round (lost to Luke Humphries 3–4)
- 2023: Quarter-finals (lost to Michael van Gerwen 0–5)
- 2024: Quarter-finals (lost to Rob Cross 4–5)
- 2025: Semi-finals (lost to Michael van Gerwen 1–6)
- 2026: Second round (lost to Andrew Gilding 1–3)

== Career finals ==
=== PDC major finals: 1 (1 title) ===
Legend
Masters (1–0)

Outcome	No.	Year	Championship	Opponent in the final	Score (Note: (l) = score in legs, (s) = score in sets.)
Winner	1.	2023	Masters	Rob Cross	11–7 (l)

== Performance timeline ==
Chris Dobey's performance timeline is as follows:

=== PDC ===
Tournament	2014	2015	2016	2017	2018	2019	2020	2021	2022	2023	2024	2025	2026
PDC Ranked televised events
World Championship	DNQ			2R	1R	4R	4R	3R	4R	QF	QF	SF	2R
World Masters (Note: Before 2025 this was a non ranked event.)	Did not qualify							2R	DNQ	W	2R	1R	QF
UK Open	1R	2R	DNQ	4R	5R	3R	6R	6R	4R	5R	5R	5R	4R
World Matchplay	Did not qualify					1R	DNQ	1R	1R	QF	2R	2R	1R
World Grand Prix	Did not qualify					SF	1R	DNQ	QF	QF	1R	1R	1R
European Championship	DNQ		1R	DNQ		2R	DNQ		SF	QF	1R	2R	1R
Grand Slam	DNQ		QF	Did not qualify				RR	DNQ	2R	DNQ	2R	RR
Players Championship Finals	DNQ		1R	3R	QF	SF	1R	1R	2R	2R	1R	QF	
PDC Non-ranked televised events
Premier League	Did not participate					C	C	DNP		7th	DNP	6th	DNP
World Series Finals	NH	1R	DNQ	2R	Did not qualify					DNP	QF	QF	1R
Career statistics
Year-end ranking	-	107	47	38	36	22	22	30	22	17	15	13	

==== European Tour ====
Season	1	2	3	4	5	6	7	8	9	10	11	12	13	14	15
2015	Did not participate						EDT; 1R	EDM; DNQ	EDG; DNQ						
2016	DDM; DNQ	GDM; QF	GDT; DNQ	EDM; 2R	ADO; 2R	EDO; DNQ	IDO; 2R	EDT; DNQ	EDG; DNQ	GDC; 1R					
2017	GDC; 1R	GDM; DNQ	GDO; DNQ	EDG; 1R	GDT; DNQ	EDM; 1R	ADO; 3R	Did not qualify				EDT; 2R			
2018	EDO; 3R	GDG; 2R	Did not qualify				GDT; 3R	DDO; 1R	EDM; 2R	Did not qualify					
2019	EDO; DNQ	GDC; DNQ	GDG; 1R	GDO; 2R	ADO; 2R	EDG; 2R	DDM; DNQ	DDO; F	CDO; 3R	ADC; 1R	EDM; DNQ	IDO; DNQ	GDT; 2R		
2020	BDC; DNQ	GDC; 2R	EDG; 1R	IDO; DNQ											
2022	IDO; DNQ	GDC; 2R	GDG; 2R	Did not qualify				DDC; 3R	EDM; 2R	HDT; 2R	GDO; DNQ	BDO; 1R	GDT; 2R		
2023	BSD; DNP	EDO; 2R	IDO; DNQ	GDG; 3R	ADO; 2R	DDC; DNQ	BDO; 2R	CDO; DNQ	EDG; 2R	EDM; DNP	GDO; DNQ	HDT; DNQ	GDC; 2R		
2024	BDO; 2R	GDG; 3R	IDO; SF	EDG; 2R	ADO; 2R	BSD; 1R	DDC; 3R	EDO; 3R	GDC; 3R	FDT; SF	HDT; 2R	SDT; 2R	CDO; 2R		
2025	BDO; 2R	EDT; 2R	IDO; 2R	GDG; DNP	ADO; QF	EDG; 2R	DDC; 2R	EDO; QF	BSD; SF	FDT; 2R	CDO; 2R	HDT; QF	SDT; 3R	GDC; 2R	
2026	PDO; SF	EDT; 3R	BDO; QF	GDG; WD	EDG; 3R	ADO; 2R	IDO; 2R	BSD; 2R	SDO; 3R	EDO; 2R	HDT; QF	CDO; 2R	FDT; QF	SDT; 2R	DDC; 2R

==== Players Championships ====
Season	1	2	3	4	5	6	7	8	9	10	11	12	13	14	15	16	17	18	19	20	21	22	23	24	25	26	27	28	29	30	31	32	33	34
2015	BAR; 3R	BAR; 1R	BAR; 2R	BAR; 1R	BAR; 1R	COV; 3R	COV; 3R	COV; 1R	CRA; DNP		BAR; 4R	BAR; 1R	WIG; 1R	WIG; 1R	BAR; 1R	BAR; 1R	DUB; 1R	DUB; 1R	COV; 1R	COV; 1R														
2016	BAR; 1R	BAR; 4R	BAR; 4R	BAR; 4R	BAR; 4R	BAR; 2R	BAR; 2R	COV; 2R	COV; 4R	BAR; 1R	BAR; 1R	BAR; 2R	BAR; 3R	BAR; 1R	BAR; 4R	BAR; QF	DUB; 3R	DUB; 2R	BAR; F	BAR; 1R														
2017	BAR; 3R	BAR; 3R	BAR; 3R	BAR; 3R	MIL; 2R	MIL; 1R	BAR; 1R	BAR; 2R	WIG; 1R	WIG; 2R	MIL; 3R	MIL; 2R	WIG; 1R	WIG; 3R	BAR; 3R	BAR; 1R	BAR; 1R	BAR; 1R	DUB; 2R	DUB; 1R	BAR; 1R	BAR; 3R												
2018	BAR; 2R	BAR; DNP	BAR; 1R	BAR; 1R	MIL; F	MIL; 3R	BAR; 4R	BAR; 1R	WIG; 1R	WIG; 1R	MIL; 2R	MIL; 2R	WIG; 1R	WIG; 2R	BAR; 4R	BAR; 2R	BAR; 2R	BAR; 1R	DUB; 1R	DUB; 1R	BAR; F	BAR; 4R												
2019	WIG; 1R	WIG; 4R	WIG; SF	WIG; 1R	BAR; 2R	BAR; 4R	WIG; 4R	WIG; 3R	BAR; 2R	BAR; 2R	BAR; 3R	BAR; 1R	BAR; 3R	BAR; 2R	BAR; QF	BAR; QF	WIG; 2R	WIG; 2R	BAR; 1R	BAR; 1R	HIL; 2R	HIL; 3R	BAR; 3R	BAR; 1R	BAR; 1R	BAR; 1R	DUB; 1R	DUB; 2R	BAR; 1R	BAR; 4R				
2020	BAR; 1R	BAR; 1R	WIG; QF	WIG; 2R	WIG; DNP		BAR; 3R	BAR; 1R	MIL; 2R	MIL; 3R	MIL; QF	MIL; 1R	MIL; 4R	NIE; 1R	NIE; 4R	NIE; 1R	NIE; 2R	NIE; 4R	COV; 2R	COV; 1R	COV; 1R	COV; 1R	COV; 2R											
2021	BOL; 4R	BOL; 1R	BOL; 1R	BOL; 1R	MIL; 2R	MIL; 1R	MIL; 2R	MIL; 1R	NIE; 1R	NIE; 1R	NIE; 4R	NIE; 1R	MIL; 2R	MIL; 4R	MIL; 1R	MIL; 1R	COV; 4R	COV; W	COV; 2R	COV; 3R	BAR; 2R	BAR; 2R	BAR; 3R	BAR; 4R	BAR; SF	BAR; 1R	BAR; 1R	BAR; W	BAR; 3R	BAR; 1R				
2022	BAR; 1R	BAR; 3R	WIG; 1R	WIG; 2R	BAR; 4R	BAR; 1R	NIE; 1R	NIE; 1R	BAR; QF	BAR; 2R	BAR; 1R	BAR; 3R	BAR; DNP	WIG; 2R	WIG; 3R	NIE; 4R	NIE; SF	BAR; 3R	BAR; 1R	BAR; 2R	BAR; 3R	BAR; 3R	BAR; QF	BAR; SF	BAR; 1R	BAR; 3R	BAR; 4R	BAR; 4R	BAR; 3R	BAR; 4R				
2023	BAR; 3R	BAR; 1R	BAR; 3R	BAR; 2R	BAR; 1R	BAR; 1R	HIL; 2R	HIL; 1R	WIG; 3R	WIG; 3R	LEI; 2R	LEI; QF	HIL; QF	HIL; 1R	LEI; 4R	LEI; 1R	HIL; 4R	HIL; 3R	BAR; 1R	BAR; 1R	BAR; QF	BAR; 3R	BAR; QF	BAR; 4R	BAR; 1R	BAR; QF	BAR; 2R	BAR; DNP	BAR; 3R	BAR; 2R				
2024	WIG; 3R	WIG; 4R	LEI; 3R	LEI; F	HIL; 3R	HIL; 2R	LEI; W	LEI; 4R	HIL; QF	HIL; 1R	HIL; DNP		MIL; 1R	MIL; 1R	MIL; SF	MIL; 2R	MIL; 2R	MIL; 3R	MIL; W	WIG; 4R	WIG; 1R	MIL; 2R	MIL; F	WIG; DNP	WIG; W	WIG; 2R	WIG; 4R	WIG; 1R	LEI; 4R	LEI; 2R				
2025	WIG; 2R	WIG; F	ROS; W	ROS; 2R	LEI; 2R	LEI; 2R	HIL; DNP		LEI; 2R	LEI; 3R	LEI; 4R	LEI; 1R	ROS; 2R	ROS; 4R	HIL; DNP		LEI; W	LEI; 3R	LEI; 3R	LEI; 4R	LEI; 2R	Did not participate						LEI; 3R	LEI; 3R	LEI; QF	WIG; 2R	WIG; QF	WIG; W	WIG; SF
2026	HIL; 2R	HIL; 1R	WIG; W	WIG; 2R	LEI; F	LEI; 3R	LEI; QF	LEI; QF	WIG; W	WIG; QF	MIL; 3R	MIL; QF	HIL; QF	HIL; 1R	LEI; 4R	LEI; DNP	LEI; 2R	LEI; 1R	MIL; 1R	MIL; 4R	WIG; QF	WIG; 2R	LEI; 3R	LEI; QF	HIL; 3R	HIL; 3R	LEI; 4R	LEI; 2R	ROS; QF	ROS; QF	ROS; 2R	ROS; W	LEI; 1R	LEI; 4R

Performance Table Legend
W	Won the tournament	F	Finalist	SF	Semifinalist	QF	Quarterfinalist	#R; RR; Prel.	Lost in # round Round-robin; Preliminary round	DQ	Disqualified
DNQ	Did not qualify	DNP	Did not participate	WD	Withdrew	NH	Tournament not held	#R; RR; Prel.	Lost in # round Round-robin; Preliminary round	NYF	Not yet founded
