= 2024 International Darts Open =

2024 NEO.bet International Darts Open

Tournament information
- Dates: 12–14 April 2024
- Venue: SACHSENarena
- Location: Riesa, Germany
- Organisation(s): Professional Darts Corporation (PDC)
- Format: Legs
- Prize fund: £175,000
- Winner's share: £30,000
- High checkout: 170; Owen Bates; Chris Dobey

Champion(s)
- Martin Schindler

The 2024 International Darts Open, known as the 2024 NEO.bet International Darts Open for sponsorship reasons, was a professional darts tournament that took place at the SACHSENarena in Riesa, Germany from 12 to 14 April 2024. It was the third of thirteen PDC European Tour events on the 2024 PDC Pro Tour. It featured a field of 48 players and £175,000 in prize money, with £30,000 going to the winner.

Gerwyn Price was the defending champion after defeating Michael van Gerwen 8–4 in the 2023 final.

Martin Schindler won his first European Tour title and first senior PDC title overall, beating Gerwyn Price 8–5 in the final. Schindler became the third German player to win a senior PDC title.

== Prize money ==
The prize fund remained at £175,000, with £30,000 to the winner:

Stage (num. of players)		Prize money
Winner	(1)	£30,000
Runner-up	(1)	£12,000
Semi-finalists	(2)	£8,500
Quarter-finalists	(4)	£6,000
Third round losers	(8)	£4,000
Second round losers	(16)	£2,500*
First round losers	(16)	£1,250*
Total	£175,000	

- Pre-qualified players from the Orders of Merit who lose in their first match of the event shall not be credited with prize money on any Order of Merit. A player who qualifies as a qualifier, but later becomes a seed due to the withdrawal of one or more other players shall be credited with their prize money on all Orders of Merit regardless of how far they progress in the event.

== Qualification and format ==
A massive overhaul in the qualification for the 2024 European Tour events was announced on 7 January.

For the first time, both the PDC Order of Merit and the PDC Pro Tour Order of Merit rankings were used to determine 32 of the 48 entrants for the event. The top 16 on the PDC Order of Merit qualified, along with the highest 16 ranked players on the PDC ProTour Order of Merit (after the PDC Order of Merit players were removed). From those 32 players, the 16 highest ranked players on the PDC ProTour Order of Merit were seeded for the event. The seedings were confirmed on 16 February.

The remaining 16 places went to players from four qualifying events – 10 from the Tour Card Holder Qualifier (held on 21 February), four from the Host Nation Qualifier (held on 17 February), one from the Nordic & Baltic Associate Member Qualifier (held on 17 February), and one from the East European Associate Member Qualifier (held on 11 February).

Michael van Gerwen and Gary Anderson withdrew and were replaced by Dylan Slevin and Lee Evans. Stephen Bunting and Joe Cullen moved up to become the 15th and 16th seeds respectively.

The following players took part in the tournament:

Seeded Players

1. Dave Chisnall (second round)
2. Luke Humphries (third round)
3. Gerwyn Price (runner-up)
4. Damon Heta (third round)
5. Dirk van Duijvenbode (second round)
6. Josh Rock (second round)
7. Rob Cross (third round)
8. Jonny Clayton (second round)
9. Danny Noppert (quarter-finals)
10. Michael Smith (second round)
11. Ross Smith (quarter-finals)
12. Krzysztof Ratajski (second round)
13. Ryan Searle (quarter-finals)
14. Ricardo Pietreczko (third round)
15. Stephen Bunting (semi-finals)
16. Joe Cullen (second round)

Order of Merit Qualifiers
- Nathan Aspinall (third round)
- Peter Wright (first round)
- Dimitri Van den Bergh (second round)
- Chris Dobey (semi-finals)
- Martin Schindler (champion)
- Andrew Gilding (first round)
- Daryl Gurney (second round)
- James Wade (second round)
- Gian van Veen (second round)
- Gabriel Clemens (third round)
- José de Sousa (second round)
- Brendan Dolan (second round)
- Raymond van Barneveld (first round)
- Luke Woodhouse (first round)

Tour Card Qualifier
- Mike De Decker (first round)
- Callan Rydz (second round)
- Mervyn King (first round)
- Ritchie Edhouse (quarter-finals)
- Jitse van der Wal (first round)
- Owen Bates (first round)
- Simon Whitlock (first round)
- Cameron Menzies (third round)
- William O'Connor (second round)
- Richard Veenstra (third round)

Host Nation Qualifier
- Michael Unterbuchner (second round)
- Patrick Klingelhöfer (first round)
- Kai Gotthardt (first round)
- Jan Dueckers (first round)

Nordic & Baltic Qualifier
- Cor Dekker (first round)

East European Qualifier
- Alexander Mašek (first round)

Reserve List
- Lee Evans (first round)
- Dylan Slevin (first round)

== Draw ==
Numbers to the left of players' names show the seedings for the top 16 in the tournament. The two reserves are indicated by (Alt). The figures to the right of a player's name state their three-dart average in a match. Players in bold denote match winners.

**First round** (best of 11 legs); 12 April
**Richard Veenstra 97.29**	**6**
Andrew Gilding 96.79	4
Jan Dueckers 69.46	1
**Martin Schindler 97.31**	**6**
Owen Bates 94.67	5
**Nathan Aspinall 96.89**	**6**
Alexander Mašek 85.16	2
**Dimitri Van den Bergh 93.98**	**6**
**Callan Rydz 82.55**	**6**
Alt	Lee Evans 75.83	1
**Daryl Gurney 92.02**	**6**
Patrick Klingelhöfer 75.42	0
**Gabriel Clemens 86.25**	**6**
Peter Wright 91.98	5
**Chris Dobey 96.78**	**6**
Alt	Dylan Slevin 101.36	1
**José de Sousa 98.13**	**6**
Cor Dekker 95.11	3
**Michael Unterbuchner 89.64**	**6**
Luke Woodhouse 83.11	4
**Gian van Veen 92.64**	**6**
Raymond van Barneveld 86.90	3
Jitse van der Wal 84.47	1
**Ritchie Edhouse 95.83**	**6**
Kai Gotthardt 102.22	2
**Brendan Dolan 103.85**	**6**
Mike De Decker 93.39	3
**James Wade 96.85**	**6**
**Cameron Menzies 101.20**	**6**
Simon Whitlock 92.39	4
**William O'Connor 92.81**	**6**
Mervyn King 87.34	3

**Second round** (best of 11 legs); 13 April
1	Dave Chisnall 96.27	2
**Richard Veenstra 95.77**	**6**
16	Joe Cullen 93.08	3
**Martin Schindler 105.05**	**6**
8	Jonny Clayton 98.21	2
**Nathan Aspinall 113.14**	**6**
**9**	**Danny Noppert 100.91**	**6**
Dimitri Van den Bergh 95.13	4
**4**	**Damon Heta 90.72**	**6**
Callan Rydz 83.28	1
**13**	**Ryan Searle 98.74**	**6**
Daryl Gurney 98.73	5
5	Dirk van Duijvenbode 83.79	4
**Gabriel Clemens 93.96**	**6**
12	Krzysztof Ratajski 99.60	4
**Chris Dobey 111.19**	**6**
**2**	**Luke Humphries 99.65**	**6**
José de Sousa 81.31	2
**15**	**Stephen Bunting 101.50**	**6**
Michael Unterbuchner 92.76	1
**7**	**Rob Cross 91.76**	**6**
Gian van Veen 91.50	5
10	Michael Smith 100.78	5
**Ritchie Edhouse 100.53**	**6**
**3**	**Gerwyn Price 96.86**	**6**
Brendan Dolan 92.98	4
**14**	**Ricardo Pietreczko 98.26**	**6**
James Wade 92.53	5
6	Josh Rock 95.36	5
**Cameron Menzies 92.35**	**6**
**11**	**Ross Smith 90.47**	**6**
William O'Connor 93.97	5

**Third round** (best of 11 legs); 14 April
Veenstra 92.94	1
**Schindler 97.09**	**6**
Aspinall 90.52	2
**9**	**Noppert 85.90**	**6**
4	Heta 100.27	5
**13**	**Searle 97.21**	**6**
Clemens 83.35	0
**Dobey 94.93**	**6**
2	Humphries 92.20	4
**15**	**Bunting 89.67**	**6**
7	Cross 95.60	4
**Edhouse 103.49**	**6**
**3**	**Price 115.74**	**6**
14	Pietreczko 102.61	3
Menzies 92.42	4
**11**	**R. Smith 89.90**	**6**

**Quarter-finals** (best of 11 legs); 14 April
**Schindler 95.92**	**6**
9	Noppert 95.19	5
13	Searle 98.69	2
**Dobey 104.26**	**6**
**15**	**Bunting 91.55**	**6**
Edhouse 91.07	5
**3**	**Price 96.56**	**6**
11	R. Smith 102.92	5

**Semi-finals** (best of 13 legs); 14 April
**Schindler 98.52**	**7**
Dobey 86.39	3
15	Bunting 97.86	5
**3**	**Price 96.75**	**7**

**Final** (best of 15 legs); 14 April
**Schindler 96.35**	**8**
3	Price 101.62	5
