= Lee Evans (darts player) =

English darts player (born 1988)

Personal information
- Nickname: "Evz"
- Born: 18 October 1988 (age 38) Swindon, Wiltshire, England
- Home town: Kempsford, Gloucestershire, England

Sport
- Sport: Darts
- Playing since: 2010
- Darts: 21g Mission
- Laterality: Right-handed
- Walk-on music: "How You Like Me Now?" by The Heavy

Organisation (see split in darts)
- BDO: 2014
- PDC: 2015–present (Tour Card: 2023–2024)

PDC premier events – best performances
- World Championship: Last 64: 2024
- UK Open: Last 64: 2015, 2016
- PC Finals: Last 64: 2023

Other tournament wins
- Years
Gosport Open	2015
Birmingham Open	2022
Andover Open	2023

Lee Evans (born 18 October 1988) is an English professional darts player who competes in Professional Darts Corporation (PDC) events.

== Career ==
=== 2015 ===
Evans failed to get a PDC Tour Card for 2015 after he could not get past the last 64 on any of the four days of Q-School. However, he did qualify for the 2015 UK Open, where he defeated Nick Fulwell and Ronny Huybrechts, before losing 9–4 to Vincent van der Voort in the third round, after being 4–1 ahead. Evans won the Gosport Open by beating Richard Kirby 4–1. In October he played in the European Darts Grand Prix and knocked out Jyhan Artut 6–3 and Terry Jenkins 6–4 to reach the last 16 of a PDC event for the first time, where he lost 6–3 to Ian White.

=== 2016 ===
Evans began 2016 by twice reaching the last 16 in the UK Open Qualifiers. He entered the main event at the second round stage and eliminated Rowby-John Rodriguez 6–2, but then lost 9–7 to Jamie Caven. He won through to the final of the 9th Challenge Tour event but was beaten 5–4 by Matt Padgett. He reached the last 16 of a main tour event for the third time this year at the 10th Players Championship with wins over Dave Ladley, Vincent van der Voort and Mervyn King, but was whitewashed 6–0 by Dave Chisnall.

=== 2023 ===
In January 2023, Evans won a two-year PDC Tour Card by finishing second on the UK Q-School Order of Merit.

Evans qualified for the 2023 Players Championship Finals as the 61st seed. He was defeated by 4th seed Dave Chisnall 6–2 in the first round.

=== 2024 ===
Evans qualified for the 2024 World Championship through the ProTour Order of Merit. On debut he whitewashed Sandro Eric Sosing 3–0 in sets, but was himself whitewashed 3–0 by the eventual champion, Luke Humphries, in the second round.

Evans made it to one PDC European Tour event in 2024, through the 2024 International Darts Open (ET3) Tour Card Holder qualifier. He defeated Jermaine Wattimena 6–5 in a deciding leg and Ronny Huybrechts 6–1. Evans lost in the final round of the qualifier to Mike De Decker 6–2, but was the highest ranked final round loser on the ProTour Order of Merit and entered the tournament as the first reserve, as a replacement for Michael van Gerwen. He lost to Callan Rydz 6–1 in the first round.

Evans finished outside on the qualifying places on the ProTour Order of Merit for the 2025 World Championship. He therefore participated in the PDPA’s Tour Card Holder Qualifier where he received a bye through the first round as the 9th seed. He defeated Arron Monk 6–3 but lost to Adam Hunt 6–5 in a deciding leg. This meant he failed to qualify for the World Championship and lost his Tour Card due to being outside of the top 65 with £66,750 in ranking money earned over two years.

== Personal life ==
Evans was a bricklayer and labourer to his father Steve before he quit in 2015 to concentrate on his darts career.

== World Championship results ==
=== PDC ===
- 2024: Second round (lost to Luke Humphries 0–3)

== Performance timeline ==
Tournament	2015	2016	2017	2018	2023	2024
PDC Ranked televised events
World Championship	Did not qualify					2R
UK Open	2R	3R	2R	2R	1R	3R
Players Championship Finals	Did not qualify				1R	DNQ
Career statistics
Year-end ranking	114	106	-	189	80	

=== PDC European Tour ===
Tournament	2015	2023	2024
European Grand Prix	3R	1R	DNQ
International Open	DNQ	2R	1R
German Grand Prix	NH	3R	DNQ
German Championship	DNQ	1R	DNQ

=== PDC Players Championships ===
Season	1	2	3	4	5	6	7	8	9	10	11	12	13	14	15	16	17	18	19	20	21	22	23	24	25	26	27	28	29	30
2021 (Note: Not a Tour card holder)	Did not participate														MIL; 1R	MIL; 1R	Did not participate													
2022	BAR; 4R	BAR; 4R	WIG; 3R	WIG; 2R	BAR; 2R	BAR; 2R	Did not participate					BAR; 1R	BAR; 2R	WIG; 1R	WIG; 1R	DNP			BAR; QF	BAR; 1R	BAR; 2R	BAR; DNP	BAR; 2R	BAR; 1R	Did not participate					
2023	BAR; 1R	BAR; 1R	BAR; 1R	BAR; 2R	BAR; 2R	BAR; 1R	HIL; 1R	HIL; 1R	WIG; 2R	WIG; 4R	LEI; 4R	LEI; 1R	HIL; 3R	HIL; 1R	LEI; 1R	LEI; 2R	HIL; 3R	HIL; 2R	BAR; 1R	BAR; 2R	BAR; 1R	BAR; 2R	BAR; 1R	BAR; 2R	BAR; 2R	BAR; 4R	BAR; 2R	BAR; 3R	BAR; 2R	BAR; 1R
2024	WIG; 4R	WIG; 1R	LEI; 2R	LEI; 2R	HIL; 2R	HIL; 1R	LEI; 1R	LEI; 2R	HIL; 2R	HIL; 1R	HIL; 3R	HIL; 2R	MIL; 1R	MIL; 2R	MIL; 4R	MIL; 1R	MIL; 1R	MIL; 1R	MIL; 2R	WIG; 1R	WIG; 2R	MIL; 1R	MIL; 4R	WIG; 1R	WIG; 1R	WIG; 2R	WIG; 1R	WIG; 1R	LEI; 1R	LEI; 1R

Performance Table Legend
W	Won the tournament	F	Finalist	SF	Semifinalist	QF	Quarterfinalist	#R; RR; Prel.	Lost in # round Round-robin; Preliminary round	DQ	Disqualified
DNQ	Did not qualify	DNP	Did not participate	WD	Withdrew	NH	Tournament not held	#R; RR; Prel.	Lost in # round Round-robin; Preliminary round	NYF	Not yet founded
