= 2024 PDC World Darts Championship =

2023/24 Paddy Power World Darts Championship

Tournament information
- Dates: 15 December 2023 – 3 January 2024
- Venue: Alexandra Palace
- Location: London, England
- Organisation(s): Professional Darts Corporation (PDC)
- Format: Sets; Final – first to 7 sets
- High checkout: 170; Luke Humphries (x2); Lee Evans; Ross Smith; Danny Noppert; Jermaine Wattimena; Scott Williams; Luke Littler

Champion(s)
- Luke Humphries (ENG)

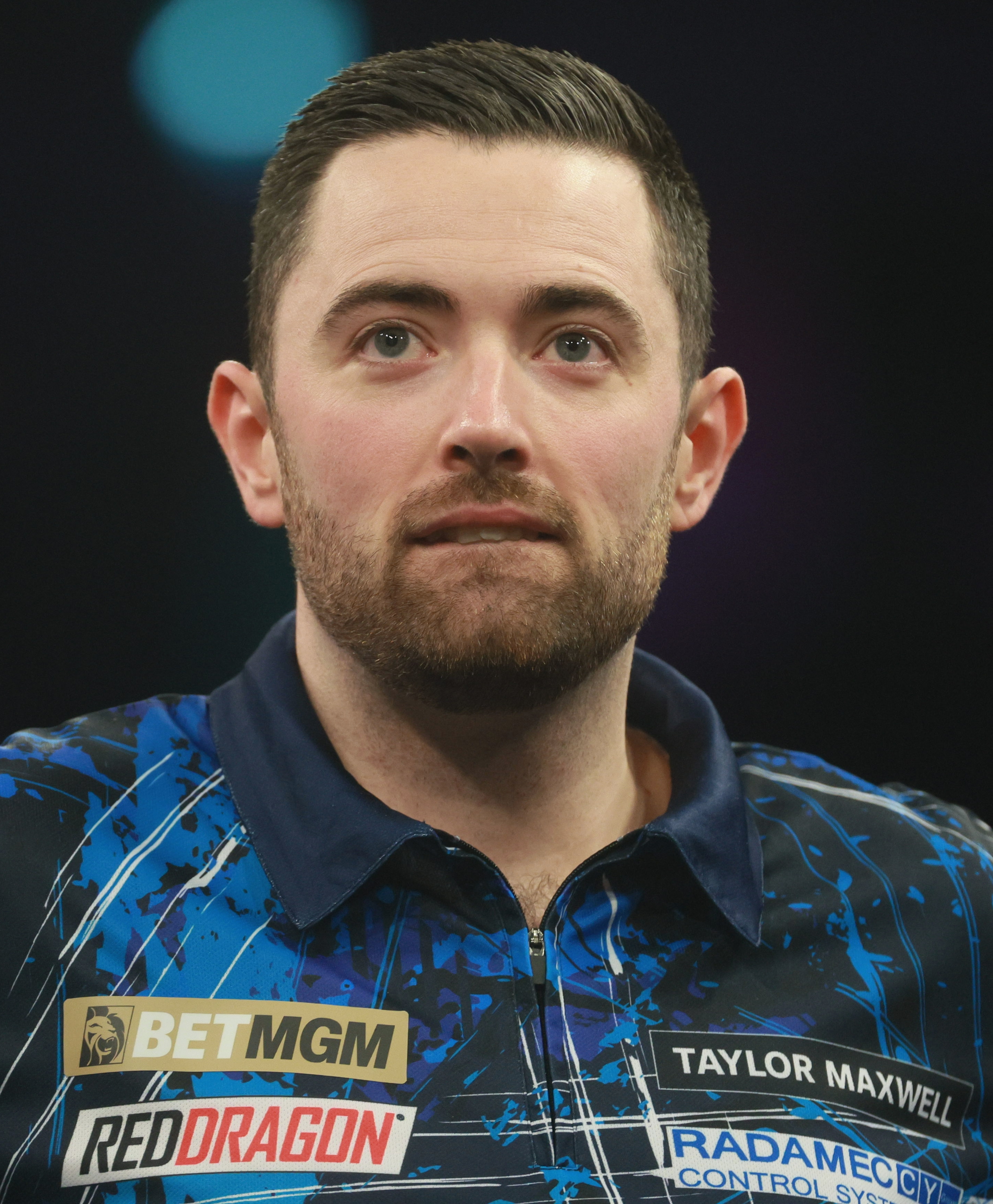
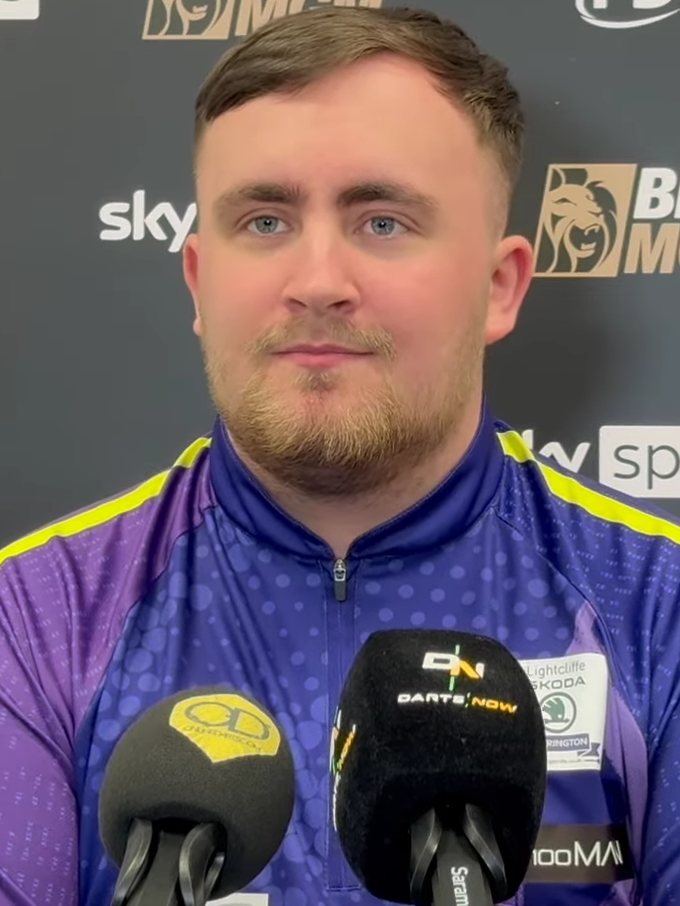
Luke Humphries won the world championship for the first time in his career, defeating 16-year old debutant Luke Littler in the final.

The 2024 PDC World Darts Championship (known for sponsorship reasons as the 2023/24 Paddy Power World Darts Championship) was a professional darts event that took place at Alexandra Palace in London, England, from 15 December 2023 to 3 January 2024. It was the thirty-first World Darts Championship to be organised by the Professional Darts Corporation.

Michael Smith was the defending champion, having defeated Michael van Gerwen 7–4 in the 2023 final. Smith lost 4–0 to Chris Dobey in the fourth round. For the first time since the 2006 event, all four semi-finalists (Rob Cross, Luke Humphries, Luke Littler and Scott Williams) were English. For the first time since the 2010 event, two unseeded players (Littler and Williams) reached the final four.

The third seed Luke Humphries won his first World Championship title, defeating 16-year-old debutant Luke Littler 7–4 in the final. He also became world number 1 for the first time in his career. The event sponsor pledged to donate £1,000 to the charity Prostate Cancer UK for every 180 scored during the tournament. The tournament set a new record for the most 180s achieved (914), raising £914,000 for the charity, which was ultimately rounded to £1,000,000. Humphries scored the most 180s at the event (73), winning the inaugural Ballon d'Art trophy for the achievement.

Steve Beaton made a record-extending 33rd consecutive and final World Championship appearance, but lost in the second round to Daryl Gurney. After 28 years with the PDC, referee Russ Bray retired at the end of the tournament after officiating his last televised ranking match in the world final.

== Overview ==
The 2024 PDC World Darts Championship was the 31st World Darts Championship organised by the Professional Darts Corporation, and the 17th to be held at Alexandra Palace, London. It took place from 15 December 2023 to 3 January 2024 as the culminating event of the 2023 Professional Darts Corporation season. The championship featured 96 players, with the top 32 highest ranked players on the PDC Order of Merit seeded through to the second round. Players ranked 33rd to 64th on the Order of Merit, and 32 other players from various qualifiers, started in the first round.

Following the withdrawal of previous title sponsor Cazoo in July 2023, bookmaker Paddy Power agreed a three-year deal to sponsor the event. As part of its promotion of the event, Paddy Power announced that the triple 20 would be changed from its traditional red to green, although this would later be revealed to be a hoax to raise awareness of the Big 180 campaign, for which the bookmaker would donate £1,000 to charity Prostate Cancer UK for every maximum score of 180 achieved during the tournament. Additionally, the Irish betting provider inaugurated the Ballon d'Art for the player who achieved the most maximum scores throughout the event.

Going into the event, Luke Humphries was viewed by players and bookmakers as the tournament favourite, having won three majors since October—the World Grand Prix, the Grand Slam of Darts, and the Players Championship Finals. Sky Sports pundit Wayne Mardle backed Humphries to win the event, describing him as "the best player on the planet", while former player Paul Nicholson described him as "a world number one in waiting".

Defending champion Michael Smith was seen as unlikely to defend his title after a disappointing season, especially since he changed his darts supplier during the summer. Smith himself acknowledged he was a likely target for players to up their game and eliminate him. Going into the event, Smith began practicing with Nathan Aspinall in an effort to rectify his lack of practice throughout the year, which he attributed to a busier lifestyle following his championship win.

=== Format ===
All matches were played as straight in, double out, requiring the players to score 501 points to win a leg, finishing on a double. The matches were played in the set format, with a minimum of three sets required to win a match. The following rules were observed:

- All sets were played to the best of five legs in the first round, and also in non-deciding sets of subsequent rounds.
- In the deciding set of all but the first round, the first player to win at least three legs and be leading by two or more won the set and the match. If the set reached a 5–5 tie without a winner, it was decided by a sudden-death leg with no throw for the bull.

Round	Best of (sets)	First to (sets)
First & Second	5	3
Third & Fourth	7	4
Quarter-finals	9	5
Semi-finals	11	6
Final	13	7

=== Ranking ===
Rankings in the PDC Order of Merit are calculated on a two-year basis. Most of the players were defending their PDC Order of Merit prize money from the 2022 PDC World Darts Championship. At the end of the tournament, the PDC Order of Merit prize money from that event was deleted from their rankings. After the tournament, the top 64 in the PDC Order of Merit received a one-year extension on their tour card. The players in the final year of their tour card who finished the tournament outside the top 64 lost their tour card, unless players inside the top 64 resigned their tour card.

=== Prize money ===
The total prize pool for the tournament remained at £2.5 million in total for the sixth year in a row.

Position (no. of players)		Prize money (Total: £2,500,000)
Winner	(1)	£500,000
Runner-up	(1)	£200,000
Semi-finalists	(2)	£100,000
Quarter-finalists	(4)	£50,000
Fourth round losers	(8)	£35,000
Third round losers	(16)	£25,000
Second round losers	(32)	£15,000
First round losers	(32)	£7,500

== Qualification ==
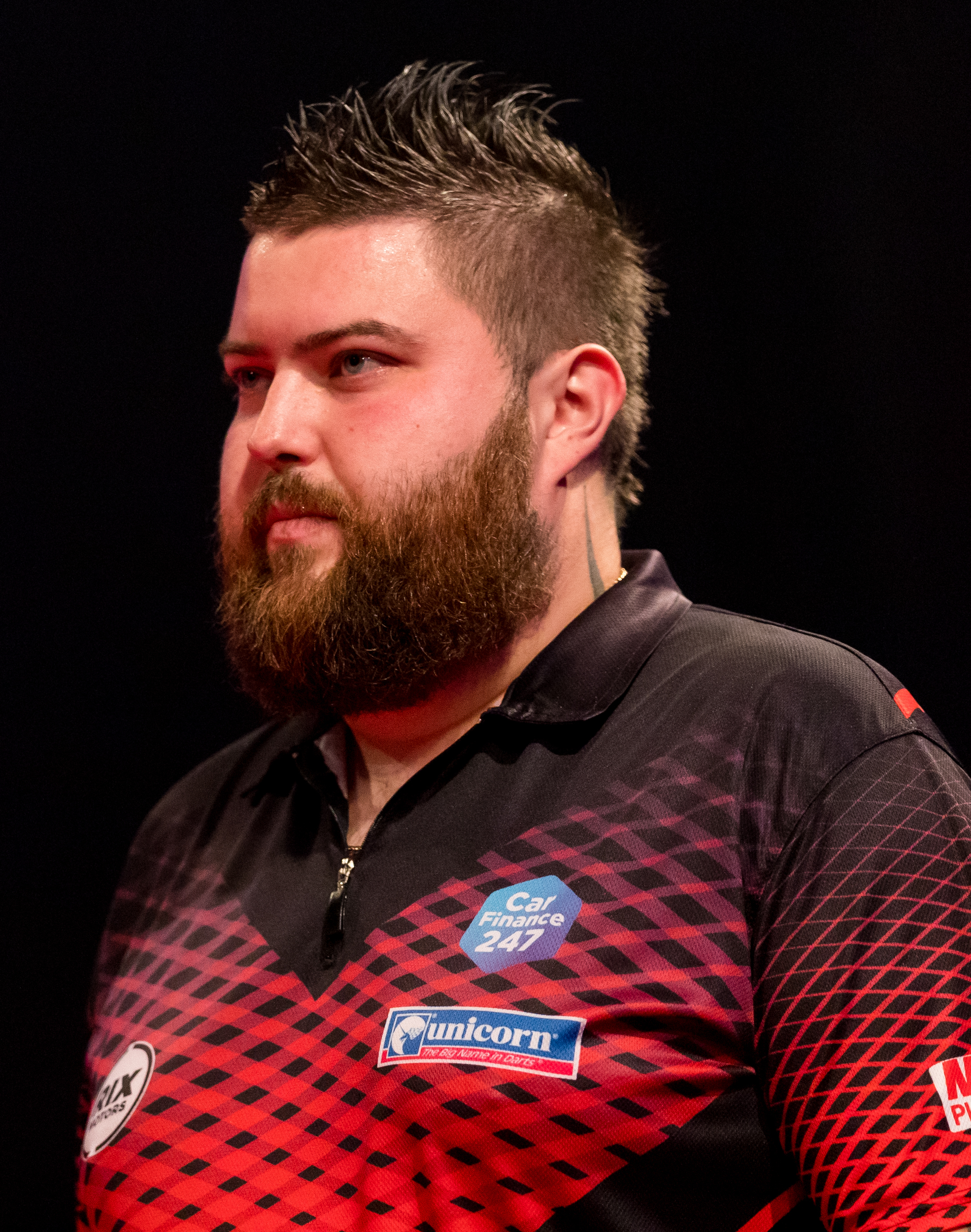
Defending champion Michael Smith was number one seed going into the tournament.

=== Seeding ===
The previous year's winner Michael Smith was top of the two-year PDC Order of Merit and number one seed going into the tournament. Michael van Gerwen, the three-time World Champion from 2014, 2017 and 2019, was the second seed, having won two major titles in 2023, the Premier League and the World Series of Darts Finals. Luke Humphries, winner of three of the last four ranked premier events in 2023, the World Grand Prix, Grand Slam and the Players Championship Finals, was the third seed. The 2022 world champion Peter Wright, who was also champion in 2020 and won the 2023 European Championship, was the fourth seed. As well as Smith, van Gerwen and Wright, four other previous PDC world champions qualified as seeds: 2021 world champion Gerwyn Price was the 5th seed, 2018 world champion Rob Cross was the 8th seed, 2015 and 2016 world champion Gary Anderson was seeded 21st, and 2007 world champion Raymond van Barneveld was seeded 29th. 2014 BDO World Champion Stephen Bunting qualified as 18th seed. He was one of two former BDO champions to qualify as seeds, alongside four-time BDO champion van Barneveld.

The top seeds behind Smith, van Gerwen, Humphries, Wright and Price were 2023 World Matchplay champion Nathan Aspinall, 2022 UK Open champion Danny Noppert, Rob Cross, and Jonny Clayton, who, alongside Gerwyn Price, won the 2023 PDC World Cup of Darts. Other 2023 major event champions to qualify as seeds were Masters champion Chris Dobey at 17th, with 2023 UK Open winner Andrew Gilding three places below him at 20th.

=== Pro Tour qualification ===
Ricardo Pietreczko, the winner of the 2023 German Darts Championship, was the highest-ranked non-seed on the 2023 PDC Pro Tour Order of Merit in his first World Championship participation. Gian van Veen, the 2023 World Youth runner up and a European Championship semi-finalist, and 2023 ProTour event winners Ryan Joyce and Radek Szagański were also amongst the qualifiers.

As well as Pietreczko, Van Veen and Szagański, other players qualifying for their PDC World Championship debuts were Mario Vandenbogaerde, Richard Veenstra, Kevin Doets, Connor Scutt, Dylan Slevin, Lee Evans, Jules van Dongen. Other players qualifying via the Pro Tour included 2010 runner-up Simon Whitlock, 1996 BDO champion Steve Beaton, and the 2012 BDO champion Christian Kist. Beaton qualified for a record-extending 33rd consecutive World Championship appearance.

=== International qualifiers ===
The final group of 32 qualifiers were determined by a series of international qualifiers and secondary tours. The PDC Asian Tour was held for the first time since 2019, and provided qualifiers for both the World Championship and the Asian Championship; the Professional Darts Japan qualifier was replaced with a place via the Asian Championship being reserved for a Japanese player. The Ukrainian qualifier that had been held for the first time in qualification for the previous year was discontinued, and the South West and West Europe qualifiers were combined.

Luke Littler, the 2023 World Youth Champion, and Wessel Nijman qualified from the 2023 PDC Development Tour series. Fallon Sherrock, the only woman to have previously won a match at the PDC World Darts Championship, and two-time BDO Women's World Champion Mikuru Suzuki qualified via the 2023 PDC Women's Series. In a rule change, the PDC announced that no player was eligible to compete in the 2024 PDC World Championship had they played at the 2023 WDF World Darts Championship which concluded a week earlier. Beau Greaves, the winner of the 2023 Women's World Matchplay, chose not to compete in the PDC Championship for which she had qualified, instead opting for the WDF. Prakash Jiwa, the winner of the Indian Qualifier, was suspended by the Darts Regulation Authority on 16 November 2023 while an investigation is conducted into suspicious betting in the independent Modus Super Series. Jiwa was replaced by the runner-up of the Indian Qualifier, Bhav Patel on 25 November 2023. The final four places were awarded by a qualifier for non-qualified PDC Tour Card holders.

Debutants via the international and invitation qualifiers were Simon Adams, Owen Bates, Stowe Buntz, Tomoya Goto, Man Lok Leung, Luke Littler, Wessel Nijman, Sandro Eric Sosing, Bhav Patel, Berry van Peer, Darren Penhall, Reynaldo Rivera, Alex Spellman and Thibault Tricole; Tricole was the first ever player from France to qualify for a PDC World Championship.

=== List of qualifiers ===
Order of Merit
Second round (seeded)

1. Michael Smith (fourth round)
2. Michael van Gerwen (quarter-finals)
3. Luke Humphries (champion)
4. Peter Wright (second round)
5. Gerwyn Price (third round)
6. Nathan Aspinall (second round)
7. Danny Noppert (second round)
8. Rob Cross (semi-finals)
9. Jonny Clayton (fourth round)
10. Damon Heta (fourth round)
11. Dave Chisnall (quarter-finals)
12. Dirk van Duijvenbode (second round)
13. James Wade (second round)
14. Joe Cullen (fourth round)
15. Dimitri Van den Bergh (second round)
16. Ross Smith (third round)
17. Chris Dobey (quarter-finals)
18. Stephen Bunting (fourth round)
19. Ryan Searle (third round)
20. Andrew Gilding (second round)
21. Gary Anderson (fourth round)
22. Gabriel Clemens (third round)
23. Josh Rock (second round)
24. Krzysztof Ratajski (third round)
25. José de Sousa (second round)
26. Martin Schindler (third round)
27. Daryl Gurney (fourth round)
28. Brendan Dolan (quarter-finals)
29. Raymond van Barneveld (fourth round)
30. Callan Rydz (second round)
31. Kim Huybrechts (second round)
32. Madars Razma (third round)

Pro Tour Order of Merit
First round

1. Ricardo Pietreczko (third round)
2. Gian van Veen (first round)
3. Ryan Joyce (second round)
4. Luke Woodhouse (first round)
5. Mike De Decker (second round)
6. Ian White (first round)
7. Jim Williams (third round)
8. Mario Vandenbogaerde (first round)
9. Radek Szagański (second round)
10. Richard Veenstra (third round)
11. Steve Beaton (second round)
12. Keane Barry (second round)
13. Simon Whitlock (second round)
14. Kevin Doets (second round)
15. Matt Campbell (third round)
16. Connor Scutt (second round)
17. Martin Lukeman (second round)
18. Mickey Mansell (second round)
19. Dylan Slevin (first round)
20. Steve Lennon (second round)
21. William O'Connor (second round)
22. Scott Williams (semi-finals)
23. Christian Kist (first round)
24. Ricky Evans (third round)
25. Cameron Menzies (second round)
26. Lee Evans (second round)
27. Ritchie Edhouse (first round)
28. Jermaine Wattimena (second round)
29. Jules van Dongen (first round)
30. Jamie Hughes (second round)
31. Niels Zonneveld (second round)
32. Keegan Brown (first round)

International Qualifiers
First round

- Simon Adams – African Qualifier (first round)
- Owen Bates – PDC Challenge Tour (first round)
- Stowe Buntz – CDC Pro Tour (first round)
- David Cameron – CDC Pro Tour (first round)
- Tomoya Goto – PDC Asian Tour (second round)
- Jeffrey de Graaf – PDC Nordic & Baltic (third round)
- ~~Beau Greaves – Women's World Matchplay (Note: Greaves chose to play the 2023 WDF World Darts Championship following a ruling by the PDC which did not allow players to compete in both World Championships in the same year.)~~ (withdrew)
- Florian Hempel – PDC TCH Qualifier (third round)
- Dragutin Horvat – PDC Europe Super League (first round)
- Lourence Ilagan – PDC Asian Tour (first round)
- Marko Kantele – PDC Nordic & Baltic (first round)
- Krzysztof Kciuk – East Europe Qualifier (first round)
- Boris Krčmar – PDC TCH Qualifier (third round)
- Man Lok Leung – PDC Asian Tour (second round)
- Luke Littler – PDC Development Tour (runner-up)
- Norman Madhoo – CLDC Pro Tour (first round)
- Haruki Muramatsu – PDC Asian Championship (first round)
- Paolo Nebrida – PDC Asian Tour (first round)
- Wessel Nijman – PDC Development Tour (first round)
- Bhav Patel – Indian Qualifier (Note: The original qualifier Prakash Jiwa was suspended by the Darts Regulation Authority on 16 November 2023 due to an investigation into suspicious betting on matches in the independently-operated Modus Super Series. Jiwa was replaced by the runner-up of the Indian Qualifier on 25 November 2023.) (first round)
- Berry van Peer – PDC Challenge Tour (third round)
- Darren Penhall – DPA Pro Tour (second round)
- Haupai Puha – Oceanic Masters (first round)
- Reynaldo Rivera – PDC Asian Tour (first round)
- Ben Robb – DPNZ Qualifier (first round)
- Rusty-Jake Rodriguez – PDC TCH Qualifier (first round)
- Fallon Sherrock – PDC Women's Series (first round)
- Sandro Eric Sosing – PDC Asian Championship (first round)
- Alex Spellman – CDC Pro Tour (first round)
- Mikuru Suzuki – PDC Women's Series (first round)
- Thibault Tricole – West Europe Qualifier (second round)
- Darren Webster – PDC TCH Qualifier (first round)
- Xiaochen Zong – PDC China Premier League (first round)

== Summary ==
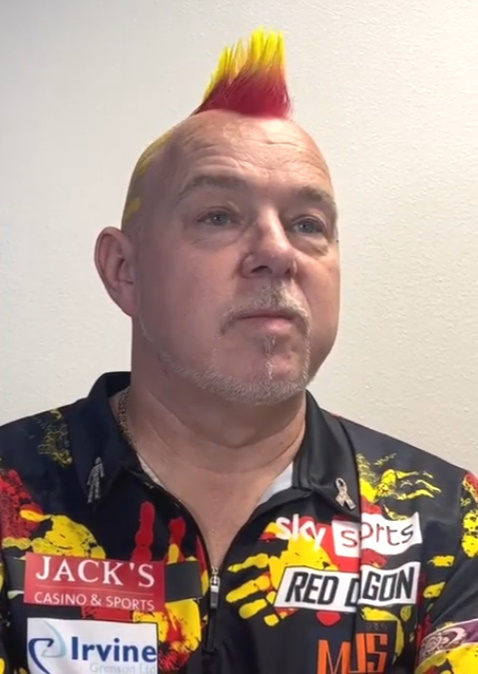
Former champion Peter Wright was the highest seeded player to be eliminated in his first match.

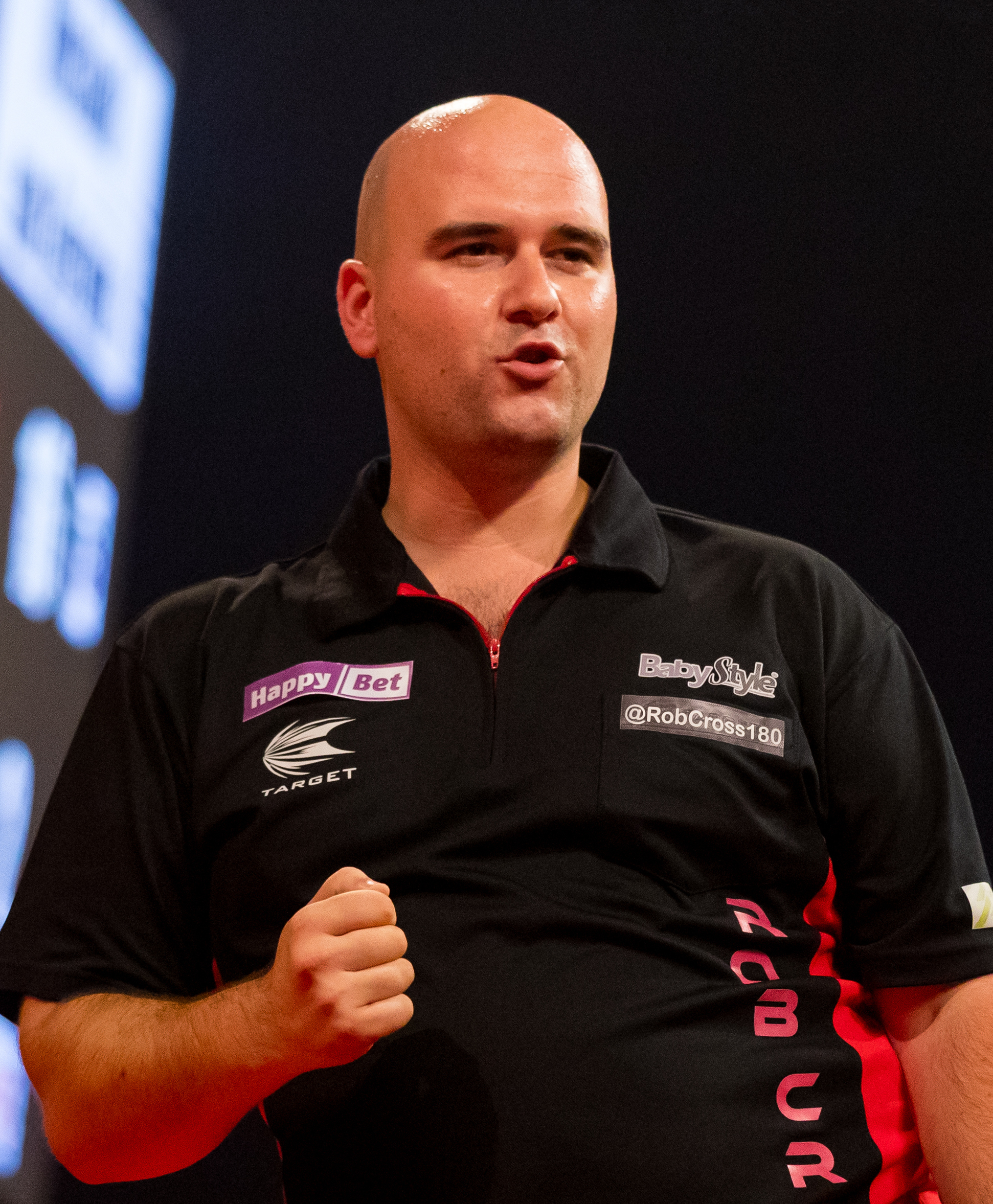
Former champion Rob Cross reached the World Championship semi-final for the second time in his career.

=== Opening rounds ===
The tournament began on 15 December, with defending champion Michael Smith avoiding a shock on the opening night at the hands of Dutch qualifier Kevin Doets, winning 3–2. James Wade was the first seeded player eliminated from the tournament, losing 3–2 to Canadian Matt Campbell. Fourth seed and former two-time champion Peter Wright suffered a 3–0 defeat to Jim Williams, who had whitewashed Guyanan Norman Madhoo in his opening match.

16 year old Luke Littler made history by averaging 106.2 in a 3–0 win against Dutchman Christian Kist, the highest ever achieved by a débutant at the event, and followed this by defeating 2023 UK Open champion Andrew Gilding 3–1 in the second round. 2023 World Matchplay champion Nathan Aspinall also suffered a 3–0 defeat, being eliminated by Ricky Evans.

In total, 11 seeds were eliminated in the second round; in addition to Wade, Wright, Gilding, and Aspinall, Danny Noppert, Dirk van Duijvenbode, Dimitri van den Bergh, Josh Rock, Jose de Sousa, Callan Rydz and Kim Huybrechts all lost their first game.

Thibault Tricole became the first French player to win a game at the PDC World Championship, defeating Belgian Mario Vandenbogaerde 3–1, before being eliminated in round two by 2018 world champion Rob Cross.

=== Third round ===
Former world champion Gerwyn Price was the highest ranked player to be eliminated in the third round, going down 4–2 to Brendan Dolan. Two unseeded players made it through to the fourth round, 16-year old Luke Littler continuing his debut run with a 4–1 victory over Matt Campbell and Scott Williams defeated Martin Schindler in a match which went all seven sets.

Luke Humphries, one of the pre-tournament favourites, survived a scare against Ricardo Pietreczko, rallying from 3–1 down to triumph 4–3. Damon Heta also beat Berry van Peer in another game to go the distance, while world champion Michael Smith and former champions Michael van Gerwen, Rob Cross, Gary Anderson and Raymond van Barneveld all continued their attempts to win the tournament for another time.

=== Fourth round ===
Reigning champion Michael Smith's campaign to retain his title ended in the fourth round, being beaten 4–0 by Chris Dobey. Gary Anderson was also eliminated 4–3 by Brendan Dolan, while Raymond van Barneveld was knocked out 4–1 by Luke Littler, in a match that attracted considerable attention, with BBC Sport unusually running a liveblog of the match and highlighting the fact that Littler had not been born the previous occasion that Van Barneveld had won the World Championship.

Littler's fellow unseeded player Scott Williams also made the quarter-finals, eliminating Damon Heta. Luke Humphries again had to battle, going all the way to a sudden-death final leg against Joe Cullen before breaking his opponent's throw and keeping his Championship hopes alive. Rob Cross reached the quarter-final for the first time since his 2018 triumph with a 4–0 victory over Jonny Clayton, and Michael van Gerwen also had a 4–0 win over Stephen Bunting. Dave Chisnall completed the quarter-final lineup with victory over Daryl Gurney.

=== Quarter-finals ===
The quarter-finals were held on New Year's Day. The first to be played was between Rob Cross and Chris Dobey. Dobey took the first set against the throw and made a dominant start, going up 4–0. Cross fought back and held the next set, before breaking the Dobey throw to pull back to 4–2. The last leg of the seventh set saw Dobey miss one dart at bullseye to win the match before Cross took the set and again broke the Dobey throw to level the match. Cross won the first two legs of the final set to take the lead for the first time in the match before Dobey took the next two to bring the match into extra legs. Cross won the seventh leg in ten darts and took advantage of a missed dart by Dobey to break in the eighth set and win the match, qualifying for the semi-final for the second time in his career.

The second game was between Brendan Dolan and Luke Littler. Littler won the first set despite Dolan taking a 2–0 lead, before breaking throw in the second set to take control of the match. Littler won the next two sets to solidify his lead. Despite Dolan breaking back in the fifth set 3–1, Littler took all three legs in the sixth set to secure the victory and continue his debut run. The result confirmed that Littler would finish the tournament in the top 64 of the PDC Order of Merit, meaning he would carry his ranking money into the next season and meaning his previously secured two-year tour card was instead given to Nathan Rafferty. Littler was the first debutant to reach the semi-final since Nathan Aspinall at the 2019 tournament.

In the third quarter-final between Michael van Gerwen and Scott Williams, the first two sets went with throw before van Gerwen broke in the third set after Williams missed five darts at doubles to win the set. Williams however won the next six legs in a row to reverse the set lead to 3–2. Van Gerwen re-established himself in the match by winning the next set 3–0 but Williams won the seventh set to go one away. Williams again broke throw in the third leg of the eighth set and held the advantage to eliminate the three-time world champion and qualify for the first semi-final of his career. He and Littler were the first semi-finalists to have been unseeded going into the tournament since Aspinall in 2019.

The final quarter-final was between Luke Humphries and Dave Chisnall. The first three sets went with throw but in the fourth set, after Chisnall took the first two legs to seemingly maintain the pattern, he missed two darts to hold the set and Humphries turned it around to get the match's first set break. Humphries held throw in the fifth set and then broke again in the sixth set to secure a 5–1 victory and qualify for his first World Championship semi-final.

=== Semi-finals ===
In the first semi-final, Rob Cross played Luke Littler. Cross had throw in the first set and won it, before breaking in the third leg of the second set. Cross, however, missed one set dart in the next leg and Littler was able to come back and win the set, before breaking in the first leg of the third set, which he went on to win. Littler again held throw in the fourth set and missed one dart to take the fifth set, which Cross won. Littler took the sixth set and then broke Cross in the third leg of the seventh set to go one away. The eighth set went the distance, before Littler took out a finish of 80 to complete a 6–2 victory and qualify for the final. Littler was the first debutant to reach a final since Cross himself in 2018, and the first unseeded player to do so since Kirk Shepherd in 2008.

In the second semi-final, Scott Williams played Luke Humphries. Williams broke the Humphries throw in the first leg of the first set, but Humphries broke straight back in the next leg and was able to hold the first set. He broke the Williams throw twice in the second set to take it 3–0 before completing the highest possible 170 finish in the first leg of the third set, taking the set after Williams had missed a dart at the bullseye to break. Humphries extended his lead further after breaking throw in the final leg of the fourth set, before taking the fifth set 3–0. Humphries broke again in the third leg of the sixth set and took out a 20 finish in the next leg to wrap up a 6–0 sets victory and qualify for his first World Championship final and his fourth final in the last five PDC premier ranked events. The result confirmed that Humphries would, for the first time, move to number one on the PDC Order of Merit following the tournament.

=== Final ===
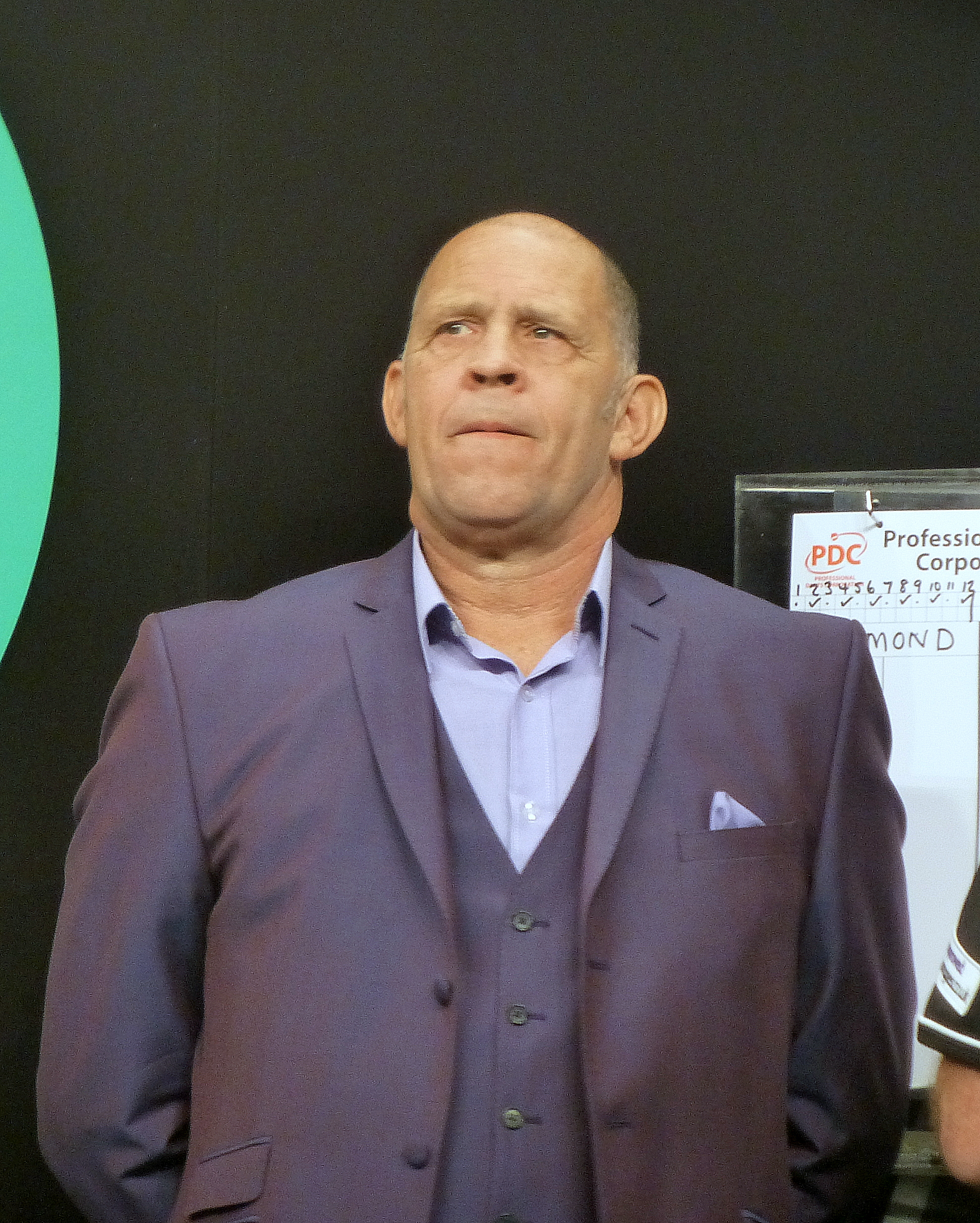
Russ Bray refereed the final of his 28th and final World Championship.

The final between Luke Littler and Luke Humphries was held on 3 January 2024. It was the final World Championship game for referee Russ Bray, who announced his intention to retire from refereeing ranked events prior to the tournament. Prior to the match, Bray was inducted into the PDC Hall of Fame.

Littler had the throw at the start of the first set; but lost the throw to Humphries in the third leg, who won the set 3–1. Humphries broke the Littler throw again in the second leg of the second set, but Littler broke back in the third leg after Humphries missed a dart for the set, before breaking again in the fifth leg with a 120 finish to level the match. In the third set, Littler broke throw in the second leg but Humphries broke back in the third leg and broke again in the fifth leg to re-take the match lead. Littler, however, levelled up the match again after breaking in the first leg of set 4, before taking the match lead for the first time after winning the fifth set 3–1. Littler then took the sixth set without dropping a leg to go into a 4–2 lead.

The seventh set went entirely against throw, with Littler ultimately missing one dart at double to take a 5–2 set lead and allowed Humphries to instead bring the match back to 4–3. Humphries won the eighth set 3–1 to bring the match level before breaking throw in the final leg of the ninth set to re-take the lead. Humphries got to one set away with a 3–1 win in the tenth set. The first four legs of the eleventh set went with throw before Littler missed three darts at double to take the final leg, before Humphries hit double 8 to win his first World Championship. This was Humphries' fourth premier tournament victory in four months, having won the World Grand Prix, Grand Slam and Players Championship Finals prior to the tournament. Humphries went to the number 1 spot on the PDC Order of Merit for the first time following the tournament, whilst Littler rose 133 places to go 31st.

== Schedule ==
Friday, 15 December

Match no.	Round	Player 1	Score	Player 2	Set 1	Set 2	Set 3	Set 4	Set 5
Evening session (19:00 GMT)
01	1	Kevin Doets 91.79	3–0	Stowe Buntz 88.26	3–1	3–1	3–2	—N/a	
02	1	Cameron Menzies 88.49	3–0	Rusty-Jake Rodriguez 81.83	3–0	3–2	3–2	—N/a	
03	1	Simon Whitlock 90.13	3–2	Paolo Nebrida 90.15	0–3	3–2	3–1	1–3	3–1
04	2	Michael Smith 100.09	3–2	Kevin Doets 99.46	3–1	2–3	2–3	3–1	3–1

Saturday, 16 December

Match no.	Round	Player 1	Score	Player 2	Set 1	Set 2	Set 3	Set 4	Set 5
Afternoon session (12:30 GMT)
05	1	Lee Evans 85.02	3–0	Sandro Eric Sosing 75.59	3–1	3–0	3–2	—N/a	
06	1	Connor Scutt 95.97	3–0	Krzysztof Kciuk 91.82	3–0	3–2	3–1	—N/a	
07	1	Jules van Dongen 90.72	1–3	Darren Penhall 91.29	2–3	3–1	0–3	1–3	—N/a
08	2	Dave Chisnall 90.94	3–1	Cameron Menzies 87.32	0–3	3–2	3–0	3–2	—N/a
Evening session (19:00 GMT)
09	1	Jamie Hughes 81.36	3–1	David Cameron 82.19	3–2	2–3	3–2	3–0	—N/a
10	1	Keane Barry 86.68	3–1	Reynaldo Rivera 87.38	3–1	3–2	0–3	3–1	—N/a
11	1	Scott Williams 90.69	3–1	Haruki Muramatsu 90.43	3–2	3–0	0–3	3–2	—N/a
12	2	Gary Anderson 98.29	3–0	Simon Whitlock 88.38	3–0	3–1	3–2	—N/a	

Sunday, 17 December

Match no.	Round	Player 1	Score	Player 2	Set 1	Set 2	Set 3	Set 4	Set 5
Afternoon session (12:30 GMT)
13	1	Ricky Evans 92.34	3–0	Simon Adams 75.89	3–2	3–0	3–0	—N/a	
14	1	Jim Williams 87.84	3–0	Norman Madhoo 73.20	3–0	3–0	3–0	—N/a	
15	1	Matt Campbell 93.14	3–2	Lourence Ilagan 86.03	3–1	3–1	2–3	2–3	3–0
16	2	Joe Cullen 93.41	3–0	Darren Penhall 81.24	3–1	3–2	3–1	—N/a	
Evening session (19:00 GMT)
17	1	Dylan Slevin 90.21	1–3	Florian Hempel 91.06	3–1	2–3	2–3	1–3	—N/a
18	1	Niels Zonneveld 79.86	3–1	Darren Webster 84.29	3–0	3–2	2–3	3–2	—N/a
19	1	Jermaine Wattimena 90.99	3–1	Fallon Sherrock 87.32	2–3	3–1	3–0	3–2	—N/a
20	2	Luke Humphries 93.58	3–0	Lee Evans 92.33	3–1	3–2	3–2	—N/a	

Monday, 18 December

Match no.	Round	Player 1	Score	Player 2	Set 1	Set 2	Set 3	Set 4	Set 5
Evening session (19:00 GMT)
21	1	Mario Vandenbogaerde 85.59	1–3	Thibault Tricole 85.21	3–2	2–3	2–3	2–3	—N/a
22	1	Gian van Veen 87.53	2–3	Man Lok Leung 96.26	3–2	3–2	1–3	1–3	1–3
23	1	Martin Lukeman 92.03	3–1	Haupai Puha 88.45	3–0	3–1	2–3	3–0	—N/a
24	2	Gerwyn Price 98.01	3–0	Connor Scutt 88.83	3–0	3–0	3–2	—N/a	

Tuesday, 19 December

Match no.	Round	Player 1	Score	Player 2	Set 1	Set 2	Set 3	Set 4	Set 5
Afternoon session (12:30 GMT)
25	1	Ian White 93.39	1–3	Tomoya Goto 90.71	2–3	2–3	3–1	0–3	—N/a
26	1	Ritchie Edhouse 89.23	2–3	Jeffrey de Graaf 93.29	3–2	3–2	2–3	2–3	1–3
27	1	Keegan Brown 82.97	1–3	Boris Krčmar 91.05	3–2	0–3	0–3	2–3	—N/a
28	2	James Wade 92.30	2–3	Matt Campbell 96.28	3–1	1–3	3–1	0–3	1–3
Evening session (19:00 GMT)
29	1	Steve Beaton 92.01	3–1	Wessel Nijman 92.82	3–1	3–2	0–3	3–2	—N/a
30	1	Mike De Decker 94.34	3–0	Dragutin Horvat 83.65	3–1	3–1	3–2	—N/a	
31	1	Ricardo Pietreczko 92.37	3–0	Mikuru Suzuki 78.27	3–0	3–1	3–0	—N/a	
32	2	Michael van Gerwen 98.17	3–0	Keane Barry 95.81	3–1	3–1	3–0	—N/a	

Wednesday, 20 December

Match no.	Round	Player 1	Score	Player 2	Set 1	Set 2	Set 3	Set 4	Set 5
Afternoon session (12:30 GMT)
33	1	Radek Szagański 82.40	3–2	Marko Kantele 78.47	3–1	2–3	2–3	3–1	3–0
34	1	Steve Lennon 88.75	3–2	Owen Bates 86.51	1–3	2–3	3–1	3–1	3–1
35	1	William O'Connor 98.74	3–0	Bhav Patel 82.00	3–0	3–0	3–0	—N/a	
36	2	Ross Smith 95.01	3–1	Niels Zonneveld 90.75	3–0	3–2	2–3	3–1	—N/a
Evening session (19:00 GMT)
37	1	Ryan Joyce 100.32	3–1	Alex Spellman 95.46	0–3	3–2	3–1	3–0	—N/a
38	1	Richard Veenstra 85.29	3–0	Ben Robb 89.51	3–2	3–1	3–2	—N/a	
39	1	Christian Kist 90.55	0–3	Luke Littler 106.12	0–3	1–3	1–3	—N/a	
40	2	Peter Wright 83.87	0–3	Jim Williams 90.45	2–3	2–3	0–3	—N/a	

Thursday, 21 December

Match no.	Round	Player 1	Score	Player 2	Set 1	Set 2	Set 3	Set 4	Set 5
Afternoon session (12:30 GMT)
41	1	Mickey Mansell 89.94	3–0	Xiaochen Zong 85.22	3–2	3–0	3–1	—N/a	
42	1	Luke Woodhouse 92.18	2–3	Berry van Peer 93.87	2–3	3–2	1–3	3–2	0–3
43	2	Madars Razma 91.33	3–1	Mike De Decker 89.94	3–0	1–3	3–2	3–2	—N/a
44	2	Rob Cross 89.32	3–0	Thibault Tricole 85.39	3–0	3–2	3–0	—N/a	
Evening session (19:00 GMT)
45	2	Andrew Gilding 92.09	1–3	Luke Littler 92.65	2–3	2–3	3–0	1–3	—N/a
46	2	Danny Noppert 94.13	0–3	Scott Williams 94.01	2–3	2–3	1–3	—N/a	
47	2	Gabriel Clemens 90.66	3–1	Man Lok Leung 92.56	3–1	3–2	0–3	3–0	—N/a
48	2	Damon Heta 89.69	3–1	Martin Lukeman 87.66	3–2	3–0	1–3	3–0	—N/a

Friday, 22 December

Match no.	Round	Player 1	Score	Player 2	Set 1	Set 2	Set 3	Set 4	Set 5
Afternoon session (12:30 GMT)
49	2	Brendan Dolan 95.13	3–2	Mickey Mansell 95.36	3–2	0–3	3–2	1–3	6–5
50	2	José de Sousa 93.82	1–3	Jeffrey de Graaf 94.22	3–2	2–3	1–3	0–3	—N/a
51	2	Krzysztof Ratajski 89.82	3–1	Jamie Hughes 85.74	2–3	3–2	3–2	3–1	—N/a
52	2	Dirk van Duijvenbode 94.57	1–3	Boris Krčmar 96.84	3–1	0–3	1–3	0–3	—N/a
Evening session (19:00 GMT)
53	2	Dimitri Van den Bergh 90.77	2–3	Florian Hempel 91.78	3–2	3–1	2–3	2–3	0–3
54	2	Martin Schindler 96.93	3–1	Jermaine Wattimena 89.85	3–1	3–1	2–3	3–0	—N/a
55	2	Raymond van Barneveld 99.81	3–1	Radek Szagański 93.64	3–1	3–0	2–3	3–2	—N/a
56	2	Chris Dobey 103.09	3–2	William O'Connor 97.22	3–1	1–3	3–1	1–3	3–1

Saturday, 23 December

Match no.	Round	Player 1	Score	Player 2	Set 1	Set 2	Set 3	Set 4	Set 5
Afternoon session (12:30 GMT)
57	2	Kim Huybrechts 84.77	0–3	Richard Veenstra 99.46	0–3	0–3	0–3	—N/a	
58	2	Callan Rydz 96.65	2–3	Ricardo Pietreczko 99.27	0–3	3–2	0–3	3–1	0–3
59	2	Jonny Clayton 88.45	3–1	Steve Lennon 86.67	2–3	3–1	3–2	3–0	—N/a
60	2	Daryl Gurney 100.79	3–1	Steve Beaton 91.16	3–0	3–1	2–3	3–2	—N/a
Evening session (19:00 GMT)
61	2	Ryan Searle 91.11	3–1	Tomoya Goto 85.62	3–0	3–2	2–3	3–0	—N/a
62	2	Josh Rock 91.87	1–3	Berry van Peer 91.32	1–3	2–3	3–2	1–3	—N/a
63	2	Stephen Bunting 107.28	3–0	Ryan Joyce 90.25	3–0	3–2	3–1	—N/a	
64	2	Nathan Aspinall 90.54	0–3	Ricky Evans 99.38	1–3	0–3	1–3	—N/a	

Wednesday, 27 December

Match no.	Round	Player 1	Score	Player 2	Set 1	Set 2	Set 3	Set 4	Set 5	Set 6	Set 7
Afternoon session (12:30 GMT)
65	3	Scott Williams 94.13	4–3	Martin Schindler 94.82	1–3	0–3	3–0	3–2	0–3	3–1	4–2
66	3	Dave Chisnall 95.49	4–1	Gabriel Clemens 96.16	3–1	3–0	3–1	1–3	3–2	—N/a	
67	3	Rob Cross 101.32	4–2	Jeffrey de Graaf 91.95	3–2	3–0	2–3	3–2	1–3	3–1	—N/a
Evening session (19:00 GMT)
68	3	Matt Campbell 91.29	1–4	Luke Littler 97.19	0–3	0–3	2–3	3–2	1–3	—N/a	
69	3	Michael van Gerwen 101.39	4–0	Richard Veenstra 86.20	3–1	3–1	3–2	3–0	—N/a		
70	3	Michael Smith 93.73	4–1	Madars Razma 87.78	2–3	3–1	3–1	3–2	3–1	—N/a	

Thursday, 28 December

Match no.	Round	Player 1	Score	Player 2	Set 1	Set 2	Set 3	Set 4	Set 5	Set 6	Set 7
Afternoon session (12:30 GMT)
71	3	Florian Hempel 93.79	0–4	Stephen Bunting 101.15	2–3	1–3	2–3	1–3	—N/a		
72	3	Joe Cullen 96.51	4–2	Ryan Searle 93.94	3–1	3–1	0–3	2–3	3–2	3–2	—N/a
73	3	Ross Smith 103.33	2–4	Chris Dobey 102.36	1–3	1–3	3–2	3–1	2–3	1–3	—N/a
Evening session (19:00 GMT)
74	3	Gerwyn Price 95.76	2–4	Brendan Dolan 95.73	2–3	3–1	2–3	3–0	2–3	2–3	—N/a
75	3	Luke Humphries 91.38	4–3	Ricardo Pietreczko 91.02	3–1	1–3	2–3	0–3	3–2	3–1	3–0
76	3	Ricky Evans 93.23	2–4	Daryl Gurney 93.53	3–1	2–3	3–2	2–3	2–3	1–3	—N/a

Friday, 29 December

Match no.	Round	Player 1	Score	Player 2	Set 1	Set 2	Set 3	Set 4	Set 5	Set 6	Set 7
Afternoon session (12:30 GMT)
77	3	Damon Heta 96.06	4–3	Berry van Peer 88.29	0–3	2–3	3–0	3–2	3–1	1–3	3–1
78	3	Jonny Clayton 91.55	4–2	Krzysztof Ratajski 92.94	3–1	3–2	0–3	3–1	1–3	3–1	—N/a
79	3	Jim Williams 91.71	1–4	Raymond van Barneveld 89.16	2–3	3–2	0–3	0–3	2–3	—N/a	
Evening session (19:00 GMT)
80	3	Boris Krčmar 94.80	1–4	Gary Anderson 99.29	3–2	1–3	2–3	1–3	0–3	—N/a	
81	4	Michael van Gerwen 99.80	4–0	Stephen Bunting 94.84	3–2	3–2	3–1	3–1	—N/a		
82	4	Michael Smith 102.47	0–4	Chris Dobey 102.43	1–3	2–3	0–3	1–3	—N/a		

Saturday, 30 December

Match no.	Round	Player 1	Score	Player 2	Set 1	Set 2	Set 3	Set 4	Set 5	Set 6	Set 7
Afternoon session (12:30 GMT)
83	4	Scott Williams 92.96	4–1	Damon Heta 92.50	3–2	1–3	3–2	3–1	3–2	—N/a	
84	4	Daryl Gurney 91.03	2–4	Dave Chisnall 98.98	2–3	2–3	3–2	3–0	0–3	1–3	—N/a
85	4	Rob Cross 98.41	4–0	Jonny Clayton 90.89	3–1	3–0	3–1	3–2	—N/a		
Evening session (19:30 GMT)
86	4	Brendan Dolan 94.01	4–3	Gary Anderson 93.38	3–0	3–1	1–3	1–3	1–3	3–1	3–1
87	4	Raymond van Barneveld 99.61	1–4	Luke Littler 105.01	1–3	1–3	2–3	3–2	2–3	—N/a	
88	4	Luke Humphries 99.23	4–3	Joe Cullen 98.66	2–3	0–3	3–1	3–2	2–3	3–0	6–5

Monday, 1 January

Match no.	Round	Player 1	Score	Player 2	Set 1	Set 2	Set 3	Set 4	Set 5	Set 6	Set 7	Set 8	Set 9
Afternoon session (12:30 GMT)
89	QF	Chris Dobey 99.84	4–5	Rob Cross 100.70	3–1	3–2	3–0	3–0	1–3	1–3	2–3	1–3	3–5
90	QF	Luke Littler 101.93	5–1	Brendan Dolan 86.45	3–2	3–0	3–2	3–1	1–3	3–0	—N/a		
Evening session (19:00 GMT)
91	QF	Michael van Gerwen 93.41	3–5	Scott Williams 96.32	0–3	3–1	3–2	0–3	0–3	3–0	1–3	1–3	—N/a
92	QF	Luke Humphries 103.50	5–1	Dave Chisnall 97.38	3–1	2–3	3–1	3–2	3–2	3–0	—N/a		

Tuesday, 2 January

Match no.	Round	Player 1	Score	Player 2	Set 1	Set 2	Set 3	Set 4	Set 5	Set 6	Set 7	Set 8	Set 9	Set 10	Set 11
Evening session (19:30 GMT)
93	SF	Rob Cross 102.77	2–6	Luke Littler 106.05	3–2	2–3	1–3	2–3	3–2	1–3	1–3	2–3	—N/a		
94	SF	Scott Williams 94.93	0–6	Luke Humphries 108.74	2–3	0–3	2–3	2–3	0–3	1–3	—N/a				

Wednesday, 3 January

Match no.	Round	Player 1	Score	Player 2	Set 1	Set 2	Set 3	Set 4	Set 5	Set 6	Set 7	Set 8	Set 9	Set 10	Set 11	Set 12	Set 13
Evening session (20:00 GMT)
95	F	Luke Littler 101.13	4–7	Luke Humphries 103.67	1–3	3–2	2–3	3–1	3–1	3–0	2–3	1–3	2–3	1–3	2–3	—N/a	

== Draw ==
The draw was held on 27 November 2023 and was conducted by former world champions Dennis Priestley and Phil Taylor.

=== Finals ===
Quarter-finals (best of 9 sets); 1 January
17	Chris Dobey 99.84	4
8	Rob Cross 100.70	5
Q	Luke Littler 101.93	5
28	Brendan Dolan 86.45	1
2	Michael van Gerwen 93.41	3
Scott Williams 96.32	5
3	Luke Humphries 103.50	5
11	Dave Chisnall 97.38	1

Semi-finals (best of 11 sets); 2 January
8	Rob Cross 102.77	2
Q	Luke Littler 106.05	6
Scott Williams 94.93	0
3	Luke Humphries 108.74	6

Final (best of 13 sets); 3 January
Q	Luke Littler 101.13	4
3	Luke Humphries 103.67	7

=== Top half ===
==== Section 1 ====
First round (best of 5 sets); 15–21 December
Kevin Doets 91.79	3
Q	Stowe Buntz 88.26	0
Mike De Decker 94.34	3
Q	Dragutin Horvat 83.65	0
Niels Zonneveld 79.86	3
Q	Darren Webster 84.29	1
William O'Connor 98.74	3
Q	Bhav Patel 82.00	0
Mario Vandenbogaerde 85.59	1
Q	Thibault Tricole 85.21	3
Ritchie Edhouse 89.23	2
Q	Jeffrey de Graaf 93.29	3
Steve Lennon 88.75	3
Q	Owen Bates 86.51	2
Jamie Hughes 81.36	3
Q	David Cameron 82.19	1

Second round (best of 5 sets); 15–23 December
1	Michael Smith 100.09	3
Kevin Doets 99.46	2
32	Madars Razma 91.33	3
Mike De Decker 89.94	1
16	Ross Smith 95.01	3
Niels Zonneveld 90.75	1
17	Chris Dobey 103.09	3
William O'Connor 97.22	2
8	Rob Cross 89.32	3
Q	Thibault Tricole 85.39	0
25	José de Sousa 93.82	1
Q	Jeffrey de Graaf 94.22	3
9	Jonny Clayton 88.45	3
Steve Lennon 86.67	1
24	Krzysztof Ratajski 89.82	3
Jamie Hughes 85.74	1

Third round (best of 7 sets); 27–29 December
1	Michael Smith 93.73	4
32	Madars Razma 87.78	1
16	Ross Smith 103.33	2
17	Chris Dobey 102.36	4
8	Rob Cross 101.32	4
Q	Jeffrey de Graaf 91.95	2
9	Jonny Clayton 91.55	4
24	Krzysztof Ratajski 92.94	2

Fourth round (best of 7 sets); 29–30 December
1	Michael Smith 102.47	0
17	Chris Dobey 102.43	4
8	Rob Cross 98.41	4
9	Jonny Clayton 90.89	0

Quarter-finals (best of 9 sets); 1 January
17	Chris Dobey 99.84	4
8	Rob Cross 100.70	5

==== Section 2 ====
First round (best of 5 sets); 15–21 December
Jim Williams 87.84	3
Q	Norman Madhoo 73.20	0
Radek Szagański 82.40	3
Q	Marko Kantele 78.47	2
Matt Campbell 93.14	3
Q	Lourence Ilagan 86.03	2
Christian Kist 90.55	0
Q	Luke Littler 106.12	3
Connor Scutt 95.97	3
Q	Krzysztof Kciuk 91.82	0
Mickey Mansell 89.94	3
Q	Xiaochen Zong 85.22	0
Keegan Brown 82.97	1
Q	Boris Krčmar 91.05	3
Simon Whitlock 90.13	3
Q	Paolo Nebrida 90.15	2

Second round (best of 5 sets); 15–23 December
4	Peter Wright 83.87	0
Jim Williams 90.45	3
29	Raymond van Barneveld 99.81	3
Radek Szagański 93.64	1
13	James Wade 92.30	2
Matt Campbell 96.28	3
20	Andrew Gilding 92.09	1
Q	Luke Littler 92.65	3
5	Gerwyn Price 98.01	3
Connor Scutt 88.83	0
28	Brendan Dolan 95.13	3
Mickey Mansell 95.36	2
12	Dirk van Duijvenbode 94.57	1
Q	Boris Krčmar 96.84	3
21	Gary Anderson 98.29	3
Simon Whitlock 88.38	0

Third round (best of 7 sets); 27–29 December
Jim Williams 91.71	1
29	Raymond van Barneveld 89.16	4
Matt Campbell 91.29	1
Q	Luke Littler 97.19	4
5	Gerwyn Price 95.76	2
28	Brendan Dolan 95.73	4
Q	Boris Krčmar 94.80	1
21	Gary Anderson 99.29	4

Fourth round (best of 7 sets); 29–30 December
29	Raymond van Barneveld 99.61	1
Q	Luke Littler 105.01	4
28	Brendan Dolan 94.01	4
21	Gary Anderson 93.38	3

Quarter-finals (best of 9 sets); 1 January
Q	Luke Littler 101.93	5
28	Brendan Dolan 86.45	1

=== Bottom half ===
==== Section 3 ====
First round (best of 5 sets); 15–21 December
Keane Barry 86.68	3
Q	Reynaldo Rivera 87.38	1
Richard Veenstra 85.29	3
Q	Ben Robb 89.51	0
Dylan Slevin 90.21	1
Q	Florian Hempel 91.06	3
Ryan Joyce 100.32	3
Q	Alex Spellman 95.46	1
Scott Williams 90.69	3
Q	Haruki Muramatsu 90.43	1
Jermaine Wattimena 90.99	3
Q	Fallon Sherrock 87.32	1
Martin Lukeman 92.03	3
Q	Haupai Puha 88.45	1
Luke Woodhouse 92.18	2
Q	Berry van Peer 93.87	3

Second round (best of 5 sets); 15–23 December
2	Michael van Gerwen 98.17	3
Keane Barry 95.81	0
31	Kim Huybrechts 84.77	0
Richard Veenstra 99.46	3
15	Dimitri Van den Bergh 90.77	2
Q	Florian Hempel 91.78	3
18	Stephen Bunting 107.28	3
Ryan Joyce 90.25	0
7	Danny Noppert 94.13	0
Scott Williams 94.01	3
26	Martin Schindler 96.93	3
Jermaine Wattimena 89.85	1
10	Damon Heta 89.69	3
Martin Lukeman 87.66	1
23	Josh Rock 91.87	1
Q	Berry van Peer 91.32	3

Third round (best of 7 sets); 27–29 December
2	Michael van Gerwen 101.39	4
Richard Veenstra 86.20	0
Q	Florian Hempel 93.79	0
18	Stephen Bunting 101.15	4
Scott Williams 94.36	4
26	Martin Schindler 95.15	3
10	Damon Heta 96.06	4
Q	Berry van Peer 88.29	3

Fourth round (best of 7 sets); 29–30 December
2	Michael van Gerwen 99.80	4
18	Stephen Bunting 94.84	0
Scott Williams 92.96	4
10	Damon Heta 92.50	1

Quarter-finals (best of 9 sets); 1 January
2	Michael van Gerwen 93.41	3
Scott Williams 96.32	5

==== Section 4 ====
First round (best of 5 sets); 15–21 December
Lee Evans 85.02	3
Q	Sandro Eric Sosing 75.59	0
Ricardo Pietreczko 92.37	3
Q	Mikuru Suzuki 78.27	0
Jules van Dongen 90.72	1
Q	Darren Penhall 91.29	3
Ian White 93.39	1
Q	Tomoya Goto 90.71	3
Ricky Evans 92.34	3
Q	Simon Adams 75.89	0
Steve Beaton 92.01	3
Q	Wessel Nijman 92.82	1
Cameron Menzies 88.49	3
Q	Rusty-Jake Rodriguez 81.83	0
Gian van Veen 87.53	2
Q	Man Lok Leung 96.26	3

Second round (best of 5 sets); 15–23 December
3	Luke Humphries 93.58	3
Lee Evans 92.33	0
30	Callan Rydz 96.65	2
Ricardo Pietreczko 99.27	3
14	Joe Cullen 93.41	3
Q	Darren Penhall 81.24	0
19	Ryan Searle 91.11	3
Q	Tomoya Goto 85.62	1
6	Nathan Aspinall 90.54	0
Ricky Evans 99.38	3
27	Daryl Gurney 100.79	3
Steve Beaton 91.16	1
11	Dave Chisnall 90.94	3
Cameron Menzies 87.32	1
22	Gabriel Clemens 90.66	3
Q	Man Lok Leung 92.56	1

Third round (best of 7 sets); 27–29 December
3	Luke Humphries 91.38	4
Ricardo Pietreczko 91.02	3
14	Joe Cullen 96.51	4
19	Ryan Searle 93.94	2
Ricky Evans 93.23	2
27	Daryl Gurney 93.53	4
11	Dave Chisnall 95.49	4
22	Gabriel Clemens 96.16	1

Fourth round (best of 7 sets); 29–30 December
3	Luke Humphries 99.23	4
14	Joe Cullen 98.66	3
27	Daryl Gurney 91.03	2
11	Dave Chisnall 98.98	4

Quarter-finals (best of 9 sets); 1 January
3	Luke Humphries 103.65	5
11	Dave Chisnall 97.51	1

== Final ==
Best of 13 sets Referee: Russ Bray; Alexandra Palace, London, England, 3 January 2024
Luke Littler	4–7	Luke Humphries
1–3, 3–2, 2–3, 3–1, 3–1, 3–0, 2–3, 1–3, 2–3, 1–3, 2–3
101.13	Average (3 darts)	103.67
58	100+ scores	53
34	140+ scores	37
13	180 scores	23
170	Highest checkout	170
4	100+ Checkouts	5
23/63 (36%)	Checkout summary	25/58 (41%)

== Statistics ==
=== Highest averages ===
This table shows all averages over 100 achieved by players throughout the tournament. For players with multiple high averages, this is indicated by the number in brackets.

The three-dart average is the most cited statistic in darts matches as it gives a rough estimate of a player's form. For comparison with previous years, see the highest ever recorded averages in the World Darts Championship.

Player	Round	Average	Opponent	Result
Luke Humphries	SF	108.74	Scott Williams	Won
Stephen Bunting	2	107.28	Ryan Joyce	Won
Luke Littler	1	106.12	Christian Kist	Won
Luke Littler (2)	SF	106.05	Rob Cross	Won
Luke Littler (3)	4	105.01	Raymond van Barneveld	Won
Luke Humphries (2)	F	103.67	Luke Littler	Won
Luke Humphries (3)	QF	103.50	Dave Chisnall	Won
Ross Smith	3	103.33	Chris Dobey	Lost
Chris Dobey	2	103.09	William O'Connor	Won
Rob Cross	SF	102.77	Luke Littler	Lost
Michael Smith	4	102.47	Chris Dobey	Lost
Chris Dobey (2)	4	102.43	Michael Smith	Won
Chris Dobey (3)	3	102.36	Ross Smith	Won
Luke Littler (4)	QF	101.93	Brendan Dolan	Won
Michael van Gerwen	3	101.39	Richard Veenstra	Won
Rob Cross (2)	3	101.32	Jeffrey de Graaf	Won
Stephen Bunting (2)	3	101.15	Florian Hempel	Won
Luke Littler (5)	F	101.13	Luke Humphries	Lost
Daryl Gurney	2	100.79	Steve Beaton	Won
Rob Cross (3)	QF	100.70	Chris Dobey	Won
Ryan Joyce	1	100.32	Alex Spellman	Won
Michael Smith (2)	2	100.09	Kevin Doets	Won

=== Ballon d'Art ===
Tournament sponsors Paddy Power pledged to donate £1,000 to Prostate Cancer UK for each maximum 180 scored during the tournament. As part of this, they additionally announced a new trophy, dubbed the Ballon d'Art in reference to association football's Ballon d'Or, for the player who hit the most 180s. World Champion Luke Humphries achieved the most 180s with 73 to additionally win the inaugural Ballon d'Art trophy. The tournament finished with a total of 914 180s scored.

=== Representation ===
In total, 27 nations were represented, compared to the record of 29 in 2021 and 2022.

== Media coverage ==
=== Television audience ===
Buoyed by media attention to Littler, the event's final set records for television viewership. In the United Kingdom, the final drew an average audience of 3.1 million viewers on subscription channel Sky Sports, peaking at 3.7 million near the end of the contest. This was the broadcaster's highest ever audience for a non-football event.

In Germany, Sport1 broadcasting the event, held the overall primetime lead for four different nights for men aged between 14 and 49. The semifinals also led primetime among adults 14–49, while the final won the entire day in the age group, surpassing even the main evening news broadcasts. The final's average audience of 1.91 million was second only to Phil Taylor's retirement match in the 2018 final, while the peak audience of 2.86 million was a new tournament record.

=== Documentary ===
Following the conclusion of the tournament, Sky announced a three-part series following a selection of players in the run-up to and during the 2024 World Championship, to be shown as part of their Sky Documentaries lineup. Produced in collaboration with longform documentary veterans Dorothy Street Pictures, it was simply known under the working title Darts, before being unveiled under the name Game of Throws upon the conclusion of the 2024 Grand Slam of Darts.
