= Russ Bray =

English darts referee (born 1957)

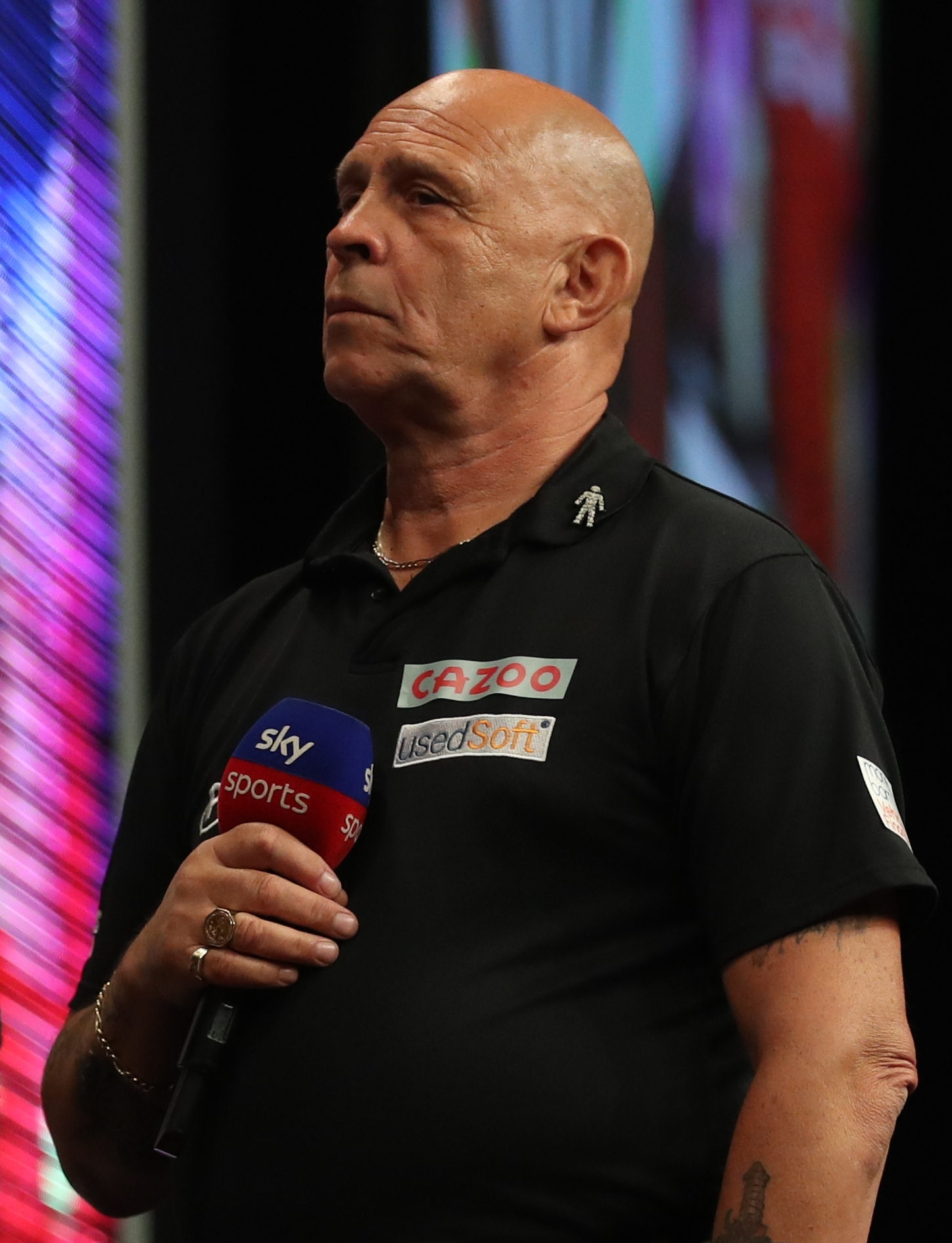
- Bray in 2022
- Born: 22 June 1957 (age 69); South Ockendon, Essex, England
- Other name: "The Voice"
- Occupation: Retired darts referee
- Years active: 1996–present (became semi-retired in 2024)
- Known for: Refereeing Professional Darts Corporation events

Russ Bray (born 22 June 1957) is an English darts referee who works for the Professional Darts Corporation (PDC) as an ambassador. Known as "The Voice", from his unique style of calling and raspy voice, he was inducted into the PDC Hall of Fame in 2024. Bray previously worked as a police traffic officer. Bray stepped down from being a full-time referee following the 2023–24 PDC World Darts Championship final following a 28 year career.

== Darts career (1996–2024) ==
According to Bray himself, his calling career began one night when the regular caller failed to show for a county match. Bray was then contracted to call for the PDC in 1996 and was given his debut at the World Matchplay in Blackpool. He was the caller when Phil Taylor hit the PDC's first-ever televised nine-darter and the world's second ever live televised nine-darter in 2002 at the same event. He has called eight more nine-darters live on TV since then including the first televised nine-darter outside of Europe by Mervyn King in Johannesburg, South Africa.

Bray was a county player for Hertfordshire and subsequently played on the pro circuit. He teamed up with Eric Bristow to win the Norway and Finland pairs.

Bray also hit the bullseye on a standard dartboard from 10 feet, outdoors, on Blackpool's North Pier, thus achieving a Guinness World Record in the process. Bray beat the day's previous best of 9' 6" which was achieved by fellow PDC official Scott Gibling.

In November 2023, Bray announced that he would retire from full-time refereeing at the end of the 2024 PDC World Darts Championship, but would continue to work with the PDC as an ambassador. His last televised ranking match was the 2024 world final, in which Luke Humphries defeated Luke Littler to win his first world title. On the occasion of his retirement, Bray was inducted into the PDC Hall of Fame by PDC chief executive Matt Porter.

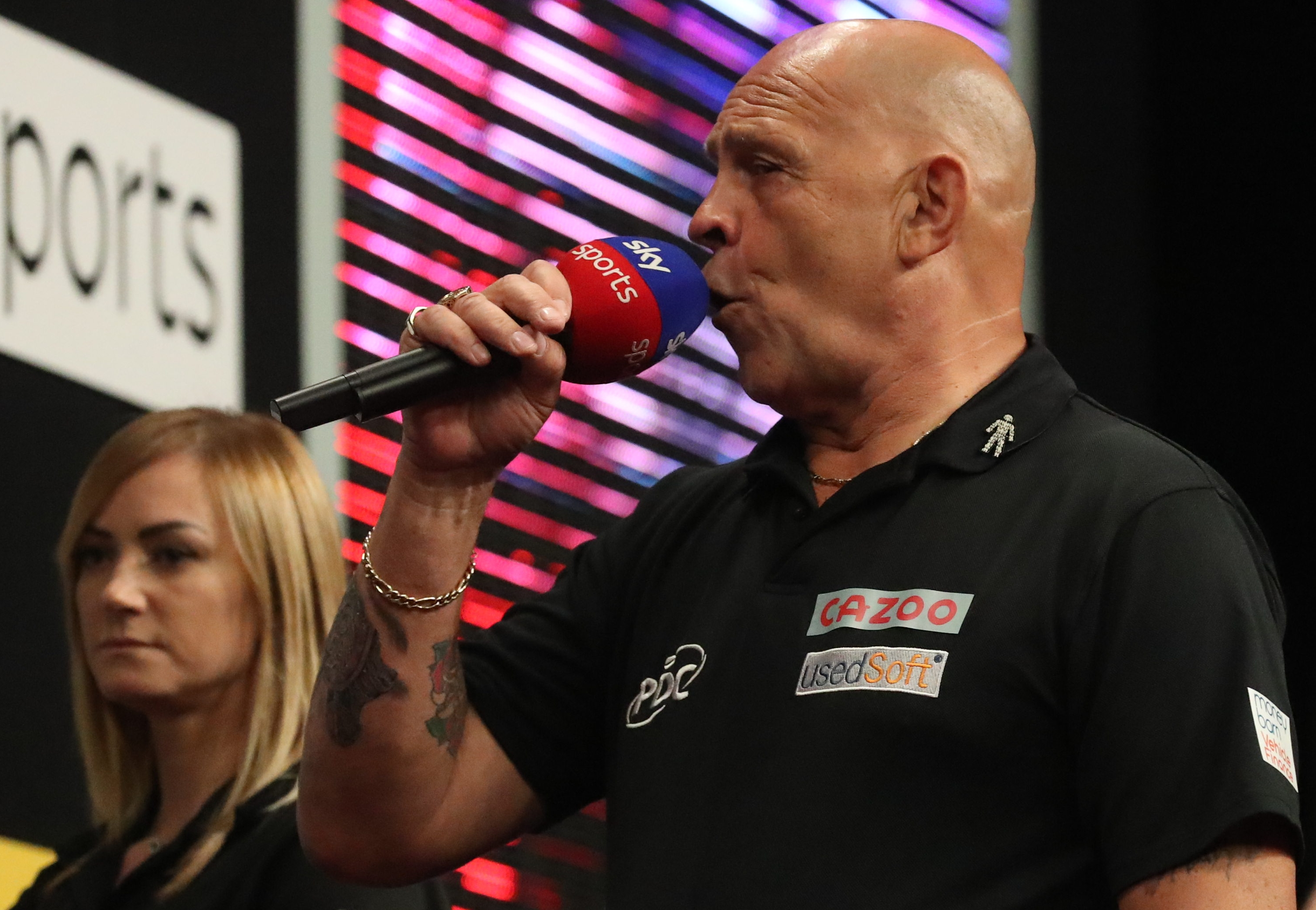
Bray calling a 2022 Premier League match

== Other work ==
Bray has made use of his raspy voice in various other forms of media. He was the referee in the PDC's first ever video game, PDC World Championship Darts and also became the voice of Feasters, a microwave food chain. He has also provided voiceover work for advertising from Coral, Ladbrokes, Cash Converters & McCoy's Crisps. Additionally, he has also provided his voice and his name to Russ Bray Darts, a mobile app. Bray has since made an appearance in boxing as the voice on Sky Sports Fight Night in October. Bray has also featured on numerous television shows, such as Eastenders, Family Affairs, and Not Going Out.

== Personal life ==
Bray currently resides in Soham, Cambridgeshire with his wife, Sue.

He is a lifelong supporter of football club West Ham United.
