= 2015 European Darts Grand Prix =

Tournament information
- Dates: 16–18 October 2015
- Venue: Glaspalast
- Location: Sindelfingen, Germany
- Organisation(s): Professional Darts Corporation (PDC)
- Format: Legs
- Prize fund: £115,000
- Winner's share: £25,000
- High checkout: 161; Alan Norris; Peter Wright

Champion(s)
- Kim Huybrechts (BEL)

The 2015 European Darts Grand Prix was the ninth of nine PDC European Tour events on the 2015 PDC Pro Tour. The tournament took place in Glaspalast in Sindelfingen, Germany from 16 to 18 October 2015. It featured a field of 48 players and £115,000 in prize money, with £25,000 going to the winner.

Mervyn King was the defending champion, but he lost in the third round to Mensur Suljović. Kim Huybrechts defeated Peter Wright 6–5 in the final, coming back from 5–2 down in the process to win his second European title.

== Prize money ==
The prize fund was increased to £115,000 after being £100,000 for the previous two years.

Stage (num. of players)		Prize money
Winner	(1)	£25,000
Runner-up	(1)	£10,000
Semi-finalists	(2)	£5,000
Quarter-finalists	(4)	£3,500
Third round losers	(8)	£2,000
Second round losers	(16)	£1,500
First round losers	(16)	£1,000
Total	£115,000	

== Qualification and format ==
The top 16 players from the PDC ProTour Order of Merit on 17 September automatically qualified for the event and were seeded in the second round. The remaining 32 places went to players from three qualifying events - 20 from the UK Qualifier (held in Barnsley on 25 September), eight from the European Qualifier and four from the Host Nation Qualifier (both held at the venue the day before the event started). The following players are taking part in the tournament:

Top 16
1. (Netherlands) Michael van Gerwen (second round)
2. (England) Michael Smith (quarter-finals)
3. (England) James Wade (semi-finals)
4. (Scotland) Peter Wright (runner-up)
5. (England) Ian White (quarter-finals)
6. (Scotland) Robert Thornton (third round)
7. (Belgium) Kim Huybrechts (winner)
8. (Northern Ireland) Brendan Dolan (second round)
9. (England) Dave Chisnall (second round)
10. (England) Justin Pipe (second round)
11. (Netherlands) Jelle Klaasen (quarter-finals)
12. (England) Terry Jenkins (second round)
13. (Netherlands) Vincent van der Voort (second round)
14. (Australia) Simon Whitlock (third round)
15. (Netherlands) Benito van de Pas (second round)
16. (England) Mervyn King (third round)

UK Qualifier
- (Wales) Gerwyn Price (third round)
- (England) Stephen Bunting (third round)
- (England) Steve Beaton (third round)
- (Scotland) Mark Barilli (first round)
- (England) Robbie Green (first round)
- (England) Johnny Haines (first round)
- (Wales) Johnny Clayton (second round)
- (Wales) Mark Webster (second round)
- (England) Jamie Caven (second round)
- (Northern Ireland) Mickey Mansell (second round)
- (England) Dave Ladley (second round)
- (England) Mark Walsh (first round)
- (England) Alan Norris (first round)
- (England) Stephen Willard (first round)
- (England) Dean Winstanley (second round)
- (South Africa) Devon Petersen (first round)
- (England) Joe Cullen (quarter-finals)
- (England) David Pallett (second round)
- (England) Ricky Evans (first round)
- (England) Lee Evans (third round)

European Qualifier
- (Netherlands) Jermaine Wattimena (second round)
- (Spain) Antonio Alcinas (first round)
- (Netherlands) Raymond van Barneveld (third round)
- (Austria) Mensur Suljović (semi-finals)
- (Netherlands) Jeffrey de Zwaan (second round)
- (Croatia) Robert Marijanović (first round)
- (Austria) Rowby-John Rodriguez (first round)
- (Sweden) Magnus Caris (first round)

Host Nation Qualifier
- (Germany) Kevin Münch (first round)
- (Germany) Jyhan Artut (first round)
- (Germany) Stefan Stoyke (first round)
- (Germany) Max Hopp (first round)

== Draw ==
First round (best of 11 legs); 16 October
(Austria) Mensur Suljović 88.63	6
(Scotland) Mark Barilli 86.08	4
(Austria) Rowby-John Rodriguez 85.83	3
(Netherlands) Jeffrey de Zwaan 93.19	6
(Netherlands) Raymond van Barneveld 100.76	6
(England) Johnny Haines 91.95	3
(England) Joe Cullen 95.12	6
(Spain) Antonio Alcinas 83.77	3
(Northern Ireland) Mickey Mansell 92.58	6
(England) Robbie Green 82.59	1
(Germany) Jyhan Artut 91.66	3
(England) Lee Evans 92.94	6
(Netherlands) Jermaine Wattimena 84.86	6
(Croatia) Robert Marijanović 85.30	5
(England) Stephen Bunting 94.22	6
(England) Alan Norris 95.13	4
(England) Dean Winstanley 83.58	6
(South Africa) Devon Petersen 82.52	5
(Wales) Gerwyn Price 87.13	6
(Germany) Max Hopp 88.31	5
(England) Dave Ladley 87.10	6
(Sweden) Magnus Caris 84.70	5
(England) Steve Beaton 86.08	6
(England) Mark Walsh 88.22	3
(Wales) Johnny Clayton 78.42	6
(Germany) Kevin Münch 74.95	0
(England) David Pallett 90.63	6
(England) Ricky Evans 85.45	4
(Wales) Mark Webster 89.71	6
(England) Stephen Willard 86.34	3
(England) Jamie Caven 91.64	6
(Germany) Stefan Stoyke 85.31	4

Second round (best of 11 legs); 17 October
1	(Netherlands) Michael van Gerwen 111.37	4
(Austria) Mensur Suljović 109.70	6
16	(England) Mervyn King 94.74	6
(Netherlands) Jeffrey de Zwaan 92.61	2
8	(Northern Ireland) Brendan Dolan 90.59	1
(Netherlands) Raymond van Barneveld 95.97	6
9	(England) Dave Chisnall 90.14	2
(England) Joe Cullen 103.58	6
5	(England) Ian White 97.10	6
(Northern Ireland) Mickey Mansell 94.02	3
12	(England) Terry Jenkins 95.49	4
(England) Lee Evans 95.92	6
4	(Scotland) Peter Wright 90.43	6
(Netherlands) Jermaine Wattimena 88.59	3
13	(Netherlands) Vincent van der Voort 95.01	4
(England) Stephen Bunting 100.72	6
2	(England) Michael Smith 96.32	6
(England) Dean Winstanley 87.50	3
15	(Netherlands) Benito van de Pas 92.08	3
(Wales) Gerwyn Price 88.44	6
7	(Belgium) Kim Huybrechts 105.71	6
(England) Dave Ladley 89.23	4
10	(England) Justin Pipe 91.84	5
(England) Steve Beaton 95.54	6
6	(Scotland) Robert Thornton 92.04	6
(Wales) Johnny Clayton 90.42	5
11	(Netherlands) Jelle Klaasen 104.78	6
(England) David Pallett 94.07	4
3	(England) James Wade 95.32	6
(Wales) Mark Webster 90.09	3
14	(Australia) Simon Whitlock 100.72	6
(England) Jamie Caven 95.57	4

Third round (best of 11 legs); 18 October
(Austria) Suljović 97.24	6
16	(England) King 98.92	5
(Netherlands) van Barneveld 111.06	2
(England) Cullen 110.16	6
5	(England) White 102.69	6
(England) L. Evans 96.90	3
4	(Scotland) Wright 99.21	6
(England) Bunting 103.30	2
2	(England) Smith 93.10	6
(Wales) Price 87.36	3
7	(Belgium) Huybrechts 104.70	6
(England) Beaton 100.25	5
6	(Scotland) Thornton 93.45	4
11	(Netherlands) Klaasen 91.05	6
3	(England) Wade 96.83	6
14	(Australia) Whitlock 93.94	5

Quarter-finals (best of 11 legs); 18 October
(Austria) Suljović 91.66	6
(England) Cullen 89.88	4
5	(England) White 98.10	5
4	(Scotland) Wright 99.12	6
2	(England) Smith 92.08	5
7	(Belgium) Huybrechts 97.51	6
11	(Netherlands) Klaasen 94.90	4
3	(England) Wade 103.52	6

Semi-finals (best of 11 legs); 18 October
(Austria) Suljović 96.44	5
4	(Scotland) Wright 94.58	6
7	(Belgium) Huybrechts 96.59	6
3	(England) Wade 89.08	4

Final (best of 11 legs); 18 October
4	(Scotland) Wright 99.95	5
7	(Belgium) Huybrechts 99.30	6
