= 2023 International Darts Open =

2023 edition of International Darts Open

2023 Interwetten International Darts Open

Tournament information
- Dates: 31 March–2 April 2023
- Venue: SACHSENarena
- Location: Riesa, Germany
- Organisation(s): Professional Darts Corporation (PDC)
- Format: Legs
- Prize fund: £175,000
- Winner's share: £30,000
- High checkout: 161 Jonny Clayton

Champion(s)
- Gerwyn Price

The 2023 Interwetten International Darts Open was the third of thirteen PDC European Tour events on the 2023 PDC Pro Tour. The tournament took place at the SACHSENarena, Riesa, Germany from 31 March–2 April 2023. It featured a field of 48 players and £175,000 in prize money, with £30,000 going to the winner.

The defending champion was Gerwyn Price, who defeated Peter Wright 8–4 in the 2022 final.

Price successfully defended his title, winning his second consecutive and eighth overall European title, after defeating Michael van Gerwen 8–4 in the final. He won the International Darts Open for the fourth time.

The event was the 100th PDC European Tour event.

== Prize money ==
The prize money was increased for the first time in 4 years for all European Tours:

Stage (num. of players)		Prize money
Winner	(1)	£30,000
Runner-up	(1)	£12,000
Semi-finalists	(2)	£8,500
Quarter-finalists	(4)	£6,000
Third round losers	(8)	£4,000
Second round losers	(16)	£2,500*
First round losers	(16)	£1,250
Total	£175,000	

- Seeded players who lost in the second round of the event were not credited with prize money on any Order of Merit. A player who qualified as a qualifier, but later became a seed due to the withdrawal of one or more other players was credited with their prize money on all Orders of Merit regardless of how far they progressed in the event.

== Qualification and format ==
The top 16 entrants from the PDC Pro Tour Order of Merit on 15 February 2023 automatically qualified for the event and were seeded in the second round.

The remaining 32 places went to players from six qualifying events – 24 from the Tour Card Holder Qualifier (held on 20 February), two from the Associate Member Qualifier (held on 11 February), the two highest ranked Germans automatically qualified, alongside two from the Host Nation Qualifier (held on 11 February), one from the Nordic & Baltic Associate Member Qualifier (held on 19 February), and one from the East European Associate Member Qualifier (held on 12 February).

On 30 March, it was announced that top seed Luke Humphries had withdrawn, owing to the illness that forced him to withdraw from the 2023 European Darts Open the week before, moving José de Sousa into a seeded position. Adrian Lewis and Sebastian Białecki also withdrew from the tournament.

The three were replaced via the Reserve List by Scott Williams, Raymond van Barneveld and Mike De Decker. Jim Williams, top of the Reserve List, declined his invitation.

The following players took part in the tournament:

Top 16

1. Michael van Gerwen (runner-up)
2. Damon Heta (quarter-finals)
3. Rob Cross (quarter-finals)
4. Dave Chisnall (third round)
5. Nathan Aspinall (third round)
6. Michael Smith (second round)
7. Dirk van Duijvenbode (semi-finals)
8. Peter Wright (quarter-finals)
9. Joe Cullen (second round)
10. Danny Noppert (third round)
11. Gerwyn Price (champion)
12. Martin Schindler (semi-finals)
13. Jonny Clayton (quarter-finals)
14. Josh Rock (third round)
15. Dimitri Van den Bergh (second round)
16. José de Sousa (third round)

Tour Card Qualifier
- Andrew Gilding (second round)
- Brendan Dolan (second round)
- Daryl Gurney (first round)
- Richie Burnett (first round)
- Simon Whitlock (first round)
- Kim Huybrechts (first round)
- Brian Raman (second round)
- Lee Evans (second round)
- José Justicia (second round)
- Madars Razma (first round)
- Ross Smith (second round)
- Mario Vandenbogaerde (second round)
- Stephen Burton (first round)
- James Wilson (first round)
- Ryan Meikle (first round)
- Ian White (first round)
- Alan Soutar (third round)
- Matt Campbell (second round)
- Callan Rydz (first round)
- Pascal Rupprecht (first round)
- Steve Lennon (second round)
- Keegan Brown (first round)

Associate Member Qualifier
- Jeroen Mioch (first round)
- Andy Boulton (first round)

Highest Ranking Germans
- Gabriel Clemens (second round)
- Florian Hempel (second round)

Host Nation Qualifier
- Niko Springer (third round)
- (Germany) Liam Maendl-Lawrance (second round)

Nordic & Baltic Qualifier
- Paavo Myller (first round)

Reserve List Qualifiers
- Scott Williams (first round)
- Raymond van Barneveld (second round)
- Mike De Decker (third round)

== Draw ==
The draw was confirmed on 30 March. Numbers to the left of players' names show the seedings for the top 16 in the tournament. The figures to the right of a player's name state their three-dart average in a match. Players in bold denote match winners.

**First round** (best of 11 legs); 31 March
Keegan Brown 85.78	4
**Matt Campbell 90.64**	**6**
Kim Huybrechts 94.71	5
Lee Evans 99.90
Ian White 84.96	4
**José Justicia 85.84**	**6**
Jeroen Mioch 82.82	4
**Alan Soutar 86.12**	**6**
**Andrew Gilding 100.59**	**6**
Daryl Gurney 94.33	4
**Brian Raman 91.88**	**6**
Ryan Meikle 86.57	2
**Mario Vandenbogaerde 87.48**	**6**
Madars Razma 86.43	4
**Alt**	**Raymond van Barneveld 94.39**	**6**
Stephen Burton 91.42	3
**Brendan Dolan 97.21**	**6**
Pascal Rupprecht 92.74	3
**Niko Springer 99.65**	**6**
Alt	Scott Williams 97.81	4
**Gabriel Clemens 96.19**	**6**
Simon Whitlock 90.47	5
Richie Burnett 85.10	4
**Liam Maendl-Lawrance 81.43**	**6**
**Steve Lennon 88.86**	**6**
Andy Boulton 88.55	4
**Florian Hempel 84.92**	**6**
James Wilson 82.75	4
Callan Rydz 89.14	3
**Alt**	**Mike De Decker 90.95**	**6**
**Ross Smith 90.58**	**6**
Paavo Myller 78.13	3

**Second round** (best of 11 legs); 1 April
**1**	**Michael van Gerwen 102.33**	**6**
Matt Campbell 97.17	5
**16**	**José de Sousa 92.97**	**6**
Lee Evans 78.03	0
**8**	**Peter Wright 97.34**	**6**
José Justicia 90.77	3
9	Joe Cullen 87.55	2
**Alan Soutar 86.53**	**6**
**4**	**Dave Chisnall 100.46**	**6**
Andrew Gilding 94.73	2
**13**	**Jonny Clayton 94.18**	**6**
Brian Raman 85.98	4
**5**	**Nathan Aspinall 96.50**	**6**
Mario Vandenbogaerde 89.47	2
**12**	**Martin Schindler 92.06**	**6**
Alt	Raymond van Barneveld 89.77	4
**2**	**Damon Heta 97.81**	**6**
Brendan Dolan 91.43	3
15	Dimitri Van den Bergh 82.59	1
**Niko Springer 91.24**	**6**
**7**	**Dirk van Duijvenbode 97.01**	**6**
Gabriel Clemens 96.92	3
**10**	**Danny Noppert 90.79**	**6**
Liam Maendl-Lawrance 91.88	5
**3**	**Rob Cross 90.47**	**6**
Steve Lennon 90.06	3
**14**	**Josh Rock 93.69**	**6**
Florian Hempel 79.80	4
6	Michael Smith 92.64	1
**Alt**	**Mike De Decker 91.42**	**6**
**11**	**Gerwyn Price 104.24**	**6**
Ross Smith 97.33	3

**Third round** (best of 11 legs); 2 April
**1**	**van Gerwen 95.97**	**6**
16	Sousa 84.75	1
**8**	**Wright 84.42**	**6**
Soutar 81.35	4
4	Chisnall 91.39	2
**13**	**Clayton 104.28**	**6**
5	Aspinall 94.16	3
**12**	**Schindler 91.77**	**6**
**2**	**Heta 94.22**	**6**
Springer 90.68	3
**7**	**van Duijvenbode 99.21**	**6**
10	Noppert 88.73	5
**3**	**Cross 100.14**	**6**
14	Rock 93.09	3
Alt	De Decker 98.55	5
**11**	**Price 106.69**	**6**

**Quarter-finals** (best of 11 legs); 2 April
**1**	**van Gerwen 98.02**	**6**
8	Wright 85.10	0
13	Clayton 93.87	3
**12**	**Schindler 102.07**	**6**
2	Heta 89.70	4
**7**	**van Duijvenbode 96.30**	**6**
3	Cross 89.82	4
**11**	**Price 96.68**	**6**

**Semi-finals** (best of 13 legs); 2 April
**1**	**van Gerwen 99.94**	**7**
12	Schindler 93.28	4
7	van Duijvenbode 90.79	2
**11**	**Price 106.66**	**7**

**Final** (best of 15 legs); 2 April
1	van Gerwen 100.46	4
**11**	**Price 105.64**	**8**
