= Sachsen Arena =

Architectural structure

Coordinates: 51.29739°N 13.295002°E

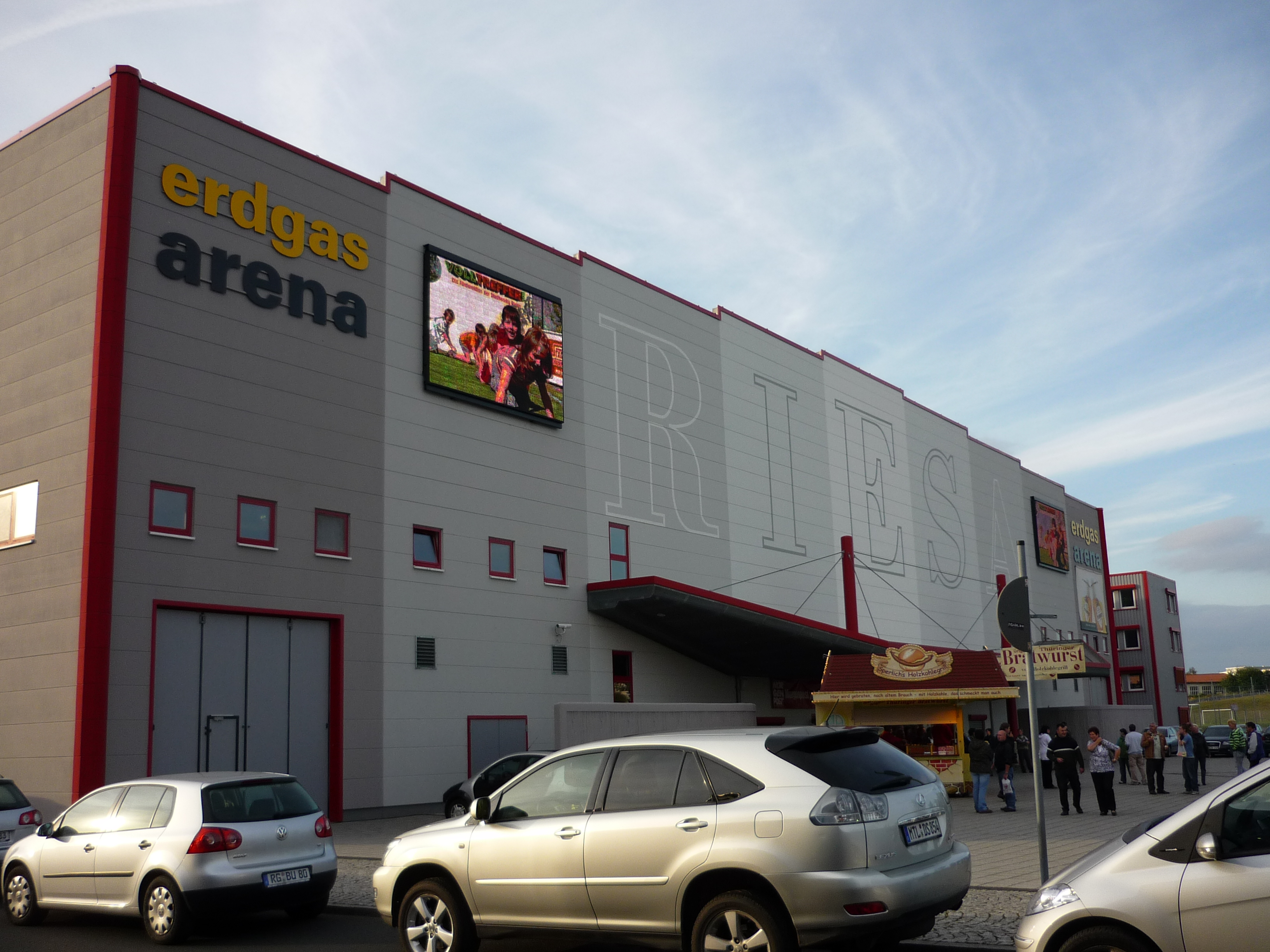
Erdgasarena

The Sachsen Arena (often styled SACHSENarena) is a sports arena in Riesa, Germany.

It opened in 2004. Under a sponsorship deal in effect until 2012, it was originally named Erdgas Arena. It holds 5,500 people. It is primarily used for ice hockey. It is used for many world level dance competitions called the World Dance Championships run by the International Dance Organization, including a showdance and tap dance competition in which representatives of as many as 50 countries vie to become "World Champion". This is the only official world championships and is recognized as being "the Olympics of dance".

Since 2015, it has also been the home of the International Darts Open, one of the many events of the PDC European Tour.
