= Auckland Open (darts) =

Tournament information
- Location: Auckland
- Country: New Zealand
- Established: 2006
- Organisation(s): NZDC / BDO, category D / WDF category 3
- Format: Legs
- Prize fund: Unknown
- Month(s) Played: September

Current champion(s)
- (New Zealand) Craig Caldwell

The Auckland Open is an annual darts tournament on the WDF circuit that began in 2006.

== List of tournaments ==
Year	Champion	Score	Runner-up	Total Prize Money	Champion	Runner-up
2006	(New Zealand) Herbie Nathan	4–3	(New Zealand) John Sinclair			
2006	(New Zealand) Peggy Speir	4–2	(New Zealand) Valona Hereora			
2007	(New Zealand) Graeme McElroy (88.41)	4–0	(New Zealand) Paul Visschers (60.15)			
2007	(New Zealand) Mata Tetauru (62.85)	4–1	(New Zealand) Megan Smith (57.21)			
2008	(New Zealand) Craig Caldwell (75.90)	4–3	(New Zealand) Lou Tai (71.10)			
2008	(New Zealand) Lorene Earnshaw (57.39)	4–3	(New Zealand) Rogere Te Whero (58.17)			
2009	(New Zealand) Richard Te Whero	4–3	(New Zealand) Mike Day			
2009	(New Zealand) Denisa Walker	4–2	(New Zealand) Gail Taylor			
2010	(New Zealand) Cyndric Joyce	4–2	(New Zealand) Richard Te Whero			
2010	(New Zealand) Jannette Jonathan	4–0	(New Zealand) Malia Ioane			
2011	(New Zealand) Jonathan Silcock	4–3	(New Zealand) Monty Tuhua			
2011	(New Zealand) Jannette Jonathan	4–3	(New Zealand) Selina Baker-Clemas			
2012	(New Zealand) Cody Harris	6–1	(New Zealand) Sam Bryant			
2012	(New Zealand) Polly Luke	5–4	(New Zealand) Jannette Jonathan			
2013	(New Zealand) Cody Harris	5–0	(New Zealand) Rodney Moreland			
2013	(New Zealand) Kit Bennett	5–0	(New Zealand) Lorraine Pike			
2014	(New Zealand) Cody Harris	4–3	(New Zealand) Mike Day			
2014	(New Zealand) Tina Osborne	5–3	(New Zealand) Sha Hohipa			
2015	(New Zealand) Craig Caldwell	5–3	(New Zealand) Mark Cleaver			
2015	(New Zealand) Jo Steed	5–4	(New Zealand) Sha Hohipa			
2016	(New Zealand) Mark Cleaver	6–1	(New Zealand) Greg Moss			
2016	(New Zealand) Jo Steed	–	(New Zealand) Tina Osborne			
2017	(New Zealand) Craig Caldwell	6–5	(New Zealand) Mark McGrath			
2017	(New Zealand) Tina Osborne	–	(New Zealand) Sha Hohipa			
2018	(New Zealand) Mark McGrath	6–4	(New Zealand) Haupai Puha			
2018	(New Zealand) Jannette Jonathan	5–4	(New Zealand) Taylor Marsh Kahaki			

== 2016 tournament ==
Auckland Open

Tournament information
- Dates: 17 September 2016
- Location: Auckland
- Country: New Zealand
- Organisation(s): BDO, WDF, NZDC

Champion(s)
- (New Zealand) Mark Cleaver

The 2016 Auckland Open took place in Auckland on 17 September 2016.

=== Results ===
Here are the results:

Final 16
(New Zealand)	Mark Cleaver
(New Zealand)	Tukina Weko
(New Zealand)	John Kelly
(New Zealand)	Mike Buttar
(New Zealand)	Steve Doak
(New Zealand)	Peter Herewini
(New Zealand)	Peter Hunt
(New Zealand)	Carlos McKinley
(New Zealand)	Greg Moss
(New Zealand)	Mike Day
(New Zealand)	Jason Ladbrook
(New Zealand)	Sonny Harris
(New Zealand)	Cody Harris
(New Zealand)	Charlie Maru
(New Zealand)	Rob Szabo
(New Zealand)	Joshua Roberts

Quarter-finals
(New Zealand)	Mark Cleaver	5
(New Zealand)	John Kelly	4
(New Zealand)	Steve Doak	5
(New Zealand)	Peter Hunt	4
(New Zealand)	Greg Moss	5
(New Zealand)	Jason Ladbrook	4
(New Zealand)	Cody Harris	5
(New Zealand)	Rob Szabo	3

Semi-finals
(New Zealand)	Mark Cleaver	5
(New Zealand)	Steve Doak	1
(New Zealand)	Greg Moss	5
(New Zealand)	Cody Harris	3

Final
(New Zealand)	Mark Cleaver	6
(New Zealand)	Greg Moss	1

== Tournament records men ==
- Most wins 3: (New Zealand) Cody Harris.
- Most Finals 3: (New Zealand) Cody Harris.
- Most Semi-finals 4: (New Zealand) Cody Harris, (New Zealand) Craig Caldwell.
- Most Quarter-finals 4: (New Zealand) Cody Harris, (New Zealand) Craig Caldwell.
- Most Appearances 5: (New Zealand) Cody Harris.
- Most Prize Money won NZS$ ,:
- Best winning average (.) : .
- Youngest Winner age 32: (New Zealand) Craig Caldwell.
- Oldest Winner age 32: (New Zealand) Craig Caldwell.

== See also ==
- List of BDO ranked tournaments
- List of WDF tournaments
