= List of WDF tournaments =

The World Darts Federation recognise many darts tournaments each year including major titles such as the Lakeside World Professional Championship and the Winmau World Masters. Through 2007, the WDF had held four majors which constituted the Grand Slam, until the Topic International Darts League and Bavaria World Darts Trophy were cancelled in 2008 following the withdrawal of the Dutch broadcasters SBS6, when it was announced that PDC players, including Raymond van Barneveld, Jelle Klaasen, and Michael van Gerwen would not be competing.

In 2020, the WDF took over the running of the World Championship and World Masters from the BDO. To coincide with this, they updated their ranking criteria and the WDF World Rankings.

== Tournaments ==
Tournaments listed below are recognised by the WDF and ranked accordingly to their point allocation system but are not organised or run by them they are staged by WDF member associations, councils federations and organisations.

The tournaments organised and operated by the WDF are:

- The World Championship (annual)
- The World Masters (annual)
- The WDF World Cup (every two years)
- The WDF Europe Cup (every two years)
- The WDF Asia-Pacific Cup (every two years)
- The WDF Americas Cup (every two years)

== Tournament levels and points allocation ==
Prior to 2020, a player's WDF Ranking is based on the total points they have accrued over the previous 12-month period that run from December to December according to the tournament schedule from the following 85 tournaments:

- The five World Darts Federation Major tournaments.
- The thirteen World Darts Federation Category One tournaments.
- The twenty six World Darts Federation Category Two tournaments.
- The thirty seven World Darts Federation Category Three tournaments.
- The four Major international events WDF World Cup (singles, pairs, team), WDF Americas Cup (singles, pairs, team), WDF Europe Cup(singles, pairs, team) and WDF Asia-Pacific Cup(singles, pairs, team).

Since 2020, the criteria has been modified and adapted. Now, the Men's and Women's WDF Main Ranking Tables are 104 week rolling tables and are used for seeding WDF ranked tournaments. Each player's best 15 points totals count towards their overall ranking. The Boys and Girls WDF Main Ranking tables are 52 week rolling tables and are used for seeding WDF ranked tournaments. Each player's best 10 points totals count towards their overall ranking.

== Ranking method ==
Since the formation of the WDF rankings in 1974, the method used to calculate a player's ranking points has changed several times.

=== Current points distribution ===
Points are currently awarded as follows:

| Tournament category | W | F | SF | QF | R16 | R32 | R64 |
| WDF Platinum tournaments | 270 | 167 | 103 | 64 | 39 | 26 | 13 |
| WDF Gold tournaments | 180 | 111 | 68 | 43 | 26 | 17 | 9 |
| WDF Silver tournaments | 90 | 56 | 34 | 21 | 13 | 9 | N/A |
| WDF Bronze tournaments | 45 | 28 | 17 | 11 | 6 | N/A | N/A |

== Platinum-ranked tournaments ==
| Tournament | Country | Current or last location | Current or last venue | Founded | Defending Men's Champion | Defending Women's Champion | Total Prize Money |
|---|---|---|---|---|---|---|---|
| WDF World Darts Championship | England | Surrey | Lakeside Country Club | 2022 | (Netherlands) Jimmy van Schie | (England) Deta Hedman | £221,000 |
| World Masters | Hungary | Budapest | Gerevich Aladár National Sports Hall | 1974 | (Netherlands) Jimmy van Schie | (Scotland) Lorraine Hyde | €35,000 |
| Dutch Open | Netherlands | Assen | De Bonte Wever | 1973 | (Germany) Paul Krohne | (Netherlands) Priscilla Steenbergen | €27,600 |

== Gold-ranked tournaments ==
| Tournament | Country | Current or last location | Current or last venue | Founded | Defending Men's Champion | Defending Women's Champion | Total Prize Money |
|---|---|---|---|---|---|---|---|
| Denmark Open | Denmark | Esbjerg | Granly Hockey Arena | 1974 | (England) James Beeton | (Scotland) Lorraine Hyde | DDK 96,800 |
| Las Vegas Open | (United States) USA | Las Vegas | Tuscany Casino | 1979 | (Canada) David Cameron | (England) Deta Hedman | $11,560 |
| South Australia Classic | Australia | Salisbury | LCDA | 2023 | (Australia) Brandon Weening | (Australia) Amanda Loch | $A11,785 |
| Irish Open | (Republic of Ireland) Ireland | Killarney | Gleneagle Hotel | 2008 | (Finland) Marko Kantele | (Scotland) Lorraine Hyde | €12,800 |
| New Zealand Open | New Zealand | Motueka | Motueka Rec Centre | 1981 | (New Zealand) Ben Robb | (New Zealand) Nicole Regnaud | NZ$10,340 |

== Silver-ranked tournaments ==
| Tournament | Country | Current or last location | Current or last venue | Founded | Defending Men's Champion | Defending Women's Champion | Total Prize Money |
|---|---|---|---|---|---|---|---|
| Antwerp Open | Belgium | Antwerp | Royal Yacht Club | 1988 | (Netherlands) Wesley Plaisier | (England) Deta Hedman | €7,200 |
| Belfry Open | Belgium | Bruges | Tempelhof | 2017 | (Belgium) Andy Baetens | (Netherlands) Aileen de Graaf | €8,000 |
| Belgium Open | Belgium | Antwerp | Royal Yacht Club | 1982 | (Belgium) Francois Schweyen | (Netherlands) Noa-Lynn van Leuven | €7,200 |
| Billie Hill Memorial | Australia | Alice Springs | The Gillen Club | 2024 | (Australia) Brandon Weening | (Australia) Joanne Hadley | A$6,800 |
| British Classic | England | Bridlington | Bridlington Spa | 1997 | (England) Connor Scutt | (England) Beau Greaves | £5,040 |
| British Open | England | Bridlington | Bridlington Spa | 1975 | (England) Carl Wilkinson | (England) Beau Greaves | £5,040 |
| Bruges Open | (Belgium) Belgium | Bruges | Tempelhof | 2017 | (Belgium) Andy Baetens | (England) Kirsty Hutchinson | €8,000 |
| Canterbury Classic | New Zealand | Christchurch | Canterbury & Suburban Clubrooms | 2013 | (New Zealand) Hayden Garing | (New Zealand) Nicole Regnaud | NZ$7,725 |
| Charlotte Open | (United States) USA | Charlotte | Sheraton Charlotte Airport | 2005 | (United States) Alex Spellman | (United States) Andrea Taylor | $5,010 |
| Denmark Masters | Denmark | Esbjerg | Granly Hockey Arena | 2014 | (Sweden) Andreas Harrysson | (England) Beau Greaves | DKK 50,200 |
| Egypt Darts Open | Egypt | Luxor | Sonesta St. George Hotel | 2019 | Basem Mahmood | (Uganda) Sarah Makanga | €8,000 |
| England Classic | England | Ilfracombe | Ilfracombe Holiday Park | 2009 | (England) Jarred Cole | (England) Deta Hedman | £10,905 |
| England Masters | England | Selsey | Bunn Leisure | 2009 | (England) Scott Mitchell | (England) Lisa Ashton | |
| England National Singles | England | Ilfracombe | Ilfracombe Holiday Village | 1995 | (England) Callum Francis | (England) Beau Greaves | £7,040 |
| England Open | England | Ilfracombe | Ilfracombe Holiday Village | 2008 | (Northern Ireland) Neil Duff | (England) Beau Greaves | £7,040 |
| Helvetia Open | Switzerland | Kloten | Sporthalle Ruebisbach | 2017 | (Switzerland) Stefan Bellmont | (England) Paula Jacklin | CHF 5,600 |
| Isle of Man Classic | Isle of Man | Douglas | Villa Marina | 2014 | (Scotland) Jim McEwan | (Sweden) Vicky Pruim | £7,060 |
| Isle of Man Masters | Isle of Man | Douglas | Villa Marina | 2018 | (England) Carl Wilkinson | (England) Beau Greaves | £7,060 |
| Italian Grand Masters | Italy | Bologna | Bologna Grand Hotel | 2009 | (England) James Hurrell | (Netherlands) Priscilla Steenbergen | €8,000 |
| Italian Open | Italy | Bologna | Bologna Grand Hotel | 2018 | (Belgium) Brian Raman | (Belgium) Irina Armstrong | |
| Ivy Hampton Memorial | Australia | Alice Springs | The Gillen Club | 2024 | (Australia) Brandon Weening | (Australia) Joanne Hadley | A$6,800 |
| Japan Open | Japan | Chiba | Chiba Chuo Hall KASE Bld | 1974 | (Japan) Jun Matsuda | (Japan) Mayumi Ouchi | YEN 60,400,000 |
| Las Vegas Classic | (United States) USA | Las Vegas | Tuscany Hotel & Casino | 2014 | (Canada) Jeff Smith | (England) Fallon Sherrock | $5,980 |
| Latvia Open | Latvia | Riga | Bellevue Park Hotel | 2004 | (Belgium) Francois Schweyen | (Sweden) Maud Jansson | €8,000 |
| New Zealand Masters | New Zealand | Porirua | Kapi Mana Clubrooms | 1994 | (New Zealand) Ben Robb | (New Zealand) Desi Mercer | NZ$7,550 |
| Pacific Masters | Australia | Moama | Rich River Golf Club | 1987 | (Australia) Raymond Smith | (England) Lisa Ashton | A$11,000 |
| Romanian Classic | Romania | Bucharest | Intercontinental Hotel | 2014 | (Netherlands) Jimmy van Schie | (England) Deta Hedman | €8,000 |
| Romanian Open | Romania | Bucharest | Intercontinental Hotel | 2010 | (Netherlands) Alexander Merkx | (England) Deta Hedman | €8,000 |
| Scottish Classic | Scotland | Renfrew | Cosmopolitan Hotel | 2014 | (Scotland) Glen Parsons | (Netherlands) Aileen de Graaf | £7,210 |
| Scottish Open | Scotland | Renfrew | Cosmopolitan Hotel | 1983 | (England) Gary Robson | (England) Fallon Sherrock | £7,210 |
| Slovak Open | Slovakia | Samorin | X-Bionic Sphere | 2018 | (Slovenia) Benjamin Pratnemer | (England) Paige Pauling | €8,020 |
| Sunshine State Classic | Australia | Brisbane | Inala Darts Club | 2009 | (Australia) Danny Porter | (New Zealand) Wendy Harper | A$7,000 |
| Swedish Masters | Sweden | Malmo | Scandic Hotel | 2022 | (Netherlands) Berry van Peer | (England) Beau Greaves | SEK 60,000 |
| Swedish Open | Sweden | Malmö | Scandic Hotel | 1969 | (Switzerland) Thomas Junghans | (England) Beau Greaves | SEK 70,000 |
| Swiss Open | Switzerland | Kloten | Sporthalle Ruebisbach | 1984 | (Netherlands) Jimmy van Schie | (England) Lisa Ashton | CHF 5,600 |
| Taranaki Open | New Zealand | New Plymouth | Taranaki Darts Association | 2019 | (New Zealand) Nic Southorn | (New Zealand) Desi Mercer | NZ$7,520 |
| Virginia Beach Classic | (United States) USA | Virginia Beach | Wyndham Virginia Beach Oceanfront | 1989 | (United States) Jason Brandon | (United States) Cali West | |
| Welsh Classic | Wales | Prestatyn | Pontins | 1998 | (England) Connor Levett | (England) Beau Greaves | £11,600 |
| Welsh Open | Wales | Prestatyn | Pontins | 1980 | (England) Martyn Turner | (England) Beau Greaves | £11,600 |
| Witch City Open | (United States) USA | Nashua | Marriott Nasha Courtyard | 1983 | (United States) Leonard Gates | (United States) Cali West | $6,080 |
| World Open | Netherlands | Assen | De Bonte Wever | 2022 | (Slovenia) Benjamin Pratnemer | (Netherlands) Aileen de Graaf | €8,000 |

== Bronze-ranked tournaments ==
| Tournament | Country | Current or last location | Current or last venue | Founded | Defending Men's Champion | Defending Women's Champion | Prize money |
|---|---|---|---|---|---|---|---|
| Apatin Open | Serbia | Apatin | Banja Junakovic | 2010 | (Croatia) Boris Krčmar | | €1,400 |
| Auckland Open | New Zealand | Auckland | | 2011 | (Australia) Craig Caldwell | | Unknown |
| Australian Grand Masters | Australia | Canberra | Canberra Labour Club | 1983 | (Australia) Peter Machin | | A$9,600 |
| Australian Masters | Australia | Geelong | Geelong Darts Association Club | 1979 | (Australia) James Bailey | | A$9,300 |
| Bob Jones Memorial | Canada | Trenton | Astra Lounge | 1995 | (Canada) Dave Cameron | | C$1,920 |
| Bulgarian Open | Bulgaria | Sofia | Ramada Hotel | 2013 | (Greece) Kostas Pantelidis | | €3,780 |
| Canterbury Open | New Zealand | Christchurch | Canterbury Suburban Clubrooms | 2005 | (Australia) Mal Cuming | (New Zealand) Wendy Harper | $NZ 6,325 |
| Camellia Classic | (United States) USA | Sacramento | Crowne Plaza Hotel | 2005 | (United States) Larry Butler | | $20,000 |
| Cleveland Darts Extraveganza | (United States) USA | Cleveland, OH | Sheraton Hotel | 2005 | (Canada) Bob Sinnaeve | | $15,000 |
| Colorado Open | (United States) USA | Denver | Doubletree | 2005 | (United States) Timmy Nicholl | | $20,000 |
| Estonia Open | Estonia | Tallinn | Hotel Dzingel | 2007 | (Lithuania) Darius Labanauskas | | €3,200 |
| Iceland Open | Iceland | Reykjavík | Reykjavík Dartclub, | 2015 | Jan McIntosh | Maud Jansson | ISK33,2M |
| Klondike Open | Canada | Edmonton | Sands Hotel | 1958 | (Canada) Ken MacNeil | | C$13,000 |
| Lakitelek Darts Classic | Hungary | Lakitelek | Lakitelek | 2024 | Hannes Schnier | Greta Tekauer | HUF 720,000 |
| Lakitelek Darts Masters | Hungary | Lakitelek | Lakitelek | 2024 | Sybren Gijbels | Jitka Cisarova | HUF 720,000 |
| Latvia Open | Latvia | Riga | Belle Vue Park Hotel | 2006 | (Finland) Ulf Ceder | | €2,400 |
| Lithuania Open | Lithuania | Trakai | Trasalis Trakai Resort & Spa | 2009 | (Lithuania) Darius Labanauskas | | €900 |
| Luxembourg Open | Luxembourg | Clervaux | Hall Polyvalent | 2010 | (Switzerland) Thomas Junghans | | €4,670 |
| Malta Open | Malta | Saint Pauls Bay | Topaz Hotel | 1986 | (Turkey) Umit Uygunsozlu | | €2,050 |
| New Zealand Masters | New Zealand | Porirua | | 1992 | (New Zealand) Peter Hunt | | NZD$5,700 |
| NZDC North Island Masters | New Zealand | Hastings | | 2009 | (New Zealand) Cody Harris | | Unknown |
| Pacific Masters | Australia | Rockingham, Western Australia | Gary Holland Community Centre | 1977 | (Australia) Peter Machin | | A$9,600 |
| Quebec Open | Canada | Quebec | Best Western Hotel | 2005 | (Canada) Dawson Murschell | | C$7,500 |
| Riga Open | Latvia | Riga | Bellevue Hotel | 2012 | (Lithuania) Darius Labanauskas | | €1,200 |
| Seacoast Open | (United States) USA | Andover, | Wyndham Boston Andover | 2014 | (United States) Larry Butler | | $25,400 |
| Sunshine State Classic | Australia | Brisbane | Inala Darts Club | 2009 | (Australia) Nathan Paice | | A6,600 |
| Ted Clements Memorial Open | New Zealand | Levin | Levin Cosmopolitan Club | 2005 | (New Zealand) Ben Robb | | NZD$3,020 |
| Trakai Castle Cup | Lithuania | Trakai | Grand Hall of Trakai Island Castle | 2010 | (England) Russell Jenkins | | €5,750 |
| Turkish Open | Turkey | Antalya (host city changes) | Limak Limra Hotel (host venue changes) | 2009 | (Wales) Jim Williams | | €9,330 |
| Uganda Open | Uganda | Kampala | | 2012 | (Uganda) Ronald Kalete | | Unknown |
| Victoria Easter Classic | Australia | Geelong | White Eagle House | 2015 | (Australia) Robbie King | | A$3,100 |
| West Coast Classic | Australia | Belmont, Perth | Belmont Sport and Recreation Club | 2005 | (Australia) Damon Heta | | AUS$5,000 |
| Catalonia Open | Catalonia | Calella | Fàbrica Llobet | 2012 | (Netherlands) Jimmy van Schie | (Belgium) Patricia de Peuter | €3,400 |
| FCD Anniversary Open | Catalonia | Calella | Fàbrica Llobet | 2015 | (Catalonia) Daniel Zapata | (Hungary) Gréta Tekauer | €3,400 |

== Special category events ==
| Tournament | Country | Current or last location | Current or last venue | Founded | Draw | Defending champion | Prize money |
|---|---|---|---|---|---|---|---|
| BDO Gold Cup | England | Host location | Host venue | 1978 | 64 | (England) Brian Dawson | Unknown |
| BDO World Trophy | England | Blackpool | Blackpool Tower | 2014 | 32 | (England) James Wilson | £80,000 |
| England Open | England | Host location | Host venue | 1995 | 64 | (Netherlands) Wesley Harms | £15,400 |
| England Masters | England | Host location | Host venue | 2009 | 64 | (England) Scott Mitchell | £4,640 |
| Isle of Man Open | Isle of Man | Douglas | | 1986 | 64 | (England) Dennis Harbour | £10,320 |
| Italian Open | Italy | Host location | Host venue | 2009 | 64 | | |
| Welsh Open | Wales | Host location | Host venue | 1986 | 64 | (Netherlands) Wesley Harms | €6,300 |

== Major International events ==
| Tournament | Country | Current or last location | Current or last venue | Founded | Draw | Defending champion | Medals |
|---|---|---|---|---|---|---|---|
| WDF World Cup | (United Nations) Host country every two years | Host country city | Host country venue | 1977 | 128 | Japan (men's overall) (Austria) Franko Giuliani (men's singles) (Italy) A. Bassetti & D. Petri (men's pairs); Wales (men's team) (Republic of Ireland) Ireland (women's overall) (Philippines) Lovely-Mae Orbeta (women's singles); K. Iwao & S. Sato (women's pairs) (Republic of Ireland) Ireland (women's team); Netherlands (youth overall) (Canada) Peyton Hammond (boys' singles) (Turkey) Ayşegül Karagöz (girls' singles); K. Steinbach & K. Kersbergen (youth mixed) | Gold; Silver; Bronze |
| WDF Americas Cup | (United Nations) Host country every two years | Host country city | Host country venue | 2002 | 128 | United States (overall) (The Bahamas) Robin Albury (men's singles); Sandy Hudson (women's singles) | Gold; Silver; Bronze |
| WDF Asia-Pacific Cup | (United Nations) Host country every two years | Host country city | Host country venue | 1980 | 128 | Mongolia (men's overall); Mitsuhiko Tatsunami (men's singles) (Hong Kong) H. Ching & Y. Tang (men's pairs); Chinese Taipei (men's team); Japan (women's overall); Yukie Sakaguchi (women's singles) (South Korea) A. Kim & Y. Kim (women's pairs); Japan (women's team) | Gold; Silver; Bronze |
| WDF Europe Cup | (United Nations) Host country every two years | Host country city | Host country venue | 1978 | 128 | Sweden (men's overall); Sweden (men's team); Dennie Olde Kalter (men's singles); A. Harrysson & J. Engström (men's pairs); Netherlands (women's overall); Netherlands (women's team) (Republic of Ireland) Robyn Byrne (women's singles); A. Wajer & N. van Leuven (women's pairs) | Gold; Silver; Bronze |

== Other international events ==
Six Nations Cup

== Former events ==
| Tournament | Country | Final location | Final venue | Founded | Draw | Final champion | Prize money |
|---|---|---|---|---|---|---|---|
| Cyprus International Open | Cyprus | Host location | Host venue | 2009 | 128 | | |
| Hellinikon Open | Greece | Athens | Master & Billiards Drats Club | 2009 | 32 | (Greece) Kostas Pantelidis | |
| Greek Open | Greece | Athens | | 2006 | 32 | (Cyprus) John Michael | |
| Italian Open | Italy | Host location | Host venue | 2009 | 128 | | |
| International Darts League (Major) | Netherlands | Nijmegen | Triavium | 2003 | 128 | (Scotland) Gary Anderson | |
| Korean Open | South Korea | Seoul | | 2007 | 64 | | |
| Philippines Masters | Philippines | Manila | | | 64 | | |
| Philippines National Open | Philippines | Manila | | | 64 | | |
| World Darts Trophy (Major) | Netherlands | Utrecht | Vechtsebanen | 2002 | 128 | (Scotland) Gary Anderson | |
| Wales Classic | Wales | Host location | Host venue | 2004 | 128 | | |
| Wales Masters | Wales | Host location | Host venue | 2006 | 128 | | |

== See also ==
- List of BDO ranked tournaments
