= 2021 WDF calendar =

Tournament information
- Dates: Yearly
- Country: Worldwide
- Organisation(s): WDF
- Format: 501 Legs (men's & women's)
- Prize fund: Depends on tournament's category

2021 WDF season of darts comprises every tournament of World Darts Federation. The prize money of the tournaments may vary depending on category.

WDF most important tournaments are the WDF World Darts Championship, WDF World Masters or WDF World Cup.

2021 is the first year in which the calendar will be under WDF-sole management after the liquidation of BDO.

Due to COVID-19-related restrictions and lockdowns in many countries, calendar has been disrupted by the cancelling or postponing of several tournaments. WDF resumed their darts calendar in June 2021.

== Tournament categories, points & prize money ==
World Darts Federation		Points						
Category	Prize Fund ($)	1st	2nd	3/4	5/8	9/16	17/32	33/64
Platinum	It depends on each tournament	270	167	103	64	39	26	13
Gold	It depends on each tournament	180	111	68	43	26	17	9
Silver	It depends on each tournament	90	56	34	21	13	9	
Bronze	It depends on each tournament	45	28	17	11	6		

== Calendar ==
=== January–May ===
Date	Tournament	Cat.	Venue	City	Prize money	Men's			Women's		
Date	Tournament	Cat.	Venue	City	Prize money	winner	score	runner-up	winner	score	runner-up
January 24	Victorian Classic	Unranked	Italian Australian Club	(Australia) Morwell	AU$6,700	(Australia) Brody Klinge	8–5	(Australia) Steve Powell	(Australia) Tori Kewish	6–2	(Australia) Barb Smyth
January 29–February 3	Reykjavik International Games	Unranked	Bullseye Reykjavik	(Iceland) Reykjavík	n/a	(Iceland) Páll Pétursson	7–1	(Iceland) Matthías Friðriksson	(Iceland) Ingibjörg Magnúsdóttir	7–0	(Iceland) Sólveig Daníelsdóttir
February 7	Canterbury Classic	Unranked	Canterbury & Suburban Darts Assoc.	(New Zealand) Christchurch	NZ$6,500	(New Zealand) Warren Parry	6–4	(New Zealand) Ben Robb	(New Zealand) Wendy Harper	5–3	(New Zealand) Jo Steed
March 6	Missouri St. Patricks Open	Unranked	Inn at Grand Glaize	(United States) Osage Beach	$2,295	(United States) Steve Hilger	6–3	(United States) Steve Shope	(United States) Brittany Short	4–0	(United States) Brenda Roush
March 14	West Coast Classic	Unranked	Belmont Sports & Recreation Club	(Australia) Cloverdale	AU$3,520	(Australia) Tim Pusey	6–2	(Australia) Dave Burke	(Australia) Natalie Carter	5–0	(Australia) Dot McLeod
March 20	Budapest Classic	Unranked	János Simon Basketball Arena	(Hungary) Budapest	HUF1,334,000	(Hungary) Patrik Kovács	7–5	(Hungary) Pál Székely	(Hungary) Veronika Ihász	6–2	(Hungary) Adrienn Végső
March 21	Budapest Masters	Unranked	János Simon Basketball Arena	(Hungary) Budapest	HUF1,334,000	(Hungary) Patrik Kovács	7–2	(Hungary) József Rucska	(Hungary) Veronika Ihász	6–1	(Hungary) Adrienn Végső
April 3	South Island Masters	Unranked	Otepuni Community Hub	(New Zealand) Invercargill	NZ$6,000	(New Zealand) Ben Robb	6–3	(New Zealand) Bryan Steed	(New Zealand) Desi Mercer	5–3	(New Zealand) Jo Steed
April 4	Victorian Easter Classic	Unranked	Geelong Darts Club	(Australia) Geelong	AU$5,400	(Australia) Justin Thompson	8–6	(Australia) Brody Klinge	(Australia) Lavinia Hogg	6–2	(Australia) Tori Kewish
April 18	North Island Masters	Unranked	Hastings Dart Hall	(New Zealand) Hastings	NZ$3,480	(New Zealand) Ben Robb	6–2	(New Zealand) Brian Steed	(New Zealand) Wendy Harper	5–2	(New Zealand) Tina Osborne
May 22	Darts for Arch	Unranked	Roebuck VFW Post	(United States) Roebuck	$730	(United States) Ken Saathoff	bt.	(United States) Doug Wade	(United States) Sandy Hudson	bt.	(United States) Candra Archbold
May 23	Sunshine State Classic	Unranked	Inala Darts Club	(Australia) Inala	AU$5,900	(Australia) Ky Smith	6–5	(Australia) Jackson Davies	(Australia) Lorraine Burn	5–1	(Australia) Seini Vakanofiti

=== June ===
Date	Tournament	Cat.	Venue	City	Prize money	Men's			Women's		
Date	Tournament	Cat.	Venue	City	Prize money	winner	score	runner-up	winner	score	runner-up
June 6	Canterbury Open	Bronze	Canterbury & Suburban Darts Assoc.	(New Zealand) Christchurch	NZ$3,640	(New Zealand) Landon Gardiner	6–2	(New Zealand) Craig Ross	(New Zealand) Judy Fenton	5–3	(New Zealand) Tara Mears
June 12	International Youth Challenge	Silver	Szent István Hotel	(Hungary) Balatonlelle	n/a	(Hungary) Dávid Balogh	5–2	(Hungary) Balázs Pazonyi	No girl's draw		
June 13	Gibraltar Open	Bronze	George Federico Darts Hall	Gibraltar	£2,500	(England) Gavin Smith	4–0	(England) Mike Norton	(England) Laura Turner	4–0	(England) Mel Williams
June 19	New Zealand Masters	Silver	Kapi Mana Darts Association	(New Zealand) Porirua	NZ$6,120	(New Zealand) Warren Parry	6–5	(New Zealand) Mark Cleaver	(New Zealand) Nicole Regnaud	5–4	(New Zealand) Wendy Harper
June 19	Cherry Bomb International	Bronze	Fort Lauderdale Marriott	(United States) Coral Springs	$3,850	(United States) Jules van Dongen	6–4	(United States) Danny Lauby Jr.	(United States) Dani Warmack	6–4	(United States) Cris Cwalinski

=== July ===
Date	Tournament	Cat.	Venue	City	Prize money	Men's			Women's		
Date	Tournament	Cat.	Venue	City	Prize money	winner	score	runner-up	winner	score	runner-up
July 3	John Wilkie Memorial	Silver	Hutt Valley Darts Association	(New Zealand) Taitā	NZ$5,880	(New Zealand) Ben Robb	6–1	(New Zealand) Jimmy Samuels	(New Zealand) Wendy Harper	5–0	(New Zealand) Tina Osborne
July 12	Charlotte Open	Bronze	Sheraton Airport Hotel	(United States) Charlotte	$3,600	(United States) Jules van Dongen	6–3	(United States) Jason Brandon	(United States) Paula Murphy	5–2	(United States) Heather Howard
July 17	Slovenia Open	Bronze	Austria Trend Hotel	(Slovenia) Ljubljana	€2,500	(Slovenia) Benjamin Pratnemer	7–2	(Slovenia) Silvo Javornik	(Slovenia) Mojca Mužić	6–5	(Slovenia) Branka Krček
July 24	Apatin Open	Bronze	Apatin Tehnička škola	(Serbia) Apatin	€2,580	(Romania) László Kádár	6–5	(Serbia) Oliver Ferenc	(Hungary) Veronika Ihász	6–1	(Hungary) Adrienn Végső

=== August ===
Date	Tournament	Cat.	Venue	City	Prize money	Men's			Women's		
Date	Tournament	Cat.	Venue	City	Prize money	winner	score	runner-up	winner	score	runner-up
August 4	New Zealand Open	Silver	Motueka Recreation Centre	(New Zealand) Motueka	NZ$7,240	(New Zealand) Haupai Puha	6–2	(New Zealand) AJ Te Kira	(New Zealand) Desi Mercer	5–3	(New Zealand) Mary-Anne Teinaki
August 21	Salavat Yulaev Cup	Bronze	Bashkir State Agrarian University	(Russia) Ufa	RUB_ n/a	(Russia) Boris Koltsov	5–1	(Russia) Aleksei Kadochnikov	(Russia) Elena Shulgina	4–2	(Russia) Natalia Aleksandrova

=== September ===
Date	Tournament	Cat.	Venue	City	Prize money	Men's			Women's		
Date	Tournament	Cat.	Venue	City	Prize money	winner	score	runner-up	winner	score	runner-up
September 3	Blueberry Hill Open	Non-ranked	Blueberry Hill	(United States) University City	$1,500	(United States) Jordan Meyer	3–1	(United States) Bobby Dees Jr.	(United States) Brenda Roush	3–0	(United States) Kimberly Hawthorne
September 4	Washington Area Open	Bronze	Holiday Inn	(United States) Sterling	$2,950	(United States) Bruce Robbins	6–3	(United States) Joe Huffman	(United States) Dani Warmack	5–1	(United States) Marlise Kiel
September 4	Catalonia Open	Bronze	Fábrica Llobet-Gurí	(Catalonia) Calella	€5,720	(Belgium) Andy Baetens	5–0	(Catalonia) Martín Martí Santamaría	(Netherlands) Aileen de Graaf	4–1	(Sweden) Anna Forsmark
September 5	FCD Anniversary Open	Bronze	Fábrica Llobet-Gurí	(Catalonia) Calella	€2,760	(Belgium) Andy Baetens	5–1	(Catalonia) Daniel Zapata	(Netherlands) Aileen de Graaf	4–1	(England) Paula Jacklin
September 10–12	England National Singles	Silver	Bunn Leisure Holiday Centre	(England) Selsey	£7,300	(Northern Ireland) Neil Duff	5–4	(Belgium) Brian Raman	(England) Fallon Sherrock	5–3	(Russia) Anastasia Dobromyslova
September 11–12	England Open	Gold	Bunn Leisure Holiday Centre	(England) Selsey	£21,600	(Belgium) Brian Raman	6–2	(England) Ian Jones	(England) Deta Hedman	6–2	(Russia) Anastasia Dobromyslova
September 11	Kalashnikov Cup	Bronze	Izhevsk State Medical Academy	(Russia) Izhevsk	RUB_ n/a	(Russia) Roman Obukhov	6–3	(Russia) Kirill Fadeev	(Russia) Natalia Aleksandrova	5–2	(Russia) Elena Shulgina
September 12	Udmurtia Open	Bronze	Izhevsk State Medical Academy	(Russia) Izhevsk	RUB_ n/a	(Russia) Roman Obukhov	4–1	(Russia) Kirill Fadeev	(Russia) Elena Shulgina	4–1	(Russia) Ksenia Klochek
September 19	North Queensland Classic	Silver	Townsville Darts Association	(Australia) Annandale	AU$6,000	(Australia) Raymond Smith	6–1	(Australia) Donovan Lottering	(Australia) Maureen Homer	5–3	(Australia) Eva Dilger

=== October ===
Date	Tournament	Cat.	Venue	City	Prize money	Men's			Women's		
Date	Tournament	Cat.	Venue	City	Prize money	winner	score	runner-up	winner	score	runner-up
October 2	Denmark Open	Gold	Granly Hockey Arena	(Denmark) Esbjerg	DKK133,000	(France) Thibault Tricole	6–3	(Sweden) Andreas Harrysson	(Netherlands) Anca Zijlstra	5–2	(Russia) Anastasia Dobromyslova
October 3	Denmark Masters	Silver	Granly Hockey Arena	(Denmark) Esbjerg	DKK53,800	(Netherlands) Richard Veenstra	6–5	(Sweden) Ricky Nauman	(England) Deta Hedman	5–2	(Netherlands) Aileen de Graaf
October 9–10	Klondike Open	Silver	River Cree Resort & Casino	(Canada) Enoch	C$4,750	(Canada) Shawn Burt	5–2	(Canada) Dawson Murschell	(Canada) Brenda Moreau	4–2	(Canada) Michelle Spicer
October 14	Virginia Beach Classic	Silver	Wyndham Virginia Beach Oceanfront	(United States) Virginia Beach	$6,685	(United States) Leonard Gates	6–1	(United States) Danny Lauby Jr.	(United States) Marlise Kiel	6–5	(United States) Julie Weger
October 15–17	British Open	Gold	Bridlington Spa	(England) Bridlington	€17,000	(England) Scott Marsh	6–5	(England) Connor Scutt	(England) Fallon Sherrock	5–2	(Australia) Corrine Hammond
October 16–17	British Classic	Silver	Bridlington Spa	(England) Bridlington	€7,000	(Scotland) Jim McEwan	6–5	(England) Rhys Hayden	(Scotland) Lorraine Hyde	5–1	(Northern Ireland) Denise Cassidy
October 22	Red Dragon Welsh Classic	Silver	Prestatyn Sands Holiday Park	(Wales) Prestatyn	£10,320	(France) Thibault Tricole	6–2	(Wales) Jim Williams	(England) Beau Greaves	5–2	(England) Kirsty Hutchinson
October 24	Red Dragon Welsh Open	Gold	Prestatyn Sands Holiday Park	(Wales) Prestatyn	£23,120	(Scotland) Cameron Menzies	6–0	(England) James Hurrell	(England) Kirsty Hutchinson	5–4	(England) Beau Greaves
October 30	Dreher Hungarian Classic	Bronze	Danubius Hotel Hungaria City Center	(Hungary) Budapest	HUF1,360,000	(Scotland) Mark Barilli	6–3	(England) Nick Fullwell	(England) Deta Hedman	5–0	(Hungary) Adrienn Vegső
October 31	Dreher Hungarian Masters	Silver	Danubius Hotel Hungaria City Center	(Hungary) Budapest	HUF2,800,000	(Russia) Aleksei Kadochnikov	6–5	(England) Antony Allen	(England) Deta Hedman	5–0	(Russia) Elena Shulgina

=== November ===
Date	Tournament	Cat.	Venue	City	Prize money	Men's			Women's		
Date	Tournament	Cat.	Venue	City	Prize money	winner	score	runner-up	winner	score	runner-up
November 9–11	Malta Open	Silver	Kirkop Sports Complex	(Malta) Kirkop	€8,000	(Belgium) John Desreumaux	5–3	(England) John Scott	(England) Paula Jacklin	5–4	(Italy) Aurora Fochesato
November 13	Seacoast Open	Gold	DoubleTree by Hilton	(United States) Andover	$6,000	(Netherlands) Jules van Dongen	6–4	(United States) Kevin Luke	(United States) Paula Murphy	6–2	(United States) Dani Warmack
November 13	Winmau Irish Open	Gold	Gleneagle Hotel	(Republic of Ireland) Killarney	€18,400	(England) Luke Littler	6–2	(Northern Ireland) Barry Copeland	(Russia) Anastasia Dobromyslova	5–4	(England) Deta Hedman
November 14	Winmau HPR Irish Classic	Silver	Gleneagle Hotel	(Republic of Ireland) Killarney	€8,000	(Scotland) Shaun McDonald	5–3	(Northern Ireland) Josh Rock	(England) Deta Hedman	5–2	(Australia) Corrine Hammond
November 14	Challenger Classic	Bronze	Redlands Multi Sports Club	(Australia) Birkdale	AU$5,000	(Australia) Raymond Smith	6–1	(Australia) Jeremy Fagg	(Australia) Vanessa James	6–2	(Australia) Vivia Matson
November 20	Czech Open	Silver	OREA Hotel Pyramida	(Czech Republic) Prague	CZK300,200	(Belgium) Andy Baetens	5–0	(Scotland) Mark Barilli	(England) Deta Hedman	5–4	(England) Laura Turner
November 20	Oregon Open	Bronze	Sheraton Portland Airport Hotel	(United States) Portland	$2,160	(United States) David Fatum	6–1	(United States) Carlos Calderon	(United States) Lisa Tyler	5–2	(Croatia) Tanja Bencic
November 27	Italian Grand Masters	Silver	Grand Hotel Bologna	(Italy) Pieve di Cento	€8,000	(Netherlands) Richard Veenstra	5–3	(England) James Hurrell	(England) Maria O'Brien	5–1	(Netherlands) Priscilla Steenbergen
November 28	Italian Open	Bronze	Grand Hotel Bologna	(Italy) Pieve di Cento	€4,370	(Netherlands) Chris Landman	5–2	(Netherlands) Richard Veenstra	(England) Maria O'Brien	4–3	(Netherlands) Aileen de Graaf
November 27	Russian Open	Bronze	Restaurant PALMA	(Russia) Saint Petersburg	RUB231,000	(Russia) Vladimir Akshulakov	6–4	(Russia) Artem Klyuev	(Russia) Elena Shulgina	5–1	(Russia) Ksenia Klochek
November 28	Saint Petersburg Open	Bronze	Restaurant PALMA	(Russia) Saint Petersburg	RUB184,500	(Russia) Aleksei Kadochnikov	6–2	(Belarus) Andrey Pontus	(Russia) Ksenia Klochek	5–2	(Russia) Alisa Burykina

=== December ===
Date	Tournament	Cat.	Venue	City	Prize money	Men's			Women's		
Date	Tournament	Cat.	Venue	City	Prize money	winner	score	runner-up	winner	score	runner-up
December 5	WDF World Championship Qualifiers	WDF	Lakeside Country Club	(England) Frimley Green		(England) Johnny Haines	6–5	(England) Scott Walters	(Wales) Rhian O'Sullivan	5–3	(Republic of Ireland) Robyn Byrne
December 5	WDF World Championship Qualifiers	WDF	Lakeside Country Club	(England) Frimley Green		(England) Jarred Cole	6–3	(England) Terry Stubbs			
December 5	WDF World Championship Qualifiers	WDF	De Bonte Wever	(Netherlands) Assen		(Belgium) Mario Vandenbogaerde	6–2	(Belgium) Kenny Neyens	(Netherlands) Marjolein Noijens	5–4	(Netherlands) Vanessa Zuidema
December 5	WDF World Championship Qualifiers	WDF	De Bonte Wever	(Netherlands) Assen		(Netherlands) Ryan de Vreede	6–5	(Netherlands) Danny Jansen			

=== Tournaments cancelled ===
Following tournaments have been postponed until 2022.

Tournaments postponed to 2022

Date	Tournament	Cat.	Venue	City	Prize money	Men's			Women's		
Date	Tournament	Cat.	Venue	City	Prize money	winner	score	runner-up	winner	score	runner-up
January 25	~~Romanian Classic~~	Silver	InterContinental Hotel	(Romania) Bucharest	RON 24,160						
January 26	~~Romanian International~~	Silver	InterContinental Hotel	(Romania) Bucharest	RON 46,000						
February 19–21	~~Scottish Open~~	Gold	Normandy Cosmopolitan Hotel	(Scotland) Renfrew	£10,550						
March 6	~~Halifax Open~~	Bronze	Bedford Legion Club	(Canada) Bedford	C$2,560						
March 11–14	~~Isle of Man Classic~~	Silver	Villa Marina	(Isle of Man) Douglas	£8,000						
March 13–14	~~Isle of Man Open~~	Gold	Villa Marina	(Isle of Man) Douglas	£15,500						
April 5	~~Geelong Club Singles~~	Bronze	Geelong Darts Club	(Australia) Geelong	AU$4,800						
April 7–10	~~Egypt Open~~	Bronze	Blue House Hotel	(Egypt) Marsa Alam	$27,000						
April 9–11	~~White Mountain Shootout~~	Bronze	Town & Country Inn & Resort	(United States) Shelburne	$4,900						
April 17	~~Estonia Open~~	Bronze	Radisson Blu Hotel Tallinn	(Estonia) Tallinn	€2,530						
April 19	~~Estonia Masters~~	Bronze	Radisson Blu Hotel Tallinn	(Estonia) Tallinn	€1,990						
April 24–25	~~Slovak Masters~~	Silver	x-bionic® sphere	(Slovakia) Šamorín	€8,460						
April 25	~~Slovak Open~~	Silver	x-bionic® sphere	(Slovakia) Šamorín	€8,460						
April 25	~~Murray Bridge GP~~	Bronze	Murray Bridge Darts Club	(Australia) Murray Bridge	AU$5,930						
June 13	~~Melton Classic~~	Bronze	Melton Dart Club	(Australia) Melton	$5,850						
June 17–21	~~Six Nations Cup~~ (T)	EDO	Normandy Hotel	(Scotland) Renfrew	£3,000						
June 18–20	~~Canadian Open~~	Bronze	Centre 200	(Canada) Sydney	C$6,000						
June 26–27	~~Australian Grand Masters~~	Silver	Canberra Labour Club	(Australia) Canberra	AU$11,300						
June 25–27	~~Austrian Open Vienna~~	Bronze	Hilton Garden Inn	(Austria) Vienna	€2,260						
June 26–27	~~Vienna Open~~	Bronze	Hilton Garden Inn	(Austria) Vienna	€2,260						
July 24	~~Luxembourg Open~~	Bronze	D'Coque	Luxembourg City	€7,250						
July 25	~~Luxembourg Masters~~	Bronze	D'Coque	Luxembourg City	€7,250						
July 25	~~Japan Open~~	Bronze	Ota-Ku Sangyo Plaza PIO	(Japan) Tokyo	JP¥1,240,000						
July 23–25	~~WDF Americas Cup~~ (S)	WDF	–	(Jamaica) Kingston	n/a						
July 24–25	~~WDF Americas Cup~~ (T)	WDF	–	(Jamaica) Kingston	n/a						
August 7	~~Antwerp Open~~	Silver	Royal Yacht Club België	(Belgium) Antwerp	€8,120						
August 8	~~Belgium Open~~	Silver	Royal Yacht Club België	(Belgium) Antwerp	€8,120						
August 13	~~LDO Swedish Classic~~	Bronze	Scandic Triangle Hotel	(Sweden) Malmö	SEK12,400						
August 14	~~Swedish Open~~	Silver	Scandic Triangle Hotel	(Sweden) Malmö	SEK117,400						
August 15	~~Gents Classic~~	Bronze	Scandic Triangle Hotel	(Sweden) Malmö	SEK12,400						
August 21	~~French Open~~	Bronze	Salle Dany Boon	(France) Bray-Dunes	€7,800						
August 22	~~French Classic~~	Bronze	Salle Dany Boon	(France) Bray-Dunes	€5,210						
September 11	~~Taranaki Open~~	Silver	Taranaki Darts Association	(New Zealand) New Plymouth	NZ$6,120						
September 7–9	~~WDF Asia-Pacific Cup~~ (S)	WDF	–	(Taiwan) Taipei	n/a						
September 10–12	~~WDF Asia-Pacific Cup~~ (T)	WDF	–	(Taiwan) Taipei	n/a						
September 11–12	~~Taiwan Open~~	Bronze	NTSU	(Taiwan) Taoyuan	NT$83,000						
September 18	~~Auckland Open~~	Bronze	West City Darts Association	(New Zealand) Rānui	NZ$3,750						
September 29–Oct. 2	~~WDF Europe Cup~~ (S)	WDF	–	(Spain)	n/a						
September 28–Oct. 2	~~WDF Europe Cup~~ (T)	WDF	–	(Spain)	n/a						
October 3	~~Australian Masters~~	Bronze	Geelong Darts Club	(Australia) Geelong	AU$16,000						
October 10	~~Bunbury Grand Prix~~	Bronze	–	(Australia) Bunbury	–						
October 16–17	~~N. Ireland Open~~	Silver	Bellini's	(Northern Ireland) Newry	£4,650						
October 16–17	~~N. Ireland Matchplay~~	Silver	Bellini's	(Northern Ireland) Newry	£4,650						
October 23	~~Alan King Memorial~~	Bronze	Otago Darts Association	(New Zealand) Dunedin	NZ$4,000						
October 23	~~Tórshavn Open~~	Bronze	Glasir Sports Hall	(Faroe Islands) Tórshavn	kr.19,400						
October 24	~~Faroe Islands Open~~	Bronze	Glasir Sports Hall	(Faroe Islands) Tórshavn	kr.19,400						
October 24	~~Bob Jones Memorial~~	Bronze	Astra Lounge, CFB Trenton	(Canada) Trenton	C$4,500						
October 28–29	~~Turkish Open~~	Bronze	Göynük Atatürk Spor Salonu	(Turkey) Kemer	n/a						
October 30–31	~~Turkish Masters~~	Bronze	Göynük Atatürk Spor Salonu	(Turkey) Kemer	n/a						
November 7	~~Pacific Masters~~	Bronze	Rich River Golf Club	(Australia) Moama	AU$9,880						
November 6–7	~~Welsh Masters~~	Silver	Lyons Robin Hood Holiday Park	(Wales) Rhyl	–						
November 20	~~Latvia Open~~	Bronze	Bellevue Park Hotel	(Latvia) Riga	€4,840						
November 21	~~Riga Open~~	Bronze	Bellevue Park Hotel	(Latvia) Riga	€4,225						
November 21	~~Great Lakes Open~~	Bronze	Club Forster	(Australia) Forster	AU$4,380						
November 21	~~Ted Clements Memorial~~	Bronze	Levin Cosmopolitan Club	(New Zealand) Levin	NZ$3,000						
December 2–5	~~WDF World Masters~~	WDF	De Bonte Wever	(Netherlands) Assen	£70,500						
December 18	~~Belfry Open~~	Silver	Sporthal Tempelhof	(Belgium) Bruges	€7,725						
December 19	~~Bruges Open~~	Silver	Sporthal Tempelhof	(Belgium) Bruges	€7,725						

== Statistical information ==
The players/nations are sorted by:

1. Total number of titles;
2. Cumulated importance of those titles;
3. Alphabetical order (by family names for players).

=== Titles won by player (men's) ===
Total	Player	Category			
Total	Player	Platinum	Gold	Silver	Bronze
3	Jules van Dongen (USA)		●		● ●
3	Andy Baetens (BEL)			●	● ●
2	Thibault Tricole (FRA)		●	●	
2	Richard Veenstra (NED)			● ●	
2	Aleksei Kadochnikov (RUS)			●	●
2	Raymond Smith (AUS)			●	●
2	Roman Obukhov (RUS)				● ●
1	Luke Littler (ENG)		●		
1	Scott Marsh (ENG)		●		
1	Cameron Menzies (SCO)		●		
1	Brian Raman (BEL)		●		
1	Shawn Burt (CAN)			●	
1	John Desreumaux (BEL)			●	
1	Neil Duff (NIR)			●	
1	Leonard Gates (USA)			●	
1	Shaun McDonald (SCO)			●	
1	Jim McEwan (SCO)			●	
1	Warren Parry (NZL)			●	
1	Haupai Puha (NZL)			●	
1	Ben Robb (NZL)			●	
1	Vladimir Akshulakov (RUS)				●
1	Mark Barilli (SCO)				●
1	David Fatum (USA)				●
1	Landon Gardiner (NZL)				●
1	László Kádár (ROM)				●
1	Boris Koltsov (RUS)				●
1	Chris Landman (NED)				●
1	Benjamin Pratnemer (SLO)				●
1	Bruce Robbins (USA)				●
1	Gavin Smith (ENG)				●

=== Titles won by nation (men's) ===
Total	Nation	Category			
Total	Nation	Platinum	Gold	Silver	Bronze
6	United States (USA)		●	●	● ● ● ●
5	Belgium (BEL)		●	● ●	● ●
4	Scotland (SCO)		●	● ●	●
4	New Zealand (NZL)			● ● ●	●
6	Russia (RUS)			●	● ● ● ● ●
3	England (ENG)		● ●		●
3	Netherlands (NED)			● ●	●
2	France (FRA)		●	●	
2	Australia (AUS)			●	●
1	Canada (CAN)			●	
1	Northern Ireland (NIR)			●	
1	Romania (ROM)				●
1	Slovenia (SLO)				●

=== Titles won by player (women's) ===
Total	Player	Category			
Total	Player	Platinum	Gold	Silver	Bronze
6	Deta Hedman (ENG)		●	● ● ● ●	●
3	Elena Shulgina (RUS)				● ● ●
2	Fallon Sherrock (ENG)		●	●	
2	Paula Murphy (USA)		●		●
2	Maria O'Brien (ENG)			●	●
2	Aileen de Graaf (NED)				● ●
2	Dani Warmack (USA)				● ●
1	Anastasia Dobromyslova (RUS)		●		
1	Kirsty Hutchinson (ENG)		●		
1	Anca Zijlstra (NED)		●		
1	Beau Greaves (ENG)			●	
1	Wendy Harper (NZL)			●	
1	Lorraine Hyde (SCO)			●	
1	Maureen Homer (AUS)			●	
1	Paula Jacklin (ENG)			●	
1	Marlise Kiel (USA)			●	
1	Desi Mercer (NZL)			●	
1	Brenda Moreau (CAN)			●	
1	Nicole Regnaud (NZL)			●	
1	Natalia Aleksandrova (RUS)				●
1	Judy Fenton (NZL)				●
1	Veronika Ihász (HUN)				●
1	Vanessa James (AUS)				●
1	Ksenia Klochek (RUS)				●
1	Mojca Mužić (SLO)				●
1	Laura Turner (ENG)				●
1	Lisa Tyler (USA)				●

=== Titles won by nation (women's) ===
Total	Nation	Category			
Total	Nation	Platinum	Gold	Silver	Bronze
14	England (ENG)		● ● ●	● ● ● ● ● ● ● ●	● ● ●
6	United States (USA)		●	●	● ● ● ●
6	Russia (RUS)		●		● ● ● ● ●
4	New Zealand (NZL)			● ● ●	●
3	Netherlands (NED)		●		● ●
2	Australia (AUS)			●	●
1	Canada (CAN)			●	
1	Scotland (SCO)			●	
1	Hungary (HUN)				●
1	Slovenia (SLO)				●

== Rankings ==
Only the best ten points achievements by players in WDF Ranked Tournaments accounts towards the WDF Rankings

Updated to November 28, 2021

=== Men's ===
Rank	Player	Points
1	(Belgium) Brian Raman	676
2	(Wales) Jim Williams	427
3	(France) Thibault Tricole	403
=	(Wales) Wayne Warren	403
5	(Scotland) Ross Montgomery	395
6	(Northern Ireland) Neil Duff	356
7	(England) James Hurrell	351
8	(Belgium) Andy Baetens	326
9	(England) Luke Littler	314
10	(Netherlands) Richard Veenstra	299

=== Women's ===
Rank	Player	Points
1	(England) Deta Hedman	980
2	(Russia) Anastasia Dobromyslova	688
3	(England) Fallon Sherrock	650
4	(Netherlands) Anca Zijlstra	607
5	(Netherlands) Aileen de Graaf	581
6	(England) Beau Greaves	570
7	(England) Kirsty Hutchinson	479
8	(England) Maria O'Brien	410
9	(England) Lorraine Winstanley	368
10	(Australia) Corrine Hammond	359
