= 2017 Auckland Open (darts) =

Auckland Open

Tournament information
- Dates: September 16 2017
- Location: Auckland
- Country: New Zealand
- Organisation(s): BDO, WDF, NZDC

2017 Auckland Open is a darts tournament that took place in Auckland, New Zealand, in 2017.

== Draw ==
=== Last 16 ===
- (New Zealand) Josh Roberts beat (New Zealand) Cody Harris
- (New Zealand) Steve Davis beat (New Zealand) John Kelly
- (New Zealand) Greg Moss beat (New Zealand) Arnold Robson
- (New Zealand) Craig Caldwell beat (New Zealand) Bruce Evans
- (New Zealand) Mark McGrath beat (New Zealand) Tyson Kauika
- (New Zealand) Tahuna Irwin beat (New Zealand) Mike Day
- (Australia) Mick Lacey beat (New Zealand) Peter Hunt
- (New Zealand) Deon Toki beat (New Zealand) Mark Cleaver

=== Quarter-finals ===
- (New Zealand) Steve Davis 4–0 (New Zealand) Josh Roberts
- (New Zealand) Craig Caldwell 4–1 (New Zealand) Greg Moss
- (New Zealand) Mark McGrath 4–2 (New Zealand) Tahuna Irwin
- (New Zealand) Deon Toki 4–0 (Australia) Mick Lacey

=== Semi-finals (best of 9 legs) ===
- (New Zealand) Craig Caldwell 5–1 (New Zealand) Steve Davis
- (New Zealand) Mark McGrath 5–3 (New Zealand) Deon Toki

=== Final (best of 11 legs) ===
- (New Zealand) Craig Caldwell 6–5 (New Zealand) Mark McGrath
