= List of BDO ranked tournaments =

The British Darts Organisation (BDO) organised many darts tournaments each year including Major titles such as the Lakeside World Professional Championship and the Winmau World Masters until its demise in September 2020. The Tournaments listed below were recognised BDO ranking events for the BDO Invitational Table point allocation system that determined players qualification for its Major tournament finals. The BDO's own tournaments are in bold.

== Tournament levels and points allocation ==
The BDO Invitational Table relates only to registered playing members of the BDO, who comply with BDO and World Darts Federation (WDF) eligibility rules including terms and conditions of the 1997 Tomlin Order. The BDO awards points depending on player's performances within each of its events. Twenty-seven points are awarded to the champion of each its three Major Events – The Lakeside World Professional Championship, The Bavaria World Darts Trophy and the Winmau World Masters. Lower points are awarded for each round of the tournament reached. Other events are placed into Category A+, A, B, C and D based on the prize-pool and number of payouts, with points for placings slowly decreasing. Only the best 12 placings are added for the players ranking that define seedings and qualification for events it stages. The BDO Invitational rankings sees the points wiped after the seedings for the World Championship are decided from the following 94 tournaments:

- The three BDO Major tournaments.
- The six BDO Category A+ tournaments.
- The ten BDO Category A tournaments.
- The nine BDO Category B tournaments.
- The fourteen BDO Category C tournaments.
- The forty eight BDO Category D tournaments.
- The four BDO Special Qualifiers tournaments.

== Ranking method ==
Since the formation of the BDO rankings in 1974 the method used to calculate a player's ranking points has changed several times.

=== Current points distribution ===
Points were awarded as follows:

Tournament category	**W**	F	SF	QF	R16	R32	R64	R128
BDO Major tournaments	49	42	35	28	21	14	7	4
BDO Category A+ tournaments	49	42	35	28	21	14	7	4
BDO Category A tournaments	35	30	25	20	15	10	5	
BDO Category B tournaments	24	20	16	12	8	4		
BDO Category C tournaments	18	15	12	9	6			
BDO Category D tournaments	14	12	10	8	6			
BDO Special Qualifiers tournaments	10	8	6					

== Current tournament categories ==
=== Majors ===
Tournament	Country	Current or last location	Current or last venue	Founded	Draw	Defending champion	Prize money
BDO World Darts Championship	England	London	Indigo at The O2	1978	128	(Wales) Wayne Warren	£300,000
World Masters	England	Bridlington	Bridlington Spa	1974	128	(Republic of Ireland) John O'Shea	£60,000
BDO World Trophy	England	Blackburn	King George's Hall	2014	128	(Wales) Jim Williams	£38,000

=== Category A+ ===
Tournament	Country	Current or last location	Current or last venue	Founded	Draw	Defending champion	Prize money
Dutch Open	Netherlands	Assen	De Bonte Wever	1973	128	(Scotland) Ross Montgomery	€33,350
England Classic	England	Selsey	Bunn Leisure Holiday Centre	2009	32	(Netherlands) Wesley Harms	£9,300
England Open	England	Host location	Host venue	1995	64	(Wales) Jim Williams	£15,400
Isle of Man Open	Isle of Man	Douglas	Villa Marina Complex, Central Promenade,	1986	64	(England) Scott Waites	£10,320
Welsh Open	Wales	Host location	Host venue	1986	64	(Netherlands) Martijn Kleermaker	€6,300

=== Category A ===
Tournament	Country	Current or last location	Current or last venue	Founded	Draw	Defending champion	Prize money
BDO British Classic	(United Kingdom) Great Britain	Bridlington	The Spa Bridlington	1997	32	(Netherlands) Dennie Olde Kalter	£7,600
BDO British Open	(United Kingdom) England	Bridlington	The Spa Bridlington	1975	64	(Netherlands) Wesley Harms	£12,400
BDO International Open	(United Kingdom) Great Britain	Llanelli	Gateway Resort	2008	32	(Wales) Jim Williams	£7,600
Belgium Open	Belgium	Antwerp	Royal Yacht Club of Belgium	1982	64	(England) Glen Durrant	€8,500
Denmark Open	Denmark	Esbjerg	Granly Hockey Arena	1974	64	(Netherlands) Wesley Harms	DKK 70,200
German Open	Germany	Bochum	Städtische Sporthalle Harpener Heide	1986	128	(Belgium) Mario Vandenbogaerde	€6,300
Scottish Open	Scotland	Renfrew	Normandy Cosmopolitan Hotel	1995	64	(Wales) Jim Williams	£12,400
Swedish Open	Sweden	Malmö	Scandic Hotel	1969	32	(Sweden) Dennis Nilsson	SEK 82,500
Turkish Open	Turkey	Antalya (host city changes)	Limak Limra Hotel (host venue changes)	2009	32	(England) Mark McGeeney	€9,330
Czech Open	(Czech Republic) Czechia	Prague	OREA Pyramida Hotel	1999	32	(Scotland) Ross Montgomery	GBP 7,000

Slovak Open

=== Category B ===
Tournament	Country	Current or last location	Current or last venue	Founded	Draw	Defending champion	Prize money
Antwerp Open	Belgium	Antwerp	Royal Yacht Club of Belgium	1988	64	(Netherlands) Wouter Vaes	€6,540
Australian Grand Masters	Australia	Canberra	Canberra Labour Club	1983	32	(Australia) Peter Machin	A$9,600
Australian Masters	Australia	Geelong	Geelong Darts Association Club	1979	32	(Australia) Damon Heta	A$9,300
Denmark Masters	Denmark	Esbjerg	Granly Hockey Arena	2014	32	(Belgium) Brian Raman	DKK 50,200
German Masters	Germany	Bochum	Dart Sport Club	2014	64	(England) Brian Dawson	€6,300
Scottish Classic	Scotland			2014	64	(England) Robert Douthwaite	£5,020

=== Category C ===
Tournament	Country	Current or last location	Current or last venue	Founded	Draw	Defending champion	Prize money
Catalonia Open	Spain	Barcelona	Old Factory Llobet Gurí, Calella	2011	32	(Denmark) Niels Heinsø	€4,000
England National Championships	England	Selsey	Host venue	2003	32	(England) Scott Mitchell	£4,140
England Masters	England	Selsey	Host venue	1973	64	(Wales) Jim Williams	£4,640
French Open	France	Gérardmer		1989	32	(Wales) Jim Williams	€6,580
Finnish Open	Finland	Helsinki	SOKOS Hotel	1981	32	(Russia) Boris Koltsov	€4,700
Japan Open	Japan	Tokyo	Ota Ku Sangyo Plaza PIO	2005	32	(Japan) Hiroshi Tanji	YEN 660,000
Luxembourg Open	Luxembourg	Clervaux	Hall Polyvalent	2010	32	(Belgium) Roger Janssen	€4,670
Northern Ireland Open	Northern Ireland	Newry	Bellini's	2003	64	(Wales) Jim Williams	£18,500
Polish Open	Poland	Police	Hotel Dobosz	2010	64	(England) Carl Wilkinson	PLN 16,000
Romanian Classic	Romania	Bucharest	Intercontinental Hotel	2014	32	(Greece) John Michael	€5,750
Romanian Open	Romania	Bucharest	Intercontinental Hotel	2010	32	(England) Dave Parletti	€5,750
Swiss Open	Switzerland	Lausen	MZH Stutz, Stutzstrasse 11	1984	32	(Germany) Michael Unterbuchner	CHF 6,880

=== Category D ===
Tournament	Country	Current or last location	Current or last venue	Founded	Draw	Defending champion	Prize money
ADO Shoot for the Moon	(United States) USA			2010	32	(United States) Larry Butler	Unknown
ADO Syracuse Open	(United States) USA			2010	32	(United States) Leonard Gates	Unknown
ADO White Mountain Shootout	(United States) USA			2010	32	(United States) Leonard Gates	Unknown
Auckland Open	New Zealand	Auckland		2011	32	(Australia) Mark McGrath	Unknown
Austrian Open	Austria	Vienna	Hotel am Wienerberg	2009	32	(Belgium) Roger Janssen	€1,440
Baltic Cup Open	Estonia	Pärnu	Villa Andropoff	2009	32	(England) Matt Dickinson	Unknown
Bob Jones Memorial	Canada	Trenton	Astra Lounge	1995	32	(Canada) Dave Cameron	C$1,920
Canadian Open	Canada	TBA	TBA	1985	32	(Canada) Nick Smith	C$5,300
Camellia Classic	(United States) USA	Sacramento	Crowne Plaza Hotel	2005	32	(United States) Chris White	$20,000
Canterbury Open	New Zealand	Christchurch	Cashmere Club	2009	32	(New Zealand) Mark McGrath	Unknown
Central Coast Australian Classic	Australia	City of Gosford	Central Coast Leagues Club	2003	32	(Australia) Raymond Smith	A$7,690
Cleveland Darts Extraveganza	(United States) USA	Sacramento	Sheraton Hotel	2005	32	(United States) Jim Widmayer	$15,000
Colorado Open	(United States) USA	Denver	Doubletree	2005	32	(United States) Leonard Gates	$20,000
Estonia Open	Estonia	Tallinn	Hotel Dzingel	2007	32	(Russia) Aleksandr Oreshkin	€2,200
FCD Anniversary Open	Spain	Calella	The Old Factory	2015	32	(Netherlands) Kay Smeets	€2,340
Finnish Classic	Finland	Helsinki	SOKOS Hotel	2014	32	(Sweden) Andreas Harrysson	€2,000
Greater Vancouver Open	Canada	Richmond, British Columbia	Sheraton Hotel	2010	32	(United States) David Fatum	C$2,800
Golden Nugget Classic	Australia			2014	32	(Australia) Rob Modra	A$
Halifax Open	Canada	Halifax, Nova Scotia	Bedford Legion Club	1973	32	(Canada) Kiley Edmunds	C$6990
Hong Kong Open	Hong Kong	Hong Kong	Kowloon Bay International Trade & Exhibition Centre	1989	32	(Hong Kong) Kai Fan Leung	HKD 26,000
Hungarian Open	Hungary	Budapest	Goya Eto Park Élményközpont	1999	32	(Slovenia) Benjamin Pratnemer	€1,950
Iceland Open	Iceland	Reykjavík	Reykjavík Dartclub,	2005	32	(Scotland) Dennis Watt	ISK 125,000
Italian Grand Masters	Italy	Bologna	Grand Hotel Bologna	2010	32	(Netherlands) Wesley Harms	€2,400
Japan Masters	Japan	Tokyo		2014	32	(Japan) Seigo Asada	YEN 660,000
Klondike Open	Canada	Edmonton	Sands Hotel	1958	32	(Canada) Kiley Edmunds	C$13,000
Las Vegas Open	(United States) USA	Las Vegas	Tuscany Casino	2000	64	(United States) Robbie Phillips	$30,000
Latvia Open	Latvia	Riga	Belle Vue Park Hotel	2006	32	(Lithuania) Darius Labanauskas	€2,400
Lithuania Open	Lithuania	Trakai	Trasalis Trakai Resort & Spa	2009	32	(Lithuania) Darius Labanauskas	€900
Malaysian Open	Malaysia	Kuala Lumpur	Phoenix Ballroom, Pearl International Hotel	2001	64	(Philippines) Christian Perez	MYR 40,000
Malta Open	Malta	Saint Pauls Bay	Topaz Hotel	1986	32	(Greece) John Michael	€2,050
Music City Open	Canada			2012	32	(Canada) Danny Lauby-jnr	
Newfoundland Labrador Spring Open	Canada			2013	32	(Canada) Dave Cameron	
New Zealand Masters	New Zealand	Porirua		1992	32	(New Zealand) Cody Harris	NZD5,700
New Zealand Open	New Zealand	Wainuiomata		1983	32	(New Zealand) Tahuna Irwin	
NZDC North Island Masters	New Zealand	Hastings		2009	32	(New Zealand) Darren Herewini	Unknown
Pennsylvania Open	(United States) USA			2015	32	(United States) Jim Widmayer	A$9,600
Police Masters	Poland	Police	Hotel Dobosz	2011	64	(Netherlands) Kay Smeets	PLN 16,000
Quebec Open	Canada	Quebec	Best Western Hotel	2005	32	(Canada) Ross Snook	C$7,500
Riga Open	Latvia	Riga	Bellevue Hotel	2012	32	(Lithuania) Darius Labanauskas	€1,200
NZDC South Island Masters	New Zealand			2013	32	(New Zealand) Peter Hunt	
Saint John Port City Open	Canada	Saint John		2015	32	(Lithuania) Jeff Smith	€1,200
Ted Clements Open	New Zealand	Levin		2009	32	(New Zealand) Mark Cleaver	A$9,300
Torremolinos Open	Spain	Torremolinos		1992	32	(Romania) Adrian Frim	£2,080
USA Darts Classic	(United States) USA	Stamford, Connecticut	Stamford Marriott Hotel	2004	32	(United States) Larry Butler	$20,000
Victoria Easter Classic	Australia	Geelong	White Eagle House	2015	32	(Australia) Harley Kemp	A$3,100
Virginia Beach Dart Classic	(United States) USA	Virginia Beach, Virginia	Wyndham Virginia Beach	1986	32	(United States) Larry Butler	$37,120
West Coast Classic	Australia	Belmont, Perth	Belmont Sport and Recreation Club	2005	32	(Australia) Dennis Parr	
Whyalla Open	Australia	Whyalla		1986	32	(Australia) Dan Chapman	A$16,000

== BDO Special Qualifiers ==
Tournament	Country	Current or last location	Current or last venue	Founded	Draw	Defending champion	Prize money
BDO European Grand Slam Qualifiers	(United Kingdom) Great Britain				128		
BDO Grand Slam Qualifiers	(United Kingdom) Great Britain				128		
BDO World Championship Qualifiers	(United Kingdom) Great Britain				128		
BICC Inter-County Championship	(United Kingdom) Great Britain				128		

== BDO other tournaments ==
Tournament	Country	Current or last location	Current or last venue	Founded	Draw	Defending champion	Prize money
BDO Gold Cup	England	Host location	Host venue	1974	64	(England) Brian Dawson	Unknown
British Pentathlon	(United Kingdom) Great Britain			1976	64	(England) Jamie Hughes	£4,500

== Former ranked tournaments ==
Tournament	Country	Final location	Final venue	Founded	Draw	Final champion	Prize money
Autumn Gold Cider Masters	(United Kingdom) Great Britain			1984–1987	32	(England) John Lowe	
British Matchplay (former Major)	(United Kingdom) Great Britain			1976–1983	128	(Australia) Terry O'Dea	
British Professional Championship (former Major)	(United Kingdom) Great Britain			1981–1988	128	(Scotland) Jocky Wilson	
Bullseye Darts Championship	(United Kingdom) Great Britain			1979–1981	128	(Scotland) Jocky Wilson	
Butlins Grand Masters (former Major)	(United Kingdom) Great Britain			1979–1987	128	(Scotland) Jocky Wilson	
Dallas-Fort Worth Metroplex Open	(United States) USA			2012–2014	64	(United States) Leonard Gates	
Double Diamond Masters	(United Kingdom) Great Britain			1982–1987	32	(England) Reg Harding	
Greek Open	Greece			2006–2014	32	(Greece) John Michael	
European Masters	(United Kingdom) Great Britain	Frimley Green, Surrey	Lakeside	1995		(England) Mike Gregory	
International Darts League (former Major)	Netherlands	Nijmegen	Triavium	2003–2007	128	(Scotland) Gary Anderson	
Marlborough Masters	(United Kingdom) Great Britain			1974–?	32	(Wales) David Jones	
New South Wales Open	Australia			2014–?	32	(Australia) Eddy Sims	
Tops of Ghent	Belgium			2011–2014	32	(England) Scott Mitchell	
Van Diemen Classic	Belgium			2014–?	32	(Australia) Peter Machin	
Finder Darts Masters (former Major)	Netherlands	Egmond aan Zee	Zuiderduin Hotel	1995-2018	32	(England) Glen Durrant	€33,500
World Darts Trophy (former Major)	Netherlands	Utrecht	Vechtsebanen	2002–2007	128	(Scotland) Gary Anderson	
MFI World Matchplay (former Major)	(United Kingdom) Great Britain	Basildon	Festival Hall	1984–1988	128	(England) Eric Bristow	
Wales Classic	Wales	Host location	Host venue	2004–2013	128	(England) James Wilson	
Wales Masters	Wales	Host location	Host venue	2006–2010	128	(England) Tony West	
Hal Open	Netherlands			2010-2017	64	(England) Mark McGeeney	€9,500
Hal Masters	Netherlands	Venray	Evenementenhal Venray	2015-2017	64	(Northern Ireland) Kyle McKinstry	€9,500
Jersey Classic	Jersey			2012-2017	128	(England) Dave Parletti	£5,000
Jersey Open	Jersey			2012-2017	64	(England) Scott Waites	£5,000
Muensterland Trophy	Germany	Gelsenkirchen	Forum Gesamtschule Berger Feld	2014-2015	32	(Netherlands) Ryan de Vreede	€8,300
Muensterland Classic	Germany	Gelsenkirchen	Forum Gesamtschule Berger Feld	2014-2015	32	(Netherlands) Fabian Roosenbrand	€8,300
