= 2014 Auckland Open (darts) =

Auckland Open

Tournament information
- Dates: 20 September 2014
- Location: Auckland
- Country: New Zealand
- Organisation(s): BDO, WDF, NZDC

Champion(s)
- (New Zealand) Cody Harris (New Zealand) Tina Osborne

2014 Auckland Open was a darts tournament that took place in Auckland, New Zealand on 20 September 2014.

== Results ==
=== Men ===
Final 16
(New Zealand)	Cody Harris
(New Zealand)	Wilson Henry
(New Zealand)	Brian Steed
(New Zealand)	Steve Gooch
(New Zealand)	Craig Caldwell
(New Zealand)	Mark Cleaver
(New Zealand)	Rob Szabo
(New Zealand)	Peter Hunt
(New Zealand)	Mike Day
(Philippines)	Anthony Benitez
(New Zealand)	Josh Roberts
(New Zealand)	Jason Ladbrook
(New Zealand)	Steve Padget
(New Zealand)	Frank Speights
(New Zealand)	Steve Davis
(Australia)	Mick Lacey

Quarter-finals
(New Zealand)	Cody Harris	4
(New Zealand)	Brian Steed	2
(New Zealand)	Craig Caldwell	4
(New Zealand)	Rob Szabo	2
(New Zealand)	Mike Day	4
(New Zealand)	Jason Ladbrook	2
(New Zealand)	Frank Speights
(Australia)	Mick Lacey

Semi-finals
(New Zealand)	Cody Harris	4
(New Zealand)	Craig Caldwell	2
(New Zealand)	Mike Day
(New Zealand)	Frank Speights

Final
(New Zealand)	Cody Harris	4
(New Zealand)	Mike Day	2

=== Women ===
Final 16
(New Zealand)	Tina Osborne
(New Zealand)	Paeru Ngatuakana
(New Zealand)	Colleen Curreen
(New Zealand)	Loretta Hunter
(New Zealand)	Lorraine Pike
(New Zealand)	Stacey Heavey
(New Zealand)	Yvonne Williams
(New Zealand)	Janette Jonathan
(New Zealand)	Sha Hohipa
(New Zealand)	Ngapine Heke
(New Zealand)	Rita Wells
(New Zealand)	Peggy Wikaira
(New Zealand)	Jo Steed
(New Zealand)	Carol Matthews
(New Zealand)	Kathryn Manu
(New Zealand)	Rachel Padget

Quarter-finals
(New Zealand)	Tina Osborne	3
(New Zealand)	Loretta Hunter	0
(New Zealand)	Lorraine Pike	1
(New Zealand)	Janette Jonathan	3
(New Zealand)	Sha Hohipa	3
(New Zealand)	Rita Wells	1
(New Zealand)	Jo Steed	3
(New Zealand)	Kathryn Manu	1

Semi-finals
(New Zealand)	Tina Osborne	4
(New Zealand)	Janette Jonathan	1
(New Zealand)	Sha Hohipa	4
(New Zealand)	Jo Steed	3

Final
(New Zealand)	Tina Osborne	5
(New Zealand)	Sha Hohipa	3
