= Super League Darts =

The SKYCITY Super League Darts was a darts tournament featuring New Zealand's top eight darts players. The event was held at the SKYCITY Convention Centre in Auckland, New Zealand, for four nights over July and August. This was the second year of the Tournament and the first that SKYCITY had been the naming rights sponsor. The final was the first live televised darts tournament ever in New Zealand when it ran on Saturday 1 August. Craig Caldwell defeated Warren Parry in the final and took home the championship.

== Players ==
The 2015 players were announced in a press release on May 19, 2015. The players were selected as the top four off the New Zealand rankings and four wildcards, as selected by the Tournament promoters.

Player	Year of Debut	Qualification
Rob Szabo	2014	Order of merit
Mark McGrath	2014	Wild Card
Cody Harris	2014	Order of merit
Warren Parry	2015	Order of merit
Jonathan Silcock	2014	Wild Card
Craig Caldwell	2014	Wild Card
Peter Hunt	2014	Wild Card
Mick Lacey	2015	Order of merit
Greg Moss	2014	Wild Card
Mike Day	2014	Wild Card

== Dates ==
SKYCITY Super League Darts took place over four nights in July and August.

All nights were held at the SKYCITY Convention Centre in Auckland, New Zealand.

- Night One - Friday 10 July
- Night Two - Friday 17 July
- Night Three - Saturday 18 July
- Finals - Saturday 1 August

== Tournament Format ==
The draw is set to be formally announced by the tournament promoters. The first three nights will see the players split into two seeded pools of four players. Each player will play the others in their pool once over the first three nights with the top four qualifying for the knockout stage on the final night.

Pool play

In pool play, players will earn three points for each win, one bonus point if they hit three 180's and zero points for a loss. The players with the most points in each pool will qualify for the knock-out stage on the final night.

The tournament sees the introduction of a bonus point, unseen in any other dart competition around the world. In pool play, if the players hit three 180's in a match they earn a bonus point.

Knock-out stage

The finals will be held on Saturday, 1 August. The top two qualifiers from each pool will meet the other qualifiers.

Semi final One: First in Pool A v Second in Pool B Semi final Two: First in Pool B v Second in Pool A

Final: Winner of SF1 v Winner of SF2

Leg length

All matches will be PDC format 501 with a straight start. Leg lengths are as follows:

Tournament stage	Leg length
Pool play	13
Semi Finals	13
Final	17
