= 2013 Auckland Open (darts) =

Auckland Open

Tournament information
- Dates: 21 September 2013
- Location: Auckland
- Country: New Zealand
- Organisation(s): BDO, WDF, NZDC

Champion(s)
- (New Zealand) Cody Harris (New Zealand) Kit Bennett

2013 Auckland Open was a darts tournament that took place in Auckland, New Zealand on 21 September 2013.

== Results ==
=== Men ===
Final 16
(New Zealand)	Cody Harris
(New Zealand)	Paul Earl
(New Zealand)	Tony Lee
(New Zealand)	Jamie Smith
(New Zealand)	Craig Caldwell
(New Zealand)	William Peters
(New Zealand)	Willie Hopokingi
(New Zealand)	Bill Fergus
(New Zealand)	'Rodney Moreland
(New Zealand)	Tony Carmichael
(New Zealand)	John Kelly
(New Zealand)	Peter Carmichael
(New Zealand)	John Sinclair
(New Zealand)	Mike Day
(New Zealand)	Jason Ladbrook
(New Zealand)	Frank Speight

Quarter-finals
(New Zealand)	Cody Harris
(New Zealand)	Tony Lee
(New Zealand)	Craig Caldwell
(New Zealand)	Willie Hopokingi
(New Zealand)	Rodney Moreland
(New Zealand)	John Kelly
(New Zealand)	John Sinclair
(New Zealand)	Jason Ladbrook

Semi-finals
(New Zealand)	Cody Harris	4
(New Zealand)	Craig Caldwell	3
(New Zealand)	Rodney Moreland	4
(New Zealand)	John Sinclair	2

Final
(New Zealand)	Cody Harris	5
(New Zealand)	Rodney Moreland	0

=== Women ===
Final 16
(New Zealand)	Rachel Padget
(New Zealand)	Lorraine Pike
(New Zealand)	Tauturu John
(New Zealand)	Stacey Heavey
(New Zealand)	Oliver Curreen
(New Zealand)	Dawn Unuka
(New Zealand)	Peggy Wikaira
(New Zealand)	Meta Reid
(New Zealand)	Kit Bennett
(New Zealand)	Jo Kinita
(New Zealand)	Gail Taylor
(New Zealand)	Tracy Puepuehi
(New Zealand)	Charlene Tepaki
(New Zealand)	Megan Smith
(New Zealand)	Sonia Lewis
(New Zealand)	Tina Osborne

Quarter-finals
(New Zealand)	Lorraine Pike
(New Zealand)	Tauturu John
(New Zealand)	Oliver Curreen
(New Zealand)	Peggy Wikaira
(New Zealand)	Kit Bennett
(New Zealand)	Gail Taylor
(New Zealand)	Megan Smith
(New Zealand)	Tina Osborne

Semi-finals
(New Zealand)	Lorraine Pike	4
(New Zealand)	Oliver Curreen	2
(New Zealand)	Kit Bennett	4
(New Zealand)	Tina Osborne	2

Final
(New Zealand)	Lorraine Pike	0
(New Zealand)	Kit Bennett	5
