= 2015 Auckland Open (darts) =

Auckland Open

Tournament information
- Dates: 19 September 2015
- Location: Auckland
- Country: New Zealand
- Organisation(s): BDO, WDF, NZDC

Champion(s)
- (New Zealand) Craig Caldwell (New Zealand) Jo Steed

2015 Auckland Open was a darts tournament that took place in Auckland, New Zealand on 19 September 2015.

== Results ==
=== Men ===
Final 16
(New Zealand)	Craig Caldwell
(New Zealand)	Shane Hori
(Australia)	Mick Lacey
(New Zealand)	Frank Speight
(New Zealand)	John Kelly
(New Zealand)	Sonny Harris
(New Zealand)	Aaron Cooper
(New Zealand)	Brian Steed
(New Zealand)	Mark Cleaver
(New Zealand)	Louis Kunz
(New Zealand)	Josh Roberts
(New Zealand)	Darren Herewini
(New Zealand)	Cody Harris
(New Zealand)	Cyndric Joyce
(New Zealand)	Steve Gooch
(New Zealand)	Lou Tai

Quarter-finals
(New Zealand)	Craig Caldwell
(Australia)	Mick Lacey
(New Zealand)	John Kelly
(New Zealand)	Aaron Cooper
(New Zealand)	Mark Cleaver
(New Zealand)	Josh Roberts
(New Zealand)	Cody Harris
(New Zealand)	Steve Gooch

Semi-finals
(New Zealand)	Craig Caldwell
(New Zealand)	John Kelly
(New Zealand)	Mark Cleaver
(New Zealand)	Cody Harris

Final
(New Zealand)	Craig Caldwell	5
(New Zealand)	Mark Cleaver	3

=== Women ===
Final 16
(New Zealand)	Judy Fenton
(New Zealand)	Piki Morrison
(New Zealand)	Desi Mercer
(New Zealand)	Jo Kinita
(New Zealand)	Jo Steed
(New Zealand)	Lorraine Pike
(New Zealand)	Kayleen Ngare
(New Zealand)	Colleen Curreen
(New Zealand)	Malia Ioane
(New Zealand)	Marilyn Waitere
(New Zealand)	Taylor-Marsh Kahaki
(New Zealand)	Verena Cleaver
(New Zealand)	Mata Tuao
(New Zealand)	Sha Hohipa

Quarter-finals
(New Zealand)	Tina Osborne
(New Zealand)	Judy Fenton
(New Zealand)	Desi Mercer
(New Zealand)	Jo Steed
(New Zealand)	Colleen Curreen
(New Zealand)	Malia Ioane
(New Zealand)	Verena Cleaver
(New Zealand)	Sha Hohipa

Semi-finals
(New Zealand)	Tina Osborne
(New Zealand)	Jo Steed
(New Zealand)	Malia Ioane
(New Zealand)	Sha Hohipa

Final
(New Zealand)	Jo Steed	5
(New Zealand)	Sha Hohipa	4
