= 2011 Auckland Open (darts) =

Auckland Open

Tournament information
- Dates: September 17th, 2011
- Location: Auckland
- Country: New Zealand
- Organisation(s): BDO, WDF, NZDC

Champion(s)
- (New Zealand) Jonathan Silcock (New Zealand) Jannette Jonathan

2011 Auckland Open was a darts tournament that took place in Auckland, New Zealand on 17 September 2011.

== Results ==
=== Men ===
Final 16
(New Zealand)	Koha Kokiri
(New Zealand)	Tom Williams
(New Zealand)	Brendon Deed
(New Zealand)	Tony Ngeru
(New Zealand)	Monty Tuhua
(New Zealand)	Cody Harris
(New Zealand)	Robbie Dick
(New Zealand)	Tukina Weko
(New Zealand)	Jonathan Silcock
(New Zealand)	Phil Archibald
(New Zealand)	Darren Kirk
(New Zealand)	Laurie Turner
(New Zealand)	Mike Day
(New Zealand)	Mark Cleaver
(New Zealand)	Lou Tai
(New Zealand)	Greg Moss

Quarter-finals
(New Zealand)	Tom Williams	0
(New Zealand)	Brendon Deed	3
(New Zealand)	Monty Tuhua	3
(New Zealand)	Tukina Weko	2
(New Zealand)	Jonathan Silcock	3
(New Zealand)	Laurie Turner	2
(New Zealand)	Mark Cleaver	3
(New Zealand)	Lou Tai	1

Semi-finals
(New Zealand)	Brendon Deed	2
(New Zealand)	Monty Tuhua	3
(New Zealand)	Jonathan Silcock	3
(New Zealand)	Mark Cleaver	1

Final
(New Zealand)	Monty Tuhua	3
(New Zealand)	Jonathan Silcock	4

=== Women ===
Final 16
(New Zealand)	Jannette Jonathan
(New Zealand)	Tautoru John
(New Zealand)	Charlene Te Paki
(New Zealand)	Malia Ioane
(New Zealand)	Anna Neho
(New Zealand)	Rogere Te Whero
(New Zealand)	Colleen Curreen
(New Zealand)	Peggy Wikaira
(New Zealand)	Lorene Earnshaw
(New Zealand)	Nga Smyth
(New Zealand)	Hazel Rameka
(New Zealand)	Helen Makiha
(New Zealand)	Selina Baker-Clemas
(New Zealand)	Rita Wells
(New Zealand)	Marion Morgan
(New Zealand)	Mihi Pike

Quarter-finals
(New Zealand)	Jannette Jonathan
(New Zealand)	Charlene Te Paki
(New Zealand)	Rogere Te Whero
(New Zealand)	Peggy Wikaira
(New Zealand)	Lorene Earnshaw
(New Zealand)	Hazel Rameka
(New Zealand)	Selina Baker-Clemas
(New Zealand)	Marion Morgan

Semi-finals
(New Zealand)	Jannette Jonathan	3
(New Zealand)	Rogere Te Whero	1
(New Zealand)	Lorene Earnshaw	2
(New Zealand)	Selina Baker-Clemas	3

Final
(New Zealand)	Jannette Jonathan	4
(New Zealand)	Selina Baker-Clemas	3
