= 2010 Auckland Open (darts) =

Auckland Open

Tournament information
- Dates: 18 September 2010
- Location: Auckland
- Country: New Zealand
- Organisation(s): BDO, WDF, NZDC

Champion(s)
- (New Zealand) Cyndric Joyce (New Zealand) Jannette Jonathan

2010 Auckland Open was a darts tournament that took place in Auckland, New Zealand on 18 September 2010.

== Results ==
=== Men ===
Final 16
(New Zealand)	Peter Hunt
(New Zealand)	Jai Monaghan
(New Zealand)	Cyndric Joyce
(New Zealand)	Brian Steed
(New Zealand)	Peter Herewini
(New Zealand)	Mike Day
(New Zealand)	Steve Gooch
(New Zealand)	Koha Kokiri
(New Zealand)	Bill Fergus
(New Zealand)	Darren Herewini
(New Zealand)	Sonny Harris
(New Zealand)	Richard Te Whero
(New Zealand)	Tony Lee
(New Zealand)	Rob Szabo
(New Zealand)	Wilson Henry
(New Zealand)	Monty Tuhua

Quarter-finals
(New Zealand)	Jai Monaghan	1
(New Zealand)	Cyndric Joyce	3
(New Zealand)	Peter Herewini	3
(New Zealand)	Koha Kokiri	1
(New Zealand)	Darren Herewini	2
(New Zealand)	Richard Te Whero	3
(New Zealand)	Rob Szabo	3
(New Zealand)	Monty Tuhua	0

Semi-finals
(New Zealand)	Cyndric Joyce	3
(New Zealand)	Peter Herewini	2
(New Zealand)	Richard Te Whero	3
(New Zealand)	Rob Szabo	2

Final
(New Zealand)	Cyndric Joyce	4
(New Zealand)	Richard Te Whero	2

=== Women ===
Final 16
(New Zealand)	Jannette Jonathan
(New Zealand)	Jo Kinita
(New Zealand)	Rogere Te Whero
(New Zealand)	Denise Walker
(New Zealand)	Effie Bennett
(New Zealand)	Jo Steed
(New Zealand)	Vernaleigh Brinsdon
(New Zealand)	Peggy Wikaira
(New Zealand)	Gail Taylor
(New Zealand)	Anna Neho
(New Zealand)	Maria Siavale
(New Zealand)	Janet Johnson
(New Zealand)	Malia Ioane
(New Zealand)	Lou Williams
(New Zealand)	Sandra Melgers
(New Zealand)	Mihi Pike

Quarter-finals
(New Zealand)	Jannette Jonathan	3
(New Zealand)	Rogere Te Whero	2
(New Zealand)	Jo Steed	2
(New Zealand)	Peggy Wikaira	3
(New Zealand)	Anna Neho	3
(New Zealand)	Maria Siavale	1
(New Zealand)	Malia Ioane	3
(New Zealand)	Mihi Pike	1

Semi-finals
(New Zealand)	Jannette Jonathan	3
(New Zealand)	Peggy Wikaira	1
(New Zealand)	Anna Neho	2
(New Zealand)	Malia Ioane	3

Final
(New Zealand)	Jannette Jonathan	4
(New Zealand)	Malia Ioane	0
