= 2012 Auckland Open (darts) =

Auckland Open

Tournament information
- Dates: 22 September 2012
- Location: Auckland
- Country: New Zealand
- Organisation(s): BDO, WDF, NZDC

Champion(s)
- (New Zealand) Cody Harris (New Zealand) Polly Luke

2012 Auckland Open was a darts tournament that took place in Auckland, New Zealand on 22 September 2012.

== Results ==
=== Men ===
Final 16
(New Zealand)	Peter Hunt
(New Zealand)	John Hereora
(New Zealand)	Deon Toki
(New Zealand)	Bill Fergus
(New Zealand)	Laurie Turner
(New Zealand)	Sam Bryant
(New Zealand)	John Kelly
(New Zealand)	Paul Earl
(New Zealand)	Cody Harris
(New Zealand)	Steve Gooch
(New Zealand)	Frank Speight
(New Zealand)	Rodney Moreland
(New Zealand)	Jai Monaghan
(New Zealand)	Peter Page
(New Zealand)	Shaun Duval
(New Zealand)	Craig Caldwell

Quarter-finals
(New Zealand)	Peter Hunt
(New Zealand)	Bill Fergus
(New Zealand)	Sam Bryant
(New Zealand)	Paul Earl
(New Zealand)	Cody Harris
(New Zealand)	Rodney Moreland
(New Zealand)	Peter Page
(New Zealand)	Craig Caldwell

Semi-finals
(New Zealand)	Peter Hunt
(New Zealand)	Sam Bryant
(New Zealand)	Cody Harris
(New Zealand)	Craig Caldwell

Final
(New Zealand)	Sam Bryant	1
(New Zealand)	Cody Harris	6

=== Women ===
Final 16
(New Zealand)	Jannette Jonathan
(New Zealand)	Charlene Te Paki
(New Zealand)	Gayle Hapurona
(New Zealand)	Lorraine Pike
(New Zealand)	Peggy Wikaira
(New Zealand)	Sonia Lewis
(New Zealand)	Verena Cleaver
(New Zealand)	Ripeka Te Moananui
(New Zealand)	Anna Neho
(New Zealand)	Malia Ioane
(New Zealand)	Nga Smyth
(New Zealand)	Polly Luke
(New Zealand)	Kit Bennett
(New Zealand)	Jo Kinita
(New Zealand)	S'Vania Te Moananui
(New Zealand)	Lorene Gilliam

Quarter-finals
(New Zealand)	Jannette Jonathan
(New Zealand)	Lorraine Pike
(New Zealand)	Sonia Lewis
(New Zealand)	Ripeka Te Moananui
(New Zealand)	Anna Neho
(New Zealand)	Polly Luke
(New Zealand)	Jo Kinita
(New Zealand)	Lorene Gilliam

Semi-finals
(New Zealand)	Jannette Jonathan
(New Zealand)	Sonia Lewis
(New Zealand)	Polly Luke
(New Zealand)	Jo Kinita

Final
(New Zealand)	Jannette Jonathan	4
(New Zealand)	Polly Luke	5
