= New Zealand Masters =

Tournament information
- Venue: Kapi Mana Darts Association Clubrooms
- Location: Porirua
- Country: New Zealand
- Established: 1992
- Organisation(s): NZDC, WDF, category 3 BDO, category D
- Format: Legs
- Prize fund: NZD 5,060
- Month(s) Played: June

Current champion(s)
- (New Zealand) Ben Robb (Men's) (New Zealand) Nicole Regnaud (Women's)

The New Zealand Masters is a darts tournament that has been held annually since 1992.

== List of winners ==
=== Men's ===
Year	Champion (average in final)	Score	Runner-up (average in final)	Total Prize Money	Champion	Runner-up
1992	(New Zealand) Steve Turdeich	?–?	(Scotland) Murray Smith			
1993	(New Zealand) Peter Hunt	?–?	(New Zealand) Warren Parry			
1994	(Scotland) Murray Smith	?–?	(New Zealand) Barry Whittaker			
1995	(New Zealand) John Sinclair	?–?	(New Zealand) Mark McGrath			
1996	(New Zealand) Barry Whittaker	?–?	(New Zealand) Phillip Hazel			
1997	(New Zealand) Peter Hunt (2)	?–?	(New Zealand) Barry Whittaker			
1998	(New Zealand) Peter Hunt (3)	?–?	(New Zealand) Barry Whittaker			
1999	(New Zealand) Peter Hunt (4)	?–?	(New Zealand) Barry Whittaker			
2000	(New Zealand) Neville Moss	?–?	(New Zealand) Alan Thomson			
2001	(New Zealand) Preston Ridd	?–?	(Australia) Russell Stewart			
2002	(New Zealand) Peter Hunt (5)	?–?	(Australia) Russell Stewart			
2003	(New Zealand) Robert Green	?–?	(New Zealand) Wayne Casey			
2004	(New Zealand) Herbie Nathan	5–4	(New Zealand) Preston Ridd			
2005	(Australia) Simon Whitlock	5–3	(New Zealand) Bernie Smith	NZD 3,700	NZD 1,500	NZD 600
2006	(New Zealand) Craig Pullen	5–4	(New Zealand) Peter Hunt			
2007	(New Zealand) Warren Parry (87.93)	5–3	(New Zealand) Neville Moss (78.21)	NZD 3,700	NZD 1,500	NZD 600
2008	(New Zealand) Bernie Smith (78.60)	5–3	(New Zealand) Wayne Carey (72.42)	NZD 3,700	NZD 1,500	NZD 600
2009	(New Zealand) Peter Hunt (96.36) (6)	5–0	(New Zealand) Greg Moss (85.41)	NZD 3,700	NZD 1,500	NZD 600
2010	(New Zealand) Peter Hunt (7)	5–3	(New Zealand) Bernie Smith			
2011	(New Zealand) Craig Caldwell	6–5	(New Zealand) Koha Kokiri			
2012	(New Zealand) Greg Moss	6–3	(New Zealand) Wayne Carey			
2013	(New Zealand) Greg Moss (2)	6–3	(New Zealand) Jason Ladbrook			
2014	(New Zealand) Tony Carmichael	5–4	(New Zealand) Craig Pullen			
2015	(New Zealand) Peter Hunt (8)	5–4	(New Zealand) Greg Moss			
2016	(New Zealand) Mark McGrath	6–2	(New Zealand) Mark Cleaver			
2017	(New Zealand) Cody Harris	6–5	(New Zealand) Tahuna Irwin			
2018	(New Zealand) Cody Harris (2)	6–1	(New Zealand) Darren Herewini	NZD 3,400	NZD 1,250	NZD 650
2019	(New Zealand) Tahuna Irwin	6–2	(New Zealand) Jonathan Silcock	NZD 3,400	NZD 1,250	NZD 650
2021	(New Zealand) Warren Parry (2)	6 – 5	(New Zealand) Mark Cleaver	NZD 3,400	NZD 1,250	NZD 650
2022	(New Zealand) Haupai Puha	6 – 5	(New Zealand) Mark Cleaver	NZD 3,400	NZD 1,250	NZD 650
2023	Ben Robb	6 – 1	Haupai Puha	NZD 5,300	NZD 1,400	NZD 700
2024	(New Zealand) Mark Cleaver	6 – 4	(New Zealand) Jonny Tata	NZD 5,300	NZD 1,400	NZD 700

=== Women's ===
Year	Champion (average in final)	Score	Runner-up (average in final)	Total Prize Money	Champion	Runner-up
2004	(New Zealand) Megan Smith	5–2	(New Zealand) Carol Forward			
2005	(New Zealand) Jannette Jonathan	5–1	(New Zealand) Carol Forward			
2006	(New Zealand) Carol Forward	5–1	(New Zealand) Jannette Jonathan			
2007	(New Zealand) Carol Forward (2)	5–4	(New Zealand) Jannette Jonathan			
2008	(Australia) Corrine Hammond	5–1	(New Zealand) Louise Ball			
2009	(New Zealand) Marion Morgan	5–4	(New Zealand) Meta Reid			
2010	(New Zealand) Carol Forward (3)	5–3	(New Zealand) Jannette Jonathan			
2011	(Australia) Corrine Hammond (2)	6–2	(New Zealand) Peggy Wikaira			
2012	(Australia) Corrine Hammond (3)	6–2	(New Zealand) Tara Mears			
2013	(New Zealand) Tina Osborne	5–2	(New Zealand) Kit Bennett			
2014	(New Zealand) Tina Osborne (2)	5–3	(New Zealand) Rachel Padget			
2015	(New Zealand) Sha Hohipa	5–3	(New Zealand) Tina Osborne			
2016	(New Zealand) Tina Osborne (3)	5–3	(New Zealand) Chris Hay			
2017	(New Zealand) Tina Osborne (4)	5–3	(New Zealand) Tara Mears			
2018	(New Zealand) Jo Steed	5 – 1	(New Zealand) Judy Fenton	NZD 1,660	NZD 600	NZD 300
2019	(New Zealand) Wendy Harper	5 – 3	Tori Kewish	NZD 1,660	NZD 600	NZD 300
2021	Nicole Regnaud	5 – 4	Wendy Harper	NZD 1,660	NZD 600	NZD 300
2022	Wendy Harper (2)	5 – 1	Nicole Regnaud	NZD 1,660	NZD 600	NZD 300
2023	Desi Mercer	5 – 1	Nicole Regnaud	NZD 2,250	NZD 700	NZD 350
2024	Nicole Regnaud (2)	5 – 0	Desi Mercer	NZD 2,250	NZD 700	NZD 350
