= 2009 Auckland Open (darts) =

Auckland Open

Tournament information
- Dates: 19 September 2009
- Location: Auckland
- Country: New Zealand
- Organisation(s): BDO, WDF, NZDC

Champion(s)
- (New Zealand) Richard Te Whero (New Zealand) Denisa Walker

2009 Auckland Open was a darts tournament that took place in Auckland, New Zealand on 19 September 2009.

== Results ==
=== Men ===
Final 16
(New Zealand)	Lou Tai
(New Zealand)	Mike Day
(New Zealand)	Wilson Henry
(New Zealand)	John Dodunski
(New Zealand)	Lucas Edwards
(New Zealand)	Bailey Matthews
(New Zealand)	Graham McElroy
(New Zealand)	Rob Szabo
(New Zealand)	Steve Gooch
(New Zealand)	Gareth Aitken
(New Zealand)	Whitu Taylor
(New Zealand)	Richard Te Whero
(New Zealand)	Adam Whitmore
(New Zealand)	John Sinclair
(New Zealand)	Cyndric Joyce
(New Zealand)	Chas Forster

Quarter-finals
(New Zealand)	Mike Day	3
(New Zealand)	Wilson Henry	1
(New Zealand)	Lucas Edwards	3
(New Zealand)	Rob Szabo	1
(New Zealand)	Steve Gooch	1
(New Zealand)	Richard Te Whero	3
(New Zealand)	John Sinclair	3
(New Zealand)	Chas Forster	1

Semi-finals
(New Zealand)	Mike Day	3
(New Zealand)	Lucas Edwards	0
(New Zealand)	Richard Te Whero	3
(New Zealand)	John Sinclair	2

Final
(New Zealand)	Mike Day	3
(New Zealand)	Richard Te Whero	4

=== Women ===
Final 16
(New Zealand)	Mihi Pike	0
(New Zealand)	Jo Kinita	3
(New Zealand)	Gerry MacDonald	1
(New Zealand)	Gail Taylor	3
(New Zealand)	Mana Kokiri	3
(New Zealand)	Lorene Earnshaw	2
(New Zealand)	Rogere Te Whero	3
(New Zealand)	Polly Luke	0
(New Zealand)	Bubs Sylva	3
(New Zealand)	Maria Siavale	2
(New Zealand)	Jo Steed	1
(New Zealand)	Girl Kahaki	3
(New Zealand)	Denisa Walker	3
(New Zealand)	Sandra Matthews	0
(New Zealand)	Nga Smyth	0
(New Zealand)	Peggy Wikaira	3

Quarter-finals
(New Zealand)	Jo Kinata	0
(New Zealand)	Gail Taylor	3
(New Zealand)	Mana Kokiri	3
(New Zealand)	Rogere Te Whero	2
(New Zealand)	Bubs Sylva	3
(New Zealand)	Girl Kahaki	1
(New Zealand)	Denisa Walker	3
(New Zealand)	Peggy Wikaira	0

Semi-finals
(New Zealand)	Gail Taylor	3
(New Zealand)	Mana Kokiri	2
(New Zealand)	Bubs Sylva	1
(New Zealand)	Denisa Walker	3

Final
(New Zealand)	Gail Taylor	2
(New Zealand)	Denisa Walker	4
