= Auckland Open =

The Auckland Open may refer to:

- WTA Auckland Open, women's tennis tournament
- ATP Auckland Open, men's tennis tournament
- Auckland Open (darts), annual darts tournament
