= 2008 Auckland Open (darts) =

Auckland Open

Tournament information
- Dates: 20 September 2008
- Location: Auckland
- Country: New Zealand
- Organisation(s): BDO, WDF, NZDC

Champion(s)
- (New Zealand) Craig Caldwell (New Zealand) Lorene Earnshaw

2008 Auckland Open was a darts tournament that took place in Auckland, New Zealand on 20 September 2008.

== Results ==
=== Men ===
Final 16
(New Zealand)	John Dodunski	2
(New Zealand)	Lou Tai	3
(New Zealand)	Toko Hazel	1
(New Zealand)	Errol Wilson	3
(New Zealand)	John Sinclair	3
(New Zealand)	Paul Stevenson	0
(New Zealand)	Graham McElroy	1
(New Zealand)	Koha Kokiri	3
(New Zealand)	Ru Teinaki	3
(New Zealand)	Dean Webster	0
(New Zealand)	Dinx Cassidy	0
(New Zealand)	Richard Te Whero	3
(New Zealand)	Craig Caldwell	3
(New Zealand)	Dave Bocking
(New Zealand)	Poe Teinaki	0
(New Zealand)	Robbie Dick	3

Quarter-finals
(New Zealand)	Lou Tai	3
(New Zealand)	Errol Wilson	0
(New Zealand)	John Sinclair	3
(New Zealand)	Koha Kokiri	0
(New Zealand)	Ru Teinaki	1
(New Zealand)	Richard Te Whero	3
(New Zealand)	Craig Caldwell	3
(New Zealand)	Robbie Dick	0

Semi-finals
(New Zealand)	Lou Tai (74.22)	3
(New Zealand)	John Sinclair (74.94)	2
(New Zealand)	Richard Te Whero (79.68)	2
(New Zealand)	Craig Caldwell (89.85)	3

Final
(New Zealand)	Lou Tai (71.10)	3
(New Zealand)	Craig Caldwell (75.90)	4

=== Women ===
Final 16
(New Zealand)	Mihi George
(New Zealand)	Lorna Tinei
(New Zealand)	Nunu Harris
(New Zealand)	Lou Williams
(New Zealand)	Rogere Te Whero
(New Zealand)	Joanne Kinita
(New Zealand)	Martha Ka
(New Zealand)	Polly Luke
(New Zealand)	Jannette Jonathan
(New Zealand)	Bev Teinaki
(New Zealand)	Donna McElroy
(New Zealand)	Lorene Earnshaw
(New Zealand)	Girl Kahaki
(New Zealand)	Cindi Watene
(New Zealand)	Gail Taylor
(New Zealand)	Peggy Wikaira

Quarter-finals
(New Zealand)	Mihi George	3
(New Zealand)	Nunu Harris	1
(New Zealand)	Rogere Te Whero	3
(New Zealand)	Polly Luke	2
(New Zealand)	Jannette Jonathan	1
(New Zealand)	Lorene Earnshaw	3
(New Zealand)	Girl Kahaki	3
(New Zealand)	Gail Taylor	2

Semi-finals
(New Zealand)	Mihi George (60.33)	2
(New Zealand)	Rogere Te Whero (60.15)	3
(New Zealand)	Lorene Earnshaw (51.24)	3
(New Zealand)	Girl Kahaki (48.99)	0

Final
(New Zealand)	Rogere Te Whero (58.17)	3
(New Zealand)	Lorene Earnshaw (57.39)	4
