= 2006 Auckland Open (darts) =

Auckland Open

Tournament information
- Dates: 2006
- Location: Auckland
- Country: New Zealand
- Organisation(s): BDO, WDF, NZDC

Champion(s)
- (New Zealand) Herbie Nathan (New Zealand) Peggy Speir

2006 Auckland Open was a darts tournament that took place in Auckland, New Zealand, in 2006.

== Results ==
=== Men ===
Final 16
(New Zealand)	John Dodunski	3
(New Zealand)	John Hereora	0
(New Zealand)	Neil Walker	3
(New Zealand)	William Peters	0
(New Zealand)	Sonny Davis	1
(New Zealand)	Kenneth Hereora	3
(New Zealand)	Herbie Nathan	3
(New Zealand)	Barry Kapa	0
(New Zealand)	Monty Tuhua	0
(New Zealand)	John Sinclair	3
(New Zealand)	Wilson Henry	3
(New Zealand)	Ron Glavish	2
(New Zealand)	Whitu Taylor	0
(New Zealand)	Cyndric Joyce	3
(New Zealand)	Richard Te Whero	2
(New Zealand)	Paul Harper	3

Quarter-finals
(New Zealand)	John Dodunski	1
(New Zealand)	Neil Walker	3
(New Zealand)	Kenneth Hereora	0
(New Zealand)	Herbie Nathan	3
(New Zealand)	John Sinclair	3
(New Zealand)	Wilson Henry	1
(New Zealand)	Cyndric Joyce	3
(New Zealand)	Paul Harper	0

Semi-finals
(New Zealand)	Neil Walker	0
(New Zealand)	Herbie Nathan	3
(New Zealand)	John Sinclair	3
(New Zealand)	Cyndric Joyce	0

Final
(New Zealand)	Herbie Nathan	4
(New Zealand)	John Sinclair	3

=== Women ===
Final 16
(New Zealand)	Denise Walker
(New Zealand)	Ngaki Kahu
(New Zealand)	Mayreen Tai
(New Zealand)	Valona Hereora
(New Zealand)	Mata Tetauru
(New Zealand)	Rogere Te Whero
(New Zealand)	Peggy Speir
(New Zealand)	Lindy McDermott
(New Zealand)	Lorna Tinei
(New Zealand)	Maria Johnson
(New Zealand)	Carol Harper
(New Zealand)	Gail Taylor

Quarter-finals
(New Zealand)	Piki Morrison	3
(New Zealand)	Denise Walker	2
(New Zealand)	Valona Hereora	3
(New Zealand)	Mata Tetauru	2
(New Zealand)	Peggy Speir	3
(New Zealand)	Maria Johnson	0
(New Zealand)	Gail Taylor	0
(New Zealand)	Marion Morgan	3

Semi-finals
(New Zealand)	Piki Morrison	2
(New Zealand)	Valona Hereora	3
(New Zealand)	Peggy Speir	3
(New Zealand)	Marion Morgan	1

Final
(New Zealand)	Valona Hereora	2
(New Zealand)	Peggy Speir	4
