= 2007 Auckland Open (darts) =

Auckland Open

Tournament information
- Dates: 22 September 2007
- Location: Auckland
- Country: New Zealand
- Organisation(s): BDO, WDF, NZDC

Champion(s)
- (New Zealand) Graeme McElroy (New Zealand) Mata Tetauru

2007 Auckland Open was a darts tournament that took place in Auckland, New Zealand on 22 September 2007.

== Results ==
=== Men ===
Final 16
(New Zealand)	John Dodunski	3
(New Zealand)	Jamie Smith	2
(New Zealand)	Lou Tai	3
(New Zealand)	Chris Robson	0
(New Zealand)	Cyril Larsen	3
(New Zealand)	Richard Te Whero	1
(New Zealand)	Neil Walker	2
(New Zealand)	Graeme McElroy	3
(New Zealand)	John Sinclair	1
(New Zealand)	Shaun Beardall	3
(New Zealand)	Wilson Henry	1
(New Zealand)	Paul Visschers	3
(New Zealand)	Dennis Fraser	3
(New Zealand)	Whitu Taylor	1
(New Zealand)	George Reti	1
(New Zealand)	Ron Glavish	3

Quarter-finals
(New Zealand)	John Dodunski	3
(New Zealand)	Lou Tai	1
(New Zealand)	Cyril Larsen	2
(New Zealand)	Graeme McElroy	3
(New Zealand)	Shaun Beardall	1
(New Zealand)	Paul Visschers	3
(New Zealand)	Dennis Fraser	1
(New Zealand)	Ron Glavish	3

Semi-finals
(New Zealand)	John Dodunski	0
(New Zealand)	Graeme McElroy	3
(New Zealand)	Paul Visschers	3
(New Zealand)	Ron Glavish	0

Final
(New Zealand)	Graeme McElroy (88.41)	4
(New Zealand)	Paul Visschers (60.15)	0

=== Women ===
Final 16
(New Zealand)	Mata Tetauru	3
(New Zealand)	Denise Hakeangatoa	0
(New Zealand)	Rogere Te Whero	3
(New Zealand)	Ange Henry	0
(New Zealand)	Denise Walker	3
(New Zealand)	Piki Morrison	0
(New Zealand)	Mihi George	3
(New Zealand)	Donna Simpson	0
(New Zealand)	Raewyn Heavey	3
(New Zealand)	Lou Williams	1
(New Zealand)	Cynthia Clay	0
(New Zealand)	Peggy Speir	3

Quarter-finals
(New Zealand)	Jannette Jonathan	1
(New Zealand)	Mata Tetauru	3
(New Zealand)	Rogere Te Whero	2
(New Zealand)	Denise Walker	3
(New Zealand)	Mihi George	3
(New Zealand)	Raewyn Heavey	0
(New Zealand)	Peggy Speir	1
(New Zealand)	Megan Smith	3

Semi-finals
(New Zealand)	Mata Tetauru	3
(New Zealand)	Denise Walker	0
(New Zealand)	Mihi George	1
(New Zealand)	Megan Smith	3

Final
(New Zealand)	Mata Tetauru (62.85)	4
(New Zealand)	Megan Smith (57.21)	1
