= Bob Jones Memorial =

Tournament information
- Venue: Astra Lounge, CFB Trenton
- Location: Trenton, Ontario
- Country: Canada
- Established: 2003
- Organisation(s): NDFC / BDO, category D / WDF category 2
- Format: Legs
- Prize fund: C$3,505
- Month(s) Played: late October

Current champion(s)
- (Canada) David Cameron (men's) (Canada) Maria Mason (women's)

The Bob Jones Memorial is a darts tournament that has been held since 2003.

== List of winners ==
=== Men's ===
| Year | Champion | Score | Runner-up | Total Prize Money | Champion | Runner-up |
|---|---|---|---|---|---|---|
| 2003 | (Canada) Rory Orvis | bt | (United States) Ricky Villanueva | | | |
| 2004 | (Canada) Gerry Convery | bt | (United States) Brad Wethington | | | |
| 2005 | (Canada) John Part | bt | (Canada) Gordon Mills | | | |
| 2006 | (Canada) Jerry Hull | bt | (Canada) Martin Tremblay | | | |
| 2007 | (Canada) Martin Tremblay | bt | (Canada) Andre Carman | | | |
| 2008 | (Canada) Chris Scutt | bt | (Canada) Andre Carman | | | |
| 2009 | (Canada) Chris Scutt | bt | (Canada) Andre Carman | C$1,920 | C$640 | C$320 |
| 2010 | (Canada) Jerry Hull | bt | (Canada) Dan Olson | C$1,920 | C$640 | C$320 |
| 2011 | (Canada) Guy Connelly | bt | (Canada) Jamie Kinslow | C$1,920 | C$640 | C$320 |
| 2012 | (Canada) Ross Snook | bt | (Canada) Paul Bolduc | C$1,920 | C$640 | C$320 |
| 2013 | (Canada) Ross Snook | bt | (United States) Darin Young | C$1,920 | C$640 | C$320 |
| 2014 | (Canada) Steve Warnock | bt | (Canada) Kiley Edmunds | C$1,920 | C$640 | C$320 |
| 2015 | (Canada) Dave Cameron | bt | (Canada) Dawson Murschell | C$1,920 | C$640 | C$320 |
| 2016 | (Canada) Jeff Smith | bt | (Canada) Dave Cameron | C$1,980 | C$640 | C$320 |
| 2017 | (Canada) Shawn Clohecy | bt | (Canada) Adam Stella | | | |
| 2018 | (Canada) David Cameron | bt | (Canada) Bruce Hulme | C$2,120 | C$700 | C$350 |

=== Women's ===
| Year | Champion | Score | Runner-up | Total Prize Money | Champion | Runner-up |
|---|---|---|---|---|---|---|
| 2009 | (Canada) Robin Curry | bt | (Canada) Kim Whaley-Hilts | | | |
| 2010 | (Canada) Robin Curry | bt | (Canada) Trish Grzesik | | | |
| 2011 | (Canada) Debralee Roberts | bt | (Canada) Darlene MacLeod | | | |
| 2012 | (United States) Cali West | bt | (Canada) Cindy Veith | | | |
| 2013 | (Canada) Cindy Hayhurst | bt | (Canada) Trish Grzesik | | | |
| 2014 | (Canada) Maria Mason | bt | (Canada) Trish Grzesik | | | |
| 2015 | (Canada) Roxanne Van Tassel | bt | (Canada) Christine Artibello | | | |
| 2016 | (Canada) Trish Grzesik | bt | (Canada) Tracy Boss | | | |
| 2017 | (Canada) Bailey Watson | bt | (Canada) Sal Walsh | | | |
| 2018 | (Canada) Maria Mason | bt | (Canada) Cheryl Heffernan | C$1,385 | C$450 | C$225 |

== Tournament records ==
- Most wins 2: . (Canada) Dave Cameron, Ross Snook
- Most Finals 3: (Canada) Dave Cameron.
- Most Semi Finals 3: (Canada) Dave Cameron, Ross Snook
- Most Quarter Finals 3: (Canada) Ross Snook, (Canada) Dave Cameron, (Canada) Terry Hayhurst, (Canada) Andre Carman, (Canada) Guy Connelly
- Most Appearances 5: (Canada) Dan Olson, (Canada) Jayson Barlow, (Canada) Martin Tremblay
- Most Prize Money won C$ C$2,120 : (Canada) Dave Cameron.
- Best winning average (.) :
- Youngest Winner age :
- Oldest Winner age :

== See also ==
- List of BDO ranked tournaments
- List of WDF tournaments
