= Iceland Open =

Tournament information
- Venue: Bullseye Darts
- Location: Reykjavík
- Country: Iceland
- Established: 2015
- Organisation(s): WDF
- Format: Legs

Current champion(s)
- Jan McIntosh (men's); Maud Jansson (women's)

The Iceland Open is an annual darts tournament on the WDF circuit that began in 2015.

== List of winners ==
=== Men's ===
Year	Champion	Av.	Score	Runner-Up	Av.	Prize Money			Venue
Year	Champion	Av.	Score	Runner-Up	Av.	Total	Ch.	R.-Up	Venue
2015	(Netherlands) Barry Zander	n/a	beat	(Scotland) Dennis Watt	n/a	n/a	n/a	n/a	Reykjavík Dartclub, Reykjavík
2016	(Sweden) Goran Eriksson	n/a	beat	(Scotland) Dennis Watt	n/a	n/a	ISK 50,000	ISK 25,000	Selfoss Hotel, Selfoss
2017	(Sweden) Peter Sajwani	n/a	beat	(Sweden) Dennis Nilsson	n/a	n/a	ISK 50,000	ISK 25,000	Reykjanesbaer, Keflavík
2018	(Scotland) Dennis Watt	n/a	7 – 5	(Iceland) Guðjón Hauksson	n/a	n/a	ISK 50,000	ISK 25,000	Hlégardur, Mosfellsbae
2019	(Scotland) Dennis Watt (2)	68.60	7 – 1	(Iceland) Alex-Máni Pétursson	59.70	ISK 140,000	ISK 60,000	ISK 30,000	Hlégardur, Mosfellsbae
2022	Gábor Takács	67.19	7 – 5	(Iceland) Guðjón Hauksson	66.21	ISK 140,000	ISK 60,000	ISK 30,000	Bullseye Darts, Reykjavík
2023	Edwin Torbjörnsson	93.17	5 – 3	Mark Barilli	83.55	ISK 140,000	ISK 60,000	ISK 30,000	Bullseye Darts, Reykjavík
2024	Jan McIntosh	84.79	5 – 2	Edwin Torbjörnsson	79.70	ISK 140,000	ISK 60,000	ISK 30,000	Bullseye Darts, Reykjavík
2025	(Iceland) Hordur Gudjonsson	76.90	7 - 6	(Iceland) Alexander Þorvaldsson	80.65	ISK 182,000	ISK 60,000	ISK 30,000	Bullseye Darts, Reykjavík

=== Women's ===
Year	Champion	Av.	Score	Runner-Up	Av.	Prize Money			Venue
Year	Champion	Av.	Score	Runner-Up	Av.	Total	Ch.	R.-Up	Venue
2015	(Iceland) Elinborg Steinunnardóttir	n/a	beat	(Iceland) Jóhanna Bergsdóttir	n/a	n/a	n/a	n/a	Reykjavík Dartclub, Reykjavík
2016	(Denmark) Elin Mortensen	n/a	beat	(Denmark) Hanne Johnson	n/a	n/a	n/a	n/a	Selfoss Hotel, Selfoss
2017	(Lithuania) Algina Juknaitė	n/a	beat	(Iceland) Ingibjörg Magnúsdóttir	n/a	n/a	n/a	n/a	Reykjanesbaer, Keflavík
2018	(Lithuania) Algina Juknaitė (2)	n/a	6 – 3	(Iceland) María Jóhannesdóttir	n/a	n/a	n/a	n/a	Hlégardur, Mosfellsbae
2019	(Iceland) Petrea Fridriksdottir	43.70	7 – 6	(Iceland) Ingibjörg Magnúsdóttir	45.00	ISK 80,000	ISK 40,000	ISK 20,000	Hlégardur, Mosfellsbae
2022	(Iceland) Ingibjörg Magnúsdóttir	54.35	7 – 2	(Iceland) Brynja Herborg Jónsdóttir	48.19	ISK 140,000	ISK 60,000	ISK 30,000	Bullseye Darts, Reykjavík
2023	(Germany) Anne Willkomm	68.29	5 – 4	(Sweden) Maud Jansson	62.54	ISK 140,000	ISK 60,000	ISK 30,000	Bullseye Darts, Reykjavík
2024	(Sweden) Maud Jansson	56.36	5 – 4	(Sweden) Milou Emriksdotter	54.01	ISK 140,000	ISK 60,000	ISK 30,000	Bullseye Darts, Reykjavík
2025	(Netherlands) Lerena Rietbergen	65.76	6 - 2	(Sweden) Maud Jansson	60.62	ISK 182,000	ISK 60,000	ISK 30,000	Bullseye Darts, Reykjavík
