= Tahuna Irwin =

New Zealand darts player

Personal information
- Full name: Tahuna Irwin
- Nickname: "The Beast"
- Born: 8 May 1997 (age 29) Gisborne, New Zealand

Sport
- Sport: Darts
- Playing since: 2013
- Darts: 24g Shot
- Laterality: Right-handed
- Walk-on music: "Adventure of a Lifetime" by Coldplay

Organisation (see split in darts)
- BDO: 2016–2017
- PDC: 2017–2025
- WDF: 2016–2025

Other tournament wins
- Years
New Zealand Open	2018
Medal record
Men's Darts
Representing New Zealand
WDF Asia-Pacific Cup
Silver medal – second place	2018 Seoul	Men's pairs
Bronze medal – third place	2018 Seoul	Team event

Tahuna Irwin (born 8 May 1997) is a New Zealand former professional darts player who has played in the Professional Darts Corporation (PDC) events.

== Darts career ==
Irwin qualified for the 2018 Auckland Darts Masters, where lost 6–3 to Peter Wright in the first round. A few days later, he won the New Zealand Open, defeating Deon Toki 6–4 in the final.

Irwin qualified for the 2019 PDC World Darts Championship by winning the DPNZ qualifier, defeating Craig Ross 7–2 in the final. He also qualified for the 2018 PDC World Youth Championship. However, due to an immigration error, he was unable to enter the United Kingdom for the Youth Championship, or subsequently, the World Championship.

Irwin Quit of the PDC in May 2021.

Irwin have playing events of the World Inclusio ParaDarts since 2026.

== World Championship results ==
=== PDC ===
- 2019: Withdrew
