= Rob Szabo =

New Zealand darts player

Personal information
- Full name: Robert Szabo
- Nickname: The Hurricane
- Born: 29 October 1965 (age 61) Wellington, New Zealand
- Home town: Wellington, New Zealand

Sport
- Sport: Darts
- Playing since: 1988
- Darts: 24 Gram Shot Signature
- Laterality: Right-handed
- Walk-on music: "Thunderstruck" by AC/DC

Organisation (see split in darts)
- PDC: 2013–2017

PDC premier events – best performances
- World Championship: Last 64: 2014, 2016

Other tournament wins
- Years
DPNZ Capital Open	2013
DPNZ Tararua Open	2015
Australian Grand Prix	2016
New Zealand Ch'ship	2010
PDC New Zealand Qualifier	2013, 2015
Medal record
Men's Darts
Representing New Zealand
WDF Asia-Pacific Cup
Bronze medal – third place	2010 Tokyo	Men's singles
Bronze medal – third place	2010 Tokyo	Team event

Robert Szabo (born 29 October 1965) is a former professional darts player from New Zealand.

== Career ==
Szabo claimed the 2010 New Zealand National Championship by beating Koha Kokiri 4–0 in the final.

He qualified for the 2014 PDC World Darts Championship after winning the New Zealand National Championship in July 2013. After beating England's Ian Moss 4–3 in the preliminary round he led Phil Taylor 1–0 in sets and 1–0 in legs before losing 3–1 in sets, in the first round. His performance received high praise from numerous darts pundits including Wayne Mardle, and from Taylor himself. In June, Szabo made his debut in the World Cup of Darts as he represented New Zealand with Craig Caldwell and they lost 5–3 to Spain in the first round. Szabo was defeated 6–1 by John Weber in the final of the Warilla Bowls Club Open and Weber was also the winner when the pair met in the final of the Oceanic Masters, this time triumphing 8–2.

Szabo won the 2015 DPNZ Tararua Open by beating Mark McGrath 7–5. He played with Warren Parry in the 2015 World Cup and they secured New Zealand's first win in the event since 2010 by knocking out Canada 5–4. They faced Northern Ireland in the second round with Szabo losing 4–1 to Brendan Dolan and Parry losing 4–0 to Michael Mansell to exit the tournament. He won the New Zealand qualifier for the 2016 World Championship by defeating Craig Caldwell 9–3. He overcame Michael Rasztovits 2–0 in the preliminary round, before losing 3–0 to Jamie Caven in the first round. His attempt to return to Alexandra Palace for the 2017 World Championship was ended in the final of the New Zealand Qualifying Event 7–3 by Parry. Szabo lost in the final of the DWA Grand Prix to Corey Cadby, but won the Harrows Australian GP by thrashing Damon Heta 6–0. At the 2017 World Cup, Szabo and Cody Harris were eliminated 5–2 by Belgium in the opening round.

== World Championship results ==
=== PDC ===
- 2014: First round (lost to Phil Taylor 1–3) (sets)
- 2016: First round (lost to Jamie Caven 0–3)

== Personal life ==
Szabo is a semi-pro darts player and earns a full-time living as a builder for Wellington construction company LT McGuiness.
