= Mark Cleaver =

New Zealand professional darts player

Personal information
- Nickname: "The Maestro"
- Born: 2 October 1967 (age 59) Taranaki, New Zealand
- Home town: Taranaki, New Zealand

Sport
- Sport: Darts
- Playing since: 2009
- Darts: 23g Cuesoul
- Laterality: Right-handed
- Walk-on music: "Rebel Yell" by Billy Idol

Organisation (see split in darts)
- PDC: 2012–
- WDF: 2021–
- Current world ranking: (WDF) 26 ▲69 (17 August 2026)

WDF major events – best performances
- World Masters: Last 272: 2016

Other tournament wins
- Years
Auckland Open	2016, 2018, 2022
New Zealand Masters	2024
Ted Clements Memorial	2018, 2024
DPNZ Pro Tour
DPNZ Pro Tour (Auckland)	2022
DPNZ Pro Tour (Christchurch)	2024
DPNZ Pro Tour (Hamilton)	2024 (2x)
DPNZ Pro Tour (Wellington)	2025 (2x)
Medal record
Men's Darts
Representing New Zealand
WDF Asia-Pacific Cup
Bronze medal – third place	2018 Seoul	Men's pairs
Bronze medal – third place	2018 Seoul	Team event

Mark Cleaver (born 2 October 1967) is a New Zealand professional darts player who plays in Professional Darts Corporation (PDC) events.

== Career ==
Cleaver started playing darts at the age of 10. His nickname, "the Maestro", comes from him playing guitar. He previously aimed to become a professional golfer but later switched back to darts.

Cleaver made his World Series of Darts debut in the 2015 Auckland Darts Masters losing to Peter Wright from Scotland. He then participated at 2017 Auckland Darts Masters, losing to James Wade of England, and then played at the 2018 Brisbane Darts Masters losing to Michael van Gerwen from Netherlands.
