= WDF Asia-Pacific Cup =

Tournament information
- Location: Seoul (2018)
- Country: South Korea
- Established: 1974
- Organisation(s): WDF

Current champion(s)
- Mitsuhiko Tatsunami (men's singles) (Hong Kong) Ho-Tung Ching & Yu-Kwong Tang (men's pairs); Yukie Sakaguchi (women's singles) (South Korea) A-Reum Kim & Yun-Ji Kim (women's pairs); Chinese Taipei (men's team); Japan (women's team); Mongolia (men's overall); Japan (women's overall)

The WDF Asia-Pacific Cup is a darts tournament held biennially since 1974. The tournament consists of a team championship, a pairs championship and a singles championship. All events have a men's competition, and a women's competition. The most recent Asia-Pacific Cup was held in 2024, in Taipei, Taiwan.

The tournament was originally known as the WDF Pacific Cup, but was renamed the Asia-Pacific Cup in 2000. It also initially featured teams from North America until the formation of the WDF Americas Cup in 2002.

== List of tournaments ==
Year	Host	Overall Champions	Men's Singles Champions	Men's Pairs Champions	Women's Singles Champions	Women's Pairs Champions	Team Event Champions	Mixed Pairs Champions	Ref
WDF Pacific Cup
1974; Details	(Australia); Melbourne	United States	(United States); Conrad Daniels	(Australia); Kevin White & George Foster	(Australia); Barbara Fletcher	(Australia); Barbara Fletcher; Cherry Bradshaw	(United States); Conrad Daniels; Cam Melchiorre; Judy Campbell; Jo-Ann Anderson	(New Zealand); Murray Smith; Lottie Chalcroft
1976; Details	(Australia); Perth	Australia	(Australia); Tim Brown	(United States); Conrad Daniels & Javier Gopar	(United States); Jo-Ann Anderson	(Australia); Ivy Hampton; Cherry Bradshaw	(Australia); Tim Brown; Barry Atkinson; Ivy Hampton; Cherry Bradshaw	(United States); Javier Gopar; Jo-Ann Anderson
1978; Details	(Australia); Sydney	New Zealand	(Australia); Barry Atkinson	(Australia); Barry Atkinson & Terry O'Dea	(Australia); Ivy Hampton	(Australia); Ivy Hampton & Barbara Fletcher	(Australia); Terry O'Dea; Barry Atkinson; Selly Tain; Barbara Fletcher	(Australia); Barry Atkinson & Cherry Bradshaw
1980; Details	(Australia); Newcastle, NSW	Australia	(Papua New Guinea); Paul Lim	(United States); Jerry Umberger & KC Mullaney	(Australia); Ivy Hampton	(Australia); Ivy Hampton & Cherry Bradshaw	(Papua New Guinea); Paul Lim; George Foster; Selly Tain; Carol Gerhardt	(Australia); Terry O'Dea & Barbara Fletcher
1982; Details	(Canada); Vancouver	Australia	(Australia); Terry O'Dea	(Australia); Terry O'Dea & Barry Atkinson	(Australia); Barbara Fletcher	(New Zealand); Lee-Ann Pickett & Angie Luscombe	(United States); Andy Green; Wade McDonald; Sandy Reitan; Judy Campbell	(Australia); Terry O'Dea & Barbara Fletcher
1984; Details	(United States); Honolulu, Hawaii	New Zealand	(Singapore); Paul Lim	(Canada); Bob Sinnaeve & Dave Green	(New Zealand); Lilian Barnett	(New Zealand); Lilian Barnett & Jane Karena	(United States); Jerry Umberger; Nicky Virachkul; Kathy Karpowich; Jo-Ann Anderson	(Canada); Bob Sinnaeve & Rani Gill
1986; Details	(New Zealand); Auckland	United States	(Singapore); Paul Lim	(New Zealand); Gordon Allpress & Barry Whittaker	(United States); Kathy Karpowich	(Canada); Rani Gill & Amy Earle	(United States); Tony Payne; Len Heard; Kathy Karpowich; Kathy Hopkins	(New Zealand); Gordon Allpress & Lottie Chalcroft
1988; Details	(Japan); Tokyo	Australia	(Australia); Russell Stewart	(Australia); Russell Stewart & Terry O'Dea	(Australia); Louise Ball	(United States); Lori Braithwaite & Kathy Hopkins	(United States); Paul Lim; Jim Damore; Lori Verrier; Kathy Hopkins	(Australia); Russell Stewart & Julie Thomas
1990; Details	Singapore	United States	(Canada); Albert Anstey	(Australia); Russell Stewart & Keith Sullivan	(New Zealand); Jane Karena	(Canada); Patricia Farrell & Carmen Pasher	(United States); Paul Lim; Dave Kelly; Eva Grigsby; Kim Kellar	(United States); Paul Lim & Eva Grigsby
1992; Details	(Australia); Melbourne	Australia	(Australia); Keith Sullivan	(Australia); Wayne Weening & Keith Sullivan	(Australia); Charmaine Barney	(United States); Sandy Reitan & Kathy Maloney	(New Zealand); Gordon Allpress; Peter Hunt; Jannette Jonathan; Sophie Corbett	(Australia); Keith Sullivan & Louise Ball
1994; Details	(Canada); Vancouver	Canada	(Australia); Russell Stewart	(Canada); John Part & Carl Mercer	(Canada); Patricia Farrell	(Canada); Patricia Farrell & Andrea Sorensen	(Australia); Russell Stewart; Wayne Atkins; Dot McLeod; Jodie Hislop	(Canada); John Part & Patricia Farrell
1996; Details	(Australia); Brisbane	Australia	(Australia); Graham Hunt	(Canada); Yves Chamberland & Carl Mercer	(Australia); Dot McLeod	(Australia); Dot McLeod & Megan Rodgers	(Canada); Yves Chamberland; Carl Mercer; Patricia Farrell; Leighton Johnson	(Australia); Graham Hunt & Dot McLeod
WDF Asia-Pacific Cup
2000; Details	(Philippines); Manila	New Zealand	(New Zealand); Warren Parry	(Malaysia); Hardip Singh & Tengku Hadzali Shah	(Japan); Yukari Nishikawa	(New Zealand); Jannette Jonathan & Marion Morgan	(New Zealand); Warren Parry; Herbie Nathan; Alan Thomson; Stuart Leach; Jannette Jonathan; Marion Morgan
2002; Details	(Thailand); Bangkok	New Zealand	(New Zealand); Herbie Nathan	(Australia); Graham Hunt & Anthony Fleet	(New Zealand); Jannette Jonathan	(Philippines); Janice Hinojales & Paulita Villanueva	(Philippines); Benedicto Ybanez; Celso Parfan III; Robert Calupit; Joseph Domanais; Paulita Villanueva; Janice Hinojales
2004; Details	Singapore	New Zealand	(New Zealand); Robert Grant	(Japan); Daisuke Takayama & Hiroshi Watanabe	(New Zealand); Megan Smith	(New Zealand); Jannette Jonathan & Megan Smith	(New Zealand); Warren Parry; Herbie Nathan; Robert Grant; Bernie Smith; Jannette Jonathan; Megan Smith
2006; Details	(Malaysia); Kuala Lumpur	New Zealand	(Malaysia); Amin Abdul Ghani	(Japan); Kouji Aoki & Taro Yachi	(New Zealand); Megan Smith	(New Zealand); Jannette Jonathan & Megan Smith	(Philippines); Lourence Ilagan; Ronald L. Briones; Roberto C. Concepcion; Rizal Barellano; Analiza Awitan; Roselyn Noble
2008; Details	(New Zealand); Palmerston North	Australia	(Australia); Peter Machin	(Malaysia); Selbaraju Subramaniam & Ananden Tandrian	(Australia); Corrine Hammond	(Australia); Corrine Hammond & Louise Ball	(Australia); Tony David; Kyle Anderson; Corrine Hammond; Eddy Sims; Louise Ball; Peter Machin
2010; Details	(Japan); Tokyo	Australia	(New Zealand); Koha Kokiri	(Australia); Anthony Fleet & Geoff Kime	(New Zealand); Jannette Jonathan	(Australia); Corrine Hammond & Lavinia Hogg	(Australia); Anthony Fleet; Beau Anderson; Corrine Hammond; Kyle Anderson; Lavinia Hogg; Geoff Kime
2018; Details	(South Korea); Seoul	Australia	(South Korea); Choi Min-seok	(Australia); Justin Thompson & Adam Rowe	(Japan); Mikuru Suzuki	(Australia); Tori Kewish & Leanne-Maree Wilson	(Japan); Mikuru Suzuki; Daisuke Dobashi; Masaki Takahashi; Ryuki Morikubo; Tomoko Kan; Yuya Goto
2024; Details	(Chinese Taipei); Taipei	Mongolia (men's) Japan (women's)	(Japan); Mitsuhiko Tatsunami	(Hong Kong); Ho-Tung Ching & Yu-Kwong Tang	(Japan); Yukie Sakaguchi	(Australia); A-Reum Kim & Yun-Ji Kim	Chinese Taipei (men's) Japan (women's)

== WDF Cup ==
- WDF World Cup
- WDF World Darts Championship
- WDF Europe Cup
- WDF Americas Cup
- World Masters (darts)
- Australian Darts Open
- Dutch Open (darts)

== Asia Pacific Championships ==
- Asia Pacific Poker Tour
- Asia Pacific Yo-Yo Championships
- Asia-Pacific Rally Championship
- Pacific-Asia Curling Championships
- Asia-Pacific Golf Confederation
- Asia Pacific Bowls Championships
- Asia Pacific Bridge Championships - World Bridge Federation
- Asia Pacific Bowling Championships - Asian Bowling Federation
- FESPIC Games
- Asia Pacific Deaf Games
- IIHF Women's Pacific Rim Championship
- IIHF Asian Oceanic U18 Championships
- Asia Oceania Floorball Confederation
- Pacific Rim Championships

== See also ==
- Asia-Pacific Telecommunity band plan
- Asia-Pacific Economic Cooperation
- Asia-Pacific International University
- Asia-Pacific Broadcasting Union
- Asia-Pacific Scout Region (World Organization of the Scout Movement)
- Asia Pacific Resources International Holdings
