= Tina Osborne =

Personal information
- Born: 4 May 1979 (age 47) Ashburton, New Zealand
- Home town: Auckland, New Zealand

Sport
- Sport: Darts
- Playing since: 2002
- Laterality: Right-handed
- Walk-on music: Can't Get You Out of My Head by Kylie Minogue

Organisation (see split in darts)
- BDO: 2014–2020
- WDF: 2014-
- Current world ranking: (WDF W) NR (17 August 2026)

WDF major events – best performances
- World Championship: Last 16: 2016
- World Masters: Last 128: 2015, 2019

Tina Osborne (born 4 May 1979) is a New Zealand darts player who competes in World Darts Federation events. Of Māori descent, her iwi (tribal) affiliations are to Ngāti Porou and Ngāti Awa.

== World Championship results ==
=== BDO ===
- 2016: Last 16 (lost to Zoe Jones 1–2)
