= Mike Day (darts player) =

New Zealand darts player

Personal information
- Full name: Mike Day
- Nickname: Wino
- Born: 31 July 1955 (age 71) Auckland, New Zealand
- Home town: Auckland, New Zealand

Sport
- Sport: Darts
- Playing since: 1981
- Darts: 23 Gram Shot
- Laterality: Right-handed
- Walk-on music: "Play That Funky Music" by Wild Cherry

Organisation (see split in darts)
- BDO: 2009–2020
- WDF: 2009–
- Current world ranking: (WDF) NR (17 August 2026)

WDF major events – best performances
- World Championship: Last 32: 2014
- World Trophy: Last 32: 2014

Other tournament wins
- Tournament: Years
- Canterbury Open: 2013

Mike Day (born 31 July 1955 in Auckland) is a New Zealand professional darts player who currently plays in World Darts Federation events. He reached the first round of the 2014 BDO World Darts Championship.

== Career ==
In 2013 he won the Canterbury Open, he beat Tony Carmichael in the final 5–4. He qualified for the 2014 BDO World Darts Championship, he played Sam Head in the preliminary round winning 3–0 before losing to Glen Durrant in the first round 3–0. He qualified for the 2015 BDO World Darts Championship, he played Jeff Smith in the preliminary round losing 3–0.

== World Championship results ==
=== BDO ===
- 2014: First Round (lost to Glen Durrant 0–3) (sets)
- 2015: Preliminary round (lost to Jeff Smith 0–3)
