= Craig Caldwell =

New Zealand darts player

Personal information
- Nickname: CC
- Born: 20 January 1973 (age 53) Auckland, New Zealand
- Home town: Titahi Bay, New Zealand

Sport
- Sport: Darts
- Playing since: 1990
- Darts: 23 gram Shot! Signature darts
- Laterality: Right-handed
- Walk-on music: "Sandstorm" by Darude

Organisation (see split in darts)
- BDO: 2007–2013, 2015–2019
- PDC: 2013–2015, 2019–

WDF major events – best performances
- World Championship: Last 32: 2016
- World Trophy: Last 32: 2016

Other tournament wins
- Years
Alan King Memorial	2015
Auckland Open	2008, 2015, 2017
Canterbury Classic	2017
Canterbury Open	2015
New Zealand Masters	2011
New Zealand Open	2012
North Island Masters	2016
Super League Darts	2015
Ted Clements Memorial	2015
Medal record
Men's Darts
Representing New Zealand
WDF Asia-Pacific Cup
Silver medal – second place	2012 Darwin	Men's pairs
Bronze medal – third place	2012 Darwin	Team event

Craig Caldwell (born 20 January 1973) is a New Zealand professional darts player who competes in Professional Darts Corporation (PDC) tournaments. His major sponsors are SHOT and KW Decorators.

== Career ==
Caldwell topped the New Zealand regional table in the 2014/15 season to win a place in the preliminary round of the 2016 BDO World Darts Championship. He previously appeared in televised tournaments in the PDC, competing in the PDC World Cup of Darts in 2013 and 2014, as well as the Auckland Darts Masters, Perth and Sydney Darts masters in 2015. In his World Championship debut he defeated Alan Soutar with a respectable 90 average and also went six darts into a perfect leg. Caldwell hit nine 180's in a first round match at the Lakeside World Championships in 2016, which equaled the current record. Caldwell won the inaugural televised New Zealand national Super league in 2015. Caldwell is the only player to hit a 9 dart finish in a New Zealand ranking event in 2015.

== World Championship results ==
=== BDO ===
- 2016: 1st Round (lost to Scott Mitchell 2–3) (sets)
- 2017: Preliminary Round (lost to Dennis Harbour 1–3)
- 2018: Preliminary Round (lost to Daniel Day 0–3)
