= Peter Hunt (darts player) =

New Zealand darts player

Personal information
- Nickname: "Stumpy"
- Born: 22 January 1965 (age 61) Greytown, New Zealand
- Home town: Palmerston North, New Zealand

Sport
- Sport: Darts
- Playing since: 1985
- Darts: 24g Puma nickel tungsten
- Laterality: Right-handed
- Walk-on music: "U Can't Touch This" by MC Hammer

Organisation (see split in darts)
- BDO: 1992–2018

WDF major events – best performances
- World Championship: Last 16: 1995
- World Trophy: Last 32: 2003, 2004
- Int. Darts League: Last 16 Group: 2004

Other tournament wins
- Tournament: Years
- Australian Grand Masters DPNZ Hawkes Bay Open New Zealand Masters New Zealand Open North Island Masters Ted Clements Open: 2003 2012 1993, 1997, 1998, 1999, 2002, 2009, 2010; 2003, 2010; 2009, 2011, 2012; 2011, 2012
Medal record
Men's Darts
Representing New Zealand
WDF Asia-Pacific Cup
Silver medal – second place	2002 Bangkok	Men's singles
Silver medal – second place	2002 Bangkok	Team event

Peter Hunt (born 22 January 1965) is a New Zealand former professional darts player who played in the BDO/WDF and PDC circuit. With multiple titles to his name, he was one of New Zealand's leading darts players.

== Career ==
Hunt has played in four BDO World Darts Championships, first qualifying in 1993, the last unified World Championship before the infamous split in darts, losing 3–0 to Scotland's Ronnie Sharp. He returned in 1995, beating Belgium's Stefan Eeckelaert 3–0 in the first round before losing 3–2 in the second round to Colin Monk. It would be eight years before Hunt returned to Lakeside in 2003, losing in the first round to Bob Taylor. He returned a year layer, but again lost in round one to Paul Hogan.

Hunt also played twice in the International Darts League. In 2003, he lost both of his opening group games to Vincent van der Voort and Tony O'Shea and was eliminated despite beating Shaun Greatbatch. In 2004, Hunt won his opening two group games against Tony David and Co Stompé and qualified for the last 16 group stages. But after two crushing defeats, 7–1 against Mervyn King and 7–0 against Martin Adams, Hunt was eliminated but managed to restore some pride in a 7–6 win over Vincent van der Voort.

Hunt played in the World Darts Trophy twice but lost in the first round on both occasions. In 2003, he lost 3–2 to Bob Taylor and in 2004, he was beaten by Raymond van Barneveld 3–1.

Hunt is a winner of the New Zealand Masters a record seven times, with his first win coming in 1993 and his latest win in 2010.

== World Championship results ==
=== BDO ===
- 1993: 1st Round (lost to Ronnie Sharp 0–3) (sets)
- 1995: 2nd Round (lost to Colin Monk 2–3)
- 2003: 1st Round (lost to Bob Taylor 0–3)
- 2004: 1st Round (lost to Raymond van Barneveld 1–3)
