= Cody Harris (darts player) =

New Zealand darts player (born 1985)

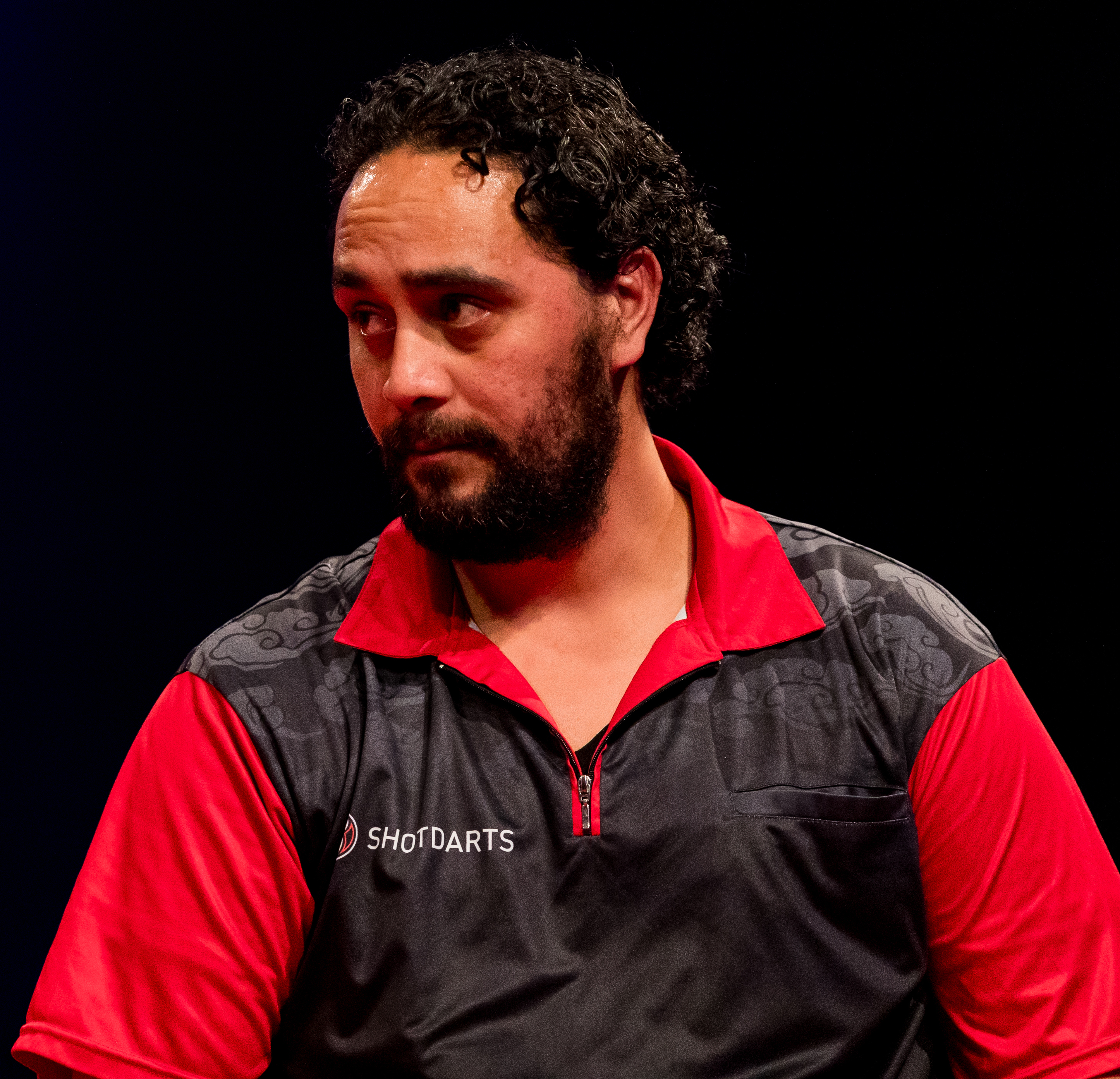
- Harris in 2019

Personal information
- Nickname: "The Codestar"
- Born: 9 October 1985 (age 41) Auckland, New Zealand

Sport
- Sport: Darts
- Playing since: 1994
- Darts: Shot! Cody Harris Steel Tip
- Laterality: Right-handed
- Walk-on music: "Thunder" by Imagine Dragons

Organisation (see split in darts)
- BDO: 2009–2017
- PDC: 2018–2022

WDF major events – best performances
- World Masters: Last 32: 2015

PDC premier events – best performances
- World Championship: Last 64: 2018, 2019
- UK Open: Last 96: 2018
- World Series Finals: Last 16: 2020

Other tournament wins
- Years
Alan King Memorial	2017
Auckland Open	2012, 2013, 2014
Canterbury Classic	2016
DPA Australian Matchplay	2016
DPA Australian Pro Tour Hobart	2017
DPA Australian Pro Tour Sydney	2017
DPA Australian Pro Tour Warilla	2017
DPA World Series Qualifier	2017 (x2)
DPNZ Auckland Open	2012
Harrows Australian GP	2015, 2016
New Zealand Masters	2017, 2018
New Zealand National Ch'ships	2015
New Zealand Open	2014, 2015, 2016
North Island Masters	2015, 2017
PDC Challenge Tour	2018, 2019
PDC World New Zealand Qualifying	2017
Sydney Masters Qualifier	2015
Ted Clements Open	2016, 2017

Cody Harris (born 10 October 1985) is a former New Zealand darts player.

== Career ==
Harris comes from a family of dart players. His father ran the ACDC Dart Club and Harris watched as a child his parents and other family members when they played. When Eric Bristow came to New Zealand for the WDF World Cup, Harris' father played against him and won. When Harris was around eight years old he for the first time threw a dart.

When Harris was nine he won the A grade Championship for the Auckland Darts Association and he for the first time took part in the national championship when he was 13. Many national successes followed including the win in the 2015 Sydney Darts Masters Qualifier and the National Championship 2015. Internationally, his biggest success so far was the last 32 of the Winmau World Masters in 2015 where he lost to Scott Waites 3–0.

In 2016, he represented New Zealand together along with Warren Parry in the PDC World Cup of Darts. They played Scotland (consisting of Gary Anderson and Robert Thornton), and after breaking the throw with a 125 checkout, he and Parry led 3–1, before Scotland won four legs in a row to win 5–3. At the 2017 event, Harris and Rob Szabo were eliminated 5–2 by Belgium in the opening round.

Harris entered the 2018 PDC Q-School.

== World Championship results ==
=== PDC ===
- 2018: 1st Round (lost to Ian White 1–3)
- 2019: 2nd Round (lost to Jamie Lewis 2–3)

== Performance timeline ==
PDC

Tournament	2016	2017	2018	2019	2020
PDC World Championship	Non-PDC		1R	2R	DNQ
UK Open	DNQ		2R	2R	2R
Non-major televised events
PDC World Cup of Darts	1R	1R	1R	QF	2R
