= 2020 BDO & WDF calendar =

Tournament information
- Dates: Yearly
- Country: Worldwide
- Organisation(s): BDO, WDF
- Format: 501 Legs (men's & women's)
- Prize fund: Depends on tournament's category

2020 BDO & WDF season of darts comprises every tournament of British Darts Organisation and World Darts Federation. The category or prize money of the tournaments may be vary depending on darts organization.

BDO and WDF most important tournaments are the BDO World Darts Championship and WDF World Cup.

== Tournament categories, points and prize money ==
=== BDO ===
British Darts Organization		Points						
Category	Prize Fund (£)	1st	2nd	3/4	5/8	9/16	17/32	33/48
Special Events	–	49	42	35	28	21	14	7
A+	£10,000	49	42	35	28	21	14	7
A	£7,000	35	30	25	20	15	10	5
B	£5,000	24	20	16	12	8	4	
C	£3,000	18	15	12	9	6	3	
D	£1,000	14	12	10	8	6		

=== WDF ===
World Darts Federation		Points						
Category	Prize Fund ($)	1st	2nd	3/4	5/8	9/16	17/32	33/64
Platinum	It depends on each tournament	270	167	103	64	39	26	13
Gold	It depends on each tournament	180	111	68	43	26	17	9
Silver	It depends on each tournament	90	56	34	21	13	9	
Bronze	It depends on each tournament	45	28	17	11	6		

== Calendar ==
=== January ===
Date	Tournament	BDO		WDF		Venue	City	Prize money	Men's			Women's		
Date	Tournament	M	W	M	W	Venue	City	Prize money	winner	score	runner-up	winner	score	runner-up
4–12 January	BDO World Championship	WC				indigo at The O2	(England) London	£153,500	(Wales) Wayne Warren	7–4	(Wales) Jim Williams	(Japan) Mikuru Suzuki	3–0	(England) Lisa Ashton
18 January	Las Vegas Open	C	C	Silver		Tuscany Suites and Casino	(United States) Las Vegas	$6,325	(United States) Chris Lim	6–4	(United States) Danny Baggish	(United States) Paula Murphy	5–0	(United States) Kelly Meares
25 January	Tri City Open	D	D	Silver		The Inn of Waterloo	(Canada) Waterloo	$2,910	(Canada) Matt Campbell	bt.	(Canada) Keifer Durham	(Canada) Darlene Van Sleeuwen	bt.	(Canada) Patricia Farrell
25–26 January	Reykjavik International Games			Bronze		Reykjavík Dartclub	(Iceland) Reykjavík	n/a	(Iceland) Páll Árni Pétursson	7–4	(Iceland) Friðrik Diego	(Iceland) Ingibjörg Magnúsdóttir	7–2	(Iceland) María Steinunn Jóhannesdóttir
25–26 January	Snoflake Open	D	D	Bronze		River Cree Resort & Casino	(Canada) Edmonton	C$4,750	(Canada) Jim Edwards	bt.	(Canada) Ken MacNeil	(Canada) Crystal Chiasson	bt.	(Canada) Terril Chappell
25–26 January	Romanian Classic	C	C	Silver		InterContinental Hotel	(Romania) Bucharest	RON 24,160	(Wales) Wayne Warren	6–3	(Catalonia) Martin Martí	(England) Amanda Harwood	5–1	(Netherlands) Marjolein Noijens
26 January	Romanian International	A	C	Silver		InterContinental Hotel	(Romania) Bucharest	RON 46,000	(Wales) Nick Kenny	6–4	(Romania) László Kádar	(England) Deta Hedman	5–2	(Netherlands) Anca Zijlstra
26 January	Victorian Classic			Bronze		Italian Australian Club	(Australia) Morwell	AU$6,700	(Australia) Aaron Morrison	8–7	(Australia) Jeremy Fagg	(Australia) Tori Kewish	6–1	(Australia) Joanne Hadley

=== February ===
Date	Tournament	BDO		WDF		Venue	City	Prize money	Men's			Women's		
Date	Tournament	M	W	M	W	Venue	City	Prize money	winner	score	runner-up	winner	score	runner-up
1–2 February	Dutch Open			Platinum		De Bonte Wever	(Netherlands) Assen	€26,850	(Scotland) Ross Montgomery	3–1	(Belgium) Brian Raman	(Netherlands) Aileen de Graaf	5–2	(Netherlands) Anca Zijlstra
8 February	Canterbury Classic	D	D			Canterbury & Suburban Darts Assoc.	(New Zealand) Christchurch	NZ$6,500	(New Zealand) Darren Herewini	6–4	(New Zealand) Tukina Weko	(New Zealand) Wendy Harper	5–3	(New Zealand) Desi Mercer
8 February	Camellia Classic	C	C	Bronze		Sacramento Crowne Plaza	(United States) Sacramento	$6,780	(United States) Leonard Gates	5–2	(United States) Joe Chaney	(United States) Teresa Quan	5–0	(United States) Stacey Pace
9 February	Quebec Open	D	D	Bronze		Sheraton Saint-Hyacinthe Hôtel	(Canada) Saint-Hyacinthe	C$3,800	(Canada) David Cameron	bt.	(Canada) Keifer Durham	(Canada) Samantha Gibbons	bt.	(Canada) Darlene Van Sleeuwen
15 February	Syracuse Open	D	C			Holiday Inn	(United States) Liverpool	$5,110	(Canada) Gary Mawson	bt.	(Canada) Keifer Durham	(Canada) Kim Gulis	bt.	(Canada) Trish Grzesik
15–16 February	Scottish Open	A	B	Gold		Normandy Cosmopolitan Hotel	(Scotland) Renfrew	£10,550	(Wales) Jim Williams	6–2	(England) Steve Hine	(England) Beau Greaves	5–2	(England) Fallon Sherrock
21–22 February	Slovak Masters	B	B	Silver		x-bionic® sphere	(Slovakia) Šamorín	€8,460	(Wales) Wayne Warren	6–5	(England) David Evans	(England) Maria O'Brien	5–4	(England) Deta Hedman
22 February	Slovak Open	A	A	Silver		x-bionic® sphere	(Slovakia) Šamorín	€8,460	(Netherlands) Chris Landman	6–1	(Poland) Sebastian Steyer	(England) Lorraine Winstanley	5–4	(England) Laura Turner
22 February	Port City Open	Unranked				Holiday Inn Portland-by the Bay	(United States) Portland	$4,550	(Canada) David Cameron	4–3	(United States) Chris Franklin	(United States) Stacey Pace	4–3	(United States) Cali West

=== March ===
Date	Tournament	BDO		WDF		Venue	City	Prize money	Men's			Women's		
Date	Tournament	M	W	M	W	Venue	City	Prize money	winner	score	runner-up	winner	score	runner-up
7 March	~~United International Open~~	A	A	Silver		Sportcentrum Hoorn	(Netherlands) Hoorn	€8,510	Cancelled due to organizational issues					
8 March	~~United International Masters~~	A	A	Silver		Sportcentrum Hoorn	(Netherlands) Hoorn	€8,510	Cancelled due to organizational issues					
7–8 March	Halifax Open	D	D	Bronze		Bedford Legion Club	(Canada) Bedford	C$2,560	(Canada) Nick Smith	4–3	(Canada) Rod Snow	(Canada) Patricia Farrell	4–3	(Canada) Karrah Boutilier
7–8 March	Greater Vancouver Open	C	D	Silver		Sheraton Vancouver Airport Hotel	(Canada) Richmond	C$5,440	(Canada) Rory Hansen	bt.	(Canada) Sean Smyth	(United States) Carole Herriott	bt.	(Canada) Roxanne Van Tassel
8 March	Newcastle Classic			Bronze		Kahibah Sports Club	(Australia) Kahibah	AU$4,300	(Australia) Justin Thompson	bt.	(Australia) Steve Kewish	(Australia) Tori Kewish	bt.	(Australia) Leanne Clegg
12–15 March	Isle of Man Classic	B	A			Villa Marina	(Isle of Man) Douglas	£8,000	(Scotland) Cameron Menzies	4–0	(England) Jason Heaver	(England) Fallon Sherrock	4–2	(England) Beau Greaves
13–15 March	Isle of Man Masters			Silver		Villa Marina	(Isle of Man) Douglas	£1,995	(France) Thibault Tricole	4–3	(Northern Ireland) Neil Duff	(England) Fallon Sherrock	4–3	(England) Beau Greaves
14–15 March	Isle of Man Open	A+	A+			Villa Marina	(Isle of Man) Douglas	£15,500	(Wales) Michael Warburton	5–2	(England) Martin Adams	(England) Fallon Sherrock	4–2	(England) Beau Greaves
14 March	~~Budapest Classic~~	C	C	Bronze		János Simon Basketball Arena	(Hungary) Budapest	HUF1,334,000	Cancelled due to COVID-19					
15 March	~~Budapest Masters~~	C	C	Bronze		János Simon Basketball Arena	(Hungary) Budapest	HUF1,334,000	Cancelled due to COVID-19					
14 March	~~Sylt Open~~			Bronze		Sportzentrum Tinnum	(Germany) Sylt	€4,800	Cancelled due to COVID-19					
15 March	~~Sylt Classics~~			Bronze		Sportzentrum Tinnum	(Germany) Sylt	€3,000	Cancelled due to COVID-19					
15 March	West Coast Classic			Bronze		Belmont Sports & Recreation Club	(Australia) Cloverdale	AU$2,000	(Australia) Peter Machin	6–3	(Australia) David Platt	(Australia) Tori Kewish	6–4	(Australia) Dot McLeod
14–15 March	Hub City Open			Bronze		Shediac Multi Purpose Centre	(Canada) Shediac	C$2,990	(Canada) David Cameron	bt.	(Canada) Robert Piercy	(Canada) Karrah Boutilier	bt.	(Canada) Danna Foster
17–20 March	~~Sol Príncipe Masters~~	C				Sol Príncipe Hotel	(Spain) Torremolinos	£3,040	Cancelled due to COVID-19					
19–20 March	~~Sol Príncipe Masters~~	C				Sol Príncipe Hotel	(Spain) Torremolinos	£3,040	Cancelled due to COVID-19					
17–20 March	~~Sol Príncipe Ladies Classic~~		C			Sol Príncipe Hotel	(Spain) Torremolinos	£1,100	Cancelled due to COVID-19					
19–20 March	~~Sol Príncipe Ladies Classic~~		C			Sol Príncipe Hotel	(Spain) Torremolinos	£1,100	Cancelled due to COVID-19					
21 March	~~WDF Youth Challenge~~			WDF		JUFA Hotel Wien	(Austria) Vienna	n/a	Cancelled due to COVID-19 in Austria					
21 March	~~Gibraltar Open~~			Bronze		George Federico Darts Hall	Gibraltar	£1,880	Cancelled due to COVID-19 in Gibraltar					

=== April ===
Date	Tournament	BDO		WDF		Venue	City	Prize money	Men's			Women's		
Date	Tournament	M	W	M	W	Venue	City	Prize money	winner	score	runner-up	winner	score	runner-up
4 April	~~Acropolis Open~~	D	C	Bronze		Athenaeum Palace & Luxury Suites	(Greece) Athens	€4,270	Cancelled due to COVID-19 in Greece					
5 April	~~Greek Open~~	C	C	Bronze		Athenaeum Palace & Luxury Suites	(Greece) Athens	€6,460	Cancelled due to COVID-19 in Greece					
4–5 April	~~The Main Event~~	D	C			ANAVETS club	(Canada) Saskatoon	C$5,200	Cancelled due to COVID-19 in Canada					
11 April	~~South Island Masters~~	D	D	Bronze		The Appleby Complex	(New Zealand) Invercargill	NZ$2,880	Cancelled due to COVID-19 in New Zealand					
12 April	~~Victorian Easter Classic~~			Bronze		Geelong Darts Club	(Australia) Geelong	AU$4,800	Cancelled due to COVID-19 in Australia					
13 April	~~Geelong Club Singles~~			Bronze		Geelong Darts Club	(Australia) Geelong	AU$4,800	Cancelled due to COVID-19 in Australia					
18 April	~~White Mountain Shootout~~			Bronze		Town & Country Inn & Resort	(United States) Shelburne	$4,900	Cancelled due to COVID-19 in USA					
18 April	~~Bull's German Open~~	A	B	Gold		Wunderland Kalkar	(Germany) Kalkar	€23,500	Cancelled due to COVID-19 in Germany					
19 April	~~Bull's Darts Masters~~	A	B	Silver		Wunderland Kalkar	(Germany) Kalkar	€23,500	Cancelled due to COVID-19 in Germany					
18 April	~~Estonia Open~~	D	D	Bronze		Radisson Blu Hotel Tallinn	(Estonia) Tallinn	€2,530	Cancelled due to COVID-19 in Estonia					
19 April	~~Estonia Masters~~	D	D	Bronze		Radisson Blu Hotel Tallinn	(Estonia) Tallinn	€1,990	Cancelled due to COVID-19 in Estonia					
26 April	~~North Island Masters~~	D	D	Bronze		Hastings Dart Hall	(New Zealand) Hastings	NZ$3,980	Cancelled due to COVID-19 in New Zealand					
26 April	~~Murray Bridge GP~~			Bronze		Murray Bridge Darts Club	(Australia) White Hill	AU$5,930	Cancelled due to COVID-19 in Australia					

=== May ===
Date	Tournament	BDO		WDF		Venue	City	Prize money	Men's			Women's		
Date	Tournament	M	W	M	W	Venue	City	Prize money	winner	score	runner-up	winner	score	runner-up
2 May	~~Cleveland Extravaganza~~	D	D	Bronze		Holiday Inn	(United States) Strongsville	$3,170	Cancelled due to COVID-19 in Ohio/United States					
2 May	~~Denmark Open~~	A+	A+	Gold		Granly Hockey Arena	(Denmark) Esbjerg	DKK130,300	Cancelled due to COVID-19 in Denmark					
3 May	~~Denmark Masters~~	A	A	Silver		Granly Hockey Arena	(Denmark) Esbjerg	DKK90,300	Cancelled due to COVID-19 in Denmark					
8 May	~~Welsh Classic~~	A	B	Silver		Prestatyn Sands Holiday Park	(Wales) Prestatyn	£9,260	Cancelled due to COVID-19 in Wales					
10 May	~~Welsh Open~~	A+	A+	Gold		Prestatyn Sands Holiday Park	(Wales) Prestatyn	£22,380	Cancelled due to COVID-19 in Wales					
9 May	~~Lithuania Open~~	D	D	Bronze		Panorama Hotel	(Lithuania) Vilnius	€1,730	Cancelled due to COVID-19 in Lithuania					
10 May	~~Vilnius Open~~	D	D	Bronze		Panorama Hotel	(Lithuania) Vilnius	€1,730	Cancelled due to COVID-19 in Lithuania					
16–17 May	~~Finnish Open~~	D	D	Bronze		Original Sokos Hotel Vantaa	(Finland) Vantaa	€8,150	Cancelled due to COVID-19 in Finland					
10 May	~~Finnish Masters~~	D	D	Bronze		Original Sokos Hotel Vantaa	(Finland) Vantaa	€4,650	Cancelled due to COVID-19 in Finland					
23 May	~~Polish Open~~	C	C	Silver		Hotel Dobosz	(Poland) Police	zł20,200	Cancelled due to COVID-19 in Poland					
24 May	~~Police Masters~~	D	D	Silver		Hotel Dobosz	(Poland) Police	zł15,500	Cancelled due to COVID-19 in Poland					
24 May	~~Sunshine State Classic~~			Bronze		Inala Darts Club	(Australia) Inala	AU$5,900	Cancelled due to COVID-19 in Australia					
23–24 May	~~Mediterranean Open~~			Bronze		Grand Haber Hotel	(Turkey) Kemer	–	Cancelled due to COVID-19 in Turkey					
25–26 May	~~Mediterranean Masters~~			Bronze		Grand Haber Hotel	(Turkey) Kemer	–	Cancelled due to COVID-19 in Turkey					
31 May	~~Canterbury Open~~	D	D	Bronze		Canterbury & Suburban Darts Assoc.	(New Zealand) Christchurch	NZ$3,640	Cancelled due to COVID-19 in New Zealand					
31 May	~~Lincolnshire Open~~	D	D			The Blues Club	(England) Gainsborough	£2,512	Cancelled due to COVID-19 in England					

=== June ===
Date	Tournament	BDO		WDF		Venue	City	Prize money	Men's			Women's		
Date	Tournament	M	W	M	W	Venue	City	Prize money	winner	score	runner-up	winner	score	runner-up
6 June	~~Mongolia Open~~			Bronze		Grand Hill Hotel	(Mongolia) Ulaanbaatar	₮2,810,000	Cancelled due to COVID-19 in Mongolia					
7 June	~~Mongolia Masters~~			Bronze		Grand Hill Hotel	(Mongolia) Ulaanbaatar	₮2,710,000	Cancelled due to COVID-19 in Mongolia					
6 June	~~Swiss Open~~	B	B	Silver		Chliriethalle	(Switzerland) Oberglatt	CHF18,500	Cancelled due to COVID-19 in Switzerland					
7 June	~~Helvetia Open~~	C	C	Silver		Chliriethalle	(Switzerland) Oberglatt	CHF18,500	Cancelled due to COVID-19 in Switzerland					
7 June	~~Melton Classic~~			Bronze		Melton Dart Club	(Australia) Melton	$5,850	Cancelled due to COVID-19 in Australia					
13 June	~~New Zealand Masters~~			Bronze		Kapi Mana Darts Association	(New Zealand) Porirua	NZ$5,500	Cancelled due to COVID-19 in New Zealand					
20 June	~~Canadian Open~~	D	D	Bronze		Centre 200	(Canada) Sydney	C$6,000	Cancelled due to COVID-19 in Canada					
20 June	~~Charlotte Open~~	D	D	Bronze		Sheraton Airport Hotel	(United States) Charlotte	$2,880	Cancelled due to COVID-19 in the United States					
20 June	~~Austrian Open Vienna~~	D	D	Bronze		Hilton Garden Inn	(Austria) Vienna	€2,260	Cancelled due to COVID-19 in Austria					
21 June	~~Vienna Open~~	D	D	Bronze		Hilton Garden Inn	(Austria) Vienna	€2,260	Cancelled due to COVID-19 in Austria					
18–21 June	~~Six Nations Cup~~ (T)	BDO				Normandy Hotel	(Scotland) Renfrew	£3,000	Cancelled due to COVID-19 in Scotland					
21 June	~~LDO Ladies Classic~~	–	B			The Blues Club	(England) Gainsborough	£2,060	Cancelled due to COVID-19 in England					
27 June	~~BDO Gold Cup~~	BDO				Magna Centre	(England) Rotherham	n/a	Cancelled due to COVID-19 in England					
28 June	~~BDO Champions Cup~~ (T)	BDO				Magna Centre	(England) Rotherham	n/a	Cancelled due to COVID-19 in England					
27–28 June	~~Australian Grand Masters~~			Silver		Canberra Labour Club	(Australia) Canberra	AU$11,300	Cancelled due to COVID-19 in Australia					
28 June	~~International on the Water Classic~~			Bronze		International on the Water Hotel	(Australia) Ascot	AU$4,000	Cancelled due to COVID-19 in Australia					

=== July ===
Date	Tournament	BDO		WDF		Venue	City	Prize money	Men's			Women's		
Date	Tournament	M	W	M	W	Venue	City	Prize money	winner	score	runner-up	winner	score	runner-up
4 July	~~Apatin Open~~			Bronze		Bowling Club MS Elkop	(Serbia) Apatin	€2,500	Cancelled due to COVID-19 in Serbia					
4 July	~~BDO Youth Festival of Darts~~	BDO				Magna Centre	(England) Rotherham	£1,500	Cancelled due to COVID-19 in England					
4–5 July	~~BDO International Open~~	BDO				Magna Centre	(England) Rotherham	£1,500	Cancelled due to COVID-19 in England					
8–12 July	~~WDF Europe Cup Youth~~ (T)			WDF		Budapesti Honvéd Sportegyesület	(Hungary) Budapest	n/a	Postponed to 2021 due to COVID-19 in Hungary					
25 July	~~Luxembourg Open~~			Bronze		D'Coque	Luxembourg City	€7,250	Cancelled due to COVID-19 in Luxembourg					
26 July	~~Luxembourg Masters~~			Bronze		D'Coque	Luxembourg City	€7,250	Cancelled due to COVID-19 in Luxembourg					
26 July	~~Japan Open~~			Bronze		Ota-Ku Sangyo Plaza PIO	(Japan) Tokyo	JP¥1,240,000	Cancelled due to COVID-19 in Japan					
18 July	~~Cheshire Ladies Open~~	–	EDO			Coppenhall Working Men's Club	(England) Crewe	£950	Cancelled due to COVID-19 in England					
19 July	~~Cheshire Open~~	EDO				Coppenhall Working Men's Club	(England) Crewe	£2,310	Cancelled due to COVID-19 in England					
24–26 July	~~WDF Americas Cup~~ (S)			WDF		–	(Jamaica) Kingston	n/a	Cancelled due to COVID-19 in Jamaica					
25–26 July	~~WDF Americas Cup~~ (T)			WDF		–	(Jamaica) Kingston	n/a	Cancelled due to COVID-19 in Jamaica					

=== August ===
Date	Tournament	BDO		WDF		Venue	City	Prize money	Men's			Women's		
Date	Tournament	M	W	M	W	Venue	City	Prize money	winner	score	runner-up	winner	score	runner-up
2 August	~~Pacific Masters~~			Bronze		Rich River Golf Club	(Australia) Moama	AU$9,880	Cancelled due to COVID-19 in Australia					
8 August	~~Antwerp Open~~	B	B	Silver		Royal Yacht Club België	(Belgium) Antwerp	€8,120	Cancelled due to COVID-19 in Belgium					
9 August	~~Belgium Open~~	B	B	Silver		Royal Yacht Club België	(Belgium) Antwerp	€8,120	Cancelled due to COVID-19 in Belgium					
12 August	~~New Zealand Open~~	D	C	Silver		Energy Events Centre	(New Zealand) Rotorua	NZ$7,230	Cancelled due to COVID-19 in New Zealand					
14 August	~~LDO Swedish Classic~~	–	C	Bronze		Scandic Triangle Hotel	(Sweden) Malmö	SEK12,400	Cancelled due to COVID-19 in Sweden					
15 August	~~Swedish Open~~	A	A	Silver		Scandic Triangle Hotel	(Sweden) Malmö	SEK117,400	Cancelled due to COVID-19 in Sweden					
16 August	~~Gents Classic~~	D	–	Bronze		Scandic Triangle Hotel	(Sweden) Malmö	SEK12,400	Cancelled due to COVID-19 in Sweden					
21–22 August	~~Salavat Yulaev Cup~~			Bronze		tba	(Russia) Ufa	RUB_	Cancelled due to COVID-19 in Russia					
22 August	~~French Open~~			Bronze		Salle Dany Boon	(France) Bray-Dunes	€7,800	Cancelled due to COVID-19 in France					
23 August	~~French Classic~~			Bronze		Salle Dany Boon	(France) Bray-Dunes	€5,210	Cancelled due to COVID-19 in France					
29 August	~~Cherry Bomb Int'l.~~	D	D			Fort Lauderdale Marriott North	(United States) Fort Lauderdale	$2,390	Cancelled due to COVID-19 in Florida					
30 August	~~Murray Bridge Classic~~			Bronze		Murray Bridge Darts Club	(Australia) White Hill	AU$_	Cancelled due to COVID-19 in Australia					
28–30 August	~~BDO World Trophy~~	WT				King George's Hall	(England) Blackburn	£47,000	Cancelled due to COVID-19 in England					
31 August	~~West Midlands Open~~	B	B			Allen's Sports Bar	(England) Tipton	£7,000	Cancelled due to COVID-19 in England					

=== September ===
Date	Tournament	BDO		WDF		Venue	City	Prize money	Men's			Women's		
Date	Tournament	M	W	M	W	Venue	City	Prize money	winner	score	runner-up	winner	score	runner-up
5 September	~~Washington Area Open~~			Silver		Holiday Inn	(United States) Sterling	$2,950	Cancelled due to COVID-19 in Virginia, USA					
5 September	~~Catalonia Open~~	C	C	Bronze		Fábrica Llobet-Gurí	(Catalonia) Calella	€5,720	Cancelled due to COVID-19 in Spain/Catalonia					
6 September	~~FCD Anniversary Open~~	D	D	Bronze		Fábrica Llobet-Gurí	(Catalonia) Calella	€2,760	Cancelled due to COVID-19 in Spain/Catalonia					
5 September	~~Iceland Open~~	D	D	Bronze		Hlemmur Square Hostel	(Iceland) Reykjavík	£1,500	Cancelled due to COVID-19 in Iceland					
6 September	~~Iceland Masters~~	D	D	Bronze		Hlemmur Square Hostel	(Iceland) Reykjavík	£1,500	Cancelled due to COVID-19 in Iceland					
7–9 September	~~WDF Asia-Pacific Cup~~ (S)			WDF		–	(Taiwan) Taipei	n/a	Cancelled due to COVID-19 in Taiwan					
10–11 September	~~WDF Asia-Pacific Cup~~ (T)			WDF		–	(Taiwan) Taipei	n/a	Cancelled due to COVID-19 in Taiwan					
11–13 September	~~England National Singles~~	B	B	Silver		Bunn Leisure Holiday Centre	(England) Selsey	£7,300	Cancelled due to COVID-19 in England					
12-13 September	~~England Open~~	A+	A+	Gold		Bunn Leisure Holiday Centre	(England) Selsey	£21,600	Cancelled due to COVID-19 in England					
12–13 September	~~Taiwan Open~~			Bronze		NTSU	(Taiwan) Taoyuan	NT$83,000	Cancelled due to COVID-19 in Taiwan					
13 September	~~Taranaki Open~~			Bronze		The Devon Hotel	(New Zealand) New Plymouth	NZ$8,100	Cancelled due to COVID-19 in New Zealand					
19 September	~~Witch City Open~~			Gold		Sturbridge Host Hotel	(United States) Sturbridge	US$5,425	Cancelled due to COVID-19 in Massachusetts, USA					
19–20 September	~~Novi Sad Open~~			Silver		–	(Serbia) Novi Sad	–	Cancelled due to COVID-19 in Serbia					
19–20 September	~~Phoenix Open~~			Bronze		Shédiac Multipurpose Centre	(Canada) Shediac	C$3,365	Cancelled due to COVID-19 in Canada					
19 September	~~BDO British Classic~~	A	B			Bridlington Spa	(England) Bridlington	£9,960	Cancelled due to COVID-19 in England					
20 September	~~BDO British Open~~	A+	B			Bridlington Spa	(England) Bridlington	£14,760	Cancelled due to COVID-19 in England					
20 September	~~North Queensland Classic~~			Bronze		Townsville Darts Assoc.	(Australia) Annandale	AU$6,000	Cancelled due to COVID-19 in Australia					
26 September	~~Belfry Open~~	B	B	Silver		Sporthal Tempelhof	(Belgium) Bruges	€8,140	Cancelled due to COVID-19 in Serbia					
27 September	~~Bruges Open~~	B	B	Silver		Sporthal Tempelhof	(Belgium) Bruges	€11,680	Cancelled due to COVID-19 in Serbia					
30 September–3 October	~~WDF Europe Cup~~ (S)			WDF		–	(Spain)	n/a	Cancelled due to COVID-19 in Spain					
29 September–3 October	~~WDF Europe Cup~~ (T)			WDF		–	(Spain)	n/a	Cancelled due to COVID-19 in Spain					

=== October ===
Date	Tournament	BDO		WDF		Venue	City	Prize money	Men's			Women's		
Date	Tournament	M	W	M	W	Venue	City	Prize money	winner	score	runner-up	winner	score	runner-up
4 October	~~Australian Masters~~			Bronze		Geelong Darts Club	(Australia) Geelong	AU$16,000	Cancelled due to COVID-19 in Australia					
4 October	~~Spanish Open~~			Gold		–	(Spain) –	–	Cancelled due to COVID-19 in Spain					
10 October	~~Auckland Open~~	D	D	Bronze		West City Darts Assoc.	(New Zealand) Ranui	NZ$3,750	Cancelled due to COVID-19 in New Zealand					
8–11 October	~~Egypt Open~~			Bronze		Blue House Hotel	(Egypt) Marsa Alam	$27,000	Cancelled due to COVID-19 in Egypt					
11 October	~~Klondike Open~~			Silver		River Cree Resort & Casino	(Canada) Enoch	C$4,500	Cancelled due to COVID-19 in Canada					
17 October	~~Virginia Beach Classic~~	C	C			Wyndham Virginia Beach Oceanfront	(United States) Virginia Beach	$6,570	Cancelled due to COVID-19 in Virginia, USA					
18 October	~~Korean Open~~			Gold		PDK Darts Stadium	(South Korea) Seoul	KRW2,700,000	Cancelled due to COVID-19 in South Korea					
16–18 October	~~N. Cyprus Masters~~	A	–			Kaya Artemis Resort & Casino	(Northern Cyprus) Vokolida	€4,200	Cancelled due to COVID-19 in Northern Cyprus					
16–18 October	~~N. Cyprus Ladies Classic~~	–	A			Kaya Artemis Resort & Casino	(Northern Cyprus) Vokolida	€2,070	Cancelled due to COVID-19 in Northern Cyprus					
17–18 October	~~N. Cyprus Open~~	A	A			Kaya Artemis Resort & Casino	(Northern Cyprus) Vokolida	€11,500	Cancelled due to COVID-19 in Northern Cyprus					
17–18 October	~~N. Ireland Open~~			Silver		Bellini's	(Northern Ireland) Newry	£4,650	Cancelled due to COVID-19 in Northern Ireland					
17–18 October	~~N. Ireland Matchplay~~			Silver		Bellini's	(Northern Ireland) Newry	£4,650	Cancelled due to COVID-19 in Northern Ireland					
24 October	~~Alan King Memorial~~	D	D	Bronze		Otago Darts Association	(New Zealand) Dunedin	NZ$4,000	Cancelled due to COVID-19 in Canada					
24 October	~~Tórshavn Open~~			Bronze		Glasir Sports Hall	(Faroe Islands) Tórshavn	kr.19,400	Cancelled due to COVID-19 in the Faroe Islands					
25 October	~~Faroe Islands Open~~			Bronze		Glasir Sports Hall	(Faroe Islands) Tórshavn	kr.19,400	Cancelled due to COVID-19 in the Faroe Islands					
25 October	~~Bunbury Grand Prix~~			Bronze		–	(Australia) Bunbury	–	Cancelled due to COVID-19 in Australia					
21–25 October	~~World Masters~~	WM				Circus Tavern	(England) Purfleet	£70,500	Cancelled due to COVID-19 in England					
25 October	~~Bob Jones Memorial~~			Bronze		Astra Lounge, CFB Trenton	(Canada) Trenton	C$4,500	Cancelled due to COVID-19 in Canada					
29–30 October	~~Turkish Open~~			Bronze		Göynük Atatürk Spor Salonu	(Turkey) Kemer	n/a	Cancelled due to COVID-19 in Turkey					
31 October–1 November	~~Turkish Masters~~			Bronze		Göynük Atatürk Spor Salonu	(Turkey) Kemer	n/a	Cancelled due to COVID-19 in Turkey					
31 October	~~Latvia Open~~	C	C	Bronze		Bellevue Park Hotel	(Latvia) Riga	€4,840	Cancelled due to COVID-19 in Latvia					
1 November	~~Riga Open~~	C	D	Bronze		Bellevue Park Hotel	(Latvia) Riga	€4,225	Cancelled due to COVID-19 in Latvia					
31 October	Hungarian Classic			Unranked		Hotel Hungária City Center	(Hungary) Budapest	HUF1,000,000	(Hungary) Rajmund Papp	7–4	(Hungary) Csaba Helfrich	(Hungary) Veronika Ihász	6–1	(Hungary) Éva Németh
1 November	Hungarian Masters			Unranked		Hotel Hungária City Center	(Hungary) Budapest	HUF1,000,000	(Hungary) Gábor Takács	7–5	(Hungary) Rajmund Papp	(Hungary) Veronika Ihász	6–1	(Hungary) Éva Németh

=== November ===
Date	Tournament	BDO		WDF		Venue	City	Prize money	Men's			Women's		
Date	Tournament	M	W	M	W	Venue	City	Prize money	winner	score	runner-up	winner	score	runner-up
7 November	~~Seacoast Open~~			Bronze		DoubleTree by Hilton	(United States) Andover	$5,170	Cancelled due to COVID-19 in Massachusetts, USA					
7–8 November	~~Welsh Masters~~	A	A	Silver		Lyons Robin Hood Holiday Park	(Wales) Rhyl	–	Cancelled due to COVID-19 in Wales					
8 November	~~Great Lakes Open~~			Bronze		Club Forster	(Australia) Forster	AU$4,420	Cancelled due to COVID-19 in Australia					
14 November	~~Colorado Open~~			Silver		DoubleTree by Hilton	(United States) Denver	$4,120	Cancelled due to COVID-19 in Colorado, USA					
14 November	~~Irish Open~~			Gold		Killarney Convention Centre	(Republic of Ireland) Killarney	€18,500	Cancelled due to COVID-19 in the Republic of Ireland					
15 November	~~HP Roofing Open~~			Silver		Killarney Convention Centre	(Republic of Ireland) Killarney	€5,800	Cancelled due to COVID-19 in the Republic of Ireland					
18–19 November	~~Malta Open~~	B	B	Silver		Monte Kristo Estates	(Malta) Luqa	€8,100	Cancelled due to COVID-19 in Malta					
21 November	~~Czech Open~~	A	A	Gold		Hotel Pyramida	(Czech Republic) Prague	CZK300,200	Cancelled due to COVID-19 in Czech Republic					
22 November	~~Ted Clements Memorial~~	D	D	Bronze		Levin Cosmopolitan Club	(New Zealand) Levin	NZ$3,000	Cancelled due to COVID-19 in New Zealand					
22 November	~~Hong Kong Open~~			Silver		KITEC	Hong Kong	HK$39,000	Cancelled due to COVID-19 in Hong Kong					
28 November	~~Russian Open~~	D	D	Bronze		Hotel Park Krestovskiy	(Russia) Saint Petersburg	RUB231,000	Cancelled due to COVID-19 in Russia					
29 November	~~Saint Petersburg Open~~	D	D	Bronze		Hotel Park Krestovskiy	(Russia) Saint Petersburg	RUB184,500	Cancelled due to COVID-19 in Russia					
28 November	~~Italian Grand Masters~~			Silver		Grand Hotel Bologna	(Italy) Pieve di Cento	€11,500	Cancelled due to COVID-19 in Italy					
29 November	~~Italian Open~~			Silver		Grand Hotel Bologna	(Italy) Pieve di Cento	€5,470	Cancelled due to COVID-19 in Italy					

=== December ===
Date	Tournament	BDO		WDF		Venue	City	Prize money	Men's			Women's		
Date	Tournament	M	W	M	W	Venue	City	Prize money	winner	score	runner-up	winner	score	runner-up
3–6 December	~~England Classic~~	A+	A			Bunn Leisure Holiday Centre	(England) Selsey	£13,500	Cancelled due to COVID-19 in England					
3–6 December	~~England Masters~~	C	B			Bunn Leisure Holiday Centre	(England) Selsey	£6,100	Cancelled due to COVID-19 in England					
4–6 December	~~Golden Darts Open~~			Gold		Bunn Leisure Holiday Centre	(England) Selsey	£22,000	Announced on 11 August as a new WDF-Gold label tournament but cancelled nine days later due to COVID-19 related issues					
4–6 December	~~Gold Cup Open~~			Gold		Bunn Leisure Holiday Centre	(England) Selsey	£22,000	Announced on 11 August as a new WDF-Gold label tournament but cancelled nine days later due to COVID-19 related issues					

== Statistical information ==
The players/nations are sorted by:

1. Total number of titles;
2. Cumulated importance of those titles;
3. Alphabetical order (by family names for players).
- ø symbol stands for a both BDO and WDF sanctioned tournament, meaning that only a 1 title is accounted. When a BDO-WDF sanctioned tournament, highest category priority.

=== Key ===
Tournament categories
BDO	WDF
Special Event	
A+/A	Platinum
B	Gold
C	Silver
D	Bronze

=== Titles won by player (men's) ===
Total	Player	Category								
Total	Player	S/E	A+/A	Platinum	B	Gold	C	Silver	D	Bronze
3	Wayne Warren (WAL)	●			ø		ø	ø ø		
2	David Cameron (CAN)								ø	ø ●
1	Chris Landman (NED)		ø					ø		
1	Michael Warburton (WAL)		●							
1	Jim Williams (WAL)		ø			ø				
1	Ross Montgomery (SCO)			●						
1	Cameron Menzies (SCO)				●					
1	Leonard Gates (USA)						ø			ø
1	Rory Hansen (CAN)						ø	ø		
1	Nick Kenny (WAL)						ø	ø		
1	Chris Lim (USA)						ø	ø		
1	Matt Campbell (CAN)							ø	ø	
1	Thibault Tricole (FRA)							●		
1	Jim Edwards (CAN)								ø	ø
1	Darren Herewini (NZL)								●	
1	Gary Mawson (CAN)								●	
1	Nick Smith (CAN)								ø	ø
1	Peter Machin (AUS)									●
1	Aaron Morrison (AUS)									●
1	Páll Árni Pétursson (ISL)									●
1	Justin Thompson (AUS)									●

=== Titles won by nation (men's) ===
Total	Nation	Category								
Total	Nation	S/E	A+/A	Platinum	B	Gold	C	Silver	D	Bronze
7	Canada (CAN)						ø	ø ø	ø ø ø ● ø	ø ø ø ●
5	Wales (WAL)	●	ø ●		ø	ø	ø	ø ø		
3	Australia (AUS)									● ● ●
2	Scotland (SCO)			●	●					
2	United States (USA)						ø ø	ø		ø
1	Netherlands (NED)		ø					ø		
1	France (FRA)							●		
1	New Zealand (NZL)								●	
1	Iceland (ISL)									●

=== Titles won by player (women's) ===
Total	Player	Category								
Total	Player	S/E	A+/A	Platinum	B	Gold	C	Silver	D	Bronze
3	Fallon Sherrock (ENG)		● ●					●		
3	Tori Kewish (AUS)									● ● ●
1	Mikuru Suzuki (JPN)	●								
1	Lorraine Winstanley (ENG)		ø					ø		
1	Aileen de Graaf (NED)			●						
1	Beau Greaves (ENG)				ø	ø				
1	Maria O'Brien (ENG)				ø			ø		
1	Kim Gulis (CAN)						●			
1	Amanda Harwood (ENG)						ø	ø		
1	Deta Hedman (ENG)						ø	ø		
1	Paula Murphy (USA)						ø	ø		
1	Teresa Quan (USA)						ø			ø
1	Carole Herriott (USA)							ø	ø	
1	Darlene Van Sleeuwen (CAN)							ø	ø	
1	Crystal Chiasson (CAN)								ø	ø
1	Patricia Farrell (CAN)								ø	ø
1	Samantha Gibbons (CAN)								ø	ø
1	Wendy Harper (NZL)								●	
1	Karrah Boutilier (CAN)									●
1	Ingibjörg Magnúsdóttir (ISL)									●

=== Titles won by nation (women's) ===
Total	Nation	Category								
Total	Nation	S/E	A+/A	Platinum	B	Gold	C	Silver	D	Bronze
8	England (ENG)		ø ● ●		ø ø	ø	ø ø	ø ø ø ø ●		
6	Canada (CAN)						●	ø	ø ø ø ø	ø ø ø ●
3	United States (USA)						ø ø	ø ø	ø	ø
3	Australia (AUS)									● ● ●
1	Japan (JPN)	●								
1	Netherlands (NED)			●						
1	Iceland (ISL)									●
