= 2022 WDF calendar =

Tournament information
- Dates: Yearly
- Country: Worldwide
- Organisation(s): WDF
- Format: 501 Legs (men's & women's)
- Prize fund: Depends on tournament's category

The 2022 WDF season of darts comprised every tournament of the World Darts Federation. The prize money of the tournaments may vary depending on its category.

Two of the WDF's most prestigious events were in 2022, the WDF World Darts Championship (held in April), and the WDF World Masters (held in December).

2022 was the second year in darts under WDF-sole management after the demise of BDO in 2020.

== Tournament categories, points & prize money ==
World Darts Federation		Points						
Category	Prize Fund ($)	1st	2nd	3/4	5/8	9/16	17/32	33/64
Platinum	It depends on each tournament	270	167	103	64	39	26	13
Gold	It depends on each tournament	180	111	68	43	26	17	9
Silver	It depends on each tournament	90	56	34	21	13	9	
Bronze	It depends on each tournament	45	28	17	11	6		

== Calendar ==
=== January ===
Date	Tournament	Cat.	Venue	City	Prize money	Men's			Women's		
Date	Tournament	Cat.	Venue	City	Prize money	winner	score	runner-up	winner	score	runner-up
January 5	Kalashnikov Cup	Bronze	Izhevsk State Medical Academy	(Russia) Izhevsk	₽121,000	(Russia) Aleksei Kadochnikov	6–2	(Russia) Alexey Nagovitsin	(Russia) Yuliana Khityaeva	6–2	(Russia) Natalia Aleksandrova
January 6	Udmurtia Open	Bronze	Izhevsk State Medical Academy	(Russia) Izhevsk	₽81,000	(Russia) Aleksei Kadochnikov	6–3	(Russia) Aleksandr Basharin	(Russia) Elena Shulgina	6–4	(Russia) Natalia Aleksandrova
January 15	Las Vegas Open	Silver	Tuscany Suites and Casino	(United States) Paradise	$7,430	(United States) Jim Widmayer	6–4	(United States) Gary Mawson	(United States) Julie Weger	5–4	(United States) Shea Cole

=== February ===
Date	Tournament	Cat.	Venue	City	Prize money	Men's			Women's		
Date	Tournament	Cat.	Venue	City	Prize money	winner	score	runner-up	winner	score	runner-up
February 5–6	Reykjavik International Games	Bronze	Bullseye Reykjavik	(Iceland) Reykjavík	n/a	(England) John Scott	7–5	(Iceland) Vitor Charrua	(England) Margaret Sutton	7–2	(Iceland) Ingibjörg Magnúsdóttir
February 19	Syracuse Open	Non-ranked	The Ramada by Wyndham	(United States) Salina	$4,000	(United States) Larry Butler	4–1	(United States) Joey Lynaugh	(United States) Paula Murphy	4–2	(Canada) Maria Carli
February 26	Camellia Classic	Silver	Hard Rock Hotel & Casino	(United States) Wheatland	$6,780	(United States) Leonard Gates	5–4	(United States) Jeff Springer	(United States) Paula Murphy	5–3	(United States) Lisa Yee
February 26	Port City Open	Non-ranked	DoubleTree by Hilton Hotel Portland	(United States) South Portland	$3,300	(United States) Jay Waugh	3–2	(United States) Zack Pearson	(United States) Carolyn Mars	3–2	(United States) Cali West
February 26	Slovak Open	Silver	x-bionic® sphere	(Slovakia) Šamorín	€8,000	(Romania) László Kádár	5–4	(England) Scott Marsh	(England) Jo Clements	5–2	(England) Suzanne Smith
February 27	Slovak Masters	Bronze	x-bionic® sphere	(Slovakia) Šamorín	€4,000	(Northern Ireland) Neil Duff	5–2	(Netherlands) Moreno Blom	(England) Laura Turner	5–2	(England) Lorraine Winstanley

=== March ===
Date	Tournament	Cat.	Venue	City	Prize money	Men's			Women's		
Date	Tournament	Cat.	Venue	City	Prize money	winner	score	runner-up	winner	score	runner-up
March 5	Missouri St. Patricks Open	Bronze	Inn at Grand Glaize	(United States) Osage Beach	$2,295	(United States) Dustin Holt	6–3	(United States) Eric Gregory	(United States) Julie Weger	4–3	(United States) Liz Tynan
March 6	NSW Great Lakes Open	Bronze	Club Forster	(Australia) Forster	AU$4,380	(Australia) Brendan Porter	5–3	(Australia) Scott Bretherton	(Brazil) Monica Ribeiro	4–0	(Australia) Leanne Clegg
March 10–13	Isle of Man Classic	Silver	Villa Marina	(Isle of Man) Douglas	£7,012	(England) James Hurrell	6–3	(England) Luke Littler	(England) Beau Greaves	5–0	(England) Deta Hedman
March 11–13	Isle of Man Masters	Non-ranked	Villa Marina	(Isle of Man) Douglas	£1,995	(Scotland) Ryan Hogarth	5–4	(Hong Kong) Kai Fan Leung	(England) Beau Greaves	5–2	(England) Deta Hedman
March 12–13	Isle of Man Open	Gold	Villa Marina	(Isle of Man) Douglas	£15,695	(England) Dave Prins	6–3	(England) Ashley Hurrell	(England) Beau Greaves	5–1	(England) Deta Hedman
March 12	Budapest Classic	Bronze	Budapest Honvéd Sports Complex	(Hungary) Budapest	HUF1,000,000	(Hungary) Patrik Kovács	6–4	(Hungary) Gábor Jagicza	(Sweden) Anna Forsmark	5–2	(Czech Republic) Jitka Císarová
March 13	Budapest Masters	Bronze	Budapest Honvéd Sports Complex	(Hungary) Budapest	HUF1,000,000	(Hungary) András Borbély	6–3	(Hungary) János Végső	(Sweden) Anna Forsmark	5–2	(Czech Republic) Jitka Císarová
April 15–18	Torremolinos Open	Non-ranked	Sol Príncipe Hotel	(Spain) Torremolinos	€4,070	(England) Steve Smith	4–1	(Spain) Aurelio Ortega	(England) Donna Gleed	4–1	(England) Mary Paine
April 17–18	Torremolinos Classic	Non-ranked	Sol Príncipe Hotel	(Spain) Torremolinos	€4,070	(Wales) Callum Goffin	4–0	(England) Martin Wheawall	(England) Paula Jacklin	4–3	(England) Donna Gleed
March 19	Gibraltar Open	Bronze	George Federico Darts Hall	Gibraltar	£2,500	(England) Paul Marsh	4–2	(Catalonia) Carles Arola	(England) Diane Nash	4–2	(England) Paula Jacklin
March 19	Tórshavn Open	Bronze	Glasir Sports Hall	(Faroe Islands) Tórshavn	kr.19,400	(Sweden) Edwin Torbjörnsson	5–1	(Sweden) Ricky Nauman	(Sweden) Maud Jansson	4–2	(Sweden) Susianne Hägvall
March 20	Faroe Islands Open	Bronze	Glasir Sports Hall	(Faroe Islands) Tórshavn	kr.19,400	(Sweden) Henrik Sjöberg	5–2	(Sweden) Viktor Tingström	(Sweden) Anna Forsmark	4–3	(Sweden) Susianne Hägvall

=== April ===
Date	Tournament	Cat.	Venue	City	Prize money	Men's			Women's		
Date	Tournament	Cat.	Venue	City	Prize money	winner	score	runner-up	winner	score	runner-up
April 2–10	WDF World Darts Championship	Platinum	Lakeside Country Club	(England) Frimley Green	£287,500	(Northern Ireland) Neil Duff	6–5	(France) Thibault Tricole	(England) Beau Greaves	4–0	(England) Kirsty Hutchinson
April 17	Victorian Easter Classic	Bronze	Geelong Darts Club	(Australia) Geelong	AU$4,600	(Australia) Sam Ballinger	8–5	(Australia) Brandon Weening	(Australia) Amanda Loch	6–4	(Australia) Joanne Hadley
April 24	Murray Bridge Grand Prix	Bronze	Murray Bridge Darts Club	(Australia) White Hill	AU$4,800	(Australia) Peter Machin	8–4	(Australia) Tony Pettit	(Australia) Kym Mitchell	6–4	(Australia) Abbey Morrison
April 23–24	Scottish Open	Gold	Normandy Cosmopolitan Hotel	(Scotland) Renfrew	£10,550	(England) James Hurrell	6–5	(Scotland) Ryan Murray	(England) Deta Hedman	5–4	(England) Jo Clements
April 23–24	Iceland Open	Bronze	Bullseye Reykjavik	(Iceland) Reykjavík	kr280,000	(Hungary) Gábor Takács	7–5	(Iceland) Guðjón Hauksson	(Iceland) Ingibjörg Magnúsdóttir	7–2	(Iceland) Brynja Herborg Jónsdóttir
April 30	Cleveland Extravaganza	Silver	Holiday Inn	(United States) Strongsville	$5,000	(United States) Danny Lauby	5–2	(United States) Larry Butler	(United States) Aaja Jalbert	5–3	(United States) Paula Murphy
April 30	Denmark Open	Gold	Granly Hockey Arena	(Denmark) Esbjerg	DKK139,200	(Poland) Sebastian Białecki	6–1	(England) Darren Johnson	(England) Deta Hedman	5–3	(Netherlands) Anca Zijlstra
May 1	Denmark Masters	Silver	Granly Hockey Arena	(Denmark) Esbjerg	DKK60,600	(England) James Richardson	6–5	(Netherlands) Jelle Klaasen	(England) Suzanne Smith	5–3	(Norway) Rachna David
April 30–May 1	Snoflake Open	Bronze	Edmonton Inn & Conference Centre	(Canada) Edmonton	C$5,100	(Canada) Kiley Edmunds	5–2	(Canada) Shaun Narain	(Canada) Brenda Moreau	4–2	(Canada) Wenda Carter
April 30–May 1	Shediac Open	Bronze	Shédiac Multipurpose Centre	(Canada) Shédiac	C$2,690	(Canada) Keith Way	5–4	(Canada) Noah Savard	(Canada) Karrah Kennedy	4–0	(Canada) Hayley Crowley

=== May ===
Date	Tournament	Cat.	Venue	City	Prize money	Men's			Women's		
Date	Tournament	Cat.	Venue	City	Prize money	winner	score	runner-up	winner	score	runner-up
May 6–8	Welsh Classic	Silver	Prestatyn Sands Holiday Park	(Wales) Prestatyn	£7,605	(Northern Ireland) Barry Copeland	6–5	(England) Graham Hall	(England) Fallon Sherrock	5–4	(Wales) Rhian O'Sullivan
May 8	Welsh Open	Gold	Prestatyn Sands Holiday Park	(Wales) Prestatyn	£17,460	(England) Luke Littler	6–2	(England) Wes Newton	(England) Beau Greaves	5–4	(England) Fallon Sherrock
May 8	West Japan Cup	Bronze	Daito City Civic Hall	(Japan) Daitō	¥340,000	(Japan) Jun Matsuda	5–1	(Japan) Mitsuhiko Tatsunami	(Japan) Mikuru Suzuki	4–1	(Japan) Yukie Sakaguchi
May 21	Lithuania Open	Bronze	Žalgiris Arena	(Lithuania) Kaunas	€1,730	(Netherlands) Alexander Merkx	5–1	(England) Aaron Turner	(England) Margaret Sutton	4–1	(Lithuania) Eglė Galdikaitė
May 22	Kaunas Open	Bronze	Žalgiris Arena	(Lithuania) Kaunas	€1,730	(England) John Scott	5–0	(Sweden) Dennis Nilsson	(Latvia) Kristīne Mickus	4–3	(England) Margaret Sutton
May 22	Sunshine State Classic	Bronze	Inala Darts Club	(Australia) Inala	AU$4,800	(Australia) Raymond Smith	6–2	(Australia) Anthony Shreeve	(Australia) Tori Kewish	6–3	(Australia) Lyn Morrison
May 28	Oregon Open	Bronze	Chinook Winds Casino Resort	(United States) Lincoln City	$2,650	(United States) Danny Lauby	6–3	(Canada) Rory Hansen	(United States) Cassy Scantlen	5–4	(United States) Corrine Davis
May 29	Nordic Cup Open	Bronze	Scandic Triangeln	(Sweden) Malmö	SEK15,000	(Sweden) Andreas Harrysson	5–4	(Sweden) Ricky Nauman	(Norway) Veronica Simonsen	4–0	(Sweden) Anna Forsmark

=== June ===
Date	Tournament	Cat.	Venue	City	Prize money	Men's			Women's		
Date	Tournament	Cat.	Venue	City	Prize money	winner	score	runner-up	winner	score	runner-up
June 4	Swiss Open	Silver	Grand Casino Basel	(Switzerland) Basel	€8,000	(Hungary) Gábor Takács	5–2	(England) Martyn Turner	(Netherlands) Anca Zijlstra	5–4	(England) Suzanne Smith
June 5	Helvetia Open	Silver	Grand Casino Basel	(Switzerland) Basel	€8,000	(Netherlands) Alexander Merkx	5–3	(Belgium) Andy Baetens	(England) Suzanne Smith	5–4	(Netherlands) Adriana van Wijgerden-Vermaat
June 5	Canterbury Open	Bronze	Canterbury & Suburban Darts Assoc.	(New Zealand) Christchurch	NZ$4,040	(New Zealand) Haupai Puha	5–3	(New Zealand) Ben Robb	(New Zealand) Nicole Regnaud	4–2	(New Zealand) Wendy Harper
June 11–12	Dutch Open	Platinum	De Bonte Wever	(Netherlands) Assen	€26,250	(Netherlands) Jelle Klaasen	3–0	(Scotland) Mark Barilli	(England) Beau Greaves	5–1	(Wales) Rhian O'Sullivan
June 11	Cherry Bomb International	Bronze	Embassy Suites by Hilton	(United States) Boca Raton	$3,850	(United States) Danny Lauby	6–2	(United States) Gary Mawson	(Canada) Maria Carli	6–0	(United States) Ashley Richey
June 18	New Zealand Masters	Silver	Kapi Mana Darts Association	(New Zealand) Porirua	NZ$6,270	(New Zealand) Haupai Puha	5–4	(New Zealand) Mark Cleaver	(New Zealand) Wendy Harper	5–1	(New Zealand) Nicole Regnaud
June 18	Canadian Open	Silver	Delta Hotels by Marriott	(Canada) Toronto	C$8,200	(Canada) Nick Smith	5–0	(Canada) Jim Long	(Canada) Maria Carli	4–1	(Canada) Stef Smith
June 18	Balaton Classics	Bronze	Szent István Hotel	(Hungary) Balatonlelle	HUF1,000,000	(Romania) László Kádár	5–4	(Hungary) András Borbély	(Czech Republic) Jitka Císarová	5–2	(Hungary) Veronika Ihász
June 19	Balaton Masters	Bronze	Szent István Hotel	(Hungary) Balatonlelle	HUF1,000,000	(Slovenia) Benjamin Pratnemer	5–2	(Romania) László Kádár	(Czech Republic) Jitka Císarová	5–0	(Hungary) Adrienn Végső
June 17–19	Six Nations Cup (S)	Non-ranked	Normandy Hotel	(Scotland) Renfrew	n/a	(Netherlands) Wesley Plaisier	5–4	(England) Scott Taylor	(England) Beau Greaves	5–2	(Wales) Rhian O'Sullivan
June 17–19	Six Nations Cup (T)	Non-ranked	Normandy Hotel	(Scotland) Renfrew	n/a	Netherlands	13–11	England	Ireland	5–4	England
June 25	South Island Masters	Bronze	Otepuni Community Hub	(New Zealand) Invercargill	NZ$3,400	(New Zealand) Ben Robb	5–3	(New Zealand) Haupai Puha	(New Zealand) Nicole Regnaud	4–0	(New Zealand) Desi Mercer
June 25–26	Romanian International	Silver	Grand Hotel Bucharest	(Romania) Bucharest	€8,000	(Hungary) Patrik Kovács	5–0	(England) Scott Marsh	(England) Beau Greaves	5–0	(England) Jo Clements
June 26	Romanian Classic	Bronze	Grand Hotel Bucharest	(Romania) Bucharest	€4,280	(England) Luke Littler	5–1	(Netherlands) Jelle Klaasen	(Czech Republic) Jitka Císarová	4–1	(England) Roz Bulmer
June 26	Victorian Classic	Silver	Italian Australian Club	(Australia) Morwell	AU$6,700	(Australia) Mal Cuming	8–7	(Australia) Peter Machin	(Australia) Tori Kewish	6–5	(Australia) Kym Mitchell

=== July ===
Date	Tournament	Cat.	Venue	City	Prize money	Men's			Women's		
Date	Tournament	Cat.	Venue	City	Prize money	winner	score	runner-up	winner	score	runner-up
July 9–10	England Open	Silver	Brean Sands Holiday Park	(England) Burnham-on-Sea	£10,060	(England) David Pallett	5–4	(England) Graham Hall	(England) Beau Greaves	5–0	(Wales) Cathy Hughes
July 10	England National Singles	Silver	Brean Sands Holiday Park	(England) Burnham-on-Sea	£10,060	(England) Scott Marsh	5–3	(England) Darren Johnson	(Wales) Rhian O'Sullivan	5–1	(Netherlands) Aileen de Graaf
July 9	Apatin Open	Bronze	Apatin Tehnička škola	(Serbia) Apatin	€2,580	(Croatia) Dean Biškupić	5–2	(Slovenia) Benjamin Pratnemer	(Hungary) Veronika Ihász	4–1	(Czech Republic) Jitka Císařová
July 10	Serbia Open	Bronze	Apatin Tehnička škola	(Serbia) Apatin	€2,580	(Hungary) Patrik Kovács	5–3	(Romania) László Kádár	(Hungary) Veronika Ihász	4–3	(Czech Republic) Jitka Císařová
July 13–16	WDF Europe Cup U18 (S)	WDF	Budapest Honvéd Sports Complex	(Hungary) Budapest	n/a	(England) Luke Littler	6–1	(England) Archie Self	(Italy) Aurora Fochesato	5–1	(England) Amy Evans
July 13–16	WDF Europe Cup U18 (T)	WDF	Budapest Honvéd Sports Complex	(Hungary) Budapest	n/a	England	9–0	Ireland			
July 13–16	WDF Europe Cup U21 (S)	WDF	Budapest Honvéd Sports Complex	(Hungary) Budapest	n/a	(Czech Republic) Tomáš Houdek	6–5	(Czech Republic) David Záruba	(Denmark) Anick Sonnichsen	5–0	(Hungary) Gréta Tekauer
July 13–16	WDF Europe Cup U21 (T)	WDF	Budapest Honvéd Sports Complex	(Hungary) Budapest	n/a	Czech Republic	9–8	Hungary			
July 23	Bud Brick Memorial	Silver	Sumida Industry Hall	(Japan) Sumida	JP¥668,000	(Singapore) Paul Lim	5–1	(Japan) Masumi Chino	(Japan) Mayumi Ouchi	5–3	(Japan) Kiyo Shimizu
July 24	Japan Open	Silver	Sumida Industry Hall	(Japan) Sumida	JP¥1,024,000	(Singapore) Paul Lim	5–3	(Japan) Mitsuhiko Tatsunami	(Japan) Mikuru Suzuki	5–0	(Japan) Yoko Tsukui
July 24	New Zealand Open	Gold	Energy Events Centre	(New Zealand) Rotorua	NZ$14,585	(New Zealand) Ben Robb	6–5	(New Zealand) Haupai Puha	(New Zealand) Victoria Monaghan	5–4	(New Zealand) Wendy Harper

=== August ===
Date	Tournament	Cat.	Venue	City	Prize money	Men's			Women's		
Date	Tournament	Cat.	Venue	City	Prize money	winner	score	runner-up	winner	score	runner-up
August 3–6	Australian Open	Platinum	Moama Bowling Club	(Australia) Moama	AU$80,000	(Australia) Raymond Smith	10–9	(New Zealand) Haupai Puha	(England) Beau Greaves	8–5	(Japan) Mikuru Suzuki
August 7	Pacific Masters	Silver	Rich River Golf Club	(Australia) Moama	AU$10,400	(Northern Ireland) Neil Duff	6–2	(New Zealand) Haupai Puha	(England) Lisa Ashton	5–1	(Australia) Tori Kewish
August 6	Antwerp Open	Silver	Royal Yacht Club België	(Belgium) Antwerp	€8,120	(Wales) Jamie Lewis	5–2	(Netherlands) Kay Smeets	(Netherlands) Aletta Wajer	5–3	(England) Laura Turner
August 7	Belgium Open	Silver	Royal Yacht Club België	(Belgium) Antwerp	€8,120	(Netherlands) Wesley Plaisier	5–0	(Netherlands) Johan van Velzen	(England) Laura Turner	5–3	(England) Lorraine Winstanley
August 13	John Wilkie Memorial	Silver	Hutt Valley Darts Association	(New Zealand) Taitā	NZ$5,880	(New Zealand) Johnny Tata	5–4	(New Zealand) Tahuna Irwin	(New Zealand) Wendy Harper	5–2	(New Zealand) Nicole Regnaud
August 20	Swedish Open	Silver	Scandic Triangeln	(Sweden) Malmö	SEK84,940	(Hong Kong) Kai Fan Leung	5–1	(Netherlands) Alexander Merkx	(England) Lorraine Winstanley	5–3	(Netherlands) Aletta Wajer
August 21	Swedish Masters	Silver	Scandic Triangeln	(Sweden) Malmö	SEK84,940	(Netherlands) Dennie Olde Kalter	5–2	(England) Antony Allen	(Netherlands) Aileen de Graaf	5–1	(England) Paula Jacklin
August 28	Murray Bridge Classic	Bronze	Murray Bridge Darts Club	(Australia) White Hill	AU$4,800	(Australia) Brandon Weening	5–3	(Australia) Aaron Morrison	(Australia) Melina van den Kieboom	4–2	(Australia) Lyn Morrison

=== September ===
Date	Tournament	Cat.	Venue	City	Prize money	Men's			Women's		
Date	Tournament	Cat.	Venue	City	Prize money	winner	score	runner-up	winner	score	runner-up
September 3	Van Diemen Classic	Bronze	Launceston Workers Club	(Australia) Launceston	AU$3,440	(Australia) Peter Machin	5–2	(Australia) Steve Fitzpatrick	(Australia) Tereasa Morris	4–2	(Australia) Lee-Ann Faulkner
September 4	Tasmanian Classic	Bronze	Launceston Workers Club	(Australia) Launceston	AU$3,440	(Australia) Steve Fitzpatrick	5–4	(Australia) Peter Machin	(Australia) Lee-Ann Faulkner	4–1	(Australia) Emma Watkins
September 3	Catalonia Open	Bronze	Fábrica Llobet-Gurí	(Catalonia) Calella	€3,400	(Netherlands) Patrick Maat	5–1	(Netherlands) Alexander Merkx	(Belgium) Patricia De Peuter	4–3	(Norway) Ramona Eriksen
September 4	FCD Anniversary Open	Bronze	Fábrica Llobet-Gurí	(Catalonia) Calella	€3,400	(Republic of Ireland) Shane McGuirk	5–4	(Belgium) Andy Baetens	(Sweden) Maud Jansson	4–3	(Sweden) Anna Forsmark
September 9	Blueberry Hill Open	Non-ranked	Blueberry Hill	(United States) University City	$1,500	(United States) Jules van Dongen	3–0	(United States) Trevor Buboltz	(United States) Lisa Ayers	3–1	(United States) Brenda Roush
September 10	Taranaki Open	Silver	Taranaki Darts Association	(New Zealand) New Plymouth	NZ$6,250	(New Zealand) Ben Robb	6–4	(New Zealand) Tahuna Irwin	(New Zealand) Wendy Harper	5–3	(New Zealand) Victoria Monaghan
September 17	Auckland Open	Bronze	West City Darts Association	(New Zealand) Ranui	NZ$3,400	(New Zealand) Mark Cleaver	5–2	(New Zealand) AJ Te Kira	(New Zealand) Nicole Regnaud	4–3	(New Zealand) Wendy Harper
September 18	North Queensland Classic	Silver	Townsville Darts Association	(Australia) Annandale	AU$6,100	(Australia) Aaron Morrison	6–1	(Australia) John Matheson	(Australia) Kym Mitchell	5–0	(Australia) Seini Vakanofiti
September 16–18	British Open	Gold	Bridlington Spa	(England) Bridlington	£17,000	(England) Reece Colley	6–3	(Netherlands) Chris Landman	(England) Lisa Ashton	5–1	(Netherlands) Aileen de Graaf
September 17–18	British Classic	Silver	Bridlington Spa	(England) Bridlington	£7,000	(England) James Richardson	6–4	(Scotland) Gary Stone	(England) Beau Greaves	5–1	(England) Lisa Ashton
September 23–25	England International Open	Non-ranked	Ilfracombe Holiday Park	(England) Ilfracombe	£2,075	(England) Luke Littler	5–4	(Wales) Nick Kenny	(England) Lisa Ashton	4–1	(England) Dee Bateman
September 24–25	England Classic	Gold	Ilfracombe Holiday Park	(England) Ilfracombe	£15,695	(Wales) Robert Owen	6–5	(England) Daniel Perry	(England) Beau Greaves	5–0	(England) Lisa Ashton
September 28–October 1	WDF Europe Cup (S)	WDF	Versus Gandía Palace Hotel	(Spain) Gandia	n/a	(France) Jacques Labre	7–2	(Finland) Teemu Harju	(England) Beau Greaves	7–4	(Spain) Almudena Fajardo
September 28–October 1	WDF Europe Cup (T)	WDF	Versus Gandía Palace Hotel	(Spain) Gandia	n/a	England	9–8	Netherlands	England	9–1	Netherlands

=== October ===
Date	Tournament	Cat.	Venue	City	Prize money	Men's			Women's		
Date	Tournament	Cat.	Venue	City	Prize money	winner	score	runner-up	winner	score	runner-up
October 2	Spanish Open	Silver	Versus Gandía Palace Hotel	(Spain) Gandia	€8,000	(France) Jacques Labre	6–5	(Czech Republic) Vítězslav Sedlák	(Wales) Rhian O'Sullivan	6–2	(Netherlands) Lerena Rietbergen
October 8	Belfry Open	Silver	Sporthal Tempelhof	(Belgium) Bruges	€7,725	(England) James Hurrell	5–3	(Netherlands) Dennie Olde Kalter	(Netherlands) Aileen de Graaf	5–0	(Belgium) Patricia De Peuter
October 9	Bruges Open	Silver	Sporthal Tempelhof	(Belgium) Bruges	€7,725	(Belgium) Andy Baetens	5–4	(Belgium) Robbie Knops	(Netherlands) Aileen de Graaf	5–0	(England) Suzanne Smith
October 8–9	Klondike Open	Non-ranked	River Cree Resort & Casino	(Canada) Enoch	C$4,500	(Canada) Robbie Mills	bt.	(Canada) Gilbert Jaleco	(Canada) Wenda Carter	bt.	(Canada) Brenda Moreau
October 9	North Island Masters	Bronze	Hastings Darts Association	(New Zealand) Hastings	NZ$3,820	(New Zealand) Johnny Tata	5–2	(New Zealand) Haupai Puha	(New Zealand) Nicole Regnaud	4–3	(New Zealand) Wendy Harper
October 15	N. Ireland Open	Silver	Bellini's	(Northern Ireland) Newry	£8,000	(England) Darren Johnson	5–4	(Wales) Nick Kenny	(England) Lisa Ashton	5–1	(Scotland) Lorraine Hyde
October 16	N. Ireland Matchplay	Silver	Bellini's	(Northern Ireland) Newry	£8,000	(Netherlands) Chris Landman	5–1	(England) Shaun Griffiths	(England) Lisa Ashton	5–3	(England) Lorraine Winstanley
October 16	Bunbury Classic	Silver	South West Italian Club	(Australia) Bunbury	AU$7,180	(Australia) Joe Comito	5–4	(Australia) Kim Lewis	(Australia) Kym Mitchell	4–3	(Australia) Natalie Carter
October 22	Alan King Memorial	Bronze	Otago Darts Association	(New Zealand) Dunedin	NZ$4,220	(New Zealand) Darren Dummigan	5–0	(New Zealand) Graeme Ryder	(New Zealand) Nicole Regnaud	4–0	(New Zealand) Wendy Harper
October 23	The Viking Cup	Silver	indigo at The O2	(England) London	£7,060	(England) Richie Howson	5–2	(Wales) Nick Kenny	(England) Beau Greaves	5–2	(Wales) Rhian O'Sullivan
October 29	Witch City Open	Silver	Courtyard by Marriott	(United States) Nashua	US$6,060	(United States) Danny Lauby	6–1	(United States) Jay Waugh	(United States) Cali West	5–3	(United States) Paula Murphy
October 29	Hungarian Classic	Bronze	Budapest Honvéd Sports Complex	(Hungary) Budapest	HUF1,004,000	(Netherlands) Moreno Blom	5–3	(Slovenia) Benjamin Pratnemer	(Hungary) Veronika Ihász	5–0	(Czech Republic) Jitka Císařová
October 30	Hungarian Masters	Silver	Budapest Honvéd Sports Complex	(Hungary) Budapest	HUF3,251,500	(Czech Republic) Dalibor Šmolík	5–4	(Netherlands) Jeffrey de Graaf	(Netherlands) Aletta Wajer	5–2	(Hungary) Veronika Ihász

=== November ===
Date	Tournament	Cat.	Venue	City	Prize money	Men's			Women's		
Date	Tournament	Cat.	Venue	City	Prize money	winner	score	runner-up	winner	score	runner-up
November 5	Latvia Open	Bronze	Bellevue Park Hotel	(Latvia) Riga	€3,400	(England) Peter Chown	5–1	(Poland) Sebastian Steyer	(Sweden) Maud Jansson	5–3	(Sweden) Anna Forsmark
November 6	Riga Open	Bronze	Bellevue Park Hotel	(Latvia) Riga	€2,720	(Sweden) Dennis Nilsson	5–3	(Sweden) Ricky Nauman	(Sweden) Anna Forsmark	5–2	(Sweden) Susianne Hägvall
November 6	Newcastle Classic	Bronze	Kahibah Sports Club	(Australia) Kahibah	AU$5,020	(Australia) Peter Machin	5–3	(Australia) Danny Porter	(Australia) Kym Mitchell	4–2	(Australia) Melina van den Kieboom
November 9	Malta Masters	Silver	Kirkop Sports Complex	(Malta) Kirkop	€8,000	(Belgium) Philip van Gasse	5–1	(Slovenia) Benjamin Pratnemer	(Netherlands) Anca Zijlstra	5–1	(England) Paula Jacklin
November 10	Malta Open	Silver	Kirkop Sports Complex	(Malta) Kirkop	€8,000	(England) Richard North	5–2	(England) Gary Blackwood	(Netherlands) Aletta Wajer	5–3	(Hungary) Veronika Ihász
November 12	Seacoast Open	Silver	DoubleTree by Hilton	(United States) Andover	$6,000	(United States) Danny Lauby	6–2	(United States) Jason Brandon	(United States) Cali West	6–2	(United States) Marlise Kiel
November 12	Irish Open	Gold	Gleneagle Hotel	(Republic of Ireland) Killarney	€18,400	(Netherlands) Jelle Klaasen	6–3	(Republic of Ireland) Dylan Slevin	(England) Beau Greaves	5–1	(Wales) Rhian O'Sullivan
November 13	Irish Classic	Silver	Gleneagle Hotel	(Republic of Ireland) Killarney	€8,000	(Northern Ireland) Neil Duff	5–4	(Scotland) Gary Stone	(England) Beau Greaves	5–0	(England) Deta Hedman
November 19	Czech Open	Silver	OREA Hotel Pyramida	(Czech Republic) Prague	CZK300,200	(Belgium) Andy Baetens	5–0	(England) Antony Allen	(England) Beau Greaves	5–0	(England) Deta Hedman
November 20	Ted Clements Memorial	Bronze	Levin Cosmopolitan Club	(New Zealand) Levin	NZ$3,000	(New Zealand) Ben Robb	5–1	(New Zealand) Hayden Smith	(New Zealand) Mihi Awatere	4–1	(New Zealand) Victoria Monaghan
November 26	Italian Grand Masters	Silver	Grand Hotel Bologna	(Italy) Pieve di Cento	€8,000	(England) James Hurrell	5–3	(Wales) Nick Kenny	(Netherlands) Priscilla Steenbergen	5–4	(England) Paula Jacklin
November 27	Italian Open	Silver	Grand Hotel Bologna	(Italy) Pieve di Cento	€4,370	(France) Thibault Tricole	5–1	(Italy) Dario Fochesato	(Scotland) Lorraine Hyde	5–3	(Netherlands) Priscilla Steenbergen
November 27	Alice Springs Open	Silver	Gillen Club	(Australia) Gillen	AU$25,510	(Australia) Danny Porter	7–4	(Australia) Trent Reid	(Australia) Kym Mitchell	6–1	(Australia) Chrissy Sheerin

=== December ===
Date	Tournament	Cat.	Venue	City	Prize money	Men's			Women's		
Date	Tournament	Cat.	Venue	City	Prize money	winner	score	runner-up	winner	score	runner-up
December 9–10	World Open	Silver	De Bonte Wever	(Netherlands) Assen	€10,000	(Slovenia) Benjamin Pratnemer	5–3	(Hong Kong) Kai Fan Leung	(Netherlands) Aileen de Graaf	5–1	(England) Natalie Gilbert
December 8–11	World Masters	Platinum	De Bonte Wever	(Netherlands) Assen	€30,000	(Netherlands) Wesley Plaisier	7–2	(Northern Ireland) Barry Copeland	(England) Beau Greaves	6–0	(Spain) Almudena Fajardo
December 12	WDF World Championship Qualifiers; Men's semifinalists (4) and women's finalists (2) qualify for 2023 WDF World Championship	WDF	De Bonte Wever	(Netherlands) Assen	n/a	(Netherlands) Jarno Bottenberg			(Japan) Mayumi Ouchi		
December 12	WDF World Championship Qualifiers; Men's semifinalists (4) and women's finalists (2) qualify for 2023 WDF World Championship	WDF	De Bonte Wever	(Netherlands) Assen	n/a	(Austria) Christian Gödl			(Spain) Almudena Fajardo		
December 12	WDF World Championship Qualifiers; Men's semifinalists (4) and women's finalists (2) qualify for 2023 WDF World Championship	WDF	De Bonte Wever	(Netherlands) Assen	n/a	(Scotland) Shaun McDonald					
December 12	WDF World Championship Qualifiers; Men's semifinalists (4) and women's finalists (2) qualify for 2023 WDF World Championship	WDF	De Bonte Wever	(Netherlands) Assen	n/a	(Netherlands) Arjan Konterman					

=== Tournaments cancelled ===
Following tournaments have been cancelled or postponed until 2023.

Tournaments cancelled/postponed to 2023

Date	Tournament	Cat.	Venue	City	Prize money	Men's			Women's		
Date	Tournament	Cat.	Venue	City	Prize money	winner	score	runner-up	winner	score	runner-up
February 13	~~Quebec Open~~	Bronze	Four Points by Sheraton	(Canada) Lévis	C$1,640						
September 10	~~Bull's German Open~~	Silver	Wunderland Kalkar	(Germany) Kalkar	€18,000						
September 11	~~Bull's Darts Masters~~	Silver	Wunderland Kalkar	(Germany) Kalkar	€18,000						

== Statistical information ==
The players/nations are sorted by:

1. Total number of titles;
2. Cumulated importance of those titles;
3. Alphabetical order (by family names for players).

=== Titles won by player (men's) ===
Total	Player	Category			
Total	Player	Platinum	Gold	Silver	Bronze
5	Danny Lauby (USA)			● ● ●	● ●
4	Neil Duff (NIR)	●		● ●	●
4	James Hurrell (ENG)		●	● ● ●	
4	Ben Robb (NZL)		●	●	● ●
3	Patrik Kovács (HUN)			●	● ●
3	Peter Machin (AUS)				● ● ●
2	Jelle Klaasen (NED)	●	●		
2	Wesley Plaisier (NED)	●		●	
2	Raymond Smith (AUS)	●			●
2	Luke Littler (ENG)		●		●
2	Andy Baetens (BEL)			● ●	
2	Paul Lim (SGP)			● ●	
2	James Richardson (ENG)			● ●	
2	László Kádár (ROM)			●	●
2	Alexander Merkx (NED)			●	●
2	Benjamin Pratnemer (SLO)			●	●
2	Haupai Puha (NZL)			●	●
2	Gábor Takács (HUN)			●	●
2	Johnny Tata (NZL)			●	●
2	Aleksei Kadochnikov (RUS)				● ●
2	John Scott (ENG)				● ●
1	Sebastian Białecki (POL)		●		
1	Reece Colley (ENG)		●		
1	Robert Owen (WAL)		●		
1	Dave Prins (ENG)		●		
1	Joe Comito (AUS)			●	
1	Barry Copeland (NIR)			●	
1	Mal Cuming (AUS)			●	
1	Leonard Gates (USA)			●	
1	Richie Howson (ENG)			●	
1	Darren Johnson (ENG)			●	
1	Jacques Labre (FRA)			●	
1	Chris Landman (NED)			●	
1	Kai Fan Leung (HKG)			●	
1	Jamie Lewis (WAL)			●	
1	Scott Marsh (ENG)			●	
1	Aaron Morrison (AUS)			●	
1	Dennie Olde Kalter (NED)			●	
1	David Pallett (ENG)			●	
1	Danny Porter (AUS)			●	
1	Nick Smith (CAN)			●	
1	Dalibor Šmolík (CZE)			●	
1	Thibault Tricole (FRA)			●	
1	Philip Van Gasse (BEL)			●	
1	Jim Widmayer (USA)			●	
1	Sam Ballinger (AUS)				●
1	Dean Biškupić (CRO)				●
1	Moreno Blom (NED)				●
1	András Borbély (HUN)				●
1	Peter Chown (ENG)				●
1	Mark Cleaver (NZL)				●
1	Darren Dummingan (NZL)				●
1	Kiley Edmunds (CAN)				●
1	Steve Fitzpatrick (AUS)				●
1	Andreas Harrysson (SWE)				●
1	Dustin Holt (USA)				●
1	Patrick Maat (NED)				●
1	Paul Marsh (ENG)				●
1	Jun Matsuda (JPN)				●
1	Shane McGuirk (IRE)				●
1	Dennis Nilsson (SWE)				●
1	Brendan Porter (AUS)				●
1	Henrik Sjöberg (SWE)				●
1	Edwin Torbjörnsson (SWE)				●
1	Keith Way (CAN)				●
1	Brandon Weening (AUS)				●

=== Titles won by nation (men's) ===
Total	Nation	Category			
Total	Nation	Platinum	Gold	Silver	Bronze
18	England (ENG)		● ● ● ●	● ● ● ● ● ● ● ● ●	● ● ● ● ●
13	Australia (AUS)	●		● ● ● ●	● ● ● ● ● ● ● ●
10	Netherlands (NED)	● ●	●	● ● ● ●	● ● ●
10	New Zealand (NZL)		●	● ● ●	● ● ● ● ● ●
8	United States (USA)			● ● ● ● ●	● ● ●
6	Hungary (HUN)			● ●	● ● ● ●
5	Northern Ireland (NIR)	●		● ● ●	●
4	Sweden (SWE)				● ● ● ●
3	Belgium (BEL)			● ● ●	
3	Canada (CAN)			●	● ●
2	Wales (WAL)		●	●	
2	France (FRA)			● ●	
2	Singapore (SGP)			● ●	
2	Romania (ROM)			●	●
2	Slovenia (SLO)			●	●
2	Russia (RUS)				● ●
1	Poland (POL)		●		
1	Czech Republic (CZE)			●	
1	Hong Kong (HKG)			●	
1	Croatia (CRO)				●
1	Ireland (IRE)				●
1	Japan (JPN)				●

=== Titles won by player (women's) ===
Total	Player	Category			
Total	Player	Platinum	Gold	Silver	Bronze
15	Beau Greaves (ENG)	● ● ● ●	● ● ● ●	● ● ● ● ● ● ●	
5	Kym Mitchell (AUS)			● ● ●	● ●
5	Nicole Regnaud (NZL)				● ● ● ● ●
4	Lisa Ashton (ENG)		●	● ● ●	
4	Aileen de Graaf (NED)			● ● ● ●	
4	Anna Forsmark (SWE)				● ● ● ●
3	Wendy Harper (NZL)			● ● ●	
3	Jitka Císarová (CZE)				● ● ●
3	Veronika Ihász (HUN)				● ● ●
3	Maud Jansson (SWE)				● ● ●
2	Deta Hedman (ENG)		● ●		
2	Rhian O'Sullivan (WAL)			● ●	
2	Suzanne Smith (ENG)			● ●	
2	Aletta Wajer (NED)			● ●	
2	Cali West (USA)			● ●	
2	Maria Carli (CAN)			●	●
2	Tori Kewish (AUS)			●	●
2	Mikuru Suzuki (JPN)			●	●
2	Laura Turner (ENG)			●	●
2	Julie Weger (USA)			●	●
2	Margaret Sutton (ENG)				● ●
2	Anca Zijlstra (NED)			● ●	
1	Victoria Monaghan (NZL)		●		
1	Jo Clements (ENG)			●	
1	Lorraine Hyde (SCO)			●	
1	Aaja Jalbert (USA)			●	
1	Paula Murphy (USA)			●	
1	Mayumi Ouchi (JPN)			●	
1	Fallon Sherrock (ENG)			●	
1	Priscilla Steenbergen (NED)			●	
1	Lorraine Winstanley (ENG)			●	
1	Mihi Awatere (NZL)				●
1	Patricia De Peuter (BEL)				●
1	Lee-Ann Faulkner (AUS)				●
1	Karrah Kennedy (CAN)				●
1	Yuliana Khityaeva (RUS)				●
1	Amanda Loch (AUS)				●
1	Ingibjörg Magnúsdóttir (ISL)				●
1	Kristīne Mickus (LAT)				●
1	Brenda Moreau (CAN)				●
1	Tereasa Morris (AUS)				●
1	Diane Nash (ENG)				●
1	Monica Ribeiro (BRA)				●
1	Cassy Scantlen (USA)				●
1	Elena Shulgina (RUS)				●
1	Veronica Simonsen (NOR)				●
1	Melina van den Kieboom (AUS)				●

=== Titles won by nation (women's) ===
Total	Nation	Category			
Total	Nation	Platinum	Gold	Silver	Bronze
31	England (ENG)	● ● ● ●	● ● ● ● ● ● ●	● ● ● ● ● ● ● ● ● ● ● ● ● ● ● ●	● ● ● ●
11	Australia (AUS)			● ● ● ●	● ● ● ● ● ● ●
10	New Zealand (NZL)		●	● ● ●	● ● ● ● ● ●
9	Netherlands (NED)			● ● ● ● ● ● ● ● ●	
7	United States (USA)			● ● ● ● ●	● ●
7	Sweden (SWE)				● ● ● ● ● ● ●
4	Canada (CAN)			●	● ● ●
3	Japan (JPN)			● ●	●
3	Czech Republic (CZE)				● ● ●
3	Hungary (HUN)				● ● ●
2	Wales (WAL)			● ●	
2	Russia (RUS)				● ●
1	Scotland (SCO)			●	
1	Belgium (BEL)				●
1	Brazil (BRA)				●
1	Iceland (ISL)				●
1	Latvia (LAT)				●
1	Norway (NOR)				●

== Rankings ==
Only the best ten points achievements by players in WDF Ranked Tournaments accounts towards the WDF Rankings

Updated to September 5, 2022

=== Men's ===
Rank	Player	Points
1	Neil Duff	777
2	James Hurrell	711
3	Luke Littler	655
4	Thibault Tricole	568
5	Jelle Klaasen	545
6	Scott Marsh	533
7	Haupai Puha	510
8	Mark Barilli	476
9	Raymond Smith	471
10	Andy Baetens	427

=== Women's ===
Rank	Player	Points
1	Beau Greaves	1641
2	Deta Hedman	1190
3	Kirsty Hutchinson	784
4	Anca Zijlstra	710
5	Suzanne Smith	625
6	Jo Clements	565
7	Fallon Sherrock	560
8	Lorraine Winstanley	508
9	Aileen de Graaf	504
10	Rhian O'Sullivan	502
