= Yukie Sakaguchi =

Japanese darts player

Yukie Sakaguchi 坂口優希恵
Personal information
- Nickname: "Yukinyan"
- Born: 19 November 1994 (age 31) Shinagawa, Tokyo, Japan
- Home town: Tokyo, Japan

Sport
- Sport: Darts
- Playing since: 2003
- Darts: 18.5g Tiga Emprechu 5
- Laterality: Right-handed

Organisation (see split in darts)
- PDC: 2021–
- WDF: 2022–
- Current world ranking: (WDF W) 32 (17 August 2026)

WDF major events – best performances
- World Masters: Last 32: 2022
- Australian Open: Last 12: 2022

Other tournament wins
- Years
Bud Brick Memorial	2023
West Japan Cup	2023
Dartslive Japan Ladies	2019 (x2)
SOFT DARTS Ch'ship (U22)	2015, 2017

Yukie Sakaguchi (坂口優希恵, Sakaguchi Yukie; born 19 November 1994) is a Japanese professional soft-tip and steel-tip darts player who plays in Professional Darts Corporation (PDC) and World Darts Federation (WDF) events. Her trademark on the stage is a black necktie. Together with Mikuru Suzuki regularly competes in the PDC Women's Series.

== Career ==
Sakaguchi started playing darts in 2003, at the age of 9. Her first big success was winning two-time the SOFT DARTS Youth Championship for players younger than 22 years old. In the following years, she took part in higher rank tournaments, where in 2019 she won twice in the Dartslive Japan Ladies series.

At the end of October 2021, she made her international debut during the PDC Women's Series held in Barnsley. In her first game on international stage, she beat Jan Robbins by 4–0 in legs. In the second round match she lost to Lisa Ashton by 1–4 in legs. Throughout the weekend of the tournament, she did not advance beyond the third round.

She returned in 2022 for a full 2022 PDC Women's Series season and she plays for the first time in the World Darts Federation tournaments. During the West Japan Open held in May, she advanced to the final where she lost to Mikuru Suzuki by 1–4 in legs. In July, she took part in the Japan Open, but she lost in first phase of the competition to Yoko Tsukui. In early August, she took part in the 2022 Australian Darts Open. After qualifying for the main stage of the tournament, she lost both matches during the group-stage to Mikuru Suzuki and Tori Kewish. A few days later, she competed in the Pacific Masters where she was defeated in the quarter-finals match by Beau Greaves by 1-3 in legs.

At the end of August, for the first time in her career, she advanced to the quarter-finals at the seventh tournament of the 2022 PDC Women's Series held in Hildesheim. In the quarter-finals match, she lost to Lisa Ashton by 2–4 in legs. The next day, she also reached the quarter-finals in both organised tournaments.

== Performance timeline ==
Tournament	2022	2023
WDF Ranked televised events
World Masters	2R	
Australian Open	RR	
