= Yuya Higuchi =

Japanese darts player

Yuya Higuchi 樋口 雄也
Personal information
- Born: 11 November 1976 (age 49) Tokyo, Japan
- Home town: Tokyo, Japan

Sport
- Sport: Darts
- Playing since: 2016
- Darts: 17g Target
- Laterality: Right-handed

Organisation (see split in darts)
- BDO: 2016–2020
- PDC: 2018–2019
- WDF: 2016–
- Current world ranking: (WDF) NR (17 August 2026)

WDF major events – best performances
- World Trophy: Last 32: 2017
- Australian Open: Last 24: 2022

Yuya Higuchi (樋口 雄也, Higuchi Yuya; born 11 November 1976) is a Japanese professional soft-tip and steel-tip darts player who currently plays in World Darts Federation (WDF) events. He took part in the BDO World Trophy and Australian Darts Open. He is famous for his unique dart throwing routine.

== Career ==
Higuchi made his first international appearance at the Japan Open in 2016, where he advanced to the final phase. In 2017, Higuchi qualified as an Asian Qualifier for the 2017 BDO World Trophy, where he lost to Wesley Harms in the first round match by 2–6 in legs. In the same year, he participated in the qualification for the PDC World Darts Championship, but lost to Seigo Asada by 2–5 in legs. As a national player, he represented Japan at the 2017 WDF World Cup. In the individual competition he lost in the first round to Daniel Larsson by 2–4 in legs. In the pairs and team competition he was eliminated at the beginning phase.

From 2018, Higuchi played regularly on the PDC Asia Tour, where there have been three semi-finals so far. He also advanced to the semi-finals at the Japan Open. Higuchi did not play any other international tournaments successfully, even though he sometimes took part in other World Darts Federation events. Due to the coronavirus pandemic, he was not active in international steel-tip tournaments.

In August 2022, Higuchi qualified for the final phase of the 2022 Australian Darts Open. In the group stage he faced Neil Duff and Darren Carson. Against Carson he won by 5–0 in legs and take a first place in the group, but against Duff he ended up lost 3–5 in the legs and was eliminated from the tournament. He also took part in the Pacific Masters, but lost in the first round to Justin Thompson.

== Performance timeline ==
Tournament	2017	2018	2019	2020	2021	2022	2023
WDF Ranked televised events
World Trophy	1R	DNQ		NH			
Australian Open	NH		DNQ	NH		RR	
