= Stef Smith =

Stef Smith may refer to:

- Stef Smith (basketball), player for Cholet Basket
- Stef Smith (darts player), participant in 2022 WDF calendar
- Stef Smith (playwright), Scottish playwright
