= Wales Masters =

Tournament information
- Venue: Lyons Robin Hood Holiday Park
- Location: Rhyl
- Country: Wales
- Established: 2007
- Organisation(s): WDF
- Format: Legs
- Prize fund: £4,200
- Final Year: 2023

Current champion(s)
- (England) James Hurrell (men's) (England) Fallon Sherrock (ladie's) (Wales) Ieuan Halsall (youth)

The Wales Masters was an annual Welsh darts tournament that inaugurated in 2007 until 2019.

== List of tournaments ==
=== Men's ===
Year	Champion	Score	Runner-up	Total Prize Money	Champion	Runner-up
2007	(England) Scott Waites	4–3	(Wales) Phil Evans	£4,200	£2,000	£800
2008	(England) Tony O'Shea	4–1	(Scotland) Mark Barilli	£4,200	£2,000	£800
2009	(England) Dave Chisnall	5–1	(England) Tony O'Shea	£4,200	£2,000	£800
2010	(England) Tony West	5–4	(England) Davy Richardson	£4,200	£2,000	£800
2011	(England) Dean Winstanley	5–3	(England) Darryl Fitton	£4,200	£2,000	£800
2012	(England) Alan Norris	5–2	(England) Gary Stafford	£4,200	£2,000	£800
2013	(England) Darryl Fitton	5–0	(Wales) Steve Alker	£4,200	£2,000	£800
2017	(England) Scott Baker (82.26)	6–5	(Wales) Dean Reynolds (84.87)	£4,200	£2,000	£800
2018	(England) Dave Parletti (87.12)	6–3	(England) Gary Robson (86.73)	£4,200	£2,000	£800
2019	(Wales) Lewy Williams	6–5	(Wales) Mikey Rees	£4,200	£2,000	£800
2022	(England) James Hurrell	6–3	(France) Thibault Tricole	£4,200	£2,000	£800
2023	(Wales) Richard Eirig Rowlands	6–2	(Northern Ireland) Neil Duff	£4,200	£2,000	£800

== See also ==
- List of BDO ranked tournaments
- List of WDF tournaments
