= 2022 Australian Darts Open =

Australian Darts Open

Tournament information
- Dates: 3–6 August 2022
- Venue: Moama Bowling Club
- Location: Moama
- Country: New South Wales; Australia
- Organisation(s): WDF
- Format: Legs
- Prize fund: A$80,000 (total)
- Winner's share: A$16,000 (men's); A$8,000 (women's)

Champion(s)
- Raymond Smith (men's); Beau Greaves (women's)

The 2022 Australian Darts Open was the second edition of the Australian Darts Open organised by Darts Australia. The tournament was held at the Moama Bowling Club in Moama, Australia. Australian Darts Open has been added to the WDF calendar and has been awarded Platinum ranking status, with a total prize fund of A$80,000.

Damon Heta who won the previous men's tournament was absent from the event, having switched to the Professional Darts Corporation in January 2020. Lisa Ashton was defending the women's title as one of the seeded players, but lost in the group-stage match to Nicole Regnaud from New Zealand.

Raymond Smith became the new men's champion and Beau Greaves became the new women's champion.

== Prize money ==
Stage (num. of players)		Prize money	
Stage (num. of players)		Men	Women
Winner	(1)	A$16,000	A$8,000
Runner-up	(1)	A$8,000	A$4,000
Semi-finalists	(2)	A$4,000	A$2,000
Quarter-finalists	(4)	A$2,000	A$1,250
Last 12	(4)	—	A$750
Last 16	(8)	A$1,250	—
Last 24	(8)	A$750	—
Total		A$80,000	

== Men's ==
=== Format and qualifiers ===
Qualifying criteria is as follows:

1. 2022 Lakeside Men's World Champion (seeded)
2. Two best players from World men's ranking (seeded)
3. Three best players from Australia men's ranking (seeded)
4. Two best players from New Zealand men's ranking (seeded)
5. Eight qualifiers from the state qualifiers (Australian Capital Territory, New South Wales, Northern Territory, Queensland, South Australia, Tasmania, Victoria, Western Australia)
6. Eight qualifiers from open qualification tournaments in Moama, Australia on 3–4 August 2022

The final 24 men will be drawn into groups of 3 and will compete upon the stage.

Seeded players

1. Neil Duff (semi-finals)
2. Jelle Klaasen (Note: James Hurrell (#1 in WDF World Men's Ranking) withdrew due to cost issues. He was replaced by Jelle Klaasen (#8 in WDF World Men's Ranking).) (quarter-finals)
3. Haupai Puha (runner-up)
4. Raymond Smith (champion)
5. Peter Machin (quarter-finals)
6. Jeremy Fagg (group stage)
7. Mal Cuming (Note: Luke Littler (#2 in WDF World Men's Ranking) withdrew due to cost issues. He was replaced by Mal Cuming (#4 in WDF Australia Men's Ranking).) (group stage)
8. Sam Ballinger (Note: Ben Robb (#2 in WDF New Zealand Men's Ranking) withdrew. He was replaced by Sam Ballinger (#5 in WDF Australia Men's Ranking).) (quarter-finals)

State qualifiers

- Darren Carson (group stage)
- Donovan Lottering (group stage)
- Aaron Morrison (group stage)
- David Platt (group stage)
- Jamie Rundle (group stage)
- Ky Smith (group stage)
- Leon Towns (group stage)
- Brandon Weening (group stage)

Open qualifiers

- Michael Cassar (group stage)
- Mitchell Clegg (quarter-finals)
- Scott Hallett (semi-finals)
- Yuya Higuchi (group stage)
- Cory Lloyd (group stage)
- Liam McDonell (group stage)
- Danny Porter (group stage)
- Justin Thompson (group stage)

=== Group stage ===
All group matches are best of nine legs
Only winners in each group qualify for the knock-out stage

NB: P = Played; W = Won; L = Lost; LF = Legs for; LA = Legs against; +/− = Plus/minus record, in relation to legs; Pts = Points; Status = Qualified to knockout stage

==== Group A ====
Standings Table
Pos.	Player	P	W	L	LF	LA	+/−	Pts	Status
1	Neil Duff (1)	2	2	0	10	3	+7	2	Q
2	Yuya Higuchi	2	1	1	8	5	+3	1	Eliminated
3	Darren Carson	2	0	2	0	10	-10	0	Eliminated

4 August

Neil Duff 92.77	5–0	Darren Carson 52.65

5 August

Darren Carson 61.21	0–5	Yuya Higuchi 85.40
Yuya Higuchi 84.38	3–5	Neil Duff 90.40

==== Group B ====
Standings Table
Pos.	Player	P	W	L	LF	LA	+/−	Pts	Status
1	Sam Ballinger (8)	2	1	1	8	7	+1	1	Q
2	Liam McDonell	2	1	1	7	7	0	1	Eliminated
3	Donovan Lottering	2	1	1	7	8	-1	1	Eliminated

4 August

Sam Ballinger 76.50	3–5	Donovan Lottering 76.82

5 August

Donovan Lottering 66.74	2–5	Liam McDonell 65.09
Liam McDonell 68.53	2–5	Sam Ballinger 82.78

==== Group C ====
Standings Table
Pos.	Player	P	W	L	LF	LA	+/−	Pts	Status
1	Peter Machin (5)	2	2	0	10	3	+7	2	Q
2	Justin Thompson	2	1	1	7	7	0	1	Eliminated
3	Leon Towns	2	0	2	3	10	-7	0	Eliminated

4 August

Peter Machin 84.96	5–1	Leon Towns 62.34

5 August

Leon Towns 75.53	2–5	Justin Thompson 87.97
Justin Thompson 77.81	2–5	Peter Machin 89.92

==== Group D ====
Standings Table
Pos.	Player	P	W	L	LF	LA	+/−	Pts	Status
1	Raymond Smith (4)	2	2	0	10	5	+5	2	Q
2	Danny Porter	2	1	1	8	8	0	1	Eliminated
3	Ky Smith	2	0	2	5	10	-5	0	Eliminated

4 August

Raymond Smith 86.40	5–2	Ky Smith 73.82

5 August

Ky Smith 74.44	3–5	Danny Porter 81.18
Danny Porter 79.49	3–5	Raymond Smith 79.17

==== Group E ====
Standings Table
Pos.	Player	P	W	L	LF	LA	+/−	Pts	Status
1	Haupai Puha (3)	2	2	0	10	0	+10	2	Q
2	Aaron Morrison	2	1	1	5	7	-2	1	Eliminated
3	Michael Cassar	2	0	2	2	10	-8	0	Eliminated

4 August

Haupai Puha 90.54	5–0	Aaron Morrison 82.96

5 August

Aaron Morrison 77.91	5–2	Michael Cassar 67.33
Michael Cassar 72.19	0–5	Haupai Puha 80.81

==== Group F ====
Standings Table
Pos.	Player	P	W	L	LF	LA	+/−	Pts	Status
1	Mitchell Clegg	2	2	0	10	6	+4	2	Q
2	Jeremy Fagg (6)	2	1	1	8	5	+3	1	Eliminated
3	Brandon Weening	2	0	2	3	10	-7	0	Eliminated

4 August

Jeremy Fagg 79.11	5–0	Brandon Weening 69.19

5 August

Brandon Weening 71.45	3–5	Mitchell Clegg 76.13
Mitchell Clegg 81.99	5–3	Jeremy Fagg 82.68

==== Group G ====
Standings Table
Pos.	Player	P	W	L	LF	LA	+/−	Pts	Status
1	Scott Hallett	2	2	0	10	4	+6	2	Q
2	Mal Cuming (7)	2	1	2	8	9	-1	1	Eliminated
3	Jamie Rundle	2	0	2	5	10	-5	0	Eliminated

4 August

Mal Cuming 73.51	5–4	Jamie Rundle 75.64

5 August

Jamie Rundle 73.17	1–5	Scott Hallett 82.29
Scott Hallett 82.22	5–3	Mal Cuming 76.67

==== Group H ====
Standings Table
Pos.	Player	P	W	L	LF	LA	+/−	Pts	Status
1	Jelle Klaasen (2)	2	2	0	10	5	+5	2	Q
2	David Platt	2	1	1	9	7	+2	1	Eliminated
3	Cory Lloyd	2	0	2	3	10	-7	0	Eliminated

4 August

Jelle Klaasen 88.57	5–4	David Platt 87.06

5 August

David Platt 87.03	5–2	Cory Lloyd 80.85
Cory Lloyd 81.34	1–5	Jelle Klaasen 95.43

=== Knockout stage ===
Quarter-finals (best of 11 legs); 6 August
A1	Neil Duff 81.99	6
B1	Sam Ballinger 82.59	3
C1	Peter Machin 84.00	2
D1	Raymond Smith 83.91	6
E1	Haupai Puha 88.77	6
F1	Mitchell Clegg 88.97	4
G1	Scott Hallett 83.85	6
H1	Jelle Klaasen 88.18	5

Semi-finals (best of 15 legs); 6 August
A1	Neil Duff 84.85	6
D1	Raymond Smith 83.55	8
E1	Haupai Puha 90.62	8
G1	Scott Hallett 84.20	6

Final (best of 19 legs); 6 August
D1	Raymond Smith 93.33	10
E1	Haupai Puha 90.22	9

== Women's ==
=== Format and qualifiers ===
Qualifying criteria is as follows:

1. 2022 Lakeside Women's World Champion (seeded)
2. Best player from World Women's Ranking (seeded)
3. 2019 Australian Darts Open finalists (seeded)
4. Two best players from Australia Women's Ranking
5. Two best players from New Zealand Women's Ranking
6. Four qualifiers from open qualification tournaments in Moama, Australia on 3–4 August 2022

The final 12 women will be drawn into groups of 3 and will compete upon the stage.

Seeded players

1. Beau Greaves (champion)
2. Kirsty Hutchinson (Note: Deta Hedman (#2 in WDF World Women's Ranking) withdrew due to cost issues. She was replaced by Kirsty Hutchinson (#3 in WDF World Women's Ranking).) (group stage)
3. Mikuru Suzuki (runner-up)
4. Lisa Ashton (group stage)

Rankings qualifiers

- Wendy Harper (semi-finals)
- Tori Kewish (group stage)
- Amanda Loch (group stage)
- Nicole Regnaud (semi-finals)

Open qualifiers

- Desi Mercer (group stage)
- Kym Mitchell (group stage)
- Abbey Morrison (group stage)
- Yukie Sakaguchi (group stage)

=== Group stage ===
All group matches are best of seven legs
Only winners in each group qualify for the knock-out stage

NB: P = Played; W = Won; L = Lost; LF = Legs for; LA = Legs against; +/− = Plus/minus record, in relation to legs; Pts = Points; Status = Qualified to knockout stage

==== Group A ====
Standings Table
Pos.	Player	P	W	L	LF	LA	+/−	Pts	Status
1	Beau Greaves (1)	2	2	0	8	0	+8	2	Q
2	Amanda Loch	2	1	1	4	4	0	1	Eliminated
3	Desi Mercer	2	0	2	0	8	-8	0	Eliminated

4 August

Beau Greaves 75.15	4–0	Amanda Loch 58.85

5 August

Amanda Loch 71.57	4–0	Desi Mercer 68.81
Desi Mercer 61.84	0–4	Beau Greaves 75.15

==== Group B ====
Standings Table
Pos.	Player	P	W	L	LF	LA	+/−	Pts	Status
1	Wendy Harper	2	2	0	8	2	+6	2	Q
2	Kym Mitchell	2	1	1	6	7	-1	1	Eliminated
3	Kirsty Hutchinson (2)	2	0	2	3	8	-5	0	Eliminated

4 August

Kirsty Hutchinson 56.00	0–4	Wendy Harper 66.80

5 August

Wendy Harper 65.93	4–2	Kym Mitchell 61.66
Kym Mitchell 67.27	4–3	Kirsty Hutchinson 68.16

==== Group C ====
Standings Table
Pos.	Player	P	W	L	LF	LA	+/−	Pts	Status
1	Mikuru Suzuki (4)	2	2	0	8	2	+6	2	Q
2	Tori Kewish	2	1	1	4	6	-2	1	Eliminated
3	Yukie Sakaguchi	2	0	2	4	8	-4	0	Eliminated

4 August

Mikuru Suzuki 72.43	4–0	Tori Kewish 63.59

5 August

Tori Kewish 64.78	4–2	Yukie Sakaguchi 61.14
Yukie Sakaguchi 74.24	2–4	Mikuru Suzuki 77.36

==== Group D ====
Standings Table
Pos.	Player	P	W	L	LF	LA	+/−	Pts	Status
1	Nicole Regnaud	2	2	0	8	4	+4	2	Q
2	Lisa Ashton (3)	2	1	1	6	4	+2	1	Eliminated
3	Abbey Morrison	2	0	2	2	8	-6	0	Eliminated

4 August

Lisa Ashton 84.89	2–4	Nicole Regnaud 86.91

5 August

Nicole Regnaud 60.29	4–2	Abbey Morrison 57.35
Abbey Morrison 60.00	0–4	Lisa Ashton 78.08

=== Knockout stage ===
Semi-finals (best of 11 legs); 6 August
A1	Beau Greaves 84.74	6
D1	Nicole Regnaud 73.73	3
B1	Wendy Harper 65.10	2
C1	Mikuru Suzuki 75.42	6

Final (best of 15 legs); 6 August
A1	Beau Greaves 91.27	8
C1	Mikuru Suzuki 89.46	5
