= Mitchell Clegg =

Australian darts player (born 1990)

Personal information
- Nickname: "The Moosta"
- Born: 12 November 1990 (age 35) Mayfield, New South Wales, Australia
- Home town: Newcastle, New South Wales, Australia

Sport
- Sport: Darts
- Playing since: 2004
- Darts: 25g Harrows Steve Duke Signature
- Laterality: Right-handed
- Walk-on music: "TNT" by AC/DC

Organisation (see split in darts)
- BDO: 2006–2020
- PDC: 2007
- WDF: 2006–

WDF major events – best performances
- Australian Open: Quarter-final: 2019, 2022

PDC premier events – best performances
- World Championship: Last 64: 2007

Other tournament wins
- Years
DPA Australian Matchplay	2010
DPA New South Wales Bubble	2021 (x3), 2022
Oceanic Masters	2006
Medal record
Men's Darts
Representing Australia
WDF Asia-Pacific Cup
Gold medal – first place	2014 Hong Kong	Men's pairs
Bronze medal – third place	2014 Hong Kong	Team event
Bronze medal – third place	2018 Seoul	Men's pairs
Bronze medal – third place	2018 Seoul	Team event

Mitchell Clegg (born 12 November 1990) is an Australian professional darts player. He lives in Newcastle, New South Wales. In September 2006, Clegg won the Oceanic Masters title at the age of just 15 years, 345 days, becoming the youngest player ever to qualify for the PDC World Darts Championship.

His debut at the 2007 PDC World Championship ended in the first round with a 0–3 defeat to Raymond van Barneveld who went on to win his fifth world title.

After his World Championship experience, Clegg competed in the AGP tour affiliated with the PDC as well as competing in WDF ranked events in Oceania but has failed to gain much success thus far. He reached the final of the 2009 Central Coast Australian Classic but lost 6–0 in the final to Anthony Fleet.

== World Championship results ==
=== PDC ===
- 2007: Last 64: (lost to Raymond van Barneveld 0–3) (sets)
