= Korean Open (darts) =

South Korean darts tournament

Tournament information
- Venue: Merigold Hotel
- Location: Seoul
- Country: South Korea
- Established: 2007
- Organisation(s): KDF; WDF, Gold category
- Format: Legs
- Prize fund: KRW 1,700,000
- Month(s) Played: October

Current champion(s)
- (South Korea) Kwang-Hee Cho (Men's) (South Korea) Hye-Jin Choi (Women's)

The Korean Open is a darts tournament that has been held since 2007.

== List of winners ==
=== Men's ===
Year	Champion	Score	Runner-up	Total Prize Money	Champion	Runner-up
2008	(Philippines) Ramon Sabalboro	beat	(South Korea) Seung-Youb Nam	KRW 1,000,000	KRW 500,000	KRW 200,000
2009	(Philippines) Ronald L. Briones	beat	(Philippines) Lourence Ilagan	KRW 1,000,000	KRW 500,000	KRW 200,000
2010	(Japan) Daisuke Takeyama	beat	(South Korea) Byung-Koo Kang	KRW 1,000,000	KRW 500,000	KRW 200,000
2011	(Japan) Kuwatori Kengo	beat	(South Korea) Seong-Hoo Baek	KRW 1,000,000	KRW 500,000	KRW 200,000
2012	(South Korea) Kodo	beat	(South Korea) Jun-Ho Kim	KRW 1,000,000	KRW 500,000	KRW 200,000
2016	(South Korea) Woong-Hee Han	5 – 2	(South Korea) Taek-Yung Lee	KRW 1,000,000	KRW 500,000	KRW 200,000
2017	(Mongolia) Odkhuu Khundaganai	beat	(South Korea) Kyoung-Won Cho	KRW 1,000,000	KRW 500,000	KRW 200,000
2018	(South Korea) Byung-Su Seo	4 – 2	(New Zealand) Ben Robb	KRW 1,700,000	KRW 1,000,000	KRW 500,000
2019	(South Korea) Kwang-Hee Cho	beat	(South Korea) Byung-Su Seo	KRW 1,700,000	KRW 1,000,000	KRW 500,000
2023				TBA	TBA	TBA

=== Women's ===
Year	Champion	Score	Runner-up	Total Prize Money	Champion	Runner-up
2011	(South Korea) Nam-Mee Kim	beat	(South Korea) Bo-Ram Park	KRW 500,000	KRW 300,000	KRW 200,000
2012	(South Korea) Bo-Ram Park	beat	(United States) Bridget Werner	KRW 500,000	KRW 300,000	KRW 200,000
2016	(South Korea) Suk-Hee Song	3 – 1	(Hong Kong) Rain Wong	KRW 500,000	KRW 300,000	KRW 200,000
2017	(China) Momo Zhou	beat	(South Korea) A-Reum Kim	KRW 500,000	KRW 300,000	KRW 200,000
2018	(Japan) Mikuru Suzuki	4 – 3	(Australia) Tori Kewish	KRW 850,000	KRW 250,000	KRW 100,000
2019	(South Korea) Hye-Jin Choi	beat	(South Korea) Yun-Ji Kim	KRW 850,000	KRW 250,000	KRW 100,000
2023				TBA	TBA	TBA
