= Pacific Masters (darts) =

Tournament information
- Venue: Gary Holland Community Centre
- Location: Rockingham, Western Australia
- Country: Australia
- Established: 1978
- Organisation(s): WDF Gold category
- Month(s) Played: August

Current champion(s)
- (Northern Ireland) Neil Duff (men's) (England) Lisa Ashton (women's)

The Pacific Masters is a darts tournament that has been held annually since 1978.

== List of winners ==
=== Men's ===
Year	Champion (average in final)	Score	Runner-up (average in final)	Total Prize Money	Champion	Runner-up
1978	(Australia) Barry Atkinson	?-?	(Australia) Andy Robinson	?	?	?
1979	(New Zealand) Bill Rose	?-?	(New Zealand) Tubby Heze	?	?	?
1980	(Australia) John Burnett	?-?	(Australia) Andy Robinson	?	?	?
1981	(England) Eric Bristow	?-?	(Australia) Terry O'Dea	?	?	?
1982	(Australia) David Crack	?-?	(Australia) Tim Brown	?	?	?
1983	(Australia) Russell Stewart	?-?	(Australia) Kevin White	?	?	?
1984	(Australia) Russell Stewart	?-?	(Australia) Horrie Seden	?	?	?
1985	(England) John Lowe	?-?	(England) Eric Bristow	?	?	?
1986	(England) Eric Bristow		(Australia) Barry Wilkshire	?	?	?
1987	(England) Bob Anderson	?-?	(Australia) Frank Palko	?	?	?
1988	(England) Bob Anderson	?-?	(Australia) Bruce Matthews	?	?	?
1989	(England) Bob Anderson	?-?	(Australia) Russell Stewart	?	?	?
1990	(Australia) Russell Stewart	?-?	(Australia) Tony Glass	?	?	?
1991	(Australia) Keith Sullivan	?-?	(Australia) Bruce Matthews	?	?	?
1992	(England) Dennis Priestley	?-?	(Australia) Frank Tarr	?	?	?
1993	(England) Shayne Burgess	?-?	(Australia) Wayne Weening	?	?	?
1994	(Australia) Peter Hinkley	?-?	(Australia) Wayne Weening	?	?	?
1995	(Australia) Darren Webster	?-?	(Australia) Roger Gibbs	?	?	?
1996	(Australia) Peter Hinkley	?-?	(Australia) Tony David	?	?	?
1997	(Wales) Sean Palfrey	?-?	(Australia) Wayne Weening	?	?	?
1998	(Australia) Steve Duke	?-?	(Australia) Tony David	?	?	?
1999	(Australia) Graham Hunt	?-?	(England) Andy Jenkins	?	?	?
2000	(Australia) Darryl Curley	?-?	(Australia) Fred Cadby	?	?	?
2001	(Australia) Wayne Weening	?-?	(Australia) Steve Duke	?	?	?
2002	(Australia) Owen McArthur	?-?	(Australia) Brian Roach	?	?	?
2003	(Australia) Tony David	?-?	(Australia) Steve Duke	?	?	?
2004	(Australia) Simon Whitlock (89.73)	6-3	(Australia) Graham Hunt (84.06)	A$2,500	A$1,100	A$600
2005	(Netherlands) Raymond van Barneveld	?-?	(Scotland) Paul Hanvidge	?	?	?
2006	(Australia) Simon Whitlock (111.99)	6-1	(Australia) Anthony Fleet (90.54)	A$2,500	?	?
2007	(Australia) Ian Brown	?-?	(Australia) Russell Stewart	A$2,500	A$1,100	A$600
2008	(Australia) Simon Whitlock	6-2	(Australia) Anthony Fleet	A$2,500	A$1,100	A$600
2009	(Australia) Anthony Fleet (82.17)	6-2	(Australia) Neil Hembrow (75.75)	A$2,500	A$1,100	A$600
2010	(Australia) Beau Anderson (83.91)	6-4	(Australia) Bill Stanley (75.63)	A$2,500	A$1,100	A$600
2011	(Australia) Damon Heta	def.	(Australia) Andrew Townes			
2012	(Australia) Rob Modra	def.	(Australia) Justin Miles			
2013	(Australia) Chris Vasey	def.	(Australia) Stuart Leach			
2014	(Australia) Tony Pettit	6–5	(Australia) Eddy Sims			
2015	(Australia) Peter Machin	def.	(Australia) Raymond O'Donnell			
2016	(Australia) Adam Rowe	def.	(Australia) Raymond Smith			
2017	(Australia) Andrew Townes	def.	(Australia) Peter Machin	?	?	?
2018	(Australia) Peter Machin	6–1	(Australia) David Platt	?	?	?
2019	(Australia) Peter Machin	7–6	(Australia) Brad Thorp	?	?	?
2022	(Northern Ireland) Neil Duff	6-2	(New Zealand) Haupai Puha	A$5,600	A$1,600	A$800
2023	(Australia) Raymond Smith	6-5	(Belgium) Andy Baetens	A$5,600	A$1,600	A$800
2024	(Australia) Brandon Weening	6-3	(Australia) Scott Hallett	A$5,600	A$1,600	A$800
2025	(New Zealand) Ben Robb	6-1	(Australia) Raymond Smith	A$5,600	A$1,600	A$800

=== Ladies ===
Year	Champion	Score	Runner-up	Total Prize Money	Champion	Runner-up
1979	(New Zealand) Lottie Chalcroft	?-?	(Australia) Judy Martin	?	?	?
1980	(Australia) Ivy Hampton	?-?	(Australia) Cherry Bradshaw	?	?	?
1981	(New Zealand) Jill MacDonald	?-?	(Australia) Selly Tain	?	?	?
1982	(Australia) Barbara Fletcher	?-?	(England) Linda Batten	?	?	?
1983	(Australia) Eileen Wilson	?-?	(England) Maureen Flowers	?	?	?
1984	(New Zealand) Lilian Barnett	?-?	(England) Sonja Ralphs	?	?	?
1985	(England) Linda Batten	?-?	(England) Maureen Flowers	?	?	?
1986	(England) Maureen Flowers	?-?	(England) Sharon Colclough	?	?	?
1987	(England) Sue Edwards	?-?	(Australia) Ellen Grieg	?	?	?
1988	(Australia) Pauline Munday	?-?	(United States) Lori Verrier	?	?	?
1989	(England) Mandy Solomons	?-?	(Australia) Lee-Ann Faulkner	?	?	?
1990	(Australia) Janice Girdler	4-3	(England) Trina Gulliver	?	?	?
1991	(Australia) Charmaine Barney	?-?	(England) Mandy Solomons	?	?	?
1992	(United States) Kathy Maloney	?-?	(Australia) Carol Forwood	?	?	?
1993	(Australia) Kym Mitchell	?-?	(Jamaica) Deta Hedman	?	?	?
1994	(Jamaica) Deta Hedman	?-?	(Australia) Carol Forwood	?	?	?
1995	(Australia) Carol Forwood	?-?	(England) Tricia Wright	?	?	?
1996	(Australia) Joyce Mackie	?-?	(Australia) Carol Forwood	?	?	?
1997	(England) Trina Gulliver	?-?	(England) Crissy Manley	?	?	?
1998	(Australia) Dot McLeod	?-?	(England) Crissy Manley	?	?	?
1999	(Australia) Kath Berecz	?-?	(England) Mandy Solomons	?	?	?
2000	(Australia) Dot McLeod	?-?	(Australia) Sandra Smith	?	?	?
2001	(Australia) Louise Ball	?-?	(Australia) Kerry Jacobs-Slattery	?	?	?
2002	(Australia) Nancy Homer	?-?	(Australia) Carol Forwood	?	?	?
2003	(Australia) Carol Forwood	?-?	(Australia) Kerry Jacobs-Slattery	?	?	?
2004	(Australia) Louise Ball	?-?	(Australia) Brie Peters	?	?	?
2005	(Scotland) Anne Kirk	?-?	(Australia) Carol Forwood	?	?	?
2006	(Australia) Dot McLeod	?-?	(Australia) Christine Woolley	?	?	?
2007	(Australia) Natalie Carter	?-?	(Australia) Louise Ball	?	?	?
2008	(Australia) Cathy Shaw	?-?	(Australia) Corrine Hammond	?	?	?
2009	(Australia) Carol Forwood	?-?	(Australia) Pam Burr	?	?	?
2010	(Australia) Helen Johnston	?-?	(Australia) Christine Woolley	?	?	?
2011	(Australia) Pam Burr	4-0	(Australia) Carol Forwood	?	?	?
2012	(Australia) Carol Forwood	4-3	(Australia) Natalie Carter	?	?	?
2013	(Australia) Lorraine Burn	?-?	(Australia) Corrine Hammond	?	?	?
2014	(Australia) Linda Dobbin	?-?	(Australia) Janine Casser	?	?	?
2015	(Australia) Lorraine Burn	?-?	(New Zealand) Christine Sheerin	?	?	?
2016	(Australia) Lee-Anne Watkins	4-2	(Australia) Ashley Charchalis	?	?	?
2017	(Australia) Tori Kewish	5-0	(Australia) Pam Burr	?	?	?
2018	(Australia) Tori Kewish	?-?	(Australia) Kym Kelly	?	?	?
2019	(Japan) Mikuru Suzuki	5-3	(England) Lisa Ashton	?	?	?
2022	(England) Lisa Ashton	5-1	(Australia) Tori Kewish	A$4,800	A$1,600	A$800
2023	(England) Lisa Ashton	5-1	(Australia) Angela Clarke	A$4,800	A$1,600	A$800
2024	(Australia) Jules Taylor	5-2	(Australia) Andrea Hendley	A$4,800	A$1,600	A$800
2025	(Australia) Joanne Hadley	5-1	(Australia) Tori Kewish	A$5,600	A$1,600	A$800
