= János Simon Basketball Arena =

Indoor arena in Budapest, Hungary

- Interactive map of János Simon Basketball Arena
- Former names: Tüzér Street Arena
- Location: Budapest, Hungary
- Coordinates: 47°31′17″N 19°4′5″E
- Capacity: 1200 seats
- Surface: Parquet
- Field size: 15 x 28 m

Tenant
- Budapesti Honvéd SE

The János Simon Basketball Arena (Hungarian: Simon János Kosárlabda Csarnok) is an indoor basketball arena in Budapest, Hungary. Primarily used for basketball, it is the home arena of Budapesti Honvéd SE. Since 2012 it bears the name of former European champion basketball player János Simon, who played for and later coached Budapesti Honvéd.
