= Lisa Ashton =

English darts player (born 1970)

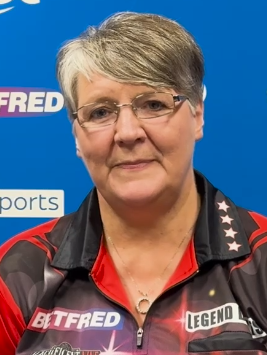
- Ashton at the 2025 Women's World Matchplay

Personal information
- Nickname: "The Lancashire Rose"
- Born: 27 August 1970 (age 56) Bolton, Lancashire, England

Sport
- Sport: Darts
- Playing since: 1992
- Darts: 24g Legend
- Laterality: Right-handed
- Walk-on music: "On a Mission" by Gabriella Cilmi

Organisation (see split in darts)
- BDO: 2007–2020
- PDC: 2019–present (Tour Card: 2020–2021)
- WDF: 2007–2020, 2022–2024, 2026
- Current world ranking: (PDC) NR (5 November 2026)

WDF major events – best performances
- World Championship: Winner (4): 2014, 2015, 2017, 2018
- World Masters: Winner (3): 2011, 2018, 2019
- World Trophy: Winner (3): 2015, 2016, 2019
- Finder Masters: Winner (2): 2008, 2018
- Australian Open: Winner (2): 2019, 2023
- Dutch Open: Winner (1): 2016

PDC premier events – best performances
- World Championship: Last 96: 2019, 2021, 2022, 2023
- UK Open: Last 96: 2021
- Grand Slam: Group Stage: 2019, 2020, 2021, 2022, 2025, 2026

WSDT major events – best performances
- World Championship: Semi-final: 2024
- World Matchplay: Quarter-final: 2022, 2024
- World Masters: Last 16: 2024

Other tournament wins
- Years
Women's World Matchplay	2025
PDC Women's Series (×20)	2020 (×2), 2021 (×5), 2022 (×7), 2023 (×1), 2024 (×2), 2025 (×1), 2026 (×2)
Medal record
Women's Darts
Representing England
WDF World Cup
Gold medal – first place	2009 Charlotte	Women's pairs
Gold medal – first place	2009 Charlotte	Women's overall
Gold medal – first place	2015 Antalya	Women's singles
Gold medal – first place	2015 Antalya	Women's pairs
Gold medal – first place	2015 Antalya	Women's team
Gold medal – first place	2015 Antalya	Women's overall
WDF Europe Cup
Gold medal – first place	2014 Bucharest	Women's team
Gold medal – first place	2014 Bucharest	Women's overall
Silver medal – second place	2008 Copenhagen	Women's singles
Bronze medal – third place	2010 Kemer	Women's singles
Bronze medal – third place	2010 Kemer	Women's pairs
Representing United Kingdom
EDF European Ch'ship
Gold medal – first place	2022 Podčetrtek	Women's singles

Lisa Ashton (born 27 August 1970) is an English professional darts player who competes in both Professional Darts Corporation (PDC) and World Darts Federation (WDF) events and previously competed in British Darts Organisation (BDO) events. She is a four-time BDO Women's World Champion. She won the Women's World Matchplay in 2025 and has won 20 PDC Women's Series titles. She held a PDC Tour Card from 2020 to 2021, having become the first woman to win a tour card at Q-School.

Nicknamed "the Lancashire Rose", Ashton topped the Women's Series rankings in 2020 and 2022. She is a three-time World Masters champion and a three-time winner of the BDO World Trophy.

== Career ==
Ashton reached the quarter-finals of the 2007 Women's World Masters, beating Heike Jenkins (Ernst) in the last 16 before losing to Rilana Erades. The next year, she reached the semi-finals, defeating Anne Kirk in the last 16 and then beat Cathy Shaw, before losing to eventual winner Francis Hoenselaar.

Ashton then won the 2008 Women's Zuiderduin Masters, beating Trina Gulliver in the final. Ashton qualified for the 2009 Women's World Championship and made her debut at the event. She met Gulliver once more in the quarter-finals but was beaten 2–0. In 2010, Ashton advanced to the semi-finals of the Winmau World Masters, where she lost to Francis Hoenselaar 4–2. In 2011, Ashton defeated Gulliver 4–1 to win the Winmau World Masters. Ashton reached the final of the 2013 BDO World Darts Championship, after defeating both Deta Hedman and Sharon Prins 2–0, before she eventually lost to Anastasia Dobromyslova 2–1.

Ashton hit ten 180s on her way to winning the 2014 BDO World Darts Championship at the Lakeside Country Club, which had 16 women qualifiers for the first time in its history. She defeated Aileen de Graaf in the first round, which went to a sudden-death deciding leg. She then defeated Tamara Schuur in the quarter-finals, and Dobromyslova in the semi-finals, surviving six match darts, before beating Hedman in the final, 3–2. She successfully defended her title in 2015 with a 3–1 win over Fallon Sherrock. Ashton then won the BDO World Trophy, by defeating Dobromyslova in the final. At the Winmau World Masters, she lost in the final to de Graaf after missing six match darts.

At the 2016 BDO World Darts Championship, Ashton was beaten 2–1 by Gulliver in the quarter-finals. At the 2016 BDO World Trophy, she hit a record three-dart average for a televised women's match of 98.85. In the 2017 BDO World Darts Championship, both Ashton and Corrine Hammond reached the final without losing a set. Ashton won the final 3–0. Ashton won the 2018 BDO World Darts Championship after she beat Dobromyslova 3–1 in the final. This was her fourth World Championship title in five years. Ashton entered the 2019 PDC Qualifying School. She missed out on getting a tour card by one point.

After losing out in the final of the 2020 BDO World Darts Championship to defending champion Mikuru Suzuki, Ashton became the first woman to win a PDC Tour Card through Q-School, by finishing in twelfth place on the UK Q-School Order of Merit. On 5 March 2021, she became the first female to win a match at the UK Open since 2005, defeating Aaron Beeney 6–2 in the second round of the 2021 UK Open, and, also setting a new world record for the highest average of 100.3, on TV, by a female player in her victory.

In the 2022 PDC World Darts Championship, she lost 3–0 to Ron Meulenkamp in the first round and also lost her PDC Tour Card. She failed to win it back at Q School. In February, she played in the 2022 World Seniors Darts Championship and received a bye into the second round, where she lost 1–3 by sets to Terry Jenkins. Ashton qualified for the 2022 Women's World Matchplay by being in the top eight in the PDC Women's Series after twelve events. She beat Chloe O'Brien 4–0 in the quarter-finals but lost 5–4 to de Graaf in the semi-finals. Ashton played at the 2023 PDC World Championship, and was defeated in the first round by Ryan Meikle 3–2.

In 2025, Ashton won the Women's World Matchplay for the first time; she defeated Robyn Byrne, Beau Greaves and Fallon Sherrock en route. At the 2025 Grand Slam of Darts, she took a 4–3 lead against European champion Gian van Veen in her opening group stage match. She lost the match in a deciding leg, and was eliminated from the tournament following losses to Josh Rock and Wessel Nijman. At the 2026 PDC World Championship, Ashton lost 3–0 to Michael Smith in the first round.

== Personal life ==
Ashton's daughters Danielle and Lindsey both play darts. In 2018, all three entered the 2019 PDC World Championship Qualifiers.

== World Championship results ==
=== BDO World Championship ===
- 2009: Quarter-final (lost to Trina Gulliver 0–2)
- 2012: Quarter-final (lost to Trina Gulliver 0–2)
- 2013: Runner-up (lost to Anastasia Dobromyslova 1–2)
- 2014: Winner (beat Deta Hedman 3–2)
- 2015: Winner (beat Fallon Sherrock 3–1)
- 2016: Quarter-final (lost to Trina Gulliver 1–2)
- 2017: Winner (beat Corrine Hammond 3–0)
- 2018: Winner (beat Anastasia Dobromyslova 3–1)
- 2019: First round (lost to Mikuru Suzuki 0–2)
- 2020: Runner-up (lost to Mikuru Suzuki 0–3)

=== WDF World Championship ===
- 2023: Semi-final (lost to Aileen de Graaf 1–3)
- 2024: First round (lost to Sophie McKinlay 1–2)

=== PDC World Championship ===
- 2019: First round (lost to Jan Dekker 1–3)
- 2021: First round (lost to Adam Hunt 2–3)
- 2022: First round (lost to Ron Meulenkamp 0–3)
- 2023: First round (lost to Ryan Meikle 2–3)
- 2026: First round (lost to Michael Smith 0–3)

=== World Seniors Championship ===
- 2022: Second round (lost to Terry Jenkins 1–3)
- 2023: First round (lost to Neil Duff 2–3)
- 2024: Semi-final (lost to Colin McGarry 2–3)
- 2025: First round (lost to Tony O'Shea 2–3)

== Career finals ==
=== BDO major finals: 12 (9 titles) ===
Legend
World Championship (4–2)
World Masters (3–1)
Zuiderduin Masters (2–0)

Outcome	No.	Year	Championship	Opponent in the final	Score
Winner	1.	2008	Zuiderduin Masters (1)	(England) Trina Gulliver	2–0 (s)
Winner	2.	2011	World Masters (1)	(England) Trina Gulliver	4–1 (s)
Runner-up	3.	2013	World Championship (1)	(Russia) Anastasia Dobromyslova	1–2 (s)
Winner	4.	2014	World Championship (1)	(England) Deta Hedman	3–2 (s)
Winner	5.	2015	World Championship (2)	(England) Fallon Sherrock	3–1 (s)
Runner-up	6.	2015	World Masters (1)	(Netherlands) Aileen de Graaf	4–5 (s)
Winner	7.	2017	World Championship (3)	(Australia) Corrine Hammond	3–0 (s)
Winner	8.	2018	World Championship (4)	(Russia) Anastasia Dobromyslova	3–1 (s)
Winner	9.	2018	World Masters (2)	(England) Casey Gallagher	5–2 (s)
Winner	10.	2018	Zuiderduin Masters (2)	(England) Fallon Sherrock	2–1 (s)
Winner	11.	2019	World Masters (3)	(Russia) Anastasia Dobromyslova	5–4 (s)
Runner-up	12.	2020	World Championship (2)	(Japan) Mikuru Suzuki	0–3 (s)

=== PDC Women's televised finals: 1 (1 title) ===
Legend
Women's World Matchplay (1–0)

Outcome	No.	Year	Championship	Opponent in the final	Score
Winner	1.	2025	Women's World Matchplay	Fallon Sherrock	6–5 (l)

== Performance timeline ==
Lisa Ashton's performance timeline is as follows:

=== BDO ===
Tournament	2007	2008	2009	2010	2011	2012	2013	2014	2015	2016	2017	2018	2019	2020
BDO Ranked televised events
World Championship	DNP		QF	DNP		QF	F	W	W	QF	W	W	1R	F
World Masters	QF	SF	QF	SF	W	2R	3R	QF	F	QF	4R	W	W	NH
Finder Masters	DNP	W	Did not participate/qualify							RR	DNP	W	NH	

=== WDF ===
Tournament	2016	2017	2018	2019	2020	2021	2022	2023	2024
WDF Ranked major/platinum events
World Championship	Not held						DNP	SF	1R
Australian Open	Not held			W (Note: The 2019 Australian Open was not a ranked event.)	NH		RR	W	NH
Dutch Open (Note: The Dutch Open was a non-ranked event until 2020.)	W	F	Did not participate				4R	DNP	

=== PDC ===
Tournament	2019	2020	2021	2022	2023	2024	2025	2026
PDC Ranked televised events
World Championship	1R	DNQ	1R	1R	1R	DNQ		1R
UK Open	DNQ	1R	3R	Did not qualify				
Grand Slam	RR	RR	RR	RR	DNQ		RR	RR
PDC Televised women's events
Women's World Matchplay	Not held			SF	SF	SF	W	SF

==== Players Championships ====
Season	1	2	3	4	5	6	7	8	9	10	11	12	13	14	15	16	17	18	19	20	21	22	23	24	25	26	27	28	29	30
2020	BAR; 1R	BAR; 2R	WIG; 3R	WIG; 1R	WIG; 1R	WIG; 1R	BAR; 2R	BAR; 1R	MIL; 1R	MIL; 1R	MIL; 1R	MIL; 2R	MIL; 1R	NIE; 3R	NIE; 1R	NIE; 4R	NIE; 2R	NIE; 2R	COV; 1R	COV; 1R	COV; 1R	COV; 2R	COV; 2R							
2021	BOL; 1R	BOL; 1R	BOL; 1R	BOL; 1R	MIL; 4R	MIL; 1R	MIL; 1R	MIL; 1R	NIE; 1R	NIE; 1R	NIE; 1R	NIE; 2R	MIL; 1R	MIL; 2R	MIL; 1R	MIL; 1R	COV; 1R	COV; 1R	COV; 1R	COV; 1R	BAR; 1R	BAR; 1R	BAR; 1R	BAR; 1R	BAR; 2R	BAR; 2R	BAR; 2R	BAR; 2R	BAR; 1R	BAR; 1R

Performance Table Legend
W	Won the tournament	F	Finalist	SF	Semifinalist	QF	Quarterfinalist	#R; RR; Prel.	Lost in # round Round-robin; Preliminary round	DQ	Disqualified
DNQ	Did not qualify	DNP	Did not participate	WD	Withdrew	NH	Tournament not held	#R; RR; Prel.	Lost in # round Round-robin; Preliminary round	NYF	Not yet founded

== Titles ==
=== BDO ===
- Majors
  - BDO World Darts Championship (4): 2014, 2015, 2017, 2018
  - World Masters (3): 2011, 2018, 2019
  - BDO World Trophy (3): 2015, 2016, 2019
  - Finder Darts Masters (2): 2008, 2018
- Other tournaments
  - 2010: Welsh Classic
  - 2012: Jersey Classic
  - 2013: BDO Gold Cup, England Matchplay
  - 2014: Münsterland Classic, Jersey Open, Jersey Classic
  - 2015: Welsh Open, England Masters, England Classic, Jersey Open, Jersey Classic
  - 2016: Dutch Open, Isle of Man Open, Hal Masters, Hal Open, BDO International Open, Antwerp Open, Swedish Open, England Classic, England Matchplay, Jersey Open
  - 2017: Hal Open, French Open, Jersey Open
  - 2018: Isle of Man Classic, England Open, BDO Gold Cup, Belgium Open, Belgium Masters, Swedish Classic, British Open, Turkish Open
  - 2019: Scottish Open, British Classic, British Open

=== PDC ===
- PDC Women's Series
  - 2021 PDC Women's Series: 1, 3
  - 2022 PDC Women's Series: 1, 4, 5, 8, 10
  - 2023 PDC Women's Series: 1, 2, 4, 6, 8, 9, 12
  - 2024 PDC Women's Series: 18
  - 2025 PDC Women's Series: 1
  - 2026 PDC Women's Series: 5, 15

=== WDF ===
- Platinum ranked
  - 2023 Australian Darts Open
- Gold ranked
  - 2022 British Open
- Silver ranked
  - Pacific Masters (2): 2022, 2023
  - 2024 Swiss Open
- Bronze ranked
  - 2026 Lincolnshire Open
- Non-ranked
  - 2019 Australian Darts Open
- Cups
  - WDF World Cup Singles: 2015
  - WDF World Cup Pairs (2): 2009, 2015
  - WDF World Cup Teams: 2015
  - WDF World Cup Overall (2): 2009, 2015
  - WDF Europe Cup Teams: 2014
  - WDF Europe Cup Overall: 2014

=== Other ===
- England National Championships (2): 2011, 2012
