= Australian Darts Open =

Tournament information
- Venue: Moama Bowling Club
- Location: Moama
- Country: New South Wales; Australia
- Established: 2019
- Organisation(s): WDF
- Format: Legs
- Prize fund: A$80,000
- Month(s) Played: August

Current champion(s)
- Andy Baetens (men's); Lisa Ashton (women's)

The Australian Darts Open is a darts tournament held at Moama Bowling Club in Moama, Australia. First edition of the tournament took place in 2019. The next edition of this tournament took place in 2022 after an interruption caused by COVID-19 pandemic. World Darts Federation announced that the Australian Darts Open has been awarded Platinum ranking status, with a total prize fund of A$80,000.

Tournament has been open to players worldwide, with open qualifiers for this staged event across Australia. The stage format adopted for this tournament had been used before at the Finder Darts Masters. First winners of the tournament were Damon Heta and Lisa Ashton.

== Results ==
=== Men's ===
Year	Champion	Av.	Score	Runner-Up	Av.	Prize Money			Venue
Year	Champion	Av.	Score	Runner-Up	Av.	Total	Ch.	R.-Up	Venue
2019	Damon Heta	92.21	10 – 9	Scott Mitchell	94.12	A$50,000	A$15,000	A$5,000	Moama Bowling Club, Moama
2022	Raymond Smith	93.32	10 – 9	Haupai Puha	90.21	A$56,000	A$16,000	A$8,000	Moama Bowling Club, Moama
2023	Andy Baetens	92.62	10 – 2	Neil Duff	89.81	A$39,000	A$10,000	A$5,000	Moama Bowling Club, Moama

=== Women's ===
Year	Champion	Av.	Score	Runner-Up	Av.	Prize Money			Venue
Year	Champion	Av.	Score	Runner-Up	Av.	Total	Ch.	R.-Up	Venue
2019	Lisa Ashton	87.97	8 – 6	Mikuru Suzuki	85.41	A$21,000	A$10,000	A$5,000	Moama Bowling Club, Moama
2022	Beau Greaves	91.27	8 – 5	Mikuru Suzuki	89.46	A$24,000	A$8,000	A$4,000	Moama Bowling Club, Moama
2023	Lisa Ashton (2)	88.04	8 – 4	Aileen de Graaf	80.80	A$17,000	A$5,000	A$2,500	Moama Bowling Club, Moama
