= Mikuru Muramatsu =

Japanese darts player (born 1982)

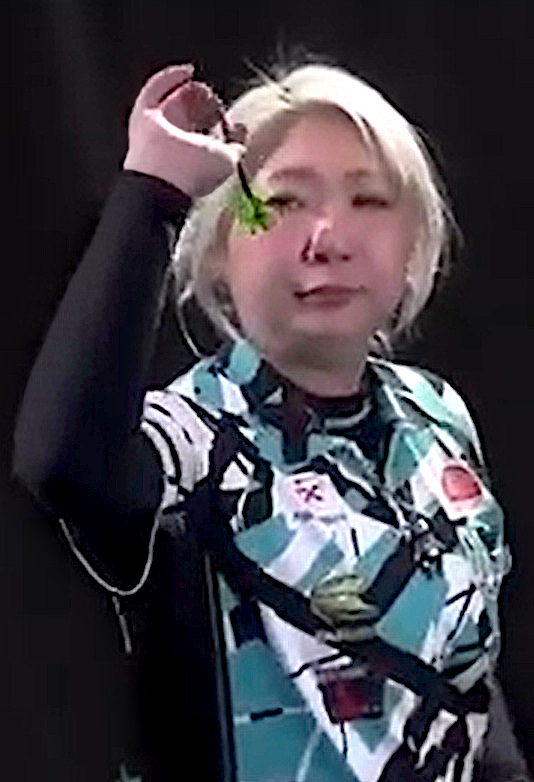
- Mikuru Muramatsu in 2024

Personal information
- Full name: Mikuru Suzuki Muramatsu
- Nickname: "The Miracle"
- Born: 5 February 1982 (age 44) Kagawa Prefecture, Japan
- Home town: Takamatsu, Kagawa, Japan

Sport
- Sport: Darts
- Playing since: 2011
- Darts: 24g Target Signature Gen 6
- Laterality: Right-handed
- Walk-on music: "Baby Shark" by Pinkfong

Organisation (see split in darts)
- BDO: 2016–2020
- PDC: 2019–
- WDF: 2016–
- Current world ranking: (WDF W) NR (17 August 2026)

WDF major events – best performances
- World Championship: Winner (2): 2019, 2020
- World Masters: Quarter Final: 2017, 2018
- World Trophy: Quarter-final: 2019
- Australian Open: Runner-up: 2019, 2022
- Dutch Open: Winner (1): 2019

PDC premier events – best performances
- World Championship: Last 96: 2020, 2024
- Grand Slam: Group Stage: 2019, 2020

Other tournament wins
- Years
| Hong Kong Open | 2015, 2017, 2018 |
| Japan Open | 2018, 2022 |
| Korean Open | 2018 |
| Pacific Masters | 2019 |
| Swedish Open | 2019 |
| West Japan Cup | 2022 |
| PDC Women's Series | 2021, 2023 (x3), 2024 (x2) |
Medal record
Women's Darts
Representing Japan
WDF World Cup
| Gold medal – first place | 2019 Cluj | Women's singles |
| Gold medal – first place | 2019 Cluj | Women's pairs |
| Bronze medal – third place | 2017 Kobe | Women's team |
WDF Asia-Pacific Cup
| Gold medal – first place | 2016 Osaka | Women's singles |
| Gold medal – first place | 2018 Seoul | Women's singles |
| Silver medal – second place | 2016 Osaka | Women's pairs |
| Bronze medal – third place | 2012 Darwin | Women's pairs |
| Bronze medal – third place | 2018 Seoul | Women's pairs |

Mikuru Muramatsu (村松 未来, Muramatsu Mikuru; née Suzuki; born 5 February 1982) is a Japanese darts player who competes in both World Darts Federation (WDF) and Professional Darts Corporation (PDC) events and previously competed in British Darts Organisation (BDO) events. She is a two-time women's world champion, having won two consecutive BDO World Darts Championship titles.

== Career ==
Suzuki is an experienced soft-tip darts player, having competed in many tournaments and professional tours in her home country of Japan, as well as across east Asia. She began playing darts in her late twenties, winning many mainly soft-tip tournaments in Asia before becoming BDO World Champion aged 36 in 2019.

=== BDO titles ===
In 2018, Suzuki qualified for the 2019 BDO World Darts Championship as a qualifier, where she caused a huge upset by defeating the reigning champion and number two seed and four-time champion Lisa Ashton in the first round, 2 sets to 0. At the Quarter-Final stages of the championship, she defeated Dutch player Sharon Prins by the same score to reach the Semi-Final. In the Semi-Finals, once again by 2 sets to 0, she defeated Maria O'Brien, keeping her Lakeside record of dropping no sets fully intact to reach her first BDO World Darts Championship final on her debut. She went on to defeat Lorraine Winstanley 3–0 to win the title on her debut year. She did not drop a set en route to the title, and only lost two legs in the Final. Former professional darts player and current pundit Chris Mason said of her victory on Eurosport that: "She is the Phil Taylor of the ladies' game. He raised the bar for the men, this is the same for the ladies' game." Suzuki was also the Ladies' Singles winner in the 2019 Dutch Open.

Suzuki retained her BDO title in 2020, beating Lisa Ashton in the 2020 BDO World Darts Championship final.

=== PDC ===
Suzuki qualified for the 2020 PDC World Darts Championship by winning a women's qualifying event. In the first round she was against James Richardson. She came from 0–2 down to bring it back to 2–2 but lost the deciding set in a 2–3 defeat.

Suzuki participated in PDC UK Q-School in 2020, but was unable to obtain a tour card after losing to Nathan Rafferty.

In 2021 Suzuki won one PDC Women's Series event but failed to qualify for the 2022 PDC World Championship.

In 2022 Suzuki reached the final in five PDC Women's Series events but didn't win any of them.

In the third PDC Women's Series event of 2023 Suzuki ended Beau Greaves 70 match winning run in PDC Women's Series events by beating her 5–4 in the quarter final. Suzuki then beat Trina Gulliver 5–0 in the semi final and Rhian O'Sullivan 5–1 in the final.

Suzuki qualified for the 2023 Women's World Matchplay by being in the top 8 of Women's Series order of merit at the cut off point. This was her debut at the event. She reached the final but lost 1–6 to Greaves.

In total Suzuki won three PDC Women's Series events in 2023 and qualified for the 2024 PDC World Darts Championship.

== World Championship results ==
=== BDO/WDF ===
- 2019: Winner (beat Lorraine Winstanley 3–0)
- 2020: Winner (beat Lisa Ashton 3–0)
- 2022: Second round (lost to Aileen de Graaf 1–2)
- 2025: Second round (lost to Deta Hedman 1–2)

=== PDC ===
- 2020: First round (lost to James Richardson 2–3)
- 2024: First round (lost to Ricardo Pietreczko 0–3)

== Performance timeline ==
=== BDO ===
| Tournament | 2016 | 2017 | 2018 | 2019 | 2020 |
|---|---|---|---|---|---|
BDO Ranked televised events
| World Championship | Did not qualify | | | W | W |
| World Masters | 3R | QF | QF | 3R | NH |
| World Trophy | Did not participate | | | QF | NH |

=== WDF ===
| Tournament | 2019 | 2022 | 2025 |
|---|---|---|---|
WDF Ranked major/platinum events
| World Championship | NH | 2R | 2R |
| World Masters | NH | 5R | DNP |
| Australian Open | F | F | NH |
| Dutch Open (Note: A non-ranked event until 2020) | W | DNP | |

=== PDC ===
| Tournament | 2019 | 2020 | 2023 | 2024 | 2025 |
|---|---|---|---|---|---|
PDC Ranked televised events
| World Championship | DNQ | 1R | DNQ | 1R | WDF |
| Grand Slam | RR | RR | Did not qualify | | |
PDC Televised women's events
| Women's World Matchplay | Not held | | F | SF | DNP |

Performance Table Legend
| W | Won the tournament | F | Finalist | SF | Semifinalist | QF | Quarterfinalist | #R; RR; Prel. | Lost in # round Round-robin; Preliminary round | DQ | Disqualified |
| DNQ | Did not qualify | DNP | Did not participate | WD | Withdrew | NH | Tournament not held | #R; RR; Prel. | Lost in # round Round-robin; Preliminary round | NYF | Not yet founded |
