= Tori Kewish =

Australian darts player (born 1997)

Personal information
- Nickname: "Torza"
- Born: 5 May 1997 (age 29) Stawell, Victoria, Australia
- Home town: Melbourne, Victoria, Australia

Sport
- Sport: Darts
- Playing since: 2015
- Darts: 21g Shot
- Laterality: Right-handed
- Walk-on music: "Dance Monkey" by Tones and I

Organisation (see split in darts)
- BDO: 2017–2020
- WDF: 2017–
- Current world ranking: (WDF W) NR (17 August 2026)

WDF major events – best performances
- World Championship: Last 16: 2020
- World Masters: Group Stages: 2022
- Dutch Open: Last 16: 2024

Other tournament wins
- Years
Women's Australian Masters	2017, 2018, 2019
Women's Central Coast Classic	2017
Women's Australian Grand Masters	2019
Women's Geelong Dart Club Classic	2018, 2019
Women's Great Lakes Open	2018, 2019
Women's Van Dieman Classic	2017
Women's Murray Bridge Classic	2017,
Women's Newcastle Classic	2018, 2019, 2020
Women's Pacific Masters	2017, 2018
Women's WDF Asia-Pacific Cup	2018
Women's Sunshine State Classic	2018, 2022
Women's Victorian Classic	2020, 2021, 2022
Women's West Coast Classic	2018, 2019, 2020

Tori Kewish (born 5 May 1997) is an Australian professional darts player who plays in World Darts Federation (WDF) events.

== Career ==
In December 2019, Kewish qualified for the 2020 BDO World Darts Championship as the 15th seed after Trina Gulliver withdrew from the tournament due to illness. She lost to Beau Greaves in the first round.

In 2022, Kewish qualified for the 2022 WDF World Darts Championship She went on a good run defeating Lorraine Hyde & Deta Hedman without dropping a set. She reached the Quarter final where she lost a close match to Lorraine Winstanley 2–1. Kewish has also qualified for the 2022 Australian Darts Open, Which is due to be played in August.

Kewish has won 25 WDF titles in Australia in her career to date.

== World Championship results ==
=== BDO/WDF ===
- 2020: First round (lost to Beau Greaves 0–2)
- 2022: Quarter-finals (lost to Lorraine Winstanley 1–2)
