= Neil Duff =

Northern Irish darts player (born 1972)

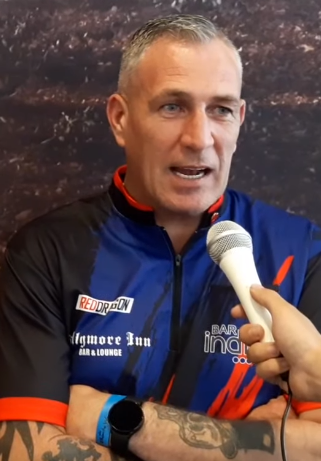
- Duff in 2022

Personal information
- Nickname: "Duffman"
- Born: 22 July 1972 (age 54) Ballyclare, Northern Ireland

Sport
- Sport: Darts
- Playing since: 2003
- Darts: 23g Red Dragon Signature
- Laterality: Right-handed
- Walk-on music: "Welcome To The Party" by Dj Krissy

Organisation (see split in darts)
- BDO: 2006–2020
- WDF: 2006–
- Current world ranking: (WDF) 5 ▼1 (17 August 2026)

WDF major events – best performances
- World Championship: Winner (1): 2022
- World Masters: Quarter-final: 2019

WSDT major events – best performances
- World Championship: Quarter-final: 2023
- World Matchplay: Semi-final: 2023
- World Masters: Quarter-final: 2023, 2024

Other tournament wins
- Years
ADC The Vault National Finals	2023
British Pentathlon	2021
England National Singles	2021
England Open	2024
Irish Classic	2022
Pacific Masters	2022
Slovak Masters	2022
World Seniors Target Open Series 2	2023
MyDarts.ch SDC Championship	2024
Modus Super Series Double Trouble	2024, 2026
Modus Super Series Weekly Winner	2023, 2024, 2025, 2026
ADC Northern Ireland belt holder	2026

Neil Duff (born 22 July 1972) is a Northern Irish professional darts player who competes in World Darts Federation (WDF) events. He is a former WDF World Champion, having won the 2022 World Championship. He was previously ranked number one in the WDF World Rankings.

== Career ==
Duff started playing darts when he was almost 30 years old and did not turn professional until he approached 50.

Duff reached the quarter-finals of the 2019 World Masters but lost to eventual champion John O'Shea.

In April 2022, Duff won the inaugural WDF World Darts Championship. He defeated Justin Thompson and Nick Fullwell before a quarter-final comeback win against Jim McEwan, where Duff recovered from 3–0 down to beat McEwan 4–3. He beat Richard Veenstra 5–2 in the semi-finals to reach the final, where he defeated Thibault Tricole 6–5 and became the first Northern Irish world darts champion, as well as the first player to win at the Lakeside on debut since Christian Kist at the 2012 BDO World Championship. He won the title on his daughter Hayley's eighteenth birthday. Duff's win was celebrated at an event in his home town Ballyclare that was organised by the Antrim and Newtownabbey Borough Council.

At the 2023 WDF World Championship, Duff began his title defence with a 3–1 win over Moreno Blom. In the next round, he went 2–1 down against Martyn Turner but won the match 3–2 to progress to the quarter-finals. Duff's title defence was ended by Chris Landman who defeated Duff 4–3. Despite the exit, Duff was ranked number one in the WDF World Rankings after the tournament after players won PDC Tour Cards at 2024 Q-School, leading to their removal from the WDF rankings.

At the 2024 WDF World Championship, Duff reached the quarter-finals. He went 3–0 down to Jason Brandon but won the next three sets to level the match at 3–3. However, Brandon won the last set to beat Duff 4–3.

== Personal life ==
Duff worked as a joiner before becoming a full-time professional darts player.

== World Championship results ==
=== WDF ===
- 2022: Winner (beat Thibault Tricole 6–5) (sets)
- 2023: Quarter-finals (lost to Chris Landman 3–4)
- 2024: Quarter-finals (lost to Jason Brandon 3–4)
- 2025: Second round (lost to Ben Robb 1–3)

=== WSDT ===
- 2023: Quarter-finals (lost to Robert Thornton 1–3)
- 2024: Second round (lost to Paul Hogan 0–3)
- 2025: Second round (lost to Graham Usher 1–3)

== Career finals ==
=== WDF major finals: 1 (1 title) ===
Legend
World Championship (1–0)

Outcome	No.	Year	Championship	Opponent in the final	Score (Note: (l) = score in legs, (s) = score in sets.)
Winner	1.	2022	World Championship	(France) Thibault Tricole	6–5 (s)

== Performance timeline ==
BDO

Tournament	2006	2015	2016	2017	2019
BDO Ranked televised events
World Masters	4R	2R	5R	6R	QF

WDF

Tournament	2022	2023	2024	2025
WDF Ranked major/platinum events
World Championship	W	QF	QF	2R
World Masters	3R	NH	2R	RR
Dutch Open	3R	5R	DNP	
Australian Open	SF	RU	NH	

Performance Table Legend
W	Won the tournament	F	Finalist	SF	Semifinalist	QF	Quarterfinalist	#R; RR; L#	Lost in # round Round-robin; Last # stage	DQ	Disqualified
DNQ	Did not qualify	DNP	Did not participate	WD	Withdrew	NH	Tournament not held	#R; RR; L#	Lost in # round Round-robin; Last # stage	NYF	Not yet founded
