= 2014 Malta Open darts =

Malta Open

Tournament information
- Country: Malta
- Organisation(s): BDO, WDF, MDA
- Winner's share: €1,200

Champion(s)
- (England) John Walton

2014 Malta Open was a darts tournament part of the annual, Malta Open, which took place in Malta in 2014.

== Results ==
=== Last 32 ===
Player
(England) Andy Keen
(Malta) Charles Ghiller
(England) Ricky Williams
(Cyprus) Ermos Korradou
(Germany) Jurgen Brech
(England) Mark Tiller
(Germany) Thomas Obstfelder
(Cyprus) Economou Floros
(Malta) John Agius
(Wales) Mark Layton
(England) Mark Thomson
(Malta) George Mizzi
(England) Paul Orchard
(Malta) Malcolm Smith
(Germany) Karsten Kornath
(England) Peter Smith

=== Last 16 ===
Final 16
(England)	John Walton	2
(England)	Jamie Robinson	0
(Netherlands)	Matthew Medhurst	2
(Scotland)	Mark Cameron	0
(Greece)	John Michael	2
(Greece)	Stathis Pantelidis	1
(Wales)	Mark Layton	2
(Germany)	Mark Mulholland	0
(Greece)	Kostas Pantelidis	2
(England)	Zach Quinn	1
(England)	Josh McCarthy	2
(Scotland)	Darren Walls	1
(Malta)	Albert Scerri	2
(Italy)	Salvatore Mantarro	0
(England)	Craig Stoner	2
(Malta)	Norbert Attard	0

Quarter-finals
(England)	John Walton	2
(Netherlands)	Matthew Medhurst	0
(Greece)	John Michael	2
(Wales)	Mark Layton	0
(Greece)	Kostas Pantelidis	2
(England)	Josh McCarthy	0
(Malta)	Albert Scerri	2
(England)	Craig Stoner	1

Semi-finals
(England)	John Walton	2
(Greece)	John Michael	0
(Greece)	Kostas Pantelidis	2
(Malta)	Albert Scerri	1

Final
(England)	John Walton	2
(Greece)	Kostas Pantelidis	0
