= 2005 Malta Open darts =

Malta Open

Tournament information
- Dates: 25 November 2005
- Country: Malta
- Organisation(s): BDO, WDF, MDA
- Winner's share: Lm 500

Champion(s)
- (England) Joe Palmer

2005 Malta Open was a darts tournament part of the annual, Malta Open, which took place in Malta in 2005.

== Results ==
| Round | Player |
|---|---|
| Winner | (England) Joe Palmer |
| Final | (England) David Hirst |
| Semi-finals | (Germany) Colin Rice |
| Semi-finals | (Germany) Olaf Tupuschis |
| Quarter-finals | (Malta) Vincent Busuttil |
| Quarter-finals | (Malta) Gordon Stanmore |
| Quarter-finals | (Germany) Andreas Krockel |
| Quarter-finals | (Greece) John Michael |
| Last 16 | (Malta) Carmelo Fenech |
| Last 16 | (Malta) Tony Briffa |
| Last 16 | (Malta) Anthony Caruana |
| Last 16 | (England) Roy Peacock |
| Last 16 | (England) Mark Maggerth |
| Last 16 | (Malta) Joe Caruana |
| Last 16 | (Malta) Godfrey Abela |
| Last 16 | (Malta) Chris Cohen |
