= 2010 Malta Open darts =

Malta Open

Tournament information
- Dates: 18 November 2010
- Country: Malta
- Organisation(s): BDO, WDF, MDA
- Winner's share: €1,200

Champion(s)
- (England) Roy Brown

2010 Malta Open was a darts tournament part of the annual, Malta Open, which took place in Malta in 2010.

== Results ==
| Round | Player |
|---|---|
| Winner | (England) Roy Brown |
| Final | (England) Andy Keen |
| Semi-finals | (England) Chris Aubrey |
| Semi-finals | (England) Wayne Thurlow |
| Quarter-finals | (England) Eddie Simmonds |
| Quarter-finals | (England) Ken Sowerby |
| Quarter-finals | (Germany) Andreas Krockel |
| Quarter-finals | (Germany) Kai Geselle |
| Last 16 | (Italy) Luca Catallo |
| Last 16 | (Germany) Karsten Kornath |
| Last 16 | (Malta) Mario Cutajar |
| Last 16 | (England) Alan Bone |
| Last 16 | (England) John Blaney |
| Last 16 | (Malta) Vincent Busuttil |
| Last 16 | (Germany) Marco Salmen |
| Last 16 | (Malta) Martin Azzopardi |
| Last 32 | (England) Mark Thomson |
| Last 32 | (Malta) Norbert Attard |
| Last 32 | (England) Drew Watson |
| Last 32 | (England) Alan Currivan |
| Last 32 | (Malta) Mario Aquilina |
| Last 32 | (England) Joe Pawley |
| Last 32 | (Malta) Jesmond Grima |
| Last 32 | (Germany) Bjorn Derichs |
| Last 32 | (Germany) James Adams-Bosch |
| Last 32 | (England) Graeme Dutton |
| Last 32 | (England) Alan Yates |
| Last 32 | (Germany) Ingo Goebel |
| Last 32 | (England) Jason Blackmore |
| Last 32 | (Malta) Chris Cohen |
| Last 32 | (Cyprus) Steve Claxton |
| Last 32 | (Malta) Joe Abela |
