= 2007 Malta Open darts =

Malta Open

Tournament information
- Dates: 1 November 2007
- Country: Malta
- Organisation(s): BDO, WDF, MDA
- Winner's share: Lm 500

Champion(s)
- (Greece) John Michael

2007 Malta Open was a darts tournament part of the annual, Malta Open, which took place in Malta in 2007.

== Results ==
Last 16
(England) Roy Brown
(Cyprus) Andreas Laos
(England) Martyn Cooper
(England) Mike Lloyd
(Wales) Peter Aleman
(Malta) Alfred Desira
(Malta) Chris Cohen
(Malta) Gordon Stanmore

Quarter-finals
(Greece) | John Michael | 2
(Wales) | Alan Walker | 0
(England) | Bob Phillips | 2
(Malta) | Vincent Busuttil | 0
(Germany) | Colin Rice | 2
(England) | Richie Corner | 0
(England) | Andy Keen | 2
(Malta) | Carmelo Fenech | 0

Semi-finals
(Greece) | John Michael | 2
(England) | Bob Phillips | 0
(Germany) | Colin Rice | 2
(England) | Andy Keen | 1

Final
(Greece) | John Michael | 2
(Germany) | Colin Rice | 1
