= 2003 Malta Open darts =

Dart Tournament

Malta Open

Tournament information
- Dates: 19 November 2003
- Country: Malta
- Organisation(s): BDO, WDF, MDA
- Winner's share: Lm 500

Champion(s)
- (England) Andy Keen

2003 Malta Open was a darts tournament part of the annual, Malta Open, which took place in Malta in 2003.

== Results ==
Round	Player
Winner	(England) Andy Keen
Final	(Greece) John Michael
Semi-finals	(Germany) Stephan Schneider
Semi-finals	(Italy) Sergio Pettarini
Quarter-finals	(Malta) Joe Caruana
Quarter-finals	(Malta) Felix Zerri
Quarter-finals	(Netherlands) Jacques Nieuwlaat
Quarter-finals	(Malta) Emmanuel Ciantar
