= 2004 Malta Open darts =

Malta Open

Tournament information
- Dates: 19 November 2004
- Country: Malta
- Organisation(s): BDO, WDF, MDA
- Winner's share: Lm 500

Champion(s)
- (Greece) John Michael

2004 Malta Open was a darts tournament part of the annual, Malta Open, which took place in Malta in 2004.

== Results ==
Round	Player
Winner	(Greece) John Michael
Final	(Italy) Marco Apollonio
Semi-finals	(Malta) Godfrey Abela
Semi-finals	(England) Andy Keen
Quarter-finals	(Malta) Charles Ghiller
Quarter-finals	(Malta) Anthony Caruana
Quarter-finals	(Wales) Peter Aleman
Quarter-finals	(Malta) Alfred Desira
