= Hampshire Open =

Annual darts competition

The Hampshire Open is an annual darts tournament held in May / June in Southampton. It is England's largest one day darts tournament with usually around 500 players.

Since the first event held in 2000, there have been 16 winners and 3 players, Colin Monk and his son Arron, and Paul Hogan, have won the event on more than one occasion: Colin has won 3 times in 2003, 2008 and 2009, and Arron in 2010 and 2016. Hogan won in 2002 and 2014. The prize was £1000, but £2000 was paid to the winner in 2025. Last annual tournament was held in 2017, but was revived in 2025. PDC Pro Tour Card Holder Cam Crabtree won the 2026 Edition of the event.

Year	Winner
2000	Paul Carter
2001	Ronnie Baxter
2002	Paul Hogan
2003	Colin Monk
2004	Les Wallace
2005	Mark Thomson
2006	Neil Raikes
2007	Kirk Shepherd
2008	Colin Monk
2009	Colin Monk
2010	Arron Monk
2011	Johnny Haines
2012	Andy Parsons
2013	Scott Mitchell
2014	Paul Hogan
2015	Andy Jenkins
2016	Arron Monk
2017	Mike Symes
2025	Scott Walters
2026	Cam Crabtree
