= 2000 Malta Open darts =

Malta Open

Tournament information
- Dates: 25 November 2000
- Country: Malta
- Organisation(s): BDO, WDF, MDA
- Winner's share: Lm 500

Champion(s)
- (England) Andy Keen

2000 Malta Open was a darts tournament part of the annual, Malta Open, which took place in Malta in 2000.

== Results ==
Round	Player
Winner	(England) Andy Keen
Final	(Wales) Kerry Feltham
Semi-finals	(Malta) Vincent Busuttil
Semi-finals	(Northern Ireland) Mitchell Crooks
Quarter-finals	(Malta) Godfrey Abela
Quarter-finals	(Malta) Joe Carauna
Quarter-finals	(Malta) Emmanuel Ciantar
Quarter-finals	(Malta) Charles Ghiller
