= 2020 Belgian Darts Championship =

2020 edition of Belgian Darts Championship

Tournament information
- Dates: 28 February–1 March 2020
- Venue: Expo Hasselt
- Location: Hasselt, Belgium
- Organisation(s): Professional Darts Corporation (PDC)
- Format: Legs
- Prize fund: £140,000
- Winner's share: £25,000
- High checkout: 170 Ryan Searle

Champion(s)
- Gerwyn Price

The 2020 Belgian Darts Championship was the first of four PDC European Tour events on the 2020 PDC Pro Tour. The tournament took place at the Expo Hasselt, Hasselt, Belgium, from 28 February to 1 March 2020. It featured a field of 48 players and £140,000 in prize money, with £25,000 going to the winner.

This was the first PDC European Tour event to take place in Belgium.

Gerwyn Price won his third European Tour title with an 8–3 win over Michael Smith in the final.

== Prize money ==
This is how the prize money is divided, with the prize money being unchanged from the 2019 European Tour:

Stage (num. of players)		Prize money
Winner	(1)	£25,000
Runner-up	(1)	£10,000
Semi-finalists	(2)	£6,500
Quarter-finalists	(4)	£5,000
Third round losers	(8)	£3,000
Second round losers	(16)	£2,000*
First round losers	(16)	£1,000*
Total	£140,000	

- Seeded players who lose in the second round and Host Nation invitees who lose in the first round do not receive this prize money on any Orders of Merit.

== Qualification and format ==
The top 16 entrants from the PDC ProTour Order of Merit on 4 February will automatically qualify for the event and will be seeded in the second round.

The remaining 32 places will go to players from four qualifying events and to two invitees – 24 from the Tour Card Holder Qualifier (held on 14 February), two from the Associate Member Qualifier (held on 27 February), three from the Host Nation Qualifier (held on 27 February) and one from the East European Associate Member Qualifier (held on 7 February).

The two highest ranked Belgian players on the cut-off date will also qualify.

From 2020, all Tour Card holders will enter into one qualifier instead of two separate ones for the UK and Europe. For this tournament, there is no Nordic & Baltic qualifier due to the event being a late addition to the calendar. The place will be taken by an extra Host Nation qualifier.

The following players will take part in the tournament:

Top 16

1. (Netherlands) Michael van Gerwen (third round)
2. (England) Ian White (second round)
3. (Wales) Gerwyn Price (champion)
4. (Scotland) Peter Wright (semi-finals)
5. (Poland) Krzysztof Ratajski (quarter-finals)
6. (Austria) Mensur Suljović (quarter-finals)
7. (England) James Wade (third round)
8. (England) Glen Durrant (second round)
9. (England) Joe Cullen (second round)
10. (England) Nathan Aspinall (quarter-finals)
11. (Wales) Jonny Clayton (second round)
12. (England) Rob Cross (third round)
13. (Netherlands) Jermaine Wattimena (second round)
14. (England) Jamie Hughes (third round)
15. (Netherlands) Jeffrey de Zwaan (third round)
16. (England) Michael Smith (runner-up)

Tour Card Holders Qualifier
- (England) Andy Hamilton (second round)
- (England) Justin Pipe (first round)
- (England) Steve Beaton (second round)
- (Australia) Darren Penhall (first round)
- (Netherlands) Dirk van Duijvenbode (semi-finals)
- (Austria) Rowby-John Rodriguez (first round)
- (Australia) Damon Heta (second round)
- (Hong Kong) Kai Fan Leung (first round)
- (England) Stephen Bunting (first round)
- (Netherlands) Ron Meulenkamp (first round)
- (England) Michael Barnard (first round)
- (Netherlands) Martijn Kleermaker (third round)
- (Netherlands) Danny Noppert (third round)
- (Belgium) Mike De Decker (second round)
- (England) Callan Rydz (first round)
- (England) Steve West (third round)
- (Germany) Gabriel Clemens (second round)
- (Netherlands) Derk Telnekes (first round)
- (England) Ryan Searle (second round)
- (England) Andy Boulton (first round)
- (Republic of Ireland) Steve Lennon (second round)
- (England) Luke Woodhouse (first round)
- (England) Mervyn King (quarter-finals)
- (England) Luke Humphries (first round)

Associate Member Qualifier
- (Netherlands) Wesley Plaisier (second round)
- (England) Ryan Harrington (first round)

Highest Ranked Belgians
- (Belgium) Dimitri Van den Bergh (second round)
- (Belgium) Kim Huybrechts (second round)

Host Nation Qualifier
- (Belgium) Jeffrey Van Egdom (first round)
- (Belgium) Ronny Huybrechts (second round)
- (Belgium) Geert De Vos (first round)

East European Qualifier
- (Slovenia) Benjamin Pratnemer (first round)

== Draw ==
First round (best of 11 legs); 28 February
(Belgium) Mike De Decker 94.25	6
(Netherlands) Ron Meulenkamp 91.34	5
(England) Luke Humphries 82.91	1
(Belgium) Ronny Huybrechts 89.32	6
(England) Justin Pipe 94.49	4
(England) Mervyn King 93.06	6
(Netherlands) Martijn Kleermaker 83.14	6
(England) Stephen Bunting 87.74	4
(England) Andy Boulton 91.56	5
(England) Andy Hamilton 90.81	6
(Netherlands) Danny Noppert 88.78	6
(Belgium) Geert De Vos 86.62	2
(England) Callan Rydz 98.93	3
(Germany) Gabriel Clemens 94.37	6
(England) Michael Barnard 81.71	0
(Australia) Damon Heta 102.48	6
(Netherlands) Dirk van Duijvenbode 101.59	6
(England) Luke Woodhouse 93.33	4
(England) Ryan Harrington 86.18	2
(Belgium) Kim Huybrechts 89.88	6
(Austria) Rowby-John Rodriguez 87.16	3
(Republic of Ireland) Steve Lennon 89.77	6
(Hong Kong) Kai Fan Leung 86.77	4
(England) Steve Beaton 92.98	6
(Netherlands) Wesley Plaisier 86.09	6
(Slovenia) Benjamin Pratnemer 82.16	5
(Belgium) Dimitri Van den Bergh 86.58	6
(Netherlands) Derk Telnekes 83.78	3
(Australia) Darren Penhall 80.16	3
(England) Ryan Searle 92.10	6
(England) Steve West 78.42	6
(Belgium) Jeffrey Van Egdom 67.03	0

Second round (best of 11 legs); 29 February
1	(Netherlands) Michael van Gerwen 99.71	6
(Belgium) Mike De Decker 91.08	3
16	(England) Michael Smith 103.28	6
(Belgium) Ronny Huybrechts 97.12	1
8	(England) Glen Durrant 99.91	4
(England) Mervyn King 105.98	6
9	(England) Joe Cullen 87.46	3
(Netherlands) Martijn Kleermaker 91.80	6
4	(Scotland) Peter Wright 90.92	6
(England) Andy Hamilton 85.15	2
13	(Netherlands) Jermaine Wattimena 100.40	2
(Netherlands) Danny Noppert 108.96	6
5	(Poland) Krzysztof Ratajski 98.29	6
(Germany) Gabriel Clemens 94.56	2
12	(England) Rob Cross 91.17	6
(Australia) Damon Heta 92.06	1
2	(England) Ian White 88.19	3
(Netherlands) Dirk van Duijvenbode 87.42	6
15	(Netherlands) Jeffrey de Zwaan 93.24	6
(Belgium) Kim Huybrechts 91.97	4
7	(England) James Wade 97.79	6
(Republic of Ireland) Steve Lennon 96.07	3
10	(England) Nathan Aspinall 98.73	6
(England) Steve Beaton 93.47	3
3	(Wales) Gerwyn Price 90.61	6
(Netherlands) Wesley Plaisier 84.24	1
14	(England) Jamie Hughes 92.15	6
(Belgium) Dimitri Van den Bergh 97.42	5
6	(Austria) Mensur Suljović 93.19	6
(England) Ryan Searle 98.28	4
11	(Wales) Jonny Clayton 104.14	4
(England) Steve West 100.65	6

Third round (best of 11 legs); 1 March
1	(Netherlands) van Gerwen 97.43	5
16	(England) Smith 93.35	6
(England) King 93.11	6
(Netherlands) Kleermaker 94.18	3
4	(Scotland) Wright 99.18	6
(Netherlands) Noppert 92.76	3
5	(Poland) Ratajski 94.14	6
12	(England) Cross 90.81	3
(Netherlands) van Duijvenbode 95.08	6
15	(Netherlands) de Zwaan 91.06	4
7	(England) Wade 97.42	4
10	(England) Aspinall 103.29	6
3	(Wales) Price 105.93	6
14	(England) Hughes 101.81	0
6	(Austria) Suljović 103.58	6
(England) West 96.02	4

Quarter-finals (best of 11 legs); 1 March
16	(England) Smith 107.85	6
(England) King 93.19	1
4	(Scotland) Wright 102.09	6
5	(Poland) Ratajski 97.51	4
(Netherlands) van Duijvenbode 102.94	6
10	(England) Aspinall 103.75	5
3	(Wales) Price 100.16	6
6	(Austria) Suljović 88.31	2

Semi-finals (best of 13 legs); 1 March
16	(England) Smith 102.04	7
4	(Scotland) Wright 100.10	5
(Netherlands) van Duijvenbode 91.38	4
3	(Wales) Price 92.58	7

Final (best of 15 legs); 1 March
16	(England) Smith 96.26	3
3	(Wales) Price 100.03	8
