= 2009 Malta Open darts =

Malta Open

Tournament information
- Dates: 19 November 2009
- Country: Malta
- Organisation(s): BDO, WDF, MDA
- Winner's share: €1,200

Champion(s)
- (England) Mark Thomson

2009 Malta Open was a darts tournament part of the annual, Malta Open, which took place in Malta in 2009.

== Results ==
| Round | Player |
|---|---|
| Winner | (England) Mark Thomson |
| Final | (England) Roy Brown |
| Semi-finals | (Cyprus) Steve Claxton |
| Semi-finals | (England) Wayne Thurlow |
| Quarter-finals | (Malta) Mario Camilleri |
| Quarter-finals | (Cyprus) Andreas Laos |
| Quarter-finals | (England) Gary Eastwood |
| Quarter-finals | (Malta) George Mizzi |
| Last 16 | (Cyprus) Sortiris Flokkas |
| Last 16 | (Malta) Anthony Caruana |
| Last 16 | (Malta) Jesmond Grima |
| Last 16 | (England) Ben Walford |
| Last 16 | (Germany) James Adams-Bosch |
| Last 16 | (Malta) Alfred Desira |
| Last 16 | (Germany) Colin Rice |
| Last 16 | (Cyprus) Ian Oates |
| Preliminary round | (Cyprus) Tony Croxford |
| Preliminary round | (Cyprus) Paul Deacon |
| Preliminary round | (Cyprus) Roger Bloxham |
