= Romanian International Darts Open =

Romanian Open

Tournament information
- Venue: InterContinental Bucharest
- Location: Bucharest, Romania
- Established: 2010
- Organisation(s): World Darts Federation (WDF)
- Format: Legs
- Prize fund: €8,000
- Month(s) Played: January

Current champion(s)
- Cayden Smith (ENG) (open); Deta Hedman (ENG) (women's)

The Romanian Open is a darts tournament that is run by the Romanian Darts Federation (Federația Română de Darts). It is played in a legs format.

== History ==
The tournament was established in 2010 and has been run yearly since. RIDO has been televised in Romania by Sport.ro since 2011.

== Accreditation ==
RIDO is a WDF Ranking 1 event for men and WDF Ranking 2 event for women, and a BDO Invitation Category B ranking event. RIDO grants entry to the following year's Winmau World Masters for both the men and women singles' winners.

== List of winners ==
=== Men's ===
Year	Champion	Av.	Score	Runner-Up	Av.	Prize Money			Venue
Year	Champion	Av.	Score	Runner-Up	Av.	Total	Ch.	R.-Up	Venue
2010	(Hungary) Nándor Bezzeg	n/a	6 – 0	(Cyprus) Marios Myrianthous	n/a	€5,620	€2,500	€1,000	Grand Hotel, Bucharest
2011	(England) Joe Murnan	n/a	6 – 2	(Slovakia) Peter Martin	n/a	€5,120	€2,000	€1,000	Grand Hotel, Bucharest
2012	(Netherlands) Jeffrey de Graaf	n/a	6 – 2	(Wales) Martin Phillips	n/a	€4,320	€1,600	€800	Grand Hotel, Bucharest
2013	(England) Tony O'Shea	n/a	6 – 1	(Netherlands) Ron Meulenkamp	n/a	€4,320	€1,600	€800	Grand Hotel, Bucharest
2014	(England) Scott Waites	83.76	7 – 4	(Finland) Sami Sanssi	83.37	€4,320	€1,600	€800	Grand Hotel, Bucharest
2016	(Netherlands) Fabian Roosenbrand	n/a	6 – 3	(England) Scott Baker	n/a	€4,320	€1,600	€800	Grand Hotel, Bucharest
2017	(Netherlands) Silko Visser	83.88	6 – 5	(England) Martin Atkins	90.90	€4,320	€1,600	€800	Grand Hotel, Bucharest
2018	(Wales) Martin Phillips	n/a	6 – 0	(England) Garry Thompson	n/a	€6,200	€2,000	€1,000	Grand Hotel, Bucharest
2019	Dave Parletti	n/a	6 – 5	Gary Robson	n/a	RON 28,530	RON 9,300	RON 4,650	Grand Hotel, Bucharest
2020	Nick Kenny	83.50	6 – 4	László Kádár	89.00	RON 40,000	RON 12,100	RON 5,500	Grand Hotel, Bucharest
2022	Patrik Kovács	79.11	5 – 0	Scott Marsh	71.71	€5,600	€1,600	€800	Grand Hotel, Bucharest
2023	László Kádár	81.98	5 – 4	Gary Stone	84.10	€6,400	€1,800	€900	Grand Hotel, Bucharest
2024	Alexander Merkx	90.24	5 – 3	Patrik Kovács	81.30	€6,400	€1,800	€900	Grand Hotel, Bucharest
2025	Brian Raman	89.38	5 – 2	(Greece) John Michael	84.79	€6,400	€1,800	€900	Grand Hotel, Bucharest
2026	(England) Clayden Smith		5 — 2	(Serbia) Mladen Radosavljevic		€6,400	€1,400	€900	Grand Hotel, Bucharest

=== Women's ===
Year	Champion	Av.	Score	Runner-Up	Av.	Prize Money			Venue
Year	Champion	Av.	Score	Runner-Up	Av.	Total	Ch.	R.-Up	Venue
2010	(Hungary) Zsófia Lázár-Köntös	n/a	5 – 3	(Belgium) Kathy Geeraerts	n/a	€1,000	€400	€200	Grand Hotel, Bucharest
2011	(England) Lorraine Winstanley	n/a	5 – 2	(England) Jane Shearing	n/a	€1,000	€400	€200	Grand Hotel, Bucharest
2012	(Belgium) Kathy Geeraerts	n/a	5 – 2	(Bulgaria) Anelia Eneva	n/a	€720	€300	€150	Grand Hotel, Bucharest
2013	(Bulgaria) Anelia Eneva	n/a	5 – 2	(Norway) Rachna David	n/a	€720	€300	€150	Grand Hotel, Bucharest
2016	(England) Rachel Brooks	n/a	5 – 3	(Netherlands) Marjolein Noijens	n/a	€720	€300	€150	Grand Hotel, Bucharest
2017	(Poland) Karolina Ratajska	65.91	5 – 3	(Netherlands) Anca Zijlstra	60.57	€720	€300	€150	Grand Hotel, Bucharest
2018	(Poland) Karolina Ratajska (2)	n/a	5 – 3	(England) Julie Thompson	n/a	€1,210	€500	€250	Grand Hotel, Bucharest
2019	Aileen de Graaf	n/a	5 – 2	Deta Hedman	n/a	RON 6,000	RON 2,400	RON 1,200	Grand Hotel, Bucharest
2020	Deta Hedman	77.20	5 – 2	Anca Zijlstra	66.40	RON 6,000	RON 2,400	RON 1,200	Grand Hotel, Bucharest
2022	Beau Greaves	88.41	5 – 0	Jo Clements	74.11	€2,400	€800	€400	Grand Hotel, Bucharest
2023	Beau Greaves (2)	91.65	5 – 0	Deta Hedman	65.63	€1,600	€500	€250	Grand Hotel, Bucharest
2024	Deta Hedman (2)	75.66	5 – 0	(Wales) Eve Watson	64.65	€1,600	€500	€250	Grand Hotel, Bucharest
2025	Aileen de Graaf (2)	73.67	5 – 4	Deta Hedman	73.30	€1,600	€500	€250	Grand Hotel, Bucharest
	(England) Deta Hedman		5 — 1	(Finland) Kirsi Viinikainen					Grand Hotel, Bucharest
