= 2001 Malta Open darts =

Malta Open

Tournament information
- Dates: 8 November 2001
- Country: Malta
- Organisation(s): BDO, WDF, MDA
- Winner's share: Lm 500

Champion(s)
- (England) Andy Keen

2001 Malta Open was a darts tournament part of the annual, Malta Open, which took place in Malta in 2001. Andy Keen's was the winner after having also won last year.

== Results ==
| Round | Player |
|---|---|
| Winner | (England) Andy Keen |
| Final | (Cyprus) Marios Demetriou |
| Semi-finals | (Cyprus) George Trypiniotis |
| Semi-finals | (Malta) Anthony Caruana |
| Quarter-finals | (Malta) Vincent Busuttil |
| Quarter-finals | (Malta) Godwin Cesareo |
| Quarter-finals | (Malta) Elton Agius |
| Quarter-finals | (Malta) Jeffrey Farrugia |
