= 2017 German Darts Open =

Tournament information
- Dates: 21–23 April 2017
- Venue: Saarlandhalle
- Location: Saarbrücken, Germany
- Organisation(s): Professional Darts Corporation (PDC)
- Format: Legs; First to 6 legs
- Prize fund: £135,000
- Winner's share: £25,000
- High checkout: 170 Joe Cullen

Champion(s)
- Peter Wright (SCO)

The 2017 German Darts Open was the third of twelve PDC European Tour events on the 2017 PDC Pro Tour. The tournament took place at Saarlandhalle, Saarbrücken, Germany, between 21–23 April 2017. It featured a field of 48 players and £135,000 in prize money, with £25,000 going to the winner.

Peter Wright won the tournament by defeating Benito van de Pas 6–5 in the final.

== Prize money ==
This is how the prize money is divided:

Stage (num. of players)		Prize money
Winner	(1)	£25,000
Runner-up	(1)	£10,000
Semi-finalists	(2)	£6,000
Quarter-finalists	(4)	£4,000
Third round losers	(8)	£3,000
Second round losers	(16)	£2,000
First round losers	(16)	£1,000
Total	£135,000	

== Qualification and format ==
The top 16 players from the PDC ProTour Order of Merit on 6 April automatically qualified for the event and were seeded in the second round.

The remaining 32 places went to players from five qualifying events - 18 from the UK Qualifier (held in Barnsley on 7 April), eight from the West/South European Qualifier, four from the Host Nation Qualifier (both held on 20 April), one from the Nordic & Baltic Qualifier (held on 18 February) and one from the East European Qualifier (held on 26 February).

The following players took part in the tournament:

Top 16
1. (Netherlands) Michael van Gerwen (quarter-finals)
2. (Scotland) Peter Wright (champion)
3. (Austria) Mensur Suljović (quarter-finals)
4. (Netherlands) Benito van de Pas (runner-up)
5. (Australia) Simon Whitlock (third round)
6. (England) Dave Chisnall (third round)
7. (England) Alan Norris (second round)
8. (England) Ian White (semi-finals)
9. (Belgium) Kim Huybrechts (second round)
10. (Wales) Gerwyn Price (quarter-finals)
11. (Netherlands) Jelle Klaasen (semi-finals)
12. (England) Michael Smith (second round)
13. (England) Joe Cullen (third round)
14. (England) Stephen Bunting (third round)
15. (Spain) Cristo Reyes (third round)
16. (England) Steve West (second round)

UK Qualifier
- (England) James Richardson (second round)
- (England) Mervyn King (third round)
- (Australia) Paul Nicholson (second round)
- (England) Nathan Aspinall (second round)
- (England) Mark Walsh (second round)
- (England) Brian Woods (first round)
- (England) Robbie Green (first round)
- (England) Darren Webster (second round)
- (England) Josh Payne (first round)
- (England) Peter Jacques (first round)
- (Scotland) Robert Thornton (first round)
- (England) Andy Hamilton (first round)
- (Scotland) John Henderson (first round)
- (England) Adam Hunt (third round)
- (England) Rob Cross (quarter-finals)
- (Republic of Ireland) Steve Lennon (first round)
- (Scotland) Jamie Bain (first round)
- (South Africa) Warrick Scheffer (second round)

West/South European Qualifier
- (Netherlands) Dirk van Duijvenbode (first round)
- (Austria) Zoran Lerchbacher (first round)
- (Belgium) Ronny Huybrechts (second round)
- (Netherlands) Jeffrey de Graaf (first round)
- (Netherlands) Christian Kist (second round)
- (Netherlands) Jimmy Hendriks (first round)
- (Netherlands) Vincent van der Voort (second round)
- (Belgium) Dimitri Van den Bergh (third round)

Host Nation Qualifier
- (Germany) Bernd Roith (second round)
- (Germany) René Berndt (first round)
- (Germany) Martin Schindler (first round)
- (Germany) Nico Blum (second round)

Nordic & Baltic Qualifier
- (Finland) Marko Kantele (first round)

East European Qualifier
- (Poland) Krzysztof Ratajski (second round)

== Draw ==
First round (best of 11 legs); 21 April
(Belgium) Ronny Huybrechts 88.41	6
(Austria) Zoran Lerchbacher 85.12	0
(England) Adam Hunt 93.04	6
(Germany) René Berndt 87.66	3
(Finland) Marko Kantele 82.06	3
(South Africa) Warrick Scheffer 86.60	6
(England) Mervyn King 97.16	6
(England) Robbie Green 94.24	5
(England) Darren Webster 97.15	6
(England) Peter Jacques 88.06	3
(Netherlands) Jeffrey de Graaf 80.83	1
(England) Rob Cross 95.54	6
(Australia) Paul Nicholson 92.68	6
(Germany) Martin Schindler 79.65	1
(Netherlands) Vincent van der Voort 85.60	6
(Netherlands) Dirk van Duijvenbode 89.98	5
(Scotland) Jamie Bain 84.71	3
(Poland) Krzysztof Ratajski 86.03	6
(England) Josh Payne 86.19	4
(Germany) Nico Blum 85.49	6
(Belgium) Dimitri Van den Bergh 91.09	6
(England) Andy Hamilton 86.69	0
(Scotland) John Henderson 83.20	3
(England) James Richardson 83.90	6
(Scotland) Robert Thornton 89.04	3
(England) Nathan Aspinall 94.27	6
(Netherlands) Christian Kist 84.22	6
(Republic of Ireland) Steve Lennon 82.93	4
(England) Mark Walsh 95.01	6
(Netherlands) Jimmy Hendriks 90.45	5
(England) Brian Woods 71.98	5
(Germany) Bernd Roith 79.16	6

Second round (best of 11 legs); 22 April
1	(Netherlands) Michael van Gerwen 102.48	6
(Belgium) Ronny Huybrechts 100.62	3
16	(England) Steve West 90.12	4
(England) Adam Hunt 87.30	6
8	(England) Ian White 103.15	6
(South Africa) Warrick Scheffer 96.22	3
9	(Belgium) Kim Huybrechts 95.04	3
(England) Mervyn King 97.42	6
5	(Australia) Simon Whitlock 96.53	6
(England) Darren Webster 94.62	3
12	(England) Michael Smith 87.88	2
(England) Rob Cross 90.18	6
4	(Netherlands) Benito van de Pas 87.16	6
(Australia) Paul Nicholson 86.92	3
13	(England) Joe Cullen 98.72	6
(Netherlands) Vincent van der Voort 93.73	4
2	(Scotland) Peter Wright 101.10	6
(Poland) Krzysztof Ratajski 87.12	1
15	(Spain) Cristo Reyes 97.24	6
(Germany) Nico Blum 87.96	1
7	(England) Alan Norris 78.79	2
(Belgium) Dimitri Van den Bergh 85.19	6
10	(Wales) Gerwyn Price 86.84	6
(England) James Richardson 89.57	5
6	(England) Dave Chisnall 104.86	6
(England) Nathan Aspinall 89.00	0
11	(Netherlands) Jelle Klaasen 94.93	6
(Netherlands) Christian Kist 81.83	0
3	(Austria) Mensur Suljović 98.90	6
(England) Mark Walsh 91.96	2
14	(England) Stephen Bunting 95.54	6
(Germany) Bernd Roith 89.28	1

Third round (best of 11 legs); 23 April
1	(Netherlands) van Gerwen 101.31	6
(England) Hunt 90.40	2
8	(England) White 106.55	6
(England) King 99.11	4
5	(Australia) Whitlock 99.22	3
(England) Cross 101.34	6
4	(Netherlands) van de Pas 94.44	6
13	(England) Cullen 91.66	5
2	(Scotland) Wright 96.58	6
15	(Spain) Reyes 95.96	5
(Belgium) Van den Bergh 88.14	4
10	(Wales) Price 93.88	6
6	(England) Chisnall 93.89	3
11	(Netherlands) Klaasen 92.17	6
3	(Austria) Suljović 103.66	6
14	(England) Bunting 91.63	0

Quarter-finals (best of 11 legs); 23 April
1	(Netherlands) van Gerwen 97.47	1
8	(England) White 104.01	6
(England) Cross 89.97	2
4	(Netherlands) van de Pas 103.79	6
2	(Scotland) Wright 104.21	6
10	(Wales) Price 96.16	2
11	(Netherlands) Klaasen 89.90	6
3	(Austria) Suljović 87.69	3

Semi-finals (best of 11 legs); 23 April
8	(England) White 95.13	3
4	(Netherlands) van de Pas 100.18	6
2	(Scotland) Wright 105.74	6
11	(Netherlands) Klaasen 96.17	2

Final (best of 11 legs); 23 April
4	(Netherlands) van de Pas 110.46	5
2	(Scotland) Wright 97.49	6
