= Romanian Classic =

Tournament information
- Venue: InterContinental Bucharest
- Location: Bucharest, Romania
- Established: 2014
- Organisation(s): World Darts Federation (WDF)
- Format: Legs
- Prize fund: €6,400 (open) €1,600 (women's)
- Month(s) Played: January

Current champion(s)
- Jenson Walker (ENG) (open); Irina Armstrong (GER) (women's)

The Romanian Classic is a darts tournament.

== List of winners ==
=== Men's ===
Year	Champion	Av.	Score	Runner-Up	Av.	Prize Money			Venue
Year	Champion	Av.	Score	Runner-Up	Av.	Total	Ch.	R.-Up	Venue
2014	Scott Mitchell	n/a	6 – 5	(England) Eddie White	n/a	€3,580	€1,500	€700	Grand Hotel, Bucharest
2015	Jamie Hughes	n/a	6 – 4	James Hurrell	n/a	€3,580	€1,500	€700	Grand Hotel, Bucharest
2016	Jamie Hughes (2)	n/a	6 – 1	(England) Alan Bell	n/a	€4,260	€1,500	€800	Grand Hotel, Bucharest
2017	Andy Baetens	85.65	6 – 3	(England) Scott Baker	85.62	€3,900	€1,300	€600	Grand Hotel, Bucharest
2018	(England) Daniel Day	n/a	6 – 5	(Netherlands) Wouter Vaes	n/a	€3,900	€1,300	€600	Grand Hotel, Bucharest
2019	John Michael	92.50	6 – 5	Derk Telnekes	94.24	RON 18,160	RON 6,000	RON 2,800	Grand Hotel, Bucharest
2020	Wayne Warren	82.20	6 – 3	(Spain) Martin Martí	75.80	RON 18,160	RON 6,000	RON 2,800	Grand Hotel, Bucharest
2022	Luke Littler	95.30	5 – 1	Jelle Klaasen	85.71	€3,020	€1,000	€500	Grand Hotel, Bucharest
2023	Gary Stone	85.02	5 – 3	Mark Graham	78.13	€3,000	€1,000	€500	Grand Hotel, Bucharest
2024	(Netherlands) Jimmy van Schie	93.82	5 – 3	Alexander Merkx	90.51	€6,400	€1,800	€900	Grand Hotel, Bucharest
2025	(England) David Pallett	80.98	5 – 3	(England) Brandon Stow	81.33	€6,400	€1,800	€900	Grand Hotel, Bucharest

=== Women's ===
Year	Champion	Av.	Score	Runner-Up	Av.	Prize Money			Venue
Year	Champion	Av.	Score	Runner-Up	Av.	Total	Ch.	R.-Up	Venue
2014	Amanda Harwood	n/a	5 – 0	(Bulgaria) Anelia Eneva	n/a	€740	€300	€150	Grand Hotel, Bucharest
2015	(Czech Republic) Hana Bělobrádková	n/a	5 – 1	(Czech Republic) Jana Kanovská	n/a	€740	€300	€150	Grand Hotel, Bucharest
2016	(Sweden) Anette Tillbom	n/a	5 – 4	(Czech Republic) Hana Bělobrádková	n/a	€740	€300	€150	Grand Hotel, Bucharest
2017	Maria O'Brien	64.32	5 – 3	Paula Jacklin	55.65	€740	€300	€150	Grand Hotel, Bucharest
2018	Deta Hedman	n/a	5 – 0	(Poland) Renata Słowikowska	n/a	€740	€300	€150	Grand Hotel, Bucharest
2019	(Poland) Karolina Ratajska	69.33	5 – 3	Margaret Sutton	70.67	RON 6,000	RON 2,400	RON 1,200	Grand Hotel, Bucharest
2020	Amanda Harwood (2)	75.50	5 – 1	Marjolein Noijens	66.70	RON 6,000	RON 2,400	RON 1,200	Grand Hotel, Bucharest
2022	Jitka Císařová	66.69	4 – 1	Roz Bulmer	66.03	€1,260	€500	€250	Grand Hotel, Bucharest
2023	Beau Greaves	79.11	4 – 0	Kirsty Hutchinson	71.60	€1,000	€400	€200	Grand Hotel, Bucharest
2024	Deta Hedman (2)	89.46	5 – 0	Lorraine Hyde	71.81	€1,600	€500	€250	Grand Hotel, Bucharest
2025	Lerena Rietbergen	70.96	5 – 2	Sophie McKinlay	71.41	€1,600	€500	€250	Grand Hotel, Bucharest

== Tournament records ==
- Most wins: Jamie Hughes 2 (2015 and 2016)
- Most finals: Jamie Hughes 2 (2015 and 2016)
- Most semi-finals: Jamie Hughes, James Hurrell
- Youngest winner: age 15 Luke Littler
- Oldest winner: age 43 Scott Mitchell

== See also ==
- List of BDO ranked tournaments
- List of WDF tournaments
