= 2002 Malta Open darts =

Malta Open

Tournament information
- Dates: 30 November 2002
- Country: Malta
- Organisation(s): BDO, WDF, MDA
- Winner's share: Lm 500

Champion(s)
- Andy Keen

2002 Malta Open was a darts tournament part of the annual, Malta Open, which took place in Malta in 2002. This marked Andy Keen's 3rd win in a row of his 4 year win streak.

== Results ==
Round	Player
Winner	(Malta) Andy Keen
Final	(England) Roy Turner
Semi-finals	(Germany) Colin Rice
Semi-finals	(Wales) Derek Williams
Quarter-finals	(Cyprus) George Trypiniotis
Quarter-finals	(England) Matt Clark
Quarter-finals	(Malta) Joe Caruana
Quarter-finals	(Malta) Mario Camilleri
