= Jeffrey Van Egdom =

Belgian darts player

Personal information
- Born: 28 August 1987 (age 39) Bonheiden, Belgium
- Home town: Itegem, Belgium

Sport
- Sport: Darts
- Playing since: 2014
- Darts: 22 Gram
- Laterality: Right-handed
- Walk-on music: "Melody" by Dimitri Vegas & Like Mike

Organisation (see split in darts)
- BDO: 2016–
- PDC: 2020–

WDF major events – best performances
- World Championship: Last 32: 2019
- World Masters: Last 144: 2016, 2018
- Finder Masters: Last 24 Group: 2018

Jeffrey Van Egdom (born 28 August 1987) is a Belgian professional darts player.

== Career ==
In 2018, Van Egdom qualified for the 2019 BDO World Darts Championship as the number 23rd seed, where he played Scott Waites of England in the first round and lost 1–3.

Van Egdom made his PDC European Tour debut at the 2020 Belgian Darts Championship after coming through the Host Nation Qualifier.

== World Championship results ==
=== BDO ===
- 2019: 1st Round (lost to Scott Waites 1–3)
