= Karolina Ratajska =

Polish darts player (born 1987)

Personal information
- Born: 21 July 1987 (age 39) Gniezno, Poland
- Home town: Warsaw, Poland

Sport
- Sport: Darts
- Playing since: 2007
- Laterality: Right-handed
- Walk-on music: "Nic dwa razy" by Maanam

Organisation (see split in darts)
- BDO: 2017–2020
- WDF: 2017–2020, 2025–present
- Current world ranking: (WDF W) NR (17 August 2026)

WDF major events – best performances
- World Championship: Last 16: 2019
- World Masters: Last 24: 2017

Other tournament wins
- Years
Police Masters	2018
Polish Ch'ship	2017, 2018, 2019, 2022
Romanian Open	2017, 2018
Romanian Classic	2019
Medal record
Women's Darts
Representing Poland
EDF European Ch'ship
Gold medal – first place	2018 Podčetrtek	Women's cricket
Gold medal – first place	2019 Podčetrtek	Women's cricket
Gold medal – first place	2019 Podčetrtek	Women's doubles
Silver medal – second place	2018 Podčetrtek	Mixed doubles
Bronze medal – third place	2019 Podčetrtek	Mixed doubles

Karolina Ratajska (née Podgórska; born 21 July 1987) is a Polish darts player who competes in World Darts Federation (WDF) and Professional Darts Corporation (PDC) events. She is a four-time Polish Women's Champion and first and only Polish women's darts player to qualify for the BDO World Darts Championship.

Her husband is the most successful Polish darts player, Krzysztof Ratajski.

== Career ==
In 2018, she qualified for the 2019 BDO World Darts Championship as a qualifier, where she played ten-time champion Trina Gulliver in the first round, but lost by two sets to one.

== World Championship results ==
=== BDO ===
- 2019: First round (lost to Trina Gulliver 1–2) (sets)

== Performance timeline ==
Tournament	2017	2018	2019
BDO Televised women's events
World Championship	DNQ		1R
World Masters	4R	2R	3R
