= 2016 PDC World Darts Championship =

2015/16 William Hill World Darts Championship

Tournament information
- Dates: 17 December 2015 – 3 January 2016
- Venue: Alexandra Palace
- Location: London, England
- Organisation(s): Professional Darts Corporation (PDC)
- Format: Sets; Final – best of 13
- Prize fund: £1,500,000
- Winner's share: £300,000
- Nine-dart finish: Gary Anderson
- High checkout: 170; Gary Anderson (x2); Rowby-John Rodriguez; Phil Taylor; Jelle Klaasen; Michael van Gerwen

Champion(s)
- Gary Anderson (SCO)

The 2016 PDC World Darts Championship (known for sponsorship reasons as the 2015/16 William Hill World Darts Championship) was the twenty-third World Championship organised by the Professional Darts Corporation since it separated from the British Darts Organisation. The event was held at the Alexandra Palace, London, from 17 December 2015 to 3 January 2016.

Gary Anderson was the defending champion, having won his first world title in the 2015 final by beating 16-times champion Phil Taylor 7–6. He retained his title by beating Adrian Lewis 7–5. He also threw a nine-dart finish in his semi-final against Jelle Klaasen to add a bonus £15,000 to his winnings, and hit two maximum checkouts of 170 in the progress.

There were 654 maximums thrown during the event, beating the record of 625 from the previous year. 34 of these were produced in the final, which was the record for a professional match for a year until the 2017 World Darts Championship final produced 42.

Three-time world champion John Part was a notable absentee in this tournament, having failed to qualify for the first time since joining the PDC in 1997.

== Format ==
The tournament featured 72 players. The top 32 players on the PDC Order of Merit on 30 November 2015 (after the Players Championship Finals) were seeded for the tournament. They were joined by the 16 highest non-qualified players from the Pro Tour Order of Merit, based on the events played on the 2015 PDC Pro Tour.

These 48 players were joined by two PDPA qualifiers (as determined at a PDPA Qualifying event held in Coventry on 30 November 2015), and 22 international players: the four highest names on the European Order of Merit not already qualified, and 18 further international qualifiers determined by the PDC and PDPA. Some of the international players, such as the four from the European Order of Merit, and the top American and Australian players entered straight into the first round, while others, having won qualifying events in their countries, were entered into the preliminary round.

Thanawat Gaweenuntawong became the first player from Thailand to play at a World Darts Championship.

== Prize money ==
The 2016 World Championship featured a prize fund of at least £1,500,000 – an increase of £250,000 from the 2015 tournament.

The prize money was allocated as follows:

Position (num. of players)		Prize money (Total: £1,500,000)
Winner	(1)	£300,000
Runner-up	(1)	£150,000
Semi-finalists	(2)	£70,000
Quarter-finalists	(4)	£35,000
Third round losers	(8)	£22,000
Second round losers	(16)	£15,000
First round losers	(32)	£10,000
Preliminary round losers	(8)	£4,250
Nine-dart finish	(1)	£15,000

== Qualifiers ==
Order of Merit

1. (Netherlands) Michael van Gerwen
2. (Scotland) Gary Anderson
3. (England) Phil Taylor
4. (Scotland) Peter Wright
5. (England) Adrian Lewis
6. (Scotland) Robert Thornton
7. (England) James Wade
8. (England) Michael Smith
9. (England) Ian White
10. (Australia) Simon Whitlock
11. (England) Terry Jenkins
12. (Belgium) Kim Huybrechts
13. (England) Dave Chisnall
14. (England) Mervyn King
15. (Netherlands) Vincent van der Voort
16. (Netherlands) Raymond van Barneveld
17. (England) Stephen Bunting
18. (Northern Ireland) Brendan Dolan
19. (Netherlands) Jelle Klaasen
20. (England) Justin Pipe
21. (Austria) Mensur Suljović
22. (Wales) Mark Webster
23. (England) Jamie Caven
24. (Netherlands) Benito van de Pas
25. (England) Steve Beaton
26. (England) Wes Newton
27. (England) Andy Hamilton
28. (England) Andrew Gilding
29. (England) Dean Winstanley
30. (England) Kevin Painter
31. (Wales) Jamie Lewis
32. (Scotland) John Henderson

Pro Tour

1. (England) Alan Norris
2. (Wales) Gerwyn Price
3. (England) Joe Murnan
4. (Northern Ireland) Daryl Gurney
5. (England) Keegan Brown
6. (Germany) Max Hopp
7. (Austria) Rowby-John Rodriguez
8. (Netherlands) Christian Kist
9. (Spain) Cristo Reyes
10. (England) David Pallett
11. (Belgium) Ronny Huybrechts
12. (Netherlands) Dirk van Duijvenbode
13. (Netherlands) Jeffrey de Zwaan
14. (Australia) Kyle Anderson
15. (England) Joe Cullen
16. (England) Darren Webster

European Pro Tour

1. (Belgium) Dimitri Van den Bergh
2. (Netherlands) Jan Dekker
3. (Germany) Jyhan Artut
4. (Netherlands) Jermaine Wattimena

PDPA Qualifier
First round qualifier

- (England) Ricky Evans

Preliminary round qualifier

- (England) Andy Boulton

International qualifiers
First round qualifiers

- (New Zealand) Koha Kokiri
- (Australia) Laurence Ryder
- (United States) Darin Young

Preliminary round qualifiers

- (Germany) René Eidams
- Thanawat Gaweenuntawong
- (Netherlands) Sven Groen
- (Denmark) Per Laursen
- (Singapore) Paul Lim
- (Republic of Ireland) Mick McGowan
- (Greece) John Michael
- (Japan) Keita Ono
- Aleksandr Oreshkin
- (Austria) Michael Rasztovits
- (South Africa) Warrick Scheffer
- (China) Sun Qiang
- (New Zealand) Rob Szabo
- (Philippines) Alex Tagarao
- (Finland) Kim Viljanen

== Results ==
=== Preliminary round ===
The format in the preliminary round was extended from a best-of-seven legs to a best-of-three sets format. One match was played in the first eight sessions with the winners playing their first-round matches at the end of the session.

Av.	Player	Score	Player	Av.
83.03	Andy Boulton	2–1	Per Laursen	79.27
64.73	Sun Qiang	0–2	Mick McGowan	74.19
63.64	Thanawat Gaweenuntawong	0–2	René Eidams	69.25
87.69	Kim Viljanen	2–1	Sven Groen	84.11
91.79	Keita Ono	2–0	Alex Tagarao	77.40
78.83	Michael Rasztovits	0–2	Rob Szabo	78.34
89.33	Aleksandr Oreshkin	2–1	Paul Lim	88.26
77.12	Warrick Scheffer	0–2	John Michael	88.01

=== Main draw ===
==== Finals ====
Quarter-finals (best of 9 sets); 1 January
16	(Netherlands) Raymond van Barneveld 99.44	5
8	(England) Michael Smith 97.61	4
5	(England) Adrian Lewis 102.51	5
4	(Scotland) Peter Wright 103.10	2
2	(Scotland) Gary Anderson 105.25	5
7	(England) James Wade 88.05	1
(England) Alan Norris 98.33	4
19	(Netherlands) Jelle Klaasen 99.35	5

Semi-finals (best of 11 sets); 2 January
16	(Netherlands) Raymond van Barneveld 94.07	3
5	(England) Adrian Lewis 99.55	6
2	(Scotland) Gary Anderson 107.32	6
19	(Netherlands) Jelle Klaasen 94.68	0

Final (best of 13 sets); 3 January
5	(England) Adrian Lewis 100.23	5
2	(Scotland) Gary Anderson 99.26	7

==== Rounds 1–4 ====
First round (best of 5 sets); 17–23 December
1	(Netherlands) Michael van Gerwen 99.03	3
(Germany) René Eidams 90.48	2
32	(Scotland) John Henderson 81.06	1
(England) Darren Webster 87.83	3
16	(Netherlands) Raymond van Barneveld 91.34	3
(Netherlands) Dirk van Duijvenbode 79.77	0
17	(England) Stephen Bunting 86.72	3
(Germany) Jyhan Artut 81.08	0
8	(England) Michael Smith 95.31	3
(Netherlands) Jeffrey de Zwaan 96.20	2
25	(England) Steve Beaton 95.87	3
(New Zealand) Koha Kokiri 93.22	0
9	(England) Ian White 92.43	1
(Belgium) Dimitri Van den Bergh 95.22	3
24	(Netherlands) Benito van de Pas 87.98	3
(Germany) Max Hopp 89.49	1
5	(England) Adrian Lewis 99.53	3
(Netherlands) Jan Dekker 89.68	0
28	(England) Andrew Gilding 90.91	3
(Wales) Gerwyn Price 83.86	0
12	(Belgium) Kim Huybrechts 92.66	2
(England) David Pallett 91.43	3
21	(Austria) Mensur Suljović 99.44	3
(Netherlands) Jermaine Wattimena 87.10	1
4	(Scotland) Peter Wright 95.91	3
(England) Keegan Brown 83.61	0
29	(England) Dean Winstanley 88.00	2
(Belgium) Ronny Huybrechts 91.14	3
13	(England) Dave Chisnall 99.37	3
(Austria) Rowby-John Rodriguez 89.37	0
20	(England) Justin Pipe 75.55	0
(Netherlands) Christian Kist 93.95	3
2	(Scotland) Gary Anderson 99.55	3
(England) Andy Boulton 85.30	0
31	(Wales) Jamie Lewis 90.34	1
(Northern Ireland) Daryl Gurney 94.12	3
15	(Netherlands) Vincent van der Voort 95.70	3
(Australia) Laurence Ryder 81.37	0
18	(Northern Ireland) Brendan Dolan 87.19	0
(Australia) Kyle Anderson 90.64	3
7	(England) James Wade 95.77	3
(Greece) John Michael 84.26	0
26	(England) Wes Newton 77.80	3
(Spain) Cristo Reyes 87.05	1
10	(Australia) Simon Whitlock 92.85	2
(England) Ricky Evans 93.48	3
23	(England) Jamie Caven 96.55	3
(New Zealand) Rob Szabo 86.50	0
6	(Scotland) Robert Thornton 88.66	0
(England) Alan Norris 96.88	3
27	(England) Andy Hamilton 86.75	2
(England) Joe Murnan 86.88	3
11	(England) Terry Jenkins 89.56	3
(United States) Darin Young 83.49	1
22	(Wales) Mark Webster 89.58	3
(Republic of Ireland) Mick McGowan 85.88	0
3	(England) Phil Taylor 98.39	3
(Japan) Keita Ono 83.49	0
30	(England) Kevin Painter 93.43	3
(Finland) Kim Viljanen 80.63	0
14	(England) Mervyn King 97.84	3
(Russia) Aleksandr Oreshkin 86.14	2
19	(Netherlands) Jelle Klaasen 102.54	3
(England) Joe Cullen 93.86	0

Second round (best of 7 sets); 26–29 December
1	(Netherlands) van Gerwen 109.23	4
(England) D. Webster 94.90	0
16	(Netherlands) van Barneveld 94.63	4
17	(England) Bunting 98.18	3
8	(England) Smith 100.30	4
25	(England) Beaton 91.96	2
(Belgium) Van den Bergh 92.51	2
24	(Netherlands) van de Pas 95.17	4
5	(England) A. Lewis 103.52	4
28	(England) Gilding 82.70	0
(England) Pallett 92.21	3
21	(Austria) Suljović 91.04	4
4	(Scotland) Wright 99.09	4
(Belgium) R. Huybrechts 92.07	0
13	(England) Chisnall 102.85	4
(Netherlands) Kist 95.92	1
2	(Scotland) G. Anderson 99.44	4
(Northern Ireland) Gurney 96.04	1
15	(Netherlands) van der Voort 95.12	4
(Australia) K. Anderson 92.23	2
7	(England) Wade 92.84	4
26	(England) Newton 84.89	0
(England) Evans 82.95	0
23	(England) Caven 91.81	4
(England) Norris 94.80	4
(England) Murnan 89.76	1
11	(England) Jenkins 92.15	0
22	(Wales) M. Webster 93.37	4
3	(England) Taylor 92.91	4
30	(England) Painter 92.19	1
14	(England) King 88.71	2
19	(Netherlands) Klaasen 93.56	4

Third round (best of 7 sets); 29–30 December
1	(Netherlands) van Gerwen 105.78	3
16	(Netherlands) van Barneveld 100.44	4
8	(England) Smith 101.56	4
24	(Netherlands) van de Pas 83.14	0
5	(England) A. Lewis 98.70	4
21	(Austria) Suljović 93.93	0
4	(Scotland) Wright 103.69	4
13	(England) Chisnall 102.26	3
2	(Scotland) G. Anderson 101.58	4
15	(Netherlands) van der Voort 95.13	0
7	(England) Wade 93.89	4
23	(England) Caven 88.31	1
(England) Norris 95.43	4
22	(Wales) M. Webster 96.06	1
3	(England) Taylor 100.03	3
19	(Netherlands) Klaasen 102.52	4

Quarter-finals (best of 9 sets); 1 January
16	(Netherlands) van Barneveld 99.44	5
8	(England) Smith 97.61	4
5	(England) A. Lewis 102.51	5
4	(Scotland) Wright 103.10	2
2	(Scotland) G. Anderson 105.25	5
7	(England) Wade 88.05	1
(England) Norris 98.33	4
19	(Netherlands) Klaasen 99.35	5

== Final ==
Final: Best of 13 sets. Referee: George Noble. Alexandra Palace, London, England, 3 January 2016.
(5) Adrian Lewis (England)	5 – 7	(Scotland) Gary Anderson (2)
3 – 1, 0 – 3, 1 – 3, 3 – 2, 3 – 2, 1 – 3, 1 – 3, 0 – 3, 3 – 0, 0 – 3, 3 – 0, 1 – 3
100.23	Average (3 darts)	99.26
19	180 scores	15
131	Highest checkout	170
38% (19/50)	Checkout summary	43% (26/60)

== Statistics ==
Player	Eliminated	Played	Sets Won	Sets Lost	Legs Won	Legs Lost	Leg Breaks	100+	140+	170+	180s	High checkout	Checkout Av.%	Average
(Scotland) Gary Anderson	Winner	6	29	7	95	45	44	185	102	8	51	170	42.15	102.07
(England) Adrian Lewis	Runner-up	6	27	12	93	64	39	171	106	8	60	164	45.95	100.67
(Netherlands) Raymond van Barneveld	Semi-finals	5	19	16	74	72	26	231	125	2	27	161	38.56	96.46
(Netherlands) Jelle Klaasen	Semi-finals	5	16	15	68	62	31	134	70	5	48	170	42.36	99.49
(Scotland) Peter Wright	Quarter-finals	4	13	8	51	40	20	111	54	1	38	131	40.16	100.45
(England) Michael Smith	Quarter-finals	4	15	9	55	44	20	110	63	4	36	140	43.65	98.70
(England) James Wade	Quarter-finals	4	12	6	40	32	11	113	53	1	13	141	43.48	92.64
(England) Alan Norris	Quarter-finals	4	15	7	51	40	23	92	66	0	37	123	43.97	96.36
(England) Phil Taylor	Third round	3	10	5	36	26	18	82	49	1	13	170	37.11	97.11
(Wales) Mark Webster	Third round	3	8	4	30	22	11	62	28	1	13	130	36.14	93.00
(England) Dave Chisnall	Third round	3	10	5	39	31	15	85	52	0	25	160	42.39	101.49
(Netherlands) Michael van Gerwen	Third round	3	10	6	38	24	15	83	33	7	24	170	52.05	104.68
(Austria) Mensur Suljović	Third round	3	7	8	29	33	9	80	40	2	8	160	37.66	94.80
(Netherlands) Vincent van der Voort	Third round	3	7	6	26	24	9	66	33	0	15	134	37.68	95.32
(England) Jamie Caven	Third round	3	8	4	30	16	11	64	18	1	9	127	41.67	92.22
(Netherlands) Benito van de Pas	Third round	3	7	7	31	29	11	72	35	5	5	148	33.70	88.76
(England) Mervyn King	Second round	2	5	6	23	22	8	48	35	0	13	122	31.94	93.28
(England) Kevin Painter	Second round	2	4	4	17	15	9	34	23	1	10	110	38.64	92.81
(England) Andrew Gilding	Second round	2	3	4	11	15	4	24	13	0	5	132	47.83	86.81
(Belgium) Ronny Huybrechts	Second round	2	3	6	18	23	6	49	24	0	7	164	40.00	91.61
(England) David Pallett	Second round	2	6	6	27	22	10	55	43	0	13	132	31.76	91.82
(England) Terry Jenkins	Second round	2	3	5	15	20	5	43	22	0	12	121	35.71	90.86
(England) Joe Murnan	Second round	2	4	6	24	26	8	49	35	0	9	112	32.43	88.32
(England) Darren Webster	Second round	2	3	5	11	18	4	42	25	0	5	116	34.38	91.37
(England) Wes Newton	Second round	2	3	5	12	19	5	33	9	0	6	161	33.33	81.35
(England) Stephen Bunting	Second round	2	6	4	23	18	6	56	16	0	18	88	40.35	92.45
(Australia) Kyle Anderson	Second round	2	5	4	19	21	4	38	34	0	10	128	27.94	91.44
(Belgium) Dimitri Van den Bergh	Second round	2	5	5	21	22	9	45	22	4	8	122	41.18	93.87
(England) Steve Beaton	Second round	2	5	4	17	19	6	45	19	0	7	164	40.48	93.92
(Northern Ireland) Daryl Gurney	Second round	2	4	5	20	20	8	46	23	0	14	76	35.09	95.08
(Netherlands) Christian Kist	Second round	2	4	4	16	16	6	45	25	1	5	116	36.36	94.94
(England) Ricky Evans	Second round	2	3	6	16	24	7	42	16	0	10	130	44.44	88.22
(Scotland) Robert Thornton	First round	1	0	3	3	9	2	14	8	0	0	121	33.33	88.66
(England) Ian White	First round	1	1	3	6	11	3	27	9	0	3	81	35.29	92.43
(Australia) Simon Whitlock	First round	1	2	3	12	15	4	28	25	0	8	121	28.57	92.85
(Belgium) Kim Huybrechts	First round	1	2	3	8	12	3	28	14	0	4	106	32.00	92.66
(Northern Ireland) Brendan Dolan	First round	1	0	3	5	9	0	18	7	0	1	126	22.73	87.19
(England) Justin Pipe	First round	1	0	3	2	9	0	9	4	0	0	104	50.00	75.55
(England) Andy Hamilton	First round	1	2	3	13	16	6	26	19	0	3	73	34.21	86.75
(England) Dean Winstanley	First round	1	2	3	11	14	3	33	13	0	9	120	32.35	88.00
(Wales) Jamie Lewis	First round	1	1	3	6	10	2	26	5	0	3	78	46.15	90.34
(Scotland) John Henderson	First round	1	1	3	6	10	2	13	12	0	2	80	46.15	81.06
(Wales) Gerwyn Price	First round	1	0	3	3	9	0	14	9	0	1	54	23.08	83.86
(England) Keegan Brown	First round	1	0	3	2	9	1	5	4	0	5	72	25.00	83.61
(Austria) Rowby-John Rodriguez	First round	1	0	3	6	9	2	18	6	1	3	170	35.29	89.37
(Germany) Max Hopp	First round	1	1	3	7	11	1	17	19	0	4	81	25.00	89.49
(Spain) Cristo Reyes	First round	1	1	3	7	9	4	22	9	0	4	105	26.92	87.05
(England) Joe Cullen	First round	1	0	3	2	9	1	11	7	0	1	40	33.33	93.86
(Germany) Jyhan Artut	First round	1	0	3	3	9	1	10	8	0	1	76	16.67	81.08
(Netherlands) Dirk van Duijvenbode	First round	1	0	3	4	9	1	11	9	0	1	110	50.00	79.77
(Netherlands) Jeffrey de Zwaan	First round	1	2	3	12	13	3	43	14	0	6	128	30.77	96.20
(England) Andy Boulton	First round	2	2	4	10	15	3	27	21	0	0	83	27.03	84.17
(Netherlands) Jan Dekker	First round	1	0	3	5	9	2	14	4	0	0	114	83.33	89.68
(Netherlands) Jermaine Wattimena	First round	1	1	3	6	11	0	18	12	0	0	70	66.67	87.10
(United States) Darin Young	First round	1	1	3	8	11	3	25	9	0	2	100	53.33	83.49
(Greece) John Michael	First round	2	2	3	10	10	4	23	17	0	0	161	28.57	86.14
(Republic of Ireland) Mick McGowan	First round	2	2	3	12	10	4	25	11	0	1	80	36.36	80.04
(Finland) Kim Viljanen	First round	2	2	4	10	14	5	28	9	0	3	92	52.63	84.16
(New Zealand) Koha Kokiri	First round	1	0	3	5	9	3	19	5	0	3	80	22.73	93.22
(Australia) Laurence Ryder	First round	1	0	3	2	9	0	15	4	0	1	86	50.00	81.37
(New Zealand) Rob Szabo	First round	2	2	3	8	13	3	22	8	0	1	70	34.78	82.42
(Germany) René Eidams	First round	2	4	3	14	14	6	40	8	0	3	122	31.82	79.87
(Japan) Keita Ono	First round	2	2	3	7	10	4	18	9	0	0	86	46.67	87.64
(Russia) Aleksandr Oreshkin	First round	2	4	4	15	18	5	40	13	0	2	134	40.54	87.74
(Denmark) Per Laursen	Prelim. Round	1	1	2	6	8	1	18	6	0	1	80	37.50	79.27
(Netherlands) Sven Groen	Prelim. Round	1	1	2	5	8	2	24	6	0	0	110	33.33	84.11
(Austria) Michael Rasztovits	Prelim. Round	1	0	2	4	6	2	15	8	0	0	121	23.53	78.83
(Singapore) Paul Lim	Prelim. Round	1	1	2	6	8	2	21	8	0	1	117	28.57	88.26
(China) Sun Qiang	Prelim. Round	1	0	2	1	6	0	12	1	0	0	48	11.11	64.73
(Philippines) Alex Tagarao	Prelim. Round	1	0	2	1	6	1	7	2	0	1	24	25.00	77.40
(South Africa) Warrick Scheffer	Prelim. Round	1	0	2	1	6	1	10	3	0	1	10	7.69	77.12
(Thailand) Thanawat Gaweenuntawong	Prelim. Round	1	0	2	3	6	2	10	4	0	1	58	12.00	63.64

== Representation from different countries ==
This table shows the number of players by country in the World Championship, the total number including the preliminary round.

	(England) ENG	(Netherlands) NED	(Scotland) SCO	(Australia) AUS	(Belgium) BEL	(Wales) WAL	(Austria) AUT	(Germany) GER	(Northern Ireland) NIR	(New Zealand) NZL	(Spain) SPA	(Thailand) THA	(Greece) GRE	(South Africa) RSA	(Russia) RUS	(United States) USA	(Japan) JPN	(Finland) FIN	(Philippines) PHI	(Denmark) DEN	(Singapore) SIN	(China) CHN	(Republic of Ireland) IRE	Total
Final	1	–	1	–	–	–	–	–	–	–	–	–	–	–	–	–	–	–	–	–	–	–	–	2
Semis	1	2	1	–	–	–	–	–	–	–	–	–	–	–	–	–	–	–	–	–	–	–	–	4
Quarters	4	2	2	–	–	–	–	–	–	–	–	–	–	–	–	–	–	–	–	–	–	–	–	8
Round 3	7	5	2	–	–	1	1	–	–	–	–	–	–	–	–	–	–	–	–	–	–	–	–	16
Round 2	18	6	2	1	2	1	1	–	1	–	–	–	–	–	–	–	–	–	–	–	–	–	–	32
Round 1	25	10	4	3	3	3	2	3	2	2	1	–	1	–	1	1	1	1	–	–	–	–	1	64
Prelim.	1	1	–	–	–	–	1	1	–	1	–	1	1	1	1	–	1	1	1	1	1	1	1	16
Total	25	11	4	3	3	3	3	3	2	2	1	1	1	1	1	1	1	1	1	1	1	1	1	72

== Broadcasting ==
The tournament was available in the following countries on these channels:

Country	Channel
United Kingdom (Republic of Ireland) Ireland	Sky Sports Darts †
Netherlands	RTL 7
Germany	Sport1/Sport1+
Denmark	TV3 Sport1/TV3 Sport2
Australia; Italy	Fox Sports
New Zealand	Sky Sport (New Zealand)
Czech Republic; Slovakia; Hungary	Nova Sport 2
Arab world	OSN
United States	ESPN 3
(Bulgaria) Bulgaria; Scandinavia; Baltic states	Viasat
Belgium	Eleven Sport Network

† Sky Sports F1 was renamed as Sky Sports Darts for the duration of the tournament.
