= 2010 Romanian International Darts Open =

The 2010 Romanian International Darts Open was the first edition of Romanian International Darts Open, organised by the Romanian Darts Federation. The tournament took place 9–11 October 2010 in Bucharest, Romania. The winner was Nándor Bezzeg who beat Mirianthous Marios, in the final, by 6 legs to 0.

== Men's tournament ==
Last 32; Best of 7 legs Losers 20 EUR
(Romania) George Peicea	4
(Romania) Raul Szabo	2
(Cyprus) Floros Oikonomoy	0
(Cyprus) Ermos Korradoy	4
(Romania) Dragos Radulescu	0
(Greece) John Michael	4
(Romania) Valentin Antochi	0
(Romania) Alexandru Stoian	4
(Greece) George Portokalis	4
(Netherlands) Ian Hoeve	2
(Romania) Nicolae Cecati	2
(Romania) Razvan Negot	4
(Romania) Victor Toma	0
(Hungary) Nandor Bezzeg	4
(Romania) Bogdan Atudosiei	0
(Bulgaria) Marin Marinov	4
(Romania) Dragos Dumitrescu	0
(Hungary) Elod Zsolt Nagy	4
(Romania) Sorin Sodolescu	2
(Cyprus) Mirianthous Marios	4
(Cyprus) Charis Nicolaoy	3
(Cyprus) Stylianidis Christakis	4
(Slovakia) Milos Bedy	4
(Romania) Toma Georgescu	1
(Bulgaria) Ivan Neikov	4
(Romania) Petre Serbanescu	0
(Romania) Bogdan Marinescu	4
(Cyprus) Iosif Antros	2
(Romania) Cristian Cimpoca	4
(Bulgaria) Nikolai Berov	3
(Romania) Mihai Coltan	1
(Romania) Costin Cavasi	4

Last 16; Best of 7 legs Losers 50 EUR
(Romania) George Peicea	3
(Cyprus) Ermos Korradoy	4
(Greece) John Michael	4
(Romania) Alexandru Stoian	0
(Greece) George Portokalis	2
(Romania) Razvan Negot	4
(Hungary) Bezzeg Nándor	4
(Bulgaria) Marin Marinov	0
(Hungary) Elod Zsolt Nagy	2
(Cyprus) Mirianthous Marios	4
(Cyprus) Stylianidis Christakis	4
(Slovakia) Milos Bedy	3
(Bulgaria) Ivan Neikov	4
(Romania) Bogdan Marinescu	0
(Romania) Cristian Cimpoca	4
(Romania) Costin Cavasi	0

Quarter-Finals; Best of 7 legs Losers 150 EUR
(Cyprus) Ermos Korradoy	4
(Greece) John Michael	2
(Romania) Razvan Negot	2
(Hungary) Bezzeg Nándor	4
(Cyprus) Mirianthous Marios	4
(Cyprus) Stylianidis Christiakis	2
(Bulgaria) Ivan Neikov	4
(Romania) Cristian Cimpoca	2

Semifinals; Best of 9 legs Losers 400 EUR
(Cyprus) Ermos Korradoy	2
(Hungary) Bezzeg Nándor	5
(Cyprus) Mirianthous Marios	5
(Bulgaria) Ivan Neikov	4

Final; Best of 11 legs Winner 2.500 EUR; Runner-up 1.000 EUR
(Hungary) Bezzeg Nándor	6
(Cyprus) Mirianthous Marios	0
