= 2017 PDC World Darts Championship =

2016/17 William Hill World Darts Championship

Tournament information
- Dates: 15 December 2016 – 2 January 2017
- Venue: Alexandra Palace
- Location: London, England
- Organisation(s): Professional Darts Corporation (PDC)
- Format: Sets; Final – first to 7
- Prize fund: £1,650,000
- Winner's share: £350,000
- High checkout: 170; Michael van Gerwen; Simon Whitlock

Champion(s)
- Michael van Gerwen (NED)

The 2017 PDC World Darts Championship (known for sponsorship reasons as the 2016/17 William Hill World Darts Championship) was the twenty-fourth World Championship organised by the Professional Darts Corporation since it separated from the British Darts Organisation. The event took place at Alexandra Palace in London from 15 December 2016 to 2 January 2017.

Phil Taylor made a twenty-eighth successive appearance at a World Championship (including the BDO version), equalling the record of John Lowe.

For the first time in the history of the World Darts Championship (PDC and BDO), no Englishman progressed to the semi-finals. It was also the first time since 2009 that the final was contested by the top 2 seeds.

Michael van Gerwen set a new record for the highest World Darts Championship 3-dart average (114.05) in his semi-final victory over Raymond van Barneveld, breaking a 15-year record that had been held by Phil Taylor since 2002 (111.21); Van Barneveld himself set a new record for the highest losing 3-dart average (109.34) in the same tie, just 5 days after Cristo Reyes had broken the record in his second-round match (106.07), also against Van Gerwen.

Van Gerwen won his second World Championship title by defeating two-times defending champion Gary Anderson 7–3 in the final. The match also featured 42 180s, which is a record for a match commissioned by the Professional Darts Cooperation.

== Format ==
The field consisted of 72 players, including 16 in a preliminary round. Therefore, 64 players were entered into Round 1. The schedule was announced on 15 July 2016.

The 72 players consist of:

- Top 32 players in the PDC Main Order of Merit
- Top 16 Pro Tour Order of Merit players
- Top 4 European players from the Pro Tour Order of Merit
- 16 International qualifiers
- 4 PDPA qualifiers

== Prize money ==
The prize money was £1,650,000 in total. The winner's prize money was increased from £300,000 to £350,000. Prize money for a nine-dart finish was originally set at £5,000, but the PDC increased it to £25,000 due to 'the stature of the tournament', though none were thrown.

Position (num. of players)		Prize money (Total: £1,650,000)
Winner	(1)	£350,000
Runner-up	(1)	£160,000
Semi-finalists	(2)	£80,000
Quarter-finalists	(4)	£38,000
Third round losers	(8)	£25,000
Second round losers	(16)	£17,000
First round losers	(32)	£10,000
Preliminary round losers	(8)	£4,500
Nine-dart finish	(0)	£25,000

== Qualifiers ==
The draw was made on 28 November live on Sky Sports News. The preliminary round draw was made the previous night.

Order of Merit

1. (Netherlands) Michael van Gerwen
2. (Scotland) Gary Anderson
3. (Scotland) Peter Wright
4. (England) Phil Taylor
5. (England) Adrian Lewis
6. (England) James Wade
7. (England) Dave Chisnall
8. (Austria) Mensur Suljović
9. (Scotland) Robert Thornton
10. (Netherlands) Jelle Klaasen
11. (England) Michael Smith
12. (Netherlands) Raymond van Barneveld
13. (Belgium) Kim Huybrechts
14. (England) Ian White
15. (Netherlands) Benito van de Pas
16. (England) Stephen Bunting
17. (Australia) Simon Whitlock
18. (England) Terry Jenkins
19. (Wales) Gerwyn Price
20. (Netherlands) Vincent van der Voort
21. (England) Alan Norris
22. (England) Mervyn King
23. (Northern Ireland) Brendan Dolan
24. (Northern Ireland) Daryl Gurney
25. (Wales) Mark Webster
26. (England) Justin Pipe
27. (England) Steve Beaton
28. (Australia) ~~Kyle Anderson~~
29. (England) Joe Cullen
30. (England) Jamie Caven
31. (Wales) Jamie Lewis
32. (Scotland) John Henderson
33. (Spain) Cristo Reyes

Pro Tour

1. (England) James Wilson
2. (England) Steve West
3. (England) Chris Dobey
4. (England) Robbie Green
5. (England) Josh Payne
6. (Netherlands) Jermaine Wattimena
7. (Belgium) Ronny Huybrechts
8. (England) Joe Murnan
9. (England) Darren Webster
10. (South Africa) Devon Petersen
11. (Austria) Rowby-John Rodriguez
12. (Netherlands) Christian Kist
13. (Wales) Jonny Clayton
14. (England) Ricky Evans
15. (England) Andrew Gilding
16. (England) Kevin Painter

European Pro Tour

1. (Netherlands) Jeffrey de Graaf
2. (Germany) Max Hopp
3. (Belgium) Dimitri Van den Bergh
4. (Netherlands) Ron Meulenkamp

PDPA Qualifier
First round qualifier

- (England) Mark Frost

Preliminary round qualifiers

- (England) Kevin Simm
- (England) Simon Stevenson
- (England) John Bowles

International qualifiers
First round qualifiers

- (Sweden) Magnus Caris
- (Republic of Ireland) Mick McGowan
- (Greece) John Michael

Preliminary round qualifiers

- (Australia) Corey Cadby
- (Japan) Masumi Chino
- (Netherlands) Jerry Hendriks
- (Germany) Dragutin Horvat
- (Russia) Boris Koltsov
- (Austria) Zoran Lerchbacher
- (New Zealand) Warren Parry
- (Australia) David Platt
- (Malaysia) Tengku Shah
- (Canada) Ross Snook
- (China) Sun Qiang
- (Philippines) Gilbert Ulang
- (Finland) Kim Viljanen

1 Kyle Anderson, who would have been the 28th seed, withdrew from the tournament after being unable to secure a British visa. As a result, Cristo Reyes moved into the top 32 seeds, and 2004 runner-up Kevin Painter qualified through the Pro Tour.

== Preliminary round ==
Best of three sets.

Av.	Player	Score	Player	Av.
86.63	Jerry Hendriks (Netherlands)	2 – 0	(New Zealand) Warren Parry	85.42
83.44	Tengku Shah (Malaysia)	2 – 1	(Japan) Masumi Chino	80.18
76.40	Ross Snook (Canada)	0 – 2	(Finland) Kim Viljanen	83.57
76.05	Kevin Simm (England)	2 – 0	(Philippines) Gilbert Ulang	73.00
88.96	John Bowles (England)	0 – 2	(Australia) David Platt	86.92
68.04	Sun Qiang (China)	0 – 2	(Australia) Corey Cadby	102.48
76.51	Boris Koltsov (Russia)	1 – 2	(Germany) Dragutin Horvat	75.58
90.35	Zoran Lerchbacher (Austria)	2 – 1	(England) Simon Stevenson	85.44

== Main draw ==
=== Finals ===
Quarter-finals (best of 9 sets); 30 December
1	(Netherlands) Michael van Gerwen 103.08	5
24	(Northern Ireland) Daryl Gurney 98.52	1
12	(Netherlands) Raymond van Barneveld 96.31	5
4	(England) Phil Taylor 95.65	3
2	(Scotland) Gary Anderson 105.90	5
7	(England) Dave Chisnall 104.63	3
6	(England) James Wade 99.13	3
3	(Scotland) Peter Wright 104.79	5

Semi-finals (best of 11 sets); 1 January
1	(Netherlands) Michael van Gerwen 114.05	6
12	(Netherlands) Raymond van Barneveld 109.34	2
2	(Scotland) Gary Anderson 103.45	6
3	(Scotland) Peter Wright 99.83	3

Final (best of 13 sets); 2 January
1	(Netherlands) Michael van Gerwen 108.06	7
2	(Scotland) Gary Anderson 104.93	3

=== Rounds 1-4 ===
First round (best of 5 sets); 15–22 December
1	(Netherlands) Michael van Gerwen 103.34	3
(Finland) Kim Viljanen 81.50	0
32	(Spain) Cristo Reyes 95.54	3
(Belgium) Dimitri Van den Bergh 99.11	2
16	(England) Stephen Bunting 91.02	2
(England) Darren Webster 94.46	3
17	(Australia) Simon Whitlock 98.70	3
(Germany) Dragutin Horvat 88.18	0
8	(Austria) Mensur Suljović 88.51	3
(Netherlands) Ron Meulenkamp 88.56	0
25	(Wales) Mark Webster 87.78	3
(England) Joe Murnan 88.84	0
9	(Scotland) Robert Thornton 88.55	3
(Austria) Zoran Lerchbacher 81.80	0
24	(Northern Ireland) Daryl Gurney 96.85	3
(Netherlands) Jermaine Wattimena 91.90	1
5	(England) Adrian Lewis 93.25	3
(Sweden) Magnus Caris 80.64	0
28	(England) Joe Cullen 100.88	3
(Australia) Corey Cadby 98.62	1
12	(Netherlands) Raymond van Barneveld 98.84	3
(England) Robbie Green 90.08	0
21	(England) Alan Norris 91.61	3
(Greece) John Michael 86.05	2
4	(England) Phil Taylor 101.68	3
(Australia) David Platt 86.94	0
29	(England) Jamie Caven 81.51	1
(England) Kevin Painter 85.13	3
13	(Belgium) Kim Huybrechts 98.66	3
(England) James Wilson 94.69	0
20	(Netherlands) Vincent van der Voort 88.79	1
(Germany) Max Hopp 94.59	3
2	(Scotland) Gary Anderson 96.16	3
(England) Mark Frost 73.74	0
31	(Scotland) John Henderson 88.19	2
(England) Andrew Gilding 90.94	3
15	(Netherlands) Benito van de Pas 91.18	3
(Malaysia) Tengku Shah 87.86	1
18	(England) Terry Jenkins 93.66	3
(England) Josh Payne 88.94	1
7	(England) Dave Chisnall 98.72	3
(Austria) Rowby-John Rodriguez 94.90	2
26	(England) Justin Pipe 85.94	1
(England) Chris Dobey 90.70	3
10	(Netherlands) Jelle Klaasen 96.02	3
(Netherlands) Jeffrey de Graaf 89.79	1
23	(Northern Ireland) Brendan Dolan 95.12	3
(Netherlands) Christian Kist 88.67	1
6	(England) James Wade 93.83	3
(Belgium) Ronny Huybrechts 87.72	0
27	(England) Steve Beaton 88.55	3
(South Africa) Devon Petersen 79.29	1
11	(England) Michael Smith 96.78	3
(England) Ricky Evans 93.20	2
22	(England) Mervyn King 86.85	3
(England) Steve West 86.66	2
3	(Scotland) Peter Wright 101.06	3
(Netherlands) Jerry Hendriks 86.55	0
30	(Wales) Jamie Lewis 91.08	3
(Republic of Ireland) Mick McGowan 87.01	2
14	(England) Ian White 87.20	3
(England) Kevin Simm 82.16	0
19	(Wales) Gerwyn Price 86.89	1
(Wales) Jonny Clayton 89.88	3

Second round (best of 7 sets); 23–28 December
1	(Netherlands) van Gerwen 105.24	4
32	(Spain) Reyes 106.07	2
(England) D. Webster 104.64	4
17	(Australia) Whitlock 99.50	0
8	(Austria) Suljović 91.23	3
25	(Wales) M. Webster 92.79	4
9	(Scotland) Thornton 90.74	3
24	(Northern Ireland) Gurney 95.35	4
5	(England) A. Lewis 102.65	4
28	(England) Cullen 82.74	0
12	(Netherlands) van Barneveld 103.59	4
21	(England) Norris 97.03	0
4	(England) Taylor 92.73	4
(England) Painter 90.52	0
13	(Belgium) K. Huybrechts 92.76	4
(Germany) Hopp 87.57	0
2	(Scotland) Anderson 102.58	4
(England) Gilding 86.21	0
15	(Netherlands) van de Pas 95.79	4
18	(England) Jenkins 94.70	3
7	(England) Chisnall 92.88	4
(England) Dobey 90.71	2
10	(Netherlands) Klaasen 93.32	4
23	(Northern Ireland) Dolan 93.34	0
6	(England) Wade 99.39	4
27	(England) Beaton 97.74	1
11	(England) Smith 93.83	4
22	(England) King 94.24	3
3	(Scotland) Wright 103.53	4
30	(Wales) J. Lewis 91.35	0
14	(England) White 92.60	4
(Wales) Clayton 86.38	1

Third round (best of 7 sets); 28–29 December
1	(Netherlands) van Gerwen 104.44	4
(England) D. Webster 99.20	1
25	(Wales) M. Webster 89.10	3
24	(Northern Ireland) Gurney 92.33	4
5	(England) A. Lewis 98.05	3
12	(Netherlands) van Barneveld 95.00	4
4	(England) Taylor 101.37	4
13	(Belgium) K. Huybrechts 93.86	2
2	(Scotland) Anderson 107.68	4
15	(Netherlands) van de Pas 102.30	2
7	(England) Chisnall 93.88	4
10	(Netherlands) Klaasen 88.36	2
6	(England) Wade 94.01	4
11	(England) Smith 94.52	3
3	(Scotland) Wright 103.05	4
14	(England) White 96.17	1

Quarter-finals (best of 9 sets); 30 December
1	(Netherlands) van Gerwen 103.08	5
24	(Northern Ireland) Gurney 98.52	1
12	(Netherlands) van Barneveld 96.31	5
4	(England) Taylor 95.65	3
2	(Scotland) Anderson 105.90	5
7	(England) Chisnall 104.63	3
6	(England) Wade 99.13	3
3	(Scotland) Wright 104.79	5

== Final ==
Final: Best of 13 sets. Referees: George Noble (first half) and Paul Hinks (second half). Alexandra Palace, London, England, 2 January 2017.
(1) Michael van Gerwen (Netherlands)	7 – 3	(Scotland) Gary Anderson (2)
3 – 2, 2 – 3, 2 – 3, 3 – 2, 3 – 0, 3 – 1, 3 – 0, 3 – 1, 2 – 3, 3 – 2
108.06	Average (3 darts)	104.93
20	180 scores	22
125	Highest checkout	81
44.26% (27/61)	Checkout summary	37.78% (17/45)

== Statistics ==
Player	Eliminated	Played	Sets Won	Sets Lost	Legs Won	Legs Lost	Leg Breaks	100+	140+	170+	180s	High checkout	Checkout Av.%	Average
(Netherlands) Michael van Gerwen	Winner	6	29	9	100	58	33	196	101	18	66	170	42.74	106.37
(Scotland) Gary Anderson	Runner-up	6	25	15	93	76	34	203	143	6	71	157	40.97	103.45
(Netherlands) Raymond van Barneveld	Semi-finals	5	18	12	67	52	23	144	84	14	33	167	42.95	100.62
(Scotland) Peter Wright	Semi-finals	5	19	10	68	46	25	179	107	2	26	144	46.26	102.45
(Northern Ireland) Daryl Gurney	Quarter-finals	4	12	12	51	45	18	125	63	3	23	161	34.23	95.76
(England) Phil Taylor	Quarter-finals	4	14	7	52	35	22	124	57	2	19	167	39.39	97.92
(England) Dave Chisnall	Quarter-finals	4	14	11	59	47	21	119	62	3	48	130	39.86	97.53
(England) James Wade	Quarter-finals	4	14	9	51	43	18	148	76	0	24	155	49.04	96.59
(England) Darren Webster	Third round	3	8	6	35	31	13	83	54	1	24	157	41.18	99.43
(Wales) Mark Webster	Third round	3	10	7	39	32	15	81	48	1	13	129	31.71	89.89
(England) Adrian Lewis	Third round	3	10	4	34	23	12	74	39	3	16	161	44.74	97.98
(Belgium) Kim Huybrechts	Third round	3	9	4	32	23	13	67	33	2	17	138	47.06	95.09
(Netherlands) Benito van de Pas	Third round	3	9	8	38	36	16	84	30	4	18	143	45.78	96.42
(Netherlands) Jelle Klaasen	Third round	3	9	5	32	31	8	57	34	2	19	140	50.79	92.57
(England) Michael Smith	Third round	3	10	9	42	38	18	95	46	3	27	143	32.31	95.04
(England) Ian White	Third round	3	8	5	28	26	11	67	28	0	16	130	50.91	91.99
(Spain) Cristo Reyes	Second round	2	5	6	23	24	5	53	31	2	9	130	60.53	100.81
(Australia) Simon Whitlock	Second round	2	3	4	15	13	3	30	15	1	9	170	38.46	99.10
(Austria) Mensur Suljović	Second round	2	6	4	21	21	9	69	21	2	10	120	27.63	89.87
(Scotland) Robert Thornton	Second round	2	6	4	19	21	9	41	31	0	9	124	27.54	89.65
(England) Joe Cullen	Second round	2	3	5	14	20	5	31	19	1	8	117	37.84	91.81
(England) Alan Norris	Second round	2	3	6	13	23	5	35	28	3	6	64	26.53	94.32
(England) Kevin Painter	Second round	2	3	5	14	18	4	39	16	0	7	124	31.11	87.83
(Germany) Max Hopp	Second round	2	3	5	15	17	5	52	23	0	7	102	41.67	91.08
(England) Andrew Gilding	Second round	2	3	6	19	25	4	47	25	2	9	143	44.19	88.58
(England) Terry Jenkins	Second round	2	6	5	27	21	11	68	38	1	11	140	39.13	94.18
(England) Chris Dobey	Second round	2	5	5	21	21	11	53	24	0	8	112	42.86	90.71
(Northern Ireland) Brendan Dolan	Second round	2	3	5	16	16	6	52	15	1	6	142	51.61	94.23
(England) Steve Beaton	Second round	2	4	5	16	19	5	47	19	1	8	124	35.56	93.15
(England) Mervyn King	Second round	2	6	6	30	31	12	86	31	3	8	148	36.14	90.55
(Wales) Jamie Lewis	Second round	2	3	6	13	19	4	33	17	0	9	110	43.33	91.22
(Wales) Jonny Clayton	Second round	2	4	5	19	20	7	56	25	1	5	120	30.65	88.13
(Finland) Kim Viljanen	First round	2	2	3	7	11	3	16	12	0	3	120	41.18	82.54
(Belgium) Dimitri Van den Bergh	First round	1	2	3	10	12	1	15	17	1	9	98	40.00	99.11
(England) Stephen Bunting	First round	1	2	3	11	15	5	31	17	1	6	118	37.93	91.02
(Germany) Dragutin Horvat	First round	2	2	4	8	15	2	35	11	0	3	101	20.51	81.88
(Netherlands) Ron Meulenkamp	First round	1	0	3	4	9	2	16	5	0	3	116	33.33	88.56
(England) Joe Murnan	First round	1	0	3	4	9	1	14	5	0	3	70	36.36	88.84
(Austria) Zoran Lerchbacher	First round	2	2	4	12	14	6	34	22	1	3	75	27.91	86.08
(Netherlands) Jermaine Wattimena	First round	1	1	3	5	10	1	24	7	0	2	90	29.41	91.90
(Sweden) Magnus Caris	First round	1	0	3	4	9	0	15	5	0	1	60	28.57	80.64
(Australia) Corey Cadby	First round	2	3	3	14	10	7	32	16	0	6	152	60.87	100.55
(England) Robbie Green	First round	1	0	3	2	9	0	14	4	0	1	86	28.57	90.08
(Greece) John Michael	First round	1	2	3	11	11	4	29	10	0	4	141	57.89	86.05
(Australia) David Platt	First round	2	2	3	8	13	1	31	5	2	2	156	38.10	86.93
(England) Jamie Caven	First round	1	1	3	6	10	2	17	9	0	0	60	27.27	81.51
(England) James Wilson	First round	1	0	3	3	9	0	15	12	0	1	40	25.00	94.69
(Netherlands) Vincent van der Voort	First round	1	1	3	5	10	2	19	8	1	2	90	20.00	88.79
(England) Mark Frost	First round	1	0	3	2	9	0	10	6	0	0	73	25.00	73.74
(Scotland) John Henderson	First round	1	2	3	13	15	3	27	25	0	3	121	50.00	88.19
(Malaysia) Tengku Shah	First round	2	3	4	13	16	8	36	15	0	6	101	29.55	85.65
(England) Josh Payne	First round	1	1	3	6	11	2	18	9	0	7	75	37.50	88.94
(Austria) Rowby-John Rodriguez	First round	1	2	3	8	12	4	17	12	0	7	85	34.78	94.90
(England) Justin Pipe	First round	1	1	3	7	11	4	14	10	0	7	78	20.59	85.94
(Netherlands) Jeffrey de Graaf	First round	1	1	3	8	9	3	27	5	0	2	127	38.10	89.79
(Netherlands) Christian Kist	First round	1	1	3	4	9	2	20	5	1	1	105	33.33	88.67
(Belgium) Ronny Huybrechts	First round	1	0	3	4	9	2	18	6	0	1	69	50.00	87.72
(South Africa) Devon Petersen	First round	1	1	3	5	9	2	15	8	0	2	100	33.33	79.29
(England) Ricky Evans	First round	1	2	3	8	12	3	24	15	0	3	120	34.78	93.20
(England) Steve West	First round	1	2	3	13	14	5	32	8	0	8	109	37.14	86.66
(Netherlands) Jerry Hendriks	First round	2	2	3	8	13	2	23	12	1	4	156	40.00	86.59
(Republic of Ireland) Mick McGowan	First round	1	2	3	7	12	2	23	8	1	3	95	36.84	87.01
(England) Kevin Simm	First round	2	2	3	11	13	4	36	9	0	5	100	26.19	79.11
(Wales) Gerwyn Price	First round	1	1	3	7	11	3	23	12	0	4	53	26.92	86.89
(New Zealand) Warren Parry	Prelim. Round	1	0	2	4	6	1	15	8	0	1	102	33.33	85.42
(Japan) Masumi Chino	Prelim. Round	1	1	2	5	7	3	22	7	0	0	117	26.32	80.18
(Canada) Ross Snook	Prelim. Round	1	0	2	2	6	1	8	3	0	2	38	25.00	76.40
(Philippines) Gilbert Ulang	Prelim. Round	1	0	2	4	6	1	8	3	0	2	56	28.57	73.00
(England) John Bowles	Prelim. Round	1	0	2	4	6	0	13	8	1	0	110	28.57	88.96
(China) Sun Qiang	Prelim. Round	1	0	2	0	6	0	8	1	0	0	0	0/0	68.04
(Russia) Boris Koltsov	Prelim. Round	1	1	2	6	7	2	16	3	1	0	97	40.00	76.51
(England) Simon Stevenson	Prelim. Round	1	1	2	5	8	3	13	11	0	2	76	29.41	85.44

== Top averages ==
This table shows the highest averages achieved by players throughout the tournament.

#	Player	Round	Score
1	Michael van Gerwen	SF	114.05 *
2	Raymond van Barneveld	SF	109.34 **
3	Michael van Gerwen	F	108.06
4	Gary Anderson	3	107.68
5	Cristo Reyes	2	106.07
6	Gary Anderson	QF	105.90
7	Michael van Gerwen	2	105.24
8	Gary Anderson	F	104.93 ***
9	Peter Wright	QF	104.79
10	Darren Webster	2	104.64

* The highest average in the history of the PDC World Championship.

** The highest losing average in the history of the PDC World Championship.

*** The highest losing average in the final of a PDC World Championship.

== Best ever World Championship tournament average by Michael van Gerwen ==
Round	Opponent	Sets	Legs	Points	Darts used	3 Dart Average
1st round	Kim Viljanen	3 – 0	9 – 1	4995 – 3776	145 – 139	103.34 – 81.50
2nd round	Cristo Reyes	4 – 2	14 – 11	11682 – 11385	333 – 322	105.24 – 106.07
3rd round	Darren Webster	4 – 1	14 – 8	10548 – 9788	303 – 296	104.44 – 99.20
Quarter-final	Daryl Gurney	5 – 1	17 – 8	12060 – 11166	351 – 340	103.08 – 98.52
Semi final	Raymond van Barneveld	6 – 2	19 – 13	15017 – 14396	395 – 395	114.05 – 109.34
Final	Gary Anderson	7 – 3	27 – 17	20963 – 19867	582 – 568	108.06 – 104.95
Total	Player	29 – 9	100 – 58	75265 – 70378	2109 – 2060	107.06 – 102.49

Michael van Gerwen scored a total of 75265 points scored with 2109 darts used. This gives a tournament three dart average (3DA) of 107.06, which is the highest tournament average in the history of the PDC World Championship. Note: the tournament match average reported elsewhere is 106.37 (sum of the match averages divided by number of matches), also a record.

== Representation from different countries ==
This table shows the number of players by country in the World Championship, the total number including the preliminary round. Twenty-two countries were represented in the World Championship, one less than in the previous championship.

	(England) ENG	(Netherlands) NED	(Scotland) SCO	(Wales) WAL	(Belgium) BEL	(Australia) AUS	(Austria) AUT	(Northern Ireland) NIR	(Germany) GER	(Spain) SPA	(South Africa) RSA	(Republic of Ireland) IRL	(Sweden) SWE	(Greece) GRE	(Finland) FIN	(Malaysia) MAL	(Canada) CAN	(China) CHN	(Japan) JPN	(New Zealand) NZL	(Philippines) PHI	(Russia) RUS	Total
Final	–	1	1	–	–	–	–	–	–	–	–	–	–	–	–	–	–	–	–	–	–	–	2
Semis	–	2	2	–	–	–	–	–	–	–	–	–	–	–	–	–	–	–	–	–	–	–	4
Quarters	3	2	2	–	–	–	–	1	–	–	–	–	–	–	–	–	–	–	–	–	–	–	8
Round 3	7	4	2	1	1	–	–	1	–	–	–	–	–	–	–	–	–	–	–	–	–	–	16
Round 2	15	4	3	3	1	1	1	2	1	1	–	–	–	–	–	–	–	–	–	–	–	–	32
Round 1	26	10	4	4	3	3	3	2	2	1	1	1	1	1	1	1	–	–	–	–	–	–	64
Prelim.	3	1	–	–	–	2	1	–	1	–	–	–	–	–	1	1	1	1	1	1	1	1	16
Total	28	10	4	4	3	3	3	2	2	1	1	1	1	1	1	1	1	1	1	1	1	1	72

== Media coverage ==
The tournament was available in the following countries on these channels:

Country	Channel
United Kingdom (Republic of Ireland) Ireland	Sky Sports Darts †
Netherlands	RTL 7 RTL 7 Darts Radio
Germany	Sport 1 and DAZN
Denmark	TV3 Sport1/TV3 Sport2
Norway	Viasport 3
Baltic States	Viasat Sport
Australia Greece; Turkey; Cyprus; Malta; Israel; Italy	Fox Sports
New Zealand	Sky Sport (New Zealand)
Czech Republic; Slovakia; Bulgaria	Nova Sport
Hungary	Sport1 or Sport2
United States; Brazil	ESPN 3/WatchESPN
Belgium	Eleven Sport Network
MENA	OSN Sports
Sub-Saharan Africa	Kwesé Sports 1 or 2
China	CCTV5+

† Sky Sports F1 was renamed as Sky Sports Darts for the duration of the tournament.
