= Kevin Simm (darts player) =

English darts player (born 1968)

Personal information
- Nickname: Fatboy Simm
- Born: 3 December 1968 (age 57) Newcastle upon Tyne, England
- Home town: Tyldesley, Greater Manchester, England

Sport
- Sport: Darts
- Playing since: 1992
- Darts: 24 Gram
- Laterality: Left-handed
- Walk-on music: "Rock and Roll" by Led Zeppelin

Organisation (see split in darts)
- BDO: 2004–2015
- PDC: 2016–

WDF major events – best performances
- World Masters: Last 40: 2008

PDC premier events – best performances
- World Championship: Last 64: 2017
- UK Open: Last 128: 2012

Other tournament wins
- Tournament: Years
- FCD Anniversary Open: 2015

Kevin Simm (born 3 December 1968) is an English professional darts player who competes in Professional Darts Corporation events.

== Career ==
Simm reached the last 40 of the 2008 Winmau World Masters, losing to Robbie Green.

Simm qualified for the 2017 PDC World Darts Championship after reaching the Final of the PDPA Qualifier in Wigan. He went on to beat Gilbert Ulang 2-0 in the preliminary round before losing 0-3 to Ian White in the first round.

== World Championship results ==
=== PDC ===
- 2017: First round (lost to Ian White 0–3)
