= Casey Gallagher =

English darts player (born 1996)

Personal information
- Born: 2 August 1996 (age 30) London, England
- Home town: Crayford, England

Sport
- Sport: Darts
- Laterality: Right-handed
- Walk-on music: "Wannabe" by Spice Girls

Organisation (see split in darts)
- BDO: 2012–2020
- WDF: 2012–
- Current world ranking: (WDF W) NR (17 August 2026)

WDF major events – best performances
- World Championship: Quarter Final: 2017
- World Masters: Runner Up: 2018
- World Trophy: Quarter Final: 2019

Other tournament wins
- Years
| Malta Open | 2012 |
| WDF Europe Cup | 2012, 2013 |
| WDF World Cup | 2013 |
| Swedish Open | 2015 |
| LDO Swedish Classic | 2015 |
| Antwerp Open | 2018 |
| North Cyprus Classic | 2022 |

Casey Gallagher (born 2 August 1996) is an English female darts player who plays in World Darts Federation (WDF) events.

== Career ==
Gallagher has made a name in the BDO tour, winning various titles in the girls' section, and already winning a ladies' tournament, after triumphing in the Malta Open in 2012. She has also won the WDF Europe Cup Girls' Singles twice: in 2012, and defended her title in 2013. She also completed the triple with the England girls' team, taking the overall title on both occasions; and she also won the pairs in 2012 with Josie Patterson, and in 2013 with Natasha Eaves. In october 2013 came her biggest two wins in youth events when she won the WDF World Cup Girls Singles defeating Tiarna Smith in the final, she then won the Winmau World Masters Girls title by beating Kayleigh O'Neill 4-0 in the final. She played Deta Hedman at the 2014 BDO World Trophy, losing 0–4 in legs. She qualified for her first world championships the following year losing to Rachel Brooks in the first round.

In 2015, Casey achieved her first double ranking title win in one weekend, by winning the LDO Swedish Classic and Swedish Open in August, wins over Fallon Sherrock and Anastasia Dobromyslova respectively in the finals capped her 2nd and 3rd senior ranking titles. Casey also achieved 2 Semi finals in November in the Jersey Open and Jersey Classic, with 3 further quarter finals coming in successive weekends in the England National Championships, Antwerp Open and Belgium Open which ensured her of a place at Lakeside for the 2016 BDO World Championships.

In 2016, steady runs would again ensure Casey would reach a third straight World Championships going into the tournament ranked 13th in the World. She faced Deta Hedman, the world number 1, in the first round of the 2017 BDO World Darts Championship, winning 2-1. She went out to Corrine Hammond in the Quarter Finals.

In 2017, she failed to qualify for the World Trophy and went out in the floor games in the Winmau World Masters. A late flurry of good runs including reaching the final of the Antwerp Open, and semi finals of the Antwerp Masters. However she failed to qualify for the 2018 BDO World Darts Championship.

In 2018, Casey managed automatic qualification to the 2019 BDO World Darts Championship after finishing 10th in the rankings for the season, which included various quarter finals, including the EDO London Ladies Open, Jersey Classic, Belfry Open, Swiss Open & England Open, along with a further semi final at the Malta Open after defeating Lisa Ashton in the quarter finals. Casey reached two ranking finals in the season, at the Welsh Masters where she lost out to Fallon Sherrock in the final and then at the Antwerp Open where she defeated Tricia Wright to win the title and her 5th Ranking Title. At the 2018 BDO World Masters she came through the floor stages defeating Poland's Karolina Podgorska in the first round who had won through the Ladies 2018 BDO World Darts Championship Ladies Qualifiers the day before. She also defeated former champion Linda Ithurralde on route to qualify for the Quarter Finals. She faced the Current World Number 1 Lorraine Winstanley who she defeated 4-0 to progress to the Semi Finals. She faced Anastasia Dobromyslova which she won 4-3 and faces Lisa Ashton in her first Major Darts Final.

In 2019, Casey received her first senior international call up for the 2019 British Internationals in the England Ladies Squad, winning both matches with her debut win against Welsh Captain Rhian O'Sullivan with a 3-0 scoreline followed by a 3-1 win over Scotland's Lynsey McDonald. On the BDO tour, Casey had a fairly quiet season with best results being Quarter Final runs in the Slovak Masters, Isle of Man Classic, England Open and Helvetia Opens, this was enough to qualify for the BDO World Championships where she suffered a first round defeat to Lorraine Winstanley.

In 2020, Casey achieved the 4th Highest Average ever hit by a lady in the British Inter County Championships with a 32.67 hit in a win playing for London, only Trina Gulliver has achieved higher since its inception in the 1970's. Before COVID-19 brought a hault to Tour Darts Casey sits 14th in the World Rankings, and started the season in decent form with Quarter Final runs in the Isle of Man Masters, Isle of Man Classic and Scottish Open. Casey also won the Isle of Man Ladies Pairs title for the 3rd year in a row alongside partner Fallon Sherrock.

== World Championship results ==
=== BDO ===
- 2015: First round (lost to Rachel Brooks 0–2) (sets)
- 2016: First round (lost to Aileen de Graaf 0–2)
- 2017: Quarter-finals (lost to Corrine Hammond 0–2)
- 2019: First round (lost to Lorraine Winstanley 1–2)
- 2020: First round (lost to Lorraine Winstanley 0–2)
