= Sun Qiang =

Chinese darts player

Personal information
- Nickname: "The Crane"
- Born: 9 March 1970 (age 56) Shenzhen, Guangdong, China
- Home town: Shenzhen, Guangdong, China

Sport
- Sport: Darts
- Playing since: 1992
- Darts: 18 gram
- Laterality: Right-handed
- Walk-on music: "Spirit in the Sky" by Norman Greenbaum

Organisation (see split in darts)
- BDO: 2010
- PDC: 2013–2017

PDC premier events – best performances
- World Championship: Preliminary round: 2016, 2017

Other tournament wins
- Tournament: Years
- PDC World China Qualifying Event: 2015, 2016

Sun Qiang (born 9 March 1970) is a Chinese former professional darts player who played in Professional Darts Corporation (PDC) events.

== Career ==
Sun qualified for the 2016 PDC World Darts Championship after winning the Greater China Qualifier. He played Mick McGowan in the preliminary round, but won only one leg and was beaten by two sets to nil. Sun returned a year later after again winning the Chinese Qualifier. He met Australian Corey Cadby in the preliminary round and lost 2–0, with Cadby producing a record prelim average of 102.48, over 30 points higher than Sun's.

== World Championship results ==
=== PDC ===
- 2016: Preliminary round: (lost to Mick McGowan 0–2)
- 2017: Preliminary round: (lost to Corey Cadby 0–2)
