= 2019 BDO World Darts Championship =

Tournament information
- Dates: 5–13 January 2019
- Venue: Lakeside Country Club
- Location: Frimley Green, Surrey
- Country: England
- Organisation(s): British Darts Organisation (BDO)
- Format: Sets
- Prize fund: £329,000
- High checkout: 160; Willem Mandigers; Krzysztof Kciuk; (men); 156 Sharon Prins (women)

Champion(s)
- Glen Durrant (ENG) (Men); Mikuru Suzuki (JPN) (Women); Leighton Bennett (ENG) (Youth)

The 2019 BDO World Professional Darts Championship (known for sponsorship reasons as the 2019 Lakeside World Professional Darts Championship) was the 42nd World Championship organised by the British Darts Organisation, and the 34th and final staging at the Lakeside Country Club at Frimley Green.

Glen Durrant was the two-time defending men's champion after beating Mark McGeeney, 7–6 in the previous year's final.

Durrant successfully defended his title to become the first three times consecutive BDO Men's World Champion since Eric Bristow in 1986, and the first male player in history to win his first three world championship finals.

Lisa Ashton was the two-time defending women's champion, after winning her fourth world title, with a 3–1 win over Anastasia Dobromyslova in 2018, but was defeated in the first round by Mikuru Suzuki.

Suzuki went on to become the fifth BDO Women's World Champion, after defeating Lorraine Winstanley 3–0 in the final. In doing so, she hit the highest ever average in a Women's World Championship Final.

Three-time champion Martin Adams missed out on the event for the first time since his debut appearance in 1994.

== Prize money ==
Men's

Position (num. of players)		Prize money
Winner	(1)	£100,000
Runner-up	(1)	£35,000
Semi-finalist	(2)	£15,000
Quarter-finalist	(4)	£6,500
Second round losers	(8)	£4,500
First round losers	(16)	£3,250
Preliminary round losers	(8)	£2,000
Highest checkout		£5,000
Total	£300,000	

Women's

Position (num. of players)		Prize money
Winner	(1)	£12,000
Runner-up	(1)	£5,000
Semi-finalist	(2)	£2,000
Quarter-finalist	(4)	£1,000
First round losers	(8)	£500
Total	£29,000	

== Men's ==
=== Format and qualifiers ===
1–16 in BDO rankings
Seeded in first round

1. (England) Mark McGeeney (second round)
2. (England) Glen Durrant (champion)
3. (Wales) Jim Williams (semi-finals)
4. (Netherlands) Wesley Harms (second round)
5. (Germany) Michael Unterbuchner (semi-finals)
6. (England) Scott Mitchell (quarter-finals)
7. (England) Gary Robson (first round)
8. (Netherlands) Richard Veenstra (second round)
9. (England) Scott Waites (runner-up)
10. (Netherlands) Chris Landman (first round)
11. (England) Dave Parletti (first round)
12. (Wales) Wayne Warren (second round)
13. (Netherlands) Willem Mandigers (quarter-finals)
14. (England) Daniel Day (first round)
15. (Scotland) Ross Montgomery (first round)
16. (Wales) Martin Phillips (first round)

17–24 in BDO rankings
First round

17. (Northern Ireland) Kyle McKinstry (quarter-finals)
18. (England) Scott Baker (second round)
19. (Netherlands) Derk Telnekes (first round)
20. (England) Tony O'Shea (first round)
21. (England) Conan Whitehead (quarter-finals)
22. (Wales) Dean Reynolds (second round)
23. (Belgium) Jeffrey Van Egdom (first round)
24. (Wales) Mark Layton (first round)

25–27 in BDO rankings
Preliminary round

25. (Netherlands) Wouter Vaes (preliminary round)
26. (Australia) Justin Thompson (first round)
27. (England) Wes Newton (preliminary round)

Winmau World Master
Preliminary round

28. (England) Adam Smith-Neale (preliminary round)

Regional Table qualifiers
Preliminary round

- (Denmark) Brian Løkken (preliminary round)
- (England) Paul Hogan (first round)
- (Canada) David Cameron (second round)
- (Serbia) Oliver Ferenc (first round)
- (New Zealand) Mark McGrath (first round)
- (United States) Jim Widmayer (preliminary round)
- (Belgium) Roger Janssen (first round)
- (Australia) Mal Cuming (preliminary round)

Playoff qualifiers
Preliminary round

- (Poland) Krzysztof Kciuk (second round)
- (England) Nigel Heydon (first round)
- (Scotland) Ryan Hogarth (preliminary round)
- (England) Andy Hamilton (preliminary round)

== Draw bracket ==
The draw was conducted on 22 November 2018.

=== Preliminary round ===
All matches are the first to 3 sets.

Av.	Player	Score	Player	Av.
86.27	(Q) Jim Widmayer (United States)	2–3	(England) Nigel Heydon (Q)	88.60
88.09	(Q) Paul Hogan (England)	3–1	(England) Wes Newton	78.28
81.60	(Q) Mal Cuming (Australia)	0–3	(Australia) Justin Thompson	91.17
77.17	(Q) Brian Løkken (Denmark)	1–3	(Poland) Krzysztof Kciuk (Q)	79.37
82.43	(Q) Roger Janssen (Belgium)	3–0	(Netherlands) Wouter Vaes	78.68
81.00	(Q) Mark McGrath (New Zealand)	3–0	(England) Adam Smith-Neale (WC)	66.54
86.13	(Q) David Cameron (Canada)	3–0	(England) Andy Hamilton (Q)	83.53
82.47	(Q) Oliver Ferenc (Serbia)	3–1	(Scotland) Ryan Hogarth (Q)	81.17

=== Last 32 ===
First round (best of 5 sets); 5–8 January
1	(England) Mark McGeeney 87.73	3
(Netherlands) Derk Telnekes 85.14	1
16	(Wales) Martin Phillips 82.23	2
(England) Conan Whitehead 83.34	3
8	(Netherlands) Richard Veenstra 89.68	3
Q	(England) Nigel Heydon 93.08	2
9	(England) Scott Waites 86.55	3
(Belgium) Jeffrey Van Egdom 82.08	1
5	(Germany) Michael Unterbuchner 90.13	3
(Australia) Justin Thompson 86.72	2
12	(Wales) Wayne Warren 97.71	3
(Wales) Mark Layton 86.91	0
4	(Netherlands) Wesley Harms 87.89	3
(England) Tony O'Shea 84.90	2
13	(Netherlands) Willem Mandigers 82.69	3
Q	(England) Paul Hogan 88.31	0
2	(England) Glen Durrant 93.90	3
Q	(New Zealand) Mark McGrath 82.89	0
15	(Scotland) Ross Montgomery 79.30	0
(England) Scott Baker 83.17	3
7	(England) Gary Robson 74.34	1
Q	(Canada) David Cameron 89.65	3
10	(Netherlands) Chris Landman 89.01	2
(Northern Ireland) Kyle McKinstry 91.16	3
6	(England) Scott Mitchell 94.64	3
Q	(Serbia) Oliver Ferenc 85.60	0
11	(England) Dave Parletti 83.82	1
Q	(Poland) Krzysztof Kciuk 85.93	3
3	(Wales) Jim Williams 92.26	3
Q	(Belgium) Roger Janssen 85.97	2
14	(England) Daniel Day 80.29	1
(Wales) Dean Reynolds 76.59	3

Second round (best of 7 sets); 9–10 January
1	(England) Mark McGeeney 86.72	0
(England) Conan Whitehead 96.25	4
8	(Netherlands) Richard Veenstra 88.36	1
9	(England) Scott Waites 92.82	4
5	(Germany) Michael Unterbuchner 91.54	4
12	(Wales) Wayne Warren 91.40	0
4	(Netherlands) Wesley Harms 92.60	2
13	(Netherlands) Willem Mandigers 93.00	4
2	(England) Glen Durrant 95.92	4
(England) Scott Baker 88.16	3
Q	(Canada) David Cameron 83.77	3
(Northern Ireland) Kyle McKinstry 88.94	4
6	(England) Scott Mitchell 86.00	4
Q	(Poland) Krzysztof Kciuk 81.78	0
3	(Wales) Jim Williams 91.82	4
(Wales) Dean Reynolds 73.29	0

Quarter-finals (best of 9 sets); 11 January
(England) Conan Whitehead 92.93	3
9	(England) Scott Waites 95.13	5
5	(Germany) Michael Unterbuchner 88.09	5
13	(Netherlands) Willem Mandigers 86.42	4
2	(England) Glen Durrant 98.02	5
(Northern Ireland) Kyle McKinstry 90.96	2
6	(England) Scott Mitchell 92.08	3
3	(Wales) Jim Williams 93.27	5

Semi-finals (best of 11 sets); 12 January
9	(England) Scott Waites 85.30	6
5	(Germany) Michael Unterbuchner 83.23	1
2	(England) Glen Durrant 96.05	6
3	(Wales) Jim Williams 94.47	3

Final (best of 13 sets); 13 January
9	(England) Scott Waites 91.38	3
2	(England) Glen Durrant 95.19	7

== Women's ==
=== Format and qualifiers ===
1–8 in BDO rankings
Seeded

1. (England) Lorraine Winstanley (runner-up)
2. (England) Lisa Ashton (first round)
3. (England) Deta Hedman (first round)
4. (Russia) Anastasia Dobromyslova (semi-finals)
5. (Netherlands) Aileen de Graaf (quarter-finals)
6. (England) Fallon Sherrock (quarter-finals)
7. (Netherlands) Sharon Prins (quarter-finals)
8. (England) Trina Gulliver (quarter-finals)

9–14 in BDO rankings
First round

9. (Australia) Corrine Hammond (first round)
10. (England) Maria O'Brien (semi-finals)
11. (England) Casey Gallagher (first round)
12. (England) Roz Bulmer (first round)
13. (England) Paula Jacklin (first round)
14. (England) Laura Turner (first round)

Playoff qualifiers
First round

- (Poland) Karolina Podgórska (first round)
- (Japan) Mikuru Suzuki (winner)

=== Draw ===
The draw was conducted on 22 November 2018.

First round (best of 3 sets); 5–9 January
1	(England) Lorraine Winstanley 69.25	3	2	3
(England) Casey Gallagher 71.46	2	3	0
8	(England) Trina Gulliver 72.51	1	3	3
Q	(Poland) Karolina Podgórska 70.02	3	1	2
4	(Russia) Anastasia Dobromyslova 81.98	3	3
(England) Laura Turner 59.11	0	0
5	(Netherlands) Aileen de Graaf 72.11	3	3
(England) Paula Jacklin 65.35	1	1
2	(England) Lisa Ashton 75.81	2	2
Q	(Japan) Mikuru Suzuki 79.83	3	3
7	(Netherlands) Sharon Prins 63.76	3	3
(England) Roz Bulmer 65.45	2	1
3	(England) Deta Hedman 67.52	2	2
(England) Maria O'Brien 70.81	3	3
6	(England) Fallon Sherrock 89.67	3	3
(Australia) Corrine Hammond 80.94	0	1

Quarter-finals (best of 3 sets); 10 January
1	(England) Lorraine Winstanley 73.04	3	3
8	(England) Trina Gulliver 72.34	1	2
4	(Russia) Anastasia Dobromyslova 82.58	3	3
5	(Netherlands) Aileen de Graaf 75.31	2	0
Q	(Japan) Mikuru Suzuki 61.70	3	3
7	(Netherlands) Sharon Prins 59.10	1	1
(England) Maria O'Brien 86.69	3	3
6	(England) Fallon Sherrock 78.84	2	2

Semi-finals (best of 3 sets); 11 January
1	(England) Lorraine Winstanley 75.19	2	3	3
4	(Russia) Anastasia Dobromyslova 78.21	3	1	0
Q	(Japan) Mikuru Suzuki 76.12	3	3
(England) Maria O'Brien 69.07	2	1

Final (best of 5 sets); 12 January
1	(England) Lorraine Winstanley 78.82	0	1	1
Q	(Japan) Mikuru Suzuki 90.12	3	3	3

== Youth ==
Av.	Player	Score	Player	Av.
86.65	Leighton Bennett (England)	3–0	(Scotland) Nathan Girvan	76.56

== TV coverage ==
Eurosport and Quest began a three-year deal to cover the event.
