= Gilbert Ulang =

Filipino darts player

Personal information
- Nickname: The Slayer
- Born: 23 July 1979 (age 47) Philippines
- Home town: Pasig, Philippines

Sport
- Sport: Darts
- Playing since: 1999
- Darts: 18 Gram
- Laterality: Right-handed
- Walk-on music: "Hey Baby" by DJ Ötzi

Organisation (see split in darts)
- PDC: 2015–2017

PDC premier events – best performances
- World Championship: Preliminary round: 2017

Other tournament wins
- Tournament: Years
- PDC World Philippines Qualifying Event Hong Kong Open: 2016; 2017

Gilbert Ulang (born July 23, 1979) is a Filipino former darts player.

== Career ==
Ulang represented the Philippines alongside Lourence Ilagan at the 2015 PDC World Cup of Darts, during which they lost in the first round to Belgium's Kim & Ronny Huybrechts. Ulang also competed at the 2016 World Cup with Alex Tagarao as the Philippines reached the second round, where they were eliminated by Michael van Gerwen and Raymond van Barneveld of the Netherlands.

Ulang qualified for the 2017 PDC World Darts Championship after defeating Prussian Dela Crus in the Final of the Philippines Qualifier. He was defeated 2–0 in the preliminary round by fellow debutant Kevin Simm.

Following an investigation into his match with Simm, Ulang was suspended by the Darts Regulation Authority until 17 December 2023 for match fixing.
