= Park H =

Event complex in Hasselt, Belgium

Coordinates: 50.933°N 5.362°E

Park H in Hasselt, Belgium is one of the biggest event complexes in the Benelux. The first halls, the Grenslandhallen, were built in 1983. In 2002 one of the first halls has been transformed into a congress theatre for musicals, concerts, ... up to 5000 people.

In 2004 the complex has been extended with the "Ethias Arena" (now Trixxo Arena), the biggest arena in Belgium, for more than 21,000 people.

In 2018, the Grenslandhallen, were renamed to Park H.

The whole complex has now a surface of almost 35,000 square metres.

Park H includes halls from 400 square metres up to more than 13,000 square metres:

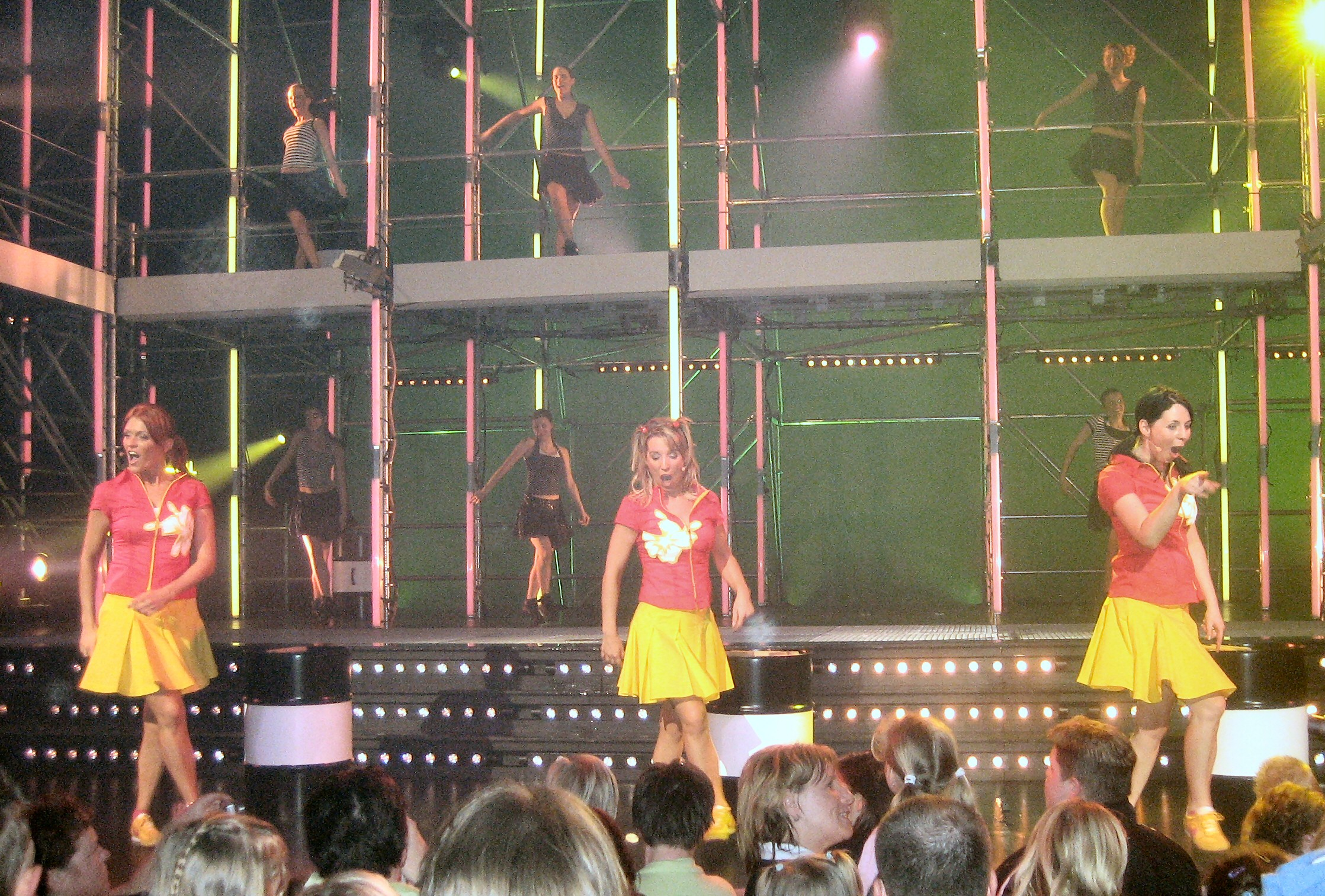
K3 at Park H

- Trixxo Arena
- Trixxo Theater
- Expo Hasselt
- Versuz (dancing)
- Jumpsquare (trampoline park)
- The Park Playground (virtual reality park)
- Plopsa Indoor (theme park)
- Area V (multipurpose hall)
- Crudo (restaurant)

In the end of 2005, Plopsa Indoor Hasselt opened next to the Grenslandhallen. Plopsa Indoor Hasselt is an indoor attraction park for children.
