= Warrick Scheffer =

Personal information
- Nickname: Rooster
- Born: 4 March 1992 (age 34) Durban, South Africa

Sport
- Sport: Darts
- Playing since: 2012
- Darts: 22 Gram
- Laterality: Right-handed
- Walk-on music: "I Made It" by Kevin Rudolf

Organisation (see split in darts)
- PDC: 2015–2018

PDC premier events – best performances
- World Championship: Preliminary round: 2016

Other tournament wins
- Tournament: Years
- PDC World South Africa Qualifying Event PDC Challenge Tour England: 2015; 2017

Warrick Scheffer (born 4 March 1992) is a South African former professional darts player who plays in Professional Darts Corporation (PDC) events.

== Career ==
Scheffer won the 2015 South African Masters to qualify for the 2016 PDC World Darts Championship. He was beaten 2–0 by John Michael in the preliminary round. He played in 2016 Q School, but only won one match over the four days. Scheffer again entered Q School in 2017 and on the final was two wins away from earning a tour card, but he lost 5–2 to Martin Schindler.
