= 2013 Romanian International Darts Open =

The 2013 Romanian International Darts Open was the 4th edition of Romanian International Darts Open, organised by the Romanian Darts Federation. The tournament took place 27–29 October 2013 at Hotel Intercontinental in Bucharest. The winner was Tony O'Shea who beat Ron Meulenkamp form Netherlands, in the final, by 6 legs to 2.

The tournament had, as special guests, the English professional darts players, Darryl Fitton (then rank 3 BDO) and Tony O'Shea (then rank 4 BDO).

== Men's tournament ==
Fifth round (best of 7 legs); 28 September
Darryl Fitton	4
Ionut Simireanu	0
Marin Marinov	3
Karel Sedláček	4
Ron Meulenkamp	4
Ugur Varani	1
Istvan Nyiregyhazki	3
Sam Head	4
Jim Williams	4
Hannes Schnier	0
Ahmet Kulturus	3
Louis Mouzourides	4
Evros Themistocleous	1
Thibault Tricole	4
Alexandru Stoian	0
Tony O'Shea	4

Quarter-finals (best of 7 legs); 28 September
Darryl Fitton	2
Karel Sedláček	4
Ron Meulenkamp	4
Sam Head	3
Jim Williams	4
Louis Mouzourides	0
Thibault Tricole	2
Tony O'Shea	4

Semi-finals (best of 7 legs); 28 September
Karel Sedláček	2
Ron Meulenkamp	5
Jim Williams	3
Tony O'Shea	5

Final (best of 9 legs); 28 September
Ron Meulenkamp	1
Tony O'Shea	6

== Women's tournament ==
Quarter-finals (best of 7 legs); 28 September
Rachna David	4
Andreea Constantinescu	0
Yolanda Korradou	0
Kathy Geeraerts	4
Maret Liiri	4
Daniela Comeaga	1
Jasmin Schnier	0
Anelia Eneva	4

Semi-finals (best of 7 legs); 28 September
Rachna David	4
Kathy Geeraerts	0
Maret Liiri	3
Anelia Eneva	4

Final (best of 9 legs); 28 September
Rachna David	2
Anelia Eneva	5
