= Roz Bulmer =

English darts player

Personal information
- Full name: Rosalyn Bulmer
- Born: 4 May 1979 (age 47) Norwich, Norfolk, England
- Home town: Norwich, Norfolk, England

Sport
- Sport: Darts
- Playing since: 2014
- Darts: 22g
- Laterality: Right-handed
- Walk-on music: "Sweet Child O' Mine" by Guns N' Roses

Organisation (see split in darts)
- BDO: 2014–2020
- WDF: 2014–
- Current world ranking: (WDF W) NR (17 August 2026)

WDF major events – best performances
- World Championship: Last 16: 2019
- World Masters: Last 128: 2019

Rosalyn "Roz" Bulmer (born 4 May 1979 from Norwich) is an English darts player, who played in British Darts Organisation events. She qualified for the 2019 BDO World Darts Championship.

== Career ==
In 2018, Bulmer qualified for the 2019 BDO World Darts Championship as after the year's performances saw her placed 12th on the rankings. She was defeated by Sharon Prins in the first round.

== World Championship results ==
=== BDO ===
- 2019: First Round (lost to Sharon Prins 0–2) (sets)
