= Mark Layton =

Personal information
- Full name: Mark Jay Layton
- Nickname: The Grinder
- Born: 16 October 1957 (age 69) Swansea, Wales
- Home town: Llandrindod Wells, Wales

Sport
- Sport: Darts
- Playing since: 1980
- Darts: 24 Gram
- Laterality: Right-handed
- Walk-on music: "Delilah" by Tom Jones

Organisation (see split in darts)
- BDO: 2000–2005, 2012–2020
- PDC: 2005–2012
- WDF: 2012–

WDF major events – best performances
- World Championship: Last 32: 2019
- World Masters: Last 32: 2013

PDC premier events – best performances
- UK Open: Last 64: 2012

Other tournament wins
- Tournament: Years
- Cheshire Open Gwynedd Open Malta Open: 2015; 2016; 2017

Mark Jay Layton (born 16 October 1957) is a Welsh professional darts player who plays in World Darts Federation events.

In 2018, he qualified for the 2019 BDO World Darts Championship.

== Darts career ==
Layton four televised majors on the PDC UK Open in Last 64 he losing to Dave Chisnall 7–9 (legs).

In 2013, Layton he qualified for the 2013 Winmau World Masters who lost to Ross Montgomery of Scotland 1–3 (sets).

Layton wins of the 2015 Cheshire Open he beating John Bowles in Quarter finals, Alan Tabern in Semi finals and former Lakeside World Champion & 2 times World Masters Champion Stephen Bunting by 6–4 (legs).

Layton winner of the 2016 Gwynedd Open he defeating Simon Hardy of England 5–2 (legs)

Layton won the 2017 Malta Open he defeated Joe Davis of England by 6–2 (legs).

In January 2019, Layton he lost to Wayne Warren by 0–3 (sets) of the 2019 BDO World Darts Championship.

In 2020, Layton joining the PDC Tour Card UK Qualifying in Last 64 he beating Tony Newell & lost to UK Open and Players Championship Quarter Finals Robbie Green.

== World Championship Performances ==
=== BDO ===
- 2019: 1st Round (lost to Wayne Warren 0-3) (sets)
