= Mark Thomson (darts player) =

English darts player

Personal information
- Nickname: "Tommo"
- Born: 5 August 1963 (age 63) Swindon, Wiltshire, England

Sport
- Sport: Darts
- Playing since: 1989
- Darts: 19g Unicorn Darts Bob Anderson
- Laterality: Right-handed
- Walk-on music: "Welcome to the Party" by Dj Krissy

Organisation (see split in darts)
- BDO: 2008–2014
- PDC: 2002–2008

WDF major events – best performances
- World Masters: Last 64: 2010

PDC premier events – best performances
- World Championship: Last 48: 2005
- UK Open: Last 16: 2003, 2005

Other tournament wins
- Years
| Hampshire Open | 2005 |
| Malta Open | 2009 |

Mark "Tommo" Thomson (born 5 August 1963) is an English former professional darts player who played in Professional Darts Corporation (PDC) events.

== Career ==
From Swindon, Wiltshire, Thomson played in six stages on the UK Open, reaching the last 8, but lost to Tommy Wilson of England in 2003 and Mark Walsh of England in 2005.

He played in the 2005 PDC World Darts Championship debut year, but lost in the last 48 to Andy Hamilton of England. He was Runner Up in the 2005 Vauxhall Spring Pro, losing to Colin Lloyd of England.

He won the 2009 Malta Open, defeating by Roy Brown of England.

He played in the 2010 Winmau World Masters, losing to Ronald L. Briones of the Philippines in the last 64.

He won the 2005 National Championship in Stoke-on-Trent. He won the 2005 Hampshire Open beating Lionel Sams 5 – 4 in the final. Along with Lionel Sams winning the Dutch pairs in 2005.

He played events in the World ParaDarts (WPD) since June 2026.

== Personal life ==
Thomson is married to Allison from Swindon, Wiltshire.

== World Championship performances ==
=== PDC ===
- 2005: Last 48: (lost to Andy Hamilton 0–3) (sets)
