= John Michael (darts player) =

Greek darts player (born 1974)

Personal information
- Full name: Yannis Michail
- Nickname: "Deadly Rose"
- Born: 20 March 1974 (age 52) Cyprus
- Home town: Athens, Greece

Sport
- Sport: Darts
- Playing since: 1989
- Darts: 23g Cuesoul
- Laterality: Right-handed
- Walk-on music: "Zorbas" by Mikis Theodorakis

Organisation (see split in darts)
- BDO: 1999–2009, 2012–2015, 2018
- PDC: 2009–2011, 2015–2017, 2019–

WDF major events – best performances
- World Championship: Last 40: 2014
- World Masters: Last 32: 2013

PDC premier events – best performances
- World Championship: Last 64: 2015, 2016, 2017
- UK Open: Last 16: 2017
- European Championship: Last 32: 2011

Other tournament wins
- Years
Austrian Open	2009
Cyprus Open	2006, 2007, 2009, 2011, 2014, 2025 X2, 2026
GDO Open	2012
Greek Ch'ship	2001, 2002, 2003, 2004, 2005, 2006, 2007, 2008, 2009, 2010,2011, 2012, 2013, 2016, 2018, 2023, 2024,2026
Greek Open	2006, 2008, 2009, 2010, 2013, 2014
Hellinikon Open	2009, 2010, 2011, 2013
Malta Open	2004, 2007, 2012, 2018
Mediterranean Cup	2009
Romanian Classic	2019
PDC South European Qualifier	2014, 2015, 2016, 2021

John Michael (born Yannis Michail, 20 March 1974) is a Cypriot-born Greek darts player who competes in Professional Darts Corporation (PDC) and World Darts Federation (WDF) events.

== Career ==
=== PDC ===
He joined the PDC in 2009, and began competing in PDC Europe events a year later. He qualified for the 2011 European Championship, therefore becoming the first Greek player to qualify for a major PDC tournament. He was beaten 3–6 by defending champion Phil Taylor in the first round, with Taylor averaging 107.83.

=== BDO ===
He joined the BDO in 2012. Michael has won numerous WDF-ranked darts tournaments, including the Cyprus Open (four times), the Greek Open (four times) and the Hellinikon Open (three times). He qualified for the 2015 PDC World Darts Championship while still playing in British Darts Organisation events. He played Jani Haavisto in the preliminary round winning 4–1 in legs, in the first round he played Ian White losing 3–1 in sets.

=== Return to the PDC ===
Michael rejoined the PDC in 2015. After beating South Africa's Warrick Scheffer 2–0 in sets in the preliminary round of the 2016 PDC World Darts Championship, he was whitewashed by seventh-seed James Wade, 0–3 in sets. He entered the PDC's qualifying school that year, and his performance was good enough for second place on the Q School Order of Merit, earning him a PDC Tour Card.

Being unable to enter all the events meant that Michael was unable to retain his Tour Card, but he went to European Q-School in January 2019 and was able to regain his card, finishing fifth on the Order of Merit.

After ending 2020 ranked 106th, Michael had to attend Qualifying School but successfully regained his Tour Card at the first time of asking.

=== 2023– ===
Although he bypassed the first stage of 2023 European Q-School, Michael fell shy of retaining his Tour Card, finishing 19th in the Order of Merit.

In January 2025, he was the runner-up at the Romanian Open, losing 5–2 to Brian Raman in the final.

== World Championship results ==
=== BDO ===
- 2014: Preliminary round (lost to Madars Razma 2–3)

=== PDC ===
- 2015: First round (lost to Ian White 1–3)
- 2016: First round (lost to James Wade 0–3)
- 2017: First round (lost to Alan Norris 2–3)
- 2022: First round (lost to Martijn Kleermaker 1–3)

== Personal life ==
Michael works as a farrier in Athens.
