= Malta Open =

Tournament information
- Venue: Kirkop Sports Complex
- Location: Kirkop
- Country: Malta
- Established: 1976
- Organisation(s): WDF
- Format: Sets (1976–2015 in men's finals); Legs
- Prize fund: €8,000
- Month(s) Played: November

Current champion(s)
- Norbert Attard (men's); Lerena Rietbergen (women's)

The Malta Open is an annual darts tournament on the WDF circuit that began in 1976.

== Results ==
=== Men's ===
Year	Champion	Av.	Score	Runner-Up	Av.	Prize Money			Venue
Year	Champion	Av.	Score	Runner-Up	Av.	Total	Ch.	R.-Up	Venue
1976	(Scotland) Harry Heenan	n/a	2 – 0	(Malta) Ronald Manaire	n/a	–	–	–	Palace Theatre, Paola
1986	(Wales) Peter Harding	n/a	2 – 0	(England) Granville Williams	n/a	MTL 880	MTL 500	MTL 200	Radio City, Hamrun
1988	(England) Alan Warriner	n/a	2 – 0	(England) Dave Askew	n/a	MTL 880	MTL 500	MTL 200	Radio City, Hamrun
1989	(England) Andy Waugh	n/a	2 – 1	(Scotland) Bob Taylor	n/a	MTL 880	MTL 500	MTL 200	Grand Hotel Verdala, Rabat
1990	Phil Taylor	n/a	2 – 0	(United States) Steve Brown	n/a	MTL 880	MTL 500	MTL 200	Corradino Sports Pavilion, Paola
1991	(England) Rod Harrington	n/a	2 – 0	(United States) Steve Brown	n/a	MTL 880	MTL 500	MTL 200	Jerma Palace, Marsascala
1993	(Malta) Vincent Busuttil	n/a	2 – 1	(Malta) Carmelio Fenech	n/a	MTL 880	MTL 500	MTL 200	Pembroke Venue, Pembroke
1994	(England) Paul Smith	n/a	2 – 0	(England) Paul Doggett	n/a	MTL 880	MTL 500	MTL 200	Giardino Restaurant, Swieqi
1995	(England) Ted Hankey	n/a	2 – 0	(Malta) Vincent Busuttil	n/a	MTL 880	MTL 500	MTL 200	St. Nicholas Hall, Paola
1996	(England) Ted Hankey (2)	n/a	2 – 0	(Malta) Gordon Stanmore	n/a	MTL 880	MTL 500	MTL 200	Stefano Zerafa School, Naxxar
1997	(Cyprus) George Trypiniotis	n/a	2 – 1	(Malta) Godfrey Abela	n/a	MTL 880	MTL 500	MTL 200	Stefano Zerafa School, Naxxar
1998	(England) Gary Spedding	n/a	2 – 0	(Sweden) Gunnar Glasö	n/a	MTL 880	MTL 500	MTL 200	Stefano Zerafa School, Naxxar
1999	(Wales) Sean Palfrey	n/a	2 – 0	(Malta) Terry Adoltho	n/a	MTL 880	MTL 500	MTL 200	Stefano Zerafa School, Naxxar
2000	(Malta) Andy Keen	n/a	2 – 0	(Wales) Kerry Feltham	n/a	MTL 880	MTL 500	MTL 200	Stefano Zerafa School, Naxxar
2001	(Malta) Andy Keen (2)	n/a	2 – 0	(Cyprus) Marios Demetriou	n/a	MTL 880	MTL 500	MTL 200	Jerma Palace, Marsascala
2002	(Malta) Andy Keen (3)	n/a	2 – 0	(England) Roy Turner	n/a	MTL 880	MTL 500	MTL 200	Jerma Palace, Marsascala
2003	(Malta) Andy Keen (4)	n/a	2 – 1	John Michael	n/a	MTL 880	MTL 500	MTL 200	Jerma Palace, Marsascala
2004	John Michael	n/a	2 – 1	(Italy) Marco Apollonio	n/a	MTL 880	MTL 500	MTL 200	Jerma Palace, Marsascala
2005	(England) Joe Palmer	n/a	2 – 0	(England) David Hirst	n/a	MTL 880	MTL 500	MTL 200	Jerma Palace, Marsascala
2006	(Germany) Michael Rosenauer	n/a	2 – 0	(Malta) Godfrey Abela	n/a	MTL 880	MTL 500	MTL 200	Dolmen Hotel, Qawra
2007	John Michael (2)	n/a	2 – 1	(Germany) Colin Rice	n/a	MTL 880	MTL 500	MTL 200	Dolmen Hotel, Qawra
2008	Jermaine Wattimena	n/a	2 – 1	(Malta) Vincent Busuttil	n/a	€2,050	€1,200	€450	Topaz Hotel, Bugibba
2009	(England) Mark Thomson	n/a	2 – 1	(England) Roy Brown	n/a	€2,050	€1,200	€450	Topaz Hotel, Bugibba
2010	(England) Roy Brown	n/a	2 – 1	(Malta) Andy Keen	n/a	€2,050	€1,200	€450	Topaz Hotel, Bugibba
2011	(England) Paul Harvey	n/a	2 – 0	(Germany) Colin Rice	n/a	€2,050	€1,200	€450	Topaz Hotel, Bugibba
2012	John Michael (3)	n/a	2 – 0	(Germany) Klaus Rohlederer	n/a	€2,050	€1,200	€450	Topaz Hotel, Bugibba
2013	(England) Ricky Williams	n/a	2 – 0	(Malta) Andy Keen	n/a	€2,050	€1,200	€450	Topaz Hotel, Bugibba
2014	(England) John Walton	n/a	2 – 0	(Greece) Kostas Pantelidis	n/a	€2,050	€1,200	€450	Topaz Hotel, Bugibba
2015	(Turkey) Ümit Uygunsözlü	n/a	2 – 1	(England) John Walton	n/a	€2,050	€1,200	€450	Topaz Hotel, Bugibba
2016	(England) Paul Williams	94.80	6 – 2	(England) Dave Prins	87.69	€2,050	€1,200	€450	Topaz Hotel, Bugibba
2017	(Wales) Mark Layton	n/a	6 – 2	Joe Davis	n/a	€3,500	€1,500	€450	Cottonera Sports Complex, Cospicua
2018	John Michael (4)	n/a	6 – 3	Andy Hamilton	n/a	€3,500	€1,500	€450	Montekristo Estates, Luqa
2019	Joe Davis	n/a	6 – 4	Thibault Tricole	n/a	€5,600	€1,600	€800	Montekristo Estates, Luqa
2021	John Desreumaux	n/a	5 – 3	John Scott	n/a	€5,600	€1,600	€800	Kirkop Sports Complex, Kirkop
2022	Richard North	76.99	5 – 2	Gary Blackwood	82.21	€5,600	€1,600	€800	Kirkop Sports Complex, Kirkop
2023	Michael Busscher	77.10	5 – 3	Marcus Maier	79.20	€5,600	€1,600	€800	Kirkop Sports Complex, Kirkop
2024	Norbert Attard	89.15	5 – 2	Thomas Junghans	73.40	€5,600	€1,600	€800	Kirkop Sports Complex, Kirkop
2025	HungaryAndrás Borbély	82.21	5 – 3	Thomas Junghans	78.54	€5,600	€1,600	€800	Malta Fair & Convention Centre Ta Qali, Ta Qali

=== Women's ===
Year	Champion	Score	Runner-up	Total Prize Money	Champion	Runner-up
1986	(Wales) Linda Rogers-Pickett	3–1	(England) Diane Hare			
1988	(England) Jayne Kempster	4–3	(England) Joan Parmley			
1989	(England) Jayne Kempster	4–0	(England) Michela Crump			
1990	(England) Sharon Colclough	4–1	(Finland) Päivi Jussila			
1991	(Scotland) Betty Rodgers	4–0	(England) Christie Allen			
1992	(England) Mandy Solomons	4–3	(Wales) Linda Rogers-Pickett			
1993	(England) Lucy Lang	3–2	(England) Meg Barnes			
1994	(England) Louise Perry	4–2	(England) Carole Wright			
1995	(England) Rebecca Hoyland-Cropper	4–2	(England) Irene Hancock			
1996	(England) Rebecca Hoyland-Cropper	4–1	(England) Pam Hind			
1997	(England) Crissy Manley	4–1	(England) Yvonne Whitley			
1998	(Wales) Tricia Wright	4–1	(England) Pam Hind			
1999	(England) Rebecca Hoyland-Cropper	4–0	(England) Rebecca Rose			
2000	(Malta) Judy Nuthall	4–2	(England) Stephanie Keen			
2001	(England) Jackie Hampshire	4–3	(Malta) Judy Nuthall			
2002	(England) Michelle Jackson	4–2	(England) Laura Tweeddale			
2003	(Malta) Helen Bonello	4–3	(Malta) Tessie Bilocca			
2004	(Germany) Bianca Ehlen	4–1	(Cyprus) Ann Rose			
2005	(England) Jackie Hampshire	4–0	(Malta) Joyce Fenech			
2006	(England) Wendy Reinstadtler	4–1	(England) Jackie Hampshire			
2007	(England) Margaret Sutton	4–0	(England) Joyce Stanton			
2008	(England) Jane Stubbs	4–2	(England) Margaret Sutton			
2009	(England) Wendy Reinstadtler	4–2	(England) Margaret Sutton			
2010	(England) Kerry Simmonds	4–2	(England) Wendy Reinstadtler			
2011	(England) Diane Nash	4–3	(England) Margaret Sutton			
2012	(England) Casey Gallagher	4–1	(Sweden) Anette Tillbom			
2013	(England) Suzanne Smith	4–2	(England) Casey Gallagher			
2014	(Norway) Vibeke Solvik	4–0	(Denmark) Kirsten Byø			
2015	(Germany) Ann-Kathrin Wigmann	4–1	(Sweden) Kristin Bomander			
2016	(England) Christine Readhead	4–0	(England) Kaz Kirkby			
2017	(England) Deta Hedman	4–2	(Netherlands) Aileen de Graaf			
2018	(England) Deta Hedman	4–0	(England) Julie Thompson	€2,400		
2019	(England) Joanne Locke	4–2	(England) Paula Jacklin	€2,400		
2021	(England) Paula Jacklin	5–4	(Italy) Aurora Fochesato	€2,400		
2022	(Netherlands) Aletta Wajer	5–3	(Hungary) Veronika Ihász	€2,400		
2023	(Netherlands) Noa-Lynn van Leuven	5–3	(Germany) Irina Armstrong	€2,400		
2024	(Netherlands) Lerena Rietbergen	5–2	(Germany) Lisa Zollikofer	€2,400	€800	€400

=== Youth's ===
Year	Champion	Av.	Score	Runner-Up	Av.	Prize Money			Venue
Year	Champion	Av.	Score	Runner-Up	Av.	Total	Ch.	R.-Up	Venue
2022	Kyle Satariano	48.19	5–4	Matti Satariano	51.01	–	–	–	Kirkop Sports Complex, Kirkop
2023	(England) Ryan Branley	70.90	5–0	Kyle Satariano	51.06	–	–	–	Kirkop Sports Complex, Kirkop
2024	(Netherlands) Milan Brinkman	68.23	5–1	(Belgium) Luca Hessens	63.66	–	–	–	Kirkop Sports Complex, Kirkop

== Tournament records ==
- Most wins 4: (Malta) Andy Keen, (Greece) John Michael.
- Most Finals 6: (Malta) Andy Keen.
- Most Semi Finals 10: (Malta) Andy Keen.
- Most Quarter Finals 13: (Malta) Andy Keen.
- Most Appearances 14: (Malta) Andy Keen.
- Most Prize Money won €5,748: (Malta) Andy Keen.
- Youngest Winner age 20: (Netherlands) Jermaine Wattimena.
- Oldest Winner age 60: (Wales) Mark Layton.

== See also ==
- List of BDO ranked tournaments
- List of WDF tournaments
