= 2019 BDO & WDF calendar =

Tournament information
- Dates: Yearly
- Country: Worldwide
- Organisation(s): BDO, WDF
- Format: 501 Legs (men's & women's)
- Prize fund: Depends on tournament's category

2019 BDO & WDF season of darts comprises every tournament of British Darts Organisation and World Darts Federation. The category or prize money of the tournaments may be vary depending on darts organization.

BDO and WDF most important tournaments are the BDO World Darts Championship and WDF World Cup.

== Tournament categories, points & prize money ==
=== BDO ===
British Darts Organization		Points						
Category	Prize Fund (£)	1st	2nd	3/4	5/8	9/16	17/32	33/48
Special Events	–	49	42	35	28	21	14	7
A+	£10,000	49	42	35	28	21	14	7
A	£7,000	35	30	25	20	15	10	5
B	£5,000	24	20	16	12	8	4	
C	£3,000	18	15	12	9	6	3	
D	£1,000	14	12	10	8	6		

=== WDF ===
World Darts Federation		Points							
Category	Prize Fund ($)	1st	2nd	3/4	5/8	9/16	17/32	33/64	65/128
M	–	180	126	88	44	22	11	6	3
1	–	150	105	74	37	18	9	5	0
2	–	120	84	59	29	15	7	4	0
3	–	90	63	44	22	11	6	0	0

== Calendar ==
=== January ===
Date	Tournament	BDO		WDF		Venue	City	Prize money	Men's			Women's		
Date	Tournament	M	W	M	W	Venue	City	Prize money	winner	score	runner-up	winner	score	runner-up
January 5–13	BDO World Championship	WC				Lakeside Leisure Complex	(England) Frimley Green	£329,000	(England) Glen Durrant	7–3	(England) Scott Waites	(Japan) Mikuru Suzuki	3–0	(England) Lorraine Winstanley
January 13	Cyprus Open			3	3	Panthea Holiday Village	(Cyprus) Ayia Napa	€2,070	(Cyprus) Ermos Korradou	bt.	(Cyprus) Wayne Halliwell			
January 13	Quebec Open			3	3	Hotel Universel	(Canada) Drummondville	$3,750	(Canada) Ross Snook	bt.	(Canada) Jacques Dionne	(Canada) Darlene Van Sleeuwen	bt.	(Canada) Danna Foster
January 19	Las Vegas Open	C	C	2	2	Tuscany Suites and Casino	(United States) Las Vegas	$6,325	(United States) Robbie Phillips	bt.	(Canada) Shawn Brenneman	(United States) Sandy Hudson	bt.	(United States) Paula Murphy
January 26	Tri City Open	D	D	3	3	The Inn of Waterloo	(Canada) Waterloo	$2,910	(Canada) Bill Crawford	bt.	(Canada) Darrin Allen	(Canada) Cindy Pardy	bt.	(Canada) Kim Whaley-Hilts
January 26–27	Romanian Classic	C	C	1	2	InterContinental Hotel	(Romania) Bucharest	RON 24,160	(Greece) John Michael	6–5	(Netherlands) Derk Telnekes	(Poland) Karolina Podgórska	5–3	(England) Margaret Sutton
January 27	Romanian International	B	C	1	2	InterContinental Hotel	(Romania) Bucharest	RON 34,530	(England) Dave Parletti	6–5	(England) Gary Robson	(Netherlands) Aileen de Graaf	5–3	(England) Deta Hedman

=== February ===
Date	Tournament	BDO		WDF		Venue	City	Prize money	Men's			Women's		
Date	Tournament	M	W	M	W	Venue	City	Prize money	winner	score	runner-up	winner	score	runner-up
February 2	Canterbury Classic	D	D			Canterbury Darts Association	(New Zealand) Christchurch	NZ$3,000	(New Zealand) Darren Herewini	6–4	(New Zealand) Mark McGrath	(New Zealand) Desi Mercer	5–4	(New Zealand) Judy Fenton
February 2–3	Dutch Open	A+	A+	M	M	De Bonte Wever	(Netherlands) Assen	€33,350	(Netherlands) Richard Veenstra	3–2	(Scotland) Ryan Hogarth	(Japan) Mikuru Suzuki	5–2	(Netherlands) Aileen de Graaf
February 9	Camellia Classic	D	C			Crowne Plaza Hotel	(United States) Sacramento	$5,420	(United States) Leonard Gates	bt.	(United States) Chris Lim	(United States) Stacey Pace	bt.	(Mongolia) Erdenechimeg Dondov
February 16	Syracuse Open	D	C			Holiday Inn	(United States) Liverpool	$5,110	(United States) Matt Campbell	bt.	(United States) Darin Young	(United States) Carolyn Mars	bt.	(United States) Stacey Pace
February 17	Scottish Open	A	B			Normandy Cosmopolitan Hotel	(Scotland) Renfrew	£10,550	(Netherlands) Wesley Harms	6–5	(New Zealand) Cody Harris	(England) Lisa Ashton	5–1	(England) Fallon Sherrock
February 22–23	Slovak Masters	B	B	2	3	x-bionic® sphere	(Slovakia) Šamorín	€8,460	(England) Tony Martin	6–1	(England) Scott Mitchell	(Russia) Anastasia Dobromyslova	5–0	(England) Kirsty Hutchinson
February 23	Slovak Open	A	A	2	3	x-bionic® sphere	(Slovakia) Šamorín	€11,540	(Netherlands) Wesley Harms	6–5	(England) Adam Smith-Neale	(England) Maria O'Brien	5–2	(England) Lisa Ashton
February 23	Port City Open	D	C			Holiday Inn Portland-by the Bay	(United States) Portland	$4,550	(Canada) Jeff Smith	4–3	(United States) Joe Chaney	(United States) Cali West	4–3	(Canada) Joanne Luke

=== March ===
Date	Tournament	BDO		WDF		Venue	City	Prize money	Men's			Women's		
Date	Tournament	M	W	M	W	Venue	City	Prize money	winner	score	runner-up	winner	score	runner-up
March 2	Selangor Open			2	3	Oriental Crystal Hotel	(Malaysia) Kajang	RM 3,000	(Malaysia) Meena Sundram	bt.	(Malaysia) Azmi Bin Norudin	(Malaysia) Nur Sazleena Muliyono	bt.	(Philippines) Angelyn Detablan
March 2–3	Halifax Open	D	D	3	3	Bedford Legion Club	(Canada) Bedford	C$2,560	(Canada) Jeff Smith	bt.	(Canada) Joslain Bourque	(Canada) Joanne Luke	bt.	(Canada) Tracy Powers
March 7	Isle of Man Classic	B	A			Villa Marina	(Isle of Man) Douglas	£8,000	(Netherlands) Richard Veenstra	4–1	(Netherlands) Willem Mandigers	(England) Lorraine Winstanley	4–2	(England) Fallon Sherrock
March 8	Isle of Man Masters			2	2	Villa Marina	(Isle of Man) Douglas	£1,498	(Netherlands) Wesley Harms	4–3	(England) Andy Hamilton	(England) Lisa Ashton	4–2	(England) Fallon Sherrock
March 9	Isle of Man Open	A+	A+			Villa Marina	(Isle of Man) Douglas	£15,500	(England) Scott Waites	5–0	(Netherlands) Richard Veenstra	(England) Laura Turner	4–2	(England) Deta Hedman
March 12	Torremolinos Open	C	C			Sol Príncipe Hotel	(Spain) Torremolinos	£4,140	(France) Thibault Tricole	5–1	(Netherlands) Kay Smeets	(England) Paula Jacklin	4–1	(Northern Ireland) Donna Gleed
March 14–15	Torremolinos Classic	C	C			Sol Príncipe Hotel	(Spain) Torremolinos	£4,140	(England) Nick Fullwell	5–4	(England) Craig Venman	(Northern Ireland) Donna Gleed	4–2	(England) Paula Jacklin
March 16–17	Greater Vancouver Open	D	C	2	3	Sheraton Vancouver Airport Hotel	(Canada) Richmond	$5,440	(Canada) Josh Wood	bt.	(Canada) Nelson Bacus	(Canada) Maggie Holyk	bt.	(Canada) Alexandra Foulds
March 16–17	Hub City Open	D	D			Shediac Multi Purpose Centre	(Canada) Shediac	C$3,940	(Canada) Dave Cameron	5–3	(Canada) Jeff Smith	(Canada) Hayley Crowley	4–2	(Canada) Emily Alford
March 16	Gibraltar Open			3	3	Grand Battery House	Gibraltar	£1,880	(Gibraltar) Dyson Parody	4–3	(Spain) Jesús Salate	(England) Paula Jacklin	bt.	(England) Bonnii Bentley
March 16	West Fries Open	B	B			Sportcentrum Hoorn	(Netherlands) Hoorn	€8,660	(Netherlands) Martijn Kleermaker	3–1	(Wales) Nick Kenny	(England) Kirsty Hutchinson	5–2	(England) Laura Turner
March 17	West Fries Masters	B	B			Sportcentrum Hoorn	(Netherlands) Hoorn	€8,660	(Netherlands) Martijn Kleermaker	4–0	(Netherlands) Roemer Mooijman	(England) Deta Hedman	5–1	(Netherlands) Sharon Prins
March 16	Sylt Open			3	3	Sportzentrum Tinnum	(Germany) Sylt	€4,800	(Germany) Aaron Rahlfs	7–1	(Germany) Tayfun Yerlikaya	(Germany) Lisa Zollikofer	6–5	(Germany) Lena Zollikofer
March 17	Sylt Classics			3	3	Sportzentrum Tinnum	(Germany) Sylt	€3,000	(Germany) Daniel Zygla	6–3	(Germany) Aaron Rahlfs	(Germany) Irina Armstrong	5–4	(Germany) Kathrin Detjens
March 17	West Coast Classic	C	C			Belmont Sports & Recreation Club	(Australia) Cloverdale	AU$2,000	(Australia) David Platt	bt.	(Australia) Mal Cuming	(Australia) Tori Kewish	5–0	(Australia) Barb Smyth
March 23	Virginia Beach Classic	C	C			Wyndham Virginia Beach Oceanfront	(United States) Virginia Beach	$6,570	(United States) Leonard Gates	4–0	(Canada) Dave Cameron	(United States) Cali West	4–2	(United States) Stacey Pace
March 23–24	Acropolis Open	D	C	3	3	Athenaeum Palace & Luxury Suites	(Greece) Athens	€4,270	(Italy) Stefano Tomassetti	6–3	(France) Thibault Tricole	(England) Paula Jacklin	6–5	(Romania) Andreea Brad
March 24	Greek Open	C	B	3	3	Athenaeum Palace & Luxury Suites	(Greece) Athens	€6,460	(France) Thibault Tricole	6–2	(Poland) Sebastian Steyer	(England) Paula Jacklin	6–3	(England) Sue Cusick

=== April ===
Date	Tournament	BDO		WDF		Venue	City	Prize money	Men's			Women's		
Date	Tournament	M	W	M	W	Venue	City	Prize money	winner	score	runner-up	winner	score	runner-up
March 29–Apr. 1	Egypt Open			3	3	Blue House Hotel	(Egypt) Marsa Alam	$27,000	(Philippines) Alain Abiabi	bt.	(Estonia) Alvar Paia	(Egypt) Marwa Shannon	bt.	(Egypt) Aisha Mohammed
April 5–6	Mediterranean Open			3	3	Grand Haber Hotel	(Turkey) Kemer	–	(Turkey) Alper Subaşı	bt.	(Turkey) Furkan Gültekin	(Turkey) Emine Dursun	bt.	(Turkey) Pelin Kösten
April 6–7	The Main Event	D	D			ANAVETS club	(Canada) Saskatoon	C$5,100	(Canada) Shawn Currie	bt.	(Canada) Mike Dwyer	(Canada) Kristin Kovitch	bt.	(Canada) Kim Bellay-Rousselle
April 13	Charlotte Open	D	D	3	3	Sheraton Airport Hotel	(United States) Charlotte	$2,880	(United States) Leonard Gates	5–2	(United States) Danny Baggish	(United States) Paula Murphy	4–0	(United States) Debbie Ivey
April 13	Bull's German Open	A	B	M	1	Wunderland Kalkar	(Germany) Kalkar	€10,800	(Belgium) Mario Vandenbogaerde	6–5	(Netherlands) Martijn Kleermaker	(Netherlands) Aileen de Graaf	5–4	(England) Fallon Sherrock
April 14	Bull's Darts Masters	B	B	1	2	Wunderland Kalkar	(Germany) Kalkar	€9,020	(England) Brian Dawson	6–4	(Netherlands) Wesley Harms	(Australia) Corrine Hammond	5–4	(England) Lorraine Winstanley
April 20	South Island Masters	D	D			The Appleby Complex	(New Zealand) Invercargill	NZ$2,880	(New Zealand) Ben Robb	6–1	(New Zealand) Darren Herewini	(New Zealand) Desi Mercer	5–2	(New Zealand) Katila Rickerby
April 20	Iceland Open	D	D	3	3	Hlégarður	(Iceland) Mosfellsbær	£2,200	(Scotland) Dennis Watt	7–1	(Iceland) Alex Pétursson	(Iceland) Ingibjörg Magnúsdóttir	7–6	(Iceland) Petrea Friðriksdóttir
April 20	Estonia Open	D	D	3	3	Radisson Blu Hotel Tallinn	(Estonia) Tallinn	€2,530	(England) John Scott	5–4	(Sweden) Tobias Lundblad	(Finland) Kaisu Rekinen	4–0	(Finland) Marika Juhola
April 21	Estonia Masters	D	D	3	3	Radisson Blu Hotel Tallinn	(Estonia) Tallinn	€1,990	(England) John Scott	5–4	(Estonia) Paavo Myller	(Romania) Andreea Brad	4–0	(Latvia) Marija Ružāne
April 21	Victorian Easter Classic	C	C			Geelong Darts Club	(Australia) Geelong	AU$4,800	(Australia) Adam Rowe	7–6	(Australia) Justin Thompson	(Australia) Joanne Hadley	6–3	(Australia) Leanne Wilson
April 22	Geelong Club Classic	D	D			Geelong Darts Club	(Australia) Geelong	AU$4,800	(Australia) Justin Thompson	7–1	(Australia) Brandon Weening	(Australia) Tori Kewish	6–1	(Australia) Amanda Loch
April 27	Cleveland Extravaganza	D	D	3	3	Holiday Inn	(United States) Strongsville	$3,170	(United States) Joe Chaney	5–3	(United States) Tom Sawyer	(United States) Cali West	5–2	(United States) Stacey Pace
April 28	Murray Bridge GP	C	C			Murray Bridge Darts Club	(Australia) White Hill	AU$5,930	(Australia) Peter Machin	4–3	(Australia) Jeremy Fagg	(Australia) Tori Kewish	3–0	(Australia) Nancy Myers
April 28	North Island Masters	D	D	3	3	Hastings Dart Hall	(New Zealand) Hastings	NZ$3,980	(New Zealand) Tahuna Irwin	6–3	(New Zealand) Mark Cleaver	(New Zealand) Judy Fenton	5–0	(New Zealand) Wendy Harper

=== May ===
Date	Tournament	BDO		WDF		Venue	City	Prize money	Men's			Women's		
Date	Tournament	M	W	M	W	Venue	City	Prize money	winner	score	runner-up	winner	score	runner-up
May 4	Denmark Open	A+	A+	1	2	Granly Hockey Arena	(Denmark) Esbjerg	DKK130,300	(Netherlands) Wesley Harms	6–3	(Netherlands) Willem Mandigers	(England) Fallon Sherrock	4–1	(Japan) Mikuru Suzuki
May 5	Denmark Masters	A	A	1	2	Granly Hockey Arena	(Denmark) Esbjerg	DKK87,100	(Belgium) Brian Raman	6–3	(Netherlands) Willem Mandigers	(England) Fallon Sherrock	5–3	(Russia) Anastasia Dobromyslova
May 4–5	Newfoundland Spring Open	D	D			CLB Armoury	(Canada) St. John's	C$2,550	(Canada) John Norman Jnr	bt.	(Canada) Jason Curnew	(Canada) Hayley Crowley	4–3	(Canada) Patricia Farrell
May 10	Welsh Classic	A	B			Prestatyn Sands Holiday Park	(Wales) Prestatyn	£9,760	(England) Dave Parletti	6–4	(England) Martin Adams	(England) Beau Greaves	5–2	(Russia) Anastasia Dobromyslova
May 10–11	Mediterranean Cup			–	–	Hotel Best Cap	(Catalonia) Salou	–	(Romania) László Kádár	4–2	(Spain) José Ángel Castillo	(Turkey) Emine Dursun	4–1	(France) Carole Frison
May 11	Lithuania Open	D	D	3	3	Panorama Hotel	(Lithuania) Vilnius	€1,730	(England) Martin Barratt	6–3	(Netherlands) Alexander Merkx	(Finland) Kirsi Viinikainen	bt.	(Sweden) Heléne Sundelin
May 12	Vilnius Open	D	D			Panorama Hotel	(Lithuania) Vilnius	€1,730	(Netherlands) Jeffrey Sparidaans	6–1	(Netherlands) Ad van Haaren	(Finland) Kirsi Viinikainen	5–1	(Finland) Kaisu Rekinen
May 12	Welsh Open	A+	A+			Prestatyn Sands Holiday Park	(Wales) Prestatyn	£24,180	(Netherlands) Martijn Kleermaker	6–5	(Wales) Jim Williams	(England) Beau Greaves	5–3	(England) Lisa Ashton
May 18	Polish Open	C	C	2	2	Hotel Dobosz	(Poland) Police	zł20,200	(Netherlands) Toon Greebe	6–3	(Poland) Sebastian Steyer	(Denmark) Fie Skinnes	5–4	(Germany) Stefanie Rennoch
May 19	Police Masters	D	D	2	2	Hotel Dobosz	(Poland) Police	zł15,500	(Wales) Mark Blandford	6–4	(Netherlands) Toon Greebe	(England) Deta Hedman	5–1	(Czech Republic) Anna Hlavová
May 26	Sunshine State Classic	D	D			Inala Darts Club	(Australia) Inala	AU$5,900	(Australia) Gordon Mathers	7–6	(Australia) Jeremy Fagg	(New Zealand) Wendy Harper	6–4	(Australia) Tori Kewish

=== June ===
Date	Tournament	BDO		WDF		Venue	City	Prize money	Men's			Women's		
Date	Tournament	M	W	M	W	Venue	City	Prize money	winner	score	runner-up	winner	score	runner-up
June 1	Oregon Open	D	D			Chinook Winds Casino	(United States) Lincoln City	$2,160	(United States) Patrick Kithi	4–3	(United States) Michael Yaksitch	(United States) Renee Ripol	4–3	(United States) Carole Herriott
June 2	Canterbury Open	D	D	3	3	Canterbury Darts Association	(New Zealand) Christchurch	NZ$8,500	(New Zealand) Darren Herewini	6–4	(New Zealand) Jonathan Silcock	(New Zealand) Tina Osborne	5–4	(New Zealand) Jo Steed
June 2	Lincolnshire Open	D	D			The Blues Club	(England) Gainsborough	£2,512	(England) Graham Usher	5–1	(England) Nick Fullwell	(Russia) Anastasia Dobromyslova	4–3	(England) Deta Hedman
June 8	Swiss Open	B	B	2	3	Chliriethalle	(Switzerland) Oberglatt	CHF18,500	(Switzerland) Thomas Junghans	3–2	(Netherlands) Dennie Kalter	(England) Deta Hedman	2–1	(England) Laura Turner
June 9	Helvetia Open	C	C	3	3	Chliriethalle	(Switzerland) Oberglatt	CHF18,500	(Scotland) Alan Soutar	5–4	(Switzerland) Thomas Junghans	(England) Fallon Sherrock	4–3	(England) Laura Turner
June 15	New Zealand Masters	D	D	3	3	Kapi Mana Darts Association	(New Zealand) Porirua	NZ$5,060	(New Zealand) Tahuna Irwin	6–2	(New Zealand) Jonathan Silcock	(New Zealand) Wendy Harper	5–3	(Australia) Tori Kewish
June 15	Canadian Open	C	B	2	2	Inn & Conference Centre	(Canada) Saskatoon	C$8,750	(Canada) Jeff Smith	bt.	(Canada) David Cameron	(Canada) Dianne Gobeil	bt.	(Canada) Crystal Chiasson
June 14–16	England National Singles	B	B			Bunn Leisure Holiday Centre	(England) Selsey	£7,300	(Netherlands) Wesley Harms	6–4	(Wales) Wayne Warren	(England) Beau Greaves	4–2	(Wales) Rhian Griffiths
June 15–16	England Open	A+	A+			Bunn Leisure Holiday Centre	(England) Selsey	£21,600	(Wales) Jim Williams	6–1	(Wales) Wayne Warren	(England) Beau Greaves	5–4	(England) Fallon Sherrock
June 22	Austrian Open Vienna	D	D	2	3	Hilton Garden Inn	(Austria) Vienna	€2,040	(Belgium) Sven Verdonck	6–2	(Austria) Markus Straub	(Finland) Kaisu Rekinen	5–2	(Czech Republic) Jitka Císařová
June 22	Cherry Bomb Int'l.	D	D			DoubleTree by Hilton	(United States) Deerfield Beach	$2,390	(United States) Danny Baggish	bt.	(The Bahamas) Robin Albury	(United States) Kris Grimal	4–1	(United States) Debbie Ivey
June 21–23	Six Nations Cup (T)	–	–			De Bonte Wever	(Netherlands) Assen	£3,000	Netherlands	13–5	Wales	England	5–0	Northern Ireland
June 23	Australian Grand Masters	B	B			Canberra Labour Club	(Australia) Canberra	AU$11,300	(Australia) Aaron Morrison	7–6	(Australia) Mike Bonser	(Australia) Tori Kewish	6–2	(Australia) Barb Smyth
June 23	LDO Ladies Classic	–	B			The Blues Club	(England) Gainsborough	£2,060				(England) Beau Greaves	5–4	(Russia) Anastasia Dobromyslova
June 29	BDO Gold Cup	–	–			Magna Centre	(England) Rotherham	n/a	(Wales) Jim Williams	6–0	(England) Danny Ayres	(England) Beau Greaves	5–0	(England) Fallon Sherrock
June 30	BDO Champions Cup (T)	–	–			Magna Centre	(England) Rotherham	n/a	(England) Rochdale Borough	5–3	(Wales) Shamrock	(England) Eccleshill VC	3–2	(England) Bolton Ladies

=== July ===
Date	Tournament	BDO		WDF		Venue	City	Prize money	Men's			Women's		
Date	Tournament	M	W	M	W	Venue	City	Prize money	winner	score	runner-up	winner	score	runner-up
July 6	Apatin Open			3	3	Bowling Club MS Elkop	(Serbia) Apatin	€2,500	(Croatia) Boris Krčmar	bt.	(Serbia) Miroslav Ašćerić	(Hungary) Veronika Ihász	bt.	(Hungary) Adrienn Végső
July 11–13	WDF Europe Cup Youth (B/G)			–	–	Etap Altinel Hotel	(Turkey) Ankara	n/a	(England) Leighton Bennett	3–1	(Netherlands) Jurjen van der Velde	(Hungary) Tamara Kovács	4–3	(Netherlands) Lerena Rietbergen
July 12–13	WDF Europe Cup Youth (T)			–	–	Etap Altinel Hotel	(Turkey) Ankara	n/a	Ireland	9–8	Netherlands			
July 19	Mongolia Open			3	3	Grand Hill Hotel	(Mongolia) Ulaanbaatar	₮2,810,000	(Mongolia) Sh. Gan-Erdene	bt.	(Mongolia) Sh. Ganzorig	(Mongolia) Er. Dondov	bt.	(Mongolia) O. Purev
July 20	Mongolia Masters			3	3	Grand Hill Hotel	(Mongolia) Ulaanbaatar	₮2,710,000	(Mongolia) Ts. Baatarkhuyag	bt.	(Mongolia) A. Narangerel	(Mongolia) Er. Dondov	bt.	(Mongolia) S. Ganbat
July 20	BDO Youth Festival of Darts	–	–			Five Lakes Resort	(England) Tolleshunt Knights	£1,500	(Belgium) Brian Raman	4–1	(England) Jack Main			
July 27	Luxembourg Open	B	C			d'Coque	Luxembourg City	€7,250	(Netherlands) Martijn Kleermaker	6–2	(England) Leighton Bennett	(Netherlands) Aileen de Graaf	5–2	(England) Laura Turner
July 28	Luxembourg Masters	B	C			d'Coque	Luxembourg City	€7,250	(Netherlands) Richard Veenstra	6–5	(Netherlands) Luc Peters	(Netherlands) Aileen de Graaf	5–2	(England) Deta Hedman
July 28	Japan Open	B	B	2	2	Ota-Ku Sangyo Plaza PIO	(Japan) Tokyo	JP¥1,240,000	(Japan) Katsuya Aiba	bt.	(Japan) Yūichirō Ogawa	(Japan) Mayumi Ouchi	bt.	(South Korea) Kim Hyo-jin

=== August ===
Date	Tournament	BDO		WDF		Venue	City	Prize money	Men's			Women's		
Date	Tournament	M	W	M	W	Venue	City	Prize money	winner	score	runner-up	winner	score	runner-up
August 4	Pacific Masters	D	B			Rich River Golf Club	(Australia) Moama	AU$9,880	(Australia) Peter Machin	6–3	(Australia) Brad Thorp	(Japan) Mikuru Suzuki	5–3	(England) Lisa Ashton
August 7	New Zealand Open	D	C	1	2	Motueka Recreation Centre	(New Zealand) Motueka	NZ$7,230	(New Zealand) Mark McGrath	6–4	(New Zealand) AJ Te Kira	(New Zealand) Tina Osborne	5–3	(New Zealand) Shar Maru-Habib
August 10	Antwerp Open	B	B			Royal Yacht Club België	(Belgium) Antwerp	€8,120	(Wales) Wayne Warren	7–5	(Scotland) Gary Stone	(Netherlands) Astrid Trouwborst	6–3	(Netherlands) Sharon Prins
August 11	Belgium Open	B	B			Royal Yacht Club België	(Belgium) Antwerp	€8,120	(Wales) Nick Kenny	7–4	(Netherlands) Tonny Veenhof	(Netherlands) Aileen de Graaf	6–2	(England) Laura Turner
August 16	LDO Swedish Classic	–	C			Scandic Triangle Hotel	(Sweden) Malmö	SEK12,400				(England) Lisa Ashton	5–1	(Netherlands) Aileen de Graaf
August 17	Swedish Open	A	A	2	2	Scandic Triangle Hotel	(Sweden) Malmö	SEK117,400	(Sweden) Dennis Nilsson	6–1	(Wales) Wayne Warren	(Japan) Mikuru Suzuki	5–3	(England) Lisa Ashton
August 18	Gents Classic	D	–			Scandic Triangle Hotel	(Sweden) Malmö	SEK12,400	(Scotland) Gary Stone	5–2	(England) John Scott			
August 24	French Open	B	B	2	2	Salle Dany Boon	(France) Bray-Dunes	€7,800	(Wales) Nick Kenny	5–1	(England) Nick Fullwell	(England) Deta Hedman	5–2	(England) Lisa Ashton
August 25	French Classic	C	C	2	2	Salle Dany Boon	(France) Bray-Dunes	€5,210	(England) Adam Smith-Neale	5–0	(England) Dave Evans	(Netherlands) Aileen de Graaf	5–4	(England) Lisa Ashton
August 26	West Midlands Open	B	B			Allen's Sports Bar	(England) Tipton	£7,000	(England) Nigel Heydon	6–5	(England) Andy Hamilton	(England) Beau Greaves	6–1	(England) Kirsty Hutchinson
August 29–30	Shiraz Open			3	3	Shahid Dastgheib Sports Complex	(Iran) Shiraz	IRR225,000,000	(Iran) Javad Bayat	4–1	(Iran) Saeed Abbaszadeh	(Iran) Zahra Rajabi	bt.	(Iran) Fatima Karimi
August 31	Washington Area Open			3	3	Holiday Inn	(United States) Sterling	$2,770	(United States) Jim Widmayer	6–2	(United States) Sean Coohill	(Canada) Robin Curry	5–3	(United States) Marlise Kiel

=== September ===
Date	Tournament	BDO		WDF		Venue	City	Prize money	Men's			Women's		
Date	Tournament	M	W	M	W	Venue	City	Prize money	winner	score	runner-up	winner	score	runner-up
Aug 30–Sep. 1	BDO World Trophy	WT	WT			King George's Hall	(England) Blackburn	£47,000	(Wales) Jim Williams	8–6	(Netherlands) Richard Veenstra	(England) Lisa Ashton	6–2	(Russia) Anastasia Dobromyslova
September 7	Catalonia Open	C	C	2	3	Fábrica Llobet-Gurí	(Catalonia) Calella	€5,720	(Netherlands) Kevin Doets	6–3	(Catalonia) Carles Arola	(Netherlands) Sharon Prins	5–4	(Norway) Ramona Eriksen
September 8	FCD Anniversary Open	D	D	2	3	Fábrica Llobet-Gurí	(Catalonia) Calella	€2,760	(Catalonia) Carles Arola	6–3	(Netherlands) Kay Smeets	(Netherlands) Sharon Prins	5–3	(Netherlands) Aileen de Graaf
September 6	England Masters	C	B			Bunn Leisure; Holiday Centre	(England) Selsey	£6,100	(England) Scott Mitchell	5–2	(Netherlands) Richard Veenstra	(England) Lisa Ashton	5–2	(England) Beau Greaves
September 7	England Classic	A+	A			Bunn Leisure; Holiday Centre	(England) Selsey	£13,500	(Netherlands) Wesley Harms	5–2	(Wales) Nick Kenny	(Russia) Anastasia Dobromyslova	5–2	(England) Deta Hedman
September 8	England Matchplay	–	–			Bunn Leisure; Holiday Centre	(England) Selsey	n/a	(England) Scott Mitchell	5–4	(England) Daniel Day	(Russia) Anastasia Dobromyslova	5–3	(England) Lisa Ashton
September 14	Ukraine Open	D	D	3	3	Babushkin Sad Hotel	(Ukraine) Myla	€1,690	(Romania) Gabriel Pascaru	5–3	(Ukraine) Artem Usyk	(Ukraine) Vitalina Moiseenko	5–2	(Russia) Ksenia Klochek
September 15	Kyiv Masters	D	D	3	3	Babushkin Sad Hotel	(Ukraine) Myla	€1,690	(Ukraine) Oleksandr Mamyka	5–4	(Turkey) Alper Subaşı	(Russia) Ksenia Klochek	5–0	(Ukraine) Vitalina Moiseenko
September 14	Italmas Cup			3	3	Izhevsk SAA	(Russia) Izhevsk	n/a	(Russia) Roman Obukhov	bt.	(Russia) Yevgeniy Zhukov	(Russia) Elena Shulgina	bt.	(Russia) Liliya Moskotina
September 15	Udmurtia Open			3	3	Izhevsk SAA	(Russia) Izhevsk	n/a	(Russia) Aleksei Kadochnikov	bt.	(Russia) Aleksandr Shevel	(Russia) Elena Shulgina	bt.	(Russia) Ekaterina Cherkasova
September 15	Taranaki Open			3	3	The Devon Hotel	(New Zealand) New Plymouth	NZ$8,100	(New Zealand) Tahuna Irwin	bt.	(New Zealand) Haupai Puha	(Thailand) Hattaya Kanjanarungsima	bt.	(New Zealand) Tina Osborne
September 21	Witch City Open	C	C	3	3	Courtyard by Marriott	(United States) Nashua	US$5,425	(United States) Danny Baggish	6–3	(Canada) Dave Cameron	(United States) Stacey Pace	5–4	(United States) Marlise Kiel
September 21	Auckland Open	D	D	3	3	West City Darts Assoc.	(New Zealand) Ranui	NZ$3,750	(New Zealand) Mark Cleaver	6–5	(New Zealand) Mark McGrath	(New Zealand) Lorene Earnshaw	5–0	(New Zealand) Judy Fenton
September 21	BDO British Classic	A	B			Bridlington Spa	(England) Bridlington	£9,960	(Netherlands) Dennie Olde Kalter	6–4	(England) Dave Parletti	(England) Lisa Ashton	5–4	(England) Fallon Sherrock
September 22	BDO British Open	A+	B			Bridlington Spa	(England) Bridlington	£14,760	(Netherlands) Wesley Harms	6–5	(Wales) Michael Warburton	(England) Lisa Ashton	5–2	(England) Beau Greaves
September 22	North Queensland Classic	C	C			Townsville Darts Assoc.	(Australia) Annandale	AU$6,000	(Australia) Justin Thompson	6–1	(Australia) Jeremy Fagg	(Australia) Lorraine Burn	5–0	(Australia) Pam Burr
September 28	Belfry Open	C	B	2	3	Sporthal Tempelhof	(Belgium) Bruges	€8,140	(Belgium) Brian Raman	3–2	(France) Thibault Tricole	(England) Beau Greaves	2–0	(England) Fallon Sherrock
September 29	Bruges Open	A	A	2	3	Sporthal Tempelhof	(Belgium) Bruges	€11,680	(Wales) Nick Kenny	3–2	(England) Jason Heaver	(England) Beau Greaves	2–0	(England) Fallon Sherrock

=== October ===
Date	Tournament	BDO		WDF		Venue	City	Prize money	Men's			Women's		
Date	Tournament	M	W	M	W	Venue	City	Prize money	winner	score	runner-up	winner	score	runner-up
October 5	N. Ireland Open	B	C			Bellini's	(Northern Ireland) Newry	£6,325	(Northern Ireland) Kyle McKinstry	6–5	(England) Jason Heaver	(England) Kirsty Hutchinson	5–0	(Finland) Kaisu Rekinen
October 6	N. Ireland Matchplay	B	D			Bellini's	(Northern Ireland) Newry	£5,500	(Republic of Ireland) Keane Barry	6–2	(England) Paul Hogan	(England) Kirsty Hutchinson	5–2	(Northern Ireland) Denise Cassidy
October 6	Malaysian Open			1	3	Holiday Villa Hotel	(Malaysia) Subang Jaya	RM14,100	(Malaysia) Zulrizan Azdan	5–3	(Philippines) Lourence Ilagan	(Iran) Mozhgan Rahmani	bt.	(Philippines) Lovely-Mae Orbeta
October 6	Taiwan Open			2	3	NTSU	(Taiwan) Taoyuan	NT$83,000	(Taiwan) Liao Yeng Chou	bt.	(Japan) Masatsugu Irabu	(Philippines) Angelyn Detablan	bt.	(Taiwan) Zhang Xinyu
October 8–12	WDF World Cup (S)			M	M	Grand Hotel Italia	(Romania) Cluj-Napoca	n/a	(New Zealand) Darren Herewini	7–6	(Australia) Peter Machin	(Japan) Mikuru Suzuki	7–3	(England) Deta Hedman
October 9–12	WDF World Cup (T)			–	–	Grand Hotel Italia	(Romania) Cluj-Napoca	n/a	Wales	9–7	Hong Kong	England	9–4	Australia
October 12–13	Klondike Open	D	D	3	3	River Cree Resort & Casino	(Canada) Enoch	C$4,500	(Canada) Jim Edwards	bt.	(Canada) David Tarso	(Canada) Kim Bellay-Rousselle	bt.	(Canada) Alexandra Foulds
October 18–20	N. Cyprus Masters	B	–			Kaya Artemis Resort & Casino	(Northern Cyprus) Vokolida	€4,200	(England) Simon Stainton	5–3	(England) Steve Hine			
October 18–20	N. Cyprus Ladies Classic	–	B			Kaya Artemis Resort & Casino	(Northern Cyprus) Vokolida	€2,070				(England) Lisa Ashton	5–2	(England) Beau Greaves
October 19–20	N. Cyprus Open	A	A			Kaya Artemis Resort & Casino	(Northern Cyprus) Vokolida	€11,500	(England) Simon Stainton	6–5	(Republic of Ireland) Francis Carragher	(England) Beau Greaves	5–2	(England) Lisa Ashton
October 19–20	Australian Masters	D	D			Geelong Darts Club	(Australia) Geelong	AU$16,000	(Australia) Damon Heta	bt.	(Australia) Stuart Coburn	(Australia) Tori Kewish	bt.	(Australia) Chrissy Sheerin
October 19–20	Phoenix Open	D	D			Shédiac Multipurpose Centre	(Canada) Shediac	C$3,365	(Canada) Dave Cameron	bt.	(Canada) Robert Piercy	(Canada) Karrah Boutilier	bt.	(Canada) Danna Foster
October 25–26	Turkish Open			3	3	Göynük Atatürk Spor Salonu	(Turkey) Kemer	n/a	(Turkey) Emirhan Gündüz	bt.	(Turkey) Oğuzhan Kaya	(Iran) Zahra Rajabi	bt.	(Turkey) Beyza Durmaz
October 26	Alan King Memorial	D	D			Otago Darts Association	(New Zealand) Dunedin	NZ$4,000	(New Zealand) Darren Herewini	6–3	(New Zealand) Mike Day	(New Zealand) Patience Te Moananui	5–4	(New Zealand) Vani Bakani
October 23–27	World Masters	WM	WM	M	M	Circus Tavern	(England) Purfleet	£70,500	(Republic of Ireland) John O'Shea	6–4	(England) Scott Waites	(England) Lisa Ashton	5–4	(Russia) Anastasia Dobromyslova
October 27	Bob Jones Memorial	D	D			Astra Lounge, CFB Trenton	(Canada) Trenton	C$4,500	(Canada) Dave Cameron	bt.	(Canada) Keifer Durham	(Canada) Maria Mason	bt.	(Canada) Latressa Skrzyniak
October 27–28	Turkish Masters			3	3	Göynük Atatürk Spor Salonu	(Turkey) Kemer	n/a	(Iran) Hossein Arabi	bt.	(Turkey) Özkan Arslan	(Turkey) Merve Erden	bt.	(Iran) Mahshad Avazzadeh

=== November ===
Date	Tournament	BDO		WDF		Venue	City	Prize money	Men's			Women's		
Date	Tournament	M	W	M	W	Venue	City	Prize money	winner	score	runner-up	winner	score	runner-up
November 2	Colorado Open	D	C	2	2	DoubleTree by Hilton	(United States) Denver	$4,120	(United States) Bruce Robbins	6–5	(United States) Larry Butler	(United States) Paula Murphy	4–2	(United States) Stacey Pace
November 2	Hungarian Classic	C	C	2	3	Hotel Hungária City Center	(Hungary) Budapest	HUF1,334,000	(Hungary) János Végső	bt.	(Cyprus) Wayne Halliwell	(England) Deta Hedman	bt.	(Netherlands) Aileen de Graaf
November 3	Hungarian Masters	C	C	2	3	Hotel Hungária City Center	(Hungary) Budapest	HUF1,334,000	(Romania) Gabriel Pascaru	bt.	(Slovenia) Leon Mertük	(England) Deta Hedman	bt.	(Hungary) Veronika Ihász
November 9	Seacoast Open	C	C			DoubleTree by Hilton	(United States) Andover	$5,170	(Canada) Jeff Smith	6–4	(United States) Danny Baggish	(United States) Cali West	4–3	(Canada) Joanne Luke
November 9	Mill Rythe Darts Festival	–	–			Mill Rythe	(England) Hayling Island	£3,340	(England) Jason Askew	5–2	(England) Daniel Day	(England) Sarah Chick	4–1	(England) Sophie Self
November 9	Irish Open	A+	A+			Gleneagle Hotel	(Republic of Ireland) Killarney	€18,500	(Wales) Michael Warburton	7–6	(Republic of Ireland) Keane Barry	(England) Fallon Sherrock	6–2	(England) Kirsty Hutchinson
November 10	HP Roofing Open	C	C			Gleneagle Hotel	(Republic of Ireland) Killarney	€5,800	(Wales) Michael Warburton	7–4	(Scotland) Ryan Hogarth	(England) Maria O'Brien	6–5	(England) Deta Hedman
November 10	Ted Clements Memorial	D	D			Levin Cosmopolitan Club	(New Zealand) Levin	NZ$3,000	(New Zealand) Darren Herewini	6–5	(New Zealand) Mark McGrath	(New Zealand) Desi Mercer	5–3	(New Zealand) Taylor-Marsh Kahaki
November 10	Hong Kong Open			2	3	KITEC	Hong Kong	HK$39,000	Cancelled due to 2019–20 Hong Kong protests					
November 9–10	Great Lakes Open	C	C			Club Forster	(Australia) Forster	AU$4,380	(Australia) Kerry Allen	bt.	(Australia) Manny Kato	(Australia) Tori Kewish	bt.	(Australia) Faith Kainuku
November 16	Czech Open	A	A	M	1	Hotel Pyramida	(Czech Republic) Prague	CZK300,200	(Scotland) Ross Montgomery	6–5	(Republic of Ireland) Keane Barry	(England) Lisa Ashton	5–1	(England) Lorraine Winstanley
November 17	Korean Open			3	3	PDK Darts Stadium	(South Korea) Seoul	KRW2,700,000	(South Korea) Cho Gwang-hee	4–3	(South Korea) Seo Byung-su	(South Korea) Choi Hye-jin	4–1	(South Korea) Kim Yoon-ji
November 20–21	Malta Open	B	B	1	3	Monte Kristo Estates	(Malta) Luqa	€8,100	(England) Joe Davis	6–4	(France) Thibault Tricole	(England) Jo Locke	4–2	(England) Paula Jacklin
November 23	Latvia Open	C	C	2	3	Bellevue Park Hotel	(Latvia) Riga	€4,800	(Belarus) Andrey Pontus	6–3	(Russia) Aleksei Kadochnikov	(Finland) Kirsi Viinikainen	5–3	(Sweden) Heléne Sundelin
November 23	Italian Grand Masters	A	B	1	3	Grand Hotel Bologna	(Italy) Pieve di Cento	€11,500	(Scotland) Ross Montgomery	6–3	(Netherlands) Wesley Harms	(England) Laura Turner	5–3	(Netherlands) Aileen de Graaf
November 24	Italian Open	C	C	1	3	Grand Hotel Bologna	(Italy) Pieve di Cento	€5,470	(England) Tony Martin	6–2	(France) Thibault Tricole	(Netherlands) Aileen de Graaf	5–3	(England) Laura Turner
November 30	Russian Open	D	D	3	3	Hotel Park Krestovskiy	(Russia) Saint Petersburg	RUB231,000	(Romania) Gabriel Pascaru	bt.	(Czech Republic) Jiří Brejcha	(Russia) Elena Shulgina	bt.	(Russia) Ksenia Klochek

=== December ===
Date	Tournament	BDO		WDF		Venue	City	Prize money	Men's			Women's		
Date	Tournament	M	W	M	W	Venue	City	Prize money	winner	score	runner-up	winner	score	runner-up
December 1	Saint Petersburg Open	D	D	3	3	Hotel Park Krestovskiy	(Russia) Saint Petersburg	RUB184,500	(Russia) Boris Koltsov	bt.	(Romania) Gabriel Pascaru	(Russia) Elena Shulgina	bt.	(Russia) Alisa Burykina

== Statistical information ==
The players/nations are sorted by:

1. Total number of titles;
2. Cumulated importance of those titles;
3. Alphabetical order (by family names for players).
- ø symbol stands for a both BDO and WDF sanctioned tournament, meaning that only a 1 title is accounted. When a BDO-WDF sanctioned tournament, highest category priority.

=== Key ===
Tournament categories
BDO	WDF
Special Event	
A+/A	M
B	1
C	2
D	3

=== Titles won by player (men's) ===
Total	Player	Category							
Total	Player	A+/A	M	B	1	C	2	D	3
7	Wesley Harms (NED)	● ø ø ● ●		●	ø		● ø		
5	Darren Herewini (NZL)		●					● ø ● ●	ø
4	Martijn Kleermaker (NED)	●		● ● ●					
4	Jeff Smith (CAN)					ø ●	ø	● ●	
3	Richard Veenstra (NED)	ø	ø	● ●					
3	Nick Kenny (WAL)	ø			● ø		ø ø		
3	Leonard Gates (USA)					●		● ø	ø
3	Gabriel Pascaru (ROM)					ø	ø	ø ø	ø ø
3	Dave Cameron (CAN)							● ● ●	
3	Tahuna Irwin (NZL)							ø ø	ø ø ●
2	Ross Montgomery (SCO)	ø ø	ø		ø				
2	Dave Parletti (ENG)	●		ø	ø				
2	Brian Raman (BEL)	ø			ø	ø	ø		
2	Simon Stainton (ENG)	●			●				
2	Michael Warburton (WAL)	●				●			
2	Tony Martin (ENG)			ø	ø	ø	ø		
2	Danny Baggish (USA)					ø		●	ø
2	Peter Machin (AUS)					●		●	
2	Justin Thompson (AUS)					●		●	
2	Thibault Tricole (FRA)					● ø			ø
2	John Scott (ENG)							ø ø	ø ø
1	John O'Shea (IRE)	ø	ø						
1	Dennis Nilsson (SWE)	ø					ø		
1	Dennie Olde Kalter (NED)	●							
1	Mario Vandenbogaerde (BEL)	ø	ø						
1	Scott Waites (ENG)	●							
1	Jim Williams (WAL)	●							
1	Katsuya Aiba (JPN)			ø			ø		
1	Keane Barry (IRE)				●				
1	Joe Davis (ENG)			ø	ø				
1	Brian Dawson (ENG)			ø	ø				
1	Nigel Heydon (ENG)				●				
1	Thomas Junghans (SUI)			ø			ø		
1	Kyle McKinstry (NIR)				●				
1	Aaron Morrison (AUS)				●				
1	Wayne Warren (WAL)				●				
1	Zulrizan Azdan (MYS)				●				
1	John Michael (GRE)				ø	ø			
1	Kerry Allen (AUS)					●			
1	Kevin Doets (NED)					ø	ø		
1	Nick Fullwell (ENG)					●			
1	Toon Greebe (NED)					ø	ø		
1	Scott Mitchell (ENG)					●			
1	Robbie Phillips (USA)					ø	ø		
1	David Platt (AUS)					●			
1	Andrey Pontus (BLR)					ø	ø		
1	Adam Rowe (AUS)					●			
1	Adam Smith-Neale (ENG)					ø	ø		
1	Alan Soutar (SCO)					ø			ø
1	János Végső (HUN)					ø	ø		
1	Carles Arola (CAT)						ø	ø	
1	Mark Blandford (WAL)						ø	ø	
1	Liao Yeng Chou (TAI)						●		
1	Bruce Robbins (USA)						ø	ø	
1	Meena Sundram (MYS)						●		
1	Sven Verdonck (BEL)						ø	ø	
1	Josh Wood (CAN)						ø	ø	
1	Martin Barratt (ENG)							ø	ø
1	Matt Campbell (USA)							●	
1	Joe Chaney (USA)							ø	ø
1	Mark Cleaver (NZL)							ø	ø
1	Bill Crawford (CAN)							ø	ø
1	Shawn Currie (CAN)							●	
1	Jim Edwards (CAN)							ø	ø
1	Damon Heta (AUS)							●	
1	Patrick Kithi (USA)							●	
1	Boris Koltsov (RUS)							ø	ø
1	Oleksandr Mamyka (UKR)							ø	ø
1	Gordon Mathers (AUS)							●	
1	John Norman Jnr (CAN)							●	
1	Ben Robb (NZL)							●	
1	Jeffrey Sparidaans (NED)							●	
1	Gary Stone (SCO)							●	
1	Stefano Tomassetti (ITA)							ø	ø
1	Graham Usher (ENG)							●	
1	Dennis Watt (SCO)							ø	ø
1	Alain Abiabi (PHI)								●
1	Hossein Arabi (IRI)								●
1	Javad Bayat (IRI)								●
1	Emirhan Gündüz (TUR)								●
1	Cho Gwang-hee (KOR)								●
1	Aleksei Kadochnikov (RUS)								●
1	Boris Krčmar (CRO)								●
1	Ermos Korradou (CYP)								●
1	Roman Obukhov (RUS)								●
1	Dyson Parody (GIB)								●
1	Aaron Rahlfs (GER)								●
1	Ross Snook (CAN)								●
1	Alper Subaşı (TUR)								●
1	Jim Widmayer (USA)								●
1	Daniel Zygla (GER)								●

=== Titles won by nation (men's) ===
Total	Nation	Category							
Total	Nation	A+/A	M	B	1	C	2	D	3
17	England (ENG)	● ● ●		ø ø ø ● ● ø	ø ø ø ø	● ø ● ø	ø ø	ø ø ø ●	ø ø ø
13	Netherlands (NED)	ø ● ø ø ● ●	ø	● ● ● ● ● ●	ø	ø ø	● ø ø ø	●	
13	Canada (CAN)				ø ●		ø ø	ø ● ● ● ø ● ● ø ● ●	● ø ø
10	United States (USA)					ø ●	ø ø	● ● ø ø ● ● ø	ø ø ●
9	Australia (AUS)			●		● ● ● ●		● ● ● ●	
8	Wales (WAL)	● ø ●		● ● ø		●	ø ø ø	ø	
8	New Zealand (NZL)		●					● ● ø ø ø ● ●	ø ø ø
5	Scotland (SCO)	ø ø	ø		ø	ø		ø ●	ø ø
4	Belgium (BEL)	ø ø	ø		ø	ø	øø	ø	
2	Ireland (IRE)	ø	ø	●					
2	Malaysia (MYS)				●		●		
2	France (FRA)					● ø			ø
2	Romania (ROM)					ø	ø	ø	ø
2	Germany (GER)								● ●
2	Iran (IRI)								● ●
2	Turkey (TUR)								● ●
1	Sweden (SWE)	ø					ø		
1	Japan (JPN)			ø			ø		
1	Northern Ireland (NIR)			●					
1	Switzerland (SUI)			ø			ø		
1	Greece (GRE)				ø	ø			
1	Belarus (BLR)					ø	ø		
1	Hungary (HUN)					ø	ø		
1	Catalonia (CAT)						ø	ø	
1	Taiwan (TAI)						●		
1	Italy (ITA)							ø	ø
1	Russia (RUS)							ø	ø
1	Croatia (CRO)								●
1	Cyprus (CYP)								●
1	Gibraltar (GIB)								●
1	Philippines (PHI)								●
1	South Korea (KOR)								●

=== Titles won by player (women's) ===
Total	Player	Category							
Total	Player	A+/A	M	B	1	C	2	D	3
9	Beau Greaves (ENG)	● ● ø ●		● ● ● ● ø					ø ø
9	Lisa Ashton (ENG)	ø ø	ø	● ● ● ● ●	ø	●	●		
7	Aileen de Graaf (NED)			ø ●	ø	ø ● ● ø ø	ø ø		ø
6	Deta Hedman (ENG)			● ø ø		ø ø	ø ø	ø	ø ø ø
6	Tori Kewish (AUS)			●		● ● ●		● ●	
4	Mikuru Suzuki (JPN)	ø ø	ø ●	●			ø		
4	Paula Jacklin (ENG)			ø		● ø			● ø ø
4	Cali West (USA)					● ● ●		ø	ø
4	Elena Shulgina (RUS)							ø ø	ø ø ● ●
3	Anastasia Dobromyslova (RUS)	●		ø				●	ø
3	Kirsty Hutchinson (ENG)			●		●		●	
3	Kirsi Viinikainen (FIN)					ø		ø ø	ø ø
3	Desi Mercer (NZL)							● ● ●	
2	Maria O'Brien (ENG)	ø				●			ø
2	Fallon Sherrock (ENG)	●				ø			ø
2	Laura Turner (ENG)	●		ø					ø
2	Stacey Pace (USA)					● ø			ø
2	Paula Murphy (USA)					ø	ø	ø	ø
2	Sharon Prins (NED)					ø		ø	ø ø
2	Hayley Crowley (CAN)							● ●	
2	Wendy Harper (NZL)							● ø	ø
2	Kaisu Rekinen (FIN)							ø ø	ø ø
2	Zahra Rajabi (IRI)								● ●
1	Lorraine Winstanley (ENG)	●							
1	Dianne Gobeil (CAN)			ø			ø		
1	Corrine Hammond (AUS)			ø			ø		
1	Jo Locke (ENG)			ø					ø
1	Mayumi Ouchi (JPN)			ø			ø		
1	Astrid Trouwborst (NED)			●					
1	Lorraine Burn (AUS)					●			
1	Donna Gleed (NIR)					●			
1	Joanne Hadley (AUS)					●			
1	Maggie Holyk (CAN)					ø			ø
1	Sandy Hudson (USA)					ø	ø		
1	Carolyn Mars (USA)					●			
1	Karolina Podgórska (POL)					ø	ø		
1	Fie Skinnes (DEN)					ø	ø		
1	Kim Bellay-Rousselle (CAN)							ø	ø
1	Karrah Boutilier (CAN)							●	
1	Andreea Brad (ROM)							ø	ø
1	Lorene Earnshaw (NZL)							ø	ø
1	Judy Fenton (NZL)							ø	ø
1	Kris Grimal (USA)							●	
1	Ksenia Klochek (RUS)							ø	ø
1	Kristin Kovitch (CAN)							●	
1	Joanne Luke (CAN)							ø	ø
1	Ingibjörg Magnúsdóttir (ISL)							ø	ø
1	Maria Mason (CAN)							●	
1	Vitalina Moiseenko (UKR)							ø	ø
1	Tina Osborne (NZL)							ø	ø
1	Cindy Pardy (CAN)							ø	ø
1	Renee Ripol (USA)							●	
1	Patience Te Moananui (NZL)							●	
1	Irina Armstrong (GER)								●
1	Robin Curry (CAN)								●
1	Angelyn Detablan (PHI)								●
1	Emine Dursun (TUR)								●
1	Merve Erden (TUR)								●
1	Choi Hye-jin (KOR)								●
1	Veronika Ihász (HUN)								●
1	Hattaya Kanjanarungsima (THA)								●
1	Nur Sazleena Muliyono (MYS)								●
1	Mozhgan Rahmani (IRI)								●
1	Marwa Shannon (EGY)								●
1	Darlene Van Sleeuwen (CAN)								●
1	Lisa Zollikofer (GER)								●

=== Titles won by nation (women's) ===
Total	Nation	Category							
Total	Nation	A+/A	M	B	1	C	2	D	3
37	England (ENG)	● ø ● ● ● ø ● ø ● ø	ø	● ● ● ø ● ø ● ● ø ● ● ø ● ø ø	ø	● ø ø ● ● ø ø ●	● ø ø	ø ●	ø ● ø ø ø ø ø ø ø ø ø ø
12	Canada (CAN)			ø		ø	ø	ø ø ● ● ● ø ● ●	ø ø ● ø ● ø
11	United States (USA)					ø ● ● ● ● ø ●	ø ø	ø ø ● ●	ø ø
10	Netherlands (NED)			ø ● ●	ø	ø ● ● ø ø ø	ø ø	ø	ø ø ø
8	Australia (AUS)			ø ●		● ● ● ●	ø	● ●	
8	New Zealand (NZL)							● ● ø ● ø ø ● ●	ø ø ø
5	Japan (JPN)	ø ø	ø ●	ø ●			ø ø		
5	Russia (RUS)	●		ø				● ø ø	ø ø ø
5	Finland (FIN)					ø		ø ø ø ø	ø ø ø ø
3	Iran (IRI)								● ● ●
2	Germany (GER)								● ●
2	Turkey (TUR)								● ●
1	Denmark (DEN)					ø	ø		
1	Northern Ireland (NIR)					●			
1	Poland (POL)					ø	ø		
1	Iceland (ISL)							ø	ø
1	Romania (ROM)							ø	ø
1	Egypt (EGY)								●
1	Hungary (HUN)								●
1	Malaysia (MYS)								●
1	Philippines (PHI)								●
1	South Korea (KOR)								●

== Rankings ==
=== BDO ===
Updated before 2020 BDO World Professional Championship.

==== Men's ====
Rank	Player	Points
1	(Netherlands) Wesley Harms	415
2	(Wales) Jim Williams	368
3	(Netherlands) Richard Veenstra	353
4	(England) Dave Parletti	311
5	(Wales) Wayne Warren	310
6	(Wales) Nick Kenny	301
7	(Netherlands) Martijn Kleermaker	298
8	(Netherlands) Willem Mandigers	275
9	(England) Scott Mitchell	268
10	(England) Adam Smith-Neale	233

==== Women's ====
Rank	Player	Points
1	(England) Lisa Ashton	433
2	(Japan) Mikuru Suzuki	383
3	(Netherlands) Aileen de Graaf	370
4	(England) Fallon Sherrock	368
5	(England) Deta Hedman	356
6	(England) Beau Greaves	355
7	(Russia) Anastasia Dobromyslova	339
8	(England) Lorraine Winstanley	337
9	(England) Laura Turner	326
10	(England) Maria O'Brien	280

=== WDF ===
Updated December 2019.

==== Men's ====
Rank	Player	Points
1	(Wales) Nick Kenny	685
2	(Netherlands) Wesley Harms	668
3	(New Zealand) Darren Herewini	612
4	(France) Thibault Tricole	553
5	(Belgium) Mario Vandenbogaerde	495
6	(Scotland) Ross Montgomery	464
7	(Netherlands) Richard Veenstra	449
8	(Belgium) Brian Raman	440
9	(England) John Scott	437
10	(England) Tony Martin	426

==== Women's ====
Rank	Player	Points
1	(England) Lisa Ashton	957
2	(Netherlands) Aileen de Graaf	925
3	(England) Deta Hedman	882
4	(England) Fallon Sherrock	762
5	(England) Paula Jacklin	642
6	(Japan) Mikuru Suzuki	623
7	(England) Laura Turner	535
8	(Russia) Anastasia Dobromyslova	513
9	(New Zealand) Tina Osborne	405
10	(Australia) Corrine Hammond	394
