= Emine Dursun =

Turkish bocce bowls and darts player (born 2001)

Personal information
- Born: 4 January 2001 (age 25) Turkey

Sport
- Sport: Darts
- Laterality: Right-handed
Medal record
Women's Darts, Bocce
Representing Turkey
Gold medal – first place	2019 Kemer	Singles
WDF Mediterranean Cup (Darts)
Gold medal – first place	2019 Salou	Singles
Darts Tourbanebts
Silver medal – second place	202 Esbjerg	Darts singles
EDU European Darts Championship
Silver medal – second place	2017 Caorle	Soft-tip Darts
European Bocce Championships
Gold medal – first place	2024 Toroslar	Volo Doubles tradional

Emine Dursun (born 4 January 2001) is a Turkish lawn bowler, bocce volo, and professional darts player.

== Sport career ==
=== Lawn bowls ===
Dursun played lawn bowls with three other Turkish female teammates at the 2016 World Outdoor Bowls Championship – Women's fours in Christchurch, New Zealand without success.

=== Bocce ===
She won the gold medal in the bocce volo doubles traditional event with her teammate Buket Öztürk at the 2024 European Bocce Women & Mix Championship in Toroslar, Mersin, Turkey.

=== Darts ===
Dursun started playing darts when she was 5–6 years old, impressed by her father Fikret Dursun, a former national darts team coach and Turkish Federation's chairman of the central referee board, and her brother, a national athlete. She felt great enthusiasm for this sport while they were training. She was constantly getting in between them and trying shots.

She became first time champion in the youth category at the 2012 Turkish Cadets and Juniors Darts Championships, which was her first competition. In the seniors category, she ranked third, and was selected so to the national team. Due to her young age, her application for participation at international competitions was denied. In 2017, she came second in Europe for the first time in the 2017 soft-tip Electronic Darts EDU European Darts Championship in Caorle, Italy. The same year, she won the champions title at the Steel-tip Darts Championships as the first Turkish girl. She won the gold medal in girls' singles at the 2017 WDF European Youth Cup, and at the 2017 WDF Mediterranean Open tournament. In 2019, she captured the gold medal in the women's singles at the Mediterranean Darts Open tournament in Kemer, Antalya, Turkey in April, and another gold at the WDF Mediterranean Cup in Salou, Spain in May, became silver medalist at the EDU European Darts Championships, and took a bronze medal at the WDF World Junior Cup.

She took the silver medal in the singles event at the 2025 Danish Darts Open in Esbjerg losing to Lorraine Hyde in the final 5–4. In 2025, she became the first Turkish woman to compete at the WDF World Darts Championship.

== Personal life ==
Emine Dursun was born on 4 January 2001.

She is a student at Bayburt University.
