= Malaysia Open =

Malaysian Open can refer to:

- Badminton : Malaysia Open (badminton)
- Badminton : Malaysia Masters
- Darts : Malaysian Open (darts)
- Golf : Malaysian Open (golf)
- Squash : Malaysian Open Squash Championships
- Tennis (men) : Malaysian Open, Kuala Lumpur (tennis)
- Tennis (women) : Malaysian Open (tennis)
