= 2019 WDF World Cup =

WDF World Cup

Tournament information
- Dates: 8–12 October 2019
- Venue: Grand Hotel Italia
- Location: Cluj-Napoca
- Country: Romania
- Organisation(s): WDF
- Format: Legs

Champion(s)
- Singles; Darren Herewini (men's); Mikuru Suzuki (women's); Keelan Kay (boys'); Beau Greaves (girls'); Pairs (Canada) David Cameron & Jeff Smith (men's) (Japan) Mikuru Suzuki & Mayumi Ouchi (women's); Brad Phillips & Keelan Kay (boys'); Beau Greaves & Shannon Reeves (girls') (Czech Republic) Tomas Houdek & Anna Votavova (youth's mixed); Team; Wales (men's); England (women's); Overall; Netherlands (men's overall); England (women's overall); England (youth overall)

The 2019 WDF World Cup was the 19th edition of the WDF World Cup darts tournament, organised by the World Darts Federation. It was held in Cluj-Napoca, Romania from October 8 to 12.

== Entered teams ==
56 countries/associations entered a team in the event. Not all teams took part in all events (for example, Switzerland did not participate in the youth events).

Australia
Austria
Brazil
Bulgaria
Canada
Catalonia
Croatia
Cyprus
Czech Republic
Denmark
Egypt
England
Estonia
Ethiopia
Finland
France
Germany
Gibraltar
Greece
Hong Kong
Hungary
Iceland
India
Iran
Ireland
Isle of Man
Italy
Japan
Jersey
Latvia
Lithuania
Luxembourg
Mongolia
Netherlands
New Zealand
Northern Ireland
Norway
Pakistan
Romania
Russia
Scotland
Serbia
Singapore
Slovakia
Slovenia
South Africa
South Korea
Spain
Sweden
Switzerland
Trinidad and Tobago
Turkey
Turks and Caicos Islands
Ukraine
United States
Wales

== Men's singles ==
Darren Herewini from New Zealand became the 2019 WDF World Cup champion.

Machin performed strongly and beat Daniel Day, Johan Engström and Nick Kenny, among others. This year had many nationalities among the last sixteen, including three Swedes. Peter Machin was the third Australian to reach the final of the men's WDF World Cup singles, but after Peter Hinkley in 1997 and Raymond Smith in 2017, he too had to settle for silver.

Fifth round (best of 7 legs)
David Cameron 80.20	4
Alan Soutar 82.60	3
Johan Engström 82.40	4
Hakon Helling 70.40	1
Peter Machin 81.90	4
Alan Ljubic 79.40	1
Daniel Day 76.10	4
Brent Robinson 72.40	3
Andreas Harrysson 85.10	4
Nigel Heydon 84.30	2
Stefan Bellmont 89.20	4
Kai Fan Leung 80.60	1
Nick Kenny 88.10	4
József Rucska 72.80	1
Joe Chaney 77.60	4
Michael Unterbuchner 74.90	2
Jeff Smith 85.90	4
Justin Thompson 83.80	0
Aaron Hardy 90.70	4
Miroslav Petrov 86.90	1
Antony Lopez 76.30	4
Edwin Torbjörnsson 69.70	3
Martijn Kleermaker 89.20	4
Scott Mitchell 92.40	3
Mitchell Clegg 76.10	4
Oleksandr Mamyka 64.00	0
Oskar Lukasiak 73.80	4
Shawn Hogan 76.20	3
Darren Herewini 89.20	4
Mindaugas Barauskas 80.10	3
Chris Landman 79.80	4
Jim Widmayer 75.80	1

Sixth round (best of 7 legs)
David Cameron 100.00	3
Johan Engström 88.30	4
Peter Machin 93.80	4
Daniel Day 87.60	2
Andreas Harrysson 86.30	4
Stefan Bellmont 80.90	2
Nick Kenny 78.30	4
Joe Chaney 82.20	1
Jeff Smith 82.40	4
Aaron Hardy 78.00	0
Antony Lopez 77.90	1
Martijn Kleermaker 82.40	4
Mitchell Clegg 80.50	4
Oskar Lukasiak 82.10	3
Darren Herewini 84.10	4
Chris Landman 86.00	3

Quarter-finals (best of 9 legs)
Johan Engström 87.50	4
Peter Machin 83.50	5
Andreas Harrysson 84.50	3
Nick Kenny 88.60	5
Jeff Smith 83.00	3
Martijn Kleermaker 91.00	5
Mitchell Clegg 90.50	3
Darren Herewini 98.50	5

Semi-finals (best of 11 legs)
Peter Machin 87.30	6
Nick Kenny 85.60	3
Martijn Kleermaker 86.30	5
Darren Herewini 85.50	6

Final (best of 13 legs)
Peter Machin 86.60	6
Darren Herewini 87.70	7

== Women's singles ==
Fifth round (best of 7 legs)
Vicky Pruim 73.20	4
Kayleigh O'Neill 62.40	2
Lorraine Winstanley 66.20	4
Henriette Honore 62.90	1
Chris Savvery 69.90	4
Anne Willkomm 66.20	0
Cali West 62.70	4
Kaisu Rekinen 65.30	2
Fiona Gaylor 74.20	4
Stacey Pace 59.90	0
Maud Jansson 56.60	4
Natalie Carter 56.30	3
Mikuru Suzuki 72.40	4
Merve Erden 55.40	0
Maria O'Brien 67.50	4
Veronika Ihász 67.70	2
Cathy Leung 57.00	4
Maria Poulidou 54.20	2
Wendy Harper 63.20	4
Lena Zollikofer 57.90	1
Rachna David 72.40	4
Naomi Saito 58.40	0
Tori Kewish 72.40	4
Anita van der Velde 53.30	0
Robyn Byrne 78.10	4
Jeannette Stoop 73.90	1
Mayumi Ouchi 69.90	4
Robin Curry 62.20	0
Veronica Simonsen 59.30	4
Dianne Gobeil 63.00	2
Deta Hedman 74.30	4
Rhian O'Sullivan 74.80	3

Sixth round (best of 7 legs)
Vicky Pruim 72.70	4
Lorraine Winstanley 70.90	3
Chris Savvery 61.90	4
Cali West 61.80	3
Fiona Gaylor 57.40	3
Maud Jansson 57.20	4
Mikuru Suzuki 75.50	4
Maria O'Brien 66.40	1
Cathy Leung 66.80	4
Wendy Harper 59.80	2
Rachna David 72.40	0
Tori Kewish 80.20	4
Robyn Byrne 61.40	2
Mayumi Ouchi 63.40	4
Veronica Simonsen 58.90	1
Deta Hedman 72.20	4

Quarter-finals (best of 9 legs)
Vicky Pruim 67.60	5
Chris Savvery 66.20	4
Maud Jansson 60.80	2
Mikuru Suzuki 75.90	5
Cathy Leung 68.50	3
Tori Kewish 73.30	5
Mayumi Ouchi 62.40	1
Deta Hedman 76.40	5

Semi-finals (best of 11 legs)
Vicky Pruim 70.70	0
Mikuru Suzuki 78.40	6
Tori Kewish 72.30	2
Deta Hedman 76.50	6

Final (best of 13 legs)
Mikuru Suzuki 70.60	7
Deta Hedman 70.50	3

== Boys' Singles ==
1/8 finals (best of 7 legs)
Dominik Grüllich 65.30	4
Donovan Pilon 57.30	0
Keelan Kay 73.50	4
Peter Gevai 69.50	3
Ozcan Karagoz 68.90	4
Stefan Vermaak 71.80	3
Shusaku Nakamura 71.00	4
Brad Phillips 77.20	3
Tomáš Houdek 81.20	4
Sebastian Bech 63.80	0
Mehrdad Seyfi 80.10	4
Barnabas Nagy 73.20	2
Jurjen van der Velde 78.70	4
Dylan Slevin 73.40	1
Nathan Girvan 88.40	4
Marcel Steinacher 73.90	0

Quarter-finals (best of 7 legs)
Dominik Grüllich 80.60	2
Keelan Kay 83.90	4
Ozcan Karagoz 58.20	3
Shusaku Nakamura 60.90	4
Tomáš Houdek 78.10	2
Mehrdad Seyfi 77.70	4
Jurjen van der Velde 78.40	4
Nathan Girvan 76.80	2

Semi-finals (best of 9 legs)
Keelan Kay 83.90	5
Shusaku Nakamura 78.80	1
Mehrdad Seyfi 80.30	5
Jurjen van der Velde 72.80	3

Final (best of 11 legs)
Keelan Kay 85.50	6
Mehrdad Seyfi 68.50	3

== Girls' Singles ==
1/8 finals (best of 7 legs)
Abbey Morrison 62.60	4
Fatemeh-Safi Shalamzari 52.80	1
Beau Greaves 82.40	4
Wibke Riemann 65.90	0
Lerena Rietbergen 60.70	4
Denisa Feklova 53.90	0
Ksenia Klochek 60.00	4
Chloe O'Brien 62.70	3
Suzan Atas 50.70	4
Shannon Reeves 55.20	3
Hayley Crowley 56.30	4
Fatemeh Karimi 57.10	2
Sophie McKinlay 63.90	4
Melisa Mukaddes Dogan 58.50	3
Katie Sheldon 62.00	4
Emily Alford 55.20	0

Quarter-finals (best of 7 legs)
Abbey Morrison 57.80	2
Beau Greaves 64.70	4
Lerena Rietbergen 61.20	2
Ksenia Klochek 60.40	4
Suzan Atas 51.10	2
Hayley Crowley 53.00	4
Sophie McKinlay 68.60	1
Katie Sheldon 76.60	4

Semi-finals (best of 9 legs)
Beau Greaves 68.60	5
Ksenia Klochek 66.50	3
Hayley Crowley 51.10	1
Katie Sheldon 63.90	5

Final (best of 11 legs)
Beau Greaves 74.80	6
Katie Sheldon 74.00	4
