= Cathy Leung =

Hong Kongese darts player

Cathy Leung (梁曉茵)
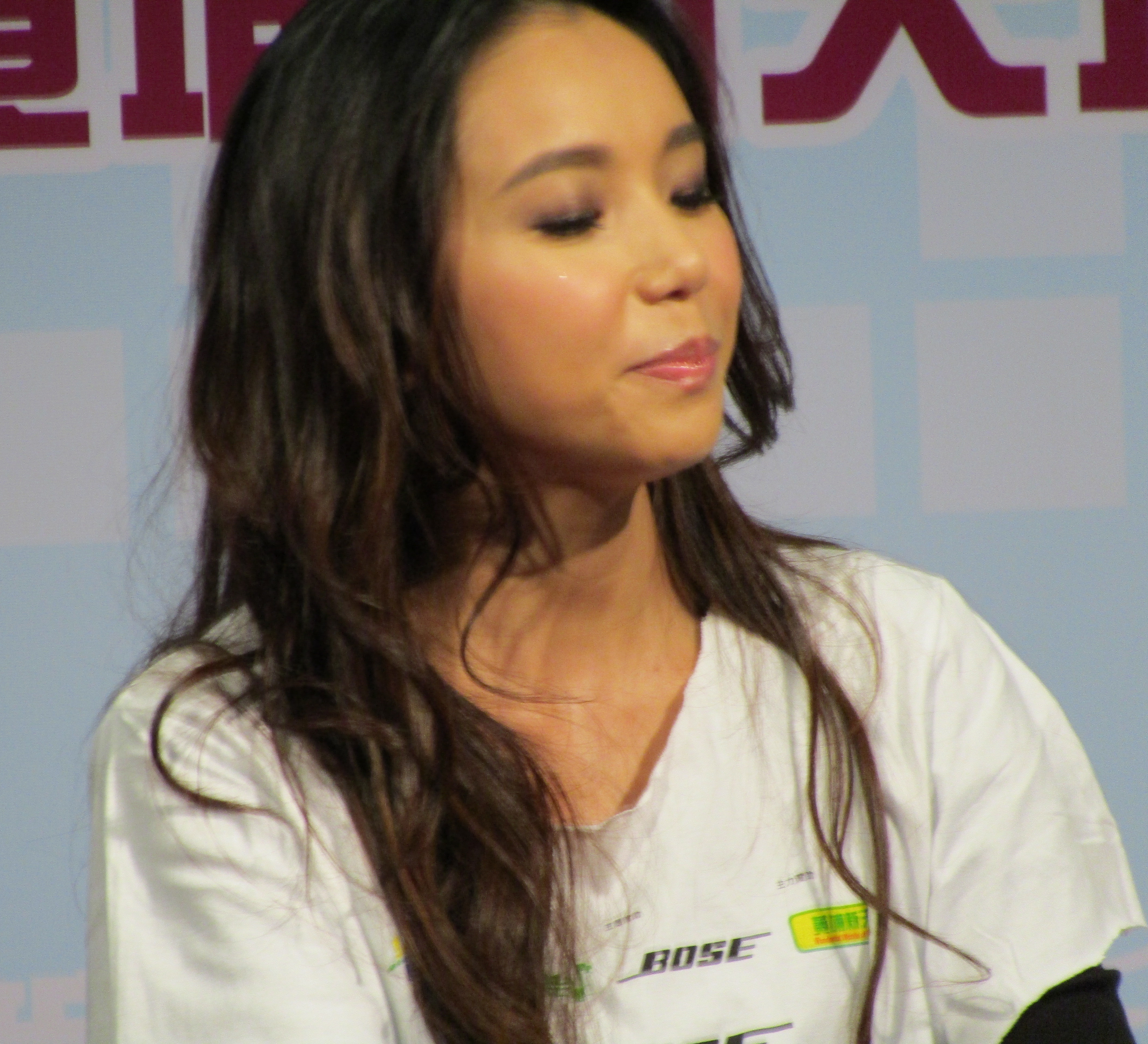
- Cathy Leung in 2005

Personal information
- Full name: Cathleen Yu-Yan Leung
- Born: 9 July 1985 (age 41) British Hong Kong
- Home town: Hong Kong

Sport
- Sport: Darts
- Playing since: 2012
- Darts: Target 20g
- Laterality: Right-handed

Organisation (see split in darts)
- BDO: 2017–2020
- WDF: 2017–
- Current world ranking: (WDF W) NR (17 August 2026)

Other tournament wins
- Years
Dartslive World Cup (team)	2016, 2019

Cathleen Yu-Yan Leung (梁曉茵; born 9 July 1985) is a Hong Kongese professional darts player who mainly plays at the soft-tip darts events in Asia and occasionally at the steel-tip in World Darts Federation (WDF). She is also a former Cantopop singer for Boombeat Music and show hostess.

== Music career ==
After graduating from high school, Leung was discovered by Boombeat Music in 2004 for her talent in singing. After signing up and becoming an official singer, her manager and family advised her to complete her university degree before deciding whether to continue in her career or not. Meanwhile, her company organized her to participate in big events and MV's, mainly with other big singers in the company such as Ella Koon. During this time she recorded the songs "I Was Here" and "The Whole World Love-Lost".

In 2006, Leung decided to stop singing and focus on her education. Still participating in public events however, she won the <<CASH>> Cantopop Singer/Lyricist Award. At the end of the year, she was invited to host the show Boom Sanctuary, taking over Kay Tse due to pregnancy. Completing her degree, Leung joined the 2007 New Singer's cohort. In July, she recorded her first official debut song, "Why, Why". On 9 September, she released her first album Under the Sun.

Despite some initial popularity, Leung was dropped by her entertainment company and has since reverted to a normal life.

== Darts career ==
She had her first contact with a darts in the youth center of the church in Hong Kong. There was an unused old darts soft-tip machine. The feeling of joy resulting from the game of darts made her become more interested in this sport discipline. Leung had been active as a singer, but after achieving her dream in 2016 of representing the Hong Kong team and won a Dartslive Soft Darts World Cup, she wanted going further in darts and retired from singing for being a full-time professional darts player.

In 2017, she advanced to the steel-tip Malaysian Open final, but unfortunately lost to Mozhgan Rahmani. In the same year, she represented Hong Kong at the 2017 WDF World Cup and reached the fourth round in the singles competition, losing 2–4 in legs to Anna Forsmark. In the remaining competitions of that Cup edition, she did not achieve significant success. Similarly, during the 2018 WDF Asia-Pacific Cup played a year later, she did not do well, including being knocked out in the group stage in the singles tournament.

In 2019, she achieved her best steel-dart achievement to date, advancing to the quarter-finals of the singles tournament during the 2019 WDF World Cup. Eventually she was eliminated in the match against Tori Kewish, lost 3–5 in legs. In the same year, she repeated the success from three years ago and as a member of the Hong Kong national team won the Dartslive Soft Darts World Cup title for the second time. Additionally, she was awarded by the organizers as the MVP of this tournament.

The coronavirus pandemic caused her professional career to slow down, but she is still active in sports competitions at national and continental levels.

== Awards ==
- TVB 2005 – "DIVA Most Harmonic Piece"
- The 18th "<<CASH>> Cantopop Singer/Lyricist Award" – Award Piece: "Two Seater"
- TVB 2007 – "Beautiful Pink Lady"
- Metro Hit Radio – "New best singer 2007 – Bronze"
- Road Show ultimate singers 2007 – "Ultimate New Singer 2007"
