= Austrian Open (darts) =

Austrian Open Vienna

Tournament information
- Venue: Hilton Garden Inn
- Location: Vienna
- Country: Austria
- Established: 1990
- Organisation(s): WDF
- Format: Legs
- Prize fund: €2,040

Current champion(s)
- (Belgium) Sven Verdonck (men's) (Finland) Kaisu Rekinen (women's) (Austria) Paul Freysinger (boys)

The Austrian Open is a darts tournament held at Austria and organised by the World Darts Federation. It has been held in Vienna since 2009. First edition of the men's competition took place in 1990. However, the first women's tournament took place in 2003. Tournament have an interruption caused by coronavirus pandemic.

First winners of the tournament was Liam Burke from Germany and Marion Petschenig from Austria.

== List of tournaments ==
=== Men's ===
Year	Champion	Av.	Score	Runner-Up	Av.	Prize Money			Venue
Year	Champion	Av.	Score	Runner-Up	Av.	Total	Ch.	R.-Up	Venue
1990	(Germany) Liam Burke	n/a	beat	(Austria) Gerhard Brandner	n/a	–	–	–	Vienna
1992	(England) Alan Warriner	n/a	beat	(Netherlands) Roland Scholten	n/a	–	–	–	Vienna
1999	(Austria) Franz Thaler	n/a	2 – 0	(Austria) Günther Rimser	n/a	–	–	–	Vienna
2000	Mensur Suljović	n/a	beat	(Philippines) Reynaldo Ilagan	n/a	–	–	–	Vienna
2001	Mensur Suljović (2)	n/a	beat	(Austria) Hannes Schnier	n/a	–	–	–	Vienna
2002	(Austria) August Jost	n/a	beat	(Austria) Franz Thaler	n/a	–	–	–	Vienna
2003	(Austria) Franz Thaler (2)	n/a	3 – 2	(Austria) Dietmar Burger	n/a	–	–	–	Vienna
2004	(Austria) Dietmar Burger	n/a	2 – 0	(Austria) Franz Thaler	n/a	–	–	–	Vienna
2005	(Austria) Anton Pein	n/a	beat	(Hungary) Tamás Turi	n/a	–	–	–	Vienna
2006	(Netherlands) Remco van Eijden	n/a	beat	(Cyprus) Demetris Georgiou	n/a	–	–	–	Vienna
2007	(Netherlands) Joey ten Berge	n/a	beat	(Hungary) Nándor Bezzeg	n/a	–	–	–	Vienna
2008	(Hungary) Nándor Bezzeg	n/a	beat	(Netherlands) Davy Verkooijen	n/a	–	–	–	Vienna
2009	John Michael	n/a	2 – 0	(France) Cyril Blot	n/a	€1,440	€480	€240	Haus der Begegnung, Vienna
2010	(Austria) Josef Kraus	n/a	2 – 1	Rowby-John Rodriguez	n/a	€1,440	€480	€240	Haus der Begegnung, Vienna
2011	Michal Kočík	n/a	2 – 0	Boris Krčmar	n/a	€1,440	€480	€240	Haus der Begegnung, Vienna
2012	Max Hopp	n/a	beat	Vladimir Andersen	n/a	€1,440	€480	€240	Haus der Begegnung, Vienna
2013	(Netherlands) Remco van Eijden (2)	n/a	6 – 2	Roxy-James Rodriguez	n/a	€1,440	€480	€240	Haus der Begegnung, Vienna
2014	(Wales) Martin Phillips	n/a	beat	(Austria) Aaron Hardy	n/a	€1,440	€480	€240	Hilton Garden Inn, Vienna
2015	(Netherlands) Danny Blom	n/a	6 – 5	(Netherlands) Matthew Medhurst	n/a	€1,440	€480	€240	Hilton Garden Inn, Vienna
2016	(Germany) Robert Allenstein	n/a	6 – 5	(Netherlands) Wouter Vaes	n/a	€1,440	€480	€240	Hilton Garden Inn, Vienna
2017	(Belgium) Sven Wens	n/a	beat	(Czech Republic) Daniel Bohony	n/a	€1,440	€480	€240	Hilton Garden Inn, Vienna
2018	(Belgium) Roger Janssen	n/a	6 – 1	Gábor Takács	n/a	€1,440	€480	€240	Hilton Garden Inn, Vienna
2019	(Belgium) Sven Verdonck	n/a	6 – 2	(Austria) Markus Straub	n/a	€1,440	€480	€240	Hilton Garden Inn, Vienna

=== Women's ===
Year	Champion	Av.	Score	Runner-Up	Av.	Prize Money			Venue
Year	Champion	Av.	Score	Runner-Up	Av.	Total	Ch.	R.-Up	Venue
2003	(Austria) Marion Petschenig	n/a	beat	(Austria) Judith Walkner	n/a	–	–	–	Vienna
2004	(Hungary) Nora Fekete	n/a	beat	(Austria) Monika Schartner	n/a	–	–	–	Vienna
2005	(Hungary) Zsófia Köntös	n/a	beat	(Austria) Christina Perl	n/a	–	–	–	Vienna
2006	(Czech Republic) Blanka Vojtkova	n/a	beat	(Czech Republic) Zuzana Stepanova	n/a	–	–	–	Vienna
2007	(Austria) Barbara Kuntner	n/a	beat	(Czech Republic) Zuzana Stepanova	n/a	–	–	–	Vienna
2008	(Austria) Barbara Kuntner (2)	n/a	beat	(Hungary) Nora Fekete	n/a	–	–	–	
2009	(France) Carole Frison	n/a	beat	(Hungary) Zsófia Köntös	n/a	–	–	–	Haus der Begegnung, Vienna
2010	(Hungary) Nora Fekete (2)	n/a	beat	(Slovakia) Katarina Nagyova	n/a	–	–	–	Haus der Begegnung, Vienna
2011	(Slovakia) Katarina Nagyova	n/a	2 – 1	(Austria) Jasmin Schauer	n/a	–	–	–	Haus der Begegnung, Vienna
2012	Veronika Ihász	n/a	beat	(Denmark) Hanne Johnson	n/a	–	–	–	Haus der Begegnung, Vienna
2013	Veronika Ihász (2)	n/a	beat	(Germany) Stefanie Lück	n/a	–	–	–	Haus der Begegnung, Vienna
2014	(Denmark) Ann-Louise Peters	n/a	beat	Veronika Ihász	n/a	–	–	–	Hilton Garden Inn, Vienna
2015	Veronika Ihász (3)	n/a	5 – 3	(Switzerland) Jeannette Stoop	n/a	–	–	–	Hilton Garden Inn, Vienna
2016	Veronika Ihász (4)	n/a	5 – 4	Marjolein Noijens	n/a	–	–	–	Hilton Garden Inn, Vienna
2017	(Hungary) Vivien Czipó	n/a	beat	(Czech Republic) Jana Kanovská	n/a	–	–	–	Hilton Garden Inn, Vienna
2018	Veronika Ihász (5)	n/a	5 – 1	(England) Joanne Rolls	n/a	–	–	–	Hilton Garden Inn, Vienna
2019	(Finland) Kaisu Rekinen	n/a	5 – 2	Jitka Císařová	n/a	–	–	–	Hilton Garden Inn, Vienna

=== Boys ===
Year	Champion	Av.	Score	Runner-Up	Av.	Prize Money			Venue
Year	Champion	Av.	Score	Runner-Up	Av.	Total	Ch.	R.-Up	Venue
2009	(Hungary) Sándor Kömüves	n/a	beat	(Austria) Bernhard Tschinkowitz	n/a	–	–	–	Haus der Begegnung, Vienna
2010	Rowby-John Rodriguez	n/a	beat	(Austria) Bernhard Tschinkowitz	n/a	–	–	–	Haus der Begegnung, Vienna
2011	Rowby-John Rodriguez (2)	n/a	beat	(Austria) Michael Tegl	n/a	–	–	–	Haus der Begegnung, Vienna
2012	Max Hopp	n/a	beat	Patrik Kovács	n/a	–	–	–	Haus der Begegnung, Vienna
2013	(Russia) Maxim Aldoshin	n/a	beat	Rusty-Jake Rodriguez	n/a	–	–	–	Haus der Begegnung, Vienna
2014	(Austria) Fredi Gsellmann	n/a	beat	Rusty-Jake Rodriguez	n/a	–	–	–	Hilton Garden Inn, Vienna
2015	Rusty-Jake Rodriguez	n/a	beat	(Hungary) György Vörösházi	n/a	–	–	–	Hilton Garden Inn, Vienna
2016	Rusty-Jake Rodriguez (2)	n/a	beat	(Germany) Phillip Wunsch	n/a	–	–	–	Hilton Garden Inn, Vienna
2017	(Hungary) Nándor Prés	n/a	beat	(Austria) Marco Jungwirth	n/a	–	–	–	Hilton Garden Inn, Vienna
2018	Gergely Lakatos	n/a	beat	(Germany) Nico Kern	n/a	–	–	–	Hilton Garden Inn, Vienna
2019	(Austria) Paul Freysinger	n/a	beat	(Hungary) Barnabás Nagy	n/a	–	–	–	Hilton Garden Inn, Vienna

=== Girls ===
Year	Champion	Av.	Score	Runner-Up	Av.	Prize Money			Venue
Year	Champion	Av.	Score	Runner-Up	Av.	Total	Ch.	R.-Up	Venue
2011	(Germany) Steffi Haller	n/a	beat	(Austria) Sophie Seiner	n/a	–	–	–	Haus der Begegnung, Vienna
2012	(Russia) Anastasia Klochek	n/a	beat	(Russia) Valeriia Shvetc	n/a	–	–	–	Haus der Begegnung, Vienna
2013	(Russia) Lidia Koltsova	n/a	beat	(Hungary) Vivien Czipó	n/a	–	–	–	Haus der Begegnung, Vienna
2014	(Hungary) Vivien Czipó	n/a	beat	(Austria) Samantha Ostry	n/a	–	–	–	Hilton Garden Inn, Vienna
2015	(Hungary) Vivien Czipó (2)	n/a	beat	(Hungary) Bokor Boglárka	n/a	–	–	–	Hilton Garden Inn, Vienna
2016	(Hungary) Bokor Boglárka	n/a	beat	(Czech Republic) Barbora Hospodářská	n/a	–	–	–	Hilton Garden Inn, Vienna
2017	(Hungary) Vivien Czipó (3)	n/a	beat	(Czech Republic) Barbora Hospodářská	n/a	–	–	–	Hilton Garden Inn, Vienna
2018	(Hungary) Tamara Kovács	n/a	beat	(Czech Republic) Anna Votavová	n/a	–	–	–	Hilton Garden Inn, Vienna

== See also ==
- List of BDO ranked tournaments
- List of WDF tournaments
