= Preston Ridd =

Personal information
- Nickname: Bing
- Born: 28 October 1953 (age 72) Christchurch, New Zealand
- Home town: Christchurch, New Zealand

Sport
- Sport: Darts
- Playing since: 1981
- Darts: 23 gram Puma Darts
- Laterality: Right-handed
- Walk-on music: "Livin' on a Prayer" by Bon Jovi

Organisation (see split in darts)
- BDO: 1989, 1993, 1996, 2001–2007
- PDC: 2008–2012

PDC premier events – best performances
- World Championship: Last 64: 2011

Other tournament wins
- Tournament: Years
- New Zealand Open New Zealand Masters PDC World New Zealand Qualifying Event: 1989, 1993, 1996; 2001; 2010

Preston Ridd (born 28 October 1953 from Christchurch) is a former New Zealand professional darts player. He won the New Zealand Open three times and the New Zealand Masters once.

== Career ==
He qualified for the 2011 PDC World Darts Championship as the New Zealand champion. He whitewashed Northern Ireland's Michael Mansell 4–0 in the preliminary round, but won only one leg in losing to Vincent van der Voort 3–0 in the first round.

Ridd represented New Zealand with Warren French in the 2012 PDC World Cup of Darts and together they were beaten 5–3 by Austria in the first round who will be Mensur Suljović & Dietmar Burger.

== Personal life ==
Ridd, whose parents originated from Devon, holds a British passport.

== World Championship results ==
=== PDC ===
- 2011: First round (lost to Vincent van der Voort 0–3) (sets)
