= Italian Open =

Italian Open may refer to:

- Italian Open (tennis), a Masters 1000 level tennis tournament played in Rome each year.
- Italian Open (golf), a European Tour golf tournament.
- Italian Open (darts)
