= Gibraltar Open (darts) =

Tournament information
- Venue: Victoria Stadium
- Location: Gibraltar
- Country: Gibraltar
- Established: 1985
- Organisation(s): WDF
- Format: Legs
- Prize fund: £2,500

Current champion(s)
- Daniel Zapata (men's); Christine Redhead (women's); Kilian Perales (youth's)

The Gibraltar Open is a darts tournament, first held in 1985 and annually since 2004.

== Results ==
=== Men ===
Year	Champion	Score	Runner-up
1985	(Gibraltar) James King	2–1	(Belgium) Willy Logie
1986	(Netherlands) Bert Vlaardingerbroek	2–0	(Finland) Tapani Uitos
1987	(Spain) Enrique Forner	2–1	(South Africa) Hennie Morton
1988	(Scotland) Bob Taylor	2–1	(Spain) Pedro Minan-Martinez
1989	(Spain) Juan Salpico	2–0	(Malta) Vincent Busuttil
2000	(Gibraltar) George Federico	beat	(Spain) Antonio Muñoz Ramos
2001	(Gibraltar) Tony Dawkins	beat	(Gibraltar) Francis Taylor
2004	(England) Mark Jones	4 – 3	(England) Andy Gudgeon
2005	(Gibraltar) Tab Hunter	4 – 2	(England) Allan Carrington
2006	(Wales) Wayne Davies	4 – 3	(England) Stephen Robertson
2007	(Spain) Carlos Rodriguez	4 – 1	(England) Gavin Forsythe
2008	(Catalonia) Federico Pozo	4 – 3	(Catalonia) Jose Escudero
2009	(England) John Ferrell	4 – 0	(England) Paul Harvey
2010	(England) Chris Cooper	4 – 1	(Northern Ireland) Gary Tipping
2011	(England) Andrew Gilding	4 – 1	(Spain) Francisco Ruiz
2012	(Gibraltar) Dyson Parody	4 – 2	(Gibraltar) Dylan Duo
2013	(England) Edward Brookes	4 – 1	(Catalonia) Lawrence Pink
2014	(England) Mark Budd	4 – 2	(Netherlands) Willem Mandigers
2015	(England) John Ferrell	beat	(Gibraltar) Justin Broton
2016	(England) Ian Jopling	4 – 2	(Catalonia) Josep Arimany
2017	(Denmark) Brian Løkken	beat	(England) Nillson Pritchard
2018	(Romania) Gabriel Pascaru	beat	(England) Carl Dennell
2019	(Gibraltar) Dyson Parody	4 – 3	(Argentina) Jesús Sálate
2021	(England) Gavin Smith	4 – 0	(England) Mike Norton
2022	(England) Paul Marsh	4 – 2	(Catalonia) Carlos Arola
2023	(England) Luke Littler	5 – 0	(Scotland) Andy Boulton
2024	Stowe Buntz	5 – 2	(England) Mark Stephenson

=== Women ===
Year	Champion	Score	Runner-up
2006	(England) Louise Simmonds	beat	(Wales) Jan Robbins
2007	(Scotland) Margaret Ferguson	beat	(England) Wendy Wanstall
2008	(England) Louise Carroll	4 – 1	(England) Lorraine Morris
2009	(France) Carole Frison	beat	(England) Paula Jacklin
2010	(England) Christine Redhead	4 – 1	(England) Helen Harvey
2011	(England) Shelley Bontoft	4 – 1	(England) Paula Jacklin
2012	(Spain) Laura Damont	beat	(Gibraltar) Gill Vine
2013	(England) Christine Redhead (2)	beat	(Spain) Jeanette Fischer
2014	(England) Paula Jacklin	beat	(Netherlands) Anneke Kuijten
2015	(Scotland) Susanna McGimpsey	beat	(England) Sarah Roberts
2016	(Spain) Mercedes de los Santos	4 – 0	(Spain) Maria-Jose Cardenas
2017	(Denmark) Elin Mortensen	beat	(Sweden) Linda Nilsson
2018	(Denmark) Elin Mortensen (2)	beat	(Spain) Sandra Espinosa
2019	(England) Paula Jacklin (2)	beat	(England) Bonnii Bentley
2021	(England) Laura Turner	4 – 0	(Wales) Mel Williams
2022	(England) Diane Nash	4 – 3	(England) Paula Jacklin
2023	Sophie McKinlay 72.27	5 - 2	Paula Jacklin 60.95
2024	Paige Pauling	4 - 0	Unurchimeg Tserenkhand

=== Youth ===
Year	Champion	Score	Runner-up
2013	(Gibraltar) Kian Hansen	beat	(Gibraltar) Clayton Otton
2014	(Northern Ireland) Shane Doherty	beat	(Northern Ireland) Marty Conwell
2015	(England) Nathan Street	beat	(Netherlands) Jaimy van Bavel
2016	(England) Nathan Street	beat	(Gibraltar) Sean Negrette
2017	(Spain) Victor-Manuel Rodriguez	beat	(Gibraltar) Jerome Duarte-Chipol
2018	(Gibraltar) Craig Galliano	beat	(Gibraltar) Justin Hewitt
2019	(Gibraltar) Justin Hewitt	4 – 3	(Gibraltar) Craig Galliano
2021	(England) Cayden Smith	4 – 2	(Wales) Ieuan Halsall
2022	Nico Bado	4 – 0	(Gibraltar) Casey Dyer
2023	Kilian Perales 74.44	5 – 3	Nico Bado 69.81
2024	Adam Craik	4 – 1	Thees Kogelnik
