= Northern Ireland Open =

Northern Ireland Open may refer to:

- Northern Ireland Open (darts), a professional darts tournament
- Northern Ireland Open (golf), a golf tournament on the Challenge Tour
- Northern Ireland Open (snooker), a professional snooker tournament
