= Turkish Bocce Bowling Darts Federation =

Governing body of bocce bowling darts in Turkey

- Sport: Bocce; Bowling; Darts
- Jurisdiction: Turkey
- Abbreviation: TBBDF
- Founded: 2004; 22 years ago
- Affiliation: World Boccia, International Bowling Federation, World Darts Federation
- Headquarters: Çankaya, Ankara
- Location: Turkey
- (Turkey)

The Turkish Bocce Bowling Darts Federation (Turkish: Türkiye Bocce Bowling ve Dart Federasyonu; TBBDF) is the governing body of Bocce, Bowling abd Darts sports in Turkey. It was formed in Ankara in 2004.

It is located at Korkut Reis Mah. Necatibey Cad, Kapalıçarşı 8 in Çankaya, Ankara.
