= Darren Herewini =

New Zealand darts player (born 1991)

Personal information
- Nickname: "Apocalypse"
- Born: 4 October 1991 (age 35) Auckland, New Zealand
- Home town: Porirua, New Zealand

Sport
- Sport: Darts
- Playing since: 2009
- Darts: 24 Gram Winmau Darren Herewini Signature
- Laterality: Right-handed
- Walk-on music: "Radioactive" by Imagine Dragons

Organisation (see split in darts)
- BDO: 2010–2020
- PDC: 2017
- WDF: 2010–
- Current world ranking: (WDF) NR (17 August 2026)

WDF major events – best performances
- World Championship: Last 32: 2020
- World Masters: Last 144: 2018

Other tournament wins
- Years
Canterbury Classic	2019
Canterbury Open	2019
New Zealand Open	2017
North Island Masters	2018
South Island Masters	2018
DPNZ Pro Tour	2021
Medal record
Men's Darts
Representing New Zealand
WDF World Cup
Gold medal – first place	2019 Cluj	Men's singles

Darren Herewini (born 4 October 1991) is a New Zealand professional darts player who competes in events of the World Darts Federation (WDF) tournaments. He qualified for the BDO World Darts Championship for the first time in 2020.

== Career ==
In 2017, Herewini making his PDC World Series of Darts debut qualified for the 2017 Auckland Darts Masters However, he lost to Phil Taylor 4–6 (legs).

In September 2019, Herewini qualified for the 2020 BDO World Darts Championship as the New Zealand qualifier; he played Simon Stainton in the preliminary round and won 3–1. However, he lost in the last 32 to Andy Hamilton by the same scoreline.

== World Championship results ==
=== BDO ===
- 2020: First round (lost to Andy Hamilton 1–3) (sets)
