= Izhevsk State Agricultural Academy =

Public university in Izhevsk, Russia

- Ижевская государственная сельскохозяйственная академия
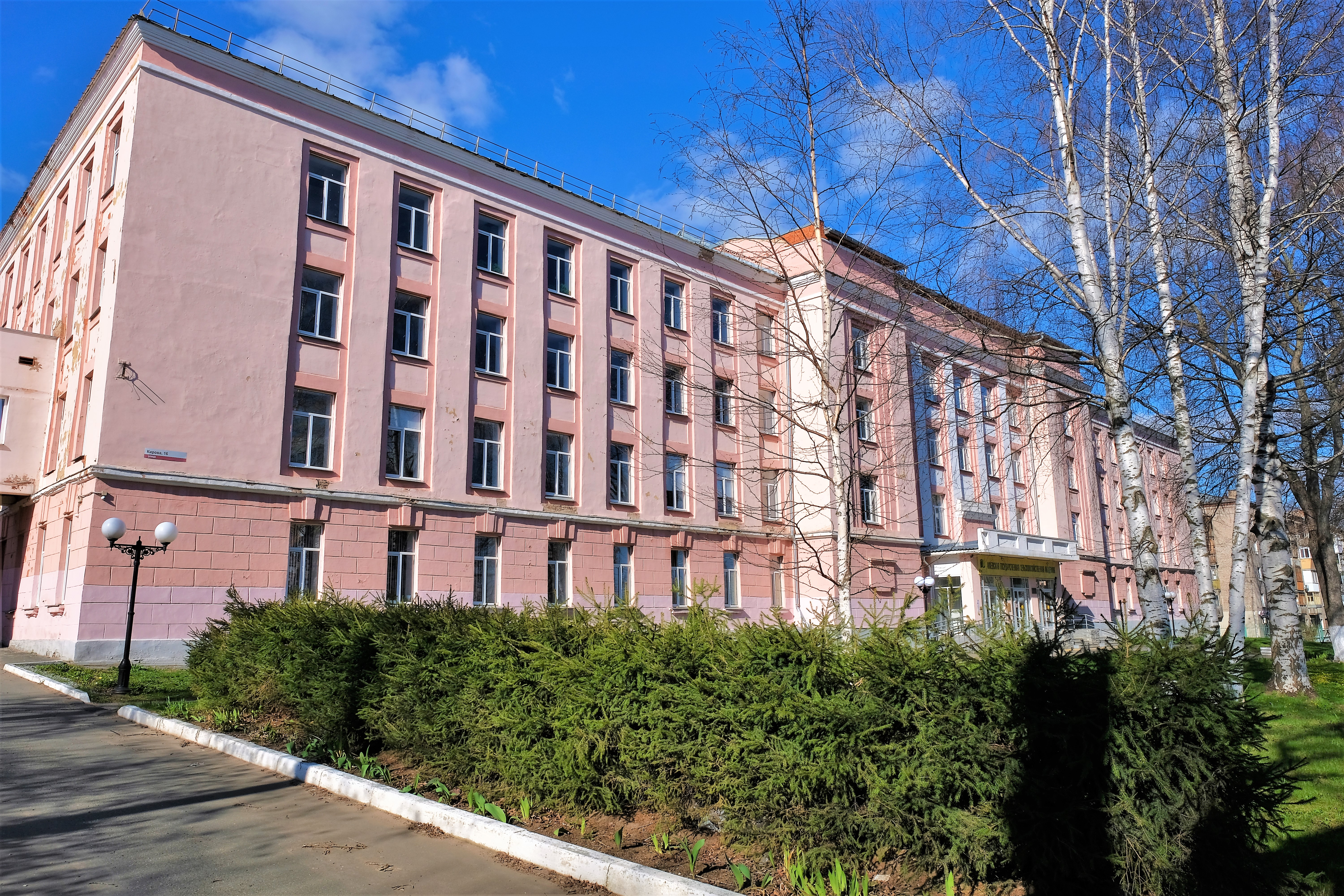
- Type: public
- Established: 1931
- Location: Izhevsk, Udmurtia, Russia; 56.8617°N 53.1788°E
- Campus: urban
- Language: Russian
- Location within Udmurt Republic Location within European Russia

Izhevsk State Agricultural Academy (Russian: Ижевская государственная сельскохозяйственная академия) is a public university located in Izhevsk, Russia. It was founded in 1931.

== History ==
The Udmurt Academy began its existence as the Moscow Zootechnical Institute of Horse Breeding and Horseracing (MZIKKK), which was established by a decree of the Council of People's Commissars of the USSR dated 2 September 1931. Before the outbreak of World War II, the institute and its archive may have been destroyed, but it may have been closed down. On the initiative of S. M. Budyonny in 1943 it was reconstituted as the Moscow Zootechnical Institute of Horse Breeding (MZIK), by the decree of the CPC of the USSR and the Central Committee of the VKP(b) of 12 May 1943.

Based on the Decree of the Council of Ministers of the USSR from 5 August 1954, and the order of the Ministry of Higher Education of the USSR from 18 August 1954, the Moscow Zootechnical Institute of Horse Breeding (MZIK) was transferred to the city of Izhevsk, Udmurt Autonomous Soviet Socialist Republic (UASSR) and was reorganized on 1 September 1954, into the Izhevsk Agricultural Institute (IzhSHI), for the development of the Autonomous Republic.

From that time the higher agricultural education in the Udmurt ASSR started. The students of the zootechnical department (with the 2nd and 3rd year students of the former MZIK who came there) and the newly created agronomical department started studying. Due to the lack of adequate teaching space, classes were held in shifts in the classrooms of the Izhevsk Mechanical Institute.

From 27 December 1984, to 19 June 1987, it was called Ustinov Agricultural Institute (UstsKhI), later the name Izhevsk Institute was returned, and since 1995 the institute was reorganized and became Izhevsk State Agricultural Academy (IzhSAA).

== Structure ==
- Agronomic
- Zooengineering
- Power Engineering and Electrification
- Agroengineering
- Economics
- Forestry
- Veterinary Medicine
- Correspondence courses
- Preparatory
- Retraining
