= Apatin Open =

Tournament information
- Venue: Junakovic Spa Center (2010–2015); Saran National House (2016); MS Elkop Bowling Hall (2017–2021); Technical Grammar School Hall (2022)
- Location: Apatin
- Country: Serbia
- Organisation(s): WDF
- Format: Legs
- Prize fund: €2,580
- Month(s) Played: July

Current champion(s)
- Dean Biškupić (men's); Veronika Ihász (women's)

The Apatin Open is an annual darts tournament on the WDF circuit that began in 2010.

== List of tournaments ==
=== Men's ===
Year	Champion	Av.	Score	Runner-Up	Av.	Prize Money			Venue
Year	Champion	Av.	Score	Runner-Up	Av.	Total	Ch.	R.-Up	Venue
2010	(Hungary) Nándor Bezzeg	n/a	6 – 3	(Slovenia) Vastimir Gavrilović	n/a	€1,400	€600	€350	Junakovic Spa Center, Apatin
2011	(Hungary) Nándor Bezzeg (2)	n/a	6 – 4	(Serbia) Milan Stanković	n/a	€1,400	€600	€350	Junakovic Spa Center, Apatin
2012	(Croatia) Zdravko Antunović	n/a	6 – 1	(Slovenia) Vastimir Gavrilović	n/a	€1,400	€600	€350	Junakovic Spa Center, Apatin
2013	(Slovenia) Vastimir Gavrilović	n/a	6 – 3	(Serbia) Aco Babić	n/a	€1,400	€600	€350	Junakovic Spa Center, Apatin
2014	Boris Krčmar	n/a	6 – 4	(Slovenia) Vastimir Gavrilović	n/a	€1,400	€600	€350	Junakovic Spa Center, Apatin
2015	Boris Krčmar (2)	n/a	6 – 5	Ron Meulenkamp	n/a	€1,400	€600	€350	Junakovic Spa Center, Apatin
2016	(Hungary) Nándor Bezzeg (3)	n/a	6 – 3	(Greece) Kostas Pantelidis	n/a	€1,400	€600	€350	Saran National House, Apatin
2017	(Serbia) Oliver Ferenc	n/a	6 – 4	Boris Krčmar	n/a	€1,400	€600	€350	MS Elkop Bowling Hall, Apatin
2018	(Serbia) Oliver Ferenc (2)	n/a	6 – 0	(Serbia) Dejan Kovačević	n/a	€1,820	€600	€300	MS Elkop Bowling Hall, Apatin
2019	Boris Krčmar (3)	n/a	6 – 1	(Serbia) Miroslav Ašćerić	n/a	€1,820	€600	€300	MS Elkop Bowling Hall, Apatin
2021	László Kádár	n/a	6 – 5	(Serbia) Oliver Ferenc	n/a	€1,820	€600	€300	MS Elkop Bowling Hall, Apatin
2022	Dean Biškupič	n/a	5 – 2	Benjamin Pratnemer	n/a	€1,820	€600	€300	Technical Grammar School Hall, Apatin

=== Women's ===
Year	Champion	Av.	Score	Runner-Up	Av.	Prize Money			Venue
Year	Champion	Av.	Score	Runner-Up	Av.	Total	Ch.	R.-Up	Venue
2014	(Serbia) Tamara Milić	n/a	5 – 0	(Serbia) Arbenita Berisha	n/a	€760	€300	€150	Junakovic Spa Center, Apatin
2015	Veronika Ihász	n/a	5 – 2	(Hungary) Csilla Kovács	n/a	€760	€300	€150	Junakovic Spa Center, Apatin
2016	Veronika Ihász (2)	n/a	5 – 1	(Hungary) Boglárka Bokor	n/a	€760	€300	€150	Saran National House, Apatin
2017	Veronika Ihász (3)	n/a	5 – 1	(Bulgaria) Ivanina Ivanova	n/a	€760	€300	€150	MS Elkop Bowling Hall, Apatin
2018	Veronika Ihász (4)	n/a	beat	(Finland) Maret Liiri	n/a	€760	€300	€150	MS Elkop Bowling Hall, Apatin
2019	Veronika Ihász (5)	n/a	beat	(Hungary) Adrienné Végső	n/a	€760	€300	€150	MS Elkop Bowling Hall, Apatin
2021	Veronika Ihász (6)	n/a	6 – 1	(Hungary) Adrienné Végső	n/a	€760	€300	€150	MS Elkop Bowling Hall, Apatin
2022	Veronika Ihász (7)	n/a	4 – 1	Jitka Císařová	n/a	€760	€300	€150	Technical Grammar School Hall, Apatin

=== Women's ===
Year	Champion	Av.	Score	Runner-up	Av.	Venue
2018	(Austria) Nico Langer	n/a	beat	(Austria) Paul Freysinger	n/a	MS Elkop Bowling Hall, Apatin
2019	(Hungary) Péter Gévai	n/a	beat	(Austria) Paul Freysinger	n/a	MS Elkop Bowling Hall, Apatin
2021	(Hungary) Andras Borbely	n/a	5 – 1	(Hungary) Balazs Pazonyi	n/a	MS Elkop Bowling Hall, Apatin
