= New Zealand Open (darts) =

Tournament information
- Venue: Motueka Recreation Centre
- Location: Motueka
- Country: New Zealand
- Established: 1981
- Organisation(s): WDF
- Format: Legs
- Prize fund: NZD 14,860

Current champion(s)
- Mark Cleaver (men's); Nicole Regnaud (women's)

The New Zealand Open is a darts tournament organized by the New Zealand Darts Council that has been held since 1981.

== List of tournaments ==
=== Men's ===
Year	Champion	Av.	Score	Runner-Up	Av.	Prize Money			Venue
Year	Champion	Av.	Score	Runner-Up	Av.	Total	Ch.	R.-Up	Venue
1981	(Northern Ireland) Steve Brennan	n/a	beat	(New Zealand) Alan Hill	n/a	n/a	n/a	n/a	Trafalgar Centre, Nelson
1983	(New Zealand) Dale Frampton	n/a	beat	(New Zealand) Rob Furmage	n/a	n/a	n/a	n/a	Trafalgar Centre, Nelson
1984	(New Zealand) Dale Frampton (2)	n/a	beat	(New Zealand) Frank Noland	n/a	n/a	n/a	n/a	Wellington
1985	(New Zealand) Lou Mataia	n/a	beat	(New Zealand) Alfred Moses	n/a	n/a	n/a	n/a	Trafalgar Centre, Nelson
1986	(New Zealand) Gordon Allpress	n/a	beat	(New Zealand) Brent Bartholomew	n/a	n/a	n/a	n/a	Wellington
1987	(New Zealand) Gary Rule	n/a	beat	(New Zealand) Timothy McCoy	n/a	n/a	n/a	n/a	Trafalgar Centre, Nelson
1988	(New Zealand) Charlie Channel	n/a	beat	(New Zealand) Wilson Downes	n/a	n/a	n/a	n/a	Wellington
1989	(New Zealand) Preston Ridd	n/a	beat	(New Zealand) Neville Moss	n/a	n/a	n/a	n/a	Trafalgar Centre, Nelson
1990	(New Zealand) Barry Whittaker	n/a	beat	(New Zealand) Alan Bolton	n/a	n/a	n/a	n/a	Wellington
1991	(New Zealand) Barry Whittaker (2)	n/a	beat	(New Zealand) John Catanach	n/a	n/a	n/a	n/a	Trafalgar Centre, Nelson
1992	(New Zealand) Zac Taua	n/a	beat	(New Zealand) Monty Tuhua	n/a	n/a	n/a	n/a	Wellington
1993	(New Zealand) Preston Ridd (2)	n/a	beat	(New Zealand) Alan Smolenski	n/a	n/a	n/a	n/a	Trafalgar Centre, Nelson
1994	(New Zealand) Barry Templeton	n/a	beat	(New Zealand) Tom Toka	n/a	n/a	n/a	n/a	Rotorua Events Centre, Rotorua
1995	(Scotland) Murray Smith	n/a	beat	(New Zealand) Neville Herbert	n/a	n/a	n/a	n/a	Trafalgar Centre, Nelson
1996	(New Zealand) Preston Ridd (3)	n/a	beat	(Scotland) Murray Smith	n/a	n/a	n/a	n/a	Rotorua Events Centre, Rotorua
1997	(New Zealand) Herbie Nathan	n/a	beat	(Scotland) Murray Smith	n/a	n/a	n/a	n/a	Trafalgar Centre, Nelson
1998	(New Zealand) Herbie Nathan (2)	n/a	beat	(New Zealand) Ted Eden	n/a	n/a	n/a	n/a	Rotorua Events Centre, Rotorua
1999	(New Zealand) Warren Parry	n/a	beat	(New Zealand) Herbie Nathan	n/a	n/a	n/a	n/a	Trafalgar Centre, Nelson
2000	(New Zealand) Warren Parry (2)	n/a	beat	(New Zealand) Peter Hunt	n/a	n/a	n/a	n/a	Rotorua Events Centre, Rotorua
2001	(New Zealand) Alan Thomson	n/a	4 – 0	Cody Harris	n/a	n/a	n/a	n/a	Trafalgar Centre, Nelson
2002	(New Zealand) Robert Grant	n/a	4 – 1	(New Zealand) Barry Whittaker	n/a	n/a	n/a	n/a	Rotorua Events Centre, Rotorua
2003	(New Zealand) Peter Hunt	n/a	4 – 2	(New Zealand) Warren Parry	n/a	n/a	n/a	n/a	Trafalgar Centre, Nelson
2004	(New Zealand) Robert Grant (2)	n/a	4 – 2	(New Zealand) Herbie Nathan	n/a	NZD 3,900	NZD 1,500	NZD 700	Rotorua Events Centre, Rotorua
2005	(New Zealand) Warren Parry (3)	n/a	4 – 1	(New Zealand) Chas Forster	n/a	NZD 3,900	NZD 1,500	NZD 700	Trafalgar Centre, Nelson
2006	Tony David	n/a	4 – 0	(New Zealand) Warren French	n/a	NZD 3,900	NZD 1,500	NZD 700	Arena 2&3, Palmerston North
2007	(New Zealand) Herbie Nathan (3)	n/a	5 – 1	(New Zealand) Chas Forster	n/a	NZD 3,900	NZD 1,500	NZD 700	Trafalgar Centre, Nelson
2008	(New Zealand) Derrick Samson	n/a	5 – 2	(New Zealand) Wayne Carey	n/a	NZD 3,900	NZD 1,500	NZD 700	Arena 2&3, Palmerston North
2009	(Australia) Koha Kokiri	n/a	5 – 0	(New Zealand) Eddie Tom	n/a	NZD 3,900	NZD 1,500	NZD 700	Trafalgar Centre, Nelson
2010	(New Zealand) Peter Hunt (2)	n/a	5 – 0	(Australia) Sonny Harris	n/a	NZD 3,900	NZD 1,500	NZD 700	Arena 2&3, Palmerston North
2011	(New Zealand) Greg Moss	n/a	5 – 0	(New Zealand) Jonathan Silcock	n/a	NZD 3,900	NZD 1,500	NZD 700	Trafalgar Centre, Nelson
2012	(New Zealand) Craig Caldwell	n/a	5 – 3	(New Zealand) Tony Carmichael	n/a	NZD 3,900	NZD 1,500	NZD 700	Rotorua Events Centre, Rotorua
2013	(New Zealand) Jonathan Silcock	96.35	5 – 0	(New Zealand) Tony Carmichael	79.50	NZD 3,900	NZD 1,500	NZD 700	Trafalgar Centre, Nelson
2014	Cody Harris	n/a	5 – 1	(New Zealand) Craig Pullen	n/a	NZD 3,900	NZD 1,500	NZD 700	Rotorua Events Centre, Rotorua
2015	Cody Harris (2)	n/a	5 – 2	(New Zealand) Craig Caldwell	n/a	NZD 3,900	NZD 1,500	NZD 700	Motueka Recreation Centre, Motueka
2016	Cody Harris (3)	n/a	6 – 2	(New Zealand) Greg Moss	n/a	NZD 3,900	NZD 1,500	NZD 700	Rotorua Events Centre, Rotorua
2017	(New Zealand) Darren Herewini	n/a	6 – 4	(New Zealand) Bernie Smith	n/a	NZD 3,900	NZD 1,500	NZD 700	Motueka Recreation Centre, Motueka
2018	(New Zealand) Tahuna Irwin	n/a	6 – 4	(New Zealand) Deon Toki	n/a	NZD 4,140	NZD 1,500	NZD 700	Rotorua Events Centre, Rotorua
2019	(New Zealand) Mark McGrath	n/a	6 – 4	Anthony Tekira	n/a	NZD 4,140	NZD 1,500	NZD 700	Motueka Recreation Centre, Motueka
2021	Haupai Puha	n/a	6 – 2	Anthony Tekira	n/a	NZD 4,140	NZD 1,500	NZD 700	Motueka Recreation Centre, Motueka
2022	Ben Robb	n/a	6 – 5	Haupai Puha	n/a	NZD 10,000	NZD 2,500	NZD 1,250	Rotorua Events Centre, Rotorua
2023	Haupai Puha (2)	n/a	6 – 1	Darren Herewini	n/a	NZD 10,340	NZD 2,600	NZD 1,300	Motueka Recreation Centre, Motueka
2024	Ben Robb (2)	n/a	7 – 5	Danny Porter	n/a	NZD 10,340	NZD 2,600	NZD 1,300	Globox Arena, Hamilton
2025	(New Zealand) Jonny Tata	n/a	7 - 2	Ben Robb	n/a	NZD 12,800	NZD 3,200	NZD 1,600	Motueka Recreation Centre, Motueka

=== Women's ===
Year	Champion	Score	Runner-Up	Prize Money			Venue
Year	Champion	Score	Runner-Up	Total	Ch.	R.-Up	Venue
1993	(New Zealand) Jannette Jonathan	beat	(New Zealand) Jill MacDonald	n/a	n/a	n/a	Trafalgar Centre, Nelson
1994	(New Zealand) Jannette Jonathan (2)	beat	(New Zealand) Ra Kura	n/a	n/a	n/a	Rotorua Events Centre, Rotorua
1995	(New Zealand) Kathy Orbell	beat	(New Zealand) Noeline Gear	n/a	n/a	n/a	Trafalgar Centre, Nelson
1996	(New Zealand) Jill MacDonald	beat	(New Zealand) Jannette Jonathan	n/a	n/a	n/a	Rotorua Events Centre, Rotorua
1997	(New Zealand) Cathy Whakatutu	beat	(New Zealand) Polly Luke	n/a	n/a	n/a	Trafalgar Centre, Nelson
1998	(New Zealand) Jannette Jonathan (3)	beat	(New Zealand) Christine Sheerin	n/a	n/a	n/a	Rotorua Events Centre, Rotorua
1999	(New Zealand) Christine Sheerin	beat	(New Zealand) Marion Morgan	n/a	n/a	n/a	Trafalgar Centre, Nelson
2000	(New Zealand) Jannette Jonathan (4)	beat	(New Zealand) Marion Morgan	n/a	n/a	n/a	Rotorua Events Centre, Rotorua
2001	(New Zealand) Marion Morgan	beat	(New Zealand) Noeline Gear	n/a	n/a	n/a	Trafalgar Centre, Nelson
2002	(New Zealand) Megan Windle	beat	(New Zealand) Carol Williams	n/a	n/a	n/a	Rotorua Events Centre, Rotorua
2003	(New Zealand) Jannette Jonathan (5)	beat	(New Zealand) Megan Smith	n/a	n/a	n/a	Trafalgar Centre, Nelson
2004	(New Zealand) Megan Smith	beat	(New Zealand) Noeline Gear	NZD 3,340	NZD 1,000	NZD 500	Rotorua Events Centre, Rotorua
2005	(New Zealand) Mihi George	beat	(New Zealand) Jannette Jonathan	NZD 3,340	NZD 1,000	NZD 500	Trafalgar Centre, Nelson
2006	(Australia) Carol Forwood	beat	(New Zealand) Christine Sheerin	NZD 3,340	NZD 1,000	NZD 500	Arena 2&3, Palmerston North
2007	(New Zealand) Jannette Jonathan (6)	beat	(New Zealand) Rachel Padget	NZD 3,340	NZD 1,000	NZD 500	Trafalgar Centre, Nelson
2008	(New Zealand) Jane Harrington	5 – 2	(New Zealand) Margaret Luke	NZD 3,340	NZD 1,000	NZD 500	Arena 2&3, Palmerston North
2009	(New Zealand) Kate Keefe	5 – 3	(New Zealand) Helen Makiha	NZD 3,340	NZD 1,000	NZD 500	Trafalgar Centre, Nelson
2010	(New Zealand) Kate Keefe (2)	4 – 3	(Australia) Barbara Daly	NZD 3,340	NZD 1,000	NZD 500	Arena 2&3, Palmerston North
2011	(New Zealand) Meta Reid	4 – 3	(New Zealand) Jannette Jonathan	NZD 3,340	NZD 1,000	NZD 500	Trafalgar Centre, Nelson
2012	(New Zealand) Christine Hay	4 – 0	(New Zealand) Dawn Unuka	NZD 3,340	NZD 1,000	NZD 500	Rotorua Events Centre, Rotorua
2013	(New Zealand) Jo Steed	6 – 2	(New Zealand) Jane Harrington	NZD 3,340	NZD 1,000	NZD 500	Trafalgar Centre, Nelson
2014	(New Zealand) Sha Hohipa	5 – 2	(New Zealand) Jannette Jonathan	NZD 3,340	NZD 1,000	NZD 500	Rotorua Events Centre, Rotorua
2015	(New Zealand) Tina Osborne	5 – 4	(New Zealand) Kate Keefe	NZD 3,340	NZD 1,000	NZD 500	Motueka Recreation Centre, Motueka
2016	(New Zealand) Tina Osborne (2)	5 – 3	(New Zealand) Taylor Kahaki	NZD 3,340	NZD 1,000	NZD 500	Rotorua Events Centre, Rotorua
2017	(New Zealand) Judy Fenton	5 – 3	(New Zealand) Jo Steed	NZD 3,340	NZD 1,000	NZD 500	Motueka Recreation Centre, Motueka
2018	(New Zealand) Judy Fenton (2)	5 – 2	Wendy Harper	NZD 3,340	NZD 1,000	NZD 500	Rotorua Events Centre, Rotorua
2019	(New Zealand) Tina Osborne (3)	5 – 3	(New Zealand) Shar Maru-Habib	NZD 3,340	NZD 1,000	NZD 500	Motueka Recreation Centre, Motueka
2021	Desi Mercer	5 – 3	(New Zealand) Mary-Anne Teinaki	NZD 3,340	NZD 1,000	NZD 500	Motueka Recreation Centre, Motueka
2022	Victoria Monaghan	5 – 4	Wendy Harper	NZD 4,000	NZD 1,200	NZD 600	Rotorua Events Centre, Rotorua
2023	Mary-Anne Teinaki	5 – 4	Kym Mitchell	NZD 4,520	NZD 1,300	NZD 650	Motueka Recreation Centre, Motueka
2024	Nicole Regnaud	6 – 3	Victoria Monaghan	NZD 4,520	NZD 1,300	NZD 650	Globox Arena, Hamilton
2025	Nicole Regnaud (2)	6 - 1	(New Zealand) Tracy MacDonald	NZD 7,740	NZD 2,200	NZD 1,100	Motueka Recreation Centre, Motueka
