= Mediterranean Cup (darts) =

Annual Mediterranean darts tournament

The Mediterranean Cup is a darts tournament that has been held since 1971. The participating countries are: Cyprus, France, Gibraltar, Greece, Italy, Malta, Catalonia, Spain & Turkey. On first editions the host nation supplies 2 teams to make even numbers. Teams consist of 4 men & 2 woman players. Matches are played as Men's Team Event, Men's Pairs & Men's Singles and Ladies Team event & Ladies Singles. Points are awarded to each nation depending on individual and team performances, with overall Gold going to the nation with most points.

== List of winners (Men's Singles) ==
Year	Champion	Score	Runner-up
1971	(England) Gerry Haywood	beat	(United States) Cam Melchiorre
1972	(Wales) Dalys Elisas	beat	(Scotland) Rab Smith
1973	(Wales) Dalys Elisas	beat	(England) Cliff Inglis
1974	(Republic of Ireland) Jim McQuillan	beat	(Scotland) Harry Heenan
1975	(England) Cliff Inglis	beat	(Scotland) Harry Heenan
1976	(England) John Lowe	beat	(United States) Conrad Daniels
1977	(England) Mick Norris	beat	(England) Bob Crosland
1978	(England) Ray Cornibert	beat	(England) Cliff Lazarenko
1979	(England) Tony Brown	beat	(England) Eric Bristow
1980	(Northern Ireland) Billy Mateer	beat	(England) Bobby George
1981	(England) Eric Bristow	beat	(Wales) Ceri Morgan
1982	(Scotland) Jocky Wilson	beat	(Northern Ireland) Steve Brennan
1983	(England) John Lowe	beat	(Republic of Ireland) PJ Moylan
1984	(United States) Dave Lee	beat	(Sweden) Stefan Lord
1985	(England) John Lowe	beat	(Australia) Terry O'Dea
1986	(Northern Ireland) Steve Brennan	beat	(Canada) Bob Sinnaeve
1987	(England) Bob Anderson	beat	(England) Eric Bristow
1988	(England) Dave Whitcombe	beat	(England) Cliff Lazarenko
1989	(Sweden) Stefan Lord	beat	(Australia) Wayne Weening
1990	(England) John Lowe	beat	(Scotland) Ronnie Sharp
1991	(England) Dennis Priestley	beat	(England) Phil Taylor
1992	(England) John Lowe	beat	(England) Peter Evison
1993	(England) Mike Gregory	beat	(Australia) Russell Stewart
1994	(England) Mike Gregory	beat	(England) Steve Beaton
1995	(England) Mike Gregory	beat	(United States) Roger Carter
1996	(England) Mike Gregory	beat	(Catalonia) Antonio Muñoz Ramos
1997	(Wales) Marshall James	beat	(Wales) Sean Palfrey
1998	(England) Mike Gregory	beat	(England) Gene Raymond
1999	(England) Gene Raymond	beat	(Wales) Marshall James
2000	(England) Mike Gregory	beat	(England) Gene Raymond
2001	(England) Robbie Widdows	beat	(Jamaica) Al Hedman
2002	(Scotland) George Dalglish	beat	(England) Andy Gudgeon
2003	(Scotland) George Dalglish	beat	(Wales) Dale Pinch
2004	(Scotland) George Dalglish	beat	(England) Davy Richardson
2005	(Republic of Ireland) John MaGowan	beat	(England) Shaun Greatbatch
2006	(Italy) Luigi Marino	4-2	(France) Christian Demazure
2007	(France) Cyril Blot	4-2	(Greece) Stathis Padelidis
2008	(Italy) Marco Apollonio	5-3	(Malta) Godfrey Abela
2009	(Greece) John Michael	4-3	(France) Cyril Blot
2010	(Turkey) Engin Kayaoglu	4-3	(Gibraltar) Dylan Duo
2011	(Greece) Kostas Pantelidis	4-3	(Turkey) Eser Tekin
2012	(Greece) Kostas Pantelidis	3-4	(Turkey) Utku Karaca
2013	(Turkey) Emre Toros	4-2	(Malta) Norbert Attard
2014	(Catalonia) Carlos Arola	4–1	(Catalonia) Josep Arimany
2015	(Turkey) Umit Uygunsozlu	4-3	(Greece) Kostas Pantelidis
2017	(France) Jacques Labre	4-3	(Malta) John Agius
2019	(Romania) Laszlo Kadar	4-2	(Spain) José Ángel Castillo
2021	(Gibraltar) Justin Hewitt	4–3	(Romania) Laszlo Kadar
2024	(Catalonia) Xavier Pla-Costa	6–3	(Catalonia) Josep Arimany

== Youth winners ==
Year	Champion	Score	Runner up
2017	(Gibraltar) Justin Hewitt	4–3	(Gibraltar) Craig Galliano
2019	(Gibraltar) Jerome Duarte	4–2	(Gibraltar) Sean Negrette
