= Gabriel Pascaru =

Personal information
- Nickname: Gabos
- Born: November 29, 1985 (age 40) Piatra Neamț, Romania

Sport
- Sport: Darts

Organisation (see split in darts)
- BDO: 2016–2020
- WDF: 2016–
- Current world ranking: (WDF) NR (17 August 2026)

WDF major events – best performances
- World Championship: Last 40: 2020
- World Masters: Last 144: 2017, 2018

Other tournament wins
- Years
Gibraltar Open	2018
Ukraine Open	2019

Gabriel Pascaru (born November 29, 1985) is a Romanian darts player who has competed in World Darts Federation events.

== Career ==
In 2018, Pascaru won the Gibraltar Open. He won the Ukraine Open in 2019.

In September 2019, Pascaru qualified for the 2020 BDO World Darts Championship as the Eastern European Qualifier, but lost 3–1 to Justin Hood in the preliminary round.

== World Championship results ==
=== BDO ===
- 2020: Preliminary round (lost to Justin Hood 1–3)
