= Mozhgan Rahmani =

Iranian darts player (b. 1989)

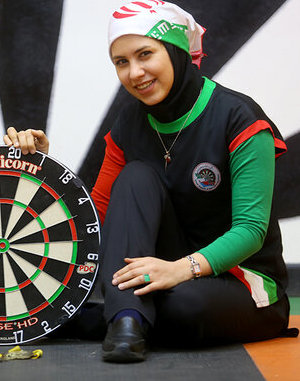

Personal information
- Born: 31 December 1989 (age 36) Tehran, Iran

Sport
- Sport: Darts
- Playing since: 2015
- Laterality: Right-handed

Organisation (see split in darts)
- BDO: 2016–2020
- PDC: 2019–
- WDF: 2016–
- Current world ranking: (WDF W) NR (17 August 2026)

Other tournament wins
- Years
Malaysian Open	2017, 2019
Shiraz Open	2017

Mozhgan Rahmani (Persian: مژگان رحمانی, born 31 December 1989) is an Iranian darts player. Since 2017, she has been a member of the Iranian National Darts Team. She is the first Iranian in Iran's Darts history to be inducted into Professional Darts Corporation. She is an Iranian legionary in Malaysia's DURY team. The only Iranian athlete interviewed by Sky Sports and RTL Group.

== Career ==
She was the runner-up of IRIDA 2016 just five months after she started playing darts professionally 2016. Five months later, she earned runner-up in the world's ranking in Shiraz Open 2016. In 2017 she became a member of Iran's darts national team and reached 28th place in the world ranking by winning the Shiraz open and Malaysia open. She is the only Iranian who has played in the world PDC competitions.

== Achievements ==
=== International ===
1. In 2016, For the first time, Mozhan reached the championship stage of the competition and won the runner-up. She got 63 points in world's ranking (world ranking of 117).
2. In 2017, She participated in Shiraz Open and Malaysian Open. She won both of those competitions, earning 90 pts in Shiraz and 90v pts in Malaysia, reaching a world rank of 28.
3. In the 2018 Mediterranean open, she and her team won the competition by beating Turkey in the finals.
4. In the 2018 Malaysia open, she reached the top 32 in individual and 8 in doubles.
5. In 2019, Selangor opened (SO10); in individual play, she reached the top 8 and she got 22 world ranking points. In the threesome, she and her team came Runner's up.
6. In 2019, Mozhgan participated in PDC Asian Tour Stage 5 and 6 in Tacloban, Philippines, representing her country for the first time in PDC. In the Philippines Open 2019, she reached the top 16.
7. She participated at the Bengal Rowing Club (BRC) tournament in India in 5 sections. In Women's Singles, she won the gold medal losing only one leg and winning all of her matches with a 3-0 result. In Mixed Doubles, she partnered with Nitin Kumar (PDC World Championship 2018 player), and they won first place by defeating an Australian team with 3-0 result. In Threesome, she won a runner up, and in open doubles, she reached the top 8 with her teammate "Asha", an Indian player. In the Team Event, her team reached the top 8. She was announced as the Player of the Tournament.
8. In 2019, Mozhgan participated in PDC Asian Tour Stage 11 and 12 in Singapore, the only representing her country in PDC.also the only woman from Asia in Stage 11 PDC Asian Tour
9. Malaysia Open 2019, ladies champion.
10. She participated at the Dutch Open 2020 in Assen. In the couple tournament on Friday, January 31st, she played with the Polish Monika van Malsen - Bakalarcyk. They reached the last 32 and lost to Winstanley Sutton. On Saturday, February first, she played in a single tournament. She lost in the third round.
11. The only Iranian athlete interviewed by Sky Sports and RTL

=== National ===
1. Runner up of Iran, June 2016
2. Champion of Iran, March 2017
3. Champion of Iran, June 2017
4. Champion of Iran, September 2017
5. Champion of Iran, December 2017
6. Champion of Iran (Prime league), January 2018
7. Champion of Iran, March 2018
8. Champion of Iran, June 2018
9. Champion of Iran, September 2018
10. Champion of Iran, March 2019
11. Champion of Iran, June 2019
