= Malaysian Open (darts) =

Tournament information
- Venue: The Federal Kuala Lumpur
- Location: Kuala Lumpur
- Country: Malaysia
- Established: 1980
- Organisation(s): WDF
- Format: Legs
- Prize fund: MYR 40,000

Current champion(s)
- Man Lok Leung (men's); Giselle Bulaho (women's)

The Malaysian Open is a darts tournament which has been held since 2001.

== List of tournaments ==
=== Men's ===
Year	Champion	Score	Runner-up	Total Prize Money	Champion	Runner-up
1980	(Singapore) Paul Lim	beat	(Philippines) Ricky Castro	n/a	n/a	n/a
1992	(Singapore) Harith Lim	beat	(Thailand) Kenneth Pickering	n/a	n/a	n/a
1998	(New Zealand) Peter Hunt	beat	(Australia) Wayne Weening	n/a	n/a	n/a
2001	(Thailand) Damrongsak Dam	bt	(Malaysia) Kesava Roa	?	?	?
2002	(Malaysia) Anandan Tandrian	bt	(Thailand) Natthakhom Daochngan	?	?	?
2003	(Malaysia) Osman Hamid	bt	(Malaysia) Mathivanan Selvarajoo	?	?	?
2004	(Malaysia) Mathivanan Selvarajoo	bt	(Malaysia) Tengku Shah	?	?	?
2005	(Malaysia) Selbaraju Subramaniam	bt	(Singapore) Paul Morier	?	?	?
2006	(Malaysia) Suresh Raj	bt	(Singapore) Ho-Ah Tee	?	?	?
2007	(Malaysia) Im Seng-Heng	bt	(Malaysia) Rosidi Puasa	MYR 5,600	MYR 2,000	MYR 1,000
2008	(Malaysia) Tengku Shah	bt	(Philippines) Lourence Ilagan	MYR 5,600	MYR 2,000	MYR 1,000
2009	(Malaysia) Joseph Clairines	bt	(Malaysia) Mohammed Sapup	MYR 5,600	MYR 2,000	MYR 1,000
2010	(Philippines) Ronald Briones	bt	(Malaysia) Tengku Shah	MYR 5,600	MYR 2,000	MYR 1,000
2012	(Philippines) Brunno Parungao	bt	(Brunei) Pengiran Yaakup	MYR 5,200	MYR 2,000	MYR 800
2013	(Thailand) Attapol Eupakaree	bt	(Malaysia) Amin Abdul-Ghani	MYR 13,500	MYR 5,000	MYR 2,500
2014	(Philippines) Juanito Gionson	bt	(Philippines) Paolo Nebrida	MYR 8,500	MYR 3,000	MYR 1,500
2015	(Philippines) Lourence Ilagan	bt	(Japan) Daisuke Akamatsu	MYR 9,300	MYR 3,000	MYR 1,500
2016	(Hong Kong) Royden Lam	bt	(Malaysia) Mark Jumin	MYR 12,000	MYR 5,000	MYR 2,000
2017	(Philippines) Donjem Dimacullangan	bt	(Philippines) Christian Perez	MYR 12,000	MYR 5,000	MYR 2,000
2018	(Philippines) Christian Perez	bt	(Philippines) Paolo Nebrida	MYR 8,500	MYR 3,000	MYR 1,500
2019	(Malaysia) Zulrizan Azdan	6 – 5	Lourence Ilagan	MYR 8,500	MYR 3,000	MYR 1,500
2023	Man Lok Leung	5 – 4	Bobby Geba	MYR 8,500	MYR 3,000	MYR 1,500
2024	(Philippines) Ryan-Jay Galceran	5 - 4	(Malaysia) Mohd Sairol Bin Mohamed Salim	MYR 8,500	MYR 3,000	MYR 1,500
2025				MYR 17,200	MYR 5,000	MYR 2,500

=== Women's ===
Year	Champion	Score	Runner-up	Total Prize Money	Champion	Runner-up
2001	(Malaysia) Connie-Loo Sim-Woo	beat	(Malaysia) Nithya Ammal			
2003	(Malaysia) Loo-Phaik Koo	beat	(Singapore) Alice Koh			
2004	(Malaysia) Nancy Ambrose	beat	(Malaysia) Zahiran Mahmud			
2005	(Malaysia) Nancy Ambrose (2)	beat	(Malaysia) Norlaiza Jaya			
2006	(Malaysia) Daisy Jok	beat	(Malaysia) Norlaiza Jaya			
2007	(Malaysia) Nancy Ambrose (3)	beat	(Malaysia) Loo-Phaik Koo			
2008	(Malaysia) Roselyn David	beat	(Singapore) Serene Phey			
2009	(Philippines) Analiza Awitan	beat	(Malaysia) Merlyn Mudi			
2010	(Philippines) Analiza Awitan (2)	beat	(Malaysia) Pipa Walter			
2012	(Malaysia) Nur-Aliyah Abdullah	beat	(Malaysia) Monica Lajawa			
2013	(Malaysia) Bernadette Walter	beat	(Malaysia) Rohana Jalil			
2014	(Philippines) Leonida Ticman	beat	(Malaysia) Rohana Jalil			
2015	(Malaysia) Monique Liduin	beat	(Singapore) Christina Koh			
2016	(Philippines) Angelyn Detablan	beat	(Malaysia) Michelle Fernandez			
2017	(Iran) Mozhgan Rahmani	beat	(Hong Kong) Cathy Leung			
2018	(Malaysia) Nur-Sazleena Muliyono	beat	(Malaysia) Melania Maidi	MYR 5,600	MYR 2,000	MYR 1,000
2019	(Iran) Mozhgan Rahmani (2)	beat	(Philippines) Lovely-Mae Orbeta	MYR 5,600	MYR 2,000	MYR 1,000
2023	(Philippines) Giselle Bulaho	3 – 1	(India) Mahi Bosmia	MYR 3,500	MYR 1,500	MYR 650
2024	(Philippines) Janice Hinojales	4 - 3	(Malaysia) Nur-Sazleena bt Muliyono	MYR 3,500	MYR 1,500	MYR 650
2025				MYR 7,120	MYR 2,000	MYR 1,000
