= Veronika Ihász =

Hungarian darts player

Personal information
- Born: 20 September 1985 (age 41) Csorna, Hungary
- Home town: Nyúl, Hungary

Sport
- Sport: Darts
- Playing since: 2009
- Darts: 21g Harrows
- Laterality: Right-handed
- Walk-on music: "Ezt Egy Életen Át Kell Játszani" by Tamás Hevesi

Organisation (see split in darts)
- BDO: 2009–2020
- WDF: 2009–
- Current world ranking: (WDF W) 37 (17 August 2026)

WDF major events – best performances
- World Championship: Last 16: 2022, 2023
- World Masters: Last 16: 2024

Other tournament wins
- Years
| Apatin Open | 2015, 2016, 2017, 2018, 2019, 2021, 2022 |
| Austrian Open | 2012, 2013, 2015, 2016, 2018 |
| Budapest Classic | 2021, 2023 |
| Budapest Masters | 2021, 2023 |
| Carinthian Open | 2011 |
| Hungarian Classic | 2020 |
| Hungarian Masters | 2020 |
| Hungarian Open | 2009, 2013, 2014, 2015 |
| Serbia Open | 2022 |
Medal record
Women's Darts
Representing Hungary
WDF Europe Cup
| Bronze medal – third place | 2022 Gandía | Women's singles |
EDF European Ch'ship
| Gold medal – first place | 2013 Podčetrtek | Women's cricket |
| Silver medal – second place | 2012 Podčetrtek | Women's singles |
| Silver medal – second place | 2013 Podčetrtek | Women's singles |
EDU European Ch'ship
| Silver medal – second place | 2014 Poreč | Women's singles |
| Bronze medal – third place | 2016 Poreč | Women's cricket |

Veronika Ihász (born 20 September 1985) is a Hungarian professional darts player who plays in the World Darts Federation (WDF) events. She is a seven-time Apatin Open Champion and first Hungarian player who qualified for the WDF World Darts Championship.

== Career ==
Ihász started playing darts before 2009. In 2009, she took her first triumph at the Hungarian Open where she beat Viktória Kiss. In the following years, she maintained a high position in the national ranking of women. In 2011, she won another international tournament Carinthian Open. She also advanced to the quarter-finals in Belgium Open and Czech Open.

In 2021, she won Budapest Classic and Budapest Masters. With these good results, Ihász qualified for the 2022 WDF World Darts Championship for the first time in her career. There she won first match against Paula Murphy with a whitewash. Then in the second round match, she hit the biggest outshot for a female competitor in World Professional Darts Championship history with a 164, but lost 1–2 in sets to Beau Greaves.

== World Championship results ==
=== WDF ===
- 2022: Second round (lost to Beau Greaves 1–2) (sets)
- 2023: Second round (lost to Lorraine Winstanley 0–2)
- 2024: First round (lost to Kirsty Hutchinson 1–2)

== Performance timeline ==
| Tournament | 2017 | 2018–2021 | 2022 | 2023 | 2024 |
|---|---|---|---|---|---|
WDF Ranked televised events
| World Championship | DNQ | | 2R | 2R | 1R |
| World Masters | 3R | DNP | | NH | 5R |
