= 2024 WDF calendar =

Tournament information
- Dates: Yearly
- Country: Worldwide
- Organisation(s): WDF
- Format: 501 Legs (men's & women's)
- Prize fund: Depends on tournament's category

2024 WDF season of darts comprises every tournament of World Darts Federation. The prize money of the tournaments may vary depending on category.

Two of WDF's most prestigious events to be held in 2024 are due the WDF World Darts Championship (to be held in November–December), and the four WDF Continental Cup's; WDF Africa Cup (April), WDF Europe Cup (September), WDF Americas Cup (October–November) and WDF Asia-Pacific Cup (early November).

2024 is the fourth year in darts under WDF-sole management after the demise of BDO in 2020.

== Tournament categories, points & prize money ==
World Darts Federation		Points						
Category	Prize Fund ($)	1st	2nd	3/4	5/8	9/16	17/32	33/64
Platinum	It depends on each tournament	270	167	103	64	39	26	13
Gold	It depends on each tournament	180	111	68	43	26	17	9
Silver	It depends on each tournament	90	56	34	21	13	9	
Bronze	It depends on each tournament	45	28	17	11	6		

== Calendar ==
=== January ===
Date	Tournament	Cat.	Venue	City	Prize money	Men's			Women's		
Date	Tournament	Cat.	Venue	City	Prize money	winner	score	runner-up	winner	score	runner-up
January 20	Las Vegas Open	Gold	Tuscany Suites and Casino	(United States) Paradise	$11,560	(Canada) Jacob Taylor	6–5	(Canada) Jeff Smith	(England) Fallon Sherrock	5–1	(England) Wendy Reinstadtler
January 21	Las Vegas Classic	Silver	Tuscany Suites and Casino	(United States) Paradise	$5,980	(Canada) Jeff Smith	5–0	(United States) Robbie Phillips	(England) Fallon Sherrock	5–2	(England) Deta Hedman
January 26–27	Reykjavik International Games	Non-ranked	Bullseye Reykjavík	(Iceland) Reykjavík	n/a	(Iceland) Alexander Veigar Þorvaldsson	5–3	(Iceland) Petúr Guðmundsson	(Iceland) Brynja Herborg	4–0	(Iceland) Árdís Guðjónsdóttir
January 27–28	Romanian Classic	Silver	Radisson Blu Hotel	(Romania) Bucharest	€8,000	(Netherlands) Jimmy van Schie	5–4	(Netherlands) Alexander Merkx	(England) Deta Hedman	5–0	(Scotland) Lorraine Hyde
January 28	Romanian Open	Silver	Radisson Blu Hotel	(Romania) Bucharest	€8,000	(Netherlands) Alexander Merkx	5–3	(Hungary) Patrik Kovács	(England) Deta Hedman	5–2	(Wales) Eve Watson

=== February ===
Date	Tournament	Cat.	Venue	City	Prize money	Men's			Women's		
Date	Tournament	Cat.	Venue	City	Prize money	winner	score	runner-up	winner	score	runner-up
February 3	Canterbury Classic	Silver	Canterbury & Suburban Darts Assoc.	(New Zealand) Christchurch	NZ$7,725	(New Zealand) Hayden Garing	6–4	(New Zealand) Tony Carmichael	(New Zealand) Nicole Regnaud	5–0	(New Zealand) Lisa Waerehu
February 3	Groundhog Open	Bronze	Mirage Sports Bar	(United States) Columbine	$2,440	(United States) Leonard Gates	5–0	(United States) Ed LaBarbera	(United States) Emily Kaufhold	4–2	(United States) Tammy Dauber
February 3–4	Dutch Open	Platinum	De Bonte Wever	(Netherlands) Assen	€26,250	(Netherlands) Jarno Bottenberg	3–2	(Netherlands) Wesley Plaisier	(England) Beau Greaves	5–1	(Netherlands) Aileen de Graaf
February 3–4	Snoflake Open	Non-ranked	Edmonton Inn & Conference Centre	(Canada) Edmonton	C$5,400	(Canada) Robbie Mills	bt.	(Canada) Ken MacNeil	(Canada) Sora Takahashi	bt.	(Canada) Brenda Moreau
February 10	Lakitelek Masters	Bronze	Hungarikum Liget	(Hungary) Lakitelek	HUF1,020,000	(Belgium) Sybren Gijbels	5–1	(Hungary) József Rucska	(Czech Republic) Jitka Císařová	5–2	(Hungary) Alexandra Bogár
February 11	Lakitelek Classic	Bronze	Hungarikum Liget	(Hungary) Lakitelek	HUF1,020,000	(Austria) Hannes Schnier	5–4	(Romania) László Kádár	(Hungary) Gréta Tekauer	5–0	(Czech Republic) Anna Votavová
February 17	Syracuse Open	Non-ranked	Crowne Plaza	(United States) Syracuse	$4,800	(United States) Doug Boehm	4–1	(United States) Matt Arpin	(United States) Aaja Jalbert	4–1	(United States) Tracy Feiertag
February 17–18	Scottish Classic	Silver	Normandy Hotel Glasgow	(Scotland) Renfrew	£7,210	(Scotland) Glen Parsons	5–4	(England) Dave Prins	(Netherlands) Aileen de Graaf	5–2	(Netherlands) Lerena Rietbergen
February 18	Scottish Open	Silver	Normandy Hotel Glasgow	(Scotland) Renfrew	£7,210	(England) Gary Robson	5–4	(England) Kieran Smith	(England) Fallon Sherrock	5–0	(Sweden) Vicky Pruim
February 24	Camellia Classic	Non-ranked	Wyndham Sacramento	(United States) North Highlands	$6,780	(United States) Adam Sevada	bt.	(United States) Chris Lim	(United States) Lisa Yee	bt.	
February 24	Shoot for the Moon	Non-ranked	DoubleTree by Hilton	(United States) Decatur	$5,340	(United States) Leonard Gates	2–0	(United States) Danny Baggish	(United States) Stacey Tullock	2–1	(United States) Andrea Taylor
February 24	Port City Open	Non-ranked	DoubleTree by Hilton Hotel Portland	(United States) South Portland	$4,850	(United States) Matt Arpin	4–1	(Canada) Dave Cameron	(United States) Aaja Jalbert	3–1	(United States) Cali West
February 24	Slovak Open	Silver	x-bionic® sphere	(Slovakia) Šamorín	€8,020	(Slovenia) Benjamin Pratnemer	5–4	(Romania) László Kádár	(England) Paige Pauling	5–0	(Slovakia) Martina Sulovská
February 25	Slovak Masters	Bronze	x-bionic® sphere	(Slovakia) Šamorín	€3,160	(England) Antony Allen	5–2	(Hungary) Nándor Prés	(Germany) Monique Lessmeister	5–1	(Slovakia) Martina Sulovská
February 25	South Australian Classic	Gold	Licensed Club Darts Association	(Australia) Salisbury Park	AU$16,025	(Australia) Howard Jones	7–6	(Australia) Brandon Weening	(Australia) Amanda Loch	6–3	(Australia) Joanne Hadley

=== March ===
Date	Tournament	Cat.	Venue	City	Prize money	Men's			Women's		
Date	Tournament	Cat.	Venue	City	Prize money	winner	score	runner-up	winner	score	runner-up
March 2–3	Halifax Open	Non-ranked	Bedford Legion Club	(Canada) Bedford	C$1,625	(Canada) Jason Smith	bt.	(Canada) Brian Cyr	(Canada) Darlene MacLeod	bt.	(Canada) Emily Alford
March 3	NSW Great Lakes Open	Non-ranked	Club Forster	(Australia) Forster	AU$4,380	(Australia) Brendan Porter	5–3	(Australia) Scott Bretherton	(Australia) Monica Ribeiro	4–0	(Australia) Leanne Clegg
March 7–10	Isle of Man Masters	Silver	Villa Marina	(Isle of Man) Douglas	£7,060	(England) Carl Wilkinson	5–4	(Northern Ireland) Neil Duff	(England) Beau Greaves	5–1	(Scotland) Sophie McKinlay
March 8–10	Isle of Man Classic	Silver	Villa Marina	(Isle of Man) Douglas	£7,060	(Scotland) Jim McEwan	5–2	(England) Lewis Bell	(Sweden) Vicky Pruim	5–4	(England) Beau Greaves
March 9–10	Isle of Man Open	Non-ranked	Villa Marina	(Isle of Man) Douglas	£14,100	(England) Carl Wilkinson	5–2	(Wales) Deian Roberts	(England) Beau Greaves	5–1	(Netherlands) Lerena Rietbergen
March 10	West Coast Classic	Non-ranked	Belmont Sport & Recreation Club	(Australia) Cloverdale	AU$3,520	(Australia) Mitchel Beswick	5–4	(Australia) Joe Comito	(Australia) Angela Clarke	5–1	(Australia) Toila Harrison
March 16	Missouri St. Patricks Open	Bronze	Inn at Grand Glaize	(United States) Osage Beach	$2,680	(United States) Leonard Gates	6–2	(United States) Kevin Luke	(United States) Kaitlyn McKinley	4–0	(United States) Hannah Smiley
March 16	WDF Youth Challenge (U18)	Gold	JUFA Hotel Wien	(Austria) Vienna	n/a	(Latvia) Ralfs Laumanis	5–2	(Czech Republic) Jan Ligus	(Italy) Aurora Fochesato	5–2	(Germany) Kira Mertens
March 16–17	WDF Youth Challenge (U23)	Gold	JUFA Hotel Wien	(Austria) Vienna	n/a	(Hungary) László Ancsin	5–4	(Austria) Marcel Steinacher	(Hungary) Gréta Tekauer	5–2	(Germany) Julia Siek
March 16–17	Shediac Open	Non-ranked	Shédiac Multipurpose Centre	(Canada) Shédiac	C$2,690	(Canada) Brian Cyr	5–2	(Canada) Dylan Jenkins	(Canada) Joanne Luke	4–1	(Canada) Josianne Fenech
March 23	Tórshavn Open	Bronze	Glasir Sports Hall	(Faroe Islands) Tórshavn	kr.20,400	(Faroe Islands) Jan McIntosh	5–2	(Sweden) Edwin Torbjörnsson	(Denmark) Michelle Merlit	5–3	(Hungary) Gréta Tekauer
March 24	Faroe Islands Open	Bronze	Glasir Sports Hall	(Faroe Islands) Tórshavn	kr.20,400	(Sweden) Edwin Torbjörnsson	5–3	(Bulgaria) Dilyan Kolev	(Hungary) Gréta Tekauer	5–1	(Denmark) Michelle Merlit
March 23	Virginia Beach Classic	Silver	Wyndham Virginia Beach Oceanfront	(United States) Virginia Beach	$6,725	(United States) Jason Brandon	5–4	(United States) Danny Young	(United States) Cali West	5–2	(United States) Paula Murphy
March 30	South Island Masters	Bronze	Otepuni Community Hub	(New Zealand) Invercargill	NZ$3,400	(New Zealand) Kayden Milne	5–3	(New Zealand) Ben Robb	(New Zealand) Wendy Harper	5–1	(New Zealand) Tara Mears
March 31	Victorian Easter Classic	Bronze	Geelong Darts Club	(Australia) Corio	AU$5,480	(Australia) Brody Klinge	6–3	(Australia) Danny Porter	(Australia) Jackie Marks	5–3	(Australia) Joanne Hadley

=== April ===
Date	Tournament	Cat.	Venue	City	Prize money	Men's			Women's		
Date	Tournament	Cat.	Venue	City	Prize money	winner	score	runner-up	winner	score	runner-up
April 6	White Mountain Shootout	Non-ranked	Town & Country Inn and Resort	(United States) Shelburne	$4,240	(United States) Leonard Gates	5–0	(United States) Aaron Jalbert	(United States) Cali West	5–1	(United States) Tracy Feiertag
April 13	Budapest Classic	Bronze	BOK Sportcsarnok	(Hungary) Budapest	HUF1,020,000	(Belgium) Sybren Gijbels	5–4	(Hungary) Patrik Kovács	(Germany) Irina Armstrong	5–2	(Hungary) Veronika Ihász
April 14	Budapest Masters	Bronze	BOK Sportcsarnok	(Hungary) Budapest	HUF1,020,000	(Hungary) Patrik Kovács	5–4	(Netherlands) Pim van Bijnen	(Czech Republic) Jitka Císařová	5–3	(Hungary) Alexandra Bogár
April 13	Iceland Open	Bronze	Bullseye Reykjavík	(Iceland) Reykjavík	kr332,000	(Faroe Islands) Jan McIntosh	5–2	(Sweden) Edwin Torbjörnsson	(Sweden) Maud Jansson	5–4	(Sweden) Milou Emriksdotter
April 14	Iceland Masters	Bronze	Bullseye Reykjavík	(Iceland) Reykjavík	kr348,000	(Sweden) Edwin Torbjörnsson	5–3	(Faroe Islands) Jan McIntosh	(Hungary) Gréta Tekauer	5–4	(Sweden) Maud Jansson
April 20	Ivy Hampton Memorial	Silver	Gillen Club	(Australia) Gillen	AU$6,800	(Australia) Brandon Weening	6–2	(Australia) Peter Machin	(Australia) Joanne Hadley	6–5	(Australia) Amanda Loch
April 21	Billie Hill Memorial	Silver	Gillen Club	(Australia) Gillen	AU$6,800	(Australia) Brandon Weening	6–1	(Australia) Peter Machin	(Australia) Joanne Hadley	6–5	(Australia) Kym Mitchell
April 20	Estonia Open	Bronze	Radisson Blu Hotel Olümpia	(Estonia) Tallinn	€2,580	(Sweden) Björn Lejon	5–3	(Latvia) Ralfs Laumanis	(Sweden) Anna Forsmark	4–2	(Sweden) Maud Jansson
April 21	Tallinn Open	Bronze	Radisson Blu Hotel Olümpia	(Estonia) Tallinn	€2,360	(England) Scott Walters	5–1	(Belgium) Sybren Gijbels	(Hungary) Gréta Tekauer	4–1	(Netherlands) Lerena Rietbergen
April 21	North Island Masters	Bronze	Hastings Darts Association	(New Zealand) Hastings	NZ$3,820	(New Zealand) Ben Robb	5–2	(New Zealand) Jonny Tata	(New Zealand) Nicole Regnaud	5–2	(New Zealand) Wendy Harper
April 28	Murray Bridge Grand Prix	Bronze	Murray Bridge Darts Club	(Australia) White Hill	AU$5,000	(Australia) Brayden Sperling	5–1	(Australia) Aaron Morrison	(Australia) Amanda Loch	4–0	(Australia) Joanne Hadley

=== May ===
Date	Tournament	Cat.	Venue	City	Prize money	Men's			Women's		
Date	Tournament	Cat.	Venue	City	Prize money	winner	score	runner-up	winner	score	runner-up
May 4	Cleveland Extravaganza	Non-ranked	Best Western Plus	(United States) Strongsville	$2,960	(United States) Levi Kransel	3–0	(Canada) Jim Long	(United States) Paula Murphy	3–0	(United States) Kelly Thibault
May 4	Denmark Open	Gold	Granly Hockey Arena	(Denmark) Esbjerg	DKK139,200	(England) Connor Scutt	6–1	(Netherlands) Jimmy van Schie	(England) Beau Greaves	5–2	(Scotland) Lorraine Hyde
May 5	Denmark Masters	Silver	Granly Hockey Arena	(Denmark) Esbjerg	DKK60,600	(Sweden) Andreas Harrysson	6–3	(Scotland) Gary Stone	(England) Beau Greaves	5–4	(Wales) Rhian O'Sullivan
May 18	John Wilkie Memorial	Bronze	Hutt Valley Darts Association	(New Zealand) Taitā	NZ$4,800	(New Zealand) Ben Robb	5–1	(New Zealand) Brad Hamill	(New Zealand) Wendy Harper	5–2	(New Zealand) Shar Maru-Habib
May 18	Oregon Open	Bronze	Holiday Inn Portland-Airport	(United States) Portland	$2,500	(Canada) Rory Hansen	5–0	(United States) Jeff Leonard	(United States) Sally Kelly	4–2	(United States) Carole Herriott
May 18	Lithuania Open	Bronze	Žalgiris Arena	(Lithuania) Kaunas	€2,425	(England) Matt Dickinson	5–4	(Latvia) Ralfs Laumanis	(Hungary) Gréta Tekauer	5–2	(Lithuania) Sandra Rimkevičiūtė
May 19	Kaunas Open	Bronze	Žalgiris Arena	(Lithuania) Kaunas	€2,425	(Lithuania) Darius Labanauskas	5–0	(Italy) Massimo Alfieri	(Hungary) Gréta Tekauer	5–2	(Estonia) Marika Sarrapik
May 18	Royal Grafenegg Masters	Bronze	Schloss Grafenegg	(Austria) Grafenegg	€3,015	(Netherlands) Moreno Blom	5–0	(Slovakia) Vladimír Zaťko	(Czech Republic) Jitka Císařová	4–0	(Austria) Tanja Messner
May 19	Team X-Treme Open	Bronze	Schloss Grafenegg	(Austria) Grafenegg	€3,015	(Netherlands) Jimmy van Schie	5–3	(Slovenia) Benjamin Pratnemer	(Czech Republic) Jitka Císarová	4–0	(Hungary) Veronika Ihász
May 18–19	Cyprus Classic	Bronze	Odysseia Hotel Kapetanios	(Cyprus) Limassol	€2,400	(Netherlands) Erik van Manen	5–1	(Cyprus) Andreas Nikolaou	(Greece) Evangelia Vidali	4–1	(Hungary) Lilla Szakál
May 19	Cyprus Masters	Bronze	Odysseia Hotel Kapetanios	(Cyprus) Limassol	€2,850	(England) Bradley Kirk	5–3	(Greece) John Michael	(Czech Republic) Anna Hlavová	4–1	(Cyprus) Yolanda Korradou
May 26	Sunshine State Classic	Silver	Inala Darts Club	(Australia) Inala	AU$7,000	(Australia) Danny Porter	6–2	(Australia) Anthony Shreeve	(New Zealand) Wendy Harper	5–0	(Australia) Tereasa Morris
May 26	Nordic Cup Open	Bronze	Bullseye Reykjavík	(Iceland) Reykjavík	ISK194.475	(Sweden) Björn Lejon	5–2	(Sweden) Edwin Torbjörnsson	(Denmark) Michelle Merlit	6–5	(Sweden) Maud Jansson

=== June ===
Date	Tournament	Cat.	Venue	City	Prize money	Men's			Women's		
Date	Tournament	Cat.	Venue	City	Prize money	winner	score	runner-up	winner	score	runner-up
June 1	Swiss Open	Silver	Sporthalle Ruebisbach	(Switzerland) Kloten	€8,000	(Netherlands) Jimmy van Schie	5–3	(England) Darren Johnson	(England) Lisa Ashton	5–3	(Germany) Irina Armstrong
June 2	Helvetia Open	Silver	Sporthalle Ruebisbach	(Switzerland) Kloten	€8,000	(Switzerland) Stefan Bellmont	5–4	(Wales) Mike Gillet	(England) Paula Jacklin	5–2	(England) Lisa Ashton
June 2	Canterbury Open	Bronze	Canterbury & Suburban Darts Assoc.	(New Zealand) Christchurch	NZ$6,525	(Australia) Mal Cuming	5–2	(Australia) Michael Cassar	(New Zealand) Wendy Harper	5–2	(New Zealand) Taylor-Marsh Kahaki
June 2	Australian Masters	Non-ranked	Geelong Darts Club	(Australia) Corio	AU$9,400	(Australia) Brody Klinge	6–2	(Australia) Stuart Coburn	(Australia) Joanne Hadley	4–3	(Australia) Janine Cassar
June 6	Mongolia Open	Bronze	Triple Event Hall	(Mongolia) Ulaanbaatar	₮8,600,000	(India) Nitin Kumar	5–2	(Philippines) Alain Abiabi	(Mongolia) Gantsetseg Erdenebileg	4–2	(Mongolia) Erdenechimeg Dondov
June 7	Ulaanbaatar Open	Bronze	Triple Event Hall	(Mongolia) Ulaanbaatar	₮8,600,000	(Singapore) Paul Lim	5–1	(Hong Kong) Royden Lam	(Japan) Mikuru Suzuki	4–0	(Mongolia) Oyun-Erdene Narantsetseg
June 8	Kassiaru Cup	Non-ranked	Kassiaru Puhkemaja	(Estonia) Vetepere	€600	(Estonia) Raido Kruusvee	6–0	(Estonia) Kotkas	(Estonia) Marilys Hämarmets	bt.	(Estonia) Birgit Jürjens
June 8–9	England National Singles	Silver	North Devon Resort	(England) Ilfracombe	£7,060	(England) Callum Francis	6–4	(England) Dave Ladley	(England) Beau Greaves	6–3	(England) Deta Hedman
June 9	England Open	Silver	North Devon Resort	(England) Ilfracombe	£7,060	(Northern Ireland) Neil Duff	6–3	(England) Callum Francis	(England) Beau Greaves	6–0	(Wales) Rhian O'Sullivan
June 8	WDF Youth Challenge (U18)	Silver	Szent István Hotel	(Hungary) Balatonlelle	n/a	(Hungary) Róbert Vadas	5–4	(Austria) Arthur Schütz	(Germany) Marie Huber	4–2	(Hungary) Hanna Rábaközi
June 8	WDF Youth Challenge (U23)	Silver	Szent István Hotel	(Hungary) Balatonlelle	n/a	(Hungary) Péter Kelemen	5–2	(Republic of Ireland) Adam Dee	(Hungary) Vivien Bokros	bt.	(Hungary) Dorina Sipos
June 9	WDF Youth Challenge (U23)	Non-ranked	Szent István Hotel	(Hungary) Balatonlelle	n/a	(Hungary) András Borbély	bt.	(Hungary) Gergő Farkas	(Hungary) Dorina Sipos	bt.	(Hungary) Vivien Bokros
June 9	Burns Club Centenary Classic	Silver	Burns Club	(Australia) Kambah	AU$8,000	(Australia) Danny Porter	6–5	(Australia) Howard Jones	(Australia) Kym Mitchell	5–2	(Australia) Amanda Loch
June 15	Finnish Open	Bronze	Scandic Helsinki Aviacongress	(Finland) Vantaa	€3,400	(Sweden) Edwin Torbjörnsson	5–1	(Sweden) Viktor Tingström	(Netherlands) Lerena Rietbergen	4–0	(Finland) Sari Sauvola
June 16	Finnish Masters	Bronze	Scandic Helsinki Aviacongress	(Finland) Vantaa	€2,720	(Finland) Kim Viljanen	5–3	(Sweden) Johan Engström	(Netherlands) Lerena Rietbergen	4–0	(Sweden) Maud Jansson
June 22	Cherry Bomb International	Non-ranked	Embassy Suites by Hilton	(United States) Boca Raton	$3,600	(United States) Alex Spellman	6–3	(United States) Leonard Gates	(United States) Paula Murphy	6–1	(United States) Cris Cwalinski
June 22	Balaton Masters	Bronze	Szent István Hotel	(Hungary) Balatonlelle	HUF1,020,000	(Slovenia) Benjamin Pratnemer	5–4	(Czech Republic) Michal Šmejda	(Czech Republic) Jitka Císařová	5–4	(Hungary) Veronika Ihász
June 23	Balaton Classics	Bronze	Szent István Hotel	(Hungary) Balatonlelle	HUF1,020,000	(Romania) Daniel Racoveanu	5–3	(Czech Republic) Michal Šmejda	(Czech Republic) Jitka Císařová	4–3	(Hungary) Veronika Ihász
June 23	New Zealand Open	Gold	Claudelands Arena	(New Zealand) Hamilton	NZ$14,860	(New Zealand) Ben Robb	7–5	(Australia) Danny Porter	(New Zealand) Nicole Regnaud	6–3	(New Zealand) Victoria Monaghan
June 23	German Masters	Non-ranked	RuhrCongress Bochum	(Germany) Bochum	n/a	(Germany) Kai Gotthardt	5–2	(Germany) Luca Jäger	(Germany) Irina Armstrong	5–2	(Germany) Michelle Sossong
June 23	Canadian Open	Non-ranked	Sheraton Saint-Hyacinthe Hôtel	(Canada) Saint-Hyacinthe	C$9,000	(Canada) Matt Campbell	5–4	(Canada) Kevin Adley	(Canada) Pam Hall	4–0	(Canada) Vanessa Abela
June 20–23	Six Nations Cup (S)	Non-ranked	Shearwater Hotel	(Republic of Ireland) Ballinasloe	n/a	(Republic of Ireland) Gerard McGlynn	5–2	(Wales) Terry Nash	(Wales) Rhian O'Sullivan	5–4	(Netherlands) Noa-Lynn van Leuven
June 20–23	Six Nations Cup (T)	Non-ranked	Shearwater Hotel	(Republic of Ireland) Ballinasloe	n/a	Wales	13–9	England	Wales	5–4	England

=== July ===
Date	Tournament	Cat.	Venue	City	Prize money	Men's			Women's		
Date	Tournament	Cat.	Venue	City	Prize money	winner	score	runner-up	winner	score	runner-up
July 10–13	WDF Europe Youth Cup (S)	WDF	Bellevue Park Hotel	(Latvia) Riga	n/a	(England) Jenson Walker	6–3	(Germany) Yorick Hofkens	(Scotland) Sophie McKinlay	5–1	(Italy) Aurora Fochesato
July 10–13	WDF Europe Youth Cup (T)	WDF	Bellevue Park Hotel	(Latvia) Riga	n/a	Ireland	9–7	Netherlands			
July 13	Charlotte Open	Silver	Sheraton Airport Hotel	(United States) Charlotte	$5,250	(United States) Jason Brandon	5–0	(United States) Stephen Phillips	(United States) Paula Murphy	5–1	(United States) Aaja Jalbert
July 20	Bud Brick Memorial	Bronze	Kase Building 158	(Japan) Chiba	¥340,000	(Japan) Tomoya Maruyama	5–0	(Japan) Tasuku Abe	(Japan) Shiori Sato	4–1	(Japan) Mayumi Ouchi
July 21	Japan Open	Silver	Kase Building 158	(Japan) Chiba	¥1,024,000	(Japan) Shusaku Nakamura	5–4	(Netherlands) Carlo van Peer	(Japan) Kosuzu Iwao	5–3	(Japan) Mayumi Ouchi
July 27	Music City Classic	Silver	Sonesta Nashville Airport	(United States) Nashville	$5,260	(United States) Leonard Gates	5–0	(Canada) Brandon Goddard	(United States) Andrea Taylor	5–2	(United States) Robin Curry
July 27	WDF Youth Challenge (U18)	Bronze	Billund Idrætscenter	(Denmark) Billund	n/a	(Denmark) Sebastian Løfgreen	5–3	(Germany) Yorick Hofkens	(Germany) Kira Mertens	4–0	(Denmark) Fraya Gjøl-Nestved
July 27	WDF Youth Challenge (U23)	Non-ranked	Billund Idrætscenter	(Denmark) Billund	n/a	(Republic of Ireland) Adam Dee	4–0	(Germany) Julia Siek	(Germany) Julia Siek	4–0	(Hungary) Dorina Sipos
July 28	WDF Youth Challenge (U23)	Non-ranked	Billund Idrætscenter	(Denmark) Billund	n/a	(Republic of Ireland) Adam Dee	4–1	(Germany) Julia Siek	(Germany) Julia Siek	4–0	(Hungary) Dorina Sipos

=== August ===
Date	Tournament	Cat.	Venue	City	Prize money	Men's			Women's		
Date	Tournament	Cat.	Venue	City	Prize money	winner	score	runner-up	winner	score	runner-up
August 3	Pacific Masters	Silver	Rich River Golf Club	(Australia) Moama	AU$11,200	(Australia) Brandon Weening	6–3	(Australia) Scott Hallett	(Australia) Jules Taylor	5–2	(Australia) Andrea Hendley
August 3	Antwerp Open	Silver	Royal Yacht Club België	(Belgium) Antwerp	€8,000	(Netherlands) Corné Groeneveld	5–2	(England) Cliff Prior	(Netherlands) Lerena Rietbergen	5–1	(Netherlands) Priscilla Steenbergen
August 4	Belgium Open	Silver	Royal Yacht Club België	(Belgium) Antwerp	€8,000	(Netherlands) Wesley Plaisier	5–1	(Belgium) James Vanbesien	(Netherlands) Aileen de Graaf	5–2	(England) Paula Jacklin
August 17	WDF Youth Challenge (U18)	Bronze	Check-Point Darttreff	(Germany) Borken	n/a	(Germany) Florian Preis	4–1	(Netherlands) Kendji Steinbach	(Germany) Kira Mertens	4–1	(Hungary) Krisztina Turai
August 17	WDF Youth Challenge (U23)	Non-ranked	Check-Point Darttreff	(Germany) Borken	n/a	(Austria) Leon Eder	w/o	(Netherlands) Levy Frauenfelder	(Belgium) Emillie D'Hondt	4–1	(Germany) Wibke Riemann
August 17	Swedish Open	Silver	Scandic Triangeln	(Sweden) Malmö	SEK100,000	(Belgium) Xanti Van den Bergh	6–4	(Denmark) Tonni Sørensen	(Netherlands) Aletta Wajer	5–2	(Netherlands) Anca Zijlstra
August 18	Swedish Masters	Silver	Scandic Triangeln	(Sweden) Malmö	SEK100,000	(Denmark) Tonni Sørensen	6–5	(Germany) Liam Maendl-Lawrance	(England) Kirsty Hutchinson	5–3	(Netherlands) Aileen de Graaf
August 24	CDA Open	Bronze	Gillen Club	(Australia) Gillen	AU$1,870	(Australia) Danny Porter	6–4	(Australia) Peter Kudub	No women's draw		
August 25	Eunice Blackmore Memorial	Bronze	Gillen Club	(Australia) Gillen	AU$1,870	(Australia) Danny Porter	6–2	(Australia) Dylan Salmon	No women's draw		
August 31	New Zealand Masters	Silver	Kapi Mana Darts Association	(New Zealand) Porirua	NZ$7,550	(New Zealand) Mark Cleaver	6–4	(New Zealand) Jonny Tata	(New Zealand) Nicole Regnaud	5–0	(New Zealand) Desi Mercer
August 31	Washington Area Open	Silver	The Westin Washington Dulles Airport	(United States) McNair	$4,790	(United States) Leonard Gates	5–1	(United States) Robbie Phillips	(United States) Amanda Farkas	5–1	(United States) Cali West

=== September ===
Date	Tournament	Cat.	Venue	City	Prize money	Men's			Women's		
Date	Tournament	Cat.	Venue	City	Prize money	winner	score	runner-up	winner	score	runner-up
Aug. 30–Sep. 1	Welsh Classic	Silver	Sand Bay Holiday Village	(England) Kewstoke	£7,210	(England) Cliff Prior	5–2	(England) Carl Wilkinson	(England) Beau Greaves	5–3	(Wales) Rhian O'Sullivan
September 1	Welsh Open	Silver	Sand Bay Holiday Village	(England) Kewstoke	£7,210	(Scotland) Andy Davidson	5–1	(England) Matthew Edgar	(England) Beau Greaves	5–4	(Wales) Rhian O'Sullivan
September 6	Blueberry Hill Open	Non-ranked	Blueberry Hill	(United States) University City	$1,500	(United States) Jules van Dongen	3–1	(United States) Bobby Dees Jr.	(United States) Mattilyn Lewis	3–0	(United States) Tasha Nicole
September 7–8	England Masters	Silver	Seal Bay Resort	(England) Selsey	£7,160	(Scotland) Ryan Hogarth	5–4	(England) Reece Colley	(England) Paige Pauling	5–4	(England) Deta Hedman
September 8	England Classic	Silver	Seal Bay Resort	(England) Selsey	£7,160	(England) Jarred Cole	5–3	(Canada) Jeff Smith	(England) Deta Hedman	5–3	(England) Paige Pauling
September 7	Catalonia Open	Bronze	Fábrica Llobet-Gurí	(Catalonia) Calella	€3,400	(Netherlands) Jimmy van Schie	5–3	(Republic of Ireland) Dylan Quinn	(Belgium) Patricia De Peuter	4–0	(Hungary) Gréta Tekauer
September 8	FCD Anniversary Open	Bronze	Fábrica Llobet-Gurí	(Catalonia) Calella	€3,400	(Catalonia) Daniel Zapata	5–2	(Netherlands) Patrick Peters	(Hungary) Gréta Tekauer	4–3	(Netherlands) Priscilla Steenbergen
September 14	Taranaki Open	Silver	Taranaki Darts Association	(New Zealand) New Plymouth	NZ$8,280	(New Zealand) Craig Caldwell	6–3	(New Zealand) Brad Hamill	(New Zealand) Desi Mercer	5–4	(New Zealand) Wendy Harper
September 14	Witch City Open	Silver	Courtyard by Marriott	(United States) Nashua	$6,080	(United States) Leonard Gates	5–0	(United States) Darin Young	(United States) Tracy Feiertag	5–1	(Canada) Trish Grzesik
September 14	Italian Grand Masters	Silver	PlayHall	(Italy) Riccione	€8,000	(Netherlands) Jimmy van Schie	5–1	(Hong Kong) Kai Fan Leung	(Netherlands) Lerena Rietbergen	5–1	(Germany) Irina Armstrong
September 15	Italian Open	Silver	PlayHall	(Italy) Riccione	€8,000	(Belgium) Brian Raman	5–2	(Belgium) Xanti Van den Bergh	(Germany) Irina Armstrong	5–4	(Netherlands) Aletta Wajer
September 14–15	New Brunswick Shediac Open	Bronze	Shédiac Multipurpose Centre	(Canada) Shédiac	C$2,690	(Canada) Clint Clarkson	5–4	(Canada) Kiley Edmunds	(Canada) Maria Carli	4–2	(Canada) Joanne Luke
September 21	Auckland Open	Bronze	West City Darts Association	(New Zealand) Rānui	NZ$3,400	(New Zealand) Deon Toki	5–1	(New Zealand) Caleb Hope	(New Zealand) Mary-Anne Teinaki	5–3	(New Zealand) Olivia Curreen
September 21–22	British Classic	Silver	Bridlington Spa	(England) Bridlington	£7,210	(England) Connor Scutt	5–2	(England) Josh Clough	(England) Beau Greaves	5–2	(Sweden) Vicky Pruim
September 22	British Open	Silver	Bridlington Spa	(England) Bridlington	£7,210	(England) Carl Wilkinson	5–2	(Scotland) Jim McEwan	(England) Beau Greaves	5–0	(England) Lisa Ashton
September 27	Cosmo Malaysian Open	Bronze	Flamingo Hotel by the lake	(Malaysia) Ampang	RM13,850	(Philippines) Ryan Galceran	5–4	(Malaysia) Sairol Mohamed	(Philippines) Janice Hinojales	4–3	(Malaysia) Nur Sazleena Muliyono
September 25–28	WDF Europe Cup (S)	WDF	x-bionic® sphere	(Slovakia) Šamorín	n/a	(Netherlands) Dennie Olde Kalter	7–5	(Republic of Ireland) Adrian Devine	(Republic of Ireland) Robyn Byrne	7–4	(Netherlands) Noa-Lynn van Leuven
September 25–28	WDF Europe Cup (T)	WDF	x-bionic® sphere	(Slovakia) Šamorín	n/a	Sweden	9–7	Czech Republic	Netherlands	9–4	Slovakia
September 29	North Queensland Classic	Silver	Birkdale Sports Club	(Australia) Birkdale	AU$7,760	(Australia) Raymond Smith	5–3	(Australia) Danny Porter	(Australia) Tiarna Smith	5–1	(Australia) Joanne Hadley
September 29	Hungarian Grand Prix	Bronze	Budapest Honvéd Sports Complex	(Hungary) Budapest	HUF1,020,000	(Slovenia) Benjamin Pratnemer	5–3	(Romania) László Kádár	(Scotland) Sophie McKinlay	5–4	(Croatia) Marina Letica

=== October ===
Date	Tournament	Cat.	Venue	City	Prize money	Men's			Women's		
Date	Tournament	Cat.	Venue	City	Prize money	winner	score	runner-up	winner	score	runner-up
October 3–4	Safavi Open	Silver	Rezazade Sports Complex	(Iran) Ardabil	﷼3,144,000	(Iran) Alireza Izadi	5–3	(Iran) Abolfazl Zare	(Iran) Zainab Zare	5–3	(Iran) Elham Nikkhah
October 5	Belfry Open	Silver	Hotelschool Ter Groene Poorte	(Belgium) Bruges	€8,000	(Belgium) Geert De Vos	5–2	(Netherlands) Alexander Merkx	(Netherlands) N-Lynn v Leuven	5–3	(Netherlands) Priscilla Steenbergen
October 6	Bruges Open	Silver	Hotelschool Ter Groene Poorte	(Belgium) Bruges	€8,000	(Netherlands) Jimmy van Schie	5–4	(Netherlands) Corné Groeneveld	(Netherlands) Aileen de Graaf	5–3	(Netherlands) Priscilla Steenbergen
October 11	World Open	Gold	Gerevich Aladár National Sports Hall	(Hungary) Budapest	€19,000	(England) Reece Colley	6–4	(Netherlands) Jimmy van Schie	(England) Beau Greaves	5–0	(Wales) Rhian O'Sullivan
October 9–12	World Masters	Platinum	Gerevich Aladár National Sports Hall	(Hungary) Budapest	€52,000	(Netherlands) Wesley Plaisier	7–3	(Germany) Kai Gotthardt	(England) Beau Greaves	6–0	(Wales) Rhian O'Sullivan
October 13	WDF World Championship Qualifiers; Men's semifinalists (4) and women's finalists (2) qualify for 2024 WDF World Championship	WDF	Gerevich Aladár National Sports Hall	(Hungary) Budapest	n/a	(Northern Ireland) Barry Copeland			(Scotland) Sophie McKinlay		
October 13	WDF World Championship Qualifiers; Men's semifinalists (4) and women's finalists (2) qualify for 2024 WDF World Championship	WDF	Gerevich Aladár National Sports Hall	(Hungary) Budapest	n/a	(Netherlands) Corné Groeneveld			(Finland) Kirsi Viinikainen		
October 13	WDF World Championship Qualifiers; Men's semifinalists (4) and women's finalists (2) qualify for 2024 WDF World Championship	WDF	Gerevich Aladár National Sports Hall	(Hungary) Budapest	n/a	(England) Bradley Kirk					
October 13	WDF World Championship Qualifiers; Men's semifinalists (4) and women's finalists (2) qualify for 2024 WDF World Championship	WDF	Gerevich Aladár National Sports Hall	(Hungary) Budapest	n/a	(United States) Jeff Springer					
October 12	Bunbury Classic	Silver	South West Italian Club	(Australia) Bunbury	AU$7,180	(Australia) Danny Porter	5–2	(Australia) Bailey Marsh	(Australia) Tiarna Smith	5–0	(New Zealand) Desi Mercer
October 13	Pit to Port Classic	Silver	South West Italian Club	(Australia) Bunbury	AU$7,180	(Australia) Peter Machin	5–4	(Australia) Kimberly Lewis	(New Zealand) Desi Mercer	5–4	(Australia) Angela Clarke
October 12–13	Klondike Open	Bronze	River Cree Resort & Casino	(Canada) Enoch	C$4,500	(Canada) Steve Kristjansson	5–2	(Canada) Logan Crooks	(Canada) Maria Carli	5–2	(Canada) Angela Aucoin
October 19	Thunder Bay Open	Bronze	Loyal Order of Moose Lodge	(Canada) Thunder Bay	C$3,000	(Canada) Tyler Nelson	5–3	(Canada) Cory Tkach	(Canada) Roxanne V Tassel	4–2	(Canada) Darlene V Sleeuwen
October 19	Latvia Open	Silver	Bellevue Park Hotel	(Latvia) Riga	€8,000	(Lithuania) Darius Labanauskas	6–2	(Finland) Jonas Masalin	(Netherlands) Anca Zijlstra	5–4	(Netherlands) Lerena Rietbergen
October 20	Riga Open	Bronze	Bellevue Park Hotel	(Latvia) Riga	€4,280	(Finland) Jonas Masalin	6–3	(England) Bradley Kirk	(Netherlands) Anca Zijlstra	5–4	(Sweden) Maud Jansson
October 20	Murray Bridge Classic	Bronze	Murray Bridge Darts Club	(Australia) White Hill	AU$5,000	(Australia) Peter Machin	6–3	(Australia) Karl Schaefer	(Australia) Gemma Leonard	5–3	(Australia) Lyn Morrison
October 26	Alan King Memorial	Bronze	Otago Darts Association	(New Zealand) Dunedin	NZ$4,220	(New Zealand) Kayden Milne	5–1	(New Zealand) Nick Kohey	(New Zealand) Nicole Regnaud	5–4	(New Zealand) Desi Mercer
October 26	Hungarian Classic	Bronze	Budapest Honvéd Sports Complex	(Hungary) Budapest	HUF1,004,000	(Netherlands) Jimmy van Schie	4–1	(Slovenia) Benjamin Pratnemer	(Czech Republic) Jitka Císařová	4–1	(Hungary) Gréta Tekauer
October 27	Hungarian Masters	Bronze	Budapest Honvéd Sports Complex	(Hungary) Budapest	HUF3,251,500	(Slovenia) Benjamin Pratnemer	5–3	(Belgium) Brian Raman	(Scotland) Sophie McKinlay	4–1	(Hungary) Gréta Tekauer
October 27	Victorian Classic	Silver	Mountain Districts Darts Association	(Australia) Dandenong South	AU$7,950	(Australia) Michael Cassar	6–3	(Australia) Brody Klinge	(Australia) Chris Richardson	5–1	(Australia) Kylie Keenan
October 27	Kuching City Open	Bronze	Riverside Shopping Complex	(Malaysia) Kuching	RM8,300	(Malaysia) Mohamad Faizal	4–2	(Malaysia) Faizal Mohamad	(Malaysia) Maisuriyati Zain	3–1	(Malaysia) Zarina Khan
Oct. 30–Nov. 1	WDF Africa Cup (S)	WDF	Ivy Cyrene Island Aqua Park Resort	(Egypt) Sharm El Sheikh	n/a	(Uganda) David Tabaro	7–5	(Bahrain) Basem Mahmood	(Uganda) Sarah Makanga	7–0	(Uganda) Lillian Ama
Oct. 30–Nov. 1	WDF Africa Cup (T)	WDF	Ivy Cyrene Island Aqua Park Resort	(Egypt) Sharm El Sheikh	n/a	Bahrain		Uganda	Uganda		Egypt

=== November ===
Date	Tournament	Cat.	Venue	City	Prize money	Men's			Women's		
Date	Tournament	Cat.	Venue	City	Prize money	winner	score	runner-up	winner	score	runner-up
November 2–3	Egypt Open	Silver	Ivy Cyrene Island Aqua Park Resort	(Egypt) Sharm El Sheikh	$5,300	(Philippines) Alain Abiabi	5–0	(Sweden) Felix Thorin	(Uganda) Sarah Makanga	5–3	(Uganda) Winnie Asuga
November 3	Egypt Masters	Bronze	Ivy Cyrene Island Aqua Park Resort	(Egypt) Sharm El Sheikh	$1,325	(Philippines) Alain Abiabi	5–0	(Uganda) Robert Okalany	(Uganda) Sarah Makanga	4–0	(Hungary) Lilla Szakál
November 2	Malta Masters	Silver	Kirkop Sports Complex	(Malta) Kirkop	€8,000	(Scotland) Andy Davidson	5–2	(England) Darren Johnson	(Netherlands) Kim Palstra	5–2	(Germany) Lisa Zollikofer
November 3	Malta Open	Silver	Kirkop Sports Complex	(Malta) Kirkop	€8,000	(Malta) Norbert Attard	5–2	(Switzerland) Thomas Junghans	(Netherlands) Lerena Rietbergen	5–2	(Germany) Lisa Zollikofer
November 3–6	WDF Asia-Pacific Cup (S)	WDF	Taipei Gymnasium	(Taiwan) Taipei	n/a	(Japan) Mitsuhiko Tatsunami	6–3	(Mongolia) A Myagmarsuren	(Japan) Yukie Sakaguchi	6–1	(South Korea) Kim Ah-reum
November 3–6	WDF Asia-Pacific Cup (T)	WDF	Taipei Gymnasium	(Taiwan) Taipei	n/a	Taiwan	9–3	Mongolia	Japan	9–2	Hong Kong
November 8	Killarney Open	Non-ranked	Gleneagle Hotel	(Republic of Ireland) Killarney	€4,400	(Scotland) Ryan Hogarth	5–4	(Republic of Ireland) Stephen Rosney	(Republic of Ireland) Robyn Byrne	5–2	(England) Paige Pauling
November 9	Irish Classic	Silver	Gleneagle Hotel	(Republic of Ireland) Killarney	€10,900	(Netherlands) Stefan Schroder	5–1	(Netherlands) Alexander Merkx	(Republic of Ireland) Robyn Byrne	5–0	(Netherlands) Priscilla Steenbergen
November 10	Irish Open	Gold	Gleneagle Hotel	(Republic of Ireland) Killarney	€18,400	(Finland) Marko Kantele	6–5	(England) James Beeton	(Scotland) Lorraine Hyde	5–3	(Netherlands) Lerena Rietbergen
November 9	Slovenia Masters	Bronze	Podčetrtek Sports Hall	(Slovenia) Podčetrtek	€1,750	(Austria) Hannes Schnier	bt.	(Slovenia) Denis Duh	(Italy) Aurora Fochesato	bt.	(Slovakia) Nina Stašková
November 10	Slovenia Open	Bronze	Podčetrtek Sports Hall	(Slovenia) Podčetrtek	€1,750	(Slovenia) Benjamin Pratnemer	bt.	(Austria) Hannes Schnier	(Italy) Aurora Fochesato	bt.	(Slovenia) Petra Klemenčič
November 10	Taiwan Open	Bronze	Taipei Gymnasium	(Taiwan) Taipei	NT$84,000	(Taiwan) Pupo Teng Lieh	5–1	(Taiwan) Tseng Chi-jui	(Taiwan) Liao Pei-ying	4–2	(Mongolia) Khulan Bayanmunkh
November 16	Seacoast Open	Silver	DoubleTree by Hilton	(United States) Manchester	$6,300	(United States) Alex Spellman	5–2	(United States) Jim Widmayer	(United States) Tracy Feiertag	5–2	(United States) Cali West
November 17	Ted Clements Memorial	Bronze	Levin Cosmopolitan Club	(New Zealand) Levin	NZ$3,000	(New Zealand) Mark Cleaver	5–1	(New Zealand) Neven Filimoeatu	(New Zealand) Nicole Regnaud	5–4	(New Zealand) Wendy Harper
November 23	Czech Open	Silver	OREA Hotel Pyramida	(Czech Republic) Prague	CZK208,000	(Netherlands) Jimmy van Schie	5–2	(Sweden) Andreas Harrysson	(Finland) Kirsi Viinikainen	5–2	(Czech Republic) Jitka Císařová
November 24	Alice Springs Open	Silver	Gillen Club	(Australia) Gillen	AU$25,510	(Australia) Karl Schaefer	7–4	(Australia) Bailey Marsh	(New Zealand) Nicole Regnaud	6–2	(Australia) Joanne Hadley
November 24	Gibraltar Open	Bronze	George Federico Darts Hall	Gibraltar	£2,500	(United States) Stowe Buntz	5–2	(England) Mark Stephenson	(England) Paige Pauling	4–0	(Mongolia) U Tserenkhand
Nov. 29–Dec. 8	WDF World Darts Championship (S)	Platinum	Lakeside Country Club	(England) Frimley Green	£257,000	(Republic of Ireland) Shane McGuirk	6–3	(Singapore) Paul Lim	(England) Beau Greaves	4–1	(Scotland) Sophie McKinlay
Nov. 29–Dec. 8	WDF World Darts Championship (B/G)	Platinum	Lakeside Country Club	(England) Frimley Green	£12,000	(England) Archie Self	3–2	(England) Jenson Walker	(England) Paige Pauling	2–0	(Scotland) Sophie McKinlay

=== December ===
Date	Tournament	Cat.	Venue	City	Prize money	Men's			Women's		
Date	Tournament	Cat.	Venue	City	Prize money	winner	score	runner-up	winner	score	runner-up
December 15	Xmas Classic	Silver	Birkdale Sports Club	(Australia) Birkdale	AU$7,760	(Australia) Robbie King	5–4	(Australia) Michael Cassar	(Australia) Vanessa James	5–4	(Australia) Janine Cassar

== Statistical information ==
The players/nations are sorted by:

1. Total number of titles;
2. Cumulated importance of those titles;
3. Alphabetical order (by family names for players).

=== Titles won by player (men's) ===
Total	Player	Category			
Total	Player	Platinum	Gold	Silver	Bronze
8	Jimmy van Schie (NED)			● ● ● ● ●	● ● ●
5	Leonard Gates (USA)			● ● ●	● ●
5	Danny Porter (AUS)			● ● ●	● ●
5	Benjamin Pratnemer (SLO)			●	● ● ● ●
3	Ben Robb (NZL)		●		● ●
3	Brandon Weening (AUS)			● ● ●	
3	Edwin Torbjörnsson (SWE)				● ● ●
2	Wesley Plaisier (NED)	●		●	
2	Connor Scutt (ENG)		●	●	
2	Jason Brandon (USA)			● ●	
2	Andy Davidson (SCO)			● ●	
2	Carl Wilkinson (ENG)			● ●	
2	Alain Abiabi (PHI)			●	●
2	Mark Cleaver (NZL)			●	●
2	Darius Labanauskas (LTU)			●	●
2	Peter Machin (AUS)			●	●
2	Sybren Gijbels (BEL)				● ●
2	Björn Lejon (SWE)				● ●
2	Jan McIntosh (FAR)				● ●
2	Kayden Milne (NZL)				● ●
2	Hannes Schnier (AUT)				● ●
1	Jarno Bottenberg (NED)	●			
1	Shane McGuirk (IRE)	●			
1	Reece Colley (ENG)		●		
1	Howard Jones (AUS)		●		
1	Marko Kantele (FIN)		●		
1	Jacob Taylor (CAN)		●		
1	Norbert Attard (MLT)			●	
1	Stefan Bellmont (SUI)			●	
1	Craig Caldwell (NZL)			●	
1	Michael Cassar (AUS)			●	
1	Jarred Cole (ENG)			●	
1	Geert De Vos (BEL)			●	
1	Neil Duff (NIR)			●	
1	Callum Francis (ENG)			●	
1	Hayden Garing (NZL)			●	
1	Corné Groeneveld (NED)			●	
1	Andreas Harrysson (SWE)			●	
1	Ryan Hogarth (SCO)			●	
1	Alireza Izadi (IRI)			●	
1	Robbie King (AUS)			●	
1	Jim McEwan (SCO)			●	
1	Alexander Merkx (NED)			●	
1	Shusaku Nakamura (JPN)			●	
1	Glen Parsons (SCO)			●	
1	Cliff Prior (ENG)			●	
1	Brian Raman (BEL)			●	
1	Gary Robson (ENG)			●	
1	Karl Schaefer (AUS)			●	
1	Stefan Schroder (NED)			●	
1	Jeff Smith (CAN)			●	
1	Raymond Smith (AUS)			●	
1	Tonni Sørensen (DEN)			●	
1	Alex Spellman (USA)			●	
1	Xanti Van den Bergh (BEL)			●	
1	Antony Allen (ENG)				●
1	Moreno Blom (NED)				●
1	Stowe Buntz (USA)				●
1	Clint Clarkson (CAN)				●
1	Mal Cuming (AUS)				●
1	Matt Dickinson (ENG)				●
1	Mohamad Faizal (MYS)				●
1	Ryan Galceran (PHI)				●
1	Rory Hansen (CAN)				●
1	Bradley Kirk (ENG)				●
1	Brody Klinge (AUS)				●
1	Patrik Kovács (HUN)				●
1	Steve Kristjansson (CAN)				●
1	Nitin Kumar (IND)				●
1	Paul Lim (SGP)				●
1	Tomoya Maruyama (JPN)				●
1	Jonas Masalin (FIN)				●
1	Tyler Nelson (CAN)				●
1	Daniel Racoveanu (ROM)				●
1	Brayden Sperling (AUS)				●
1	Pupo Teng Lieh (TAI)				●
1	Deon Toki (NZL)				●
1	Erik van Manen (NED)				●
1	Kim Viljanen (FIN)				●
1	Scott Walters (ENG)				●
1	Daniel Zapata (CAT)				●

=== Titles won by nation (men's) ===
Total	Nation	Category			
Total	Nation	Platinum	Gold	Silver	Bronze
18	Australia (AUS)		●	● ● ● ● ● ● ● ● ● ● ●	● ● ● ● ● ●
16	Netherlands (NED)	● ●		● ● ● ● ● ● ● ● ●	● ● ● ● ●
13	England (ENG)		● ●	● ● ● ● ● ● ●	● ● ● ●
10	New Zealand (NZL)		●	● ● ●	● ● ● ● ● ●
9	United States (USA)			● ● ● ● ● ●	● ● ●
6	Canada (CAN)		●	●	● ● ● ●
6	Sweden (SWE)			●	● ● ● ● ●
5	Scotland (SCO)			● ● ● ● ●	
5	Belgium (BEL)			● ● ●	● ●
5	Slovenia (SLO)			●	● ● ● ●
3	Finland (FIN)		●		● ●
3	Philippines (PHI)			●	● ●
2	Japan (JPN)			●	●
2	Lithuania (LTU)			●	●
2	Austria (AUT)				● ●
2	Faroe Islands (FAR)				● ●
1	Ireland (IRE)	●			
1	Denmark (DEN)			●	
1	Iran (IRI)			●	
1	Malta (MLT)			●	
1	Northern Ireland (NIR)			●	
1	Switzerland (SUI)			●	
1	Catalonia (CAT)				●
1	Hungary (HUN)				●
1	India (IND)				●
1	Malaysia (MYS)				●
1	Romania (ROM)				●
1	Singapore (SGP)				●
1	Taiwan (TAI)				●

=== Titles won by player (women's) ===
Total	Player	Category			
Total	Player	Platinum	Gold	Silver	Bronze
13	Beau Greaves (ENG)	● ● ●	● ● ● ●	● ● ● ● ● ●	
7	Nicole Regnaud (NZL)		●	● ● ●	● ● ●
7	Jitka Císařová (CZE)				● ● ● ● ● ● ●
7	Gréta Tekauer (HUN)				● ● ● ● ● ● ●
5	Lerena Rietbergen (NED)			● ● ●	● ●
4	Wendy Harper (NZL)			●	● ● ●
3	Fallon Sherrock (ENG)		●	● ●	
3	Aileen de Graaf (NED)			● ● ●	
3	Deta Hedman (ENG)			● ● ●	
3	Paige Pauling (ENG)			● ●	●
2	Amanda Loch (AUS)		●		●
2	Tracy Feiertag (USA)			● ●	
2	Joanne Hadley (AUS)			● ●	
2	Desi Mercer (NZL)			● ●	
2	Tiarna Smith (AUS)			● ●	
2	Irina Armstrong (GER)			●	●
2	Sarah Makanga (UGA)			●	●
2	Anca Zijlstra (NED)			●	●
2	Maria Carli (CAN)				● ●
2	Aurora Fochesato (ITA)				● ●
2	Sophie McKinlay (SCO)				● ●
2	Michelle Merlit (DEN)				● ●
1	Lorraine Hyde (SCO)		●		
1	Lisa Ashton (ENG)			●	
1	Robyn Byrne (IRE)			●	
1	Amanda Farkas (USA)			●	
1	Kirsty Hutchinson (ENG)			●	
1	Kosuzu Iwao (JPN)			●	
1	Paula Jacklin (ENG)			●	
1	Vanessa James (AUS)			●	
1	Kym Mitchell (AUS)			●	
1	Paula Murphy (USA)			●	
1	Kim Palstra (NED)			●	
1	Vicky Pruim (SWE)			●	
1	Chris Richardson (AUS)			●	
1	Andrea Taylor (USA)			●	
1	Jules Taylor (AUS)			●	
1	Noa-Lynn van Leuven (NED)			●	
1	Kirsi Viinikainen (FIN)			●	
1	Aletta Wajer (NED)			●	
1	Cali West (USA)			●	
1	Zainab Zare (IRI)			●	
1	Patricia De Peuter (BEL)				●
1	Gantsetseg Erdenebileg (MGL)				●
1	Anna Forsmark (SWE)				●
1	Janice Hinojales (PHI)				●
1	Anna Hlavová (CZE)				●
1	Maud Jansson (SWE)				●
1	Emily Kaufhold (USA)				●
1	Sally Kelly (USA)				●
1	Gemma Leonard (AUS)				●
1	Monique Lessmeister (GER)				●
1	Jackie Marks (AUS)				●
1	Kaitlyn McKinley (USA)				●
1	Liao Pei-ying (TAI)				●
1	Shiori Sato (JPN)				●
1	Mikuru Suzuki (JPN)				●
1	Mary-Anne Teinaki (NZL)				●
1	Roxanne Van Tassel (CAN)				●
1	Evangelia Vidali (GRE)				●
1	Maisuriyati Zain (MYS)				●

=== Titles won by nation (women's) ===
Total	Nation	Category			
Total	Nation	Platinum	Gold	Silver	Bronze
25	England (ENG)	● ● ●	● ● ●	● ● ● ● ● ● ● ● ● ● ● ● ● ● ● ● ● ●	●
14	New Zealand (NZL)		●	● ● ● ● ● ●	● ● ● ● ● ● ●
13	Netherlands (NED)			● ● ● ● ● ● ● ● ● ●	● ● ●
11	Australia (AUS)		●	● ● ● ● ● ● ●	● ● ●
9	United States (USA)			● ● ● ● ● ●	● ● ●
8	Czech Republic (CZE)				● ● ● ● ● ● ● ●
7	Hungary (HUN)				● ● ● ● ● ● ●
3	Scotland (SCO)		●		● ●
3	Germany (GER)			●	● ●
3	Japan (JPN)			●	● ●
3	Sweden (SWE)			●	● ●
3	Canada (CAN)				● ● ●
2	Uganda (UGA)			●	●
2	Denmark (DEN)				● ●
2	Italy (ITA)				● ●
1	Finland (FIN)			●	
1	Iran (IRI)			●	
1	Ireland (IRE)			●	
1	Belgium (BEL)				●
1	Greece (GRE)				●
1	Malaysia (MYS)				●
1	Mongolia (MGL)				●
1	Philippines (PHI)				●
1	Taiwan (TAI)				●
