= 2025 World Darts Championship =

2025 World Darts Championship may refer to:

- 2025 PDC World Darts Championship, also known as the 2024/25 Paddy Power World Darts Championship. Organised by the Professional Darts Corporation (PDC).
- 2025 WDF World Darts Championship, also known as the 2025 WDF Lakeside World Darts Championship. Organised by the World Darts Federation (WDF).
- 2026 PDC World Darts Championship, also known as the 2025/26 Paddy Power World Darts Championship. Organised by the Professional Darts Corporation (PDC).
