= British Open (darts) =

Tournament information
- Location: Various
- Country: England
- Established: 1975
- Organisation(s): WDF Silver category
- Format: Legs
- Prize fund: £17,720 (Total)
- Month(s) Played: September

Current champion(s)
- Mitchell Lawrie (SCO) (men's & youth); Paige Pauling (ENG) (women's & girls')

The British Open is one of the longest-running darts events, having started just a few months after the inaugural Winmau World Masters in 1975. The tournament used to be televised by the BBC from its inception, but it ceased to cover the event after 1983. ITV took over from 1984 to 1988, then BSB Sports Channel/Sky Sports covered from 1990 to 1992. It was often held between Christmas and New Year - the 1975 Championship was actually played in late 1974. The tradition was maintained until near the millennium, when the organisers moved the tournament back to September/October. In recent years the tournament has been televised on Eurosport along with several other BDO tournaments that were previously untelevised.

The tournament's 50th edition was held at Bridlington Spa, Bridlington in 2025. The men's tournament been won by several world champions including: John Lowe, Eric Bristow, Jocky Wilson, Martin Adams, Raymond van Barneveld, Gary Anderson and Luke Littler. The women's tournament has been won by Fallon Sherrock as well as several women's world champions including Trina Gulliver, Anastasia Dobromyslova, Deta Hedman, Lisa Ashton and Beau Greaves.

Mitchell Lawrie (men's & youth) and Paige Pauling (women's & girls') are the current champions, having won the event in 2025.

== List of winners ==
=== Men's ===
Year	Champion	Av.	Score	Runner-Up	Av.	Prize Money			Venue
Year	Champion	Av.	Score	Runner-Up	Av.	Total	Ch.	R.-Up	Venue
1975	(Wales) Alan Evans	n/a	beat	(England) Alan Glazier	n/a	£1,440	£750	£300	Mount Royal Hotel, London
1976	(England) Jack North	n/a	beat	(England) Brian Vaux	n/a	£2,080	£1,000	£400	Mount Royal Hotel, London
1977	(England) John Lowe	n/a	beat	(England) Cliff Lazarenko	n/a	£2,940	£1,000	£500	Mount Royal Hotel, London
1978	(England) Eric Bristow	n/a	3 – 2	(England) John Lowe	n/a	£2,810	£1,000	£500	Mount Royal Hotel, London
1979	(England) Tony Brown	n/a	beat	(England) Brian Langworth	n/a	£3,810	£2,000	£500	Royal Horticultural Halls, London
1980	(England) Cliff Lazarenko	n/a	beat	(England) Ray Cornibert	n/a	£3,810	£2,000	£500	Royal Horticultural Halls, London
1981	(England) Eric Bristow (2)	n/a	beat	(Wales) Leighton Rees	n/a	£5,310	£3,000	£750	Kensington Rainbow, London
1982	(Scotland) Jocky Wilson	n/a	2 – 1	(England) Eric Bristow	n/a	£6,140	£3,000	£1,000	Kensington Rainbow, London
1983	(England) Eric Bristow (3)	n/a	2 – 0	(England) Mike Gregory	n/a	£6,140	£3,000	£1,000	Kensington Rainbow, London
1984	(England) Cliff Lazarenko (2)	n/a	2 – 1	(England) Barry Noble	n/a	£6,140	£3,000	£1,000	Kensington Rainbow, London
1985	(England) John Cosnett	n/a	2 – 1	(Wales) Peter Locke	n/a	£8,420	£4,000	£1,500	Kensington Rainbow, London
1986	(England) Eric Bristow (4)	n/a	2 – 1	(England) John Lowe	n/a	£10,580	£5,000	£2,500	Kensington Rainbow, London
1987	(England) Bob Anderson	n/a	2 – 0	(England) Steve Cusick	n/a	£11,160	£5,000	£2,000	Kensington Rainbow, London
1988	(England) John Lowe (2)	n/a	2 – 0	(England) Bob Anderson	n/a	£11,160	£5,000	£2,000	Kensington Rainbow, London
1989	(Wales) Brian Cairns	n/a	2 – 0	(England) Martin Hurley	n/a	£11,800	£5,000	£2,000	Kensington Rainbow, London
1990	(England) Alan Warriner	n/a	2 – 1	(England) Wayne Jones	n/a	£9,520	£4,000	£2,000	Kensington Rainbow, London
1991	(England) Mike Gregory	n/a	2 – 1	(England) John Lowe	n/a	£9,520	£4,000	£2,000	Royal Horticultural Halls, London
1992	(England) Phil Gilman	n/a	3 – 1	(England) Dennis Priestley	n/a	£7,820	£3,000	£1,500	Ramada Inn West London, London
1993	(England) Dennis Priestley	n/a	beat	(England) Dave Askew	n/a	£7,820	£3,000	£1,500	Earls Court Park Inn International Hotel, London
1994	(England) Martin Adams	n/a	beat	(Sweden) Stefan Nagy	n/a	£6,720	£3,000	£1,000	Earls Court Park Inn International Hotel, London
1995	(Jamaica) Al Hedman	n/a	beat	(England) Andy Fordham	n/a	£6,720	£3,000	£1,000	Earls Court Park Inn International Hotel, London
1996	(Netherlands) Roland Scholten	n/a	beat	(Scotland) Bob Taylor	n/a	£6,560	£3,000	£1,000	Earls Court Park Inn International Hotel, London
1997	(England) Kevin Painter	n/a	beat	(England) Andy Smith	n/a	n/a	n/a	n/a	Paragon Hotel, London
1998	(England) Colin Monk	n/a	beat	(Wales) Ritchie Davies	n/a	n/a	n/a	n/a	Paragon Hotel, London
1999	(Netherlands) Raymond van Barneveld	n/a	beat	(England) Peter Manley	n/a	n/a	n/a	n/a	Paragon Hotel, London
2000	(England) Mervyn King	n/a	beat	(England) Wayne Mardle	n/a	n/a	n/a	n/a	Liverpool
2001	(England) John Walton	n/a	beat	(England) Steve Beaton	n/a	n/a	n/a	n/a	Liverpool
2002	(England) Tony Eccles	n/a	beat	(Australia) Tony David	n/a	£4,980	£2,500	£1,000	Liverpool
2003	(England) Darryl Fitton	n/a	beat	(England) Mervyn King	n/a	£4,980	£2,500	£1,000	Royal Spa, Bridlington
2004	(England) Martin Adams (2)	102.81	2 – 1	(England) Mervyn King	101.07	£6,040	£3,000	£1,000	Royal Spa, Bridlington
2005	(Denmark) Brian Buur	94.41	2 – 0	(Netherlands) Michael van Gerwen	82.77	£6,040	£3,000	£1,000	Royal Spa, Bridlington
2006	(England) Mick Reed	n/a	2 – 0	(Scotland) Mark Barilli	n/a	£6,040	£3,000	£1,000	Royal Spa, Bridlington
2007	(Scotland) Gary Anderson	n/a	2 – 0	(Scotland) John Henderson	n/a	£6,040	£3,000	£1,000	Royal Spa, Bridlington
2008	(Scotland) John Henderson	95.49	4 – 2	(Scotland) Gary Anderson	96.48	£6,040	£3,000	£1,000	Royal Spa, Bridlington
2009	(England) Dave Chisnall	n/a	2 – 0	(England) Martin Atkins	n/a	£6,040	£3,000	£1,000	Royal Spa, Bridlington
2010	(England) Ted Hankey	n/a	3 – 0	(England) Andrew Gilding	n/a	£6,040	£3,000	£1,000	Royal Spa, Bridlington
2011	(England) Scott Waites	97.49	3 – 1	(Netherlands) Willy van de Wiel	93.12	£6,040	£3,000	£1,000	Royal Spa, Bridlington
2012	(England) Martin Atkins	n/a	6 – 5	(England) Robbie Green	n/a	£6,040	£3,000	£1,000	Royal Spa, Bridlington
2013	(England) Garry Thompson	90.66	6 – 5	(England) James Wilson	89.70	£8,000	£3,000	£1,200	Royal Spa, Bridlington
2014	(England) Scott Mitchell	95.64	6 – 1	(Wales) Martin Phillips	81.29	£8,000	£3,000	£1,200	Royal Spa, Bridlington
2015	(England) Mark McGeeney	89.64	6 – 3	(England) Scott Waites	88.29	£12,400	£3,000	£1,500	Royal Spa, Bridlington
2016	(Scotland) Cameron Menzies	n/a	6 – 1	(Netherlands) Richard Veenstra	n/a	£12,400	£3,000	£1,500	Royal Spa, Bridlington
2017	(Scotland) Ross Montgomery	89.12	6 – 5	(Scotland) Cameron Menzies	88.34	£12,400	£3,000	£1,500	Royal Spa, Bridlington
2018	(Netherlands) Richard Veenstra	88.06	6 – 3	(Germany) Michael Unterbuchner	86.83	£12,400	£3,000	£1,500	Royal Spa, Bridlington
2019	(Netherlands) Wesley Harms	89.10	6 – 5	(Wales) Michael Warburton	88.50	£12,400	£3,000	£1,500	Royal Spa, Bridlington
2021	(England) Scott Marsh	92.83	6 – 5	(England) Connor Scutt	88.63	£12,400	£3,000	£1,500	Royal Spa, Bridlington
2022	(England) Reece Colley	91.93	6 – 3	(Netherlands) Chris Landman	91.99	£12,400	£3,000	£1,500	Royal Spa, Bridlington
2023	Luke Littler	85.79	5 – 2	Peter Jacques	78.52	£4,940	£1,500	£700	Royal Spa, Bridlington
2024	Carl Wilkinson	94.89	5 – 2	Jim McEwan	79.26	£5,040	£1,500	£700	Royal Spa, Bridlington
2025	Mitchell Lawrie	102.95	5 – 0	Ryan Hogarth	74.18	£5,040	£1,500	£700	Royal Spa, Bridlington
2026	Graham Usher	87.59	6 – 4	(England) Harrison Leigh	84.14	£5,040	£1,500	£700	

=== Women's ===
Year	Champion	Av.	Score	Runner-Up	Av.	Prize Money			Venue
Year	Champion	Av.	Score	Runner-Up	Av.	Total	Ch.	R.-Up	Venue
1979	(United States) Judy Campbell	n/a	beat	(England) Christie Allen	n/a	n/a	n/a	n/a	Royal Horticultural Halls, London
1980	(England) Linda Batten	n/a	beat	(England) Maureen Flowers	n/a	n/a	n/a	n/a	Royal Horticultural Halls, London
1981	(Wales) Ann-Marie Davies	n/a	beat	(England) Brenda Simpson	n/a	£1,880	£1,000	£300	Kensington Rainbow, London
1982	(England) Maureen Flowers	n/a	beat	(England) Pam Bailey	n/a	£1,880	£1,000	£300	Kensington Rainbow, London
1983	(England) Sandy Earnshaw	n/a	beat	(England) Kathy Wones	n/a	£1,880	£1,000	£300	Kensington Rainbow, London
1984	(Wales) Ann-Marie Davies (2)	n/a	beat	(England) Gwen Sutton	n/a	£2,360	£1,000	£500	Kensington Rainbow, London
1985	(England) Linda Batten (2)	n/a	beat	(England) Maureen Flowers	n/a	£2,360	£1,000	£500	Kensington Rainbow, London
1986	(England) Gwen Sutton	n/a	beat	(England) Sharon Colclough	n/a	£2,360	£1,000	£500	Kensington Rainbow, London
1987	(England) Sharon Colclough	n/a	beat	(England) Gwen Sutton	n/a	£2,360	£1,000	£500	Kensington Rainbow, London
1988	(England) Jane Stubbs	n/a	beat	(England) Sharon Colclough	n/a	£2,360	£1,000	£500	Kensington Rainbow, London
1989	(Scotland) Cathie McCulloch	n/a	beat	(England) Elsie Halligan	n/a	£2,360	£1,000	£500	Kensington Rainbow, London
1990	(England) Sharon Colclough (2)	n/a	beat	(Scotland) Sandra Muir	n/a	£2,360	£1,000	£500	Kensington Rainbow, London
1991	(England) Pauline Dyer	n/a	beat	(Netherlands) Francis Hoenselaar	n/a	£2,360	£1,000	£500	Royal Horticultural Halls, London
1992	(Wales) Sandra Greatbatch	n/a	beat	(England) Mandy Solomons	n/a	£2,360	£1,000	£500	Ramada Inn West London, London
1993	(Wales) Sandra Greatbatch (2)	n/a	beat	(Wales) Leeanne Maddock	n/a	£2,360	£1,000	£500	Earls Court Park Inn International Hotel, London
1994	(Wales) Sandra Greatbatch (3)	n/a	beat	(England) Sue Talbot	n/a	£2,360	£1,000	£500	Earls Court Park Inn International Hotel, London
1995	(Netherlands) Francis Hoenselaar	n/a	beat	(England) Pauline Dyer	n/a	£2,360	£1,000	£500	Earls Court Park Inn International Hotel, London
1996	(England) Pauline Dyer (2)	n/a	beat	(England) Deta Hedman	n/a	£2,360	£1,000	£500	Earls Court Park Inn International Hotel, London
1997	(Netherlands) Francis Hoenselaar (2)	n/a	beat	(England) Deta Hedman	n/a	n/a	n/a	n/a	Paragon Hotel, London
1998	(England) Trina Gulliver	n/a	beat	(England) Mandy Solomons	n/a	n/a	n/a	n/a	Paragon Hotel, London
1999	(England) Trina Gulliver (2)	n/a	beat	(England) Tricia Wright	n/a	n/a	n/a	n/a	Paragon Hotel, London
2000	(England) Trina Gulliver (3)	n/a	beat	(Scotland) Anne Kirk	n/a	n/a	n/a	n/a	Liverpool
2001	(England) Trina Gulliver (4)	n/a	beat	(Scotland) Anne Kirk	n/a	n/a	n/a	n/a	Liverpool
2002	(Netherlands) Mieke de Boer	n/a	beat	(England) Trina Gulliver	n/a	n/a	n/a	n/a	Liverpool
2003	(Netherlands) Francis Hoenselaar (3)	n/a	beat	(England) Trina Gulliver	n/a	n/a	n/a	n/a	Royal Spa, Bridlington
2004	(England) Trina Gulliver (5)	n/a	beat	(Netherlands) Francis Hoenselaar	n/a	n/a	n/a	n/a	Royal Spa, Bridlington
2005	(England) Clare Bywaters	n/a	beat	(Russia) Anastasia Dobromyslova	n/a	n/a	n/a	n/a	Royal Spa, Bridlington
2006	(Russia) Anastasia Dobromyslova	n/a	beat	(Netherlands) Francis Hoenselaar	n/a	n/a	n/a	n/a	Royal Spa, Bridlington
2007	(Russia) Anastasia Dobromyslova (2)	n/a	beat	(England) Dee Bateman	n/a	n/a	n/a	n/a	Royal Spa, Bridlington
2008	(England) Trina Gulliver (6)	n/a	beat	(Netherlands) Francis Hoenselaar	n/a	n/a	n/a	n/a	Royal Spa, Bridlington
2009	(England) Deta Hedman	n/a	beat	(England) Trina Gulliver	n/a	n/a	n/a	n/a	Royal Spa, Bridlington
2010	(England) Trina Gulliver (7)	n/a	3 – 2	(England) Deta Hedman	n/a	n/a	n/a	n/a	Royal Spa, Bridlington
2011	(England) Lorraine Farlam	n/a	3 – 0	(England) Trina Gulliver	n/a	n/a	n/a	n/a	Royal Spa, Bridlington
2012	(England) Linda Ithurralde	n/a	4 – 3	(Norway) Tamara Schuur	n/a	n/a	n/a	n/a	Royal Spa, Bridlington
2013	(England) Deta Hedman (2)	n/a	5 – 3	(England) Trina Gulliver	n/a	n/a	n/a	n/a	Royal Spa, Bridlington
2014	(England) Deta Hedman (3)	n/a	6 – 1	(England) Lorraine Farlam	n/a	n/a	n/a	n/a	Royal Spa, Bridlington
2015	(England) Deta Hedman (4)	n/a	5 – 1	(England) Lisa Ashton	n/a	n/a	n/a	n/a	Royal Spa, Bridlington
2016	(England) Deta Hedman (5)	n/a	5 – 4	(England) Lisa Ashton	n/a	n/a	n/a	n/a	Royal Spa, Bridlington
2017	(Australia) Corrine Hammond	n/a	5 – 3	(Russia) Anastasia Dobromyslova	n/a	n/a	n/a	n/a	Royal Spa, Bridlington
2018	(England) Lisa Ashton	n/a	5 – 1	(England) Fallon Sherrock	n/a	£2,360	£1,000	£400	Royal Spa, Bridlington
2019	(England) Lisa Ashton (2)	n/a	5 – 2	(England) Beau Greaves	n/a	£2,360	£1,000	£400	Royal Spa, Bridlington
2021	(England) Fallon Sherrock	79.73	5 – 2	(Australia) Corrine Hammond	70.62	£5,320	£1,500	£750	Royal Spa, Bridlington
2022	(England) Lisa Ashton (3)	75.38	5 – 1	(Netherlands) Aileen de Graaf	71.59	£5,320	£1,500	£750	Royal Spa, Bridlington
2023	(Wales) Eve Watson	71.54	5 – 1	(England) Paige Pauling	63.13	£2,170	£750	£350	Royal Spa, Bridlington
2024	Beau Greaves	95.13	5 – 0	Lisa Ashton	80.36	£2,170	£750	£350	Royal Spa, Bridlington
2025	Paige Pauling	69.43	5 – 2	Macy Gibbons	70.32	£2,170	£750	£350	Royal Spa, Bridlington

=== Youth's ===
Year	Champion	Av.	Score	Runner-up	Av.	Venue
2018	(England) Leighton Bennett	n/a	4 – 3	(Republic of Ireland) Keane Barry	n/a	Bridlington Spa, Bridlington
2019	(Wales) Taylor Smoldon	n/a	4 – 2	(Scotland) Nathan Girvan	n/a	Bridlington Spa, Bridlington

== Tournament records ==
- Most wins 4: (England) Eric Bristow.
- Most Finals 5: (England) Eric Bristow, (England) John Lowe.
- Most Semi Finals 6: (England) Eric Bristow, (England) John Lowe.
- Most Quarter Finals 11: (England) Martin Adams.
- Most Appearances 13: (England) Martin Adams.
- Most Prize Money won £13,500: (England) Eric Bristow.
- Best winning average (102.95) : (Scotland) Mitchell Lawrie vs (Scotland) Ryan Hogarth, 2025, Final.
- Youngest Winner age 14: (Scotland) Mitchell Lawrie.
- Oldest Winner age 54: (Scotland) Ross Montgomery.

== See also ==
- List of BDO ranked tournaments
- List of WDF tournaments
