= Dartslive The World =

Series of soft-tip darts tournaments

DARTSLIVE The World (stylized as THE WORLD) is a series of soft-tip darts tournaments held annually in various venues around the world since 1985.

== Overview ==
The World is a tournament series organized by Japanese soft-tip darts company Dartslive. It is also referenced as the Soft-Tip World Championship, although several other organisations have held tournaments with that name. Typically, a season consists of five to nine tournaments, called stages, which are broadcast via dartslive.tv. Usually, one stage is held in Europe and North America each, with the other tournaments set throughout East Asia. An annual ranking is composed of stage results during the season. In 2011–13, 2016, and 2018, a Grand Final has been held at the end of the year, with players being invited according to their ranking position, as well as, since 2016, a wild card tournament.

The World stages are open to both men and women, with a special award being given to the best female player at every event, the only exception being the 2016 (unranked) Premium Stage, where a separate women's event was staged. Matches are played in the formats 701-Master Out and Cricket.

The most recent Grand Final champion is Royden Lam, whereas the 2019 annual ranking has been won by Boris Krcmar. Previous seasons have been won by Ronald L. Briones (2011), Lourence Ilagan (2012), Paul Lim (2013, 2016–17), and Krcmar (2014–15, 2018).

The four best-placed players in the ranking are invited to the biannual Super Darts event in Japan

Grand Final champion Lim has been invited to the 2013 PDC World Darts Championship as part of a partnership between Dartslive and the Professional Darts Corporation. Lim also qualified to the 2014 PDC Worlds through the annual ranking.

Two steel tip World Champions have also won stages at The World: three-time World Champion John Part, and 2014 BDO World Champion Stephen Bunting. Many other PDC and BDO players have participated in The World events.

The 2019 stage in Hong Kong had been cancelled due to the 2019-20 Hong Kong protests.

Dartslive announced that in 2020, for the first time a stage would be held in Spain. However, due to the COVID-19 pandemic, the 2020 season was cancelled in its entirety.

Once travel and visitation restrictions were lifted in Japan in August 2022, DARTSLIVE announced a Premium Stage to be held later that month in Tokyo, and soon after a second premium stage to be held in Singapore at the end of November.

For 2023 DARTSLIVE announced there would be three events under ”The World” banner, but as stand alone events rather than having an annual ranking. The first stage was announced to be played on June 11, 2023, in Taichung, Taiwan. The second stage was announced to be in Tokyo, Japan on August 19, 2023. The third stage was announced to take place in Malaysia on October 22, 2023. On March 22, 2023, it was announced that SUPERDARTS 2024 would include 4 “The World” stage winners from 2023, hinting at a possible 4th stage for 2023 or the possibility of the Japan stage once again having a separate men’s and women’s stage.

For the 2024 season, “The World” stages were replaced with qualifiers for DARTSLIVE Superdarts 2025, and were held at “DARTSLIVE Open” events across various countries. Additional qualifiers have been announced for 2025 which reflects that these qualifiers could replace “The World” stages for the foreseeable future.

== List of stage finals ==
Year	Stage	Champion	Runner-Up	Prize Money			Location
Year	Stage	Champion	Runner-Up	Total	Ch.	R.-Up	Location
2011	1	(Philippines) Lourence Ilagan	(Philippines) Jaypee Detablan	N/A	HKD 100,000	HKD 30,000	Hong Kong
2011	2	(Canada) John Part	(Philippines) Ronald L. Briones	N/A	HKD 100,000	HKD 30,000	Hong Kong
2011	3	(Hong Kong) Royden Lam	(Philippines) Lourence Ilagan	N/A	HKD 100,000	HKD 30,000	Hong Kong
2011	4	(Philippines) Ronald L. Briones	(United States) Randy van Deursen	N/A	HKD 100,000	HKD 30,000	Hong Kong
2011	5	(United States) Ray Carver	(Malaysia) Amin Abdul Ghani	N/A	HKD 100,000	HKD 30,000	Hong Kong
2011	6	(Singapore) Paul Lim	(United States) Benjamin Dersch	N/A	HKD 100,000	HKD 30,000	Hong Kong
2011	7	(United States) Ray Carver	(Thailand) Watanyu Charoonroj	N/A	HKD 100,000	HKD 30,000	Hong Kong
2011	8	(United States) David Fatum	(United States) John Kuczynski	N/A	HKD 100,000	HKD 30,000	Hong Kong
2011	Grand Final	(Singapore) Paul Lim	(Japan) Sho Katsumi	HKD 1,900,000	HKD 1,000,000	HKD 300,000	Hong Kong
2012	1	(Singapore) Paul Lim	(United States) Scott Kirchner	HKD 200,000	HKD 100,000	HKD 32,000	Hong Kong
2012	2	(Japan) Sho Katsumi	(Philippines) Ronald L. Briones	HKD 200,000	HKD 100,000	HKD 32,000	Hong Kong
2012	3	(Japan) Keita Ono	(Philippines) Lourence Ilagan	HKD 200,000	HKD 100,000	HKD 32,000	Hong Kong
2012	4	(Hong Kong) Royden Lam	(Japan) Haruki Muramatsu	HKD 200,000	HKD 100,000	HKD 32,000	Hong Kong
2012	5	(Philippines) Lourence Ilagan	(Singapore) Paul Lim	HKD 200,000	HKD 100,000	HKD 32,000	Hong Kong
2012	6	(Hong Kong) Royden Lam	(Singapore) Paul Lim	HKD 200,000	HKD 100,000	HKD 32,000	Hong Kong
2012	7	(Philippines) Lourence Ilagan	(United States) Scott Miller	HKD 200,000	HKD 100,000	HKD 32,000	Las Vegas
2012	8	(United States) Ray Carver	(Singapore) Paul Lim	HKD 200,000	HKD 100,000	HKD 32,000	Hong Kong
2012	Grand Final	(Japan) Takehiro Suzuki	(Philippines) Christian Perez	HKD 2,284,000	HKD 1,000,000	HKD 300,000	Hong Kong
2013	1	(Philippines) Ronald L. Briones	(Japan) Takehiro Suzuki	HKD 200,000	HKD 100,000	HKD 32,000	Hong Kong
2013	2	(United States) Scott Kirchner	(Singapore) Paul Lim	HKD 200,000	HKD 100,000	HKD 32,000	Hong Kong
2013	3	(England) Stephen Bunting	(United States) Benjamin Dersch	HKD 200,000	HKD 100,000	HKD 32,000	France
2013	4	(Philippines) Ronald L. Briones	(United States) Ray Carver	HKD 200,000	HKD 100,000	HKD 32,000	Korea
2013	5	(Philippines) Lourence Ilagan	(Singapore) Paul Lim	HKD 200,000	HKD 100,000	HKD 32,000	China
2013	6	(Philippines) Lourence Ilagan	(Japan) Yuri Eguchi	HKD 200,000	HKD 100,000	HKD 32,000	Las Vegas
2013	7	(Philippines) Christian Perez	(Philippines) Lourence Ilagan	HKD 200,000	HKD 100,000	HKD 32,000	Hong Kong
2013	8	(England) Stephen Bunting	(Hong Kong) Royden Lam	HKD 200,000	HKD 100,000	HKD 32,000	Hong Kong
2013	Grand Final	(Philippines) Lourence Ilagan	(Philippines) Christian Perez	HKD 2,316,000	HKD 1,000,000	HKD 300,000	Hong Kong
2014	1	(England) Adrian Gray	(Japan) Yuri Eguchi	$55,400	$15,000	$6,000	Macau
2014	2	(Japan) Haruki Muramatsu	(Canada) Shaun Narain	$55,400	$15,000	$6,000	France
2014	3	(Croatia) Boris Krcmar	(Canada) Shaun Narain	$55,400	$15,000	$6,000	China
2014	4	(United States) Darin Young	(Japan) Shintao Inoue	$55,400	$15,000	$6,000	Japan
2014	5	(Croatia) Boris Krcmar	(United States) Darin Young	$55,400	$15,000	$6,000	Las Vegas
2015	1	(Philippines) Lourence Ilagan	(South Korea) Hyungchul Park	$33,600	$10,000	$5,000	Macau
2015	2	(England) Adrian Gray	(South Korea) Hyungchul Park	$33,600	$10,000	$5,000	Singapore
2015	3	(United States) Leonard Gates	(Singapore) Paul Lim	$33,600	$10,000	$5,000	France
2015	4	(Japan) Sho Katsumi	(Canada) Jeremiah Millar	$33,600	$10,000	$5,000	Canada
2015	5	(Japan) Shintaro Inoue	(Malaysia) Norhisame	$33,600	$10,000	$5,000	Malaysia
2015	6	(United States) Randy van Deursen	(Croatia) Boris Krcmar	$33,600	$10,000	$5,000	China
2015	7	(Croatia) Boris Krcmar	(Japan) Kenichi Ajiki	$33,600	$10,000	$5,000	Taipeh
2016	1	(Croatia) Boris Krcmar	(South Korea) Hyungchul Park	$31,400	$12,000	$5,000	Las Vegas
2016	2	(United States) Alex Reyes	(United States) Leonard Gates	$31,400	$12,000	$5,000	France
2016	3	(Singapore) Paul Lim	(Japan) Mitsumasa Hoshino	$31,400	$12,000	$5,000	Taipeh
2016	Premium Stage (Men)	(Japan) Keita Ono	(Croatia) Boris Krcmar	N/A	N/A	N/A	Japan
2016	Premium Stage (Women)	(Japan) Mana Kawakami	(Japan) Sayuri Nishiguchi	N/A	N/A	N/A	Japan
2016	4	(Singapore) Paul Lim	(Croatia) Boris Krcmar	$31,400	$12,000	$5,000	South Korea
2016	5	(Malaysia) Tengku Shah	(Taiwan) Howei Tsai	$31,400	$12,000	$5,000	Malaysia
2016	Grand Final	(Croatia) Boris Krcmar	(South Korea) Hyungchul Park	$122,000	$50,000	$20,000	Hong Kong
2017	1	(United States) Alex Reyes	(Singapore) Harith Lim	$36,200	$15,000	$6,000	Las Vegas
2017	2	(Singapore) Paul Lim	(Belgium) Francis Emonts	$36,200	$15,000	$6,000	France
2017	3	(Philippines) Prussian Arceno	(Japan) Kenichi Ajiki	$36,200	$15,000	$6,000	Taichung
2017	4	(United States) Leonard Gates	(Philippines) Lourence Ilagan	$36,200	$15,000	$6,000	Japan
2017	5	(United States) Chris Lim	(Croatia) Boris Krcmar	$36,200	$15,000	$6,000	Malaysia
2017	6	(Singapore) Paul Lim	(United States) Alex Reyes	$36,200	$15,000	$6,000	Hong Kong
2018	1	(United States) Leonard Gates	(Singapore) Paul Lim	$36,200	$15,000	$6,000	Las Vegas
2018	2	(Croatia) Boris Krcmar	(Hong Kong) Royden Lam	$36,200	$15,000	$6,000	France
2018	3	(Croatia) Boris Krcmar	(Singapore) Paul Lim	$36,200	$15,000	$6,000	Japan
2018	4	(Philippines) Lourence Ilagan	(Hong Kong) Royden Lam	$36,200	$15,000	$6,000	Taichung
2018	5	(Croatia) Boris Krcmar	(Hong Kong) Royden Lam	$36,200	$15,000	$6,000	Malaysia
2018	Grand Final	(Hong Kong) Royden Lam	(Croatia) Boris Krcmar	$62,000	$30,000	$10,000	Hong Kong
2019	1	(Hong Kong) Royden Lam	(England) Owen Williams	$36,200	$15,000	$6,000	France
2019	2	(Croatia) OWEN WILLIAMS	(Austria) Michael Rasztovits	$36,200	$15,000	$6,000	France
2019	3	(Singapore) Paul Lim	(Hong Kong) James Law	$36,200	$15,000	$6,000	Japan
2019	4	(Hong Kong) Kai Fan Leung	(Japan) M Tatsunami	$36,200	$15,000	$6,000	Taichung
2022	1 (Men)	(Japan) Jun Matsuda	(Japan) Toru Suzuki		¥1,200,000	¥600,000	Tokyo, Japan
2022	1 (Women)	(Japan) Kosuzu Iwao	(Japan) Natsumi Iwata		¥600,000	¥300,000	Tokyo, Japan
2022	2	(Japan) Keita Ono	(Croatia) Boris Krcmar	$22,200	$10,000	$4,000	Singapore
2023	1	(Japan) Tetsuya Fujiwara	(Japan) Seigo Asada	$22,200	$10,000	$4,000	Taiwan
2023	2 (Men)	(Japan) Teppei Nishi	(Japan) Susumu Kasuya	$22,200	$10,000	$4,000	Tokyo, Japan
2023	2 (Women)	(Japan) Natsumi Iwata	(Japan) Miyu Miyawaki	$14,600	$5,000	$2,000	Tokyo, Japan
2023	3	(Japan) Tomoya Goto	(Japan) Yuta Hayashi	$22,200	$10,000	$4,000	Kuala Lumpur, Malaysia
2026	1	(United States) Chris Lim	(South Korea) Minseok Choi	$22,200	$10,000	$4,000	Kuala Lumpur, Malaysia
2026	2	(Japan) Yuta Hayashi	(Croatia) Boris Krcmar	$22,200	$10,000	$4,000	Taichung
2026	3	(Scotland) Mitchell Lawrie	(Japan) Harkui Muramatsu	$22,200	$10,000	$4,000	Tokyo, Japan

== Records and statistics ==
As of 27 November 2022.

(Players with minimum two The World stage titles)

Rank	Player	Nationality	Won	Runner-up	Finals
1	Boris Krcmar	Croatia	9	8	17
2	Paul Lim	Singapore	8	8	16
3	Lourence Ilagan	Philippines	8	4	12
4	Royden Lam	Hong Kong	5	4	9
5	Ronald Briones	Philippines	3	2	5
6	Leonard Gates	United States	3	1	4
6	Ray Carver	United States	3	1	4
8	Keita Ono	Japan	3	1	4
9	Sho Katsumi	Japan	2	1	3
9	Alex Reyes	United States	2	1	3
11
11	Stephen Bunting	England	2	0	2
11	Adrian Gray	England	2	0	2
