= 2026 Dutch Darts Championship =

Tournament information
- Dates: 16–18 October 2026
- Venue: MECC Maastricht
- Location: Maastricht, Netherlands
- Organisation(s): Professional Darts Corporation (PDC)
- Format: Legs
- Prize fund: £230,000
- Winner's share: £35,000
- High checkout: 164 Martin Schindler

Champion(s)
- Niels Zonneveld (NED)

The 2026 Dutch Darts Championship was a professional darts tournament that took place at the MECC Maastricht in Maastricht, from 16 to 18 October 2026. It was the first time Maastricht has hosted the Dutch Darts Championship since 2018, and was the fifteenth and final PDC European Tour event on the 2026 PDC Pro Tour. It featured a field of 48 players and £230,000 in prize money, with £35,000 going to the winner.

Jonny Clayton was the defending champion, having defeated Niko Springer 8–6 in the 2025 final. However, he lost 6–1 to Damon Heta in the second round.

During the event, Gian van Veen broke the record for the highest ever three-dart average on the European Tour, previously held by Dave Chisnall at the 2018 German Darts Championship, averaging 120.24 in his 6–0 win over Sebastian Białecki in the second round.

Niels Zonneveld won his first European Tour title, defeating Danny Noppert 8–5 in the final.

== Prize money ==
As part of a mass boost in prize money for Professional Darts Corporation (PDC) events in 2026, the prize fund for all 2026 European Tour events rose to £230,000, of which the winner received £35,000.

Stage (num. of players)		Prize money
Winner	(1)	£35,000
Runner-up	(1)	£15,000
Semi-finalists	(2)	£10,000
Quarter-finalists	(4)	£8,000
Third round losers	(8)	£5,000
Second round losers	(16)	£3,500*
First round losers	(16)	£2,000*
Total	£230,000	

- Pre-qualified players from the Orders of Merit who lose in their first match of the event shall not be credited with prize money on any Order of Merit.

== Qualification and format ==
The top 16 players on the two-year PDC Order of Merit were seeded and entered the tournament in the second round, while the next 16 highest-ranked players from the one-year PDC Pro Tour Order of Merit automatically qualified for the first round. The seedings were confirmed on 17 September. The remaining 16 places went to players from four qualifying events – 10 from the Tour Card Holder Qualifier (held on 24 September), four from the Host Nation Qualifier (held on 15 October), one from the Nordic & Baltic Associate Member Qualifier (held on 8 August), and one from the East European Associate Member Qualifier (held on 9 August).

Luke Littler, Josh Rock and Gary Anderson didn't enter the event.

In addition, before the Tour Card Holder Qualifier, James Wade and Kevin Doets withdrew and were replaced by Karel Sedláček and Jeffrey de Graaf. Martin Schindler and Krzysztof Ratajski moved up to become the 14th and 15th seeds respectively.

Luke Humphries and Joe Cullen withdrew and were replaced by Mike De Decker and Daryl Gurney. After the draw was made, Rob Cross withdrew from the tournament. Brendan Dolan replaced him from the reserve list, going straight in at the second-round stage.

Seeded players

1. Gian van Veen (NED) (semi-finals)
2. Gerwyn Price (WAL) (third round)
3. Jonny Clayton (WAL) (second round)
4. Michael van Gerwen (NED) (second round)
5. Danny Noppert (NED) (runner-up)
6. Stephen Bunting (ENG) (semi-finals)
7. Wessel Nijman (NED) (quarter-finals)
8. Ryan Searle (ENG) (quarter-finals)
9. Ross Smith (ENG) (third round)
10. Chris Dobey (ENG) (second round)
11. Nathan Aspinall (ENG) (third round)
12. Jermaine Wattimena (NED) (third round)
13. Luke Woodhouse (ENG) (quarter-finals)
14. Martin Schindler (GER) (third round)
15. Krzysztof Ratajski (POL) (second round)
16. ~~Rob Cross (ENG)~~ (withdrew)

PDC Pro Tour Order of Merit qualifiers
- Andrew Gilding (ENG) (second round)
- Niko Springer (GER) (first round)
- William O’Connor (IRL) (third round)
- Damon Heta (AUS) (quarter-finals)
- Ryan Joyce (ENG) (second round)
- Dirk van Duijvenbode (NED) (second round)
- Niels Zonneveld (NED) (champion)
- Cameron Menzies (SCO) (second round)
- Dave Chisnall (ENG) (second round)
- Kim Huybrechts (BEL) (first round)
- Sebastian Białecki (POL) (second round)
- Cristo Reyes (ESP) (third round)
- Karel Sedláček (CZE) (second round)
- Jeffrey de Graaf (SWE) (second round)

Tour Card qualifier
- Scott Williams (ENG) (second round)
- Max Hopp (GER) (first round)
- Ricardo Pietreczko (GER) (first round)
- Michael Smith (ENG) (second round)
- Nick Kenny (WAL) (first round)
- Callan Rydz (ENG) (first round)
- Stephen Burton (ENG) (first round)
- James Hurrell (ENG) (first round)
- Mickey Mansell (IRL) (first round)
- Owen Bates (ENG) (first round)
Host Nation qualifier
- Jimmy van Schie (NED) (second round)
- Heine Uuldriks (NED) (second round)
- Richard Veenstra (NED) (first round)
- Maikel Verberk (NED) (first round)
Nordic & Baltic qualifier
- Jonas Masalin (FIN) (first round)
East European qualifier
- Krzysztof Kciuk (POL) (first round)
Reserve list
- Mike De Decker (BEL) (first round)
- Daryl Gurney (NIR) (first round)
- Brendan Dolan (IRL) (third round)

== Draw ==
The draw was announced on 15th October. Numbers to the left of a player's name show the seedings for the top 16 in the tournament. The figures to the right of a player's name state their three-dart average in a match. Players in bold denote match winners. The three reserve players are indicated by 'Alt'.

**First round** (best of 11 legs); 16 October
**Sebastian Białecki 96.06**	**6**
Alt	Daryl Gurney 85.03	4
Ricardo Pietreczko 101.74	5
**(Netherlands) Heine Uuldriks 98.00**	**6**
**Dirk van Duijvenbode 94.24**	**6**
James Hurrell 85.95	1
**Ryan Joyce 95.94**	**6**
Owen Bates 80.47	0
**William O'Connor 89.56**	**6**
Richard Veenstra 87.69	2
**Andrew Gilding 87.78**	**6**
Max Hopp 89.69	5
**Dave Chisnall 90.83**	**6**
Jonas Masalin 81.63	4
Kim Huybrechts 96.61	5
**Jimmy van Schie 92.63**	**6**
Niko Springer 94.04	5
**Scott Williams 96.23**	**6**
**Niels Zonneveld 98.51**	**6**
Alt	Mike De Decker 92.40	4
**Jeffrey de Graaf 100.12**	**6**
Mickey Mansell 94.14	3
**Cristo Reyes 95.80**	**6**
Krzysztof Kciuk 86.36	2
**Damon Heta 92.46**	**6**
(Netherlands) Maikel Verberk 84.37	4
**Karel Sedláček 90.81**	**6**
Callan Rydz 85.31	4
**Cameron Menzies 87.43**	**6**
Nick Kenny 78.78	1
**Michael Smith 88.89**	**6**
Stephen Burton 92.89	5

**Second round** (best of 11 legs); 17 October
**1**	**Gian van Veen 120.24**	**6**
Sebastian Białecki 82.54	0
**Alt**	**Brendan Dolan 93.46**	**6**
(Netherlands) Heine Uuldriks 88.31	4
**8**	**Ryan Searle 97.96**	**6**
Dirk van Duijvenbode 96.42	5
**9**	**Ross Smith 101.55**	**6**
Ryan Joyce 80.95	2
4	Michael van Gerwen 99.27	5
**William O'Connor 101.83**	**6**
**13**	**Luke Woodhouse 87.18**	**6**
Andrew Gilding 80.34	1
**5**	**Danny Noppert 100.84**	**6**
Dave Chisnall 95.50	4
**12**	**Jermaine Wattimena 90.09**	**6**
Jimmy van Schie 88.31	2
**2**	**Gerwyn Price 97.14**	**6**
Scott Williams 86.01	3
15	Krzysztof Ratajski 88.61	5
**Niels Zonneveld 96.77**	**6**
**7**	**Wessel Nijman 88.24**	**6**
Jeffrey de Graaf 87.21	3
10	Chris Dobey 99.49	2
**Cristo Reyes 110.26**	**6**
3	Jonny Clayton 98.39	1
**Damon Heta 103.57**	**6**
**14**	**Martin Schindler 92.24**	**6**
Karel Sedláček 96.39	4
**6**	**Stephen Bunting 92.70**	**6**
Cameron Menzies 80.72	2
**11**	**Nathan Aspinall 102.45**	**6**
Michael Smith 91.06	1

**Third round** (best of 11 legs); 18 October
**1**	**van Veen 96.72**	**6**
Alt	Dolan 86.35	1
**8**	**Searle 92.70**	**6**
9	R Smith 91.14	4
O'Connor 94.20	4
**13**	**Woodhouse 98.01**	**6**
**5**	**Noppert 100.44**	**6**
12	Wattimena 99.18	3
2	Price 94.87	4
**Zonneveld 95.59**	**6**
**7**	**Nijman 97.04**	**6**
Reyes 89.93	3
**Heta 102.50**	**6**
14	Schindler 104.09	4
**6**	**Bunting 92.30**	**6**
11	Aspinall 90.98	1

**Quarter-finals** (best of 11 legs); 18 October
**1**	**van Veen 99.24**	**6**
8	Searle 100.50	3
13	Woodhouse 99.84	2
**5**	**Noppert 113.42**	**6**
**Zonneveld 102.06**	**6**
7	Nijman 100.80	5
Heta 94.00	3
**6**	**Bunting 97.95**	**6**

**Semi-finals** (best of 13 legs); 18 October
1	van Veen 91.47	5
**5**	**Noppert 94.65**	**7**
**Zonneveld 92.22**	**7**
6	Bunting 86.07	4

**Final** (best of 15 legs); 18 October
5	Noppert 87.66	5
**Zonneveld 92.93**	**8**
