= Jimmy van Schie =

Dutch darts player (born 1993)

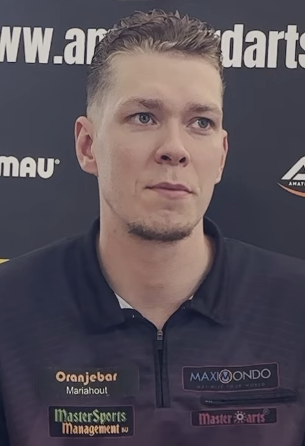
- Van Schie in 2024

Personal information
- Nickname: "The Dutch Sequoia"
- Born: 2 October 1993 (age 33) Breda, Netherlands

Sport
- Sport: Darts
- Playing since: 2010
- Darts: 24g Mission Nightfall M4
- Laterality: Right-handed
- Walk-on music: "Thank You (Not So Bad)" by Dimitri Vegas & Like Mike

Organisation (see split in darts)
- BDO: 2011–2020
- PDC: 2010–present (Tour Card: 2026–present)
- WDF: 2011–2025
- Current world ranking: (PDC) 86 (29 October 2026)

WDF major events – best performances
- World Championship: Winner (1): 2025
- World Masters: Winner (1): 2025
- Dutch Open: Last 32: 2025

PDC premier events – best performances
- UK Open: Last 96: 2025
- Masters: Last 32: 2026

Other tournament wins
- Years
Six Nations Cup	2025
WDF Events
Antwerp Open	2025
Belfry Open	2024, 2025
Belgium Open	2025
Catalonia Open	2024, 2025
Czech Open	2024
Hungarian Classic	2024
Italian Grand Masters	2024
Romanian Classic	2024
Swiss Open	2024
Team X-Treme Open	2024
PDC Challenge Tour
2024 CT18

Other achievements
- 2024–2025 World Darts Federation men's ranking leader
Medal record
Men's Darts
Representing Netherlands
WDF World Cup
Silver medal – second place	2025 Seoul	Men's pairs
WDF Europe Cup Youth
Gold medal – first place	2011 Aberdeen	Boys overall
Silver medal – second place	2011 Aberdeen	Boys pairs
Silver medal – second place	2011 Aberdeen	Boys team

Jimmy van Schie (born 2 October 1993) is a Dutch professional darts player who competes in Professional Darts Corporation (PDC) events and previously competed in World Darts Federation (WDF) and British Darts Organisation (BDO) events. He won the WDF World Championship in 2025. He is a former WDF world No. 1 and the winner of 14 WDF ranking titles. He also won the WDF World Masters in 2025. Van Schie won his first PDC Challenge Tour title at the 18th event of the 2024 season.

== Career ==
=== Early career ===
Van Schie made his debut on the PDC Pro Tour in 2010, taking part in Players Championship 28 in Nuland, but was eliminated in the Last 128. He was a part of the Dutch boys' team at the 2011 WDF Europe Youth Cup alongside Jimmy Hendriks, Jeffrey de Zwaan and Mike Zuydwijk who won the Boys Overall gold medal.

=== 2024 ===
Van Schie had his breakthrough year in 2024. During the 2024 WDF season, he won eight titles. He began the year by winning the Romanian Classic, defeating fellow Dutchman Alexander Merkx 5–4 in the final. He followed his maiden title by winning the Team X-Treme Open, Swiss Open, Catalonia Open, Italian Grand Masters, Belfry Open and the Hungarian Classic. He ended the season with victory at the Czech Open, where he beat Andreas Harrysson 5–2 to win the title. He also made the final of the Denmark Open and World Open, losing to Connor Scutt and Reece Colley. His ranking points accumulated over the year saw him rise to No. 1 in the WDF men's ranking.

Van Schie also found success in the PDC in the same year. He won his first PDC Challenge Tour title at Event 18 where he defeated Daniel Ayres 5–4 in the final. He finished the year 10th on the 2024 Challenge Tour Order of Merit. Van Schie returned to the PDC Pro Tour for the first time in fourteen years off the back of his Challenge Tour results, reaching the Last 32 twice. He reached the final of the West Europe Qualifier for the 2025 PDC World Darts Championship, but missed match darts before eventually losing 7–6 to Stefan Bellmont.

After missing out on the PDC World Championship, Van Schie made his world championship debut at the 2024 WDF World Darts Championship, entering the second round as second seed. He was considered the favourite to win the title due to his form at WDF events. He won his opening match against Björn Lejon 3–0 in sets with a 98.98 three-dart average. However, van Schie was eliminated from the tournament in the third round, losing 3–1 to Dutch Open champion Jarno Bottenberg.

=== 2025 ===
Van Schie retained his Catalonia Open and Belfry Open titles in 2025, hitting a nine-dart finish on his way to winning the latter. In November, he won the 2025 World Masters by defeating Jeff Smith 7–2 in the final, becoming the fourth Dutch player to win the tournament after Raymond van Barneveld, Michael van Gerwen and Wesley Plaisier.

Van Schie entered the 2025 WDF World Championship as the number one seed and reached the final of the tournament, defeating defending champion Shane McGuirk en route. He faced Mitchell Lawrie in the final, who had won the youth title earlier in the day. Van Schie lost the first three sets of the match before winning the next six in succession for a 6–3 comeback victory and his first world title.

=== 2026 ===
In January 2026, Van Schie won a PDC Tour Card at Q-School.

== Personal life ==
Van Schie has been noted for his height, standing at 2.07 metres (6 ft 9 in) tall. He originally chose to play basketball as a child, but lost interest and began playing darts.

== World Championship results ==
=== WDF World Championship ===
- 2024: Third round (lost to Jarno Bottenberg 1–3)
- 2025: Winner (beat Mitchell Lawrie 6–3)

== Career finals ==
=== WDF major finals: 2 (2 titles) ===
Legend
World Championship (1–0)
World Masters (1–0)

Outcome	No.	Year	Championship	Opponent in the final	Score (Note: (l) = score in legs, (s) = score in sets, (m) = matches won.)
Winner	1.	2025	World Masters	(Canada) Jeff Smith	7–2 (l)
Winner	2.	2025	World Darts Championship	(Scotland) Mitchell Lawrie	6–3 (s)

== Performance timeline ==
Jimmy van Schie's performance timeline is as follows:

=== WDF ===
Tournament	2024	2025
WDF Ranked major/platinum events
World Championship	3R	W
World Masters	QF	W
Dutch Open	DNP	8R
Career statistics
WDF Year-end ranking	1	1

=== PDC ===
Tournament	2025	2026
PDC Ranked televised events
World Masters	Prel.	1R
UK Open	3R	2R
Career statistics
Season-end ranking (PDC)	163	

==== European Tour ====
Tournament	2026
Baltic Sea Darts Open	QF
Dutch Darts Championship	2R

==== Players Championships ====
Season	1	2	3	4	5	6	7	8	9	10	11	12	13	14	15	16	17	18	19	20	21	22	23	24	25	26	27	28	29	30	31	32	33	34
2024 (Note: Not a Tour card holder)	Did not participate																			WIG; 2R	WIG; 1R	LEI; 1R	LEI; 1R	WIG; 2R	WIG; 3R	WIG; 1R	WIG; 1R	WIG; 3R	LEI; 1R	LEI; 1R				
2025	DNP			ROS; 1R	LEI; DNP		HIL; 4R	HIL; 1R	Did not participate					ROS; 4R	Did not participate							HIL; QF	HIL; 3R	Did not participate										
2026	HIL; 1R	HIL; 2R	WIG; 2R	WIG; 1R	LEI; 1R	LEI; 4R	LEI; 3R	LEI; 1R	WIG; 1R	WIG; 2R	MIL; 1R	MIL; 3R	HIL; 1R	HIL; 2R	LEI; 1R	LEI; 1R	LEI; 3R	LEI; 2R	MIL; 2R	MIL; 2R	WIG; 1R	WIG; 2R	LEI; 2R	LEI; 2R	HIL; 2R	HIL; 2R	LEI; 1R	LEI; 2R	ROS; 1R	ROS; 3R	ROS; 1R	ROS; 1R	LEI; 2R	LEI; 1R

Performance Table Legend
W	Won the tournament	F	Finalist	SF	Semifinalist	QF	Quarterfinalist	#R; RR; Prel.	Lost in # round Round-robin; Preliminary round	DQ	Disqualified
DNQ	Did not qualify	DNP	Did not participate	WD	Withdrew	NH	Tournament not held	#R; RR; Prel.	Lost in # round Round-robin; Preliminary round	NYF	Not yet founded
