= Mitchell Lawrie =

Scottish darts player (born 2010)

- Lawrie in 2026

Personal information
- Nickname: "Wee Sox"
- Born: 4 November 2010 (age 15) Renfrew, Scotland

Sport
- Sport: Darts
- Darts: 23g Target
- Laterality: Right-handed
- Walk-on music: "The Glen" by Beluga Lagoon (Levi Heron remix)

Organisation (see split in darts)
- WDF: 2023–present
- Current world ranking: (WDF) 1 (17 August 2026)

WDF major events – best performances
- World Championship: Runner-up: 2025
Medal record
Men's Darts
Representing Scotland
WDF Europe Cup Youth
Gold medal – first place	2025 Assen	Boys singles
Gold medal – first place	2025 Assen	Boys team
Gold medal – first place	2026 Limerick	Boys singles
Gold medal – first place	2026 Limerick	Boys team
Gold medal – first place	2026 Limerick	Boys overall
Silver medal – second place	2025 Assen	Boys overall
Silver medal – second place	2026 Limerick	Boys pairs

Mitchell Lawrie (born 4 November 2010) is a Scottish darts player who competes in World Darts Federation (WDF) and Junior Darts Corporation (JDC) events. He is ranked WDF world No. 1, and is both the reigning WDF world youth champion and ranked no. 1 in the organisation's youth rankings. He is the youngest player to win three senior WDF titles and the youngest player to compete in a senior WDF World Championship. Lawrie finished as runner-up at the 2025 WDF World Championship, losing to Jimmy van Schie in the final.

Lawrie has found success in the WDF's youth system, most notably winning the 2025 WDF World Youth Championship. He also won the 2025 JDC World Darts Championship.

== Career ==
Lawrie has had an interest in playing darts since he was a toddler and started playing more regularly during the COVID-19 lockdown; he cites Scottish world champion Gary Anderson as his inspiration.

In December 2023, aged 13, Lawrie represented Scotland at the Junior Darts Corporation's JDC World Cup of Darts. He hit the winning double as Scotland beat Ireland 4–0 in the final. In the semi-finals of the tournament, Scotland defeated an England team that contained future world champion Luke Littler. In February 2024, Lawrie won three of the first four JDC Foundation Tour events of the year.

In May 2025, he became the first Scottish player to win a JDC Advanced Tour event. In July, Lawrie won the WDF Europe Youth Cup singles tournament and was part of Scotland's winning youth team. Lawrie won his first two senior WDF titles in September, winning both the Welsh and British Open. In October, he won the World Masters and World Open youth titles. He then won his third senior WDF title, the Irish Classic, to become the youngest player to win three senior WDF titles. Aged 15 years and 4 days old, he beat the previous record that was held by Luke Littler. At the end of November, Lawrie reached the 2025 JDC World Darts Championship final.

At the 2025 WDF World Darts Championship, Lawrie became the youngest player to compete in a senior event in the tournament's history, winning his opening match 3–0 against Tomoya Maruyama. He went on to reach the final by defeating Jenson Walker 5–2 in the semi-finals, with Walker being the first player to win sets against Lawrie during the tournament. Lawrie took a 3–0 lead in the final before losing 6–3 to Jimmy van Schie. He won his first WDF World Youth Championship by defeating Florian Preis 4–2 in the youth final. On 20 December 2025 at Alexandra Palace, Lawrie won the JDC World Championship by defeating Kaya Baysal 5–2.

In February 2026, following title wins in the Scottish Classic, Slovak Classic and Slovak Masters, Lawrie became the new WDF world no. 1. On the opening weekend of the 2026 JDC Advanced Tour, he hit a nine-dart finish and claimed three of four titles.

== Personal life ==
Lawrie is from Renfrew, Scotland, and is a pupil of Renfrew High School. His performances at the 2025 WDF World Darts Championship received formal recognition from Renfrewshire Council. Lawrie is a supporter of Scottish football club Rangers.

== Career finals ==
=== WDF major finals: 1 ===
Legend
World Championship (0–1)

Outcome	No.	Year	Championship	Opponent in the final	Score (Note: (l) = score in legs, (s) = score in sets.)
Runner-up	1.	2025	World Championship	(Netherlands) Jimmy van Schie	3–6 (s)

== Performance timeline ==
Mitchell Lawrie's performance timeline is as follows:

WDF

Tournament	2025
WDF Ranked platinum/major events
World Championship	F
WDF Year-end ranking	3

Tournament	2024	2025	2026
WDF Ranked platinum/major youth events (Note: Events listed were granted platinum status in 2025 or 2026.)
World Championship	DNP	W	
World Masters	4R	W	DNP
Scottish Open	SF	3R	W
World Open	3R	W	DNP
Irish Classic	QF	W	
Irish Open	W	W	

Key

Performance Table Legend
W	Won the tournament	F	Finalist	SF	Semifinalist	QF	Quarterfinalist	#R; RR; L#	Lost in # round Round-robin; Last # stage	DQ	Disqualified
DNQ	Did not qualify	DNP	Did not participate	WD	Withdrew	NH	Tournament not held	#R; RR; L#	Lost in # round Round-robin; Last # stage	NYF	Not yet founded

== Titles ==
=== WDF ===
==== Senior titles ====
Gold ranked

- 2026: Denmark Open

Silver ranked

- 2025: British Open, Irish Classic, Welsh Open
- 2026: Scottish Classic, Slovak Classic, Gibraltar Open

Bronze ranked

- 2026: Slovak Masters

==== Youth titles ====
Platinum/Major ranked

- 2025: Irish Classic, Irish Open, World Masters, World Open, World Championship
- 2026: Scottish Open

Gold ranked

- 2024: Irish Open
- 2025: Belgium Open, British Open
- 2026: Slovak Classic

Silver ranked

- 2025: Scottish Spring Singles, Welsh Open

=== Soft Tip ===
- 2026: Dartslive The World (Japan)
