= 2025 WDF World Darts Championship =

Annual darts tournament

Tournament information
- Dates: 28 November – 7 December 2025
- Venue: Lakeside Country Club
- Location: Frimley Green, Surrey, England
- Organisation(s): World Darts Federation (WDF)
- Format: Sets
- Prize fund: £221,000 (total)
- Winner's share: £50,000 (open) £25,000 (women) £3,000 (youth) £1,500 (girls)
- High checkout: 170 Cliff Prior

Champion(s)
- Jimmy van Schie (NED) (open); Deta Hedman (ENG) (women); Mitchell Lawrie (SCO) (youth); Zehra Gemi (TUR) (girls)

The 2025 WDF World Darts Championship (officially the 2025 WDF Lakeside World Championship) was a darts tournament that was held from 28 November to 7 December 2025 at the Lakeside Country Club in Frimley Green, Surrey, England. It was the fourth World Darts Championship to be organised by the World Darts Federation since it succeeded the now-defunct British Darts Organisation. The tournament was broadcast on television by Welsh channel S4C and on YouTube by the WDF and S4C. The open tournament, (Note: The WDF's "men's" and "boys'" categories were renamed to "open" and "youth" following a change in the WDF's eligibility criteria that saw participation in women's and girls' events restricted to those born as female.) women's tournament, youth tournament, and girls' tournament shared a total prize fund of £221,000, with the open champion receiving the biggest winner's prize of £50,000.

In the senior competitions, Shane McGuirk was the defending open champion, having defeated Paul Lim 6–3 in the 2024 final to win his first world title, but lost 4–1 to Jimmy van Schie in the quarter-finals. Reigning women's champion Beau Greaves, who won her third women's world title in 2024, did not defend her title as she accepted a place in the 2026 PDC World Darts Championship. 15-year-old Mitchell Lawrie, who qualified for the open and youth tournaments, became the youngest player to compete in a senior WDF World Championship, surpassing the record previously held by Luke Littler.

Jimmy van Schie won his first world title with a 6–3 victory in the open final against Mitchell Lawrie, who became the first teenager to reach the final of the tournament. Van Schie, who overturned a 3–0 deficit in the final, was the fourth Dutch player to win the main title at Lakeside. Competing in her fourth women's world final, 66-year-old Deta Hedman defeated Lerena Rietbergen 4–1 to win her first world title and become the oldest world champion in darts history. The youth and girls' finals were won by Lawrie and Zehra Gemi respectively, with Gemi becoming the first Turkish world champion across all levels.

== Prize money ==
The total prize fund remained at £221,000. The winner of the open event received £50,000.

Position	Prize money			
Position	Open	Women	Youth	Girls
Winner	£50,000	£25,000	£3,000	£1,500
Runner-up	£16,000	£8,000	£1,500	£1,000
Semi-finalist	£8,000	£4,000	£1,000	£500
Quarter-finalist	£4,000	£2,000	£500	—N/a
Last 16	£2,000	£1,000	—N/a	—N/a
Last 24 (Note: The loser of the women's preliminary match also received the same prize money as players in the last 24.)	—N/a	£750	—N/a	—N/a
Last 32	£1,250	—N/a	—N/a	—N/a
Last 48	£750	—N/a	—N/a	—N/a
Event totals	£146,000	£63,000	£8,500	£3,500
Overall total	£221,000			

== Open ==
=== Format and qualifiers ===
The open event consisted of 48 players. Qualification for the event followed these criteria:

1. Top 16 players in WDF world rankings (seeded in the second round)
2. Winners of the Platinum/Gold ranked tournaments
3. First and second-ranked players from each of seven regional tables
4. Next highest-ranked players in the WDF world rankings to bring the total entry list to 44
5. Four qualifiers from the final qualification tournament

Shane McGuirk entered the tournament as the defending champion, having defeated Paul Lim 6–3 in the 2024 final to win his first world title. Leonard Gates, Alex Spellman, David Cameron, Jonny Tata and Lourence Ilagan originally qualified for the tournament, but decided to participate in the 2026 PDC World Darts Championship and were replaced. The list of participants is shown below.

**1–16 in WDF rankings**
Seeded in second round

1. **Jimmy van Schie (NED)** (champion)
2. Jason Brandon (USA) (second round)
3. Neil Duff (NIR) (second round)
4. James Beeton (ENG) (quarter-finals)
5. Benjamin Pratnemer (SLO) (third round)
6. David Fatum (USA) (second round)
7. Matt Clark (ENG) (third round)
8. Corné Groeneveld (NED) (second round)
9. Stefan Schröder (NED) (second round)
10. François Schweyen (BEL) (quarter-finals)
11. Raymond Smith (AUS) (third round)
12. ~~David Pallett (ENG)~~ (Note: David Pallett withdrew from the tournament due to personal reasons. Reserve player Marcus Maier took his place in the second round.)
13. Liam Maendl-Lawrance (GER) (second round)
14. Thomas Junghans (SWI) (second round)
15. ~~Andy Davidson (SCO)~~ (Note: Andy Davidson withdrew from the tournament due to health reasons. His opponent, Jeff Springer, received a bye to the third round.)
16. Paul Krohne (GER) (third round)

**Platinum/Gold event winners**
First round

- Marko Kantele (FIN) (first round)
- Shane McGuirk (IRE) (quarter-finals)
- Jeffrey Sparidaans (NED) (second round)

**Regional table qualifiers**
First round

- Ben Robb (NZL) (quarter-finals)
- Dennis Nilsson (SWE) (second round)
- Mitchell Lawrie (SCO) (runner-up)
- Caleb Hope (NZL) (third round)
- Karl Schaefer (AUS) (first round)
- Jim McEwan (SCO) (first round)
- Kevin Luke (USA) (first round)
- Dalibor Šmolík (CZE) (second round)
- Clint Clarkson (CAN) (second round)
- Haruki Muramatsu (JPN) (second round)
- Jonas Masalin (FIN) (third round)
- Shane Sakchekapo (CAN) (first round)
- Tomoya Maruyama (JPN) (first round)

**Highest-ranked non-qualified**
First round

- Brian Raman (BEL) (first round)
- Vince Tipple (ENG) (first round)
- Ryan Hogarth (SCO) (first round)
- Jenson Walker (ENG) (semi-finals)
- Alex Williams (WAL) (second round)
- Cliff Prior (ENG) (first round)
- Bradley Kirk (ENG) (first round)
- Jeff Springer (USA) (third round)
- Jiří Brejcha (CZE) (first round)
- Darren Johnson (ENG) (first round)
- Johan Engström (SWE) (first round)
- Daniel Bauerdick (GER) (second round)

**Qualifier winners**
First round

- Stephen Rosney (IRL) (third round)
- Petri Rasmus (FIN) (first round)
- ~~Boris Krčmar (CRO)~~ (Note: Boris Krčmar withdrew from the tournament due to scheduling conflicts. Reserve player Sybren Gijbels took his place in the first round.)
- Romeo Grbavac (CRO) (first round)

**Reserve players**
First round/second round

- Sybren Gijbels (BEL) (semi-finals)
- Marcus Maier (GER) (second round)

=== Draw ===
The draw was confirmed on 2 November. Numbers to the left of a player's name show the 16 seeded players for the tournament. The 3 qualifier winners are indicated by 'Q'. The two replacement players are indicated by 'Alt'. Figures to the right of a player's name state their three-dart average in a match. Players in bold denote match winners.

**First round** (best of 5 sets); 28–30 November
**Alex Williams 82.91**	**3**
Q	Romeo Grbavac 81.92	2
Marko Kantele 81.29	1
**Dalibor Šmolík 85.67**	**3**
Ryan Hogarth 85.45	1
**Jonas Masalin 89.22**	**3**
**Shane McGuirk 91.52**	**3**
Q	Petri Rasmus 87.53	1
**Dennis Nilsson 86.68**	**3**
Shane Sakchekapo 84.35	0
**Caleb Hope 78.00**	**3**
Darren Johnson 83.62	0
Karl Schaefer 73.26	2
**Daniel Bauerdick 74.89**	**3**
Kevin Luke 82.82	2
**Alt**	**Sybren Gijbels 83.27**	**3**
**Mitchell Lawrie 90.46**	**3**
Tomoya Maruyama 84.35	0
Bradley Kirk 82.48	1
**Jeff Springer 82.45**	**3**
Vince Tipple 76.10	1
**Haruki Muramatsu 85.10**	**3**
Brian Raman 85.69	2
**Jeffrey Sparidaans 86.44**	**3**
**Ben Robb 91.56**	**3**
Johan Engström 89.41	1
Jim McEwan 84.15	0
**Q**	**Stephen Rosney 84.81**	**3**
**Jenson Walker 84.04**	**3**
Jiří Brejcha 76.81	0
Cliff Prior 83.18	0
**Clint Clarkson 78.58**	**3**

**Second round** (best of 5 sets); 29 November–3 December
**1**	**Jimmy van Schie 87.93**	**3**
Alex Williams 81.91	0
**16**	**Paul Krohne 85.11**	**3**
Dalibor Šmolík 86.39	1
8	Corné Groeneveld 89.03	2
**Jonas Masalin 87.39**	**3**
9	Stefan Schröder 84.05	1
**Shane McGuirk 91.43**	**3**
**4**	**James Beeton 79.41**	**3**
Dennis Nilsson 81.09	2
13	Liam Maendl-Lawrance 86.02	0
**Caleb Hope 85.41**	**3**
**5**	**Benjamin Pratnemer 82.66**	**3**
Daniel Bauerdick 78.42	0
Alt	Marcus Maier 70.63	1
**Alt**	**Sybren Gijbels 80.74**	**3**
2	Jason Brandon 89.55	0
**Mitchell Lawrie 97.21**	**3**
15	Andy Davidson
**Jeff Springer**	**w/o**
**7**	**Matt Clark 85.48**	**3**
Haruki Muramatsu 79.32	1
**10**	**François Schweyen 84.16**	**3**
Jeffrey Sparidaans 82.66	2
3	Neil Duff 87.39	1
**Ben Robb 96.29**	**3**
14	Thomas Junghans 79.18	0
**Q**	**Stephen Rosney 89.65**	**3**
6	David Fatum 73.51	1
**Jenson Walker 78.24**	**3**
**11**	**Raymond Smith 90.14**	**3**
Clint Clarkson 81.65	0

**Third round** (best of 5 sets); 4 December
**1**	**Jimmy van Schie 95.84**	**3**
16	Paul Krohne 86.24	1
Jonas Masalin 91.01	1
**Shane McGuirk 92.98**	**3**
**4**	**James Beeton 82.40**	**3**
Caleb Hope 80.85	2
5	Benjamin Pratnemer 90.52	1
**Alt**	**Sybren Gijbels 86.30**	**3**
**Mitchell Lawrie 93.06**	**3**
Jeff Springer 78.48	0
7	Matt Clark 80.88	1
**10**	**François Schweyen 81.23**	**3**
**Ben Robb 91.72**	**3**
Q	Stephen Rosney 82.95	0
**Jenson Walker 92.70**	**3**
11	Raymond Smith 89.74	1

**Quarter-finals** (best of 7 sets); 5 December
**1**	**Jimmy van Schie 97.36**	**4**
Shane McGuirk 95.26	1
4	James Beeton 82.75	1
**Alt**	**Sybren Gijbels 86.00**	**4**
**Mitchell Lawrie 92.06**	**4**
10	François Schweyen 84.65	0
Ben Robb 82.51	2
**Jenson Walker 83.35**	**4**

**Semi-finals** (best of 9 sets); 6 December
**1**	**Jimmy van Schie 93.07**	**5**
Alt	Sybren Gijbels 85.97	1
**Mitchell Lawrie 96.33**	**5**
Jenson Walker 93.62	2

**Final** (best of 11 sets); 7 December
**1**	**Jimmy van Schie 93.21**	**6**
Mitchell Lawrie 93.18	3

== Women's ==
=== Format and qualifiers ===
The women's event consisted of 25 players. Qualification for the event followed the same criteria as the open tournament, with the top eight players in the WDF women's rankings being seeded in the second round. Having originally consisted of 24 players, the WDF announced that a calculation error had led to Maud Jansson receiving the final place in the tournament before the last-chance qualifiers took place, ahead of Lisa Zollikofer. The WDF elected to allow both players to compete, with Zollikofer replacing the first qualifier in the draw. As a result, Nina Lech-Musialska and Mayumi Ouchi, the players who won the two last-chance qualifiers, faced off in a play-in match where the winner advanced to the last 24. Reigning women's champion Beau Greaves, who defeated Sophie McKinlay 4–1 in the 2024 final to win her third women's world title, was unable to defend her title, having opted to participate in the 2026 PDC World Darts Championship. The list of participants is shown below.

1–8 in WDF rankings
Seeded in second round

1. Lerena Rietbergen (NED) (runner-up)
2. Lorraine Hyde (SCO) (quarter-finals)
3. Deta Hedman (ENG) (champion)
4. Nicole Regnaud (NZL) (second round)
5. Rhian O'Sullivan (WAL) (semi-finals)
6. Sophie McKinlay (SCO) (quarter-finals)
7. Tracy Feiertag (USA) (second round)
8. Aileen de Graaf (NED) (second round)

Platinum/Gold event winners
First round

- Joanne Hadley (AUS) (first round)
- Mikuru Suzuki (JPN) (second round)

Regional table qualifiers
First round

- Kirsi Viinikainen (FIN) (first round)
- Jitka Císařová (CZE) (second round)
- Paige Pauling (ENG) (second round)
- Maria Carli (CAN) (quarter-finals)

Highest-ranked non-qualifiers
First round

- Paula Murphy (USA) (first round)
- Irina Armstrong (GER) (first round)
- Priscilla Steenbergen (NED) (semi-finals)
- Aletta Wajer (NED) (second round)
- Eve Watson (WAL) (quarter-finals)
- Aaja Jalbert (USA) (first round)
- Emine Dursun (TUR) (second round)
- Lisa Zollikofer (GER) (first round)
- Maud Jansson (SWE) (first round)

Qualifier winners
Preliminary round

- Mayumi Ouchi (JPN) (preliminary round)
- Nina Lech-Musialska (POL) (first round)

=== Draw ===
The draw was confirmed on 2 November.

Preliminary round (best of 3 sets); 28 November
Q	Mayumi Ouchi 56.88	0
Q	Nina Lech-Musialska 64.10	2

First round (best of 3 sets); 29–30 November
Aletta Wajer 74.05	2
Aaja Jalbert 69.37	0
Joanne Hadley 64.52	0
Eve Watson 78.20	2
Irina Armstrong 70.10	1
Maria Carli 69.62	2
Jitka Císařová 65.37	2
Maud Jansson 61.46	0
Paula Murphy 61.83	0
Emine Dursun 73.43	2
Priscilla Steenbergen 69.59	2
Q	Nina Lech-Musialska 68.93	0
Kirsi Viinikainen 74.31	1
Mikuru Suzuki 73.99	2
Paige Pauling 69.87	2
Lisa Zollikofer 66.40	0

Second round (best of 3 sets); 1–4 December
1	Lerena Rietbergen 71.41	2
Aletta Wajer 69.19	1
8	Aileen de Graaf 68.57	0
Eve Watson 78.59	2
4	Nicole Regnaud 66.27	0
Maria Carli 63.19	2
5	Rhian O'Sullivan 77.74	2
Jitka Císařová 63.79	0
2	Lorraine Hyde 73.10	2
Emine Dursun 70.80	1
7	Tracy Feiertag 61.35	0
Priscilla Steenbergen 69.56	2
3	Deta Hedman 76.19	2
Mikuru Suzuki 77.52	1
6	Sophie McKinlay 69.67	2
Paige Pauling 67.33	1

Quarter-finals (best of 5 sets); 5 December
1	Lerena Rietbergen 69.52	3
Eve Watson 66.26	0
Maria Carli 61.09	1
5	Rhian O'Sullivan 68.86	3
2	Lorraine Hyde 71.39	1
Priscilla Steenbergen 72.39	3
3	Deta Hedman 69.39	3
6	Sophie McKinlay 74.90	0

Semi-finals (best of 5 sets); 6 December
1	Lerena Rietbergen 73.86	3
5	Rhian O'Sullivan 75.81	2
Priscilla Steenbergen 73.78	1
3	Deta Hedman 82.24	3

Final (best of 7 sets); 7 December
1	Lerena Rietbergen 70.07	1
3	Deta Hedman 72.01	4

== Youth ==
=== Format and qualifiers ===
The youth event consisted of eight players. The top four players in the WDF youth rankings were seeded, and were matched up against four qualifiers in the quarter-finals. The list of participants is shown below.

1–4 in WDF rankings
Seeded

1. Mitchell Lawrie (SCO) (champion)
2. Florian Preis (GER) (runner-up)
3. Mason Teese (ENG) (semi-finals)
4. Kaya Baysal (ENG) (semi-finals)

Qualifier winners
Unseeded

- Thees Kogelnik (GER) (first round)
- Archie Self (ENG) (first round)
- Benedek Szabó (HUN) (first round)
- Ádám Sepsi (HUN) (first round)

=== Draw ===
The draw was confirmed on 2 November.

Quarter-finals (best of 3 sets); 4–5 December
1	Mitchell Lawrie 89.87	2
Q	Ádám Sepsi 73.49	0
4	Kaya Baysal 80.29	2
Q	Thees Kogelnik 73.33	1
2	Florian Preis 87.91	2
Q	Archie Self 88.50	0
3	Mason Teese 75.95	2
Q	Benedek Szabó 70.90	1

Semi-Finals (best of 5 sets); 6 December
1	Mitchell Lawrie 91.91	3
4	Kaya Baysal 88.25	0
2	Florian Preis 85.43	3
3	Mason Teese 76.37	2

Final (best of 7 sets); 7 December
1	Mitchell Lawrie 89.35	4
2	Florian Preis 88.45	2

== Girls' ==
=== Format and qualifiers ===
The girls' event consisted of four players. The top two players in the WDF girls' rankings were seeded, and were matched up against two qualifiers in the semi-finals. The list of participants is shown below.

1–2 in WDF rankings
Seeded

1. Paige Pauling (ENG) (semi-finals)
2. Ruby Grey (ENG) (semi-finals)

Qualifier winners
Unseeded

- Zehra Gemi (TUR) (champion)
- Rebecca Allen (IRL) (runner-up)

=== Draw ===
The draw was confirmed on 2 November.

Semi-finals (best of 3 sets); 6 December
1	Paige Pauling 71.05	1
Q	Zehra Gemi 71.41	2
2	Ruby Grey 58.92	0
Q	Rebecca Allen 66.25	2

Final (best of 5 sets); 7 December
Q	Zehra Gemi 77.07	3
Q	Rebecca Allen 65.54	0

== Statistics ==
=== Top averages ===
This table shows the highest averages achieved by players throughout the tournament.

==== Open ====
#	Player	Round	Average	Result	Score
1	Jimmy van Schie	QF	97.36	Won	4–1
2	Mitchell Lawrie	R2	97.21	Won	3–0
3	Mitchell Lawrie (2)	SF	96.33	Won	5–2
4	Ben Robb	R2	96.29	Won	3–1
5	Jimmy van Schie (2)	R3	95.84	Won	3–1
6	Shane McGuirk	QF	95.26	Lost	1–4
7	Jenson Walker	SF	93.62	Lost	2–5
8	Jimmy van Schie (3)	F	93.21	Won	6–3
9	Mitchell Lawrie (3)	F	93.18	Lost	3–6
10	Jimmy van Schie (4)	SF	93.07	Won	5–1

==== Women's ====
#	Player	Round	Average	Result	Score
1	Deta Hedman	SF	82.24	Won	3–1
2	Eve Watson	R2	78.59	Won	2–0
3	Eve Watson (2)	R1	78.20	Won	2–0
4	Rhian O'Sullivan	R2	77.74	Won	2–0
5	Mikuru Suzuki	R2	77.52	Lost	1–2
6	Deta Hedman (2)	R2	76.19	Won	2–1
