= WDF World Darts Championship =

Darts world championship

Tournament information
- Venue: Lakeside Country Club
- Location: Frimley Green, Surrey, England
- Established: 2022
- Organisation(s): World Darts Federation (WDF)
- Format: Sets
- Prize fund: £221,000 (total)
- Month(s) Played: November–December

Current champion(s)
- Jimmy van Schie (open) (Note: The WDF's "men's" and "boys'" categories were renamed to "open" and "youth" in 2025.); Deta Hedman (women); Mitchell Lawrie (youth); Zehra Gemi (girls)

The WDF World Darts Championship is an annual world championship in the sport of darts organised by the World Darts Federation (WDF). Since 2024, the championship has run from late November to early December. The event has been held at the Lakeside Country Club in Frimley Green, Surrey, England, every year since the inaugural edition in 2022.

Following the collapse of the British Darts Organisation (BDO) in 2020, which hosted the BDO World Darts Championship at Lakeside from 1986 to 2019 and held the tournament's final edition in 2020, the WDF World Championship was established as the successor. It is one of two World Championships in darts, along with the PDC World Darts Championship.

Jimmy van Schie is the reigning WDF world champion, having defeated Mitchell Lawrie 6–3 in the 2025 final. Deta Hedman is the reigning women's world champion, Mitchell Lawrie is the reigning youth world champion, and Zehra Gemi is the reigning girls' world champion. Beau Greaves is the only player to win multiple WDF World Championships, winning the first three editions of the women's tournament.

== History ==
The BDO World Darts Championship was a world championship in the sport of darts organised by the British Darts Organisation (BDO). The tournament was first held in 1978 and was the only form of the World Professional Darts Championship until the 1993 split in darts, when top players broke away from the BDO to set up the rival World Darts Council (WDC), now the Professional Darts Corporation (PDC), which began hosting its own World Championship. The Lakeside Country Club in Frimley Green, Surrey, England, served as the host venue for the BDO tournament from 1986 to 2019, with the event being moved to the Indigo at The O2 for the 2020 event. The 2020 event ended up being the last edition of the BDO World Championship, as the organisation went into liquidation in September 2020 following a series of financial issues relating to poor ticket sales and prize money.

Following the collapse of the BDO, the World Darts Federation (WDF), a darts tournament organiser and governing body, announced its intention to launch its own World Championship. Returning to the Lakeside Country Club and initially scheduled to take place in January 2022, the inaugural edition of the WDF World Championship took place in April 2022 after being postponed due to concerns surrounding the COVID-19 pandemic. The event saw the introduction of a separate girls' tournament, which joined the men's tournament, women's tournament and boys' tournament in the schedule. The PDC granted permission for its new Tour Card holders to compete at the WDF World Championship if they qualified for the tournament before the event's postponement. At the event, Richard Veenstra produced the highest three-dart average in Lakeside history (104.91) in his 3–0 third-round victory over Luke Littler, breaking an 18-year record held by Raymond van Barneveld.

The WDF moved the World Championship to December for the 2023 edition, taking place right before the 2024 PDC World Championship. As a result, the PDC ruled against allowing players to compete in both events. This rule prevented three-time women's world champion Beau Greaves from competing in the PDC World Championship, rejecting her place at the tournament in order to defend her world title at Lakeside in 2023 and 2024, before she made a full switch to the PDC ahead of the 2026 PDC World Championship. Since 2024, the WDF World Championship has run from late November to early December.

== Tournament finals ==
=== Open ===
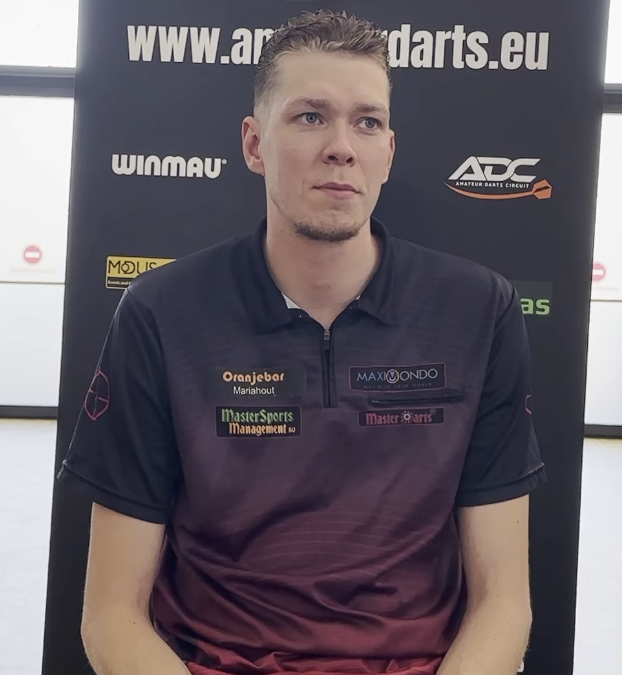
Jimmy van Schie, the reigning WDF world champion

Neil Duff was the first WDF world champion, defeating Thibault Tricole in a deciding set in the 2022 final. Andy Baetens won the tournament in 2023 by beating Chris Landman 6–1. In 2024, 70-year-old Paul Lim, who hit the first world championship nine-dart finish at the 1990 BDO World Darts Championship, reached the final of the tournament, becoming the oldest player to reach a darts world championship final. He missed out on the title, losing 6–3 to Shane McGuirk. In contrast, 15-year-old Mitchell Lawrie reached the final in 2025 to become the tournament's first teenage finalist. He lost to Jimmy van Schie by the same scoreline. Duff, Baetens and McGuirk were the first senior world champions from Northern Ireland, Belgium and the Republic of Ireland respectively.

Year	Champion (average in final) (Note: See three-dart average)	Score	Runner-up (average in final)	Prize money		
Year	Champion (average in final)	Score	Runner-up (average in final)	Total	Champion	Runner-up
2022	Neil Duff (87.73)	6 – 5	Thibault Tricole (86.95)	£200,000	£50,000	£25,000
2023	Andy Baetens (93.69)	6 – 1	Chris Landman (86.47)	£170,000	£50,000	£20,000
2024	Shane McGuirk (90.31)	6 – 3	Paul Lim (83.76)	£130,000	£50,000	£16,000
2025	Jimmy van Schie (93.21)	6 – 3	Mitchell Lawrie (93.18)	£146,000	£50,000	£16,000

=== Women's ===
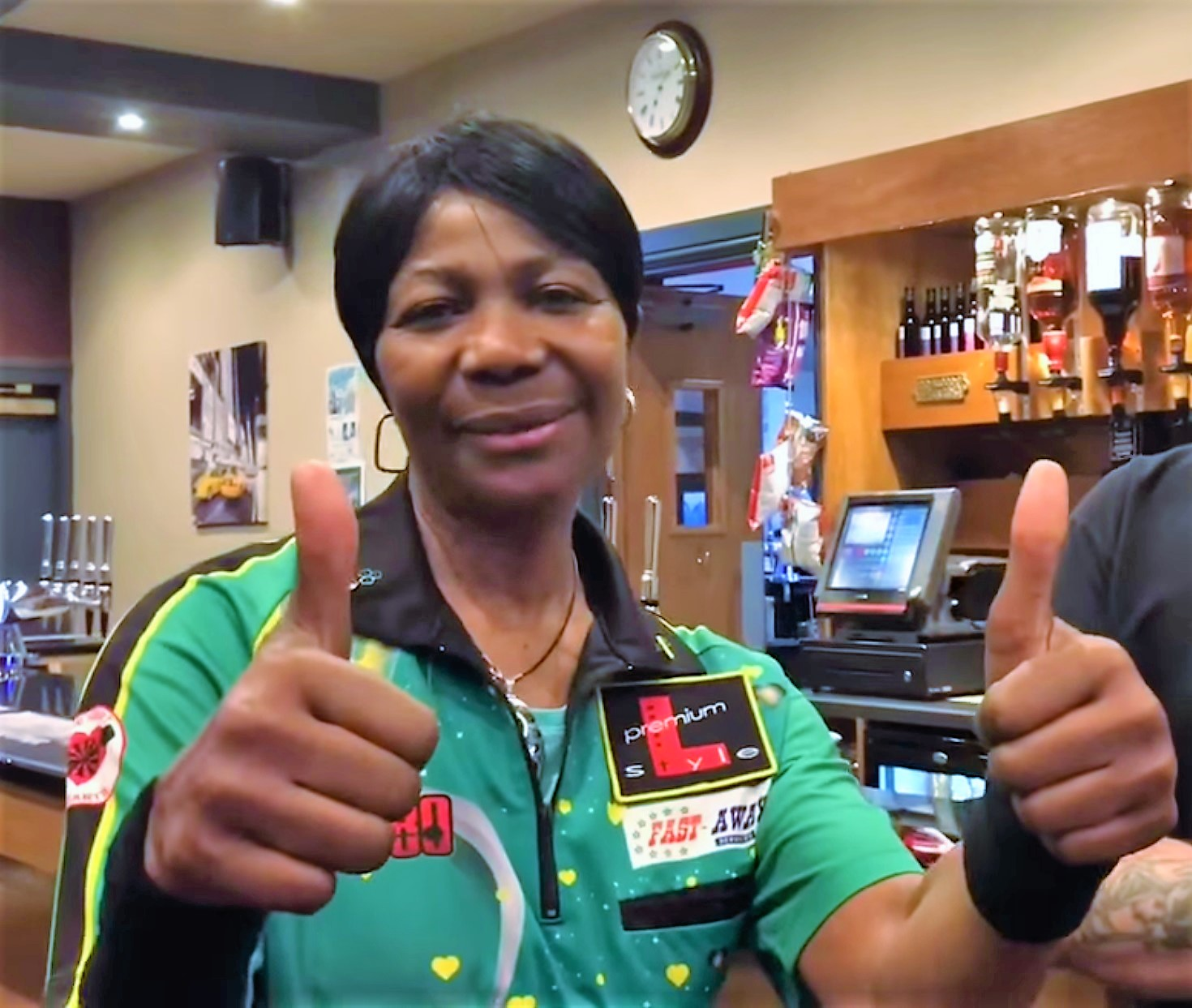
Deta Hedman, the reigning WDF women's world champion

At age 18, Beau Greaves won the 2022 women's final by defeating Kirsty Hutchinson 4–0, becoming the then-youngest player to win a senior world championship. Greaves defended her title at the next two editions, beating Aileen de Graaf and Sophie McKinlay in the 2023 and 2024 finals. McKinlay was the first player to compete in the final of the women's and girls' tournaments. With Greaves absent from 2025 edition, Deta Hedman, the runner-up in three BDO World Championship finals, won her first world title with a 4–1 victory over Lerena Rietbergen. Hedman became the oldest darts world champion, aged 66.

Year	Champion (average in final)	Score	Runner-up (average in final)	Prize money		
Year	Champion (average in final)	Score	Runner-up (average in final)	Total	Champion	Runner-up
2022	Beau Greaves (92.05)	4 – 0	Kirsty Hutchinson (72.53)	£87,500	£25,000	£12,500
2023	Beau Greaves (84.64) (2)	4 – 1	Aileen de Graaf (77.69)	£75,000	£25,000	£10,000
2024	Beau Greaves (83.92) (3)	4 – 1	Sophie McKinlay (73.81)	£60,000	£25,000	£8,000
2025	Deta Hedman (72.01)	4 – 1	Lerena Rietbergen (70.07)	£63,000	£25,000	£8,000

=== Youth ===
Bradly Roes defeated Charlie Large 3–1 in the first WDF boys' final in 2022, becoming the third Lakeside youth world champion from the Netherlands. His compatriot Bradley van der Velden won the 2023 title by beating Adam Dee 3–0. Archie Self became champion in 2023 with a 3–2 win over Jenson Walker in an all-English final. Mitchell Lawrie was the first Scottish winner of the tournament, beating Florian Preis 4–2 in the 2025 final.

Year	Champion (average in final)	Score	Runner-up (average in final)	Prize money		
Year	Champion (average in final)	Score	Runner-up (average in final)	Total	Champion	Runner-up
2022	Bradly Roes (71.34)	3 – 1	Charlie Large (71.56)	£9,500	£5,000	£2,500
2023	Bradley van der Velden (69.93)	3 – 0	Adam Dee (66.68)	£9,000	£5,000	£2,000
2024	Archie Self (81.34)	3 – 2	Jenson Walker (84.76)	£7,500	£3,000	£1,500
2025	Mitchell Lawrie (89.35)	4 – 2	Florian Preis (88.45)	£8,500	£3,000	£1,500

=== Girls ===
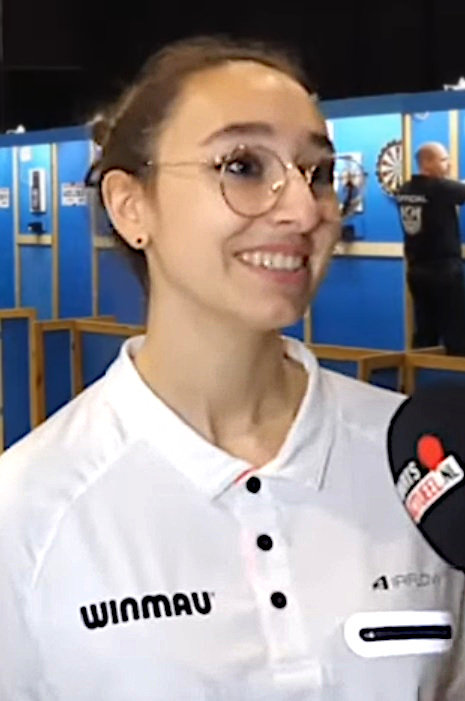
Aurora Fochesato, the 2023 WDF girls' world champion

Eleanor Cairns was the inaugural Lakeside girls' champion, defeating Wibke Riemann 2–0 in 2022. Aurora Fochesato won the 2023 final 2–0 against Krisztina Turai to become Italy's first world champion. Paige Pauling won the third edition by beating Sophie McKinlay 2–0, while Zehra Gemi became the first Turkish world champion with a 3–0 win over Rebecca Allen in the 2025 final.

Year	Champion (average in final)	Score	Runner-up (average in final)	Prize money		
Year	Champion (average in final)	Score	Runner-up (average in final)	Total	Champion	Runner-up
2022	Eleanor Cairns (52.45)	2 – 0	Wibke Riemann (52.22)	£3,000	£2,000	£1,000
2023	Aurora Fochesato (59.43)	2 – 0	Krisztina Turai (51.07)	£3,000	£2,000	£1,000
2024	Paige Pauling (73.88)	2 – 0	Sophie McKinlay (71.92)	£3,500	£1,500	£1,000
2025	Zehra Gemi (77.07)	3 – 0	Rebecca Allen (65.54)	£3,500	£1,500	£1,000

== See also ==
- WDF World Cup
- World Masters (darts)
