= Ryan Hogarth =

Scottish darts player

Personal information
- Nickname: "HeadHunter"
- Born: 25 January 1992 (age 34) Glasgow, Scotland
- Home town: Kelso, Scotland

Sport
- Sport: Darts
- Playing since: 2011
- Darts: 21 Gram One80
- Laterality: Right-handed
- Walk-on music: "Hate to Say I Told You So" by The Hives

Organisation (see split in darts)
- BDO: 2011–2020
- PDC: 2020–2024
- WDF: 2021–
- Current world ranking: (WDF) 83 ▼18 (17 August 2026)

WDF major events – best performances
- World Championship: Last 16: 2020
- World Masters: Last 32: 2019
- World Trophy: Last 16: 2018

Other tournament wins
- Tournament: Years
- Isle of Man Masters: 2022

Ryan Hogarth (born 25 January 1992) is a Scottish professional darts player who competes in World Darts Federation (WDF) and Professional Darts Corporation (PDC) events.

== Career ==
In 2018, Hogarth qualified for the 2019 BDO World Darts Championship as a qualifier, but he lost 3–1 to Oliver Ferenc of Serbia in the preliminary round. At the start of the following year, Hogarth reached the final of the Dutch Open, losing out 3–2 to Richard Veenstra.

He qualified for the 2020 BDO World Darts Championship as the 15th seed, but lost in the second round to Jim Williams.

Hogarth started to compete in the PDC circuit in 2020.

== World Championship results ==
=== BDO ===
- 2019: Preliminary round (lost to Oliver Ferenc 1–3)
- 2020: Second round (lost to Jim Williams 0–4)

=== WDF ===
- 2024: Second round (lost to Jarno Bottenberg 1–3)
- 2025: First round (lost to Jonas Masalin 1–3)
