= 2023 WDF calendar =

Tournament information
- Dates: Yearly
- Country: Worldwide
- Organisation(s): WDF
- Format: 501 Legs (men's & women's)
- Prize fund: Depends on tournament's category

2023 WDF season of darts comprises every tournament of World Darts Federation. The prize money of the tournaments may vary depending on category.

Two of WDF's most prestigious events are due to be held in 2023, WDF World Darts Championship (to be held in December), and WDF World Cup (to be held in September)

2023 is the third year in darts under WDF-sole management after the demise of BDO in 2020.

== Tournament categories, points & prize money ==
World Darts Federation		Points						
Category	Prize Fund ($)	1st	2nd	3/4	5/8	9/16	17/32	33/64
Platinum	It depends on each tournament	270	167	103	64	39	26	13
Gold	It depends on each tournament	180	111	68	43	26	17	9
Silver	It depends on each tournament	90	56	34	21	13	9	
Bronze	It depends on each tournament	45	28	17	11	6		

== Calendar ==
=== January ===
Date	Tournament	Cat.	Venue	City	Prize money	Men's			Women's		
Date	Tournament	Cat.	Venue	City	Prize money	winner	score	runner-up	winner	score	runner-up
January 21	Las Vegas Open	Silver	Tuscany Suites and Casino	(United States) Paradise	$7,430	(United States) Chris Lim	6–5	(United States) Gary Mawson	(United States) Paula Murphy	5–2	(United States) Cali West
January 21–22	Romanian Classic	Bronze	Radisson Blu Hotel	(Romania) Bucharest	€4,000	(Scotland) Gary Stone	5–3	(Wales) Mark Graham	(England) Beau Greaves	4–0	(England) Kirsty Hutchinson
January 22	Romanian International	Silver	Radisson Blu Hotel	(Romania) Bucharest	€8,000	(Romania) László Kádár	5–4	(Scotland) Gary Stone	(England) Beau Greaves	5–0	(England) Deta Hedman
January 28–29	Dutch Open	Platinum	De Bonte Wever	(Netherlands) Assen	€26,250	(Netherlands) Berry van Peer	3–1	(Belgium) Andy Baetens	(Netherlands) Aileen de Graaf	5–2	(England) Beau Greaves
January 28	Tri City Open	Non-ranked	The Grand Guelph	(Canada) Guelph	C$2,545	(Canada) Jim Long	bt.	(Canada) Darcy Trenholm	(Canada) Erin Brown	bt.	(Canada) Darlene Van Sleeuwen

=== February ===
Date	Tournament	Cat.	Venue	City	Prize money	Men's			Women's		
Date	Tournament	Cat.	Venue	City	Prize money	winner	score	runner-up	winner	score	runner-up
February 3–4	Reykjavik International Games	Non-ranked	Bullseye Reykjavík	(Iceland) Reykjavík	n/a	(Iceland) Alexander Veigar Þorvaldsson	5–4	(Iceland) Matthías Örn Friðriksson	(Iceland) Brynja Herborg	4–1	(Iceland) Steinunn Ingvarsdóttir
February 5	Canterbury Open	Silver	Canterbury & Suburban Darts Assoc.	(New Zealand) Christchurch	NZ$7,725	(New Zealand) Haupai Puha	5–4	(New Zealand) Warren Parry	(Australia) Kym Mitchell	5–2	(New Zealand) Wendy Harper
February 4–5	Snoflake Open	Non-ranked	Edmonton Inn & Conference Centre	(Canada) Edmonton	C$5,400	(Canada) Ken MacNeil	bt.	(Canada) Ron Looker	(Canada) Brenda Moreau	bt.	(Canada) Kim Bellay-Rousselle
February 11	Shoot for the Moon	Silver	DoubleTree by Hilton	(United States) Decatur	$5,340	(United States) Jason Brandon	5–2	(United States) Joe Chaney	(United States) Paula Murphy	5–2	(United States) Sandy Haas
February 18	Syracuse Open	Non-ranked	Crowne Plaza	(United States) Syracuse	$4,600	(United States) Danny Baggish	4–2	(United States) Alex Spellman	(United States) Carolyn Mars	4–0	(United States) Tracy Feiertag
February 18–19	Scottish Open	Silver	Normandy Cosmopolitan Hotel	(Scotland) Renfrew	£10,550	(England) Jordan Brooks	6–4	(England) Martin Atkins	(England) Deta Hedman	5–4	(Wales) Rhian O'Sullivan
February 19	South Australian Classic	Gold	Licensed Club Darts Association	(Australia) Salisbury Park	AU$16,025	(Australia) Ky Smith	6–5	(Australia) Josh Kime	(Australia) Amanda Loch	5–4	(Australia) Joanne Hadley
February 25	Port City Open	Non-ranked	DoubleTree by Hilton Hotel Portland	(United States) South Portland	$4,850	(United States) Danny Baggish	4–2	(United States) Matt Arpin	(United States) Paula Murphy	4–1	(United States) Tracy Feiertag
February 25	Slovak Open	Silver	x-bionic® sphere	(Slovakia) Šamorín	€8,000	(Germany) Liam Maendl-Lawrance	5–4	(Belgium) Andy Baetens	(Germany) Irina Armstrong	5–1	(Czech Republic) Jitka Císarová
February 26	Slovak Masters	Bronze	x-bionic® sphere	(Slovakia) Šamorín	€3,150	(Slovenia) Benjamin Pratnemer	5–4	(Germany) Ole Holtkamp	(Sweden) Maud Jansson	5–4	(Scotland) Sophie McKinlay

=== March ===
Date	Tournament	Cat.	Venue	City	Prize money	Men's			Women's		
Date	Tournament	Cat.	Venue	City	Prize money	winner	score	runner-up	winner	score	runner-up
March 4	Missouri St. Patricks Open	Bronze	Inn at Grand Glaize	(United States) Osage Beach	$2,295	(United States) Leonard Gates	6–4	(United States) Dustin Holt	(United States) Paula Murphy	4–0	(United States) Julie Weger
March 4–5	Halifax Open	Non-ranked	Bedford Legion Club	(Canada) Bedford	C$1,625	(Canada) Jason Smith	bt.	(Canada) Dion Laviolette	(Canada) Darlene Van Sleeuwen	bt.	(Canada) Stefenie Smith
March 5	NSW Great Lakes Open	Non-ranked	Club Forster	(Australia) Forster	AU$4,380	(Australia) Dave Marland	bt.	(Australia) Craig Scarfe	(Australia) Melina van den Kieboom	bt.	(Australia) Sara Howie
March 5	Camellia Classic	Non-ranked	Wyndham Sacramento	(United States) North Highlands	$6,780	(United States) Jacob Womack	bt.	(United States) Daniel Bailey	(United States) Cassy Scantlen	bt.	(United States) Rena Rodriguez
March 9–12	Isle of Man Masters	Bronze	Villa Marina	(Isle of Man) Douglas	£3,600	(Northern Ireland) Barry Copeland	5–4	(England) Jordan Brooks	(England) Beau Greaves	5–1	(Wales) Rhian O'Sullivan
March 10–12	Isle of Man Classic	Silver	Villa Marina	(Isle of Man) Douglas	£7,060	(England) Luke Littler	5–4	(England) Martin Atkins	(England) Beau Greaves	5–2	(Wales) Rhian O'Sullivan
March 11–12	Isle of Man Open	Non-ranked	Villa Marina	(Isle of Man) Douglas	£12,130	(England) Martyn Turner	5–3	(Scotland) Ryan Hogarth	(England) Beau Greaves	5–1	(Wales) Rhian O'Sullivan
March 11	Budapest Classic	Bronze	Budapest Honvéd Sports Complex	(Hungary) Budapest	HUF1,020,000	(Netherlands) Moreno Blom	6–1	(Netherlands) Jelle Klaasen	(Hungary) Veronika Ihász	5–0	(England) Paula Jacklin
March 12	Budapest Masters	Bronze	Budapest Honvéd Sports Complex	(Hungary) Budapest	HUF1,020,000	(Netherlands) Jelle Klaasen	6–4	(Hungary) Patrik Kovács	(Hungary) Veronika Ihász	5–1	(Sweden) Maud Jansson
March 12	West Coast Classic	Non-ranked	Belmont Sport & Recreation Club	(Australia) Cloverdale	AU$3,520	(Wales) Kevin Thomas	5–0	(Australia) Trent Cooper	(Australia) Leanne Randall	5–4	(Australia) Kayleigh Pickett
March 18–19	Egypt Open	Silver	Sonesta St. George Hotel	(Egypt) Luxor	€8,000	(Bahrain) Basem Mahmood	5–0	(Germany) Simon Miebach	(Uganda) Sarah Makanga	5–0	(Egypt) Alyaa Ibrahim
March 18–19	Shediac Open	Non-ranked	Shédiac Multipurpose Centre	(Canada) Shédiac	C$2,400	(Canada) Brian Cyr	5–3	(Canada) Terry Fougere	(Canada) Darlene MacLeod	4–1	(Canada) Angela Aucoin
March 25	Virginia Beach Classic	Silver	Wyndham Virginia Beach Oceanfront	(United States) Virginia Beach	$6,725	(United States) Danny Baggish	5–1	(Republic of Ireland) Garrett French	(United States) Paula Murphy	5–2	(United States) Cali West

=== April ===
Date	Tournament	Cat.	Venue	City	Prize money	Men's			Women's		
Date	Tournament	Cat.	Venue	City	Prize money	winner	score	runner-up	winner	score	runner-up
April 1	White Mountain Shootout	Bronze	Town & Country Inn and Resort	(United States) Shelburne	$6,725	(Canada) Keith Way	5–3	(United States) Kevin Luke	(United States) Cali West	5–4	(United States) Marlise Kiel
April 1	Tórshavn Open	Bronze	Glasir Sports Hall	(Faroe Islands) Tórshavn	kr.20,400	(Sweden) Björn Lejon	5–4	(Denmark) Ivan Madsen	(Sweden) Maud Jansson	4–1	(Norway) Elin Eikesdal
April 2	Faroe Islands Open	Bronze	Glasir Sports Hall	(Faroe Islands) Tórshavn	kr.20,400	(Sweden) Edwin Torbjörnsson	5–0	(England) John Scott	(Sweden) Anna Forsmark	4–1	(Sweden) Maud Jansson
April 8	South Island Masters	Bronze	Otepuni Community Hub	(New Zealand) Invercargill	NZ$3,400	(New Zealand) Ben Robb	5–3	(New Zealand) Darren Dummigan	(New Zealand) Wendy Harper	4–2	(New Zealand) Vani Bakani
April 9	Victorian Easter Classic	Bronze	Geelong Darts Club	(Australia) Corio	AU$4,600	(Australia) Brody Klinge	7–6	(Australia) Michael Cassar	(Australia) Chrissy Sheerin	6–4	(Australia) Joanne Hadley
April 11–14	Torremolinos Open	Non-ranked	Sol Príncipe Hotel	(Spain) Torremolinos	n/a	(England) Jamie Hughes	bt.	(Spain) Jaime Núñez	(England) Laura Turner	bt.	(England) Claire Brookin
April 13–14	Torremolinos Classic	Non-ranked	Sol Príncipe Hotel	(Spain) Torremolinos	n/a	(England) Lee Stanley	bt.	(England) Jamie Hughes	(England) Maria O'Brien	bt.	(England) Paula Jacklin
April 15	Gibraltar Open	Bronze	George Federico Darts Hall	Gibraltar	£2,500	(Catalonia) Daniel Zapata	5–2	(Netherlands) Davey Monsees	(England) Christine Redhead	5–1	(Gibraltar) Tarika Ward
April 15	Estonia Open	Bronze	Radisson Blu Hotel Olümpia	(Estonia) Tallinn	€3,400	(Latvia) Valters Melderis	5–4	(Finland) Jonas Masalin	(Finland) Kirsi Viinikainen	4–2	(Finland) Kaisu Rekinen
April 16	Tallinn Open	Bronze	Radisson Blu Hotel Olümpia	(Estonia) Tallinn	€2,580	(England) John Scott	5–4	(Finland) Petri Rasmus	(Finland) Kirsi Viinikainen	4–2	(Sweden) Maud Jansson
April 15	Croatian Open	Bronze	Rebuy Stars Club	(Croatia) Zagreb	€2,580	(Belgium) Andy Baetens	5–4	(Netherlands) Jelle Klaasen	(Netherlands) Aletta Wajer	5–3	(Czech Republic) Jitka Císarová
April 16	Croatian Masters	Silver	Rebuy Stars Club	(Croatia) Zagreb	€8,000	(Belgium) Andy Baetens	5–2	(Netherlands) Jelle Klaasen	(Netherlands) Aletta Wajer	5–2	(Czech Republic) Jitka Císarová
April 15–16	Bull's German Open	Non-ranked	Wunderland Kalkar	(Germany) Kalkar	€8,665	(Netherlands) Michael Busscher	7–3	(Netherlands) Dennie Olde Kalter	(Netherlands) Sharona Veld	5–2	(Germany) Petra Zimmer
April 22	Iceland Open	Bronze	Bullseye Reykjavík	(Iceland) Reykjavík	kr154,000	(Sweden) Edwin Torbjörnsson	5–3	(Scotland) Mark Barilli	(Germany) Annegret Willkomm	5–4	(Sweden) Maud Jansson
April 23	Iceland Masters	Bronze	Bullseye Reykjavík	(Iceland) Reykjavík	kr162,000	(England) Matthew Edgar	5–3	(Sweden) Björn Lejon	(Germany) Irina Armstrong	5–2	(United States) Tracy Feiertag
April 23	North Island Masters	Bronze	Hastings Darts Association	(New Zealand) Hastings	NZ$3,820	(New Zealand) James Fergusson	5–4	(New Zealand) Craig Brown	(New Zealand) Wendy Harper	4–3	(New Zealand) Shar Maru-Habib
April 23	Murray Bridge Grand Prix	Bronze	Murray Bridge Darts Club	(Australia) White Hill	AU$5,000	(Australia) Brandon Weening	5–4	(Australia) Peter Machin	(Australia) Melina van den Kieboom	4–3	(Australia) Joanne Hadley
April 29	Denmark Open	Gold	Granly Hockey Arena	(Denmark) Esbjerg	DKK139,200	(Belgium) Andy Baetens	6–2	(Northern Ireland) Neil Duff	(Netherlands) Noa-Lynn van Leuven	5–2	(Germany) Irina Armstrong
April 30	Denmark Masters	Silver	Granly Hockey Arena	(Denmark) Esbjerg	DKK60,600	(Belgium) Andy Baetens	6–3	(England) Martyn Turner	(Wales) Rhian O'Sullivan	5–1	(Netherlands) Aletta Wajer

=== May ===
Date	Tournament	Cat.	Venue	City	Prize money	Men's			Women's		
Date	Tournament	Cat.	Venue	City	Prize money	winner	score	runner-up	winner	score	runner-up
May 6	Cleveland Extravaganza	Non-ranked	Best Western Plus	(United States) Strongsville	$2,960	(United States) Jason Watt	3–1	(United States) Larry Butler	(Canada) Maria Carli	3–2	(United States) Paula Murphy
May 6	Lithuania Open	Bronze	Žalgiris Arena	(Lithuania) Kaunas	€2,425	(England) John Scott	5–1	(Netherlands) Davy van der Zande	(England) Margaret Sutton	4–1	(Sweden) Heléne Sundelin
May 7	Kaunas Open	Bronze	Žalgiris Arena	(Lithuania) Kaunas	€2,425	(Latvia) Valters Melderis	5–1	(Lithuania) Gintaras Nagevičius	(England) Margaret Sutton	4–2	(Denmark) Anja Springborg Larsen
May 5–7	Welsh Classic	Silver	Prestatyn Sands Holiday Park	(Wales) Prestatyn	£11,600	(England) Connor Levett	5–4	(England) Antony Allen	(England) Beau Greaves	5–1	(Netherlands) Noa-Lynn van Leuven
May 7	Welsh Open	Silver	Prestatyn Sands Holiday Park	(Wales) Prestatyn	£11,600	(England) Martyn Turner	5–3	(England) Cliff Prior	(England) Beau Greaves	5–3	(Wales) Rhian O'Sullivan
May 13–14	Cyprus Classic	Bronze	Odysseia Hotel Kapetanios	(Cyprus) Limassol	€2,300	(Switzerland) Thomas Junghans	5–2	(Cyprus) Andreas Nikolaou	(Austria) Christiane Muzik	4–0	(Cyprus) Artemis Xiari
May 14	Cyprus Masters	Bronze	Odysseia Hotel Kapetanios	(Cyprus) Limassol	€3,300	(Switzerland) Thomas Junghans	5–1	(Netherlands) Erik van Manen	(Austria) Christiane Muzik	4–3	(Cyprus) Popi Atahanasiou
May 20	John Wilkie Memorial	Bronze	Hutt Valley Darts Association	(New Zealand) Taitā	NZ$4,800	(New Zealand) Haupai Puha	5–4	(New Zealand) Ben Robb	(New Zealand) Nicole Regnaud	4–3	(New Zealand) Mihi Awatere
May 25	Mongolia Open	Bronze	Triple Event Hall	(Mongolia) Ulaanbaatar	₮8,560,000	(Mongolia) Odkhüü Khundaganai	4–2	(India) Nitin Kumar	(Mongolia) Batsuuri Bolormaa	4–3	(Mongolia) Bayanmönkh Khulan
May 26	Ulaanbaatar Open	Bronze	Triple Event Hall	(Mongolia) Ulaanbaatar	₮8,560,000	(Singapore) Paul Lim	4–2	(China) Lihao Wen	(Mongolia) Batsuuri Bolormaa	4–3	(Mongolia) Bayanmönkh Khulan
May 28	Sunshine State Classic	Silver	Inala Darts Club	(Australia) Inala	AU$6,980	(Australia) Gordon Mathers	5–2	(Australia) Matt Mullen	(Australia) Melina van den Kieboom	5–3	(Australia) Joanne Hadley

=== June ===
Date	Tournament	Cat.	Venue	City	Prize money	Men's			Women's		
Date	Tournament	Cat.	Venue	City	Prize money	winner	score	runner-up	winner	score	runner-up
June 3	Swiss Open	Silver	Sporthalle Ruebisbach	(Switzerland) Kloten	€8,000	(Germany) Liam Maendl-Lawrance	5–1	(England) Aaron Turner	(Wales) Rhian O'Sullivan	5–1	(Switzerland) Sylvia Schlapbach
June 4	Helvetia Open	Silver	Sporthalle Ruebisbach	(Switzerland) Kloten	€8,000	(Germany) Liam Maendl-Lawrance	5–3	(Switzerland) Marcel Walpen	(Scotland) Sophie McKinlay	5–3	(Germany) Monique Lessmeister
June 4	Canterbury Classic	Bronze	Canterbury & Suburban Darts Assoc.	(New Zealand) Christchurch	NZ$5,475	(New Zealand) Haupai Puha	5–1	(New Zealand) Jonny Tata	(New Zealand) Nicole Regnaud	4–0	(New Zealand) Tara Mears
June 10	Oregon Open	Bronze	Embassy Suites by Hilton	(United States) Portland	$2,280	(United States) Kevin Luke	6–4	(Canada) Rory Hansen	(United States) Sally Kelly	4–3	(United States) Carole Herriott
June 10	Kassiaru Cup	Bronze	Kassiaru Puhkemaja	(Estonia) Vetepere	€3,400	(Latvia) Valters Melderis	5–2	(Sweden) Björn Lejon	(Estonia) Marika Sarrapik	4–1	(England) Margaret Sutton
June 11	Kassiaru Open	Bronze	Kassiaru Puhkemaja	(Estonia) Vetepere	€2,580	(Sweden) Edwin Torbjörnsson	5–2	(Sweden) Björn Lejon	(England) Margaret Sutton	4–3	(Sweden) Maud Jansson
June 11	Australian Masters	Silver	Geelong Darts Club	(Australia) Corio	AU$9,400	(Australia) Danny Porter	7–6	(Australia) Harley Kemp	(Australia) Corrine Hammond	6–0	(Australia) Chrissy Sheerin
June 17	Cherry Bomb International	Non-ranked	Embassy Suites by Hilton	(United States) Boca Raton	$3,600	(United States) Danny Baggish	6–5	(United States) Hossey Hicks	(United States) Paula Murphy	6–1	(United States) Cali West
June 18	New Zealand Open	Gold	Motueka Recreation Centre	(New Zealand) Motueka	NZ$14,860	(New Zealand) Haupai Puha	6–1	(New Zealand) Darren Herewini	(New Zealand) Mary-Anne Teinaki	5–4	(Australia) Kym Mitchell
June 16–18	Six Nations Cup (S)	Non-ranked	Nortel Social Club	(Northern Ireland) Newtownabbey	n/a	(Scotland) Jamie Bain	5–3	(England) Scott Mitchell	(Wales) Rhian O'Sullivan	5–3	(England) Beau Greaves
June 16–18	Six Nations Cup (T)	Non-ranked	Nortel Social Club	(Northern Ireland) Newtownabbey	n/a	Netherlands	13–10	Northern Ireland	England	5–1	Scotland
June 24	Balaton Masters	Bronze	Szent István Hotel	(Hungary) Balatonlelle	HUF1,000,000	(Austria) Hannes Schnier	bt.	(Hungary) Patrik Kovács	(Hungary) Veronika Ihász	bt.	(Hungary) Nóra Erdei
June 25	Balaton Classics	Bronze	Szent István Hotel	(Hungary) Balatonlelle	HUF1,000,000	(Austria) Hannes Schnier	bt.	(Romania) Daniel Racoveanu	(Czech Republic) Jitka Císařová	bt.	(Hungary) Nóra Erdei

=== July ===
Date	Tournament	Cat.	Venue	City	Prize money	Men's			Women's		
Date	Tournament	Cat.	Venue	City	Prize money	winner	score	runner-up	winner	score	runner-up
July 2	West Japan Cup	Bronze	Daito City Civic Hall	(Japan) Daitō	¥340,000	(Japan) Shingo Enomata	5–3	(Japan) Yuta Hayashi	(Japan) Yukie Sakaguchi	4–0	(Japan) Kanoko Takahashi
July 6–8	WDF Europe Cup Youth (S)	WDF	Courtyard by Marriott Vienna Prater/Messe	(Austria) Vienna	–	(Germany) Yorick Hofkens	6–3	(England) Thomas Banks	(Italy) Aurora Fochesato	5–2	(Turkey) Zehra Gemi
July 6–8	WDF Europe Cup Youth (T)	WDF	Courtyard by Marriott Vienna Prater/Messe	(Austria) Vienna	–	England	9–3	Hungary			
July 8	Charlotte Open	Silver	Sheraton Airport Hotel	(United States) Charlotte	$5,010	(United States) Alex Spellman	5–2	(United States) Dustin Holt	(United States) Andrea Taylor	5–0	(Canada) Trish Grzesik
July 15	New Zealand Masters	Silver	Kapi Mana Darts Association	(New Zealand) Porirua	NZ$7,550	(New Zealand) Ben Robb	5–1	(New Zealand) Haupai Puha	(New Zealand) Desi Mercer	5–1	(New Zealand) Nicole Regnaud

=== August ===
Date	Tournament	Cat.	Venue	City	Prize money	Men's			Women's		
Date	Tournament	Cat.	Venue	City	Prize money	winner	score	runner-up	winner	score	runner-up
August 5	Bud Brick Memorial	Bronze	Kase Building 158	(Japan) Chiba	¥340,000	(Japan) Ryuta Arihara	5–4	(Japan) Jun Matsuda	(Japan) Yukie Sakaguchi	5–2	(Japan) Mikuru Suzuki
August 6	Japan Open	Silver	Kase Building 158	(Japan) Chiba	¥856,000	(Japan) Jun Matsuda	5–4	(Japan) Kentaro Nishioka	(Japan) Mayumi Ouchi	5–1	(Japan) Kasumi Sato
August 5	Antwerp Open	Silver	Royal Yacht Club België	(Belgium) Antwerp	€8,000	(Netherlands) Wesley Plaisier	5–2	(England) Matthew Edgar	(England) Deta Hedman	5–4	(Germany) Monique Lessmeister
August 6	Belgium Open	Silver	Royal Yacht Club België	(Belgium) Antwerp	€8,000	(Belgium) François Schweyen	5–2	(Belgium) Andy Baetens	(Netherlands) Noa-Lynn van Leuven	5–3	(Wales) Rhian O'Sullivan
August 12	Pacific Masters	Silver	Rich River Golf Club	(Australia) Moama	AU$11,200	(Australia) Raymond Smith	6–5	(Belgium) Andy Baetens	(England) Lisa Ashton	5–1	(Australia) Angela Clarke
August 16–19	Australian Open	Platinum	Moama Bowling Club	(Australia) Moama	AU$56,000	(Belgium) Andy Baetens	10–2	(Northern Ireland) Neil Duff	(England) Lisa Ashton	8–4	(Netherlands) Aileen de Graaf
August 19	Swedish Open	Silver	Scandic Triangeln	(Sweden) Malmö	SEK100,000	(Switzerland) Thomas Junghans	6–4	(England) Darren Johnson	(England) Beau Greaves	5–4	(England) Deta Hedman
August 20	Swedish Masters	Silver	Scandic Triangeln	(Sweden) Malmö	SEK100,000	(Netherlands) Berry van Peer	6–5	(Germany) Liam Maendl-Lawrance	(England) Beau Greaves	5–2	(Finland) Kirsi Viinikainen
August 27	Murray Bridge Classic	Bronze	Murray Bridge Darts Club	(Australia) White Hill	AU$5,000	(Australia) Matt Mullen	5–1	(Australia) Josh Kime	(Australia) Kym Mitchell	4–3	(Australia) Joanne Hadley

=== September ===
Date	Tournament	Cat.	Venue	City	Prize money	Men's			Women's		
Date	Tournament	Cat.	Venue	City	Prize money	winner	score	runner-up	winner	score	runner-up
September 2	Catalonia Open	Bronze	Fábrica Llobet-Gurí	(Catalonia) Calella	€2,400	(Netherlands) Raymond van den Ende	5–4	(Netherlands) Jelle Klaasen	(Sweden) Anna Forsmark	4–3	(Belgium) Shana van Nieuwenhoven
September 3	FCD Anniversary Open	Bronze	Fábrica Llobet-Gurí	(Catalonia) Calella	€2,400	(Netherlands) Jelle Klaasen	5–1	(England) Matthew Edgar	(Belgium) Patricia De Peuter	4–1	(Belgium) Shana van Nieuwenhoven
September 2	Washington Area Open	Bronze	The Westin Washington Dulles Airport	(United States) McNair	$3,290	(United States) Stowe Buntz	5–2	(United States) Sean Mitchell	(United States) Paula Murphy	4–1	(United States) Cali West
September 8	Blueberry Hill Open	Non-ranked	Blueberry Hill	(United States) University City	$1,500	(United States) Dustin Holt	3–0	(United States) Harrison Carter	(United States) Renee Ripol	3–1	(New Zealand) Jo Steed
September 9	Finnish Open	Bronze	Scandic Helsinki Aviacongress	(Finland) Vantaa	€3,400	(Sweden) Johan Engström	5–2	(Finland) Jonas Masalin	(Finland) Kirsi Viinikainen	4–0	(Finland) Anne Kreivi
September 10	Finnish Masters	Bronze	Scandic Helsinki Aviacongress	(Finland) Vantaa	€2,710	(Sweden) Viktor Tingström	5–1	(Denmark) Brian Løkken	(Finland) Kirsi Viinikainen	4–0	(Finland) Kaisu Rekinen
September 9	Taranaki Open	Silver	Taranaki Darts Association	(New Zealand) New Plymouth	NZ$7,520	(New Zealand) Nic Southorn	5–4	(New Zealand) Ben Robb	(New Zealand) Desi Mercer	5–0	(New Zealand) Wendy Harper
September 16	Auckland Open	Bronze	Birkenhead RSA	(New Zealand) Birkdale	NZ$3,600	(New Zealand) Alan Skayman	5–2	(New Zealand) Darren Dummigan	(New Zealand) Nicole Regnaud	4–1	(New Zealand) Victoria Monaghan
September 16	Witch City Open	Silver	Courtyard by Marriott	(United States) Nashua	$6,060	(United States) Leonard Gates	5–4	(United States) Kevin Luke	(United States) Cali West	5–0	(United States) Carolyn Mars
September 16–17	British Classic	Silver	Bridlington Spa	(England) Bridlington	£7,210	(England) Luke Littler	5–0	(England) Carl Wilkinson	(England) Deta Hedman	5–2	(Netherlands) Aletta Wajer
September 17	British Open	Silver	Bridlington Spa	(England) Bridlington	£7,210	(England) Luke Littler	5–2	(England) Peter Jacques	(Wales) Eve Watson	5–1	(England) Paige Pauling
September 17	North Queensland Classic	Bronze	Mackay Darts Association	(Australia) North Mackay	AU$6,100	(Australia) Dave Marshall	5–4	(Australia) Jackson Davies	(Australia) Kathleen Martin	4–3	(Australia) Maureen Homer
September 23	Slovenia Open	Bronze	Podčetrtek Sports Hall	(Slovenia) Podčetrtek	€2,485	(England) Matthew Edgar	6–4	(Austria) Hannes Schnier	(Hungary) Veronika Ihász	6–0	(Hungary) Gréta Tekauer
September 26–30	WDF World Cup (S)	WDF	Granly Hockey Arena; Blue Water Dokken	(Denmark) Esbjerg	n/a	(Netherlands) Berry van Peer	7–3	(Germany) Frank Bruns	(England) Beau Greaves	7–5	(England) Deta Hedman
September 26–30	WDF World Cup (T)	WDF	Granly Hockey Arena; Blue Water Dokken	(Denmark) Esbjerg	n/a	Netherlands	9–7	England	Ireland	9–7	Wales
September 26–30	WDF World Cup (Y)	WDF	Granly Hockey Arena; Blue Water Dokken	(Denmark) Esbjerg	n/a	(England) Jenson Walker	6–5	(Germany) Yorick Hofkens	(England) Paige Pauling	5–2	(Republic of Ireland) Rebecca Allen

=== October ===
Date	Tournament	Cat.	Venue	City	Prize money	Men's			Women's		
Date	Tournament	Cat.	Venue	City	Prize money	winner	score	runner-up	winner	score	runner-up
October 7	Cuesoul Belfry Open	Silver	Sporthal Tempelhof	(Belgium) Bruges	€8,000	(Belgium) Andy Baetens	5–3	(Australia) Brandon Weening	(Netherlands) Aileen de Graaf	5–2	(England) Kirsty Hutchinson
October 8	Cuesoul Bruges Open	Silver	Sporthal Tempelhof	(Belgium) Bruges	€8,000	(Belgium) Andy Baetens	5–2	(Netherlands) Kristiaan de Boer	(England) Kirsty Hutchinson	5–4	(Netherlands) Aileen de Graaf
October 8	Geelong Club Classic	Bronze	Geelong Darts Club	(Australia) Corio	AU$4,820	(Australia) Dylan Oaff	7–2	(Australia) Danny Porter	(Australia) Kate Gifford	6–0	(Australia) Jade Lock
October 7–8	Klondike Open	Non-ranked	River Cree Resort & Casino	(Canada) Enoch	C$4,500	(Canada) Dawson Murschell	bt.	(Canada) Ken MacNeil	(Canada) Maria Carli	bt.	(Canada) Darlene Van Sleeuwen
October 11	Johor Open	Bronze	KSL Hotel & Resort	(Malaysia) Johor Bahru	RM11,700	(Philippines) Noel Malicdem	4–2	(Hong Kong) Man Lok Leung	(Philippines) Giselle Bulahao	3–1	(Philippines) Mymy Santos
October 12	Cosmo Malaysian Open	Bronze	KSL Hotel & Resort	(Malaysia) Johor Bahru	RM11,700	(Hong Kong) Man Lok Leung	5–4	(Philippines) Bobby Geba	(Philippines) Giselle Bulahao	3–1	(India) Mahima Bosmia
October 14	Hedgehog Hellraiser	Bronze	Mirage Sports Bar	(United States) Columbine	$1,960	(United States) Leonard Gates	5–0	(United States) Eric Gregory	(United States) Tanja Bencic	4–0	(United States) Sharon Penna
October 14	Bunbury Classic	Silver	South West Italian Club	(Australia) Bunbury	AU$7,180	(Australia) Joe Comito	5–4	(Australia) Kyle Tregoning	(Australia) Kayleigh Pickett	5–3	(Australia) Natalie Carter
October 15	Pit to Port Classic	Silver	South West Italian Club	(Australia) Bunbury	AU$7,180	(Australia) Bailey Marsh	5–2	(Australia) Dylan Dunster	(Australia) Kayleigh Pickett	5–1	(Australia) Evelyn Cockie
October 21	Thunder Bay Open	Bronze	Loyal Order of Moose Lodge	(Canada) Thunder Bay	C$3,260	(Canada) Rory Hansen	5–3	(Canada) Clint Clarkson	(Canada) Darlene Van Sleeuwen	4–1	(Canada) Tricia Wark
October 21	Alan King Memorial	Bronze	Otago Darts Association	(New Zealand) Dunedin	NZ$4,220	(New Zealand) Ben Robb	5–3	(New Zealand) Kayden Milne	(New Zealand) Nicole Regnaud	4–3	(New Zealand) Taylor-Marsh Kahaki
October 21	Latvia Open	Silver	Bellevue Park Hotel	(Latvia) Riga	€8,000	(Belgium) François Schweyen	5–2	(Sweden) Edwin Torbjörnsson	(Sweden) Maud Jansson	5–3	(Germany) Irina Armstrong
October 22	Riga Open	Bronze	Bellevue Park Hotel	(Latvia) Riga	€4,280	(Switzerland) Thomas Junghans	5–2	(Belgium) François Schweyen	(Germany) Irina Armstrong	5–3	(England) Margaret Sutton
October 28	Hungarian Classic	Bronze	Budapest Honvéd Sports Complex	(Hungary) Budapest	HUF1,004,000	(Netherlands) Jitse van der Wal	5–2	(Romania) László Kádár	(Czech Republic) Anna Votavová	4–2	(Czech Republic) Jitka Císařová
October 29	Hungarian Masters	Silver	Budapest Honvéd Sports Complex	(Hungary) Budapest	HUF3,251,500	(Hungary) Patrik Kovács	5–2	(Czech Republic) Tomáš Houdek	(Czech Republic) Anna Votavová	5–2	(Hungary) Gréta Tekauer

=== November ===
Date	Tournament	Cat.	Venue	City	Prize money	Men's			Women's		
Date	Tournament	Cat.	Venue	City	Prize money	winner	score	runner-up	winner	score	runner-up
November 4	Malta Masters	Silver	Kirkop Sports Complex	(Malta) Kirkop	€8,000	(Netherlands) Jelle Klaasen	5–3	(Scotland) Mark Barilli	(Netherlands) Noa-Lynn van Leuven	5–2	(Germany) Lena Zollikofer
November 5	Malta Open	Silver	Kirkop Sports Complex	(Malta) Kirkop	€8,000	(Netherlands) Michael Busscher	5–3	(Germany) Marcus Maier	(Netherlands) Noa-Lynn van Leuven	5–0	(Germany) Irina Armstrong
November 11	Irish Open	Gold	Gleneagle Hotel	(Republic of Ireland) Killarney	€18,400	(Republic of Ireland) Shane McGuirk	6–2	(Scotland) Ryan Hogarth	(Netherlands) Aileen de Graaf	5–3	(Wales) Rhian O'Sullivan
November 12	Irish Classic	Silver	Gleneagle Hotel	(Republic of Ireland) Killarney	€8,000	(Hong Kong) Kai Fan Leung	5–3	(Republic of Ireland) Michael Flynn	(Wales) Rhian O'Sullivan	5–0	(Netherlands) Aletta Wajer
November 11	Seacoast Open	Silver	DoubleTree by Hilton	(United States) Andover	$6,240	(United States) Alex Spellman	5–2	(United States) Leonard Gates	(Canada) Maria Carli	5–2	(United States) Andrea Taylor
November 18	Czech Open	Silver	OREA Hotel Pyramida	(Czech Republic) Prague	CZK208,000	(Belgium) Andy Baetens	5–1	(Sweden) Andreas Harrysson	(Netherlands) Aletta Wajer	5–4	(Germany) Monique Lessmeister
November 19	Ted Clements Memorial	Bronze	Levin Cosmopolitan Club	(New Zealand) Levin	NZ$4,220	(New Zealand) Haupai Puha	5–4	(New Zealand) Jonny Tata	(New Zealand) Wendy Harper	4–3	(New Zealand) Nicole Regnaud
November 25	Zlatibor Masters	Bronze	TRK Zlatibor	(Serbia) Zlatibor	€4,020	(England) Scott Walters	5–4	(Netherlands) Moreno Blom	(Hungary) Veronika Ihász	4–3	(Hungary) Gréta Tekauer
November 26	Zlatibor Classic	Bronze	TRK Zlatibor	(Serbia) Zlatibor	€4,020	(Netherlands) Moreno Blom	5–1	(Belgium) Sybren Gijbels	(Czech Republic) Anna Votavová	4–2	(Hungary) Gréta Tekauer
November 26	Alice Springs Open	Silver	Gillen Club	(Australia) Gillen	AU$25,510	(Australia) Aaron Morrison	7–5	(Australia) Lindsay Haji-Ali	(Australia) Lyn Morrison	6–5	(Australia) Joanne Hadley
November 28	Gibraltar Open	Silver	George Federico Darts Hall	Gibraltar	£9,440	(England) Luke Littler	bt.	(Scotland) Andy Boulton	(Scotland) Sophie McKinlay	5–2	(England) Paula Jacklin

=== December ===
Date	Tournament	Cat.	Venue	City	Prize money	Men's			Women's		
Date	Tournament	Cat.	Venue	City	Prize money	winner	score	runner-up	winner	score	runner-up
December 2–10	WDF World Darts Championship (S)	Platinum	Lakeside Country Club	(England) Frimley Green	£253,000	(Belgium) Andy Baetens	6–1	(Netherlands) Chris Landman	(England) Beau Greaves	4–1	(Netherlands) Aileen de Graaf
December 2–10	WDF World Darts Championship (B/G)	Platinum	Lakeside Country Club	(England) Frimley Green	£12,000	(Netherlands) Bradley van der Velden	3–0	(Republic of Ireland) Adam Dee	(Italy) Aurora Fochesato	2–0	(Hungary) Krisztina Turai
December 10	Xmas Classic	Silver	Birkdale Sports Club	(Australia) Birkdale	AU$7,000	(Australia) Jeremy Fagg	5–2	(Australia) Robbie King	(Australia) Tereasa Morris	5–2	(Australia) Amanda Loch

== Statistical information ==
The players/nations are sorted by:

1. Total number of titles;
2. Cumulated importance of those titles;
3. Alphabetical order (by family names for players).

=== Titles won by player (men's) ===
Total	Player	Category			
Total	Player	Platinum	Gold	Silver	Bronze
9	Andy Baetens (BEL)	● ●	●	● ● ● ● ●	●
5	Haupai Puha (NZL)		●	●	● ● ●
4	Luke Littler (ENG)			● ● ● ●	
4	Thomas Junghans (SUI)			●	● ● ●
3	Liam Maendl-Lawrance (GER)			● ● ●	
3	Leonard Gates (USA)			●	● ●
3	Jelle Klaasen (NED)			●	● ●
3	Ben Robb (NZL)			●	● ●
3	Valters Melderis (LAT)				● ● ●
3	Edwin Torbjörnsson (SWE)				● ● ●
2	Berry van Peer (NED)	●		●	
2	François Schweyen (BEL)			● ●	
2	Alex Spellman (USA)			● ●	
2	Moreno Blom (NED)				● ●
2	Matthew Edgar (ENG)				● ●
2	Hannes Schnier (AUT)				● ●
2	John Scott (ENG)				● ●
1	Shane McGuirk (IRE)		●		
1	Ky Smith (AUS)		●		
1	Danny Baggish (USA)			●	
1	Jason Brandon (USA)			●	
1	Jordan Brooks (ENG)			●	
1	Michael Busscher (NED)			●	
1	Joe Comito (AUS)			●	
1	Jeremy Fagg (AUS)			●	
1	László Kádár (ROM)			●	
1	Patrik Kovács (HUN)			●	
1	Kai Fan Leung (HKG)			●	
1	Connor Levett (ENG)			●	
1	Chris Lim (USA)			●	
1	Basem Mahmood (BHR)			●	
1	Bailey Marsh (AUS)			●	
1	Gordon Mathers (AUS)			●	
1	Jun Matsuda (JPN)			●	
1	Aaron Morrison (AUS)			●	
1	Wesley Plaisier (NED)			●	
1	Danny Porter (AUS)			●	
1	Raymond Smith (AUS)			●	
1	Nic Southorn (NZL)			●	
1	Martyn Turner (ENG)			●	
1	Ryuta Arihara (JPN)				●
1	Stowe Buntz (USA)				●
1	Barry Copeland (NIR)				●
1	Johan Engström (SWE)				●
1	Shingo Enomata (JPN)				●
1	James Fergusson (NZL)				●
1	Rory Hansen (CAN)				●
1	Brody Klinge (AUS)				●
1	Björn Lejon (SWE)				●
1	Man Lok Leung (HKG)				●
1	Paul Lim (SGP)				●
1	Kevin Luke (USA)				●
1	Noel Malicdem (PHI)				●
1	Dave Marshall (AUS)				●
1	Matt Mullen (AUS)				●
1	Dylan Oaff (AUS)				●
1	Khundaganai Odkhüü (MGL)				●
1	Benjamin Pratnemer (SLO)				●
1	Alan Skayman (NZL)				●
1	Gary Stone (SCO)				●
1	Viktor Tingström (SWE)				●
1	Raymond van den Ende (NED)				●
1	Jitse van der Wal (NED)				●
1	Scott Walters (ENG)				●
1	Keith Way (CAN)				●
1	Brandon Weening (AUS)				●
1	Daniel Zapata (CAT)				●

=== Titles won by nation (men's) ===
Total	Nation	Category			
Total	Nation	Platinum	Gold	Silver	Bronze
13	Australia (AUS)		●	● ● ● ● ● ● ●	● ● ● ● ●
12	England (ENG)			● ● ● ● ● ● ●	● ● ● ● ●
11	Belgium (BEL)	● ●	●	● ● ● ● ● ● ●	●
11	Netherlands (NED)	●		● ● ● ●	● ● ● ● ● ●
11	New Zealand (NZL)		●	● ● ●	● ● ● ● ● ● ●
10	United States (USA)			● ● ● ● ● ●	● ● ● ●
6	Sweden (SWE)				● ● ● ● ● ●
4	Switzerland (SUI)			●	● ● ●
3	Germany (GER)			● ● ●	
3	Japan (JPN)			●	● ●
3	Latvia (LAT)				● ● ●
2	Hong Kong (HKG)			●	●
2	Austria (AUT)				● ●
2	Canada (CAN)				● ●
1	Ireland (IRE)		●		
1	Bahrain (BHR)			●	
1	Hungary (HUN)			●	
1	Romania (ROM)			●	
1	Catalonia (CAT)				●
1	Mongolia (MGL)				●
1	Northern Ireland (NIR)				●
1	Philippines (PHI)				●
1	Singapore (SGP)				●
1	Scotland (SCO)				●
1	Slovenia (SLO)				●

=== Titles won by player (women's) ===
Total	Player	Category			
Total	Player	Platinum	Gold	Silver	Bronze
9	Beau Greaves (ENG)	●		● ● ● ● ● ●	● ●
5	Paula Murphy (USA)			● ● ●	● ●
5	Veronika Ihász (HUN)				● ● ● ● ●
4	Noa-Lynn van Leuven (NED)		●	● ● ●	
4	Wendy Harper (NZL)				● ● ● ●
4	Kirsi Viinikainen (FIN)				● ● ● ●
3	Aileen de Graaf (NED)	●	●	●	
3	Deta Hedman (ENG)			● ● ●	
3	Rhian O'Sullivan (WAL)			● ● ●	
3	Aletta Wajer (NED)			● ●	●
3	Irina Armstrong (GER)			●	● ●
3	Maud Jansson (SWE)			●	● ●
3	Anna Votavová (CZE)			●	● ●
3	Nicole Regnaud (NZL)				● ● ●
3	Margaret Sutton (ENG)				● ● ●
2	Lisa Ashton (ENG)	●		●	
2	Sophie McKinlay (SCO)			● ●	
2	Desi Mercer (NZL)			● ●	
2	Kayleigh Pickett (AUS)			● ●	
2	Melina van den Kieboom (AUS)			●	●
2	Kym Mitchell (AUS)			●	●
2	Batsuuri Bolormaa (MGL)				● ●
2	Giselle Bulahao (PHI)				● ●
2	Anna Forsmark (SWE)				● ●
2	Christiane Muzik (AUT)				● ●
2	Yukie Sakaguchi (JPN)				● ●
1	Amanda Loch (AUS)		●		
1	Mary-Anne Teinaki (NZL)		●		
1	Maria Carli (CAN)			●	
1	Corrine Hammond (AUS)			●	
1	Kirsty Hutchinson (ENG)			●	
1	Sarah Makanga (UGA)			●	
1	Tereasa Morris (AUS)			●	
1	Lyn Morrison (AUS)			●	
1	Mayumi Ouchi (JPN)			●	
1	Andrea Taylor (USA)			●	
1	Eve Watson (WAL)			●	
1	Cali West (USA)			●	
1	Tanja Bencic (USA)				●
1	Jitka Císařová (CZE)				●
1	Patricia De Peuter (BEL)				●
1	Kate Gifford (AUS)				●
1	Sally Kelly (USA)				●
1	Kathleen Martin (AUS)				●
1	Christine Redhead (ENG)				●
1	Marika Sarrapik (EST)				●
1	Chrissy Sheerin (AUS)				●
1	Darlene Van Sleeuwen (CAN)				●
1	Annegret Willkomm (GER)				●

=== Titles won by nation (women's) ===
Total	Nation	Category			
Total	Nation	Platinum	Gold	Silver	Bronze
19	England (ENG)	● ●		● ● ● ● ● ● ● ● ● ● ●	● ● ● ● ● ●
13	Australia (AUS)		●	● ● ● ● ● ● ●	● ● ● ● ●
10	Netherlands (NED)	●	● ●	● ● ● ● ● ●	●
10	New Zealand (NZL)		●	● ●	● ● ● ● ● ● ●
9	United States (USA)			● ● ● ● ●	● ● ● ●
5	Sweden (SWE)			●	● ● ● ●
5	Hungary (HUN)				● ● ● ● ●
4	Wales (WAL)			● ● ● ●	
4	Czech Republic (CZE)			●	● ● ●
4	Germany (GER)			●	● ● ●
4	Finland (FIN)				● ● ● ●
3	Japan (JPN)			●	● ●
2	Scotland (SCO)			● ●	
2	Canada (CAN)			●	●
2	Austria (AUT)				● ●
2	Mongolia (MGL)				● ●
2	Philippines (PHI)				● ●
1	Uganda (UGA)			●	
1	Belgium (BEL)				●
1	Estonia (EST)				●
