= Houdek (surname) =

Houdek (Czech feminine: Houdková) is a Czech surname. Notable people with the surname include:

- Dan Houdek (born 1989), Czech footballer
- Dušan Houdek (born 1931), Czech sports shooter
- Jacques Houdek (born 1981), Croatian singer
- Tomáš Houdek (ice hockey) (born 1981), Czech ice hockey player
- Tomáš Houdek (darts player) (born 2003), Czech darts player
- Václav Houdek (1906–1957), Slovak architect
