= Tomáš Houdek =

Tomáš Houdek may refer to:

- Tomáš Houdek (ice hockey)
- Tomáš Houdek (darts player)
