= 2012 PDC World Youth Championship =

Tournament information
- Dates: 4 November 2011; 17 May 2012 (final)
- Venue: The O2 Arena
- Location: London
- Country: England
- Organisation(s): PDC
- Format: Legs, first to 5, first to 6 (final)
- Prize fund: £30,000
- Winner's share: £10,000

Champion(s)
- (England) James Hubbard

The 2012 PDC World Youth Championship was the second edition of the PDC World Youth Championship, a tournament organised by the Professional Darts Corporation for darts players aged between 14 and 23.

The knock-out stages from the last 64 to the semi-finals were played in Crawley on 4 November 2011 and weren't broadcast live on TV. The final took place on 17 May 2012, before the final of the 2012 Premier League Darts, which was shown live on Sky Sports. The two finalists became PDC Pro Tour card holders for 2012 and 2013, and also received invitations to the 2011 Grand Slam of Darts.

Arron Monk was the defending champion, but he lost to Matthew Dicken in the first round. Michael van Gerwen, who lost the 2010 final, and James Hubbard contested the final at The O2 Arena, London. Hubbard won in the final 6–3.

== Prize money ==
| Position (no. of players) | | Prize money (Total: £30,000) |
|---|---|---|
| Winner | (1) | £10,000 |
| Runner-up | (1) | £5,000 |
| Semi-finalists | (2) | £2,500 |
| Quarter-finalists | (4) | £1,250 |
| Third round | (8) | £625 |
| Second round | (16) | £0 |
| First round | (32) | £0 |

== Qualification ==
The tournament featured 64 players. The top 28 players in the PDC Youth Tour Order of Merit automatically qualified for the tournament, with the top eight players being seeded. They were joined by qualifiers from 26 Rileys Dart Zone tournaments throughout the United Kingdom, as well as 10 international qualifiers.

The participants were:

1-28

1. (Netherlands) Michael van Gerwen
2. (England) Paul Barham
3. (England) Joe Cullen
4. (England) Shaun Griffiths
5. (England) Michael Smith
6. (England) Reece Robinson
7. (England) Chris Aubrey
8. (England) Ricky Evans
9. (England) Adam Smith-Neale
10. (Netherlands) Co Stompé Jr
11. (England) Ryan Harrington
12. (England) Adam Hunt
13. (England) Steve Haggerty
14. (England) Josh Jones
15. (Netherlands) Dirk van Duijvenbode
16. (England) Curtis Hammond
17. (Republic of Ireland) David Coyne
18. (England) Arron Monk
19. (England) Sam Hill
20. (Netherlands) Gino Vos
21. (England) Ash Khayat
22. (England) David Pallett
23. (Wales) Jamie Lewis
24. (England) Jamie Landon
25. (England) Jonathan Mulley
26. (Netherlands) Jimmy Hendriks
27. (England) Darren Whittingham
28. (Wales) Nick Kenny

Rileys qualifiers

- (England) Steven Addison
- (Scotland) Michael Airnes
- (England) Leon Bailey
- (England) Liam Deveries
- (England) Matthew Dicken
- (England) Rhys Dudley
- (England) Nicholas Ellis
- (Wales) Marc Evans
- (England) Michael Finch
- (England) Matt Gallett
- (England) James Hajdar
- (England) Lee Hodson
- (England) Matt Howard

Rileys qualifiers

- (England) Joe Hunt
- (Scotland) Ryan Hogarth
- (England) James Hubbard
- (England) Thomas Humphrey
- (England) Aden Kirk
- (England) Daniel King-Morris
- (England) Richard North
- (Wales) Kurt Parry
- ~~(Scotland) Jamie Reid~~
- (England) Benjamin Songhurst
- (England) James Thompson
- (England) Brandon Walsh
- (England) David Williams

International qualifiers

- (Australia) Robbie King
- (Australia) Guy Holland
- (Republic of Ireland) Ryan Maher
- (Canada) Shaun Narain
- (Finland) Teemu Harju
- (Sweden) Oskar Lukasiak
- (Austria) Franz Schrammel
- (Spain) Sergio Garcia
- (Germany) Max Hopp
- (Netherlands) John de Kruijf
- (Philippines) Alexis Toylo

== Draw ==
=== Preliminary round ===
- (Wales) Kurt Parry 5–4 (Philippines) Alexis Toylo

=== Last 64 ===
First round (best of 9 legs); 4 November 2011
1 | (Netherlands) Michael van Gerwen | 5
(Netherlands) John de Kruijf | 1
(Wales) Kurt Parry | 5
(England) Thomas Humphrey | 1
(Republic of Ireland) David Coyne | 0
(England) Adam Hunt | 5
(Netherlands) Gino Vos | 5
(England) Curtis Hammond | 2
8 | (England) Ricky Evans | 5
(England) Benjamin Songhurst | 3
(England) Aden Kirk | 5
(England) Steve Haggerty | 0
(England) Liam Deveries | 2
(Wales) Marc Evans | 5
(England) Darren Whittingham | 5
(Canada) Shaun Narain | 4
5 | (England) Michael Smith | 3
(England) Ash Khayat | 5
(Wales) Nick Kenny
bye
(England) Jonathan Mulley | 1
(Germany) Max Hopp | 5
(England) Sam Hill | 5
(England) Josh Jones | 4
4 | (England) Shaun Griffiths | 5
(Republic of Ireland) Ryan Maher | 2
(Scotland) Ryan Hogarth | 5
(England) Lee Hodson | 0
(England) Matthew Dicken | 5
(England) Arron Monk | 2
(Netherlands) Jimmy Hendriks | 5
(Australia) Guy Holland | 2
2 | (England) Paul Barham | 5
(England) David Williams | 3
(England) Joe Hunt | 5
(England) Daniel King-Morris | 0
(Austria) Franz Schrammel | 3
(Spain) Sergio Garcia | 5
(England) Leon Bailey | 5
(England) Adam Smith-Neale | 4
7 | (England) Chris Aubrey | 2
(England) Rhys Dudley | 5
(England) Ryan Harrington | 1
(Finland) Teemu Harju | 5
(Netherlands) Co Stompé Jr | 2
(England) Matt Howard | 5
(England) Brandon Walsh | 5
(England) Richard North | 4
6 | (England) Reece Robinson | 5
(England) James Thompson | 3
(England) David Pallett | 2
(Wales) Jamie Lewis | 5
(England) James Hajdar | 1
(Sweden) Oskar Lukasiak | 5
(England) Steven Addison | 3
(England) Jamie Landon | 5
3 | (England) Joe Cullen | 5
(England) Nicholas Ellis | 2
(England) Michael Finch | 0
(Netherlands) Dirk van Duijvenbode | 5
(England) Matt Gallett | 5
(Australia) Robbie King | 0
(England) James Hubbard | 5
(Scotland) Michael Airnes | 1

Second round (best of 9 legs); 4 November 2011
1 | (Netherlands) Michael van Gerwen | 5
(Wales) Kurt Parry | 3
(England) Adam Hunt | 4
(Netherlands) Gino Vos | 5
8 | (England) Ricky Evans | 2
(England) Aden Kirk | 5
(Wales) Marc Evans | 0
(England) Darren Whittingham | 5
(England) Ash Khayat | 5
(Wales) Nick Kenny | 4
(Germany) Max Hopp | 0
(England) Sam Hill | 5
4 | (England) Shaun Griffiths | 5
(Scotland) Ryan Hogarth | 4
(England) Matthew Dicken | 5
(Netherlands) Jimmy Hendriks | 3
2 | (England) Paul Barham | 5
(England) Joe Hunt | 1
(Spain) Sergio Garcia | 5
(England) Leon Bailey | 3
(England) Rhys Dudley | 5
(Finland) Teemu Harju | 3
(England) Matt Howard | 1
(England) Brandon Walsh | 5
6 | (England) Reece Robinson | 4
(Wales) Jamie Lewis | 5
(Sweden) Oskar Lukasiak | 3
(England) Jamie Landon | 5
3 | (England) Joe Cullen | 4
(Netherlands) Dirk van Duijvenbode | 5
(England) Matt Gallett | 3
(England) James Hubbard | 5

Third round (best of 9 legs); 4 November 2011
1 | (Netherlands) Michael van Gerwen | 5
(Netherlands) Gino Vos | 4
(England) Aden Kirk | 1
(England) Darren Whittingham | 5
(England) Ash Khayat | 3
(England) Sam Hill | 5
4 | (England) Shaun Griffiths | 5
(England) Matthew Dicken | 3
2 | (England) Paul Barham | 5
(Spain) Sergio Garcia | 3
(England) Rhys Dudley | 5
(England) Brandon Walsh | 3
(Wales) Jamie Lewis | 5
(England) Jamie Landon | 3
(Netherlands) Dirk van Duijvenbode | 4
(England) James Hubbard | 5

Quarter-finals (best of 9 legs); 4 November 2011
1 | (Netherlands) Michael van Gerwen | 5
(England) Darren Whittingham | 3
(England) Sam Hill | 3
4 | (England) Shaun Griffiths | 5
2 | (England) Paul Barham | 5
(England) Rhys Dudley | 1
(Wales) Jamie Lewis | 4
(England) James Hubbard | 5

Semi-finals (best of 9 legs); 4 November 2011
1 | (Netherlands) Michael van Gerwen | 5
4 | (England) Shaun Griffiths | 3
2 | (England) Paul Barham | 2
(England) James Hubbard | 5

Final (best of 11 legs); 17 May 2012
1 | (Netherlands) Michael van Gerwen | 3
(England) James Hubbard | 6
