= Houdek =

Houdek may refer to:

- Houdek (soil), a type of soil
- Houdek (surname)
