= Oskar Lukasiak =

Swedish darts player (born 1991)

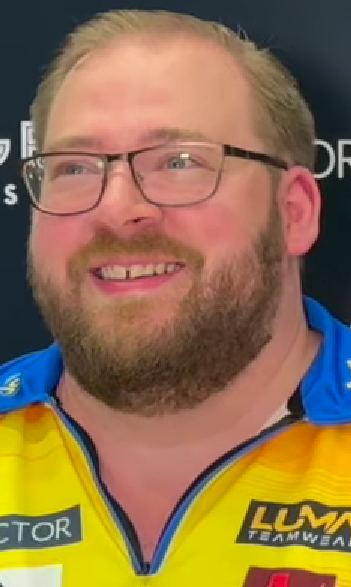
- Lukasiak in 2024

Personal information
- Full name: Oskar Mikko Lukasiak
- Born: 27 October 1991 (age 35) Uppsala, Sweden

Sport
- Sport: Darts
- Playing since: 2001
- Darts: 22g Mission
- Laterality: Right-handed
- Walk-on music: "Give Me Everything" by Pitbull featuring Ne-Yo, Afrojack and Nayer

Organisation (see split in darts)
- BDO: 2004–2019
- PDC: 2017–present (Tour Card: 2025–present)
- WDF: 2004–2019, 2023
- Current world ranking: (PDC) 84 ▼1 (29 October 2026)

WDF major events – best performances
- World Masters: Last 32: 2016

PDC premier events – best performances
- World Championship: Last 128: 2026
- UK Open: Last 32: 2026

Other tournament wins
- Years
Latvia Open	2007
PDC Challenge Tour	2024
PDC Nordic & Baltic Tour	2024; 2025; 2026
Youth events
BDO World Masters	2004
Medal record
Men's Darts
Representing Sweden
WDF Europe Cup
Gold medal – first place	2018 Budapest	Men's team
Bronze medal – third place	2016 Egmond aan Zee	Men's pairs
WDF Europe Youth Cup
Gold medal – first place	2009 Veldhoven	Boys singles
Gold medal – first place	2009 Veldhoven	Boys pairs
Gold medal – first place	2009 Veldhoven	Boys overall
Silver medal – second place	2009 Veldhoven	Boys team

Oskar Mikko Lukasiak (born 27 October 1991) is a Swedish darts player who competes in Professional Darts Corporation (PDC) events. He won a PDC Tour Card at 2025 Q-School, having previously won 2024 PDC Challenge Tour 3. He has won three titles on the PDC Nordic and Baltic Tour. He also won the 2004 World Youth Masters.

== Career ==
=== Early career ===
Lukasiak hit a nine-dart finish during a boys' game at the 2004 Denmark Open aged 12-years-old, making him the youngest player to achieve the feat in an official competition. He won the 2004 World Masters Boys title, defeating Jonny Nijs of the Netherlands 4–1 in the final.

In 2009, Lukasiak represented Sweden at the 2009 WDF Europe Youth Cup, where he won the boys singles tournament by defeating Wales' Jamie Lewis in the final. He also won the boys pairs tournament with Edwin Torbjörnsson and the boys overall gold medal with Sweden, along with a final in the boys team event.

In 2012, Lukasiak won the Swedish qualifier for the 2012 PDC World Youth Championship. At the tournament, he beat James Hajdar 5–1 in the first round but lost to Jamie Landon 5–3 in next round.

=== 2023–2024 ===
Lukasiak qualified for his first PDC European Tour event in 2023 when he won the PDC Nordic & Baltic qualifier for the 2023 German Darts Grand Prix. He lost to Gabriel Clemens in the first round. Lukasiak represented Sweden at the 2023 PDC World Cup of Darts alongside Dennis Nilsson. They qualified from the group stage and defeated Canada 8–5 in the Last 16, marking Sweden's first appearance in the quarter-finals in the event's history. The Swedish duo lost to the eventual champions Gerwyn Price and Jonny Clayton of Wales 8–5.

In 2024, Lukasiak won his first PDC Challenge Tour title after defeating Danny Jansen 5–3 in the final of Event Three. He partnered Jeffrey de Graaf at the 2024 PDC World Cup of Darts, where they made the quarter-finals before losing to the Scottish team of Peter Wright and Gary Anderson in a deciding leg 8–7.

=== 2025 ===
Lukasiak won a PDC Tour Card at 2025 Q-School after finishing fourth in the European Q-School Order of Merit.

== World Championship results ==
=== PDC World Championship ===
- 2026: First round (lost to Dom Taylor 0-3)

== Performance timeline ==
=== BDO ===
Tournament	2009	2010	2011	2012	2016	2018
World Masters	2R	1R	1R	2R	5R	4R

=== PDC ===
Tournament	2023	2024	2025	2026
PDC Ranked televised events
World Championship	DNQ			1R
World Masters	DNQ		Prel.	Prel.
UK Open	DNQ		1R	5R
PDC Non-ranked televised events
World Cup of Darts	QF	QF	2R	2R
Career statistics
Season-end ranking (PDC)	212	169	125	

==== European Tour ====
Tournament	2023	2025	2026
European Grand Prix	DNQ		2R
German Grand Prix	1R	DNQ	
Swiss Trophy	DNQ	1R	DNQ

==== Players Championships ====
Season	1	2	3	4	5	6	7	8	9	10	11	12	13	14	15	16	17	18	19	20	21	22	23	24	25	26	27	28	29	30	31	32	33	34
2024 (Note: Not a Tour card holder)	WIG; 1R	WIG; 3R	LEI; 2R	LEI; 2R	HIL; 1R	HIL; 2R	LEI; 1R	LEI; 1R	HIL; 1R	HIL; 1R	Did not participate																							
2025	WIG; 1R	WIG; 1R	ROS; 3R	ROS; 1R	LEI; 1R	LEI; 2R	HIL; 1R	HIL; 1R	LEI; 1R	LEI; 2R	LEI; 1R	LEI; 2R	ROS; 1R	ROS; 2R	HIL; 1R	HIL; 1R	LEI; 2R	LEI; 1R	LEI; 1R	LEI; 1R	LEI; 1R	HIL; DNP		MIL; 2R	MIL; 1R	HIL; 1R	HIL; 1R	LEI; DNP			WIG; 1R	WIG; 1R	WIG; 1R	WIG; 1R
2026	HIL; 1R	HIL; 1R	WIG; 1R	WIG; 1R	LEI; 1R	LEI; 1R	LEI; 1R	LEI; 1R	WIG; DNP		MIL; 1R	MIL; 1R	DNP				LEI; 1R	LEI; 1R	MIL; 1R	MIL; 3R	DNP				HIL; 2R	HIL; 3R	LEI; 2R	LEI; 1R	ROS; QF	ROS; 2R	ROS; 2R	ROS; 1R	LEI; 2R	LEI; 1R

==== Nordic & Baltic Tour ====
Season	1	2	3	4	5	6	7	8	9	10	11	12
2020	L16	QF										
2022	L32	L64	Did not participate									
2023	QF	QF	QF	L16	L64	QF	L128	QF	L32	L16		
2024	QF	L16	F	L32	QF	F	L16	W	L16	QF		
2025	W	SF	QF	L16	QF	F	QF	QF	L16	F	F	L16
2026	QF	F	QF	L16	L32	L64	L16	SF	QF	W	L16	QF

Performance Table Legend
W	Won the tournament	F	Finalist	SF	Semifinalist	QF	Quarterfinalist	#R; RR; Prel.	Lost in # round Round-robin; Preliminary round	DQ	Disqualified
DNQ	Did not qualify	DNP	Did not participate	WD	Withdrew	NH	Tournament not held	#R; RR; Prel.	Lost in # round Round-robin; Preliminary round	NYF	Not yet founded
