= Ayşegül Karagöz =

Turkish darts player (born 2010)

Personal information
- Nickname: "White Wolf"
- Born: 27 June 2010 (age 16) Denizli, Turkey

Sport
- Sport: Darts
- Playing since: 2020
- Darts: 21g

Organisation (see split in darts)
- WDF: 2022–present
- Current world ranking: (WDF) NR (17 August 2026)

WDF major events – best performances
- World Championship: Champion 2025
Medal record
Women's Darts
Representing Turkey
WDF World Cup
Gold medal – first place	2025 Seoul	girls' singles
WDF Europe Youth Cup
Bronze medal – third place	2025 Assen	girls' singles
Gold medal – first place	2025 Assen	girls' team
WDF Tournaments
Silver medal – second place	2026 Vienna (Bronze)	yoth singles
Gold medal – first place	2026 Assen	girls' pairs

Ayşegül Karagöz (born 27 June 2010) is a Turkish darts player who competes in World Darts Federation (WDF) events.

== Sport career ==
Karagöz started playing darts in 2021.

In 2025, she won the bronze medal in the girls's singles event and the gold medal in the girls' team event with Ceylin Ataş at the WDF Europe Youth Cup in Assen, Netherlands. The same year, she won the gold medal in the girls' singles event at the WDF World Cup in Seoul, South Korea.

In February 2026, she won the gold medal in the girls' pairs event with Zehra Gemi at the Dutch Open in Assen, Netherlands In March 2026, she won the silver medal in the women's event at the WDF Youth Challenge of the WDF's bronze category in Vienna, Austria losing to her countrygirl Zehra Gemi in the final.

== Personal life ==
Karagöz is a native of Denizli, western Turkey. She is a student of Necla-Ergun Abalıoğlu Trade Vocational and Technical Anatolian High School in her hometown.
