= 2022 WDF Europe Cup Youth =

WDF Europe Cup Youth

Tournament information
- Dates: 14–17 July 2022
- Venue: Budapesti Honvéd Sportegyesület
- Location: Budapest
- Country: Hungary
- Organisation(s): WDF
- Format: Legs

Champion(s)
- Singles; Luke Littler (boys U18); Tomáš Houdek (boys U21); Aurora Fochesato (girls U18); Anick Sonnichsen (girls U21); Pairs; England (boys U18); Czechia (boys U21); Hungary (girls U18); Denmark (girls U21); Team; England (boys U18); Czechia (boys U21); Overall; England (boys U18); Czechia (boys U21); England (girls U18); Denmark (girls U21)

The 2022 WDF Europe Cup Youth was the 31st edition of the WDF Europe Cup Youth organised by the World Darts Federation. The tournament was held at the Budapesti Honvéd Sportegyesület in Budapest, Hungary. Due to the cancellation of tournaments in 2020–2021 because the COVID-19 pandemic, it was decided to organize an additional tournament (WDF Europe U21 Cup) for players under 21 years of age. Medals were distributed in twelve disciplines (singles, pairs and overalls) appropriately for each of the sex and cups and also two boys tournaments for every cups.

== Medal tally ==
* Host nation (Hungary)

Rank	Nation	Gold	Silver	Bronze	Total
1	England (ENG)	5	2	3	10
2	Czech Republic (CZE)	4	1	1	6
3	Denmark (DEN)	3	0	0	3
4	Hungary (HUN)*	1	3	6	10
5	Italy (ITA)	1	0	2	3
6	Germany (GER)	0	2	3	5
7	Netherlands (NED)	0	2	2	4
8	Turkey (TUR)	0	2	1	3
9	Austria (AUT)	0	1	3	4
10	Ireland (IRL)	0	1	2	3
11	Slovakia (SVK)	0	0	1	1
Totals (11 entries)		14	14	24	52

== Qualifiers ==
19 countries/associations entered a team in the event. Not all teams took part in all events.

Austria
Czechia
Denmark
England
Finland
Germany
Gibraltar
Hungary
Iceland
Ireland
Italy
Latvia
Netherlands
Northern Ireland
Scotland
Slovakia
Sweden
Turkey
Wales

== Draw for U18 ==
=== Boys singles ===
Quarter-finals (best of 7 legs); 15 July
(England) Thomas Banks	2
Luke Littler	4
Connor Hopkins	3
András Borbély	4
Bradly Roes	1
Archie Self	4
Pim van Bijnen	4
Keanan Norris	3

Semi-finals (best of 9 legs); 15 July
Luke Littler	5
András Borbély	3
Archie Self	5
Pim van Bijnen	3

Final (best of 11 legs); 16 July
Luke Littler 87.63	6
Archie Self 77.25	1

=== Girls singles ===
Quarter-finals (best of 7 legs); 15 July
Paige Pauling	4
Sophie McKinlay	3
Iida Lanko	1
Amelia Evans	4
Havva Nur Karaman	3
Zehra Gemi	4
Michaela Jamnická	1
Aurora Fochesato	4

Semi-finals (best of 7 legs); 15 July
Paige Pauling	3
Amelia Evans	4
[[Zehra Gemi]][[Category:Pages using DartsRankings with missing player data|Zehra Gemi]]	2
Aurora Fochesato	4

Final (best of 9 legs); 16 July
Amelia Evans 59.16	1
Aurora Fochesato 65.43	5

=== Boys pairs ===
Quarter-finals (best of 9 legs); 12 June
England; Thomas Banks, Charlie Manby	4
Czech Republic; Matěj Malach, Matyáš Rejhon	1
England; Luke Littler, Archie Self	4
Ireland; Adam Dee, Keanan Norris	2
Netherlands; Dylan van Lierop, Bradly Roes	4
Hungary; András Borbély, Dávid Dobos	3
Slovakia; Matej Čverha, Dominik Kočik	4
Wales; Cole Davey, Ieuan Halsall	1

Semi-finals (best of 3 sets); 12 June
England	4
England	1
Netherlands	4
Slovakia	2

Final (best of 5 sets); 12 June
England	5
Netherlands	2

=== Girls pairs ===
Quarter-finals (best of 9 legs); 12 June
Italy; Elisa Bolzicco, Aurora Fochesato	3
Finland; Siisa Laitinen, Iida Lanko	2
Hungary; Tamara Kovács, Krisztina Turai	3
Germany; Marlene Klupsch, Wibke Riemann	1
England; Amy Evans, Paige Pauling	3
Scotland; Sophie McKinlay, Brown	1
Turkey; Zehra Gemi, Havva Nur Karaman	3
Netherlands; Chantal Tessin, Roos van der Velde	1

Semi-finals (best of 3 sets); 12 June
Italy	1
Hungary	3
England	0
Turkey	3

Final (best of 5 sets); 12 June
Hungary	4
Turkey	2

=== Boys teams ===
Quarter-finals (first to 9 matches); 17 July
England	9
Gibraltar	1
Italy	9
Wales	5
Netherlands	9
Austria	3
Czechia	8
Ireland	9

Semi-finals (first to 9 matches); 17 July
England	9
Italy	1
Netherlands	6
Ireland	9

Final (first to 9 matches); 17 July
England	9
Ireland	0

== Draw for U21 ==
=== Boys singles ===
Quarter-finals (best of 9 legs); 12 June
Vilem Sedivy	2
Patrik Helfrich	4
Ben McCaffrey	2
Tomáš Houdek	4
David Zaruba	4
Sebastian Fohringer	0
Dominik Grüllich	4
Marcel Steinacher	2

Semi-finals (best of 3 sets); 12 June
Patrik Helfrich	2
Tomáš Houdek	5
David Zaruba	5
Dominik Grüllich	0

Final (best of 5 sets); 12 June
Tomáš Houdek 75.60	6
David Zaruba 76.23	5

=== Girls singles ===
Semi-finals (best of 3 sets); 12 June
Gréta Tekauer	4
Julia Siek	1
Anick Sonnichsen	4
Tabea Branka	1

Final (best of 5 sets); 12 June
Gréta Tekauer 46.71	0
Anick Sonnichsen 56.49	5

== Overall champions ==
Category	Medals			Details
Category	Gold	Silver	Bronze	Details
Men's U18	England	Netherlands	Ireland	
Men's U21	Czechia	Hungary	Austria	
Women's U18	England	Turkey	Hungary	
Women's U21	Denmark	Germany	Hungary	
