= Dan Houdek =

Czech footballer (born 1989)

Personal information
- Full name: Dan Houdek
- Date of birth: 21 August 1989 (age 37)
- Place of birth: Czechoslovakia
- Height: 1.92 m (6 ft 4 in)
- Position: Goalkeeper

Team information
- Current team: TJ Jiskra Domažlice

Senior career*
Years	Team	Apps	(Gls)
2007–2011	FC Viktoria Plzeň	0	(0)
2010	→ FC Zenit Čáslav (loan)	7	(0)
- * Club domestic league appearances and goals as of 30 June 2011

Dan Houdek (born 21 August 1989) is a Czech footballer. His position is goalkeeper. He played in the Czech 2. Liga.
