= Václav Houdek =

Slovak architect

- Born: 5 September 1906; Blovice, Austria-Hungary
- Died: 2 April 1957 (aged 50); Bratislava, Czechoslovakia
- Occupation: Architect

Václav Houdek (5 September 1906 – 2 April 1957) was a Slovak architect. His work was part of the architecture event in the art competition at the 1936 Summer Olympics.
