= Aurora Fochesato =

Italian darts player

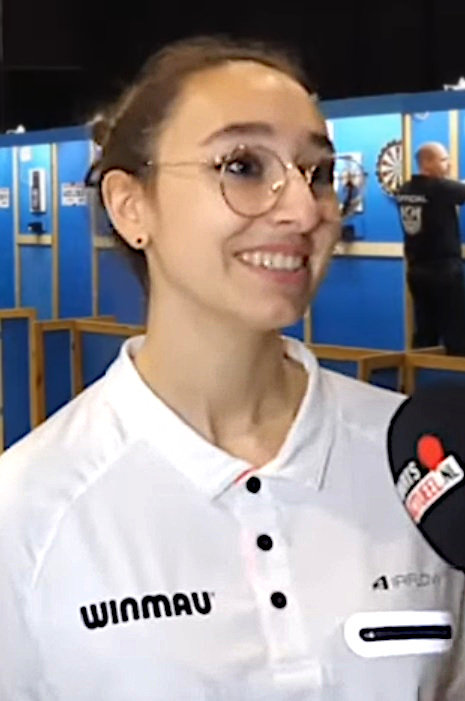
- Fochesato in 2022

Personal information
- Full name: Aurora Fochesato
- Nickname: "Aury"
- Born: 1 January 2006 (age 20) Pordenone, Italy
- Home town: Pordenone, Italy

Sport
- Sport: Darts
- Playing since: 2017
- Darts: 20g Winmau
- Laterality: Right-handed
- Walk-on music: "The Nights" by Avicii

Organisation (see split in darts)
- PDC: 2022–
- WDF: 2021–
- Current world ranking: (WDF W) 27 (17 August 2026)

WDF major events – best performances
- World Masters: Runner-up: 2026
- Dutch Open: Last 32: 2022

Other tournament wins
- Years
WDF World Girls Ch'ship	2023
International Youth Challenge	2022, 2023
Italian Championship	2021, 2022, 2025
Medal record
Women's Darts
Representing Italy
EDF European Championship
Gold medal – first place	2023 Podčetrtek	Women's singles
Gold medal – first place	2025 Podčetrtek	Women's doubles
Gold medal – first place	2025 Podčetrtek	Mixed doubles
Silver medal – second place	2021 Podčetrtek	Mixed doubles
Silver medal – second place	2024 Podčetrtek	Women's singles
Bronze medal – third place	2021 Podčetrtek	Women's singles
WDF Europe Cup Youth
Gold medal – first place	2022 Budapest	Girls singles
Gold medal – first place	2023 Vienna	Girls singles
Silver medal – second place	2024 Riga	Girls singles
Bronze medal – third place	2022 Budapest	Girls pairs
Bronze medal – third place	2023 Vienna	Girls pairs

Aurora Fochesato (born 1 January 2006) is an Italian professional darts player who plays in World Darts Federation (WDF) events. She was the first gold medalist from Italy in the World Darts Federation Europe Cup, and also an EDF European Champion, and was the first Italian to win the WDF Youth Girls World Darts Championship in 2023.

== Career ==
Aurora's career in darts began in 2017, when she started to participate in local darts tournaments in Italy. In 2021, she reached the final of the Malta Open, but was defeated by Paula Jacklin 5–4 in a last-leg decider. In 2022, she took a part in the WDF Europe Cup Youth, where she defeated Amy Evans 5–1 and won a gold medal in the singles girls competition. In the pairs competition with Elisa Bolzicco, she achieved a bronze medal, but lost 3–1 in the semi-finals to eventual champions Tamara Kovács and Krisztina Turai from Hungary.

In 2023, she was selected by the national federation to participate in the 2023 WDF Europe Cup Youth. On the first day of the pairs competition, she won the bronze medal for the second time in her career. Her partner was Giada Macchi. In the semi-finals, after an extremely tight match, they finally lost to the England team (Hannah Meek and Paige Pauling). In the singles competition final against Zehra Gemi, she won a second gold medal after a 5–2 victory.

In 2023, she became the first Italian to win the WDF Youth Girls World Darts Championship, defeating the Hungarian Krisztina Turai in the final 2 - 0.

She played on the 2024 PDC Women's Series, and reached the last 16 at event 22. She lost there to Noa-Lynn van Leuven 4–2.

== Performance timeline ==
Tournament	2022	2024	2025	2026
WDF Ranked televised events
Dutch Open	4R	DNP		
World Masters	DNQ	2R	3R	F
