= Six Nations Cup =

Tournament information
- Established: 2002
- Organisation(s): World Darts Federation
- Format: Legs
- Month(s) Played: June

Current champion(s)
- England (men); England (women)

The Six Nations Cup is an international darts team competition which is organised by the host nation's dart organisation, run under the auspices of the World Darts Federation (WDF). It is competed for by the national teams of England, the Netherlands, Northern Ireland, Republic of Ireland, Scotland and Wales.

== Background ==
This competition was first held in 2002 as a men's only competition, but in 2010 it held as a women's competition for the first time. The tournament was formerly held annually on the last weekend of February at varying venues in one of the competing countries, which are decided in joint meetings. The national darts organisation of the host country will organise that years competition. The competition must not be staged in the same country that is hosting that years annual British International Championships.

Following the COVID-19 pandemic, which saw both the 2020 and 2021 editions cancelled, the Six Nations has moved to mid-June.

Each national darts organisation names a squad that's consists of six men and four women, out of which any five men and three women may play in any match, with one player on standby for each squad (for both the men and women).

The six nations are divided into two groups of three. The top two teams from each group advance to the semi-finals. Prior to both semi finals and the final, a 5th/6th place play-off takes place between both groups bottom teams. The format is the same for both the men and women.

== Winners ==
| Year | | Champions | Hosts |
|---|---|---|---|
| 2002 | Men | Scotland | Northern Ireland |
| 2003 | Men | Scotland | Wales |
| 2004 | Men | England | Republic of Ireland |
| 2005 | Men | England | Scotland |
| 2006 | Men | England | England |
| 2007 | Men | England | Netherlands |
| 2008 | Men | Wales | Wales |
| 2009 | Men | England | Northern Ireland |
| 2010 | Men | England | Republic of Ireland |
| 2010 | Women | England | Republic of Ireland |
| 2011 | Men | England | Scotland |
| 2011 | Women | Wales | Scotland |
| 2012 | Men | England | England |
| 2012 | Women | England | England |
| 2013 | Men | Netherlands | Netherlands |
| 2013 | Women | Wales | Netherlands |
| 2014 | Men | England | Wales |
| 2014 | Women | England | Wales |
| 2015 | Men | England | Northern Ireland |
| 2015 | Women | Wales | Northern Ireland |
| 2016 | Men | England | Republic of Ireland |
| 2016 | Women | England | Republic of Ireland |
| 2017 | Men | England | Scotland |
| 2017 | Women | England | Scotland |
| 2018 | Men | Netherlands | England |
| 2018 | Women | England | England |
| 2019 | Men | Netherlands | Netherlands |
| 2019 | Women | England | Netherlands |
| 2022 | Men | Netherlands | Scotland |
| 2022 | Women | Republic of Ireland | Scotland |
| 2023 | Men | Netherlands | Northern Ireland |
| 2023 | Women | England | Northern Ireland |
| 2024 | Men | Wales | Republic of Ireland |
| 2024 | Women | Wales | Republic of Ireland |
| 2025 | Men | England | Wales |
| 2025 | Women | England | Wales |
| 2026 | Men | | |
| 2026 | Women | | |

== Finals ==
| Year | | Winners | Result | Runners-up |
|---|---|---|---|---|
| 2002 | Men | Scotland | 13-7 | Netherlands |
| 2003 | Men | Scotland | 13- | |
| 2004 | Men | England | 13-9 | Scotland |
| 2005 | Men | England | 13-4 | Northern Ireland |
| 2006 | Men | England | 13-12 | Scotland |
| 2007 | Men | England | 13-7 | Netherlands |
| 2008 | Men | Wales | 13-8 | England |
| 2009 | Men | England | 13-8 | Netherlands |
| 2010 | Men | England | 13-7 | Wales |
| 2010 | Women | England | 5-3 | Netherlands |
| 2011 | Men | England | 13-8 | Wales |
| 2011 | Women | Wales | 5-3 | England |
| 2012 | Men | England | 13-7 | Wales |
| 2012 | Women | England | 5-2 | Wales |
| 2013 | Men | Netherlands | 13-9 | England |
| 2013 | Women | Wales | 5-3 | Netherlands |
| 2014 | Men | England | 13-8 | Netherlands |
| 2014 | Women | England | 5-2 | Wales |
| 2015 | Men | England | 13-12 | Netherlands |
| 2015 | Women | Wales | 5-3 | England |
| 2016 | Men | England | 13-8 | Wales |
| 2016 | Women | England | 5-0 | Wales |
| 2017 | Men | England | 13-4 | Netherlands |
| 2017 | Women | England | 5-4 | Netherlands |
| 2018 | Men | Netherlands | 13-11 | Northern Ireland |
| 2018 | Women | England | 5-4 | Wales |
| 2019 | Men | Netherlands | 13-5 | Wales |
| 2019 | Women | England | 5-0 | Northern Ireland |
| 2022 | Men | Netherlands | 13-11 | England |
| 2022 | Women | Republic of Ireland | 5-4 | England |
| 2023 | Men | Netherlands | 13-10 | Northern Ireland |
| 2023 | Women | England | 5-1 | Scotland |
| 2024 | Men | Wales | 13–9 | England |
| 2024 | Women | Wales | 5-4 | England |
| 2025 | Men | England | 13-7 | Wales |
| 2025 | Women | England | 5-1 | Scotland |
| 2026 | Men | | | |
| 2026 | Women | | | |

== Placings ==
| Year | | Winners | Runners-up | Third place | Fourth place | Fifth place | Sixth place |
|---|---|---|---|---|---|---|---|
| 2002 | Men | Scotland | Netherlands | | | | |
| 2003 | Men | Scotland | | | | | |
| 2004 | Men | England | Northern Ireland | | | | |
| 2005 | Men | England | Scotland | | | | |
| 2006 | Men | England | Scotland | Republic of Ireland | Wales | Netherlands | Northern Ireland |
| 2007 | Men | England | Netherlands | Scotland | Republic of Ireland | Wales | Northern Ireland |
| 2008 | Men | Wales | England | Scotland | Netherlands | Republic of Ireland | Northern Ireland |
| 2009 | Men | England | Netherlands | Wales | Northern Ireland | Scotland | Republic of Ireland |
| 2010 | Men | England | Wales | Scotland | Northern Ireland | Netherlands | Republic of Ireland |
| 2010 | Women | England | Netherlands | Republic of Ireland | Scotland | Wales | Northern Ireland |
| 2011 | Men | England | Wales | Scotland | Netherlands | Northern Ireland | Republic of Ireland |
| 2011 | Women | Wales | England | Netherlands | Republic of Ireland | Scotland | Northern Ireland |
| 2012 | Men | England | Wales | Republic of Ireland / Netherlands | | Scotland | Northern Ireland |
| 2012 | Women | England | Wales | Republic of Ireland / Netherlands | | Scotland | Northern Ireland |
| 2013 | Men | Netherlands | England | Wales | Northern Ireland | Republic of Ireland | Scotland |
| 2013 | Women | Wales | Netherlands | England | Scotland | Republic of Ireland | Northern Ireland |
| 2014 | Men | England | Netherlands | Scotland | Northern Ireland | Republic of Ireland | Wales |
| 2014 | Women | England | Wales | Netherlands / Republic of Ireland | | Scotland | Northern Ireland |
| 2015 | Men | England | Netherlands | Wales | Northern Ireland | Scotland | Republic of Ireland |
| 2015 | Women | Wales | England | Netherlands / Republic of Ireland | | Northern Ireland | Scotland |
| 2016 | Men | England | Wales | / | | / | |
| 2016 | Women | England | Wales | / | | / | |
| 2017 | Men | England | Netherlands | / | | / | |
| 2017 | Women | England | Netherlands | / | | / | |
| 2018 | Men | Netherlands | Northern Ireland | / | | / | |
| 2018 | Women | England | Wales | / | | / | |
| 2019 | Men | Netherlands | Wales | / | | / | |
| 2019 | Women | England | Northern Ireland | / | | / | |
| 2022 | Men | Netherlands | England | / | | / | |
| 2022 | Women | Republic of Ireland | England | / | | / | |
| 2023 | Men | Netherlands | Northern Ireland | / | | / | |
| 2023 | Women | England | Scotland | / | | / | |
| 2024 | Men | Wales | England | / | | / | |
| 2024 | Women | Wales | England | / | | / | |
| 2025 | Men | England | Wales | Republic of Ireland / Scotland | | Northern Ireland / Netherlands | |
| 2025 | Women | England | Scotland | Wales / Republic of Ireland | | Northern Ireland / Netherlands | |
| 2026 | Men | | | | | | |
| 2026 | Women | | | | | | |

|}
