= Zehra Gemi =

Turkish darts player (born 2009)

Personal information
- Nickname: "White Wolf"
- Born: 14 July 2009 (age 17) Denizli, Turkey

Sport
- Sport: Darts
- Playing since: 2020
- Darts: 21g Target

Organisation (see split in darts)
- WDF: 2022–present
- Current world ranking: (WDF W) 66 (17 August 2026)

Other tournament wins
- Years
WDF World Youth Champion	2025
Medal record
Women's Darts
Representing Turkiye
WDF Europe Cup Youth
Gold medal – first place	2023 Vienna	Girls pairs
Gold medal – first place	2023 Vienna	Girls overall
Gold medal – first place	2026 Limerick	Girls team
Gold medal – first place	2026 Limerick	Girls overall
Silver medal – second place	2022 Budapest	Girls pairs
Silver medal – second place	2022 Budapest	Girls overall
Silver medal – second place	2023 Vienna	Girls singles
Silver medal – second place	2024 Riga	Girls pairs
Silver medal – second place	2024 Riga	Girls overall
Bronze medal – third place	2022 Budapest	Girls singles
Bronze medal – third place	2026 Limerick	Girls singles
Bronze medal – third place	2026 Limerick	Girls pairs

Zehra Gemi (born 14 July 2009) is a Turkish darts player who competes in World Darts Federation (WDF) events. She is the first Turkish player to win a world title in the girls' event at the WDF Lakeside World Darts Championship.

== Sport career ==
Gemi began playing darts at the age of eleven after attending a course her school teacher of physical education opened. Known ad "White Wolf", She throws 21g darts, and trains up to four or five hours a day, sometimes completing double sessions.

Representing her country for the first time, she competed in 2022 at the Electronic Darts EDU European Darts Championship in Benidorm, Spain, and grabbed five medals with soft-tip darts she had borrowed from colleagues as her lugguage was lost at the airport.

2022 WDF Europe Cup Youth, in Budapest, Hungary, she lost the semifinals in the girls' singles to Italian Aurora Fochesato, and in the girls' pairs to the Hungarian team.

In 2023, she became champion in the girls' pairs and girls' overall events with Belinay Pehlivan at the WDF Europe Cup Youth in Vienna, Austria.

She became the first Turkish world champion in the girls' event defeating Irish Rebecca Allen in the final at the 2025 WDF World Darts Championship in Frimley Green, Surrey Heath, England.

In February 2026, she won the silver medal in the girls' singles event and the gold medal in the girls' pairs event with Ayşegül Karagöz at the Dutch Open in Assen, Netherlands In March 2026, she won the gold medal in the women's event at the WDF Youth Challenge of the WDF's bronze category, and anothe gold in the platinum category in Vienna, Austria. In May 2026, she captured the gold medal at the Denmark Open in Esbjerg beating her countrygirl Ayşegül Karagöz in the final.

== Personal life ==
Gemi was born in Denizli, western Turkey, on 14 July 2009.
