= Czech Open (darts) =

Darts tournament in the Czech Republic

Tournament information
- Venue: Orea Pyramida Hotel
- Location: Prague
- Country: Czech Republic
- Established: 1995
- Organisation(s): WDF
- Format: Legs
- Prize fund: CZK 208,000
- Month(s) Played: November

Current champion(s)
- Jimmy van Schie (men's); Kirsi Viinikainen (women's)

The Czech Open is a darts tournament held now at Orea Pyramida Hotel in Prague, Czech Republic, and in the past also in many other arenas in the Czech Republic. First edition of this tournament took place in 1995. In 2018–2019, it was one of the most important British Darts Organisation (BDO) and World Darts Federation (WDF) tournaments.

The first winners of this tournament was Jaroslav Procházka from Czechia and Liza Manongson from Austria.

== List of tournaments ==
=== Men's ===
| Year | Champion | Av. | Score | Runner-Up | Av. | Prize Money | | | Venue |
| Year | Champion | Av. | Score | Runner-Up | Av. | Total | Ch. | R.-Up | Venue |
|---|---|---|---|---|---|---|---|---|---|
| 1995 | (Czech Republic) Jaroslav Procházka | n/a | beat | (Czech Republic) Jaroslav Mottl | n/a | n/a | n/a | n/a | Orea Pyramida Hotel, Prague |
| 1996 | (Canada) Blaine Karst | n/a | beat | (Philippines) Reynaldo Ilagan | n/a | n/a | n/a | n/a | Orea Pyramida Hotel, Prague |
| 1997 | (Czech Republic) Oldřich Šulc | n/a | beat | (Czech Republic) Jakub Rejent | n/a | n/a | n/a | n/a | Vitava Hotel, Prague |
| 1998 | (Austria) Mensur Suljović | n/a | beat | (Czech Republic) Oldřich Šulc | n/a | n/a | n/a | n/a | K-Centre Hall, Prague |
| 1999 | (Austria) Mensur Suljović (2) | n/a | beat | (Czech Republic) Oldřich Šulc | n/a | n/a | n/a | n/a | Brumlovka Hall, Prague |
| 2000 | (Czech Republic) Radek Schulz | n/a | beat | (Czech Republic) Jan Mareš | n/a | n/a | n/a | n/a | KS Radost Hall, Prague |
| 2001 | (Czech Republic) Pavel Jirkal | n/a | beat | (Czech Republic) Radek Schulz | n/a | n/a | n/a | n/a | SD Crystal Hall, Česká Lípa |
| 2002 | (Slovakia) Jozef Strečanský | n/a | beat | (Slovakia) Peter Martin | n/a | n/a | n/a | n/a | Bulldog's Darts Pub, Prague |
| 2003 | (Czech Republic) David Miklas | n/a | beat | (Czech Republic) Marcel Tomášek | n/a | n/a | n/a | n/a | Bulldog's Darts Pub, Prague |
| 2004 | (Czech Republic) David Miklas (2) | n/a | 5 – 0 | (Czech Republic) Milan Cíza | n/a | n/a | n/a | n/a | Bulldog's Darts Pub, Prague |
| 2005 | (Austria) Dietmar Burger | 89.91 | 6 – 2 | (Czech Republic) Miloslav Navrátil | 75.63 | CZK 17,000 | CZK 10,000 | CZK 3,000 | Letñanka Cultural Centre, Prague |
| 2006 | (Austria) Dietmar Burger (2) | 82.71 | 6 – 3 | (Czech Republic) David Miklas | 76.29 | CZK 38,000 | CZK 20,000 | CZK 5,000 | TJ Sokol Radotín Hall, Prague |
| 2007 | (Netherlands) Patrick Loos | 81.63 | 6 – 4 | (Netherlands) Mario Robbe | 82.38 | CZK 52,000 | CZK 30,000 | CZK 8,000 | TJ Bohemians Hall, Prague |
| 2008 | (England) Dave Prins | 96.30 | 6 – 4 | (Netherlands) Gino Vos | 92.07 | CZK 76,000 | CZK 40,000 | CZK 10,000 | TJ Bohemians Hall, Prague |
| 2009 | Krzysztof Ratajski | 76.80 | 6 – 1 | (England) Clive Barden | 75.27 | CZK 76,000 | CZK 40,000 | CZK 10,000 | Orea Pyramida Hotel, Prague |
| 2010 | Scott Waites | 93.78 | 6 – 2 | Dean Winstanley | 83.58 | CZK 70,400 | CZK 40,000 | CZK 10,000 | Orea Pyramida Hotel, Prague |
| 2011 | Dean Winstanley | 85.47 | 6 – 5 | Alan Norris | 88.62 | CZK 70,400 | CZK 40,000 | CZK 10,000 | Orea Pyramida Hotel, Prague |
| 2012 | Scott Waites (2) | 103.02 | 6 – 1 | (England) Martin Atkins | 90.33 | CZK 114,000 | CZK 50,000 | CZK 20,000 | Orea Pyramida Hotel, Prague |
| 2013 | Scott Waites (3) | 92.37 | 6 – 1 | (England) Gary Robson | 90.99 | CZK 114,000 | CZK 50,000 | CZK 20,000 | Orea Pyramida Hotel, Prague |
| 2014 | (Netherlands) Jan Dekker | 98.34 | 6 – 3 | (England) Tony O'Shea | 93.98 | CZK 114,000 | CZK 50,000 | CZK 20,000 | Orea Pyramida Hotel, Prague |
| 2015 | (Netherlands) Jeffrey Sparidaans | 92.92 | 6 – 4 | (England) Simon Stainton | 94.33 | CZK 176,000 | CZK 60,000 | CZK 30,000 | Orea Pyramida Hotel, Prague |
| 2016 | Andy Baetens | 84.75 | 6 – 4 | Darryl Fitton | 83.67 | CZK 176,000 | CZK 60,000 | CZK 30,000 | Orea Pyramida Hotel, Prague |
| 2017 | Scott Mitchell | 93.00 | 6 – 3 | (Wales) Martin Phillips | 78.65 | CZK 176,000 | CZK 60,000 | CZK 30,000 | Orea Pyramida Hotel, Prague |
| 2018 | Karel Sedláček | 86.15 | 6 – 2 | Hannes Schnier | 78.70 | CZK 206,000 | CZK 70,000 | CZK 30,000 | Orea Pyramida Hotel, Prague |
| 2019 | Ross Montgomery | 93.13 | 6 – 5 | Keane Barry | 95.40 | CZK 206,000 | CZK 70,000 | CZK 30,000 | Orea Pyramida Hotel, Prague |
| 2021 | Andy Baetens (2) | 89.46 | 5 – 0 | Mark Barilli | 79.44 | CZK 168,000 | CZK 48,000 | CZK 24,000 | Orea Pyramida Hotel, Prague |
| 2022 | Andy Baetens (3) | 91.65 | 5 – 0 | Antony Allen | 83.50 | CZK 145,600 | CZK 41,600 | CZK 20,800 | Orea Pyramida Hotel, Prague |
| 2023 | Andy Baetens (4) | 86.39 | 5 – 1 | Andreas Harrysson | 82.41 | CZK 145,600 | CZK 41,600 | CZK 20,800 | Orea Pyramida Hotel, Prague |
| 2024 | Jimmy van Schie | 94.87 | 5 – 2 | Andreas Harrysson | 79.79 | CZK 145,600 | CZK 41,600 | CZK 20,800 | Orea Pyramida Hotel, Prague |
| 2025 | Jenson Walker | 91.53 | 5 – 1 | James Beeton | 87.71 | CZK 145,600 | CZK 41,600 | CZK 20,800 | Orea Pyramida Hotel, Prague |

=== Women's ===
| Year | Champion | Av. | Score | Runner-Up | Av. | Prize Money | | | Venue |
| Year | Champion | Av. | Score | Runner-Up | Av. | Total | Ch. | R.-Up | Venue |
|---|---|---|---|---|---|---|---|---|---|
| 1996 | (Austria) Liza Manongson | n/a | beat | (Czech Republic) Dana Veselá | n/a | n/a | n/a | n/a | Orea Pyramida Hotel, Prague |
| 1997 | (Czech Republic) Františka Tomancová | n/a | beat | (Czech Republic) Michaela Hejduková | n/a | n/a | n/a | n/a | Vitava Hotel, Prague |
| 1998 | (Czech Republic) Lucie Chasáková | n/a | beat | (Czech Republic) Irena Štruplová | n/a | n/a | n/a | n/a | K-Centre Hall, Prague |
| 1999 | (Russia) Tanya Tchernin | n/a | beat | (Czech Republic) Martina Radová | n/a | n/a | n/a | n/a | Brumlovka Hall, Prague |
| 2000 | (Czech Republic) Eva Šnajdrová | n/a | beat | (Czech Republic) Milena Jirkalová | n/a | n/a | n/a | n/a | KS Radost Hall, Prague |
| 2001 | (Czech Republic) Miroslava Tvrdíková | n/a | beat | (Czech Republic) Lucie Tomancová | n/a | n/a | n/a | n/a | SD Crystal Hall, Česká Lípa |
| 2002 | (Czech Republic) Milena Jirkalová | n/a | beat | (Latvia) Inita Vansoviča | n/a | n/a | n/a | n/a | Bull Dog's Darts Pub, Prague |
| 2003 | (Czech Republic) Květa Drahuška | n/a | beat | (Czech Republic) Renáta Kimáková | n/a | n/a | n/a | n/a | Bull Dog's Darts Pub, Prague |
| 2004 | (Czech Republic) Milena Jirkalová (2) | n/a | 4 – 2 | (Czech Republic) Lenka Drtilová | n/a | n/a | n/a | n/a | Bull Dog's Darts Pub, Prague |
| 2005 | (Austria) Monika Schartner | 46.29 | 5 – 2 | (Hungary) Zsófia Lázár | 47.40 | CZK 5,000 | CZK 3,000 | CZK 1,000 | Letñanka Cultural Centre, Prague |
| 2006 | (Czech Republic) Blanka Vojtková | 60.45 | 5 – 4 | (Hungary) Zsófia Lázár | 59.10 | CZK 11,000 | CZK 5,000 | CZK 2,000 | TJ Sokol Radotín Hall, Prague |
| 2007 | (Netherlands) Karin Krappen | n/a | 5 – 0 | (Austria) Barbara Kuntner | n/a | CZK 17,000 | CZK 10,000 | CZK 3,000 | TJ Bohemians Hall, Prague |
| 2008 | (Netherlands) Karin Krappen (2) | 61.59 | 5 – 2 | (Germany) Irina Armstrong | 64.53 | CZK 26,200 | CZK 15,000 | CZK 5,000 | TJ Bohemians Hall, Prague |
| 2009 | (Germany) Irina Armstrong | 70.59 | 5 – 2 | (England) Deta Hedman | 70.14 | CZK 33,000 | CZK 20,000 | CZK 5,000 | Orea Pyramida Hotel, Prague |
| 2010 | (Netherlands) Karin Krappen (3) | 71.55 | 5 – 2 | (England) Lorraine Winstanley | 73.41 | CZK 42,000 | CZK 20,000 | CZK 8,000 | Orea Pyramida Hotel, Prague |
| 2011 | Deta Hedman | 75.66 | 5 – 1 | (Germany) Irina Armstrong | 67.95 | CZK 42,000 | CZK 20,000 | CZK 8,000 | Orea Pyramida Hotel, Prague |
| 2012 | (England) Rachel Brooks | n/a | 5 – 3 | Deta Hedman | n/a | CZK 42,000 | CZK 20,000 | CZK 8,000 | Orea Pyramida Hotel, Prague |
| 2013 | Deta Hedman (2) | 70.05 | 5 – 3 | (Netherlands) Aileen de Graaf | 75.93 | CZK 42,000 | CZK 20,000 | CZK 8,000 | Orea Pyramida Hotel, Prague |
| 2014 | (Netherlands) Aileen de Graaf | 74.03 | 5 – 1 | (Czech Republic) Dagmar Komorová | 60.53 | CZK 42,000 | CZK 20,000 | CZK 8,000 | Orea Pyramida Hotel, Prague |
| 2015 | (Netherlands) Aileen de Graaf (2) | 83.50 | 5 – 0 | Deta Hedman | 70.69 | CZK 71,000 | CZK 30,000 | CZK 15,000 | Orea Pyramida Hotel, Prague |
| 2016 | (Russia) Anastasia Dobromyslova | 80.30 | 5 – 3 | (Netherlands) Aileen de Graaf | 71.84 | CZK 71,000 | CZK 30,000 | CZK 15,000 | Orea Pyramida Hotel, Prague |
| 2017 | (Australia) Corrine Hammond | 71.58 | 5 – 0 | (England) Trina Gulliver | 64.23 | CZK 71,000 | CZK 30,000 | CZK 15,000 | Orea Pyramida Hotel, Prague |
| 2018 | (England) Lorraine Winstanley | 80.23 | 5 – 3 | (England) Lisa Ashton | 77.26 | CZK 94,200 | CZK 30,000 | CZK 15,000 | Orea Pyramida Hotel, Prague |
| 2019 | (England) Lisa Ashton | 77.42 | 5 – 1 | (England) Lorraine Winstanley | 73.76 | CZK 94,200 | CZK 30,000 | CZK 15,000 | Orea Pyramida Hotel, Prague |
| 2021 | Deta Hedman (3) | 84.22 | 5 – 4 | (England) Laura Turner | 84.72 | CZK 84,000 | CZK 24,000 | CZK 12,000 | Orea Pyramida Hotel, Prague |
| 2022 | Beau Greaves | 87.38 | 5 – 0 | Deta Hedman | 77.39 | CZK 62,400 | CZK 20,800 | CZK 10,400 | Orea Pyramida Hotel, Prague |
| 2023 | Aletta Wajer | 70.24 | 5 – 4 | Monique Lessmeister | 69.93 | CZK 62,400 | CZK 20,800 | CZK 10,400 | Orea Pyramida Hotel, Prague |
| 2024 | Kirsi Viinikainen | 75.61 | 5 – 2 | Jitka Císařová | 70.46 | CZK 62,400 | CZK 20,800 | CZK 10,400 | Orea Pyramida Hotel, Prague |
| 2025 | Kirsi Viinikainen (2) | 65.47 | 5 – 3 | Priscilla Steenbergen | 63.20 | CZK 62,400 | CZK 20,800 | CZK 10,400 | Orea Pyramida Hotel, Prague |

=== Boys ===
| Year | Champion | Av. | Score | Runner-up | Av. | Venue |
|---|---|---|---|---|---|---|
| 2012 | (Czech Republic) Filip Šebesta | n/a | beat | (Netherlands) Lars Fransen | n/a | Orea Pyramida Hotel, Prague |
| 2013 | (England) Nathan Street | n/a | beat | (Austria) Fredi Gsellmann | n/a | Orea Pyramida Hotel, Prague |
| 2014 | (Netherlands) Wessel Nijman | n/a | beat | (Netherlands) Lars Fransen | n/a | Orea Pyramida Hotel, Prague |
| 2015 | (Austria) Rusty-Jake Rodriguez | n/a | beat | (Netherlands) Wessel Nijman | n/a | Orea Pyramida Hotel, Prague |
| 2016 | (Czech Republic) Roman Benecký | n/a | beat | (England) Owen Maiden | n/a | Orea Pyramida Hotel, Prague |
| 2017 | (Hungary) Gergely Lakatos | n/a | beat | (Denmark) Magnus Larsen | n/a | Orea Pyramida Hotel, Prague |
| 2018 | Danny Jansen | n/a | beat | Tomáš Houdek | n/a | Orea Pyramida Hotel, Prague |
| 2019 | Tomáš Houdek | 86.47 | 4 – 3 | Danny Jansen | 77.07 | Orea Pyramida Hotel, Prague |
| 2021 | Tomáš Houdek (2) | 84.31 | 4 – 1 | (Czech Republic) Jan Jireš | 67.14 | Orea Pyramida Hotel, Prague |
| 2022 | Mats Theobald | 76.29 | 4 – 3 | Zoltán Polonyi | 71.12 | Orea Pyramida Hotel, Prague |
| 2023 | András Borbély | 77.39 | 4 – 3 | Kimi Seemann | 75.84 | Orea Pyramida Hotel, Prague |
| 2024 | (Germany) Florian Preis | | 4 – 2 | (Czech Republic) Petr Grecman Jr | | Orea Pyramida Hotel, Prague |
| 2025 | (Germany) Florian Preis (2) | 85.89 | 4 – 0 | Ben Untersteiner | | Orea Pyramida Hotel, Prague |

=== Girls ===
| Year | Champion | Av. | Score | Runner-up | Av. | Venue |
|---|---|---|---|---|---|---|
| 2023 | Sophie McKinlay | n/a | 4 – 2 | Krisztina Turai | n/a | Orea Pyramida Hotel, Prague |
| 2024 | (Austria) Nadine Spet | | 3 – 2 | (Germany) Jacqueline Rantsch | | Orea Pyramida Hotel, Prague |
| 2025 | (Hungary) Hanna Rábaközi | | 4 – 2 | Alexandra Vavrovicova | | Orea Pyramida Hotel, Prague |

== Records and statistics ==
=== Nine-dart finishes ===
| Player | Year (+ Round) | Method (single-in double-out) | Opponent | Result |
|---|---|---|---|---|
| (Germany) Michael Unterbuchner | 2017, Fourth round | 3 x T20; 3 x T20; T20, T19, D12 | (Netherlands) Dennie Olde Kalter | — |
