= WDF Europe Youth Cup =

Tournament information
- Established: 1990
- Organisation(s): WDF

Current champion(s)
- Singles; Mitchell Lawrie (boys' singles); Paige Pauling (girls' singles); Pairs (England) Mason Teese & Jack Nankervis (boys' pairs) (Wales) Yazmin Ruck-Havard & Abbie Brewster (girls' pairs); Team; Scotland (boys' team) (Turkey) Turkiye (girls' team); Overall; England (boys' overall); England (girls' overall)

The WDF Europe Youth Cup is a youth darts tournament held annually since 1990.

== Tournament structure ==
The tournament consists of a team championship, a pairs championship and a singles championship. All events have a boys' competition, and a girls' competition. The most recent Europe Youth Cup was held in 2025, in Assen, Netherlands.

== Previous winners ==
Year	Venue	Boys' Singles champion	Boys' Pairs champion	Boys' Team champion	Boys' Overall champion	Girls' singles champion	Girls' Pairs champion	Girls' Overall champion	Girls' Teams Champion	Ref
1990	(Denmark) Billund	(Netherlands) Peter van Tilborg	(Netherlands) Vincent van der Voort (Netherlands) Peter van Tilborg	(Denmark) Brian Christensen (Denmark) Jesper Hansen (Denmark) Thomas Hansen (Denmark) Birger Nielsen	(Netherlands) Vincent van der Voort (Netherlands) Michel Rijkens (Netherlands) Roberto Scheermeyer (Netherlands) Peter van Tilborg	(Denmark) Ann-Louise Andersen	(Germany) Heike Jacob (Germany) Anja Vonscheidt	(Denmark) Ann-Louise Andersen (Denmark) Karina Knudsen		
1991	(Denmark) Billund	(Netherlands) Vincent van der Voort	(Germany) Dieter Hartenfels (Germany) Christian Lechtken	(Denmark) Jesper Hansen (Denmark) Thomas Hansen (Denmark) Jimmy Pedersen (Denmark) Christian Sorensen	(Germany) Jyhan Artut (Germany) Dieter Hartenfels (Germany) Christian Lechtken (Germany)	(Denmark) Ann-Louise Andersen	(Denmark) Ann-Louise Andersen (Denmark) Karina Knudsen	(Denmark) Ann-Louise Andersen (Denmark) Karina Knudsen		
1992	(Denmark) Billund	(Sweden) Örjan Thomsson	(Denmark) Tonny Brondum (Denmark) Michael Lund	(Norway) John Sandaker (Norway) Jan-Inge Arnesen (Norway) Johnny Larsen (Norway) Kenneth Thomassen	(Sweden) Jonas Bergström (Sweden) Orjan Thomsson (Sweden) Frederik Persson (Sweden) Kristian Thalin	(Denmark) Ann-Louise Andersen	(Denmark) Ann-Louise Andersen (Denmark) Heidi Nielsen	(Denmark) Ann-Louise Andersen (Denmark) Heidi Nielsen		
1993	(Denmark) Billund	(Finland) Sami Salama	(Finland) Mikko Larinen (Finland) Jani Lavikainen	(Finland) Jarkko Komula (Finland) Mikko Larinen (Finland) Jani Lavikainen (Finland) Sami Salama	(Finland) Jarkko Komula (Finland) Mikko Larinen (Finland) Jani Lavikainen (Finland) Sami Salama	(Finland) Jane Wiren	(Finland) Sari Liimatta (Finland) Jane Wiren	(Finland) Sari Liimatta (Finland) Jane Wiren		
1994	(Denmark) Billund	(Germany) Christian Lechten	(Sweden) Christian Andersson (Sweden) Per Knutson	(Finland) Jarkko Komula (Finland) Janne Aman (Finland) Mikko Larinen (Finland) Tommy Tyvelä	(Finland) Jarkko Komula (Finland) Janne Aman (Finland) Mikko Larinen (Finland) Tommy Tyvelä	(Netherlands) Mieke de Boer	(Finland) Sari Liimatta (Finland) Jane Wiren	(Finland) Sari Liimatta (Finland) Jane Wiren		
1995	(Netherlands) Papendal	(England) Steve Douglas	(Netherlands) Arjan Moen (Netherlands) Robin Brandsen	(Finland) Jaakko Huhta (Finland) Ilkka Kovanen (Finland) Kimmo Peratalo (Finland) Riku Pyrrö	(Netherlands) Arjan Moen (Netherlands) Paul Bartels (Netherlands) Robin Brandsen (Netherlands) Niels Kippersluis	(England) Caroline Lee	(England) Laura Barnard (England) Caroline Lee	(England) Laura Barnard (England) Caroline Lee		
1996	(Germany) Bremen	(England) Nick Buckingham	(England) Nick Buckingham (England) Alan Sutch	(England) Aaron Turner (England) Martin Whatmough (England) Nick Buckingham (England) Alan Sutch	(England) Aaron Turner (England) Martin Whatmough (England) Nick Buckingham (England) Alan Sutch	(England) Caroline Lee	(England) Laura Barnard (England) Caroline Lee	(England) Laura Barnard (England) Caroline Lee		
1997	(Finland) Tampere	(England) Leon Womack	(England) Steve Smith (England) Leon Womack	(England) Steve Smith (England) Aaron Turner (England) Leon Womack (England) Matt Chapman	(England) Steve Smith (England) Aaron Turner (England) Leon Womack (England) Matt Chapman	(England) Caroline Lee	(England) Laura Barnard (England) Caroline Lee	(England) Laura Barnard (England) Caroline Lee		
1998	(Bulgaria) Sofia	(Russia) Igor Manturov	(Denmark) Niels Klausen (Denmark) Peter Sondergard	(Netherlands) Kevin Vennik (Netherlands) (Netherlands) (Netherlands)	(Denmark) Brian Svendsen (Denmark) Nicki Hakonson (Denmark) Niels Klausen (Denmark) Peter Sondergard	(Netherlands) Donna Brongers	(Wales) Janine Gough (Wales) Rhiannon Thomas	(Wales) Janine Gough (Wales) Rhiannon Thomas		
1999	(Denmark) Vejle	(Netherlands) Jeroen van Leeuwen	(England) Matt Chapman (England) Mark Jones	(Denmark) Peter Sonderby (Denmark) Nicki Hakonson (Denmark) Steffen Hansen (Denmark) Niels Klausen	(Denmark) Peter Sonderby (Denmark) Nicki Hakonson (Denmark) Steffen Hansen (Denmark) Niels Klausen	(Netherlands) Diane Secreve	(Russia) Anastasia Dobromyslova (Russia) Anastasia Borissova	(Russia) Anastasia Dobromyslova (Russia) Anastasia Borissova		
2000	Gibraltar	(Netherlands) Jeroen van Leeuwen	(England) James Wade (England) Jason Crawley	(England) James Wade (England) Stephen Bunting (England) Jason Crawley (England) Adam King	(England) James Wade (England) Stephen Bunting (England) Jason Crawley (England) Adam King	(Wales) Rhiannon Thomas	(Wales) Janine Gough (Wales) Rhiannon Thomas	(Wales) Janine Gough (Wales) Rhiannon Thomas		
2001	(Germany) Bremen	(Netherlands) Joey ten Berge	(England) Jason Crawley (England) Adam King	(Russia) Nikita Medvedev (Russia) (Russia) (Russia)	(England) James Wade (England) Stephen Bunting (England) Jason Crawley (England) Adam King	(Russia) Anastasia Dobromyslova	(England) Laura Turner (England) Clare Stewart	(England) Laura Turner (England) Clare Stewart		
2002	(Belgium) Mechelen	(England) Stephen Bunting	(Russia) Nikita Medvedev (Russia) Alexander Alexandrov	(Scotland) Chris Loudon (Scotland) Chris Mackie (Scotland) Chris Coyle (Scotland) David Morrison	(Scotland) Chris Loudon (Scotland) Chris Mackie (Scotland) Chris Coyle (Scotland) David Morrison	(Russia) Anastasia Dobromyslova	(Hungary) Nora Fekete (Hungary) Orsolya Bodi	(Hungary) Nora Fekete (Hungary) Orsolya Bodi		
2003	(England) Folkestone	(Netherlands) Dennis Labee	(Netherlands) Sven van Dun (Netherlands) Dennis Labee	(Netherlands) Jerry Hendriks (Netherlands) Sven van Dun (Netherlands) Dennis Labee (Netherlands) Jeroen Verhoeven	(Netherlands) Jerry Hendriks (Netherlands) Sven van Dun (Netherlands) Dennis Labee (Netherlands) Jeroen Verhoeven	(Germany) Nicole Osthues	(Wales) Natalie Tucker (Wales) Jody-Lee Hopkins	(Wales) Natalie Tucker (Wales) Jody-Lee Hopkins		
2004	(Germany) Bremen	(Netherlands) Johnny Nijs	(Germany) Kevin Münch (Germany) Christopher Klimek	(Denmark) Vladimir Andersen (Denmark) Kenneth Simmonsen (Denmark) Dennis Frederiksen (Denmark) Nikolai Frets	(Germany) Kevin Münch (Germany) Christopher Klimek (Germany) Patrick Kloh (Germany) Steven Krause	(England) Kate Dando	(Germany) Nicole Osthues (Germany) Kerstin Lederbogen	(Germany) Nicole Osthues (Germany) Kerstin Lederbogen		
2005	(Netherlands) Noordwijkerhout	(Netherlands) Johnny Nijs	(Netherlands) Michael van Gerwen (Netherlands) Johnny Nijs	(Netherlands) Michael van Gerwen (Netherlands) Johnny Nijs (Netherlands) Ronnie Bredewoud (Netherlands) Pieter Collijn	(Netherlands) Michael van Gerwen (Netherlands) Johnny Nijs (Netherlands) Ronnie Bredewoud (Netherlands) Pieter Collijn	(Netherlands) Carla Molema	(Netherlands) Carla Molema (Netherlands) Chantal Snijders	(Netherlands) Carla Molema (Netherlands) Chantal Snijders		
2006	(Germany) Kalkar	(Netherlands) Michael van Gerwen	(Netherlands) Michael van Gerwen (Netherlands) Sven van Dun	(Netherlands) Michael van Gerwen (Netherlands) Jan Dekker (Netherlands) Pieter Collijn (Netherlands) Sven van Dun	(Netherlands) Michael van Gerwen (Netherlands) Jan Dekker (Netherlands) Pieter Collijn (Netherlands) Sven van Dun	(Wales) Kimberley Lewis	(Germany) Benita Göbel (Germany) Kerstin Lederbogen	(Wales) Kimberley Lewis (Wales) Kylie Murphy		
2007	(England) Folkestone	(Netherlands) Maarten Pape	(Netherlands) Jan Dekker (Netherlands) Pieter Collijn	(Netherlands) Jan Dekker (Netherlands) Maarten Pape (Netherlands) Pieter Collijn (Netherlands) Wesley van de Hurk	(Netherlands) Jan Dekker (Netherlands) Maarten Pape (Netherlands) Pieter Collijn (Netherlands) Wesley van de Hurk	(Germany) Jenny Lieverkus	(Germany) Jenny Lieverkus (Germany) Asaria Hintzsche-Oehme	(Germany) Jenny Lieverkus (Germany) Asaria Hintzsche-Oehme		
2008	(Wales) Swansea	(England) Shaun Griffiths	(Netherlands) Maarten Pape (Netherlands) Jeffrey Stigter	(Netherlands) Maarten Pape (Netherlands) Gilbert van der Meijden (Netherlands) Boyd Meyer (Netherlands) Jeffrey Stigter	(Netherlands) Maarten Pape (Netherlands) Gilbert van der Meijden (Netherlands) Boyd Meyer (Netherlands) Jeffrey Stigter	(Sweden) Gabriella Asthammer	(Sweden) Linda Odén (Sweden) Gabriella Asthammer	(Sweden) Linda Odén (Sweden) Gabriella Asthammer		
2009	(Netherlands) Veldhoven	(Sweden) Oskar Lukasiak	(Sweden) Oskar Lukasiak (Sweden) Edwin Torbjörnsson	(Netherlands) Daniel van Mourik (Netherlands) Gilbert van der Meijden (Netherlands) Jeffrey Sparidaans (Netherlands) Jeffrey Stigter	(Sweden) Oskar Lukasiak (Sweden) Edwin Torbjörnsson (Sweden) Charlie Guldvinge (Sweden) Birk Kamp	(England) Zoe Jones	(England) Zoe Jones (England) Lauren Hitchens	(England) Zoe Jones (England) Lauren Hitchens		
2010	(Germany) Kirchheim	(Wales) Nick Kenny	(Netherlands) Jeffrey de Zwaan (Netherlands) Jeffrey Stigter	(England) Josh Payne (England) Matthew Dicken (England) Ben Songhurst (England) Jake Jones	(England) Josh Payne (England) Matthew Dicken (England) Ben Songhurst (England) Jake Jones	(Russia) Anna Yakovleva	(Wales) Kimberley Lewis (Wales) Gemma Bowen	(Russia) Anna Yakovleva (Russia) Anastasia Belayeva		
2011	(Scotland) Aberdeen	(Netherlands) Jimmy Hendriks	(Netherlands) Jeffrey de Zwaan (Netherlands) Mike Zuydwijk	(England) Josh Payne (England) Josh McCarthy (England) Jake Jones (England) Thomas Chant	(Netherlands) Jimmy Hendriks (Netherlands) Jeffrey de Zwaan (Netherlands) Mike Zuydwijk (Netherlands) Jimmy van Schie	(Wales) Alannah Waters	(England) Fallon Sherrock (England) Felicia Blay	(England) Fallon Sherrock (England) Felicia Blay		
2012	(Belgium) Antwerp	(Germany) Max Hopp	(Netherlands) Jeffrey de Zwaan (Netherlands) Quin Wester	(Netherlands) Jeffrey de Zwaan (Netherlands) Sven Groen (Netherlands) Kevin Voornhout (Netherlands) Quin Wester	(Netherlands) Jeffrey de Zwaan (Netherlands) Sven Groen (Netherlands) Kevin Voornhout (Netherlands) Quin Wester	(England) Casey Gallagher	(England) Casey Gallagher (England) Josie Patterson	(England) Casey Gallagher (England) Josie Patterson		
2013	(Hungary) Keszthely	(Netherlands) Quin Wester	(Netherlands) Colin Roelofs (Netherlands) Quin Wester	(Netherlands) Kevin Doets (Netherlands) Berry van Peer (Netherlands) Colin Roelofs (Netherlands) Quin Wester	(Netherlands) Kevin Doets (Netherlands) Berry van Peer (Netherlands) Colin Roelofs (Netherlands) Quin Wester	(England) Casey Gallagher	(England) Casey Gallagher (England) Natasha Eaves	(England) Casey Gallagher (England) Natasha Eaves		
2014	(Austria) Vienna	(Netherlands) Colin Roelofs	(Denmark) Andreas Bergø (Denmark) Nicolai Rasmussen	(Netherlands) Kevin Doets (Netherlands) Berry van Peer (Netherlands) Colin Roelofs (Netherlands) Niels Zonneveld	(Netherlands) Kevin Doets (Netherlands) Berry van Peer (Netherlands) Colin Roelofs (Netherlands) Niels Zonneveld	(Republic of Ireland) Robyn Byrne	(Republic of Ireland) Robyn Byrne (Republic of Ireland) Leeah Fox	(Republic of Ireland) Robyn Byrne (Republic of Ireland) Leeah Fox		
2015	(Denmark) Vingsted	(Germany) Nico Schlund	(Netherlands) Justin van Tergouw (Netherlands) Maikel Verberk	(Republic of Ireland) Dean Finn (Republic of Ireland) Ronan McDonagh (Republic of Ireland) Conor Heneghan (Republic of Ireland) Mark Connolly	(Netherlands) Justin van Tergouw (Netherlands) Maikel Verberk (Netherlands) Jeffrey Ballast (Netherlands) Job ten Heuvel	(Netherlands) Layla Brussel	(Hungary) Kitti Neumajer (Hungary) Vivien Czipo	(Hungary) Kitti Neumajer (Hungary) Vivien Czipo		
2016	(Hungary) Budapest	(Netherlands) Justin van Tergouw	(Netherlands) Justin van Tergouw (Netherlands) Maikel Verberk	(Netherlands) Justin van Tergouw (Netherlands) Maikel Verberk (Netherlands) Levy Frauenfelder (Netherlands) Wesley Hurrebrink	(Netherlands) Justin van Tergouw (Netherlands) Maikel Verberk (Netherlands) Levy Frauenfelder (Netherlands) Wesley Hurrebrink	(England) Beau Greaves	(Hungary) Kitti Neumajer (Hungary) Vivien Czipo	(Hungary) Kitti Neumajer (Hungary) Vivien Czipo		
2017	(Sweden) Malmö	(England) Jarred Cole	(Austria) Rusty-Jake Rodriguez (Austria) Thomas Langer	(Netherlands) Justin van Tergouw (Netherlands) Marvin van Velzen (Netherlands) Levy Frauenfelder (Netherlands) Weesel Nijman	(Netherlands) Justin van Tergouw (Netherlands) Marvin van Velzen (Netherlands) Levy Frauenfelder (Netherlands) Wessel Nijman	(Turkey) Emine Dursan	(Netherlands) Lerena Riestbergen (Netherlands) Layla Brussel	(Netherlands) Lerena Riestbergen (Netherlands) Layla Brussel		
2018	(Turkey) Ankara	(Netherlands) Jurjen van der Velde	(Republic of Ireland) Keane Barry; Killian Heffernan	(Netherlands) Jurjen van der Velde; Levy Frauenfelder; Marcel Bus; Ricardo van der Vloed	(Netherlands) Jurjen van der Velde; Levy Frauenfelder; Marcel Bus; Ricardo van der Vloed	(England) Beau Greaves	(England) Beau Greaves; Shannon Reeves	(England) Beau Greaves; Shannon Reeves		
2019	(Turkey) Ankara	(England) Leighton Bennett	(Netherlands) Jurjen van der Velde; Luke van der Kwast	(Republic of Ireland) Killian Heffernan; Keane Barry; Damien Moore; Dylan Slevin	(Netherlands) Danny Jensen; Jurjen van der Velde; Luke van der Kwast; Marcel Bus	(Hungary) Tamara Kovács	(England) Shannon Reeves; Beau Greaves	(England) Shannon Reeves; Beau Greaves		
2022	(Hungary) Budapest	Luke Littler	England; Thomas Banks; Charlie Manby	England; Thomas Banks; Luke Littler; Charlie Manby; Archie Self	England; Thomas Banks; Luke Littler; Charlie Manby; Archie Self	Aurora Fochesato	Hungary; Tamara Kovács; Krisztina Turai	England; Amy Evans; Paige Pauling		
2023	(Austria) Vienna	(Germany) Yorick Hofkens	England; Thomas Banks; Archie Self	England; Thomas Banks; Callum Beddow; Jenson Walker; Archie Self	England; Thomas Banks; Callum Beddow; Jenson Walker; Archie Self	Aurora Fochesato	Turkey; Zehra Gemi; Belinay Pehlivan	Turkey; Zehra Gemi; Belinay Pehlivan		
2024	(Latvia) Riga	Jenson Walker	England; Jenson Walker; Alfie Busby	IrelandSean McKeon; Callum Coade; Shane Porter; Aidan O'Hara	IrelandSean McKeon; Callum Coade; Shane Porter; Aidan O'Hara	(Scotland) Sophie McKinlay	Scotland; Sophie McKinlay; Jessica Matheson	Scotland; Sophie McKinlay; Jessica Matheson		
2025	(Netherlands) Assen	(Scotland) Mitchell Lawrie	England; Mason Teese; Jack Nankervis	ScotlandMitchell Lawrie; Barry Watson; Kyle Davidson; Adam Craik	England; Sam Jackson; Mason Teese; Jack Nankervis; Oliver Haughan	Paige Pauling	Wales; Yazmin Ruck-Havard; Abbie Brewster	England; Paige Pauling; Ruby Grey	Turkey; Ceylin Atas; Ayşegül Karagöz	
