= Latvia Open =

Darts tournament held in Riga, Latvia

Tournament information
- Venue: Bellevue Park Hotel
- Location: Riga
- Country: Latvia
- Established: 2004
- Organisation(s): WDF
- Format: Legs
- Prize fund: €3,705

Current champion(s)
- Darius Labanauskas (men's); Anca Zijlstra (women's); Jenson Walker (boys) (Iceland) Nadía Ósk Guðmundsdóttir (girls)

The Latvia Open is the biggest World Darts Federation ranked darts tournament in Latvia and the Baltic States. It has been a WDF world ranked competition since 2004.

== List of tournaments ==
=== Men's ===
Year	Champion	Av.	Score	Runner-Up	Av.	Prize Money			Venue
Year	Champion	Av.	Score	Runner-Up	Av.	Total	Ch.	R.-Up	Venue
2004	(Sweden) Annti Partianen	n/a	beat	(Sweden) Ulf Hausenkamp	n/a	LVL 1,800	LVL 600	LVL 300	Skanste Hotel, Riga
2006	(Latvia) Aigars Strēlis	n/a	6 – 3	(Latvia) Juris Aleksāns	n/a	LVL 1,800	LVL 600	LVL 300	Skanste Hotel, Riga
2007	(Sweden) Oskar Lukasiak	n/a	6 – 3	(Belgium) John Snijers	n/a	LVL 1,800	LVL 600	LVL 300	Maritim Park, Riga
2008	(Lithuania) Arūnas Čiplys	79.26	5 – 4	(Scotland) Alex Lister	71.70	LVL 1,800	LVL 600	LVL 300	Maritim Park, Riga
2009	(Netherlands) Leon de Geus	n/a	3 – 1	(Norway) Jarl Skomsøy	n/a	LVL 1,400	LVL 700	LVL 300	Maritim Park, Riga
2010	(Poland) Krzysztof Ratajski	84.51	3 – 0	(Sweden) Peter Sajwani	72.45	LVL 1,800	LVL 900	LVL 400	Maritim Park, Riga
2011	(England) Paul Jennings	n/a	3 – 1	(England) Steve Douglas	n/a	LVL 1,800	LVL 900	LVL 400	Maritim Park, Riga
2012	(Lithuania) Arūnas Čiplys (2)	n/a	6 – 4	(Latvia) Madars Razma	n/a	LVL 1,800	LVL 900	LVL 400	Maritim Park, Riga
2013	(Scotland) Paul Coughlin	n/a	6 – 5	(Latvia) Madars Razma	n/a	LVL 1,800	LVL 900	LVL 400	Maritim Park, Riga
2014	(England) Dennis Harbour	82.26	6 – 3	(Lithuania) Arūnas Čiplys	79.59	€2,800	€1,300	€600	Maritim Park, Riga
2015	(Finland) Ulf Ceder	89.28	6 – 0	(Finland) Petri Rasmus	71.40	€2,400	€800	€400	Bellevue Park, Riga
2016	(Latvia) Madars Razma	88.59	6 – 3	(Sweden) Peter Sajwani	82.80	€2,400	€800	€400	Bellevue Park, Riga
2017	(Lithuania) Darius Labanauskas	77.27	6 – 1	(England) Craig Venman	64.98	€3,600	€1,000	€500	Bellevue Park, Riga
2018	(Lithuania) Darius Labanauskas (2)	n/a	6 – 2	(England) John Scott	n/a	€3,600	€1,000	€500	Bellevue Park, Riga
2019	(Belarus) Andrey Pontus	82.20	6 – 3	(Russia) Aleksei Kadochnikov	74.87	€3,600	€1,000	€500	Bellevue Park, Riga
2022	Peter Chown	87.90	5 – 1	Sebastian Steyer	76.96	€2,400	€800	€400	Bellevue Park, Riga
2023	François Schweyen	91.51	6 – 2	Edwin Torbjörnsson	78.03	€5,600	€1,600	€800	Bellevue Park, Riga
2024	Darius Labanauskas (3)	97.45	6 – 2	Jonas Masalin	86.11	€5,600	€1,600	€800	Bellevue Park, Riga

=== Women's ===
Year	Champion	Av.	Score	Runner-Up	Av.	Prize Money			Venue
Year	Champion	Av.	Score	Runner-Up	Av.	Total	Ch.	R.-Up	Venue
2004	(Norway) Inita Bite	n/a	beat	(Latvia) Zeltite Putnina	n/a	n/a	n/a	n/a	Skanste Hotel, Riga
2006	(Finland) Marika Juhola	n/a	5 – 2	(Estonia) Triin Timmermann	n/a	n/a	n/a	n/a	Skanste Hotel, Riga
2007	(Latvia) Zeltite Putnina	n/a	5 – 2	(Norway) Inita Bite	n/a	n/a	n/a	n/a	Maritim Park, Riga
2008	Maud Jansson	n/a	5 – 1	(Latvia) Zeltite Putnina	n/a	n/a	n/a	n/a	Maritim Park, Riga
2009	(Latvia) Ieva Brikmane	n/a	2 – 1	(Lithuania) Vilma Armaliene	n/a	n/a	n/a	n/a	Maritim Park, Riga
2010	Maud Jansson (2)	65.34	2 – 0	(Poland) Karolina Ratajska	44.61	n/a	n/a	n/a	Maritim Park, Riga
2011	(Russia) Anastasia Dobromyslova	n/a	2 – 1	(Norway) Rachna David	n/a	n/a	n/a	n/a	Maritim Park, Riga
2012	(Finland) Lumi Silvan	n/a	5 – 1	(Finland) Maret Liiri	n/a	n/a	n/a	n/a	Maritim Park, Riga
2013	(Germany) Irina Armstrong	n/a	5 – 3	(Finland) Lumi Silvan	n/a	n/a	n/a	n/a	Maritim Park, Riga
2014	(Netherlands) Danielle Ijpelaar	72.51	5 – 4	(Finland) Lumi Silvan	69.42	€1,200	€500	€250	Maritim Park, Riga
2015	Maud Jansson (3)	69.09	5 – 2	(Finland) Kaisu Rekinen	58.47	€1,200	€500	€250	Bellevue Park, Riga
2016	(Finland) Kaisu Rekinen	68.43	5 – 4	(England) Margaret Sutton	62.76	€1,200	€500	€250	Bellevue Park, Riga
2017	(Sweden) Helene Sundelin	n/a	beat	(Finland) Maret Liiri	n/a	€1,200	€500	€250	Bellevue Park, Riga
2018	Aileen de Graaf	n/a	5 – 1	Deta Hedman	n/a	€1,200	€500	€250	Bellevue Park, Riga
2019	(Finland) Kirsi Viinikainen	50.90	5 – 3	(Sweden) Helene Sundelin	54.19	€1,200	€500	€250	Bellevue Park, Riga
2022	Maud Jansson (4)	60.19	5 – 3	Anna Forsmark	57.95	€1,200	€500	€250	Bellevue Park, Riga
2023	Maud Jansson (5)	63.17	5 – 3	Irina Armstrong	61.78	€2,400	€800	€400	Bellevue Park, Riga
2024	Anca Zijlstra	70.75	5 – 4	Lerena Rietbergen	70.84	€2,400	€800	€400	Bellevue Park, Riga

=== Youth's ===
Year	Champion	Av.	Score	Runner-Up	Av.	Prize Money			Venue
Year	Champion	Av.	Score	Runner-Up	Av.	Total	Ch.	R.-Up	Venue
2013	(Lithuania) Kornelija Lusaite	n/a	beat	(Lithuania) Jevgenij Novikov	n/a	—	—	—	Maritim Park Hotel, Riga
2014	(Lithuania) Ugnius Jankúnas	n/a	beat	(Netherlands) Jaimy van Bavel	n/a	—	—	—	Maritim Park Hotel, Riga
2015	(Latvia) Rihards Slisans	n/a	beat	(Lithuania) Ugnius Jankúnas	n/a	—	—	—	Bellevue Park Hotel, Riga
2016	(Latvia) Rihards Slisans (2)	n/a	beat	(Germany) Felix Wunsch	n/a	—	—	—	Bellevue Park Hotel, Riga
2017	(England) Cameron Anderson	n/a	beat	(Netherlands) Javanico Jansen	n/a	—	—	—	Bellevue Park Hotel, Riga
2018	(Russia) Roman Turkeyev	n/a	beat	(Netherlands) Javanico Jansen	n/a	—	—	—	Bellevue Park Hotel, Riga
2019	Ralfs Laumanis	n/a	beat	(Estonia) Patrick Passa	n/a	—	—	—	Bellevue Park Hotel, Riga

=== Boys ===
Year	Champion	Av.	Score	Runner-Up	Av.	Prize Money			Venue
Year	Champion	Av.	Score	Runner-Up	Av.	Total	Ch.	R.-Up	Venue
2022	(Latvia) Markuss Jansons	56.36	4 – 3	(Latvia) Daniels Delveris	56.77	€100	€50	€25	Bellevue Park Hotel, Riga
2023	Ralfs Laumanis	75.15	4 – 0	(Czech Republic) Petr Grecman	49.69	€100	€50	€25	Bellevue Park Hotel, Riga
2024	Jenson Walker	76.69	4 – 2	Ralfs Laumanis	75.89	€100	€50	€25	Bellevue Park Hotel, Riga

=== Girls ===
Year	Champion	Av.	Score	Runner-Up	Av.	Prize Money			Venue
Year	Champion	Av.	Score	Runner-Up	Av.	Total	Ch.	R.-Up	Venue
2022	(Lithuania) Milda Zdanauskaite	40.43	4 – 1	(Denmark) Camilla Madsen	39.64	€100	€50	€25	Bellevue Park Hotel, Riga
2023	(Latvia) Marta Roga	46.18	4 – 1	(Latvia) Ketija Ozola	43.04	€50	€25	€15	Bellevue Park Hotel, Riga
2024	(Iceland) Nadía Ósk Guðmundsdóttir	44.40	4 – 1	(Latvia) Amanda Kirilova	45.48	€50	€25	€15	Bellevue Park Hotel, Riga
