= Tomáš Houdek (ice hockey) =

Czech ice hockey player

- Born: 30 March 1981 (age 44); Třinec, Czechoslovakia
- Height: 6 ft 1 in (185 cm)
- Weight: 194 lb (88 kg; 13 st 12 lb)
- Position: Defence
- Shoots: Right
- Czechia4 team Former teams: SK Prostejov 1913; HC Oceláři Třinec; HC Slavia Praha; HC Hamé Zlín; HC Kladno; HC Slovan Ústečtí Lvi; HC Kometa Brno; HC Olomouc
- NHL draft: Undrafted
- Playing career: 2001–present

Tomáš Houdek (born 30 March 1981 in Třinec) is a Czech professional ice hockey defenceman who currently plays with HC Kometa Brno in the Czech Extraliga.

Houdek previously played for HC Oceláři Třinec, HC Slezan Opava, HC Olomouc, HC Hamé Zlín and HC Slovan Ústečtí Lvi.
