= Tomáš Houdek (darts player) =

Czech darts player

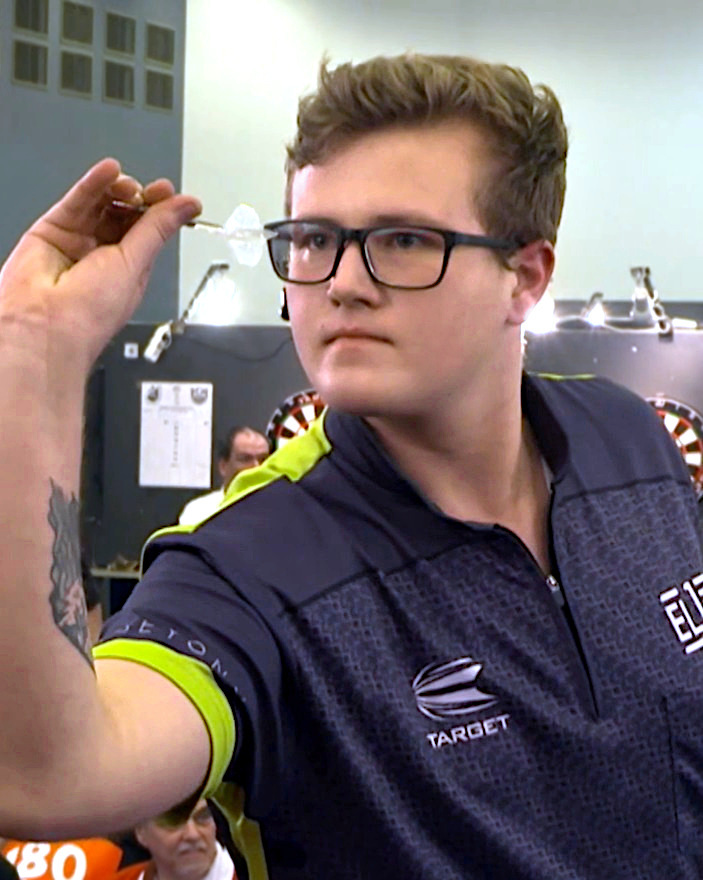
- Houdek - Czech Open Darts 2021

Personal information
- Born: 25 November 2003 (age 22) Czech Republic
- Home town: Nová Včelnice, Czech Republic

Sport
- Sport: Darts
- Playing since: 2017
- Darts: 22g Target
- Laterality: Right-handed

Organisation (see split in darts)
- BDO: 2019–2020
- PDC: 2021–
- WDF: 2019–

WDF major events – best performances
- World Masters: Last 128: 2022

Other tournament wins
- Years
Youth events
Czech Youth Ch'ship	2019
Czech Open	2019, 2021
Medal record
Men's Darts
Representing Czech Republic
WDF World Cup
Gold medal – first place	2019 Cluj	Youth's mixed pairs
Silver medal – second place	2019 Cluj	Boys pairs
WDF Europe Cup Youth
Gold medal – first place	2022 Budapest	Boys singles (U21)
Gold medal – first place	2022 Budapest	Boys pairs (U21)
Gold medal – first place	2022 Budapest	Boys team (U21)
Gold medal – first place	2022 Budapest	Boys overall (U21)
Silver medal – second place	2019 Ankara	Boys pairs
Bronze medal – third place	2019 Ankara	Boys team
EDU European Ch'ship
Gold medal – first place	2019 Caorle	Boys singles (U18)

Tomáš Houdek (born 25 November 2003) is a Czech professional darts player who plays in World Darts Federation (WDF) and Professional Darts Corporation (PDC) events. He won a gold medal in the 2022 WDF Europe Cup Youth and was a Czech Youth Champion. He has represented his country at the WDF Europe Cup.

== Career ==
Houdek started his darts career in August 2017 and in two years he won numerous international tournaments for youth players. In 2019, during the EDU European Darts Championship, he won the gold medal in the single youth competition, defeated Marcel Grossmann in the final match. In the same year, he played in the 2019 WDF World Cup youth competitions and won two medals in the pairs competition. In the mixed pairs competition, together with Anna Votavová, he won the gold medal, defeated another pair from the Czech Republic, Vilém Šedivý and Denisa Feklová, by 6–2 in legs. In the boys' pairs competition, together with Vilém Šedivý, won the silver medal, lost to Keelan Kay and Brad Phillips from England in the final match.

In 2019, again together with Vilém Šedivý, won the silver medal in the pairs competition at the 2019 WDF Europe Cup Youth. They lost in the final match to Jurjen van der Velde and Luke van der Kwast from the Netherlands. In the team competition, the youth team from the Czech Republic slightly lost to the Netherlands and took bronze medal. The coronavirus pandemic has slowed down Houdek's career as he has maintained a regular game in his home country.

In 2022, he was invited to participate in a special tournament held during the 2022 WDF Europe Cup Youth. Due to the cancellation of tournaments in 2020–2021 because the COVID-19 pandemic, it was decided to organize an additional tournament (WDF Europe U21 Cup) for players under 21 years of age. In the boys' under-21 singles event, he won the gold medal, defeated David Zaruba in the final by 6–5 in legs. The excellent result of the Czech national team in other competitions contributed to the victory in the general classification. Ultimately, Houdek returned from this tournament with four gold medals.

At the end of September 2022, he was selected by the national federation to participate in the 2022 WDF Europe Cup. On the second day of the tournament, he advanced to the second round of the pairs competition where he played together with Dalibor Šmolík. They were defeated by James Hurrell and Luke Littler from England by 3–4 in legs. On the third day of the tournament, he lost in the preliminary round match to Stefan Bellmont by 3–4 in legs. In the team competition, Czech team advanced to the second round, where he lost to England by 7–9 in legs.

== Performance timeline ==
Tournament	2022	2023
WDF Ranked televised events
World Masters	2R	
