= 2024 World Darts Championship =

2024 World Darts Championship may refer to:

- 2024 PDC World Darts Championship, organised by the Professional Darts Corporation (PDC), and also known as the 2023/24 Paddy Power World Darts Championship
- 2024 WDF World Darts Championship, organised by the World Darts Federation (WDF)
- 2025 PDC World Darts Championship, organised by the PDC, and also known as the 2024/25 Paddy Power World Darts Championship
