= Shane McGuirk =

Irish darts player (born 1995)

Personal information
- Nickname: "The Arrow"
- Born: 9 May 1995 (age 31) Castleblayney, County Monaghan, Ireland

Sport
- Sport: Darts
- Playing since: 2018
- Darts: 23g Target Signature
- Laterality: Right-handed
- Walk-on music: "We Will Rock You" by Queen

Organisation (see split in darts)
- BDO: 2018–2020
- PDC: 2020–present (Tour Card: 2026–present)
- WDF: 2018–2025
- Current world ranking: (PDC) 94 ▼1 (29 October 2026)

WDF major events – best performances
- World Championship: Winner (1): 2024
- World Masters: Last 32: 2018

PDC premier events – best performances
- UK Open: Last 160: 2020, 2021
- Masters: Last 32: 2026

Other tournament wins
- Years
Irish Open	2023
FCD Anniversary Open	2022
MODUS Super Series Weekly Winner	2025
Youth events
PDC Development Tour	2019

Shane McGuirk (born 9 May 1995) is an Irish professional darts player who competes in Professional Darts Corporation (PDC) events. A winner of the Irish Open and FCD Anniversary Open in the World Darts Federation (WDF), he defeated Paul Lim 6–3 to win the 2024 WDF World Darts Championship, becoming the first darts world champion from the Republic of Ireland. He subsequently earned a PDC Tour Card for the first time in 2026. McGuirk also won a title on the PDC Development Tour in 2019.

== Career ==
=== 2018–2021 ===
McGuirk reached the Last 16 of the 2018 World Masters, losing to 2015 BDO World Champion Scott Mitchell 3–1 in sets.

He had success on the PDC Development Tour in 2019, reaching two finals before winning his first Development Tour title in Event 13, defeating Keane Barry 5–4 in the final.

McGuirk attended UK Qualifying School (Q-School) in 2021, where he achieved a nine-dart finish but missed out on a PDC Tour Card by one point.

=== 2022–2023 ===
McGuirk won his first WDF title after beating Andy Baetens 5–4 in the final of the 2022 FCD Anniversary Open. He followed this by winning the 2023 Irish Open which granted him a spot at the 2024 WDF World Darts Championship.

=== 2024 ===
After finishing 35th on the UK Q-School Order of Merit, McGuirk competed in the 2024 PDC Challenge Tour series, averaging 100 in 5–2 victories over Max Hopp and Ryan O'Connor on his way to the quarter-finals at Challenge Tour 7 (CT7), where he lost to Dennie Olde Kalter 5–4 in a last-leg decider. He reached the semi-finals at CT8, losing to Andy Boulton 5–2. He reached another quarter-final at CT21, losing there to Dragutin Horvat 5–1. In his first round match at CT21, he averaged 119.29 in a 5–0 whitewash victory against Stefaan Henderyck.

McGuirk received call–ups for 2024 PDC Players Championship series events 9, 10, and 22 filling in as a reserve for an absent tour card holder virtue of his ranking on the Challenge Tour Order of Merit. McGuirk lost to Mario Vandenbogaerde 6–5 in a deciding leg in the first round of Players Championship 9 (PC9). At PC10 McGuirk defeated Nick Kenny 6–1 before losing to Ryan Joyce 6–2 in the second round. At PC22, he whitewashed Owen Roelofs 6–0 and won 6–2 against Vincent van der Voort, but was defeated by Mike De Decker, who averaged 101.42, 6–3 in the last 32.

At the 2024 WDF World Darts Championship, McGuirk entered the competition in the first round, where he defeated Mark Barilli 2–0. He then beat Edwin Torbjörnsson 3–0 without missing a dart at double. With 3–0, 4–0 and 5–0 wins over Brandon Weening, Peter Machin and François Schweyen respectively, McGuirk reached the final without losing a set. In the final, where he faced Paul Lim, McGuirk raced into a 4–0 lead against the Singaporean veteran. Lim brought it back to 4–1, which was McGuirk's first set lost in the tournament. McGuirk went 5–1 up, one set away from the title, before Lim won the next two sets to close the gap to 5–3. In the end, McGuirk won the final 6–3, whitewashing Lim 3–0 in the final set. He became the first player from the Republic of Ireland to win a senior darts world championship.

=== 2025–present ===
In his title defence at the 2025 WDF World Championship, McGuirk was eliminated in the quarter-finals, losing 4–1 to eventual champion Jimmy van Schie. In January 2026, McGuirk entered PDC Q-School and earned a PDC Tour Card for the first time, defeating Charlie Manby in his final match on day three. Later that month, he qualified for the main stages of the 2026 PDC World Masters, where he lost 3–1 to Nathan Aspinall.

== Personal life ==
Outside of darts, McGuirk was a former underage player with Aughnamullen GAA.

== World Championship results ==
=== WDF ===
- 2024: Winner (beat Paul Lim 6–3)
- 2025: Quarter-finals (lost to Jimmy van Schie 1–4)

== Career finals ==
=== WDF major finals: (1 title) ===
Legend
World Championship (1–0)

Outcome	No.	Year	Championship	Opponent in the final	Score (Note: (l) = score in legs, (s) = score in sets.)
Winner	1.	2024	World Darts Championship	Paul Lim	6–3 (s)

== Performance timeline ==
=== BDO ===
Tournament	2018
BDO Ranked televised events
World Masters	6R

=== WDF ===
Tournament	2023	2024	2025
WDF Ranked televised events
World Championship	DNP	W	QF
Irish Open	W	6R	5R

=== PDC ===
Tournament	2018	2019	2020	2021	2026
PDC Ranked televised events
World Masters	Did not qualify				1R
UK Open	DNQ		1R	1R	2R
PDC Non-ranked televised events
World Youth Championship	RR	RR	Did not participate		
Career statistics
Season-end ranking (PDC)	Not ranked			186	

==== PDC European Tour ====
Tournament	2026
European Darts Trophy	1R

==== PDC Players Championships ====
Season	1	2	3	4	5	6	7	8	9	10	11	12	13	14	15	16	17	18	19	20	21	22	23	24	25	26	27	28	29	30	31	32	33	34
2021 (Note: Not a Tour card holder)	Did not participate																				BAR; 1R	BAR; 3R	BAR; 1R	Did not participate										
2024	Did not participate								HIL; 1R	HIL; 2R	Did not participate												MIL; 3R	Did not participate										
2026	HIL; 4R	HIL; 2R	WIG; 1R	WIG; 2R	LEI; 1R	LEI; 2R	LEI; 1R	LEI; 2R	WIG; 1R	WIG; 3R	MIL; 2R	MIL; 1R	HIL; 1R	HIL; 1R	LEI; 1R	LEI; 2R	LEI; 2R	LEI; 1R	MIL; 2R	MIL; 2R	WIG; 3R	WIG; 3R	LEI; 2R	LEI; 2R	HIL; 2R	HIL; 2R	LEI; 1R	LEI; 3R	ROS; 1R	ROS; 2R	ROS; 1R	ROS; 1R	LEI; 2R	LEI; 2R

Performance Table Legend
W	Won the tournament	F	Finalist	SF	Semifinalist	QF	Quarterfinalist	#R; RR; L#	Lost in # round Round-robin; Last # stage	DQ	Disqualified
DNQ	Did not qualify	DNP	Did not participate	WD	Withdrew	NH	Tournament not held	#R; RR; L#	Lost in # round Round-robin; Last # stage	NYF	Not yet founded
