= Lex Paeshuyse =

Belgian darts player (born 2011)

Personal information
- Born: 6 September 2011 (age 15) Rijkevorsel, Belgium

Sport
- Sport: Darts
- Playing since: 2021
- Darts: 23g Signature
- Laterality: Right-handed
- Walk-on music: "Don't Stop Me Now" by Queen

Organisation (see split in darts)
- WDF: 2022–present

Other tournament wins
- Years
Youth events
Diamond Darts Open	2024
Four Nations Cup	2024
WDF Youth tournaments
Antwerp Open	2025
Bruges Open	2025
World Masters	2024
JDC Events
JDC Belgian Championship	2024
JDC World Championship	2024

Lex Paeshuyse (born 6 September 2011) is a Belgian darts player who competes in World Darts Federation (WDF) and Junior Darts Corporation (JDC) events.

Paeshuyse has found success in the WDF's youth system, most notably winning the 2024 WDF World Youth Masters. He also won the 2024 JDC World Darts Championship.

== Career ==
Paeshuyse made a strong entrance into youth tournaments in 2022, quickly finding success by winning multiple titles and defeating top-ranked players in various open competitions. In 2023, he reached the final of the youth event at the Belgium Open and represented his country in the Four Nations Cup, where he captured the boys' singles title.

In the final of the 2024 WDF World Youth Masters he defeated Mason Teese to win the tournament. On the same day, he qualified for the WDF World Darts Championship in the boys' competition.

In his debut quarter-finals match in the 2024 WDF World Youth Championship he defeated Ralfs Laumanis. In the semi-final match he lost to the eventual winner Archie Self. In the same month, he won the JDC World Darts Championship. On 21 December 2024, Paeshuyse defeated Daniel Stephenson 5–1 in the final match.
