= 1974 World Masters (darts) =

Phonogram World Masters

Tournament information
- Dates: 31 August 1974
- Venue: West Centre Hotel
- Location: Fulham
- Country: England
- Organisation(s): BDO
- Format: Sets
- Prize fund: £700
- Winner's share: £400

Champion(s)
- (England) Cliff Inglis

The 1974 Phonogram World Masters was the first major tournament on the BDO/WDF calendar for 1974. It took place from 31 August at the West Centre Hotel, Fulham.

The tournament featured the best 60 players from around the world. 24 winners of major tournaments from the last year and an English qualifying round consisting of 36 players (2 from each county). The 36 County players played down to a last 8 before joining the 24 invitees to make the first round.

== Prize money ==
Total Prize fund was £700

- Champion £400
- Runner-up £200
- Quarter-finalists £100
- 1st round losers £20

== The results ==
Players in bold denote match winners.

Preliminary round (best of 5 legs)
(England) John Kellard 3 v 1 (Gibraltar) Joe Goldwin
(England) Charlie Pitchers 1 vs 3 (Scotland) Harry Heenan
(England) Ron Stoucbbury 1 vs 3 (Belgium) Andre DeClerq
(England) Barry Luckham 3 vs 2 (Republic of Ireland) Seamus O'Brien
(Isle of Man) John Craine 3 vs 1 (Isle of Man) William Glassey
(England) Fredrick Turner 0 vs 3 (England) George Lee
(South Africa) Steve Rollings 1 vs 3 (Republic of Ireland) Jack McKenna
(United States) Joe Baltadonis 3 vs 2 (Republic of Ireland) Pat Mullings
(Wales) Ceri Morgan 3 vs 0 (Sweden) Stefan Lord
(England) Willie Etherington 1 vs 3 (United States) Jody Simkins

1st round Best of 5 legs
(Sweden) **Douglas Melander**	**3**
(United States) Joe Baltadonis	1
(Republic of Ireland) **Jack McKenna**	**3**
(England) Doug Priestner	0
(Scotland) **Harry Heenan**	**3**
(England) John Kellard	2
(Belgium) **Andre DeClerq**	**3**
(Wales) Dalys Elisas	1
(England) **Cliff Inglis**	**3**
(Scotland) Duncan Dinnie	0
(England) **John Bassett**	**3**
(Wales) Ceri Morgan	2
(England) **Barry Luckham**	**3**
(United States) Jody Simkins	1
(England) **George Lee**	**3**
(Isle of Man) John Craine	2

Quarter-finals; Best of 5 legs
(Sweden) **Douglas Melander**	**3**
(Republic of Ireland) Jack McKenna	0
(Scotland) **Harry Heenan**	**3**
(Belgium) Andre DeClerq	1
(England) **Cliff Inglis**	**3**
(England) John Bassett	2
(England) **Barry Luckham**	**3**
(England) George Lee	2

Semi-finals; Best of 5 legs
(Scotland) **Harry Heenan**	**3**
(Sweden) Douglas Melander	1
(England) **Cliff Inglis**	**3**
(England) Barry Luckham	1

Final; Best of 5 legs
(Scotland) Harry Heenan	2
(England) **Cliff Inglis**	**3**
