= World Masters (darts) =

Professional darts tournament

- Founded: 1974
- First season: 1974
- Organizing body: BDO (1974–2019); WDF (2022, 2024–)
- Country: England (1974–2019); Netherlands (2022); Hungary (2024–2025); United States (2026–)
- Most recent champions: (United States) Chris Lim (mens); (England) Gemma Hayter (womens); (Germany) Benjamin Dopfer (boys); (England) Ruby Grey (girls); (2026)
- Tournament format: Legs

The World Masters is a darts tournament, initially organised by the British Darts Organisation from 1974 and later by the World Darts Federation. It is one of the longest-running and most prestigious of the BDO/WDF tournaments. The tournament was originally sponsored by Phonogram before changing its sponsor in 1975 to darts board manufacturer, Winmau. The World Masters was originally contested as the best of 5 legs (first to 3) before later transitioning to the set format.

It was previously the final leg of the BDO's Grand Slam title of televised majors, along with the BDO World Darts Championship, International Darts League and World Darts Trophy, until the latter two tournaments were axed in 2008. The champion is referred to as the World Master.

The tournament was unseeded for most of its history and all players entered the main draw in the first round. Seedings were introduced for the first time in 2007 at the behest of the BBC to ensure the top players were present for the televised stages of the event. Thus, the top eight ranked players received a bye to the last-16.

After the collapse of the British Darts Organisation in September 2020, the World Darts Federation announced plans to launch the WDF World Masters. In December 2020, it was announced that the 2021 tournament will be held at De Bonte Wever in Assen, Netherlands. This was then pushed back to 2022 due to ongoing coronavirus restrictions. The new WDF version of the event changed the format from setplay to legplay for the first time, with significantly shorter matches. The event also moved to a biennial format. In 2024 a new host nation was announced as Budapest, Hungary was the host for the 2024 WDF World Masters.

In 2025 the Professional Darts Corporation rebranded their existing Masters tournament as the World Masters using a similar format to the original BDO version including its sponsorship by Winmau. As with both versions of the World Championships, the two World Masters events maintain separate lineage and heritage.

== List of tournament finals ==
=== Men's World Masters ===
Year	Champion	F. Av	Score	Runner-up	F. Av	Prize Money			Venue	Sponsor
Year	Champion	F. Av	Score	Runner-up	F. Av	Total	Ch.	R.-Up	Venue	Sponsor
1974	(England) Cliff Inglis	N/A	3–2	(Scotland) Harry Heenan	N/A	£800	£400	£200	West Centre Hotel, Fulham	Phonogram
1975	(Wales) Alan Evans	N/A	3–1	(Wales) David Jones	N/A	£2,000	£1,000	£500	West Centre Hotel, Fulham	Phonogram
1976	(England) John Lowe	N/A	3–0	(Wales) Phil Obbard	N/A	£2,000	£1,000	£500	West Centre Hotel, Fulham	Winmau
1977	(England) Eric Bristow	75.90	3–1	(England) Paul Reynolds	74.37	£3,000	£2,000	£500	Wembley Conference Centre	Winmau
1978	(England) Ronnie Davis	79.23	2–1	(England) Tony Brown	82.65	£4,751	£3,001	£1,000	Wembley Conference Centre	Winmau
1979	(England) Eric Bristow	81.93	2–0	(Canada) Allan Hogg	72.00	£6,251	£4,001	£1,250	Wembley Conference Centre	Winmau
1980	(England) John Lowe	84.69	2–0	(Scotland) Rab Smith	73.77	£6,251	£4,001	£1,250	Wembley Conference Centre	Winmau
1981	(England) Eric Bristow	92.04	2–1	(England) John Lowe	95.10	£7,800	£5,000	£1,500	Wembley Conference Centre	Winmau
1982	(England) Dave Whitcombe	87.09	2–1	(Scotland) Jocky Wilson	80.40	£10,950	£7,500	£1,750	Rainbow Suite, Kensington	Winmau
1983	(England) Eric Bristow	87.90	2–1	(England) Mike Gregory	87.90	£10,950	£7,500	£1,750	Rainbow Suite, Kensington	Winmau
1984	(England) Eric Bristow	101.16	3–1	(England) Keith Deller	86.55	£13,100	£7,500	£3,000	Rainbow Suite, Kensington	Winmau
1985	(England) Dave Whitcombe	89.49	3–0	(Northern Ireland) Ray Farrell	83.49	£15,000	£8,000	£3,000	Rainbow Suite, Kensington	Winmau
1986	(England) Bob Anderson	90.72	3–2	(Canada) Bob Sinnaeve	87.57	£15,000	£8,000	£3,000	Rainbow Suite, Kensington	Winmau
1987	(England) Bob Anderson	94.26	3–1	(England) John Lowe	90.81	£15,000	£8,000	£3,000	Rainbow Suite, Kensington	Winmau
1988	(England) Bob Anderson	87.51	3–2	(England) John Lowe	85.11	£15,000	£8,000	£3,000	Rainbow Suite, Kensington	Winmau
1989	(England) Peter Evison	92.67	3–2	(England) Eric Bristow	92.67	£9,600	£4,000	£2,000	Rainbow Suite, Kensington	Winmau
1990	(England) Phil Taylor	98.46	3–2	(Scotland) Jocky Wilson	91.85	£15,000	£8,000	£3,000	Ramada Inn. Lillie Road, West London	Winmau
1991	(England) Rod Harrington	89.88	3–2	(England) Phil Taylor	92.94	£14,000	£7,000	£3,000	Ramada Inn. Lillie Road, West London	Winmau
1992	(England) Dennis Priestley	102.27	3–2	(England) Mike Gregory	100.14	£14,000	£7,000	£3,000	Earls Court, London	Winmau
1993	(England) Steve Beaton	87.57	3–1	(Scotland) Les Wallace	91.50	£14,000	£7,000	£3,000	Earls Court, London	Winmau
1994	(Wales) Richie Burnett	93.57	3–2	(England) Steve Beaton	90.27	£14,000	£7,000	£3,000	Earls Court, London	Winmau
1995	(Belgium) Erik Clarys	94.17	3–0	(Wales) Richie Burnett	90.96	£13,100	£7,000	£2,500	Earls Court, London	Winmau
1996	(England) Colin Monk	92.70	3–2	(Wales) Richie Burnett	91.71	£13,100	£7,000	£2,500	Paragon Hotel, Lillie Road, London	Winmau
1997	(Australia) Graham Hunt	88.89	3–2	(England) Ronnie Baxter	91.26	£13,100	£7,000	£2,500	Paragon Hotel, Lillie Road, London	Winmau
1998	(Scotland) Les Wallace	90.72	3–2	(England) Alan Warriner-Little	86.04	£14,100	£8,000	£2,500	Lakeside Country Club, Frimley Green	Winmau
1999	(England) Andy Fordham	88.20	3–1	(England) Wayne Jones	81.87	£14,100	£8,000	£2,500	Lakeside Country Club, Frimley Green	Winmau
2000	(England) John Walton	90.75	3–2	(England) Mervyn King	86.82	£14,100	£8,000	£2,500	Lakeside Country Club, Frimley Green	Winmau
2001	(Netherlands) Raymond van Barneveld	95.64	4–2	(Finland) Jarkko Komula	95.16	£14,100	£8,000	£2,500	Lakeside Country Club, Frimley Green	Winmau
2002	(England) Mark Dudbridge	87.39	7–4	(England) Tony West	82.50	£16,800	£10,000	£3,000	Bridlington Spa	Winmau
2003	(England) Tony West	93.60	7–6	(Netherlands) Raymond van Barneveld	96.84	£16,800	£10,000	£3,000	Bridlington Spa	Winmau
2004	(England) Mervyn King	97.86	7–6	(England) Tony O'Shea	98.19	£21,800	£15,000	£3,000	Bridlington Spa	Winmau
2005	(Netherlands) Raymond van Barneveld	94.71	7–3	(Sweden) Göran Klemme	87.45	£21,800	£15,000	£3,000	Bridlington Spa	Winmau
2006	(Netherlands) Michael van Gerwen	94.50	7–5	(England) Martin Adams	93.69	£23,800	£15,000	£3,000	Leisure World, Bridlington	Winmau
2007	(Scotland) Robert Thornton	94.26	7–5	(England) Darryl Fitton	95.28	£50,000	£25,000	£10,000	Leisure World, Bridlington	Winmau
2008	(England) Martin Adams	95.55	7–6	(England) Scott Waites	97.26	£50,000	£25,000	£10,000	Bridlington Spa	Winmau
2009	(England) Martin Adams	90.15	7–6	(England) Robbie Green	86.07	£53,000	£25,000	£10,000	Bridlington Spa	Winmau
2010	(England) Martin Adams	94.29	7–3	(England) Stuart Kellett	90.99	£58,000	£25,000	£10,000	Hull City Hall, Kingston upon Hull	Winmau
2011	(England) Scott Waites	100.62	7–2	(England) Dean Winstanley	95.85	£55,000	£25,000	£10,000	Hull Arena, Kingston upon Hull	Winmau
2012	(England) Stephen Bunting	94.86	7–4	(England) Tony O'Shea	84.81	£60,000	£25,000	£10,000	Hull City Hall, Kingston upon Hull	Winmau
2013	(England) Stephen Bunting	96.11	7–0	(England) James Wilson	93.91	£60,000	£25,000	£10,000	Bonus Arena and Hull City Hall, Kingston upon Hull	Winmau
2014	(Wales) Martin Phillips	89.67	7–3	(England) Jamie Hughes	82.08	£60,000	£25,000	£10,000	Bonus Arena and Hull City Hall, Kingston upon Hull	Winmau
2015	(England) Glen Durrant	93.22	7–3	(United States) Larry Butler	92.53	£60,000	£25,000	£10,000	Hull City Hall, Kingston upon Hull	Winmau
2016	(England) Glen Durrant	92.46	6–3	(England) Mark McGeeney	86.28	£60,000	£25,000	£10,000	Lakeside Country Club, Frimley Green	Winmau
2017	(Poland) Krzysztof Ratajski	97.57	6–1	(England) Mark McGeeney	90.21	£60,000	£25,000	£10,000	Bridlington Spa, Bridlington	Winmau
2018	(England) Adam Smith-Neale	96.86	6–4	(England) Glen Durrant	99.68	£60,000	£25,000	£10,000	Bridlington Spa, Bridlington	Winmau
2019	(Republic of Ireland) John O'Shea	88.89	6–4	(England) Scott Waites	86.24	£49,500	£18,000	£7,500	Circus Tavern, Purfleet	One80, L-Style
2022	Wesley Plaisier	96.27	7–2 (l)	Barry Copeland	95.93	€35,000	€10,000	€5,000	(Netherlands) De Bonte Wever, Assen	Winmau
2024	Wesley Plaisier	96.33	7–3 (l)	(Germany) Kai Gotthardt	90.63	€35,000	€10,000	€5,000	(Hungary) Gerevich Aladár National Sports Hall, Budapest	Target
2025	Jimmy van Schie	97.11	7–2 (l)	(Canada) Jeff Smith	90.63	€35,000	€10,000	€5,000	(Hungary) Gerevich Aladár National Sports Hall, Budapest	Target
2026	Chris Lim	87.80	7–6 (l)	Brian Raman	81.06	$41,600	$12,000	$5,000	(United States) Rio Hotel & Casino, Las Vegas	Target

=== Women's World Masters ===
Year	Champion	F. Av	Sc. (legs)	Runner-Up	F. Av	Prize Money			Venue	Sponsor
Year	Champion	F. Av	Sc. (legs)	Runner-Up	F. Av	Total	Ch.	R.-Up	Venue	Sponsor
1982	(Wales) Ann Marie Davies	76.50	3–0	(England) Maureen Flowers	76.44	£2,500	£1,200	£500	Rainbow Suite, Kensington	Winmau
1983	(England) Sonja Ralphs		3–1	(England) Lil Coombes		£2,500	£1,200	£500	Rainbow Suite, Kensington	Winmau
1984	(England) Kathy Wones	50.67	3–0	(England) Sandy Earnshaw	47.97	£2,500	£1,200	£500	Rainbow Suite, Kensington	Winmau
1985	(New Zealand) Lilian Barnett	59.88	3–1	(England) Sonja Ralphs	50.97	£3,300	£1,500	£600	Rainbow Suite, Kensington	Winmau
1986	(England) Kathy Wones	58.14	3–1	(England) Jayne Kempster		£3,300	£1,500	£600	Rainbow Suite, Kensington	Winmau
1987	(Wales) Ann Thomas	62.13	3–2	(Scotland) Cathie McCulloch	62.22	£3,300	£1,500	£600	Rainbow Suite, Kensington	Winmau
1988	(England) Mandy Solomons	84.39	3–1	(England) Maureen Flowers	81.72	£3,300	£1,500	£600	Rainbow Suite, Kensington	Winmau
1989	(England) Mandy Solomons	86.64	3–1	(England) Sharon Colclough	77.25	£3,300	£1,500	£600	Rainbow Suite, Kensington	Winmau
1990	(Wales) Rhian Speed		3–1	(England) Deta Hedman		£3,300	£1,500	£600	Ramada Inn. Lillie Road, West London	Winmau
1991	(United States) Sandy Reitan		3–0	(Norway) Hege Løkken		£3,300	£1,500	£600	Ramada Inn. Lillie Road, West London	Winmau
1992	(Wales) Leeanne Maddock		3–2	(Wales) Sandra Greatbatch		£3,300	£1,500	£600	Earls Court, London	Winmau
1993	(England) Mandy Solomons		3–1	(United States) Kathy Maloney		£3,300	£1,500	£600	Earls Court, London	Winmau
1994	(England) Deta Hedman	76.20	3–2	(England) Mandy Solomons	69.09	£4,000	£1,600	£800	Earls Court, London	Winmau
1995	(England) Sharon Colclough	73.14	3–1	(United States) Stacy Bromberg	75.33	£3,600	£1,400	£700	Earls Court, London	Winmau
1996	(Scotland) Sharon Douglas	57.00	3–1	(Germany) Heike Ernst	63.45	£3,600	£1,400	£700	Paragon Hotel, Lillie Road, London	Winmau
1997	(England) Mandy Solomons	68.16	3–1	(Wales) Sandra Greatbatch	59.67	£3,600	£1,400	£700	Paragon Hotel, Lillie Road, London	Winmau
1998	(England) Karen Lawman	78.33	3–2	(England) Trina Gulliver	70.05	£4,200	£2,000	£700	Lakeside Country Club, Frimley Green	Winmau
1999	(Netherlands) Francis Hoenselaar	95.04	3–1	(England) Trina Gulliver	97.56	£5,200	£3,000	£700	Lakeside Country Club, Frimley Green	Winmau
2000	(England) Trina Gulliver	85.77	3–1	(Netherlands) Francis Hoenselaar	83.55	£5,200	£3,000	£700	Lakeside Country Club, Frimley Green	Winmau
2001	(Scotland) Anne Kirk	70.44	4–0	(United States) Marilyn Popp	60.39	£5,200	£3,000	£700	Lakeside Country Club, Frimley Green	Winmau
2002	(England) Trina Gulliver	68.10	4–1	(England) Karen Lawman	64.38	£6,200	£3,000	£1,000	Bridlington Spa Royal Hall	Winmau
2003	(England) Trina Gulliver	76.02	4–3	(England) Crissy Howat	73.86	£6,200	£3,000	£1,000	Bridlington Spa Royal Hall	Winmau
2004	(England) Trina Gulliver	96.84	4–1	(Netherlands) Francis Hoenselaar	81.21	£6,200	£3,000	£1,000	Bridlington Spa Royal Hall	Winmau
2005	(England) Trina Gulliver	90.81	4–1	(Netherlands) Francis Hoenselaar	71.88	£6,200	£3,000	£1,000	Bridlington Spa Royal Hall	Winmau
2006	(Netherlands) Francis Hoenselaar	76.56	4–3	(Netherlands) Karin Krappen	77.94	£6,200	£3,000	£1,000	Leisure World, Bridlington	Winmau
2007	(Netherlands) Karin Krappen	73.92	4–3	(England) Karen Lawman	75.90	£10,000	£5,000	£1,500	Leisure World, Bridlington	Winmau
2008	(Netherlands) Francis Hoenselaar	77.25	4–3	(Russia) Anastasia Dobromyslova	77.22	£10,000	£5,000	£1,500	Bridlington Spa Royal Hall	Winmau
2009	(England) Linda Ithurralde	68.10	4–3	(England) Trina Gulliver	67.83	£10,500	£5,000	£2,000	Bridlington Spa Royal Hall	Winmau
2010	(Wales) Julie Gore	70.41	4–1	(Netherlands) Francis Hoenselaar	74.46	£10,500	£5,000	£2,000	Hull City Hall, Kingston upon Hull	Winmau
2011	(England) Lisa Ashton	71.13	4–1	(England) Trina Gulliver	69.48	£10,500	£5,000	£2,000	Hull Arena, Kingston upon Hull	Winmau
2012	(Wales) Julie Gore	78.24	4–1	(England) Deta Hedman	78.21	£10,500	£5,000	£2,000	Costello Stadium and Hull City Hall, Kingston upon Hull	Winmau
2013	(England) Deta Hedman	76.38	4–1	(England) Rachel Brooks	66.58	£6,200	£3,000	£1,000	Bonus Arena and Hull City Hall, Kingston upon Hull	Winmau
2014	(Russia) Anastasia Dobromyslova	74.67	4–1	(England) Fallon Sherrock	72.00	£6,200	£3,000	£1,000	Bonus Arena and Hull City Hall, Kingston upon Hull	Winmau
2015	(Netherlands) Aileen de Graaf	82.50	5–4	(England) Lisa Ashton	83.79	£6,200	£3,000	£1,000	Hull City Hall, Kingston upon Hull	Winmau
2016	(England) Trina Gulliver	63.79	5–2	(England) Deta Hedman	64.94	£6,200	£3,000	£1,000	Lakeside Country Club, Frimley Green	Winmau
2017	(England) Lorraine Winstanley	76.89	5–2	(Australia) Corrine Hammond	72.78	£6,200	£3,000	£1,000	Bridlington Spa, Bridlington	Winmau
2018	(England) Lisa Ashton	84.17	5–2	(England) Casey Gallagher	77.46	£10,500	£5,000	£2,000	Bridlington Spa, Bridlington	Winmau
2019	(England) Lisa Ashton	85.50	5–4	(Russia) Anastasia Dobromyslova	82.76	£10,500	£5,000	£2,000	Circus Tavern, Purfleet	One80, L-Style
2022	Beau Greaves	80.52	6–0 (l)	Almudena Fajardo	74.40	€15,000	€5,000	€2,000	(Netherlands) De Bonte Wever, Assen	Winmau
2024	Beau Greaves	92.97	6–0 (l)	Rhian O'Sullivan	73.34	€15,000	€5,000	€2,000	(Hungary) Gerevich Aladár National Sports Hall, Budapest	Target
2025	(Scotland) Lorraine Hyde	71.09	6–5 (l)	(Norway) Rachna David	71.09	€15,000	€5,000	€2,000	(Hungary) Gerevich Aladár National Sports Hall, Budapest	Target
2026	(England) Gemma Hayter	81.55	6–3 (l)	(Italy) Aurora Fochesato	72.64	$18,300	$6,000	$2,500	(United States) Rio Hotel & Casino, Las Vegas	Target

=== World Youth Masters ===
Year	Champion	F. Av	Sc.	Runner-Up	F. Av	Prize Money			Venue	Sponsor
Year	Champion	F. Av	Sc.	Runner-Up	F. Av	Total	Ch.	R.-Up	Venue	Sponsor
1986	(Singapore) Harith Lim		3–0	(Australia) Rowan Barry		N/A	N/A	N/A	Rainbow Suite, Kensington	Winmau
1987	(Scotland) Sean Bell	84.18	3–1	(England) Mark Day	85.56	N/A	N/A	N/A	Rainbow Suite, Kensington	Winmau
1988	(England) Sean Dowling	70.11	3–2	(Wales) Paul Linwood	68.28	N/A	N/A	N/A	Rainbow Suite, Kensington	Winmau
1989	(England) Dennis Beisser		3–1	(Netherlands) Peter van Tilburg		N/A	N/A	N/A	Rainbow Suite, Kensington	Winmau
1990	(England) Craig Clancy	86.19	3–2	(England) Lee Murphy	82.20	N/A	N/A	N/A	Ramada Inn. Lillie Road, West London	Winmau
1991	(England) Michael Barnard		3–1	(Wales) Leeanne Maddock		N/A	N/A	N/A	Ramada Inn. Lillie Road, West London	Winmau
1992	(Wales) Leeanne Maddock		3–1	(Germany) Christian Lechtken		N/A	N/A	N/A	Earls Court, London	Winmau
1993	(England) Jamie Caven		3–1	(England) Lee Palfreyman		N/A	N/A	N/A	Earls Court, London	Winmau
1994	(Belgium) Steven de Brucker		3–0	(England) Lee Palfreyman		N/A	N/A	N/A	Earls Court, London	Winmau
1995	(England) Martin Whatmough	75.15	3–0	(Denmark) Nick Hjortoft		N/A	N/A	N/A	Earls Court, London	Winmau
1996	(Germany) Carsten Hoffmann	84.66	3–2	(England) Steve Smith	82.14	N/A	N/A	N/A	Paragon Hotel, Lillie Road, London	Winmau
1997	(England) Aaron Turner	75.15	3–1	(England) Leon Womack	76.23	N/A	N/A	N/A	Paragon Hotel, Lillie Road, London	Winmau
1998	(Wales) Paul Higgins	71.55	3–2	(Republic of Ireland) Keith Rooney	68.04	N/A	N/A	N/A	Lakeside Country Club, Frimley Green	Winmau

=== Boys' World Masters ===
Year	Champion	F. Av	Sc.	Runner-Up	F. Av	Prize Money			Venue	Sponsor
Year	Champion	F. Av	Sc.	Runner-Up	F. Av	Total	Ch.	R.-Up	Venue	Sponsor
1999	(England) Martin Brown	67.77	3–2	(Portugal) Daniel Moreira	71.19	N/A	N/A	N/A	Lakeside Country Club, Frimley Green	Winmau
2000	(England) Danny Ballard		3–0	(England) Ian Turner		N/A	N/A	N/A	Lakeside Country Club, Frimley Green	Winmau
2001	(England) Stephen Bunting		3–0	(Spain) José Rodríguez		N/A	N/A	N/A	Lakeside Country Club, Frimley Green	Winmau
2002	(Scotland) Shaun McDonald		3–1	(Northern Ireland) Ricky Dunlop		N/A	N/A	N/A	Bridlington Spa Royal Hall	Winmau
2003	(England) Kirk Shepherd	72.42	4–0	(Netherlands) Jeroen Verhoeven	68.34	N/A	N/A	N/A	Bridlington Spa Royal Hall	Winmau
2004	(Sweden) Oskar Lukasiak	76.98	4–1	(Netherlands) Jonny Nijs	71.67	N/A	N/A	N/A	Bridlington Spa Royal Hall	Winmau
2005	(Netherlands) Jonny Nijs	84.09	4–1	(Netherlands) Sven van Dun	83.46	N/A	N/A	N/A	Bridlington Spa Royal Hall	Winmau
2006	(Netherlands) Maarten Pape	75.84	4–1	(Netherlands) Jan Dekker	71.84	N/A	N/A	N/A	Leisure World, Bridlington	Winmau
2007	(England) Shaun Griffiths	85.89	4–0	(England) Michael Smith	71.58	N/A	N/A	N/A	Leisure World, Bridlington	Winmau
2008	(England) Shaun Griffiths	89.31	4–2	(Wales) Jamie Lewis	89.46	N/A	N/A	N/A	Bridlington Spa Royal Hall	Winmau
2009	(Wales) Jamie Lewis	81.54	4–1	(Netherlands) Jeffrey Stigter	80.73	N/A	N/A	N/A	Bridlington Spa Royal Hall	Winmau
2010	(England) Reece Robinson	80.67	4–1	(England) Kurtis Atkins	77.19	N/A	N/A	N/A	Hull City Hall, Kingston upon Hull	Winmau
2011	(Netherlands) Jimmy Hendriks	82.11	4–2	(England) Jake Jones	74.82	N/A	N/A	N/A	Hull Arena, Kingston upon Hull	Winmau
2012	(Netherlands) Jeffrey de Zwaan	77.04	4–3	(Belgium) Kenny Neyens	74.49	N/A	N/A	N/A	Costello Stadium and Hull City Hall, Kingston upon Hull	Winmau
2013	(England) Shaun Lovett	75.15	4–2	(Netherlands) Colin Roelofs	80.37	N/A	N/A	N/A	Bonus Arena and Hull City Hall, Kingston upon Hull	Winmau
2014	(Netherlands) Colin Roelofs	81.33	4–1	(England) Callan Rydz	84.24	N/A	N/A	N/A	Bonus Arena and Hull City Hall, Kingston upon Hull	Winmau
2015	(Netherlands) Justin van Tergouw	81.45	4–2	(England) Joshua Richardson	73.41	N/A	N/A	N/A	Hull City Hall, Kingston upon Hull	Winmau
2016	(Netherlands) Justin van Tergouw	79.62	4–1	(England) Owen Maiden	70.47	N/A	N/A	N/A	Lakeside Country Club, Frimley Green	Winmau
2017	(Germany) Nico Blum	76.60	4–3	(Republic of Ireland) Keane Barry	79.75	N/A	N/A	N/A	Bridlington Spa, Bridlington	Winmau
2018	(Netherlands) Jurjen van der Velde	89.04	4–3	(Republic of Ireland) Keane Barry	80.21	N/A	N/A	N/A	Bridlington Spa, Bridlington	Winmau
2019	(Republic of Ireland) Keane Barry	91.44	4–3	(England) Charlie Manby	76.98	£0	£0	£0	Circus Tavern, Purfleet	One80, L-Style
2022	Luke Littler	90.06	6–4 (l)	Peter Stewart	82.73	€1,280	€500	€250	(Netherlands) De Bonte Wever, Assen	Winmau
2024	Lex Paeshuyse	88.01	6–1 (l)	Mason Teese	86.08	€2,000	€800	€400	(Hungary) Gerevich Aladár National Sports Hall, Budapest	Target
2025	Mitchell Lawrie	95.46	6–3 (l)	Craig Devlin	92.68	€2,000	€800	€400	(Hungary) Gerevich Aladár National Sports Hall, Budapest	Target
2026	(Germany) Benjamin Dopfer	84.93	6–2 (l)	(Germany) Eric Petereit	75.99	$3,020	$1,000	$500	(United States) Rio Hotel & Casino, Las Vegas	Target

=== Girls' World Masters ===
Year	Champion	F. Av	Sc.	Runner-Up	F. Av	Prize Money			Venue	Sponsor
Year	Champion	F. Av	Sc.	Runner-Up	F. Av	Total	Ch.	R.-Up	Venue	Sponsor
1999	(Wales) Janine Gough	53.07	3–1	(England) Carly Ellis	51.42	N/A	N/A	N/A	Lakeside Country Club, Frimley Green	Winmau
2000	(Wales) Janine Gough (2)	68.32	3–0	(Russia) Anastasia Dobromyslova	61.34	N/A	N/A	N/A	Lakeside Country Club, Frimley Green	Winmau
2001	(Russia) Anastasia Dobromyslova	65.52	3–1	(Denmark) Jeanet Thomassen	62.88	N/A	N/A	N/A	Lakeside Country Club, Frimley Green	Winmau
2002	(Scotland) Lynsey McDonald		3–1	(Netherlands) Nancy Tobi		N/A	N/A	N/A	Bridlington Spa Royal Hall	Winmau
2003	(England) Stevie Riggs	46.20	4–2	(England) Samantha Petchey	45.51	N/A	N/A	N/A	Bridlington Spa Royal Hall	Winmau
2004	(Russia) Irene Adrianova	49.26	4–2	(Netherlands) Chantal Snijders	50.37	N/A	N/A	N/A	Bridlington Spa Royal Hall	Winmau
2005	(England) Laura Tye	67.05	4–2	(Netherlands) Carla Molema	65.88	N/A	N/A	N/A	Bridlington Spa Royal Hall	Winmau
2006	(Wales) Kimberley Lewis	63.24	4–2	(Netherlands) Thea Kaaijk	67.35	N/A	N/A	N/A	Leisure World, Bridlington	Winmau
2007	(Wales) Kimberley Lewis (2)	69.33	4–2	(Scotland) Lorraine Hyde	57.99	N/A	N/A	N/A	Leisure World, Bridlington	Winmau
2008	(Sweden) Linda Odén	61.29	4–0	(Netherlands) Lynn Poolen	52.29	N/A	N/A	N/A	Bridlington Spa Royal Hall	Winmau
2009	(England) Zoe Jones	69.27	4–1	(Scotland) Emily Davidson	55.02	N/A	N/A	N/A	Bridlington Spa Royal Hall	Winmau
2010	(England) Zoe Jones (2)		4–0	(Sweden) Sarah Rosén		N/A	N/A	N/A	Hull City Hall, Kingston upon Hull	Winmau
2011	(Scotland) Emily Davidson	63.27	4–0	(Wales) Alannah Waters	59.28	N/A	N/A	N/A	Hull Arena, Kingston upon Hull	Winmau
2012	(England) Fallon Sherrock		4–1	(Germany) Ann-Kathrin Wigmann		N/A	N/A	N/A	Costello Stadium and Hull City Hall, Kingston upon Hull	Winmau
2013	(England) Casey Gallagher	75.15	4–0	(Northern Ireland) Kayleigh O'Neill	55.65	N/A	N/A	N/A	Bonus Arena and Hull City Hall, Kingston upon Hull	Winmau
2014	(Republic of Ireland) Robyn Byrne	58.38	4–0	(England) Beau Greaves	47.37	N/A	N/A	N/A	Bonus Arena and Hull City Hall, Kingston upon Hull	Winmau
2015	(England) Danielle Ashton	46.38	4–1	(England) Rebecca Graham	45.6	N/A	N/A	N/A	Hull City Hall, Kingston upon Hull	Winmau
2016	(Russia) Veronika Koroleva	61.86	4–3	(England) Beau Greaves	65.28	N/A	N/A	N/A	Lakeside Country Club, Frimley Green	Winmau
2017	(England) Beau Greaves	63.96	4–0	(Republic of Ireland) Katie Sheldon	60.77	N/A	N/A	N/A	Bridlington Spa, Bridlington	Winmau
2018	(England) Beau Greaves (2)	76.10	4–0	(Canada) Hayley Crowley	67.24	N/A	N/A	N/A	Bridlington Spa, Bridlington	Winmau
2019	(Republic of Ireland) Katie Sheldon	63.96	4–3	(Scotland) Sophie McKinlay	63.42	£0	£0	£0	Circus Tavern, Purfleet	One80, L-Style
2022	Paige Pauling	71.42	5–2 (l)	Iida Lanko	67.89	€515	€250	€125	(Netherlands) De Bonte Wever, Assen	Winmau
2024	Paige Pauling (2)	69.58	5–0 (l)	Nicole Sescu Gal	57.85	€800	€400	€200	(Hungary) Gerevich Aladár National Sports Hall, Budapest	Target
2025	Rebecca Allen	65.00	5–3 (l)	Ruby Grey	61.16	€800	€400	€200	(Hungary) Gerevich Aladár National Sports Hall, Budapest	Target
2026	(England) Ruby Grey	55.26	5–0 (l)	(England) Paige Pauling	53.64	$1,260	$500	$250	(United States) Rio Hotel & Casino, Las Vegas	Target

== Records ==
Most men's tournament wins 5 - Eric Bristow.

Bob Anderson and Martin Adams have both won 3 times (also both achieving 'hat tricks' by winning in three consecutive years), while Dave Whitcombe, John Lowe, Raymond van Barneveld, Stephen Bunting, Glen Durrant and Wesley Plaisier have all won the Masters twice.

Youngest champion Michael van Gerwen (2006) aged 17 years, 174 days, who eclipsed the record of Eric Bristow

Double Champion Leeanne Maddock (1992) aged 17 years won both the youth title and the women's title.

Joint World Championship & Masters Champions Only seven players have ever won the World Masters and the World Championship in the same season. Eric Bristow achieved the feat three times (1979 Masters 1980 World, 1983–84 and 1984–85). Bob Anderson (1987–88), Richie Burnett (1994–95), John Walton (2000–01), Martin Adams (2009–10 and 2010–11), Stephen Bunting (2013–14) and Glen Durrant (2016–17) were the others. There have been two other instances of players holding both championships at the same time (Phil Taylor 1990 and Raymond van Barneveld 2005) - but these were not during the same season which is considered to end with the World Championship.

Not Dropping A Set Stephen Bunting's 2013 win was achieved without dropping a set.

There are 15 players who have won the Masters and the BDO World Championship during their careers: John Lowe, Eric Bristow, Bob Anderson, Phil Taylor, Dennis Priestley, Richie Burnett, Steve Beaton, Raymond van Barneveld, Les Wallace, John Walton, Andy Fordham, Martin Adams, Scott Waites, Stephen Bunting, and Glen Durrant. Additionally, Michael van Gerwen won the Masters in 2006 and has since won the PDC World Championship three times, but not the BDO World Championship.

== Media coverage ==
- 1974–1988 ITV
- 1989 Not broadcast
- 1990 The Sports Channel (part of the short-lived satellite TV service BSB)
- 1991–1992 Sky Sports
- 1993–1994 Wire TV
- 1995 L!VE TV (highlights on the ITV night time programme 'Sport AM' as well as on the HTV Wales programme 'Top Sport')
- 1996–2000 Eurosport
- 2001–2010 BBC
- 2011–2012 ESPN
- 2013–2015 Eurosport
- 2016 Premier Sports
- 2017 Eurosport
- 2018 No TV Broadcaster (streamed on YouTube and Winmau TV)
- 2019 Eurosport
- 2022 No TV Broadcaster (streamed on YouTube)
- 2024 Sport 1 & Sport 2 (Hungary) & Streamed on YouTube

The 2011 tournament was also shown in the United States for the first time with ESPN3 broadcasting it.

== See also ==
- WDF World Darts Championship
