= 2024 WDF World Darts Championship =

Tournament information
- Dates: 29 November – 8 December 2024
- Venue: Lakeside Country Club
- Location: Frimley Green, Surrey, England
- Organisation(s): World Darts Federation (WDF)
- Format: Sets
- Prize fund: £221,000 (total)
- Winner's share: £50,000 (men) £25,000 (women) £3,000 (boys) £1,500 (girls)
- High checkout: 164 László Kádár

Champion(s)
- Shane McGuirk (IRL) (men); Beau Greaves (ENG) (women); Archie Self (ENG) (boys); Paige Pauling (ENG) (girls)

The 2024 WDF World Darts Championship (known for sponsorship reasons as the 2024 Lakeside WDF World Championship) was the third edition of the WDF World Darts Championship organised by the World Darts Federation (WDF). The tournament was held at the Lakeside Country Club in Frimley Green, Surrey, England.

Andy Baetens was the defending men's champion, but was not able to defend his title after winning a PDC Tour Card in January 2024. Beau Greaves secured her third women's title by beating Sophie McKinlay, having beaten Aileen de Graaf in the 2023 final.

Shane McGuirk defeated Paul Lim 6–3 in the men's final to become the first World Darts Champion from the Republic of Ireland. 70-year-old Lim also became the oldest darts player to reach a World Championship final.

== Prize money ==
There was a slight decrease in prize money from the previous edition, although the winners of both senior tournaments received the same as the previous year.

Position	Prize money			
Position	Men	Women	Boys	Girls
Winner	£50,000	£25,000	£3,000	£1,500
Runner-up	£16,000	£8,000	£1,500	£1,000
Semi-finalist	£8,000	£4,000	£1,000	£500
Quarter-finalist	£4,000	£2,000	£500	—N/a
Last 16	£2,000	£1,000	—N/a	—N/a
Last 24	—N/a	£750	—N/a	—N/a
Last 32	£1,250	—N/a	—N/a	—N/a
Last 48	£750	—N/a	—N/a	—N/a
Event Totals	£146,000	£63,000	£8,500	£3,500
Overall Total	£221,000			

== Schedule ==
Friday, 29 November

Game #	Event	Round	Player 1	Score	Player 2	Set 1	Set 2	Set 3
01	Men's	1	Brian Raman 87.30	2–1	Corné Groeneveld 87.79	0–3	3–2	3–1
02	Men's	1	Scott Walters 67.70	2–0	Craig Brown 69.88	3–0	3–2	—N/a
03	Men's	1	François Schweyen 87.56	2–0	Michael Cassar 82.77	3–2	3–0	—N/a
04	Men's	1	Carl Wilkinson 80.02	2–0	Jacob Taylor 81.26	3–2	3–2	—N/a

Saturday, 30 November

Game #	Event	Round	Player 1	Score	Player 2	Set 1	Set 2	Set 3	Set 4	Set 5
05	Men's	1	Jordan Brooks 85.74	1–2	Jun Matsuda 83.81	3–2	0–3	2–3	—N/a	—N/a
06	Women's	1	Anca Zijlstra 64.16	0–2	Jitka Císařová 77.74	0–3	0–3	—N/a	—N/a	—N/a
07	Men's	1	Mark Barilli 71.20	0–2	Shane McGuirk 92.81	2–3	0–3	—N/a	—N/a	—N/a
08	Women's	1	Wendy Harper 62.79	2–0	Gréta Tekauer 57.69	3–2	3–1	—N/a	—N/a	—N/a
09	Men's	1	Patrik Kovács 74.33	0–2	Björn Lejon 80.25	1–3	2–3	—N/a	—N/a	—N/a
10	Men's	1	Matthew Edgar 80.34	0–2	Jarno Bottenberg 88.27	0–3	2–3	—N/a	—N/a	—N/a
11	Women's	1	Amanda Loch 60.11	0–2	Kirsi Viinikainen 71.47	0–3	1–3	—N/a	—N/a	—N/a
12	Men's	2	Danny Porter 76.67	0–3	François Schweyen 79.86	1–3	1–3	1–3	—N/a	—N/a
13	Women's	1	Kirsty Hutchinson 62.89	2–1	Veronika Ihász 55.61	3–1	2–3	3–2	—N/a	—N/a
14	Men's	2	Martyn Turner 84.30	1–3	Brian Raman 87.71	3–2	2–3	1–3	2–3	—N/a

Sunday, 1 December

Game #	Event	Round	Player 1	Score	Player 2	Set 1	Set 2	Set 3	Set 4	Set 5
15	Men's	1	Sybren Gijbels 80.31	2–1	Kevin Luke 78.36	1–3	3–1	3–2	—N/a	—N/a
16	Women's	1	Lorraine Hyde 72.24	1–2	Mayumi Ouchi 69.70	1–3	3–2	0–3	—N/a	—N/a
17	Men's	1	James Beeton 85.34	2–1	Bradley Kirk 80.58	3–2	0–3	3–1	—N/a	—N/a
18	Women's	1	Paula Murphy 62.28	2–0	Paula Jacklin 59.04	3–0	3–1	—N/a	—N/a	—N/a
19	Men's	2	Edwin Torbjörnsson 87.93	0–3	Shane McGuirk 96.16	0–3	0–3	2–3	—N/a	—N/a
20	Men's	1	Aaron Turner 79.05	2–0	Jeff Springer 74.04	3–1	3–1	—N/a	—N/a	—N/a
21	Women's	1	Lisa Ashton 76.22	1–2	Sophie McKinlay 76.37	1–3	3–1	2–3	—N/a	—N/a
22	Men's	2	Cliff Prior 74.34	3–1	Scott Walters 71.25	0–3	3–2	3–0	3–0	—N/a
23	Women's	2	Nicole Regnaud 68.45	2–0	Wendy Harper 59.94	3–1	3–2	—N/a	—N/a	—N/a
24	Men's	1	Mike Gillet 91.64	2–0	Ky Smith 74.18	3–1	3–1	—N/a	—N/a	—N/a

Monday, 2 December

Game #	Event	Round	Player 1	Score	Player 2	Set 1	Set 2	Set 3	Set 4	Set 5
25	Men's	1	Dennis Nilsson 84.26	2–0	Howard Jones 72.77	3–1	3–1	—N/a	—N/a	—N/a
26	Women's	1	Lerena Rietbergen 59.37	2–0	Maud Jansson 51.86	3–1	3–0	—N/a	—N/a	—N/a
27	Men's	1	László Kádár 87.11	1–2	Hannes Schnier 90.91	1–3	3–2	2–3	—N/a	—N/a
28	Men's	1	Darren Johnson 78.72	1–2	Reece Colley 82.38	0–3	3–0	1–3	—N/a	—N/a
29	Men's	1	Moreno Blom 77.88	0–2	Paul Lim 90.26	1–3	1–3	—N/a	—N/a	—N/a
30	Women's	2	Deta Hedman 68.73	2–1	Kirsty Hutchinson 67.02	1–3	3–0	3–0	—N/a	—N/a
31	Men's	2	Brandon Weening 82.34	3–1	Jun Matsuda 79.24	3–1	1–3	3–1	3–2	—N/a
32	Men's	2	Peter Machin 88.08	3–0	Mike Gillet 81.20	3–0	3–2	3–1	—N/a	—N/a

Tuesday, 3 December

Game #	Event	Round	Player 1	Score	Player 2	Set 1	Set 2	Set 3	Set 4	Set 5
33	Men's	2	Benjamin Pratnemer 85.62	0–3	Carl Wilkinson 85.02	2–3	1–3	0–3	—N/a	—N/a
34	Women's	2	Desi Mercer 61.28	0–2	Jitka Císařová 66.40	1–3	0–3	—N/a	—N/a	—N/a
35	Men's	2	Thomas Junghans 85.40	3–2	James Beeton 82.62	1–3	3–0	2–3	3–1	3–0
36	Men's	2	Ryan Hogarth 80.56	1–3	Jarno Bottenberg 89.11	3–2	0–3	1–3	1–3	—N/a
37	Men's	2	Jimmy van Schie 98.98	3–0	Björn Lejon 85.37	3–1	3–1	3–0	—N/a	—N/a
38	Women's	2	Beau Greaves 82.89	2–0	Kirsi Viinikainen 78.97	3–1	3–1	—N/a	—N/a	—N/a
39	Men's	2	Kai Fan Leung 87.44	2–3	Paul Lim 85.50	2–3	0–3	3–1	3–0	1–3
40	Men's	2	Neil Duff 90.67	3–2	Reece Colley 90.10	2–3	3–2	1–3	3–2	3–0

Wednesday, 4 December

Game #	Event	Round	Player 1	Score	Player 2	Set 1	Set 2	Set 3	Set 4	Set 5
41	Men's	2	Barry Copeland 83.98	3–0	Aaron Turner 73.77	3–0	3–0	3–2	—N/a	—N/a
42	Women's	2	Aletta Wajer 74.28	2–1	Paula Murphy 67.96	3–1	1–3	3–0	—N/a	—N/a
43	Men's	2	Liam Maendl-Lawrance 73.84	2–3	Sybren Gijbels 80.81	2–3	3–1	3–1	1–3	1–3
44	Men's	2	Jason Brandon 88.85	3–0	Hannes Schnier 84.64	3–0	3–1	3–0	—N/a	—N/a
45	Men's	2	Gary Stone 87.00	3–2	Dennis Nilsson 86.90	3–2	2–3	0–3	3–0	3–1
46	Women's	2	Rhian O'Sullivan 65.08	0–2	Lerena Rietbergen 77.84	2–3	0–3	—N/a	—N/a	—N/a
47	Men's	3	François Schweyen 89.34	3–2	Brian Raman 88.55	3–2	2–3	2–3	3–2	3–1
48	Men's	3	Brandon Weening 81.68	0–3	Shane McGuirk 93.62	0–3	1–3	2–3	—N/a	—N/a

Thursday, 5 December

Game #	Event	Round	Player 1	Score	Player 2	Set 1	Set 2	Set 3	Set 4	Set 5
49	Men's	3	Carl Wilkinson 80.99	2–3	Thomas Junghans 83.85	3–2	1–3	0–3	3–2	1–3
50	Boys'	QF	Ralfs Laumanis 81.65	0–2	Lex Paeshuyse 92.81	0–3	2–3	—N/a	—N/a	—N/a
51	Men's	3	Peter Machin 81.13	3–1	Cliff Prior 77.07	2–3	3–0	3–1	3–0	—N/a
52	Women's	2	Aileen de Graaf 77.85	2–0	Mayumi Ouchi 67.56	3–1	3–2	—N/a	—N/a	—N/a
53	Men's	3	Sybren Gijbels 81.26	0–3	Jason Brandon 87.68	0–3	2–3	1–3	—N/a	—N/a
54	Men's	3	Neil Duff 86.53	3–2	Barry Copeland 86.03	2–3	3–2	3–1	2–3	3–2
55	Boys'	QF	Kendji Steinbach 80.99	1–2	Archie Self 81.12	2–3	3–0	1–3	—N/a	—N/a
56	Men's	3	Jimmy van Schie 94.07	1–3	Jarno Bottenberg 92.31	1–3	2–3	3–2	0–3	—N/a
57	Women's	2	Irina Armstrong 71.92	1–2	Sophie McKinlay 69.22	3–2	2–3	0–3	—N/a	—N/a
58	Men's	3	Paul Lim 85.66	3–2	Gary Stone 83.67	3–2	2–3	0–3	3–0	3–0

Friday, 6 December

Game #	Event	Round	Player 1	Score	Player 2	Set 1	Set 2	Set 3	Set 4	Set 5	Set 6	Set 7
59	Boys'	QF	Balázs Szoták 62.86	0–2	Florian Preis 77.08	0–3	0–3	—N/a	—N/a	—N/a	—N/a	—N/a
60	Women's	QF	Lerena Rietbergen 66.01	2–1	Aletta Wajer 67.03	2–3	3–1	3–1	—N/a	—N/a	—N/a	—N/a
61	Men's	QF	François Schweyen 88.53	4–0	Thomas Junghans 85.69	3–2	3–1	3–1	3–0	—N/a	—N/a	—N/a
62	Women's	QF	Aileen de Graaf 68.21	0–2	Sophie McKinlay 72.65	1–3	2–3	—N/a	—N/a	—N/a	—N/a	—N/a
63	Men's	QF	Shane McGuirk 89.28	4–0	Peter Machin 86.94	3–1	3–1	3–2	3–2	—N/a	—N/a	—N/a
64	Boys'	QF	Jenson Walker 92.56	2–0	Mason Teese 81.98	3–1	3–1	—N/a	—N/a	—N/a	—N/a	—N/a
65	Women's	QF	Deta Hedman 73.53	2–0	Nicole Regnaud 67.09	3–1	3–2	—N/a	—N/a	—N/a	—N/a	—N/a
66	Men's	QF	Neil Duff 83.05	3–4	Jason Brandon 85.37	2–3	0–3	2–3	3–2	3–2	3–2	2–3
67	Women's	QF	Beau Greaves 79.89	2–0	Jitka Císařová 70.93	3–1	3–1	—N/a	—N/a	—N/a	—N/a	—N/a
68	Men's	QF	Jarno Bottenberg 86.57	3–4	Paul Lim 85.47	2–3	3–2	2–3	3–1	1–3	3–0	1–3

Saturday, 7 December

Game #	Event	Round	Player 1	Score	Player 2	Set 1	Set 2	Set 3	Set 4	Set 5	Set 6	Set 7	Set 8	Set 9
69	Girls'	SF	Paige Pauling 65.79	2–0	Jentl Fransen 49.65	3–0	3–1	—N/a	—N/a	—N/a	—N/a	—N/a	—N/a	—N/a
70	Boys'	SF	Jenson Walker 82.86	2–1	Florian Preis 82.56	3–2	1–3	3–0	—N/a	—N/a	—N/a	—N/a	—N/a	—N/a
71	Women's	SF	Sophie McKinlay 70.05	3–1	Lerena Rietbergen 69.10	1–3	3–2	3–0	3–2	—N/a	—N/a	—N/a	—N/a	—N/a
72	Men's	SF	François Schweyen 84.73	0–5	Shane McGuirk 92.72	1–3	2–3	0–3	0–3	1–3	—N/a	—N/a	—N/a	—N/a
73	Girls'	SF	Sophie McKinlay 72.59	2–0	Aurora Fochesato 69.89	3–1	3–1	—N/a	—N/a	—N/a	—N/a	—N/a	—N/a	—N/a
74	Boys'	SF	Archie Self 89.66	2–0	Lex Paeshuyse 83.73	3–1	3–0	—N/a	—N/a	—N/a	—N/a	—N/a	—N/a	—N/a
75	Women's	SF	Beau Greaves 86.16	3–0	Deta Hedman 78.69	3–1	3–1	3–1	—N/a	—N/a	—N/a	—N/a	—N/a	—N/a
76	Men's	SF	Paul Lim 83.62	5–0	Jason Brandon 80.82	3–1	3–0	3–0	3–0	3–2	—N/a	—N/a	—N/a	—N/a

Sunday, 8 December

Game #	Event	Round	Player 1	Score	Player 2	Set 1	Set 2	Set 3	Set 4	Set 5	Set 6	Set 7	Set 8	Set 9	Set 10	Set 11
77	Girls'	F	Paige Pauling 73.88	2–0	Sophie McKinlay 71.92	3–1	3–1	—N/a	—N/a	—N/a	—N/a	—N/a	—N/a	—N/a	—N/a	—N/a
78	Boys'	F	Jenson Walker 84.76	2–3	Archie Self 81.34	3–1	1–3	1–3	3–2	0–3	—N/a	—N/a	—N/a	—N/a	—N/a	—N/a
79	Women's	F	Beau Greaves 83.92	4–1	Sophie McKinlay 73.81	2–3	3–0	3–0	3–1	3–1	—N/a	—N/a	—N/a	—N/a	—N/a	—N/a
80	Men's	F	Shane McGuirk 90.31	6–3	Paul Lim 83.76	3–2	3–2	3–0	3–1	2–3	3–1	2–3	1–3	3–0	—N/a	—N/a

== Men's ==
=== Format and qualifiers ===
48 players played for the men's title, with Danny Porter of Australia being the top seed. The sixteen seeded players (decided by the WDF World Rankings) entered in Round 2, with the other 32 entrants began in Round 1. Fan favourite Paul Lim played in his 26th World Championship across the BDO/WDF and PDC. Six players rejected the opportunity to play in the Finals in order to play at the 2025 PDC World Darts Championship, including 2023 quarter-finalist Wesley Plaisier.

1–16 in WDF Rankings
Seeded in second round

1. Danny Porter (Second round)
2. Jimmy van Schie (Third round)
3. Neil Duff (Quarter-finals)
4. Brandon Weening (Third round)
5. Peter Machin (Quarter-finals)
6. (Germany) Liam Maendl-Lawrance (Second round)
7. Kai Fan Leung (Second round)
8. Benjamin Pratnemer (Second round)
9. Thomas Junghans (Quarter-finals)
10. Gary Stone (Third round)
11. (United States) Jason Brandon (Semi-finals)
12. Cliff Prior (Third round)
13. Edwin Torbjörnsson (Second round)
14. Barry Copeland (Third round)
15. Ryan Hogarth (Second round)
16. Martyn Turner (Second round)

Major Winner Wildcard
First round

1. Jarno Bottenberg (Quarter-finals)
2. Reece Colley (Second round)
3. Howard Jones (First round)
4. Jacob Taylor (First round)
5. Ky Smith (First round)
6. Shane McGuirk (Winner)

WDF Regional Table Qualifier
First round

1. Paul Lim (Runner-up)
2. Jun Matsuda (Second round)
3. Patrik Kovács (First round)
4. Craig Brown (First round)
5. Björn Lejon (Second round)
6. Carl Wilkinson (Third round)
7. Kevin Luke (First round)

Qualifiers
First round

1. Jeff Springer (First round)
2. Bradley Kirk (First round)
3. Corné Groeneveld (First round)

WDF Ranking non-qualified
First round

1. Moreno Blom (First round)
2. (England) Darren Johnson (First round)
3. Matthew Edgar (First round)
4. François Schweyen (Semi-finals)
5. Dennis Nilsson (Second round)
6. László Kádár (First round)
7. Mark Barilli (First round)
8. Scott Walters (Second round)
9. Jordan Brooks (First Round)
10. Mike Gillet (Second round)
11. James Beeton (Second round)
12. Brian Raman (Third round)
13. Sybren Gijbels (Third round)
14. Aaron Turner (Second round)
15. Hannes Schnier (Second round)
16. Michael Cassar (First round)

=== Draw ===
==== Finals ====
Quarter-finals (best of 7 sets); 6 December
François Schweyen 88.53	4
9	Thomas Junghans 85.69	0
Shane McGuirk 89.28	4
5	Peter Machin 86.94	0
Jarno Bottenberg 86.57	3
Paul Lim 85.47	4
3	Neil Duff 83.05	3
11	Jason Brandon 85.37	4

Semi-finals (best of 9 sets); 7 December
François Schweyen 84.73	0
Shane McGuirk 92.72	5
Paul Lim 83.62	5
11	Jason Brandon 80.82	0

Final (best of 11 sets); 8 December
Shane McGuirk 90.31	6
Paul Lim 83.76	3

==== Rounds 1–4 ====
First round (best of 3 sets); 29 November - 2 December
François Schweyen 87.56	2
Michael Cassar 82.77	0
Brian Raman 87.30	2
Corné Groeneveld 87.79	1
Carl Wilkinson 80.02	2
Jacob Taylor 81.26	0
James Beeton 85.34	2
Bradley Kirk 80.58	1
Jordan Brooks 85.74	1
Jun Matsuda 83.81	2
Mark Barilli 71.20	0
Shane McGuirk 92.81	2
Mike Gillet 91.64	2
Ky Smith 74.18	0
Scott Walters 67.70	2
Craig Brown 69.88	0
Patrik Kovács 74.33	0
Björn Lejon 80.25	2
Matthew Edgar 80.34	0
Jarno Bottenberg 88.27	2
Moreno Blom 77.88	0
Paul Lim 90.26	2
Dennis Nilsson 84.26	2
Howard Jones 72.77	0
Darren Johnson 78.72	1
Reece Colley 82.38	2
Aaron Turner 79.05	2
Jeff Springer 74.04	0
Sybren Gijbels 80.31	2
Kevin Luke 78.36	1
László Kádár 87.11	1
Hannes Schnier 90.91	2

Second round (best of 5 sets); 30 November - 4 December
1	Danny Porter 76.67	0
François Schweyen 79.86	3
16	Martyn Turner 84.30	1
Brian Raman 87.71	3
8	Benjamin Pratnemer 85.62	0
Carl Wilkinson 85.02	3
9	Thomas Junghans 85.40	3
James Beeton 82.62	2
4	Brandon Weening 82.34	3
Jun Matsuda 79.24	1
13	Edwin Torbjörnsson 87.93	0
Shane McGuirk 96.16	3
5	Peter Machin 88.08	3
Mike Gillet 81.20	0
12	Cliff Prior 74.34	3
Scott Walters 71.25	1
2	Jimmy van Schie 98.98	3
Björn Lejon 85.37	0
15	Ryan Hogarth 80.56	1
Jarno Bottenberg 89.11	3
7	Kai Fan Leung 87.44	2
Paul Lim 85.50	3
10	Gary Stone 87.00	3
Dennis Nilsson 86.90	2
3	Neil Duff 90.67	3
Reece Colley 90.10	2
14	Barry Copeland 83.98	3
Aaron Turner 73.77	0
6	Liam Maendl-Lawrance 73.84	2
Sybren Gijbels 80.81	3
11	Jason Brandon 88.85	3
Hannes Schnier 84.64	0

Third round (best of 5 sets); 4 - 5 December
François Schweyen 89.34	3
Brian Raman 88.55	2
Carl Wilkinson 80.99	2
9	Thomas Junghans 83.85	3
4	Brandon Weening 81.68	0
Shane McGuirk 93.62	3
5	Peter Machin 81.13	3
12	Cliff Prior 77.07	1
2	Jimmy van Schie 94.07	1
Jarno Bottenberg 92.31	3
Paul Lim 85.66	3
10	Gary Stone 83.67	2
3	Neil Duff 86.53	3
14	Barry Copeland 86.03	2
Sybren Gijbels 81.26	0
11	Jason Brandon 87.68	3

Quarter-finals (best of 7 sets); 6 December
François Schweyen 88.53	4
9	Thomas Junghans 85.69	0
Shane McGuirk 89.28	4
5	Peter Machin 86.94	0
Jarno Bottenberg 86.57	3
Paul Lim 85.47	4
3	Neil Duff 83.05	3
11	Jason Brandon 85.37	4

== Women's ==
=== Format and qualifiers ===
24 players will play for the women's title, with two time defending champion Beau Greaves defending her crown as the top seed. The top eight seeded players (decided by the WDF World Rankings) will enter in Round 2, with the other 16 entrants entering in Round 1. Noa-Lynn van Leuven and Fallon Sherrock both qualified for the WDF World Championships, but have opted to play in the PDC World Darts Championship instead.

1–8 in WDF Rankings
Seeded in second round

1. Beau Greaves (Winner)
2. Aileen de Graaf (Quarter-finals)
3. Rhian O'Sullivan (Second round)
4. Deta Hedman (Semi-finals)
5. Nicole Regnaud (Quarter-finals)
6. Aletta Wajer (Quarter-finals)
7. Irina Armstrong (Second round)
8. Desi Mercer (Second round)

Major Winner Wildcard
First round

1. Amanda Loch (First round)
2. Lisa Ashton (First round)

WDF Regional Table Qualifier
First round

1. Mayumi Ouchi (Second round)
2. Jitka Císařová (Quarter-finals)
3. Maud Jansson (First round)
4. Paula Murphy (Second round)

Qualifiers
First round

1. Sophie McKinlay (Runner-up)
2. Kirsi Viinikainen (Second round)

WDF Ranking non-qualified
First round

1. Lorraine Hyde (First round)
2. Wendy Harper (Second round)
3. Kirsty Hutchinson (Second round)
4. Anca Zijlstra (First round)
5. Lerena Rietbergen (Semi-finals)
6. Gréta Tekauer (First round)
7. Veronika Ihász (First round)
8. Paula Jacklin (First round)

=== Draw ===
First round (best of 3 sets); 30 November - 2 December
Amanda Loch 60.11	0
Kirsi Viinikainen 71.47	2
Anca Zijlstra 64.16	0
Jitka Císařová 77.74	2
Kirsty Hutchinson 62.89	2
Veronika Ihász 55.61	1
Wendy Harper 62.79	2
Gréta Tekauer 57.69	0
Lorraine Hyde 72.24	1
Mayumi Ouchi 69.70	2
Lisa Ashton 76.22	1
Sophie McKinlay 76.37	2
Lerena Rietbergen 59.37	2
Maud Jansson 51.86	0
Paula Murphy 62.28	2
Paula Jacklin 59.04	0

Second round (best of 3 sets); 1 - 5 December
1	Beau Greaves 82.89	2
Kirsi Viinikainen 78.97	0
8	Desi Mercer 61.28	0
Jitka Císařová 66.40	2
4	Deta Hedman 68.73	2
Kirsty Hutchinson 67.02	1
5	Nicole Regnaud 68.45	2
Wendy Harper 59.94	0
2	Aileen de Graaf 77.85	2
Mayumi Ouchi 67.56	0
7	Irina Armstrong 71.92	1
Sophie McKinlay 69.22	2
3	Rhian O'Sullivan 65.08	0
Lerena Rietbergen 77.84	2
6	Aletta Wajer 74.28	2
Paula Murphy 67.96	1

Quarter-finals (best of 3 sets); 6 December
1	Beau Greaves 79.89	2
Jitka Císařová 70.93	0
4	Deta Hedman 73.53	2
5	Nicole Regnaud 67.09	0
2	Aileen de Graaf 68.21	0
Sophie McKinlay 72.65	2
Lerena Rietbergen 66.01	2
6	Aletta Wajer 67.03	1

Semi-finals (best of 5 sets); 7 December
1	Beau Greaves 86.16	3
4	Deta Hedman 78.69	0
Sophie McKinlay 70.05	3
Lerena Rietbergen 69.10	1

Final (best of 7 sets); 8 December
1	Beau Greaves 83.92	4
Sophie McKinlay 73.81	1

== Boys' ==
=== Format and qualifiers ===
All boys under the age of 18 were eligible to play in the 2024 Lakeside WDF Boys World Championship tournament. The quarter-finals, semi-finals and final of the tournament were played at the Lakeside Country Club, Frimley Green. Four players through the Race Table, with a further four from the qualifying event in Budapest.

1–4 in WDF Rankings
Seeded

1. Jenson Walker (Runner-up)
2. Kendji Steinbach (Quarter-finals)
3. Ralfs Laumanis (Quarter-finals)
4. Balázs Szoták (Quarter-finals)

Qualifiers
Unseeded

1. Mason Teese (Quarter-finals)
2. Lex Paeshuyse (Semi-finals)
3. Florian Preis (Semi-finals)
4. Archie Self (Winner)

=== Draw ===
Quarter-finals (best of 3 sets); 5 - 6 December
1	Jenson Walker 92.56	2
Mason Teese 81.98	0
4	Balázs Szoták 62.86	0
Florian Preis 77.08	2
2	Kendji Steinbach 80.99	1
Archie Self 81.12	2
3	Ralfs Laumanis 81.65	0
Lex Paeshuyse 92.81	2

Semi-Finals (best of 3 sets); 7 December
1	Jenson Walker 82.86	2
Florian Preis 82.56	1
Archie Self 89.66	2
Lex Paeshuyse 83.73	0

Final (best of 5 sets); 8 December
1	Jenson Walker 84.76	2
Archie Self 81.34	3

== Girls' ==
=== Format and qualifiers ===
All girls under the age of 18 were eligible to play in the 2024 Lakeside WDF Girls World Championship tournament. The two seeds qualified through the race tables, while the two unseeded players qualified through the qualification event in Budapest.

1–2 in WDF Rankings
Seeded

1. Paige Pauling (Winner)
2. Sophie McKinlay (Runner-up)

Qualifiers
Unseeded

1. Aurora Fochesato (Semi-finals)
2. Jentl Fransen (Semi-finals)

=== Draw ===
Semi-finals (best of 3 sets); 7 December
1	Paige Pauling 65.79	2
Jentl Fransen 49.65	0
2	Sophie McKinlay 72.59	2
Aurora Fochesato 69.89	0

Final (best of 3 sets); 8 December
1	Paige Pauling 73.88	2
2	Sophie McKinlay 71.92	0

== Statistics ==
=== Top averages ===
This table shows the highest averages achieved by players throughout the tournament.

==== Men's ====
#	Player	Round	Average	Result	Score
1	Jimmy van Schie	R2	98.98	Won	3–0
2	Shane McGuirk	R2	96.16	Won	3-0
3	Jimmy van Schie (2)	R3	94.07	Lost	1–3
4	Shane McGuirk (2)	R3	93.62	Won	3–0
5	Shane McGuirk (3)	R1	92.81	Won	2–0
6	Shane McGuirk (4)	SF	92.72	Won	5–0
7	Jarno Bottenberg	R3	92.31	Won	3–1
8	Mike Gillet	R1	91.64	Won	2–0
9	Hannes Schnier	R1	90.91	Won	2–1
10	Neil Duff	R2	90.67	Won	3–2

==== Women's ====
#	Player	Round	Average	Result	Score
1	Beau Greaves	SF	86.16	Won	3–0
2	Beau Greaves (2)	F	83.92	Won	4–1
3	Beau Greaves (3)	R2	82.89	Won	2–0
4	Beau Greaves (4)	QF	79.89	Won	2–0
5	Kirsi Viinikainen	R2	78.97	Lost	0–2
6	Deta Hedman	SF	78.69	Lost	0–3
