= Frimley Lodge Park =

English park

Coordinates: 51.299°N 0.723°W

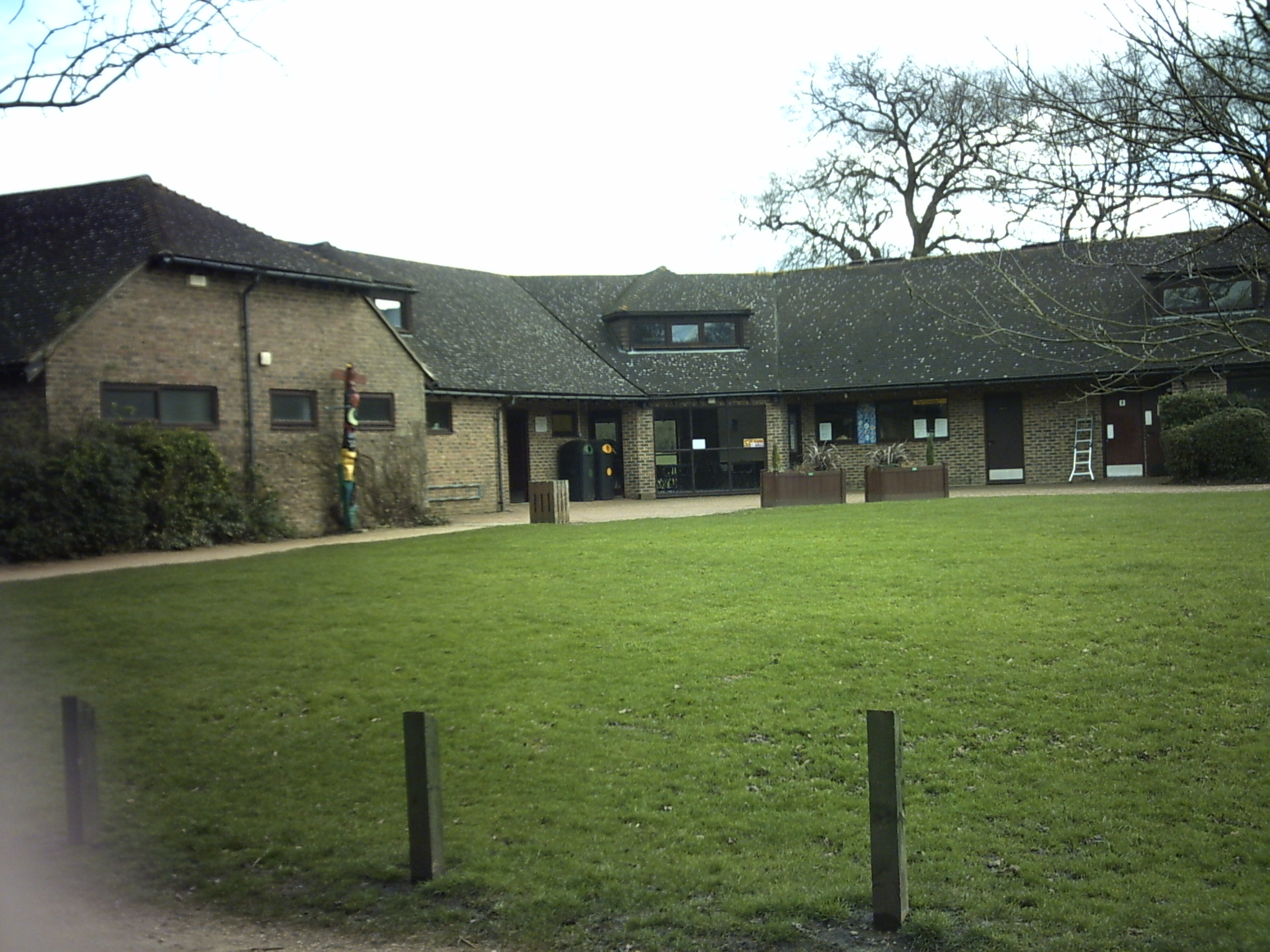
The Drake Pavilion, which incorporates a cafeteria and changing rooms for patrons of the sports grounds

Frimley Lodge Park is a 24 hectares (59 acres) recreational site located between Frimley Green and Mytchett in Surrey, England.

== Development ==
The park was developed from farmland between 1985 and 1988 at a cost of £1,500,000. The land had become the property of Surrey Heath Borough Council ten years after the owner passed away with no heirs in 1972.

== Amenities ==
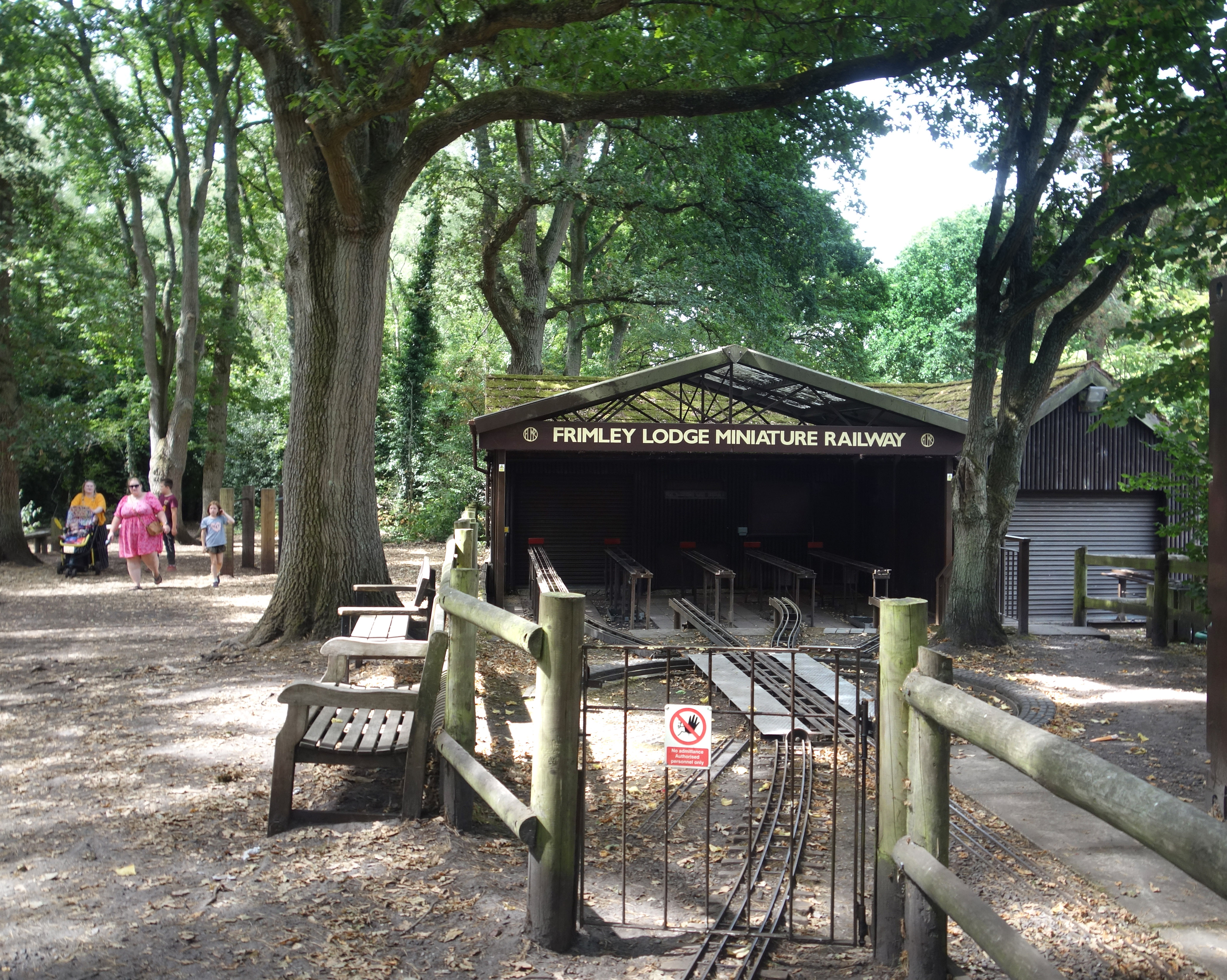
Frimley Lodge Miniature Railway

In addition to the park's open spaces, amenities at Frimley Lodge include picnic areas, a pitch and putt course, children's playground, and café. It offers grass football and cricket pitches as well as an all-weather 3G football pitch.

The park is home to Frimley Green Cricket Club, and First Frimley Green and Mytchett Scout Group.

Frimley Lodge Park Miniature Railway opened a one kilometre track in 1990 which runs in the northern wooded part of the park. It offers train rides on the first Sunday of each month between March and November.

Since February 2010 the park has been home to Frimley Lodge parkrun which takes place on Saturday mornings at 9:00am. It is run over two laps in the park and along the Basingstoke Canal towpath, and runners meet by the pavilion beforehand.

In January 2013, Surrey Heath Borough Council announced the unveiling of a memorial tree at the park after the idea of having a tree for people to visit to remember lost loved ones received support on Facebook.

== Awards ==
The park won a design award on completion and has subsequently won the Green Flag Award for 22 consecutive years.
