= Irish Open (darts) =

Tournament information
- Venue: Gleneagle Hotel
- Location: Killarney, Ireland
- Established: 2008
- Organisation(s): World Darts Federation (WDF)
- Format: Legs
- Prize fund: €22,550
- Month(s) Played: November

Current champion(s)
- David Davies (WAL) (open); Rhian O'Sullivan (WAL) (women's); Mitchell Lawrie (SCO) (youth); Paige Pauling (ENG) (girls)

The Irish Open is a WDF darts tournament held in Killarney, first established in 2008. It is jointly held with the Irish Classic during the same weekend.

== Irish Open ==
=== Men's ===
Year	Champion	Av.	Score	Runner-Up	Av.	Prize Money			Venue
Year	Champion	Av.	Score	Runner-Up	Av.	Total	Ch.	R.-Up	Venue
2008	(Republic of Ireland) Martin McCloskey	n/a	6 – 5	(Republic of Ireland) Damien O'Driscoll	n/a	€2,800	€1,000	€500	Citywest, Dublin
2019	Michael Warburton	90.43	7 – 6	Keane Barry	85.09	€12,100	€3,000	€1,500	Gleneagle Hotel, Killarney
2021	Luke Littler	n/a	6 – 2	Barry Copeland	n/a	€12,800	€3,200	€1,600	Gleneagle Hotel, Killarney
2022	Jelle Klaasen	93.51	6 – 3	Dylan Slevin	93.96	€16,080	€4,000	€2,000	Gleneagle Hotel, Killarney
2023	Shane McGuirk	82.17	6 – 2	Ryan Hogarth	74.92	€12,800	€3,200	€1,600	Gleneagle Hotel, Killarney
2024	Marko Kantele	85.18	6 – 5	James Beeton	82.16	€12,800	€3,200	€1,600	Gleneagle Hotel, Killarney
2025	David Davies	90.96	6 – 4	Ross Montgomery	82.28	€14,640	€3,600	€1,800	Gleneagle Hotel, Killarney

=== Women's ===
Year	Champion	Av.	Score	Runner-Up	Av.	Prize Money			Venue
Year	Champion	Av.	Score	Runner-Up	Av.	Total	Ch.	R.-Up	Venue
2008	(Republic of Ireland) Angela De Ward	n/a	beat	Denise Cassidy	n/a	€1,200	€500	€250	Citywest, Dublin
2019	Fallon Sherrock	85.84	6 – 1	Kirsty Hutchinson	70.28	€6,400	€1,500	€1,000	Gleneagle Hotel, Killarney
2021	Anastasia Dobromyslova	n/a	5 – 4	Deta Hedman	n/a	€5,600	€1,600	€800	Gleneagle Hotel, Killarney
2022	Beau Greaves	82.05	5 – 1	Rhian O'Sullivan	71.02	€7,040	€2,000	€1,000	Gleneagle Hotel, Killarney
2023	Aileen de Graaf	78.59	5 – 3	Rhian O'Sullivan	81.37	€5,600	€1,600	€800	Gleneagle Hotel, Killarney
2024	Lorraine Hyde	76.11	5 – 3	Lerena Rietbergen	65.84	€5,600	€1,600	€800	Gleneagle Hotel, Killarney
2025	Rhian O'Sullivan	78.67	5 – 3	Deta Hedman	78.33	€6,420	€1,800	€900	Gleneagle Hotel, Killarney

=== Boys ===
Year	Champion	Av.	Score	Runner-Up	Av.	Prize Money			Venue
Year	Champion	Av.	Score	Runner-Up	Av.	Total	Ch.	R.-Up	Venue
2019	Dylan Slevin	78.43	4 – 3	(Republic of Ireland) Mark Griffin	65.98	€600	€200	€140	Gleneagle Hotel, Killarney
2021	Adam Dee	91.75	5 – 2	Luke Littler	95.31	€600	€200	€120	Gleneagle Hotel, Killarney
2022	Luke Littler	82.83	4 – 1	Sean McKeon	75.14	€600	€200	€120	Gleneagle Hotel, Killarney
2023	(Republic of Ireland) Aidan O'Hara	67.36	4 – 2	(Republic of Ireland) Jack Courtney	64.19	€450	€150	€100	Gleneagle Hotel, Killarney
2024	(Scotland) Mitchell Lawrie	85.89	4 – 0	(Republic of Ireland) James Morris	78.77	€500	€200	€100	Gleneagle Hotel, Killarney
2025	(Scotland) Mitchell Lawrie (2)	103.53	4 – 2	(England) Kaya Baysal	82.55	€1,060	€300	€200	Gleneagle Hotel, Killarney

=== Girls ===
Year	Champion	Av.	Score	Runner-Up	Av.	Prize Money			Venue
Year	Champion	Av.	Score	Runner-Up	Av.	Total	Ch.	R.-Up	Venue
2022	Rebecca Allen	56.19	4 – 0	(Republic of Ireland) Rachel Ivers	38.53	€600	€200	€120	Gleneagle Hotel, Killarney
2023	Paige Pauling	75.11	4 – 3	Sophie McKinlay	71.91	€150	€70	€40	Gleneagle Hotel, Killarney
2024	Paige Pauling (2)	57.27	4 – 1	(Republic of Ireland) Zoe Burke	47.50	€200	€100	€50	Gleneagle Hotel, Killarney
2025	Paige Pauling (3)	71.76	4 – 1	(Republic of Ireland) Rebecca Allen	66.58	€400	€200	€100	Gleneagle Hotel, Killarney
