= JDC World Darts Championship =

JDC World Championship

Tournament information
- Venue: Alexandra Palace
- Location: London
- Country: England
- Established: 2017
- Organisation(s): JDC
- Format: Legs
- Prize fund: €8,000

Current champion(s)
- Mitchell Lawrie

The JDC World Darts Championship is a darts tournament that acts as the World Championship for players who are under 18. It is administered by the Junior Darts Corporation, an affiliate tour associated with the Professional Darts Corporation. It has been held since 2017 in various locations, while the final match is played during the PDC World Darts Championship in Alexandra Palace, London. Competitors participating in the JDC World Darts Championship must be older than 10 years of age and younger than 18 years of age throughout the tournament. In 2017, Rusty-Jake Rodriguez became the inaugural JDC World Champion. Among the former champions is Luke Littler, the back-to-back PDC World Champion. The reigning champion is Mitchell Lawrie.

== Final results and statistics ==
Year	Champion	Av.	Score	Runner-up	Av.
2017	Rusty-Jake Rodriguez	n/a	5 – 4	Owen Roelofs	n/a
2018	Jurjen van der Velde	n/a	4 – 2	Lennon Cradock	n/a
2019	Keane Barry	93.10	5 – 3	Adam Gawlas	84.00
2021	Bradly Roes	79.85	5 – 4	Leighton Bennett	81.48
2022	Luke Littler	88.41	5 – 0	Harry Gregory	73.61
2023	Luke Littler (2)	102.62	5 – 3	Álmos Kovács	86.28
2024	Lex Paeshuyse	90.85	5 – 1	Daniel Stephenson	82.55
2025	Mitchell Lawrie	84.50	5 – 2	Kaya Baysal	86.76
