= Cliff Inglis =

English darts player (1935–2001)

Personal information
- Nickname: "Ticker"
- Born: 1935 Plymouth, England
- Died: 5 January 2001 (aged 66)

Sport
- Sport: Darts
- Playing since: 1955
- Darts: 14g
- Laterality: Right-handed

Organisation (see split in darts)
- BDO: 1974–1976, 1981

WDF major events – best performances
- World Masters: Winner (1): 1974
- Updated on 25 January 2019

Cliff Inglis (1935 – 5 January 2001) was an English professional darts player. His prime years were in the mid-1970s and 1980s. Inglis was the winner of the first World Masters tournament, still considered by many as the most prestigious darts competition. He was nicknamed Ticker during his career. Ticker famously lost to Ian “Sparky” Vincent to a 123 checkout at the Dennis Davis Trophy at the Radnor Arms in Plymouth in 1988.

== Career ==
In 1974, Inglis won the inaugural Phonogram World Masters, defeating Harry Heenan 3–2 in the final. The following year he was a Unicorn World Darts Championship finalist, and was runner-up in the Indoor League – which was televised by Yorkshire TV - to Conrad Daniels. For two successive years in the mid-1970s, he won the Man of the Match award playing for England in the Home Internationals.

On 11 November 1975, at the Broomfield Working Men's Club in Devon, England, Inglis entered the Guinness Book of Records by throwing a 19-dart 1001 game. Inglis averaged 52.68 points per dart.

Inglis quit the BDO in 1981 and retired shortly thereafter.

== Career finals ==
=== BDO major finals: 1 (1 title) ===
Outcome	No.	Year	Championship	Opponent in the final	Score (Note: (l) = score in legs, (s) = score in sets.)
Winner	1.	1974	World Masters	(Scotland) Harry Heenan	3-2 (s)

== Performance timeline ==
Tournament	1974	1975
World Masters	W	L32
