= Frimley Lodge Park Railway =

English railway

Frimley Lodge Miniature Railway

Frimley Lodge Park
- Coordinates: 51°17′53.07″N 0°43′32.36″W
- Status: Operating
- Cost: Single tickets - £1.50, Family tickets (10 rides) - £12, Under 3s - Free.
- Opening date: 1990

Ride statistics
- Attraction type: Miniature railway
- Vehicle type: Steam, Diesel
- Duration: 5 minutes

The Frimley Lodge Miniature Railway is operated by the Frimley and Ascot Locomotive Club and is located within Frimley Lodge Park, Surrey. The railway consists of two tracks, a ground level and an elevated track.

== Tracks ==
The ground level track opened in 1990 and is approximately 1 kilometre (0.62 mi) long in total, with a triple gauge track (3 1/2 in (89 mm), 5 in (127 mm) and 7 1/4 in (184 mm)) looping around an area of trees next to the Basingstoke Canal. The journey takes about 5 minutes and is an attraction to young and old alike.

The elevated track opened in 2012 and is an approximately 200 metres (660 ft) long loop and is a triple gauge track (2 1/2 in (64 mm), 3 1/2 in (89 mm) and 5 in (127 mm)).
