= Frimley Green =

Village in Surrey, England

Coordinates: 51.30164°N 0.73049°W

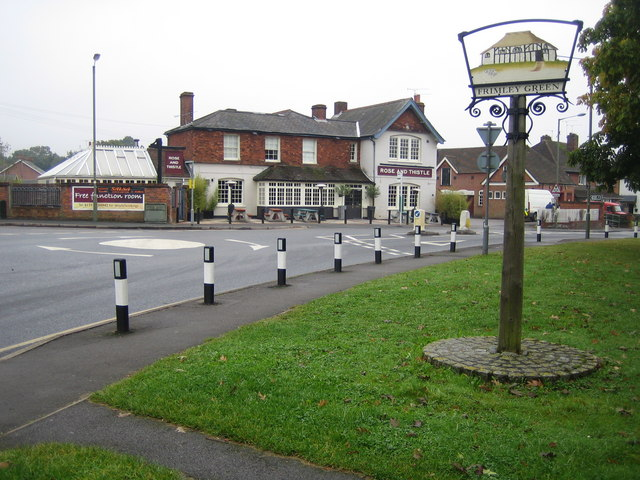

- Location within Surrey
- Population: 18,900; 5,717 (Surrey Heath Ward)
- OS grid reference: SU8957
- District: Surrey Heath
- Shire county: Surrey
- Region: South East
- Country: England
- Sovereign state: United Kingdom
- Post town: CAMBERLEY
- Postcode district: GU16
- Dialling code: 01252
- Police: Surrey
- Fire: Surrey
- Ambulance: South East Coast

Frimley Green is a large village and ward of 580 acres (2.3 km^{2}) in the borough of Surrey Heath, in Surrey, England. It lies 1 mi (1.6 km) south of the town of Frimley and 30 mi (48 km) south-west of central London. Lakeside Country Club was the national venue for the BDO international darts competition. It was played annually in the village between 1986 and 2019.

== History ==
=== Toponymy ===
Frimley Green, as with many British villages bearing the word green, is named after a central village green.

=== As part of Frimley ===
Frimley was a chapelry of Ash which local nobles had established as a manor from 1277. Henry Elliot Malden in the Victoria County History (1911–12) believes Frimley manor may have been the land in Ash purchased by Bartholomew de Winton, Abbot of Chertsey Abbey in 1277, from a Sir Walter Raleigh (not his more famous explorer namesake). Henry VIII granted it to Sir John White of Aldershot. James Tichborne sold the remaining land, chiefly the manor house to Mr. Tekel(l) and by 1911 the land had virtually all been subdivided.

=== Separation of identity and growth ===
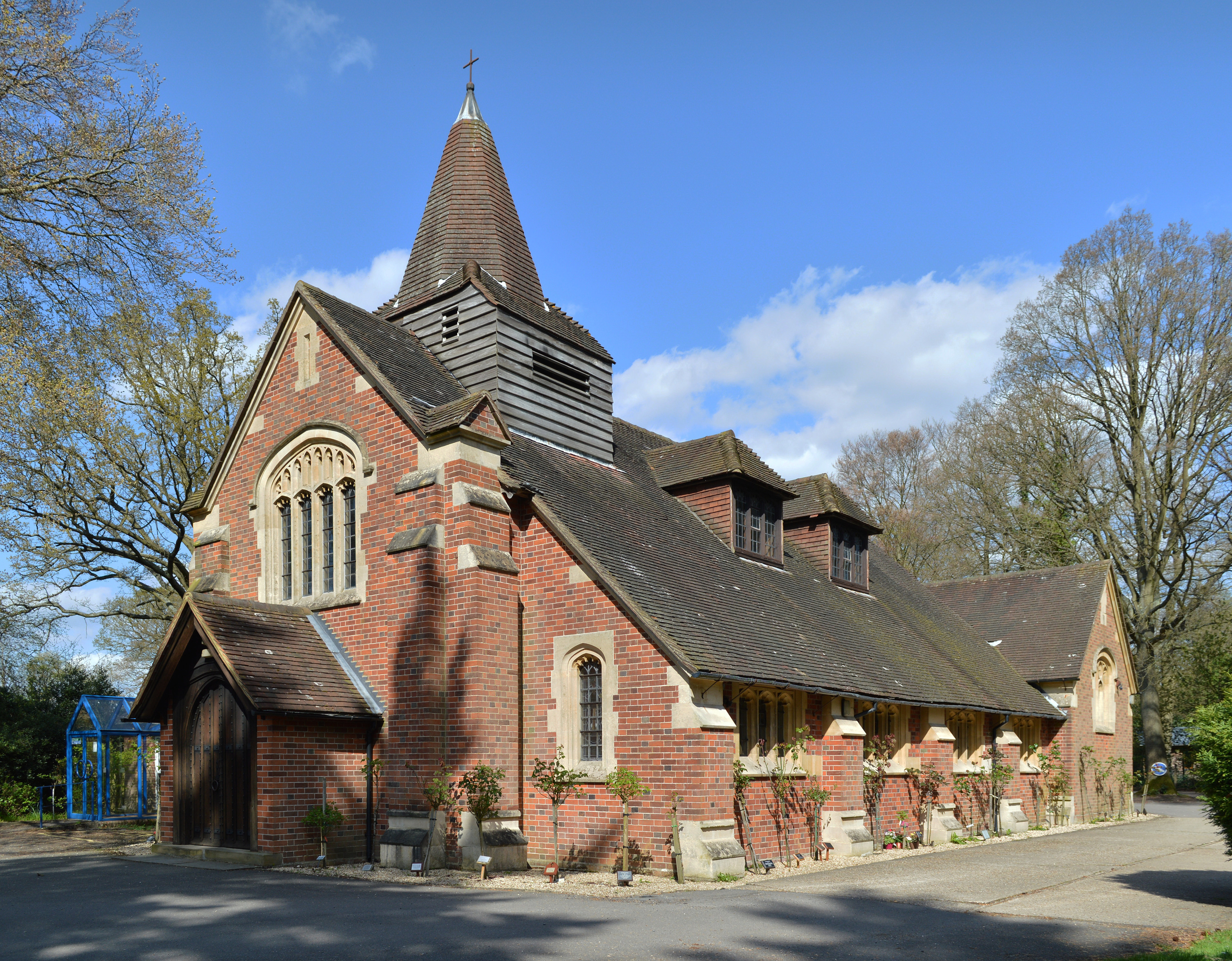
St Andrew's Church was built in 1911 and is a Grade II listed building.

Frimley Green gained, from its mother area, Frimley, half of a formal identity in 1889, when its first church was built, replaced in 1912. This remains joined with Mytchett in providing a choice of services, offered by the Church of England.

Catering to an expanded late 20th century population across the west of the district, in 1969 a Roman Catholic church was built just across the border in Frimley to the north and Frimley Park Hospital was built in 1974.

== Demography ==
The area of the ward is 580 acres (2.3 km^{2}). At the 2011 census, its population had risen from 5,639 in 2001 to 5,717. There were 2,266 households, with 47.1% owned by people with a mortgage and 35.2% outright. Greater than the national and local averages, 55.2% of the population described their health as "very good".

The ward was created on the establishment of a council in 1965.

Population of Frimley Green
Year	2001	2011
Population	5,639	5,717

== Geography ==
The land slopes down from Deepcut, partly on the Chobham Ridges to the east, to the River Blackwater which is preceded by the lakes and small woods in the south-west of the ward which form the boundary with Hampshire.

Most of the woods and lakes are sectioned off by the Ascot to Guildford Line, the only railway within its bounds.

== Amenities ==
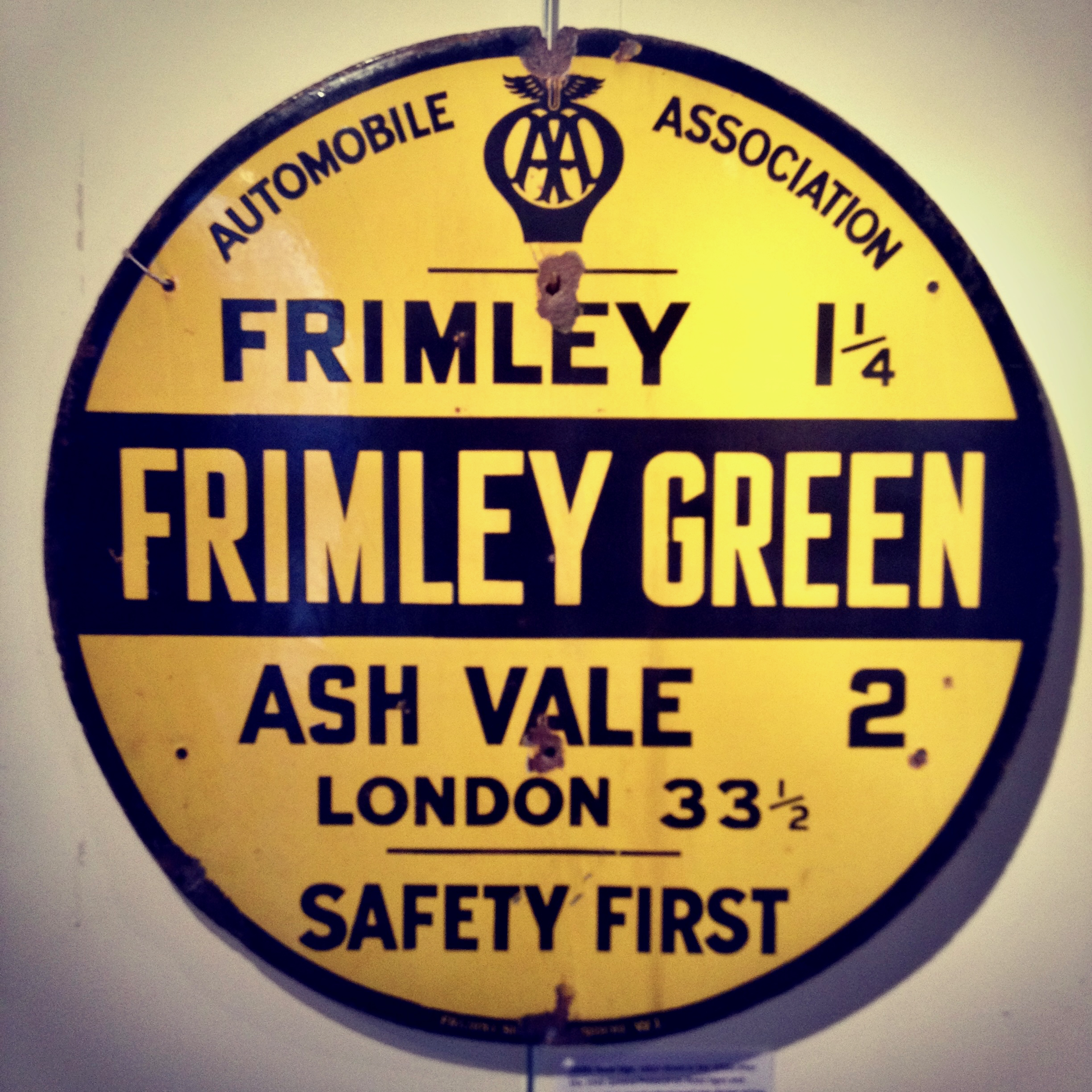
Automobile Association road sign on display in Surrey Heath Museum, Camberley

The Basingstoke Canal runs alongside the park in the south and has a traditional wharf and inn here. Frimley Green's main green spaces comprise large playing fields, a wooded area with an activity trail and a miniature railway.

Frimley Lodge Park consisting of wide-ranging recreational areas is between the developed south-centre of Frimley Green and Mytchett.

Main schools are Frimley Church of England School and Cross Farm Infant School.

== Transport ==
The area is served by three railway stations, with all routes operated by South Western Railway:

- Frimley for services between Aldershot, Camberley and Ascot
- Farnborough North on the North Downs Line between Gatwick Airport and Reading
- Farnborough (Main) on the South West Main Line between Southampton Central and London Waterloo.

Stagecoach South and White Bus Services operate local bus routes, which connect the village with Aldershot, Camberley, Farnborough, Woking and Yateley.

The main road connecting the area inter-regionally is the M3 motorway, centred 2 miles (3.2 km) to the north, which has a junction near to its closest point.

== Sport and leisure ==
Lakeside Country Club is to the south of the village, and hosted the British Darts Organisation’s (BDO) World Professional Darts Championship each January from 1986 to 2019 before the event moved to The Indigo at the O2 Arena, London.

Frimley Green F.C. play in the Premier Division of the Combined Counties Football League.

== Notable residents ==
- Dame Ethel Smyth, composer
- Christopher Howarth, figure skater
